= The Layla Sessions: 20th Anniversary Edition =

Box set by Derek and the Dominos
- Released: September 1990
- Recorded: 26 August–2 October 1970
- Genres: Blues rock, jam rock
- Length: 218:36
- Label: Polydor
- Producers: Tom Dowd (executive producer); Bill Levenson (reissue producer)

Derek and the Dominos chronology
In Concert (1973)	The Layla Sessions: 20th Anniversary Edition (1990)	Live at the Fillmore (1994)

Eric Clapton chronology
Journeyman (1989)	The Layla Sessions: 20th Anniversary Edition (1990)	24 Nights (1991)

The Layla Sessions: 20th Anniversary Edition (or The Layla Sessions) released September 1990 is an anniversary remix of the 1970 Layla and Other Assorted Love Songs album by Derek and the Dominos. The album contains the original album, remixed to improve audio quality, and, in the 3-CD edition, two extra discs of unused alternate and incomplete masters of the original songs and studio jamming. The box set was designed by Mitchell Kanner.

== Critical reception ==
Professional ratings
Review scores
Source	Rating
AllMusic	3/5 stars
MusicHound Rock	4/5
Rolling Stone	3/5 stars
The Rolling Stone Album Guide	4/5 stars
The Village Voice	B−

Reviewing in October 1990, Ira Robbins of Rolling Stone said the original album has "aged gracefully", but found the rest inferior, including some of the "intriguing" outtakes. Robert Christgau was more critical in The Village Voice, questioning the value and purpose of the box set. While most fulfill marketing rather than musical purposes, The Layla Sessions is especially suspicious, in his opinion:

It pretends that Eric Clapton's finest pickup band … deserves the kind of genius treatment that's dubious even with great jazz improvisors. And since it unearths not much Duane Allman (no surprise, since he barely met the band), it cheats on the dueling-guitars fireworks that made Layla explode. This is pop, gang – arrangements matter. Outtakes are outtakes because the keepers are better. Jams take too long to get anywhere worth going. And when a mix trades raunch for definition, the exchange is usually moot.

== Track listing ==
=== Disc one: Layla and Other Assorted Love Songs (remixed version) ===
1. "I Looked Away" (Eric Clapton, Bobby Whitlock) Recorded September 2, 1970. Overdubbed September 2 & 4, 1970
2. "Bell Bottom Blues" (Clapton, Whitlock) Recorded September 2, 1970. Overdubbed September 4 & 9, 1970
3. "Keep on Growing" (Clapton, Whitlock) Recorded September 1, 1970. Overdubbed September 1,2,5 & 9, 1970
4. "Nobody Knows You When You're Down and Out" (Jimmy Cox) Recorded August 31, 1970.
5. "I Am Yours" (Clapton, Nizami) Recorded September 3, 1970. Overdubbed September 4 & 9, 1970
6. "Anyday" (Clapton, Whitlock) Recorded September 3, 1970. Overdubbed September 4, 1970
7. "Key to the Highway" (Charles Segar, Willie Broonzy) Recorded August 30, 1970.
8. "Tell the Truth" (Clapton, Whitlock) Recorded August 28, 1970. Overdubbed September 1 & 4, 1970
9. "Why Does Love Got to Be So Sad?" (Clapton, Whitlock) Recorded August 31, 1970. Overdubbed September 1 & 9, 1970
10. "Have You Ever Loved a Woman" (Billy Myles) Recorded September 2, 1970.
11. "Little Wing" (Jimi Hendrix) Recorded September 9, 1970.
12. "It's Too Late" (Chuck Willis) Recorded September 3, 1970. Overdubbed September 9 & October 1, 1970
13. "Layla" (Clapton, Jim Gordon) Recorded September 9, 1970. Overdubbed October 1, 1970
14. "Thorn Tree in the Garden" (Whitlock) Recorded September 10, 1970.

=== Disc two: The Jams ===
1. "Jam I" (Clapton, Gordon, Carl Radle, Whitlock) Recorded September 2, 1970
2. "Jam II" (Clapton, Gordon, Radle, Whitlock) Recorded August 26, 1970
3. "Jam III" (Clapton, Gordon, Radle, Whitlock) Recorded August 27, 1970
4. "Jam IV" (Duane Allman, Gregg Allman, Dickey Betts, Berry Oakley, Butch Trucks, Clapton, Whitlock) Recorded August 27, 1970
5. "Jam V" (Duane Allman, Clapton, Gordon, Radle, Whitlock) Recorded August 27, 1970

=== Disc three: Alternate Masters, Jams and Outtakes ===
1. "Have You Ever Loved a Woman (Alternate Master #1)" (Myles) Recorded August 31, 1970
2. "Have You Ever Loved a Woman (Alternate Master #2)" (Myles) Recorded August 26, 1970
3. "Tell the Truth (Jam #1)" (Clapton, Whitlock) Recorded August 27, 1970
4. "Tell the Truth (Jam #2)" (Clapton, Whitlock) Recorded August 27, 1970
5. "Mean Old World (Rehearsal)" (Little Walter) Recorded October 2, 1970
6. "Mean Old World (Band Version, Master Take)" (Little Walter) Recorded October 2, 1970
7. "Mean Old World (Duet Version, Master Take)" (Little Walter) Recorded October 2, 1970
8. "(When Things Go Wrong) It Hurts Me Too (Jam)" (Trad., arr. Mel London) Recorded August 27, 1970
9. "Tender Love (Incomplete Master)" (Clapton, Whitlock) Recorded August 27, 1970
10. "It's Too Late (Alternate Master)" (Willis) Recorded September 9, 1970
