= Live at the Fillmore (Derek and the Dominos album) =

Live album by Derek and the Dominos
- Released: February 22, 1994
- Recorded: 23 & 24 October 1970
- Venue: Fillmore East (Manhattan, New York City)
- Genre: Blues rock, jam rock
- Length: 122:21
- Label: Polydor
- Producer: Bill Levenson

Derek and the Dominos chronology
The Layla Sessions: 20th Anniversary Edition (1990)	Live at the Fillmore (1994)

Eric Clapton chronology
Unplugged (1992)	Live at the Fillmore (1994)	From the Cradle (1994)

Professional ratings
Review scores
Source	Rating
Allmusic	3/5 stars

Live at the Fillmore is a live double album by Derek and the Dominos, recorded in two performances in October 1970 at the Fillmore East and released on 22 February 1994. It includes live material previously released on the In Concert album, live material previously released on Eric Clapton's Crossroads box set, and several previously unreleased numbers.

The setlist contains eight Derek and the Dominos songs (six from the album Layla and Other Assorted Love Songs, plus "Roll It Over" and "Got to Get Better in a Little While"), three tunes from Clapton's first solo album (on which the other three band members had played), and one song from two bands to which Clapton had previously belonged ("Presence of the Lord" from Blind Faith; and a different arrangement of Robert Johnson's "Crossroads" that Clapton had previously covered with Cream).

== Track listing ==
Disc one
No.	Title	Writer(s)	Length
1.	"Got to Get Better in a Little While"	Eric Clapton	13:52
2.	"Why Does Love Got to Be So Sad?"	Clapton, Bobby Whitlock	14:49
3.	"Key to the Highway"	Big Bill Broonzy, Charles Segar	6:25
4.	"Blues Power"	Clapton, Leon Russell	10:31
5.	"Have You Ever Loved a Woman"	Billy Myles	8:16
6.	"Bottle of Red Wine"	Clapton, Bonnie Bramlett	5:34

Disc two
No.	Title	Writer(s)	Length
1.	"Tell the Truth"	Clapton, Whitlock	11:04
2.	"Nobody Knows You When You're Down and Out"	Jimmy Cox	5:33
3.	"Roll It Over"	Clapton, Whitlock	6:40
4.	"Presence of the Lord"	Clapton	6:16
5.	"Little Wing"	Jimi Hendrix	6:13
6.	"Let It Rain"	Clapton, Bramlett	18:19
7.	"Crossroads"	Robert Johnson, arranged by Clapton	8:29

October 23, 1970 (second show): 1-1, 1-2, 1-6, 2-1, 2-5, 2-6, 2-7
October 24, 1970 (second show): 1-3, 1-4, 1-5, 2-2, 2-3, 2-4

== Personnel ==
Credits adapted from album's liner notes.

Derek and the Dominos

- Eric Clapton – guitar, vocals
- Bobby Whitlock – keyboards, vocals
- Carl Radle – bass guitar
- Jim Gordon – drums

Production

- Bill Levenson – producer
- Eddie Kramer – engineer
- Anthony DeCurtis – liner notes
- Jay Mark – digital remix engineer
- Joseph M. Palmaccio – digital mastering
