= In Concert (Derek and the Dominos album) =

Live album by Derek and the Dominos
- Released: January 1973
- Recorded: 23 & 24 October 1970
- Venue: Fillmore East (New York City)
- Genres: Blues rock, jam rock
- Length: 89:45
- Label: Polydor Records

Derek and the Dominos chronology
Layla and Other Assorted Love Songs (1970)	In Concert (1973)	The Layla Sessions: 20th Anniversary Edition (1990)

Eric Clapton chronology
The History of Eric Clapton (1972)	In Concert (1973)	Eric Clapton's Rainbow Concert (1973)

In Concert is a live double album by Derek and the Dominos, recorded in October 1970 at the Fillmore East during the group's 1970 US tour and released in January 1973.

== Background ==
In Concert was recorded on October 23 and 24, 1970 at the Fillmore East during Derek and the Domino's 1970 US tour. Duane Allman, who played guitar during the Layla and Other Assorted Love Songs recording sessions along with Eric Clapton, does not feature on In Concert, as he had returned to his old band. However, he did make two appearances with Derek and the Dominos on December 1, 1970 at the Curtis Hixon Hall in Tampa and December 2, 1970 at Onondaga County War Memorial in Syracuse, New York, although none of those performances are featured on In Concert.

Six of the album's nine tracks were later included on the 1994 album Live at the Fillmore. The three songs not included are "Why Does Love Got to Be So Sad?," "Let It Rain," and "Tell the Truth." Live at the Fillmore also includes these songs, although they are from different sets than the ones appearing here.

== Release and reception ==
In Concert reached No. 20 on the Billboard Top LPs chart on January 27, 1973 and reached No. 36 on the UK Albums Chart on March 24.

Cash Box reviewed the live single release of "Why Does Love Got to Be So Sad?" saying it contains "some fine guitar work and plenty of commercial appeal."

Professional ratings
Review scores
Source	Rating
AllMusic	3.5/5 stars
Christgau's Record Guide	A−
The Rolling Stone Album Guide	3.5/5 stars

== Reissue ==
In 2011, the 40th anniversary Super Deluxe Edition of Layla and Other Assorted Love Songs included a remastered version of In Concert. The remastered double-disc album was also expanded to include bonus tracks "Key to the Highway", "Nobody Knows You When You're Down and Out", "Little Wing" and "Crossroads", with alternate takes of "Why Does Love Got to Be So Sad?" "Let It Rain" and "Tell the Truth", all from Live at the Fillmore.

== Track listing ==
Side one
No.	Title	Writer(s)	Length
1.	"Why Does Love Got to Be So Sad?"	Eric Clapton, Bobby Whitlock	9:40
2.	"Got to Get Better in a Little While"	Clapton	13:50

Side two
No.	Title	Writer(s)	Length
3.	"Let It Rain"	Bonnie Bramlett, Clapton	17:14
4.	"Presence of the Lord"	Clapton	6:33

Side three
No.	Title	Writer(s)	Length
5.	"Tell the Truth"	Clapton, Whitlock	11:10
6.	"Bottle of Red Wine"	Bramlett, Clapton	6:50

Side four
No.	Title	Writer(s)	Length
7.	"Roll It Over"	Clapton, Whitlock	6:25
8.	"Blues Power/Have You Ever Loved a Woman"	Clapton, Leon Russell, Billy Myles	17:30

== Personnel ==
Credits adapted from album's liner notes.

Derek and the Dominos

- Eric Clapton – guitar, vocals
- Bobby Whitlock – keyboards, vocals
- Carl Radle – bass guitar
- Jim Gordon – drums

Production

- Eddie Kramer – engineer
- Andy Knight – remix engineer
- Richard Manwaring – remix engineer

Artwork

- Mike Caple – artwork
- Fin Costello – front cover photos
- Julian Lloyd – inner sleeve and back cover photos

== Certifications ==
Region	Certification	Certified units/sales
United States (RIAA)	Gold	500,000^{^}
^{^} Shipments figures based on certification alone.
