= Eric Clapton's Rainbow Concert =

Live album by Eric Clapton
- Released: 10 September 1973
- Recorded: 13 January 1973
- Venue: Rainbow Theatre, London
- Genre: Blues rock
- Length: 34:48; 73:49 (remastered edition)
- Label: RSO
- Producer: Bob Pridden

Eric Clapton chronology
In Concert (1973)	Eric Clapton's Rainbow Concert (1973)	461 Ocean Boulevard (1974)

Alternative cover
- 1995 remastered edition

Eric Clapton's Rainbow Concert is a live album by Eric Clapton, recorded at the Rainbow Theatre in London on 13 January 1973 and released in September that year. The concerts, two on the same evening, were organised by Pete Townshend of the Who and marked a comeback by Clapton after two years of inactivity, broken only by his performance at the Concert for Bangladesh in August 1971. Along with Townshend, the musicians supporting Clapton include Steve Winwood, Ronnie Wood and Jim Capaldi. In the year following the two shows at the Rainbow, Clapton recovered from his heroin addiction and recorded 461 Ocean Boulevard (1974).

A remastered expanded edition of the album was released on 13 January 1995, the 22nd anniversary of the concert.

== Background ==
The concert was held at the Rainbow Theatre in Finsbury Park, north London, on 13 January 1973. The venue was popular during the 1960s and early 1970s; musicians such as The Beatles, The Who, Genesis, Deep Purple, Pink Floyd, Jethro Tull and Queen performed there. The concert was recorded using Ronnie Lane's Mobile Studio.

== Reception ==
Professional ratings
Review scores
Source	Rating
AllMusic	3/5 stars
Christgau's Record Guide	C−

In a retrospective review, AllMusic deemed the album "an adequate live document, though one can find better performances of the songs on other records." The review also noted that the performance was an ensemble effort, and was as much a showcase for Steve Winwood as it was for Clapton.

== Track listing ==
Side one
No.	Title	Writer(s)	Length
1.	"Badge"	Eric Clapton, George Harrison	3:29
2.	"Roll It Over"	Clapton, Bobby Whitlock	6:53
3.	"Presence Of The Lord"	Clapton	5:37

Side two
No.	Title	Writer(s)	Length
4.	"Pearly Queen"	Jim Capaldi, Steve Winwood	6:58
5.	"After Midnight"	J. J. Cale	5:11
6.	"Little Wing"	Jimi Hendrix	6:32

1995 CD remastered reissue
No.	Title	Writer(s)	Length
1.	"Layla"	Clapton, Jim Gordon	6:24
2.	"Badge"	Clapton, Harrison	3:18
3.	"Blues Power"	Clapton, Leon Russell	5:20
4.	"Roll It Over"	Clapton, Whitlock	4:11
5.	"Little Wing"	Hendrix	4:36
6.	"Bottle Of Red Wine"	Bonnie Bramlett, Clapton	3:51
7.	"After Midnight"	Cale	4:25
8.	"Bell Bottom Blues"	Clapton, Whitlock	5:26
9.	"Presence Of The Lord"	Clapton	5:18
10.	"Tell The Truth"	Clapton, Whitlock	5:52
11.	"Pearly Queen"	Capaldi, Winwood	4:55
12.	"Key To The Highway"	Big Bill Broonzy, Charlie Segar	5:46
13.	"Let It Rain"	Bramlett, Clapton	7:11
14.	"Crossroads"	Robert Johnson	4:18

== Personnel ==
- Eric Clapton – guitar (lead) & vocals
- Pete Townshend – guitar (rhythm) & vocals
- Ron Wood – guitar (rhythm and slide) & vocals
- Ric Grech – bass guitar
- Steve Winwood – keyboards & vocals
- Jim Capaldi – drums & vocals
- Jimmy Karstein – drums
- Rebop Kwaku Baah – percussion
- John Kosh - album cover designer
