= Layla and Other Assorted Love Songs =

Studio album by Derek and the Dominos
- Released: 9 November 1970
- Recorded: 28 August – 1 October 1970
- Studio: Criteria (Miami)
- Genre: Blues rock
- Length: 76:44
- Labels: Polydor, Atco
- Producers: Tom Dowd; Derek and the Dominos

Derek and the Dominos chronology
Layla and Other Assorted Love Songs (1970)	In Concert (1973)

Eric Clapton chronology
Eric Clapton (1970)	Layla and Other Assorted Love Songs (1970)	The History of Eric Clapton (1972)

Singles from Layla and Other Assorted Love Songs
- 1. "Bell Bottom Blues" Released: 29 January 1971; 2. "Layla" Released: 12 March 1971

Layla and Other Assorted Love Songs is the only studio album by the English–American rock band Derek and the Dominos, released on 9 November 1970 as a double album by Polydor Records and Atco Records. It is best known for its title track, "Layla", which is often regarded as Eric Clapton's greatest musical achievement. The other band members were Bobby Whitlock (vocals, keyboard), Jim Gordon (drums, percussion), and Carl Radle (bass). Duane Allman played lead and slide guitar on 11 of the 14 songs.

Initially regarded as a critical and commercial disappointment, it failed to chart in Britain and peaked at number 16 on the Billboard Top LPs chart in the United States. It returned to the US albums chart again in 1972, 1974 and 1977, and has since been certified Gold by the RIAA. The album finally debuted on the UK Albums Chart in 2011, peaking at number 68. In 2000, the album was inducted into the Grammy Hall of Fame. In 2003, television network VH1 named Layla and Other Assorted Love Songs the 89th-greatest album of all time. In the same year, Rolling Stone ranked it number 117 on its list of "The 500 Greatest Albums of All Time". It was ranked at number 226 on the 2020 reboot of the list. It was voted number 287 in the third edition of Colin Larkin's All Time Top 1000 Albums (2000). In 2012, the Super Deluxe Edition of Layla won a Grammy Award for Best Surround Sound Album.

== Background ==
Derek and the Dominos grew out of Eric Clapton's frustration with the hype associated with his previous bands, the supergroups Cream and Blind Faith. Following the latter's dissolution, he joined Delaney & Bonnie and Friends, whom he had come to know while they were the opening act on Blind Faith's US tour in the summer of 1969. After that band also split up, a Friends alumnus, Bobby Whitlock, joined up with Clapton in Surrey, England. From April 1970, the two spent weeks writing a number of songs "just to have something to play", as Whitlock put it. These songs would later make up the bulk of the material on Layla and Other Assorted Love Songs.

Having toured with Joe Cocker straight after leaving Delaney & Bonnie, Carl Radle and Jim Gordon reunited with Clapton and Whitlock in England. Clapton attempted to avoid the limelight under cover of the anonymous "Derek and the Dominos", which played a tour of small clubs in Britain during the first three weeks of August. Clapton chose "Derek and the Dominos" because he did not want his name and celebrity to get in the way of maintaining a "band" image. When the tour was over, they headed for Criteria Studios in Miami to record an album.

The source of the album's eventual centrepiece, "Layla", was rooted in Clapton's infatuation with Pattie Boyd, the wife of his friend and Beatle lead guitarist George Harrison, who had joined Clapton as a guitarist on Delaney & Bonnie's European tour in December 1969. Dave Marsh, in The Rolling Stone Illustrated History of Rock and Roll, wrote that "there are few moments in the repertoire of recorded rock where a singer or writer has reached so deeply into himself that the effect of hearing them is akin to witnessing a murder, or a suicide … to me, 'Layla' is the greatest of them."

== Duane Allman's arrival ==
Veteran producer Tom Dowd was at Criteria working on the Allman Brothers Band's second album, Idlewild South, when the studio received a phone call that Clapton was bringing the Dominos to Miami to record. Upon hearing this, guitarist Duane Allman indicated that he would love to drop by and watch, if Clapton approved.

Allman later called Dowd to let him know that his band was in town to perform a benefit concert on 26 August. When Clapton learned of this he insisted on going to see their show, saying, "You mean that guy who plays on the back of (Wilson Pickett's) 'Hey Jude'? … I want to see him play … let's go." Stage hands seated Clapton and company in front of the barricade separating the audience from the stage. When they sat down, Allman was playing a solo. As he turned around and opened his eyes and saw Clapton, he froze. Dickey Betts, the Allmans' other lead guitarist, picked up where Allman left off, but when he followed Allman's eyes to Clapton, he had to turn his back to keep from freezing, himself.

After the show, Allman asked Clapton if he could come by the studio to watch some recording sessions, but Clapton invited him there directly, saying: "Bring your guitar; you got to play!" Jamming together overnight, the two bonded; Dowd reported that they "were trading licks, they were swapping guitars, they were talking shop and information and having a ball – no holds barred, just admiration for each other's technique and facility." Clapton wrote later in his autobiography that he and Allman were inseparable during the sessions in Florida; he talked about Allman as the "musical brother I'd never had but wished I did".

== Recording ==
The majority of the songs on Layla and Other Assorted Love Songs were products of Clapton and Whitlock's collaboration, which produced six of the nine originals on the recording, with five covers making up the balance. Clapton used a diminutive 5-watt tweed Fender Champ during the sessions, which has grown to legend since.

=== Original songs ===
Clapton and Whitlock co-wrote "I Looked Away", "Keep on Growing", "Anyday", "Bell Bottom Blues", "Tell the Truth" and "Why Does Love Got to Be So Sad?" Whitlock also contributed "Thorn Tree in the Garden", while Clapton brought "I Am Yours" (from a poem by Nizami) and "Layla" (with a coda credited to Jim Gordon).

"Tell the Truth" had been initially recorded with an upbeat tempo in June 1970 with producer Phil Spector. It was issued as a single, with "Roll It Over" on the B-side. However, as Whitlock recalls, Spector's Wall of Sound approach did not fit the band's style, and they had the single withdrawn. On 28 August, with Allman contributing slide, the song was recorded as a long and slow instrumental jam. The version with vocals released on Layla captures the jam's slower pace. Both vocal versions were later included on the 1972 compilation The History of Eric Clapton.

The last track on the album, "Thorn Tree in the Garden", was recorded with Whitlock, Clapton, Allman, Radle and Gordon sitting in a circle around a single microphone.

=== Covers ===
The album's five covers included the blues standards "Nobody Knows You When You're Down and Out" (Jimmy Cox), "Key to the Highway" (Charles Segar, Willie Broonzy), and "Have You Ever Loved a Woman" (Billy Myles), a version of Jimi Hendrix's "Little Wing", and an up-tempo take on Chuck Willis's doo-wop ballad "It's Too Late".

According to Dowd, the recording of "Key to the Highway" was unplanned, triggered by the band hearing Sam Samudio performing the song for his album Sam, Hard and Heavy in another room at the studio. As the Dominos spontaneously started playing it themselves, Dowd told the engineers to roll tape, resulting in the tune's telltale fade-in. Bobby Whitlock's version of the story is that the tape was rolling non-stop for the entire session, but that Dowd had taken a lavatory break leaving the faders on the mixer down. As the jam began, he came running back into the control room, still pulling up his trousers and yelling, "Push up the faders!"

== Artwork ==
The album's front cover is credited as "Cover painting by Frandsen-De Schomberg with thanks to his son, Emile, for the abuse of his house". Bobby Whitlock revealed in an interview that while they were staying at Emile Frandsen's house in France in August 1970, he took them to his father's studio just after they had made a mess by having an egg fight. There they saw La Fille au Bouquet (Girl with Bouquet), the painting by Émile-Théodore Frandsen de Schomberg that became the cover of Layla. Eric Clapton immediately spotted a likeness between the blonde-haired woman it depicted and Pattie Boyd. Clapton also insisted that the image be used unadorned on the sleeve, with no text added to give either the band's name or the title of the album.

Forty-six years after Frandsen gave the painting to Eric Clapton, it was the subject of a French lawsuit in which Clapton was ordered to pay compensation for altering the image on a cardboard pop-up used on the 40th anniversary reissue of the album. The family of Frandsen de Schomberg, who died in 1969, received €15,000 ($16,400).

Clapton later gave the painting to George Harrison, who subsequently gave the painting to Boyd. Boyd put the painting up for sale at auction at Christie's in February 2024 alongside letters and notes from both Clapton and Harrison, with an estimate of £40-60,000. After a prolonged bidding battle, the painting was sold for £1,976,000.

== Release and reception ==
Atco Records issued Layla and Other Assorted Love Songs in November 1970 in the United States, with a UK release following in December, on Polydor. The album failed to chart in the United Kingdom, while in the US, it peaked at number 16 on the Billboard Top LPs chart. Despite this achievement, Layla was viewed as a commercial failure, according to authors Harry Shapiro and Jan Reid. Dowd later rued the difficulty of getting airplay for the songs on US radio, while Shapiro attributes its lack of success in Britain to minimal promotion by Polydor and what he terms "the unrelenting and monotonous Press litany of a post-Cream withdrawal syndrome". Concerned that the press and the public were unaware of Clapton's involvement, Atco and Polydor distributed badges reading "Derek is Eric".

Layla also flopped critically, according to Shapiro: "As with Eric's first solo album, the reviewers liked the guitars-on-fire-stuff … but regarded the [love songs] as little more than fluff." Writing in Melody Maker, Roy Hollingworth opined that the songs ranged "from the magnificent to a few lengths of complete boredom", and specified: "We have Hendrix's 'Little Wing' played with such spreading beauty that Jimi would surely have clapped till his hands bled, and then we have 'I Am Yours' … a bossa that novas in pitiful directions." While he identified portions of "pretty atrocious vocal work", Hollingworth considered Layla to be "far more musical" than Eric Clapton, and praised Clapton and Allman for "giv[ing] about every superb essay possible on the playing of the electric guitar". Writing in Saturday Review magazine, Ellen Sander described it as "pointless and boring" and "a basket case of an album", and said that Clapton had "all but blown his musical credibility". Grouping the Dominos album with recent releases by Bob Dylan, the Beatles and Stephen Stills, Sander added, "It's [Clapton's] instincts, not his talents, that are out of synch, and he is certainly not alone, nor by any means the worst offender, in depositing garbage into the vault of a guaranteed personal audience." In a more favourable review for Rolling Stone, Ed Leimbacher noted the album's "filler" material but added that "what remains is what you hoped for from the conjunction of Eric's developing style, the Delaney and Bonnie styled rhythm section, and the strengths of 'Skydog' Allman's session abilities." Leimbacher found Clapton's singing "always at least adequate, and sometimes quite good" and concluded, "forget any indulgences and filler – it's still one hell of an album."

In a rave review for The Village Voice, Robert Christgau applauded the contrast of "the high-keyed precision of [Clapton's] guitar" with "the relaxed rocking of Allman/Whitlock/Radle/Gordon". He wrote in conclusion that, "even though this one has the look of a greedy, lazy, slapdash studio session, I think it may be Eric Clapton's most consistent recording ... one of those rare instances when musicians join together for profit and a lark and come up with a mature and original sound." Christgau rewarded the album with a rare A+ grade. In a review for the album's 1972 reissue, Ed Naha of Circus called Layla an "amazing collection of Clapton tumblers" and stated, "Clapton shines once again as the high priest of rock guitar."

=== Reappraisal ===
Retrospective professional reviews
Review scores
Source	Rating
AllMusic	5/5 stars
Chicago Tribune	4/4 stars
Christgau's Record Guide	A+
DownBeat	5/5 stars
The Encyclopedia of Popular Music	4/5 stars
MusicHound Rock: The Essential Album Guide	5/5 stars
Q	5/5 stars
Rolling Stone	5/5 stars
Sputnikmusic	5/5
Uncut	4/5 stars

Since its initial reception, Layla has been acclaimed by critics and regarded as Clapton's greatest overall work. In Christgau's Record Guide: Rock Albums of the Seventies (1981), Christgau dubbed it "Clapton's most carefully conceived recording", while admiring the album's "relaxed shuffle and simple rock and roll" and Clapton's "generally warm" singing. Christgau wrote in conclusion: "his meaning is realized at those searing peaks when a pained sense of limits – why does love have to be so sad, I got the bell-bottom blues, Lay-la – is posed against the good times in an explosive compression of form." Anthony DeCurtis of Rolling Stone called the album "a masterpiece" and praised its raw nature, writing that "the playing on the album, too, teeters on the edge of chaos but never tips."

AllMusic editor Stephen Thomas Erlewine praised Allman's slide guitar work for "push[ing] Clapton to new heights" and stated, "what really makes Layla such a powerful record is that Clapton, ignoring the traditions that occasionally painted him into a corner, simply tears through these songs with burning, intense emotion." Andy Gill of The Independent complimented the album's "blues standards and sensitive originals" and noted Clapton's fiery affinity with Allman, whom Gill writes "would ensure the epochal status" of the album. Yahoo! Music's Dave DiMartino also noted Allman's "stinging guitarwork" and described Layla as "Clapton's masterwork, and one of the finest rock 'n' roll albums of the '70s", commenting that "this best-selling double LP established Clapton's post-Cream superstardom." Jim DeRogatis of the Chicago Sun-Times called it "the strongest recording of Eric Clapton’s career, and arguably the greatest blues-rock album ever made", while Chicago Tribune critic Greg Kot hailed it as Clapton's "blues-rock guitar masterpiece".

== Live performances ==
Derek and the Dominos went on tour to support Layla and performances from the October–December 1970 US tour were released in January 1973 on In Concert. Allman never toured with Derek and the Dominos, but made two guest appearances with them: on 1 December 1970 at the Curtis Hixon Hall in Tampa (Soul Mates bootleg LP) and the following day at Onondaga County War Memorial in Syracuse, New York.

The band appeared on The Johnny Cash Show, which became their only television appearance. Filmed at the Grand Ole Opry House in Nashville, Tennessee, and broadcast on 6 January 1971, the band performed "It's Too Late" and then joined Cash and Carl Perkins for the Perkins' classic, "Matchbox".

Clapton continued to play the song "Layla" live, as at Live Aid (in Philadelphia) in 1985. In 2006, Clapton and J.J. Cale recorded The Road to Escondido, on which Allman Brothers guitarist Derek Trucks played guitar. Following this, Clapton went on tour with Trucks as part of his band. Clapton explained later that playing with Trucks made him feel like he was in Derek and the Dominos again. As the tour progressed the set changed, with the first half of the show consisting entirely of songs from Layla and Other Assorted Love Songs and culminating in "Layla".

Tedeschi Trucks Band covered the album in its entirety on 24 August 2019 at Lockn' with Trey Anastasio of Phish and Doyle Bramhall II sitting in.

== Compact disc releases ==
There are at least nine distinct releases of Layla and Other Assorted Love Songs on compact disc:

1. The 1983 two-CD set (one per LP) on RSO Records, 16-bit remastering;
2. The Layla Sessions, the 18 September 1990, remixed on one CD, with two additional "sessions discs";
3. The 15 September 1993, Mobile Fidelity Sound Lab 24-kt limited edition gold CD release, 20-bit remastering;
4. The 20 August 1996, Polydor 20-bit remaster, part of the Eric Clapton Remasters series;
5. The 9 November 2004, Polydor hybrid SACD/CD remaster;
6. The 21 March 2011, UMC, 40th Anniversary remaster;
7. The 25 Sep 2013, Universal Music Japan Japanese Platinum SHM-CD remaster.
8. 25 Feb 2017 “Derek and the Dominos/Layla” Mobile Fidelity SACD
9. The 22 Sep 2020, Derek and the Dominos / Layla 50th anniversary sets

The first CD release (manufactured in 1983 in Japan) is a two-CD version. Because this album is more than 77 minutes it did not fit onto early CDs, which had a maximum play time of approximately 74 and a half minutes. The first CD was full of tape hiss, since it was made from a tape copy many generations removed from the original 1970 stereo master. This mastering's negative reception motivated at least one attempt to remaster the CD during the 1980s. Improvements, however, were not very significant because the original 1970 stereo master tapes could not be found at the time.

To mark the album's twentieth anniversary in 1990, an extended version of the album was released as a deluxe three-CD set, with extensive liner notes titled The Layla Sessions: 20th Anniversary Edition. The first disc has the same tracks as the original LP, remixed in stereo from the 16-track analog source tapes and digitally remastered. This 1990 remix, issued by Polydor, has also been released as a single CD apart from the box set. The remix has some significant changes including center placement of the bass, which in the original mix was often mixed into either the left or right channel. The other two discs of The Layla Sessions include a number of jam sessions, including the historic jam from the night that Clapton and Allman met. Also included were out-takes of some of the songs, and the previously unreleased tracks "Mean Old World", "It Hurts Me Too", and "Tender Love".

In 1993, Mobile Fidelity Sound Lab gave the original 1970 stereo master tapes meticulous treatment for the first time and pressed the album on an expensive, limited edition 24kt gold CD. This MFSL 20-bit remastering of Layla preserved more of the fidelity of the original recordings than had previously been heard on CD. The MFSL version was significantly cleaner than the first CD releases, but also removed some of "Wall of Sound"-like technique that was added during mastering for vinyl. Polydor's 1996 remaster as part of the Eric Clapton Remasters series was done in much the same manner as the MFSL version, but on a standard aluminum CD at a normal price. The Polydor 2004 SACD/CD dual-layer hybrid release remixed the album in 5.1 surround sound on the SACD layer and remastered the 1970 stereo version yet again on the CD layer.

The 2011, 40th Anniversary Edition comes in two versions. The two-CD "Deluxe" edition features five previously unreleased tracks, "It's Too Late", "Got to Get Better in a Little While", "Matchbox" (with Carl Perkins) and "Blues Power" (from The Johnny Cash Show) and a jam version of "Got to Get Better in a Little While". The "Super Deluxe" version comprises the two-CD "Deluxe" album, a 5.1 Surround Sound DVD of the album, a newly remastered In Concert two-CD set, a double LP version of the album, a hardcover book, and a number of other extras.

In 2013, the album was released on Blu-ray High Fidelity Pure Audio disc. This release contains three different 24-bit/96 kHz encodings of the stereo mix, in PCM, DTS-HD Master Audio and Dolby TrueHD formats, each with a slightly different EQ, but did not include either 5.1 mix from the 2004 or 2011 releases.

In September 2013, Universal Music Japan issued a remastered version of Layla on SHM-CD, edited in DSD at Universal Music Studios, Tokyo. The DSD source was flat-transferred from analogue master tapes at Sterling Sound in New York City in 2013.

In February 2017, Mobile Fidelity released a hybrid SACD of the original stereo mix. The album comes in a replica gatefold sleeve and is mastered by Rob LoVerde.

== Track listing ==
Side one
No.	Title	Writer(s)	Length
1.	"I Looked Away"	Eric Clapton; Bobby Whitlock	3:05
2.	"Bell Bottom Blues"	Clapton; Whitlock	5:02
3.	"Keep on Growing"	Clapton; Whitlock	6:21
4.	"Nobody Knows You When You're Down and Out"	Jimmy Cox	4:57

Side two
No.	Title	Writer(s)	Length
1.	"I Am Yours"	Clapton; Nizami Ganjavi	3:34
2.	"Anyday"	Clapton; Whitlock	6:35
3.	"Key to the Highway"	Charlie Segar; Willie Broonzy	9:40

Side three
No.	Title	Writer(s)	Length
1.	"Tell the Truth"	Clapton; Whitlock	6:39
2.	"Why Does Love Got to Be So Sad?"	Clapton; Whitlock	4:41
3.	"Have You Ever Loved a Woman"	Billy Myles	6:52

Side four
No.	Title	Writer(s)	Length
1.	"Little Wing"	Jimi Hendrix	5:33
2.	"It's Too Late"	Chuck Willis	3:47
3.	"Layla"	Clapton; Jim Gordon	7:05
4.	"Thorn Tree in the Garden"	Whitlock	2:53
Total length:			76:44

All four sides of the original LP were combined into one disc in most CD versions. The LP was re-released on 180g vinyl by Simply Vinyl in the 1990s and re-mastered and re-released on 180g vinyl by Universal Music in 2008.

=== 40th Anniversary Deluxe and Super Deluxe Edition ===
Disc two
No.	Title	Writer(s)	Length
1.	"Mean Old World"	Walter Jacobs	3:52
2.	"Roll It Over"	Clapton; Whitlock	4:31
3.	"Tell the Truth" (Single Version)	Clapton; Whitlock	3:23
4.	"It's Too Late" (Live on The Johnny Cash Show, 11/05/1970)	Chuck Willis	4:11
5.	"Got to Get Better in a Little While" (Live on The Johnny Cash Show, 11/05/1970)	Clapton	6:34
6.	"Matchbox" (Live on The Johnny Cash Show, 11/05/1970 featuring Johnny Cash and Carl Perkins)	Carl Perkins	3:56
7.	"Blues Power" (Live on The Johnny Cash Show, 11/05/1970)	Clapton; Leon Russell	6:31
8.	"Snake Lake Blues" (New Mix)	Clapton; Whitlock	3:34
9.	"Evil" (New Mix)	Willie Dixon	4:34
10.	"Mean Old Frisco" (New Mix)	Arthur Crudup	4:04
11.	"One More Chance" (New Mix)	Clapton	3:15
12.	"Got to Get Better in a Little While" (Jam)	Clapton	3:45
13.	"Got to Get Better in a Little While" (New Mix)	Clapton	6:05

== Personnel ==
Personnel taken from Layla and Other Assorted Love Songs liner notes.

Derek and the Dominos

- Eric Clapton – guitars, lead vocals
- Bobby Whitlock – organ, piano, vocals, acoustic guitar
- Carl Radle – bass guitar, percussion
- Jim Gordon – drums, percussion, piano, tape loops (track 13)
- Duane Allman – guitars (track 4 of Side 1 plus all tracks on Sides 2, 3 and 4)

Additional performer

- Albhy Galuten – piano (track 4)

Production

- Tom Dowd – executive production
- Derek and the Dominos (Eric Clapton, Bobby Whitlock, Carl Radle, Jim Gordon) – production
- Ron Albert – engineering
- Chuck Kirkpatrick – engineering
- Howie Albert – engineering
- Karl Richardson – engineering
- Mac Emmerman – engineering
- Dennis M. Drake – mastering
- Emile Théodore Frandsen de Schomberg – cover painting "La Fille au Bouquet"

The Layla Sessions

- Dan Gellert – assistant engineering
- Scott Hull – digital editing
- Mitchell Kanner – art direction
- George Lebon – art direction
- Bill Levenson – production
- Bob Ludwig – mastering
- Steve Rinkoff – mixer
- Gene Santoro – notes

== Singles ==
- "Tell the Truth/Roll It Over" (both non-album tracks) (Atco Records in US, Polydor in UK, 1970) (withdrawn)
- "Bell Bottom Blues/Keep on Growing" (Atco in US, Polydor most other countries, 1971)
- "Layla/I Am Yours" (Atco in US, Polydor most other countries, 1971)
- "Layla/Bell Bottom Blues" (Polydor, 1972) (UK only)
- "Bell Bottom Blues/Little Wing" (RSO, 1973)
- "Layla" (Universal, 2004)

== Certifications ==
Region	Certification	Certified units/sales
Canada (Music Canada)	Gold	50,000^{^}
United Kingdom (BPI)	Platinum	300,000^{‡}
United Kingdom (BPI) 2008 Re-release	Gold	100,000^{‡}
United States (RIAA)	Gold	500,000^{^}
^{^} Shipments figures based on certification alone.^{‡} Sales+streaming figures based on certification alone.

== Bibliography ==
- jake s. "115: Layla and Other Assorted Love Songs, Derek and the Dominos". The RS 500 Greatest Albums of All Time. Rolling Stone. Archived from the original on 4 December 2009.
- "Allman, Duane". Where's Eric. Archived from the original on 31 October 2009.
- Clapton, Eric (2007). Clapton: the autobiography. Random House. p. 128. ISBN 978-0-385-51851-2.
- "Derek and the Dominos – "Layla" hand-embellished digital print on canvas". Archived from the original on 15 July 2011.
- Gambaccini, Paul (1987). The Top 100 Rock 'n' Roll Albums of All Time. Harmony Books.
- Poe, Randy (2008). Skydog: The Duane Allman Story. New York: Backbeat. ISBN 978-0-87930-939-8.
- Reid, Jan (2006). Layla and Other Assorted Love Songs by Derek and the Dominos. New York, NY: Rodale. ISBN 978-1-59486-369-1.
- Robbins, Ira (10 April 1990). "Rev. of The Layla Sessions". Rolling Stone.
- Sandford, Christopher (1999). Clapton: Edge of Darkness. New York, NY: Da Capo Press. ISBN 0-306-80897-8.
- Santoro, Gene (1995). Dancing in Your Head: Jazz, Blues, Rock, and Beyond. New York, NY: Oxford University Press. ISBN 0-19-510123-5.
- Shapiro, Harry (1992). Eric Clapton: Lost in the Blues. New York, NY: Da Capo Press. ISBN 0-306-80480-8.
- Welch, Chris (2016). Clapton - Updated Edition: The Ultimate Illustrated History. Voyageur Press. ISBN 978-0-760-35019-5.
