= Gene Santoro =

American writer and music journalist

Gene Santoro (October 31, 1950 – April 27, 2022) was an American writer, author, music critic, and music journalist. He was a columnist for the New York Daily News, Chamber Music, The Nation, and Pulse!. His writing also appeared in Guitar World, The New York Times, Musician, The Washington Post, Spin, Time, DownBeat, The Atlantic, New York Post, and Guitar Player.

== Early life and education ==
Gene Santoro was born on October 31, 1950, in Brooklyn, New York. In his childhood he lived in the Bay Ridge and the Bensonhurst neighborhoods of his native city. He moved with his family to Jamaica, Queens where he lived while attending Regis High School in Manhattan. At Regis he wrote music criticism for the school newspaper, often covering concerts given at Steve Paul's The Scene; including performances by Buddy Guy and Jimi Hendrix. He also started his own band as a teenager which played at weddings and bar mitzvahs.

After completing high school, Santoro studied music at first the City University of New York and then in the guitar program at The New School for Social Research. He dropped out of school and spent a year serving in the United States Army Reserve during the Vietnam War in 1971. In 1972 he married Tesse Viola and spent the first two years of his marriage working as an electronics tech. He formed the rock band Euphoria with whom he toured in 1974–1975. After this he returned to school, and completed his bachelor of music degree at Queens College, City University of New York in 1976. He then pursued graduate studies at Stanford University where he earned a master's degree in 1979. While at Stanford he was a Fulbright Scholar in 1978–1979.

== Career ==
Santaro was a columnist and critic for Pulse! from 1983 through 1991, and was also a regular contributor to DownBeat from 1984 to 1993. He was a longtime music critic for The Nation; a role he began in 1986. From 1987 to 1989 he was a critic for the New York magazine 7 Days, and from 1988 through 1990 he was both a music critic and a features writer for the New York Post. In 1991 he began writing for Atlantic Monthly, and that same year joined the music faculty of the City College of New York.

Santaro was a longtime film and jazz critic for the New York Daily News; beginning writing for that paper in 1993. He was the author of several books, including Myself When I Am Real: The Life and Music of Charles Mingus (finalist for the 2001 Ralph J. Gleason Awards and the 2001 Jazz Journalists Association Awards), Highway 61 Revisited, Dancing in Your Head, and Stir It Up. He co-authored and edited The Guitar: The History, The Music, The Players.

Santoro contributed articles on rock music to the Encyclopædia Britannica and The Encyclopedia of New York City and was a member of the editorial board of New Grove Dictionary of Jazz. His writing also appeared in Guitar World, The New York Times, Musician, The Washington Post, Spin, Time, DownBeat, The Atlantic, New York Post, and Guitar Player. He has appeared on radio and television shows such as All Things Considered and Fresh Air. From the mid-1980s, he also wrote liner notes for a number of jazz and rock albums, including E.S.P. by Miles Davis and Layla and Other Assorted Love Songs by Derek and the Dominos, as well as recordings by Larry Coryell, Country Joe McDonald, Mark Dresser, Vince Guaraldi, Mahavishnu Orchestra, Stanley Turrentine and Rod Stewart. In his later years, he was a book reviewer for The New York Times, a columnist for Chamber Music America, and a writer/editor for Music Aficionado.

In 2000 Santoro published a biography on jazz musician Charles Mingus.

Santoro died at the age of 71 from complications of esophageal cancer.

== Publications ==
- The Guitar: The History, The Music, The Players (1984) ISBN 978-0688019730
- Dancing in Your Head: Jazz, Blues, Rock, and Beyond (1994) ISBN 978-0195078879
- Stir It Up: Musical Mixes from Roots to Jazz (1997) ISBN 978-0195098693
- Myself When I Am Real: The Life and Music of Charles Mingus (2000) ISBN 978-0195147117.
- Highway 61 Revisited: The Tangled Roots of American Jazz, Blues, Rock, & Country Music (2004) ISBN 978-0195154818
