= Crossroads Guitar Festival 2007 =

- Directed by: Martyn Atkins
- Cinematography: Jürg V. Walther
- Edited by: William Bullen
- Distributed by: Rhino · Warner
- Release date: November 28, 2007 (United States)
- Running time: 240 minutes
- Language: English

Crossroads Guitar Festival 2007 is the Rhino Entertainment and Warner Brothers release to the 2007 Eric Clapton Crossroads Guitar Festival. The concert was recorded on July 28, 2007 at the Toyota Park in Bridgeview, Illinois. The recordings were released on both Compact Disc and DVD on November 28, 2007 in the United States. The CD and DVD releases sold more than two million copies worldwide and reached various international charts.

== Background ==
All of the 28,000 concert tickets had been sold in less than 22 minutes, topping the international concert sales chart in May 2007. All the ticket sales proceeds from the event as well as the CD and DVD sales proceeds goes directly to the Crossroads Foundation. The actual amount of recording that was done throughout the whole concert day was eleven hours. The events host was Bill Murray, who also played "Gloria" with Clapton at the beginning of the event. Murray guided the viewers throughout the event, introduced artists and recalled a little bit of their impact on the American music scene. He also put on iconic outfits, that Clapton wore during his career: the suit and hair Clapton wore, when performing for the Rainbow Concert in 1973 and being with the band Cream throughout the 1960s.

== Critical reception ==
AllMusic critic Hal Horowitz rates the release with four out of possible five stars and thinks that "Guitar is the operative word here, since all the participants are six-string players". Horowitz also rates the variety of music genres as superb and sums his review up by saying: "The DTS surround sound is superb, the camera work classy if occasionally too arty, and the top-notch presentation worthy of the high-quality music and artists involved".

=== Accolades ===
Year	Award	Category	Work	Result
2008	Primetime Emmy Awards	Outstanding Special Class	Crossroads Guitar Festival 2007	Won

== Track listing ==
=== Disc 1 ===
1. Introduction (Bill Murray)
2. Uberesso (Sonny Landreth)
3. Hell at Home (Sonny Landreth with Eric Clapton)
4. Maharina (John McLaughlin)
5. Rosie (Doyle Bramhall II)
6. Outside Woman Blues (Doyle Bramhall II)
7. Little by Little (Susan Tedeschi with The Derek Trucks Band)
8. Anyday (The Derek Trucks Band)
9. Highway 61 Revisited (Johnny Winter with The Derek Trucks Band)
10. Nobodysoul (Robert Randolph & The Family Band)
11. Poor Johnny (The Robert Cray Band)
12. Dirty Work at the Crossroads (Jimmie Vaughan with The Robert Cray Band)
13. Sitting on Top of the World (Hubert Sumlin with The Robert Cray Band & Jimmie Vaughan)
14. Paying the Cost to Be the Boss (B.B. King with The Robert Cray Band with Jimmie Vaughan & Hubert Sumlin)
15. Rock Me Baby (B.B. King with The Robert Cray Band with Jimmie Vaughan & Hubert Sumlin)
16. Sweet Thing (Vince Gill)
17. Country Boy (Albert Lee with Vince Gill)
18. If It Makes You Happy (Sheryl Crow with Vince Gill & Albert Lee)
19. Tulsa Time (Sheryl Crow with Eric Clapton, Vince Gill & Albert Lee)
20. Blue Eyes Crying in the Rain (Willie Nelson with Vince Gill & Albert Lee)
21. On the Road Again (Willie Nelson with Sheryl Crow, Vince Gill & Albert Lee)

=== Disc 2 ===
1. Belief (John Mayer)
2. Gravity (John Mayer)
3. Don’t Worry Baby (Los Lobos)
4. Mas y Mas (Los Lobos)
5. Cause We’ve Ended as Lovers (Jeff Beck)
6. Big Block (Jeff Beck)
7. Tell the Truth (Eric Clapton feat. Derek Trucks)
8. Isn't It a Pity (Eric Clapton)
9. Little Queen of Spades (Eric Clapton feat. Derek Trucks)
10. Who Do You Love? (Robbie Robertson with Eric Clapton)
11. Presence of the Lord (Steve Winwood and Eric Clapton)
12. Can't Find My Way Home (Steve Winwood and Eric Clapton)
13. Had to Cry Today (Steve Winwood and Eric Clapton)
14. Dear Mr. Fantasy (Steve Winwood)
15. Crossroads (Eric Clapton and Steve Winwood)
16. Mary Had a Little Lamb (Buddy Guy)
17. Damn Right I’ve Got the Blues (Buddy Guy)
18. Sweet Home Chicago (Buddy Guy with Eric Clapton, Robert Cray, John Mayer, Hubert Sumlin, Jimmie Vaughan & Johnny Winter)

=== Best Buy exclusive Bonus Disc 3 ===
1. Things Get Better
2. Why Does Love Got to Be So Sad?

== Chart performance ==
=== Weekly charts ===
Chart (2007–2013)	Peak position
Australian Music DVD (ARIA)	13
Dutch Music DVD (MegaCharts)	15
Finnish Music DVD (Suomen virallinen lista)	1
German Albums (Offizielle Top 100)	72
Italian Music DVD (FIMI)	8
Japanese Music DVD (Oricon)	24
New Zealand Music DVD (RMNZ)	2
Norwegian Music DVD (VG-lista)	1
Swedish Music DVD (Sverigetopplistan)	6
UK Music DVD (OCC)	27
US Music Video Sales (Billboard)	3

=== Year-end charts ===
Chart (2007)	Position
Australian Music DVD (ARIA)	42

Chart (2008)	Position
Australian Music DVD (ARIA)	43

== Certifications ==
Region	Certification	Certified units/sales
Australia (ARIA)	3× Platinum	45,000^{^}
France (SNEP)	Gold	10,100
Germany (BVMI)	Gold	25,000^{^}
New Zealand (RMNZ)	2× Platinum	10,000^{^}
United States (RIAA)	6× Platinum	600,000^{^}
^{^} Shipments figures based on certification alone.
