= The History of Eric Clapton =

Compilation album by Eric Clapton
- Released: March 1972
- Recorded: September 1964 – September 1970
- Genres: Rock; blues
- Length: 77:27
- Labels: Polydor (UK); Atco (US)
- Producer: various

Eric Clapton chronology
Layla and Other Assorted Love Songs (1970)	The History of Eric Clapton (1972)	Eric Clapton at His Best (1972)

The History of Eric Clapton is a compilation double LP and single 7.5 IPS reel-to-reel tape, released in 1972 by Polydor Records in the United Kingdom, and Atco Records in the United States. It features Eric Clapton performing in various bands between 1964 and 1970, including The Yardbirds, Cream, Blind Faith and Derek and the Dominos.

The compilation is notable for helping Clapton's career when he was battling heroin addiction and making the song "Layla" famous. It is also notable for being perhaps the first compilation in rock music to collect music of a single rock musician that spans time, bands, music styles and record labels.

The album cover picture was taken at George Harrison's Concert for Bangladesh while Clapton was playing "While My Guitar Gently Weeps" on a Gibson Byrdland hollow-body guitar.

== Content ==
The album has two versions of "Tell the Truth", both different from and recorded before "Tell the Truth" on Layla and Other Assorted Love Songs (1970). "Tell the Truth" on this compilation is a fast up-beat version originally released as a single in July 1970, while "Tell the Truth – Jam" is a long and slow instrumental jam from the Layla sessions which had never been released before. The "Tell the Truth" single also appeared later on Crossroads (1988) and on Layla and Other Assorted Love Songs 40th Anniversary Deluxe and Super Deluxe Edition (2011). "Tell the Truth – Jam" was featured on The Layla Sessions: 20th Anniversary Edition (1990) as "Tell the Truth (Jam #1)"; a second "Tell the Truth" jam, also featured on The Layla Sessions, was unreleased at the time of The History of Eric Clapton compilation.

The U.S. release of this compilation replaced "Tales of Brave Ulysses" with "Tribute to Elmore", a Clapton and Jimmy Page homage to American blues musician Elmore James. "Tribute to Elmore" was one of several jams performed by Clapton, Page and Jeff Beck which were recorded by Page and released later without consulting Clapton or Beck.

== Reception ==
Professional ratings
Review scores
Source	Rating
AllMusic	4.5/5 stars
Christgau's Record Guide	B
New Rolling Stone Record Guide	4/5 stars

In a review at AllMusic, Bruce Eder wrote that the tracks on The History of Eric Clapton "seemed boundless at the time", from the "primitive and straightforward" "I Ain't Got You" to "Layla" at, what was then, the end of his career. What Eder found extraordinary about this 11-song collection is that it, at the time, only covered two years of Clapton's solo career, but "still doesn't make a bad summation of his best work." He added that the "Tell the Truth" jam alone makes The History of Eric Clapton a "priority acquisition," even for Clapton diehards.

Robert Christgau was a little more critical of the album, saying that while it has several "worthwhile oddities" (the "Tell the Truth" single and its studio jam, plus King Curtis' "Teasin'"), he felt that there should have been more from the Yardbirds and the Bluesbreakers.

Reviewing the album in Journal-News in 1972, Michael O'Connor wrote that while many critics belittled the collection, calling it a "rehash" and a "ripoff", he felt that, despite its weaknesses and bad song selection, it is a good introduction to Eric Clapton, and "really isn't that bad a trip". O'Connor praised Clapton's work with Derek and the Dominos on side four, particularly the "Tell the Truth" jam, and concluded that the compilation "wets my appetite for a future album".

== Track listing ==
=== UK tracks ===
Side A
No.	Title	Writer(s)	Performer	Length
1.	"I Ain't Got You"	Calvin Carter	The Yardbirds	2:46
2.	"Hideaway"	Freddie King/Sonny Thompson	John Mayall & the Bluesbreakers	3:13
3.	"Tales of Brave Ulysses"	Eric Clapton/Martin Sharp	Cream	2:46
4.	"I Want to Know"	S. MacLeod (Paul Jones)	Eric Clapton and the Powerhouse	2:14
5.	"Sunshine of Your Love"	Jack Bruce/Pete Brown/Clapton	Cream	4:11
6.	"Crossroads"	Robert Johnson	Cream	4:14

Side B
No.	Title	Writer(s)	Performer	Length
1.	"Spoonful"	Willie Dixon	Cream	16:43
2.	"Badge"	Clapton/George Harrison	Cream	2:45

Side C
No.	Title	Writer(s)	Performer	Length
1.	"Sea of Joy"	Steve Winwood	Blind Faith	5:19
2.	"Only You Know and I Know"	Dave Mason	Delaney & Bonnie	4:18
3.	"I Don't Want to Discuss It"	Beth Beatty/Dick Cooper/Ernie Shelby	Delaney & Bonnie	5:40
4.	"Teasin'"	Curtis Ousley/Delaney Bramlett	King Curtis	2:15
5.	"Blues Power"	Clapton/Leon Russell	Eric Clapton	3:11

Side D
No.	Title	Writer(s)	Performer	Length
1.	"Tell the Truth"	Clapton/Bobby Whitlock	Derek and the Dominos	3:19
2.	"Tell the Truth – Jam"	Clapton/Whitlock	Derek and the Dominos	9:27
3.	"Layla"	Clapton/Jim Gordon	Derek and the Dominos	7:06

=== US tracks ===
On the U.S. Atco LP SD2-803, track 3, "Tales of Brave Ulysses" is replaced with:

Side A
No.	Title	Writer(s)	Performer	Length
3.	"Tribute to Elmore"	Clapton/Jimmy Page	Eric Clapton and Jimmy Page	3:00

== Track notes ==
- A1 – from The Yardbirds Featuring Performances by Jeff Beck, Eric Clapton, Jimmy Page (1970); recorded September 1964
- A2 – from Blues Breakers with Eric Clapton (1966); recorded April 1966
- A3 (UK release) – from Disraeli Gears (1967); recorded May 1967
- A3 (US release) – from Blues Anytime Vol. 1 (1968); recorded June 1965
- A4 – from What's Shakin' (1966); recorded March 1966
- A5 – from Disraeli Gears (1967); recorded May 1967
- A6 – from Wheels of Fire (1968); recorded March 1968
- B1 – from Wheels of Fire (1968); recorded March 1968
- B2 – from Goodbye (1969); recorded October 1968
- C1 – from Blind Faith (1969); recorded June 1969
- C2 – from Delaney & Bonnie & Friends on Tour with Eric Clapton (1970); recorded December 1969
- C3 – from Delaney & Bonnie & Friends on Tour with Eric Clapton (1970); recorded December 1969
- C4 – from Get Ready (1970); recorded January 1970
- C5 – from Eric Clapton (1970); recorded January 1970
- D1 – "Tell the Truth" single (1970); recorded June 1970
- D2 – previously unreleased; recorded August 1970
- D3 – from Layla and Other Assorted Love Songs (1970); recorded August–September 1970

== Charts ==
Year	Chart	Position
1972	US Billboard 200	6

== Works cited ==
- O'Connor, Michael (18 August 1972). "Clapton's 'History' is ... well ... Clapton". Journal-News. pp. 10, 11 – via Newspapers.com.
