= The Stroll =

Line dance popular in the 1950s

The Stroll was both a slow rock 'n' roll dance and a song that was popular in the late 1950s.

Billboard first reported that "the Stroll" might herald a new dance craze similar to the "Big Apple" in December 1957.

In the dance two lines of dancers, men on one side and women on the other, face each other, moving in place to the music. Each paired couple then steps out and does a more elaborate dance up and down between the rows of dancers. Dick Clark noted the similarity of the dance to the Virginia reel. It was first performed to "C. C. Rider" by Chuck Willis on American Bandstand. Link Wray's "Rumble" was also a popular tune for doing the stroll.

The Diamonds had a hit song entitled "The Stroll" in 1957.

When 1950s nostalgia came to the forefront in the 1970s, the Stroll saw renewed public awareness. It was used in the film American Graffiti (1973) during the scene at the high school dance and is mentioned in some of the lyrics in the musical Grease. Led Zeppelin's 1950s rock homage "Rock and Roll" mentions the Stroll.

The Stroll was an integral part of most episodes of the dance TV series Soul Train, where host and creator Don Cornelius dubbed it the "Soul Train Line".
