= Crossroads Guitar Festival 2010 =

- Produced by: Kathy Rivkin
- Starring: Eric Clapton
- Edited by: Mitch Jacobson
- Distributed by: Rhino · Warner
- Release date: November 8, 2010
- Running time: 240 minutes
- Country: United States
- Language: English

Crossroads Guitar Festival 2010 is a concert film released on November 8, 2010, by the British rock musician Eric Clapton under Rhino Records and the Warner Music Group. It is sometimes credited as a "Various Artists" compilation release. The music film features 40 tracks on the DVD and Blu-ray format. Crossroads Guitar Festival 2010 was released worldwide, reached various international music charts and was awarded several certification awards for outstanding sales and shipments.

== Background and release ==
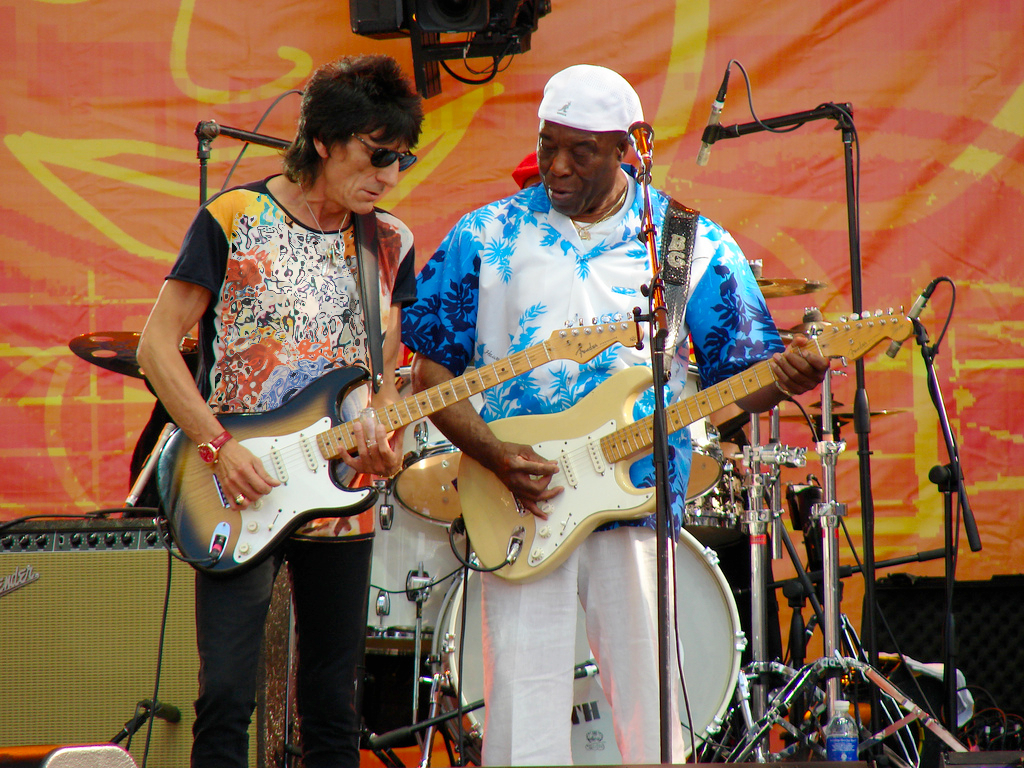
Ronnie Wood and Buddy Guy performing at the festival.

The live concert film features performances by the following artists : Johnny Winter, Eric Clapton, Buddy Guy, Ronnie Wood, Sonny Landreth, Robert Randolph and the Family Band, Robert Cray, Jimmie Vaughan, Hubert Sumlin, ZZ Top, Doyle Bramhall II, Gary Clark Jr., Sheryl Crow, Derek Trucks, Susan Tedeschi, Bert Jansch, Stefan Grossman, Keb Mo', Vince Gill, James Burton, Albert Lee, Earl Klugh, John Mayer Trio, Warren Haynes, David Hidalgo, Cesar Rosas, Chris Stainton, Jonny Lang, Jeff Beck, Citizen Cope, Steve Winwood, B. B. King and Joe Bonamassa. As moderator, Bill Murray was at the festival to help Clapton lead the event.

The concert movie was released in for any territory on two different release dates. On November 8, 2010, Crossroads Guitar Festival 2010 was made available in the United Kingdom and every other country, except the United States. On November 9, 2010, the music film was also released in North America. The release is only available on DVD and Blu-ray format. However, two limited editions have been released in cooperation with Best Buy featuring six unreleased recordings and a Rhino Records special audio compact disc with additional bonus tracks. Crossroads Guitar Festival 2010 was released and is distributed by Rhino Records in corporation with the Warner Music Group. The recording is nearly 240 minutes long and was recorded live at the Toyota Park in Bridgeview, Illinois on June 26, 2010. The previous Crossroads Guitar Festival was also held at the same venue in the summer of 2007.

== Chart performance ==
In Austria, the release peaked at number two on the official Ö3 Austria Top 10 and SNEP music DVD chart in Austria and France. In Belgium, the DVD reached position nine in Flanders and ten in Wallonia, making it one of the rare Eric Clapton DVDs to chart on Ultratop in the country. In the Netherlands and Italy, Crossroads Guitar Festival peaked at number three, where as in Finland and Switzerland the video release peaked at number four on the music charts. In Portugal and Spain, the release was a little less successful, reaching only eleven and thirteen on the nation's DVD chart. In the United Kingdom, Germany and Japan, the concert movie ranked at the lowest places, charting at number 20, 25 and 30. However, the release topped the music charts in the United States, Norway, Denmark and Sweden. The release was also listed on three end of the year charts, indicating outstanding sales and shipment figures while on chart. Crossroads Guitar Festival 2010 reached the positions 33, 37 and 38 in the Netherlands, Portugal and Australia. The concert DVD was awarded several Gold discs to commemorate special sales and shipment figures in Portugal, Spain and Poland. In addition, it was awarded Platinum certifications in Brazil, Denmark, Germany and Sweden. In the United States, the release was certified four-times Platinum for shipments over 400,000 copies alone. In total, the release has sold more than 570,000 copies.

The 29,000 concert tickets for the show were sold out in five minutes. The average ticket price was $67 US Dollar. The created a grossing of $1,943,000. The release on video format is estimated to have grossed a total of $12,000,000. The budget is unknown.

== Reception ==
Shortly after the festival was over, Clapton called the event "a great success", noting the reason being "good weather, great crowd, and the fact, that [he] has done it [at the Toyota Park] previously made it a familliar venue for everybody. It was like everyone came back, knowing what they were getting into. It is kinda like the usual suspects now. There is a core group of players and people, that want to do it". Being asked about the success of his "Crossroads"-releases, Clapton recalled the key players of the event that led to the success of the concert film releases: "Vince Gill, ZZ Top, Sonny Landreth, Jimmie Vaughan, Buddy Guy, the list goes on now". Clapton also noted in the interview, that he did not like the last jam at the end of the concert, because it featured over 25 guitar players. The British rock and blues musician noted, that he wanted to play with Pino Daniele and Johnny Lang, but did not get a chance to jam with them on stage, because it is very difficult to marshall the guitar festival properly. Talking about his performance at 8 o'clock in the evening, Clapton recalled that he "conserves some energy, but paced himself all wrong this time" and was "shattered [with] nothing to give," but also notes that he was "match fit" for the concert and "very happy".

=== Critical ===
Music journalist Jon Pareles from The New York Times called the release atmosphere "decidedly old-fashioned" and liked the fact that "every note, give or take an echo effect, was played by hand." Pareles liked the release and noted the "excellent performances" on the concert DVD. All·About·Jazz reporter Doug Collette finds, "this double DVD, reaffirms Eric Clapton's serious intent to showcase the art of the guitar and his own devotion to the blues". Music critic Jeffrey Kauffman from the Blu-ray Disc Association awarded the release four and a half points out of five. Swiss music critic Michael Herb from String Works calls the release "a great investment" and especially liked the way the artists were presented on the video footage. He also noted that the production is "perfect". He awarded the release seven out of a possible ten stars. Rick Moore from the American Songwriter awards the release four out of five possible stars, noting: "The direction by veteran music video and documentary director Martyn Atkins is top-notch, as is the editing, with appropriate amounts of time spent on close-ups, wide shots and backstage footage. Sometimes the narration by the artists talking about each other is a little hard to follow, and the DVD's climax with B.B. King is almost a little anticlimactic. But that's definitely splitting hairs. Guitar players, and fans of guitar players – especially blues-influenced ones – should love this DVD. It's also available in blu-ray, and a great idea for Christmas".

== Chart positions ==
=== Weekly charts ===
Chart (2010–2015)	Peak position
Argentinian Music DVD (CAPIF)	5
Austrian Music DVD (Ö3 Austria)	2
Belgian Music DVD (Ultratop Flanders)	9
Belgian Music DVD (Ultratop Wallonia)	10
Danish Music DVD (Hitlisten)	1
Dutch Music DVD (MegaCharts)	3
Finnish Music DVD (Suomen virallinen lista)	4
French Music DVD (SNEP)	2
German Albums (Offizielle Top 100)	25
Italian Music DVD (FIMI)	3
Japanese Music DVD (Oricon)	30
New Zealand Music DVD (RMNZ)	1
Norwegian Music DVD (VG-lista)	1
Portuguese Music DVD (AFP)	11
Spanish Music DVD (PROMUSICAE)	13
Swedish Music DVD (Sverigetopplistan)	1
Swiss Music DVD (Schweizer Hitparade)	4
UK Music DVD (OCC)	20
US Music DVD (Billboard)	1

=== Year-end charts ===
Chart (2010)	Position
Australian DVD Albums (ARIA)	38
Dutch Music DVD (MegaCharts)	33
Portuguese Music DVD (AFP)	37

== Certifications ==
Region	Certification	Certified units/sales
Brazil (Pro-Música Brasil)	Platinum	30,000^{*}
Denmark (IFPI Danmark)	Platinum	30,000^{^}
Germany (BVMI)	Platinum	50,000^{^}
New Zealand (RMNZ)	3× Platinum	15,000^{^}
Poland (ZPAV)	Gold	5,000^{*}
Portugal (AFP)	Gold	4,000^{^}
Spain (Promusicae)	Gold	10,000^{^}
Sweden (GLF)	Platinum	20,000^{^}
United States (RIAA)	4× Platinum	400,000^{^}
^{*} Sales figures based on certification alone.^{^} Shipments figures based on certification alone.
