= Anyday (song) =

Song by Derek and the Dominos

from the album Layla and Other Assorted Love Songs
- Released: November 9, 1970
- Genre: Blues rock
- Length: 6:35
- Label: Polydor
- Songwriter(s): Eric Clapton · Bobby Whitlock
- Producer(s): Tom Dowd, Derek and the Dominos

"Anyday" is a song written by British rock guitarist and singer Eric Clapton and American singer-songwriter Bobby Whitlock for the Derek and the Dominos album Layla and Other Assorted Love Songs which was released in 1970. It was written at Clapton’s home when the two of them were playing guitar in different tunings. Open D was the one they chose. Over the years, the tune was newly interpreted by both Clapton and Whitlock who also released their takes on the song on both studio and live albums in 2003 and 2016.

The song features double guitar parts played by both Clapton and Duane Allman. Clapton specifically asked Allman to sit in for the sessions after seeing him perform with the Allman Brothers. On the recording, Allman plays the guitar solo. The intro of the song as well as the verse are written in the key of A major, while the chorus and outro is written in the key of D major.

In 2003, Whitlock recorded an acoustic version of "Anyday" for his studio album Other Assorted Love Songs which was released through his own independent record label Domino Records. During his "Doyle & Derek World Tour", Clapton performed the song; a bootleg recording from May 9, 2006 was named after the song. He also performed the song in 2009 with the Allman Brothers and Susan Tedeschi. The song was performed at the Crossroads Guitar Festival 2010.

In 2016, Clapton released a live version of the song on his album Live in San Diego.
