= Pulse! (magazine) =

American music magazine

Pulse! was a tabloid magazine published by Tower Records (under the direction of VP of Publishing Mike Farrace) which contained record reviews, interviews and advertising.

== History and profile ==
Pulse! was started in 1983. The magazine was published on a monthly basis. Initially, it was given away free in their stores to promote their record sales.

In 1992, Pulse! began national distribution with a cover price of $2.95.

Pulse! was cancelled in 2002 when the company discontinued U.S. operations. The last of the 222 issues appeared in December 2002.
