= It's Too Late (Chuck Willis song) =

Single by Chuck Willis

from the album King of the Stroll
- B-side: "Kansas City Woman"
- Released: May 1956
- Genre: R&B; soul; pop
- Length: 2:34
- Label: Atlantic
- Songwriter(s): Chuck Willis

Chuck Willis singles chronology
"It Were You" (1956)	"It's Too Late" (1956)	"Juanita" (1956)

"It's Too Late" is a song written by and performed by Chuck Willis. It reached No. 3 on the U.S. R&B chart in 1956. The song was featured on his 1958 album, King of the Stroll.

== Other charting versions ==
- Johnny O'Keefe released a version of the song as a single in Australia in 1960 which reached No. 17.
- Ted Taylor released a version of the song which reached No. 30 on the U.S. R&B chart and No. 118 on the U.S. pop chart in 1969.

== Other versions ==
- Dorothy Collins released a version of the song as the B-side to her 1957 single "Rock Me My Baby".
- The Crickets released a version of the song on their 1957 album The "Chirping" Crickets.
- Roy Orbison released a version of the song on his 1961 album At the Rock House.
- Les Paul and Mary Ford released a version of the song as the B-side to their 1961 single "Mountain Railroad".
- Charlie Rich released a version of the song as the B-side to his 1961 single "Just a Little Bit Sweet".
- Ruth Brown released a version of the song on her 1962 album Along Came Ruth.
- Jerry Keller released a version of the song as the B-side to his 1963 single "What Will I Tell My Darling?"
- Sunny and the Sunliners released a version of the song as a single in 1964, but it did not chart.
- Otis Redding released a version of the song on his 1965 album The Great Otis Redding Sings Soul Ballads.
- Freddie King released a version of the song on his 1969 album Freddie King Is a Blues Master.
- Derek and the Dominos released a version of the song on their 1970 album Layla and Other Assorted Love Songs. The band also performed the song on The Johnny Cash Show which was the band's only television appearance.
- John Hammond released a version of the song on his 1970 album Southern Fried.
- Conway Twitty released a version of the song on his 1976 album 20 Greatest Hits by Conway Twitty.
- Freddy Fender released a version of the song on his 1972 album If You're Ever in Texas.
- Merl Saunders, Jerry Garcia, John Kahn, and Bill Vitt released a version of the song on their 1988 album Keystone Encores.
- The Alligators featuring The Jordanaires released a version of the song on their 1996 album The History of Rock'n'Roll.

== Samplings ==
- Kanye West sampled Redding's version in the song "Gone" on his 2005 album Late Registration.
