= Nobody Knows You When You're Down and Out =

Early blues standard written by Jimmie Cox

Single by Bessie Smith
- B-side: "Take It Right Back"
- Released: September 13, 1929
- Recorded: New York City, May 15, 1929
- Genre: Blues
- Length: 3:00
- Label: Columbia
- Songwriter: Jimmie Cox

"Nobody Knows You When You're Down and Out" is a blues standard written by pianist Jimmie Cox in 1923 and originally performed in a Vaudeville-blues style in the aftermath of the 1920–1921 U.S. economic depression. A later 1929 recording by Bessie Smith became popular during the early years of the Great Depression due to the lyrics highlighting the fleeting nature of material wealth and the friendships that come and go with it. Since Smith's 1929 recording, the song has been interpreted by numerous musicians in a variety of styles.

== Lyrics and composition ==
In 1923, Jimmie Cox composed the song following the 1920–1921 economic depression. The depression occurred amid a post–World War I recession that affected much of the world's leading economies. During this period, the U.S. economy experienced a severe downturn, and unemployment skyrocketed. It was the largest one-year economic decline in nearly a century and a half—far worse than any year during the Great Depression. Reflecting this unexpected economic downturn, the song's lyrics form a cautionary tale about the fickle nature of fortune and its attendant relationships:

Once I lived the life of a millionaire, spendin' my money I didn't have a care
I carried my friends out for a good time, buying bootleg liquor, champagne and wine
When I begin to fall so low, I didn't have a friend and no place to go
So if I ever get my hand on a dollar again, I'm gonna hold on to it 'til them eagles grin
Nobody knows you, when you down and out
In my pocket not one penny, and my friends I haven't any

The song is a moderate-tempo blues with ragtime-influences, which follows an eight-bar progression:

| I – III^{7} | VI^{7} | ii – VI^{7} | ii | IV^{7} – ♯iv^{o}^{7} | I – VI^{7} | II^{7} | V^{7} |

== Early recordings ==
Although "Nobody Knows You When You Are Down and Out" was copyrighted in 1923, the first known publication did not appear until a recording of 1927. Blues and jazz musician Bobby Leecan, who recorded with various ensembles such as the South Street Trio, Dixie Jazzers Washboard Band, and Fats Waller's Six Hot Babies, recorded "Nobody Needs You When You're Down and Out" under the name "Blind Bobby Baker and his guitar", with his vocal and guitar. His version, recorded in New York around June 1927, is credited on the record label to Bobby Leecan and has completely different lyrics from the popular 1929 version, with emphasis on being poor, including a verse about being cheated playing "The Numbers".

The second known recording of the song was on January 11, 1929, by an obscure vocal quartet, the Aunt Jemima Novelty Four, first to use the now-familiar title, "Nobody Knows You When You're Down and Out".

Four days later, influential boogie-woogie pianist Pinetop Smith recorded "Nobody Knows You When You're Down and Out" in Chicago, crediting himself as the author. In it, lyrics (again quite different from either Bobby Leecan's or Bessie Smith's) are spoken rather than sung, by Pinetop Smith and Alberta Reynolds, to Pinetop's piano accompaniment. The song is one of eleven known recordings by Pinetop Smith, who died two months after the recording the song.

== Bessie Smith song ==
Bessie Smith recorded the song on May 15, 1929, in New York City. She recorded the song with instrumental accompaniment, including a small trumpet section. When Smith's record was released on Friday, September 13, 1929, the lyrics turned out to be oddly prophetic. The New York stock market had reached an all-time high less than two weeks earlier, only to go into its biggest decline two weeks later in the Wall Street Crash of 1929, which signaled the beginning of the ten-year Great Depression.

Bessie Smith's "Nobody Knows You When You're Down and Out" became one of her biggest hits, but was released before "race records" were tracked by record industry publications, such as Billboard magazine. Today, it "more than any other, is the song that most people associate with Bessie Smith".

== 1940s–1960s renditions ==
The song was so identified with Bessie Smith that no one recorded the song again until a generation later. It became a blues standard that "forced the crowds of her [Smith's] female imitators to try (in vain) to equal her through the following decades". In the late 1950s and early 1960s, it became popular during the American folk music revival; a version by Nina Simone reached number 23 in the Billboard R&B chart as well as number 93 in the Hot 100 pop chart in 1960.

== Eric Clapton versions ==
When he was an art student in the early 1960s, Eric Clapton was attracted to London's folk music scene and the fingerpicking acoustic guitar-style of Big Bill Broonzy. Along with "Key to the Highway", "Nobody Knows You When You're Down and Out" was one of the first songs that Clapton learned to play in this style. In 1970, he recorded a group version with his band, Derek and the Dominos, for their debut album Layla and Other Assorted Love Songs. The recording took place at the Criteria Studios in Miami, Florida, with Jim Gordon (drums), Carl Radle (bass), Bobby Whitlock (organ), Albhy Galuten (piano), and Duane Allman (slide guitar). As Whitlock recalled, Sam Samudio, who was also recording at Criteria, suggested that they record the song.

This was Duane Allman's first song with us. I believe that it was a song that he and Eric both had in common ... This song was recorded live, vocals and all, with no overdubs. It was the first take, but of course it was all worked out before we went into it.

Allman had recorded "Nobody Knows You When You're Down and Out" earlier with his brother Gregg Allman and used similar guitar lines for the Derek and the Dominos recording. Whitlock also noted that Clapton played through a Fender Champ guitar amplifier (a five-watt practice amp), while Allman used a Fender Twin.

Shortly after the studio recording, the song became part of the Dominos live set. Although it did not appear on their 1973 In Concert album, a recording from the Fillmore East on October 24, 1970 was later included on the expanded Live at the Fillmore album released in 1994. For this version, Clapton played all the guitar parts and Whitlock performed on piano. In 1992, Clapton recorded another rendition for the MTV Unplugged series. In keeping with the show's theme, the song was performed in an acoustic style. Clapton recounted: "I also enjoyed going back and playing the old stuff like 'Nobody Knows You When You're Down and Out', which was how it all started back in Kingston [University] so long ago."
