= Bell Bottom Blues (Derek and the Dominos song) =

1971 single by Derek and the Dominos

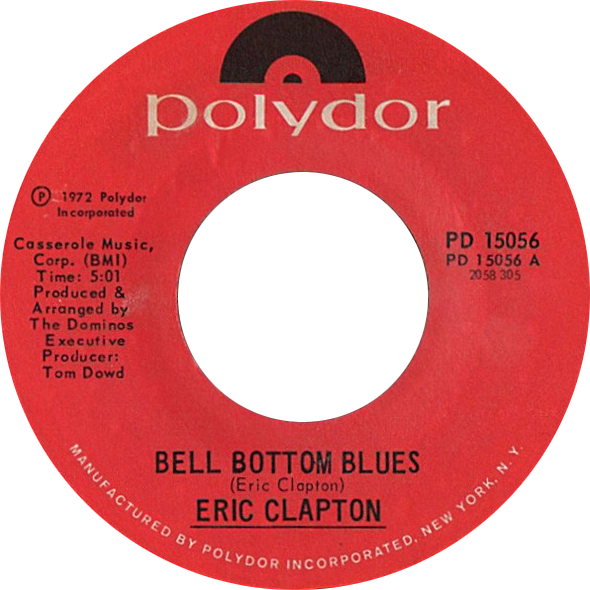
- One of side-A labels of the 1972 US single

Single by Derek and the Dominos

from the album Layla and Other Assorted Love Songs
- Released: 29 January 1971
- Recorded: 2 September 1970, Criteria Studios, Miami
- Genre: Blues rock; soul
- Length: 5:01; 3:10 (single version)
- Label: Polydor (UK), Atco (USA)
- Songwriters: Eric Clapton; Bobby Whitlock
- Producer: Tom Dowd

Derek and the Dominos singles chronology
"Tell the Truth" (1970)	"Bell Bottom Blues" (1971)	"Layla" (1971)

"Bell Bottom Blues" is a song written by Eric Clapton and Bobby Whitlock, and performed by Derek and the Dominos. It dealt with Clapton's unrequited love for Pattie Boyd, the wife of his friend George Harrison, and appeared on the 1970 double album Layla and Other Assorted Love Songs. Issued as a single, backed with "Keep on Growing", the song reached number 91 on the Billboard Hot 100 in 1971. A re-release backed with "Little Wing" peaked at number 78 on the same chart.

== Background and recording ==
"Bell Bottom Blues" was recorded before Duane Allman joined the recording sessions for the Layla album, so Clapton was the only guitarist on the song. Clapton compensated for this by playing multiple guitar parts, including a sensitive, George Harrison-style guitar solo and chime-like harmonics. The other musicians on the recording were Bobby Whitlock on Hammond organ, Carl Radle on bass and percussion, and Jim Gordon on drums, including tabla and backwards snare. Whitlock also sang occasional harmony vocals.

== Composition ==
Bell-bottoms are a style of trousers that were popular at the time. According to Clapton, the song was written for Pattie Boyd after she asked him to get her a pair of bell-bottom blue jeans from the United States. Clapton wrote the song for her, along with many others on the album such as "I Looked Away" and "Layla". The lyrics described a lovers' quarrel. Bill Janovitz of AllMusic noted the raw anguish in Clapton's voice in the pre-chorus and chorus:

Do you wanna see me crawl across the floor to you?
Do you wanna hear me beg you to take me back?
I'd gladly do it because I don't wanna fade away
Give me one more day, please
I don't wanna fade away
In your heart I wanna stay

contrasted with the somber longing expressed in Clapton's voice in the verses:

Bell bottom blues
You made me cry
I don't wanna lose this feeling
If I could choose a place to die
It would be in your arms.

Author Jan Reid also praised Clapton's singing on the song, noting that his phrasing managed to suggest that despite the pain he is feeling, the woman's antics remind him of the "joy of just being alive".

In their song "Soul Survivor," from the album Exile on Main St., released in 1972, the Rolling Stones sing, "I got the bell-bottom blues."

== Songwriting credit ==
The writing of the song was originally credited to Eric Clapton alone, but is now jointly credited to Clapton and Bobby Whitlock. Whitlock stated in an interview in 2011 that "Eric started the song ... He played me the first two verses at his house and I helped with the last verse", and that it was credited to Clapton alone by a "clerical error". In 2015, in an interview by Mike Rossi for Facio Create, Whitlock stated that Clapton had now formally accepted that Whitlock had contributed, and in future the song would be jointly credited. The BMI website now credits both writers.

== Reception ==
In a review upon the album's release, Rolling Stone writer Ed Leimacher called "Bell Bottom Blues" (as well as "Have You Ever Loved a Woman") filler. Cash Box described the song as "a progressive ballad that should see powerful top forty reception" and as being "instrumentally enticing and surprisingly melodic." Record World said it was "soulful and subtle, not unlike George Harrison's latest." Billboard said "Eric Clapton's rocking blues ballad, served up in an emotion packed vocal workout is a winner headed for a high Hot 100 spot. A retrospective of the album in Rolling Stone praised the song as an epic that "feels as if it's going to shatter from the heat of its romantic agony". AllMusic critic Bill Janovitz admired both Clapton's guitar playing and his anguished vocal performance. In The New Rolling Stone Album Guide, J. D. Considine cited the track as an example of how Layla and Other Assorted Love Songs is "about the transformation of the blues, a process Clapton and his bandmates manage through a variety of means", adding that the song "distills the pop-blues approach of Blind Faith and Cream into a memorable chorus and exquisite metaphor".

== Adaptations ==
Cher recorded "Bell Bottom Blues" on her 1975 album, Stars. Matthew Sweet and Susanna Hoffs covered the song on their 2009 album, Under the Covers, Vol. 2. Bruce Springsteen borrowed the line "I don't wanna fade away" from "Bell Bottom Blues", for his 1980 song "Fade Away". Lady Gaga referenced the title in her song "Dope", where she sang "I'm sorry and I love you, sing with me, 'Bell Bottom Blue'."
