= Layla =

1970 song written by Eric Clapton and Jim Gordon

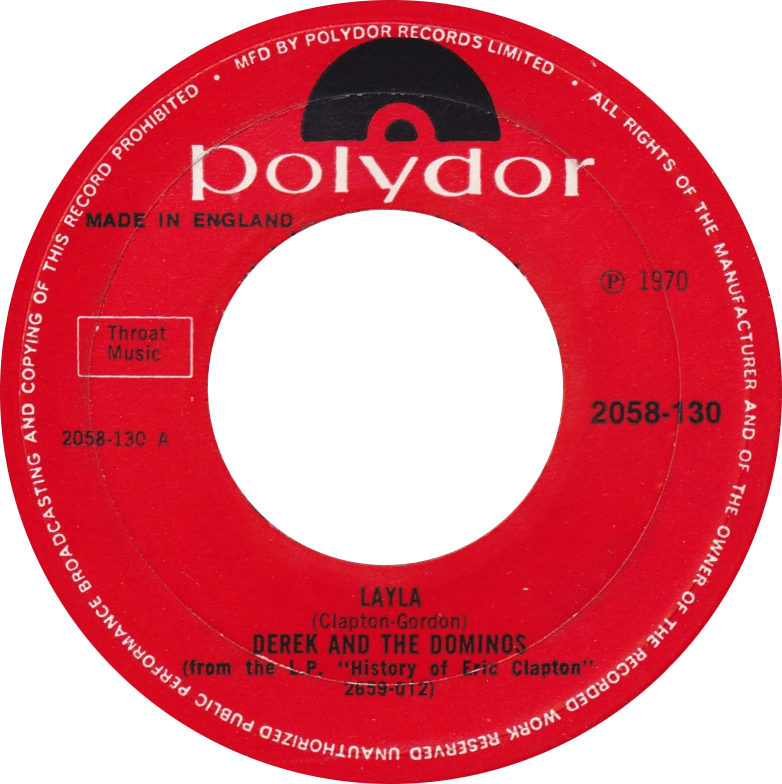
- Side A of the 1972 UK single release

Single by Derek and the Dominos

from the album Layla and Other Assorted Love Songs
- B-side: "I Am Yours"
- Released: 12 March 1971
- Recorded: 9 September 1970
- Studio: Criteria, Miami
- Genre: Rock, blues rock
- Length: 7:04 (album version & re-release version); 2:43 (single version)
- Label: Atco (US); RSO; Polydor
- Songwriters: Eric Clapton; Jim Gordon
- Producers: Tom Dowd; Derek and the Dominos

Derek and the Dominos singles chronology
"Bell Bottom Blues" (1970)	"Layla" (1971)	"Why Does Love Got to Be So Sad" (1973)

Audio
- "Layla" by Derek and the Dominos on YouTube

"Layla" is a song written by Eric Clapton and Jim Gordon, originally recorded with their band Derek and the Dominos, as the thirteenth track from their only studio album, Layla and Other Assorted Love Songs (1970). Its contrasting movements were composed separately by Clapton and Gordon. The piano part has also been controversially credited to Rita Coolidge, Gordon's girlfriend at the time.

The song was inspired by a love story that originated in 7th-century Persian literature and later formed the basis of the poem The Story of Layla and Majnun by the 12th-century Persian author Nizami Ganjavi, a copy of which Abdalqadir as-Sufi had given to Clapton. The book moved Clapton profoundly because its story mirrored Clapton's own—a young man's obsessive love for a beautiful girl driving him to madness. At the time, Clapton was desperately in love with Pattie Boyd, the wife of his friend and fellow musician, George Harrison. After Harrison and Boyd divorced, Clapton and Boyd eventually married.

"Layla" is often hailed as being among the greatest rock songs of all time. Two versions have achieved chart success, the first in 1972 and the second 20 years later as an acoustic Unplugged performance by Clapton. In 2004, "Layla" was ranked number 27 on Rolling Stone's list of "The 500 Greatest Songs of All Time", and the acoustic version won the 1993 Grammy Award for Best Rock Song.

== Background ==
In 1966, Beatles guitarist George Harrison married Pattie Boyd, a model he met two years before during the filming of A Hard Day's Night. During the late 1960s, Clapton and Harrison became close friends. Clapton contributed uncredited (although openly acknowledged) guitar work on Harrison's song "While My Guitar Gently Weeps" on the Beatles' self-titled double album (also known as the White Album), and Harrison co-wrote and played guitar on Cream's "Badge" from Goodbye. Between his tenures in Cream and Blind Faith, Clapton fell in love with Boyd.

The title of "Layla" was inspired by the story of Layla and Majnun, which Clapton had been told by his friend Ian Dallas, who was converting to Islam. Nizami's tale, about a moon princess who was married off by her father to a man she did not love, resulting in Majnun's madness, struck a deep chord with Clapton.

Boyd divorced Harrison in 1977 and married Clapton in 1979 during a concert stop in Tucson, Arizona. Harrison was not bitter about the divorce and attended Clapton's wedding party with his former band mates Ringo Starr and Paul McCartney. During their relationship, Clapton wrote another love ballad for Boyd, "Wonderful Tonight" (1977). Clapton and Boyd divorced in 1989.

== Writing and recording ==
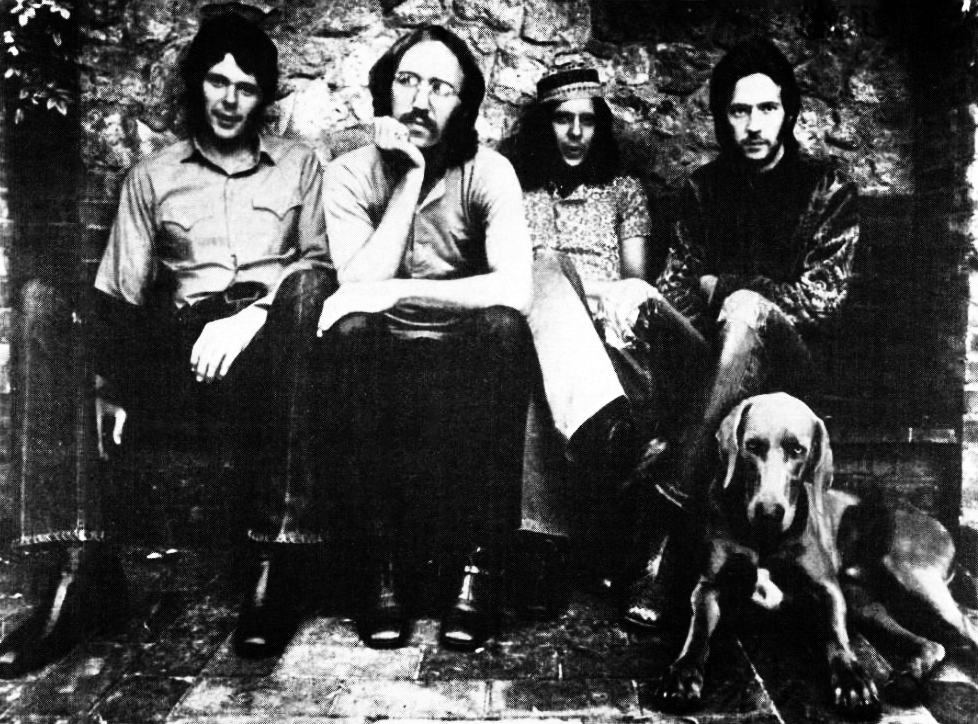
Derek and the Dominos in February 1971

After the break-up of Cream, Clapton appeared with several groups, including Blind Faith and the husband-and-wife duo Delaney & Bonnie. In the spring of 1970, he was told that some members of Delaney & Bonnie's back-up band, including bassist Carl Radle, drummer Jim Gordon and keyboardist Bobby Whitlock, were leaving the group. Seizing the opportunity, Clapton formed a new group with Whitlock, Radle and Gordon. Naming themselves Derek and the Dominos, the band "made our bones", according to Clapton, while backing Harrison on his first post-Beatles solo album, All Things Must Pass.

During the recording of the Layla album, Duane Allman joined the fledgling band as a guest of Clapton. Clapton and Allman, already mutual fans, were introduced by veteran recording engineer and producer Tom Dowd at an Allman Brothers concert at the Miami Beach Convention Center on 26 August 1970. The two hit it off well and soon became good friends. Dowd said of their guitar-playing chemistry: "There had to be some sort of telepathy going on because I've never seen spontaneous inspiration happen at that rate and level. One of them would play something, and the other reacted instantaneously. Never once did either of them have to say, 'Could you play that again, please?' It was like two hands in a glove. And they got tremendously off on playing with each other." Dowd was already famous for a variety of achievements and had worked with Clapton in his Cream days (Clapton once called him "the ideal recording man"); his production on the album would be another milestone.

Clapton originally wrote "Layla" as a ballad, with lyrics describing his unrequited love for Boyd, but the song became a "rocker" when, according to Clapton, Allman composed the song's signature riff. With the band assembled and Dowd producing, "Layla" was recorded in its rock form. The recording of the first section consisted of sixteen tracks of which six were guitar tracks: a rhythm part by Clapton, three tracks of harmonies played by Clapton (the main power chord riff on both channels and two harmonies against that main riff, one on the left channel and one on the right channel), a track of solos by Allman (fretted solos with bent notes during the verses and a slide solo during the outro), and one track with both Allman and Clapton playing duplicate solos (the 7-note "signature" riff doubled in two octaves and the 12-note "signature" riff doubled in unison). According to Clapton, Allman played the first seven notes of the 12-note "signature" riff fretted and the last five notes on slide in standard tuning. Each player used one input of the same two-input Fender Champ amplifier.

Shortly afterwards, Clapton returned to the studio, where he heard Jim Gordon playing a piano piece he had composed separately. Impressed by the piece, Clapton convinced Gordon to allow it to be used as part of the song. Though only Gordon has been credited with this part, according to Whitlock, "Jim took that piano melody from his ex-girlfriend Rita Coolidge. I know because in the D&B days I lived in John Garfield's old house in the Hollywood Hills and there was a guest house with an upright piano in it. Rita and Jim were up there in the guest house and invited me to join in on writing this song with them called 'Time' ... Her sister Priscilla wound up recording it with Booker T. Jones ... Jim took the melody from Rita's song and didn't give her credit for writing it. Her boyfriend ripped her off." "Time" ended up on the 1973 album Chronicles by Booker T. and Priscilla Jones. Whitlock's story was echoed by Coolidge herself in her 2016 autobiography. The claim is also repeated in Graham Nash's 2014 autobiography Wild Tales.

"Layla"'s second movement (the "Piano Exit") was recorded roughly a week after the first, with Gordon playing his piano part, Clapton playing acoustic guitar and slide guitar, and Allman playing electric and bottleneck slide guitar. After Dowd spliced the two movements together, "Layla" was complete.

The opening five bars to the guitar part of "Layla"

Due to the circumstances of its composition, "Layla" is defined by two movements, each marked by a riff. The first movement, which was recorded in the key of D minor for choruses and C-sharp minor for verses, is centred on the "signature riff", a guitar piece using hammer-ons, pull-offs and power chords. The first section contains the overdub-heavy slide guitar solo, played by Allman. By placing his slide at points beyond the end of the fretboard, Allman was able to play notes at a higher pitch than could be played with standard technique. Dowd referred to this as "notes that aren't on the instrument."

The second movement is commonly referred to as the "Piano Exit". Originally played in C major, the tape speed of the coda was increased slightly during mixing. The resulting pitch is somewhere between C and C sharp. The piano interlude at the end of the song is augmented by an acoustic guitar, and is also the accompaniment to the outro-solo. The same melody is also played on Allman's slide guitar an octave higher. Gordon does not improvise or deviate from the piano part; Clapton and Allman are the ones who improvise the melody. The song ends with Allman playing his signature high-pitched "bird call" on his slide guitar.

Clapton commented on the song:

"Layla" is a difficult one, because it's a difficult song to perform live. You have to have a good complement of musicians to get all of the ingredients going, but when you've got that ... It's difficult to do as a quartet, for instance, because there are some parts you have to play and sing completely opposing lines, which is almost impossible to do. If you've got a big band, which I will have on the tour, then it will be easy to do something like "Layla" – and I'm very proud of it. I love to hear it. It's almost like it's not me. It's like I'm listening to someone that I really like. Derek and The Dominos was a band I really liked – and it's almost like I wasn't in that band. It's just a band that I'm a fan of. Sometimes, my own music can be like that. When it's served its purpose to being good music, I don't associate myself with it any more. It's like someone else. It's easy to do those songs then.

Pattie Boyd later reflected: "I think that he was amazingly raw at the time ... He's such an incredible musician that he's able to put his emotions into music in such a way that the audience can feel it instinctively. It goes right through you."

== Personnel ==
Derek and the Dominos

- Eric Clapton – guitars, lead vocals
- Duane Allman – slide guitar
- Bobby Whitlock – Hammond organ, harmony vocals
- Jim Gordon – drums, percussion, piano
- Carl Radle – bass guitar

Production

- Tom Dowd – producer
- Ron Albert, Howard Albert, Mack Emerman, Chuck Kirkpatrick, Karl Richardson – recording engineers

== Beyond the original album ==
Layla and Other Assorted Love Songs opened to lacklustre sales as the Derek and the Dominos album never actually reached the music charts in the United Kingdom, possibly in part because Clapton's name was found only on the back cover. In addition, the song's length proved prohibitive for radio airplay. As a result, a shortened version of the song, consisting of the first 2:43 of Part I, was released as a single in March 1971 by Atco Records in the United States. The version peaked at number 51 on the Billboard Hot 100 singles chart. When "Layla" was re-released on the 1972 compilations The History of Eric Clapton and Duane Allman's An Anthology and then released the full 7:10 version (including the "Piano Exit" that formed Part II) as a single, it charted at number seven in the United Kingdom and reached number 10 in the United States. With good sales figures, Billboard magazine ranked the single as the 60th best-selling song in 1972.

In 1982, "Layla" was re-released as a single in the United Kingdom, and peaked at number four. This time the whole seven-minute single charted, containing the trailing two-thirds which is instrumental only. Critical opinion since has been overwhelmingly positive. Dave Marsh, in The Rolling Stone Illustrated History of Rock and Roll, wrote that "there are few moments in the repertoire of recorded rock where a singer or writer has reached so deeply into himself that the effect of hearing them is akin to witnessing a murder or a suicide... to me 'Layla' is the greatest of them." Marsh listed "Layla" at number 156 in his The Heart of Rock & Soul: The 1001 Greatest Singles Ever Made.

In May 1980, "Layla" was covered by the London Symphony Orchestra, but without the lyrics, being recorded at EMI Studio One, Abbey Road, London. A similar version has been performed by the Royal Philharmonic Orchestra. On 20 September 1983, a benefit show called the ARMS Charity Concert for Multiple Sclerosis at the Royal Albert Hall in London featured a jam with Eric Clapton, Jeff Beck, and Jimmy Page performing "Layla". Clapton, Beck, and Page were the Yardbirds' successive lead guitarists from 1963 to 1968.

In 2003, the Allman Brothers Band began playing the song in concert. Warren Haynes sang the vocal, Gregg Allman played the piano part, and Derek Trucks played Duane Allman's guitar parts during the coda. The performances were seen as a tribute not only to Allman, but also to producer Tom Dowd, who had died the previous year. Eric Clapton recorded yet a third version. "Layla" appears as track seven on Play the Blues: Live from Jazz at Lincoln Center. Personnel on this version include Wynton Marsalis (vocals, trumpet), Eric Clapton (vocals, guitar), Victor Goines (clarinet), Marcus Printup (trumpet), Chris Crenshaw (trombone, vocals), Don Vappie (banjo), Chris Stainton (keyboards), Dan Nimmer (piano), Carlos Henriquez (bass), and Ali Jackson (drums).

== Charts ==
=== Weekly charts ===
Chart (1971)	Peak position
Australia (Kent Music Report)	100
Japanese Singles Chart	8
Netherlands 40 Singles Chart	9
Polish Singles Chart	3
US Billboard Hot 100	51
US Cash Box Singles	52

Chart (1972)	Peak position
Canadian RPM 100 Singles	9
Irish Singles Chart	10
Netherlands 40 Singles Chart	12
New Zealand Singles Chart	2
Puerto Rican Singles Chart	1
UK Singles Chart	7
US Billboard Hot 100	10
US Cash Box Singles	14
US Record World Singles	12

Chart (1982)	Peak position
Irish Singles Chart	4
Japanese Singles Chart	9
UK Singles Chart	4

Chart (2007)	Peak position
Japanese Singles Chart	189
UK Singles Chart	113

=== Year-end charts ===
Chart (1971)	Position
Japanese Singles Chart	75

Chart (1972)	Position
New Zealand Singles Chart	51
US Billboard Hot 100	60

Chart (1982)	Position
Japanese Singles Chart	32

== Certifications ==
Region	Certification	Certified units/sales
Italy (FIMI)	Gold	50,000^{‡}
New Zealand (RMNZ)	2× Platinum	60,000^{‡}
Spain (Promusicae)	Gold	30,000^{‡}
United Kingdom (BPI)	Platinum	600,000^{‡}
^{‡} Sales+streaming figures based on certification alone.

== Unplugged version ==
"Layla" (acoustic)

Single by Eric Clapton

from the album Unplugged
- B-side: "Tears in Heaven" (acoustic)
- Released: 21 September 1992
- Recorded: 16 January 1992
- Genre: Acoustic rock
- Length: 4:46
- Label: Reprise
- Songwriters: Eric Clapton; Jim Gordon
- Producer: Russ Titelman

Eric Clapton singles chronology
"Tears in Heaven" (1992)	"Layla" (acoustic) (1992)	"Down & Out" (1992)

Music video
- "Layla" (1992 unplugged live) by Eric Clapton on YouTube

Audio sample
- file; help

=== Recording ===
In 1992, Clapton was invited to play for the MTV Unplugged series. On 16 January 1992, he recorded an acoustic album, accompanied by a concert film, at the Bray Studios in Bray, Berkshire. Although the production team and Clapton's staff liked the recordings, Clapton did not want to release either the album or the concert film. Finally, Clapton agreed to release the album in a limited edition. When Unplugged sold out, Clapton gave Warner Bros. and Reprise Records the permission to delete the limited album production. For the album, Clapton decided to record both new material like "Lonely Stranger" and old songs he grew up with such as "Nobody Knows You When You're Down and Out" or enjoyed listening to or had written as an adult, like "San Francisco Bay Blues" and "Layla". Clapton, who plays acoustic guitar and sings on the live track, was backed by Andy Fairweather Low who played acoustic rhythm guitar, Nathan East on acoustic bass guitar and background vocals, Ray Cooper on percussion, Steve Ferrone on drums, Katie Kissoon and Tessa Niles on background vocals as well as Chuck Leavell on piano. Pianist Chuck Leavell recalled that recording the acoustic version of "Layla" felt natural to him and liked that the band was given some space to play during the body of the song and not just during the reprise like it is on the original recording. "It gave us a chance to interpret the song in our way and it did work out well and it gave it a rebirth I think", Leavell said. The acoustic version of "Layla" was produced by Russ Titelman.

Clapton recorded the acoustic version of "Layla" on a C. F. Martin & Company steel-string acoustic guitar in OOO-42 style from 1939 which was hand built in Nazareth, Pennsylvania (No. OOO-42/73234). Clapton called this guitar one of the finest instruments he has ever used and called its sound "incredible". The auction house Christie's noted, "the guitar became one of the most enduring images of recent music history" being a part of the Unplugged album cover. Christie's expert for the musical department Kerry Keane called the instrument "in the hands of Eric Clapton singly responsible for the repopularization of playing acoustic guitar today". When Keane played the guitar, he also remarked an "amazing" sound as the acoustic guitar seems to have a "wonderfully balanced tone [which is] loud and sweet at the same time with an incredible bass note." The vintage instrument was estimated to sell for between $60,000 and $80,000 but was in the end sold for $791,500.

=== Arrangement ===
Rhythm acoustic guitar player Andy Fairweather Low was invited by Clapton to his flat in Chelsea, London, to work out the songs to be recorded for the Unplugged album in January 1992. During the process, Clapton suggested that it would be a good idea to do another version of "Layla". Fairweather Low agreed because he had wanted to release one himself as a big Derek and the Dominos fan. Clapton thought that the perfect arrangement for the rock anthem would be a shuffle because he always liked changing the tempo of a song and looking at something from a different angle.

When Clapton was asked about the acoustic version of the song by the MTV Network, he replied: "'Layla' sort of mystified me. I have done it the same all these years and never ever considered trying to revamp it. And a lot of artists do that, you know? Bob Dylan for instance changes everything everytime he plays it and I thought this was another great opportunity to just take it off on a different path, to put it to a shuffle and for a start, making it acoustic denied all the riffs, really. They would have sounded a bit weak, I think, on the acoustic guitar, so it just seemed to become Jazzier somehow. And of course, I'm singing it a whole octave down. So it gives it a nice kind of atmosphere."

The song was written in the key of D minor which Clapton recalled pushed him to the top of his singing range. When Clapton slowed it down, Fairweather Low suggested Clapton should sing the track a whole octave down. Clapton was pleased with the result as it sounded "nice" and "sort of Jazzy" to him. The new arrangement slowed down and reworked the original riff and dispensed with the piano coda. Because Clapton changed the arrangement so much, he decided to introduce this version to the unsuspecting live audience by stating: "See if you can spot this one."

=== Reception ===
AllMusic critic Stephen Thomas Erlewine said that "Layla" seemed to be the Unplugged album's hit; he describes it as a "slow crawl through Derek & the Dominos' version, turning that anguished howl of pain into a cozy shuffle and the whole album proceeds at a similar amiable gait, taking its time and enjoying detours into old blues standards." Journalist Steve Hochman called the acoustic version a "low-key but seductive recasting". Music broadcaster VH1 thinks the Unplugged version revealed Clapton's guitar skills in the acoustic setting, which was particularly obvious on the reworking of "Layla" that "stressed Clapton's tender side without forfeitting intensity". Entertainment Weekly journalists picked the tune as the mega hit off the Unplugged album. The critics especially liked Leavell's piano work on the song, saying that it "adds a smoky-jazz-joint torch-song ambience that's both expectation shattering and emotionally compelling to the tune".

=== Charts ===
==== Weekly charts ====
Chart (1992–1993)	Peak position
Australian Singles Chart	7
Belgium Flanders 30 Singles Chart	22
Belgium Flanders 50 Singles Chart	19
Canadian Adult Contemporary	4
Canadian Singles Chart	1
German Singles Chart	35
Icelandic Singles Chart	5
Irish Singles Chart	20
Italian Singles Chart	8
Japanese Singles Chart	1
Netherlands 100 Singles Chart	8
Netherlands 40 Singles Chart	4
New Zealand Singles Chart	3
Swiss Singles Chart	28
UK Singles Chart	45
UK Airplay (Music Week)	34
US Billboard Hot 100	12
US Adult Contemporary (Billboard)	8
US Mainstream Rock Airplay (Billboard)	9
US Pop Airplay (Billboard)	4
US Radio Songs (Billboard)	12
US Cash Box Top 100	7

==== Year-end charts ====
Chart (1992)	Position
Australian Singles Chart	28
Belgium Flanders 50 Singles Chart	102
Canadian Singles Chart	5
Canadian Adult Contemporary	27
German Singles Chart	196
Japanese Singles Chart	25
Netherlands 100 Singles Chart	40
Netherlands 40 Singles Chart	40
New Zealand Singles Chart	52
Swiss Singles Chart	144
US Billboard Hot 100	88
US Billboard Radio Airplay	83

Chart (1993)	Position
Icelandic Singles Chart	52

=== Certifications ===
Region	Certification	Certified units/sales
Australia (ARIA)	Gold	35,000^{^}
Denmark (IFPI Danmark)	Gold	45,000^{‡}
Japan (RIAJ)	Gold	
New Zealand (RMNZ)	2× Platinum	60,000^{‡}
United Kingdom (BPI)	Silver	200,000^{‡}
United States (RIAA)	—	230,000
^{^} Shipments figures based on certification alone.^{‡} Sales+streaming figures based on certification alone.

== Critical reception and legacy ==
In 1972, "Layla" was one of the most performed songs of the year, and was already considered a "rock standard". With its re-release in 1982, the song was again praised. It is featured on a number of "greatest ever" lists. The song was chosen by the Rock and Roll Hall of Fame as one of its "500 Songs that Shaped Rock and Roll", and Rolling Stone ranked the song at number 27 on their 2004 list of "The 500 Greatest Songs of All Time". The Recording Industry Association of America ranked "Layla" at number 118 on their Songs of the Century on 7 March 2001. Music critic Dave Marsh placed the tune at number two in his "Best Singles of the Year 1972" compilation.

With its reworking in 1992 for the Unplugged album, "Layla" became an all-time hit song, as it won the Grammy Award for Best Rock Song in 1993, and was broadcast nonstop in 1992 and 1993 on the radio, in stores, and on television around the globe. In 1992, "Layla" was the most performed song of the year, and won a BMI Broadcasting Award for radio and television appearances of the 1992 "Layla" for more than two million times in summer of 1994. As of 2016, "Layla" had attained more than eight million broadcasts on television and the radio or performances on other records and during live concerts.

"Layla" was used in Goodfellas during the scene portraying the aftermath of the 1978 Lufthansa heist. Director Martin Scorsese planned out the sequence with the song specifically in mind, playing it on set to synchronise with the staging and camera movement. The song also plays during the film's ending credits, after a cover of "My Way" by Sid Vicious.

American record producer DJ Khaled sampled the Derek and the Dominos' arrangement of "Layla" in his 2021 song "I Did It" featuring American rappers Post Malone, Megan Thee Stallion, Lil Baby and DaBaby.
