= Chuck Willis =

American R&B singer-songwriter (1926–1958)

Background information
- Born: Harold Willis; January 31, 1926; Atlanta, Georgia, U.S.
- Died: April 10, 1958 (aged 32) Chicago, Illinois, U.S.
- Genres: Rhythm and blues; blues; rock and roll
- Occupations: Singer, songwriter
- Years active: 1949–1958
- Labels: OKeh; Atlantic

Harold "Chuck" Willis (January 31, 1926 – April 10, 1958) was an American blues, rhythm and blues, and rock and roll singer and songwriter. His biggest hits, "C. C. Rider" (1957) and "What Am I Living For" (1958), both reached No. 1 on the Billboard R&B chart. He was known as 'The King of the Stroll' for his performance of the 1950s dance, the Stroll.

== Life and career ==
Willis was born in Atlanta, Georgia, in 1926. He was spotted at a talent contest by Atlanta radio disc jockey Zenas Sears, who became his manager and helped him to sign with Columbia Records in 1951. After one single, Willis began recording on a Columbia subsidiary, Okeh. During his stay at Okeh, he established himself as a popular R&B singer and songwriter, performing material that he wrote himself. In 1956, he moved to Atlantic Records where he had immediate success with "It's Too Late", "Juanita" and "Love Me Cherry".

His most successful recording was "C.C. Rider", which topped the US Billboard R&B chart in 1957 and also crossed over and sold well in the pop market. Jerry Wexler said it was Willis's surprising idea to "do an old standard" instead of one of his own songs. "C.C. Rider" was a remake of a twelve-bar blues, performed by Ma Rainey in Atlanta before Willis was born. Its relaxed beat, combined with a mellow vibraphone backing and chorus, inspired the emergence of the popular dance, the Stroll. When performing on stage Willis and his group would do this step side to side. Dick Clark played "C. C. Rider" on American Bandstand, and "The Stroll" became a popular dance. Willis's follow-up was "Betty and Dupree", another "stroll" song and a similar "old standard", which also did well. Wexler said that Dick Clark used "Betty and Dupree" on American Bandstand to accompany "The Stroll," and that is how Willis became known as "King of The Stroll." Willis' single "Going to the River", a song by Dave Bartholomew and Fats Domino, was a prototype for his "stroll" sound, reaching No.4 on the R&B chart.

Willis performed wearing a turban (a gimmick suggested to him by his friend Screamin' Jay Hawkins) and was also known as the "Sheik of Shake." In the early 1950s he hosted and performed on a weekly Saturday night television show in Atlanta, which featured guest artists such as Ray Charles and Sam Cooke who were passing through town. Zenas Sears said that Willis was a better songwriter than a performer, but also said, "On the TV show ... Chuck would do five or six different numbers every week. He moved very well, he handled himself very well and put everyone at ease." He was a solid, if not spectacular, performer on the road as well, and "was one of the few artists who would treat a band properly," according to Roy Gaines, who was Willis's bandleader and guitarist.

== Songwriting ==
Willis approached songwriting with painstaking craftsmanship and the result was literate, soulful and melancholy. He did not introduce a song in the studio until it was a polished product and fully worked out in his mind. He used a variety of methods. Zenas Sears said Willis would drive around in the car singing into a reel-to-reel tape recorder. Sears said, "If he'd lived he would have been recognized for that [his songwriting]." Roy Gaines recalled, "He'd lock up in a hotel room and wouldn't see anyone for 3-4 days or a week. When he wrote 'It's Too Late,' he was in his room for a week."

Ruth Brown, who toured with Willis, said he would write on yellow legal pads. Brown said, "I asked him, because he had such a good song going, I said, 'Chuck, why don't you write me a tune? And he did. He wrote, "Oh What a Dream".'" Jerry Wexler said Willis would bring a full set of lyrics into the studio and then work out the arrangements with the band. Zenas Sears said, "[N]o one helped him with his songs. He always wrote a great deal."

== Death ==
Willis had suffered from stomach ulcers for many years. He was known to drink a lot. During surgery in Chicago, Willis died of peritonitis on April 10, 1958, at the age of 32.

His death occurred while at the peak of his career, just after the release of his last single, "What Am I Living For", backed by "Hang Up My Rock and Roll Shoes". "Hang Up My Rock & Roll Shoes" was actually the A-side of the single but, upon his death, "What Am I Living For" became the more popular of the two songs. "What Am I Living For" sold over one million copies, and was awarded a gold disc. It was also the top R&B disc of 1958. This was the first rock and roll record released in stereo, "engineered by Tom Dowd of Atlantic Records".

When Willis died, he owed a lot of money to the US government, because, according to Zenas Sears, "he paid the band out of his own pocket without ever deducting taxes. ... When he died, his wife had the house, she had the fur coats and the Cadillac, but there was no money."

== Influence ==
An early Okeh hit, "Don't Deceive Me (Please Don't Go)" became his most widely covered song with versions by Ruth Brown, Little Richard, Screamin' Jay Hawkins, James Brown, and Delaney and Bonnie. It was also used as the title of an episode of "Grey's Anatomy" (Season 7, episode 13, 2011).

His hit, the blues ballad "It's Too Late" was covered by other artists, including Otis Redding, Roy Orbison, Buddy Holly and the Crickets, Ted Taylor (1969 single), Freddie King, Derek and the Dominos and the Jerry Garcia Band. In 2005, Redding's version was heavily sampled by Kanye West on Late Registration's "Gone".

Elvis Presley covered "I Feel So Bad" and "C. C. Rider" The Five Keys and Peaches and Herb had hits with "Close Your Eyes", and Ruth Brown and Conway Twitty had hits with "Oh What a Dream".

The Band covered "Hang Up My Rock and Roll Shoes" on their 1972 live album Rock of Ages.

Willis's cousin was Chick Willis.

== Discography ==
=== Singles ===
Year	Single (A-side, B-side) Both tracks from same album except where indicated	Label	Chart Positions		Album
Year	Single (A-side, B-side) Both tracks from same album except where indicated	Label	US Pop	US R&B	Album
1951	"It Ain't Right to Treat Me Wrong" b/w "Can't You See" (Non-album track)	Columbia 30238	–	–	My Story
1952	"Here I Come" b/w "Loud Mouth Lucy"	OKeh 6873	–	–	Non-album tracks
1952	"My Story" b/w "Caldonia"	OKeh 6905	–	2	Chuck Willis Wails the Blues
1952	"Wrong Lake to Catch a Fish" b/w "Salty Tears" (from My Story)	OKeh 6930	–	–	Non-album track
1953	"Going to the River" b/w "Baby Have Left Me Again" (Non-album track)	OKeh 6952	–	4	My Story
1953	"Don't Deceive Me" b/w "I've Been Treated Wrong Too Long" (Non-album track)	OKeh 6985	–	6	Chuck Willis Wails the Blues
1954	"You're Still My Baby" b/w "What's Your Name" (Non-album track)	OKeh 7015	–	4	Chuck Willis Wails the Blues
1954	"I Feel So Bad" b/w "Need One More Chance"	OKeh 7029	–	8	Chuck Willis Wails the Blues
1954	"Change My Mind" b/w "My Heart's Been Broke Again"	OKeh 7041	–	–	My Story
1954	"Give and Take" b/w "I've Been Away Too Long"	OKeh 7048	–	–	Non-album tracks
1955	"Lawdy Miss Mary" b/w "Love Struck"	OKeh 7051	–	–	Chuck Willis Wails the Blues
1955	"I Can Tell" b/w "One More Break"	OKeh 7055	–	–	Chuck Willis Wails the Blues
1955	"Search My Heart" b/w "Ring-Ding-Doo" (Non-album track)	OKeh 7062	–	–	Chuck Willis Wails the Blues
1956	"It's Too Late" b/w "Kansas City Woman"	Atlantic 1098	–	3	King of the Stroll
1956	"Juanita" /	Atlantic 1112	–	7	King of the Stroll
1956	"Whatcha' Gonna Do When Your Baby Leaves You"	Atlantic 1112	–	11	King of the Stroll
1956	"Come on Home" b/w "It Were You"	OKeh 7067	–	–	Non-album tracks
1956	"Charged with Cheating" b/w "Two Spoons of Tears" (from My Story)	OKeh 7070	–	–	Chuck Willis Wails the Blues
1957	"C. C. Rider" b/w "Ease the Pain"	Atlantic 1130	12	1	King of the Stroll
1957	"That Train Has Gone" b/w "Love Me Cherry"	Atlantic 1148	–	–	King of the Stroll
1958	"Betty and Dupree" b/w "My Crying Eyes"	Atlantic 1168	33	15	King of the Stroll
1958	"What Am I Living For" /	Atlantic 1179	9	1	I Remember Chuck Willis
1958	"Hang Up My Rock and Roll Shoes"	Atlantic 1179	24	9	I Remember Chuck Willis
1958	"My Life" b/w "Thunder and Lightning"	Atlantic 1192	46	12	King of the Stroll
1958	"Keep A-Driving" b/w "You'll Be My Love"	Atlantic 2005	–	19	I Remember Chuck Willis
1959	"Just One Kiss" b/w "My Baby"	Atlantic 2029	–	–	I Remember Chuck Willis

=== Albums ===
Year	Title	Label
1958	Wails the Blues	Epic LN 3425
1958	King of the Stroll	Atlantic 8018
1962	I Remember Chuck Willis	Atlantic 8079

=== Compilation albums ===
Year	Title	Label
1980	Chuck Willis -- My Story	CBS JC36389 (re-released by Sony on CD in 1990)
1994	Let's Jump Tonight -- The Best of Chuck Willis from 1951 -'56	Sony 53619
2001	I Remember Chuck Willis/King of the Stroll	Collectables COL-CD-6889
2006	C.C. Rider	Atlantic Collectables [sic] COL-CD-9973
