= Little Wing =

1967 song by Jimi Hendrix

Song by the Jimi Hendrix Experience

from the album Axis: Bold as Love
- Released: December 1, 1967 (UK); January 15, 1968 (US)
- Recorded: October 25 & 28, 1967 (Note: A third recording date, October 31, 1967, has also been suggested.)
- Studio: Olympic, London
- Genre: Rock (Note: "'Little Wing' is so sad yet so hopeful, a ballad not of any particular category, yet blending perfectly between lyric and melody".); psychedelic soul
- Length: 2:24
- Label: Track (UK); Reprise (US)
- Songwriter: Jimi Hendrix
- Producer: Chas Chandler

"Little Wing" is a song written by Jimi Hendrix and recorded by the Jimi Hendrix Experience in 1967. It is a slow tempo rhythm and blues-inspired ballad featuring Hendrix's vocal and guitar with recording studio effects accompanied by bass, drums, and glockenspiel. Lyrically, it is one of several of his songs that reference an idealized feminine or guardian angel-like figure. At about two and a half minutes in length, it is one of his most concise and melodically focused pieces.

The origins of "Little Wing" have been traced back to the 1966 recording of "(My Girl) She's a Fox", an R&B song which features Hendrix playing Curtis Mayfield-influenced guitar accompaniment. He developed the song while performing in New York City's Greenwich Village prior to his involvement with producer Chas Chandler. After being inspired by events at the 1967 Monterey Pop Festival, Hendrix completed the song in October 1967, when it was recorded by the Experience during the sessions for their second album Axis: Bold as Love.

"Little Wing" was released with the Axis album in December 1967 in the UK and the following month in the US. As one of only two songs from the album to become part of the Experience's concert repertoire, the Experience often performed it live and recordings were issued on early Hendrix posthumous albums Hendrix in the West in 1972 and The Jimi Hendrix Concerts in 1982. More recently, demo versions have been released as well as additional live renditions. "Little Wing" is one of Hendrix's most popular songs and has become a standard, with interpretations recorded by musicians in a variety of styles. In 2004, Rolling Stone magazine included "Little Wing" on its list of the "500 Greatest Songs of All Time" at number 357.

== Background ==
Jimi Hendrix began his career as a rhythm and blues guitarist and performed and recorded with several popular R&B artists, including the Isley Brothers, Don Covay, and Little Richard. He learned from other R&B guitarists, including Curtis Mayfield, who was known for his understated rhythmic fills and chording. (Note: Other R&B guitar influences include in-demand session guitarist Cornell Dupree, with whom Hendrix shared guitar duties while touring with King Curtis in 1966 and Steve Cropper with Stax Records/Booker T. & the M.G.'s.) Hendrix toured as a support act with Mayfield in 1963. He described the experience: "The best gig was with Curtis Mayfield and the Impressions. Curtis was a really good guitarist ... I learned a lot in that short time. He probably influenced me more than anyone I'd ever played with up to that time, that sweet sound of his, you know". In 1966, Hendrix recorded a song titled "(My Girl) She's a Fox" with the Icemen, an R&B duo. (Note: "(My Girl) She's a Fox" was written by brothers Richard and Robert Poindexter, who later wrote "Thin Line Between Love and Hate".) Hendrix biographer Harry Shapiro has described it as "paced and phrased in the style of Curtis Mayfield, [that] is virtually a blueprint for 'Little Wing'". Later Hendrix producer John McDermott called his contribution to "She's a Fox" (included on the 2010 West Coast Seattle Boy: The Jimi Hendrix Anthology) "perhaps the strongest of his pre-Experience career. Hendrix's Curtis Mayfield-influenced guitar styling is the song's strongest attribute".

According to Hendrix, "Little Wing" came from an idea he had originally developed while playing in Greenwich Village, when he was fronting his band Jimmy James and the Blue Flames in the summer of 1966. He later explained that he was further inspired during the Experience's performance at the 1967 Monterey Pop Festival: (Note: Underground chemist Owsley Stanley, who perfected the mass production of LSD before it was made illegal, was present "freely handing out LSD to musicians backstage". Hendrix was surprised to learn that the purple tabs had been nicknamed "purple haze" by some after his song.)

I got the idea like, when we were in Monterey and I was just looking at everything around. So I figured that I take everything I see around and put it maybe in the form of a girl maybe, somethin' like that, you know, and call it 'Little Wing', and then it will just fly away. Everybody's really flyin' and they're really in a nice mood, like the police and everybody was really, really great out there. So I just took all these things and put them in one very, very small little matchbox, you know, into a girl and then do it. It was very simple, but I like it though.

== Recording and composition ==
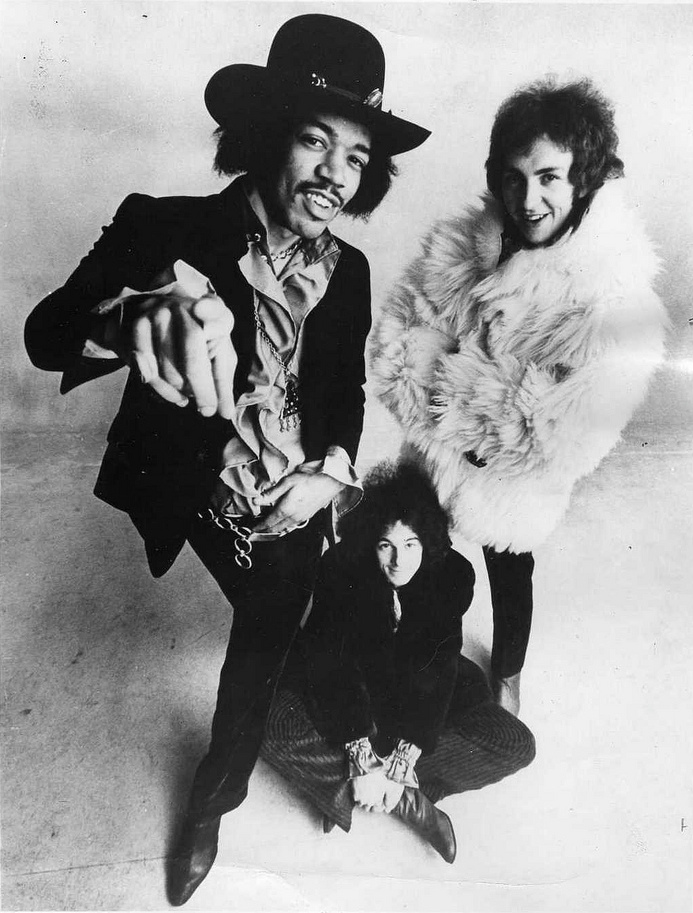
Jimi Hendrix Experience promotional photo circa 1968

In October 1967, recording sessions for the second Experience album, Axis: Bold as Love, began at Olympic Studios in London. On October 25, after recording the strongly R&B-oriented "Wait Until Tomorrow", the Experience recorded an instrumental version of "Little Wing". It followed the same chord progression as the later master recording, but had a more forceful rock feel. (Note: On October 14 or 15, 1967, Hendrix and drummer Mitch Mitchell recorded an early instrumental demo which was apparently labeled "Little Wing" on the tape box, although Shadwick claims that it was a mistake, because of its much closer resemblance to Hendrix's later song "Angel".) After another take in the same vein, Chandler called for a different approach. Recording engineer Eddie Kramer explained, "Chas knew right away what was needed. He had Jimi slow the tempo down and try it again". After the basic track was completed, Hendrix and Kramer recorded overdubs on October 28, 1967. For his recordings, Hendrix expended considerable effort to achieve the optimal tone for his guitar tracks. For his rhythm guitar, he had set his pickup selector to a nonstandard position between the neck and middle settings to achieve a "hollow" tone, sometimes mistakenly referred to as "out-of-phase". However, for the lead, Kramer later fed the guitar signal through a makeshift Leslie speaker, which was normally used for electric organs. By rotating the sound, Leslie speakers produce vibrato- and tremolo-like effects, i.e., a pulsing or quivering addition to the sound (Hendrix later popularized the use of the Univibe phase shifter effects pedal, which can be set to get a roughly similar effect). Next, Hendrix added a straight ("dry, without any effects") glockenspiel to underscore his vocal and guitar. According to Kramer, "Jimi always kept an eye out for odd instruments that would be lying about the studio" and found the glockenspiel in Studio A. Last to be recorded was his vocal, which was treated with sound processing techniques to give it an airy sound. These have been variously described as artificial double tracking (ADT), phasing, Pultec filter equalization, and processing with a Leslie speaker.

Regarding the song's arrangement, Shapiro commented, "Musically, 'Little Wing' is structured to lay a gossamer touch across the whole song from the arresting opening statement and the haunting glockenspiel to the use of a Leslie speaker cabinet for the guitar". According to AllMusic's Matthew Greenwald, it is based on a "gentle, soulful chord progression [which] guides the melody and is an accurate mirror of the title and lyrics". The song has been notated in 4/4 with one bar in 2/4 at a slow rock (70–72 beats per minute) tempo and is built on a chord progression without a bridge section: (Note: As with most Hendrix songs, his guitar is tuned down one-half step, resulting in a lower pitch.)

Em	G	Am	Em	Bm–B♭	Am–C	G–F^{add9}	2/4 C	4/4 D	rest

After an instrumental introduction, there are two verses, followed by a guitar solo, which has been described as "richly melodic" by biographer Keith Shadwick. Shapiro noted the song's brevity: "The song fades on a magical solo after only two minutes and twenty-five seconds. Even live, 'Little Wing' was hardly any longer – he said what he wanted to say and stopped".

Hendrix's use of guitar chords for the song involves unconventional finger positions and approach to the fretboard. Guitarist Frank Marino explained:

He had the tendency to play with his fingers very flat [on the guitar's fretboard], and he had a very long thumb, so he could come over the top of the neck to play bass notes. That left his fingers in a likely position to do all this chordal-type stuff. Playing with his fingers so flat also got him that double-string effect every time, like in 'Castles Made of Sand' or 'Little Wing". That's an R&B thing.

A reference work by Hal Leonard compares it to a pianist's approach, with Hendrix's "thumb fret[ting] the bass notes, functioning in almost the same manner as a keyboardist's left hand, and the fingers of his fretting hand can be likened to a pianist's right hand". Leonard also adds that guitarist Adrian Belew describes the technique as a "lost art".

The name "Little Wing" was first used by Hendrix as a working title for an entirely separate song, later re-titled "Angel" and released as a single posthumously.

== Lyrics and interpretation ==
In discussing his lyrics, Jimi Hendrix was characteristically enigmatic. In a 1967 interview, he explained "Most ballads come across in different ways. Sometimes you see things in different ways than other people see it. So then you write it in a song. It could represent anything". In different interviews, he acknowledged an American Indian-influence on his songs "I Don't Live Today", "May This Be Love", and "Little Wing". He described "Little Wing" as being "based on a very, very simple Indian style", perhaps referring to some Native American mythologies in which spirits inhabit nature and animals, including birds. In one interview, he saw it as self-explanatory: "That's exactly what it's about, like 'She's walking through the clouds'",

With a circus mind that's running wild
Butterflies and zebras, and moonbeams and fairy tales
That's all she ever thinks about, riding with the wind

Music journalist Charles Shaar Murray likens the figure to a feminine ideal: "Sometimes she is a spirit, sometimes a fantasy, sometimes a woman as solidly, palpably physical as he is". The figure first appears as "Waterfall" in "May This Be Love", where she offers solace and hope, and as "a soulful, loving sprite" in "Little Wing". However, other writers have suggested that the figure is similar to the guardian angel associated with Christianity, which is clearly what she represents in Hendrix's later song "Angel". (Note: "Angel" was issued as a single and on the album Cry of Love six months after his death.) Hendrix's brother, Leon, interpreted "Little Wing" (and "Angel") as a general tribute: "He wrote it for his girlfriends, our aunties, and especially for our mama, who looked over us from high above in the afterlife". (Note: Biographer Charles R. Cross' sometimes controversial Room Full of Mirrors: A Biography of Jimi Hendrix includes an unreferenced statement that "he [Hendrix] later told his brother Leon that both songs were about their mother, Lucille"; however, this is not mentioned in Leon's biography.) Hendrix's hand-written lyrics for "Angel" (with the note, "Finished January 14, 1968") use the title "My Angel Catherina (Return of Little Wing)", which suggests that he saw a connection between the two songs. At the time, Hendrix had just finished a short tour of Scandinavia, where he had performed "Little Wing" in concert for the first time. At some point he responded to a question, "Love? I know a girl, Katerina, in Sweden." In a later 1969 interview, Hendrix described his relationships while he was on tour: "So like 'Little Wing' is like one of these beautiful girls that come around sometimes ... She was a very sweet girl that came around that gave me her whole life and more if I wanted it. And me with my crazy ass couldn't get it together, so I'm off here and there and off over there."

== Releases ==
"Little Wing", along with the rest of the tracks for Axis: Bold as Love, was mixed October 31, 1967. Because some of the masters had been lost, stereo remixes were prepared on November 1 (it is not clear if "Little Wing" was among those remixed). On November 2, 1967, a monaural mix was prepared, making Axis the last Hendrix album specifically mixed in mono (subsequent mono albums were electronically "folded" from the stereo mixes). When recording engineer Kramer was preparing the album for a new mono reissue, he commented on the differences: "Perhaps the most unique track was 'Little Wing'. Jimi's guitar and vocals were much drier while the drum reverb was much more present. It was experimentation ... the entire [mono] album was all mixed in one day!"

The album was issued by Track Records in the UK on December 1, 1967, and Reprise Records on January 15, 1968, in the US. (Note: Reprise Records held up its US release of Axis: Bold as Love because of the December release of Get That Feeling, the Curtis Knight album on Capitol Records that was designed to look like a current Jimi Hendrix album.) The song appears on subsequent reissues of Axis: Bold as Love, which continues to be a best selling Hendrix album. (Note: 42 years after its first US release, Axis: Bold as Love reached number five on Billboard's "Catalog Albums" chart.) It has also been included on numerous Hendrix compilation albums, including The Essential Jimi Hendrix, Stone Free, The Ultimate Experience, Experience Hendrix: The Best of Jimi Hendrix, and Voodoo Child: The Jimi Hendrix Collection. In 2022, the British Phonographic Industry awarded "Little Wing" its Silver certification, signifying sales of over 200,000. However, it is unknown whether this applies to the original recording or a subsequent live version.

== Live performances ==
"Little Wing" was one of only two songs from Axis that the Experience regularly performed in concert, the other being "Spanish Castle Magic". Except for the glockenspiel and the song's ending, their live performances generally follow the studio arrangement. Since the Axis recording ends on a fade, Hendrix needed to devise a different live ending. Early recordings show a progression to an open chord, while later ones have more elaborate single-string guitar improvisation with effects, such as wah-wah, before a chiming final chord. For one 1968 performance in San Francisco, Hendrix's guitar signal was routed through a Leslie speaker. Writer Dave Rubin commented, "the real Leslie played outdoors [out of the studio] like this really gives a very delicate, gentle swirl to the chords and helps the chordal embellishments in the intro". This version was also rendered at a slower (56 bpm) tempo, making it somewhat longer (4:01).

On January 8, 1968, the Experience debuted the song at the Konserthuset in Stockholm, Sweden, recordings of which have appeared on bootleg albums. Other live versions appear on Stages: Paris 68 (L'Olympia Paris, January 29, 1968), The Jimi Hendrix Concerts (Winterland Ballroom San Francisco, October 12, 1968), and Hendrix in the West (Royal Albert Hall (Note: The original Hendrix in the West liner notes listed the venue as the San Diego Sports Arena.) London, February 24, 1969). These recordings have been reissued on Live in Paris & Ottawa 1968, Winterland, and The Jimi Hendrix Experience box set. The 1969 Royal Albert Hall live recording was included on singles issued in the UK and US in 1972. A March 17, 1968, instrumental jam with Hendrix and members of the Paul Butterfield Blues Band and the Electric Flag is built around "Little Wing". Hendrix recorded it for his personal use around the time he began recording tracks for Electric Ladyland at the Record Plant studio in New York. This low fidelity tape from the Cafe au Go Go, along with others from the Generation Club and the Scene in New York, was later stolen from his apartment and has appeared on several bootleg albums over the years.

== Notable covers and adaptations ==
=== Eric Clapton ===
English guitarist and singer Eric Clapton has performed "Little Wing" throughout his career, beginning in 1970 with Derek and the Dominos. He explained in an interview:

I found that his lyricism when he was writing ballads, like "Wind Cries Mary" or "Little Wing," was so different, in a way, that it was powerfully attractive to me. [It was] much more structured than some of his other things, and more melodic, too. ["Little Wing"] stands up so well that anyone could do it.

Derek and the Dominos performed the song in London at the Marquee Club ten days after their live debut at the Lyceum on June 14, 1970. With Duane Allman on second lead guitar, the group recorded "Little Wing" at Criteria Studios in Miami, during the sessions for Layla and Other Assorted Love Songs shortly before Hendrix's death on September 18, 1970. Clapton biographer Michael Schumacher notes, "Clapton had intended it as a tribute to a living legend, but now that Hendrix was gone, the song hit on a different emotional level."

Atco Records issued the song on a single as the B-side to "Bell Bottom Blues" and included it on Layla and Other Assorted Love Songs. Critics' comments on Derek and the Dominos' rendition range from "exquisitely arranged" (Rolling Stone) to "bombastic"(Legends of Rock Guitar). The group performed the song during their tour and a recording from the Fillmore East in New York City on October 23, 1970, was released on the Live at the Fillmore album in 1994.

After the break up of Derek and the Dominos, Clapton continued to perform "Little Wing". Live recordings appear on Eric Clapton's Rainbow Concert (1973), Crossroads 2: Live in the Seventies (1974, released 1996), Eric Clapton & Friends in Concert (DVD with Sheryl Crow 1999), Live in San Diego (2007, released 2016), Live from Madison Square Garden (with Steve Winwood 2008, released 2009).

=== Stevie Ray Vaughan ===
Texas blues musician Stevie Ray Vaughan recorded an instrumental version in 1984, although it was not released until 1991, when it appeared on Vaughan's posthumously released album The Sky Is Crying. Vaughan's interpretation of the song won the 1993 Grammy Award for Best Rock Instrumental Performance.

=== Sting ===
Sting covered "Little Wing" on his second solo album, "...Nothing Like the Sun." In the studio version Hiram Bullock plays lead guitar, though Jeffrey Lee Campbell played on the accompanying tour.

=== Others ===
- Concrete Blonde covered the song on the B-side of their 1989 "God Is A Bullet" 12" maxi-single
- Steve Vai - featured as a regular part of the live set and is included on the album "Live In London" from 2003.
- The Corrs - featured as an album track on "Talk on Corners".
- Valerie June - recorded as a single in 2019.

== Recognition and legacy ==
Rolling Stone has included "Little Wing" on its list of the "500 Greatest Songs of All Time" at number 357 in 2004, number 366 when the list was updated in 2010, and 188 in 2021 and 2024. Several musicians have recorded the song in a variety of styles.

Gil Evans included a jazz arrangement in his band's repertoire throughout his career. A version was later included on an expanded reissue of The Gil Evans Orchestra Plays the Music of Jimi Hendrix (1974). In 1987, Evans provided an arrangement and backing for a recording by English musician Sting for his second solo album ...Nothing Like the Sun. Murray describes Evans' involvement as "almost his last creative act" (Evans died less than a year later). Sting recording a version of the song, translated into Portuguese with the title "Mariposa Libre" for his 1988 EP "Nada como el sol".

Irish pop rock band the Corrs recorded the song for their 1997 album Talk on Corners. An AllMusic album review noted "[t]he best and most spirited Celtic cut is 'Little Wing,' deliciously resting on the contributions of the dropping-by Chieftains."

== Notes ==
Footnotes
