= Charlie Segar =

American songwriter

Charlie Segar (1900–1957) was an American blues pianist and occasional singer, who is best known for being the first to record the blues standard, "Key to the Highway" (1940). Originally from Pensacola, Florida, Segar has been dubbed the "Keyboard Wizard Supreme". He relocated to Chicago, where he made recordings with other blues artists, such as Bumble Bee Slim and Memphis Minnie, as well as being the featured artist.

Segar recorded eight known songs under his own name between 1934 and 1940 for Decca Records and Vocalion Records:

- "Cuban Villa Blues" / "Southern Hospitality" (Decca 7027)
- "Cow Cow Blues" / "Boogie Woogie" (Decca 7075)
- "Key to the Highway" / "Stop and Fix It Mama" (Vocalion 05441)
- "Lonesome Graveyard Blues" / "Dissatisfied Blues" (Vocalion 05539)

These are included on Piano Blues, Vol. 2: 1927–1956, the Document Records compilation album of piano tunes by various artists. In an album review for AllMusic, Scott Yanow noted Segar's recordings as "including four excellent piano solos".

Segar's grave at Restvale Cemetery

In 2018 the Killer Blues Headstone Project placed a headstone for Charlie Segar at Restvale Cemetery in Alsip, Illinois.
