= Jimmy Cox =

American songwriter (1882–1925)

James Cox (July 28, 1882 – March 3, 1925) was an American vaudeville performer, and songwriter famous for his Jazz Age hit, "Nobody Knows You When You're Down and Out", written in 1923 in the wake of the 1920–1921 economic depression.

Jimmy Cox's daughter, Gertrude "Baby" Cox, sang with Duke Ellington's orchestra in 1928. Jimmy Cox died on March 3, 1925, at age 42.
