= Key to the Highway =

Blues standard popularized by Little Walter

Single by Charlie Segar
- Released: 1940
- Recorded: Chicago, February 23, 1940
- Genre: Blues
- Length: 2:54
- Label: Vocalion
- Songwriter: Unknown (Segar credited on single)

"Key to the Highway" is a blues standard that has been performed and recorded by several blues and other artists. Blues pianist Charlie Segar first recorded the song in 1940. Jazz Gillum and Big Bill Broonzy followed with recordings in 1940 and 1941, using an arrangement that has become the standard.

When Little Walter updated the song in 1958 in an electric Chicago blues style, it became a success on the R&B record chart. A variety of artists have since interpreted the song, including Eric Clapton, who recorded several versions.

== Original recordings ==
"Key to the Highway" is usually credited to Charles "Chas" Segar and William "Big Bill" Broonzy. Broonzy explained the song's development:

Some of the verses he [Charlie Segar] was singing it in the South the same time as I sung it in the South. And practically all of blues is just a little change from the way that they was sung when I was a kid ... You take one song and make fifty out of it ... just change it a little bit.

Segar's lyrics are nearly the same as those recorded by Broonzy and Jazz Gillum. The verses use the theme of the itinerant bluesman leaving to travel the highways after breaking up with his lover:

I got the key to the highway, billed out and bound to go
I'm gonna leave here runnin', because walkin' is much too slow ...
Give me one more kiss mama, just before I go
'Cause when I'm leavin' here, I won't be back no more

Musically, however, there are differences in the recorded versions. Charlie Segar's original "Key to the Highway" was performed as a mid-tempo twelve-bar blues. When Jazz Gillum recorded it later that year with Broonzy on guitar, he used an eight-bar blues arrangement (May 9, 1940 Bluebird B 8529). In two different interviews, Gillum gave conflicting stories about who wrote the song: in one, he claimed sole authorship, in another he identified Broonzy "the real author". The chord progression is as follows:

I	V^{7}	IV	IV	I	V^{7}	I–IV	I–V^{7}

A year later, Broonzy recorded "Key to the Highway" with Gillum on harmonica, Horace Malcolm on piano, Washboard Sam on washboard, and an unknown bassist, also using an eight-bar arrangement. According to Broonzy, he used an original melody which was based on childhood songs. These earliest recorded versions of "Key to the Highway" were released before record industry trade publications such as Billboard magazine began tracking such releases. While it is difficult to gauge which version was the most popular, the eight-bar arrangement used by Gillum and Broonzy has become the standard for subsequent recordings.

== Little Walter version ==
"Key to the Highway"

Single by Little Walter and His Jukes
- B-side: "Rock Bottom"
- Released: September 28, 1958
- Recorded: Chicago, August 1958
- Genre: Blues
- Length: 2:49
- Label: Checker
- Songwriter: Unknown (not listed on single)
- Producers: Leonard Chess; Phil Chess; Willie Dixon

Little Walter and His Jukes singles chronology
"The Toddle" (1958)	"Key to the Highway" (1958)	"My Baby Is Sweeter" (1959)

Shortly after Broonzy's death in 1958, Little Walter recorded "Key to the Highway" as an apparent tribute to him. He adapted it as a Chicago blues with a full band. The session took place sometime in August and backing Walter (vocals and harmonica) were Muddy Waters (slide guitar), Luther Tucker (guitar), Otis Spann (piano), Willie Dixon (bass), and George Hunter or Francis Clay (drums).

The song was a hit, spending fourteen weeks in the Billboard R&B chart where it reached number six in 1958. After a six-year run of successful singles, Little Walter only had one charting single after "Key to the Highway". The song is included on several Little Walter compilation albums, including His Best.

== Eric Clapton versions ==
Eric Clapton recorded "Key to the Highway" for Derek and the Dominos' 1970 landmark album Layla and Other Assorted Love Songs. Lasting over nine minutes, it is essentially an impromptu jam. Clapton and Duane Allman heard singer Sam Samudio, better known as "Sam the Sham", performing the song in a neighboring studio and spontaneously started playing it themselves. When record producer Tom Dowd heard it, he quickly told the engineers to "hit the goddamn machine!" to start the tape recorder. Because of the late start, the album track starts with a fade-in to a performance already underway.

A live version of the song appears on the 1995 remastered edition of Eric Clapton's Rainbow Concert recordings from the 1973 concert. Clapton also recorded the song with other musicians: Johnnie Johnson for his 1991 album Johnnie B. Bad and in 2000 with B.B. King for their collaboration album Riding with the King. Another Clapton version is included on his 2002 live album One More Car, One More Rider. During two Allman Brothers shows at the Beacon Theatre in New York City on March 19 and 20, 2009, Clapton joined the band onstage to perform the song.

== Recognition and influence ==
"Key to the Highway" is recognized as a blues standard. In 2010, the Blues Foundation inducted Broonzy's rendition into the Blues Hall of Fame. "Key to the Highway" has been recorded by numerous blues and other artists. It was one of the songs played at Duane Allman's 1971 funeral in Macon, Georgia. An excerpt from a performance of "Key to the Highway" by the Rolling Stones co-founder Ian Stewart appears as a hidden track on the band's album, Dirty Work (1986), included as a tribute to Stewart, who died shortly before the album's release.

In 2024, Jazz Gillum's version was inducted to the Blues Hall of Fame.
