= Tell the Truth (Derek and the Dominos song) =

Song by Derek and the Dominos

from the album Layla and Other Assorted Love Songs
- Released: November 1970
- Recorded: August–September 1970
- Studio: Criteria, Miami
- Genre: Blues rock, hard rock
- Length: 6:39
- Label: Polydor, Atco
- Songwriters: Eric Clapton, Bobby Whitlock
- Producers: Tom Dowd, Derek and the Dominos

"Tell the Truth" is a song by the English–American band Derek and the Dominos, released in 1970 as the eighth track on their album Layla and Other Assorted Love Songs. The song was composed primarily by keyboardist Bobby Whitlock, with guitarist Eric Clapton adding the last verse. The band recorded the track at Criteria Studios in Miami, Florida in August 1970, with Tom Dowd as their producer.

An earlier version of "Tell the Truth" was recorded in London during the sessions for George Harrison's 1970 triple album All Things Must Pass. The session marked the first recordings by Derek and the Dominos. Produced by Phil Spector, this original, faster version of the song featured guitar contributions from Harrison and Dave Mason. It was issued as Derek and the Dominos' debut single, in September 1970, although the band had the release withdrawn.

== Background ==
Just twenty-two at the time, Whitlock wrote "Tell the Truth" during the early summer of 1970, while living temporarily with Clapton in England. Whitlock worked out the melody on a guitar tuned in open E, having learned that alternative tuning when Duane Allman was playing with his former band, Delaney & Bonnie and Friends. Whitlock recalled:

'Tell the Truth' I wrote one night after we'd been up for days on one of our marathons. We used to just play and play and play. We would literally play for 3 days without stopping. Anyway, I was up by myself sitting in Eric's living room when this thing just hit me. I was a young man, gaining experience and getting older; that's what I was thinking about.

== Recording ==
As admirers of Sam and Dave, Clapton and Whitlock styled the song as a "call and response" with the pair singing alternating verses. "Tell the Truth" was recorded on 18 June 1970 as the first original song by what became Derek and the Dominos: Clapton, Whitlock, drummer Jim Gordon and bassist Carl Radle. The four musicians had just helped George Harrison record the majority of the basic tracks for his album All Things Must Pass, before which Harrison had agreed to Clapton's request that his co-producer on the album, Phil Spector, would help the Dominos make their first recording as a group. Four days before the session, Derek and the Dominos, with Dave Mason as second guitarist, had played "Tell the Truth" at their debut concert, held at London's Lyceum Ballroom.

The session for the song and for the Clapton–Whitlock collaboration "Roll It Over" took place at Apple Studio in central London, with the intention being to issue the tracks as the A- and B-sides of the group's first single. In addition to the four band members, the line-up on "Tell the Truth" again featured Mason as second guitarist, as well as Harrison on electric guitar. Harrison also played on "Roll It Over", contributing a slide guitar part.

In August 1970, while recording their album Layla with producer Tom Dowd, the band decided to remake "Tell the Truth". Author Jan Reid writes of the London-recorded version: "the problem wasn't Spector's fabled Wall of Sound engineering control – rather, it sounded as though they sang and played the song about 20 percent too fast. In Spector's production, the lyrics and the voices of Clapton and Whitlock flew by in meaningless garble: the song lost its insight and sense of humor." Dowd and the members of the band struggled with the song until Duane Allman was added to the group, after Clapton and members of Derek and the Dominos met him in a concert. Following the concert, Allman joined the band at Criteria Studios in Miami, where they recorded "Tell the Truth" on 28 August.

With Allman's slide guitar providing a counterpoint to the melody played by Whitlock and Clapton, Dowd and the band were finally satisfied with the song. Clapton subsequently called Robert Stigwood, record executive of RSO, and told him not to issue the original version of "Tell the Truth" as a single. In the United States, Atco Records released the single on 14 September 1970, but the record was soon withdrawn. The Dowd production of the song then appeared as the opening song on side three of the Layla double album, issued in November 1970.

The single has since become a sought-after collector's item. Two versions of "Tell the Truth" were later released on The History of Eric Clapton (1972), the Spector version and a previously unissued jam entitled "Tell the Truth – Jam". The Spector-produced recording and "Roll It Over" also appeared on Clapton's four-CD compilation Crossroads in 1988, while "Tell the Truth – Jam" featured on The Layla Sessions: 20th Anniversary Edition in 1990 as "Tell the Truth (Jam #1)".

Whitlock recorded an upbeat version of "Tell the Truth" for his second solo album, Raw Velvet (1972). This was recently included in the 2013 compilation Bobby Whitlock: Where There's a Will There's a Way. The ABC Dunhill Recordings. Musicians on that recording included all the Dominos, plus George Harrison, Jim Price, Bobby Keys and Rick Vito.

== Live performances ==
"Tell the Truth" has been frequently played at Eric Clapton's subsequent concerts. Live versions of the song have been included on several of Clapton's albums as well including the deluxe release of 461 Ocean Boulevard, Crossroads Guitar Festival and Live From Madison Square Garden. The song has been sometimes played with and sometimes without the slide part added by Allman. At the Crossroads Festival of 2007, Derek Trucks played the Allman licks. In the Live from Madison Square Garden concert of 2008, with Steve Winwood, there is no slide guitar but Clapton plays a longer solo than what was originally recorded in the studio.

== Sources ==
- Castleman, Harry; Podrazik, Walter J. (1976). All Together Now: The First Complete Beatles Discography 1961–1975. New York, NY: Ballantine Books. ISBN 0-345-25680-8.
- Clapton, Eric; with Sykes, Christopher Simon (2007). Eric Clapton: The Autobiography. London: Century. ISBN 978-1-8460-5309-2.
- Clayson, Alan (2003). George Harrison. London: Sanctuary. ISBN 1-86074-489-3.
- Madinger, Chip; Easter, Mark (2000). Eight Arms to Hold You: The Solo Beatles Compendium. Chesterfield, MO: 44.1 Productions. ISBN 0-615-11724-4.
- Reid, Jan (2006). Layla and Other Assorted Love Songs by Derek and the Dominos. New York, NY: Rodale. ISBN 978-1-59486-369-1.
- Sandford, Christopher (1999). Clapton: Edge of Darkness. New York, NY: Da Capo Press. ISBN 0-306-80897-8.
- Santoro, Gene (1995). Dancing in Your Head: Jazz, Blues, Rock, and Beyond. New York, NY: Oxford University Press. ISBN 0-19-510123-5.
- Schumacher, Michael (1995). Crossroads: The Life and Music of Eric Clapton. New York, NY: Hyperion. ISBN 0-7868-6074-X.
- Whitlock, Bobby; with Roberty, Mark (2010). Bobby Whitlock: A Rock 'n' Roll Autobiography. Jefferson, NC: McFarland. ISBN 978-0-7864-6190-5.
