= Fool =

Fool, The Fool, or Fools may refer to:

- A jester, also called a fool, a type of historical entertainer known for their witty jokes

== Arts, entertainment and media ==
=== Fictional characters ===
- The Fool (fictional character), a fictional character in The Realm of the Elderlings by Robin Hobb
- Fool (stock character), in literature and folklore
- Fool, a character in the Adventure Time miniseries "Stakes"
- Shakespearean fool, an archetypal character in numerous works by Shakespeare

=== Film ===
- The Fool (1913 film), a British silent film
- The Fool (1925 film), a lost silent film
- The Fool (1990 film), a British film
- The Fool (2014 film), a Russian film
- A Fool, a 2015 Chinese film directed by Chen Jianbin
- Fools (1970 film), an American film
- Fools (2003 film), an Indian film directed by Dasari Narayana Rao

=== Television ===
- "The Fool" (Industry), a 2022 television episode

=== Gaming and Tarot ===
- Fool (card game)
- The Fool (Tarot card games)
- The Fool (tarot card)

=== Literature ===
- The Fool (novel), an 1880 Armenian language novel by Raffi
- The Fool, a 1921 novel by H. C. Bailey
- Fool (novel), a 2009 novel by Christopher Moore
- The Fool (play), a 1975 play by Edward Bond
- Fools (play), a 1981 play by Neil Simon
- Fools, a 1992 science fiction novel by Pat Cadigan

=== Music ===
- The Fool (design collective), a Dutch design collective and band in the 1960s
  - The Fool (guitar), a 1964 Gibson SG designed by The Fool for Eric Clapton
- The Fools, a musical group from Massachusetts, U.S.

==== Albums ====
- Fool (Joe Jackson album), 2019
- Fool (Jameszoo album), 2016
- The Fool (Bladee album), 2021
- The Fool (The Fool album), 1968
- The Fool (Jain album), 2023
- The Fool (Warpaint album), 2010
- The Fool (Ryn Weaver album), 2015
- Fools (The Reason album), 2010
- Fools (EP), by Lauren Aquilina, 2012

==== Songs ====
- "Fool" (Elvis Presley song), 1973
- "Fool (If You Think It's Over)", a song by Chris Rea, 1978
- "Fool" by Blur, from the 1991 album Leisure
- "Fool" by Cat Power, from the 2003 album You Are Free
- "Fool" by Dragon, from the 1984 album Body and the Beat
- "Fool", by Fitz and the Tantrums from their 2016 self-titled album
- "Fool" (Mansun song), from the 2000 album Little Kix
- "Fool" (Al Matthews song), 1975 single by Al Matthews
- "Fool" by Memphis May Fire, from the 2018 album Broken
- "Fool" by The Rasmus, from the 2006 album Peep
- "Fool" by Red Velvet, from the 2016 extended play Russian Roulette
- "Fool" by Roxette, from their 2001 album Room Service
- "Fool" by Shakira, from the 2001 album Laundry Service
- "Fool" by Swans from the album Greed
- "Fool (#2)" by Swans from the album Holy Money
- "Fool (I Feel Bad for You)" by Medina, from the U.S. release of 2012 Forever album
- "The Fool" (Sanford Clark song), 1956
- "The Fool" (Lee Ann Womack song), 1997
- "The Fool", a 1971 single by Gilbert Montagné
- "The Fool" by Neutral Milk Hotel, from the album In the Aeroplane over the Sea
- "The Fool" by Camper Van Beethoven, from the 1988 album Our Beloved Revolutionary Sweetheart
- "The Fool" by The Fixx, from the 1982 album Shuttered Room
- "The Fool" by Quicksilver Messenger Service, from the 1968 album Quicksilver Messenger Service
- "The Fool" by Luna Halo from their 2007 self-titled album
- "The Fool" by Fleshgod Apocalypse from their 2016 album King
- "Fools" (song), a 1994 song by Alphaville
- "Fools" by Deep Purple, from their 1971 album Fireball
- "Fools" by High Valley, from the 2026 extended play Paradise & Hurricanes
- "Fools" by Madison Beer, from the 2018 extended play As She Pleases
- "Fools" by Rachel Stevens, from the 2003 album Funky Dory
- "Fools" by Troye Sivan, from the 2015 album Wild
- "Fools" by Uriah Heep, from the 1980 album Conquest
- "Fools" by Van Halen, from the 1980 album Women and Children First

== Food ==
- Fruit fool, a dish made with cooked fruit such as gooseberries or bilberries
- Ful (pronounced "fool") or ful medames, a Middle Eastern dish made from fava beans

== Other uses ==
- Fools Peak, a mountain in Colorado
- Léon-Mba International Airport, Libreville, Gabon, ICAO airport code FOOL
- The Motley Fool, a financial advice company (fool.com) nicknamed "the Fool"

== See also ==
- Folly (disambiguation)
- Foolish (disambiguation)
- Foolishness, the unawareness or lack of social norms which causes offence, annoyance, trouble or injury
- FoolishPeople, a British theatre collective
- Fool's Gold, colloquial name for the mineral iron pyrite
- Fools Guild, a social club of comedic performers
- Foolscap (disambiguation)
- List of jesters
- Clown
- Harlequin
- Jester (disambiguation)
- Joker (disambiguation)
- Magic (illusion)
- Stupidity
- Tomfoolery (disambiguation)
- Yokel
