= Picnic (disambiguation) =

A picnic is a meal eaten outside.

Picnic, Picnik or Piknik may also refer to:

== Arts and entertainment ==
- Picnic (play), a 1953 play by William Inge
  - Picnic (1955 film), a film starring William Holden and Kim Novak
    - "Theme from Picnic" or simply "Picnic", a song from the 1955 film
  - Picnic (2000 film), an American TV film adaptation starring Bonnie Bedelia
- Picnic (1972 film), an Indian Bengali-language film starring Ranjit Mallick
- Picnic (1975 film), an Indian Malayalam-language film starring Prem Nazir and Laksmi
- Picnic (1996 film), a Japanese film directed by Shunji Iwai
- Picnic (2024 film), a South Korean drama film
- Picnic, a 2004 short film starring Yolandi Visser under her birth name Anri du Toit
- "Picnic" (Peppa Pig), a Peppa Pig episode
- Picnic (manga), a yaoi manga by Yugi Yamada
- Picnic (TV series), a Mexican talk show
- Pic-Nic, a Spanish folk-pop band of the 1960s
- Picnic (album), an album by Robert Earl Keen
- Picnic – A Breath of Fresh Air, a sampler album issued by Harvest Records
- Picnic (band), a Russian rock band
- Picknick (album), a 1968 album by Boudewijn de Groot
- "Picnic", an episode of the TV series Pocoyo
- "Picnic" (Shifting Gears), an episode of the American TV series Shifting Gears

== Places ==
- Picnic, Florida, a US town
- Picnic Island, Tasmania

== Events ==
- Picnic Day (disambiguation)
- A public holiday in Poland
  - Piknik Country, a festival in Poland

== Products ==
- Shoulder picnic, a cut of pork
- Cadbury Picnic, a chocolate bar
- Toyota Picnic or Ipsum, a minivan
- Picnik, a former online photo editor
- Sky Picnic, a proposed pay-TV service from BSkyB
- Picnic (supermarket), an online-only supermarket active in the Netherlands, Germany and France

== Other uses ==
- Problem In Chair, Not In Computer (PICNIC), a derogatory slang term for computer user error

== See also ==
- The Picnic (disambiguation)
