= ARMS Charity Concerts =

Series of charitable rock concerts

The ARMS Charity Concerts were a series of charitable rock concerts in support of Action into Research for Multiple Sclerosis in 1983. The first (and initially planned to be the only) event took place at the Royal Albert Hall on September 20, 1983, with subsequent dates occurring in the United States, with slightly different lineups of musicians.

== Royal Albert Hall ARMS Concert ==
The idea for hosting the concert was envisaged by Ronnie Lane, ex-bassist for Small Faces and Faces, himself a casualty of multiple sclerosis. The concert was billed as The Ronnie Lane Appeal for ARMS and featured a variety of British musicians, including Jimmy Page, Eric Clapton, Jeff Beck, Steve Winwood, Ronnie Wood, Andy Fairweather Low, Bill Wyman, Kenney Jones, Charlie Watts and Ray Cooper. The concert was notable for being the first occasion on which Clapton, Beck and Page, each a former lead guitarist for The Yardbirds, had performed together on stage.

The set list for the ARMS Charity Concert Video was as follows:

Eric Clapton

- "Everybody Oughta Make A Change"
- "Rita May"
- "Lay Down Sally"
- "Ramblin' On My Mind"/"Have You Ever Loved a Woman"
- "Cocaine"

Andy Fairweather Low

- "Man Smart (Woman Smarter)"

Steve Winwood with Eric Clapton

- "(I'm A) Road Runner"
- "Take Me To The River"
- "Slowdown Sundown"
- "Gimme Some Lovin'"

Intermission

Jeff Beck

- "Star Cycle"
- "The Pump"
- "Goodbye Pork Pie Hat"/"Led Boots"
- "Hi Ho Silver Lining"

Jimmy Page

- "Prelude" (with James Hooker)
- "City Sirens" (with Steve Winwood)
- "Who's To Blame" (with Steve Winwood)
- "Stairway to Heaven" (Instrumental)

All

- "Tulsa Time"
- "Layla"
- "Goodnight, Irene" (with Ronnie Lane)

The complete show lasted just under three hours and included "Wonderful Tonight", "Hound Dog", "Best That I Can", "Wee Wee Baby" and "Bombers Moon".

Clapton, Winwood, Beck and Page each performed sets, with Andy Fairweather Low and Steve Winwood also performing songs. Clapton, with Fairweather Low, Bill Wyman, Chris Stainton, percussionist Ray Cooper, Kenney Jones, James Hooker, Steve Winwood and Fernando Saunders performed a selection of blues and rock numbers. Jeff Beck's set consisted largely of instrumental rock jazz-fusion numbers, though he did perform his 1960s hit "Hi Ho Silver Lining". Jimmy Page's set was made up, first, of three numbers taken from the Death Wish II music he had put together for director Michael Winner earlier that year. The set ended with an instrumental version of "Stairway to Heaven", which evoked a great cheer from the audience. Prince Charles and Lady Diana were in attendance seated in the Royal box in the upper level.

After Page's set, the entire cast of musicians gathered on stage to perform "Tulsa Time", a blues rock/country number from Clapton's album Backless, and then "Layla". In each number, Clapton, Beck and Page each shared lead guitar duties, and, notably in "Layla", each performed a different, and unique guitar solo.

At the concert's end, Ronnie Lane appeared on stage. Expressing thanks not only to the audience, saying that what had been achieved was 'terrific', he also thanked 'all the boys on the stage too', and then led the musicians in a rendition of "Goodnight Irene".

== U.S. ARMS Concerts ==
The ARMS charity concert proved so popular with both the audience and the musicians that the decision was taken to perform a further nine concerts in the USA. The US dates included Joe Cocker, who notably sang lead vocals on "With a Little Help from My Friends", and Clapton, Jeff Beck and Jimmy Page each shared lead guitar duties on "Layla". While Ronnie Lane appeared in New York, he did not appear at all of the US dates. The first US dates were in Dallas, Texas at Reunion Arena on November 28 and 29, 1983. They played in San Francisco at the Cow Palace from December 1 through 3, 1983, for three sold-out shows. They played in Inglewood, CA at the Forum on December 5 and 6, and finished in New York City at Madison Square Garden on December 8 and 9. Also, Steve Winwood was unable to do the American shows and Paul Rodgers was now playing in Page's set. (They later formed The Firm together.)

== Recordings ==
A VHS video and a laserdisc (no longer on sale or in circulation) exists of the Albert Hall concert. A DVD is now on general release. On "Rita Mae" and "Cocaine", Clapton can be seen playing a Gibson Explorer rather than his famed Stratocaster Blackie that he used on all other numbers apart from "Everybody Oughta Make a Change", "Goodnight Irene" (an acoustic number) and "Tulsa Time" on which he used Brownie – the 1956 sunburst finish Stratocaster most famously used on "Layla", and later best known as the world's most expensive guitar when sold for $450,000 on June 24, 1999. (But a source states it was another brown sunburst stratocaster that Clapton used for slide play around that era.)

== Musicians ==
These musicians performed at the London concert:

- bass – Bill Wyman, Fernando Saunders
- drums – Charlie Watts, Kenney Jones, Simon Phillips
- drums, percussion – Ray Cooper
- guitars – Jimmy Page
- guitars, keyboards, vocals – Andy Fairweather Low
- guitars, vocals – Eric Clapton, Jeff Beck
- keyboards – Chris Stainton, James Hooker, Tony Hymas
- vocals – Ronnie Lane
- vocals, keyboards, mandolin – Steve Winwood

On the U.S. tour, Winwood and Hymas did not appear. These musicians joined the lineup:

- guitars – Ronnie Wood (Madison Square Garden only)
- keyboards – Jan Hammer
- vocals – Joe Cocker
- vocals – Paul Rodgers
