= The Fool (guitar) =

Electric guitar

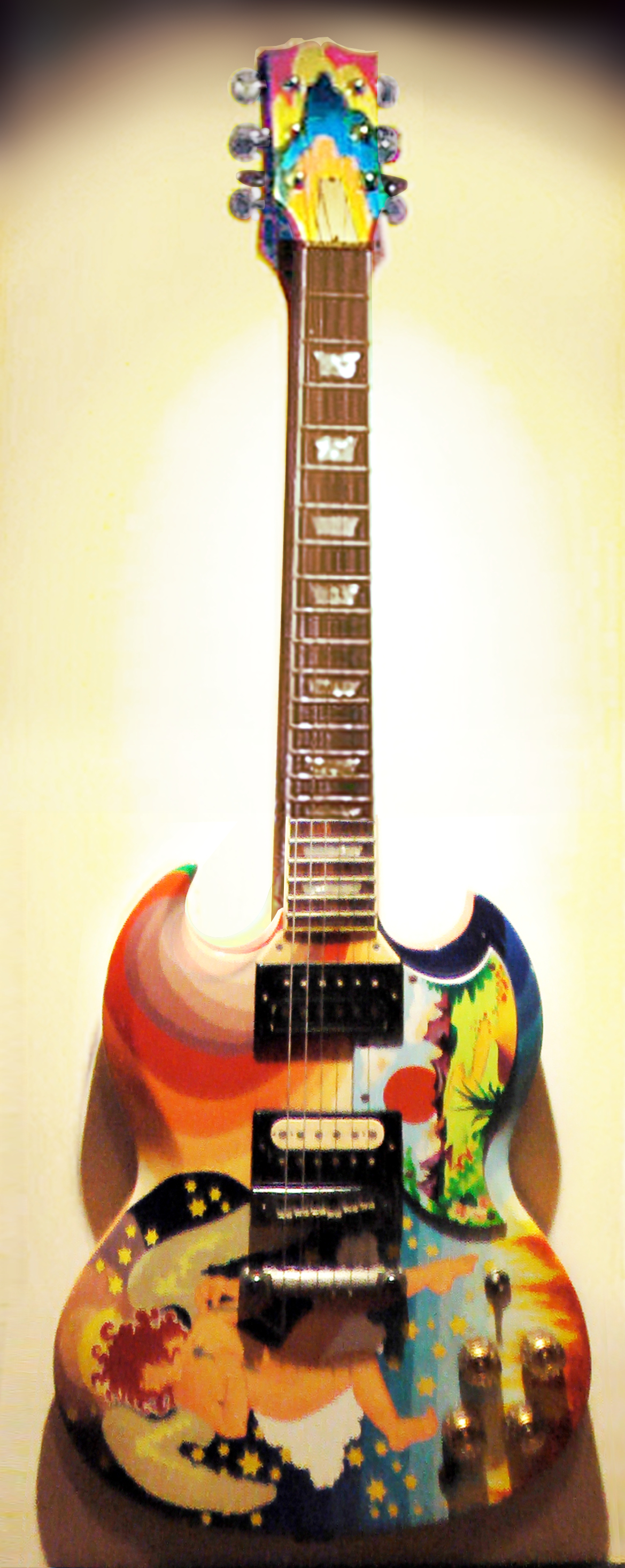
A replica of The Fool guitar exhibited at Hard Rock Cafe San Antonio

The Fool (also occasionally referred to as Sunny) is a 1964 Gibson SG guitar, painted for Eric Clapton by the Dutch design collective The Fool, from which the guitar takes its name. One of the world's best-known guitars, it epitomizes the psychedelic era. Clapton used the guitar extensively while playing with Cream and it was an essential element of his famed "woman tone". From the 1970s to early 1980s, the guitar was owned by Todd Rundgren, who was often seen playing the instrument in his live performances. He nicknamed the guitar "Sunny", after the Cream song "Sunshine of Your Love".

== History ==
The Fool, a "psychedelic fantasy", according to Clapton, was the brainchild of Marijke Koger who, along with Simon Posthuma, was a founding member of The Fool design collective. In early 1967, the collective were contacted by Robert Stigwood, then manager of Cream, to work on instruments and costumes for the band, which was about to leave London for their debut tour of the United States. Koger and Posthuma painted Clapton's Gibson SG, a drum kit for Ginger Baker, and a Fender Bass VI for Jack Bruce, which he did not like very much and played only on TV performances.

The guitar made its debut as Cream played their first show in the United States on 25 March 1967 at the RKO theater on 58th Street, Manhattan, where Cream and The Who played a series of shows headlined by Mitch Ryder, Wilson Pickett, and promoted by Murray the K. Clapton used the guitar for most of Cream's recordings after Fresh Cream, particularly on Disraeli Gears, until the band broke up in 1968. After Clapton gave it to George Harrison, it passed to Jackie Lomax. It then passed to Todd Rundgren, who had seen Clapton play it during Cream's show at the RKO Theater and was "mesmerized" by it. According to differing reports, Rundgren reportedly either paid $500 for the guitar, was gifted the guitar, or just retained the guitar after Lomax failed to return to retrieve it, and had various repairs done to it. He had the guitar finished anew and retouched in places, and a portion of the neck and headstock was replaced. Rundgren sold the guitar in 2000 at auction for less than $150,000 to pay off a tax debt, donating 10% to Clapton's Crossroads Centre. The Fool was resold to a private collector a few years later for around $500,000. In November 2023, The Fool was purchased by Jim Irsay and The Jim Irsay Collection. It was most recently sold in March 2026 at a Christie's auction, setting the record price fetched for a Gibson guitar at just over $3 million.

The Fool has had other work done: some of the control knobs have been replaced and, most notably, the original trapeze-style tailpiece was replaced with a stop-tailpiece. The guitar now has Grover tuners rather than the original Klusons.

== Execution ==
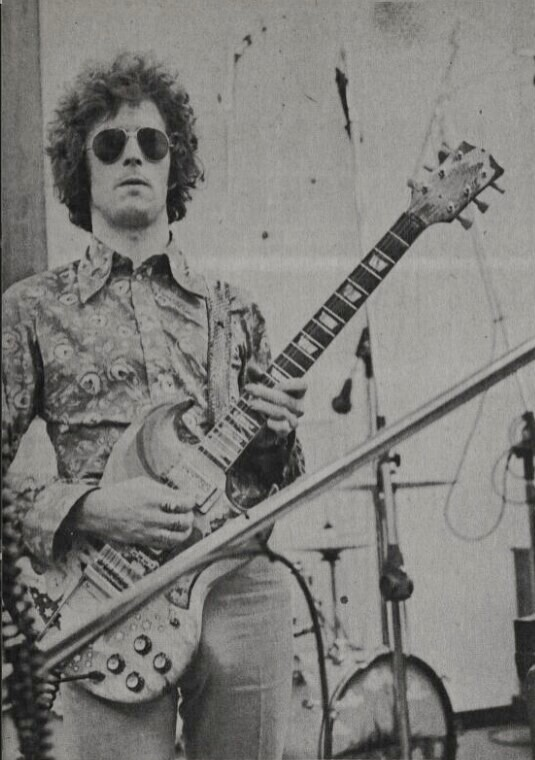
Eric Clapton playing The Fool with Cream

Koger and Posthuma sanded Clapton's 1964 SG Standard (not, as is found in various sources, a 1961 model, and not an SG Special) and painted it with oil-based enamel paint in the "gaudy dayglo colours of the day". As Koger explained, "the single thread running through all of my paintings is nostalgia for paradise." The theme of the SG's design is "good versus evil, heaven versus hell, and the power of music in the universe to rise above it all as a force of good". The centrepiece on the face is a cherub holding a triangle, surrounded by yellow stars on a celestial blue background ("a Fool hallmark"). The angel's curly hairstyle was inspired by Clapton's hairstyle at the time. Flames come up from the bottom of the guitar (the treble bout with the volume and tone controls) and the bass point has rainbow-coloured arcs. The pick guard contains a landscape with mountains and a red sun on the horizon, a "Dutch miniature" representing paradise. On the back, coloured concentric circles are surrounded by coloured waves. Pictures exist of the guitar with the fretboard painted as well, though Clapton quickly removed this paint as it interfered with his playing of the instrument.

== Cultural significance ==
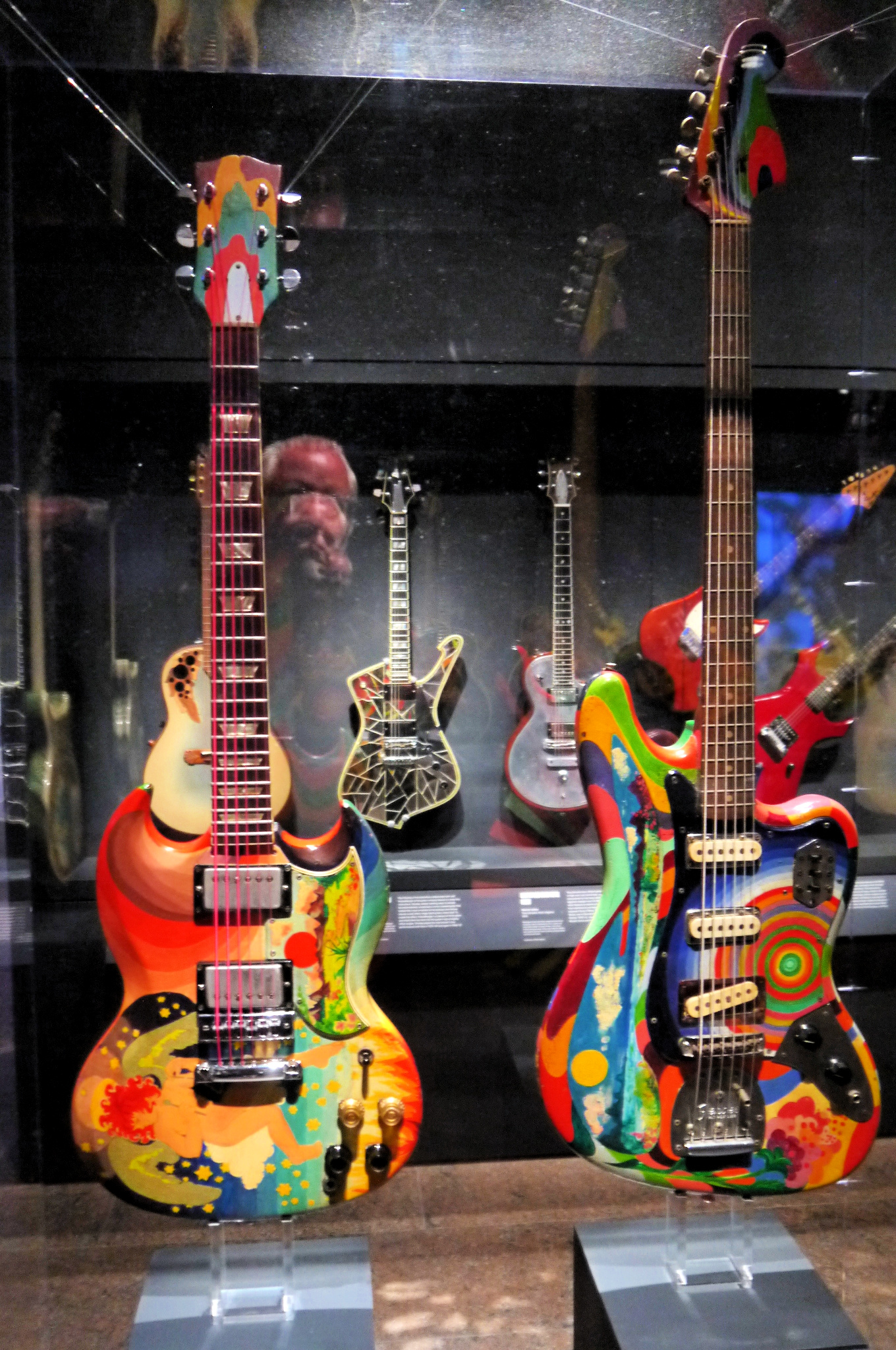
The Fool SG (1964 Gibson) and The Fool Bass VI (1962 Fender) exhibited at "Play It Loud", MET

Clapton's guitar is a key relic of the psychedelic fashion and design fad that flourished from the mid-to-late 1960s. This cultural movement featured the work of The Fool design collective prominently. The Fool's signature style featured highly colourful creations often drawing on Indian spiritual culture, among other influences. This trend rapidly gained international recognition, mainly thanks to its adoption by popular bands including The Beatles, Donovan, The Rolling Stones, Cream, The Jimi Hendrix Experience, and Procol Harum.

The Fool SG remains a significant and highly valuable guitar and, alongside George Harrison's "Rocky" guitar, it is one of the few original instruments of the British psychedelic music period to have survived relatively intact.

Most recently, The Fool was a central exhibit in the "Play It Loud" exhibition co-sponsored by The Metropolitan Museum of Art and the Rock and Roll Hall of Fame at the Metropolitan Museum in 2019, where it was exhibited alongside the Jack Bruce Bass VI that had also been painted by Koger and Posthuma.

== Woman tone ==
The Fool is an essential part of what Clapton called the "woman tone", "a sweet sound ... more like the human voice than the guitar". Clapton demonstrated the Woman Tone in a videotaped interview in 1968 included in the BBC movie from their final Royal Albert Hall farewell concerts, using The Fool SG and a Marshall amplifier; he said it is accomplished by turning the tone way down and the volume full up, and it is exemplified in the opening and the guitar solo of "Sunshine of Your Love".

== See also ==
- Blackie (guitar)
- Brownie (guitar)
- List of guitars
