= Foolish (disambiguation) =

Being foolish means failing to act within reason.

Foolish may also refer to:

- "Foolish" (Ashanti song), 2002
- "Foolish" (Rebecca Black song), 2017
- "Foolish" (Shawty Lo song), 2008
- "Foolish" (Tyler James song), 2004
- "Foolish", a 2010 song by Shayne Ward from Obsession
- "Foolish", a 2025 song by AJ Mitchell
- Foolish (album), a 1994 album by Superchunk
- Foolish (film), a 1999 film
  - Foolish (soundtrack), soundtrack to the 1999 film
- Foolish Lake, a lake in California

== See also ==
- Fool (disambiguation)
- Folly (disambiguation)
- FoolishPeople, a British theatre and production collective
