= The Kik =

Dutch band

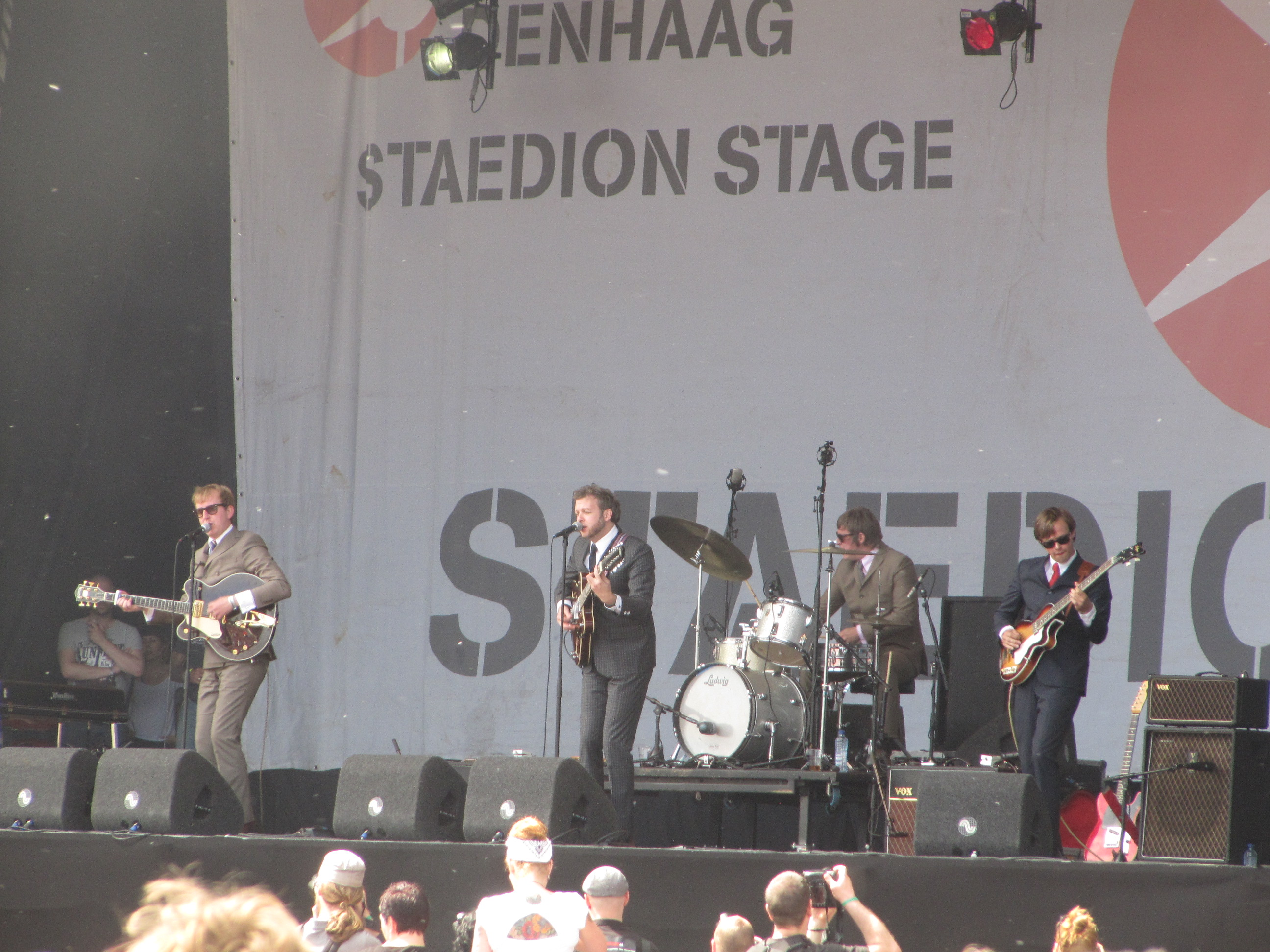
The Kik at Parkpop 2013

The Kik is a Dutch music group notable for paying homage to 1960s-era Beat music with Dutch lyrics ("Nederbeat"). They released their debut CD in May 2012 and quickly received national attention.

== History ==
The group was founded in 2010 by Rotterdammer Dave von Raven (formerly of The Madd, a Nederbeat-inspired band with English lyrics), and released two singles in English in 2011 before switching to lyrics in Dutch in which, according to a critic for NU.nl, they combine camp with sincerity. They released their first album in 2012, Springlevend. A reviewer for de Volkskrant commented on the humorous and upbeat lyrics (mostly about girls), and singled out an adaptation of "Pleasant Valley Sunday", a hit for The Monkees in 1967. A reviewer for De Telegraaf said, "Their enthusiasm is contagious, their authentic-sounding Beatles-beats are fantastic."

The Kik were announced as the house band for the Dutch television show De Wereld Draait Door, for twelve episodes of the 2013 season; they performed on the show in May 2012 to promote Springlevend.

In 2019 they made a tribute to Boudewijn de Groot's Voor de Overlevenden & Picknick.

== Members ==
- Dave von Raven – guitar, vocals
- Marcel Groenewegen – bass
- Arjan Spies – guitar, vocals
- Ries Doms – drums
- Paul Zoontjens – keyboards, backing vocals

== Discography ==
- Springlevend (2012)
- 2 (2014)
- Met De Deur in Huis (2015)
- Armand & The Kik (2015)
- Wij Zijn Vuilnisman (2016)
- Stad en Land (2017)
- Hertaalt! (2017)
- Boudewijn de Groot's Voor de Overlevenden & Picknick (2019, live)
- Jin (2020)
