= The Vaughns =

Indie rock band from New Jersey, US

- Origin: Springfield, New Jersey, U.S.
- Genres: Indie rock
- Years active: 2014–present
- Members: Anna Lies; Ryan Kenter; Jordan Smith; Brian Hughes

The Vaughns are an indie pop rock band from New Jersey.

== History ==
The Vaughns are an indie rock band from Springfield, New Jersey that formed in 2014. The band members attended high school together and began rehearsing at the suggestion of a mutual friend.

=== The Vaughns and tomfoolery (2014–2017) ===
The Vaughns released their debut EP, entitled The Vaughns, in August 2014. Their second EP, tomfoolery, was released in October 2015. The band stated that the main goal in recording tomfoolery was "to capture our live sound". In 2016, the Vaughns’ music was featured on the MTV show Brothers Green Eat and on the syndicated radio show Little Steven’s Underground Garage.

=== Singles and FOMO (2017–2019) ===
The single "Santa Cruz" was released in 2017 and premiered in Consequence of Sound. In 2018, the song "Coffee Sundae" was released, described as "a whimsical track [that] chronicles dealing with a romantic partner who is still in contact with their ex". Prior to their debut album, The Vaughns released two additional singles, "50%" and "Shout".

Their debut album, FOMO, was released independently in May 2019. The Vaughns toured in support of the record and recorded a live session with Audiotree in Chicago. Later that year, they opened for Brian Fallon of The Gaslight Anthem at Irving Plaza in New York City and performed at WXPN’s XPoNential Festival.

=== Equal Vision and rom-coms + take-out (2020–2021) ===
In 2020, The Vaughns signed with Equal Vision Records and released their third EP, rom-coms + take-out, the following year. The band worked at Headroom Studios with producer Joe Reinhart (Hop Along, Algernon Cadwallader, Beach Bunny). The three-song EP was centered around the single "Raina", which premiered on Brooklyn Vegan and was described as a "a lyrically sweet, honest love song from Anna to her partner Raina". The track was also featured on Spotify’s "Fresh Finds Indie" playlist.

=== Egg Everything (2023) ===
The Vaughns released their second full-length album, Egg Everything, in September 2023 on Equal Vision Records. Atwood Magazine described it as "an inventive, impassioned, and achingly emotive sophomore album". The single "Day by Day" was featured on Rolling Stone's "Songs You Need to Know" list. In December 2023, The Vaughns supported Born Without Bones on the 10-year anniversary tour of Baby.

== Current Members ==
- Anna Lies – vocals, guitar and synth (2014–present)
- Ryan Kenter – drums and percussion (2014–present)
- Jordan Smith – guitar and vocals (2019-present)
- Brian Hughes – bass and vocals (2020-present)

== Past Members ==
- Dave Cacciatore – guitar and vocals (2014-2019)
- Tom Losito – bass and vocals (2014-2019)

== Discography ==
Albums

- "Egg Everything" (2023)
- FOMO (2019)

EPs

- rom coms + take out (2021)
- tomfoolery (2015)
- The Vaughns (2014)
