= Apple Boutique =

Former store in London owned by the Beatles

Coordinates: 51°31′13″N 0°9′24″W

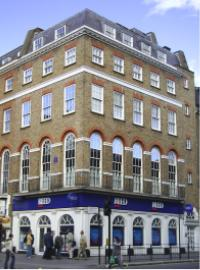
- The modern building at 94 Baker Street today
- Company type: Private company
- Industry: Retail (boutique)
- Founded: 7 December 1967; 58 years ago
- Founder: The Beatles
- Defunct: 31 July 1968; 57 years ago
- Fate: Dissolved
- Headquarters: London, United Kingdom
- Key people: Pete Shotton; Jenny Boyd
- Products: Clothing
- Owner: Apple Corps
- Website: applecorpsltd.com#/store

The Apple Boutique was a retail store located in a building on the corner of Baker Street and Paddington Street, Marylebone, London. It opened on 7 December 1967 and closed on 31 July 1968. The shop was one of the first business ventures by the Beatles' fledgling Apple Corps.

== Concept ==
The concept of the shop was that everything in it was for sale. The aim, as described by Paul McCartney, was to create "a beautiful place where beautiful people can buy beautiful things". In practice, the stock was overwhelmingly fashion garments and accessories. John Lennon vetoed the use of the word "boutique", but the venture has come to be popularly called the "Apple Boutique".

== Opening ==
The launch party on 5 December 1967 was attended by Lennon, George Harrison and their wives, as well as Eric Clapton, Richard Lester, Jack Bruce, Cilla Black and Kenneth Tynan, who were all sipping apple juice as the shop had no alcohol licence. Invitations read "Come at 7.46. Fashion Show at 8.16." suggesting a degree of precision and planning not subsequently realised in the management of the business. Footage of the event shows Simon Posthuma playing Arabic music on a flute, Barry Finch playing a small drum, and Josje Leeger playing finger cymbals to the guests. A free gift of an Apple money clip was given to the first 50 guests.

Lennon's friend Peter Shotton managed the store with Harrison's wife Pattie Boyd's sister Jenny Boyd (who later married Mick Fleetwood of Fleetwood Mac). The Apple shop was a financial disaster, because theft was endemic and customers helped themselves to the stock, as did staff members, who had difficulty determining which things people had come in with and which they had picked up in the shop. The ethos of the venture and those operating it was antithetic to making accusations of shoplifting or calling for the London Police. The Fool's members also made a habit of taking their choice of the merchandise.

== Mural ==
The Dutch designers Simon Posthuma and Marijke Koger, along with artist Josje Leeger, had met Simon Hayes and Barry Finch in London and formed the Fool design collective. Pattie Harrison was familiar with them and introduced them to the Beatles who, in September 1967, gave the Fool £100,000 (equivalent to £1,593,000 in 2025) to design and stock the first outlet of a planned national chain of "Apple" shops. The Beatles business took a lease on 94 Baker Street, a Georgian townhouse dating from 1795, and the ground floor was proposed for the Apple shop despite the location being remote from the centres of fashion and design of 1960s London, while the first Apple Corps offices operated on the upper floors.

Barry Finch employed art students to paint a psychedelic style mural, designed by the Fool, across the building's facades between 10 and 12 November 1967. The concept was borrowed from the painting of the facades of the Lord John shop in Carnaby Street, albeit executed to a figurative design with greater density and colour.

Westminster City Council had not, however, granted consent for the mural, which could have been construed as an advertisement, nor had a licence to do this been sought from the landlord, the Portman Estate. Complaints from local traders resulted in the Council issuing Apple with an enforcement notice to paint over the façade mural. In addition, the Portman Estate was prevailed upon to enforce the terms of the lease.

Between 15 and 18 May 1968 the façades were duly painted white with the word "Apple" in cursive script painted on each fascia. This transformation and shift in style from the florid "psychedelia" of the original mural to the minimalism of the "approved" scheme prefigures the contrast in record cover design between that of Sgt. Pepper's Lonely Hearts Club Band released in June 1967 and that of The Beatles to be released in November 1968.

In an interview conducted for The Beatles Anthology, George Harrison said of the artwork:

"If they'd protected it and the painted wall was there now, they would be saying, 'Wow, look at this. We've got to stop it chipping off.' But that's just typical of the narrow minds we were trying to fight against. That's what the whole Sixties Flower-Power thing was about: 'Go away, you bunch of boring people.' The whole government, the police, the public – everybody was so boring, and then suddenly people realised they could have fun. Once we were told we had to get rid of the painting, the whole thing started to lose its appeal."

== Failure and closing ==
The retail business lost money at an alarming rate, eventually running to £200,000 (equivalent to £3,059,000 in 2025) and the shop was closed on 31 July 1968. In a press release, explaining the Beatles' motives for closing the stores, Paul McCartney stated.

"We decided to close down our Baker Street shop yesterday and instead of putting up a sign saying, 'Business will be resumed as soon as possible', and then auction off the goods, we decided to give them away. The shops were doing fine and making a nice profit on turnover. So far, the biggest loss is in giving the things away, but we did that deliberately. We're giving them away—rather than selling them to barrow boys—because we wanted to give rather than sell. We came into shops by the tradesman's entrance but we're leaving by the front door. Originally, the shops were intended to be something else, but they just became like all the boutiques in London. They just weren't our thingy. The staff will get three weeks' pay but if they wish they'll be absorbed into the rest of Apple. Everyone will be cared for. ... All that's happened is that we've closed our shop in which we feel we shouldn't, in the first place, have been involved. Our main business is entertainment—communication. Apple is mainly concerned with fun, not with frocks. We want to devote all our energies to records, films and our electronics adventures. We had to re-focus. We had to zoom in on what we really enjoy, and we enjoy being alive, and we enjoy being Beatles."

The night before the closing, the Beatles, their wives and girlfriends came to take what they wanted. The next morning it was announced that all the remaining stock was to be given away on the basis of one item per person. In an interview for The Beatles Anthology, Harrison describes the event: "We ended up giving the contents away. We put an ad in the paper and we filmed people coming in and grabbing everything." Word spread quickly and the shop was empty within hours. The public, numbering in the hundreds, nearly rioted trying to get their share and the police attended.

The 18th-century house was demolished sometime between October 1969 and January of 1972 and replaced with Travelscene House, 94 Baker Street, London W1U 6FZ. This is an office building, taller than the original building, with incorrectly proportioned neo-Georgian facades that pastiche the main facade of the original building, and forming part of a controversial redevelopment of the historic urban block to north and east.

A Heritage Foundation blue plaque commemorating John Lennon's involvement with the shop was unveiled at the building on 27 April 2003. This was replaced on 17 March 2013 by a plaque noting both Lennon's and George Harrison's involvement with the store.

On 31 July 2008, a recreation of the "Apple Boutique" mural was projected onto the building by BBC programme Newsnight to mark the 40th anniversary of the shop's closure. This was part of Newsnight's series marking the 40th anniversary of 1968 and brought together Pattie Boyd, Beatles' friend Tony Bramwell, and Sixties actress, and later fashion designer, Edina Ronay to recall the controversial and eccentric Apple Boutique.

== See also ==
- Dandie Fashions
