= Welterusten mijnheer de president =

1966 Dutch-language Dylanesque protest song

- 7" vinyl single cover

Single by Boudewijn de Groot

from the album Boudewijn de Groot
- Language: Dutch
- English title: Sleep well, Mr. President
- Released: February 26, 1966
- Recorded: 1965
- Genre: Folk; Nederpop
- Length: 2:30
- Label: Decca
- Songwriters: Boudewijn de Groot; Lennaert Nijgh

Boudewijn de Groot singles chronology
"Een meisje van 16" (1965)	"Welterusten mijnheer de president" (1966)	"Ken je dat land]" (1966)

"Welterusten mijnheer de president" (Dutch: Sleep well, Mr. President) is a 1966 Dutch-language Dylanesque protest song, sung by Boudewijn de Groot. Like most of his other songs, it was co-written by songwriter Lennaert Nijgh. The music was composed by Boudewijn de Groot himself. The song is a protest against the war in Vietnam and the US president of the time, Lyndon B. Johnson and solidified De Groot as a protest singer.

== See also ==
- List of anti-war songs
