= The Picnic =

The Picnic may refer to:

- The Picnic (Tissot) or Holyday, an 1876 painting by James Tissot

== Film ==
- The Picnic (1930 film), a Mickey Mouse cartoon
- The Picnic (1976 film), a Two Ronnies television film
- The Picnic, a 2012 short silent film

== Literature ==
- "The Picnic", a 1930 short story by Walter de la Mare
- The Picnic (novel), a 1937 novel by Martin Boyd
- The Picnic, a 1988 novel by Terrance Dicks

== Television ==
=== Episodes ===
- "The Picnic" (The Amazing World of Gumball), a 2011 episode
- "The Picnic", episode four of Andy Pandy (2002)
- "The Picnic" (As Time Goes By), a 1992 episode
- "The Picnic", a 2006 episode of ChuckleVision
- "The Picnic", a 1961 episode of The Flintstones
- "The Picnic", a 1970 episode of Green Acres
- "The Pic-Nic", episode thirteen of Iznogoud, 1995
- "The Picnic", a 1998 episode of Keeping Mum
- "The Picnic", a 1999 episode of Kipper
- "The Picnic", a 1965 episode of Meet the Wife
- "The Picnic", a 1986 episode of Mother and Son
- "The Picnic", a 1997 episode of Red Shoe Diaries
- "The Picnic", episode one of the Shaun the Sheep Mossy Bottom Shorts series, 2012
- "The Picnic", a 1954 episode of Topper
- "The Picnic", a 1978 episode of Two's Company (British)
- "The Picnic" (Wander Over Yonder), a 2013 episode
- "The Picnic", a 1973 episode of The Wombles (1973)
- "The Picnic", an episode of the Indian series Dhoom Machaao Dhoom

=== Shows ===
- The Picnic, a 1989 television film, part of the Screen Two series

== See also ==
- Picnic (disambiguation)
