= Tomfoolery =

Tomfoolery is another word for silliness. It can also refer to:

- Tomfoolery (EP), 2015 extended play
- Tomfoolery (film), 1936 film
- Tomfoolery (musical), 1980–1981 musical revue
- The Tomfoolery Show, 1970–1971 animated comedy series
