= Jameszoo =

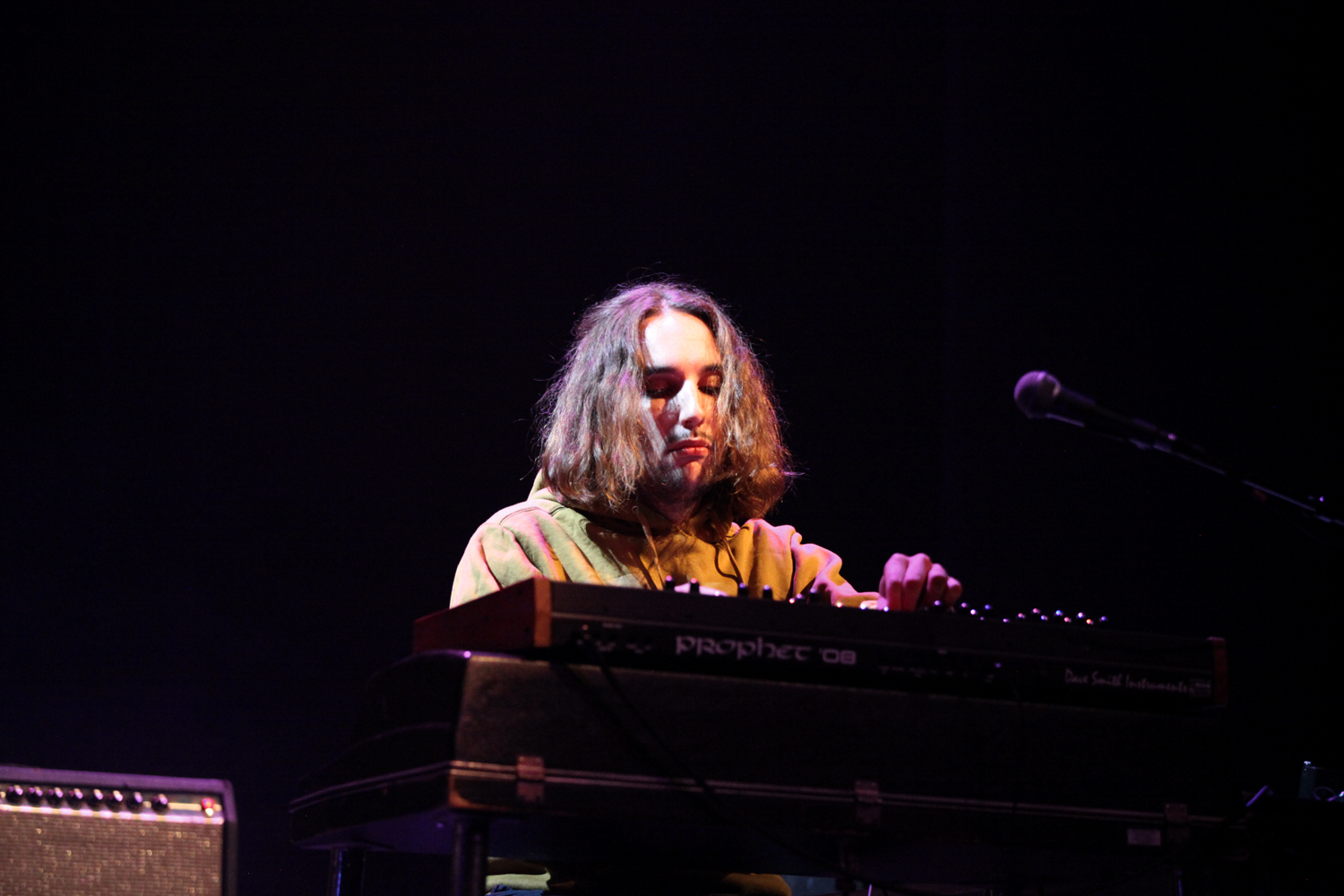
- Dinther at Elevate Festival 2013

Background information
- Born: Mitchel van Dinther; Den Bosch, Netherlands
- Origin: 's-Hertogenbosch, Netherlands
- Genres: Jazz; Experimental; Electronic
- Occupation: Producer
- Labels: Brainfeeder; Rwina Records; Kindred Spirits
- Website: Official Website

Mitchel van Dinther, better known by his stage name Jameszoo, is a Dutch record producer from 's-Hertogenbosch, Netherlands.

== Life and career ==
Dinther started as a DJ in his hometown of 's-Hertogenbosch, Netherlands. In May 2013, he attended the Red Bull Music Academy in New York City where he was able to meet and collaborate with people in contrast to how he described his origin as "this small town where there's no one doing what I was trying to do, you're not really sure if it's an actual thing you're doing".

After releasing several EPs and being signed to Brainfeeder, Dinther released his first album Fool in May 2016.

His latest album, Blind, was released in March 2022. AllMusic described it as "the album itself is fascinating in how far it pushes and deconstructs musical ideas while still retaining soul and spirit".

== Style and influences ==
Jameszoo describes his music as "naive computer jazz" to leave as much judgement to the listener as possible. Fool was written very similarly with simple personal connections, such as 'Flu' and 'Soup' being named so because he was ill during its production, though he still wants to leave interpretation up to the listener.

Dinther cites Brazilian music as a strong influence, such as composer Arthur Verocai (who later became involved with the production of Fool). When discussing the balance and mixing of electronic and acoustic elements to his music, he notes Herbie Hancock and his album Sextant saying that "he completely nailed it".

== Discography ==
=== Studio albums ===
- Fool (Brainfeeder, 2016)
- Melkweg (Brainfeeder, 2019) with Metropole Orchestra
- Blind (Brainfeeder, 2022)
- Music for 17 Musicians (Brainfeeder, 2025) with Asko|Schönberg

=== EPs ===
- Leaf People / Krishnan Feathers (Kindred Spirits, 2011)
- Guanyin Psittacines (Kindred Spirits, 2012)
- Faaveelaa (Rwina, 2012)
- Jheronimus (Rwina, 2013)
- Flake EP (Brainfeeder, 2017)

=== Singles ===
- "Leaf People / Krishnan Feathers" (2011)
- "(rolrolrol)" (2019)
