= The Fool (design collective) =

Dutch design collective and band

The Fool were a Dutch design collective and band in the psychedelic style of art in British popular music in the late 1960s. They worked closely with The Beatles in London, painting George Harrison's Mini car, John Lennon's piano and a three story high psychedelic mural on the outside of the Apple Boutique on Baker Street (since painted over). The group was named in reference to the Fool tarot card.

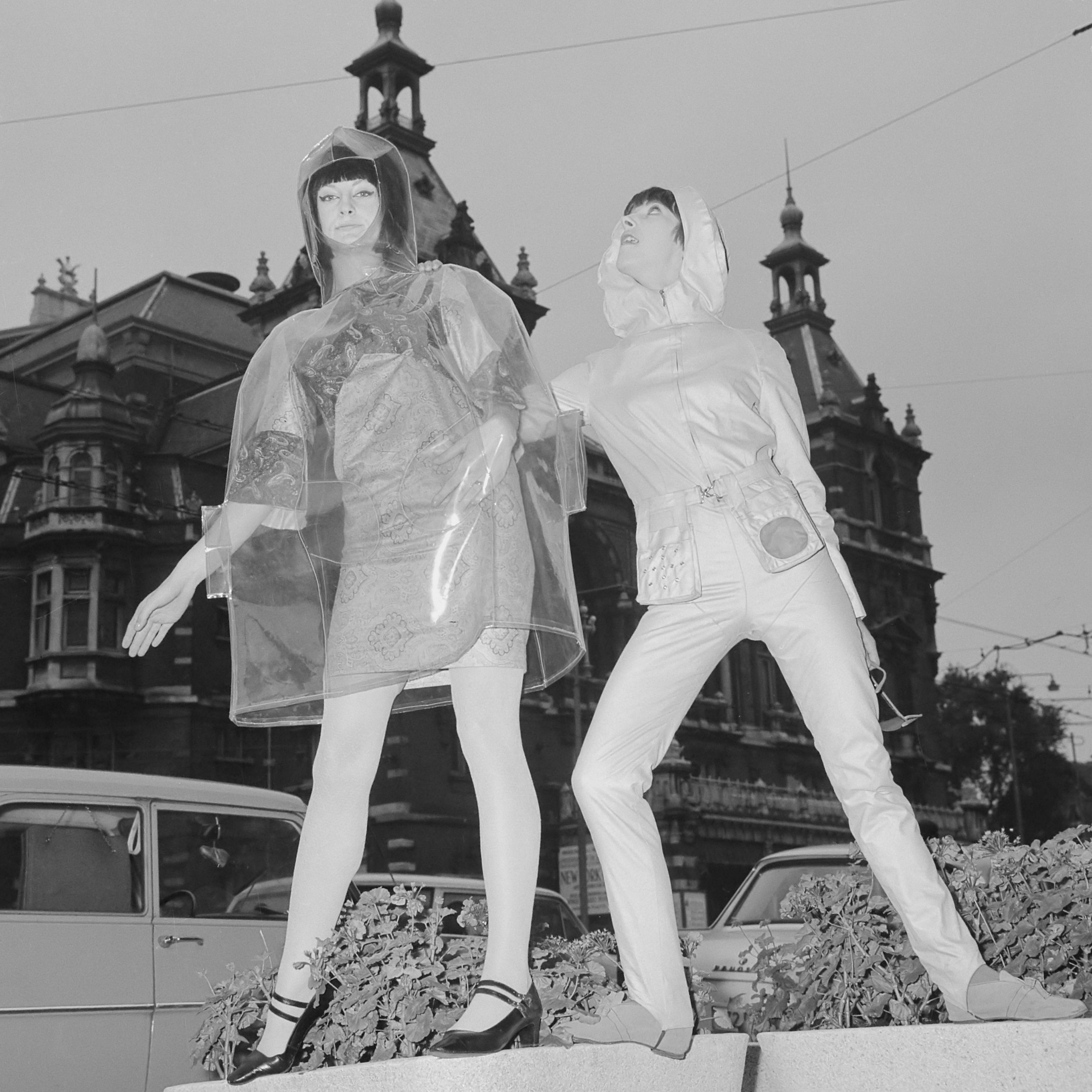
Josje Leeger and Marijke Koger (1965)

The original members were Dutch artists Simon Posthuma (1 February 1939 – 28 February 2020) and Marijke Koger (born 6 November 1943), who were discovered by photographer Karl Ferris among the hippie community on the Spanish island of Ibiza in 1966. He took photographs of clothes they designed, and sent them to London where they were published in The Times. Ferris took The Fool back to London, and together they opened a studio, with the Dutch artists producing clothes and art, and Ferris pursuing photography. Barry Finch (10 April 1943 - 11 May 2021), a maverick public relations man in the music scene, discovered the couple's talents and working for Brian Epstein got them their first designer deals in the industry. When the offers kept coming, Marijke Koger insisted that Josje Leeger (25 September 1943 - 4 July 1991), her best friend and a fashion designer with whom she had collaborated in Amsterdam, come over to join the two. Barry and Yosha Finch became a couple and so The Fool was born.

== Works ==
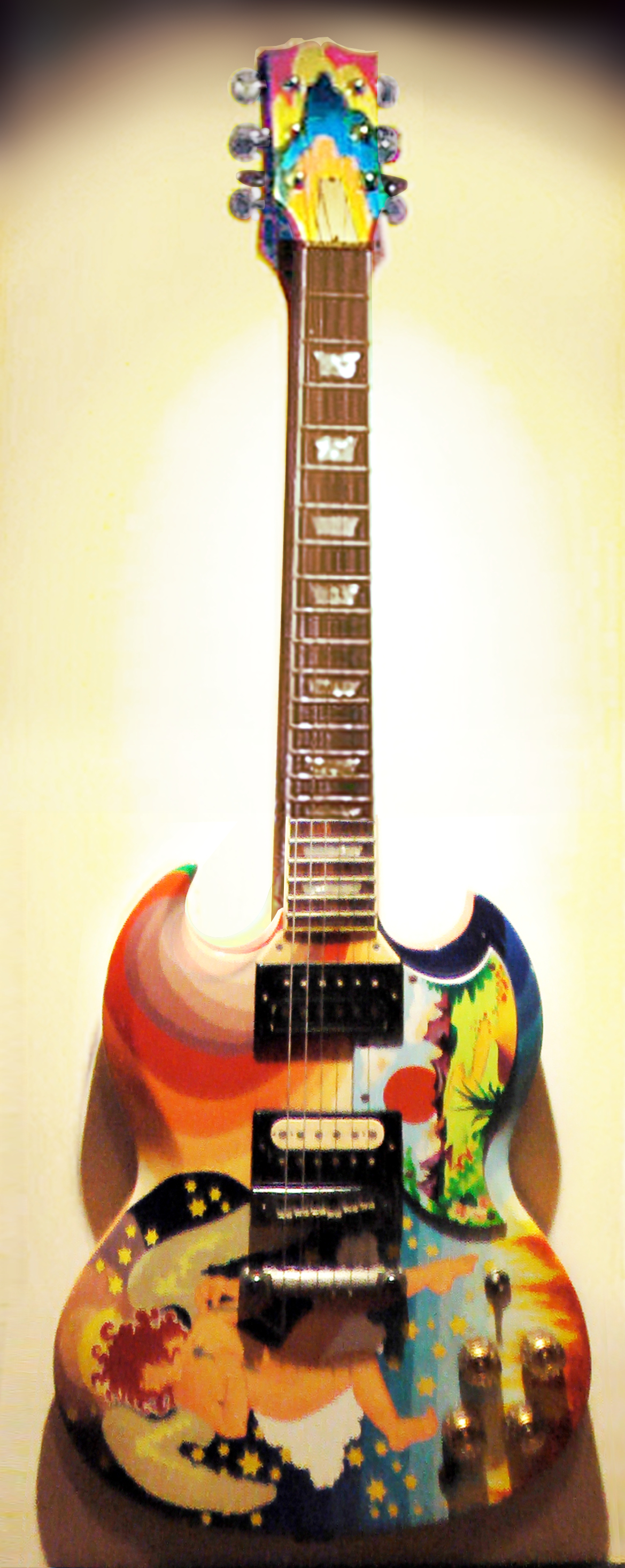
A replica of The Fool guitar exhibited at HRC San Antonio

Their work includes:

- the colourful clothes worn by the Hollies on the cover of their 1967 album Evolution;
- stage costumes and the front cover design for the self-titled 1968 debut LP Move by the Move;
- stage costumes for Procol Harum;
- the cover of the Incredible String Band's 1967 LP The 5000 Spirits or the Layers of the Onion;
- cover art for Boudewijn de Groot's 1968 Psych-folk LP Picknick (credited to Simon & Marijke);
- stage costumes and decoration to instruments used by Cream, including Eric Clapton's famed Gibson SG guitar (also named The Fool), Jack Bruce's Fender Bass VI bass, and Ginger Baker's drum kit, created for the group's 1967 tour of the US.
- several illustrations in the magazine Oz

The Fool's best known artworks are those they created for the Beatles in 1966–67. They include:

- the clothes worn in the 1967 television broadcast of "All You Need Is Love";
- the clothes worn in the "I Am the Walrus" segment of the 1967 Magical Mystery Tour television film;
- the three-storey mural painted in psychedelic colours on the facade of the Beatles' Apple Boutique in London's Baker Street (which also stocked their creations; months later, the mural was painted over by civic order, due to protests from other local businesses, before the shop failed);
- decoration to John Lennon's piano and one of his Gibson acoustic guitars;
- decoration to George Harrison's Mini car and his bungalow Kinfauns in Surrey, as well as several of Harrison's guitars, but not his Fender Stratocaster known as "Rocky" which Harrison painted himself;
- the set design for Joe Massot's 1968 movie Wonderwall;
- the graphics in the disc-inner sleeve of the 1967 Sgt. Pepper's Lonely Hearts Club Band LP.

After moving to Los Angeles, the Fool created the largest mural in the world at the time (1968) on the exterior of the Aquarius Theatre for a production of the Broadway musical Hair, by invitation of producer Michael Butler. Simon and Marijke went on to paint other theaters where Hair was playing, in San Francisco, Seattle and Chicago. Thereafter, The Fool split up, Simon, Barry and Josje eventually going back to Amsterdam while Marijke remained in Los Angeles to continue her artistic endeavors.

== Musical career ==
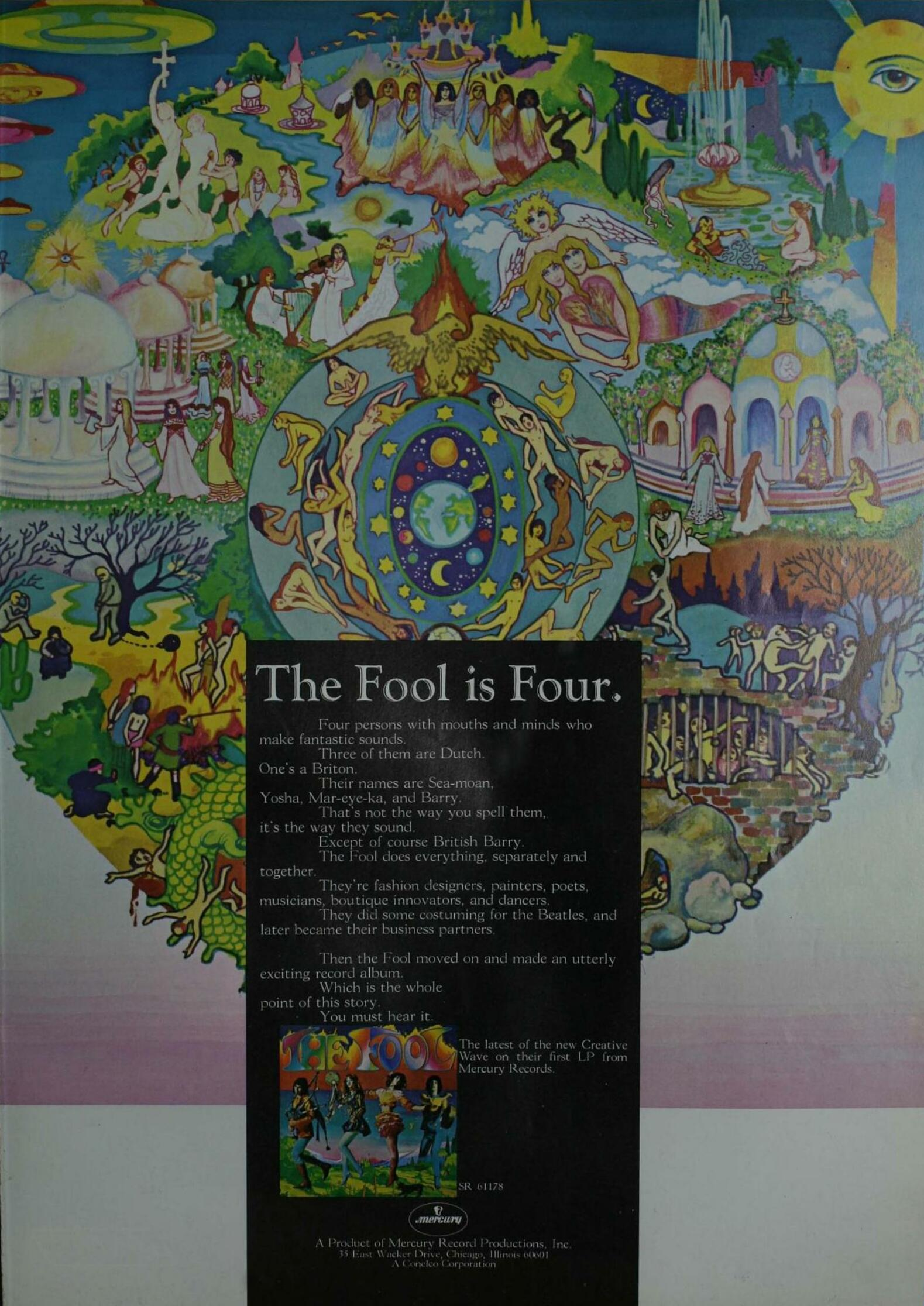
Trade advert for The Fool (1968)

The Fool also released an eponymous album The Fool in 1968, in the psychedelic folk style, produced by Graham Nash. It was re-released in 2005.

As Seemon & Marijke they released another album called Son of America on A & M records, also produced by Graham Nash, in collaboration with Booker T. Jones, in 1969. Backing vocals were provided by Joni Mitchell, Rita Coolidge, Morreen Thornton and Colleen Fortune. Their second single "I saw you" was a hit in the Netherlands in 1972.

Seemon & Marijke recorded a third album called Mediterranean Blues produced by Booker T. Jones in his Homegrown Studio in 1972.

- The Fool as The Fool (1968)
- "Rainbow Man" (USA single), as The Fool (1969)
- "Shining Light" (USA single), as The Fool (1969)
- Son of America (album), as Seemon & Marijke (1971)
- "I Saw You" (single), as Seemon & Marijke (1971)
- "Keep on Keepin' On" (single), as Seemon & Marijke (1972)
- "Vegetable Stew" / "Roselie" (single), as Seemon & Marijke (1972)
- "Dreamboat" / "I Saw t in the Street" (single), as Seemon & Marijke (1974)

== Personal life ==
Simon Posthuma's son, Douwe Bob, is a Dutch singer-songwriter who represented the Netherlands in the Eurovision Song Contest 2016. Simon died on 28 February 2020, aged 81, having been suffering from Korsakoff syndrome for some years.
