= Fools Peak =

Mountain in Colorado, United States

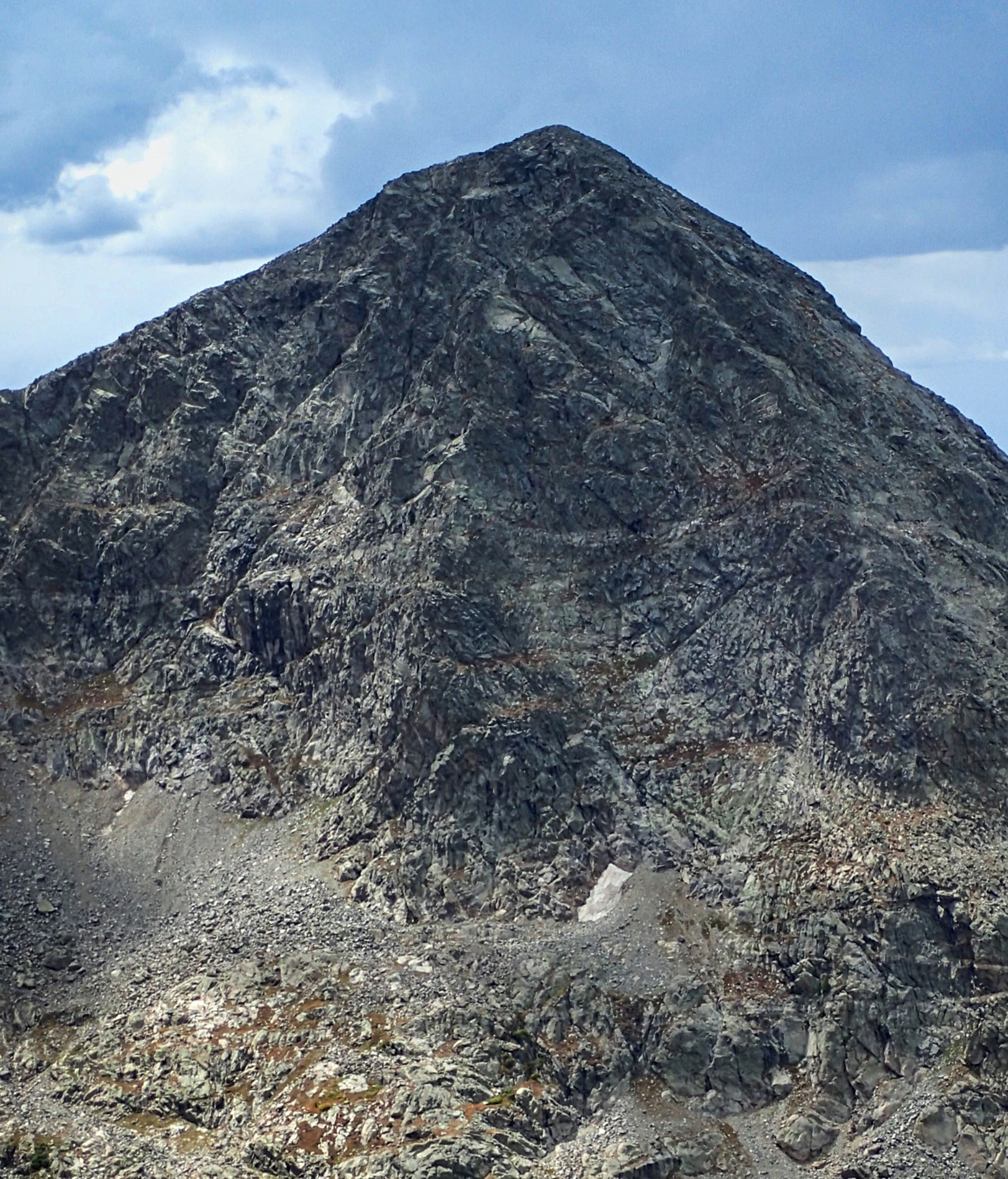
- Northeast aspect

Highest point
- Elevation: 12,954 ft (3,948 m)
- Prominence: 615 ft (187 m)
- Isolation: 1.28 mi (2.06 km)
- Coordinates: 39°27′03″N 106°35′58″W

Geography
- Location within Colorado Location within the United States
- Country: United States
- State: Colorado
- County: Eagle
- Protected area: Holy Cross Wilderness
- Parent range: Rocky Mountains; Sawatch Range
- Topo map: USGS Mount Jackson

Climbing
- Easiest route: class 2

Fools Peak is a 12,954-foot-elevation (3,948-meter) summit in Eagle County, Colorado, United States.

== Description ==
Fools Peak is located in the Sawatch Range and is set in the Holy Cross Wilderness, on land managed by White River National Forest. Precipitation runoff from the mountain's south slope drains into Lime Creek which is a tributary of the Fryingpan River, whereas the north slope drains into East Brush Creek → Brush Creek → Eagle River. Topographic relief is significant as the summit rises 1,650 feet (503 m) above Mystic Island Lake in one-half mile (0.8 km) and 2,900 feet (884 m) above Lime Creek in 1.1 mile (1.8 km). An ascent of the summit involves hiking 6.5 miles (one way) and 4,340 feet of total elevation gain. The North Ridge is considered one of the best ridge scrambles in Colorado. The mountain's toponym has been officially adopted by the United States Board on Geographic Names, and has been reported in publications since at least 1923.

== Climate ==
According to the Köppen climate classification system, Fools Peak is located in an alpine subarctic climate zone with cold, snowy winters, and cool to warm summers. Due to its altitude, it receives precipitation all year, as snow in winter and as thunderstorms in summer, with a dry period in late spring. Climbers can expect afternoon rain, hail, and lightning from the seasonal monsoon in late July and August.
