= Boudewijn de Groot =

Dutch musician (born 1944)

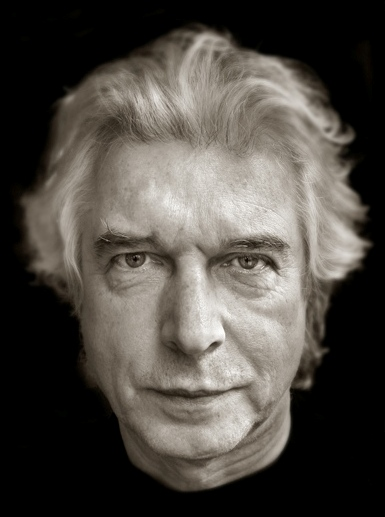
- de Groot in 2007

Background information
- Born: Frank Boudewijn de Groot; 20 May 1944 (age 82); Batavia, Dutch East Indies
- Genre: Folk
- Instruments: Vocals, guitar
- Years active: 1964–present
- Labels: Decca; Philips; Mercury; Universal Music Group
- Website: boudewijndegroot.nl

Frank Boudewijn de Groot (Dutch pronunciation: [ˈbʌudəʋɛin də ˈɣroːt]; born 20 May 1944) is a Dutch singer-songwriter, known for "Welterusten mijnheer de president" (1966).

== Biography ==
=== Youth ===
Boudewijn de Groot was born in wartime occupied Dutch East Indies in 1944 in a Japanese concentration camp close to Batavia (today known as Jakarta) where his mother died in June 1945. In 1946, he and his family returned to the Netherlands. De Groot's father, however, was obliged to return to Indonesia, so De Groot went to stay with his aunt in Haarlem. In 1951, his father came back and in 1952, the family moved, with his new stepmother, to Heemstede. De Groot lived in Heemstede in the same street as one of his future lyricists, Lennaert Nijgh, who was a friend of De Groot's stepbrother.

=== Early years in music ===
In 1960, De Groot met Nijgh at the Coornhert Lyceum in Haarlem. At that time, De Groot was already singing in the style of Jaap Fischer and Jacques Brel. Lennaert Nijgh wrote his lyrics. After their high school-period they both decided to go to a film academy. In their last year, Nijgh made the short movie "Feestje Bouwen", for which De Groot wrote two songs. During one of the presentations of the movie, television journalist Ed Lautenslager became impressed with De Groot's talent, and subsequently helped him to get a contract with record label Philips. De Groot's first single, "Strand" (Beach), appeared in 1964 and led to some media attention. He followed it up with "Elegie prenatale" and "De morgen", and his recurring appearances in the television show "Kaberet Kroniek" made De Groot a minor national celebrity. The single "Noordzee" in February 1964 was a much bigger hit, but the huge breakthrough came in 1966 with Lennaert Nijgh's adaptation of a song from Charles Aznavour's "Une enfant de seize ans", retitled "Meisje van 16". This was De Groot's first song to appear in a music chart. He soon quit his job to become a full-time singer. After a while, his first album Boudewijn de Groot, recorded with the Frans de Kok orchestra, was released by record label Decca.

=== Years of fame ===
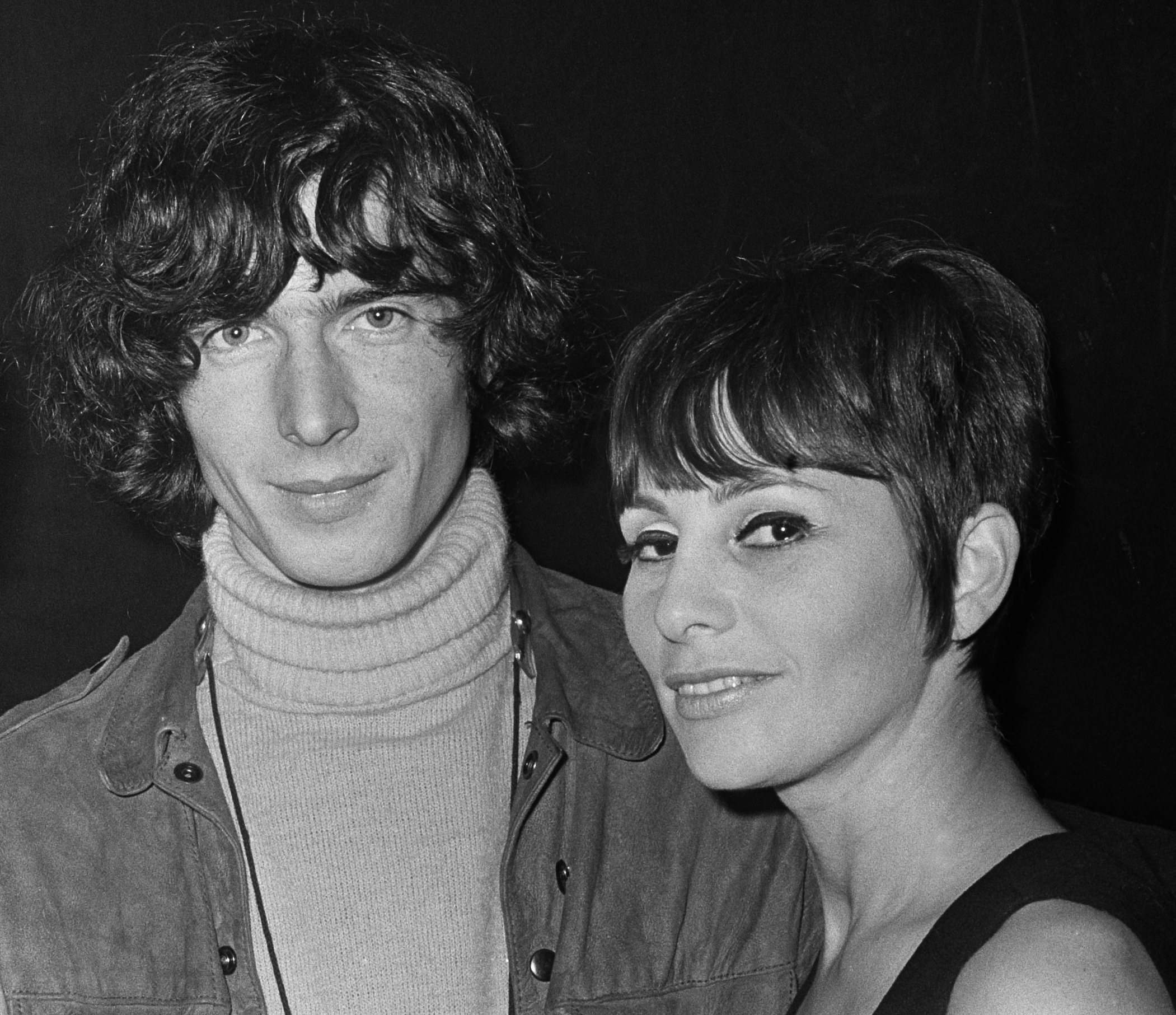
De Groot and Ann Burton (1966)

Much of Nijgh's lyrics included social criticism, so after the release of his first album in 1966 De Groot was labeled as a protest singer, an image confirmed for the mainstream audience by the success of his song Welterusten mijnheer de president ("Goodnight, Mister President") on the Vietnam War. De Groot's second album Voor de overlevenden was released later in 1966. The arranger and conductor for this album, Bert Paige, continued to work with De Groot until the 1970s. However, during carnival 1967, "Het Land van Maas en Waal" was released and became De Groot's third hit. Under the name "Baldwin", an English version of these songs appeared in the U.K. (The land at rainbow's end). The next single, "Onder ons", just made it into the charts. By this time, De Groot had already recorded songs like "Verdronken vlinder", "Testament" and "Beneden alle peil", which would later become successful but would never enter hit charts. De Groot and Nijgh became influenced by the Flower Power movement during that time and created the album Picknick. The songs sounded a lot like a mix of George Harrison's work on The Beatles albums and their own work. The album was well received, and the single "Picknick" was a hit. The duet "Meester Prikkebeen" with Elly Nieman entered the charts two months later. Two other songs, "Waterdrager" and "Als de rook om je hoofd is verdwenen" were minor hits in 1968.

=== Other work ===
In 1968, De Groot decided he didn't want to perform live anymore and stopped his collaboration with Nijgh and his band, The Names and Faces. In 1969, De Groot worked with Eelco Gelling, the guitarist of Cuby and the Blizzards and, under the name Tower, they recorded the single "In Your Life", which became a hit. After this, he started working with Lucien Duzee, and they created his fourth album Nacht en ontij. The record didn't sound like De Groot's old work, and the single didn't make it in the charts. The new singles from Tower also failed, and De Groot gave up singing. He moved to a farm in Dwingeloo. After a year, De Groot returned as the producer of Rob de Nijs and Oscar Benton.

=== Newfound fame ===
In 1971, his record label released a compilation album called Vijf jaar hits. It sold over 100,000 copies and, subsequently, De Groot frequently reappeared on the radio. Much of his old work was re-appreciated, and "Als de rook om je hoofd is verdwenen" became a hit again. Another compilation album called Dubbel twee was also released. De Groot began working with Nijgh again, and they released the album Hoe sterk is de eenzame fietser in 1973. The song "Jimmy" became his biggest hit in five years, constituting a definite comeback. De Groot received an Edison and a Gouden Harp (Dutch music awards).

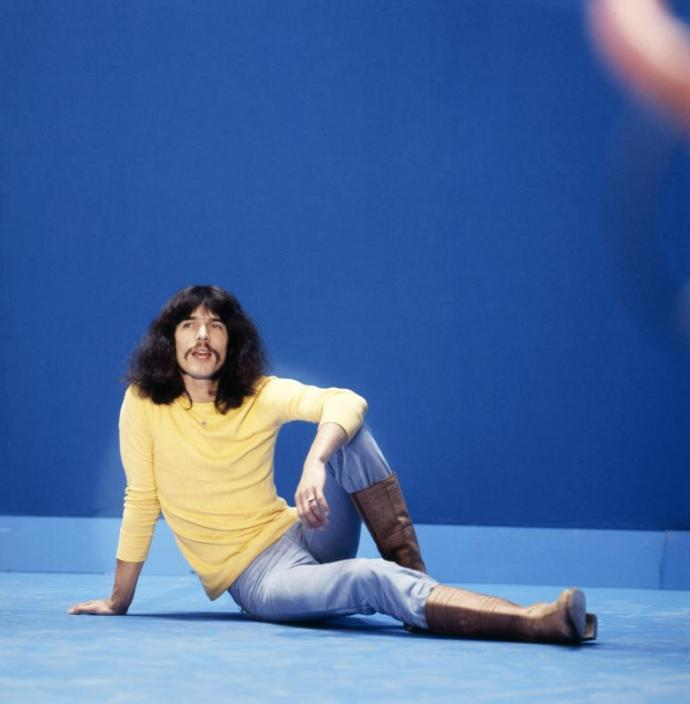
De Groot during a 1973 TV show

Meanwhile, De Groot and Nijgh had orchestrated the comeback of Rob de Nijs, writing a string of hits for him, including "Jan Klaassen de trompetter" and "Malle Babbe".

In 1975, De Groot wrote the album Waar ik woon en wie ik ben with his old classmate René Daalder. The single "Ik ben Ik" became a hit. De Groot moved to California a few months later for inspiration, and did not return until 1977. He made no new records in this period, but toured in Belgium and the Netherlands. One of the songs he wrote in California, "Annabel", became a hit for Hans de Booy. In April 1980, his new album Van een afstand was released. It contained (the single of) the title song for the movie Tip van de sluier. Neither the single nor the movie were a success, but the album won an Edison. De Groot quit in 1984 after the release of his eighth album, Maalstroom.

=== Retirement from music ===
After his retirement from music, De Groot wanted to translate, compose film music and perform when asked. He composed the music for the TV series De familie Wijntak (1986) and for the movies Lost in Amsterdam (1989), Let the Music Dance (1990) and a 1987 Dutch adaptation of the hit musical Nunsense. He acted in the musical Tjechov, where he played the lead role of Anton Chekhov and in Het dagboek van Anne Frank where he played the role of Otto Frank. Under the pseudonym "Frank de Groot", he has translated seven Stephen King novels and in 2011 Scott Turow's Presumed Innocent into Dutch.

=== Another comeback ===
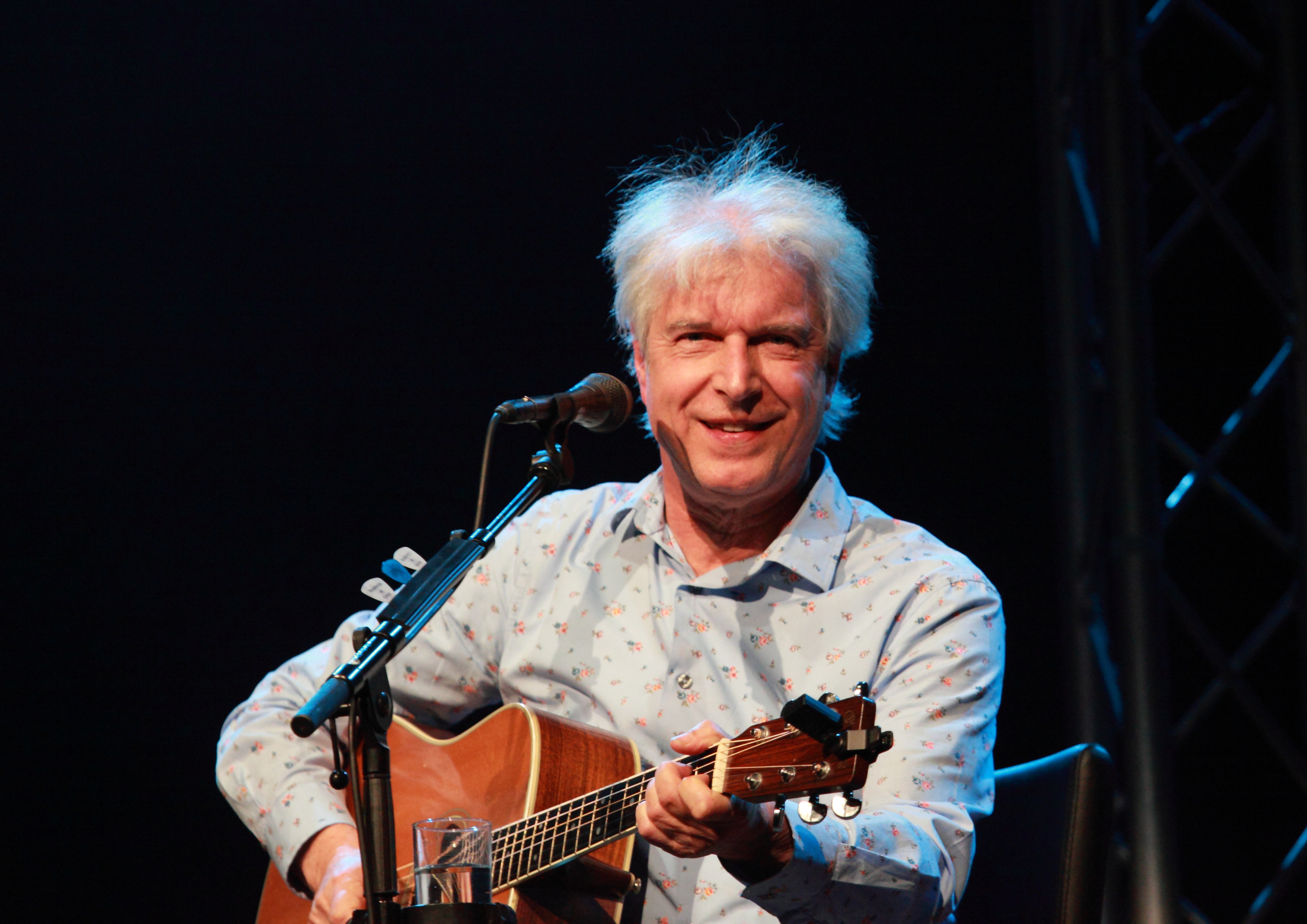
Boudewijn de Groot in 2013

In 1996, De Groot released Een Nieuwe Herfst. His new record label Mercury also released an album with old work and newly released work. De Groot started going on tour again and he reappeared in some TV-shows. He started writing non-commercial albums with Nijgh and released Een eiland in de verte in 2003. Nijgh died in 2002. On 19 January 2007 De Groot issued Lage Landen; he wrote most of the lyrics, but also used texts of Lennaert Nijgh and Freek de Jonge. The album was recorded in Nashville. On 3 February 2007 Lage Landen reached the top rankings on hit lists in the Netherlands. On 20 April 2015 De Groot issued Achter glas (Behind glass). During the tour he played songs from his post-comeback-era as well as rare older tracks.

=== Supergroup ===
In 2016 De Groot formed the supergroup Vreemde Kostgangers (Strange Boarders) with Henny Vrienten (bass-player of Doe Maar) and George Kooymans (guitarist of Golden Earring); they successfully released two albums in 2017 and did sold-out tours consisting of collective songs and solo-material.

In 2018, De Groot released Even weg; he recorded this album with The Dutch Eagles, a tribute-band playing songs by The Eagles and related artists.

=== Retirement from performing ===
On February 6, 2020, De Groot appeared on talkshow De Wereld Draait Door to announce that he'll retire from performing after one last tour with Vreemde Kostgangers. The singer made this news official on April 23, 2021, through his website. Consequently, the rescheduled dates of the tour with Vreemde Kostgangers were cancelled.

De Groot continued to record and in November 2022 he released the album Windveren, with contributions by The Kik and George Kooymans (himself retired from performing after being diagnosed ALS) as well as a long-lost piece by Lennaert Nijgh. The album was preceded by the single Aarde in which De Groot chronicled the distorted relationship between Mother Earth and mankind.

In 2023 the third and final Vreemde Kostgangers-album was released.

== Personal life ==
Boudewijn de Groot is married to Anja Bak. With his first wife he had two children Marcel and Caya, with his second wife he had a son Jim, all of whom have music- and acting careers. His granddaughter Aysha is also pursuing a career in music under the pseudonym Meis.

== Discography ==
=== Studio albums ===
- Boudewijn de Groot (1966)
- Voor de overlevenden (1966)
- Picknick (1968)
- Nacht en ontij (1969)
- Hoe sterk is de eenzame fietser (1973)
- Waar ik woon en wie ik ben (1975)
- Van een afstand (1980)
- Maalstroom (1984)
- Een nieuwe herfst (1996)
- Het eiland in de verte (2003)
- Lage Landen (2007)
- Achter glas (2015)
- Even weg (2018)
- Windveren (2022)

=== Live albums ===
- Concert (1980)
- Een hele tour (1997)
- Andere tour (2002)
- Een avond in Brussel (2005)
- Lage Landen tour 2007 (2007)

=== DVDs ===
- Tour (2001)
- Eeuwige jeugd (2005)
- Een avond in Brussel (2005)
- Lage Landen tour 2007 (2007)
