= Blackie (guitar) =

Guitar owned by Eric Clapton

Fender Stratocaster "Blackie"
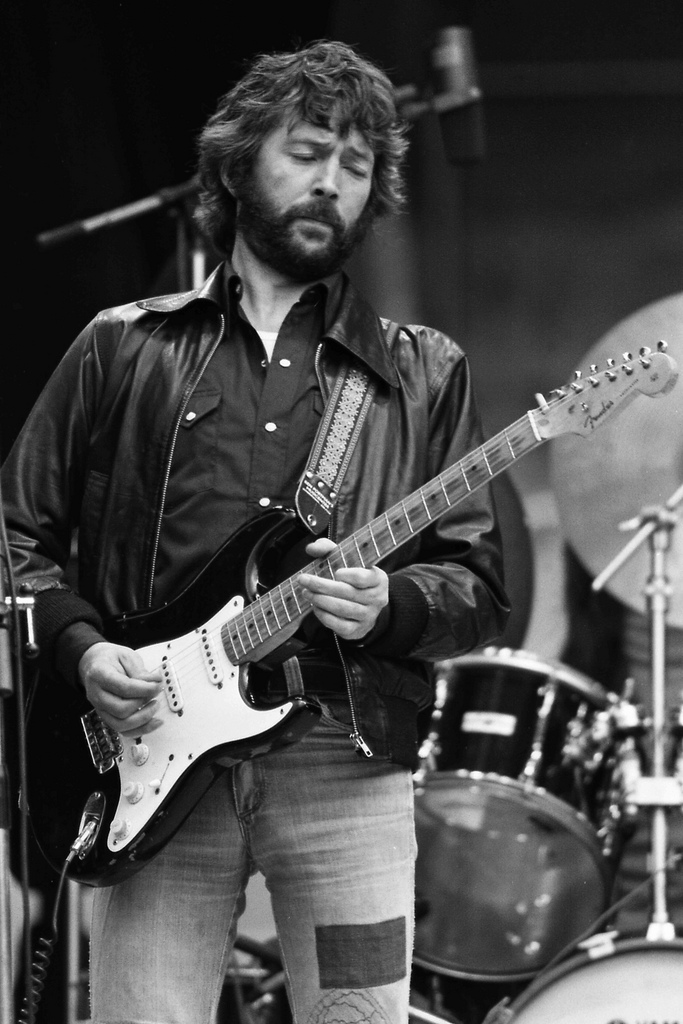
- Clapton with "Blackie" performing in 1978
- Manufacturer: Fender
- Period: Pre-CBS

Construction
- Body type: Stratocaster
- Neck joint: Bolt-on

Woods
- Body: Alder
- Neck: Maple
- Fretboard: Maple

Hardware
- Bridge: Standard Fender Synchronized
- Pickup: S-S-S

Blackie is the nickname given by Eric Clapton to his favorite Fender Stratocaster.

== Background ==
In 1970, Clapton switched from Gibson electric guitars to Fender Stratocasters, largely due to the influences of Jimi Hendrix and Blind Faith bandmate Steve Winwood. His first Stratocaster, nicknamed "Brownie" because of its sunburst brown finish, was used on his albums Eric Clapton and Layla and Other Assorted Love Songs.

The same year, Clapton found the Sho-Bud guitar shop in Nashville, Tennessee. He bought six 1950s Fender Stratocasters for two or three hundred US dollars each (roughly US$1,500–2,300 each in 2023 dollars). After giving one each to George Harrison, Pete Townshend, and Steve Winwood, he took the best parts of the remaining three (built c. 1956 and 1957) and Nashville luthier Ted Newman Jones assembled "Blackie", so named for its black finish.

Clapton first played Blackie live 13 January 1973 at the Rainbow Concert. Clapton would play Blackie for many years on and off stage (such as in his guest appearance in The Last Waltz); finally, after the Behind The Sun tour in 1985, it was retired due to issues with the neck. In 1988, the Eric Clapton Stratocaster was released, according to Clapton's specifications; he began playing his new signature model shortly after.

Blackie was seen again by the public for a 1990 television commercial for the Japanese automobile firm Honda when, at the specific request of the company, Clapton used Blackie to record a new guitar solo on "Bad Love" in New York and was filmed for the commercial doing so. Blackie was also brought out on stage for one number during the Royal Albert Hall shows in 1991. In 2019, the guitar was on display at the "Play it Loud!" exhibit at the Metropolitan Museum of Art, also featuring other instruments from iconic musicians.

== Songs recorded with "Blackie" ==
Clapton played "Blackie" almost exclusively on stage and in the studio from 1974 to 1985 recording hits such as "Cocaine", "I Shot The Sheriff", "Wonderful Tonight", "Farther Up the Road", "Lay Down Sally" and various live versions of "Layla" featured on several album covers and videos.

== World record auction ==
In 2004, Blackie was sold for $959,500 at a Christie's auction to support the Crossroads Centre, a drug and alcohol addiction rehabilitation centre founded by Clapton. The auction's winner was the music equipment chain Guitar Center, and the bid set the record for the world's most expensive guitar. In 2006, another Stratocaster—signed by a large group of celebrities, including Clapton—was auctioned to benefit the victims of the 2004 Asian tsunami, selling for $2.8 million and surpassing Blackie's record.

== Custom Shop reproduction ==
In November 2006, Fender announced a limited run of 275 Blackie reissues by the Fender Custom Shop, identical to the original. They were released on 24 November 2006 and sold out within hours. The original Blackie was exhaustively examined and measured for the reproduction. The reproduction Blackies were constructed by a team of master builders, with each of the various 275 produced being assigned to one master builder.

== See also ==
- The Fool
- Brownie
- List of guitars
