= Kluson Manufacturing Company =

Musical instrument tuning machine company

The Kluson Manufacturing Company, founded in 1925, was a prominent manufacturer of musical instrument tuning machines.

== Origin ==
The company was founded as a machine shop by John Kluson in Chicago in 1925. Kluson had previously run a machine shop for Harmony Company. Kluson Manufacturing soon found a niche making tuners for string instruments, most prominently for the Gibson Guitar Corporation, to whom they were a major supplier. They also supplied other major guitar makers such as Fender, Martin, and Rickenbacker, among others.

Kluson lost one of their most important customers in 1976 when Gibson switched to Schaller tuning machines. The company continued until 1981, when it folded.

== Revival ==
The Kluson brand was acquired by Larry Davis of WD Music Products in 1994. Under his leadership the product was reconstructed with improvements and the brand was reestablished with some of its former customers, including Gibson Guitar Corporation and Fender. Kluson-branded tuning machines are now produced in Korea by WD Music Products based in North Fort Myers, Florida. The Kluson brand was briefly licensed to TonePro Sound Labs Int'l, who produced a diecast version of the traditional Kluson-brand tuning machines.

== The brand today ==
=== Original reissues ===
Kluson has re-engineered many of the original product lines. Kluson now produces technologically improved versions of their original stamped steel tuning machines, #9 tailpiece, Waffleback tuning machines, and Gibson Firebird banjo tuning machines.

=== Expansion ===
In addition to re-engineering original catalog offerings, Kluson has also expanded to include Fender Telecaster, Fender Stratocaster, and Tune-o-matic bridges, tuning machine bushings, pickguard brackets, and other hardware made in the United States. The Kluson "Supreme" series was introduced as an 18:1 gear ratio upgrade to the original stamped steel tuning machines. A locking version of the vintage stamped steel tuning machines is also available.

=== Revolution tuning machines ===
In 2015, the Kluson brand expanded to produce a series of diecast tuning machines, the Revolution tuning machines, recognized as "Best In Show" by Guitar World after their debut at the NAMM Show.
