= Picnic (TV series) =

- Starring: Barbara Islas and Alexia Imaz.
- Country of origin: Mexico

Production
- Production locations: Telehit Studios; Mexico City, Federal District

Original release
- Network: Telehit
- Release: present

Picnic is a television talk show from the Mexican TV network Telehit, hosted by Barbara Islas and Alexia Imaz. This show features fashion tips, music, lifestyle and advise for teenagers and girls of all ages.
