= Fool (Jameszoo album) =

Studio album by Jameszoo
- Released: 13 May 2016
- Genre: Jazz
- Length: 43:26
- Label: Brainfeeder
- Producer: Mitchel van Dinther

Jameszoo chronology
Fool (2016)	Blind (2022)

Fool is the debut studio album by Dutch record producer Mitchel van Dinther under the pseudonym Jameszoo. It was released on 13 May 2016 through Brainfeeder. It received generally favorable reviews from critics.

== Background ==
Jameszoo first emerged as a DJ in the 2000s. Subsequently, he began producing music. His debut 7-inch single, "Leaf People", was released in 2011. He then released the Guanyin Psittacines EP (2012), the Faaveelaa EP (2012), and the Jheronimus EP (2013). Fool is his debut studio album.

Fool was recorded within six months. During the making of the album, Jameszoo drew inspiration from the albums by Arthur Verocai, Steve Kuhn, and Robert Wyatt. The album features guest appearances from Verocai (on "Flu") and Kuhn (on "The Zoo"). It also includes performances by multiple musicians. The album's cover art is Jameszoo's portrait painted by Philip Akkerman.

== Critical reception ==
Professional ratings
Aggregate scores
Source	Rating
Metacritic	80/100
Review scores
Source	Rating
AllMusic	3.5/5 stars
Consequence	B−
Exclaim!	9/10
Pitchfork	6.9/10
PopMatters	9/10
Record Collector	4/5 stars
Resident Advisor	4.0/5

According to the review aggregator Metacritic, Fool received "generally favorable reviews" based on a weighted average score of 80 out of 100 from 8 critic scores.

Paul Simpson of AllMusic described the album as "a playful amalgamation of influences ranging from outer-space jazz-funk to Brazilian rhythms, painstakingly crafted to sound spontaneous and unpredictable." He added, "Fool is the type of album that defies logic, moving from discordant moments to heartfelt melodies to whimsical, childlike glee within the span of minutes." Derek Staples of Consequence stated, "In true Brainfeeder-fashion, Fool is a narrative constructed through the shared ethos of experimentation in both the left-field jazz and electronic communities."

Emmanuel Elone of PopMatters commented that the album melds "Jameszoo's sonic eccentricities and experimentation with great performances, stellar musicians, and off-the-beaten-path instrumentation." Will Pearson of Exclaim! stated, "The musicianship of the guest artists is impressive, and Jameszoo's interpretations of their work are startlingly creative." He added, "The whole package is likely to be one of the year's best, and certainly one of its most original."

PopMatters placed the song "Flake" at number 44 on their year-end list of "The Best Songs of 2016".

== Track listing ==
Fool track listing
No.	Title	Writer(s)	Length
1.	"Flake"	Mitchel van Dinther; Niels Broos	3:51
2.	"Lose"	Dinther	4:07
3.	"Soup"	Dinther	4:01
4.	"Flu" (featuring Arthur Verocai)	Dinther; Broos	5:08
5.	"Wrong"	Dinther	3:37
6.	"Meat"	Dinther; August Rosenbaum	4:53
7.	"The Zoo" (featuring Steve Kuhn)	Steve Kuhn	5:00
8.	"Crumble"	Dinther; Broos	2:33
9.	"Nail" (skit)	Dinther; Broos	2:29
10.	"Toots"	Dinther	5:17
11.	"Teeth"	Dinther	2:28
Total length:			43:26

== Personnel ==
Credits adapted from liner notes.

- Mitchel van Dinther – synthesizer (1–6, 8, 10), other instruments, production, recording, mixing
- Niels Broos – piano (1), synthesizer (1–4, 6, 8–10), Wurlitzer piano (4, 8, 9), Rhodes piano (7), organ (10)
- Dries Laheye – bass guitar (1)
- Frank Wienk – percussion (1, 7)
- Raphael Vanoli – bass guitar (2, 9, 11)
- Marzio Scholten – guitar (3)
- John Dikeman – tenor saxophone (3, 6, 11)
- Julian Sartorius – drums (3–6, 8, 10, 11)
- Carlos Dafé – vocals (4)
- Arthur Verocai – guitar (4)
- Frans Petter Eldh – bass guitar (4, 7)
- Oene van Geel – viola (4, 7, 11)
- Richard Eigner – prepared piano (5)
- Eric van der Westen – double bass (5, 10)
- August Rosenbaum – organ (6), synthesizer (6)
- Stephen Bruner – bass guitar (6)
- Steve Kuhn – vocals (7), Rhodes piano (7)
- Mete Erker – tenor saxophone (10)
- Vincent Helbers – recording, mixing
- Daddy Kev – mastering
- Adam Stover – design, layout
- Philip Akkerman – cover painting
- JHoeko – painting photography
