= Picknick (album) =

Studio album by Boudewijn de Groot
- Released: 1968

Picknick is the third album by Boudewijn de Groot, released in early 1968. The album was created in stereo. The songs themselves were all recorded in 1967.

== Cover ==
The cover of the LP only mentions Boudewijn (instead of his full name). On the original pressing, both LP sides have their own names: "Picknick" and "De Tuin der Lusten". On reprints they both have the same name: "Picknick".

The cover was designed and executed by the artist duo The Fool, who designed psychedelic covers.

== Tracklist ==
All lyrics are written by Lennaert Nijgh (except when noted); all music is composed by Boudewijn de Groot

Side 1 – Picknick
No.	Title	Length
1.	"Picknick" (lyrics: Boudewijn de Groot)	3:30
2.	"Ballade van de vriendinnen voor één nacht"	2:54
3.	"Cinderella"	4:36
4.	"Ballade van wat beter is"	2:11
5.	"Tegenland"	4:58
6.	"Mensen om me heen"	5:51

Side 2 – De tuin der lusten
No.	Title	Length
1.	"Canzone 4711"	3:27
2.	"Eva"	3:01
3.	"De tuin der lusten"	2:40
4.	"Megaton"	3:11
5.	"Glazen stilte"	2:05
6.	"Prikkebeen" (With Elly Nieman)	4:12
