= Picnic Day =

Picnic Day may refer to:

- Picnic Day (Australian holiday), in Australia's Northern Territory
- Picnic Day (UC Davis), a student-run event at University of California, Davis

== See also ==
- The Picnic, a holiday custom in Poland
