= Brownie (guitar) =

Nickname of guitar used by Eric Clapton

- Manufacturer: Fender

Construction
- Body type: Solid
- Neck joint: Bolt-on

Woods
- Body: Alder
- Neck: Maple
- Fretboard: Maple

Colors available
- Two-tone sunburst

Brownie is the nickname for a Fender Stratocaster that was used extensively by Eric Clapton during the early 1970s, most notably with Derek and the Dominos on their 1970 album Layla and Other Assorted Love Songs.

== Overview ==
The guitar has an alder body, two-tone sunburst finish, a maple neck, skunk-stripe on the back of the neck, routing and black dot inlays. It was manufactured in 1956 and the serial number is 12073. Clapton purchased the guitar at London's Sound City while touring with Cream on 7 May 1967 for US$400 and used it for both concert and studio. The guitar appeared on his first solo album Eric Clapton where it can be seen on the cover. Its most noteworthy usage can be heard on the Layla and Other Assorted Love Songs album also recorded in 1970. But after 1971, Brownie served as back-up for Clapton's main Fender Stratocaster, Blackie. At the 1969 Blind Faith concert in Hyde Park, London, Clapton played a Fender Custom Telecaster, which was fitted with Brownie's neck. Clapton preferred to buy a neck with a worn fretboard rather than a new one as he felt that a neck worn from playing had obviously been favoured by players, and was likely to play very well.

== Auction ==
On 24 June 1999, Clapton auctioned Brownie through Christie's in New York City to help raise funds for his alcohol and drug treatment center, Crossroads Centre. It was sold for US $497,500, becoming the most expensive guitar ever sold at the time, only to be eclipsed by Clapton's other favourite guitar, Blackie, which was sold for US $959,500 on 24 June 2004. Brownie can now be seen by the public at the Experience Music Project in Seattle, Washington. In 2005, another Stratocaster, signed by a large group of celebrities, including Clapton, was auctioned to benefit the victims of the 2004 Asian tsunami. It was sold for US $2.8 million, breaking Blackie's record.

== Custom Shop reproduction ==
In February 2013, Fender announced a Custom Shop reproduction of Brownie available exclusively through Guitar Center on 21 March 2013. The manufacturer's suggested retail price (USD) of the tribute guitar was valued at US$14,999.00.

== See also ==
- Blackie
- The Fool
- List of guitars
