= Lennaert Nijgh =

Dutch poet, writer and screenwriter (1945–2002)

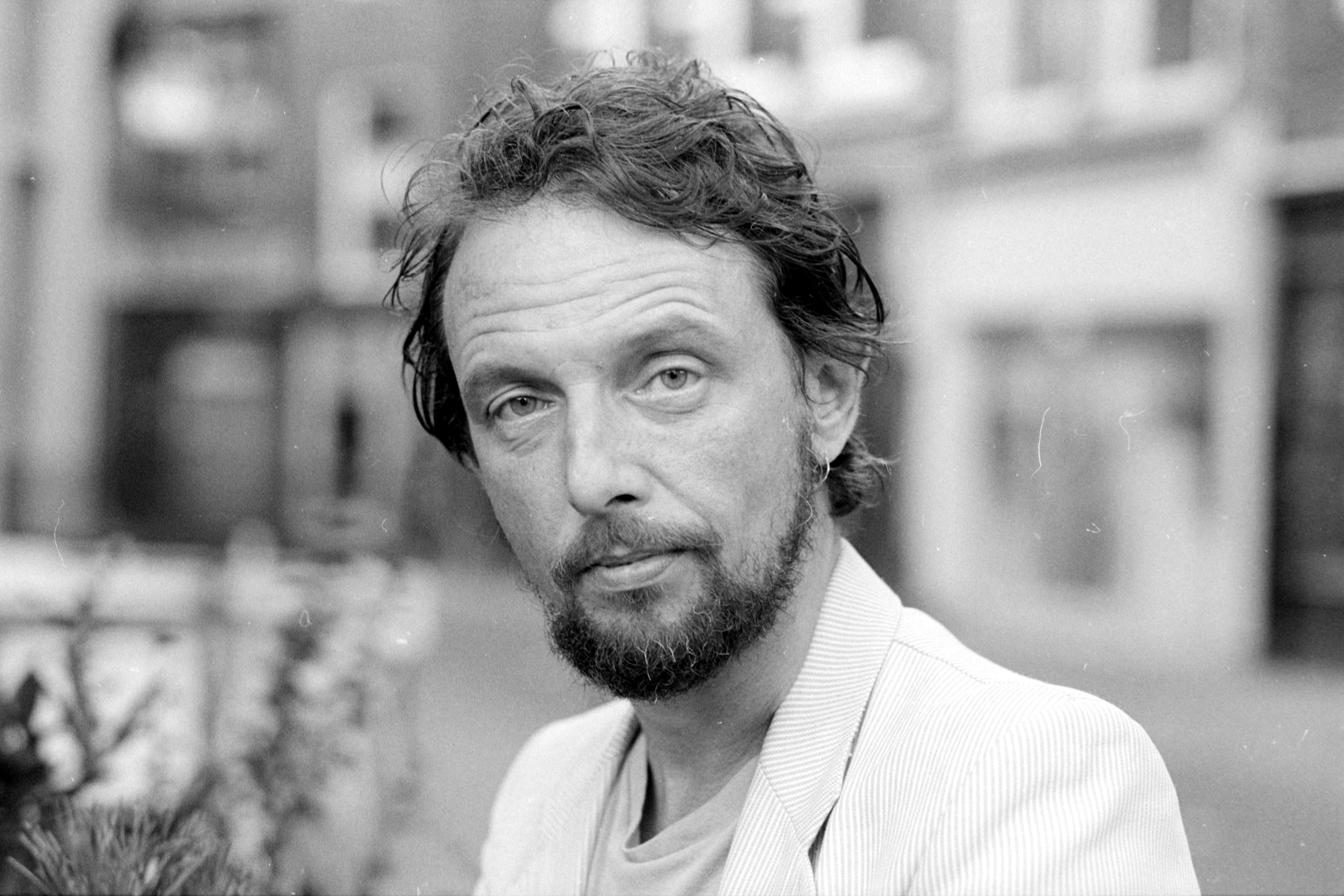
- Nijgh in 1985
- Born: Lennaert Herman Nijgh; January 29, 1945; Haarlem
- Died: November 28, 2002 (aged 57); Haarlem
- Occupations: Lyricist, columnist, writer
- Years active: 1966–2002

Lennaert Herman Nijgh (January 29, 1945 in Haarlem – November 28, 2002 in Haarlem) was a Dutch lyricist. Nijgh was most commonly known as the lyricist for Boudewijn de Groot.

== Biography ==
Nijgh was an only child and grew up in Heemstede. He went to the Coornhert Lyceum in Haarlem, together with his childhood friend Boudewijn de Groot. After two years Nijgh left the school, claiming that he was thrown out. He continued his education at the Kennemer Lyceum in Overveen. In the meantime, he stayed friends with De Groot. He then went to the Netherlands Film Academy, but never graduated.

Nijgh's breakthrough started when the record label Philips published the single Een meisje van 16, which was an adaptation of Charles Aznavour's ballad Une enfant (de seize ans), and was sung by Boudewijn de Groot. Nijgh was coached by Ernst van Altena, who had previously translated works by Jacques Brel.

In 1968, Nijgh and De Groot temporarily stopped working together. However, in 1973, the two started collaborating again.

Nijgh married three times, but never had any children. His first marriage was in 1969, with Dutch singer Astrid Nijgh (née De Backer). The couple divorced halfway through the seventies, but continued working together professionally. Nijgh married two more times after that.

Nijgh owned a ship named De Jonge Jacob (The Young Jacob), that he bought from a fisherman from Urk in 1969. Nijgh was a frequent visitor of Urk during his life. He used his ship to sail to England every year. His neighbour was Mart Smeets and they always greeted one another with the line "Dag meneer van de sport/kunst" (Hello sir of the sports/arts).

Nijgh's parents died in 2000, after which he wrote melancholy columns for a while.

Nijgh died on November 28, 2002, of gastrointestinal bleeding. He was hospitalized at that time because of kidney stones.

== Work ==
=== Type of work ===
Nijgh worked with many older styles in his music, such as the rederijkersballad, the refrain and the acrostic. Nijgh chose mostly timeless themes for his songs, such as prostitution, love and peace, but also wrote about current events, such as the Vietnam War. He also made use of cultural figures such as: Jeroen Bosch, Vondel, Reve, Mozart, Freud, Jung, Hans Christian Andersen, Fellini, Frans Hals and Leonardo da Vinci. His educational background was visible in his use of Tacitus and Biblical themes.

=== Collaboration with Boudewijn de Groot ===
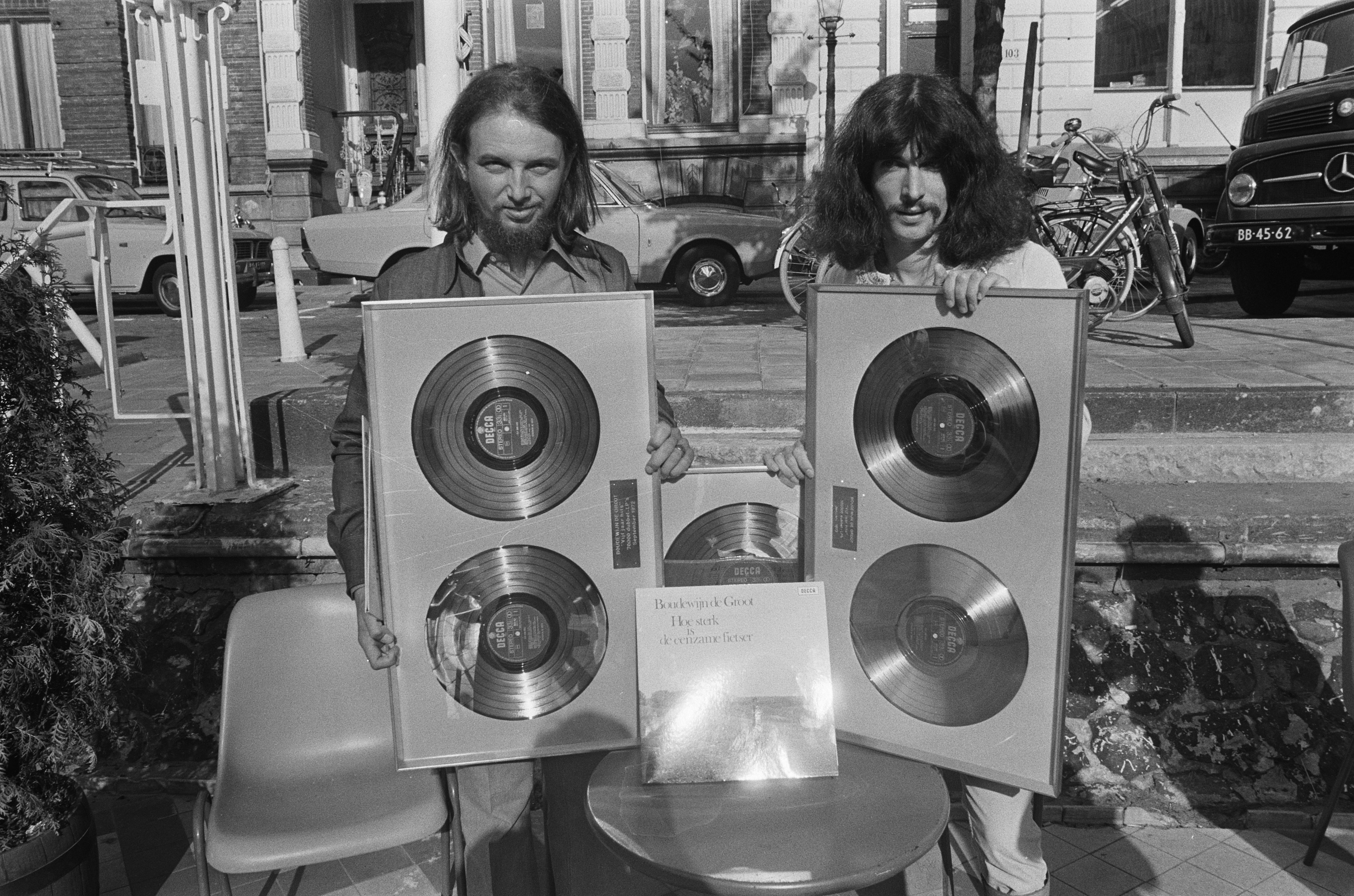
Nijgh and De Groot in 1973

The first collaboration of Nijgh and De Groot was in an 8mm film that Nijgh made, in which De Groot sang two songs. Ed Lautenslager was impressed by the songs and put Nijgh and De Groot in contact with the record label Phonogram.

De Groot became famous in the sixties for his protest songs, of which the lyrics were written by Nijgh. Their first hit was "Een meisje van 16". The second, "Welterusten mijnheer de president'", made De Groot famous as a protest singer.

Near the ending of the sixties, De Groot felt that Nijgh's lyrics were becoming less fitting for his image. Before their split in 1968, the duo had some more big hits, such as "Het Land van Maas en Waal'" (with the B-side "Testament") and "Prikkebeen". In 1973 Nijgh and De Groot started working together again, with the LP Hoe sterk is de eenzame fietser. The album became a huge success.

At the start of the nineties, Nijgh and De Groot lived together for a while. De Groot ended up marrying Nijgh's second wife in 1995. Nijgh also wrote songs for De Groot's son – Marcel de Groot.

=== Collaboration with different artists ===
Nijgh didn't write lyrics exclusively for De Groot. He also wrote for several other famous Dutch singers, such as: Astrid Nijgh (his first wife), Jenny Arean, Flairck, Jasperina de Jong, Liesbeth List and Ramses Shaffy, Elly Nieman, Rob de Nijs and Cobi Schreijer. Nijgh also translated lyrics of foreign artists into Dutch, such as chansons by Charles Aznavour and Jacques Brel.

=== Musicals ===
Nijgh wrote several musicals. To honour the 700-year anniversary of Amsterdam in 1975, Nijgh wrote De engel van Amsterdam, an adaptation of Vondel's play, Gijsbrecht van Aemstel. In 1985, he wrote the rock opera Ik, Jan Cremer, which flopped. Nijgh also translated musicals, such as the American musical Salvation. Nijgh worked on the Annie M.G. Schmidt production Met Man En Muis.

== Other works ==
Nijgh wrote for almost his entire life, except for times where he suffered from writer's block. He started by writing columns in the newspaper of the Coornhert Lyceum. He also wrote columns in the Haarlems Dagblad using the pseudonym Zeepbel. He wrote several books (including a novel named Tobia). Three years before his death Nijgh wrote a book named Met Open Mond, in which he described the history of Van der Pigge, a pharmacy in Haarlem that still sells the book.

== Awards during life ==
- Golden Harp 1970 of Stichting Conamus
- Literaire Cultuurprijs (Prize for Literary Culture) of Hilversum 1974
- In 1999 Nijgh and De Groot were knighted in the Order of the Netherlands Lion.

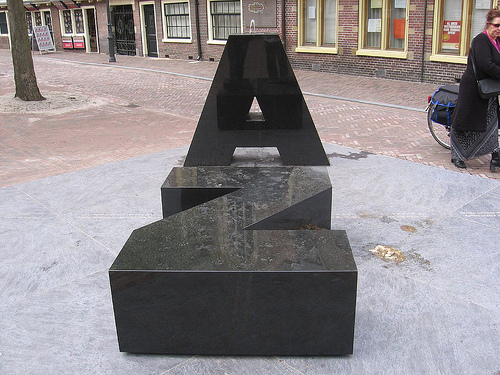
Sculpture to honour Nijgh

== After death ==
In 2005, a sculpture in honour of Nijgh was revealed on the Oude Groenmarkt in Haarlem. The sculpture, consisting of the letters A and Z was designed by Marinus Boezem. According to Boezem, the first and last letters of the alphabet symbolize the material that writers and poets use to create their art.

In November 2007 the biography Testament, about Nijgh's life, written by Peter Voskuil, was published.

In 2014, Buma created the Lennaert Nijgh Prize for best lyricist.

The Lennaert Nijghpad in Haarlem was named after him.

Nijgh's written testimony is stored in the Letterkundig Museum in The Hague. In 2013 fifteen unknown texts were discovered. De Groot did not want to use them, instead, making them available to Frank Boeijen and Han Kooreneef for a theater show about Nijgh's life, in which Jim de Groot, Izaline Calister and Sjors van der Panne will perform.

== Music ==
- Het mooiste van Lennaert Nijgh (CD) Universal 9807466, 2003. Lyrics by Nijgh, music by De Dijk, Liesbeth List, Ramses Shaffy, Rob de Nijs, Joost Nuissl, Cobi Schreijer, Boudewijn and Marcel de Groot, Herman van Veen, Astrid Nijgh and Stef Bos.

== Films ==
- Feestje Bouwen 1962
- De Aanslag 1963, "paasvakantie"
- Illusie 1964
- Elsje in Wonderland 1966?
- Vox Humama 1966
- Een Vreemde Vogel (1967) with Boudewijn de Groot, Martine Bijl, Jan Blokker and Ramses Shaffy.
- Een tip van de sluier 1979
- Lieve jongens 1980

== Literature ==
- Voor de overlevenden en andere liedjes (1966)
- Tobia, of De ontdekking van het masturbariaat (1971) – 2e druk 1991: ISBN 90-5429-003-X
- De dynastie der kleine luyden (1974) – ISBN 906010365-3
- Tachtig teksten (1975) – ISBN 9789060103661
- Journaal van Bontekoe (translation) (1989) – ISBN 90-6455-089-1 (available through DBNL)
- Stad van hout: columns uit Haarlems Dagblad, 1986–1989 (1989) — ISBN 90-71380-58-0
- Moord en doodslag: twaalf beroemde Nederlandse moordzaken (1990) — ISBN 9789071380945
- Tekst en uitleg: liedteksten 1964–1990 (1991) — ISBN 90-71380-71-8
- Haarlem bestaat niet (1996) – ISBN 90-9009197-1
- Met open mond. 150 jaar Drogisterij A.J. van der Pigge (1999) – ISBN 90-9012309-1
- Ik doe wat ik doe [boek + CD] (2000) – ISBN 90-388-5505-2

=== Translations ===
- Many song lyrics and several musicals.
- Mijn naam is Asjer Lev, book by Chaim Potok, 1974

==== After death ====
- Nog even en ik zie de hemel weer (2003) – ISBN 9789038855172
- Katten Columns (2004)
- Kerstvertellingen (2004)

=== About Nijgh ===
- Margreet Pop: Lennaert Nijgh verbeeld. Hommage aan een echte Haarlemmer. Haarlem 2005 — ISBN 90-9020188-2
- Peter Voskuil: Testament. Leven en werk van Lennaert Nijgh. Kats, 2007. (Biografie) — ISBN 9789071359057
