= The Fool (The Fool album) =

1968 studio album by the Fool

Studio album by the Fool
- Released: December 1968
- Genre: Pop
- Length: 35:38
- Label: Mercury
- Producer: Graham Nash

Professional ratings
Review scores
Source	Rating
AllMusic	4/5 stars

The Fool (later The Fool...Plus on a 1998 CD reissue) is a 1968 album by the Dutch design collective the Fool, produced by Graham Nash.

== Track listing ==
All tracks are written by Simon Posthuma, Marijke Koger, Josje Leeger, and Barry Finch.

Side one
No.	Title	Length
1.	"Fly"	2:25
2.	"Voice on the Wind"	5:24
3.	"Rainbow Man"	2:20
4.	"Cry for Me"	3:51
5.	"No One Will Ever Know"	2:50

Side two
No.	Title	Length
6.	"Reincarnation"	4:06
7.	"Hello Little Sister"	2:00
8.	"Keep on Pushin'"	6:00
9.	"Inside Your Mind"	2:42
10.	"Lay it Down"	4:50
