= Foolish Lake =

Lake in the state of California, United States

- Location within California
- Location: Fresno County, California
- Coordinates: 37.3040°N 118.9007°W
- Type: lake

Foolish Lake is a lake in Fresno County, California, in the United States.

Foolish Lake was so named by a biologist who, noting the lack of scenery, wrote "it would be foolish for anyone ever to revisit it".

== See also ==
- List of lakes in California
