= Tomfoolery (EP) =

tomfoolery

EP by The Vaughns
- Released: 24 October 2015
- Studio: Cannon Found Soundation
- Genres: Rock, indie rock
- Length: 27:36
- Label: Sniffling Indie Kids

The Vaughns chronology
The Vaughns (2014)	tomfoolery (2015)

tomfoolery is the second studio EP from the American rock band The Vaughns.

== Content ==
The six-track EP was released on 24 October 2015, on compact disc and digital download with Sniffling Indie Kids. The Vaughns recorded tomfoolery at Cannon Found Soundation in Union City, New Jersey with Mike Oettinger and Jesse Cannon. The band explains "all six of these songs [are ones] which we have been playing for the last couple of months [and] we had one goal in mind when recording tomfoolery, to capture our live energy." The EP is thematically about perseverance, love and relationships, and is described as "six energetic rock 'n' roll songs that have plenty of guitar solos and fun unexpected additions." It draws comparison to the music of the alternative rock musician Courtney Barnett and the rock band the White Stripes. The album release party was at The Court Tavern in New Brunswick, New Jersey, and The Vaughns were joined by Wyland, Deal Casino, Goodbye Tiger, and CachaBacha. The EP led The Vaughns to establishing themselves in the New Jersey music scene.

The music video for "Phase Me" was released in October 2015, and was directed by Ian Nessier and Austin Lepri at Voidwalker Productions. It follows a fans' perspective, who travels to see The Vaughns at a basement show. The compact disc edition of tomfoolery comes with a bonus track download, entitled "Lay Me Out".

== Reception ==
Comparing tomfoolery to the Vaughns debut EP, Speak Into My Good Eye editor Chelsea Conte notes the "grittiness echoes throughout the six tracks just enough to give it an edgier vibe," adding "each song is slightly different than the rest while still retaining a cohesive album feel." Bobby Oliver in NJ.com describes tomfoolery as a "blend of professional gloss and the band's natural turbulence," and says there is "a newfound confidence shoulders Lies' vocal performance, guitarist Dave Cacciatore's shreds are sharper and more aggressive, and Tom Losito's bass rolls with ease."

A review by The Aquarian Weekly says the Vaughns "are as alt-rock as you can get. Singer Anna Lies' vocals really colored in the alternative style of the music nicely," adding tomfoolery has "some great songs." NJ.com says tomfoolery "is wonderfully confident," noting singer Anna Lies' "quivering, idiosyncratic vocal stands out in the state and the young group's upside is palpable in 2016." The EP was nominated for an Asbury Park Music Award.

== Tracklisting ==
No.	Title	Length
1.	"What's Cooking"	3:27
2.	"Please Don't Take Offense"	4:28
3.	"Phase Me"	3:53
4.	"Mr. Skully"	4:07
5.	"Roses"	3:56
6.	"Willoughby"	4:30
7.	"Lay Me Out"	3:15
Total length:		27:36

== Personnel ==
- Dave Cacciatore – guitar and vocals
- Ryan Kenter – drums and percussion
- Anna Lies – vocals, guitar and synth
- Tom Losito – bass and vocals
