= Eric Clapton albums discography =

Eric Clapton discography
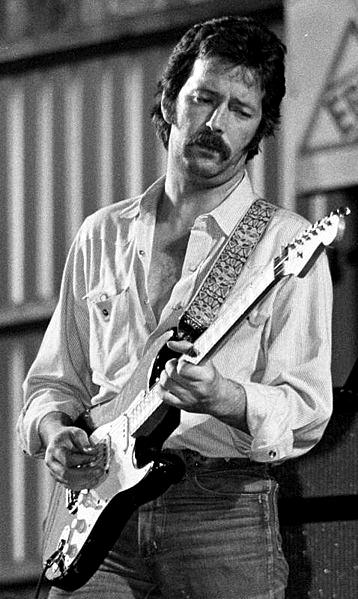
- Clapton in Switzerland, 1977
- Studio albums: 22
- Soundtrack albums: 7
- Live albums: 16
- Compilation albums: 22
- Collaborative albums: 6

British guitarist and singer-songwriter Eric Clapton's recording career as a solo artist began in 1970, with the release of his self-titled debut, Eric Clapton. Since then, he has released several best selling albums, such as Unplugged (1992), From the Cradle (1994), and Clapton Chronicles: The Best of Eric Clapton (1999).

To date, Clapton has reportedly sold 280 million records worldwide, becoming one of the best-selling music artist in history. According to RIAA, he has sold 40 million certified albums in the United States (including one diamond, seven multi-platinum and 23 gold records). According to Billboard, Clapton is the 38th Greatest Artist of all time in their chart history, as well as the 38th Greatest Mainstream Rock Artist of all time. Clapton is also the 24th Most Successful Artist on Billboard 200 history. Unplugged remains his career's best seller with over 26 million copies sold worldwide, and is recognised as the biggest-selling live album in history.

== Studio albums ==
List of studio albums with title, album details, peak chart positions, and certifications
Title	Album details	Peak chart positions										Certifications
Title	Album details	UK	AUS	AUT	GER	NL	NOR	NZ	SWE	SWI	US	Certifications
Eric Clapton	Released: August 1970; Label: Polydor (UK), Atco (US); Formats: LP	14	7	—	—	—	17	—	—	—	13	
461 Ocean Boulevard	Released: August 1974; Label: RSO; Format: Long playing record (LP), audio cassette (cass)	3	2	—	11	4	4	38	—	—	1	BPI: Gold; RIAA: Gold
There's One in Every Crowd	Released: April 1975; Label: RSO; Format: LP, cass	15	15	—	—	—	—	24	—	—	21	BPI: Silver
No Reason to Cry	Released: August 1976; Label: RSO; Format: LP, cass	8	30	—	—	9	13	18	24	—	15	BPI: Silver
Slowhand	Released: November 1977; Label: RSO; Format: LP, cass	23	46	—	66	17	5	32	41	—	2	BPI: Gold; RIAA: 3× Platinum; SWI: Gold
Backless	Released: November 1978; Label: RSO; Format: LP	18	16	24	—	22	2	22	28	—	8	BPI: Silver; RIAA: Platinum
Another Ticket	Released: February 1981; Label: RSO; Format: LP, cass	18	30	—	26	38	5	3	26	—	7	RIAA: Gold
Money and Cigarettes	Released: January 1983; Label: Duck/Warner; Format: LP	13	20	—	22	16	3	11	5	—	16	
Behind the Sun	Released: March 1985; Label: Duck/Warner; Format: LP, cass, compact audio disc (CD)	8	50	30	15	5	5	21	10	3	34	RIAA: Platinum
August	Release: November 1986; Label: Duck/Warner; Format: LP, cass, CD	3	34	—	32	29	12	38	7	23	37	BPI: Platinum; RIAA: Gold
Journeyman	Released: November 1989; Label: Duck/Reprise; Format: LP, cass, CD	2	27	29	16	9	2	43	3	—	16	BPI: Platinum; NVPI: Gold; RIAA: 2× Platinum; SWE: Gold; SWI: Gold
From the Cradle	Released: September 1994; Label: Duck/Warner; Format: LP, cass, CD	1	6	1	6	3	4	2	2	—	1	BPI: Gold; BVMI: Gold; IFPI AUT: Gold; RIAA: 3× Platinum; SWE: Gold; SWI: Gold
Pilgrim	Released: March 1998; Label: Reprise; Format: CD, cass	6	17	4	3	7	1	10	3	—	4	BPI: Gold; ARIA: Gold; BVMI: Gold; IFPI AUT: Gold; IFPI NOR: Gold; RIAA: Platinum; SWE: Gold; SWI: Gold
Reptile	Released: March 2001; Label: Reprise; Format: LP, CD	7	20	2	2	9	7	15	9	—	5	BPI: Gold; BVMI: Gold; RIAA: Gold; SWI: Gold
Me and Mr. Johnson	Released: March 2004; Label: Reprise; Format: LP, CD	10	23	5	8	12	14	14	7	—	6	BPI: Gold; RIAA: Gold
Sessions for Robert J	Released: December 2004; Label: Reprise; Format: CD	—	—	74	—	—	—	—	—	—	172	
Back Home	Released: August 2005; Label: Reprise; Format: LP, CD	19	—	9	2	9	6	—	5	4	13	RIAA: Gold
Clapton	Released: September 2010; Label: Reprise; Format: LP, CD	7	21	5	3	9	5	11	5	4	6	BVMI: Gold
Old Sock	Released: March 2013; Label: Surfdog; Format: LP, CD	13	22	7	5	7	7	11	14	—	7	
I Still Do	Released: May 2016; Label: Bushbranch/Surfdog; Format: LP, CD	6	10	3	5	5	12	5	13	—	6	
Happy Xmas	Released: October 2018; Label: Bushbranch/Surfdog; Format: LP, CD	97	—	45	37	—	—	—	—	—	84	
Meanwhile	Released: October 2024; Label: Bushbranch/Surfdog; Format: LP, CD	—	—	4	5	—	—	—	—	4	—	
"—" denotes releases that did not chart

== Live albums ==
List of live albums with title, album details, peak chart positions, and certifications
Title	Album details	Peak chart positions										Certifications
Title	Album details	UK	AUS	AUT	GER	NL	NOR	NZ	SWE	SWI	US	Certifications
Eric Clapton's Rainbow Concert	Released: 10 September 1973; Label: RSO; Format: Long playing record (LP)	19	51	—	—	—	—	—	—	—	18	BPI: Silver
E. C. Was Here	Released: August 1975; Label: RSO; Format: LP, audio cassette (cass)	14	29	—	34	—	13	—	—	—	20	BPI: Silver
Just One Night	Released: April 1980; Label: RSO; Format: 2×LP, 2×compact audio disc (CD)	3	22	—	16	36	13	3	44	—	2	BPI: Silver; RIAA: Gold
Time Pieces Vol.II Live in the Seventies	Released: May 1983; Label: RSO; Format: LP, cass	—	—	—	—	—	—	28	—	—	—	BPI: Gold
24 Nights	Released: 8 October 1991; Label: Duck/Reprise; Format: 2×LP, 2×CD, 2×cass	17	49	—	48	36	—	49	—	19	38	BPI: Gold; RIAA: Gold
Unplugged	Released: 25 August 1992; Label: Duck/Reprise; Format: LP, CD, cass	2	1	3	3	1	6	1	3	—	1	BPI: 4× Platinum; ARIA: 8× Platinum; BVMI: 2× Platinum; IFPI AUT: 2× Platinum; NVPI: 4× Platinum; RIAA: Diamond (10× Platinum); SWE: Platinum; SWI: 2× Platinum
Crossroads 2: Live in the Seventies	Released: 25 March 1996; Label: Polydor; Format: 4×CD	115	—	—	—	—	—	—	—	—	137	
One More Car, One More Rider	Released: November 2002; Label: Duck/Reprise; Format: CD	69	—	37	21	—	15	—	40	26	43	
Crossroads Guitar Festival 2013	Released: November 2013; Label: Reprise/Rhino; Format: 2×CD	—	—	63	—	75	—	—	—	50	—	
Slowhand at 70 – Live at the Royal Albert Hall	Released: November 2015; Label: Eagle; Format: 3×CD	—	—	—	6	—	—	—	—	—	—	
Crossroads Revisited: Selections from the Crossroads Guitar Festivals	Released: July 2016; Label: Rhino; Format: 3×CD	—	30	12	62	39	—	—	—	—	122	
Live in San Diego	Released: September 2016; Label: Reprise/Warner; Format: CD	60	—	23	20	36	—	—	—	—	—	
Crossroads Guitar Festival 2019	Released: 20 November 2020; Label: Warner/Rhino; Format: CD	—	—	—	6	—	—	—	—	—	—	
The Lady in the Balcony: Lockdown Sessions	Released: November 2021; Label: Bushbranch/ Mercury/Universal; Format: CD, 2×LP	—	—	9	4	10	39	—	—	—	—	
Nothing but the Blues	Released: 24 June 2022; Label: Duck/Reprise; Format: CD, 2×LP	44	—	13	8	19	—	—	—	—	—	
To Save a Child: An Intimate Live Concert	Released: 26 April 2024; Label: EPC/Surfdog; Format: CD, LP	—	—	13	24	—	—	—	—	—	—	
"—" denotes releases that did not chart

== Compilation albums ==
List of compilation albums with title, album details, peak chart positions, and certifications
Title	Album details	Peak chart positions										Certifications
Title	Album details	UK	AUS	AUT	GER	NL	NOR	NZ	SWE	SWI	US	Certifications
The Best of Eric Clapton	Released: January 1970; Label: Karussell, Polydor; Format: LP; Notes: Tracks from 1970		—	—	—	—	—	—	—	—		BPI: Gold
The History of Eric Clapton	Released: March 1972; Released: August 1973; Label: Polydor (UK), Atco (US); Format: 2×LP; Notes: Also includes tracks with Blind Faith, Delaney and Bonnie, Derek and the Dominos	20	—	—	—	—	—	—	—	—	6	RIAA: Gold
Eric Clapton at His Best	Released: September 1972; Label: Polydor (UK & US); Format: 2×LP; Notes: Also includes tracks with Blind Faith, Delaney and Bonnie, Derek and the Dominos	—	—	—	—	—	—	—	—	—	87	
Clapton	Released: February 1973; Label: Polydor (UK & US); Format: LP	—	—	—	—	—	—	—	—	—	67	
Steppin' Out	Released: June 1981; Label: Decca; Format: LP, cassette; Notes: 1966 recordings with John Mayall	—	—	—	—	—	—	—	—	—	—	
Timepieces: The Best of Eric Clapton	Released: April 1982; Label: RSO; Format: LP, cassette, CD	20	28	—	—	11	—	22	—	—	101	BPI: Gold; IFPI AUT: Platinum; NVPI: Platinum; RIAA: 7× Platinum; SWI: Gold
Backtrackin'	Released: May 1984; Label: Starblend; Format: 2×LP, 2×cassette	29	—	—	—	79	—	35	—	—	—	BPI: Silver
The Cream of Eric Clapton	Released: September 1987; Label: Polydor (UK); Format: 2×LP, 2×cassette, CD; Notes: Also includes tracks with Cream	3	12	—	—	—	—	—	—	—	—	BPI: 3× Platinum; ARIA: Platinum; SWI: Gold
Crossroads	Released: April 1988; Label: Polydor (UK), Atco (US); Format: 6×LP, 4×cassette, 4×CD; Notes: Boxed set spanning 1964–1988	—	—	—	—	60	—	—	—	—	34	RIAA: 3× Platinum
Story	Released: 1991; Label: Polydor; Format: CD	—	—	24	17	8	—	—	—	—	—	NVPI: Platinum; SWI: Gold
The Best of Eric Clapton	Released: 16 September 1991; Label: Polydor; Format: CD, cassette, 2×LP; Notes: Also includes tracks with Cream	–	–	—	—	—	–	—	—	—	—	BPI: Gold
Stages	Released: May 1993; Label: Spectrum; Format: CD; Notes: Also includes tracks with Mayall, Cream, Derek and the Dominos	—	—	—	—	—	—	—	—	—	—	BPI: Silver
The Cream of Clapton	Released: March 1995; Label: Polydor; Format: CD; Notes: Also includes tracks with Cream	52	—	—	17	—	14	9	3	—	80	RIAA: 2× Platinum
Strictly the Blues	Released: 1996; Label: Castle; Format: CD; Notes: Tracks with the Yardbirds and Mayall	—	—	—	—	—	—	—	—	—	—	BPI: Silver
Blues	Released: June 1999; Label: Polydor; Format: 2×CD, 2×cassette	52	38	—	—	—	—	10	—	—	52	RIAA: Gold
The Blues Years	Released: August 1999; Label: Castle; Format: CD; Notes: Tracks with the Yardbirds, Jimmy Page, Mayall	—	—	—	—	—	—	—	—	—	—	BPI: Silver
Clapton Chronicles: The Best of Eric Clapton	Released: October 1999; Label: Duck/Reprise; Format: CD	6	16	1	3	17	3	12	1	5	20	BPI: 2× Platinum; ARIA: 2×Platinum; BVMI: Platinum; IFPI AUT: Platinum; RIAA: Platinum; SWE: Platinum; SWI: Gold
Martin Scorsese Presents the Blues: Eric Clapton	Released: September 2003; Label: Polydor/Universal; Format: CD; Notes: From Scorsese's blues series; tracks with Mayall, Cream, Derek and the Dominos	—	—	—	—	—	—	—	—	—	—	
20th Century Masters – The Millennium Collection: The Best of Eric Clapton	Released: June 2004; Label: Universal; Format: CD; Notes: Tracks from the 1970s	—	—	—	—	—	—	—	—	—	—	
Complete Clapton	Released: October 2007; Label: Polydor (UK), Reprise (US); Format: 2×CD; Notes: Also includes tracks with Cream, Blind Faith, Derek and the Dominos	2	38	20	41	15	5	14	11	32	14	BPI: 2× Platinum; RIAA: Gold; RMNZ: Gold
Icon	Released: April 2011; Label: Polydor; Format: CD; Notes: Reissue of the 20th Century Masters album	—	—	—	—	—	—	—	—	114		
Forever Man	Released: April 2015; label: Reprise; Format: 3×CD, 2×LP	8	—	22	4	3	38	37	46	—	48	
"—" denotes releases that did not chart

== Collaborative studio and live albums ==
List of collaborative albums with title, album details, peak chart positions, and certifications
Title	Album details	Peak chart positions										Certifications
Title	Album details	UK	AUS	AUT	GER	NL	NOR	NZ	SWE	SWI	US	Certifications
Retail Therapy	Released: March 1997; Label: Reprise; Format: Compact audio disc (CD); Notes: As T.D.F. with Simon Climie	—	—	—	—	—	—	—	—	—	—	
Riding with the King	Released: June 2000; Label: Reprise; Format: Compact audio disc (CD); Notes: With B.B. King	15	5	3	2	6	—	2	8	3	3	BPI: Gold; BVMI: Gold; IFPI AUT: Gold; NVPI: Gold; RIAA: 2× Platinum; SWI: Gold
The Road to Escondido	Released: November 2006 (US); Label: Reprise; Format: CD, long playing record (LP); Notes: With J.J. Cale	50	43	3	5	3	1	4	—	—	23	BVMI: Platinum; IFPI AUT: Gold; NVPI: Gold; RIAA: Gold; SWI: Gold
Live from Madison Square Garden	Released: May 2009; Label: Duck/Reprise; Format: 2×CD; Notes: With Steve Winwood	40	—	25	8	60	—	—	44	—	14	BVMI: Gold
Play the Blues: Live from Jazz at Lincoln Center	Released: September 2011; Label: Reprise/Rhino; Format: CD; Notes: With Wynton Marsalis	40	—	11	8	21	13	40	51	—	31	BVMI: Platinum
The Breeze: An Appreciation of JJ Cale	Released: July 2014 (US); Label: ADA/Surfdog; Format: CD, LP; Notes: With various artists	3	17	8	2	1	2	3	40	—	2	BVMI: Gold; BPI: Silver
"—" denotes releases that did not chart

== Soundtrack albums ==
List of soundtrack albums with title and album details
Title	Album details
Edge of Darkness	Released: December 1985; Label: BBC; Format: Extended play record (EP); Notes: With Michael Kamen
Lethal Weapon	Released: 1987; Label: Warner Bros.; Format: Compact audio disc (CD); Notes: With Michael Kamen and David Sanborn
Homeboy	Released: February 1989; Label: Virgin; Format: CD, audio cassette, long playing record (LP); Notes: With various artists
Lethal Weapon 2	Released: August 1989; Label: Warner Bros.; Format: CD; Notes: With Michael Kamen and David Sanborn
Rush	Released: January 1992; Label: Duck/Reprise; Format: CD; Certification: Gold – RIAA
Lethal Weapon 3	Released: April 1992; Label: Reprise; Format: CD; Notes: With Michael Kamen and David Sanborn
Life in 12 Bars	Released: June 2018; Label: Universal; Format: 2×CD; Notes: Documentary soundtrack; tracks spanning 1964–1992, plus four by other artists

== Other appearances ==
List of other appearances with song(s), album, year, and references
Year	Song(s)	Album	Ref(s)
1981	"'Cause We've Ended as Lovers", "Farther Up the Road", "Crossroads" (with Jeff Beck) (live)	The Secret Policeman's Other Ball	
1985	"Heaven Is One Step Away"	Back to the Future	
1990	"That Kind of Woman"	Nobody's Child: Romanian Angel Appeal	
1991	"Border Song"	Two Rooms: Celebrating the Songs of Elton John & Bernie Taupin	
1992	"Loving Your Lovin'"	Wayne's World	
1993	"Knockin' on Heaven's Door" and "My Back Pages" (live) ("Don't Think Twice, It's All Right" on 2014 deluxe edition)	The 30th Anniversary Concert Celebration	
1993	"Stone Free"	Stone Free: A Tribute to Jimi Hendrix	
1994	"You Must Believe Me"	A Tribute to Curtis Mayfield	
1994	"Before You Accuse Me" (live)	The Unplugged Collection, Volume One	
1996	"Change the World"	Phenomenon	
1999	"Blue Eyes Blue"	Runaway Bride	
2004	"Burning of the Midnight Lamp"	Power of Soul: A Tribute to Jimi Hendrix	

== Contributions to albums by other artists ==
Albums that Clapton contributed to four or more songs.

List of contributions to albums by other artists, with album title, artist, year, and references
Year	Artist	Album	Ref(s)
1969	Jackie Lomax	Is This What You Want?	
1969	Martha Veléz	Fiends & Angels	
1970	George Harrison	All Things Must Pass	
1970	Doris Troy	Doris Troy	
1971	Various artists	The Concert for Bangladesh	
1971	Bobby Whitlock	Bobby Whitlock	
1971	Dr. John	The Sun, Moon & Herbs	
1971	Howlin' Wolf	The London Howlin' Wolf Sessions	
1972	Buddy Guy and Junior Wells	Play the Blues	
1977	Pete Townshend and Ronnie Lane	Rough Mix	
1977	Freddie King	Freddie King (1934–1976)	
1977	John Mayall	Back to the Roots	
1984	Roger Waters	The Pros and Cons of Hitch Hiking	
1986	Bob Geldof	Deep in the Heart of Nowhere	
1987	George Harrison	Cloud Nine	
1988	Arthur Louis	Knocking on Heaven's Door	
1992	George Harrison	Live in Japan	
2003	Various artists	Concert for George	
2006	Otis Rush and Friends	Live at Montreux 1986	

=== Guest appearances ===
Year	Song	Credited artist	Album	Ref(s)
1964	"Keep Your Hand Out of My Pocket"	Otis Spann	The Blues of Otis Spann	
1964	"Pretty Girls Everywhere"	Otis Spann	The Blues of Otis Spann	
1964	"Rock Me Mama"	Otis Spann	The Blues of Otis Spann	
1966	"Shim-Sham-Shimmy"	Champion Jack Dupree	From New Orleans to Chicago	
1966	"Third Degree"	Champion Jack Dupree	From New Orleans to Chicago	
1967	"The Intro and the Outro"	Bonzo Dog Doo-Dah Band	Gorilla	
1968	"Good to Me As I Am to You"	Aretha Franklin	Lady Soul	
1968	"While My Guitar Gently Weeps"	The Beatles	The Beatles	
1968	"Yer Blues"	Dirty Mac	The Rolling Stones Rock and Roll Circus	
1969	"Cold Turkey"	Plastic Ono Band	John Lennon/Plastic Ono Band	
1969	"Don't Worry Kyoko"	Plastic Ono Band	Fly	
1969	"Do What You Want to Do"	Billy Preston	That's the Way God Planned It	
1969	"That's the Way God Planned It (Parts 1 & 2)"	Billy Preston	That's the Way God Planned It	
1970	"Encouraging Words"	Billy Preston	Encouraging Words	
1970	"Right Now"	Billy Preston	Encouraging Words	
1970	"Don't You Believe It"	Jonathan Kelly	Jonathan Kelly	
1970	"Go Back Home"	Stephen Stills	Stephen Stills	
1970	"Labio Dental Fricative"	Vivian Stanshall	"Labio Dental Fricative" single	
1970	"Paper Round"	Vivian Stanshall	"Labio Dental Fricative" single	
1970	"Man Hole Covered Wagon"	Shawn Phillips	Contribution	
1970	"Teasin'"	King Curtis	Get Ready	
1970	"The New Sweet Home Chicago"	Leon Russell	Leon Russell	
1970	"Prince of Peace"	Leon Russell	Leon Russell	
1971	"Alcatraz"	Leon Russell	Leon Russell and the Shelter People	
1971	"Beware of Darkness"	Leon Russell	Leon Russell and the Shelter People	
1971	"Fishes and Scorpions"	Stephen Stills	Stephen Stills 2	
1972	"Hello L.A., Bye Bye Birmingham"	Bobby Whitlock	Raw Velvet	
1975	"Eyesight to the Blind"	The Who	Tommy (soundtrack)	
1975	"Woorier"	Joe Cocker	Sting Ray	
1976	"Could This Be Called a Song"	Ringo Starr	Ringo's Rotogravure	
1976	"Kinky"	Kinky Friedman	Lasso from El Paso	
1976	"Ol' Ben Lucas"	Kinky Friedman	Lasso from El Paso	
1976	"Romance in Durango"	Bob Dylan	Desire	
1976	"Save It for a Rainy Day"	Stephen Bishop	Careless	
1976	"Sinking in an Ocean of Tears"	Stephen Bishop	Careless	
1977	"On My Way"	Corky Laing	Making It on the Streets	
1978	"Further on Up the Road"	The Band	The Last Waltz	
1978	"I Shall Be Released"	The Band	The Last Waltz	
1979	"Chasing Rainbows"	Marc Benno	Lost in Austin	
1979	"Last Train"	Marc Benno	Lost in Austin	
1979	"Love Comes to Everyone"	George Harrison	George Harrison	
1980	"Barcelona"	Ronnie Lane	See Me	
1980	"Lad's Got Money"	Ronnie Lane	See Me	
1980	"Way Up Yonder"	Ronnie Lane	See Me	
1980	"Hey Pretty Mama"	Alexis Korner	The Party Album	
1980	"Hi-Heel Sneakers"	Alexis Korner	The Party Album	
1980	"Stormy Monday Blues"	Alexis Korner	The Party Album	
1981	"Couldn't Love You More"	John Martyn	Glorious Fool	
1981	"If Leaving Me Is Easy"	Phil Collins	Face Value	
1983	"Everybody's in a Hurry but Me"	Ringo Starr	Old Wave	
1984	"The Challenge"	Christine McVie	Christine McVie	
1986	"Tonight Will Be Alright"	Lionel Richie	Dancing on the Ceiling	
1987	"They Dance Alone"	Sting	...Nothing Like the Sun	
1988	"Ain't That the Way"	Carole King	City Streets	
1988	"City Streets"	Carole King	City Streets	
1988	"Had a Dream About You, Baby"	Bob Dylan	Down in the Groove	
1988	"Why Does Love Got to Be So Sad?"	Buckwheat Zydeco	Taking It Home	
1988	"Little Moon"	Stephen Bishop	Red Cab to Manhattan	
1988	"Sex Kittens Go to College"	Stephen Bishop	Red Cab to Manhattan	
1989	"Hall Light"	Stephen Bishop	Bowling in Paris	
1989	"I Wish It Would Rain Down"	Phil Collins	...But Seriously	
1989	"Insecurious"	Cyndi Lauper	A Night to Remember	
1989	"A Wonderful World"	Zucchero	Oro Incenso & Birra	
1990	"Little Red Rooster"	The Rolling Stones	Flashpoint	
1991	"Blues #572"	Johnnie Johnson	Johnnie B. Bad	
1991	"Creek Mud"	Johnnie Johnson	Johnnie B. Bad	
1991	"Early in the Morning"	Buddy Guy	Damn Right, I've Got the Blues	
1991	"Mr. Bluesman"	Richie Sambora	Stranger in This Town	
1992	"Full House"	David Sanborn	Upfront	
1993	"And So Is Love"	Kate Bush	The Red Shoes	
1996	"Here in the Dark"	Taj Mahal	Phantom Blues	
1996	"(You've Got to) Love Her with a Feeling"	Taj Mahal	Phantom Blues	
1996	"Talk to Me"	Babyface	The Day	
1999	"The Calling"	Santana	Supernatural	
1999	"Gee Baby Ain't I Good to You"	Bill Wyman's Rhythm Kings	Anyway the Wind Blows	
2002	"All That You Are"	Jools Holland	Jools Holland's Big Band Rhythm & Blues	
2002	"What Would I Do Without You"	Jools Holland	Jools Holland's Big Band Rhythm & Blues	
2003	"Never Without You"	Ringo Starr	Ringorama	
2004	"Blue Moon"	Rod Stewart	Stardust: The Great American Songbook, Volume III	
2004	"City Blues"	Brian Wilson	Gettin' In Over My Head	
2005	"Slogans"	Bob Marley	Africa Unite: The Singles Collection	
2007	"A Wonderful World" (live version)	Zucchero	Zu & Co: Live at the Royal Albert Hall	
2008	"City That Care Forgot"	Dr. John	The City That Care Forgot	
2008	"Stripped Away"	Dr. John	The City That Care Forgot	
2008	"Time for a Change"	Dr. John	The City That Care Forgot	
2008	"Dirty City"	Steve Winwood	Nine Lives	
2008	"Every Time I Sing the Blues"	Buddy Guy	Skin Deep	
2009	"Choose or Cop Out"	Paul Jones	Starting All Over Again	
2009	"Starting All Over Again"	Paul Jones	Starting All Over Again	
2009	"Roll On"	J. J. Cale	Roll On	
2012	"My Valentine"	Paul McCartney	Kisses on the Bottom	
2014	"Can't Find My Way Home"	Nathan East	Nathan East	
2016	"Everyone Knows About My Good Thing"	The Rolling Stones	Blue & Lonesome	
2016	"I Can't Quit You Baby"	The Rolling Stones	Blue & Lonesome	
2017	"Medicated Goo"	P.P. Arnold	The Turning Tide	
2017	"Born"	P.P. Arnold	The Turning Tide	
2017	"You Can't Always Get What You Want"	P.P. Arnold	The Turning Tide	
2017	"Little Dream"	Kurt Rosenwinkel	Caipi	
2018	"I'm Not Rough"	Wynton Marsalis Septet	United We Swing	
2018	"The Watcher"	Hawkwind	Road to Utopia	
2022	"One of Those Days"	Ozzy Osbourne	Patient Number 9	

== See also ==
- The Yardbirds discography
- John Mayall discography
- Cream discography
- Blind Faith discography
- Derek and the Dominos discography
- Eric Clapton and Jimmy Page – Blues Anytime
- Eric Clapton and the Powerhouse – What's Shakin'
- Plastic Ono Band – Live Peace in Toronto 1969
- Delaney & Bonnie & Friends – On Tour with Eric Clapton
- Eric Clapton videography
- List of awards and nominations received by Eric Clapton

== Bibliography ==
- Bowling, Dave (2013). Eric Clapton FAQ: All That's Left to Know About Slowhand. Milwaukee, Wisconsin: Backbeat Books. ISBN 978-1-61713-574-3.
- Clapton, Eric (2007). Clapton: The Autobiography. New York City: Broadway Books. ISBN 978-0-7679-2536-5.
- Roberty, Mark (1993). Slowhand: The Complete Life and Times of Eric Clapton. New York City: Crown Trade Paperbacks. ISBN 0-517-88118-7.
- Schumacher, Michael (2003). The Life and Music of Eric Clapton. New York City: Citadel Press. ISBN 0-8065-2466-9.
- Strong, Martin C. (2000). The Great Rock Discography (5th. ed.). Edinburgh, Scotland: Mojo Books. ISBN 1-84195-017-3.
