= Eric Clapton videography =

Eric Clapton video discography
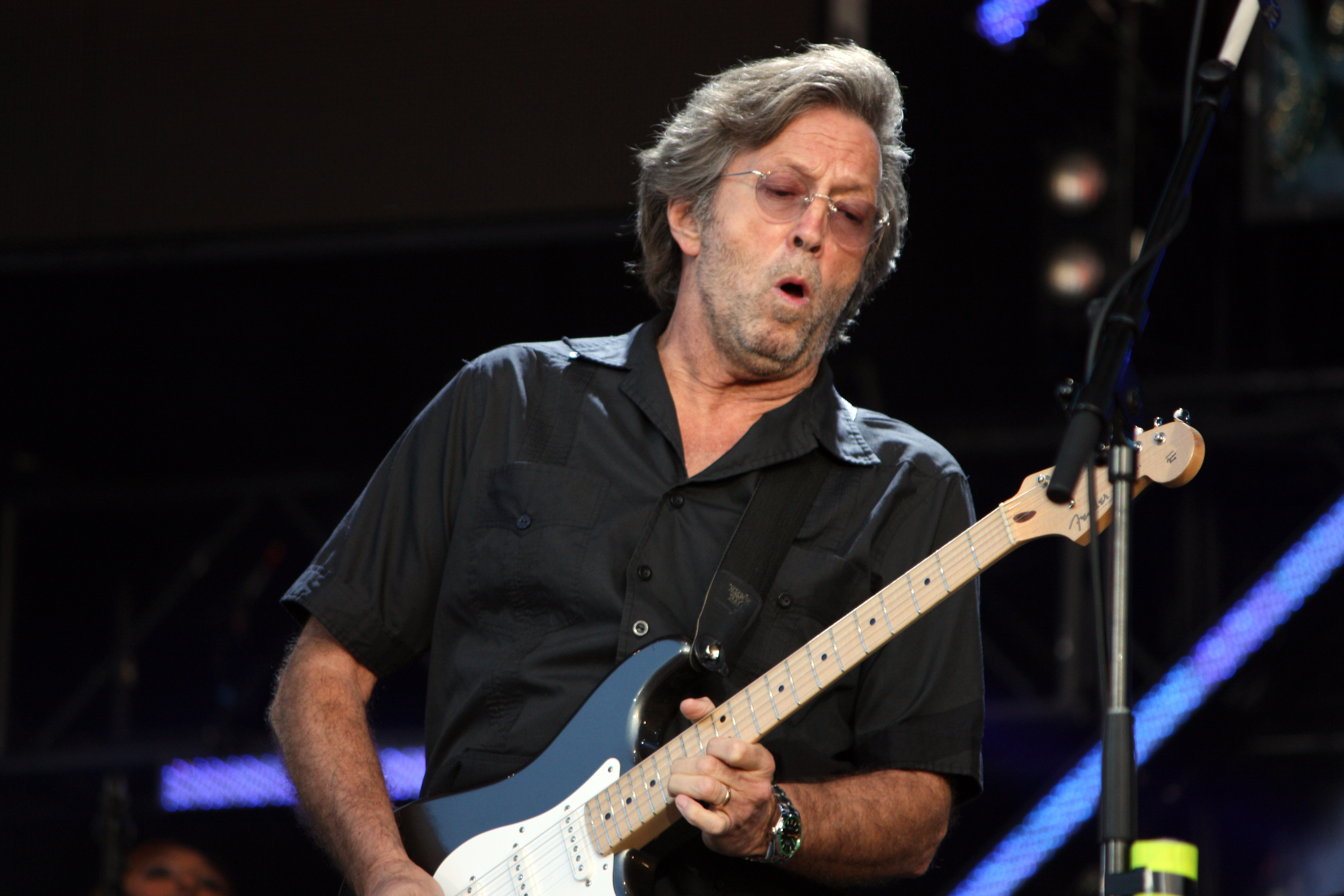
- Video albums: 22
- Music videos: 17

The English singer Eric Clapton has released 22 video albums and concert films as well as 17 music videos. His commercially most successful video releases are the DVDs of his Crossroads Guitar Festival series. His 2007 release sold over two million DVD and Blu-rays to date, making it one of the best-selling music video DVDs ever to be released. The 2004 Crossroads Guitar Festival DVD was certified 10-times Platinum by the Recording Industry Association of America. Clapton's video releases are popular all over the world, especially in North and South America, Europe and Oceania. Clapton's small number of music videos are similarly successful. Every music video Clapton has released, has been shown more than 30 weeks in succession on MTV, VH1, MuchMusic, MTV2 and Fuse TV – rarely has any other artist been broadcast that often on a music TV channel throughout their whole career.

== Video albums and concert films ==
Title and details	Chart Peaks										Certifications
Title and details	UK	AUS	AUT	BEL	FRA	ITA	NED	SWE	SWI	US	Certifications
Live 1986: Television Premiere: December 5, 1986	2	36	–	–	–	–	–	–	–	4	BPI: Gold; ARIA: Gold
The Cream of Eric Clapton: VHS Release: January 23, 1990	–	–	–	–	–	–	–	–	–	16	RIAA: Platinum
24 Nights: VHS Release: October 8, 1991	–	34	–	–	–	13	–	–	–	5	ARIA: Platinum; RIAA: Gold
Unplugged: Television Premiere: March 4, 1995	–	12	–	–	–	–	–	–	–	2	BPI: Gold; RIAA: Platinum; SNEP: Platinum
Live in Hyde Park: DVD Release: November 13, 2001	4	31	–	–	–	–	9	–	–	11	BPI: Gold; ARIA: Platinum; RIAA: Platinum
Clapton Chronicles: The Best of Eric Clapton	–	–	–	–	–	–	–	–	–	23	ARIA: Platinum; RIAA: Gold
In Concert: A Benefit for the Crossroads Centre at Antigua: Television Premiere: August 17, 1999; VHS Release: October 26, 1999	–	7	–	–	–	–	–		–	14	BPI: Gold; ARIA: 3× Platinum; RIAA: Platinum
One More Car, One More Rider: VHS Release: November 4, 2002	–	–	–	–	–	–	–		–	8	RIAA: Platinum
Crossroads Guitar Festival 2004: Television Premiere: December 1, 2004								4			BPI: Gold; RIAA: 10× Platinum; SNEP: Platinum
Sessions for Robert J: Television Premiere: May 22, 2005	–	–	–	–	–	–	–	–	–	21	
Legends: Live at Montreux 1997	–	–	–	–	–	–	–	–	–	–	
Live at Montreux 1986: Blu-ray Release: TBA	23	2	8	–	–	–	26	–	–	20	ARIA: Platinum; RIAA: Gold
Crossroads Guitar Festival 2007: Television Premiere: November 28, 2007	27	13	–	–	–	8	15		–	3	ARIA: Platinum; RIAA: 6× Platinum; SNEP: Gold
Live from Madison Square Garden: DVD Release: May 19, 2009; Television Premiere: May 28, 2009	3	10	3	6	–	2	6	—	—	1	RIAA: 2× Platinum
Crossroads Guitar Festival 2010: Cinema Release: July 27, 2010; Television Premiere: June 6, 2011	20	–	2	9	2	3	3	—	—	1	RIAA: 4× Platinum
Play the Blues: Live from Jazz at Lincoln Center	–	4	–	–	–	–	28	–	–	–	
Crossroads Guitar Festival 2013: Cinema Release: August 13, 2013	9	2	3	2	1	1	1		2	1	RIAA: Platinum
Planes, Trains and Eric: Television Premiere: November 27, 2014	3	4	4	8	5	12	3		4	1	
Slowhand at 70 – Live at the Royal Albert Hall: Television Premiere: October 19, 2015; Blu-ray Release: November 13, 2015; DVD Release: November 13, 2015	2	5	1		1	1	2	–	1	1	BPI: Gold
Crossroads Guitar Festival 2019: Television Premiere: October 20, 2020; Blu-ray Release: November 20, 2020; DVD Release: November 20, 2020	2	5	1		1	1	2	–	1	1	
The Lady in the Balcony: Lockdown Sessions: Blu-ray Release: November 12, 2021; DVD Release: November 12, 2021	—	—	—	9	—	10	—	39	—	13	
Nothing but the Blues: Blu-ray Release: June 24, 2022; DVD Release: June 24, 2022	—	—	—	—	—		—		—		
"–" denotes a release that did not chart or was not issued in that region.

== Music videos ==
=== Lead artist music videos ===
Title	Year	Monitor		Director
Title	Year	MTV	VH1	Director
"Forever Man"	1985	1	–	Lexi Godfrey
"She's Waiting"	1985	1	–	Jim Yukich
"It's in the Way That You Use It"	1986	1	–	Oley Sassone
"After Midnight"	1988	2	5	Larry Jordan
"Bad Love"	1989	3	5	Gavin Taylor
"Pretending"	1989	2	1	Caleb Deschanel
"Layla (Acoustic)" (Live Video)	1992	2	1	Milton Lage
"Running on Faith" (Live Video)	1992	2	1	Milton Lage
"Tears in Heaven"	1992	1	1	Lili Fini Zanuck
"Motherless Child"	1994	1	3	David Cameron
"Change the World"	1996	9	1	Peter Nydrle
"My Father's Eyes"	1998	23	6	Kevin Godley
"Pilgrim"	1998	–	–	Lili Fini Zanuck
"Blue Eyes Blue"	1999	28	19	Richard Goldstein
"Riding with the King" (featuring B.B. King)	2000	47	21	Michael Haussman
"I Ain't Gonna Stand for It"	2001	–	–	
"They Call Me the Breeze"	2014	–	–	

=== Collaboration efforts ===
Title	Year	Monitor		Director
Title	Year	MTV	VH1	Director
"Love Like a Rocket" (with Bob Geldof)	1986	–	–	
"Fight (No Matter How Long)" (with Bee Gees)	1988	–	–	
"I Wish It Would Rain Down" (with Phil Collins)	1990			Jim Yukich
"It's Probably Me" (with Sting)	1992	1	3	Richard Donner
"Runaway Train" (with Elton John)	1992	–	7	Denise Thorne
"Love Can Build a Bridge" (with Cher, Chrissie Hynde & Neneh Cherry)	1995	–	–	

== See also ==
- Eric Clapton albums discography
- Eric Clapton singles discography
