= List of awards and nominations received by Eric Clapton =

Eric Clapton awards and nominations
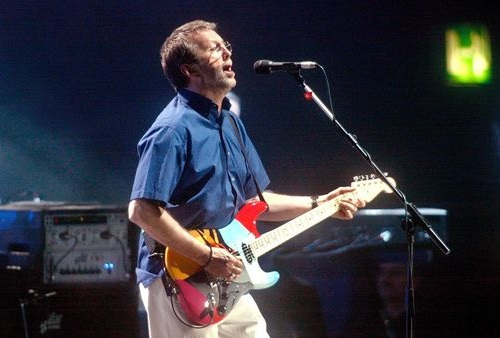
- Clapton performing in 2004
Awards and nominations
Award	Wins	Nominations

Totals (Note: Certain award groups do not simply award one winner. They acknowledge several different recipients, have runners-up, and have third place. Since this is a specific recognition and is different from losing an award, runner-up mentions are considered wins in this award tally. For simplification and to avoid errors, each award in this list has been presumed to have had a prior nomination.)
- Wins: 114
- Nominations: 47

This is a List of awards and nominations received by Eric Clapton.

== American Music Award ==
Year	Nominee/Work	Category/Award	Result	Ref.
1993	Himself	Favorite Pop/Rock Male Artist	Nominated	
1994	Himself	Favorite Pop/Rock Male Artist	Won	
1997	Himself	Favorite Pop/Rock Male Artist	Won	
1998	Himself	Favorite Pop/Rock Male Artist	Nominated	
1999	Himself	Favorite Pop/Rock Male Artist	Won	

== BAFTA Award ==
Year	Nominee/Work	Category/Award	Result	Ref.
1986	Edge of Darkness	Best Original Television Music	Won	

== Baloise Session Award ==
Year	Nominee/Work	Category/Award	Result	Ref.
2013	Himself	Lifetime Achievement Award	Won	

== Billboard Music Award ==
Year	Nominee/Work	Category/Award	Result	Ref.
1990	Himself	#1 Album Rock Tracks Artist	Won	
1994	Himself	Special Award for Artistic Excellence	Won	

== Blues Hall of Fame ==
Year	Nominee/Work	Category/Award	Result	Ref.
2015	Himself	Blues Hall of Fame	Won	

== BMI Film & TV Award ==
Year	Nominee/Work	Category/Award	Result	Ref.
1988	Lethal Weapon 1	BMI Film Music Award	Won	
1990	Lethal Weapon 2	BMI Film Music Award	Won	
1993	Lethal Weapon 3	BMI Film Music Award	Won	
1999	Lethal Weapon 4	BMI Film Music Award	Won	

== BMI Million Air Award ==
Year	Nominee/Work	Category/Award	Result	Ref.
1978	"Lay Down Sally"	1 Million Performances Award	Won	
1978	"Wonderful Tonight"	1 Million Performances Award	Won	
1979	"Wonderful Tonight"	2 Million Performances Award	Won	
1981	"I Can't Stand It"	1 Million Performances Award	Won	
2001	"Wonderful Tonight"	3 Million Performances Award	Won	
2002	"Layla" (All versions)	5 Million Performances Award	Won	
2004	"Lay Down Sally"	3 Million Performances Award	Won	
2005	"Layla" (All versions)	6 Million Performances Award	Won	
2005	"Tears in Heaven"	4 Million Performances Award	Won	
2005	"My Father's Eyes"	2 Million Performances Award	Won	
2006	"Wonderful Tonight"	4 Million Performances Award	Won	
2007	"Lay Down Sally"	4 Million Performances Award	Won	
2007	"Tears in Heaven"	5 Million Performances Award	Won	
2008	"Layla" (All versions)	7 Million Performances Award	Won	
2009	"Wonderful Tonight"	5 Million Performances Award	Won	
2009	"Layla" (All versions)	8 Million Performances Award	Won	
2010	"Wonderful Tonight"	6 Million Performances Award	Won	
2010	"Layla" (All versions)	9 Million Performances Award	Won	
2017	"Wonderful Tonight"	7 Million Performances Award	Won	

== BPI Award ==
Year	Nominee/Work	Category/Award	Result	Ref.
1987	Himself	Lifetime Achievement Award	Won	

== CableACE Award ==
Year	Nominee/Work	Category/Award	Result	Ref.
1989	The Second All-Star Rock Concert	Best Performance in a Music Special	Nominated	
1993	Unplugged (Concert film)	Best Performance in a Music Special or Series	Nominated	

== DGA Television Award ==
Year	Nominee/Work	Category/Award	Result	Ref.
2005	Crossroads Guitar Festival 2004	DGA Television Award – Musical/Variety	Nominated	

== Echo Music Prize ==
Year	Nominee/Work	Category/Award	Result	Ref.
1995	Himself (From the Cradle)	International Artist of the Year – Echo Pop	Nominated	
1999	Himself (Pilgrim)	International Artist of the Year – Echo Pop	Nominated	
2002	Himself (Reptile)	International Artist of the Year – Echo Pop	Nominated	
2012	Live from Jazz at Lincoln Center	Bestseller of the Year – Echo Jazz	Won	
2015	Himself (The Breeze: An Appreciation of JJ Cale)	International Artist Rock/Pop Music – Echo	Nominated	

== Golden Globe Award ==
Year	Nominee/Work	Category/Award	Result	Ref.
1992	"Tears in Heaven"	Best Original Song – Motion Picture	Nominated	

== GQ Award ==
Year	Nominee/Work	Category/Award	Result	Ref.
1999	Himself	Man of the Year Award for Music	Won	

== Grammy Award ==
Year	Nominee/Work	Category/Award	Result	Ref.
1969	Cream	Best New Artist of the Year	Nominated	
1973	The Concert for Bangladesh	Album of the Year	Won	
1986	Back to the Future	Best Album of Original Score	Nominated	
1989	"After Midnight"	Best Male Rock Vocal Performance	Nominated	
1991	"Bad Love"	Best Male Rock Vocal Performance	Won	
1992	24 Nights	Best Solo Rock Vocal Performance	Nominated	
1993	"Layla"	Best Rock Song	Won	
1993	"Tears in Heaven"	Record of the Year	Won	
1993	Unplugged	Album of the Year	Won	
1993	"Tears in Heaven"	Song of the Year	Won	
1993	"Tears in Heaven"	Best Male Pop Vocal Performance	Won	
1993	Unplugged	Best Male Rock Vocal Performance	Won	
1993	"It's Probably Me"	Best Song Written for a Motion Picture/Television	Nominated	
1993	"Tears in Heaven"	Best Song Written for a Motion Picture/Television	Nominated	
1993	Rush	Best Instrumental Composition for a Motion Picture/Television	Nominated	
1994	"My Back Pages"	Best Rock Performance by a Duo or Group with Vocal	Nominated	
1995	From the Cradle	Best Traditional Blues Album	Won	
1995	From the Cradle	Album of the Year	Nominated	
1997	"Change the World"	Record of the Year	Won	
1997	"Change the World"	Best Male Pop Vocal Performance	Won	
1997	"SRV Shuffle"	Best Rock Instrumental Performance	Won	
1997	"Ain't Gone 'n' Give Up on Love"	Best Male Rock Vocal Performance	Nominated	
1999	"My Father's Eyes"	Best Male Pop Vocal Performance	Won	
1999	Pilgrim	Best Pop Album	Nominated	
2000	"The Calling"	Best Rock Instrumental Performance	Won	
2001	Riding with the King	Best Traditional Blues Album	Won	
2002	"Reptile"	Best Pop Instrumental Performance	Won	
2002	"Superman Inside"	Best Male Rock Vocal Performance	Nominated	
2005	"Something"	Best Pop Collaboration with Vocals	Nominated	
2005	Me and Mr. Johnson	Best Traditional Blues Album	Nominated	
2006	"Revolution"	Best Solo Rock Vocal Performance	Nominated	
2007	"You Are So Beautiful"	Best Traditional R&B Vocal Performance	Nominated	
2008	The Road to Escondido	Best Contemporary Blues Album	Won	
2010	"Can't Find My Way Home"	Best Rock Performance by a Duo or Group with Vocal	Nominated	
2010	Live from Madison Square Garden	Best Rock Album	Nominated	
2011	"Run Back to Your Side"	Best Solo Rock Vocal Performance	Nominated	

== Grammy Hall of Fame ==
Year	Nominee/Work	Category/Award	Result	Ref.
1998	"Layla" (Derek and the Dominos)	Historical/Lasting Rock Single	Won	
1999	Disraeli Gears (Cream)	Historical/Lasting Rock Album	Won	
2000	Layla and Other Assorted Love Songs (Dominos)	Historical/Lasting Rock Album	Won	
2003	"I Shot the Sheriff" (Solo artist version)	Historical/Lasting Rock Single	Won	
2021	Blues Breakers with Eric Clapton (John Mayall & the Bluesbreakers)	Historical/Lasting Rock Album	Nominated	

== Grammy Lifetime Achievement Award ==
Year	Nominee/Work	Category/Award	Result	Ref.
2006	Himself	Lifetime Achievement Award	Won	

== IFMCA Award ==
Year	Nominee/Work	Category/Award	Result	Ref.
2013	Lethal Weapon Soundtrack Collection	IFMCA Award	Won	
2014	Lethal Weapon Soundtrack Collection	IFMCA Award	Won	

== International Rock Award ==
Year	Nominee/Work	Category/Award	Result	Ref.
1989	Himself	Best Guitarist Award	Won	
1990	Himself	Living Legend Award	Won	

== Ivor Novello Award ==
Year	Nominee/Work	Category/Award	Result	Ref.
1971	"Layla" (Derek and the Dominos)	Outstanding Contribution to Music	Won	
1986	Edge of Darkness	Best Theme from a Television or Radio Production	Won	
1990	"Travelling East"	Best Film Theme or Song	Nominated	
1992	Himself	Lifetime Achievement Award	Won	
1993	"Tears in Heaven"	Best Film Theme or Song	Won	
1993	"Tears in Heaven"	Best Song Musically and Lyrically	Nominated	
1993	"Tears in Heaven"	International Hit of the Year	Nominated	
1994	"Tears in Heaven"	PRS Most Performed Work	Nominated	

== Melody Maker Award ==
Year	Nominee/Work	Category/Award	Result	Ref.
1969	Himself	Best International Musician	Won	

== MTV Movie & TV Award ==
Year	Nominee/Work	Category/Award	Result	Ref.
1992	"Tears in Heaven"	MTV Movie Award	Nominated	
1993	"It's Probably Me"	MTV Movie Award	Nominated	
1997	"Change the World"	MTV Movie Award	Nominated	

== MTV Video Music Award ==
Year	Nominee/Work	Category/Award	Result	Ref.
1987	"It's in the Way That You Use It"	Best Video from a Film	Nominated	
1992	"Tears in Heaven"	Best Male Video	Won	
1992	"Tears in Heaven"	Best Video from a Film	Nominated	
1992	"Tears in Heaven"	Best Cinematography in a Video	Nominated	
1996	"Change the World"	Best Cinematography in a Video	Nominated	
1998	"My Father's Eyes"	Best Male Video	Nominated	

== Music Assistance Program ==
Year	Nominee/Work	Category/Award	Result	Ref.
1999	Himself (Crossroads Centre)	Stevie Ray Vaughan Award	Won	

== OFTA Film Award ==
Year	Nominee/Work	Category/Award	Result	Ref.
1996	"Change the World"	Best Male Solo Song	Won	
1996	"Change the World"	Song of the Year	Nominated	
1996	"Change the World"	Best Adapted Song	Nominated	
1997	"Change the World"	Best Adapted Song	Nominated	

== Primetime Emmy Award ==
Year	Nominee/Work	Category/Award	Result	Ref.
1995	Nothing but the Blues	Outstanding Cultural Program	Nominated	
2005	Crossroads Guitar Festival 2004	Outstanding Picture Editing for a Special	Won	
2005	Crossroads Guitar Festival 2004	Outstanding Technical Direction	Nominated	
2005	Crossroads Guitar Festival 2004	Outstanding Sound Mixing	Nominated	
2005	Crossroads Guitar Festival 2004	Outstanding Lighting Direction	Nominated	
2008	Crossroads Guitar Festival 2007	Outstanding Special Class – Variety, Music, Comedy Program	Won	

== Q Award ==
Year	Nominee/Work	Category/Award	Result	Ref.
1995	Himself	Merit Award	Won	

== Robert Musel Award ==
Year	Nominee/Work	Category/Award	Result	Ref.
1999	"My Father's Eyes"	Most Performed Song of the Year	Won	

== Rock and Roll Hall of Fame ==
Year	Nominee/Work	Category/Award	Result	Ref.
1992	Himself (with The Yardbirds)	Rock and Roll Hall of Fame	Won	
1993	Himself (with Cream)	Rock and Roll Hall of Fame	Won	
2000	Himself (Solo career)	Rock and Roll Hall of Fame	Won	
2000	Himself	Star on Rock and Roll Walk	Won	

== Rock Walk Award ==
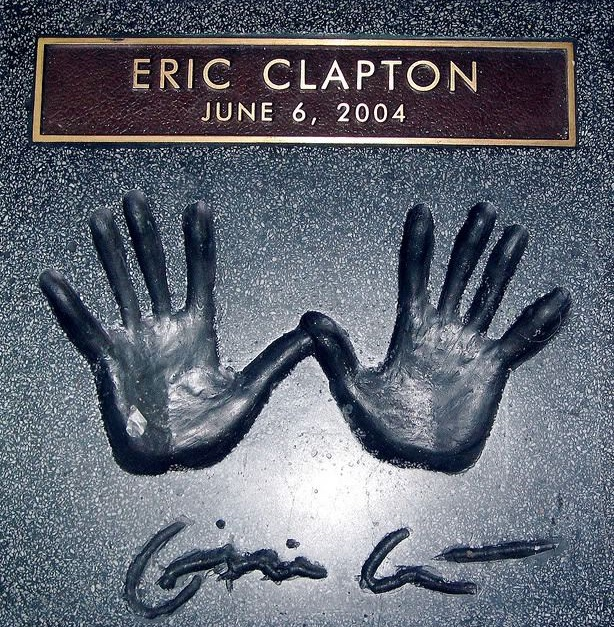
Clapton's handprints on the Guitar Center Rock Walk in 2004.

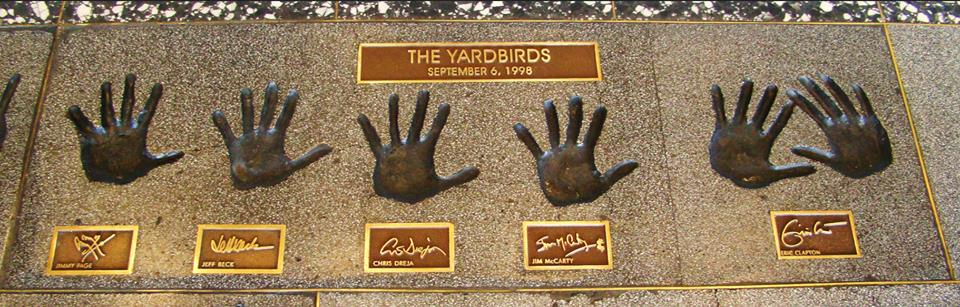
Handprints of The Yardbirds (1998).

Year	Nominee/Work	Category/Award	Result	Ref.
1998	Himself (with The Yardbirds)	Significant Contribution to the History of Music	Won	
2004	Himself (as a Solo artist)	Significant Contribution to the History of Music	Won	
2004	Himself (with Cream)	Significant Contribution to the History of Music	Won	

== Silver Clef Award ==
Year	Nominee/Work	Category/Award	Result	Ref.
1983	Himself	Outstanding Achievement in the World of British Music	Won	

== Songwriters Hall of Fame ==
Year	Nominee/Work	Category/Award	Result	Ref.
2001	Himself	Songwriters Hall of Fame	Won	

== TVZ Award ==
Year	Nominee/Work	Category/Award	Result	Ref.
1997	Himself	Best International Male Singer	Won	

== W.C. Handy Award ==
Year	Nominee/Work	Category/Award	Result	Ref.
1995	Himself	Crossover Artist of the Year	Won	
2001	Riding with the King	Contemporary Album of the Year	Won	

== World Music Award ==
Year	Nominee/Work	Category/Award	Result	Ref.
1993	Himself	Best-Selling British Recording Artist of the Year	Won	
1993	Himself	Best-Selling Rock Artist of the Year	Won	
1994	Himself	Best-Selling British Recording Artist of the Year	Won	

== Other awards and honours ==
=== Royal honours ===
Year	Nominee/Work	Category/Award	Result	Ref.
1988	Himself	Honored by Prince Charles for 25 years in the music industry	Won	
1995	Himself	Officer of the Order of the British Empire (OBE)		
2004	Himself	Commander of the Order of the British Empire (CBE)		
2017	Himself	Commandeur de Ordre des Arts et des Lettres (COAL)		

=== Concert awards ===
Year	Nominee/Work	Category/Award	Result	Ref.
1988	Himself	Concert award at the Palace of Auburn Hills	Won	
1990	Himself	Sold Out Award: Birmingham NEC, Royal Albert Hall	Won	
1990	Himself	Sold Out Award: Alpine Valley Music Theater	Won	
1991	Himself	Presented with a key to a box at the Royal Albert Hall	Won	
1992	Himself	Name engraved on the outside wall of The Cavern Club	Won	
1993	Himself	Sold Out Award: 12 sell-outs at the Royal Albert Hall	Won	
2002	Himself	Lunas del Auditorio Award – Best Live Act in Mexico	Won	
2009	Himself	Recognized by the Royal Albert Hall for 150 shows	Won	
2010	Himself	Star on road "Yaşayan Efsaneler" for Istanbul show	Won	
2014	Himself	Sold Out Award for a concert at the SAP Arena	Won	
2014	Himself	Plaque at The Downstairs Club (later Le Disque a Go! Go!)	Won	
2017	Himself	Award for over 175 shows at the Royal Albert Hall	Won	
2018	Himself	Honorary plaque at the Royal Albert Hall for over 200 shows	Won	

=== Ranking lists ===
Year	Nominee/Work	Category/Award	Result	Ref.
2000	Unplugged	Best British Albums of All Time (Q Magazine)	#71	
2001	"Change the World"	Songs of the Century (RIAA)	#270	
2003	Slowhand	500 Greatest Albums of All Time (Rolling Stone)	#325	
2003	461 Ocean Boulevard	500 Greatest Albums of All Time (Rolling Stone)	#409	
2004	"Tears in Heaven"	500 Greatest Songs of All Time (Rolling Stone)	#353	
2011	Himself	100 Greatest Artists of All Time (Rolling Stone)	#53	
2011	Unplugged	Best Guitar Albums of 1992 (Guitar World)	#9	

=== Other awards ===
Year	Nominee/Work	Category/Award	Result	Ref.
1970	Himself	Music Life Magazine Award	Won	
1975	Himself	Music Life Popularity Award	Won	
1988	Crossroads	Highest-Ever Charting Box Set	Won	
1988	Crossroads	First-Ever Platinum-selling Box Set	Won	
1988	Crossroads	First-Ever Double Platinum-selling Box Set	Won	
1989	Crossroads	Grammy Participation – Best Historical Album	Won	
1989	Crossroads	Grammy Participation – Best Album Notes	Won	
1991	Himself	Music Therapy Awards	Won	
1993	Himself	Composer's Gold Award	Won	
1993	Himself	(unknown)	Won	
1995	Himself	Evian Health Award	Won	
2004	Himself	Statue at the "Crossroads" crossing	Won	
2006	Back Home	Grammy Participation – Best Engineered Album	Won	
