= Live 1986 =

- DVD cover
- Directed by: Gavin Taylor
- Produced by: Roger Forrester
- Starring: Eric Clapton
- Release date: 1987 (VHS)
- Running time: 58 minutes
- Country: United Kingdom
- Language: English

Live 1986, also known as Eric Clapton & Friends Live 1986 or The Eric Clapton concert, is a concert film released by the British rock musician Eric Clapton. It was originally released on VHS in 1987 and later re-released on DVD in 2003. In addition to the video release, a compact disc was released in 2007. The concert was recorded at the National Exhibition Centre in Birmingham on 15 July 1986.

== Reception ==
Music critic Anneke Brüning notes that the release features a shorter DVD track listing than its rival Live at Montreux 1986, but thinks the Live 1986 release is not less interesting. The release reached number two on the British music video charts, compiled by the Official Charts Company. Both the album and video release were certified with a gold certification award in the United Kingdom. Other golden discs were presented to Clapton for outstanding sales figures in Australia, Brazil and Canada.

== Track listing ==
1. "Crossroads" (Robert Johnson)
2. "White Room" (Jack Bruce · Pete Brown)
3. "Run" (Eric Clapton)
4. "Miss You" (Eric Clapton · Greg Phillinganes · Bobby Colomby)
5. "Tearing Us Apart" (Eric Clapton · Greg Phillinganes)
6. "Holy Mother" (Eric Clapton · Stephen Bishop)
7. "In the Air Tonight" (Phil Collins)
8. "Layla" (Eric Clapton · Jim Gordon)
9. "Sunshine of Your Love" (Eric Clapton · Jack Bruce · Pete Brown)

== Personnel ==
- Eric Clapton – Electric guitar · Lead vocals
- Greg Phillinganes – Keyboard · Background vocals
- Phil Collins – Drums · Vocals
- Nathan East – Bass guitar · Background vocals

== Chart positions ==
=== Weekly charts ===
Chart (1988–2013)	Peak position
Australian Music DVD (ARIA)	36
Portuguese Music DVD (AFP)	22
UK Music DVD (OCC)	2
US Music DVD (Billboard)	4

== Certifications ==
Region	Certification	Certified units/sales
Australia (ARIA)	Gold	7,500^{^}
Canada (Music Canada)	Gold	5,000^{^}
United Kingdom (BPI)	Gold	25,000^{^}
^{^} Shipments figures based on certification alone.
