= Il burbero =

1986 film by Franco Castellano and Giuseppe Moccia

- Italian theatrical release poster by Renato Casaro
- Directed by: Castellano & Pipolo
- Written by: Castellano & Pipolo
- Produced by: Mario Cecchi Gori; Vittorio Cecchi Gori
- Starring: Adriano Celentano; Debra Feuer; Jean Sorel; Mattia Sbragia; Angela Finocchiaro; Peppe Lanzetta; Percy Hogan
- Cinematography: Alfio Contini
- Edited by: Antonio Siciliano
- Music by: Detto Mariano
- Production companies: Alexandra Film; C.G. Silver Film
- Distributed by: CDI Compagnia Distribuzione Internazionale
- Release date: December 20, 1986 (Italy)
- Running time: 91 minutes
- Country: Italy
- Language: Italian

Il burbero (lit. 'The Gruff') is a 1986 Italian comedy film directed by the duo Castellano & Pipolo.

== Plot ==
Mary Cimino, a waitress from New York, receives a call from her Italian husband Giulio, who tells her that he has acquired unexpected wealth and requests her immediate presence in Florence, Italy. She rushes to leave by plane from America, but at the airport she is told that no direct flight to Florence is available, only to Pisa. While looking for a way to get a seat, she encounters the Italian lawyer Tito Torrisi, who has reserved himself an empty seat for privacy. With much persuasion, she manages to coax him into granting her the empty seat, and during her journey she becomes both attracted to his ruggedly handsome looks and angered by his surly personality.

Upon their arrival in Italy, Mary's and Tito's suitcases get mixed up, and when Mary reaches her hotel, she is ambushed and left tied up by an unknown assailant, who ransacks the suitcase in search for something. Tito arrives to reclaim his suitcase, thereby accidentally pushing the attacker from the windowsill he has hidden himself on, and is persuaded by Mary to help her in finding out the reason for the attack. They both set out to meet Giulio, but when Mary meets him, he pretends not to recognize her, and is found to be pursued by three sinister men, one of them being Mary's assailant from the hotel. When Giulio is cornered, he swallows a pill and collapses, dead; in his wallet, the three men find a receipt for a registered letter.

Desperate to find Giulio, but unable to stay in her hotel any longer because it was rented for only a limited period by her husband, Mary turns to Tito for help. Since she has left the address of his office at the hotel, Tito is informed about Giulio's demise, and after taking Mary to the coroner to identify the body, he gives her a return ticket to New York. Mary prepares to leave, but is once again kidnapped by Giulio's mysterious assailants, just at the very moment when a registered letter is delivered for her in Tito's office. Mary is forced to call Tito and ask him to bring the letter to her; after the gangsters receive the letter, they lock their prisoners in, but Tito's wits gets them out of their predicament.

The letter contains a map sketch possibly leading to the treasure Giulio has told Mary about, which was revealed by the gangsters to be the loot from a grand bank robbery they and Giulio have committed, only for Giulio to betray his partners and claiming the money for himself. Intrigued by the case, Tito accompanies Mary on her search for it, and they follow the clues on the map to Siena, under constant pursuit by the three men. Finally they arrive at the location of the final clue, an exhibition of six plaster statues - replicas of the bronze Perseus statue by Benvenuto Cellini - inside the Palazzo Tolomei. The clue, however, turns out to be a trap, which leaves the three gangsters locked inside a secret dungeon.

Mystified by this seemingly aimless treasure hunt, Tito decides to secretly exhume Giulio's body, but inside the coffin he and Mary find the coroner's body instead. Tito concludes that Giulio has ingested a drug which has put him into suspended animation instead of killing him, then had himself revived by the coroner, whom he killed in order to conceal his survival. When Mary begins to cry over her losses and her tears drench Giulio's letter, Tito discovers that the letter is a camouflaged painting, in which Giulio has invested the robbery loot and is thus the treasure they have been searching for; Mary was just used to lure his ex-accomplices into a trap. Right at that moment, Giulio appears and claims the picture at gunpoint, then invites Mary to accompany him. Mary, now totally in love with Tito and repulsed by Giulio's duplicity, refuses outright, so Giulio locks them inside the office and flees; but Tito gets himself and Mary out, and takes up pursuit. He catches Giulio aboard his train to Montecarlo, but is in turn caught by Giulio, who attempts to force him to drink his asphyxiation drug. However, Tito tricks Giulio into taking the drug himself instead and thus dying once again.

The next morning, Tito calls Mary to inform her that he has sold the painting and is spending all the money for himself. Heartbroken, Mary takes the next plane back to New York, but on the flight she encounters Tito again, who informs her that he has actually fallen in love with her as well. He also knew about her connection to Giulio, since he was hired by an insurance company to find the robbers and their loot, and had thus deliberately initiated their first encounter in order to track Giulio down. With the substantial reward for his successful recovery of the loot in his pocket, he reconciles with Mary and accompanies her to a new life together.

== Cast ==
- Adriano Celentano: Tito Torrisi
- Debra Feuer: Mary Cimino
- Jean Sorel: Giulio Macchiavelli
- Angela Finocchiaro: Emilia, Tito's secretary
- Mattia Sbragia: killer chief
- Percy Hogan: killer
- Luigi Bonos: guardia
- Iaia Forte

== Release ==
Il burbero was released theatrically in Italy on December 20, 1986 across several cities including Rome, Padua, Bologna, Cagliari, and Genoa.
