= Peppe Lanzetta =

Italian actor

- Born: 6 February 1956 (age 70); Naples, Italy
- Occupation: Actor
- Years active: 1985–present
- Height: 1.70 m (5 ft 7 in)

Peppe Lanzetta (born 6 February 1956) is an Italian actor. He appeared in more than twenty films since 1985.

== Filmography ==
Year	Title	Role	Notes
1985	Blues metropolitano		
1986	The Professor	L'intrattenitore dei rinfreschi	
1986	Grandi magazzini	Giuseppe	
1986	Il burbero	Malfattore	
1988	32 dicembre	Il fabbricante di fuochi	(segment "I penultimi fuochi")
1989	Francesco	In the Perugia Prison	
1989	Street Kids	Antonio	
1995	Nasty Love		
1998	Rehearsals for War	Silvano	
1999	Tifosi	Barracuda	
1999	Non lo sappiamo ancora		
2000	Scarlet Diva	Maurizio	Uncredited
2000	Aitanic		
2001	One Man Up	Salvatore	
2003	Gli indesiderabili	Saver Li Fonzi	
2005	All the Invisible Children	Stolen Watch Buyer	(segment "Ciro")
2008	Marcello Marcello	Rozzani	
2009	Napoli, Napoli, Napoli	Padre di Lucia	
2013	Take Five	'O Sciomèn	
2015	Spectre	Lorenzo	
2017	Due soldati		
