= Meanwhile (Eric Clapton album) =

Studio album by Eric Clapton
- Released: 4 October 2024
- Recorded: 2020–2024
- Genre: Blues rock
- Length: 64:19
- Label: Bushbranch; Surfdog
- Producer: Simon Climie

Eric Clapton chronology
To Save a Child: An Intimate Live Concert (2024)	Meanwhile (2024)

Singles from Meanwhile
- 1. "Stand and Deliver" Released: 18 December 2020; 2. "The Rebels" Released: 11 June 2021; 3. "This Has Gotta Stop" Released: 27 August 2021; 4. "Heart of a Child" Released: 24 December 2021; 5. "Pompous Fool" Released: 7 July 2022; 6. "Moon River" Released: 12 May 2023; 7. "How Could We Know" Released: 14 July 2023; 8. "Always on My Mind" Released: 15 September 2023; 9. "One Woman" Released: 20 September 2024

Meanwhile is the twenty-second solo studio album by Eric Clapton. It was released on 4 October 2024 through Bushbranch Records/Surfdog Records. Along with six new tracks, the album also features eight songs Clapton has previously released as singles beginning from 2020, including collaborations with Van Morrison and Jeff Beck.

== Background ==
This record marks Clapton's first studio album since Happy Xmas in 2018, and his first non-holiday studio album since I Still Do in 2016. The artist worked on the album for three years in tandem with British musician and frequent collaborator Simon Climie, who serves as a producer on the entire album and also appears as a featured artist on the track "How Could We Know". The album consists mostly of Clapton's single output starting from December 2020. Clapton has said that the album itself consists of "all these sort of slightly political comments mixed up with songs that are just songs."

== Release ==
The first of the album's tracks to be released, "Stand and Deliver", "The Rebels", and "This Has Gotta Stop", were the parts of a series of collaborations Clapton had with musician Van Morrison which the pair released under the moniker Slowhand & Van. The three songs were released during the COVID-19 pandemic, with the first and the third tracks garnering controversy due to their anti-mask, anti-lockdown, and anti-vaccine sentiments in light of the health crisis. The second of the series was a duet version of the track "Where Have All the Rebels Gone?" from Morrison's album Latest Record Project, Volume 1, his newest record at the time.

The next song, "Heart of a Child", co-written by Clapton and Italian architect Robin Monotti Graziadei, was released on Christmas Eve of 2021. "Pompous Fool", another song written by the pair, came out on 7 July 2022. This release coincided with the resignation of British Prime Minister Boris Johnson, leading some to believe that Clapton, who had criticized Johnson in the past, wrote the song about the politician.

Clapton went on to collaborate with fellow guitarist Jeff Beck on a cover of "Moon River", which was released on 15 May 2023, shortly after Beck's passing four months prior. The cover would also receive a vinyl release on 14 July as a double A-side single, with "How Could We Know" serving as the other song on the single. The latter track features Judith Hill, Simon Climie, and Daniel Santiago.

In honor of country singer Willie Nelson's 90th birthday, Clapton teamed up with American musician Bradley Walker to cover the country standard "Always on My Mind", a song that Nelson famously covered in 1982. The new cover was released 15 September 2023.

In an interview with the Real Music Observer during May 2024, Clapton first revealed the album, its title, and its prospective release date of autumn that year. On 20 September 2024, the album was officially announced, with the artist also releasing the new song "One Woman" alongside the news. Five unreleased songs from the album, namely "Sam Hall", "Smile", "The Call", "You've Changed", and "Misfortune", were also premiered on Sirius XM Radio's Deep Tracks channel, with one aired every day from 23 to 27 September 2024.

Meanwhile was released online on 4 October 2024. Physical vinyl and CD editions of the album followed on 24 January 2025.

== Track listing ==
All tracks are produced by Simon Climie, except where noted.

Meanwhile track listing
No.	Title	Writer(s)	Producer(s)	Length
1.	"Pompous Fool"	Eric Clapton; Robin Monotti		4:45
2.	"Heart of a Child"	Clapton; Monotti		7:04
3.	"Moon River" (with Jeff Beck)	Henry Mancini; Johnny Mercer		5:06
4.	"Sam Hall"	Traditional	Climie; Clapton; Jerry Douglas	5:27
5.	"Smile"	Charlie Chaplin; Geoffrey Parsons; John Turner		3:46
6.	"Always on My Mind" (with Bradley Walker)	Wayne Carson Thompson		3:37
7.	"One Woman"	John Bettis; Climie		4:50
8.	"The Rebels" (with Van Morrison)	Van Morrison		4:08
9.	"The Call"	Bob Neuwirth		5:07
10.	"How Could We Know" (with Judith Hill, featuring Simon Climie and Daniel Santiago)	Dennis Morgan; Climie		4:19
11.	"This Has Gotta Stop" (with Van Morrison)	Clapton		4:23
12.	"Stand and Deliver" (featuring Van Morrison)	Morrison		4:30
13.	"You've Changed"	Chuck Berry		3:52
14.	"Misfortune"	Clapton; Richard Lewis		3:25
Total length:				64:19

== Personnel ==
Credits adapted from the album's Apple Music release.

Musicians

- Eric Clapton – lead vocals (tracks 1–9, 11–14), electric guitar (1–9, 11–14), acoustic guitar (10)
- Sonny Emory – drums (tracks 1–3, 5, 7, 9, 10–14)
- Nathan East – bass guitar (tracks 1–3, 5, 7–14)
- Sharon White – backing vocals (tracks 1–3, 5, 7, 10–12)
- Paul Carrack – organ (tracks 1, 3, 7)
- Walt Richmond – piano (tracks 1, 3)
- Simon Climie – keyboards (tracks 2, 3, 5, 7, 9, 10, 11, 13), drum programming (2, 5, 7, 8), tambourine (8), lead vocals (10), piano (10), organ (12)
- Dirk Powell – mandolin (track 2)
- Daniel Santiago – acoustic guitar (tracks 2, 7, 10)
- Pedro Martins – electric guitar (tracks 2, 7)
- Katie Kissoon – backing vocals (track 2)
- Nick Ingman – strings (tracks 2, 5, 13)
- Everton Nelson – strings (tracks 2, 5)
- Jeff Beck – guitar (track 3)
- Jerry Douglas – Dobro (tracks 4, 6)
- Aly Bain – fiddle (tracks 4, 6)
- Phil Cunningham – piano (tracks 4, 6)
- John Doyle – electric guitar (tracks 4, 6)
- Daniel Kimbro – double bass (tracks 4, 6)
- James MacIntosh – drums (tracks 4, 6)
- Mike McGoldrick – fiddle (tracks 4, 6)
- John McCusker – fiddle (tracks 4, 6)
- Ron Wood – electric guitar (tracks 4, 6)
- Tim Carmon – organ (tracks 5, 7, 9, 10, 13, 14)
- Bradley Walker – lead vocals (track 6)
- Van Morrison – lead vocals (track 8, 11), harmonica (8), saxophone (11)
- Chris Stainton – piano (track 8)
- Steve Gadd – drums (track 8)
- David Mansfield – piano (track 9)
- Judith Hill – lead vocals (track 10)
- Luke Potashnick – electric guitar (track 10)
- Toby Baker – keyboards, piano (track 10)
- Mateo Laboriel – keyboards (track 10)
- Michelle John – backing vocals (track 10)
- Michael Thompson – electric guitar (track 10), acoustic guitar (10)

Production

- Simon Climie – producer
- Eric Clapton – producer (tracks 4, 6)
- Jerry Douglas – producer (tracks 4, 6)

== Charts ==
Chart performance for Meanwhile
Chart (2024–2025)	Peak position
Austrian Albums (Ö3 Austria)	4
Belgian Albums (Ultratop Flanders)	170
Belgian Albums (Ultratop Wallonia)	26
Croatian International Albums (HDU)	25
French Albums (SNEP)	91
German Albums (Offizielle Top 100)	5
Hungarian Physical Albums (MAHASZ)	23
Italian Albums (FIMI)	64
Japanese Albums (Oricon)	17
Japanese Combined Albums (Oricon)	34
Japanese Hot Albums (Billboard Japan)	58
Polish Albums (ZPAV)	19
Scottish Albums (OCC)	11
Swiss Albums (Schweizer Hitparade)	4
UK Album Downloads (OCC)	19
UK Americana Albums (OCC)	19
UK Jazz & Blues Albums (OCC)	5
US Top Blues Albums (Billboard)	1
