= Homeboy (film) =

1988 film by Michael Seresin

- Movie poster of Homeboy
- Directed by: Michael Seresin
- Written by: Mickey Rourke
- Produced by: Alan Marshall; Elliott Kastner
- Starring: Mickey Rourke; Christopher Walken; Debra Feuer
- Cinematography: Gale Tattersall
- Edited by: Ray Lovejoy
- Music by: Eric Clapton; Michael Kamen
- Distributed by: Carolco Pictures; Tristar Pictures; (Sony Pictures Entertainment)
- Release date: September 15, 1988
- Running time: 115 min.
- Country: United States
- Language: English

Homeboy is a 1988 drama film, directed by Michael Seresin. It was written by and stars Mickey Rourke in the role of self-destructive cowboy/boxer Johnny Walker. Christopher Walken also stars as Walker's slightly corrupt promoter who encourages him to fight while hiding from him the fact that one more punch in the wrong place would kill him. The film was briefly released in some theatres in 1988 by TriStar through their distribution deal with Carolco, but was more widely seen on home video shortly after. Lionsgate reissued it on DVD on September 1, 2009. Shout Factory released the film on Blu-ray in 2020.

== Plot ==
Johnny Walker (Mickey Rourke) is a down-and-out boxer with brain damage who has recently moved into a sea-side resort. He falls in love with Ruby (Debra Feuer), a carnival owner with whom he shares much in common. He also befriends Wesley Pendergrass (Christopher Walken), a corrupt promoter. Wesley and Johnny form a strong friendship, and it's clear that Johnny comes to idolize Wesley who wants to use Johnny as muscle in a robbery and asks for his help. Johnny has to choose between the love of Ruby or the friendship of Wesley.

== Cast ==
- Mickey Rourke as Johnny Walker
- Christopher Walken as Wesley Pendergass
- Debra Feuer as Ruby
- Thomas Quinn as Lou
- Kevin Conway as Grazziano
- Antony Alda as Ray
- Jon Polito as Moe Fingers
- Bill Slayton as Bill
- David Albert Taylor as Cannonball
- Joseph Ragno as Cotten's Trainer
- Matthew Lewis as Cotten
- Willy DeVille as Moe's Bodyguard
- Rubén Blades as Doctor
- Sam Gray as Barber
- Dondre Whitfield as Billy Harrison
- Stephen Baldwin as Luna Park Drunk
- Michael Buffer as Ring Announcer
- Larry Hazzard as referee

== Production ==
Exterior shots in Asbury Park include the boardwalk, the beach, Paramount Theatre, Cookman Avenue. Shots in Belmar include Alfred's Ice Cream Cafe and Pied Piper Ice Cream. Interior shots in Asbury Park include the Convention Hall and Belmar Barber Shop in Belmar. The Tillie mural and the Palace Amusements building can be seen in the background, a staple of Asbury Park and its culture. During the boxing scenes, the Convention Hall is used as the venue. This is the first of two times Rourke used the famed venue in films, the second was for 2008's The Wrestler.

Christopher Walken told Film Comment in August 1992:

Mickey Rourke and I were in Heaven's Gate together; he had this tiny part and I was playing whatsisname. We were sitting up there in the mountains talking about...dinosaurs. And I told him about this thing I had read in some science magazine, that there's a theory that dinosaurs really never disappeared at all. That in fact all they did was get smaller and smaller, their scales turned into feathers and they flew away -- and that in fact dinosaurs are still with us, they're just birds. And Mickey said, "That's interesting", and he started telling me about this movie that he was going to do someday about a boxer and it was called 'Homeboy'. You know, I remember also he told me at the time, "There's this guy, the fighter's manager, and you're gonna play this part". I said, "Okay, Mickey, let's go". So almost ten years went by and there we were making it. And I said to him, "Why don't I tell that story about the birds and dinosaurs?" He said, "Right". And there is that scene at the beach with all the seagulls, talking about dinosaurs. It's completely disconnected from anything going on in the movie, but I think it's one of the things in the movie... It's real. Here are these two guys who are really kind of victims, talking about the origin and destiny of dinosaurs.

== Soundtrack ==
See Homeboy – Original Score Performed by Eric Clapton.

== In popular culture ==
In Bob Dylan's first memoir, Chronicles Volume One, he writes of a trip to the movies during the recording of the album Oh Mercy. He writes of Mickey Rourke:

He could break your heart with a look. The movie traveled to the moon every time he came onto the screen. Nobody could hold a candle to him. He was just there, didn't have to say hello or goodbye.

Dylan would later work with Rourke on his film Masked and Anonymous in 2001.

== See also ==
- List of boxing films
