= Steppin' Out (Eric Clapton album) =

Compilation album by Eric Clapton
- Released: 1981
- Recorded: May 4, 1964; 1966
- Genre: Blues rock
- Length: 39:24
- Label: Decca
- Producer: Tony Watts (compiler)

Eric Clapton chronology
Another Ticket (1981)	Steppin' Out (1981)	Timepieces: The Best of Eric Clapton (1982)

Steppin' Out is a compilation album of songs featuring Eric Clapton, released in 1981. It was compiled by Decca Records Music Executive Tony Watts with liner notes by Cliff Gater and Fred Dellar. The LP contains eight of the 12 tracks that appeared originally on John Mayall's Blues Breakers with Eric Clapton in 1966, plus a Mayall/Clapton single, "Lonely Years," two tracks ("Third Degree" and "Calcutta Blues") from the 1966 recording session for From New Orleans to Chicago by Champion Jack Dupree on which Clapton played guitar, and "Pretty Girls Everywhere", which is from a May 1964 Otis Spann session (first released the Raw Blues compilation), also featuring Clapton.

The label of the disc incorrectly gives the album title as "Have You Heard".

Professional ratings
Review scores
Source	Rating
Allmusic	link

== Track listing ==
=== Side one ===
1. "Ramblin' On My Mind" (Robert Johnson, arranged by Mayall) - 3:05
2. "Little Girl" (Mayall) - 2:36
3. "All Your Love" (Otis Rush) - 3:34
4. "Key to Love" (Mayall) - 2:09
5. "Double Crossin' Time" (Mayall, Clapton) - 3:02
6. "Have You Heard" (Mayall) - 5:53

=== Side two ===
1. "Hideaway" (Freddie King, Sonny Thompson) - 3:15
2. "Third Degree" (Boyd) - 3:17
3. "Lonely Years" (Mayall) - 3:17
4. "Pretty Girls Everywhere" (Church, Williams) - 2:49
5. "Calcutta Blues" (Dupree) - 4:01
6. "Steppin' Out" (James Bracken) - 2:26
