= August (album) =

Studio album by Eric Clapton
- Released: 24 November 1986
- Recorded: April–May 1986
- Genres: Rock; R&B
- Length: 55:53 (CD); 49:31 (vinyl)
- Label: Duck / Warner Bros.
- Producers: Eric Clapton, Phil Collins, Tom Dowd

Eric Clapton chronology
Edge of Darkness (1985)	August (1986)	The Cream of Eric Clapton (1987)

Singles from August
- 1. "Behind the Mask" Released: 5 January 1987; 2. "It's in the Way That You Use It" Released: 23 March 1987; 3. "Tearing Us Apart" Released: 8 June 1987; 4. "Holy Mother" Released: 23 November 1987

Professional ratings
Review scores
Source	Rating
AllMusic	2/5 stars
Kerrang!	4.5/5 stars
Rolling Stone	unfavorable

August is the tenth solo studio album by the English rock musician Eric Clapton, released in 1986 by Duck Records/Warner Bros. Records. Described as a "hard R&B" album, it was primarily produced by Phil Collins, in association with longtime Clapton associate Tom Dowd.

== Composition ==
The album opens with the Dowd-Clapton produced "It's in the Way That You Use It", co-written with Robbie Robertson, late of The Band. It was featured in the Paul Newman-Tom Cruise film The Color of Money in October 1986, a month before the album's release, subsequently reaching No. 1 on the Mainstream Rock Tracks chart for one week. Two tracks, "Run" and "Hung Up On Your Love", were written by veteran Motown composer Lamont Dozier while "Tearing Us Apart" was a duet with Tina Turner and "Bad Influence" was a cover of a number by blues musician Robert Cray. "Holy Mother", co-written with Stephen Bishop, was dedicated to the memory of another member of The Band, Richard Manuel, who had taken his own life earlier that year.

The album's only UK top 20 hit, "Behind the Mask", was recorded at the suggestion of Greg Phillinganes. Legend has it that upon hearing Yellow Magic Orchestra's original track, around 1980–82, producer Quincy Jones fell in love with the track, and he and Michael Jackson recorded their own version with new lyrics by Jackson during his Thriller sessions. The track never made the Thriller album but Phillinganes, at the time keyboard player for Jackson, released his own version of the song on his 1984 Pulse album, which resembles the Clapton version that became August's lead single in the UK. Jackson's version was finally released in 2010 on the posthumous album Michael.

Clapton's studio band for the album included Collins on drums and backing vocals, bassist Nathan East and keyboard player Greg Phillinganes; saxophonist Michael Brecker, trumpeters Randy Brecker and Jon Faddis, and trombone player Dave Bargeron. Collins, East and Phillinganes would recreate their studio roles for Clapton's acclaimed live appearances over the next two years.

Veering between Collins soul/pop and Clapton blues/rock, August cemented Clapton's comeback.

== Track listing ==
No.	Title	Writer(s)	Length
1.	"It's in the Way That You Use It"	Eric Clapton, Robbie Robertson	4:11
2.	"Run"	Lamont Dozier	3:39
3.	"Tearing Us Apart" (with Tina Turner)	Clapton, Greg Phillinganes	4:15
4.	"Bad Influence"	Robert Cray, Michael Vannice	5:09
5.	"Walk Away"	Richard Feldman, Marcella Detroit	3:52
6.	"Hung Up on Your Love"	Dozier	3:53
7.	"Take a Chance"	Clapton, Nathan East, Phillinganes	4:54
8.	"Hold On"	Clapton, Phil Collins	4:56
9.	"Miss You"	Clapton, Bobby Colomby, Phillinganes	5:06
10.	"Holy Mother"	Stephen Bishop, Clapton	4:55
11.	"Behind the Mask"	Chris Mosdell, Ryuichi Sakamoto, Michael Jackson	4:47
12.	"Grand Illusion" (CD only)	Bob Farrell, Dave Robbins, Charles Robbins, Van Stephenson	6:23

Some tracks were recorded for the album, but not included:

1. "Wanna Make Love to You" (released on the "Behind the Mask" single; later included on Crossroads)
2. "Lady From Verona" (unissued)
3. "Walking the White Line" (unissued)

== Personnel ==
- Eric Clapton – guitars, lead vocals
- Gary Brooker – keyboards (1), backing vocals (1)
- Richard Cottle – synthesizers (1)
- Greg Phillinganes – keyboards (2–12), backing vocals (2–12)
- Richard Feldman – additional keyboards (5)
- Larry Williams – synthesizer programming (where employed) (2–12)
- Laurence Cottle – bass (1)
- Nathan East – bass (2–12)
- Henry Spinetti – drums (1)
- Phil Collins – drums (2–12), percussion (2–12), backing vocals (2–12)
- Michael Brecker – saxophones (2, 4, 6, 7, 9)
- Dave Bargeron – trombone (2, 4, 6, 7, 9)
- Randy Brecker – trumpet (2, 4, 6, 7, 9)
- Jon Faddis – trumpet (2, 4, 6, 7, 9)
- Leon Pendarvis – horn arrangements (2, 4, 6, 7, 9)
- Tina Turner – lead vocals (3), backing vocals (8)
- Katie Kissoon – backing vocals (7, 10, 11)
- Magic Moreno – backing vocals (7)
- Tessa Niles – backing vocals (7, 10, 11)

== Production ==
- Producers – Eric Clapton (Track 1); Tom Dowd (Tracks 1–12); Phil Collins (Tracks 2–12).
- Engineers – Steve Chase and John Jacobs (Track 1); Paul Gommersall, Peter Hefter and Magic Moreno (Tracks 2–12).
- Photography – Terry O'Neill
- Photography Assistant – Tony Burdett
- Artwork – Zarkowski Designs, Ltd.
- Management – Roger Forrester

== Charts ==
=== Weekly charts ===
Chart (1986–1987)	Peak position
Australian Albums (Kent Music Report)	34
Canada Top Albums/CDs (RPM)	40
European Albums (IFPI)	10
Finnish Albums (Suomen virallinen lista)	15
German Albums (Offizielle Top 100)	32
Italian Albums (Musica e Dischi)	19
Japanese Albums (Oricon)	28
New Zealand Albums (RMNZ)	38
Norwegian Albums (VG-lista)	12
Swedish Albums (Sverigetopplistan)	7
Swiss Albums (Schweizer Hitparade)	23
UK Albums (Official Charts)	3
US Billboard 200	37

=== Year-end charts ===
Chart (1987)	Position
US Billboard 200	70

== Certifications ==
Region	Certification	Certified units/sales
United Kingdom (BPI)	Platinum	300,000^{^}
United States (RIAA)	Gold	500,000^{^}
^{^} Shipments figures based on certification alone.

== Singles ==
Year	Single	Chart	Position
1986	"It's in the Way That You Use It"	Mainstream Rock Tracks	1
1986	"Tearing Us Apart"	Mainstream Rock Tracks	5
1987	"Miss You"	Mainstream Rock Tracks	9
1987	"Run"	Mainstream Rock Tracks	21
