= Homeboy – Original Score Performed by Eric Clapton =

Homeboy

Soundtrack album by Eric Clapton
- Released: September 1988
- Genre: Pop rock · Blues
- Length: 53:59
- Label: Virgin
- Producer: Fraser Kennedy

Eric Clapton chronology
Crossroads (1988)	Homeboy (1988)	Journeyman (1989)

Homeboy – Original Score Performed by Eric Clapton is a soundtrack album recorded by the British Rock musician Eric Clapton and features a total of eighteen songs which were mostly composed by Clapton especially for the 1988 American sports drama Homeboy starring Mickey Rourke, Christopher Walken and Debra Feuer. The album was produced and supervised by Fraser Kennedy.

== Artwork and release ==
The album cover shows leading actor in the movie Mickey Rourke in a boxing gym wearing his equipment looking directly into the camera. The background behind and aside the photograph is dark blue and has writing concerning the album title, main actors and performers of the soundtrack on it. The Japanese album cover, features a different photograph on the front cover as well as a second picture, showing Clapton alongside Rourke. The soundtrack was originally released under Virgin Records in September 1988 in North America and for the rest of the world – notably Europe – in November later the same year. In 1988 and 1989, the soundtrack album was released on music cassette, compact disc and grammophone record formats by Virgin Records throughout the world and was in 2004 re-released the first time on compact disc format only. In 2009, the soundtrack album was re-released again by Virgin Records as the release was requested by more and more fans around the world.

== Reception ==
As the release history shows, the album gained the highest sales figures in Canada, Italy, Spain, the United Kingdom, the United States and Japan. Although it is unknown if the soundtrack album did reach any national charts, it had sold more than 100,000 copies in Italy and also gained a Gold record in the United States by the Recording Industry Association of America (RIAA), selling more than 500,000 copies in the country and more than 600,000 worldwide. Music journalists form the film website DVD Legion think the release "definitely stands out" and notes that Clapton played emotional Blues as well as Pop and Rock music or the release. AllMusic critic William Ruhlmann awards the soundtrack three out of five possible stars, giving it an average soundtrack album rating, reviewing:

Eric Clapton's score to the Mickey Rourke film Homeboy consists largely of bluesy instrumental pieces performed by Clapton, keyboard player Michael Kamen, bassist Nathan East, and drummer Steve Ferrone. Clapton's solo electric guitar version of "Dixie" owes much to Jimi Hendrix's version of "The Star-Spangled Banner". There are also a few blues numbers by Magic Sam and J. B. Hutto. The playing is accomplished, of course, but like most soundtracks this one seems to be missing something without the film images.

— William Ruhlmann, AllMusic

== Track listing ==
Homeboy track listing
No.	Title	Writer(s)	Length
1.	"Travelling East"	Eric Clapton · Michael Kamen	2:52
2.	"Johnny"	Eric Clapton	1:29
3.	"Call Me If You Need Me" (by Magic Sam)	Magic Sam	3:03
4.	"Bridge"	Eric Clapton	2:25
5.	"Pretty Baby" (by J.B. Hutto & the Hawks)	Junior Parker	4:35
6.	"Dixie"	Traditional	3:42
7.	"Ruby's Loft"	Eric Clapton	2:33
8.	"Country Bikin"	Eric Clapton	1:47
9.	"I Want to Love You Baby" (by Jo Jo Benson · Peggy Scott)	Don Hill	2:36
10.	"Bike Ride"	Eric Clapton	1:37
11.	"Ruby"	Eric Clapton	3:54
12.	"Party"	Eric Clapton	1:44
13.	"Living in the Real World" (by Brakes)	Rod Argent	3:36
14.	"Training"	Eric Clapton	4:00
15.	"Final Fight"	Eric Clapton	3:43
16.	"Chase"	Eric Clapton	3:33
17.	"Dixie"	Traditional	2:35
18.	"Homeboy"	Eric Clapton · Michael Kamen	4:15
Total length:			53:59

== Certifications ==
Region	Certification	Certified units/sales
Italy sales 1988-1989	—	100,000
United States (RIAA)	Gold	500,000^{^}
^{^} Shipments figures based on certification alone.
