= To Save a Child: An Intimate Live Concert =

Live album by Eric Clapton
- Released: 26 April 2024
- Recorded: 8 December 2023
- Venue: RD, London, England, UK
- Genre: Rock
- Length: 67:05
- Label: Surfdog; Bushbranch
- Producer: Eric Clapton; Simon Climie

Eric Clapton chronology
Nothing but the Blues (2022)	To Save a Child: An Intimate Live Concert (2024)	Meanwhile (2024)

To Save a Child: An Intimate Live Concert is a live album by British rock musician Eric Clapton, released on 26 April 2024. The album features a concert by Clapton that was recorded in London in front of a small audience on 8 December 2023, which featured a guest appearance by Dhani Harrison on the song "Give Me Love (Give Me Peace on Earth)", a cover of George Harrison's 1973 song. Proceeds from the sales of To Save a Child: An Intimate Live Concert were donated to aid children in Gaza in response to the Israeli invasion of the Gaza Strip.

== Track listing ==
To Save a Child: An Intimate Live Concert track listing
No.	Title	Length
1.	"Voice of a Child"	3:31
2.	"Tears in Heaven"	4:31
3.	"Layla"	6:00
4.	"Nobody Knows You When You're Down and Out"	3:23
5.	"Key to the Highway"	5:22
6.	"Hoochie Coochie Man"	5:00
7.	"River of Tears"	7:07
8.	"Got to Get Better in a Little While"	9:28
9.	"The Sky Is Crying"	7:45
10.	"Crossroads"	6:58
11.	"Give Me Love (Give Me Peace on Earth)" (with Dhani Harrison)	4:03
12.	"Prayer of a Child"	3:57
Total length:		67:05

== Charts ==
Chart performance for To Save a Child: An Intimate Live Concert
Chart (2024)	Peak position
Austrian Albums (Ö3 Austria)	13
Belgian Albums (Ultratop Wallonia)	133
German Albums (Offizielle Top 100)	24
Scottish Albums (OCC)	17
