= Timepieces: The Best of Eric Clapton =

Greatest hits album by Eric Clapton
- Released: April 1982
- Recorded: 1970–1978
- Genre: Rock
- Length: 44:52
- Label: RSO
- Producer: Tom Dowd, Delaney Bramlett, Glyn Johns, the Dominos

Eric Clapton chronology
Steppin' Out (1981)	Timepieces: The Best of Eric Clapton (1982)	Timepieces Vol.II Live in the Seventies (1983)

Timepieces: The Best of Eric Clapton is a greatest hits album by British musician Eric Clapton. The album was originally released by RSO/Polydor Records in April 1982 (see 1982 in music). The following year a second volume, Time Pieces Vol.II Live in the Seventies, was released by the label. The album has been reissued several times and has been awarded certifications in several regions. Billboard reported the album sold more than 13,400,000 copies worldwide.

== Background and compilation ==
In 1982, Eric Clapton left RSO and Polydor to form his own label, Duck Records, with distribution through Warner Bros. With the loss of the artist, the two Time Pieces albums were compiled and released.

The songs on the album were all released as singles, with only one song—"Knockin' on Heaven's Door"—having never been released on an RSO album. A large number of songs on the release were either from 461 Ocean Boulevard or Slowhand, while none of the songs were released on No Reason to Cry or Another Ticket. The original vinyl and cassette releases contained the live version of "Cocaine" from the 1980 release "Just One Night"; the later CD issue deleted this for the studio version from "Slowhand", and also included the song "Let It Grow" from "461 Ocean Boulevard".

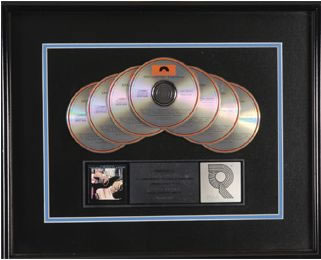
A 7-times Platinum RIAA certification for the album.

== Track listing ==
1. "I Shot the Sheriff" (Bob Marley) – 4:23
  - From the album 461 Ocean Boulevard (1974)
2. "After Midnight" (J. J. Cale) – 3:08
  - From the album Eric Clapton (1970)
3. "Knockin' on Heaven's Door" (Bob Dylan) – 4:21
  - Non-album single (1975)
4. "Wonderful Tonight" (Eric Clapton) – 3:39
  - From the album Slowhand (1977)
5. "Layla" by Derek and the Dominos (Clapton, Jim Gordon) – 7:06
  - From the album Layla and Other Assorted Love Songs (1970)
6. "Cocaine" (Cale) – 3:34
  - From the album Slowhand (1977) *The 1982 US LP uses the live version from Just One Night*
7. "Lay Down Sally" (Clapton, Marcy Levy, George Terry) – 3:49
  - From the album Slowhand (1977)
8. "Willie and the Hand Jive" (Johnny Otis) – 3:28
  - From the album 461 Ocean Boulevard (1974)
9. "Promises" (Richard Feldman, Roger Linn) – 3:00
  - From the album Backless (1978)
10. "Swing Low, Sweet Chariot" (Traditional, arr. Clapton) – 3:29
  - From the album There's One in Every Crowd (1975)
11. "Let It Grow" (Clapton) – 4:55 *On UK version and CD reissue*
  - From the album 461 Ocean Boulevard (1974)

== Charts ==
=== Weekly charts ===
Charts for Timepieces: The Best of Eric Clapton
Chart (1982–2004)	Peak position
Australian Albums (Kent Music Report)	28
Dutch Albums (Album Top 100)	65
Dutch Albums (Midprice Albums Top 50)	42
Japanese Albums (Oricon)	34
New Zealand Albums (RMNZ)	22
Spanish Albums (AFYVE)	13
UK Albums (OCC)	20
US Billboard 200	101
US Top Catalog Albums (Billboard)	1

== Certifications ==
Region	Certification	Certified units/sales
Argentina (CAPIF)	Gold	30,000^{^}
Austria (IFPI Austria) 1994 certification	Platinum	50,000^{*}
Austria (IFPI Austria) 1996 certification	Platinum	50,000^{*}
Hong Kong (IFPI Hong Kong)	Gold	10,000^{*}
Japan (RIAJ)	Million	1,000,000^{^}
Netherlands (NVPI)	Platinum	100,000^{^}
New Zealand (RMNZ)	Platinum	15,000^{^}
Spain (Promusicae)	Gold	50,000^{^}
Switzerland (IFPI Switzerland)	Gold	25,000^{^}
United Kingdom (BPI)	Gold	100,000^{^}
United States (RIAA)	7× Platinum	7,000,000^{^}
^{*} Sales figures based on certification alone.^{^} Shipments figures based on certification alone.

== Release history ==
Region	Date	Label	Format	Catalog
Europe	April 1982	RSO Records	LP	RSD 5010
North America	April 1982	RSO Records	LP	RS-1-3099
Worldwide	November 1982	Polydor Records	CD	810,014-2
