= The Cream of Eric Clapton (film) =

- The Cream of Eric Clapton
- Produced by: Chris Hunt
- Starring: Eric Clapton; Jack Bruce; Ginger Baker; Phil Collins
- Release dates: January 23, 1990 (VHS); April 29, 1998 (DVD)
- Running time: 78 minutes
- Language: English

The Cream of Eric Clapton is a compilation DVD of live Eric Clapton performances. It is not to be confused with the CD The Cream of Eric Clapton.

== Personnel ==
- Eric Clapton as himself
- Jack Bruce as himself (archive footage)
- Ginger Baker as himself (archive footage)
- Tina Turner as herself
- Phil Collins as himself

== Track listing ==
=== The Yardbirds ===
1 "Louise" (Hooker)

=== Cream ===
2 "Cross Roads" [sic] (Johnson, arr. Clapton)
3 "I Feel Free" (Bruce/Brown)
4 "Sunshine of Your Love" (Bruce/Brown/Clapton)
5 "Strange Brew" (Clapton/Pappalardi/Collins)
6 "White Room"^{1} (Bruce/Brown)

=== Solo ===
7 "Badge"^{2} (Clapton/Harrison)
8 "Worried Life Blues" (Merriweather)
9 "Layla"^{3} (Clapton/Gordon)
10 "Knockin' On Heaven's Door" (Dylan)
11 "Cocaine" (Cale)
12 "I Shot the Sheriff" (Marley)
13 "Wonderful Tonight"^{5} (Clapton)
14 "Forever Man" (Williams)
15 "Tearing Us Apart" ^{4} (Clapton/Phillinganes)
16 "Behind the Mask" (Mosdell/Sakamoto/Jackson)
17 "Holy Mother" (Clapton/Bishop)

== Track listing notes ==
^1 edited from both the Cream farewell concert and their Rock and Roll Hall of Fame induction.
^2 was not performed with Cream.
^3 edited from three different performances.
^4 performed as a duet with Tina Turner.
^5 performed with Mark Knopfler

== Certifications ==
Region	Certification	Certified units/sales
Japan	—	10,000
United States (RIAA)	Platinum	100,000^{^}
^{^} Shipments figures based on certification alone.
