= Debra Feuer =

American former actress

Debra Lee Feuer is an American former actress. She starred in the films Moment by Moment, The Hollywood Knights, To Live and Die in L.A., MacGruder and Loud, Il burbero and Homeboy: the latter in which she starred with her then-husband Mickey Rourke.

In November 1978, Feuer portrayed Daisy Mae in an NBC-TV special, Li'l Abner in Dogpatch Today. She also played a minor role as Becky Mae in the TV series The Dukes of Hazzard, in the Season 2, Episode 6, "The Ghost of General Lee". She also played Sonny Crockett's love interest in the first two episodes of Season 5 of Miami Vice.

== Filmography ==
- Beyond Reason directed by Telly Savalas (1977)
- Starsky & Hutch directed by George McCowan (2 episodes) (1977)
- Fantasy Island directed by Allen Baron and George McCowan (1 episode) (1978)
- The Love Boat Musical Cabins directed by Allen Baron (1 episode) (1978)
- Lacy and the Mississippi Queen directed by Robert Butler (1978)
- Moment by Moment directed by Jane Wagner (1978)
- Flying High directed by Dennis Donnelly (1978)
- The Dukes of Hazzard directed by Jack Starrett (1 episode) (1979)
- Vega$ directed by Don Chaffey (1 episode) (1980)
- The Hollywood Knights directed by Floyd Mutrux (1980)
- Red Flag: The Ultimate Game directed by Don Taylor (1981)
- Hardcase directed by Lee Katzin (1981)
- MacGruder and Loud directed by Jerry London (1 episode) (1985)
- To Live and Die in L.A. directed by William Friedkin (1985)
- Il Burbero directed by Castellano & Pipolo (1986)
- Crime Story directed by James Contner (1 episode) (1987)
- Homeboy directed by Michael Seresin (1988)
- Miami Vice directed by Don Johnson and Paul Krasny (2 episodes) (1988)
- Desperado: The Outlaw Wars directed by Egbert Swackhamer (1989)
- Night Angel directed by Dominique Othenin-Girard (1990)
- Under Cover of Darkness directed by Walter Pitt (1992)
- Frank's Angel directed by Suse Uhlenbrock (1995)
- No Pussyfooting directed by Yael Russcol (2000)
