= Mojo Books =

A Mojo Books is a company that produced books, in e-book PDF format, based on the output of a given band, singer or composer. Its creators were the Brazilian editors Danilo Corci and Ricardo Giassetti, with the aid of the cover artist Delfin.

During the mid-1990s, Corci and Giassetti formed a synth-pop band called Toward the Cathedral along with composer Will Geraldo. The lyrics for the band's songs were usually based on such writers as James Joyce, Ernest Hemingway, Franz Kafka, Edgar Allan Poe and Marcel Proust. Ten years later they decided to turn music into literature and by the end of 2006 Corci and Giassetti had established the Mojo Books project to produce e-books based on records. Writers have ranged from amateurs to professional writers and academics.

== Available e-books ==
1. Black Celebration - Depeche Mode by Danilo Corci
2. Technique - New Order, by Ricardo Giassetti
3. #1 Record - Big Star, by Luiz Cesar Pimentel
4. In it for the Money - Supergrass, by Delfin
5. Revolver - The Beatles, by Jota Wagner
6. Dummy - Portishead, by Ludmila Azevedo
7. Doolittle - The Pixies, by Marcelo Costa
8. Comes a Time - Neil Young, by CEL
9. Thriller - Michael Jackson, by Rodrigo James
10. The Life Pursuit - Belle & Sebastian, by Paulo F.
11. Dressed up like Nebraska - Josh Rouse, by Mariana Tramontina
12. Racional - Tim Maia, by Mariel Reis
13. Transformer - Lou Reed, by Mariangela Carvalho
14. Volume 1 - Bauhaus, by Heitor Werneck
15. Pet Sounds - Beach Boys, by Helio Flanders
16. American IV - Johnny Cash, by Pablo Melgar
17. Endtroducing - DJ Shadow, by Filipe Luna
18. World Clique - Deee-Lite, by Guilherme Choovanski
19. Cartola 74 - Caetola, by Igor Capelatto
20. Ziggy Stardust - David Bowie, by Maria Lutterbach
21. Samba Esquema Noise - Mondo Livre S/A, by André Gamma
22. Tabula Rasa - Einstürzende Neubauten, by J. Bernucci
23. Like a Prayer - Madonna, by Alex Oliveira
