= Time Pieces Vol.II Live in the Seventies =

Timepieces Vol. II Live in the Seventies

Live album by Eric Clapton
- Released: 1983
- Recorded: 1970–79
- Genre: Blues rock
- Length: 46:16
- Label: Polydor
- Producer: Jon Astley

Eric Clapton chronology
Timepieces: The Best of Eric Clapton (1982)	Timepieces Vol. II Live in the Seventies (1983)	Money and Cigarettes (1983)

Professional ratings
Review scores
Source	Rating
Allmusic	link

Timepieces Vol. II Live in the Seventies is a live album released in 1983 by Eric Clapton.

== Track listing ==
1. "Tulsa Time" (Danny Flowers) – 4:02
2. "Knockin' on Heaven's Door" (Bob Dylan) 06:27 - Previously unreleased
3. "If I Don't Be There by Morning" (Bob Dylan, Helena Springs) 04:12
4. "Ramblin' on My Mind"/"Have You Ever Loved A Woman" (Robert Johnson/Traditional/Billy Myles) – 8:48
5. "Presence of the Lord" (Clapton) – with Derek and the Dominos 06:05
6. "Can't Find My Way Home" (Steve Winwood)* - 05:21
7. "Smile" (Chaplin, Parsons, Phillips)* - 3:41
8. "Blues Power" (Clapton, Leon Russell) - 7:34

Produced by Jon Astley (except (*) produced by Tom Dowd)

1–4 and 8 – Recorded live December 1979 at the Budokan Theatre, Tokyo and, except for 2, previously released on Just One Night.
5 – Recorded live at the Fillmore East 1970 with Derek and the Dominos. Previously released on In Concert.
6 and 7 – Recorded live 20 July 1974 at the Long Beach Arena, Long Beach, California. Track 6 previously released on E.C. Was Here, Track 7 Previously released on the 10" RSO sampler album Prime Cuts in May 1975.

== Credits ==
- Jon Astley – Engineer, Mixing, Producer
- Philip Chapman – Mixing
- Tom Dowd – Producer, Remastering
- Richard Manwaring – Remastering
- Andy Knight – Remastering
- Eddie Kramer – Engineer

== Band members ==
- Eric Clapton – Arranger, Guitar, Vocals
- Yvonne Elliman – Vocals
- Jim Gordon – Drums
- Albert Lee – Guitar, Keyboards, Vocals
- Marcy Levy – Tambourine
- Dave Markee – Bass
- Jamie Oldaker – Drums
- Carl Radle – Bass
- Dick Sims – Organ
- Henry Spinetti – Drums
- Chris Stainton – Keyboards
- George Terry – Guitar
- Bobby Whitlock – Organ, Vocals
