= Stages (Eric Clapton album) =

Compilation album by Eric Clapton
- Released: May 27, 1993
- Recorded: 1965–1977
- Genre: Blues rock
- Length: 63:19
- Label: Karussell Records; Spectrum Records

Professional ratings
Review scores
Source	Rating
AllMusic	2.5/5 stars

Stages is a compilation album by Eric Clapton, which was released in May 1993. It contains a collection of tracks from various stages of Clapton's long career up to that point in time.

== Track listing ==
1. "Steppin' Out"
2. "Ramblin' On My Mind"
3. "Hideaway"
4. "Have You Heard"
5. "Out Side Woman Blues"
6. "Crossroads" (Live)
7. "They Call It Stormy Monday (Live)"
8. "Well Alright"
9. "Bell Bottom Blues"
10. "Blues Power" (Live)
11. "Drifting Blues" (Live)
12. "Mean Old Frisco"

== Credits ==
- Ginger Baker – Drums
- Blind Faith – Performer
- Jack Bruce – Musician
- Eric Clapton – Arranger, Guitar, Musician, Vocals
- Derek & the Dominos – Performer
- Hughie Flint – Musician
- Jim Gordon – Musician
- Ric Grech – Musician
- John Mayall – Arranger, Musician, Guitar
- John Mayall & the Bluesbreakers – Performer
- Carl Radle – Musician
- Bobby Whitlock – Musician
- Steve Winwood – Guitar
