= Planes, Trains and Eric =

- Directed by: David Maxwell
- Music by: Eric Clapton
- Distributed by: Eagle Vision
- Release date: 4 November 2014
- Running time: 156 minutes
- Country: United Kingdom
- Language: English

Planes, Trains and Eric is a documentary film about Eric Clapton's Mid and Far East Tour, which the British rock musician held in 2014. The recording provides a mixture of interviews, backstage footage and live concert performances by Clapton and his band as they travel through Japan, Singapore, Bahrain and the United Arab Emirates. A second, alternative release title goes by the name of Planes, Trains and Eric: The Music, The Stories, The People – Mid and Far East Tour 2014. It was released on DVD and Blu-ray disc on November 4, 2014.

== Background ==
When Clapton announced in early 2014, that he had enough of the touring business and travel when turning 70, speculation from the news of the world started to ask Clapton for reasons and an answer. In the movie, Clapton says that the release of Planes, Trains and Eric honors Japan and his love affair with the Mid and Far East, if he should retire from touring. He also talked with his long-time Japanese friend of Udo Artist: "Stop playing in Japan will be tough for me, because I like coming here very much. But I would like to stop one day".

== Content ==
The film starts out with an interview with Clapton. After the conversation, "Tell the Truth" is being played by Clapton and his band that consists of Steve Gadd on drums, Nathan East on bass guitar and background vocals, Chris Stainton as the keyboardist, Paul Carrack as a background singer and Hammond organ player as well as Sharon White and Michelle John on backing vocals. As the film moves forward, interview sequences and live performances of Clapton and his band change in regular bases. Only a couple of times, backstage footage and soundchecks follow the live concert action. While playing in Japan, Clapton received a special recognition award from Udo Artists, commemorating Clapton's 200th show in Japan as well as a total of 83 performances at the Nippon Budokan. With 207 live performances in Japan, before leaving to Singapore in early 2014, Clapton is the international record holder with the most concerts played in Japan. If Clapton retires from the touring industry after his 70th birthday, that would come up, remains a mystery, although Clapton and the band talk frequently about the possibility.

== Performance listing ==
DVD track listing
| No. | Title | Writer(s) | Length |
|---|---|---|---|
| 1. | "Tell the Truth" | Eric Clapton · Bobby Whitlock |
| 2. | "Pretending" | Jerry Lynn Williams |
| 3. | "Crossroads" | Robert Johnson |
| 4. | "Driftin'" | Charles Brown · Johnny Moore · Eddie Williams |
| 5. | "I Shot the Sheriff" | Bob Marley |
| 6. | "Little Queen of Spades" | Robert Johnson |
| 7. | "Layla" | Eric Clapton · Jim Gordon |
| 8. | "Wonderful Tonight" | Eric Clapton |
| 9. | "Key to the Highway" | William Broonzy · Charles Segar |
| 10. | "Before You Accuse Me" | Bo Diddley |
| 11. | "Tears in Heaven" | Eric Clapton · Will Jennings |
| 12. | "Cocaine" | JJ Cale |
| 13. | "Hoochie Coochie Man" | Willie Dixon |
| 14. | "High Time We Went" | Joe Cocker · Chris Stainton |

DVD Bonus tracks
| No. | Title | Writer(s) | Length |
|---|---|---|---|
| 15. | "Nobody Knows You When You're Down and Out" | Jimmy Cox |
| 16. | "Alabama Woman Blues" | Mayo Williams · Leroy Carr |

== Critical reception ==
Professional ratings
Review scores
| Source | Rating |
|---|---|
| Jpc | 4.5/5 stars |
| Sächsische Zeitung | 5/5 stars |
| Frankfurter Allgemeine Zeitung | 5/5 stars |

The German online music retailer Jpc awarded the DVD release 4.5 out of possible five stars, which is rare for any music DVD to get a 4.5 rating from the store. The music critic Andreas Schiffmann from the German internet music rating platform Musikreviews.de calls the release a "three quarter highlight concerts with an amazing documentary in between about Eric Clapton in his golden age". Michael Donhauser, a journalist for the German newspaper Sächsische Zeitung notes, that this music documentary is "exceptionally formative" and goes on in his review, liking the "whole atmosphere" that is presented with this DVD. The review from the Frankfurter Allgemeine Zeitung, written by Andreas Platthaus, says that the concert film pictures a "happy and motivated Eric Clapton". Platthaus went on with his positive-only review for the German newspaper. AllMusic user reviews turned out to be positive as well. No critic reviewed the video yet.

== Chart positions ==
=== Weekly charts ===
| Chart (2014–2015) | Peak position |
|---|---|
| Australian DVD Albums (ARIA) | 4 |
| Austrian Music DVD (Ö3 Austria) | 4 |
| Belgian Music DVD (Ultratop Flanders) | 8 |
| Belgian Music DVD (Ultratop Wallonia) | 9 |
| Dutch Music DVD (MegaCharts) | 3 |
| French Music DVD (SNEP) | 5 |
| German Albums (Offizielle Top 100) | 65 |
| Italian Music DVD (FIMI) | 7 |
| Japanese Music Blu-ray (Oricon) | 18 |
| Japanese Music DVD (Oricon) | 18 |
| Swedish Music DVD (Sverigetopplistan) | 1 |
| Swiss Music DVD (Schweizer Hitparade) | 4 |
| UK Music Videos (Official Charts) | 3 |
| US Music Video Sales (Billboard) | 1 |

=== Year-end charts ===
| Chart (2014) | Position |
|---|---|
| Australian DVD Albums (ARIA) | 43 |
| Dutch Music DVD (MegaCharts) | 43 |

| Preceded by Country Classics: A Tapestry Of Our Musical Heritage by Joey + Rory | Billboard Music Video number-one DVD; November 22, 2015 – November 28, 2015 | Succeeded by From The Vault: Hampton Coliseum (Live in 1981) by The Rolling Stones |
| Preceded by The Legend of Johnny Thunders by Looking for Johnny | Swedish Music number-one DVD; November 6, 2015 – November 12, 2015 | Succeeded by From The Vault: Hampton Coliseum (Live in 1981) by The Rolling Stones |
