= Live at Montreux 1986 (Eric Clapton film) =

- Directed by: Thierry Amsallem
- Starring: Eric Clapton
- Distributed by: Eagle
- Release date: 16 September 2006
- Running time: 114 minutes
- Country: United Kingdom
- Language: English

Live at Montreux 1986 is a concert film featuring the British blues rock guitarist and singer Eric Clapton. The video release consists of live footage that was recorded while Eric Clapton and his band played for over one and a half hours at the 1986 Montreux Jazz Festival. The set list includes Clapton's signature songs such as "I Shot the Sheriff," "Cocaine," "Layla" and "Let It Rain" as well as his Cream-era hits "Crossroads," "White Room," "Badge" and "Sunshine of Your Love." Drummer Phil Collins also sang his 1981 hit "In the Air Tonight." The video taping was released on 19 September 2006 on DVD format. A Blu-ray disc was also released in 2014. The release was mildly successful and it gained critical praise and various music recording certification awards around the world.

== Background ==
The concert film features Eric Clapton and his friends as the house band, playing a set list of one hour and fifty minutes at the 1986 Montreux Jazz Festival, which was held at the Montreux Casino on 10 July 1986. The DVD video was released on 19 September 2006, whereas the Blu-ray disc was released eight years later. Eric Clapton's friends who formed the band consist of Nathan East on bass guitar, Phil Collins on drums, and Greg Phillinganes on the keyboard.

== Track listing ==
DVD track listing
No.	Title	Writer(s)	Length
1.	"Crossroads"	Robert Johnson	5:12
2.	"White Room"	Pete Brown · Jack Bruce	5:39
3.	"I Shot the Sheriff"	Bob Marley	6:28
4.	"I Wanna Make Love to You"	Jerry Lynn Williams	5:54
5.	"Miss You"	Eric Clapton · Greg Phillinganes · Bobby Colomby	4:58
6.	"Same Old Blues"	Eric Clapton	13:11
7.	"Tearing Us Apart"	Eric Clapton · Greg Phillinganes	6:05
8.	"Holy Mother"	Eric Clapton · Stephen Bishop	5:00
9.	"Behind the Mask"	Chris J. Mosdell · Ryuichi Sakamoto	5:00
10.	"Badge"	Eric Clapton · George Harrison	3:54
11.	"Let It Rain"	Eric Clapton · Bonnie Bramlett	6:59
12.	"In the Air Tonight"	Phil Collins	5:13
13.	"Cocaine"	JJ Cale	5:40
14.	"Layla"	Eric Clapton · Jim Gordon	4:09
15.	"Sunshine of Your Love"	Eric Clapton · Jack Bruce · Pete Brown	2:58
16.	"Further on Up the Road"	Joe Medwick · Don Robey	5:05

The video is nearly the complete concert. The only missing songs are: Run (performed after I Wanna Make Love To You), Have You Ever Loved a Woman and Ramblin' on My Mind (the second encore).

== Critical reception ==
Music critic Linus Schwanke calls the release "in every way a highlight." He goes positively on in his review, noting Live at Montreux 1986 is a "huge enjoyment for ears and eyes" and "this is how perfect blues-rock should be written, recorded and played." Olaf Oetken of Rocktimes online magazine notes the release features "important music of one of the world's most important and best guitar players." Oetken also calls the video release "one of Eric Clapton's best concerts". Allmusic did not rate the release yet.

== Personnel ==
=== Main personnel ===
- Eric Clapton – Guitar · lead vocals
- Nathan East – Bass guitar · backing vocals
- Phil Collins – Drums · backing vocals
- Greg Phillinganes – Keyboards · backing vocals

=== Production crew ===
- Thierry Amsallem – Director
- Andree Buchler – Post production
- Eric Glardon – Post producer
- Keith Haring – Poster designer
- Michael Heatley – Liner Notes writer
- Claire Higgins – Production coordination
- Rosie Holley – Associate producer
- Geoff Kempin – Executive producer
- Claude Nobs – Executive producer
- Jean Ristori – Post producer · post production
- Melissa Roy – Associate producer
- Terry Shand – Executive producer
- Abbi Welch – Production coordination

== Chart performance ==
Live at Montreux 1986 peaked at number two on the Portuguese Top 30 music DVD chart in late 2006. In Austria, the DVD release, reached his second best charting position, respectively peaking at number eight on the Ö3 Austria Top 10 music DVD chart in October 2006, where it stayed one week on chart. In the United Kingdom, the release positioned itself at rank 23 on the music DVD chart, compiled by the Official Charts Company. In the Netherlands, Live at Montreux 1986 reached number 26 on the MegaCharts compilation. In Germany, the DVD charted on the official Media Control albums chart at number 99. The release reached the year-end charts in Portugal on number 31, making it Eric Clapton's only DVD to reach the country's year-end chart. In Canada, New Zealand and the United States, the release was awarded a gold disc for outstanding sales. In Australia, the DVD was certified platinum to commemorate the nationwide sales. In total, the release sold more than 72,500 copies worldwide.

== Chart positions ==
=== Weekly charts ===
Chart (2006–07)	Peak position
Australian Music DVD (ARIA)	2
Austrian Music DVD (Ö3 Austria)	8
Dutch Music DVD (MegaCharts)	26
German Albums (Offizielle Top 100)	99
Portuguese Music DVD (AFP)	2
UK Music Video DVD (OCC)	23

=== Year-end charts ===
Chart (2006)	Position
Portuguese Music DVD (AFP)	31

== Certifications ==
Region	Certification	Certified units/sales
Australia (ARIA)	Platinum	15,000^{^}
Canada (Music Canada)	Gold	5,000^{^}
New Zealand (RMNZ)	Gold	2,500^{^}
United States (RIAA)	Gold	50,000^{^}
^{^} Shipments figures based on certification alone.
