= Edge of Darkness (1985 soundtrack) =

Soundtrack album by Eric Clapton
- Released: November 1985
- Recorded: Great Britain
- Genre: Soundtrack, instrumental rock, hard rock
- Length: 18:44
- Label: BBC Records & Tapes

Eric Clapton chronology
Behind the Sun (1985)	Edge of Darkness (1985)	August (1986)

Edge of Darkness is the 1985 soundtrack by Eric Clapton and Michael Kamen for the British television series Edge of Darkness. The soundtrack's theme won the Ivor Novello Award for songwriting and composing, besides winning the 1986 BAFTA Award for Best Music.

== Background and performance ==
For Clapton, it was his second experience writing for film (his first was the title music for the movie 'The Hit', recorded the previous year); shortly after attending Terry Gilliam's movie Brazil with his friend Kamen, who had scored the film, he received a call from the BBC asking him to do the music for Edge of Darkness, and he subsequently asked Kamen for assistance.

In the early 1990s Clapton performed the music live, with the National Philharmonic Orchestra under the direction of Michael Kamen; the title song from one of those performances is captured on 24 Nights.

== Reception ==
The soundtrack attracted few reviews. The Age mentioned the music in a review of the series, saying that Clapton's music matched the mysterious and shadowy feel of the drama; The Atlanta Journal-Constitution, again in a review of the TV series, said the accompanying music was "particularly noteworthy."

The single reached No. 65 on the British charts, on which it spent three weeks in January 1986.

== Track listing ==
Side one
No.	Title	Length
1.	"Edge Of Darkness"	3:19
2.	"Shoot Out"	3:48
3.	"Obituary"	2:09

Side two
No.	Title	Length
4.	"Escape From Northmoor"	3:09
5.	"Oxford Circus"	3:17
6.	"Northmoor"	3:02

== Releases ==
Originally sold as a 45 rpm 12" record and as a cassette, it was re-released in February 1989 as a 3" CD single (with a cover changed from the record's mainly black and red cover). A live version on the main theme was issued on a single together with a live version of "Wonderful Tonight" in 1991, and on the 1991 live album 24 Nights.
