= Lethal Weapon (soundtrack) =

Lethal Weapon: Original Motion Picture Soundtrack

Soundtrack album by Michael Kamen, Eric Clapton and David Sanborn
- Released: March 30, 1987
- Genres: Orchestral; jazz; blues
- Length: 40:00 (Original Release); 65:37 (2002); 118:37 (2013)
- Labels: Warner Bros. (1987); Bacchus Media (2002); La La Land (2013)

Professional ratings
Review scores
Source	Rating
AllMusic	3.5/5 stars

Lethal Weapon: Original Motion Picture Soundtrack is a soundtrack album of the 1987 film Lethal Weapon. It is composed by Michael Kamen and Eric Clapton and performed by Kamen, Clapton and David Sanborn, with the title track performed by Honeymoon Suite, and was originally released on audio cassette and CD on March 30, 1987. The score features a blend of orchestral music, jazz and smooth rock.

== Track listing ==
1. "Amanda"
2. "Meet Martin Riggs"
3. "Roger"
4. "Coke Deal"
5. "Mr. Joshua"
6. "They've Got my Daughter"
7. "The Desert"
8. "Nightclub"
9. "The Weapon"
10. "Theme From Lethal Weapon"

== 2002 Limited Edition ==
In April 2002 a Limited Edition Score of 3,000 numbered copies was released. This release featured several unreleased tracks, including the cue from the famous "Hollywood Blvd. Chase" sequence (a recurring cue in both Lethal Weapon 2 and 3).

1. "Meet Martin Riggs"
2. "Amanda"
3. "Suicide Attempt"
4. "The Jumper/Rog & Riggs Confrontation"
5. "Roger"
6. "Coke Deal"
7. "Mr. Joshua"
8. "They Got My Daughter"
9. "The Desert"
10. "We're Getting Too Old For This"
11. "Hollywood Blvd Chase"
12. "The General's Car"
13. "SOB Knows Where I Live" (Orchestral Version)
14. "Yard Fight/Graveside"
15. "The Weapon"
16. "Nightclub"
17. "Lethal Weapon" - by Honeymoon Suite

== 2013 Limited Edition ==
In December 2013 La-La Land Records released the complete score as part of Lethal Weapon Soundtrack Collection. Tracks in bold are previously unreleased, tracks in italics contain previously unreleased material.

Disc One

1. Jingle Bell Rock - Bobby Helms (2:03)
2. Amanda (3:44)
3. Meeting Martin Riggs/Roger's Daughter (1:20)
4. She Just Dove (1:03)
5. Coke Deal (1:59)
6. Suicide (2:26)
7. **Meet Your New Partner** (2:35)
8. Burning Joshua (:51)
9. The Jumper (4:51)
10. Rog and Riggs Confront (1:33)
11. Drive to Dealer's House (2:43)
12. Dealer's House/Swimming Pool (3:03)
13. **Took a Lot of Guts**/Riggs’ Soliloquy (1:36)
14. Porno Tape (1:20)
15. **Firing Range** (1:33)
16. **Dixie's House**/**Alfred** (2:10)
17. **The Hunsacker Story** (3:03)
18. **Helicopter**/**Riggs Walks to Tart** (1:47)
19. Riggs Gets Shot (1:00)
20. They've Got My Daughter/**Is Riggs Dead? Or What?** (2:31)
21. The Desert (8:56)
22. **Hummingbird Treatment**/Riggs Escapes (4:49)
23. We’re Leaving (4:11)
24. General's Car (1:42)
25. S.O.B. Knows Where I Live (1:17)
26. Yard Fight/Graveside (5:57)

Disc Two Original Soundtrack Album (Tracks 1–10) plus Additional Tracks

1. Lethal Weapon - Honeymoon Suite (2:41)
2. Amanda (3:07)
3. Meet Martin Riggs (5:22)
4. Roger (4:01)
5. Coke Deal (4:16)
6. Mr. Joshua (4:06)
7. They've Got My Daughter (1:03)
8. The Desert (7:44)
9. Nightclub (3:39)
10. The Weapon (4:25)
11. Suicide (original) (1:38)
12. **Suicide (alternate)** (2:34)
13. **Helicopter (alternate mix)** (1:39)
14. S.O.B. Knows Where I Live (orchestra only) (1:17)
