= Crossroads Guitar Festival 2019 =

Live album by Eric Clapton, Various Artists
- Released: November 20, 2020
- Recorded: September 20 & 21, 2019
- Venue: American Airlines Center
- Label: Warner Music, Rhino Records

Eric Clapton, Various Artists chronology
Happy Xmas (2018)	Crossroads Guitar Festival 2019 (2020)	The Lady in the Balcony: Lockdown Sessions (2021)

The live and video album Crossroads Guitar Festival 2019 is the sixth release in the series of Eric Clapton's Crossroads Guitar Festivals to support his rehabilitation centre in Antigua, the Crossroads Centre, documenting the 2019 performances from two concerts held on September 20 and September 21, 2019 at the American Airlines Center in Dallas, Texas. The album was released on November 20, 2020 through Warner and Rhino Records.

== Track listing CD ==
=== Disc 1 ===
1. "Native Stepson" – Sonny Landreth
2. "Wonderful Tonight" – Eric Clapton, Andy Fairweather Low
3. "Lay Down Sally" – Eric Clapton, Andy Fairweather Low
4. "Million Miles" – Bonnie Raitt, Keb’ Mo’, Alan Darby
5. "Son's Gonna Rise" – Citizen Cope, Gary Clark Jr.
6. "Lait / De Ushuaia A La Quiaca" – Gustavo Santaolalla
7. "I Wanna Be Your Dog" – Doyle Bramhall II, Susan Tedeschi, Derek Trucks
8. "That's How Strong My Love Is" – Doyle Bramhall II, Susan Tedeschi, Derek Trucks
9. "Going Going Gone" – Doyle Bramhall II, Susan Tedeschi, Derek Trucks
10. "Lift Off" – Tom Misch
11. "Cognac" – Buddy Guy, Jonny Lang
12. "Everything Is Broken" – Sheryl Crow, Bonnie Raitt
13. "Every Day Is a Winding Road" – Sheryl Crow, James Bay
14. "Retrato" – Daniel Santiago, Pedro Martins
15. "B-Side" – Kurt Rosenwinkel, Pedro Martins
16. "Baby, Please Come Home" – Jimmie Vaughan, Bonnie Raitt

=== Disc 2 ===
1. "I Shiver" – Robert Cray
2. "How Long" – The Marcus King Band
3. "Goodbye Carolina" – The Marcus King Band
4. "While My Guitar Gently Weeps" – Eric Clapton, Peter Frampton
5. "Space for the Papa" – Jeff Beck
6. "Big Block" – Jeff Beck
7. "Caroline, No" – Jeff Beck
8. "Cut Em Loose" – Robert Randolph
9. "Hold Back the River" – James Bay
10. "When We Were on Fire" – James Bay
11. "Mas y Mas" – Los Lobos
12. "Am I Wrong?" – Keb' Mo'
13. "Slow Dancing in a Burning Room" – John Mayer
14. "How Blue Can You Get?" – Susan Tedeschi, Derek Trucks
15. "Shame" – Susan Tedeschi, Derek Trucks

=== Disc 3 ===
1. "Is Your Love Big Enough?" – Lianne La Havas
2. "I Say a Little Prayer" – Lianne La Havas
3. "Feed the Babies" – Gary Clark Jr.
4. "I Got My Eyes on You (Locked & Loaded)" – Gary Clark Jr.
5. "Pearl Cadillac" – Gary Clark Jr.
6. "Tonight the Bottle Let Me Down" – Vince Gill, Albert Lee, Jerry Douglas
7. "Tulsa Time" – Vince Gill, Albert Lee, Jerry Douglas, Bradley Walker
8. "Drifting Too Far From the Shore" – Vince Gill, Albert Lee, Jerry Douglas, Bradley Walker
9. "Badge" – Eric Clapton
10. "Layla" – Eric Clapton, John Mayer, Doyle Bramhall II
11. "Purple Rain" – Eric Clapton, Ensemble
12. "High Time We Went" – Eric Clapton, Ensemble

== Track listing DVD/Blu-ray ==
=== Disc 1 ===
1. "Native Stepson" – Sonny Landreth
2. "Wonderful Tonight" – Eric Clapton, Andy Fairweather Low
3. "Lay Down Sally" – Eric Clapton, Andy Fairweather Low
4. "Million Miles" – Bonnie Raitt, Keb’ Mo’, Alan Darby
5. "Son's Gonna Rise" – Citizen Cope, Gary Clark Jr.
6. "Lait" / "De Ushuaia A La Quiaca" – Gustavo Santaolalla
7. "I Wanna Be Your Dog" – Doyle Bramhall II, Susan Tedeschi, Derek Trucks
8. "That's How Strong My Love Is" – Doyle Bramhall II, Susan Tedeschi, Derek Trucks
9. "Going Going Gone" – Doyle Bramhall II, Susan Tedeschi, Derek Trucks
10. "Lift Off" – Tom Misch
11. "Cognac" – Buddy Guy, Jonny Lang
12. "Everything Is Broken" – Sheryl Crow, Bonnie Raitt
13. "Every Day Is a Winding Road" – Sheryl Crow, James Bay
14. "Retrato" – Daniel Santiago, Pedro Martins
15. "B-Side" – Kurt Rosenwinkel, Pedro Martins
16. "Baby, Please Come Home" – Jimmie Vaughan, Bonnie Raitt
17. "I Shiver" – Robert Cray
18. "How Long" – The Marcus King Band
19. "Goodbye Carolina" – The Marcus King Band
20. "While My Guitar Gently Weeps" – Eric Clapton, Peter Frampton
21. "Space for the Papa" – Jeff Beck
22. "Big Block" – Jeff Beck
23. "Caroline, No" – Jeff Beck

=== Disc 2 ===
1. "Cut Em Loose" – Robert Randolph
2. "Hold Back the River" – James Bay
3. "When We Were on Fire" – James Bay
4. "Mas y Mas" – Los Lobos
5. "Am I Wrong?" – Keb' Mo'
6. "Slow Dancing in a Burning Room" – John Mayer
7. "How Blue Can You Get?" – Susan Tedeschi, Derek Trucks
8. "Shame" – Susan Tedeschi, Derek Trucks
9. "Is Your Love Big Enough?" – Lianne La Havas
10. "I Say a Little Prayer" – Lianne La Havas
11. "Feed the Babies" – Gary Clark Jr.
12. "I Got My Eyes on You (Locked & Loaded)" – Gary Clark Jr.
13. "Pearl Cadillac" – Gary Clark Jr.
14. "Tonight the Bottle Let Me Down" – Vince Gill, Albert Lee, Jerry Douglas
15. "Tulsa Time" – Vince Gill, Albert Lee, Jerry Douglas, Bradley Walker
16. "Drifting Too Far From the Shore" – Vince Gill, Albert Lee, Jerry Douglas, Bradley Walker
17. "Badge" – Eric Clapton
18. "Layla" – Eric Clapton, John Mayer, Doyle Bramhall II
19. "Purple Rain" – Eric Clapton, Ensemble
20. "High Time We Went" – Eric Clapton, Ensemble

== Personnel ==
=== House band ===
- Eric Clapton – guitar, vocals, festival artistic producer
- Doyle Bramhall II – guitar, vocals
- Chris Stainton – keyboards
- Paul Carrack – keyboards, vocals
- Nathan East – bass
- Sonny Emory, Steve Gadd – drums
- Katie Kissoon, Sharon White – backing vocals

=== Production ===
- Steve Woolard – supervisor from Rhino
- Lisa Glines – art supervisor
- Fred Davis – package art and design
- John "Crash" Matos – artwork
- Alan Douglas, Jacob Dennis, Joel Evendon – additional engineers
- Hannah Charlesworth, Jaqui Lang, Peter Jackson – festival executive producer
- Michael Eaton – festival and film executive producer
- Martyn Atkins – film director
- James S. Pluta – film producer
- Joel H. Weinstein – legal
- Martin Dacre – legal, film executive producer
- Bob Ludwig – mastering
- Scooter Weintraub – festival artistic producer
- David May – post audio blu-ray DVD producer
- Simon Climie – producer, mixing, festival artistic producer
- Crystal Murphy, Mike Engstrom – product manager
- Audrey Simon, John Srebalus, Julie Temkin, Kent Liu, Matthew Taoatao, Nader Tadros, Sheryl Farber, Susanne Savage – project manager

=== Guests ===
- Billy Gibbons appears courtesy of Concord Records, a Division of Concord Music Group, Inc.
- Bonnie Raitt appears courtesy of Redwing Records.
- Buddy Guy appears courtesy of RCA Records, a Division of Sony Music Entertainment.
- Citizen Cope appears courtesy of Rainwater Recordings, Inc.
- Gary Clark Jr. appears courtesy of Warner Records.
- James Bay appears courtesy of Universal Republic Records.
- Jeff Beck appears courtesy of Rhino Entertainment Company, a Warner Music Group Company.
- Jerry Douglas appears courtesy of Rounder Records, a Division of Concord Music Group, Inc.
- Jimmie Vaughan appears courtesy of the Last Music Company.
- John Mayer appears courtesy of Columbia Records, a Division of Sony Music Entertainment.
- Keb' Mo' appears courtesy of Concord Records, a Division of Concord Music Group, Inc.
- Lianne La Havas appears courtesy of Warner Records UK, a Division of Warner Music UK Limited.
- Peter Frampton appears courtesy of Universal Music Enterprises, a Division of UMG Recordings, Inc.
- Robert Cray appears courtesy of Jay-Vee Records.
- Sonny Landreth appears courtesy of Mascot Records, a Division of Provogue Music Group.
- Tedeschi Trucks Band appears courtesy of Fantasy Records, a Division of Concord Music Group, Inc.
- The Marcus King Band appears courtesy of Fantasy Records, a Division of Concord Music Group, Inc.
- Tom Misch appears courtesy of Beyond The Groove/Kobalt Music Recordings.
- Vince Gill appears courtesy of UMG Nashville, a Division of UMG Recordings, Inc.

== Charts ==
=== Weekly charts ===
Charts for Crossroads Guitar Festival 2019
Chart (2020)	Peak position
Austrian Music DVD (Ö3 Austria)	1
Belgian Albums (Ultratop Flanders)	167
Belgian Albums (Ultratop Wallonia)	182
Danish Vinyl Albums (Hitlisten)	40
French Albums (SNEP)	161
French Physical Albums (SNEP)	51
German Albums (Offizielle Top 100)	14
German Music DVD (BVV)	1
Hungarian Albums (MAHASZ)	10
Irish Music DVD (IRMA)	1
Japanese Albums (Oricon)	100
Japanese Music Blu-ray (Oricon)	20
Japanese Music DVD (Oricon)	17
Polish Albums (ZPAV)	48
Spanish Music DVD (PROMUSICAE)	2
Swiss Albums (Schweizer Hitparade)	8
Swiss Music DVD (Schweizer Hitparade)	1
UK Compilation Albums (OCC)	33
UK Music Videos (OCC)	4
