= Happy Xmas (album) =

Studio album by Eric Clapton
- Released: 12 October 2018
- Recorded: 2017–18
- Genres: Christmas; blues; rock
- Length: 60:45
- Labels: Brushbranch/Surfdog; EPC Enterprises; Polydor (Europe)
- Producers: Eric Clapton; Simon Climie

Eric Clapton chronology
Live in San Diego (2016)	Happy Xmas (2018)	Crossroads Guitar Festival 2019 (2020)

Happy Xmas is the first Christmas album by Eric Clapton as well as his twenty-first solo studio album, which was released on 12 October 2018. It includes 13 covers of Christmas-themed songs (15 on the European re-release), both well-known and relatively obscure ones, arranged in a predominantly blues style, and one new composition by Clapton and his coproducer of the album, Simon Climie.

== Conception ==
During the 23-minute television special A Clapton Christmas, which includes excerpts from a longer interview with producer/musician Simon Climie, Clapton says that the original inspiration for the album came from his wife Melia about three years before the album was produced. She had been listening to the Christmas-themed playlists which her husband created every year on his mobile phone for the end-of-year holiday season; one day, she left him a message on his phone: "Why don't you do a Christmas album?" Clapton was initially reluctant, as many of his favourite artists had done likewise before him, but he was convinced after he started working with pianist and keyboard player Walt Richmond (from The Tractors), who came up with unconventional harmonizations and arrangements for most of the tracks.

"For Love on Christmas Day" was written in early 2018 as "Living in a Dream World", when Clapton completed a fragmentary tune by Simon Climie and wrote lyrics to it. At the time, the album was supposed to be a regular studio album rather than a Christmas one. Upon deciding to make it such, Clapton changed two lines of lyrics in the last verse - the only ones which actually include the word "Christmas".

"Home for the Holidays" and "It's Christmas" are taken from American soul singer Anthony Hamilton's 2014 holiday-themed album, also called Home for the Holidays. Clapton discovered his music on Spotify and called him "the best soul singer on the planet".

The popular Christmas carol "Jingle Bells" is given here a partly electronic arrangement, similar in style to the work of Swedish musician, producer and DJ Tim Bergling, a.k.a. Avicii, who committed suicide shortly before Clapton started working on the album. His young daughters were fans of Avicii and convinced Clapton to turn "Jingle Bells" into a tribute to him, after he had opted for a more bluesy arrangement.

The song "Christmas in My Hometown", according to Clapton's comments on a flexi disc included with the deluxe edition of the album, was discovered by him on a Christmas compilation album, which he found by scouring the Internet while looking for unusual Christmas songs to cover; in this case, it was a country album, which included Gene Autry among its featured artists. The original version of this song, recorded by its writer Sonny James in 1954, sounded to Clapton like a pub song and reminded him of a scene he saw on a TV documentary, depicting a group of Romani people singing and having fun in a pub, so he arranged it in that style.

== Artwork ==
The artwork for the album, consisting of cartoonish, childlike drawings, was created by Clapton himself, who drafted all of it very quickly on some sheets of paper he found in his hotel. The front cover features a Santa character who looks vaguely like Clapton, while the inner spread includes a Santa sleigh pulled by reindeer under a four-pointed Christmas star, as well as a Christmas tree. In his interview with Climie, Clapton jokes that the artwork took him "months and months" of failed attempts, before revealing the truth. He also states that he was inspired by Bob Dylan, who, as an accomplished painter, came up with his own artwork for several of his albums. The "Happy Xmas"/"E.C." lettering on the front cover, as well as the whole of the tracklist on the back, are also in Clapton’s own handwriting.

== Track listing ==
No.	Title	Writer(s)	Length
1.	"White Christmas"	Irving Berlin (Arranged by Eric Clapton and Simon Climie)	2:58
2.	"Away in a Manger (Once in Royal David's City)"	Traditional, William J. Kirkpatrick	4:44
3.	"For Love on Christmas Day" (new song)	Eric Clapton, Simon Climie, Dennis Morgan	3:36
4.	"Everyday Will Be Like a Holiday"	William Bell, Booker T. Jones	3:38
5.	"Christmas Tears"	Robert Wilson, Sonny Thompson	4:22
6.	"Home for the Holidays"	Anthony Hamilton, Kelvin Wooten	4:00
7.	"Jingle Bells (In Memory of Avicii)"	James Lord Pierpont (arr. Clapton, Climie, Salif Keita, Manfila Kante)	5:58
8.	"Christmas in My Hometown"	Sonny James	2:51
9.	"It's Christmas"	Anthony Hamilton, Kelvin Wooten, Brandon Davis	4:43
10.	"Sentimental Moments"	Friedrich Holländer, Ralph Freed	4:06
11.	"Lonesome Christmas"	Lloyd Glenn, Lowell Fulson	3:51
12.	"Silent Night"	Franz Xaver Gruber, Joseph Mohr, John Freeman Young (arr. Clapton, Climie, Walt Richmond)	4:02
13.	"Merry Christmas Baby"	Lou Baxter, Johnny Moore	4:11
14.	"Have Yourself a Merry Little Christmas"	Ralph Blane, Hugh Martin	3:31
15.	"A Little Bit of Christmas Love" (bonus track, adapted lyrics)	Rosco Gordon	2:44
16.	"You Always Hurt the One You Love" (bonus track)	Allan Roberts, Doris Fisher	3:58

- Tracks 15 and 16 were originally released, for Record Store Day 2018, on a 12" shaped picture disc, and later included on the European December 2018 re-release of the album.

== Personnel ==
- Eric Clapton – lead vocals, guitars
- Walt Richmond – acoustic piano, keyboards
- Toby Baker – keyboards
- Simon Climie – keyboards, acoustic guitar, percussion, programming
- Tim Carmon – Hammond organ
- Dirk Powell – accordion, fiddle
- Doyle Bramhall II – guitars
- Nathan East – bass guitar
- Jim Keltner – drums
- Paul Waller – drum programming
- Nick Ingman – choir and string arrangements
- Isobel Griffiths – strings contractor
- Tim Gill – cello
- Mary Scully – double bass
- Peter Lale – viola
- Perry Montague-Mason – violin
- Emlyn Singleton – violin
- Melia Clapton – backing vocals
- Sophie Clapton – backing vocals
- Sharon White – backing vocals
- Metro Voices – choir

== Production ==
- Producers – Eric Clapton and Simon Climie
- Engineer – Alan Douglas
- Mixing – Simon Climie
- Mastering – Bob Ludwig at Gateway Mastering (Portland, ME).
- Layout – Jessie Kohn and John Logsdon
- Artwork – Eric Clapton

== Charts ==
=== Weekly charts ===
Chart (2018)	Peak position
Austrian Albums (Ö3 Austria)	45
Belgian Albums (Ultratop Flanders)	64
Belgian Albums (Ultratop Wallonia)	114
Canadian Albums (Billboard)	97
Czech Albums (ČNS IFPI)	23
Dutch Albums (Album Top 100)	111
German Albums (Offizielle Top 100)	37
Italian Albums (FIMI)	75
Japan Hot Albums (Billboard Japan)	42
Japanese Albums (Oricon)	23
Scottish Albums (Official Charts)	47
Spanish Albums (PROMUSICAE)	34
Swiss Albums (Schweizer Hitparade)	73
UK Albums (Official Charts)	97
US Billboard 200	84
US Top Holiday Albums (Billboard)	1
US Top Rock Albums (Billboard)	11

=== Year-end charts ===
Chart (2019)	Position
US Top Rock Albums (Billboard)	73
