= It's in the Way That You Use It =

Single by Eric Clapton

from the album August
- Released: 1986 (US); March 23, 1987 (UK)
- Genre: Pop rock
- Length: 4:11
- Label: Warner Bros.
- Songwriters: Eric Clapton; Robbie Robertson
- Producers: Eric Clapton; Tom Dowd

Eric Clapton singles chronology
"Holy Mother" (1986)	"It's in the Way That You Use It" (1986)	"Behind the Mask" (1987)

"It's in the Way That You Use It" is a song by the English rock musician Eric Clapton released as one of the singles from his tenth solo studio album August (1986). It was written by Clapton and Robbie Robertson. The song, which is used as the theme tune to the Martin Scorsese film The Color of Money, was produced by Clapton himself with the help of Tom Dowd, who acted as the assistant producer. The release sold more than 500,000 copies worldwide.

== Composition ==
The song was specially written as part of the film soundtrack for the movie The Color of Money, which was directed by Martin Scorsese and starred Paul Newman and Tom Cruise as pool sharks. The recording first appeared as part of the film soundtrack, before it was released as a single or on Eric Clapton's 1986 studio album release. Clapton wrote "It's in the Way That You Use It" with Robbie Robertson, whose work with The Band in the 1960s encouraged Eric Clapton to get away from the long, heavy solos he was playing with Cream. Robertson was in charge of the music for The Color of Money, but because he was not finished with his first solo album, his record company would not let him sing on any of the songs. He got around it by contributing instrumental songs to the soundtrack. The original song title was "The Gift".

The collaboration between Clapton and Robertson was initiated by Scorsese, who had rejected one of Clapton's song for The Color of Money. Robertson was concurrently assembling material for his album Robbie Robertson and developing instrumental tracks for The Color of Money at the time and received a phone call from Clapton asking for assistance on the rejected track. When Clapton contacted Robertson again a few days later to check his progress, Robertson informed him that he had been placing his attention on other musical projects and that the timing was not right for him to focus on the collaboration. Clapton was dissatisfied with this answer and insisted on the song's completion. According to Robertson, Clapton was imminently expecting the birth of a new child at the time and reportedly told Robertson "don't tell me about timing" as a rebuttal to Robertson's comment. At the conclusion of the phone call, Robertson temporarily retreated from one of his recording session to work on a song for Clapton. An hour later, he called Clapton again to sing the words he wrote for "It's in the Way You Use It."

I finished singing it, picked up the phone and I could hear him laughing like mad. I said. Okay, let me hear the joke. He said, 'Oh, this works! This is fantastic! Read them off to me so I can write 'em down'.

— Robbie Robertson

At the conclusion of the phone call with Clapton, Robertson mentioned that he yet to finish all of the lyrics for "It's in the Way That You Use It". When Robertson was in Dublin working with U2, Clapton called Robertson asking for the remainder of the lyrics, saying "I'm in the studio singing the song and my voice is about to give out! What are the rest of the words?". After Robertson sent Clapton the rest of the lyrics, the song was then finished roughly an hour later.

== Release ==
"It's in the Way That You Use It" was released as an official single by Warner Bros. in late 1986 for the following territories: Australia, Canada, the United States and Portugal. For the rest of the world, mainly including Europe, particularly Germany and the United Kingdom, the single was released in March 1987. The single was released on both 7" and 12" formats. The single was also released in Japan.

In the UK, the 7" single included "Bad Influence Duck" as the B-side. The 12" single was also appended with the songs "Same Old Ways" and "Pretty Girl".

== Chart performance ==
The single release did not chart on the Billboard Hot 100 singles chart, although it sold a total of 183,291 copies in the United States. However, "It's in the Way That You Use It" reached number one on the Billboard Mainstream Rock Tracks chart and spent a total of fifteen weeks on the listing. In Canada, the song did not enter the national single charts either, selling 1,493 copies in total. The single pealed at number 77 in the United Kingdom, selling a total of 34,294 copies overall. The song stayed four weeks on the chart, compiled by the Official Charts Company in Britain. It reached No. 24 in Australia, the song's highest chart position. In total, the single sold more than 500,000 copies worldwide.

== Music video ==
A music video featuring Eric Clapton performing the song in front of blue lights, alongside clips from The Color of Money was released to accompany the single release.

== Critical reception ==
Cashbox said that it "contains a blistering volley of lead guitar genius." Billboard called it a "neatly executed rocker [that] strongly recalls his mid-'70s."

== Personnel ==
- Eric Clapton – lead vocals, rhythm guitar, lead guitar, backing vocals
- Gary Brooker – keyboards, backing vocals
- Richard Cottle – synthesizer
- Laurence Cottle – bass guitar
- Henry Spinetti – drums

== Charts ==
Chart (1986–1987)	Peak position
Australia (Kent Music Report)	24
UK Singles (Official Charts)	77
US Mainstream Rock (Billboard)	1

== In popular culture ==
The song was briefly featured in season 6 episode 2 ("Lawnmower Maintenance and Postnatal Care") of Community. The song was also featured in the season 4 episode of Rick and Morty "The Vat of Acid Episode." Both shows were created by Dan Harmon.

It was also featured in season 3 episode 1 ("Chapter 14") of Eastbound and Down.
