= The Cream of Clapton =

Greatest hits album by Eric Clapton
- Released: 7 March 1995 (U.S.)
- Genre: Rock, blues rock
- Length: 78:00 (US), 70:00 (UK)
- Label: Polydor
- Producer: Various

Eric Clapton chronology
| From the Cradle (1994) | The Cream of Clapton (1995) | Crossroads 2: Live in the Seventies (1996) |

The Cream of Clapton is an Eric Clapton compilation album released in 1995. Additionally, the European and U.S.-versions have a different track listings. The European version had already been released as The Best of Eric Clapton (Polydor 511072) in 1991, though without the track "I Can't Stand It".

In addition to profiling Clapton's solo work, the album also includes Clapton's involvement in the bands Cream, Blind Faith, and Derek and the Dominos. The sole track penned by Clapton on Blind Faith's studio album is the only one included here.

Professional ratings
Review scores
| Source | Rating |
|---|---|
| Allmusic | link |

== Track listing ==
=== U.S. version ===
1. Cream: "I Feel Free" (Pete Brown, Jack Bruce) – 2:52 (from Fresh Cream, 1966)
2. "Sunshine of Your Love" (Brown, Bruce, Eric Clapton) – 4:11 (from Disraeli Gears, 1967)
3. "White Room" (Brown, Bruce) – 5:00 (from Wheels of Fire, 1968)
4. "Crossroads" (Live) (Robert Johnson, arr. by Clapton) – 4:16 (from Wheels of Fire, 1968)
5. "Badge" (Clapton, George Harrison) – 2:46 (from Goodbye, 1969)
6. Blind Faith: "Presence of the Lord" (Clapton) – 4:50 (from Blind Faith, 1969)
7. Solo: "Blues Power" (Clapton, Leon Russell) – 3:11 (from Eric Clapton, 1970)
8. "After Midnight" (J.J. Cale) – 2:53 (from Eric Clapton, 1970)
9. "Let It Rain" (Bonnie Bramlett, Delaney Bramlett, Clapton) – 5:04 (from Eric Clapton, 1970)
10. Derek and the Dominos: "Bell Bottom Blues" (Clapton) – 5:02 (from Layla and Other Assorted Love Songs, 1970)
11. "Layla" (Clapton, Jim Gordon) – 7:05 (from Layla and Other Assorted Love Songs, 1970)
12. Solo: "I Shot the Sheriff" (Bob Marley) – 4:23 (from 461 Ocean Boulevard, 1974)
13. "Let It Grow" (Clapton) – 4:58 (from 461 Ocean Boulevard, 1974)
14. "Knockin' on Heaven's Door" (Bob Dylan) – 4:22 (Non-album single, 1975)
15. "Hello Old Friend" (Clapton) – 3:36 (from No Reason to Cry, 1976)
16. "Cocaine" (Cale) – 3:39 (from Slowhand, 1977)
17. "Wonderful Tonight" (Clapton) – 3:42 (from Slowhand, 1977)
18. "Promises" (Richard Feldman, Roger Linn) – 3:04 (from Backless, 1978)
19. "I Can't Stand It" (Clapton) – 4:09 (from Another Ticket, 1981)

=== Great Britain, French, Australian and Canadian version ===
Polydor 521881

1. Derek and the Dominos: "Layla" (Clapton, Gordon) – 7:10 (from Layla and Other Assorted Love Songs, 1970)
2. Cream: "Badge" (Clapton, Harrison) – 2:42 (from Goodbye, 1969)
3. "I Feel Free" (Brown, Bruce) – 2:54 (from Fresh Cream, 1966)
4. "Sunshine of Your Love" (Brown, Bruce, Clapton) – 4:10 (from Disraeli Gears, 1967)
5. "Crossroads" (Live) (Johnson) – 4:13 (from Wheels of Fire, 1968)
6. "Strange Brew" (Clapton, Felix Pappalardi, Gail Collins) - 2:45 (from Disraeli Gears, 1967)
7. "White Room" (Brown, Bruce) – 4:57 (from Wheels of Fire, 1968)
8. Derek and the Dominos: "Bell Bottom Blues" (Clapton) – 5:06 (from Layla and Other Assorted Love Songs, 1970)
9. Solo: "Cocaine" (Cale) – 3:35 (from Slowhand, 1977)
10. "I Shot the Sheriff" (Marley) – 4:22 (from 461 Ocean Boulevard, 1974)
11. "After Midnight" (Cale) – 3:11 (from Eric Clapton, 1970)
12. "Swing Low, Sweet Chariot" (Traditional, arr. by Eric Clapton) - 3:27 (from There's One in Every Crowd, 1975)
13. "Lay Down Sally" (Clapton, Marcy Levy, George Terry) - 3:50 (from Slowhand, 1977)
14. "Knockin' on Heaven's Door" (Dylan) – 4:23 (Non-album single, 1975)
15. "Wonderful Tonight" (Clapton) – 3:41 (from Slowhand, 1977)
16. "Let It Grow" (Clapton) – 4:56 (from 461 Ocean Boulevard, 1974)
17. "Promises" (Feldman, Linn) – 3:01 (from Backless, 1978)
18. "I Can't Stand It" (Clapton) – 4:07 (from Another Ticket, 1981)

== Chart performance ==
=== Weekly charts ===
| Chart (1994–95) | Peak position |
|---|---|
| Danish Albums (Hitlisten) | 3 |
| European Albums (IFPI) | 14 |
| Finnish Albums (Suomen virallinen lista) | 4 |
| French Albums (SNEP) | 141 |
| German Albums (Offizielle Top 100) | 17 |
| Hong Kong Albums (IFPI) | 4 |
| New Zealand Albums (RMNZ) | 9 |
| Norwegian Albums (VG-lista) | 4 |
| Swedish Albums (Sverigetopplistan) | 3 |
| UK Albums (OCC) | 3 |
| US Billboard 200 | 80 |
| US Top Catalog Albums (Billboard) | 15 |

== Certifications ==
| Region | Certification | Certified units/sales |
|---|---|---|
| Belgium (BRMA) | Gold | 25,000^{*} |
| New Zealand (RMNZ) | 3× Platinum | 45,000^{^} |
| United Kingdom (BPI) | Gold | 100,000^{^} |
| United States (RIAA) | 2× Platinum | 2,000,000^{^} |
Summaries
| Europe (IFPI) | 2× Platinum | 2,000,000^{*} |
^{*} Sales figures based on certification alone.^{^} Shipments figures based on certification alone.
