= 20th Century Masters – The Millennium Collection: The Best of Eric Clapton =

Compilation album by Eric Clapton
- Released: June 15, 2004
- Recorded: 1970–1978
- Genre: Rock
- Length: 48:10
- Label: Polydor

Eric Clapton chronology
Me and Mr. Johnson (2004)	20th Century Masters – The Millennium Collection: The Best of Eric Clapton (2004)	Sessions for Robert J (2004)

20th Century Masters – The Millennium Collection: The Best of Eric Clapton is a compilation album by the British rock musician Eric Clapton. It was released on 15 June 2004, by Polydor Records and is part of Universal's 20th Century Masters – The Millennium Collection series.

== Background and commercial performance ==
The compilation album has eleven tracks that Clapton recorded in the 1970s both as a solo artist and with Derek and the Dominos. Glyn Johns produced the album in association with Tom Dowd. Although the release sold 1,366,610 copies in the United States, it has not been certified platinum by the Recording Industry Association of America.

== Critical reception ==
The AllMusic critic Stephen Thomas Erlewine thinks that the compilation release "is an excellent distillation of his [Eric Clapton's] signature songs of the '70s". He continues, "While it focuses on his solo recordings, it's not limited to them, throwing in two cuts from Derek and the Dominos -- "Layla," of course, plus "Bell Bottom Blues"—which help complete the portrait of Clapton in the '70s." Erlewine also points the way to Clapton's massively successful compilation Timepieces: Best Of Eric Clapton by noting that "20th Century Masters is essentially a revised Time Pieces, both running 11 tracks, nine of which are shared between the two records." ("Bell Bottom Blues" and "Let It Rain" replace "Willie and the Hand Jive" and "Swing Low, Sweet Chariot", respectively). He finishes his review by rating the album with 4.5 of possible 5 stars.

== Track listing ==
1. "I Shot the Sheriff" (Bob Marley) – 4:26
2. "After Midnight" (J.J. Cale) – 2:53
3. "Knockin' on Heaven's Door" (Bob Dylan) – 4:24
4. "Wonderful Tonight" (Eric Clapton) – 3:45
5. "Layla" (Clapton · Jim Gordon) – 7:06
6. "Cocaine" (Cale) – 3:40
7. "Lay Down Sally" (Clapton · George Terry · Marcy Levy) – 3:55
8. "Bell Bottom Blues" (Clapton) – 5:04
9. "Promises" (Richard Feldman · Roger Linn) – 3:03
10. "Let It Rain" (Clapton · Bonnie Bramlett) – 5:03
11. "Let It Grow" (Clapton) – 4:58

== Chart positions and certifications ==
=== Weekly charts ===
Chart (2005)	Peak position
US Top Internet Albums (Billboard)	230

Chart (2011)	Peak position
US Billboard 200	66
US Top Catalog Albums (Billboard)	4

Chart (2013)	Peak position
US Top Album Sales (Billboard)	15

=== Year-end charts ===
Chart (2011)	Position
US Billboard 200	195
Chart (2013)	Position
US Billboard 200	200

=== Certifications and sales ===
Region	Certification	Certified units/sales
United States	—	1,366,610
