= Clapton (1973 album) =

Compilation album by Eric Clapton
- Released: 1973
- Recorded: 1969–1970
- Genre: Rock
- Length: 37:48
- Label: Polydor; PD 5526
- Producer: see track listings for details

Eric Clapton chronology
In Concert (1973)	Clapton (1973)	Eric Clapton's Rainbow Concert (1973)

Professional ratings
Review scores
Source	Rating
Allmusic	2/5 stars

Clapton is a 1973 compilation album of Eric Clapton's early solo work. It was the second of two such compilations that Polydor Records would issue; the first, Eric Clapton at His Best, was released in late 1972.

Although available in other territories as well, Clapton was largely released to address the North American market, in order for Polydor to exploit Clapton's back catalog as, prior to 1972, Polydor had licensed Clapton's recordings to Atco/Atlantic Records for North American distribution. Now out of print, Clapton, available during the years 1973-76, is one of the rarer titles in Clapton's catalog.

The album contains songs from Clapton's eponymous 1970 album, and from the lone studio album by Clapton's 1970-71 band Derek and the Dominos, Layla and Other Assorted Love Songs (1970).

== Track listing ==
=== Side one ===
1. "Told You For the Last Time" (Bonnie Bramlett/Steve Cropper) - 2:30
  - From Eric Clapton (1970). Produced by Delaney Bramlett.
2. "Don't Know Why" (Bonnie Bramlett/Eric Clapton) - 3:18
  - From Eric Clapton.
3. "Have You Ever Loved a Woman" (Billy Myles) - 6:59
  - From Layla and Other Assorted Love Songs. Produced by The Dominos; executive producer Tom Dowd.
4. "Nobody Knows You When You're Down and Out" (Jimmy Cox) - 4:57
  - From Layla and Other Assorted Love Songs.

=== Side two ===
1. "Lovin' You Lovin' Me" (Bonnie Bramlett/Eric Clapton) - 3:36
  - From Eric Clapton.
2. "Tell the Truth" (Eric Clapton/Bobby Whitlock) - 6:37
  - From Layla and Other Assorted Love Songs.
3. "Bad Boy" (Delaney Bramlett/Eric Clapton) - 3:50
  - From Eric Clapton.
4. "Bell Bottom Blues" (Eric Clapton) - 5:01
  - From Layla and Other Assorted Love Songs.
