= The Cream of Eric Clapton =

Greatest hits album by Eric Clapton
- Released: September 1987 (Australia, UK and Germany)
- Recorded: 1966–1987
- Genre: Rock
- Length: 70:35
- Label: RSO (Polydor / Polygram)
- Producer: Various

Eric Clapton chronology
| August (1986) | The Cream of Eric Clapton (1987) | Crossroads (1988) |

The Cream of Eric Clapton is a greatest hits album by English guitar player Eric Clapton. It includes work from two of his bands, Cream, and Derek and the Dominos as well as his solo work. It was released in 1987 in the UK.

In 1989 a Polygram released a video compilation, under the same title and using similar artwork.

== Track listing ==
1. Derek and the Dominos – "Layla" (Eric Clapton, Jim Gordon)
2. Cream – "Badge" (Clapton, George Harrison)
3. Cream – "I Feel Free" (Pete Brown, Jack Bruce)
4. Cream – "Sunshine of Your Love" (Brown, Bruce, Clapton)
5. Cream – "Crossroads" (Robert Johnson) (CD only bonus track)
6. Cream – "Strange Brew" (Clapton, Gail Collins Pappalardi, Felix Pappalardi)
7. Cream – "White Room" (Brown, Bruce)
8. Eric Clapton – "Cocaine" (J. J. Cale)
9. Eric Clapton – "I Shot the Sheriff" (Bob Marley)
10. Eric Clapton – "Behind the Mask" (Chris Mosdell, Ryuichi Sakamoto)
11. Eric Clapton – "Forever Man" (Jerry Lynn Williams)
12. Eric Clapton – "Lay Down Sally" (Clapton, Marcy Levy, George Terry)
13. Eric Clapton – "Knockin' on Heaven's Door" (Bob Dylan)
14. Eric Clapton – "Wonderful Tonight" (Clapton)
15. Eric Clapton – "Let It Grow" (Clapton)
16. Eric Clapton – "Promises" (Richard Feldman, Roger Linn)
17. Eric Clapton – "I've Got a Rock 'n' Roll Heart" (Steve Diamond, Tony Seals, Troy Seals, Eddie Setser)

== Japanese edition ==
The Japanese compilation of that title has a slightly different track listing, it includes the full version of "After Midnight", which was re-recorded in 1987 and released as a single in 1988.

== Chart performance ==
=== Weekly charts ===
| Chart (1988–2016) | Peak position |
|---|---|
| Australian Albums (ARIA) | 12 |
| Australian Catalogue Albums (ARIA) | 17 |
| Dutch Albums (Album Top 100) | 78 |
| UK Albums (OCC) | 3 |

== Certifications ==
| Region | Certification | Certified units/sales |
|---|---|---|
| Australia (ARIA) | Platinum | 70,000^{^} |
| Canada (Music Canada) | Gold | 50,000^{^} |
| France (SNEP) | Gold | 100,000^{*} |
| New Zealand (RMNZ) | Platinum | 15,000^{^} |
| Switzerland (IFPI Switzerland) | Gold | 25,000^{^} |
| United Kingdom (BPI) | 3× Platinum | 1,000,000 |
| United States (RIAA) | 2× Platinum | 2,000,000^{^} |
^{*} Sales figures based on certification alone.^{^} Shipments figures based on certification alone.
