= Backtrackin' =

Compilation album by Eric Clapton
- Released: May 1984
- Recorded: 1966–1980
- Genre: Rock
- Length: 105:54
- Label: Polydor

Eric Clapton chronology
Money and Cigarettes (1983)	Backtrackin' (1984)	Behind the Sun (1985)

Professional ratings
Review scores
Source	Rating
AllMusic	link

Backtrackin' is a two-disc compilation album by Eric Clapton spanning the years 1966 to 1980. It was released in 1984. The compilation contains all of Clapton's best known songs with Cream, Blind Faith, Derek and the Dominos, and his solo 1970s work through his 1980 live album Just One Night. This compilation album is made in Germany and is only available in the United States as an import. It was originally released by Starblend Records, and has since been reissued by Polydor Records. This 2 CD compilation is currently out of print in some markets while still available in some form in others.

== Track listing ==
The original vinyl album had each side as its own section. Side 1 (tracks 1–6 on CD 1) was listed as "singles". Side 2 (tracks 7–11 on CD 1) was listed as "history". Side 3 (tracks 1–6 on CD 2) was listed as "classics". Side 4 (tracks 7–11 on CD 2) wrapped it up with live material. The same section listings can be found on the CD pressings.

=== Disc 1 ===
1. "I Shot the Sheriff" (Bob Marley) – 4:26
2. "Knockin' on Heaven's Door" (Bob Dylan) – 4:26
3. "Lay Down Sally" (Eric Clapton, Marcy Levy, George Terry) – 3:55
4. "Promises" (Richard Feldman, Roger Linn) – 3:05
5. "Swing Low, Sweet Chariot" (Traditional, arr. by Clapton) – 3:35
6. "Wonderful Tonight" (Clapton) – 3:45
7. "Sunshine of Your Love" (Pete Brown, Jack Bruce, Clapton) – 4:14 + Cream
8. "Tales of Brave Ulysses" (Clapton, Martin Sharp) – 2:50 + Cream
9. "Badge" (Clapton, George Harrison) – 2:46 + Cream
10. "Little Wing" (Jimi Hendrix) – 5:38 + Derek & The Dominos
11. "Layla" (Clapton, Jim Gordon) – 7:10 + Derek & The Dominos

=== Disc 2 ===
1. "Cocaine" (J.J. Cale) – 3:40
2. "Strange Brew" (Clapton, Gail Collins, Felix Pappalardi) – 2:48 + Cream
3. "Spoonful" (Willie Dixon) – 6:32 + Cream
4. "Let It Rain" (Bonnie Bramlett, Delaney Bramlett, Clapton) – 5:08
5. "Have You Ever Loved a Woman?" (Billy Myles) – 7:04 + Derek & The Dominos
6. "Presence of the Lord" (Clapton) – 4:49 + Blind Faith
7. "Crossroads" (Live) (Robert Johnson) – 4:17 + Cream
8. "Roll It Over" (Live) (Clapton, Bobby Whitlock) – 6:39 + Derek & The Dominos
9. "Can't Find My Way Home" (Live) (Steve Winwood) – 5:16
10. "Blues Power" (Live) (Clapton, Leon Russell) – 7:26
11. "Further on Up the Road" (Live) (Joe Medwick, Don Robey) – 7:08

== Personnel ==
- Eric Clapton – guitars, vocals (all tracks except A8 and B6)
- Yvonne Elliman – backing vocals (A1, A2, A3, A5, A6 and B9)
- George Terry – backing vocals (A1), guitar (A1, A2, A3, A4, A5, A6, B1 and B9)
- Dick Sims – organ (A1, A2, A5 and A6), Keyboards (A4 and B1)
- Albhy Galuten – piano (A1)
- Carl Radle – bass (A1, A2, A3, A4, A5, A6, A10, A11, B1, B4, B5, B8 and B9), percussion (A11)
- Jamie Oldaker – drums (A1, A2, A3, A4, A5, A6, B1 and B9)
- Marcy Levy – backing vocals (A2, A3, A4, A5, A6 and B9)
- Jack Bruce – bass (A7, A8, A9, B2, B3, B7), vocals (A7, A8, B2, B3 and B7), Harmonica (B3 and B7)
- Ginger Baker – drums (A7, A8, A9, B2, B3, B6 and B7)
- Felix Pappalardi – keyboards (A9)
- George Harrison (credited as L'Angelo Misterioso) – rhythm guitar (A9)
- Duane Allman – guitar (A10, A11, B5 and B8)
- Bobby Whitlock – keyboards (A10, A11 and B5), acoustic guitar (A11), organ (B4 and B8)
- Jim Gordon – drums (A10, A11, B4, B5 and B8), piano (A11)
- Rita Coolidge – backing vocals (B4)
- Delaney Bramlett – backing vocals (B4), rhythm guitar (B4)
- Bonny Bramlett – backing vocals (B4)
- Leon Russell – piano (B4)
- Stevie Winwood – keyboards (B6), vocals (B6)
- Rich Grech – bass (B6)
- Chris Stainton – keyboards (B10 and B11)
- Albert Lee – guitar (B10 and B11), keyboards (B10 and B11), vocals (B10 and B11)
- Dave Markee – bass (B10 and B11)
- Henry Spinetti – drums (B10 and B11)

== Charts ==
Chart (1984)	Peak position
Dutch Albums (Album Top 100)	79
New Zealand Albums (RMNZ)	35
UK Albums (OCC)	29
