= Let It Grow (disambiguation) =

Let It Grow may refer to:

- "Let It Grow", a song by Eric Clapton on the 1974 album 461 Ocean Boulevard
- A song by John Perry Barlow and Bob Weir, Part II of the "Weather Report Suite", first recorded by the Grateful Dead on Wake of the Flood
- A song by Renaissance on the album Ashes Are Burning
- A song featured in the film The Lorax which became an Internet meme in late 2016.
- A joint campaign by Botanic Gardens Conservation International (BCGI), European Association of Zoos and Aquaria (EAZA) and the European Network of Science Centres and Museums (ECSITE) on biodiversity loss
