= Let It Rain (Eric Clapton song) =

Single by Eric Clapton

from the album Eric Clapton at His Best
- B-side: "Easy Now"
- Released: August 1972
- Genre: Rock
- Length: 5:02
- Label: Polydor
- Songwriters: Eric Clapton and Bonnie Bramlett
- Producer: Delaney Bramlett

Eric Clapton singles chronology
| "Blues Power" (1970) | "Let It Rain" (1972) | "I Shot the Sheriff" (1974) |

"Let It Rain" is a song and single written and released by the British rock musician Eric Clapton and Bonnie Bramlett; it appears on his 1970 debut studio album Eric Clapton. In 1972 it was released as a single as part of the promotion for his compilation album Eric Clapton at His Best.

Like Clapton's "Strange Brew", the song was originally recorded with other lyrics. The original version, titled "She Rides", is available on the expanded edition of the album.

== Composition ==
AllMusic writer Matthew Greenwald notes, the song is "led by a striking electric guitar riff" with "the melody [being] woven elegantly around the simple, almost folk-like chord changes". Speaking to the lyrics, the critic recalled "the clever use of "rain" and "reign" regarding the power of love is the core here" and thinks that "Clapton and Bramlett utilize it quite well.” Regarding the instrumental music work on the title, Greenwald finishes his song analysis by stating the "song has some striking instrumental sections, including a lovely, brief section by Stephen Stills". The song is in the key of D major. The melody has a strong resemblance to that of Stills's own song "Questions", recorded by both Buffalo Springfield and Crosby, Stills, Nash & Young, and Clapton himself acknowledged its influence on "Let It Rain".

== Release ==
The song was released with the B-side of "Easy Now" in 1972 on a 7" vinyl gramophone record. Besides being released as a single in 1972 and on the original album in 1970, the song is featured on various t, including Eric Clapton at His Best (1972), Backtrackin' (1984), Crossroads (1988), The Cream of Clapton (1995) and Complete Clapton (2007). A live interpretation of the track can be found on the video album Live at Montreux 1986, released on September 19, 2006. In total, the track has been released on over 15 albums. Live concert versions by Derek & the Dominos are featured on their albums In Concert (1973) and Live at the Fillmore (1994).

== Critical reception ==
In his review of Clapton's debut album, AllMusic critic Stephen Thomas Erlewine likes that the title "features extended solos.” He also notes, that the song consists of a "pop element.” Fellow critic Greenwald recalls the piece as "one of Eric Clapton's first self-written classics" and goes on to say the song "showcased the influence that Delaney Bramlett" had on Clapton at the time. Robert Christgau finds in his album review that "Let It Rain" deserves a "classic status.” Billboard described it as a "strong rhythm ballad."

== Musicians ==
- Eric Clapton – lead vocals, rhythm guitar, lead guitar
- Delaney Bramlett – rhythm guitar, backing vocals
- Stephen Stills – guitar solo (bridge), bass guitar
- Leon Russell – piano
- Bobby Whitlock – organ, backing vocals
- Jim Gordon – drums
- Carl Radle - bass guitar
- Dave Mason - guitar
- Jerry Allison – backing vocals
- Bonnie Bramlett – backing vocals
- Rita Coolidge – backing vocals
- Sonny Curtis – backing vocals

== Chart positions ==
=== Weekly charts ===
| Chart (1972) | Peak position |
|---|---|
| Australia (Kent Music Report) | 99 |
| Canadian Top Singles (RPM) | 42 |
| US Billboard Hot 100 | 48 |
