= 12-12-12: The Concert for Sandy Relief (album) =

Compilation album by Various artists
- Released: January 3, 2013
- Recorded: December 12, 2012
- Venue: Madison Square Garden
- Genre: Pop rock
- Length: 127:35
- Label: Columbia
- Producer: Dolan · Sykes · Weinstein

The 12-12-12: The Concert for Sandy Relief is a compilation album by various rock and pop music artists, recorded live during the Hurricane Sandy relief concert 12-12-12: The Concert for Sandy Relief, held in New York's Madison Square Garden. The album was released on January 3, 2013 in the United States, and a European version was released on January 18 later the same year.

== Content ==
The album features best-of live performances by Eric Clapton, Adam Sandler, Paul Shaffer, Bon Jovi, Paul McCartney, Bruce Springsteen, Roger Waters, The Rolling Stones, Alicia Keys, Billy Joel, The Who and Chris Martin. The recording of these performances took place while the mentioned artists performed at 12-12-12: The Concert for Sandy Relief on December 31, 2012-January 1, 2013 in New York's Madison Square Garden. The album was released as a double compact disc with musical material of over nearly two and a half hours under Columbia Records. Performers who are not included on the album release are: Billy Crystal, Susan Sarandon, Brian Williams, Ben Stiller, Whoopi Goldberg, Kristen Stewart, Tony Danza, Jon Stewart, Chelsea Clinton, Jimmy Fallon, Stephen Colbert, Sean Combs, Steve Buscemi, Chris Rock, Kanye West, Seth Meyers, Bobby Moynihan, Jack McBrayer, Jake Gyllenhaal, Blake Lively, Katie Holmes, Jason Sudeikis, Leonardo DiCaprio, Jamie Foxx, Quentin Tarantino, Christoph Waltz and Olivia Wilde.

== Chart performance ==
In Europe, the compilation album was not very successful peaking at position 83 on Switzerlands Schweizer Hitparade in February 2013. The 12-12-12: The Concert for Sandy Relief album reached number 60 in the Netherlands album chart, compiled by MegaCharts. On both of these album charts, the album stayed only one week, selling about 1,000 copies in each country. In Belgium, however, the all-star release placed itself on position 46 in Flanders and reached number 31 on the Ultratop Wallonia chart. In Flanders, the album stayed seven weeks on the chart, in Wallonia twelve weeks, making Belgium the most successful European territory in which the album reached the official national charts.

== Critical reception ==
Professional ratings
Review scores
Source	Rating
AllMusic	3/5 stars

For his AllMusic review, critic Stephen Thomas Erlewine notes the album is rare "star-studded" release, featuring "British classic rock royalty" with artists like "Roger Waters, the Who, The Rolling Stones and Eric Clapton". Erlewine, however, dislikes that "there is nothing from Kanye West and Dave Grohls collaboration with Paul McCartney" on the album. The critic mentions Eric Clapton's performance, stating "Clapton [is really] tearing into the Derek & the Dominos song 'Got to Get Better in a Little While'". Finishing his review for the music website, Erlewine awarded the release three out of five possible stars.

== Track listing ==
=== Disc one ===
1. "Land of Hope and Dreams" – Bruce Springsteen & the E Street Band
2. "Wrecking Ball" – Bruce Springsteen & the E Street Band
3. "Another Brick in the Atlantic Wall Part I, II & III" – Roger Waters
4. "Us and Them" – Roger Waters
5. "Comfortably Numb" – Roger Waters and Eddie Vedder
6. "Hallelujah (Sandy Relief Version)" – Adam Sandler
7. "It's My Life" – Bon Jovi
8. "Wanted Dead Or Alive" – Bon Jovi
9. "Got to Get Better in a Little While" – Eric Clapton
10. "Crossroads"– Eric Clapton
11. "You Got Me Rocking" – Rolling Stones
12. "Jumpin' Jack Flash" – Rolling Stones

=== Disc two ===
1. "No One"– Alicia Keys
2. "Who Are You" – The Who
3. "Baba O'Riley" – The Who
4. "Love, Reign O'er Me" – The Who
5. "Miami 2017 (Seen the Lights Go Out on Broadway)" – Billy Joel
6. "Movin' Out (Anthony's Song)" – Billy Joel
7. "You May Be Right" – Billy Joel
8. "Viva La Vida" – Chris Martin
9. "Losing My Religion" – Chris Martin and Michael Stipe
10. "Us Against the World" – Chris Martin
11. "Helter Skelter" – Paul McCartney
12. "Empire State of Mind" – Alicia Keys

== Chart positions ==
=== Weekly charts ===
Chart (2013)	Peak position
Belgian Albums (Ultratop Flanders)	46
Belgian Albums (Ultratop Wallonia)	31
Dutch Albums (Album Top 100)	60
Swiss Albums (Schweizer Hitparade)	83
US Billboard 200	9
US Top Digital Albums (Billboard)	1
US Top Rock Albums (Billboard)	3

=== Year-end charts ===
Chart (2013)	Position
US Billboard 200	178
US Top Rock Albums (Billboard)	48
