= Live in San Diego (Eric Clapton album) =

Live album by Eric Clapton
- Released: 30 September 2016 (CD) 10 March 2017 (DVD)
- Recorded: 15 March 2007
- Venue: iPayOne Center, San Diego, California
- Length: 107:43 (standard edition) 2 hours (DVD)
- Label: Reprise (Warner Music Group)
- Producer: Simon Climie; Eric Clapton

Eric Clapton chronology
| I Still Do (2016) | Live in San Diego (2016) | Happy Xmas (2018) |

J. J. Cale chronology
| Roll On (2009) | Stay Around (2019) |

Live in San Diego (alternatively known as Live in San Diego with special guest JJ Cale) is the thirteenth live album (and a live DVD) by British rock musician Eric Clapton. It was released through Reprise Records as a live album on 30 September 2016 and as a 2-hour live DVD on 10 March 2017.

== Overview ==
Special guests on the Live in San Diego release include guitarists J. J. Cale, Robert Cray, Doyle Bramhall II and Derek Trucks. The live album marks Clapton's second collaboration with Cale after The Road to Escondido was released on 7 November 2006. Also, the album features the first new live music from Clapton and Cray following Clapton's 1991 live double album 24 Nights. The album, which is available on compact disc, on gramophone record and as a digital download, was recorded on 15 March 2007 at the Ipayone Center in San Diego during the "Doyle & Derek World Tour" and features a total of 16 tracks.

== About the concert ==
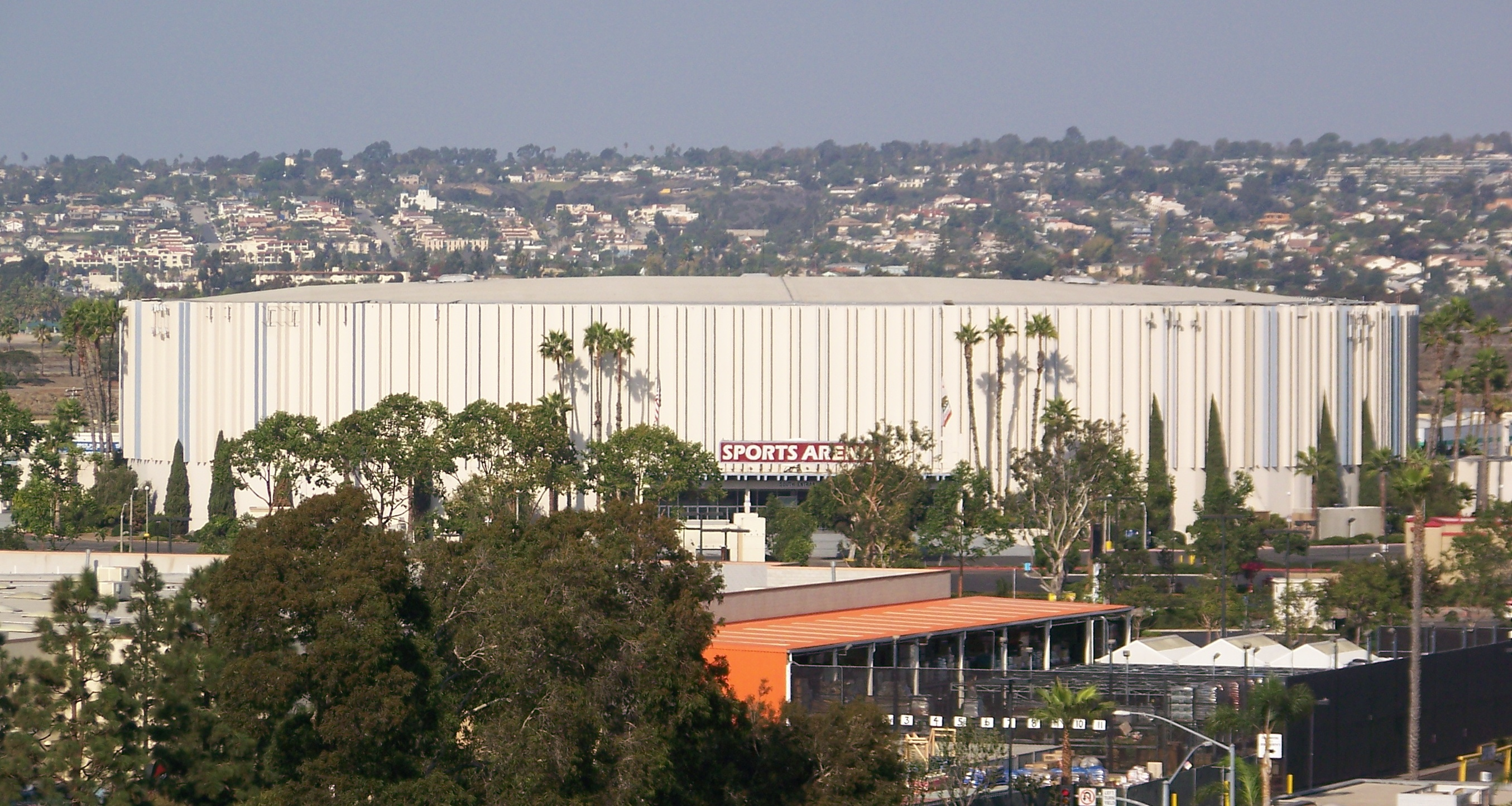
The concert was recorded on 15 March 2007 at the Ipayone Center.

The concert took place during the two-year long "Doyle & Derek World Tour" Clapton held together with Doyle Bramhall II and Derek Trucks from 2006 to 2007 leading up to the Crossroads Guitar Festival 2007 at Chicago's Toyota Park. Both audio and video filming for the release began on 15 March 2007 during the concert at the Ipayone Center in San Diego, California. Before performing with Cale at the venue, Clapton said: "This is the realization of what may have been my last ambition: to work with the man whose music has inspired me for as long as I can remember."

Critic George Varga from the San Diego Union Tribune reviewed: "Thursday's show was the sole date to feature a cameo by Cale, who has long been one of Clapton's idols. Sitting side-by-side with Derek Trucks and Doyle Bramhall, Clapton and Cale amiably sang and played together on such Cale-penned gems as "After Midnight," "Cocaine," and the more recent “Don't Cry Sister” and “Who Am I Telling You?" Clearly delighted, Clapton beamed and grinned throughout Cale's five-song guest spot."

The sell-out concert with 10,911 people in attendance grossed $837,570.

Rhythm guitarist Doyle Bramhall II told the online magazine The Wall Street Journal that "[we] were in the middle of a tour when Eric brought J. J. on for the show in San Diego, so it felt like we were a well-oiled band ready to support; Eric and J. J. could just let go and not think about anything other than the magic they were creating." When Bramhall II was asked about the performance, he described it as a "slide-guitar orchestra" and added: "It was a very high energy song and I remember feeling like we were holding on to it like a ride."

== Release ==
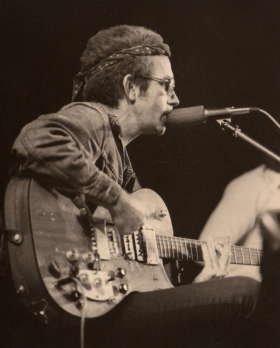
The album features Clapton's long-time friend J.J. Cale who died in 2013.

The album was announced on 5 August 2016. The album is available on compact disc (as a two-disc CD), as a 180 gram gramophone record (as a three-disc vinyl) as well as a digital album.

Clapton previously honoured Cale in 2006 with the release of the Platinum-selling collaborative studio album The Road to Escondido and in 2014 as "Eric Clapton and Friends" (with musicians like Tom Petty, Mark Knopfler, Willie Nelson, John Mayer and others) with the release of The Breeze: An Appreciation of JJ Cale, a tribute album to Cale after his death in 2013, another release which gained positive critical acclaim around the world and success on international album charts. The first single from the album entitled "They Call Me the Breeze", released on 30 June 2014 featured footage of the concert for the official music video.

On 25 August 2016 a performance of "Motherless Children" was released as a video single on YouTube and as an audio single on Spotify. On 23 September 2016 another video, "Tell the Truth", was released. The video of "Wonderful Tonight" from the concert was released through Clapton's official YouTube channel on 10 October 2016.

A 2-hour (limited edition) live DVD version was released on 10 March 2017 (on the occasion of the 10th anniversary of the concert).

== Critical reception ==
Professional ratings
Review scores
| Source | Rating |
|---|---|
| AllMusic | 3.5/5 stars |
| American Songwriter | 4.5/5 stars |
| JamBase | 5/5 stars |
| Noise11 | (favourable) |

Music critic Stephen Thomas Erlewine from the website AllMusic notes that "this brief mid-concert set perhaps illustrates the love and affection between the two men". Furthermore, Erlewine remarks the on-stage relationship between Clapton and Cale, saying "the chemistry is there along with a palpable affection between the two musicians, with Clapton following Cale's lazy lead. It provides a nice contrast to the heavy blues that dominates the rest of the album." Clapton's collaborations throughout the show-night were also positively rated by the critic, who finished his September 2016 review by calling Clapton's performance devoted most "of his set list to the guitar, which helps offset the easy-rolling grooves of the Cale showcase. Combined, it amounts to one of his most satisfying live albums." The website rated the album as one of the best albums of 2016. The music online database JamBase awarded the release five out of five possible stars, rating the album "excellent". Critic Andy Kahn called the release a "classic". Paul Cashmere from Noise 11 reviewed the album positively.

Journalist Hal Horowitz from the American Songwriter said in his review that the release date seems to be a decade too late, but does not seem to "diminish" the "excellence" of the recording. Further, the critic explained that "this tour found guitarists Derek Trucks and Doyle Bramhall ll backing Clapton and, more importantly, pushing him out of his comfort zone. But it's the material, six tracks resurrected from Layla and Other Assorted Love Songs with Trucks substituting for Duane Allman, that puts this over the top." Horowitz also recalled Cale's performance on the album positively and summed up that "since this is a single show, there is an ebb and flow that's palpable. Between that, the remarkably intense and fluid playing by Clapton with one of his finest bands, and stimulating song choices, this now becomes one of Clapton's best live recordings in a catalog already stuffed with plenty of terrific choices."

== Track listing ==
| No. | Title | Writer(s) | Length |
|---|---|---|---|
| 1. | "Tell the Truth" | Eric Clapton · Bobby Whitlock | 6:23 |
| 2. | "Key to the Highway" | Charlie Segar | 4:12 |
| 3. | "Got to Get Better in a Little While" | Eric Clapton | 9:35 |
| 4. | "Little Wing" | Jimi Hendrix | 6:58 |
| 5. | "Anyday" | Eric Clapton · Bobby Whitlock | 6:05 |
| 6. | "Anyway the Wind Blows" (with J. J. Cale) | J. J. Cale | 5:32 |
| 7. | "After Midnight" (with J. J. Cale) | J. J. Cale | 5:44 |
| 8. | "Who Am I Telling You?" (with J. J. Cale) | J. J. Cale | 4:52 |
| 9. | "Don't Cry Sister" (with J. J. Cale) | J. J. Cale | 3:33 |
| 10. | "Cocaine" (with J. J. Cale) | J. J. Cale | 5:31 |
| 11. | "Motherless Children" | Blind Willie Johnson | 5:23 |
| 12. | "Little Queen of Spades" | Robert Johnson | 17:21 |
| 13. | "Further on up the Road" | Don Robey · Joe Medwick Veasey | 6:49 |
| 14. | "Wonderful Tonight" | Eric Clapton | 4:31 |
| 15. | "Layla" | Eric Clapton · Jim Gordon | 8:25 |
| 16. | "Crossroads" (with Robert Cray) | Robert Johnson | 6:55 |
| Total length: | | | 107:43 |

Live in San Diego – Beano bonus track
| No. | Title | Length |
|---|---|---|
| 1. | "Introduction" | 1:12 |
| Total length: | | 108:55 |

== Personnel ==
Taken from the press release.

- Eric Clapton – guitar · lead vocals · producer
- J. J. Cale – guitar · vocals (tracks 6, 7, 8, 9, 10)
- Robert Cray – guitar · vocals (track 16)
- Doyle Bramhall II – guitar · backing vocals
- Derek Trucks – slide guitar
- Willie Weeks – bass guitar
- Steve Jordan – drums
- Chris Stainton – keyboards
- Tim Carmon – keyboards
- Michelle John – backing vocals
- Sharon White – backing vocals
- Simon Climie – producer · audio mixing
- Alan Douglas – record engineer

== Charts ==
| Chart (2016) | Peak position |
|---|---|
| Australian Albums (ARIA) | 61 |
| Austrian Albums (Ö3 Austria) | 23 |
| Belgian Albums (Ultratop Flanders) | 25 |
| Belgian Albums (Ultratop Wallonia) | 28 |
| Croatian International Albums (HDU) | 10 |
| Czech Albums (ČNS IFPI) | 48 |
| Dutch Albums (Album Top 100) | 36 |
| French Albums (SNEP) | 87 |
| German Albums (Offizielle Top 100) | 20 |
| Hungarian Albums (MAHASZ) | 34 |
| Italian Albums (FIMI) | 17 |
| New Zealand Heatseekers Albums (RMNZ) | 9 |
| Scottish Albums (OCC) | 37 |
| Spanish Albums (PROMUSICAE) | 21 |
| Swiss Albums (Schweizer Hitparade) | 9 |
| Taiwanese Albums (Five Music) | 19 |
| UK Albums (OCC) | 60 |
| US Billboard 200 | 47 |
| US Top Album Sales (Billboard) | 21 |
| US Top Rock Albums (Billboard) | 13 |
| US Indie Store Album Sales (Billboard) | 13 |
