= Behind the Sun (Eric Clapton album) =

Studio album by Eric Clapton
- Released: 11 March 1985
- Recorded: 1984
- Studios: AIR (Montserrat); Lion Share (Los Angeles); Amigo (North Hollywood); Old Croft (Shalford, Surrey)
- Genres: Rock, hard rock
- Length: 50:17
- Label: Duck / Warner Bros.
- Producers: Eric Clapton, Phil Collins, Ted Templeman, Lenny Waronker

Eric Clapton chronology
Backtrackin' (1984)	Behind the Sun (1985)	Edge of Darkness (1985)

Singles from Behind the Sun
- 1. "Forever Man" Released: 22 February 1985; 2. "See What Love Can Do" Released: June 1985 (US); 3. "She's Waiting" Released: 15 July 1985 (UK)

Professional ratings
Review scores
Source	Rating
AllMusic	3/5 stars

Behind the Sun is the ninth solo studio album by Eric Clapton, released on 11 March 1985 by Duck Records / Warner Bros. Records. It is Clapton's first collaborative project with Phil Collins who co-produced the album and played on some of the tracks. While recording the album Clapton temporarily split with his wife.

== Background and recording ==
After nearly a decade of Clapton's guitar playing taking a backseat to his singing/songwriting, this album contains several guitar solos. The album includes synthesizers and drum machines played by Phil Collins, Ted Templeman, Peter Robinson, Michael Omartian, James Newton Howard, Chris Stainton and Greg Phillinganes, as well as Clapton's Roland guitar synthesizer on "Never Make You Cry". Bassists Donald "Duck" Dunn from Booker T. & the MG's and Nathan East (later of the smooth jazz quartet Fourplay) also played on the album.

Between March and April 1984, recording for Behind The Sun took place at AIR Studios on Montserrat with Collins as co-producer. In his autobiography, Clapton remembers the 1984 session pleasantly: "The whole thing is going so great, I hope it never stops." However, his troubled marriage with Pattie Boyd became the subject matter for most of his original material: "She's Waiting", "Same Old Blues" and "Just Like a Prisoner" all contain extended guitar solos from Clapton. It was during this period that Boyd left him and "it was eventually decided that we should have a trial separation". Clapton assuaged his pain by writing the song "Behind the Sun", featuring only his guitar and vocals along with Phil Collins' synthesizer, as the final song on the album.

This was Clapton's first collaboration with songwriter Jerry Lynn Williams. Warner Brothers looked critically at this follow-up to the Money and Cigarettes album, Clapton's first for the label, which did not sell well. The Collins-produced Behind the Sun first submitted in the fall of 1984 was rejected by the label, insisting that he record several new songs written by Williams, backed by Los Angeles session players. The label put the project under the auspices of veteran company producers Lenny Waronker and Ted Templeman. Warner Brothers then emphasised the new tracks, releasing two of them, "Forever Man" (which reached the Top 40) and "See What Love Can Do," as singles. Clapton agreed to their terms, but asked them to provide some "hits" and record the songs with their own producer and musicians: "They sent me three songs by a Texas songwriter – "Forever Man", "Something's Happening" and "See What Love Can Do" – and they were good." The sessions featured Toto guitarist Steve Lukather and then-drummer Jeff Porcaro, as well as Clapton's long-time collaborators, drummer Jamie Oldaker, bassist Nathan East and keyboardist Greg Phillinganes.

== Promotion ==
The Behind the Sun tour was featured at the first Live Aid concert in 1985 where "She's Waiting" was performed along with "White Room" and "Layla". The video for "Forever Man" became an MTV favorite, featuring an accident where one of the cameras falls off the dolly. "Same Old Blues" was resurrected for the 25th Anniversary world tour and the Montserrat charity show in 1988 and 1997, with Mark Knopfler on rhythm guitar; Clapton resurrected "She's Waiting" for his 1992 world tour. Clapton came to sit in with Paul Shaffer to promote the album on Late Night with David Letterman in 1985. Letterman was impressed by the songs on the album joking to Clapton if it would be alright for him if Letterman would sing "Forever Man".

Both "Knock On Wood" and "She's Waiting" were featured on episodes of Miami Vice, albeit over three years apart. "Knock On Wood" was heard in the party scene of Season 2's 'Phil The Shill' (December 1985), which guest-starred the song's producer Phil Collins, while "She's Waiting" played in a search scene of Season 5's 'The Lost Madonna' (March 1989).

== Reception ==
Deborah Frost, in a contemporary review for Rolling Stone, felt the album was "slick but inconsistent", and was concerned that Clapton's move into commercial ballads would eventually see him turn his back on his rock fans, instead playing his greatest hits on the Vegas circuit. Robert Christgau in his Village Voice Consumer Guide described the album as "[s]ad [a]nd also bad" because Clapton was simply following commercial market fashion.

In a retrospective summary for AllMusic, William Ruhlmann feels that the album is "somewhat schizophrenic" due to the tinkering of the record label, who were concerned that the original version of the album contained no hits and was too downbeat, so brought in new writers and producers. Ruhlman concludes that despite some effective guitar work the album is competent rather than exciting, and is not among Clapton's best.

Cash Box said that the second single "See What Love Can Do" "plays off a reggae/gospel theme and provides an excellent showcase for some tasteful guitar playing." Cash Box also praised its "tight background vocals and rhythm section." Billboard said of that song that it has "moody groundwells of texture in a many-layered rock ballad."

== Track listing ==
No.	Title	Writer(s)	Length
1.	"She's Waiting"	Eric Clapton, Peter Robinson	4:55
2.	"See What Love Can Do"	Jerry Lynn Williams	3:58
3.	"Same Old Blues"	Clapton	8:15
4.	"Knock on Wood"	Eddie Floyd, Steve Cropper	3:19
5.	"Something's Happening"	Williams	3:23
6.	"Forever Man"	Williams	3:13
7.	"It All Depends"	Clapton	5:05
8.	"Tangled in Love"	Marcy Levy, Richard Feldman	4:11
9.	"Never Make You Cry"	Clapton, Phil Collins	6:06
10.	"Just Like a Prisoner"	Clapton	5:29
11.	"Behind the Sun"	Clapton	2:13

Some tracks were recorded for the album, but not included.

1. "Loving Your Lovin'" (Jerry Williams) Produced by Templeman/Waronker – Released on the Wayne's World movie soundtrack
2. "Heaven Is One Step Away" (Eric Clapton) Produced by Phil Collins – Released on the Back to the Future movie soundtrack and later on Crossroads Box Set
3. "Too Bad" (Eric Clapton) Produced by Phil Collins – Released as the B-side to "Forever Man" and then later on the Crossroads Box Set
4. "Jailbait" (Eric Clapton) Produced by Phil Collins – Released as B-Side of "She's Waiting" Single
5. "You Don't Know Like I Know" (Isaac Hayes, David Porter) Produced by Phil Collins – Released in Australia only
6. "One Jump Ahead of the Storm" – Unissued

== Personnel ==
- Eric Clapton – lead vocals, backing vocals (6), guitar, guitar synthesizer (9)
- Steve Lukather – rhythm guitar (2, 6)
- Lindsey Buckingham – rhythm guitar (5)
- Donald Dunn – bass guitar (1, 3, 4, 7–10)
- Nathan East – bass guitar (2, 5, 6), backing vocals (5)
- J. Peter Robinson – keyboards (1, 3, 4, 7–10)
- Chris Stainton – keyboards (1, 3, 4, 7, 8, 10), Hammond organ (1, 8), acoustic piano (4), Fender Rhodes (9)
- Michael Omartian – keyboards (2, 6)
- James Newton Howard – keyboards (5)
- Greg Phillinganes – keyboards (5), backing vocals (5)
- Phil Collins – electronic drums (1, 3), right side drums (10), snare drum (1), backing vocals (4, 9), shaker (7, 9), synthesizer (11)
- Jamie Oldaker – drums (1, 3, 4, 7–9), backing vocals (9), "left" drums (10)
- Jeff Porcaro – drums (2, 6)
- John Robinson – drums (5)
- Ray Cooper – percussion (1, 8), gong (3), bongos (7)
- Lenny Castro – congas (2, 6)
- Ted Templeman – shaker (5), tambourine (5), timbales (6)
- Marcy Levy – backing vocals (1–3, 6–9)
- Shaun Murphy – backing vocals (1, 3, 7, 8)
- Jerry Lynn Williams – backing vocals (2, 5)

== Production ==
- Producers – Phil Collins (tracks 1, 3, 4 & 7–11); Lenny Waronker and Ted Templeman (tracks 2, 5 & 6).
- Engineers – Nick Launay (tracks 1, 3, 4 & 7–11); Lee Herschberg (tracks 2, 5 & 6).
- Assistant Engineer (tracks 1, 3, 4 & 7–11) – Steve Jackson
- Mixing – Nick Launay (tracks 1, 3, 4 & 7–11); Mark Linett (tracks 2, 5 & 6).
- Mix Assistant – Steve "Barney" Chase (tracks 1, 3, 4 & 7–11)
- Tracks 1, 3, 4 & 7–11 recorded at AIR Studios (Montserrat, West Indies); Mixed at Townhouse Studios (London, England).
- Tracks 2, 5 & 6 recorded at Lion Share Recording Studio (Los Angeles, CA) and Amigo Studios (North Hollywood, CA); Mixed at Amigo Studios.
- Mastered at Townhouse Studios (London) and Sheffield Lab Matrix (Santa Monica, CA).
- Production Coordination (tracks 2, 5 & 6) – Joan Parker
- Art Direction, Design and Painting – Larry Vigon
- Photography – Patti Clapton

== Charts ==
=== Weekly charts ===
Chart (1985)	Peak position
Australian Albums (Kent Music Report)	50
Austrian Albums (Ö3 Austria)	30
Canada Top Albums/CDs (RPM)	20
Dutch Albums (Album Top 100)	5
Finnish Albums (Suomen virallinen lista)	17
German Albums (Offizielle Top 100)	15
Japanese Albums (Oricon)	14
New Zealand Albums (RMNZ)	21
Norwegian Albums (VG-lista)	5
Swedish Albums (Sverigetopplistan)	10
Swiss Albums (Schweizer Hitparade)	3
UK Albums (Official Charts)	8
US Billboard 200	34

=== Year-end charts ===
Chart (1985)	Position
Dutch Albums (Album Top 100)	58
Swiss Albums (Schweizer Hitparade)	26

== Certifications ==
Region	Certification	Certified units/sales
Australia (ARIA)	Gold	35,000^{^}
Norway (IFPI Norway)	Silver	25,000
Switzerland (IFPI Switzerland)	Gold	25,000^{^}
United States (RIAA)	Platinum	1,000,000^{^}
^{^} Shipments figures based on certification alone.
