= Easy Now (song) =

Single by Eric Clapton

from the album Eric Clapton
- A-side: "After Midnight" · "Let It Rain"
- Released: 1970
- Genre: Pop rock · Acoustic rock
- Length: 2:58
- Label: Polydor
- Songwriter(s): Eric Clapton
- Producer(s): Delaney Bramlett

"Easy Now" is a pop rock song, written by the British rock musician Eric Clapton. He wrote and recorded the track for his 1970 studio album Eric Clapton for Polydor Records. The song was also released as the B-side to the singles "After Midnight" in 1970 and "Let It Rain" in 1972. The composition is also featured on the 1972 compilation album Eric Clapton at His Best. The recording was produced by Delaney Bramlett.

== Information ==
The song is played by Clapton on a steel-string acoustic guitar. The song is written in the key of F-sharp major. Music historian Marc Roberty describes it as "a very underrated love song" that he finds "far more sincere" than Clapton's more famous love song "Wonderful Tonight." Music critic Scott Floman calls the song "comparatively overlooked" and notes, "[the] simple yet effective ballad featuring Eric's ever-improving singing alongside a lone acoustic guitar, is one of this underrated album’s most underrated efforts". Guitar World contributor Damian Fanelli rated "Easy Now" as "one of the finest songs Clapton has ever written" and stated that it doesn't sound dated like some other songs on the album due to "its stripped-down arrangement." Rory O'Connor of the Tampa Tribune felt that the song's style had been influenced by George Harrison, finding it to be "soft" and "melodic," with "unorthodox chord changes." O'Connor rated the song to be "a gem."

Together with the A-side "After Midnight", the song reached various national single charts, including in Australia (#51), Canada (#10), Japan (#87), the Netherlands (#19), New Zealand (#17) and the United States (#18). Along with "Let It Rain", the track reached the single charts in Australia (#99), Canada (#42) and the United States (#48).
