= Got to Get Better in a Little While =

Single by Derek and the Dominos

from the album Layla and Other Assorted Love Songs – 40th Anniversary Edition
- B-side: "Layla"
- Released: 21 March 2011
- Genre: Rock
- Length: 6:05
- Label: Polydor
- Songwriter: Eric Clapton
- Producer: Tom Dowd

"Got to Get Better in a Little While" is a rock song written by the British rock guitarist and singer Eric Clapton while the lead member of Derek and the Dominos. The song was originally recorded in the studio for the planned release of a second Derek and the Dominos album. Instead, the song first appeared in a live version on the 1973 live album In Concert. The song was released on Clapton's solo 1988 compilation Crossroads and later appeared on the band's album Live at the Fillmore in 1994.

The 40th Anniversary Super Deluxe Edition release of the 1970 studio album by Derek and the Dominos, included the original take with newly-recorded organ and vocals by Bobby Whitlock and a second "jam version". The song, with "Layla" as the B-side was released as 7-inch single on 21 March 2011.

On 12 December 2012 Clapton performed the song as part of his three-song setlist at the 12-12-12: The Concert for Sandy Relief along with "Nobody Knows You When You're Down and Out" and "Crossroads". His live version was also included on the eponymous album released on 5 January 2013. Clapton's take on the song was considered a "stand-out performance" from the album and was therefore released as the first single from the album on 18 December 2012 as a music download.

In 2013, Clapton recorded yet another live version of the song for his Crossroads Guitar Festival. The take on the tune was released as a video single on 21 October 2013 through Clapton's official YouTube channel to promote the compact disc, DVD, Blu-ray and vinyl release of the festival. The magazine Guitar World called the release a "souvenir of Eric Clapton's latest star-studded charity concert, which took place in April at Madison Square Garden" and praised Clapton's live take.

In 2016, Clapton released the song as part of his live album Live in San Diego. Guitarist Rich Robinson covered the song and released his version of "Got to Get Better in a Little While" on the eponymous ten-inch vinyl single along with the originals "Look Through My Window" and "Falling Away" on 16 April 2016 through Eagle Records.
