= Crossroads (Eric Clapton album) =

Box set by Eric Clapton
- Released: 18 April 1988
- Recorded: 1963–1987
- Genre: Blues rock
- Length: 293:03
- Label: Polydor
- Compiler: Bill Levenson

Eric Clapton chronology
The Cream of Eric Clapton (1987)	Crossroads (1988)	Journeyman (1989)

Crossroads is a 1988 music collection box set of the work of Eric Clapton released by Polydor Records. The set includes his work with the Yardbirds, John Mayall & the Bluesbreakers, Cream, Blind Faith, Delaney & Bonnie & Friends and Derek and the Dominos, as well as his solo career.

Several live or alternative studio recordings were previously unreleased. Anthony DeCurtis contributed the liner notes to the album, and The Rolling Stones guitarist Ronnie Wood painted the album's cover. Mitchell Kanner designed the package and, along with Michael Bays, art directed the package. Crossroads was mastered by Greg Calbi and compiled by Bill Levenson. The four-disc box set sold more than four million copies worldwide and was presented with six awards, including two Grammy Awards awarded in 1989. With high commercial success and positive critical response, this is Clapton's most-purchased box set to date.

== Critical reception ==
Professional ratings
Review scores
Source	Rating
Rolling Stone	5/5 stars
AllMusic	5/5 stars

The critics for Billboard magazine noted mostly the production work, besides the compilations track listing stating: "Compiler Levenson has unearthed some superb rarities for the set, and Anthony DeCurtis contributes intelligent annotation. Classy package and bounty of unheard material will attract Slowhand's legion of fans". Rolling Stone journalist David Fricke really liked the boxed set and awarded the release an extremely rare five-star rating in April 1988. In his review for the American music website AllMusic, critic Stephen Thomas Erlewine presented the album with five out of five possible stars, rating the release as an AllMusic top album and notes:

[...] Clapton's set was a bona fide blockbuster. And it's easy to see why. Crossroads manages to sum up Clapton's career succinctly and thoroughly, touching upon all of his hits and adding a bevy of first-rate unreleased material (most notably selections from the scrapped second Derek and the Dominos album). Although not all of his greatest performances are included on the set – none of his work as a session musician or guest artist is included, for instance – every truly essential item he recorded is present on these four discs. No other Clapton album accurately explains why the guitarist was so influential, or demonstrates exactly what he accomplished.

— Stephen Thomas Erlewine, AllMusic

== Awards ==
Year	Ceremony	Award	Result	Ref.
1988	Billboard	First Double Platinum-selling Box Set	Won	
1988	Billboard	First Platinum-selling Box Set	Won	
1988	Billboard	Highest-charting Boxed Set	Won	
1989	Grammy Awards	Best Album Notes	Won	
1989	Grammy Awards	Best Historical Album	Won	

== Track listings ==
=== CD release ===
Disc 1
No.	Title	Writer(s)	Length
1.	"Boom Boom" (with The Yardbirds)	John Lee Hooker	2:25
2.	"Honey in Your Hips" (with The Yardbirds)	Keith Relf	2:18
3.	"Baby What's Wrong" (with The Yardbirds)	Jimmy Reed	2:40
4.	"I Wish You Would" (with The Yardbirds)	Billy Boy Arnold	2:19
5.	"A Certain Girl" (with The Yardbirds)	Naomi Neville	2:17
6.	"Good Morning Little Schoolgirl" (with The Yardbirds)	H.G. Demarais	2:45
7.	"I Ain't Got You" (with The Yardbirds)	Calvin Carter	1:59
8.	"For Your Love" (with The Yardbirds)	Graham Gouldman	2:29
9.	"Got to Hurry" (with The Yardbirds)	Oscar Rasputin	2:35
10.	"Lonely Years" (with John Mayall & the Bluesbreakers)	John Mayall	3:17
11.	"Bernard Jenkins" (with John Mayall & the Bluesbreakers)	Eric Clapton	3:47
12.	"Hideaway" (with John Mayall & the Bluesbreakers)	Freddie King; Sonny Thompson	3:14
13.	"All Your Love" (with John Mayall & the Bluesbreakers)	Willie Dixon; Otis Rush	3:34
14.	"Ramblin' On My Mind" (with John Mayall & the Bluesbreakers)	Robert Johnson	3:07
15.	"Have You Ever Loved a Woman" (live) (with John Mayall & the Bluesbreakers)	Billy Myles	6:41
16.	"Wrapping Paper" (with Cream)	Jack Bruce; Pete Brown	2:21
17.	"I Feel Free" (with Cream)	Bruce; Brown	2:52
18.	"Spoonful" (with Cream)	Dixon	6:30
19.	"Lawdy Mama" (live at the BBC) (with Cream)	Traditional	1:50
20.	"Strange Brew" (with Cream)	Clapton; Felix Pappalardi; Gail Collins Pappalardi	2:46
21.	"Sunshine of Your Love" (with Cream)	Clapton; Bruce; Brown	4:10
22.	"Tales of Brave Ulysses" (with Cream)	Clapton; Martin Sharp	2:46
23.	"Steppin' Out" (live at the BBC) (with Cream)	James Bracken	3:31
Total length:			72:13

Disc 2
No.	Title	Writer(s)	Length
1.	"Anyone for Tennis" (with Cream)	Clapton; Sharp	2:37
2.	"White Room" (with Cream)	Bruce; Brown	4:56
3.	"Crossroads" (live) (with Cream)	Johnson	4:14
4.	"Badge" (with Cream)	Clapton; George Harrison	2:43
5.	"Presence of the Lord" (with Blind Faith)	Clapton	4:48
6.	"Can't Find My Way Home" (with Blind Faith)	Steve Winwood	3:15
7.	"Sleeping in the Ground" (with Blind Faith)	Sam Myers	2:50
8.	"Comin' Home" (with Delaney & Bonnie & Friends)	Clapton; Bonnie Bramlett	3:13
9.	"Blues Power"	Clapton; Leon Russell	3:06
10.	"After Midnight"	J.J. Cale	3:17
11.	"Let It Rain"	Clapton; Bramlett	5:01
12.	"Tell the Truth" (with Derek and the Dominos)	Clapton; Bobby Whitlock	3:23
13.	"Roll It Over" (with Derek and the Dominos)	Clapton; Whitlock	4:29
14.	"Layla" (with Derek and the Dominos)	Clapton; Jim Gordon	7:07
15.	"Mean Old World" (with Duane Allman)	Walter Jacobs	3:50
16.	"Key to the Highway" (live) (with Derek and the Dominos)	Big Bill Broonzy; Charlie Segar	6:27
17.	"Crossroads" (live) (with Derek and the Dominos)	Johnson	8:17
Total length:			73:33

Disc 3
No.	Title	Writer(s)	Length
1.	"Got to Get Better in a Little While" (with Derek and the Dominos)	Clapton	5:31
2.	"Evil" (with Derek and the Dominos)	Dixon	4:25
3.	"One More Chance" (with Derek and the Dominos)	Clapton	3:17
4.	"Mean Old Frisco" (with Derek and the Dominos)	Arthur Crudup	4:02
5.	"Snake Lake Blues" (with Derek and the Dominos)	Clapton; Whitlock	3:33
6.	"Let It Grow"	Clapton	4:56
7.	"Ain't That Lovin' You"	Jimmy Reed	5:26
8.	"Motherless Children"	Traditional	4:51
9.	"I Shot the Sheriff" (live)	Bob Marley	7:48
10.	"Better Make It Through Today"	Clapton	4:05
11.	"The Sky Is Crying"	Elmore James	3:57
12.	"I Found a Love"	Leon Russell	3:38
13.	"(When Things Go Wrong) It Hurts Me Too"	Mel London	5:34
14.	"Whatcha Gonna Do"	Peter Tosh	3:01
15.	"Knockin' on Heaven's Door"	Bob Dylan	4:21
16.	"Someone Like You"	Arthur Louis	4:30
Total length:			72:55

Disc 4
No.	Title	Writer(s)	Length
1.	"Hello Old Friend"	Clapton	3:34
2.	"Sign Language" (featuring Bob Dylan)	Dylan	2:56
3.	"Further on Up the Road" (live)	Joe Medwich Veasey; Don D. Robey	6:18
4.	"Lay Down Sally"	Clapton; Marcy Levy; George Terry	3:50
5.	"Wonderful Tonight"	Clapton	3:42
6.	"Cocaine"	Cale	3:35
7.	"Promises"	Richard Feldman; Roger Linn	3:00
8.	"If I Don't Be There by Morning"	Dylan; Helen Springs	4:34
9.	"Double Trouble" (live)	Rush	8:01
10.	"I Can't Stand It"	Clapton	4:09
11.	"The Shape You're In"	Clapton	4:09
12.	"Heaven Is One Step Away"	Clapton	4:09
13.	"She's Waiting"	Clapton; Peter Robinson	4:55
14.	"Too Bad"	Clapton	2:37
15.	"Miss You"	Clapton; Greg Phillinganes; Bobby Columby	5:05
16.	"Wanna Make Love to You"	Jerry Lynn Williams	5:43
17.	"After Midnight"	Cale	4:05
Total length:			74:22

=== Vinyl release ===
Record one – Side one
No.	Title	Writer(s)	Length
1.	"Boom Boom" (with The Yardbirds)	John Lee Hooker	2:25
2.	"Honey in Your Hips" (with The Yardbirds)	Keith Relf	2:18
3.	"Baby What's Wrong" (with The Yardbirds)	Jimmy Reed	2:40
4.	"I Wish You Would" (with The Yardbirds)	Billy Boy Arnold	2:19
5.	"A Certain Girl" (with The Yardbirds)	Naomi Neville	2:17
6.	"Good Morning Little Schoolgirl" (with The Yardbirds)	H.G. Demarais	2:45
7.	"I Ain't Got You" (with The Yardbirds)	Calvin Carter	1:59
8.	"For Your Love" (with The Yardbirds)	Graham Gouldman	2:29
9.	"Got to Hurry" (with The Yardbirds)	Oscar Rasputin	2:35

Record one – Side two
No.	Title	Writer(s)	Length
1.	"Lonely Years" (with John Mayall & the Bluesbreakers)	John Mayall	3:17
2.	"Bernard Jenkins" (with John Mayall & the Bluesbreakers)	Eric Clapton	3:47
3.	"Hideaway" (with John Mayall & the Bluesbreakers)	Freddie King · Sonny Thompson	3:14
4.	"All Your Love" (with John Mayall & the Bluesbreakers)	Willie Dixon · Otis Rush	3:34
5.	"Ramblin' On My Mind" (with John Mayall & the Bluesbreakers)	Robert Johnson	3:07
6.	"Have You Ever Loved a Woman" (live) (with John Mayall & the Bluesbreakers)	Billy Myles	6:41

Record two – Side one
No.	Title	Writer(s)	Length
1.	"Wrapping Paper" (with Cream)	Jack Bruce · Pete Brown	2:21
2.	"I Feel Free" (with Cream)	Jack Bruce · Pete Brown	2:52
3.	"Spoonful" (with Cream)	Willie Dixon	6:30
4.	"Lawdy Mama" (live at the BBC) (with Cream)	Traditional	1:50
5.	"Strange Brew" (with Cream)	Eric Clapton · Felix Pappalardi · Gail Collins Pappalardi	2:46
6.	"Sunshine of Your Love" (with Cream)	Eric Clapton · Jack Bruce · Pete Brown	4:10
7.	"Tales of Brave Ulysses" (with Cream)	Eric Clapton · Martin Sharp	2:46
8.	"Steppin' Out" (live at the BBC) (with Cream)	Bracken	3:31

Record two – Side two
No.	Title	Writer(s)	Length
1.	"Anyone for Tennis" (with Cream)	Eric Clapton · Martin Sharp	2:37
2.	"White Room" (with Cream)	Jack Bruce · Pete Brown	4:56
3.	"Crossroads" (live) (with Cream)	Robert Johnson	4:14
4.	"Badge" (with Cream)	Eric Clapton · George Harrison	2:43
5.	"Presence of the Lord" (with Blind Faith)	Eric Clapton	4:48
6.	"Can't Find My Way Home" (with Blind Faith)	Steve Winwood	3:15
7.	"Sleeping in the Ground" (with Blind Faith)	Sam Myers	2:50

Record three – Side one
No.	Title	Writer(s)	Length
1.	"Comin' Home" (with Delaney & Bonnie & Friends)	Eric Clapton · Bonnie Bramlett	3:13
2.	"Blues Power"	Eric Clapton · Leon Russell	3:06
3.	"After Midnight"	J.J. Cale	3:17
4.	"Let It Rain"	Eric Clapton · Bonnie Bramlett	5:01
5.	"Tell the Truth" (with Derek and the Dominos)	Eric Clapton · Bobby Whitlock	3:23
6.	"Roll It Over" (with Derek and the Dominos)	Eric Clapton · Bobby Whitlock	4:29

Record three – Side two
No.	Title	Writer(s)	Length
1.	"Layla" (with Derek and the Dominos)	Eric Clapton · Jim Gordon	7:07
2.	"Mean Old World" (with Derek and the Dominos)	Jacobs	3:50
3.	"Key to the Highway" (live) (with Derek and the Dominos)	Big Bill Broonzy · Charles Segar	6:27
4.	"Crossroads" (live) (with Derek and the Dominos)	Robert Johnson	8:17

Record four – Side one
No.	Title	Writer(s)	Length
1.	"Got to Get Better in a Little While" (with Derek and the Dominos)	Eric Clapton	5:31
2.	"Evil" (with Derek and the Dominos)	Willie Dixon	4:25
3.	"One More Chance" (with Derek and the Dominos)	Eric Clapton	3:17
4.	"Mean Old Frisco" (with Derek and the Dominos)	Arthur Crudup	4:02
5.	"Snake Lake Blues" (with Derek and the Dominos)	Eric Clapton · Bobby Whitlock	3:33

Record four – Side two
No.	Title	Writer(s)	Length
1.	"Let It Grow"	Eric Clapton	4:56
2.	"Ain't That Lovin' You"	Jimmy Reed	5:26
3.	"Motherless Children"	Traditional	4:51
4.	"I Shot the Sheriff" (live)	Bob Marley	7:48
5.	"Better Make It Through Today"	Eric Clapton	4:05

Record five – Side one
No.	Title	Writer(s)	Length
1.	"The Sky Is Crying"	Elmore James	3:57
2.	"I Found a Love"	Bridges	3:38
3.	"(When Things Go Wrong) It Hurts Me Too"	Mel London	5:34
4.	"Whatcha Gonna Do"	Peter Tosh	3:01
5.	"Knockin' on Heaven's Door"	Bob Dylan	4:21
6.	"Someone Like You"	Arthur Louis	4:30

Record five – Side two
No.	Title	Writer(s)	Length
1.	"Hello Old Friend"	Eric Clapton	3:34
2.	"Sign Language" (featuring Bob Dylan)	Bob Dylan	2:56
3.	"Further on Up the Road" (live)	Joe Medwich Veasey · Don D. Robey	6:18
4.	"Lay Down Sally"	Eric Clapton · Marcy Levy · George Terry	3:50
5.	"Wonderful Tonight"	Eric Clapton	3:42

Record six – Side one
No.	Title	Writer(s)	Length
1.	"Cocaine"	J.J. Cale	3:35
2.	"Promises"	Richard Feldman · Roger Linn	3:00
3.	"If I Don't Be There by Morning"	Bob Dylan · Helen Springs	4:34
4.	"Double Trouble" (live)	Rush	8:01
5.	"I Can't Stand It"	Eric Clapton	4:09
6.	"The Shape You're In"	Eric Clapton	4:09

Record six – Side two
No.	Title	Writer(s)	Length
1.	"Heaven Is One Step Away"	Eric Clapton	4:09
2.	"She's Waiting"	Eric Clapton · Peter Robinson	4:55
3.	"Too Bad"	Eric Clapton	2:37
4.	"Miss You"	Eric Clapton · Greg Phillinganes · Bobby Columby	5:05
5.	"Wanna Make Love to You"	Jerry Lynn Williams	5:43
6.	"After Midnight"	J.J. Cale	4:05

== Personnel ==
From Polydor's 1988 4-CD edition liner notes:

Disc one

- Keith Relf - vocals (1–8), harmonica (1–7)
- Eric Clapton - guitar, vocals (14, 16, 17, 19–22)
- Chris Dreja - guitar (1–9)
- Paul Samwell-Smith - bass (1–9)
- Jim McCarty - drums (1–9)
- Brian Auger - harpsichord (8)
- Denny Piercey - bongos (8)
- John Mayall - vocals (10, 13, 15), harmonica (10), piano (11, 14), organ (12, 13, 15)
- John McVie - bass (12–14)
- Hughie Flint - drums (12–15)
- Jack Bruce - bass (15–23), vocals (16–18, 20–22), piano (16, 17)
- Ginger Baker - drums (16–23), vocals (16, 17)

Disc two

- Eric Clapton - vocals (1, 3, 4, 9–17), guitar (1–7, 9–17), lead guitar (8)
- Jack Bruce - bass (1–4), vocals (2)
- Ginger Baker - drums (1–7), percussion (1), tympani (2)
- Felix Pappalardi - viola (1, 2), mellotron (1, 4), piano (4)
- George Harrison - guitar (4, 13), vocals (13)
- Steve Winwood - vocals (5–7), piano (5, 7), bass (5), guitar (6)
- Rick Grech - bass (6, 7)
- Delaney Bramlett - vocals (8–11), guitar (8–11)
- Bonnie Bramlett - vocals (8–11)
- Dave Mason - guitar (8, 13), vocals (13)
- Bobby Whitlock - keyboards (8, 9), organ (10, 11, 14), guitar (12), vocals (12–14), piano (13, 14, 16, 17)
- Carl Radle - bass (8–14, 16, 17)
- Jim Gordon - drums (8–14, 16, 17), piano (14)
- Jim Price - trumpet (8–11)
- Bobby Keys - sax (8–11)
- Tex Johnson - percussion (8)
- Rita Coolidge - vocals (8–11)
- Leon Russell - piano (9–11)
- Sonny Curtis - vocals (9–11)
- Jerry Allison - vocals (9–11)
- Stephen Stills - guitar (11), vocals (11)
- Duane Allman - guitar (14, 15)

Disc three

- Eric Clapton - vocals (1–4, 6–16), guitar, dobro (6)
- Carl Radle - bass
- Jim Gordon - drums (1–5)
- Bobby Whitlock - piano (2–5)
- George Terry - guitar (6, 8–16), vocals (6)
- Dick Sims - organ (6–11, 13–16), piano (12)
- Albhy Galuten - piano (6, 8), ARP synthesizer (6)
- Jamie Oldaker - drums (6–16)
- Yvonne Elliman - vocals (6, 7, 9, 13–16)
- Tom Bernfeld - vocals (6)
- Dave Mason - guitar (7)
- Marcy Levy - vocals (9, 14–16), tambourine (9)
- Peter Tosh - vocals (14), guitar (14)

Disc four

- Eric Clapton - vocals, guitar, dobro (2)
- George Terry - guitar (1–8)
- Jesse Ed Davis - guitar (1, 2)
- Dick Sims - keyboards (1–8)
- Carl Radle - bass (1–8)
- Jamie Oldaker - drums (1–8, 12, 13)
- Yvonne Elliman - vocals (1, 3–6)
- Marcy Levy - vocals (1, 3–8, 12, 13)
- Sergio Pastora Rodriguez - percussion (1–3)
- Bob Dylan - vocals (2)
- Robbie Robertson - guitar (2)
- Ron Wood - guitar (2)
- Albert Lee - guitar (9–11), keyboards (11), vocals (11)
- Chris Stainton - keyboards (9, 10, 12, 14), synthesizer and Hammond organ (13)
- Dave Markee - bass (9, 10)
- Henry Spinetti - drums (9, 10)
- Gary Brooker - keyboards (10)
- Ry Cooder - guitar (11)
- Donald "Duck" Dunn - bass (11–14)
- Roger Hawkins - drums (11)
- John Sambataro - vocals (11)
- Chuck Kirkpatrick - vocals (11)
- Peter Robinson - synthesizer (12, 13)
- Phil Collins - percussion (12, 15, 16), Simmons and snare drums (13), drums (14–16), vocals (15, 16)
- Ray Cooper - percussion (12, 13)
- Shaun Murphy - vocals (12, 13)
- Greg Phillinganes - keyboards (15, 16), vocals (15, 16)
- Nathan East - bass (15–17), vocals (17)
- Michael Brecker - sax (15)
- Jon Faddis - trumpet (15)
- Randy Brecker - trumpet (15)
- Dave Bargeron - trombone (15)
- Katie Kissoon - vocals (16)
- Tessa Niles - vocals (16)
- Alan Clark - keyboards (17)
- Andy Newmark - drums (17)

== Commercial success ==
Crossroads is Clapton's commercially most successful multi-disc boxed set, charting in both 1988 and 1989, selling a total of more than three million copies worldwide. In the United States it debuted in May 1988 at number 80 on Billboard magazine's Top 200 albums chart, making Clapton the second artist ever to chart in the Top 100 field with a box set containing six discs, following Elvis Presley. It also debuted at number eight on Billboard's Top Pop Compact Disks chart. In its first week in the charts, Crossroads was both the best- and fastest-selling box set ever to be released, selling more than 240,000 copies in the first few weeks after its release in the United States. At that point, more than 120,000 copies which were sold were on CD formats, which was still quite rare at the time. In its second week, it topped the Top Pop Compact Disks chart and reached number 36 on the Billboard Top 200 albums chart, peaking at 34 the next week and remaining on the chart for a total of 26 weeks. In 1988, the Clapton record was the 26th most-purchased pop music CD in the United States.

In Europe, the box set was a less successful. In the Netherlands, it reached number 60 and stayed a total of 11 weeks in the charts. It did not chart in the United Kingdom. In 2016, it reached number 44 in Greece.

In 2005, the album was certified with a triple Platinum award by the Recording Industry Association of America (RIAA), commemorating the sale of more than three million copies in the United States alone, making it Clapton's best-selling box set in the country.

== Chart positions ==
=== Weekly charts ===
Chart (1988)	Peak position
Dutch Albums (Album Top 100)	60
US Billboard 200	34
US Top Pop Compact Disks (Billboard)	1

Chart (2016)	Peak position
Greek Albums (IFPI)	44

=== Year-end charts ===
Chart (1988)	Position
US Top Pop Compact Disks (Billboard)	26

== Certifications ==
Region	Certification	Certified units/sales
United States (RIAA)	3× Platinum	3,000,000^{^}
^{^} Shipments figures based on certification alone.
