= Bottle of Red Wine =

Song by Eric Clapton

from the album Eric Clapton
- A-side: "Blues Power"
- Released: 1970
- Genre: Rock and roll · blues rock
- Length: 3:06
- Label: Polydor
- Songwriters: Eric Clapton and Bonnie Bramlett
- Producer: Delaney Bramlett

"Bottle of Red Wine" is an uptempo blues rock song, written and recorded by the British rock musician Eric Clapton for his eponymous studio album Eric Clapton in 1970 under Polydor Records. The recording was produced by Delaney Bramlett and is of a three-minute and six second duration. Polydor Records released the song as the B-side to the 1970 single release "Blues Power". The song is written in the key of C major, played with the blues scale. The title is also included on the 1972 compilation album Eric Clapton at His Best.
