= Who Am I Telling You? =

Song by Eric Clapton and J. J. Cale

from the album The Road to Escondido
- Released: November 7, 2006
- Length: 4:08
- Label: Duck · Reprise
- Songwriter(s): J. J. Cale
- Producer(s): Eric Clapton · J. J. Cale

"Who Am I Telling You?" is a song written by American singer-songwriter J. J. Cale who recorded the tune together with British rock guitarist Eric Clapton for their 2006 collaborative release The Road to Escondido for Duck and Reprise Records. The song features lead slide guitar playing by Derek Trucks from The Derek Trucks Band and The Allman Brothers Band and is written in the key of F major.

The song was recorded in August 2005 during the sessions for The Road to Escondido. Journalist Philip D. Huff from Twisted Ears calls the song "grand in its simplicity" whereas critic Doug Collette from All About Jazz praises Truck's slide guitar playing on the song, noting: "he is readily identifiable on 'Who Am I Telling You?'" but at the same time thinks that "neither these, nor other arrangements allow for much extended improvisation during which Trucks–and/or Clapton and Cale."

In 2016, a live version featuring Clapton and Cale was released on Live in San Diego.
