= Blues Power =

Single by Eric Clapton

from the album Eric Clapton
- B-side: "Bottle of Red Wine"
- Released: 1970
- Recorded: Early 1970
- Genre: Rock · blues rock
- Length: 3:08
- Label: Polydor
- Songwriter: Clapton · Leon Russell
- Producer: Delaney Bramlett · Tom Dowd

Eric Clapton singles chronology
"After Midnight" (1970)	"Blues Power" (1970)	"Let It Rain" (1972)

"Blues Power" is the second solo single by British rock musician Eric Clapton, off his 1970 debut studio album Eric Clapton. It was released in 1970 as a 7" vinyl gramophone record under Polydor Records. The song never reached any of the music charts worldwide.

== Composition and release ==
The song features a rock and roll style tempo and singing by Clapton, with the music and lyrics being stopped frequently with a pause between chosen lines. The song is in the key of C major. Besides being released on the studio album and as a single in 1970, the track is included on various live and compilation albums: The History of Eric Clapton (1972), Eric Clapton at His Best (1972), Just One Night (1980), Backtrackin' (1984), Time Pieces Vol.II Live in the Seventies (1985), Crossroads (1988) and The Cream of Clapton (1995). In total, the song is featured on over 15 albums.

== Critical reception ==
Music critic Robert Christgau argues that the songs "Bottle of Red Wine" and "Blues Power" do not deserve classic status, and goes on to criticise Clapton's performance on the song: "a party song called "Blues Power" from a man with a hellhound on his trail". AllMusic critic Stephen Thomas Erlewine says the song "isn't a blues song".

In his live album Leon Live, rock musician Leon Russell used the beginning few lines of the song, which he co-wrote, on his own song "Shoot Out on the Plantation".
