= Just One Night (Eric Clapton album) =

Live album by Eric Clapton
- Released: April 1980
- Recorded: 3–4 December 1979
- Venue: Nippon Budokan (Tokyo, Japan)
- Genre: Rock; blues
- Length: 89:11
- Label: RSO
- Producer: Eric Clapton, Jon Astley

Eric Clapton chronology
Backless (1978)	Just One Night (1980)	Another Ticket (1981)

Singles from Just One Night
- 1. "Tulsa Time" Released: June 1980; 2. "Cocaine" Released: June 1980; 3. "Blues Power" Released: September 1980

Just One Night is a 1980 double album by Eric Clapton, recorded live at the Budokan Theatre in Tokyo, Japan, in December 1979 when Clapton was touring to support Backless, his latest record at that time. The album reached No. 2 in the US and No. 3 in the UK, and was certified gold by RIAA.

== Reception ==
Professional ratings
Review scores
Source	Rating
AllMusic	link
Billboard	(unrated)
Rolling Stone	link

Critical reaction to the album has been largely positive. At the time of release Robert Christgau said the album contained "AM and FM faves" which were "served hot, raw, or both". "Ultimate Classic Rock" ranked the album in the "Top 100 Live Albums", and suggested that it was superior to the studio albums recorded by Clapton at the time.

== Track listing ==
=== Side one ===
1. "Tulsa Time" (Danny Flowers) – 4:00 (1979-12-03)
2. "Early in the Morning" (Traditional arranged by Eric Clapton) – 7:11 (1979-12-03)
3. "Lay Down Sally" (Clapton, Marcy Levy, George Terry) – 5:35 (1979-12-04)
4. "Wonderful Tonight" (Clapton) – 4:42 (1979-12-04)

=== Side two ===
1. "If I Don't Be There by Morning" (Bob Dylan, Helena Springs) – 4:26 (1979-12-04)
2. "Worried Life Blues" (Big Maceo Merriweather) – 8:28 (1979-12-04)
3. "All Our Past Times" (Clapton, Rick Danko) – 5:00 (1979-12-04)
4. "After Midnight" (J.J. Cale) – 5:38 (1979-12-03)

=== Side three ===
1. "Double Trouble" (Otis Rush) – 8:17 (1979-12-04)
2. "Setting Me Up" (Mark Knopfler) – 4:35 (1979-12-04)
3. "Blues Power" (Clapton, Leon Russell) – 7:23 (1979-12-04)

=== Side four ===
1. "Rambling On My Mind"/"Have You Ever Loved A Woman" (Robert Johnson/Traditional/Billy Myles) – 8:48 (1979-12-04)
2. "Cocaine" (J.J. Cale) – 7:39 (1979-12-04)
3. "Further on Up the Road" (Joe Veasey, Don Robey) – 7:17 (1979-12-04)

CD and digital issues combine sides 1 and 2 on CD 1 and sides 3 and 4 on CD 2.

== Personnel ==
- Eric Clapton – electric guitar, lead and backing vocals
- Albert Lee – electric guitar, backing and lead vocals ("Setting Me Up"), organ ("Worried Life Blues")
- Chris Stainton – keyboards
- Dave Markee – bass guitar
- Henry Spinetti – drums

== Chart performance ==
=== Weekly charts ===
Chart (1980)	Peak position
Australian Albums (ARIA)	22
Dutch Albums (Album Top 100)	36
Finnish Albums (Suomen virallinen lista)	30
French Albums (SNEP)	21
German Albums (Offizielle Top 100)	16
Japanese Albums (Oricon)	32
New Zealand Albums (RMNZ)	3
Norwegian Albums (VG-lista)	13
Swedish Albums (Sverigetopplistan)	44
UK Albums (OCC)	3
US Billboard 200	2

=== Year-end charts ===
Chart (1980)	Position
French Albums (SNEP)	9
German Albums (Offizielle Top 100)	71
New Zealand Albums (RMNZ)	38
US Billboard 200	47

== Certifications ==
Region	Certification	Certified units/sales
Australia (ARIA)	Platinum	70,000^{^}
New Zealand (RMNZ)	Gold	7,500^{^}
United Kingdom (BPI)	Silver	60,000^{^}
United States (RIAA)	Gold	500,000^{^}
^{^} Shipments figures based on certification alone.
