= Eric Clapton at His Best =

Greatest hits album by Eric Clapton
- Released: September 1972
- Genre: Rock
- Length: 80:00
- Label: Polydor, RSO
- Producer: various; see track listing for details

Eric Clapton chronology
The History of Eric Clapton (1972)	Eric Clapton at His Best (1972)	In Concert (1973)

Professional ratings
Review scores
Source	Rating
AllMusic	3/5 stars

Eric Clapton at His Best is a two-LP compilation of Eric Clapton's work after he left his earlier band Cream, released in September 1972. It was concurrently released with a two-LP compilation of Cream tracks, Heavy Cream, along with "at His Best" solo retrospectives by Cream's other members Jack Bruce and Ginger Baker.

== Overview ==
Although available in other territories as well, Eric Clapton at His Best was largely released to address the North American market, in order for Polydor Records to leverage Clapton's back catalog as, prior to 1972, Polydor had licensed Clapton's recordings to Atco/Atlantic Records for North American distribution. It was the first of two compilations of Clapton's early work that Polydor would issue; the second, Clapton, was released in mid-1973. Now out of print, Eric Clapton at His Best was available during the years 1972-76.

The album contains songs from Clapton's lone album with his 1969 band Blind Faith, his eponymous 1970 album, and from the lone studio album by Clapton's 1970-71 band Derek and the Dominos, Layla and Other Assorted Love Songs (1970).

== Chart performance ==
The album debuted on Billboard magazine's Top LP's & Tape chart in the issue dated October 14, 1972, and peaked at No. 87. In Cash Box magazine, the album reached No. 70 on its Top 100 Albums chart in the issue dated December 16, 1972.

== Track listing ==
=== Side one ===
1. "Bottle of Red Wine" (Delaney Bramlett/Eric Clapton) - 3:06
  - From Eric Clapton (1970). Produced by Delaney Bramlett.
2. "Anyday" (Eric Clapton/Bobby Whitlock) - 6:33
  - From Layla and Other Assorted Love Songs. Produced by The Dominos; executive producer Tom Dowd.
3. "I Looked Away" (Eric Clapton/Bobby Whitlock) - 3:02
  - From Layla and Other Assorted Love Songs.
4. "Let It Rain" (Bonnie Bramlett/Eric Clapton) - 5:07
  - From Eric Clapton.
5. "Lonesome and a Long Way from Home" (Bonnie Bramlett/Leon Russell) - 3:43
  - From Eric Clapton.

=== Side two ===
1. "Sea of Joy" (Steve Winwood) - 5:23
  - From Blind Faith (1969). Produced by Jimmy Miller by arrangement with Robert Stigwood and Chris Blackwell.
2. "Layla" (Eric Clapton/Jim Gordon) - 7:01
  - From Layla and Other Assorted Love Songs.
3. "Blues Power" (Eric Clapton/Leon Russell) - 3:10
  - From Eric Clapton.
4. "Bell Bottom Blues" (Eric Clapton/Bobby Whitlock) - 5:00
  - From Layla and Other Assorted Love Songs.

=== Side three ===
1. "After Midnight" (John J. Cale) - 3:11
  - From Eric Clapton.
2. "Keep On Growing" (Eric Clapton/Bobby Whitlock) - 6:20
  - From Layla and Other Assorted Love Songs.
3. "Little Wing" (Jimi Hendrix) - 5:31
  - From Layla and Other Assorted Love Songs.
4. "Presence of the Lord" (Eric Clapton) - 4:48
  - From Blind Faith.

=== Side four ===
1. "Why Does Love Got to Be So Sad?" (Eric Clapton/Bobby Whitlock) - 4:41
  - From Layla and Other Assorted Love Songs.
2. "Easy Now" (Eric Clapton) - 2:58
  - From Eric Clapton.
3. "Slunky" (Delaney Bramlett/Eric Clapton) - 3:33
  - From Eric Clapton.
4. "Key to the Highway" (Charles Segar/Bill Broonzy) - 9:39
  - From Layla and Other Assorted Love Songs.

== Personnel ==
- Eric Clapton – vocals, lead vocals, guitar
- Carl Radle – bass
- Jim Gordon – drums, percussion, piano
- Stephen Stills – guitar
- Bobby Whitlock – organ, piano, vocals, acoustic guitar
- John Simon – piano
- Leon Russell – piano
- Bobby Keys – saxophone
- Jim Price – trumpet
- J. I. Allison, Rita Coolidge, Sonny Curtis – vocals
- Delaney Bramlett – vocals, rhythm guitar
- Bonnie Bramlett – vocals
- Duane Allman – guitar
- Ric Grech – bass, guitar
- Ginger Baker – drums
- Steve Winwood – vocals, organ, guitar

== Charts ==
Chart (1972)	Peak position
US Top LP's & Tape (Billboard)	87
US Top 100 Albums (Cash Box)	70
