= Another Ticket =

Studio album by Eric Clapton
- Released: 20 February 1981
- Recorded: 1980
- Studios: Compass Point Studios (Nassau, Bahamas)
- Genre: Rock
- Length: 38:34
- Label: RSO
- Producer: Tom Dowd

Eric Clapton chronology
Backless (1978)	Another Ticket (1981)	Money and Cigarettes (1983)

Singles from Another Ticket
- 1. "I Can't Stand It" Released: 13 February 1981; 2. "Another Ticket" Released: 10 April 1981

Another Ticket is the seventh solo studio album by Eric Clapton. Recorded and produced by Tom Dowd at the Compass Point Studios in Nassau, Bahamas with Albert Lee, it was Clapton's last studio album for RSO Records before the label shut down in 1983 as it was absorbed by Polydor Records. It received moderate reviews and achieved modest commercial success peaking at No. 18 in the UK charts.

== Release ==
It was his last album for RSO Records. Another Ticket was recorded at the Compass Point Studios in Nassau, Bahamas and features fellow guitarist and country legend, Albert Lee. The album was originally released as a gramophone record, accompanied by a music cassette & 8-Track cartridge. In 1990 the album was released on compact disc format and was made available for digital music download in 1996.

== Chart performance ==
The studio album was successful in the charts, reaching the Top 40 in seven countries, on three of which it peaked in the Top 10. In New Zealand, the release reached its highest position at No. 3. In Norway and in the United States, Another Ticket reached Nos. 5 and 7, respectively. In the United Kingdom, the release placed itself at No. 18. In Germany and Sweden, the album reached No. 26. In the Netherlands, Another Ticket peaked at No. 38.

== Reception ==
Professional ratings
Review scores
Source	Rating
AllMusic	link
Rolling Stone	link

In a retrospective review for AllMusic, William Ruhlmann feels that the album is "star-crossed", "not too shabby", and while it "wasn't great Clapton" it should have got more notice than it did. Rolling Stone journalist John Piccarella notes: "Rita Mae” [...] is the only song on side two that’s not about dying. It's about murder. As an artist often criticized for mellowing out, Eric Clapton has succeeded in making very popular music from an authentic and deeply tragic blues sensibility. He addresses both the heart and the charts in the same way: with a bullet."

Robert Palmer of The New York Times said the album was "dominated by commercial soft rock and evidences little of his celebrated mid-60's fire. He is a singer and songwriter who now just happens to play guitar, not an aggressive soloist."

== Songs ==
Record World said of the title track that "light keyboard melodies back Clapton's little tenor and the production is superb."

== Track listing ==
All tracks written by Eric Clapton, except where noted.

Side one
No.	Title	Writer(s)	Length
1.	"Something Special"		2:36
2.	"Black Rose"	Troy Seals; Eddie Setser	3:44
3.	"Blow Wind Blow"	Muddy Waters	2:58
4.	"Another Ticket"		5:43
5.	"I Can't Stand It"		4:07

Side two
No.	Title	Writer(s)	Length
1.	"Hold Me Lord"		3:27
2.	"Floating Bridge"	Sleepy John Estes	6:32
3.	"Catch Me If You Can"	Clapton; Gary Brooker	4:24
4.	"Rita Mae"		5:03
Total length:			38:34

== Personnel ==
- Eric Clapton – guitars, vocals
- Gary Brooker – keyboards, backing vocals
- Chris Stainton – keyboards
- Albert Lee – guitars, backing vocals
- Dave Markee – bass
- Henry Spinetti – drums, percussion

== Production ==
- Tom Dowd – producer, engineer
- Michael Carnevale – engineer at Compass Point Studios.
- Kendal Stubbs – assistant engineer at Compass Point Studios.
- Bob Castle – assistant engineer at Criteria Studios.
- Jon Walls – assistant engineer at AIR Studios.
- Mike Fuller – mastering at Criteria Studios.
- Rob O'Connor – art direction, design
- Steve Sandon – photography
- Alan Dempsey – hand lettering

== Charts ==
=== Weekly charts ===
Chart (1981)	Peak position
Australian Albums (Kent Music Report)	30
Canada Top Albums/CDs (RPM)	20
Dutch Albums (Album Top 100)	38
German Albums (Offizielle Top 100)	26
Italian Albums (Musica e Dischi)	22
Japanese Albums (Oricon)	27
New Zealand Albums (RMNZ)	3
Norwegian Albums (VG-lista)	5
Swedish Albums (Sverigetopplistan)	26
UK Albums (Official Charts)	18
US Billboard 200	7

=== Year-end charts ===
Chart (1981)	Position
US Billboard 200	72

== Certifications ==
Region	Certification	Certified units/sales
Canada (Music Canada)	Gold	50,000^{^}
United States (RIAA)	Gold	500,000^{^}
^{^} Shipments figures based on certification alone.
