= I Can't Stand It (Eric Clapton song) =

Single by Eric Clapton

from the album Another Ticket
- B-side: "Black Rose"
- Released: 13 February 1981
- Recorded: 1980
- Genre: Rock
- Length: 4:08
- Label: RSO
- Songwriter: Eric Clapton
- Producer: Tom Dowd

Eric Clapton singles chronology
"Blues Power (Live)" (1980)	"I Can't Stand It" (1981)	"Another Ticket" (1981)

"I Can't Stand It" is the first single from Eric Clapton's 1981 album Another Ticket. On the record label for the vinyl 45, it is credited to Eric Clapton and His Band.

== Reception ==
Record World called it a "dark, driving rocker with Clapton's vocal lurking ominously around drum spanks & keyboard textures."

AllMusic critic Matthew Greenwald recalls the song as "one of Eric Clapton's biggest hits from the early '80s" and found "this song found him continuing, in his words, to be as much a musicologist as a musician." Greenwald goes on to saying that the song's "lyrics have a venomous jealousy, and they are some of Clapton's most literate of the period". He rounded his review up by saying that "musically, some classic, almost Booker T. & the M.G.'s-styled chord changes highlight the driving tempo, providing Clapton with a huge hit". William Ruhlman of AllMusic recalls that I Can't Stand It "held up well".

Besides becoming a pop hit in its own right, reaching No. 10 on the Billboard Hot 100, it was also the first No. 1 song on Billboard's Top Tracks chart for rock songs, which debuted in March 1981. It stayed at the summit for two weeks. The song reached No. 15 in Canada. By 1981, Broadcast Music, Inc. measured more than one million broadcasts of the song, earning Clapton a special recognition certificate.

== Personnel ==
- Eric Clapton – lead vocals, lead guitar
- Albert Lee – rhythm guitar
- Gary Brooker – keyboards
- Dave Markee – bass guitar
- Henry Spinetti – drums

== Chart positions ==
=== Weekly charts ===
Chart (1981)	Peak position
Canada (CHUM)	7
Canada (RPM)	15
France (IFOP)	62
Israel (IBA)	1
Italy (AFI)	99
Japan (Oricon)	84
US Billboard Hot 100	10
US Top Rock Tracks (Billboard)	1

Year-end chart (1981)	Rank
US Top Pop Singles (Billboard)	67

== See also ==
- List of Billboard Mainstream Rock number-one songs of the 1980s
