= Let It Grow =

1974 song by Eric Clapton

Song by Eric Clapton

from the album 461 Ocean Boulevard
- Released: July 1974
- Length: 5:00
- Label: RSO
- Songwriter: Eric Clapton
- Producer: Tom Dowd

"Let It Grow" is a song written by Eric Clapton that was first released on his 1974 album 461 Ocean Boulevard.

== Lyrics and music ==
"Let It Grow" is a spiritual ballad that has alternatively been described as a love song and as a devotional religious song. Classic Rock magazine described it as "reflective rock". Allmusic critic Stephen Thomas Erlewine described it as "emotional". Music critic Marc Roberty described it as "haunting".

Music journalist Andrew Wild described the music as building "from a hushed whisper through some Beatlesque arpeggios to a stirring, swelling instrumental finale." Something Else! critic Beverly Patterson similarly described the song as "Starting out on a delicate, folk oriented note, [it[ builds momentum at a nice, balanced pace [and] swells slowly but surely, as it melts into an electrified forum of emotion and technique." Patterson also noted some "bluesy licks" in the middle of the song. The musical accompaniment of "Let It Grow" includes dobro and acoustic guitar. Yvonne Elliman provided background vocals.

Years after releasing the song, Clapton noticed a resemblance to Led Zeppelin's classic "Stairway to Heaven". Clapton said "I was very proud of my inventiveness in the verse [of] 'Let It Grow'. It was several years before I realized that I had totally ripped off 'Stairway to Heaven'."

The opening line references an earlier song "Crossroads" that Clapton had covered while with Cream with the lyrics "Standing at the crossroads/Trying to read the signs/To tell me which way I should go/To find the answer". Patterson described the lyrics of the verses as being romantic, but also having a "spiritual essence". Radio hosts Pete Fornatale and Bill Ayres interpreted the lyrics that when dealing with a dilemma in dealing with other people you should remember that "love is lovely" and recognize that "a growth in our ability to love ourselves and others will take us from the crossroads and onto the right path" and so even though that can be difficult, we should – as a lyric from the song states – "plant your love and let it grow."

== Reception ==
Ultimate Classic Rock critic Michael Gallucci and Classic Rock History critic Brett Stewart both rated "Let It Grow" to be Clapton's 7th best solo song. Gallucci praised "its unhurried pace and quiet, reflective tone." Stewart called it a "killer ballad" and said that it "takes advantage of a simplistic atmosphere dominated by acoustic guitars and a slide guitar." Patterson called it "absolutely breathtaking" and said it was a preview of the softer approach Clapton would take in the future. Washington Post critic Richard Harrington also noted that it is representative of the change in Clapton's output to more melodic, less intense approach, while retaining inventive guitar playing. Eric Clapton FAQ author David Bowling stated that the song showed "Clapton's growth as a songwriter" and particularly praised Elliman's background vocal performance. Wild praised the beautiful production. Miami Herald critic Doug Adrianson described it as "soothing" with a "laid-back vocal and stately guitar work."

"Let It Grow" has been included on several of Clapton's compilation albums, including Timepieces: The Best of Eric Clapton in 1982, The Cream of Eric Clapton in 1987, Crossroads in 1988, 20th Century Masters – The Millennium Collection: The Best of Eric Clapton in 2004 and Complete Clapton in 2007. It was also including on the 1980 K-Tel multi-artist compilation album The Summit.
