= Eric Clapton (album) =

Studio album by Eric Clapton
- Released: 12 August 1970 (US)
- Recorded: November 1969 – March 1970
- Studios: Olympic, London; Village Recorder, Los Angeles; Island, London
- Genres: Rock; blues; blues rock
- Length: 36:41
- Labels: Atco; Polydor
- Producer: Delaney Bramlett

Eric Clapton chronology
On Tour with Eric Clapton (1970)	Eric Clapton (1970)	Layla and Other Assorted Love Songs (1970)

Singles from Eric Clapton
- 1. "After Midnight" Released: October 1970; 2. "Blues Power" Released: 1970 (EU)

Eric Clapton is the self-titled debut solo studio album by English rock musician Eric Clapton, released in August 1970 by Atco and Polydor Records.

== Background and artwork ==
After being in several successful rock bands including The Yardbirds, John Mayall & the Bluesbreakers, Cream and Blind Faith, Clapton recorded an album under his own name in late 1969 and early 1970. The album cover, photographed by Barry Feinstein, depicts Clapton sitting in a Los Angeles photo studio while smoking a cigarette, his Fender Stratocaster Brownie electric guitar leaning between his legs.

== Recording ==
Clapton recorded some tracks in November 1969 at London's Olympic Studios and went on to record more songs in 1970 in two sessions; one in January 1970 at the Village Recorders Studio in West Los Angeles and a second session in March the same year at Island Studios in London. A large number of musicians that worked with Clapton on the album had been working with the band Delaney & Bonnie, which previously opened the Blind Faith gigs. The musicians included the core of Derek & the Dominos, including co-creator and co-songwriter Bobby Whitlock, who can be heard on "Let It Rain".

The song "Let it Rain" had originally been recorded with different lyrics as "She Rides". Three mixes of the album were done, one by Delaney Bramlett, one by Tom Dowd and one by Clapton himself. The 11-track Clapton mix was the one used for the original release. Bramlett's 10-track album mix without "Told You for the Last Time", is included in the Deluxe Edition released on CD in 2006.

In an interview from 2006, promoting The Road to Escondido, Clapton recalled that he was very happy making this album and was pleased with the results of the recording sessions, but also noted that "the only thing [he] didn't like about the album is [his] voice", because it sounds so "high" and "young", which Clapton disliked because he "always wanted to sound like an old guy".

== Critical reception ==
Professional ratings
Review scores
Source	Rating
AllMusic	4.5/5 stars
Christgau's Record Guide	B
Q	4/5 stars

Contemporary reviews were largely positive. Rolling Stone noted the "warm, friendly" aspect of the record, commending "Clapton's voice" and the "mean guitar". Robert Christgau rated the album with the "B" mark and noted: "I blame a conceptual error, rather than Clapton's uncertain singing, for the overall thinness. As a sideman, Clapton slipped into producer Delaney Bramlett's downhome bliss as easily as he did into Cream's blues dreamscape, but as a solo artist he can't simulate Delaney's optimism".

In a retrospective review for AllMusic Stephen Thomas Erlewine feels that Clapton "sounds more laid-back and straightforward than any of the guitarist's previous recordings. There are still elements of blues and rock & roll, but they're hidden beneath layers of gospel, R&B, country, and pop flourishes. And the pop element of the record is the strongest of the album's many elements". Erlewine finishes his summary by stating "it's encouraging to hear him grow and become a more fully rounded musician, but too often the album needs the spark that some long guitar solos would have given it. In short, it needs a little more of Clapton's personality." Q magazine described the album as swinging "like leaves in the breeze".

== Track listings ==
Side one
No.	Title	Writer(s)	Length
1.	"Slunky"	Eric Clapton · Bonnie Bramlett	3:34
2.	"Bad Boy"	Clapton · B. Bramlett	3:34
3.	"Lonesome and a Long Way from Home"	Leon Russell · B. Bramlett	3:29
4.	"After Midnight"	J. J. Cale	2:51
5.	"Easy Now"	Clapton	2:57
6.	"Blues Power"	Clapton · Russell	3:09
Total length:			19:34

Side two
No.	Title	Writer(s)	Length
1.	"Bottle of Red Wine"	Clapton · B. Bramlett	3:06
2.	"Lovin' You Lovin' Me"	Clapton · B. Bramlett	3:19
3.	"Told You for the Last Time"	Steve Cropper · B. Bramlett	2:30
4.	"Don't Know Why"	Clapton · B. Bramlett	3:10
5.	"Let It Rain"	Clapton · B. Bramlett	5:02
Total length:			17:07

=== 2006 Deluxe Edition ===
Disc one – The Tom Dowd Mix
No.	Title	Length
1.	"Slunky"	3:33
2.	"Bad Boy"	3:33
3.	"Lonesome and a Long Way from Home"	3:29
4.	"After Midnight"	2:51
5.	"Easy Now"	2:57
6.	"Blues Power"	3:08
7.	"Bottle of Red Wine"	3:06
8.	"Lovin' You, Lovin' Me"	3:19
9.	"Told You for the Last Time"	2:30
10.	"Don't Know Why"	3:10
11.	"Let It Rain"	5:02
12.	"Blues in 'A'" (session outtake) (bonus track)	10:25
13.	"Teasin'" (King Curtis with Delaney Bramlett, Eric Clapton & Friends) (bonus track)	2:14
14.	"She Rides" ("Let It Rain" alternate version) (bonus track)	5:08
Total length:		54:41

Disc two – The Delaney Bramlett Mix
No.	Title	Length
1.	"Slunky"	3:33
2.	"Bad Boy"	3:41
3.	"Easy Now"	2:57
4.	"After Midnight"	3:17
5.	"Blues Power"	3:19
6.	"Bottle of Red Wine"	3:06
7.	"Lovin' You, Lovin' Me"	4:03
8.	"Lonesome and a Long Way from Home"	3:48
9.	"Don't Know Why"	3:43
10.	"Let It Rain"	5:03
11.	"Don't Know Why" (Olympic Studios version) (bonus track)	5:12
12.	"I've Told You for the Last Time" (Olympic Studios version) (bonus track)	6:46
13.	"Comin' Home" (Delaney & Bonnie and Friends Featuring Eric Clapton, single A-side, 1969) (bonus track)	3:14
14.	"Groupie (Superstar)" (Delaney & Bonnie and Friends Featuring Eric Clapton, single B-side, 1969) (bonus track)	2:48
Total length:		54:50

=== 2010 Rarities Edition ===
Essential Collector's tracks
No.	Title	Length
1.	"Slunky"	3:34
2.	"Bad Boy"	3:41
3.	"Easy Now"	2:58
4.	"After Midnight"	3:17
5.	"Blues Power"	3:19
6.	"Bottle of Red Wine"	3:07
7.	"Lovin' You, Lovin' Me"	4:04
8.	"Lonesome and a Long Way from Home"	3:48
9.	"Don't Know Why"	3:44
10.	"Let It Rain"	5:03
11.	"Don't Know Why"	5:12
12.	"I've Told You for the Last Time"	6:47
13.	"Blues in 'A'"	10:26
14.	"She Rides"	5:09
Total length:		74:15

== Personnel ==
- Eric Clapton – lead vocals, rhythm guitars, lead guitars
- Delaney Bramlett – rhythm guitars, backing vocals
- Stephen Stills – guitar solo (bridge on "Let It Rain"), bass guitar (outro of "Let It Rain"), backing vocals
- Leon Russell – piano
- John Simon – piano
- Bobby Whitlock – organ, backing vocals
- Carl Radle – bass
- Jim Gordon – drums
- Bobby Keys – saxophones
- Jim Price – trumpet
- Jerry Allison – backing vocals
- Bonnie Bramlett – backing vocals
- Rita Coolidge – backing vocals
- Sonny Curtis – backing vocals

== Production ==
- Producer and arranged by Delaney Bramlett
- Engineer – Bill Halverson
- Recorded at The Village Recorder (Los Angeles, California)
- Photography and album design – Barry Feinstein
- Equipment – Bill Reed, Clark

== Charts ==
Chart (1970)	Peak position
Canada Top Albums/CDs (RPM)	18
Japanese Albums (Oricon)	85
Norwegian Albums (VG-lista)	17
UK Albums (Official Charts)	14
US Billboard 200	13

Chart (2021)	Peak position
Austrian Albums (Ö3 Austria)	49
Belgian Albums (Ultratop Flanders)	196
Belgian Albums (Ultratop Wallonia)	162
German Albums (Offizielle Top 100)	23
Scottish Albums (Official Charts)	63
Swiss Albums (Schweizer Hitparade)	14
