= After Midnight (J. J. Cale song) =

1966 rock song by J. J. Cale

Single by J.J. Cale

from the album Naturally
- B-side: "Slow Motion" (1966) "Crying Eyes" (1972)
- Released: November 1966; 1972 (re-recording)
- Length: 2:37; 2:54 (re-recording)
- Label: Liberty Records (1966); Shelter Records (1972)
- Songwriter(s): J.J. Cale
- Producer(s): Johnny Cale

Official Audio
- "After Midnight" on YouTube

"After Midnight"
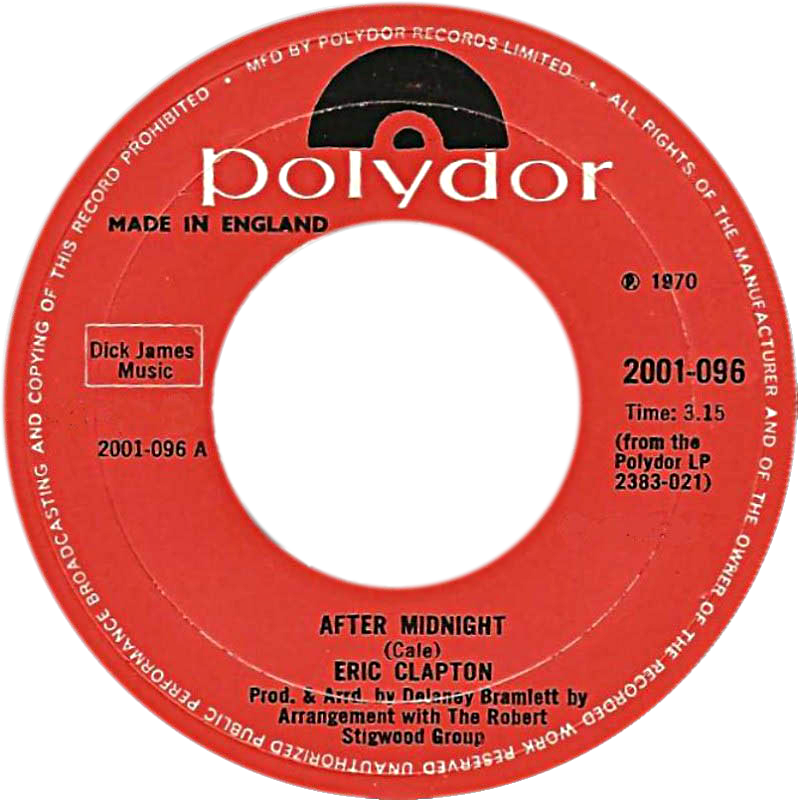
- 1970 UK vinyl single

Single by Eric Clapton

from the album Eric Clapton
- B-side: "Easy Now"
- Released: October 1970
- Recorded: January 1970
- Studio: Island (London)
- Genre: Blues rock
- Length: 3:15 (or 2:51)
- Label: Polydor
- Songwriter(s): J. J. Cale
- Producer(s): Delaney Bramlett

Eric Clapton singles chronology
"After Midnight" (1970)	"Blues Power" (1970)

"After Midnight" is a rock song by J. J. Cale, first released in 1966. Eric Clapton later covered it for his eponymous album, released in 1970. Clapton's rendition became a success, prompting Cale to re-record the song for his own 1971 album Naturally. In 1987, Clapton later re-recorded the song for a Michelob beer commercial and then released the re-recording as a single. "After Midnight" has been considered one of Clapton's signature songs throughout his career. Other artists covered the song in later years.

== Background and releases ==
Cale recorded the song and then released it in 1966 as a single with its flipside track "Slow Motion". When Eric Clapton was working with Delaney & Bonnie Bramlett, Delaney Bramlett introduced Clapton to the music of J.J. Cale. "After Midnight" was the first of several Cale cover songs released by Clapton and appeared on his self-titled debut album. The performers on this version were Clapton on vocals and guitar, Bobby Whitlock on organ and vocals, Jim Gordon on drums, Delaney Bramlett on rhythm guitar, Carl Radle on bass, Leon Russell on piano, Jim Price on trumpet, and Bobby Keys on saxophone. It also appears on Just One Night, a live album recorded in Japan in 1979.

In 1987, Clapton re-recorded the song for a Michelob beer commercial. The 1988 re-recording was released on the anthology box set Crossroads and as a single with different B-side tracks: "I Can't Stand It" for the seven-inch vinyl, "Whatcha Gonna Do" for the twelve-inch vinyl and the CD, and live recording "Sunshine of Your Love" as the CD's one of three tracks. Another live version was released on Live from Madison Square Garden with Steve Winwood on organ.

Clapton said in his 2014 interview with The San Diego Union-Tribune:

The construction of "After Midnight" was great and it had everything[.] The thing that summed up J.J. for me is it had a little country, a little blues, it was rock and there was this guitar part that was baffling. That has always been the fascinating part; I still don’t think we got it right [on my version]. I’ve always been in awe of J.J.’s technique... He was a rhythm guitar player and a great lead guitar player, too. But when he played rhythm, it was very difficult to get it and know what he was doing.

When we [recorded] it, me and Delaney both did [the guitar part] it at [the] same time, and it was a really difficult claw-hammer [picking] thing. I thought: "This is too hard," so we made a meal out of it. What got me is that it appeared to be a very complex track and I was just intrigued, and thought: "I've got to try and get this [right]." Cale was coming from this very soulful white music. It was at Delaney's insistence that I did ['After Midnight'], and that was probably one of the first songs we decided to record. And that began my association with J.J., really.

Cale was unaware of Clapton's recording of the song until it became a radio hit in 1970. He recalled to Mojo magazine that when he heard Clapton's version playing on his radio, "I was dirt poor, not making enough to eat and I wasn’t a young man. I was in my thirties, so I was very happy. It was nice to make some money." Cale's friend and producer Audie Ashworth then encouraged him to capitalize on the song's success by recording a full album, Naturally, released in 1971. Cale issued the re-recorded version as a single the following year with its B-side track, "Crying Eyes." The re-recorded version reached #42 on the Billboard Hot 100.

Cale told The San Diego Union-Tribune in his 1990 interview about Clapton's version:

I thought: 'Well, that won't go anywhere'. [...] A year later, they started playing it on every radio station, including in my hometown. The first time I heard it on my car radio I just drove off to the side of the road. Because I'd never heard anything of my own on the radio before...

All record companies want big-selling records, and my music is a little too raw for commercial success. People are familiar with my songs, especially through Eric Clapton. But I have a hard time drawing a crowd, because I have been a songwriter. I've never sold a lot of records; my music's gotten much more famous than me.

Cale released a live version on the album Live in 2001.

== Chart performance ==
Eric Clapton versions
Chart (1970–1988)	Peak position
Australia (Kent Music Report)	51
Canada (CHUM)	9
Canadian Top Singles (RPM)	10
Japanese Singles (Oricon)	87
Netherlands (Dutch Top 40)	25
Netherlands (Single Top 100)	19
New Zealand (Recorded Music NZ)	17
UK Singles (OCC)	99
US Billboard Hot 100	18
US Mainstream Rock (Billboard)	4
US Cash Box Top 100	13

J. J. Cale version
Chart (1972)	Peak position
US Billboard Hot 100	42

== Critical reception ==
Thom Owens of AllMusic said in his review about Cale's 1972 album Naturally, including Cale's re-recorded version of the song, that "Cale effortlessly capture[s] a lazy, rolling boogie" opposite to the early 1970s mainstream "styles of boogie, blues, and country rock."

Cash Box said of Clapton's version that "driving dance rhythm and Clapton's guitar work unite to create sales force behind the effort." Record World said that Eric Clapton sings 'After Midnight' in a soulful way and lays down some boss riffs."

== Album title ==
There was also a DVD accompanied by two audio CDs (released in 2006) from a concert (featuring former Dire Straits frontman Mark Knopfler) filmed at the Shoreline Amphitheatre in Mountain View, California, on 21 September 1988, which contains 14 tracks that span Clapton's entire career including classic hits from his stint with Cream, Blind Faith, Derek & The Dominos, as well as his successful solo work.

== Other cover versions ==
In addition to Clapton, the song has been recorded by various artists, like Chet Atkins, Jerry Garcia Band, Pretty Lights, Phish, Maggie Bell, The Disco Biscuits, Marc Cohn, Danny Elfman, Tom Barman and Guy Van Nueten, and Mark Gillespie. Sérgio Mendes and his band Brasil '77 covered the song for their 1971 album País Tropical. It was also recorded by the reggae band the Pioneers under the title "Let It All Hang Out" on the album Yeah, from 1971, released by Trojan Records. Both, Furthur and Yonder Mountain String Band, performed the song live at All Good Music Festival in 2010. The modern bluegrass band Seldom Scene recorded the song as the title track of their 1981 album of the same name, and often featured an extended-jam version in their concerts. The John Mayer Trio performed a version of the song on Late Night with Seth Meyers on February 27, 2014.

== See also ==
- "Cocaine", another Cale song made famous by Clapton.
