= Derek and the Dominos =

English–American blues-rock band (1970–1971)

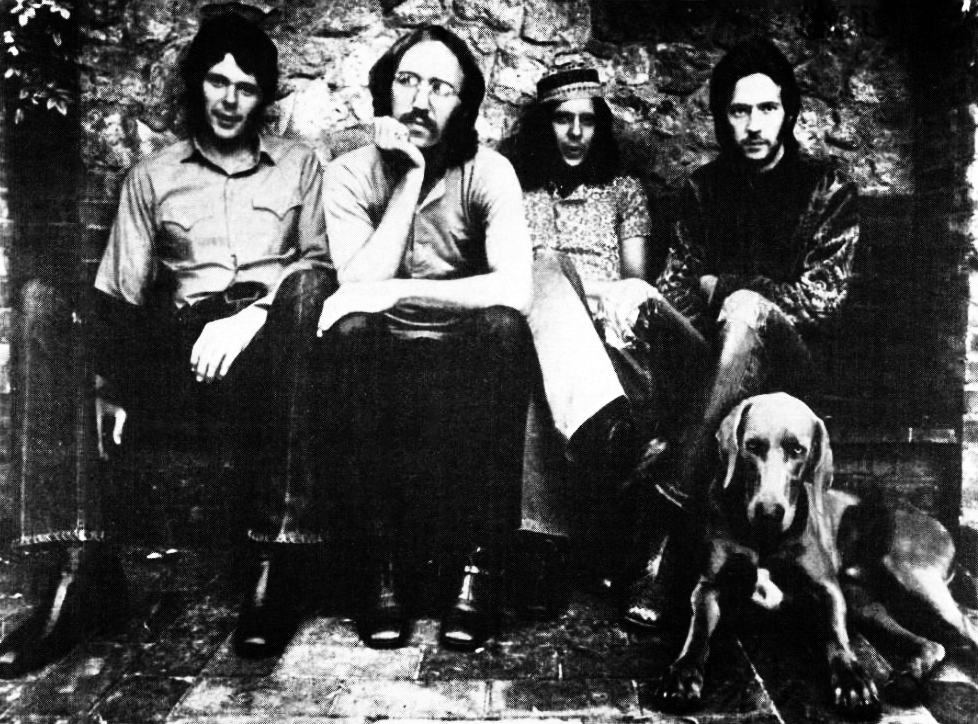
- Derek and the Dominos in February 1971. L–R: Jim Gordon, Carl Radle, Bobby Whitlock, Eric Clapton

Background information
- Origin: London, England
- Genres: Blues rock; blue-eyed soul; rock and roll
- Years active: 1970–1971
- Labels: Polydor, Atco, RSO
- Past members: Eric Clapton; Bobby Whitlock; Carl Radle; Jim Gordon; Dave Mason; Duane Allman

Derek and the Dominos were an English–American blues rock band formed in the spring of 1970 by singer-guitarist Eric Clapton, keyboardist-singer Bobby Whitlock, bassist Carl Radle and drummer Jim Gordon. All four members had previously played together in Delaney & Bonnie and Friends, during and after Clapton's brief tenure with Blind Faith. Dave Mason supplied additional lead guitar on early studio sessions and played at their first live gig. Another participant at their first session as a band was George Harrison, the recording for whose album All Things Must Pass marked the formation of Derek and the Dominos. Following the deaths of Radle in 1980, Gordon in 2023, and Whitlock in 2025, Clapton is the last surviving member of the band's official line-up.

The band's only album release, Layla and Other Assorted Love Songs, was produced by Tom Dowd, and also featured extensive contributions on lead and slide guitar from Duane Allman. A double album, Layla did not immediately enjoy strong sales or receive widespread radio airplay, but went on to earn critical acclaim. Although released in 1970 it was not until March 1972 that the album's single "Layla" (a tale of unrequited love inspired by Clapton's infatuation with his friend George Harrison's wife, Pattie Boyd) made the top ten in both the United States and the United Kingdom. The album is often considered to be the defining achievement of Clapton's career.

== History ==
=== Background and formation ===
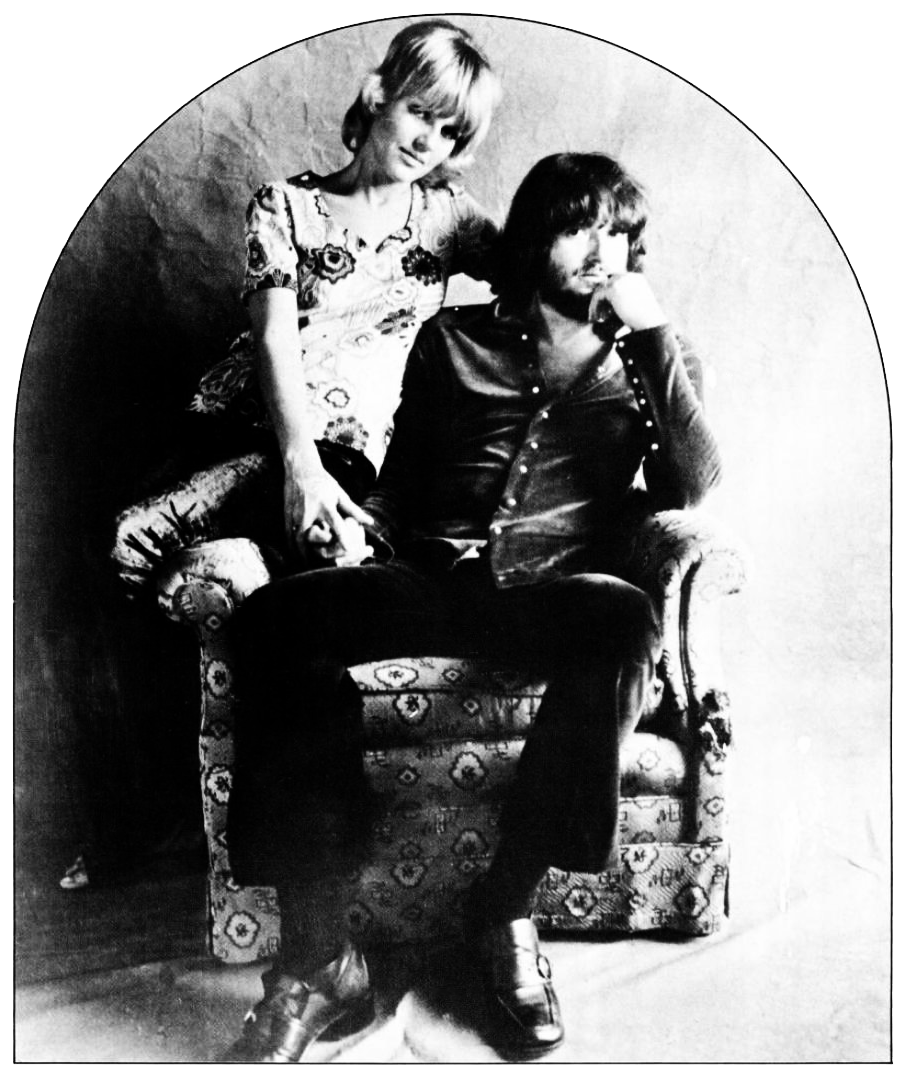
The members of Derek and the Dominos met while touring as backing members of Delaney & Bonnie and Friends, a rock/soul band fronted by Delaney and Bonnie Bramlett.

Derek and the Dominos came about through its four members' involvement in the American rock/soul revue Delaney & Bonnie and Friends. The group were anchored by the musical duo Delaney and Bonnie Bramlett with a rotating ensemble of supporting members. Delaney & Bonnie and Friends opened for Blind Faith, Eric Clapton's short-lived supergroup with Steve Winwood and Ginger Baker, on a US tour in the summer of 1969. While on that tour, Clapton was drawn to Delaney & Bonnie's relative anonymity, which he found more appealing than the excessive fan worship lavished on his own band.

Together with his fellow future Dominos – Bobby Whitlock (vocals, keyboards), Carl Radle (bass) and Jim Gordon (drums) – Clapton toured Europe and the United States again between November 1969 and March 1970, this time as a member of Delaney & Bonnie and Friends. In addition, the entire band backed him on his debut solo album, Eric Clapton, recorded over the same period. Disagreements over money led several members to leave Delaney & Bonnie and Friends. Whitlock, recalling other difficulties with Delaney and Bonnie, noted the couple's frequent fights and described Delaney as a demanding band leader in the manner of James Brown. Gordon, Radle and other Friends personnel, including drummer Jim Keltner, immediately joined Joe Cocker's Mad Dogs and Englishmen tour with Leon Russell, but Whitlock remained with Delaney and Bonnie for a short time.

In April 1970, at the suggestion of his friend and mentor, former Stax session guitarist Steve Cropper, Whitlock travelled to England to visit Clapton. Whitlock subsequently lived in Hurtwood Edge, Clapton's house in Surrey, where the two musicians jammed and began to write the bulk of the Dominos' catalogue on acoustic guitars. Many of the new songs reflected Clapton's deep infatuation with Pattie Boyd, the wife of his best friend George Harrison, who had joined Clapton as a guitarist on Delaney & Bonnie's European tour in December 1969.

I was in absolute awe of these people ... All we did was jam and jam and jam and night would become day and day would become night, and it just felt good to me to stay that way. I had never felt so musically free before.

— Eric Clapton, on the band's rehearsals at Hurtwood Edge

Soon after Whitlock's arrival, he and Clapton were eager to form a new band and contacted Radle and Gordon in the United States. Although their first choice for a drummer was Keltner – like Radle and Russell, a native of Tulsa – he was busy recording with jazz guitarist Gábor Szabó. Gordon, however, had been invited to London to work on Harrison's post-Beatles solo album All Things Must Pass. In May that year, Clapton, Whitlock, Radle and Gordon reunited in London at a session for P.P. Arnold, before going on to serve as the backing band on much of Harrison's album. In a 1990 interview, Clapton said, "We made our bones, really, on that album with George", since the four musicians had "no game plan" other than living at Hurtwood Edge, "getting stoned, and playing and semi-writing songs".

Clapton biographer Harry Shapiro comments on the unprecedented aspect of Clapton's bond with his new bandmates, in that from the Blind Faith tour onwards, the guitarist "had been able to build a working relationship in a slow and natural fashion" for the first time. Among the friendships formed before the group officially came into existence, Shapiro continues, "the empathy ... outcropped most noticeably in Bobby Whitlock, in whom Eric found an accomplished and sympathetic songwriting partner and back-up vocalist." Clapton and Whitlock considered adding the Delaney & Bonnie horn section to their new band, but this plan was abandoned. Whitlock later explained the ethos of Derek and the Dominos: "we didn't want any horns, we didn't want no chicks, we wanted a rock 'n' roll band. But my vocal concept was that we approach singing like Sam and Dave did: [Clapton] sings a line, I sing a line, we sing together."

=== Concert debut ===
Towards the end of the sessions for the basic tracks on All Things Must Pass, Dave Mason – another former guitarist with Delaney & Bonnie – joined the Dominos at Clapton's home. With the lineup expanded to a five-piece band, Derek and the Dominos gave their debut live performance on 14 June 1970. The event was a charity concert in aid of the Dr. Spock Civil Liberties Legal Defence Fund, held at London's Lyceum Theatre.

The group had been billed as "Eric Clapton and Friends", but a discussion ensued backstage just before their appearance, with Harrison and pianist Tony Ashton among those involved, in an effort to find a proper band name. Clapton recalls that Ashton suggested "Del and the Dominos", having taken to calling the guitarist "Derek" or "Del" since the Delaney & Bonnie tour the previous year. Whitlock maintains that "the Dynamics" was the name chosen and that Ashton, following his opening set with Ashton, Gardner and Dyke, mispronounced it when introducing the band. Writing in 2013, Clapton and Whitlock biographer Marc Roberty quoted Jeff Dexter, the MC at the Lyceum show, who recalled that "Derek and the Dominos" had already been decided on before they went on stage. According to Dexter, Clapton was immediately taken with the name, but Whitlock, Radle and Gordon – all Americans – were concerned that they might be mistaken for a doo-wop act.

Everybody knew [about Clapton's infatuation with Pattie Boyd]. George didn't give a shit – but Eric didn't know that.

— Bobby Whitlock, on the obsession that drove Clapton's creativity in Derek and the Dominos

The reception afforded the band from critics and fans was mixed. Together with the unfavourable reviews for Clapton's first solo album, Eric Clapton released earlier in 1970, particularly in Britain, this reaction was reflective of a widespread reluctance to view Clapton as a singer and frontman, rather than as the virtuoso guitarist synonymous with his role in bands such as Cream, Blind Faith, and The Yardbirds. In his 2007 autobiography, Clapton wrote that his main recollection of the Lyceum show was consulting New Orleans–born musician Dr. John, a self-styled practitioner of voodoo, and receiving a package made of straw that would serve as a means of winning Boyd's affection.

=== Recording with Phil Spector ===
In return for the Dominos' assistance on All Things Must Pass, Clapton and Harrison had agreed that the latter's co-producer, Phil Spector, would produce a single for the new group. On 18 June, the five band members, together with Harrison on guitar, took part in a session for the single at the Beatles' Apple Studio in central London. With Spector producing, two Clapton–Whitlock compositions were recorded that day – "Tell the Truth" and "Roll It Over" – along with two instrumental jams that would be included on the Apple Jam disc of Harrison's triple album.

After this London session, Mason departed from the lineup; he later told Melody Maker that he was impatient to see the band start working full-time whereas Clapton was committed to helping Harrison complete All Things Must Pass. Clapton and Whitlock then contributed to the overdubbing phase of Harrison's album, including adding backing vocals with Harrison (as "the George O'Hara-Smith Singers") to tracks such as "All Things Must Pass" and "Awaiting on You All". In addition, while continuing to rehearse at Hurtwood Edge, all four band members participated in London sessions for Dr. John's album The Sun, Moon & Herbs (1971).

=== UK summer tour ===
Early in the summer of 1970, Clapton asked a former Apple Records acquaintance to find accommodation for Whitlock, Gordon and Radle in central London, telling him that they were "going bonkers" out in the Surrey countryside. The band then moved into a two-storey flat at 33 Thurloe Place, close to South Kensington tube station. The flat also served as a meeting place for Clapton and Boyd, who found herself flattered by Clapton's attention in light of her husband's infidelities, and his preoccupation with Eastern spirituality. In his autobiography, Clapton wrote that he was both inspired and "tormented" by his feelings for Boyd, which he channelled into his music, beginning with a UK tour by Derek and the Dominos.

For three weeks from 1 August, the group performed in clubs and other small venues in Britain, where Clapton chose to play anonymously, still weary from the fame that he felt had plagued Cream and Blind Faith. Admission for the shows was set at £1, and clauses in the contract with each venue stipulated that Clapton's name was not to be used as a crowd-puller. Shapiro writes that the band had "made great strides" since the Lyceum concert; their set list included "Tell the Truth", covers of Billy Myles' "Have You Ever Loved a Woman" and Jimi Hendrix's "Little Wing", and songs such as "Bottle of Red Wine" and "Don't Know Why", both from the Eric Clapton album. Clapton has said of this UK tour, "no one knew who we were, and I loved it. I loved the fact that we were this little quartet, playing in obscure places, sometimes to audiences of no more than fifty or sixty people."

=== Layla sessions ===
The band flew to Miami, Florida, on 23 August 1970 to begin recording with Atlantic Records producer Tom Dowd. Until early September, sessions took place at Criteria Studios for what became the double album Layla and Other Assorted Love Songs. Most of the material, particularly the track "Layla", was inspired by Clapton's unrequited love for Boyd. After Clapton and Whitlock's initial experimentation with heroin while recording All Things Must Pass, the band's time in Miami was marked by all four members' excessive use of hard drugs. According to Clapton, "We were staying in this hotel on the beach, and whatever drug you wanted, you could get it at the newsstand. The girl would just take your orders."

The first few days of the Layla sessions were unproductive. On 26 August, Dowd, who was also producing the Allman Brothers Band's album Idlewild South, took the Dominos to an Allman Brothers concert, where Clapton, already a fan of the rising lead and slide guitarist Duane Allman, first heard him play in person. After Clapton invited the whole band back to Criteria that night, he and Allman formed an instant bond that provided the catalyst for the Layla album. Over ten recording dates, Allman contributed to most of the tracks on the album, in between his commitments to the Allman Brothers Band. Only three songs, recorded before his arrival – "I Looked Away", "Bell Bottom Blues" and "Keep on Growing" – lacked his participation. The band remade "Tell the Truth" during the sessions and subsequently attempted to have the Spector-produced single cancelled. In the United States, Atco Records released the original version of "Tell the Truth" backed with "Roll It Over" in September, but soon withdrew the single.

Clapton has described Allman as "the musical brother that I never had, but wished I did". Allman's slide guitar playing elevated the album's blues covers, which included "Nobody Knows You When You're Down and Out" (by Jimmy Cox), "Have You Ever Loved a Woman" (the Billy Myles song, originally recorded by Freddie King) and "Key to the Highway" (Big Bill Broonzy). Clapton invited him to become a member of Derek and the Dominos, but Allman demurred, choosing to remain loyal to his own band. According to Whitlock, however, as an addition to the band in concert, Allman was "a hired gun" and an "unnecessary" addition; Whitlock added, "He played with us twice, and it was not good both times he played, because he was not a fluid player ... He could play parts, but he couldn't sing with his guitar." The jams from Allman's first night at Criteria with the Dominos were issued on the second CD of The Layla Sessions: 20th Anniversary Edition in 1990.

The album's best-known track, "Layla", was compiled from recordings from two separate sessions. The main, guitar-oriented section was taped on 9 September, after the band had recorded their version of Hendrix's "Little Wing"; the closing section was added several weeks later, after Clapton had decided that the song lacked a suitable ending. The answer was an elegiac piano piece composed by Gordon (and an uncredited Rita Coolidge) and played by the drummer, with Whitlock providing a second piano part to cover Gordon's relative inexperience on the instrument. During the Layla sessions, Gordon had been writing and playing songs for an intended solo album when, by chance, Clapton first heard the piano piece. According to Clapton's recollection, in return for continuing to use the Dominos' studio time for his own project, Gordon agreed to have the segment used as the ending for "Layla".

=== October–December 1970 live shows ===
After the recording of Layla and Other Assorted Love Songs, the four-piece Derek and the Dominos returned to the UK to continue touring there before heading back to America to start the US tour on 15 October. Allman performed two shows with the group near the end of the US tour: at Curtis Hixon Hall, in Tampa, Florida, on 1 December, and at the Onondaga County War Memorial in Syracuse, New York, the following night.

Whitlock recalled of their drug consumption during the tour: "We didn't have little bits of anything. There were no grams around, let's just put it like that. Tom couldn't believe it, the way we had these big bags laying out everywhere. I'm almost ashamed to tell it, but it's the truth. It was scary, what we were doing, but we were just young and dumb and didn't know. Cocaine and heroin, that's all and Johnny Walker." Elton John, who opened for them, said that despite the reports of drugs and booze, "They were phenomenal. From the side of the stage, I took mental notes of their performance ... it was their keyboard player Bobby Whitlock that I watched like a hawk ... You watched and you learned, from people that had more experience than you." In 1973, a live double album, titled In Concert, was released, culled from the band's October 1970 shows at the Fillmore East in New York City. Six of the recordings from that album were digitally remastered, remixed and expanded with additional material from the same shows to become Live at the Fillmore, released in 1994.

=== Album release ===
Layla and Other Assorted Love Songs was issued in November 1970. According to Shapiro, relative to the band and Dowd's high expectations, it was a "critical and commercial flop". Clapton similarly describes Layla as having "died a death" on release. Although it received favourable reviews in Rolling Stone and The Village Voice, the album missed the top ten in the United States and failed to chart at all in the United Kingdom, until a reissue on CD resulted in a one-week stay at number 68 in 2011. It garnered little attention, partly as a result of a lack of promotion by Polydor, and partly due to the public's ignorance of Clapton's presence in the band. Dowd said that he "felt it was the best album I'd been involved with since The Genius of Ray Charles" and was disappointed at the lack of acclaim it initially received.

"Layla" was included on The History of Eric Clapton in 1972, and Atlantic issued the song as a single in July that year. It became a hit, reaching number 10 in America and number 7 in Britain. The success of the title track in 1972 led to a reappraisal of Layla and Other Assorted Love Songs. It has since received widespread critical acclaim and has been ranked among the best albums of all time by VH1 (at number 89) and Rolling Stone (number 115). Layla is considered one of Clapton's most outstanding achievements.

=== Johnny Cash Show appearance ===
The band appeared on The Johnny Cash Show, in their only television appearance. Filmed at the Ryman Auditorium in Nashville, Tennessee, and broadcast on 6 January 1971, the band performed "It's Too Late" and then joined Cash and Carl Perkins to play Perkins' "Matchbox".

=== Tragedy and dissolution ===
Tragedy and misfortune dogged the group throughout and following its brief career. In September 1970, Clapton was devastated by the death of his friend and professional rival Jimi Hendrix; having just recorded a version of "Little Wing" in Miami, the Dominos included the track on Layla as a tribute to Hendrix. In October 1971, Duane Allman was killed in a motorcycle accident. Clapton later wrote in his autobiography that he and Allman had been inseparable during the sessions at Criteria. In addition, Clapton took the lukewarm critical and commercial reception to Layla personally, which accelerated his spiral into drug addiction and depression. In 1985 when talking about the band, Clapton said:

We were a make-believe band. We were all hiding inside it. Derek and the Dominos – the whole thing. So it couldn't last. I had to come out and admit that I was being me. I mean, being Derek was a cover for the fact that I was trying to steal someone else's wife. That was one of the reasons for doing it, so that I could write the song, and even use another name for Pattie. So Derek and Layla – it wasn't real at all.

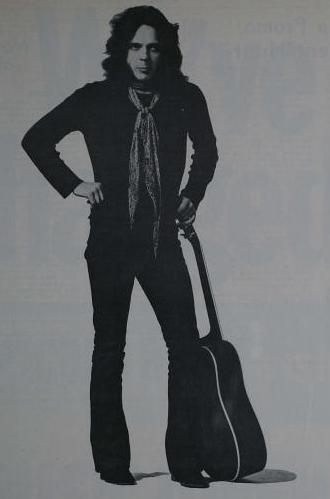
Bobby Whitlock in 1972

In February 1971, Radle and Gordon participated in sessions, produced by Spector and Harrison, for a planned solo album by Ronnie Spector. Later that year, the Dominos, heavily impacted by hard drug use, disbanded acrimoniously in London, just before they could complete their second LP. In a subsequent interview with music critic Robert Palmer, Clapton said the second album "broke down halfway through because of the paranoia and tension. And the band just dissolved." After the dissolution, Clapton turned away from touring and recording to nurse an intense heroin addiction. This three-year career hiatus was interrupted only by his participation in Harrison's Concert for Bangladesh shows in August 1971, along with a large cast of musicians, including Leon Russell, Keltner and Radle; a guest appearance at Russell's December 1971 show at London's Rainbow Theatre; and his own Rainbow Concert, in January 1973. The latter event was organised by Pete Townshend of The Who to help Clapton kick his drug habit and build momentum for his return. Whitlock signed with the US record label ABC-Dunhill, for which he recorded the albums Bobby Whitlock and Raw Velvet. Both albums were released in 1972 and included contributions from all the Dominos (recorded in early 1971), along with Harrison, the Bramletts, Keltner, and the former Delaney & Bonnie horn section.

Following Clapton's return as a solo artist in 1974, he and Radle worked together until 1979, when Clapton abruptly dismissed him from his band. Radle died in June 1980 of complications from a kidney infection associated with alcohol and drug use. Whitlock and Clapton did not work together again until 2000, when they performed on Jools Holland's BBC show Later... with Jools Holland. In 1983, Gordon, who had undiagnosed schizophrenia at the time, killed his mother with a hammer during a psychotic episode. He was confined to a mental institution in 1984, until his death in 2023. Recordings from the 1971 sessions for the band's cancelled second album were included on Clapton's four-CD/cassette box set Crossroads, released in 1988.

Bobby Whitlock died after a brief illness at his home in Texas, on August 10, 2025, at the age of 77. It meant that Eric Clapton was the sole surviving member of the band.

== Band members ==
Official line-up

- Eric Clapton – vocals, guitars (1970–1971)
- Bobby Whitlock – organ, piano, vocals (1970–1971; died 2025)
- Carl Radle – bass guitar (1970–1971; died 1980)
- Jim Gordon – drums, percussion (1970–1971; died 2023)

Occasional members

- Dave Mason – guitar (1970; died 2026)
- Duane Allman – guitar (1970; died 1971)

== Discography ==
Pre-album single

- "Tell the Truth" / "Roll It Over" (September 1970)

Recorded during the sessions for George Harrison's 1970 triple album All Things Must Pass; produced by Phil Spector but pulled by Clapton, stating it didn't reflect their sound. "Tell the Truth" was later re-recorded for the band's debut album, but "Roll It Over" was only performed live. Harrison and Dave Mason contributed guitar to "Roll It Over". Both tracks were included on the 2011 reissue of Layla.

Layla and Other Assorted Love Songs

- Debut album Layla and Other Assorted Love Songs recorded during September 1970, released on 9 November. Billboard 200 # 16
- In 1990 a new mix was released as The Layla Sessions: 20th Anniversary Edition with unreleased tracks and jams. Billboard 200 # 157
- The original version was reissued in 2011 as the 40th Anniversary Edition with other unreleased tracks.
- several other reissues

Singles

- "Bell Bottom Blues" / "Keep on Growing" (1971) Billboard Hot 100 # 91
- "Layla" / "I Am Yours" (1971) Billboard Hot 100 # 51
- "Layla" / "Bell Bottom Blues" (1972) Billboard Hot 100 # 10
- "Why Does Love Got to Be So Sad?" / "Presence of the Lord" (1973) Bubbling Under Hot 100 # 120

Other songs recorded during Layla sessions

- Tell the truth Jam (released on "The History of Eric Clapton" in 1972)
- "Got to Get Better in a Little While" (wasn't completed but was played live. The incomplete version with only Clapton's verse vocals was released on Clapton's Crossroads box set, credited as a '71 Olympic Studios track. The 40th deluxe edition of Layla features a version with chorus vocals performed by Whitlock in 2010 mixed into the original take.)
- "Mean Old World" (T-Bone Walker cover, released on Crossroads, The Layla Sessions and the 40th deluxe edition).
- "(When Things Go Wrong) It Hurts Me Too" and "Tender Love" (Short jams officially released on The Layla Sessions).
- various untitled jams (five were released on The Layla Sessions).

Live recordings

- In Concert (1973), Billboard 200 # 20, and Live at the Fillmore (1994)

Live recordings of the concerts at the Fillmore East on 23 and 24 October 1970 were released on those two live albums (some of the recordings are present on both albums).

- live at the Johnny Cash Show recorded on 5 November 1970.
1. "It's Too Late"
2. "Got to Get Better in a Little While"
3. "Matchbox" (Carl Perkins cover played with Cash and Clapton)
4. "Blues Power"

The band's performance aired on 6 January 1971. This is the only known professional video performance of the band. It was officially released as part of the 40th anniversary edition of their debut album.

Sessions for the second album, Olympic Studios, April and May 1971
All available in bootlegs. Some were officially released on the Crossroads box set and the Layla album's 40th anniversary deluxe edition.

- "Gold Devils Roads" (recorded at Clapton's home in March, features vocals by Gordon's wife, Renée Armand)
- "One More Chance" (officially released)
- "Mean Old Frisco" (officially released)
- "High" (instrumental officially released on the Clapton "12 Bars" documentary soundtrack)
- "Snake Lake Blues" (officially released)
- "Evil" (Willie Dixon cover, officially released)
- "Son of Apache"
- "Moody Jam"
- "Chocolate"
- "I've Been All Day"
- "Got to Get Better in a Little While" (new jam version, officially released)
- "Sick at Heart"
- "Is My Love"
- "It's Hard to Find a Friend", "Will I See You Again" and "Yes, I Love You" (Jim Gordon original songs)

== General sources ==
- Boyd, Pattie; with Junor, Penny (2007). Wonderful Today: The Autobiography. London: Headline Review. ISBN 978-0-7553-1646-5.
- Clapton, Eric; with Sykes, Christopher Simon (2007). Eric Clapton: The Autobiography. London: Century. ISBN 978-1-8460-5309-2.
- Clayson, Alan (2003). George Harrison. London: Sanctuary. ISBN 1-86074-489-3.
- Harris, John (July 2001). "A Quiet Storm". Mojo. pp. 66–74.
- Madinger, Chip; Easter, Mark (2000). Eight Arms to Hold You: The Solo Beatles Compendium. Chesterfield, MO: 44.1 Productions. ISBN 0-615-11724-4.
- The New Rolling Stone Encyclopedia of Rock & Roll (1995). New York: Fireside/Rolling Stone Press. ISBN 0-684-81044-1.
- O'Dell, Chris; with Ketcham, Katherine (2009). Miss O'Dell: My Hard Days and Long Nights with The Beatles, The Stones, Bob Dylan, Eric Clapton, and the Women They Loved. New York: Touchstone. ISBN 978-1-4165-9093-4.
- Reid, Jan (2006). Layla and Other Assorted Love Songs by Derek and the Dominos. New York: Rodale. ISBN 978-1-59486-369-1.
- Sandford, Christopher (1999). Clapton: Edge of Darkness. New York: Da Capo Press. ISBN 0-306-80897-8.
- Santoro, Gene (1995). Dancing in Your Head: Jazz, Blues, Rock, and Beyond. New York: Oxford University Press. ISBN 0-19-510123-5.
- Schumacher, Michael (1995). Crossroads: The Life and Music of Eric Clapton. New York: Hyperion. ISBN 0-7868-6074-X.
- Shapiro, Harry (1992). Eric Clapton: Lost in the Blues. New York: Da Capo Press. ISBN 0-306-80480-8.
- Whitlock, Bobby; with Roberty, Marc (2010). Bobby Whitlock: A Rock 'n' Roll Autobiography. Jefferson, NC: McFarland. ISBN 978-0-7864-6190-5.
