= The Best of Delaney & Bonnie =

Compilation album by Delaney & Bonnie and Friends
- Released: 1972 (original release), 1990 (revised edition)
- Recorded: 1969–1971
- Length: 40:50 (original version); 67:10 (expanded edition)
- Labels: Atco, Rhino
- Producers: various; see track listing for details

Delaney & Bonnie and Friends chronology
D&B Together (1972)	The Best of Delaney & Bonnie (1972)

Cover of 1990 Revised Edition

Professional ratings
Review scores
Source	Rating
Christgau's Record Guide	A

The Best of Delaney & Bonnie is a compilation album of music recorded by Delaney & Bonnie and Friends during the years 1969–71.

The album is available in two editions. The first edition, released in 1972 by Atco (Atlantic) Records (catalog no. SD 7014, out of print) contains songs from Delaney and Bonnie's four albums on the Atco and Elektra labels. The second, revised & expanded edition was released in 1990 on Atlantic's affiliate Rhino Records, and contains songs from all six of the band's original albums.

== Track listings ==
=== Original 1972 release (LP) ===
1. "When the Battle Is Over" (Mac Rebennack, Jessie Hill) – 3:32
2. "Dirty Old Man" (Delaney Bramlett, Mac Davis) – 2:31
  - [1, 2] from Accept No Substitute - The Original Delaney & Bonnie (1969). Produced by David Anderle, assisted by Delaney Bramlett.
3. "Only You Know and I Know (live version)" (Dave Mason) – 4:10
  - From On Tour with Eric Clapton (1970). Produced by Jimmy Miller and Delaney Bramlett.
4. "Get Ourselves Together" (Bonnie Bramlett, Carl Radle) – 2:25
  - From Accept No Substitute.
5. "Where There's a Will There's a Way" (Bonnie Bramlett, Bobby Whitlock) – 4:57
  - From On Tour with Eric Clapton.
6. "Never Ending Song of Love" (Delaney Bramlett) – 3:20
  - From Motel Shot (1971). Produced by Delaney Bramlett.
7. "Comin' Home (live version)" (Bonnie Bramlett, Eric Clapton) – 5:30
  - From On Tour with Eric Clapton.
8. "The Love of My Man" (Ed Townsend) – 4:28
9. "Soul Shake" (Margaret Lewis, Myrna Smith) – 3:10
10. Medley: "Come On In My Kitchen" (Robert Johnson)/"Mama, He Treats Your Daughter Mean" (Herbert Lance, Charles Singleton, John Wallace)/"Goin' Down the Road Feelin' Bad" (Traditional, arr. Delaney Bramlett) – 4:10
11. "Free the People" (Barbara Keith) – 2:47
  - [8–11] from To Bonnie from Delaney (1970). Produced by Jerry Wexler, Tom Dowd and Delaney Bramlett, assisted by Curtis Ousley.

=== 1990 revised/expanded edition (CD) ===
1. "Get Ourselves Together" (Bonnie Bramlett, Carl Radle) – 2:25
2. "When the Battle Is Over" (Mac Rebennack, Jessie Hill) – 3:32
3. "Ghetto" (Bettye Crutcher/Homer Banks, Bonnie Bramlett) – 4:55
  - [1–3] from Accept No Substitute.
4. "Piece of My Heart" (Bert Berns, Jerry Ragovoy) – 4:38
  - From Home (1969). Produced by Don Nix and Donald "Duck" Dunn.
5. "Comin' Home (studio version)" (Bonnie Bramlett, Eric Clapton) – 3:13
6. "Groupie (Superstar)" (Bonnie Bramlett, Leon Russell) – 2:49
  - [5, 6] from Atco single #6725 (1969); subsequently included in D&B Together (1972). Produced by Delaney Bramlett.
7. "Things Get Better (live version)" (Steve Cropper, Eddie Floyd, Wayne Jackson) – 4:20
8. "Where There's a Will There's a Way" (Bonnie Bramlett, Bobby Whitlock) – 4:57
9. "That's What My Man Is For" (Bessie Griffin) – 4:41
10. "I Don't Want to Discuss It" (Beth Beatty, Dick Cooper, Ernie Shelby) – 4:55
  - [7–10] from On Tour with Eric Clapton.
11. "Soul Shake" (Margaret Lewis, Myrna Smith) – 3:10
12. "Free the People" (Barbara Keith) – 2:47
13. "The Love of My Man" (Ed Townsend) – 4:28
  - [11–13] from To Bonnie from Delaney.
14. "Will the Circle Be Unbroken" (A.P. Carter) – 2:42
15. "Never Ending Song of Love" (Delaney Bramlett) – 3:20
16. "Goin' Down the Road Feelin' Bad" (Traditional, arr. Delaney Bramlett) – 5:12
  - [14–16] from Motel Shot.
17. "Only You Know and I Know (studio version)" (Dave Mason) – 3:26
  - Recorded 1969, and originally issued on Atco single #6851 (1971); subsequently included in D&B Together. Produced by Delaney Bramlett.
18. "Move 'Em Out" (Steve Cropper, Bettye Crutcher) – 2:50
  - Recorded 1971, and originally issued on Atco single #6866 (1972); subsequently included in D&B Together. Produced by Delaney Bramlett.
