= Raw Velvet =

Studio album by Bobby Whitlock
- Released: November 1972
- Recorded: 1971
- Genre: Rock
- Label: ABC-Dunhill (US)
- Producers: Jimmy Miller; Joe Zagarino; Andy Johns and Bobby Whitlock on "Hello L.A., Bye Bye Birmingham"

Bobby Whitlock chronology
Bobby Whitlock (1972)	Raw Velvet (1972)	One of a Kind (1975)

Professional ratings
Review scores
Source	Rating
AllMusic	3/5 stars

Raw Velvet is the second solo album by American songwriter and musician Bobby Whitlock, released in 1972. The appearance of Eric Clapton, Carl Radle and Jim Gordon of Derek and the Dominos was only indicated by the representation of 'dominoes' on the original inner sleeve.

== Track listing ==
All songs written by Bobby Whitlock, except where noted

=== Side one – Raw ===
1. "Tell the Truth" (Eric Clapton, Bobby Whitlock) – 3:50
2. "Bustin' My Ass" – 3:35
3. "Write You a Letter" – 2:28
4. "Ease Your Pain" (Hoyt Axton) – 3:04
5. "If You Ever" – 3:19
6. "Hello L.A., Bye Bye Birmingham" (Delaney Bramlett, Mac Davis) – 3:52 produced by Andy Johns and Bobby Whitlock

=== Side two – Velvet ===
1. "You Came Along" – 3:04
2. "Think About It" – 3:09
3. "Satisfied" – 3:00
4. "Dearest I Wonder" (Bobby Whitlock, Paula Boyd) – 3:50
5. "Start All Over" – 3:25

== Personnel ==
- Bobby Whitlock – rhythm guitar, keyboards, vocals
- Eric Clapton – guitar (uncredited on "Hello L.A., Bye Bye Birmingham"), bass guitar ("Hello L.A., Bye Bye Birmingham")
- Keith Ellis – bass guitar
- Rick Vito – lead guitar
- Don Poncher – drums
- Jim Gordon – drums on "Hello L.A., Bye Bye Birmingham"
- George Harrison – guitar
- Jim Price – trumpet
- Bobby Keys – saxophone

Technical

- Anthony Fawcett – London coordinator
- John Kosh – design concept
- Ruby Mazur – design
- Peter Howe – photography
