= On Tour with Eric Clapton =

Live album by Delaney & Bonnie & Friends
- Released: March 1970
- Recorded: December 7, 1969
- Venues: Fairfield Halls, Croydon, England
- Genres: Southern rock; country; blues; gospel; R&B
- Length: 42:35 (incl. stage announcements and crowd noise)
- Label: Atco
- Producers: Jimmy Miller, Delaney Bramlett

Delaney & Bonnie & Friends chronology
The Original Delaney & Bonnie & Friends (1969)	On Tour with Eric Clapton (1970)	To Bonnie from Delaney (1970)

Eric Clapton chronology
Blind Faith (1969)	On Tour with Eric Clapton (1970)	Eric Clapton (1970)

On Tour with Eric Clapton is a 1970 album by Delaney & Bonnie with Eric Clapton, recorded live at the Fairfield Halls, England. Released on Atco Records, it peaked at No. 29 on the Billboard 200 in April 1970, at No. 39 on the UK Albums Chart, and was certified a gold record by the RIAA.

== Content and reissue ==
The album features Delaney and Bonnie's best-known touring band, including Eric Clapton, Jim Gordon, Carl Radle, Bobby Whitlock, and Dave Mason. Many of the players on this album went on to work with George Harrison on his post-Beatles debut album All Things Must Pass and with Clapton on his solo debut. The horn players Bobby Keys and Jim Price played on the albums Sticky Fingers and Exile on Main St. by the Rolling Stones, and join them for their 1972 STP Tour. Whitlock, Radle, and Gordon formed with Clapton his band Derek and the Dominos for Layla and Other Assorted Love Songs.

The album was recorded during the band's tour of the U.K. in December 1969. I Don't Want To Discuss It was recorded at the Royal Albert Hall on December 1. Where There's A Will There's A Way was recorded at Fairfield Halls in Croydon at the early show on December 7. The bulk of the album (Things Get Better, Medley: Poor Elijah / Tribute To Johnson, Only You Know And I Know, That's what My Man Is For, Coming Home, and the Little Richard Medley) was recorded at the late show that same day at Fairfield Halls. Overdubs were added later.

As no pictures of Delaney and Bonnie were deemed good enough for the album cover, a photo was used instead of a Rolls-Royce Silver Dawn in a desert, reportedly taken by manager Barry Feinstein while working as a photographer covering a Bob Dylan tour in 1966. Dylan's feet are those hanging from the car window.

On Tour was re-issued in 2010 as four-disc box set, packaged in a mock road case containing the complete performance from the Royal Albert Hall, plus a composite of the next night's performances at Colston Hall in Bristol, and both the early and late shows from the tour's final stop at Fairfield Halls in Croydon. George Harrison played slide guitar on the English leg of the tour that followed the Albert Hall performance, as well as in Scandinavia, which are represented on discs 2–4.

== Reception ==
Professional ratings
Review scores
Source	Rating
AllMusic	4.5/5 stars
Christgau's Record Guide	A−
MusicHound Rock	4.5/5 stars
Rolling Stone	Positive
The Rolling Stone Album Guide	5/5 stars
The Village Voice	A
The Encyclopedia of Popular Music	4/5 stars
Music Story	4/5 stars
The 1000 Best Pop-Rock Albums	4/5 stars

The album has received highly positive reviews, with many critics suggesting the album is superior to Clapton's prior project, Blind Faith. In the Rolling Stone Album Guide, the album is described as "a triumph", which is attributed to the fact the band was "one of the best" in "rock and roll". Writing for Rolling Stone, Mark Kemp said the album contained "wicked performances of the kind of country and boogie that would define Southern rock". Mojo described the album as "one of the two Rosetta Stones of roots rock'n'roll".

== Track listing ==
Side one

No.	Title	Writer(s)	Length
1.	"Things Get Better"	Steve Cropper, Eddie Floyd, Wayne Jackson	4:20
2.	"Poor Elijah – Tribute to Johnson (medley)"	Delaney Bramlett, Jim Ford, Leon Russell	5:00
3.	"Only You Know and I Know"	Dave Mason	4:10
4.	"I Don't Want to Discuss It"	Beth Beatty, Dick Cooper, Ernie Shelby	4:55

Side two

No.	Title	Writer(s)	Length
1.	"That's What My Man Is For"	Bessie Griffin	4:30
2.	"Where There's A Will There's A Way"	Bonnie Bramlett, Delaney Bramlett, Bobby Whitlock	4:57
3.	"Comin' Home"	Bonnie Bramlett, Delaney Bramlett, Eric Clapton	5:30
4.	"Little Richard Medley – Tutti Frutti/The Girl Can't Help It/Long Tall Sally/Jenny Jenny"	Richard Penniman, Bobby Troup, Robert Blackwell	5:45

== 2010 deluxe edition box set ==
Disc one (Recorded Monday, December 1, 1969, at Royal Albert Hall, London)
No.	Title	Writer(s)	Length
1.	"Intro / Tuning"		0:41
2.	"Opening Jam"		5:00
3.	"Gimme Some Lovin'"	Steve Winwood, Spencer Davis, Muff Winwood	3:50
4.	"Band Introductions"		1:36
5.	"Only You Know and I Know"	Dave Mason	4:35
6.	"Medley: Poor Elijah / Tribute to Johnson"	Delaney Bramlett, Jim Ford, Leon Russell	5:19
7.	"Get Ourselves Together"	Delaney Bramlett, Bonnie Bramlett, Carl Radle	3:01
8.	"I Don't Know Why"	Delaney Bramlett, Bonnie Bramlett, Eric Clapton	5:09
9.	"Where There's a Will, There's a Way"	Delaney Bramlett, Bonnie Bramlett, Bobby Whitlock	4:30
10.	"That's What My Man Is For"	Bessie Griffin	3:44
11.	"Medley: Pour Your Love on Me / Just Plain Beautiful"	Homer Banks, Bonnie Bramlett / Steve Cropper, Bettye Crutcher	9:21
12.	"Everybody Loves a Winner"	Booker T. Jones, William Bell	4:48
13.	"Things Get Better"	Cropper, Eddie Floyd, Wayne Jackson	4:09
14.	"Coming Home"	Delaney Bramlett, Bonnie Bramlett, Clapton	4:49
15.	"I Don't Want to Discuss It"	Beth Beatty, Dick Cooper, Ernie Shelby	5:19
16.	"Little Richard Medley: Tutti Frutti / The Girl Can't Help It / Long Tall Sally / Jenny Jenny"	Richard Penniman, Bobby Troup	8:52
17.	"My Baby Specializes"	Isaac Hayes, David Porter	4:19

Disc two (Recorded Tuesday, December 2, 1969, at Colston Hall, Bristol)
No.	Title	Writer(s)	Length
1.	"Intro / Tuning"		0:39
2.	"Opening Jam"		4:39
3.	"Gimme Some Lovin'"	Steve Winwood, Davis, Muff Winwood	4:10
4.	"Things Get Better"	Cropper, Floyd, Jackson	3:49
5.	"Medley: Poor Elijah / Tribute to Johnson"	Delaney Bramlett, Ford, Russell	5:37
6.	"I Don't Know Why"	Delaney Bramlett, Bonnie Bramlett, Clapton	5:23
7.	"Medley: Pour Your Love on Me / Just Plain Beautiful"	Banks, Bonnie Bramlett / Cropper, Crutcher	8:42
8.	"Where There's a Will, There's a Way"	Delaney Bramlett, Bonnie Bramlett, Whitlock	4:12
9.	"Coming Home"	Delaney Bramlett, Bonnie Bramlett, Clapton	4:50
10.	"Little Richard Medley: Tutti Frutti / The Girl Can't Help It / Long Tall Sally / Jenny Jenny"	Penniman, Troup	7:13
11.	"I Don't Want to Discuss It"	Beatty, Cooper, Shelby	5:19
12.	"Crowd / Announcement"		2:56

Disc three (Recorded Sunday, December 7, 1969, at Fairfield Halls, Croydon [1st show])
No.	Title	Writer(s)	Length
1.	"Intro / Tuning"		0:51
2.	"Gimme Some Lovin'"	Steve Winwood, Spencer Davis, Muff Winwood	4:01
3.	"Introduction"		0:44
4.	"Things Get Better"	Cropper, Floyd, Jackson	4:59
5.	"Medley: Poor Elijah / Tribute to Johnson"	D. Bramlett, Ford, Russell	7:17
6.	"I Don't Know Why"	D. Bramlett, B. Bramlett, Clapton	5:35
7.	"Where There's a Will, There's a Way"	B. Bramlett, D. Bramlett, Whitlock	5:27
8.	"That's What My Man Is For"	Griffin	5:03
9.	"I Don't Want to Discuss It"	Beatty, Cooper, Shelby	5:33
10.	"Coming Home"	B. Bramlett, D. Bramlett, Clapton	7:51

Disc four (Recorded Sunday, December 7, 1969, at Fairfield Halls, Croydon [2nd show])
No.	Title	Writer(s)	Length
1.	"Intro / Tuning"		1:25
2.	"Gimme Some Lovin'"	S. Winwood, Davis, M. Winwood	4:24
3.	"Pigmy"	Mel Brown, Billy Larkin, Henry Swarn	8:51
4.	"Introductions"		1:31
5.	"Things Get Better"	Cropper, Floyd, Jackson	4:50
6.	"Medley: Poor Elijah / Tribute to Johnson"	D. Bramlett, Ford, Russell	5:30
7.	"Only You Know and I Know"	Mason	5:28
8.	"Will the Circle Be Unbroken?"	A. P. Carter	3:54
9.	"Where There's a Will, There's a Way"	B. Bramlett, D. Bramlett, B. Whitlock	5:23
10.	"I Don't Know Why"	D. Bramlett, B. Bramlett, Clapton	5:58
11.	"That's What My Man Is For"	Griffin	4:56
12.	"Coming Home"	B. Bramlett, D. Bramlett, Clapton	7:42
13.	"Little Richard Medley: Tutti Frutti / The Girl Can't Help It / Long Tall Sally / Jenny Jenny"	Penniman, Troup	6:17

== Personnel ==
- Bonnie Bramlett – vocals
- Delaney Bramlett – guitar, vocals
- Eric Clapton – lead guitar, vocals
- Rita Coolidge – backing vocals
- Jim Gordon – drums, percussion
- George Harrison (under the pseudonym L'Angelo Misterioso) – guitar (discs two – four of box set only)
- Tex Johnson – percussion
- Bobby Keys – saxophone
- Dave Mason – guitar
- Carl Radle – bass guitar
- Jim Price – trombone, trumpet
- Bobby Whitlock – organ, vocals

Production personnel

- Jimmy Miller, Delaney Bramlett – producers
- Bill Halverson – mixing
- Andy Johns, Glyn Johns, Tex Johnson – recording engineers
- Jim Price – horn arrangements
- Barry Feinstein – photography
- Tom Wilkes – design, photography

== See also ==
- Layla and Other Assorted Love Songs
- All Things Must Pass
