= D&B Together =

Studio album by Delaney & Bonnie and Friends
- Released: March 1972
- Recorded: 1969, 1971
- Length: 37:21
- Label: Columbia
- Producers: Delaney Bramlett (original album, bonus tracks 1 and 2); Delaney Bramlett/Doug Gilmore (bonus tracks 4 and 6); David Anderle (bonus tracks 3 and 5)

Delaney & Bonnie and Friends chronology
| Motel Shot (1971) | D&B Together (1972) | The Best of Delaney & Bonnie (1972) |

Country Life Cover

Professional ratings
Review scores
| Source | Rating |
|---|---|
| Allmusic | 2/5 stars |

D&B Together (originally titled Country Life) is the sixth and final album by Delaney & Bonnie and Friends and their first for Columbia Records. It was their last album of new material, as Delaney and Bonnie Bramlett would divorce soon after its release.

== Background ==
Country Life, Delaney & Bonnie's sixth album, was anticipated by the artist's label Atco (Atlantic) Records following the success of their previous three albums and of "Never Ending Song of Love," a single from their last album Motel Shot; moreover, Atlantic executive Jerry Wexler had developed a personal friendship with the artists. The album was delivered to Atlantic behind schedule, and was rushed into distribution upon delivery in early 1972 (Atco catalog no. SD 33-383). However, Wexler found the album's quality unsatisfactory and quickly withdrew it from the market. Wexler discovered that Delaney and Bonnie's marriage was under strain, and responded by selling their contract and this album's master tapes to CBS. CBS reordered the running sequence of the album as shown below, and re-released it in March 1972, using different cover art, as D&B Together (Columbia/CBS catalog no. KC 31377).

In 2003, Delaney Bramlett said, "I thought Country Life was a fine piece of work, so did Bonnie. Unfortunately, Jerry Wexler didn't agree."

Guest musicians on the album include Eric Clapton, Leon Russell, Duane Allman, Dave Mason, John Hartford, Billy Preston, Tina Turner and Steve Cropper. The standout tracks (all issued prior to the album's release as singles on Atco/Atlantic) are "Move 'Em Out", "Only You Know and I Know", "Comin' Home" and "Groupie (Superstar)." The last two tracks on this album date back to Delaney and Bonnie's sessions for Eric Clapton in November 1969.

== Track listing ==
1. "Only You Know and I Know" (Dave Mason) – 3:26
2. "Wade in the River of Jordan" (Traditional, arr. Delaney Bramlett) – 2:10
3. "Sound of the City" (Delaney Bramlett, Joe Hicks) – 2:39
4. "Well, Well" (Delaney Bramlett) – 3:03
5. "I Know How It Feels to Be Lonely" (Bonnie Bramlett, Leon Ware) – 3:47
6. "Comin' Home" (Bonnie Bramlett, Eric Clapton) – 3:13
7. "Move 'Em Out" (Steve Cropper, Bettye Crutcher) – 2:50
8. "Big Change Comin'" (Delaney Bramlett) – 3:22
9. "A Good Thing (I'm on Fire)" (Delaney Bramlett, Gordon DeWitty) – 2:13
10. "Groupie (Superstar)" (Bonnie Bramlett, Leon Russell) – 2:49
11. "I Know Something Good About You" (Delaney Bramlett, Joe Hicks) – 4:11
12. "Country Life" (Delaney Bramlett, Bobby Whitlock) – 3:38

A remastered version of the album was released by Columbia/Legacy in 2003. This version of the album, which was compiled with Delaney Bramlett's assistance, contains six additional tracks recorded by Delaney and Bonnie during 1972–73 as solo artists following their breakup. The additional tracks are:

1. Delaney Bramlett "Over and Over" (Delaney Bramlett) – 2:41
2. Delaney Bramlett "I'm Not Your Lover, Just Your Lovee" (Delaney Bramlett, Doug Gilmore) – 4:28
3. Bonnie Bramlett "Good Vibrations" (Gordon DeWitty) – 3:13
4. Delaney Bramlett "Are You a Beatle or a Rolling Stone" (Delaney Bramlett, Doug Gilmore) – 3:22
5. Bonnie Bramlett "(You Don't Know) How Glad I Am" (Jimmy Williams, Larry Harrison) – 3:58
6. Delaney Bramlett "California Rain" (Delaney Bramlett, Doug Gilmore) – 3:52

== Personnel ==
- Delaney Bramlett – guitar, vocals
- Bonnie Bramlett – vocals
- Eric Clapton – guitar, vocals
- Leon Russell – piano, keyboards, vocals
- Duane Allman – guitar, vocals
- Dave Mason – guitar, vocals
- Carl Radle – bass guitar, vocals
- John Hartford – banjo, vocals
- Steve Cropper – guitar, vocals
- Jim Gordon – drums, vocals
- Red Rhodes – steel guitar, vocals
- Jaimoe – drums, vocals
- Billy Preston – keyboards, piano, vocals
- Charlie Freeman – guitar, vocals
- Kenny Gradney – bass guitar, vocals
- Bobby Whitlock – keyboards, vocals
- Bobby Keys – saxophone, vocals
- James Jamerson – bass guitar, vocals
- Jerry Jumonville – saxophone, vocals
- King Curtis – saxophone, vocals
- Larry Knechtel – bass guitar, vocals
- Darrell Leonard – trumpet, vocals
- Jim Price – horns, vocals
- Chuck Rainey – bass guitar, vocals
- Larry Savoie – trombone, vocals
- Rita Coolidge – vocals
- Tina Turner – vocals
- Venetta Fields – vocals
- Merry Clayton – vocals
- Eddie Kendricks – vocals
- Sam Clayton – vocals
- Joe Hicks – vocals
- Patrice Holloway – vocals
- Tex Johnson – vocals
- Clydie King – vocals
- Sherlie Matthews – vocals
- Gordon De Witty – vocals
- Jay York – vocals

== Production ==
- Producer: David Anderle/Doug Gilmore/Delaney Bramlett
- Recording Engineer: Tom Dowd/James Greene
- Art Direction: Howard Fritzson
- Photography: David Gahr/Beverly Parker/Sandy Speiser
- Liner Notes (2003 remastered edition): Greg Martin
