= To Bonnie from Delaney =

Studio album by Delaney & Bonnie
- Released: September 1970
- Recorded: 1970
- Studio: Criteria Studios, Miami, FL
- Genre: Soul; blues rock
- Length: 42:18
- Label: Atco
- Producer: Jerry Wexler, Tom Dowd, Delaney Bramlett; assisted by King Curtis

Delaney & Bonnie chronology
On Tour with Eric Clapton (1970)	To Bonnie from Delaney (1970)	Motel Shot (1971)

To Bonnie from Delaney is the fourth album by Delaney & Bonnie and Friends. It was their first studio album for the Atco/Atlantic label (catalog no. SD 33-341), and their fourth album overall. Coincidentally, Atco/Atlantic's parent company purchased the Bramletts' previous label Elektra Records around this time.

The album peaked at #58 on the Billboard album chart in October 1970, with a single from the album released around that same time, "Soul Shake", also charting. Several of the album's songs ("Living on the Open Road", "The Love of My Man", "Alone Together" and "Going Down the Road Feeling Bad") became staples of Delaney and Bonnie's live shows and remained so until their breakup in 1972.

The "Friends" listed on the album include Duane Allman, Little Richard, King Curtis and Sneaky Pete Kleinow.

Professional ratings
Review scores
Source	Rating
Allmusic	link
Christgau's Record Guide	A−

== Track listing ==
1. "Hard Luck and Troubles" (Delaney Bramlett) – 2:35
2. "God Knows I Love You" (Delaney Bramlett, Mac Davis) – 2:46
3. "Lay Down My Burden" (Steve Bogard, Michael Utley) – 3:35
4. Medley: "Come On in My Kitchen" (Robert Johnson)/"Mama, He Treats Your Daughter Mean" (Herbert Lance, Johnny Wallace)/"Going Down the Road Feeling Bad" (Traditional; arranged by Delaney Bramlett) – 4:10
5. "The Love of My Man" (Ed Townsend) – 4:28
6. "They Call It Rock and Roll Music" (Delaney Bramlett) – 3:33
7. "Soul Shake" (Margaret Lewis, Mira Smith) – 3:10
8. "Miss Ann" (Richard Penniman, Enotris Johnson) – 5:01
9. "Alone Together" (Delaney Bramlett, Bonnie Bramlett, Bobby Whitlock) – 3:13
10. "Living on the Open Road" (Delaney Bramlett) – 3:02
11. "Let Me Be Your Man" (George Soulé, Terry Woodford) – 3:20
12. "Free the People" (Barbara Keith) – 2:47

== Personnel ==
- Delaney Bramlett – guitar, vocals
- Bonnie Bramlett – vocals
- Duane Allman – guitar (Tracks 4,7, and 10)
- Mike Utley – piano
- Jim Gordon – keyboards
- Sneaky Pete Kleinow – steel guitar
- Little Richard – piano
- Jim Dickinson – piano
- Charlie Freeman – guitar
- Ben Benay – guitar
- Kenny Gradney – bass guitar
- Bobby Whitlock – piano
- Ron Tutt – drums
- Sammy Creason – drums
- Jerry Jumonville – alto saxophone
- King Curtis – tenor saxophone
- Darrell Leonard – trumpet, trombone
- Sam Clayton – congas
- Wayne Jackson – trumpet
- Jack Hale – trombone, trumpet
- Alan Estes – conga, percussion
- Jerry Scheff – bass guitar
- Tommy McClure – bass guitar
- Ed Logan – tenor saxophone
- Andrew Love – saxophone
- Frank Mayes – tenor saxophone
- Floyd Newman – baritone saxophone

== Production ==
- Producer: Tom Dowd
- Recording engineer: Tom Dowd, Ron Albert, Chuck Kirkpatrick, Don Casale
- Art direction: n/a
- Photography: Tom Wilkes, Barry Feinstein
- Liner notes: n/a
