= Bonnie Bramlett =

American singer (born 1944)

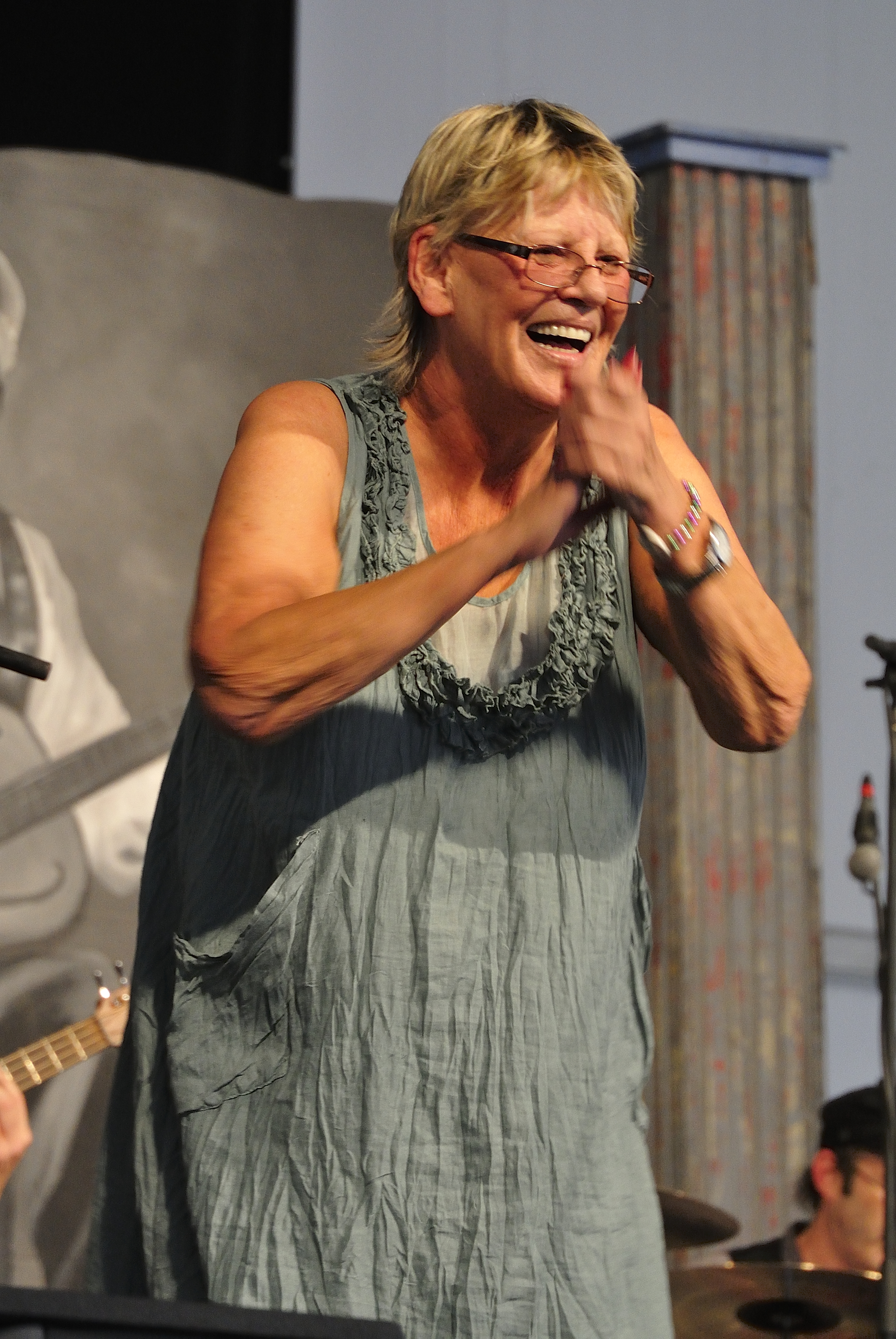
- Bramlett at the 2012 New Orleans Jazz & Heritage Festival

Background information
- Also known as: Bonnie Sheridan
- Born: Bonnie Lynn O'Farrell; November 8, 1944 (age 81); Granite City, Illinois, U.S.
- Occupation: Singer
- Years active: 1965–present
- Website: bonniebramlett.com

Bonnie Bramlett (born Bonnie Lynn O'Farrell, November 8, 1944) is an American singer and occasional actress known for performing with her husband, Delaney Bramlett, as Delaney & Bonnie. She continues to sing as a solo artist.

== Life and career ==
=== Early life ===
Bonnie O'Farrell was born in Granite City, Illinois, the daughter of a steelworker. When she was young her parents divorced and remarried other spouses. She was raised with an extended family that included four half-and step-siblings. She began singing as a child. When she was five years old, she sang "Beautiful Golden Harbor" at the family church in Granite City. Bonnie started her musical career at the age of fifteen singing around St. Louis. She performed as a backup singer for blues musicians such as Albert King and Little Milton, and R&B singer Fontella Bass.

Bonnie was inspired by Tina Turner to pursue a singing career. In her teens, she saw Ike & Tina Turner perform at a club in nearby East St. Louis. Bonnie became the first white Ikette in the Ike & Tina Turner Revue. She filled in for Ikette Jessie Smith who had briefly quit after her boyfriend, Sam Rhodes, a bassist in the Kings of Rhythm was fired. Bramlett recalled: "Jessie left when Sam left and they needed an Ikette. I was there so I went with them. For three days. I was 17 and I was white and my mother wouldn't let me stay any longer than that. I could only help them out, she said. So I just put on a dark wig because I'm blonde and Man Tan because I'm white and helped them out."

=== Delaney & Bonnie ===
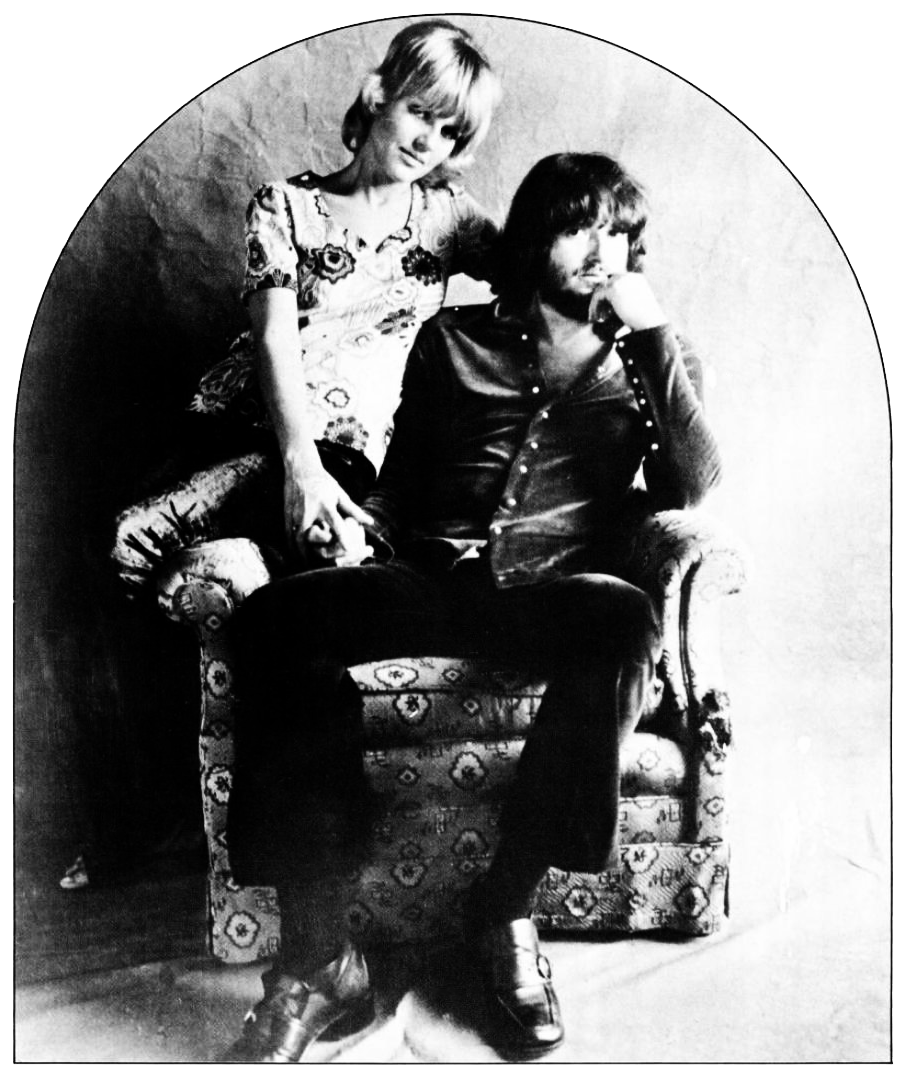
Delaney & Bonnie in 1970, during the making of their album To Bonnie from Delaney

Eventually Bramlett moved to Los Angeles to escape abuse by her father and stepfather. In 1967, she met musician Delaney Bramlett (1939–2008), performing at the opening of a bowling alley with the "Shindogs", the house band of the television show Shindig!. They were married a week later. The duo signed with Stax Records and became known as Delaney & Bonnie. They soon toured Europe with the British rock guitarist Eric Clapton. With frequent drop-in performances by other noted musicians like Duane Allman, George Harrison, and Dave Mason, the group became known as Delaney & Bonnie & Friends. Their album On Tour with Eric Clapton (1970) reached #29 on the Billboard 200. Between 1970 and 1972, the duo had seven songs chart on the Billboard Hot 100, including their best-known single "Never Ending Song of Love" which peaked at #13 and a cover of Dave Mason's "Only You Know and I Know" which peaked at #20.

With Leon Russell, Delaney and Bonnie co-wrote "Superstar", popularized by the Carpenters, and with Eric Clapton, Bonnie wrote the classic "Let It Rain", which is included on Clapton's eponymous first album. The song '"Superstar'" was originally written by Bonnie Bramlett and Rita Coolidge as detailed in the autobiography Delta Lady by Rita Coolidge and Michael Walker. Eric Clapton added some embellishments to the music.

In 1969, The Rolling Stones originally asked Bonnie to sing a duet with Mick Jagger on their song "Gimme Shelter", but Delaney refused to let her perform with the Stones. The Stones then asked soul and gospel singer Merry Clayton to sing on the track. It remains the most prominent contribution to a Rolling Stones track by a female vocalist. According to Bonnie, just before a concert tour in 1970, the duo's band abruptly quit. However, Delaney claims it was Bonnie who didn't show up for the tour.

Bonnie and Delaney Bramlett had small roles in the 1971 film Vanishing Point and in 1974's Catch My Soul.

Their last album together, D&B Together (1972) released #133 on the Billboard 200. Delaney and Bonnie disbanded, both musically and maritally, in 1972. Bonnie Bramlett continued her career as a solo songwriter and recording artist.

=== Solo career ===
She released her first solo album Sweet Bonnie Bramlett in 1973, recorded with the Average White Band whose name she initially proposed. That album presaged the Disco movement, particularly with the track "Crazy 'Bout My Baby" played heavily in underground dance clubs like the Gallery in New York. The song is featured on Nicky Siano's Legendary The Gallery on Soul Jazz Records. Her second album It's Time peaked at #168 on the Billboard 200 in 1975.

In 1973/74, Bramlett toured the United States and Canada, with her band, The Entertainers, promoting her new album and herself as a single artist. That musical entourage featured: Michael "Papabax" Baxter on the keyboards; Little Moe Mosely on drums; Doc Schwebke on bass; Michael Elliot, Donnie Dacus, and Phillip John Diaz on guitars; Larry Williams, Jimmy Reed and Big John Rayford on saxophones; background singers Carolyn (Brandt) Corlew, Lagatha (Smallwood) Wharton, and Lea Santos; and bandleader, Gabe Flemings, on trumpet.

Bramlett continued to contribute vocals to recordings by other artists, including Little Feat and the Allman Brothers Band.

In 1979, Bramlett travelled to Havana, Cuba, to participate in the historic Havana Jam festival, alongside Stephen Stills, the CBS Jazz All-Stars, the Trio of Doom, Fania All-Stars, Billy Swan, Weather Report, Mike Finnegan, Kris Kristofferson, Rita Coolidge and Billy Joel, plus an array of Cuban artists such as Irakere, Pacho Alonso, Tata Güines and Orquesta Aragón. Her performance appears in Havana Jam '79 a documentary film by Ernesto Juan Castellanos.

While on tour with Stills in 1979, Bramlett punched Elvis Costello in the face at a hotel bar in Columbus, Ohio, after Costello referred to James Brown as a "jive-ass nigger" and Ray Charles a "blind, ignorant nigger." Bramlett having brought his remarks to the attention of the press, Costello apologized at a press conference in New York City a few days later, stating he had been drunk and had been trying to be obnoxious in order to bring the conversation to a swift conclusion. According to Costello, "it became necessary for me to outrage these people with about the most obnoxious and offensive remarks that I could muster."

Bramlett guest-starred in an episode of Fame in 1986.

=== The Bandaloo Doctors and Roseanne ===
After exploring gospel music in the 1980s, Bramlett married Danny Sheridan in 1988 and she changed her professional name to Bonnie Sheridan. He became her manager and produced her next recordings. She fronted their group the Bandaloo Doctors, with their self-proclaimed "revolutionary hard rockin' blues." The group's music attracted the admiration of many Hollywood celebrities. In 1990, Bonnie met Roseanne Barr at a rehab program fund-raiser, and she was soon cast as a semi-regular on the hit ABC series Roseanne. Bramlett (credited as Sheridan) played a co-worker and friend (named Bonnie) of Roseanne Barr's character Roseanne Conner, with Danny Sheridan occasionally writing music and appearing as the character Hank the bass player.

In 1992, the Bandaloo Doctors toured as the opening act for Ringo Starr.

=== Later years ===
Bonnie was cast in the 1991 movie The Doors, playing a bartender. She also appeared in the Andrew Davis film The Guardian (2006), starring Kevin Costner and Ashton Kutcher.

In 2002, Bramlett returned to her musical roots, releasing the album I'm Still the Same. In 2006, she was a backup vocalist for the Southern rock artist Shooter Jennings on his album Electric Rodeo. She declined to accompany him on his ensuing tour. Bramlett later sang "Proud Mary" on the 2009 tribute album for Ike Turner titled Rocket 88: Tribute to Ike Turner.

== Personal life ==
=== Marriage and children ===
In 1967, Bramlett met Delaney Bramlett during a gig performing at the opening of a bowling alley. They were married a week later. Their first daughter, Rebekka was born in 1968. Their marriage was marred by violence due to their cocaine addictions. Bonnie Bramlett told People that they had an abusive relationship: "We fought a lot—heavy-duty physical stuff. It wasn't nice to be around, and I'm sure it wasn't fun to watch." In 1972, she divorced Delaney, leaving him and his mother with her own daughters, Suzanne and Rebekka, and the two daughters Delaney had brought to the marriage, Michelle and Mikkol.

Bramlett later rebuilt her relationship with her daughters. Rebekka became a singer, professionally known as Bekka Bramlett. She joined Fleetwood Mac in 1993 after the departure of Stevie Nicks, and appeared on their album Time.

Bramlett began dating musician Danny Sheridan in 1983. They were married in 1988, but later divorced. She credited Sheridan for saving her from her addictions and her friend Roseanne Barr for giving her work on her show.

=== Drug addiction ===
Bramlett began using cocaine during her marriage to Delaney. After their marriage ended, Bramlett suffered from depression. While visiting her friend Gregg Allman's farmland in Juliette, Georgia, she planned to commit suicide by shooting herself with a shotgun in December 1976. Instead, she thought about her children, shot the gun up in the air, and then called the hospital. She continued to struggle with her addictions to cocaine, pills, and alcohol throughout the decade. In 1982, she underwent more hospital treatment that proved unsuccessful. Eventually, with the help of Danny Sheridan, she joined a 12-step recovery program.

== Discography ==
=== Delaney & Bonnie ===
- Home (Stax, 1969)
- Accept No Substitute, previously entitled The Original Delaney & Bonnie (Elektra, 1969)
- On Tour with Eric Clapton (Atco, 1970)
- To Bonnie from Delaney (Atco, 1970)
- Genesis (GNP Crescendo, 1971)
- Motel Shot (Atco, 1971)
- Country Life (Atco, 1972)
- D&B Together (Columbia, 1972), reissue of Country Life
- The Best of Delaney & Bonnie (Atco, 1972)
- The Best of Delaney & Bonnie (Rhino, 1990)

=== Bonnie Bramlett ===
- Sweet Bonnie Bramlett (Columbia, 1973)
- It's Time (Capricorn, 1975) — peaked at #168 on the Billboard 200
- Lady's Choice (Capricorn, 1976)
- Memories (Capricorn, 1978)
- Step by Step (Refuge/Benson, 1981)
- I'm Still the Same (Audium/Koch, 2002)
- It's Time/Lady's Choice (Raven, 2004), reissue of 2 LPs on 1 CD
- Roots, Blues & Jazz (Zoho Music, 2006)
- Beautiful (Rockin' Camel, 2008)
- Piece of My Heart: The Best of 1969–1978 (Raven, 2008)
- I Can Laugh About It Now (Music Avenue, 2009), reissue of Roots, Blues & Jazz

=== Vocal credits ===
- 1969: Joe Cocker! – Joe Cocker
- 1970: Eric Clapton – Eric Clapton
- 1972: Ambush – Marc Benno
- 1972: Stories We Could Tell – The Everly Brothers
- 1972: No Secrets – Carly Simon
- 1978: Atlanta's Burning Down – Dickey Betts
- 1979: Enlightened Rogues – The Allman Brothers Band
- 1980: Reach for the Sky – The Allman Brothers Band
- 1980: Touch You – Jimmie Hall
- 1982: Night After Night – Steve Cropper
- 1982: Party Line – Powder Blues
- 1983: White Shoes – Emmylou Harris
- 1987: Born To Boogie – Hank Williams Jr.
- 1990: Fire Me Back – Rita Coolidge
- 1992: Love Lessons – Rita Coolidge
- 1998: A Long Way Home – Dwight Yoakam
- 2000: Road Dogs – The Charlie Daniels Band
- 2009: Rocket 88: Tribute To Ike Turner – Mr. Groove Band

=== Instrumental & performance credits ===
- 1970: Motel Shot – Delaney & Bonnie & Friends
- 1972: Some Time in New York City – John & Yoko / Plastic Ono Band with Elephant's Memory and Invisible Strings
- 1975: Anniversary Special Volume One – The Earl Scruggs Revue
- 1976: Happy To Be Alive – T. Talton / B. Stewart / J. Sandlin
- 1978: Atlanta's Burning Down – Dickey Betts & Great Southern
- 2019: Sweet Release – Reese Wynans and Friends

== Filmography ==
- Vanishing Point (1971)
- Catch My Soul (AKA Santa Fe Satan) (1974)
- Fame, episode "Fame and Fortune" (1986)
- The Doors (1991)
- Roseanne (1991–1992)
- The Guardian (2006)
- Roseanne's Nuts, episode "Star Spangled Banner" (2011)
