= Delaney Bramlett =

American musician (1939–2008)

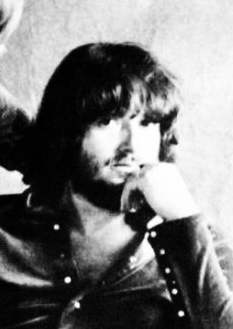
- Bramlett in 1970

Background information
- Born: July 1, 1939; Pontotoc, Mississippi, U.S.
- Died: December 27, 2008 (aged 69) Los Angeles, California, U.S.
- Genres: Blues, rock, country, gospel
- Instruments: Vocals, guitar
- Labels: Magnolia Gold, Elektra, Atco, Atlantic, Crescendo, Motown, MGM, Columbia, Stax, CBS

Delaine Alvin "Delaney" Bramlett (July 1, 1939 – December 27, 2008) was an American singer and guitarist. He was best known for his musical partnership with his wife Bonnie Bramlett in the band Delaney & Bonnie and Friends, which included a wide variety of other musicians, many of whom were successful in other contexts.

== Early life ==
Bramlett was born in Pontotoc, Mississippi. He began playing guitar when he was 8 years old, but did not get serious about the instrument until he was a teenager. He started singing in school and at twelve he had a quartet. Bramlett joined the United States Navy before he was 17, serving for two and a half to three years. He took boot camp at Naval Station Great Lakes, spending over half his hitch there.

After his discharge, he moved to Los Angeles in the early 1960s, where he worked as a bartender before he started performing in clubs.

== Career ==
Bramlett was performing at the Palomino Club in North Hollywood when he was asked to appear in a pilot for a new television show, Shindig!. By 1965, Bramlett was a regular member of the Shindogs, the show's house band. He collaborated as a songwriter with fellow musicians Joey Cooper, Mac Davis, and Jackie DeShannon. During this time, he worked with J.J. Cale and Leon Russell and released some unsuccessful solo singles. Bramlett was the first artist signed to Independence Records, headed by Phil Skaff. His debut single "Guess I Must be Dreamin'" was produced by Russell, entering the Cashbox "Looking Ahead" survey on May 20, 1967, ultimately peaking at 26 on the chart on June 10, 1967.

In the late 1960s, British guitar icon Eric Clapton joined Delaney & Bonnie & Friends on tour, during which Bramlett produced and played on Clapton's debut solo album, Eric Clapton. Clapton has credited Bramlett for pushing him to sing and teaching him the art of rock vocals. Bramlett co-wrote and produced the song "Teasin'" for King Curtis which appeared on Curtis' 1970 album Get Ready.

Bramlett wrote, recorded, or appeared on stage with many notable performers, including Joe Cocker, Jimi Hendrix, Janis Joplin, Billy Preston, John Lennon, the Everly Brothers, Duane Allman, Spooner Oldham, Steve Cropper, and Billy Burnette.

Members of the Friends appearing in concert or recording with Bramlett on Friends albums include Clapton, Harrison, Leon Russell, Curtis, Duane Allman, Gregg Allman, Dave Mason, Rita Coolidge, Carl Radle, Jim Gordon, Bobby Whitlock, Jim Keltner, Bobby Keys, and Gram Parsons.

Their album Delaney & Bonnie & Friends On Tour With Eric Clapton (1970) reached No. 29 on the Billboard 200. Between 1970 and 1972, the duo had seven songs chart on the Billboard Hot 100, including their best-known single, the poignant "Never Ending Song of Love", which peaked at No. 13 and a cover of Dave Mason's "Only You Know and I Know", which peaked at No. 20. Delaney & Bonnie ended their professional and personal relationship in 1972.

In 2006, Bramlett was one of the duet artists on the Jerry Lee Lewis album Last Man Standing, singing and playing guitar on "Lost Highway". In 2008, Bramlett released his first CD in six years, A New Kind of Blues. He died later that year.

== Personal life ==
Bramlett was married to Bonnie Lynn O'Farrell. The couple had a daughter Bekka Bramlett, who was a member of Fleetwood Mac from 1993-1995 and has had a long career as a vocalist, backing various country and pop artists, and releasing several solo albums. Their marriage was marred by violence due to their cocaine addictions. They divorced in 1972, ending their musical partnership as well. Bramlett married Kim Carmel Bramlett in 1992. They were together for 13 years. Kim, a musician/singer and chief engineer at the studio, recorded the last several albums during the period of 1989–2000. They divorced in 2001.

Bramlett died from complications of gallbladder surgery at UCLA Ronald Reagan Medical Center in Los Angeles on December 27, 2008. Surviving were his widow, actress Susan Lanier-Bramlett; a brother, John Wayne Bramlett; three daughters, Michele Bramlett, Suzanne Bramlett, and Bekka Bramlett; and two grandchildren. He was buried at Forest Lawn, Hollywood Hills Cemetery in Los Angeles.

== Legacy ==
Described in an obituary as a "Southern Legend", Bramlett's song "Never Ending Song of Love" has been covered by others and was used on the soundtrack of the films RV and A Good Year.

Bramlett was inducted into the Mississippi Musicians Hall of Fame on January 18, 2011.

== Discography ==
=== Delaney & Bonnie ===
- 1969: Home (Stax STS-2026)
- 1969: Accept No Substitute [AKA The Original Delaney & Bonnie] (Elektra EKS-74039)
- 1970: Delaney & Bonnie & Friends On Tour with Eric Clapton (Atco SD 33-326)
- 1970: To Bonnie from Delaney (Atco SD 33-341)
- 1971: Genesis (early recordings from 1964 to 1965 and 1967) (GNP Crescendo GNPS-2054)
- 1971: Motel Shot (Atco SD 33-358)
- 1972: Country Life (Atco SD 33-383)
- 1972: D&B Together (Columbia KC-31377) -note: reissue of Country Life.
- 1972: The Best of Delaney & Bonnie (Atco SD-7014)
- 1990: The Best of Delaney & Bonnie (Rhino R2-70777)

=== Solo ===
- 1972: Some Things Coming (Columbia KC-31631)
- 1973: Mobius Strip (Columbia KC-32420)
- 1975: Giving Birth to a Song (MGM SE-5011)
- 1977: Class Reunion (Prodigal P6-10017-S1)
- 1998: Sounds From Home (Zane ZN-1013)
- 2004: Sweet Inspiration (rec. 1989) (Lemon LEM-36)
- 2007: A New Kind of Blues (Magnolia Gold MGR-7181)

== Other credits ==
- 1969: Elvin Bishop, Best of Elvin Bishop: "Tulsa Shuffle" – Rhythm guitar, background vocals, producer
- 1970: The Crickets, Rockin' 50's Rock 'n' Roll – Producer
- 1970: Elvin Bishop, Best of Elvin Bishop: "Crabshaw" – Producer
- 1970: Eric Clapton, Eric Clapton – Arranger, rhythm guitar, background vocals, producer
- 1970: Leon Russell, Leon Russell – Guitar
- 1970: Dave Mason, Alone Together – Guitar, vocals
- 1971: John Simon, John Simon's Album – Tambourine
- 1972: Elvin Bishop, Rock My Soul – Guitar, vocals, producer
- 1972: John Hammond Jr, I'm Satisfied – Producer, vocals, guitar
- 1972: Eric Clapton, The History of Eric Clapton – Guitar, vocals
- 1972: Eric Clapton, Eric Clapton at His Best – Producer
- 1972: Duane Allman, An Anthology – Rhythm guitar, vocals, producer
- 1972: Everly Brothers, Stories We Could Tell – Guitar, vocals
- 1973: Jerry Lee Lewis, Sometimes a Memory Ain't Enough – Guitar, vocals
- 1973: Pacific Gas & Electric, Best – Producer
- 1973: John Ussery, Ussery – Percussion, producer, slide guitar
- 1973: Jerry Lee Lewis, The Session...Recorded in London – Bottleneck guitar
- 1974: Duane Allman, An Anthology Vol. II – Guitar, vocals
- 1976: Free Creek, Summit Meeting – Guitar
- 1978: Commander Cody, Flying Dreams – Vocals
- 1978: Dann Rogers, Hearts Under Fire – Background vocals
- 1982: Eric Clapton, Time Pieces: Best of Eric Clapton – Rhythm guitar, producer
- 1988: Eric Clapton, Crossroads – Guitar, vocals, producer, horn arrangements
- 1991: Zoo, Shakin' the Cage – Background vocals
- 1992: Phil Driscoll, Picture Changes – Background vocals
- 1992: Classic Rock Classic Rock [Cema] – Producer
- 1996: Heroes of Country Music, Vol. 5 – Vocals, producer
- 1997: Hank Thompson, Hank, Real Thing – Background vocals, National dobro
- 1998: Ian Whitcomb, You Turn Me On: The Very Best of Ian Whitcomb – Bass guitar
- 1998: T. Graham Brown, Wine into Water – Guitar, vocals
- 1999: Dave Mason, Ultimate Collection – Background vocals
- 2006: Jerry Lee Lewis, Last Man Standing, "Lost Highway" – Vocals
- 2006: (performer: "Attention to Me", "Coffee", "I Had to Come Back", "Something's Gotta Be Wrong") / (writer: "Attention to Me", "Coffee", "I Had to Come Back", "Something's Gotta Be Wrong") for the feature film The Still Life
