= Motel Shot =

Studio album by Delaney & Bonnie and Friends
- Released: March 1971
- Recorded: 1971
- Genres: Blues; gospel; country
- Length: 45:46
- Label: Atco
- Producer: Delaney Bramlett

Delaney & Bonnie and Friends chronology
To Bonnie from Delaney (1970)	Motel Shot (1971)	D&B Together (1972)

Professional ratings
Review scores
Source	Rating
AllMusic	4.5/5 stars
Christgau's Record Guide	A
The Rolling Stone Album Guide	3.5/5 stars

Motel Shot is a fifth album by Delaney & Bonnie and Friends, released in 1971. The album, their third for Atco/Atlantic (catalog no. SD 33–358) and fifth overall, is a mostly acoustic set. The album's title refers to the impromptu, sometimes late-night, jam sessions pursued by touring musicians when on the road.

In the liner notes, Delaney Bramlett dedicates the album to "My mom who sang alto." Bonnie Bramlett wrote "If this album can make one person feel half of what I felt on this session, then I am happy. It is to all of you with love."

The album reached #65 on the Billboard album chart, and includes Delaney and Bonnie's biggest chart single, "Never Ending Song of Love", which peaked at #13. "Never Ending Song of Love" would immediately become a popular tune to cover, with hit versions being recorded by The New Seekers and Dickey Lee at the same time as Delaney & Bonnie's version (each becoming a hit in different markets) and the Osmond Brothers having a minor hit with it a decade later.

Guest musicians on the album include Leon Russell, Joe Cocker, Duane Allman, Dave Mason, John Hartford, Ben Benay, Clarence White, Gram Parsons and Bobby Whitlock.

== Track listing ==
1. "Where the Soul Never Dies" (Traditional) – 3:24
2. "Will the Circle Be Unbroken" (A. P. Carter) – 2:42
3. "Rock of Ages" (Traditional) – 2:17
4. "Long Road Ahead" (Delaney Bramlett, Bonnie Bramlett, Carl Radle) – 3:25
5. "Faded Love" (Bob Wills, Johnnie Wills) – 4:03
6. "Talkin' about Jesus" (Traditional) – 6:51
7. "Come On In My Kitchen" (Robert Johnson) – 2:41
8. "Don't Deceive Me (Please Don't Go)" (Chuck Willis) – 3:54
9. "Never Ending Song of Love" (Delaney Bramlett) – 3:20
10. "Sing My Way Home" (Delaney Bramlett) – 4:02
11. "Goin' Down the Road Feelin' Bad" (Traditional, Delaney Bramlett) – 5:12
12. "Lonesome and a Long Way from Home" (Delaney Bramlett, Bonnie Bramlett, Leon Russell) – 3:55

Note that original pressings of the album credit "Come On In My Kitchen" not to Robert Johnson but to "Payne", a pseudonym under which some of Johnson's music was published at the time. (Original pressings of The Rolling Stones' 1969 album Let It Bleed credit Johnson's song "Love in Vain" in similar manner).

== Personnel ==
- Delaney Bramlett – guitar, vocals, arranger
- Bonnie Bramlett – vocals
- Duane Allman – slide guitar (tracks 7, 10–11)
- Ben Benay – guitar
- Kenny Gradney – bass guitar
- John Hartford – banjo, fiddle
- Eddie James – guitar
- Jim Keltner – drums
- Bobby Keys – saxophone
- Dave Mason – guitar
- Gram Parsons – guitar, vocals
- Carl Radle – bass guitar
- Joe Cocker – backing vocals on 'Where The Soul Never Dies' and 'Talkin' about Jesus'
- Leon Russell – piano, keyboards, vocals
- Clarence White – guitar, vocals
- Bobby Whitlock – vocals
- Jay York – backing vocals
- Johnny Bramlett – Samsonite Briefcase

== Production ==
- Producer: Delaney Bramlett
- Recording engineers: Bruce Botnick, Richard Moore, Lewis Peters
- Art direction: n/a
- Photography: Barry Feinstein
- Liner notes: Tom Wilkes
