= Endless Boogie =

Studio album by John Lee Hooker
- Released: 1971
- Recorded: Wally Heider Recording
- Genre: Blues
- Length: 72:27
- Label: ABC
- Producer: Bill Szymczyk, Ed Michel

John Lee Hooker chronology
Goin' Down Highway 51 (1971)	Endless Boogie (1971)	Kabuki Wuki (1971)

Endless Boogie is a studio album by American blues musician John Lee Hooker, released in 1971 through ABC Records. Produced by Bill Szymczyk and Ed Michel, the double album was recorded at Wally Heider Recording with session musicians such as Jesse Ed Davis, Carl Radle, Steve Miller, Gino Skaggs and Mark Naftalin.

American blues rock band Endless Boogie is named after the album.

== Critical reception ==
Professional ratings
Review scores
Source	Rating
Allmusic	2/5 stars
Christgau's Record Guide	B+
The Penguin Guide to Blues Recordings	2.5/4 stars

Cub Koda of Allmusic wrote: "Although Hooker has always had trouble finding bands that could keep up with his idiosyncratic timing, it's not an impossible task, and the musicians on board for this session just seem to be endlessly riffing rather than providing a sympathetic framework for John Lee to work his magic." Koda also criticized John Lee Hooker's "scarce involvement" in the album and further stated: "There are lots of John Lee Hooker albums in the bin; pass this one by."

In contrast, Rolling Stone critic Gary von Tersch was positive in his assessment, stating: "Throughout, it's Hooker all the way he makes it his brand of blues with the case and dexterity of the genius he is all the textures and highlights paced with his ever-churning, heavy-bassed electric guitar and his rough down-and-out voice." Music critic Robert Christgau wrote: "The white audience hasn't much changed Hooker's sound, so the timeliness of Endless Boogie is an unmitigated plus, and producers Bill Szymczyk and Ed Michel get a relaxed groove out of a cast of supporting musicians who can boogie Canned Heat right out of the studio."

== Track listing ==
All songs written by John Lee Hooker.

1. "(I Got) a Good 'Un" – 5:12
2. "House Rent Boogie" – 6:23
3. "Kick Hit 4 Hit Kix U (Blues for Jimi and Janis)" – 6:41
4. "Standin' at the Crossroads" – 6:08
5. "Pots On, Gas On High" – 11:22
6. "We Might As Well Call It Through (I Didn't Get Married to Your Two-Timing Mother)" – 8:04
7. "Doin' The Shout" – 3:31
8. "A Sheep Out On The Foam" – 6:27
9. "I Don't Need No Steam Heat – 4:17
10. "Sittin' in My Dark Room" – 5:38
11. "Endless Boogie, Parts 27 And 28" – 8:44

== Personnel ==
- John Lee Hooker – guitar, vocals, songwriting
- Carl Radle – bass guitar (5, 6)
- Gino Skaggs – bass (1–4, 7–8, 10)
- Billy Ingram – drums (1, 10)
- Jim Gordon – drums (5–6)
- Ken Swank – drums (tracks: 1–4, 7–8)
- Reno Lanzara – drums (9–11)
- Cliff Coulter – electric piano (1, 3, 5, 6, 8, 10), Fender bass (9), guitar (11)
- John Turk – electric piano (9); organ (11)
- Bill Szymczyk – engineering, production
- Dan Alexander – guitar (2, 8)
- Jerry Perez – guitar (11)
- Jesse Ed Davis – guitar (5–6)
- Mel Brown – guitar (1, 9–11)
- Steve Miller – guitar (1–2, 4, 7, 9–11)
- Dave Berger – harmonica (2, 11)
- Mark Naftalin – piano (2, 4–6, 9–11), guitar (3)
- Ed Michel – production
- Ken Swank – tambourine (11)
