= Never Ending Song of Love =

1971 single by Delaney & Bonnie

Single by Delaney & Bonnie
- B-side: "Don't Deceive Me (Please Don't Go)"
- Released: May 1971 (U.S.)
- Label: Atco
- Songwriter: Delaney Bramlett
- Producer: Delaney Bramlett

Delaney & Bonnie singles chronology
"Free the People" (1970)	"Never Ending Song of Love" (1971)	"Only You Know and I Know" (1971)

"Never Ending Song of Love" is a song written by Delaney Bramlett, and, according to some sources, by his wife Bonnie Bramlett. It was originally recorded with their band, Delaney & Bonnie & Friends, in 1971 on the album Motel Shot. Released as a single by Atco Records the same year, "Never Ending Song of Love" became Delaney & Bonnie's greatest hit on the pop charts, reaching a peak of No. 13 on the Billboard Hot 100 and No. 8 on Easy Listening. It reached No. 16 in Australia.

A cover version by the New Seekers was a major hit in the United Kingdom and Ireland in 1971. It spent a few weeks at No. 2 in the UK charts and in South Africa, and reached No. 1 in the Irish charts. It was featured on their album of the same name.

As of 2008, "Never Ending Song of Love", had been covered by over 100 artists.

== Chart history ==
=== Weekly charts ===
Delaney & Bonnie

Chart (1971)	Peak position
Australia (Kent Music Report)	16
Canada RPM Adult Contemporary	16
Canada RPM Top Singles	6
New Zealand (Listener)	1
US Billboard Hot 100	13
US Billboard Adult Contemporary	8
US Cash Box Top 100	9

=== Year-end charts ===
Delaney & Bonnie

Chart (1971)	Rank
Australia	93
Canada	81
US Billboard Hot 100	67
US Cash Box	66

New Seekers

Chart (1971)	Peak position
Australia	25
Ireland (IRMA)	1
South Africa (Springbok)	2
UK Singles (Official Charts)	2

Chart (1971)	Rank
Australia	168
South Africa	18
UK	7

== Other cover versions ==
On the country music charts, at least three versions have charted:

- Dickey Lee recorded a version at the same time as Delaney & Bonnie's original, which reached No. 8 on Billboard's Hot Country Singles charts.
- Eleven years later, in 1982, the Osmond Brothers' version reached No. 43 on the country charts.
- Crystal Gayle's last U.S. chart hit was a cover of the song, which reached No. 72 on the country chart in 1990.
- A French-language cover of the song (as "Un amour qui ne veut pas mourir") was also recorded by Canadian singer Renée Martel in 1972 as one of the first songs she recorded after transitioning from pop to country music. This song was on the charts for 19 weeks in Quebec, including 2 weeks in first position.
- Tejano star Ram Herrera also recorded a cover version on Bob Gallarza's 1993 album Forever.
- George Jones and Tammy Wynette recorded a version of the song for their 1973 album We're Gonna Hold On.
