= Ambush (Marc Benno album) =

Studio album by Marc Benno
- Released: 1972
- Genre: Rock
- Label: A&M
- Producer: David Anderle, Marc Benno

Marc Benno chronology
Minnows (1971)	Ambush (1972)	Lost in Austin (1979)

Ambush is the third album by the American musician Marc Benno, released in 1972. It peaked at No. 171 on Billboard's Top LP's & Tape chart.

== Production ==
The album was coproduced by David Anderle. All of its songs were written or cowritten by Benno. He was backed by Jesse Ed Davis on guitar, Carl Radle on bass, and Jim Keltner on drums, among others. Bobby Keys contributed on saxophone. "Here to Stay Blues" is a duet with Bonnie Bramlett. "Donut Man" is about a poor man who goes to great lengths to help others. "Jive Fade Jive" is an instrumental.

== Critical reception ==
Professional ratings
Review scores
Source	Rating
AllMusic	4.5/5 stars
Robert Christgau	B+
Daily Sun-Post	2/5 stars
The Encyclopedia of Popular Music	2/5 stars
The Post-Crescent	2/5 stars
The New Rolling Stone Record Guide	2/5 stars

Billboard said that Benno "has at last crafted an album that has more than just underground appeal." The South Bay Daily Breeze opined that he was "a better vocalist and far-better guitarist" than lyricist. The Oregon Journal noted that Ambush was more blues-oriented than Benno's previous work. The Daily Sun-Post criticized the "barely sketched musical works" and "trite lyrics".

The Omaha World-Herald called the album "rock music with solid blues underpinnings." The Times praised the "constantly fine instrumental work." The Honolulu Star-Advertiser admired the "swift, inventive style." Robert Christgau wrote, "In a lot of ways this is a perfect record—easy studio funk unmarred by a single error of commission. Benno does Boz Scaggs a lot looser and happier than Boz Scaggs has for a while". The Post-Crescent concluded that Benno should stick to being "a studio musician and session man."

== Track listing ==
Side 1

1. "Poor Boy"
2. "Southern Woman"
3. "Jive Fade Jive"
4. "Hall Street Jive"

Side 2

1. "Share"
2. "Donut Man"
3. "Sunshine Feelin'"
4. "Here to Stay Blues"
5. "Either Way It Happens"
