= The Original Delaney & Bonnie & Friends =

The Original Delaney & Bonnie: Accept No Substitute

Studio album by Delaney & Bonnie
- Released: July 1969
- Recorded: 1969
- Studios: Elektra, Los Angeles, California
- Genres: Soul; rock and roll
- Length: 34:22
- Label: Elektra
- Producers: Delaney Bramlett, assisted by David Anderle

Delaney & Bonnie chronology
Home (1969)	The Original Delaney & Bonnie: Accept No Substitute (1969)	On Tour with Eric Clapton (1970)

The Original Delaney & Bonnie, also known by its subtitle Accept No Substitute, is the second studio album by American recording duo Delaney & Bonnie. It was recorded with many of the "friends" that would form the core of their best-known 1969–70 touring band, including Bobby Whitlock, Carl Radle and Rita Coolidge.

The Original Delaney & Bonnie & Friends was released in July 1969 after Delaney & Bonnie had signed to Elektra Records. It peaked at number 175 on the Billboard Top LPs chart in August, and received widespread acclaim from critics.

== Background ==
Upon hearing pre-release mixes of the album, George Harrison offered Delaney and Bonnie a contract with the Beatles' Apple Records label, which they signed despite their prior contractual commitment to Elektra. According to Elektra founder Jac Holzman's book on that label's early history, Apple went so far as to make test pressings of Accept No Substitute based on this contract, which was subsequently voided.

After the album's release, frustrated that no copies of Accept No Substitute were available in his father's home town record store, an apparently drunken Delaney Bramlett phoned Holzman (who was in the UK at the time) saying that he would "come to England and kill" Holzman if the situation was not immediately corrected. Holzman responded by releasing Delaney and Bonnie from their Elektra contract.

One song from this album, "Ghetto," would become a regular feature of Delaney and Bonnie's live shows. The song, co-authored by Bonnie during Delaney and Bonnie's tenure at Stax Records, was later covered by Stax stars The Staple Singers.

== Critical reception ==
Professional ratings
Review scores
Source	Rating
AllMusic	3.5/5 stars
Q	4/5 stars
Rolling Stone	4/5 stars
The Village Voice	A+

The Original Delaney & Bonnie was widely acclaimed by music critics. In a contemporary review for The New York Times, Robert Christgau praised the duo's singing and lyrics of "rich but implicit" sexuality and commonplace truths about love. He was also impressed by how the album appropriates soul music, but asserted that "it is a white album, and for once that's good. No black singers would record anything so eccentric, so unabashedly baroque, in its celebration of black music." In his ballot for Jazz & Pop magazine's annual critics poll, Christgau ranked it as the eighth best album of the year. English guitarist Eric Clapton said he "immediately loved the album", calling it "hardcore R&B, and very soulful, with great guitar playing and a fantastic horn section". He subsequently enlisted Delaney & Bonnie to be support act to his band Blind Faith on their 1969 American tour.

In a retrospective review, music journalist Nick Logan wrote that The Original Delaney & Bonnie & Friends "still stands as a remarkable document – the quintessential fusion of gospel, country and soul influences that was easily the most exciting sound of its time." AllMusic's Ronnie D. Lankford, Jr. said it featured the kind of mixture of soul and rock and roll later present on Layla and Other Assorted Love Songs (1970) by Clapton's project Derek & the Dominos, recommending it to listeners unfamiliar with Delaney & Bonnie's other work. Q magazine cited it as one of 1969's "keynote albums", while Rolling Stone called it "a wonderfully earthy mix of blue-eyed soul, gospel and country, brimming with grit and longing".

== Track listing ==
1. "Get Ourselves Together" (Delaney Bramlett, Bonnie Bramlett, Carl Radle) – 2:25
2. "Someday" (Delaney Bramlett, Jerry Allison, Bonnie Bramlett, Doug Gilmore) – 3:29
3. "Ghetto" (Delaney Bramlett, Bettye Crutcher, Homer Banks, Bonnie Bramlett) – 4:55
4. "When the Battle Is Over" (Mac Rebennack, Jessie Hill) – 3:32
5. "Dirty Old Man" (Delaney Bramlett, Mac Davis) – 2:31
6. "Love Me a Little Longer" (Delaney Bramlett, Bonnie Bramlett) – 2:57
7. "I Can't Take It Much Longer" (Delaney Bramlett, Joey Cooper) – 3:07
8. "Do Right Woman, Do Right Man" (Dan Penn, Chips Moman) – 5:23
9. "Soldiers of the Cross" (Traditional) – 3:10
10. "Gift of Love" (Delaney Bramlett, Mac Davis) – 2:53

== Personnel ==
=== Musicians ===
- Bonnie Bramlett – vocals
- Delaney Bramlett – guitars, vocals
- Leon Russell – guitars, piano
- Gerry McGee – guitars
- Carl Radle – bass guitar
- Bobby Whitlock – organ, keyboards, vocals
- Bobby Keys – saxophone
- Jim Price – trombone, trumpet, horns
- Rita Coolidge – backing vocals
- Jim Keltner – drums, percussion

=== Production ===
- Delaney Bramlett - producer, arrangements
- David Anderle - supervising producer
- Leon Russell - arrangements
- Jimmie Haskell - string arrangements on "Do Right Woman" and "Ghetto"
- John Haeny - engineer
- Barry Feinstein - photography

== Bibliography ==
- Clapton, Eric (2007). Clapton: The Autobiography. Crown Publishing Group. ISBN 978-0385518512.
- Clifford, Mike (1986). The Harmony Illustrated Encyclopedia of Rock (5th ed.). Harmony Books. ISBN 0517562642.
- Holzman, Jac; Daws, Gavan (1998). Follow the Music: The Life and High Times of Elektra Records in the Great Years of American Pop Culture. FirstMedia Books. ISBN 0966122119.
- Logan, Nick; Woffinden, Bob (1978). The Illustrated Encyclopedia of Rock. Harmony Books. ISBN 9780517534113.
- Rees, Dafydd; Crampton, Luke (1991). Rock Movers & Shakers. ABC-CLIO. ISBN 0874366615.
