= Home (Delaney & Bonnie album) =

Studio album by Delaney & Bonnie
- Released: May 1969
- Recorded: 1968–1969
- Studio: Stax Studios, Memphis, Tennessee
- Genre: Soul
- Length: 29:41
- Label: Stax
- Producer: Don Nix, Donald "Duck" Dunn

Delaney & Bonnie chronology
Home (1969)	The Original Delaney & Bonnie & Friends (1969)

Professional ratings
Review scores
Source	Rating
Allmusic	3.5/5 stars
Robert Christgau	B+

Home is the debut album by husband-and-wife singers Delaney & Bonnie, released on the Stax label (catalog no. STS-2026). Most of the album was recorded at Stax Studios in Memphis, Tennessee, from February to November 1968, with additional overdubs in July 1969, and features many of Stax's house musicians, including Donald "Duck" Dunn, Steve Cropper, Booker T. Jones, and Isaac Hayes.

The album's cover photo shows Delaney and Bonnie with Delaney's grandfather, John Bramlett, in front of the log cabin in Pontotoc, Mississippi, where Delaney grew up.

Stax released two singles from the album in the U.S., "It's Been a Long Time Coming" (1969) and "Hard to Say Goodbye" (1970). (The latter was issued to capitalize on the success of Delaney and Bonnie's later recordings for Atco/Atlantic, which once had a partnership with Stax.) "Just Plain Beautiful" b/w "Hard to Say Goodbye" was also issued as a single in the UK in 1969.

Home was remastered and re-released by Stax / Universal on CD, including several bonus tracks, in 2006. However, the remaster is in MONO only (although the cover states "AAD/Stereo). All previous vinyl, tape and CD issues were in stereo. The album's two US single A-sides are also included in the Stax compilation box set The Complete Stax/Volt Soul Singles, Vol. 2 – 1968–71.

== Track listing ==
No.	Title	Writer(s)	Recording date(s)	Length
1.	"It's Been a Long Time Coming"	Delaney Bramlett, Bonnie Bramlett	February 7, 1968	2:26
2.	"A Right Now Love"	B. Bramlett, Homer Banks	August 6 and September 13, 1968	2:19
3.	"We Can Love"	Steve Cropper, Eddie Floyd	August 6, September 13, 1968, July 2nd 1969	2:23
4.	"My Baby Specializes"	Isaac Hayes, David Porter	February 27, 1968	3:15
5.	"Everybody Loves a Winner"	Booker T. Jones, William Bell	November 1, 1968, July 1, 1969	4:45
6.	"Things Get Better"	Cropper, Eddie Floyd, Wayne Jackson	February 27, 1968	2:22
7.	"Just Plain Beautiful"	Cropper, Bettye Crutcher	August 6, September 13, 1968	2:09
8.	"Hard to Say Goodbye"	B. Bramlett, Carl Radle	August 7, 1968, July 1, 1969	2:30
9.	"Pour Your Love on Me"	Banks, B. Bramlett	August 7, September 13, 1968, July 2nd 1969	2:47
10.	"Piece of My Heart"	Bert Berns, Jerry Ragovoy	November 1, 1968, July 1, 1969	4:45

== 2006 Resequenced and Expanded Edition ==
1. "A Long Road Ahead" (Radle, B. Bramlett, D. Bramlett) – 3:01 Recorded November 1, 1968 and July 1, 1969
2. "My Baby Specializes" (Hayes, Porter) – 3:15 – Recorded February 27, 1968
3. "Things Get Better" (Cropper, Floyd, Jackson) – 2:22 – Recorded February 27, 1968
4. "We Can Love" (Cropper, Floyd) – 2:23 – Recorded August 6, September 13, 1968, July 2nd 1969
5. "All We Really Want to Do" (D. Bramlett, B. Bramlett) – 2:54 – Recorded November 1, 1968 and July 2, 1969
6. "It's Been a Long Time Coming" (D. Bramlett, B. Bramlett) – 2:26 – Recorded February 7, 1968
7. "Just Plain Beautiful" (Cropper, Crutcher) – 2:09 – Recorded August 6, September 13, 1968
8. "Everybody Loves a Winner" (Jones, Bell) – 4:45 – Recorded November 1, 1968, July 1, 1969
9. "Look What We Have Found" (unknown) – 2:59 – unknown
10. "Piece of My Heart" (Berns, Ragovoy) – 4:45 – Recorded November 1, 1968, July 1, 1969
11. "A Right Now Love" (B. Bramlett, Banks) – 2:19 – Recorded August 6, September 13, 1968
12. "I've Just Been Feeling Bad" (Cropper, Floyd) – 2:54 – Recorded February 27, 1968
13. "Dirty Old Man" (D. Bramlett, Davis) – 2:37 – Recorded August 7, 1968
14. "Get Ourselves Together" (Radle, B. Bramlett, D. Bramlett) – 2:27 – Recorded August 6, 1968
15. "Pour Your Love on Me" (Banks, B. Bramlett) – 2:47 – Recorded August 7, September 13, 1968, July 2nd 1969
16. "Hard to Say Goodbye" (B. Bramlett, Radle) – 2:30 – Recorded August 7, 1968, July 1, 1969

An interesting side note to the 2006 Resequenced and Expanded Edition, Is that it features a picture on the back cover of Delaney, Bonnie, Isaac Hayes + Bobby Whitlock.

Bobby Whitlock claims an active participation in this recording for D&B at Stax, but sadly Delaney and others decided to give him no credit for his participation.

== Personnel ==
- Delaney Bramlett – guitar, vocals
- Bonnie Bramlett – vocals
- Leon Russell, Booker T. Jones – keyboards
- Isaac Hayes – keyboards, vocals
- Steve Cropper – guitar
- Donald Dunn, Carl Radle – bass guitar
- Al Jackson Jr. – drums
- Jimmy Karstein – percussion
- The Memphis Horns :
  - Wayne Jackson – trumpet
  - Andrew Love – tenor saxophone
  - Joe Arnold – saxophone
  - Dick Steff – trumpet
  - Jay Pruitt – trumpet
  - John Davis – trumpet
  - Ben Cauley – trumpet
  - Ed Logan – tenor saxophone
  - Jim Terry – saxophone
- William Bell – vocals
- Phil Forrest – vocals

== Production ==
- Producer: Don Nix, Donald Dunn
- Recording Engineer: Ron Capone
- Art Direction: Jamie Putman
- Photography: Barry Feinstein
- Cover Design: Tom Wilkes
- Liner Notes: Michael Point

Special thanks to the friends of Delaney & Bonnie and Leon Russell.
