= Jim Gordon (musician) =

American musician and convicted murderer (1945–2023)

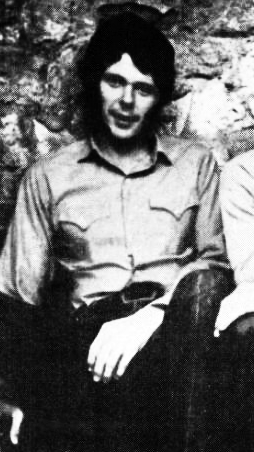
- Gordon with Derek and the Dominos in February 1971

Background information
- Born: James Beck Gordon; July 14, 1945; Los Angeles, California, U.S.
- Died: March 13, 2023 (aged 77) Vacaville, California, U.S.
- Genre: Rock
- Occupation: Drummer
- Instruments: Drums; percussion
- Years active: 1963–1980
- Formerly of: Delaney & Bonnie and Friends; Derek and the Dominos; Traffic

James Beck Gordon (July 14, 1945 – March 13, 2023) was an American musician, songwriter and convicted murderer. Gordon was a session drummer in the late 1960s and 1970s and played drums in the blues rock supergroup Derek and the Dominos.

In 1983, in a psychotic episode associated with undiagnosed schizophrenia, Gordon murdered his mother and was sentenced to 16 years to life in prison, remaining incarcerated until his death in 2023.

== Music career ==
James Beck Gordon was raised in the San Fernando Valley of Los Angeles and attended Grant High School. He passed up a music scholarship to UCLA in order to begin his professional career in 1963, at age 17, backing the Everly Brothers. He went on to become one of the most sought-after recording session drummers in Los Angeles. The protégé of studio drummer Hal Blaine, Gordon performed on many notable recordings in the 1960s, including Pet Sounds by the Beach Boys (1966); The Spirit of '67 by Paul Revere & the Raiders; Gene Clark with the Gosdin Brothers by Gene Clark (1967); Who Knows Where the Time Goes by Judy Collins (1968); The Notorious Byrd Brothers by the Byrds (1968); and the hit "Classical Gas" by Mason Williams (1968). At the height of his career Gordon was reportedly so busy as a studio musician that he flew from Las Vegas to Los Angeles every day to do two or three recording sessions and then returned in time to play the evening show at Caesars Palace.

In 1969 and 1970 Gordon toured as part of the backing band for Delaney & Bonnie, which at the time included Eric Clapton. Clapton subsequently took the group's rhythm section—Gordon (drummer), Carl Radle (bassist), Bobby Whitlock (keyboardist, singer, songwriter)—and they formed a new band, later called Derek and the Dominos. The band's first studio work was as the house band for George Harrison's three-disc set All Things Must Pass (1970).

Gordon then played on Derek and the Dominos' 1970 double album Layla and Other Assorted Love Songs and also played with the band on subsequent U.S. and UK tours. The group split in spring 1971 before they finished recording their second album. In addition to his drumming, Gordon was credited with contributing the elegiac piano coda for the title track, "Layla".

In later years, Whitlock claimed that the coda was not actually written by Gordon: "Jim took that piano melody from his ex-girlfriend Rita Coolidge. I know because in the D&B days I lived in John Garfield's old house in the Hollywood Hills and there was a guest house with an upright piano in it. Rita and Jim were up there in the guest house and invited me to join in on writing this song with them called 'Time'. (Her sister Priscilla wound up recording it with Booker T. Jones) Jim took the melody from Rita's song and didn't give her credit for writing it. Her boyfriend ripped her off." Graham Nash (who later dated Coolidge) substantiated Whitlock's claim in his memoir. "Time" was not released by Priscilla Coolidge and Booker T. until 1973, on their album Chronicles.

In 1970 Gordon was part of Joe Cocker's Mad Dogs & Englishmen tour and played on Dave Mason's album Alone Together. In 1971, he toured with Traffic and appeared on two of their albums, including The Low Spark of High Heeled Boys. That same year he played on Harry Nilsson's album Nilsson Schmilsson, contributing the drum solo on the track "Jump into the Fire".

Gordon was the drummer on the Incredible Bongo Band's album Bongo Rock, released in 1972, and his drum break on the LP version of "Apache" has been frequently sampled by hip-hop music artists. He recorded with Frank Zappa, including on the title track of the 1974 album Apostrophe ('). Also in 1972, Gordon played drums on Helen Reddy's Top 20 US album I Am Woman.

In 1973 Gordon played on Johnny Rivers's Blue Suede Shoes as well as on Art Garfunkel's Angel Clare album, and toured with Rivers through 1974 appearing on the Last Boogie in Paris live album. Also in 1974, Gordon played on most of the tracks on Steely Dan's album Pretzel Logic, including the single "Rikki Don't Lose That Number". He again worked with Chris Hillman of the Byrds as the drummer in the Souther–Hillman–Furay Band from 1973 to 1975. He also played drums on three tracks on Alice Cooper's 1976 album, Alice Cooper Goes to Hell.

== Mental health ==
Jim developed schizophrenia and began to hear voices (including his mother's), which compelled him to starve himself and prevented him from sleeping, relaxing, or playing drums. His physicians misdiagnosed the problems and instead treated him for alcohol abuse.

While on tour with Joe Cocker in the early 1970s, Jim reportedly punched his then-girlfriend Rita Coolidge in a hotel hallway, causing her to end their relationship.

== Murder of mother, conviction, and incarceration ==
On June 3, 1983, Gordon attacked his 71-year-old widowed mother, Osa Marie (Beck) Gordon, with a hammer, then fatally stabbed her with a butcher knife, claiming that a voice told him to kill her.

Only after his arrest for murder was Gordon properly diagnosed with schizophrenia. At his trial, the court accepted that he had acute schizophrenia, but he was not allowed to use an insanity defense because of changes to California law arising from the federal Insanity Defense Reform Act.

On July 10, 1984, Gordon was sentenced to 16 years to life in prison. He was first eligible for parole in 1991, but it was denied several times because he never attended a parole hearing.

In 2014, he declined to attend his hearing and was denied parole until at least 2018. A Los Angeles deputy district attorney stated at the hearing that Gordon was still "seriously psychologically incapacitated" and "a danger when he is not taking his medication".

In November 2017, Gordon was rediagnosed with schizophrenia. On March 7, 2018, he was denied parole for the tenth time and was tentatively scheduled to become eligible again in March 2021. At the time of his death in 2023, he was serving his sentence at the California Medical Facility, a medical and psychiatric prison in Vacaville, California.

== Death ==
Gordon died in prison on March 13, 2023, at the age of 77. Two marriages, to singer Renee Armand and dancer Jill Barabe, both ended in divorce. He is survived by his daughter.

== Partial discography ==
During his career, Gordon played with a long list of musicians and record producers, including the following:

- Peter Allen: Taught by Experts
- Duane Allman: An Anthology
- Hoyt Axton: My Griffin Is Gone
- Joan Baez: Diamonds & Rust; From Every Stage; Gulf Winds; Blowin' Away
- The Beach Boys: Pet Sounds; Smiley Smile; Friends; 20/20
- The Beau Brummels: Triangle
- Stephen Bishop: Careless
- Cilla Black: It Makes Me Feel Good
- Terence Boylan: Terence Boylan
- Bread: Bread
- Teresa Brewer: 16 Most Requested Songs
- Jackson Browne: The Pretender
- Jack Bruce: Out of the Storm
- Tim Buckley: Goodbye and Hello
- The Byrds: The Notorious Byrd Brothers
- Glen Campbell: "Wichita Lineman"
- The Carpenters: Horizon; A Kind of Hush; Interpretations
- Chad and Jeremy: The Ark
- Cher: Stars
- Eric Clapton: Eric Clapton
- Gene Clark: Gene Clark with the Gosdin Brothers
- Joe Cocker: Mad Dogs & Englishmen
- Judy Collins: Who Knows Where the Time Goes
- Chi Coltrane: Chi Coltrane
- Alice Cooper: Alice Cooper Goes to Hell; Lace and Whiskey
- Crosby, Stills & Nash: Crosby, Stills & Nash
- Burton Cummings: Burton Cummings; Dream of a Child
- Delaney & Bonnie: On Tour with Eric Clapton; D&B Together
- Derek and the Dominos: Layla and Other Assorted Love Songs; In Concert; Live at the Fillmore
- Neil Diamond: Beautiful Noise
- Donovan: Essence to Essence
- Dr. John: The Sun, Moon & Herbs
- The Everly Brothers: Gone Gone Gone; Beat & Soul; Two Yanks in England; Roots; Stories We Could Tell
- Art Garfunkel: Angel Clare; Breakaway
- David Gates: First
- Lowell George: Thanks, I'll Eat It Here
- Merle Haggard: Same Train, a Different Time
- Daryl Hall & John Oates: Daryl Hall & John Oates; Bigger Than Both of Us
- Albert Hammond: It Never Rains in Southern California; The Free Electric Band; Albert Hammond
- George Harrison: All Things Must Pass; Living in the Material World; Extra Texture (Read All About It)
- Jim Henson: The Muppet Movie
- Richard "Groove" Holmes: Six Million Dollar Man
- John Lee Hooker: Endless Boogie
- Jim Horn: Through the Eyes of a Horn; Jim's Horn
- Thelma Houston: I've Got the Music in Me
- The Hues Corporation: Freedom for the Stallion; Rockin' Soul; Love Corporation; I Caught Your Act
- Incredible Bongo Band: "Apache"; Bongo Rock
- Phil Keaggy: Love Broke Thru; Ph'lip Side
- B.B. King: B.B. King in London
- Carole King: The City
- Cheryl Ladd: Dance Forever
- John Lennon: "Power to the People"
- The Lettermen: Lettermen 1; Spin Away
- Gordon Lightfoot: Sundown; Cold on the Shoulder; Gord's Gold; Summertime Dream
- Nils Lofgren: Cry Tough
- Manhattan Transfer: Coming Out; Pastiche
- Dave Mason: Alone Together
- Country Joe McDonald: Love is a Fire
- Maria Muldaur: Maria Muldaur; Waitress in a Donut Shop
- Elliott Murphy: Elliott Murphy; Lost Generation
- Oliver Nelson: Skull Session
- Tracy Nelson: Time Is on My Side
- Randy Newman: Randy Newman; 12 Songs
- Harry Nilsson: Aerial Ballet; Skidoo (Soundtrack); Harry; Nilsson Schmilsson; Son of Dracula (Soundtrack)
- Goro Noguchi: Goro in Los Angeles, U.S.A.
- Yoko Ono: Fly
- Van Dyke Parks: Song Cycle; Discover America
- Tom Petty and the Heartbreakers: Tom Petty and the Heartbreakers; Playback
- Kenny Rankin: Silver Morning
- Redeye: Redeye
- Emitt Rhodes: The American Dream
- Righteous Brothers: Give It to the People
- Minnie Riperton: Adventures in Paradise
- Johnny Rivers: L.A. Reggae; Blue Suede Shoes; Last Boogie in Paris; New Lovers and Old Friends; Wild Night; Outside Help
- Leon Russell: Leon Russell and the Shelter People
- Seals and Crofts: Seals & Crofts; Summer Breeze; Diamond Girl
- John Sebastian: Tarzana Kid
- Louie Shelton: Touch Me
- Judee Sill: Heart Food
- Carly Simon: No Secrets; Hotcakes; Playing Possum
- Tom Snow: Taking It All in Stride; Tom Snow
- The Souther-Hillman-Furay Band: The Souther-Hillman-Furay Band
- Joey Stec: Joey Stec
- Steely Dan: Pretzel Logic
- B. W. Stevenson: Lead Free; My Maria; Calabasas
- John Stewart: The Phoenix Concerts
- Stone Poneys: "Different Drum"; Evergreen, Volume 2
- Barbra Streisand: Barbra Joan Streisand
- Mariya Takeuchi: Love Songs
- Bob Thiele & His Orchestra: I Saw Pinetop Spit Blood
- Mel Tormé: Right Now!
- Traffic: Welcome to the Canteen; The Low Spark of High Heeled Boys
- John Travolta: John Travolta
- John Valenti: Anything You Want
- Tom Waits: The Heart of Saturday Night
- Tim Weisberg: Hurtwood Edge; Dreamspeaker
- Bobby Whitlock: Bobby Whitlock; Raw Velvet
- Andy Williams
- Mason Williams: "Classical Gas"
- Frank Zappa: Apostrophe ('); Läther; 'Grand Wazoo' (tour) and 'Petit Wazoo' (tour); Imaginary Diseases; Wazoo; Little Dots
