= Bobby Whitlock =

American singer, songwriter and musician (1948–2025)

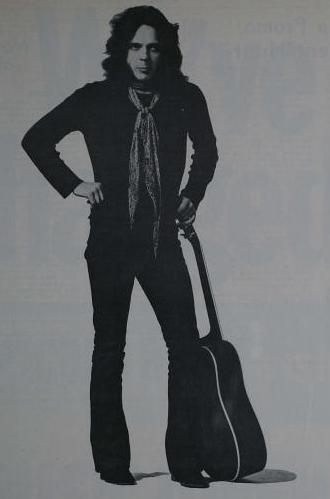
- Whitlock in 1972

Background information
- Born: Robert Stanley Whitlock; March 18, 1948; Memphis, Tennessee, U.S.
- Died: August 10, 2025 (aged 77) Ozona, Texas, U.S.
- Genres: Rock; soul; gospel; blues
- Occupations: Musician; singer-songwriter
- Instruments: Vocals; keyboards; guitar
- Years active: 1965–2015
- Labels: Stax; Elektra; ABC-Dunhill; Capricorn; Swan Song; Atco; Grapevine; Domino
- Formerly of: Delaney & Bonnie and Friends; Derek and the Dominos

Robert Stanley Whitlock (March 18, 1948 – August 10, 2025) was an American singer, songwriter, and musician. He was best known as a member of the blues-rock band Derek and the Dominos, with Eric Clapton, in 1970–71. Whitlock's musical career began with Memphis soul acts such as Sam & Dave and Booker T. & the M.G.'s before he joined Delaney & Bonnie and Friends in 1968. His association with Delaney & Bonnie bandmate Clapton led to Whitlock's participation in sessions for George Harrison's 1970 triple album All Things Must Pass, in London, and the formation of Derek and the Dominos that year. On the band's sole studio album, the critically acclaimed Layla and Other Assorted Love Songs, Whitlock wrote or co-wrote seven of the album's fourteen tracks, including "Tell the Truth", "Bell Bottom Blues", "Why Does Love Got to Be So Sad?" and "Thorn Tree in the Garden."

Whitlock recorded four solo albums during the 1970s, among them Bobby Whitlock and Raw Velvet, and contributed to albums by Clapton, Dr John and the Rolling Stones. Other than occasional session work, he withdrew from music until releasing It's About Time in 1999. Following his return, Whitlock recorded and performed with his wife, CoCo Carmel, and from 2006 onwards with other musicians based in Austin, Texas. Among his and Carmel's projects, Other Assorted Love Songs, Live from Whitney Chapel contains acoustic interpretations of songs originally recorded by Derek and the Dominos.

== Life and career ==
=== Early career 1965–68 ===
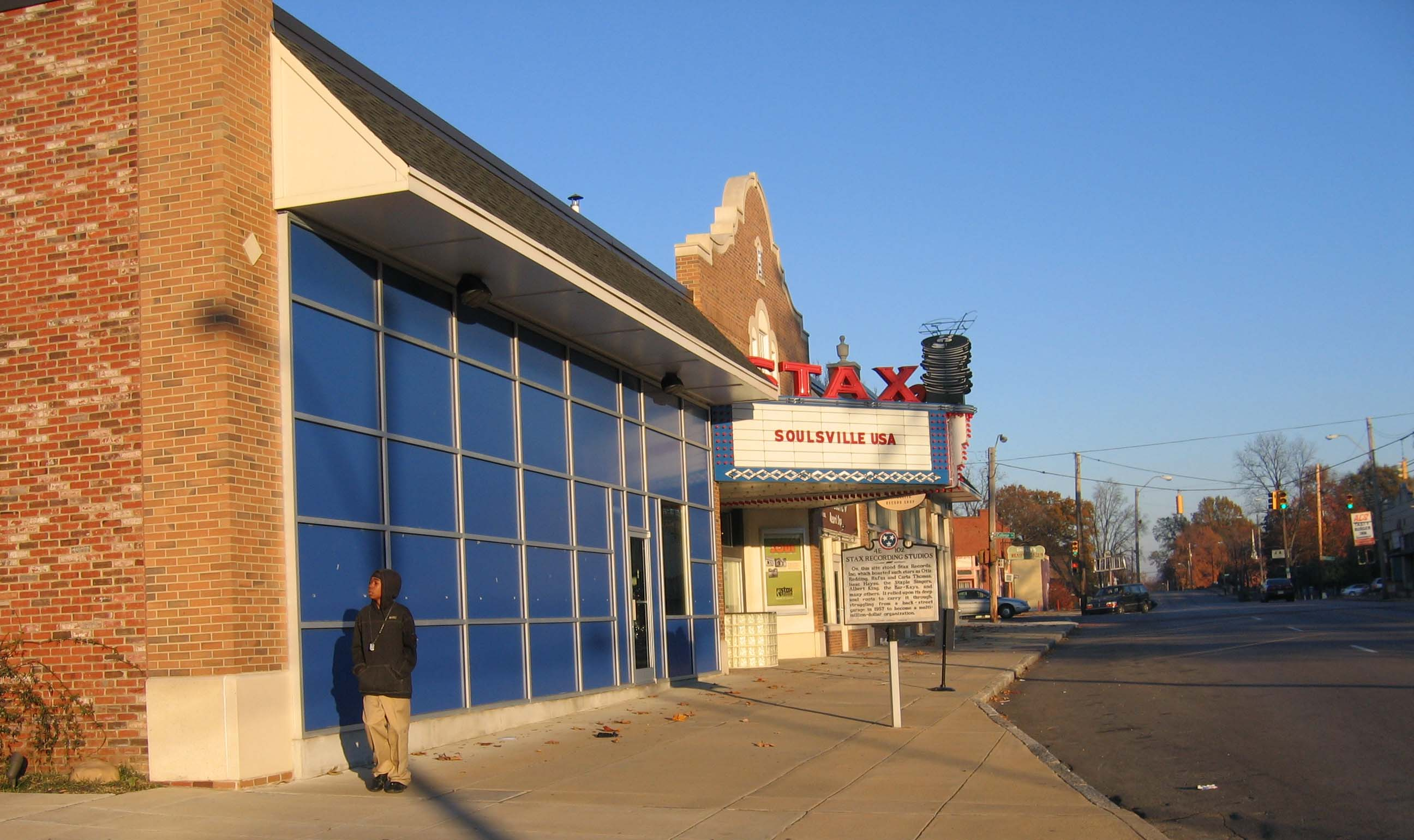
The Stax Museum in Memphis, a replica of the now-demolished Stax studio, where Whitlock spent part of his teenage years

Robert Stanley Whitlock was born in Memphis, Tennessee, on March 18, 1948. In an article for Mojo magazine in May 2011, music journalist Phil Sutcliffe described Whitlock as learning to play the Hammond organ "peering over Booker T's shoulder at Stax studios". While still a teenager, Whitlock befriended acts associated with Stax Records, including Albert King, Sam & Dave, the Staples Singers, and Booker T. & the M.G.'s, and was the first white artist signed to the label. His first contribution to a recording was in 1967, when he supplied handclaps on Sam & Dave's single "I Thank You".

Between 1965 and 1968, Whitlock performed regularly in the Memphis area, playing organ with local soul band the Short Cuts before forming the Counts. In his 2010 autobiography, Whitlock writes of this period in Memphis: "It was a great time and town for music then, especially soul music. It was real rhythm and blues. Albert King R&B, that's what I'm talking about. It was loose and all about music everywhere that you turned." With established Stax musicians such as Steve Cropper as his mentor, and Donald "Duck" Dunn and Don Nix preparing to produce a pop album by him on a Stax subsidiary label, Whitlock instead left Memphis after meeting the husband-and-wife team Delaney and Bonnie Bramlett. Whitlock recalled that he was performing at a club with the Counts when the Bramletts invited him to join a soul-revue band they were forming in Los Angeles.

=== Delaney & Bonnie 1968–70 ===
Whitlock contributed on keyboards and vocals to two Delaney & Bonnie albums in 1969, Home and Accept No Substitute. Their touring band, known as Delaney & Bonnie and Friends, included musicians he would continue to work with on projects through to the early 1970s: bassist Carl Radle; drummers Jim Keltner and Jim Gordon; and a horn section comprising Bobby Keys and Jim Price. Another member was Eric Clapton, who joined the Friends as lead guitarist midway through a U.S. tour in July–August 1969. On this tour, Delaney & Bonnie were supporting Clapton's short-lived supergroup Blind Faith, with Steve Winwood. Clapton later described Whitlock as "without doubt the most energetic sideman I had ever seen". Along with all the other members of Delaney & Bonnie, Whitlock flew to England in November 1969 to prepare for a highly publicized European tour, financed by Clapton.

In his autobiography, Whitlock states that their arrival in London changed the dynamics within the band, as the Bramletts now considered themselves "big stars" and the ones solely responsible for the new-found success. Once in London, Whitlock participated in a session for a solo album by the American soul singer Doris Troy, on the Beatles' Apple record label. The album, Doris Troy (1970), was co-produced by George Harrison, who, having championed Delaney & Bonnie in the British press, accepted Clapton's invitation to join the tour. Through Harrison, Whitlock and the band then played at John Lennon's "Peace for Christmas" concert, held at the Lyceum Ballroom in London on December 15, 1969. (Note: Delaney & Bonnie and Friends' performance with Lennon and others, dubbed the "Plastic Ono Supergroup", was included on the Live Jam disc of Lennon and Yoko Ono's double album Some Time in New York City in 1972.)

In early 1970, Delaney & Bonnie and Friends backed Clapton on his debut solo album, Eric Clapton, and toured America with the English guitarist. After arguments with the Bramletts over money, the other Friends quit the band and joined Leon Russell on Joe Cocker's Mad Dogs and Englishmen tour. Whitlock continued to work with Delaney & Bonnie until April, following sessions for their album To Bonnie from Delaney (1970). (Note: Whitlock performed on Delaney & Bonnie's 1971 studio album, Motel Shot, through the inclusion of songs like "Goin' Down the Road Feelin' Bad", which were recorded before his departure.) On Cropper's advice, he then returned to England to stay with Clapton at his home, Hurtwood Edge, in Surrey.

=== Derek and the Dominos 1970–71 ===
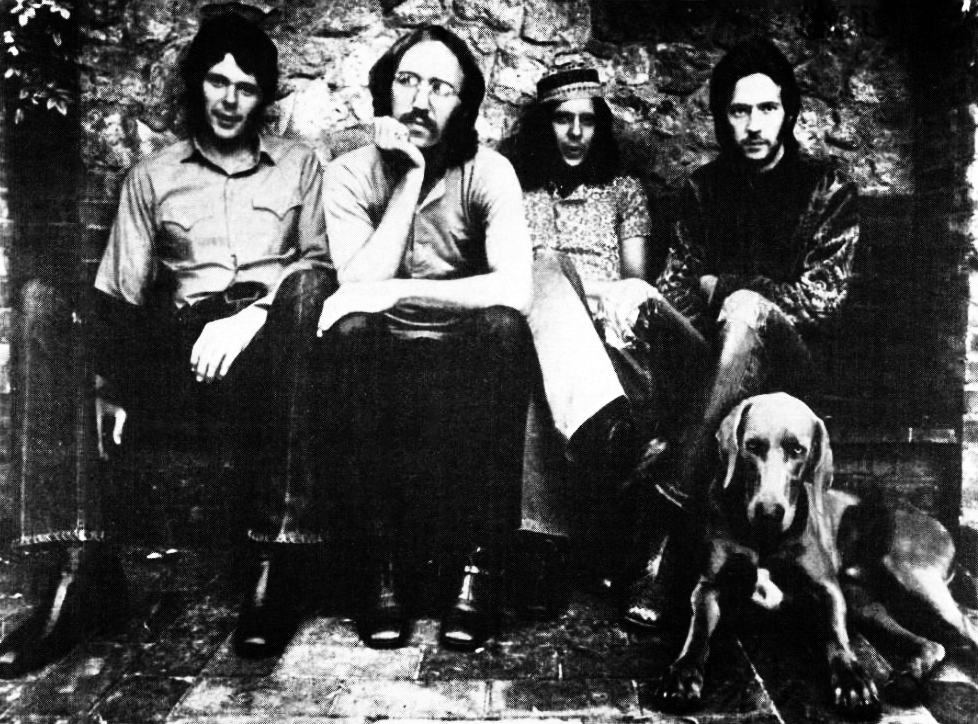
Derek and the Dominos in 1970 (from left to right): Jim Gordon, Carl Radle, Whitlock and Eric Clapton

Seeking to start a new band, Whitlock and Clapton reunited with Radle and Gordon at a session for P. P. Arnold, before going on to back Harrison on his 1970 triple album All Things Must Pass. Whitlock described the latter sessions as "spectacular in every way". Although individual contributions remain hard to ascertain, due to the large cast of musicians on the Phil Spector-produced recording, Harrison biographer Simon Leng identifies Whitlock as one of two "core keyboard players" on All Things Must Pass. Having traditionally favored Hammond organ as his keyboard instrument, Whitlock played piano for the first time on a studio recording during the session for Harrison's "Beware of Darkness". (Note: In his autobiography, Whitlock writes that, aside from keyboards, he also played tubular bells on the album and arranged Keys and Price's horn parts. Leng also credits Whitlock and Clapton as backing vocalists on songs such as the title track and "Let It Down".)

In June 1970, early in the All Things Must Pass sessions, Clapton, Whitlock, Radle and Gordon formed the blues-rock band Derek and the Dominos. Their first release was a US-only single, "Tell the Truth", produced by Spector and written primarily by Whitlock. In August, once their work on Harrison's album was complete, Derek and the Dominos toured the UK, playing to small venues. That summer, Whitlock and his bandmates also participated in London sessions for Dr John's album The Sun, Moon & Herbs (1971).

Unhappy with Spector's treatment of their sound, the band went to Criteria Studios in Miami to work with producer Tom Dowd, on what became a double album – Layla and Other Assorted Love Songs (1970). The album featured substantial contributions by Duane Allman, as well as by Dave Mason. As well as a remake of "Tell the Truth", the album included six other songs written or co-written by Whitlock, including "Anyday", "Why Does Love Got to Be So Sad?", "Keep on Growing" and "Thorn Tree in the Garden". In addition, Whitlock helped Clapton finish "Bell Bottom Blues", although he was not initially credited as a co-writer on that song. "Keep on Growing" and "Thorn Tree in the Garden" featured Whitlock on lead vocals, while on other tracks he and Clapton shared the singing in a style reminiscent of Sam & Dave.

After the recording [of Layla], we were on the road, and we scored an enormous amount of drugs to take with us. That was the beginning of the end ... [Still], on our worst night we were the best band on the planet. It was impossible for us to play badly.

— Bobby Whitlock discussing the demise of Derek and the Dominos, December 2006

Adding to the power of the Dominos' music, Clapton's inspiration for the songs on Layla was his unrequited love for Pattie Boyd, Harrison's wife. Whitlock began a relationship with Boyd's sister Paula at this time, and was therefore, as he described it, "in the inner circle ... in the middle of it with all of them". He comments on a musical dialogue between Harrison and Clapton in their songs: "There were subliminal messages, going back and forth, between two good friends as a way of healing and setting each other free ... I have always known that the better part of those songs [on All Things Must Pass] were directed to Eric, just like Eric's were to George on the Layla record."

Between October and December 1970, Derek and the Dominos toured the United States in support of Layla. The Elton John Band was their opening act. In his autobiography, Elton John said, "They were phenomenal. From the side of the stage, I took mental notes of their performance ... it was their keyboard player Bobby Whitlock that I watched like a hawk. ... You watched and you learned, from people that had more experience than you." But the Layla album made little commercial impact on release, failing to chart in the UK. Clapton's despondency at being rejected by Boyd, the band's drug consumption, and personal conflicts between the members, particularly with Gordon, all contributed to the break-up of the Dominos in May 1971.

=== Solo career 1971–76 ===
Whitlock recorded his debut solo album, Bobby Whitlock (1972), at London's Olympic Studios in 1971, with Andy Johns as his co-producer. The recording took place before the abortive sessions for the Dominos' second studio album; a press release for the 2013 reissue of Bobby Whitlock gives the recording date as starting in March 1971, while Dominos biographer Jan Reid writes of sessions happening in January that year. Whitlock played acoustic or electric rhythm guitar on much of the album, which also included musical contributions from all the Dominos (often recorded separately), the Bramletts, Harrison, Keys, Price and Keltner. Among its tracks, "Where There's a Will" was a Whitlock–Bonnie Bramlett collaboration that had featured in Delaney & Bonnie's live shows in 1969–70, and "A Day Without Jesus" was co-written by Whitlock and Don Nix. The record peaked at number 140 on the US Billboard 200 chart, the same magazine praising it as "a persuasively powerful first album".

Whitlock's second solo album, also on ABC-Dunhill Records, was Raw Velvet, released in November 1972. It included appearances by Clapton and Gordon, on "Hello L.A., Bye Bye Birmingham", although the majority of the album, including another remake of "Tell the Truth", featured new associates such as guitarist Rick Vito and ex-Van der Graaf Generator bassist Keith Ellis. The album was co-produced by Jimmy Miller, whose connection with the Rolling Stones led to Whitlock making an uncredited contribution to the band's Exile on Main St. double album (1972). By this point, Layla's title track had become a hit song, following its release as a single to promote the History of Eric Clapton compilation (1972), leading to a critical reappraisal of Derek and the Dominos and belated commercial success. A 1970-recorded live album, In Concert, was similarly well-received when issued in January 1973. Raw Velvet peaked at number 190 on the Billboard 200, however, and it was Whitlock's last album to place on the chart.

You know I'm indirectly responsible for disco? [Clapton's manager] Robert Stigwood took the Dominos' money, used it to create RSO Records and record the Bee Gees. My deepest apologies to the entire music world.

— Bobby Whitlock, December 2006

His next solo album was One of a Kind, co-produced with Bill Halverson and released in 1975 on Capricorn Records. Rock Your Sox Off followed in 1976, opening with a new recording of "Why Does Love Got to Be So Sad?" Whitlock then withdrew from the music industry; he told Mojo contributor Harry Shapiro in 2001: "I had my own problems to deal with." Speaking to The Austin Chronicle in 2006, Whitlock said of his retirement, "It wasn't hard to stop, because there was nothing going on in music", and rued the popularity of disco.

=== Later career ===
For much of the 1980s and 1990s, Whitlock lived on a farm in Mississippi, raising his children, Ashley Faye, and Beau Elijah, and doing occasional session work. He had his own television show with Steve Cropper. A rare music release during this period was "Put Angels Around You", a duet with Scottish singer Maggie Bell, issued as a single in 1983 on Led Zeppelin's Swan Song Records.

In 1999, Whitlock resumed his solo career with It's About Time, which included contributions from Cropper and saxophonist Jim Horn. Michael Smith of AllMusic described the album as "one of Whitlock's most intriguing creations yet" and a "fine set from a musician we haven't heard enough from in recent years". In April 2000, Whitlock reunited with Clapton to play live on the BBC's Later... with Jools Holland. The following year, he contributed piano to Sweet Tea by blues guitarist Buddy Guy.

In 2003, Whitlock and his partner, musician CoCo Carmel, collaborated on Other Assorted Love Songs, a live album that again revisited the Dominos' songs, as well as including Harrison's "All Things Must Pass". Music critic Bruce Eder praised the album, writing: "The classic pieces [from Layla] hold up magnificently ... [H]ere, acoustic guitar and piano are more than sufficient accompaniment and, indeed, coupled with Whitlock's powerful singing and range, make a strong case for these being the definitive versions."

Whitlock and Carmel married on December 24, 2005, in Nashville, Tennessee, and moved to Austin, Texas, in 2006. The couple worked with musicians such as David Grissom, Stephen Bruton and Brannen Temple, and special guest Willie Nelson, on the album Lovers (2008) and Metamorphosis (2010), another live recording. Released on the Domino label, Lovers included a song that Whitlock had begun writing with Clapton in the early 1970s, "Dear Veronica", and a remake of "Layla" that omitted the Gordon-composed ending, which Whitlock had never thought suitable for the track. Vintage (2009) compiled his unreleased songs from the 1990s and included appearances by Cropper and Horn. Whitlock's solo album My Time (2009) featured musical contributions from Cropper, Keltner, Horn, Tim Drummond and Buddy Miller. His subsequent releases with Carmel include Esoteric (2012) and another live album, Carnival: Live in Austin (2013). In 2013, in connection with the release of the latter album, Whitlock and Carmel gave an interview for Tracy Thibodeaux's Pods o' Pop in which he spoke in depth about the formation of Derek and the Dominos, composing with Clapton, and playing on Harrison's All Things Must Pass.

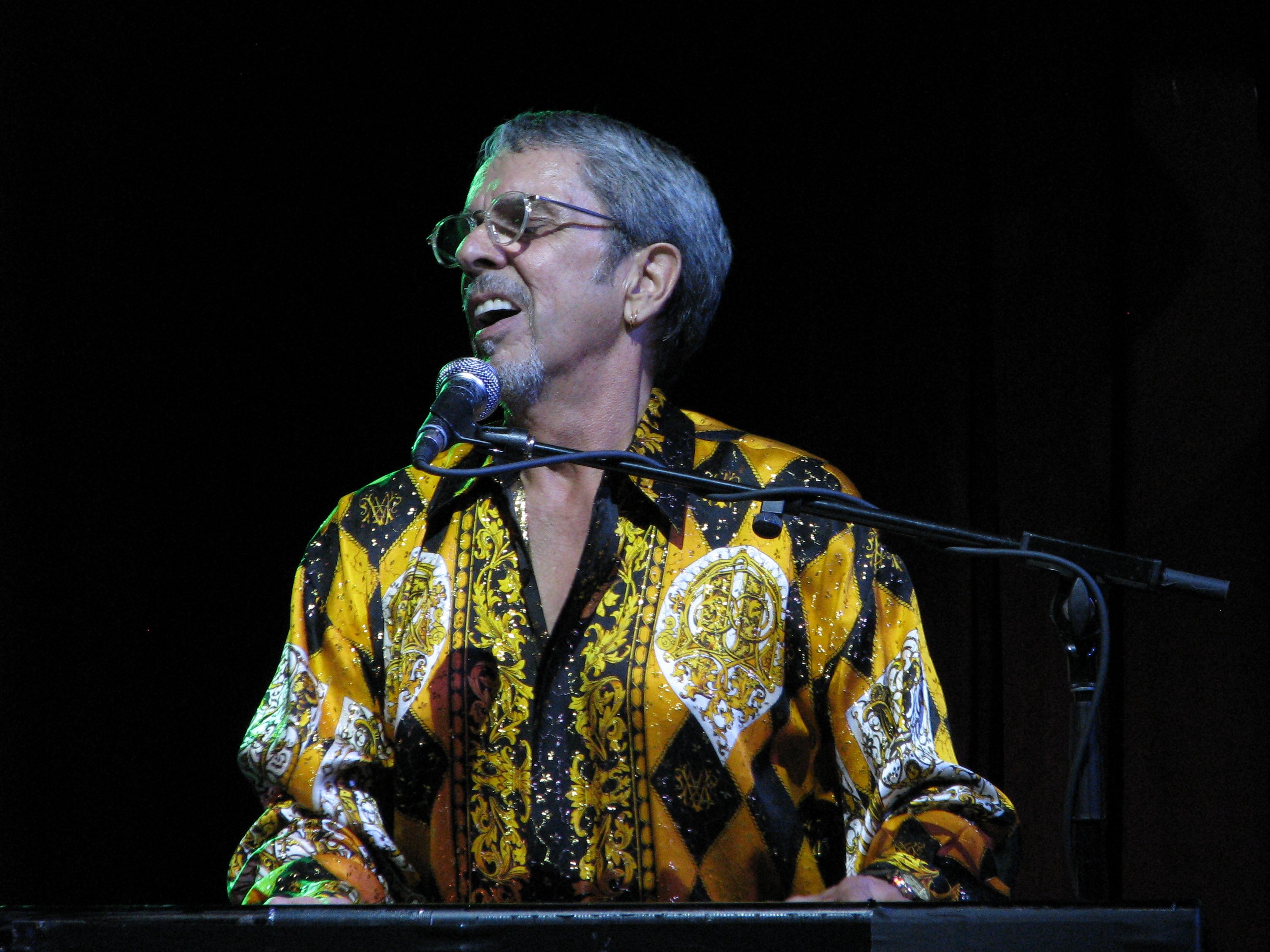
Whitlock in 2015

In 2010, Bobby Whitlock: A Rock 'n' Roll Autobiography, written with music historian Marc Roberty, was published, with a foreword by Eric Clapton. Whitlock's first two solo albums appeared, remastered, as Where There's a Will, There's a Way: The ABC-Dunhill Recordings, released by Future Day Records in September 2013. In 2015, Bobby Whitlock and Coco Carmel's "The Just Us Tour 2015" visited the eastern and mid-western United States, using guest guitarists in each city. The tour ended with a performance at The Jass Blues Festival in Dhaka, Bangladesh.

=== Death ===
Whitlock died from cancer at his home in Ozona, Texas, on August 10, 2025, at the age of 77. He is survived by wife Coco Whitlock, Children Ashley Faye Brown Whitlock, Beau Elijah Whitlock, and Tim Whitlock Kelly.

== Discography ==
Solo albums

- Bobby Whitlock (1972)
- Raw Velvet (1972)
- One of a Kind (1975)
- Rock Your Sox Off (1976)
- It's About Time (1999)
- Other Assorted Love Songs, Live from Whitney Chapel (2003) – live album, with CoCo Carmel
- Lovers (2008) – with Carmel
- Lovers: The Master Demos (2009) – with Carmel
- Vintage (2009)
- My Time (2009)
- Metamorphosis (2010) – live album, with Carmel
- Esoteric (2012) – with Carmel
- Carnival: Live in Austin (2013) – live album, with Carmel
- Where There's a Will, There's a Way: The ABC-Dunhill Recordings (2013)

Other notable recordings

- Delaney & Bonnie, Home (1969)
- Delaney & Bonnie, Accept No Substitute (1969)
- Delaney & Bonnie, On Tour with Eric Clapton (1970)
- Eric Clapton, Eric Clapton (1970)
- Doris Troy, Doris Troy (1970)
- Delaney & Bonnie, To Bonnie from Delaney (1970)
- George Harrison, All Things Must Pass (1970)
- Derek and the Dominos, Layla and Other Assorted Love Songs (1970)
- Delaney & Bonnie, Motel Shot (1971)
- John Simon, John Simon's Album (1971)
- Dr John, The Sun, Moon & Herbs (1971)
- Eric Clapton, The History of Eric Clapton (1972)
- Derek and the Dominos, In Concert (1973)
- Manassas, Down the Road (1973)

== See also ==
- Music of Austin

== Sources ==
- John Blaney, John Lennon: Listen to This Book, Paper Jukebox (London, 2005; ISBN 978-0-9544528-1-0).
- Eric Clapton, Eric Clapton: The Autobiography, Random House (New York, NY, 2008; ISBN 978-0-09-950549-5).
- Gary Graff & Daniel Durchholz (eds), MusicHound Rock: The Essential Album Guide, Visible Ink Press (Farmington Hills, MI, 1999; ISBN 1-57859-061-2).
- John Harris, "A Quiet Storm", Mojo, July 2001.
- Simon Leng, While My Guitar Gently Weeps: The Music of George Harrison, Hal Leonard (Milwaukee, WI, 2006; ISBN 1-4234-0609-5).
- Romanowski, Patricia, ed. (1995). The new Rolling Stone encyclopedia of rock & roll. A Rolling Stone Press Book (Completely rev. and updated, [2. ed.] ed.). New York: Fireside. ISBN 978-0-684-81044-7.
- Chris O'Dell with Katherine Ketcham, Miss O'Dell: My Hard Days and Long Nights with The Beatles, The Stones, Bob Dylan, Eric Clapton, and the Women They Loved, Touchstone (New York, NY, 2009; ISBN 978-1-4165-9093-4).
- Jan Reid, Layla and Other Assorted Love Songs by Derek and the Dominos, Rodale (New York, NY, 2006; ISBN 978-1-59486-369-1).
- Michael Schumacher, Crossroads: The Life and Music of Eric Clapton, Hyperion (New York, NY, 1995; ISBN 0-7868-6074-X).
- Whitlock, Bobby; Clapton, Eric; Roberty, Marc (2011). Bobby Whitlock: a rock 'n' roll autobiography. Jefferson, N.C: McFarland. ISBN 978-0-7864-6190-5.
- Whitlock, Bobby; Roberty, Marc (January 10, 2014). Bobby Whitlock: A Rock 'n' Roll Autobiography. McFarland. ISBN 978-0-7864-6190-5.
