= Only You Know and I Know =

1970 single by Dave Mason

Single by Dave Mason

from the album Alone Together
- B-side: "Sad and Deep as You"
- Released: July 1970
- Recorded: 1970, Los Angeles
- Length: 4:05
- Label: Blue Thumb
- Songwriter: Dave Mason

Dave Mason singles chronology
"Only You Know and I Know" (1970)	"Satin Red and Black Velvet Woman" (1970)

"Only You Know and I Know" is a song written and originally recorded by the English musician Dave Mason in 1970. It is a track from his debut solo album, Alone Together. The song was his first charting single, and it became a modest hit for him in the U.S. and Canada.

== Delaney & Bonnie version ==
"Only You Know and I Know"

Single by Delaney & Bonnie

from the album D&B Together
- B-side: "God Knows I Love You"
- Released: May 1971
- Recorded: 1971
- Label: Atco
- Songwriter: Dave Mason
- Producer: Delaney Bramlett

Delaney & Bonnie singles chronology
"Never Ending Song of Love" (1971)	"Only You Know and I Know" (1971)	"Move 'Em Out" (1972)

"Only You Know and I Know" was covered by the American duo and then-married couple Delaney & Bonnie in 1971 and released as a single and included on their album D&B Together the following year. It reached the Top 20 in the U.S. and the Top 10 in Canada.

== Chart history ==
=== Weekly charts ===
Dave Mason

Chart (1970)	Peak position
Canada RPM Top Singles	32
U.S. Billboard Hot 100	42
U.S. Cash Box Top 100	37

Delaney & Bonnie

Chart (1971)	Peak position
Australia (Kent Music Report)	85
Canada RPM Top Singles	7
U.S. Billboard Hot 100	20
U.S. Billboard Adult Contemporary	32
U.S. Cash Box Top 100	18
