= Carl Radle =

American bassist (1942–1980)

Background information
- Born: Carl Dean Radle; June 18, 1942; Tulsa, Oklahoma, U.S.
- Died: May 30, 1980 (aged 37) Claremore, Oklahoma, U.S.
- Genres: Blues rock; rock and roll; folk rock
- Occupation: Musician
- Instruments: Bass
- Years active: 1965–1979
- Formerly of: Gary Lewis & the Playboys; Derek and the Dominos

Carl Dean Radle (June 18, 1942 – May 30, 1980) was an American bassist who toured and recorded with many of the most influential recording artists of the late 1960s and 1970s. Radle is best remembered for his work with Eric Clapton from 1969 to 1979, including as a member of his band Derek and the Dominos. Radle is sometimes called Clapton's "right hand man" as he helped him during dark periods of his life battling drug addiction.

Radle had first found fame as the bassist for pop band Gary Lewis & the Playboys from 1965 to 1967. In 1969 he joined the session group who backed husband and wife recording duo Delaney & Bonnie, which is where he met Eric Clapton and formed Derek and the Dominos in 1970. Radle played on all of Clapton's solo material released in the 1970s before Clapton fired all of his backing members in 1979.

Over the course of his career, Radle played on a number of gold and platinum singles and albums and garnered the respect of many musicians. Radle died in 1980 from organ failure caused by effects from hard drug and alcohol consumption and was posthumously inducted to the Oklahoma Music Hall of Fame in 2006.

== Early life ==
Carl Dean Radle was born in Tulsa, Oklahoma, in 1942. He picked up many instruments as a teen including the clarinet, piano and guitar before sticking with the bass guitar at age fifteen.

== Career ==
=== Early career ===
Radle's professional career started out when Leon Russell, a fellow Tulsa sound musician, offered him his entry into the music industry, inviting him out to California.

His big break came along in the mid-1960s, as the bass player in Gary Lewis & the Playboys. In 1967, Gary Lewis was drafted into the U.S. Army, he ended the band and Radle started working as a session musician.

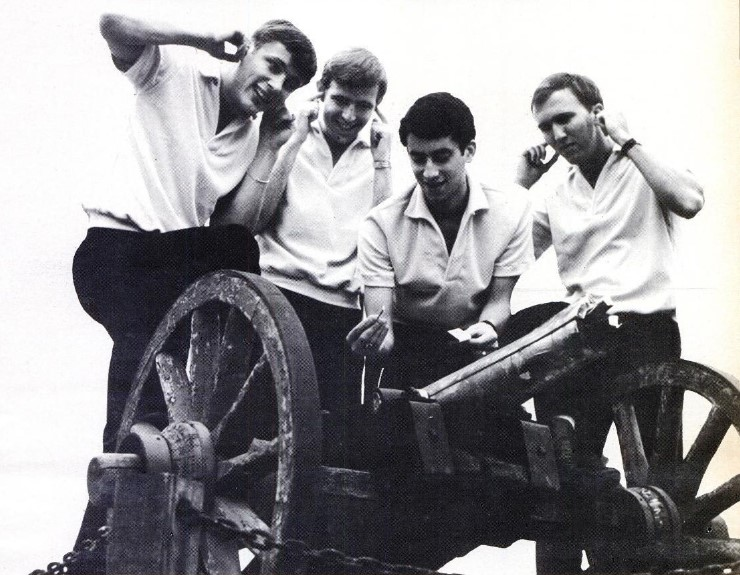
Radle on the right with Gary Lewis & the Playboys in 1965

Carl also was a member of Colours, a psychedelic cult band from Dot Records for whom he played on the first album and guest appeared on the second. In 1970, Radle joined Joe Cocker's Mad Dogs and Englishmen tour.

Radle was a session musician for many of the most famous blues rock and rock and roll artists in the 1970s, including Rita Coolidge and Kris Kristofferson. Over the two-year period before the release of the album The Concert for Bangladesh, Radle recorded albums with Dave Mason, J.J. Cale, George Harrison, Joe Cocker, Leon Russell, and Buddy Guy, among others.

=== Eric Clapton ===
Radle was best known for his long association with Eric Clapton, starting in 1969 with Delaney and Bonnie and Friends and continuing in 1970 with Derek and the Dominos, recording with drummer Jim Gordon, guitarist Duane Allman, and keyboardist Bobby Whitlock. In August 1971, they appeared with Leon Russell at George Harrison's The Concert for Bangladesh and its film The Concert for Bangladesh.

Radle was pointed out by Clapton as being the one who started the idea of making a band; Clapton said in a 2004 interview that he was dividing time between his house in Surrey and Delaney's house in Sherman Oaks, Los Angeles, when he received a phone call from Radle, in which he told Eric "we're (Radle, Gordon, Whitlock) leaving Delaney. Are you interested in having a band?" It was also revealed in that 2004 interview that Radle and the rest left because Delaney refused to give them a raise.

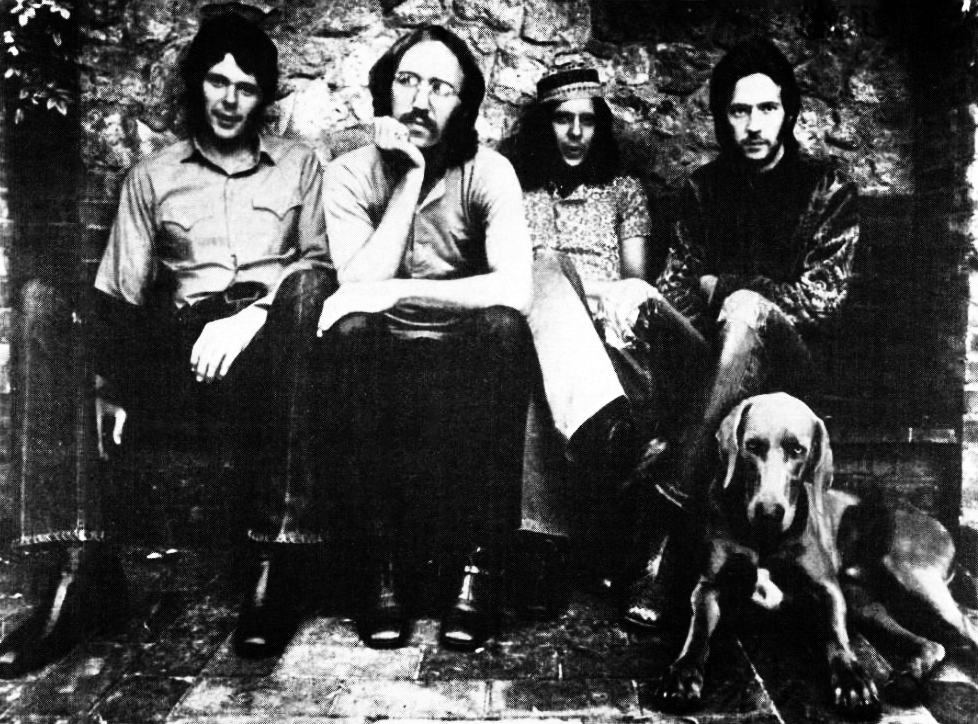
Derek and the Dominos in 1970 (from left to right): Jim Gordon, Radle, Bobby Whitlock and Eric Clapton

He worked on all of Clapton's solo projects from 1970 until 1979 and was a member of Clapton's touring band, Eric Clapton & His Band, from 1974 to 1979, when Clapton fired all of his backing musicians. Radle was instrumental in facilitating Clapton's return to recording and touring in 1974 and is quoted as being Clapton's "right hand man". During Clapton's three-year hiatus, Radle furnished him with a supply of tapes of musicians with whom he had been working. Dick Sims and Jamie Oldaker were the core of Clapton's band during the 1970s. Radle served as more than a sideman, acting also as arranger on several songs, notably "Motherless Children". Radle earned credit as an associate producer of Clapton's album No Reason to Cry.

In 1979, Radle, Dick Sims and Jamie Oldaker, who were Clapton's backing band, were told through telegrams that he had fired them from being in his backing band.

== Death ==
Radle died at his home in Claremore, Oklahoma in May 1980, from the effects of alcohol and narcotics; he was 37.

== Legacy ==
In 1991, Clapton remembered Radle in an interview saying he was like a brother to him and also spoke about how Carl helped Clapton during a period in the 70s when he was living in seclusion and addicted to heroin. In later years he also felt regret for firing Radle in 1979 even though he helped him through dark times and regretted not seeing Radle again until his death less than a year later and claimed he felt responsible for parts of his death. In 2008, Clapton called Radle and Jim Gordon as "the most powerful rhythm section I have ever played with. They were absolutely brilliant."

He was posthumously inducted to the Oklahoma Music Hall of Fame in 2006.

Radle was described in an article as "America's Paul McCartney" due to him being a popular and skilled bass guitarist, his work with Beatle George Harrison and because he was also born on the same day as McCartney, June 18, 1942.

== Discography ==
With Gary Lewis & the Playboys

- A Session with Gary Lewis and the Playboys (1965)
- Everybody Loves a Clown (1965)
- She's Just My Style (1965)
- Hits Again (1966)
- (You Don't Have To) Paint Me a Picture (1966)

With John Lee Hooker

- Live at Cafe Au Go Go (1967)
- Endless Boogie (1971)

With Derek and the Dominos

- Layla and Other Assorted Love Songs (1970)
- In Concert (1973)
- The Layla Sessions: 20th Anniversary Edition (1990) (poshumous)
- Live at the Fillmore (1994) (posthumous)

With Eric Clapton

- Eric Clapton (1970)
- 461 Ocean Boulevard (1974)
- E. C. Was Here (1975)
- There's One in Every Crowd (1975)
- No Reason to Cry (1976)
- Slowhand (1977)
- Backless (1978)

With Delaney & Bonnie

- Home (1969)
- The Original Delaney & Bonnie & Friends (1969)
- On Tour with Eric Clapton (1970)
- Motel Shot (1971)
- D&B Together (1972)

With Dave Mason

- Alone Together (1970)
- It's Like You Never Left (1973)

With George Harrison

- All Things Must Pass (1970)
- The Concert for Bangladesh (1971)
- Extra Texture (Read All About It) (1975)

With Leon Russell

- Leon Russell and the Shelter People (1971)
- Carney (1972)
- Hank Wilson's Back (1973)
- Stop All That Jazz (1974)
- Will O' the Wisp (1975)
- Live in Japan (1975)

With Marc Benno

- Minnows (1971)
- Ambush (1972)
- Lost In Austin (1979)

With JJ Cale

- Naturally (1971)
- 5 (1979)

With Freddie King

- Texas Cannonball (1972)
- Woman Across the River (1973)
- Burglar (1974)

Others:

1968

- Soul Folk In Action — The Staple Singers
- Daughters of Albion — Daughters of Albion
- Colours — Colours

1969

- Harlan County — Jim Ford

1970

- Mad Dogs & Englishmen — Joe Cocker

1971

- The Sun, Moon & Herbs — Dr. John
- País Tropical — Sérgio Mendes
- Klatu Berrada Nitku — Dependables
- John Simon's Album — John Simon
- Asylum Choir II — The Asylum Choir

1972

- Ambush – Marc Benno
- Willis Alan Ramsey — Willis Alan Ramsey
- Through the Eyes of a Horn — Jim Horn
- The Lady's Not for Sale — Rita Coolidge
- Play the Blues — Buddy Guy/Junior Wells
- Bobby Keys — Bobby Keys

1973

- Essence to Essence — Donovan
- Angel Clare — Art Garfunkel

1976

- Joey Stec — Joey Stec
