= Barry Feinstein =

American photographer and filmmaker (1931–2011)

- Born: February 4, 1931; Philadelphia, Pennsylvania, U.S.
- Died: October 20, 2011 (aged 80); Woodstock, New York, U.S.
- Occupations: Photographer, filmmaker
- Years active: 1950s–2011
- Spouses: Mary Travers (m. 1963; div. 1968) Carol Wayne (m. 1969; div. 1974) Judith Jamison (m. 1978)

Barry Feinstein (February 4, 1931 – October 20, 2011) was an American photographer and filmmaker, known for his photographs of 1950s Hollywood, the 1960s music scene, and his close personal and professional relationships with celebrities like Bob Dylan and Steve McQueen. Feinstein produced over 500 album covers, featuring his photographs and graphic designs.

== Early life ==
Feinstein was born on February 4, 1931, in Philadelphia, the only child of Rose and David Feinstein. He enrolled at the University of Miami but left after a year, later joining the Coast Guard.

== Career ==
In 1955, Feinstein worked at the Atlantic City Race Track. In 1955, Feinstein was engaged as an assistant photographer at Life magazine.

In his late twenties, Feinstein was hired as a production intern at Columbia Pictures, later a studio photographer.

He subsequently became a photographer in Hollywood, where he worked with Marlene Dietrich, Judy Garland, Charlton Heston, Jayne Mansfield, and Steve McQueen. His photos of celebrities, as well such politicians as John F. Kennedy and Richard Nixon, appeared in national publications, including Time, Esquire, and Newsweek.

In 1966, Feinstein accompanied Bob Dylan on his tour of England, and shot the cover photos of numerous albums by Janis Joplin, George Harrison, the Rolling Stones, and others.

Feinstein was a cameraman on the 1967 concert film, Monterey Pop. During Mardi Gras in late February 1968, Feinstein, Les Blank, Baird Bryant and others were in New Orleans as part of the original "underground filmmakers" crew of Easy Rider that produced the acid trip segment of the movie on 16 mm film, but was replaced afterwards by a more experienced crew with 35 mm movie film.

In 1968 was the director-producer-cameraman on the music-zeitgeist movie You Are What You Eat.

In 1974, he again toured with Dylan, this time with The Band, around the United States.

== Later career ==
An accident in 1993 affected Feinstein's ability to operate cameras. In 2008, he published two books; the first included 23 of his early Hollywood photos together with Dylan poems written in 1964; and the second, a collection of photos from the Dylan concert tours. His photographs from the 1966 Dylan tour were exhibited in the National Portrait Gallery in London in 2009 and a retrospective exhibition of his work was shown at Fondazione Carispezia in Italy in 2019.

== Personal life ==
In 1963, Feinstein married Mary Travers, the singer-songwriter and member of the folk music group Peter, Paul and Mary, with whom he had a daughter, Alicia (b. 1966). In 1968 Feinstein and Travers divorced. In 1969, he married actress Carol Wayne, with whom he had a son, Alex (b. 1970); he and Wayne divorced in 1974. Feinstein married Judith Jamison. Feinstein died on October 20, 2011, at the age of 80 in Woodstock, New York.
