= Hold Your Head High =

Hold Your Head High may refer to:

- "Hold Your Head High", a song by AlunaGeorge from the 2016 album I Remember
- "Hold Your Head High", a song by Heartless Bastards from the 2009 album The Mountain
- "Blackbird (Hold Your Head High)", a song by Stoney Edwards

== See also ==
- "Hold Your Head Up", a 1971 song by Argent
