= Parted Ways =

Single by Heartless Bastards

from the album Arrow
- Released: April 12, 2012
- Genre: Folk rock
- Length: 4:58
- Label: Partisan
- Songwriter(s): Erika Wennerstrom

Heartless Bastards singles chronology
"Parted Ways" (2012)	"Gates of Dawn" (2015)

"Parted Ways" is a single from the album Arrow by Heartless Bastards. It is the first song by the band to chart.

== Charts ==
Chart (2013)	Peak position
US Adult Alternative Songs (Billboard)	30
