= Apple Jam =

Bonus disc on George Harrison's 1970 All Things Must Pass album

The Tom Wilkes-designed face label for Apple Jam

Apple Jam is the third LP (often described as a "bonus" disc) included in English rock musician George Harrison's 1970 triple album All Things Must Pass. It consists of four instrumental jams, three of which were recorded during the album sessions, and "It's Johnny's Birthday", a 30th birthday tribute to John Lennon. The disc was Apple Records' way of placating record buyers for the high retail price of All Things Must Pass, which was one of the first triple albums in rock history. It was given a dedicated design by Tom Wilkes, with a logo depicting a jam jar and apple leaves.

Two of the jams date from an 18 June 1970 session that marked the official formation of Eric Clapton's band Derek and the Dominos as recording artists. Augmented by Harrison and guitarist Dave Mason, and produced by Phil Spector, the group recorded songs intended for their debut single that same day. Other tracks on Apple Jam include musical contributions from Billy Preston, Klaus Voormann, Ginger Baker, Gary Wright and Bobby Keys. Music critics have traditionally viewed the jams as dispensable next to the two LPs of songs. Some writers nevertheless recognise the disc's historical importance as a document of Derek and the Dominos' first recording session.

== Background ==
According to bassist Klaus Voormann, a friend of the Beatles since their years in Hamburg and one of many musicians who played on George Harrison's All Things Must Pass album, jamming was commonplace during the sessions and indicative of the free spirit that characterised the project. Aside from giving Harrison the opportunity to record several songs of his that had been overlooked for inclusion on the Beatles' releases, the album allowed him to include longer instrumental breaks than was typically the case in his former band's work; he also welcomed the chance to record with the musicians he had met while a guest on Delaney & Bonnie and Friends' European tour in December 1969. Harrison recalled that early in the All Things Must Pass sessions, he and his fellow musicians would improvise on an idea and then ask to hear the jam played back, only to discover that the engineer had failed to capture the performance on tape. As a result, a stereo tape was left running throughout the subsequent sessions to capture any impromptu recordings, leading to the tracks that appear on Apple Jam.

All Things Must Pass was originally scheduled for release with the catalogue number STBO-639, indicating a two-record set. In a December 2000 interview with Billboard editor Timothy White, Harrison explained the addition of the Apple Jam disc: "For the jams, I didn't want to just throw [them] in the cupboard, and yet at the same time it wasn't part of the record; that's why I put it on a separate label to go in the package as a kind of bonus." He said he came to appreciate the quality of the jams when mixing the album, especially the "fire" in Eric Clapton's guitar playing. The title of the third disc was a pun combining the idea of a jam session and the Beatles' Apple Studio to create a reference to a fruit preserve.

== Musical content ==
=== Side A ===
==== "Out of the Blue" ====
"Out of the Blue" opens abruptly, with the musicians already playing a mid-tempo groove. Lasting eleven minutes, the jam is a blues instrumental; in author Simon Leng's description, the improvisation is achieved through guitar riffs and "shifting dynamics" over a single-chord theme. The contributors include Bobby Keys and Jim Price, both of whom began working as the Rolling Stones' horn section around this time. Although Harrison credited Clapton as the second guitarist on the track, the part was played by Voormann. According to Voormann, "He thought it was Eric, because I was playing a little thing like Eric." The other musicians were keyboard players Bobby Whitlock and Gary Wright, bassist Carl Radle and drummer Jim Gordon. Originally 20 minutes in length and referred to in Harrison's notes as "Jam (3)", it was recorded at EMI Studios on 2 July 1970, the penultimate day of full band sessions for All Things Must Pass.

Leng compares "Out of the Blue" to the extended jams typical of the San Francisco scene and comments that many of those bands would have issued it as a genuine album track. Beatles historian Bruce Spizer highlights Harrison's guitar playing, the "rollicking" piano, and Keys' saxophone contribution, which he likens to the "jam ending" on the Rolling Stones' 1971 track "Can't You Hear Me Knocking". (Note: Although Spizer lists Whitlock as the pianist, Whitlock says he played Hammond organ, his preferred keyboard instrument. Whitlock comments on "Out of the Blue": "I love how it gets completely spaced out at the end. Everyone is really listening to each other.") The musician credits also list journalist Al Aronowitz, who was in London to write a piece about the All Things Must Pass sessions for the New York Post. According to Spizer, Aronowitz most likely played percussion. (Note: When asked later what instrument he played on "Out of the Blue", Aronowitz shrugged and replied, "Typewriter?")

==== "It's Johnny's Birthday" ====
"It's Johnny's Birthday" is a 49-second track sung to the tune of Cliff Richard's 1968 hit "Congratulations" and delivered in a style that author Ian Inglis terms "music hall sing-along". Harrison recorded it for John Lennon's 30th birthday, after Yoko Ono, Lennon's wife, had requested a musical gift from him, Donovan and Janis Joplin to mark the occasion. Recording took place at EMI Studios on 7 October as Harrison was carrying out final mixing on All Things Must Pass.

The track features Harrison on vocals and all instruments – a carnival-style organ and two tracks of acoustic slide guitar – along with vocal contributions from Beatles aide Mal Evans and assistant engineer Eddie Klein. Harrison treated the recording with varispeed for comic effect. He presented Lennon with a tape of the song at EMI on 9 October, when Lennon was recording his song "Remember" in one of the studios there, with Voormann and Ringo Starr. (Note: The tape from the session captures Lennon and Starr's delight at Harrison's arrival. Seeing Harrison's slide guitar, Lennon asks, "Is it tuned to open E, then?", to which Harrison jokes, "No, it's probably F-sharp, because it was strung so slack before.")

==== "Plug Me In" ====
"Plug Me In" is a hard rock track with Harrison, Clapton and Dave Mason each taking guitar solos. It was taped on 18 June, a session that marked the recording debut of Clapton, Whitlock, Radle and Gordon's short-lived band Derek and the Dominos, which had come together to help Harrison record his album. Harrison also contributed on guitar to both sides of the band's debut single, "Tell the Truth" and "Roll It Over", which were produced by Phil Spector during the same session. Whitlock recalls "Plug Me In" as an early example of him playing piano, the style of which he credits to Jerry Lee Lewis and Little Richard, as well as a rare contribution from Mason during the All Things Must Pass sessions.

Although acknowledging that the location for the 18 June 1970 recording has been given as Apple Studio, the compilers of the 2021 Archival Notes book for the album list EMI's Studio 3, based on the recollection of EMI recording engineer Phil McDonald.

=== Side B ===
==== "I Remember Jeep" ====
The title for "I Remember Jeep" originated from the name of Clapton's dog, a Weimaraner named Jeep who had recently gone missing. The line-up on the eight-minute track was Clapton and Harrison on electric guitars, Billy Preston on piano, Voormann on bass and Ginger Baker, Clapton's former bandmate in Cream and Blind Faith, on drums. Harrison also added effects on Moog synthesizer (taken directly from "No Time or Space" from his electronic album Electronic Sound). Inglis comments on the jam's similarity to Cream's songs, describing it as a "musically sophisticated fusion of jazz/blues tempos within a contemporary rock format". The main session took place at Olympic Sound Studios on 29 March 1969, shortly before Harrison started production on Preston's first Apple Records album, That's the Way God Planned It. On 12 May that year – at which point the track was titled "Jam Peace" – Harrison, Lennon and Ono overdubbed handclaps at EMI Studios, and Harrison added the Moog part live as the final mix was being done. (Note: The artist credit listed on the May 1969 EMI tape box and acetate was Plastic Ono Band. Until Harrison changed this credit along with the title of the jam in 1970, the track preceded the first official use of Lennon and Ono's Plastic Ono Band moniker – for their "Give Peace a Chance" single – by several weeks.)

==== "Thanks for the Pepperoni" ====
The title for "Thanks for the Pepperoni" came from a line on a Lenny Bruce comedy album. (Note: In his 2000 Billboard interview, Harrison dismissed the idea that the title was inspired by eating pizza during the session. He credited it to Bruce's piece "Religions, Inc.", in which "he goes on about the pope and things, and then he goes, 'And thanks for the pepperoni.'") The track is a six-minute jam in the style of Chuck Berry's "Roll Over Beethoven". Recorded at the same session as "Plug Me In", it again includes guitar solos by Harrison, Clapton and Mason. Leng comments on Harrison's soloing being "uncannily" similar to Clapton's style, saying that Harrison leads for most of the track, which includes his "hottest licks" since the Beatles' "The End". According to Leng, the sequence of guitar solos is: Harrison up to the 1:30 mark; Mason, 1:40–3:00; Harrison, 3:00–3:17; Clapton, 3:18–4:46; Harrison, 4:47–5:52.

== Packaging ==
In his artwork for All Things Must Pass, Tom Wilkes gave Apple Jam a separate design treatment from the first two LPs. The disc's sleeve and face labels contained a jam jar painted by Wilkes, showing a piece of fruit inside the jar and two apple leaves on the outside. To complete the literal pun on the words "apple jam", he painted the title on the jar's lid. The names of the contributing musicians appeared on the back of the sleeve, separate from the musician credits for the main album, which were printed on the inside of the box housing the three LPs. In many countries, the Apple Jam sleeve was the only place where Clapton was listed as a musical contributor to All Things Must Pass, since rivalries between competing record companies prevented Harrison from acknowledging him in the main album credits.

As with all the tracks on the third disc, "It's Johnny's Birthday" carried a Harrison songwriting credit on the original UK release of All Things Must Pass. On the first US copies, the only songwriting information on the disc's face labels was the standard inclusion of a performing rights organisation, BMI. In December 1970, "Congratulations" songwriters Bill Martin and Phil Coulter claimed for royalties, with the result that the composer's credit for Harrison's track was changed to acknowledge Martin and Coulter.

== Release ==
Apple Records released All Things Must Pass on 27 November 1970. Although not the first rock triple LP, it was the first triple set issued by a single act. The music press were shocked when the release was first announced. In music historian Dave Thompson's description, the record soon confirmed these journalists' speculation – namely that Harrison had long been stockpiling his songs, unable to include more than two compositions on each Beatles album, and that "he'd spent a lot longer jamming with his heavyweight friends than anyone could have guessed." (Note: Harrison later recalled that Lennon was especially negative, telling a mutual friend that Harrison "must be fucking mad, putting three records out".) The album was a major critical and commercial success, despite its retail price – which was over £5 in the United Kingdom and $13.98 in the United States – being considerable for the time. Some of the Capitol Records pressings in North America carried a sticker on the front of the box stating, "2 George Harrison LPs Plus 1 Apple Jam Session" and "3 LPs for the Price of 2". In the UK, excerpts from "I Remember Jeep" and "Plug Me In" were included in the 10 December Top of the Pops album feature on All Things Must Pass.

If people who bought the whole set didn't like the jams, well they still had the [two] proper albums and they hadn't paid any more for the extra disc; and if they did like the jams, then it was a free bonus for them.

— Harrison to Record Mirror, April 1972

Leng comments that Harrison displayed a remarkable lack of ego in affording Clapton a large share of the spotlight on the jam disc. Author Robert Rodriguez similarly writes of Harrison's graciousness in this regard, citing "I Remember Jeep" as a Clapton "guitar showcase". In a 1972 interview, Harrison said he was pleased that all the musicians benefited financially from the jam disc, since he had arranged for the publishing royalties to be shared among the contributors. Writing in his 2010 autobiography, Whitlock says he still received quarterly payments for Apple Jam, citing this as an example of Harrison's generosity since "He just gave it to us without saying a word."

When preparing the 30th anniversary edition of All Things Must Pass in 2000, Harrison changed the order of the Apple Jam tracks so that "It's Johnny's Birthday" became the opener and "Out of the Blue" closed the album. He said that this was the correct sequence, but it had not been possible in 1970 because of running time considerations for vinyl.

The Seattle-based Beatles tribute band Apple Jam took their name after performing a Harrison-themed concert in 2007. In 2009, the band members included Alan White, formerly of Yes and one of the drummers who played on the main All Things Must Pass sessions.

== Critical reception ==
Previewing the triple LP for the Detroit Free Press in 1970, Mike Gormley said that Apple Jam contained "some exceptional hard rock and roll" and "Plug Me In" was "one of the best rock tunes ever heard". He concluded: "The album should sell for around $10. It's worth $50." Less impressed with Harrison's religious stance in the main body of songs, Peter Reilly of Stereo Review wrote that "he seems freer and more involved" in the collaborative set-up reflected in the jam tracks.

Many critics viewed the third disc as inessential and some complained that it drove up the price for the album. Don Heckman of The New York Times deemed All Things Must Pass a "blockbuster" and a major artistic statement by the former Beatle, but said of Apple Jam: "Harrison playing guitar with such dynamite contemporaries as Eric Clapton and Dave Mason – nice, but not really a very exciting addition to the album."

Among more recent assessments, Damian Fanelli of Guitar Player writes that "Winners abound at every turn" on All Things Must Pass yet the album's "guitar high point" is the jam disc. GQ's George Chesterton says that rock "never got more imperial" than on All Things Must Pass but he dismisses Apple Jam as "frankly forgettable", adding that its inclusion "rather illustrates the excesses of the record industry in 1970 and the baronial power of an ex-Beatle to do whatever the hell he wanted to". Jayson Greene of Pitchfork writes that Harrison's 1970 album "in the cultural imagination ... is the first triple album, the first one released as a pointed statement", adding that "'Plug Me In' and 'I Remember Jeep' and 'Thanks for the Pepperoni' are the sound of a contented artist happily forgetting you are there". He says that while the jam tracks are an indulgence, they nevertheless contribute to the album's legacy as a convention-defying release and provided the forerunner to the Clash including children's versions of their songs on the band's 1980 triple album Sandinista! Clapton biographer David Bowling picks "Thanks for the Pepperoni" as the best track and says that while Clapton's presence typically inspired such jams, it was the "informal and relaxed settings" when making All Things Must Pass that "seem to have brought out the best in him".

Roger Catlin of MusicHound and Tom Moon, in his entry for All Things Must Pass in 1,000 Recordings to Hear Before You Die, both view the jam disc as a complement to the high-quality, spiritual-themed songs on the first two LPs. In the 2004 The Rolling Stone Album Guide, Mac Randall states that the album is an exceptional work, but its admirers tend to overlook how the last 30 minutes comprise "a bunch of instrumental blues jams that nobody listens to more than once". Reviewing for AllMusic, Richie Unterberger describes the inclusion of Apple Jam as "a very significant flaw" but recognises that its content "proved to be of immense musical importance", with the formation of Derek and the Dominos. (Note: Unterberger has also written that session tapes reveal an abundance of high-quality Harrison songs not formally recorded for All Things Must Pass. He rues that Harrison chose to fill the third LP with "disposable jams" rather than these songs.) AllMusic critic Bruce Eder similarly sees the third disc as "historically important as the sessions that spawned Eric Clapton's band Derek and the Dominos".
