= I Dig Love =

- Cover of the original Hansen Publishing sheet music for the song

Song by George Harrison

from the album All Things Must Pass
- Released: 27 November 1970
- Recorded: 1970 (London)
- Genre: Rock, blues
- Length: 4:55
- Label: Apple
- Songwriter: George Harrison
- Producers: George Harrison, Phil Spector

"I Dig Love" is a song by English rock musician George Harrison from his 1970 triple album All Things Must Pass. A paean to free love, it marks a departure from the more profound, spiritually oriented subject matter of much of that album. Musically, the song reflects Harrison's early experimentation with slide guitar, a technique that he was introduced to while touring with Delaney & Bonnie and Friends in December 1969.

Typically of much of the material on All Things Must Pass, the recording features an extended line-up of musicians, including three guitarists, two drummers and three keyboard players. Among the musicians were former Delaney & Bonnie band members Eric Clapton, Bobby Whitlock and Dave Mason, along with Billy Preston and Ringo Starr. The track was co-produced by Phil Spector and recorded in London.

On release, it was among the album's most popular songs on US radio. Given the high standard of Harrison's songwriting on All Things Must Pass, however, several of his biographers have since held "I Dig Love" in low regard and consider it to be one of the album's weakest tracks. Indian singer Asha Puthli and American band the Black Crowes have both covered the song. Part of Puthli's version was sampled by British rapper Kano for his 2005 track "Reload It".

== Background ==
Like "Woman Don't You Cry for Me" and "My Sweet Lord", "I Dig Love" originated from George Harrison's initial experimentation with slide-guitar playing, in open E tuning. His introduction to this technique occurred in December 1969, when he joined Eric Clapton as a guest on Delaney & Bonnie's European tour. In his autobiography, I Me Mine, Harrison recalls that Delaney Bramlett "handed me a bottleneck slide and asked me to play a line which Dave Mason had played on the ['Coming Home'] record", since Mason had recently quit the tour.

With Harrison travelling without his wife, Pattie Boyd, the Delaney & Bonnie tour revealed an aspect of his persona that was at odds with his public image as the Beatle most preoccupied with Eastern religion and spirituality. Despite Harrison's strong ties to the Hare Krishna movement, whose core principles espoused a life of abstinence, Bramlett later recalled him "let[ting] his hair down" on the tour, in a manner reminiscent of the Beatles' pre-fame years in Hamburg. (Note: Clapton has written of Harrison attempting to initiate a situation whereby, following the band's show in Liverpool on 6 December, Clapton was to spend the night with Boyd while Harrison partnered off with her younger sister, Paula.)

With regard to the inclusion of "I Dig Love" on Harrison's first post-Beatles solo album, All Things Must Pass, author Simon Leng describes it as an "unusually libidinous detour", similar to the "brief sensory interlude" offered by the track "Let It Down". Leng notes that the composition is one of the few that Harrison fails to either discuss in his autobiography or include in the two-volume Songs by George Harrison; this repeated omission, Leng concludes, "perhaps suggests what its writer ultimately thought of [the song]".

== Composition ==
Musically, "I Dig Love" is built around a riff, played primarily on piano, that first descends before retracing the same notes back to its starting point. In a contemporary review of All Things Must Pass, music journalist Alan Smith likened the sequence to "The Pink Panther Theme" by Henry Mancini.

Leng writes that, with the repeated declaration of "I dig love every morning / I dig love every evening", Harrison's lyrics reflect the "loosening of social taboos about sex and sexuality", an issue that was at the forefront of the 1960s countercultural revolution. While also viewing the lyrics as a marked departure from the predominantly spiritual themes found on All Things Must Pass, theologian Dale Allison describes "I Dig Love" as an endorsement of that era's free love movement. Leng cites lines from the song's first verse as being a mix of "Pseudo-Dylanesque wordplay" and "George's schoolboy jokes":

Small love, big love, I don't care
Love's all good love to me
Left love, right love, anywhere love
There's a rare love – come on and get it, it's free.

Leng draws parallels between "I Dig Love" and the Beatles' more free-form compositions of the late 1960s. Among these, Paul McCartney's "Why Don't We Do It in the Road?" exemplifies what Ian MacDonald termed in the 1990s the "long-gone let-it-all-hang-out era". In his book Working Class Mystic, Gary Tillery identifies "I Dig Love" as one of two All Things Must Pass tracks (the other being "Wah-Wah") that could have been sung by John Lennon, whose style increasingly embraced provocative artistic statements following the start of his relationship with Yoko Ono in 1968. Leng also compares "I Dig Love" with "Love the One You're With", a "hymn to hedonism" by Stephen Stills, with whom Harrison worked on Doris Troy's eponymous album for Apple Records, in 1969–70.

== Recording ==
The basic track for "I Dig Love" was recorded in London, either at Abbey Road Studios or Trident, between June and August 1970. As on many of the sessions for All Things Must Pass, the contributing musicians included members of Delaney & Bonnie's 1969 tour band, including Bobby Whitlock and Jim Gordon, both of whom formed Derek and the Dominos with Clapton at this time.

According to Leng and author Bruce Spizer, Whitlock provided the piano part on the recording, while the Wurlitzer electric piano and Hammond organ were played by Gary Wright and Billy Preston, respectively. In his autobiography, however, Whitlock states that, being a non-pianist at this stage of his career, he played organ on the track, while Preston supplied the piano part. Accompanying Harrison on electric guitars (at least two of which were played using a slide) were Clapton and Mason, while Ringo Starr contributed the drum fills that complement the main riff, alongside Gordon on a second drum kit. (Note: In another example of the confusion surrounding the identity of specific contributors on All Things Must Pass, Alan White has said that he was one of the drummers on "I Dig Love".) While Leng and Spizer credit Klaus Voormann for the bass guitar part, Whitlock lists Carl Radle, his former Delaney & Bonnie bandmate and the fourth member of Derek and the Dominos. In Whitlock's recollection, Mason joined the proceedings right at the end of the sessions for the album's basic tracks, making "I Dig Love" one of the final songs recorded.

Described by Leng as "sassy", Harrison's slide guitar solo was added during the album's principal overdubbing phase, which ended on 12 August. Frequently absent from the All Things Must Pass sessions, his co-producer, Phil Spector, had recommended in a letter dated 19 August that a synthesizer be added onto the song's intro – a suggestion that Harrison apparently ignored, according to authors Chip Madinger and Mark Easter.

== Release and reception ==
"I Dig Love" was released in November 1970 as the opening track on side four of All Things Must Pass, in its original LP format. Reviewing the album for the NME, Alan Smith described the song as a "simple and effective opener" that would "stand the passage of time". Author Robert Rodriguez includes the track among examples of how the musical diversity on All Things Must Pass surprised listeners, following Lennon and McCartney's dominance as songwriters in the Beatles. Rodriguez writes: "That the 'Quiet Beatle' was capable of such range – from the joyful 'What Is Life' to the meditative 'Isn't It a Pity' to the steamrolling 'Art of Dying' to the playful 'I Dig Love' – was truly revelatory."

In addition to receiving critical acclaim for the quality of its songs, the album was noted for introducing Harrison as a slide guitarist, a role that contributed to his signature sound as a solo artist. After "My Sweet Lord", "Isn't It a Pity" and "What Is Life" – all of which were featured single tracks and enjoyed heavy airplay on US radio – "I Dig Love" was among the album's most-played songs in America, along with "Wah-Wah", "All Things Must Pass" and "Awaiting on You All".

Among Harrison and Beatles biographers, opinions on "I Dig Love" have been less favourable in the ensuing decades. Alan Clayson suggests that, given the abundance of quality music on Harrison's triple album, the track "could have been ditched without any hardship", together with the second of the two versions of "Isn't It a Pity". Bruce Spizer finds the song "catchy and at times interesting" musically, with "some excellent guitar playing", but considers the words "trite" by Harrison's standards.

Simon Leng bemoans the song's "hackneyed, falling-and-rising chromatic chord pattern" and lyrics that are "probably the weakest of Harrison's career", and suggests that the 1970 outtake "I Live for You" would have been a preferable inclusion. Leng adds that Harrison's guitar solo and "particularly strong" vocal performance on "I Dig Love" "almost save the day", yet the song "lacks the expressive clout" of the rest of its parent album. Ian Inglis similarly dismisses "I Dig Love", describing it as repetitive and lyrically simplistic. While also comparing the composition with Stills' "Love the One You're With", he opines: "But whereas that song is a celebratory endorsement of 'free love,' Harrison's is a gloomy and unconvincing contribution."

Elliot Huntley views the track as "a rather scantily clad four-chord throwaway" and "the closest thing to filler on the entire album". Recognising the need for "a little light relief", Huntley concludes: "'I Dig Love' can best be described as audacious songwriting, believing that everything will work out in the studio. And the song succeeds almost despite itself."

== Cover versions ==
Indian singer Asha Puthli recorded "I Dig Love", creating a version that Jon Pareles of The New York Times describes as "a wild, post-psychedelic artifact, complete with sound effects, soul horns and Ms. Puthli alternately breathy and giggling". The recording appeared on her self-titled debut album, released in 1973. Speaking to Pareles in 2006, Puthli explained that she had viewed Harrison's reading of "I Dig Love" as a "spiritual song", adding: "They did it like a bhajan, an Indian religious song. In 1973, when I did it, I felt I was already Indian, and the spirituality was inside me. I was trying to become Western, so I brought out the material aspect, the sexual aspect." In 2005, Puthli's recording was sampled by British rapper Kano on his track "Reload It".

The Black Crowes have regularly performed the song live, notably during their 2001 Brotherly Love tour with Oasis. In 2008, Suburban Skies recorded "I Dig Love" for their Harrison tribute album George.

== Personnel ==
The musicians who performed on "I Dig Love" are believed to be as follows:

- George Harrison – vocals, slide guitars
- Eric Clapton – electric guitar
- Dave Mason – electric guitar
- Bobby Whitlock – piano
- Gary Wright – electric piano
- Billy Preston – organ
- Klaus Voormann – bass
- Ringo Starr – drums
- Jim Gordon – drums
- uncredited – tambourine

== Sources ==
- Dale C. Allison Jr., The Love There That's Sleeping: The Art and Spirituality of George Harrison, Continuum (New York, NY, 2006; ISBN 978-0-8264-1917-0).
- Keith Badman, The Beatles Diary Volume 2: After the Break-Up 1970–2001, Omnibus Press (London, 2001; ISBN 0-7119-8307-0).
- Harry Castleman & Walter J. Podrazik, All Together Now: The First Complete Beatles Discography 1961–1975, Ballantine Books (New York, NY, 1976; ISBN 0-345-25680-8).
- Eric Clapton, Eric Clapton: The Autobiography, Random House (New York, NY, 2008; ISBN 978-0-09-950549-5).
- Alan Clayson, George Harrison, Sanctuary (London, 2003; ISBN 1-86074-489-3).
- Peter Doggett, You Never Give Me Your Money: The Beatles After the Breakup, It Books (New York, NY, 2011; ISBN 978-0-06-177418-8).
- George Harrison, I Me Mine, Chronicle Books (San Francisco, CA, 2002; ISBN 0-8118-3793-9).
- Chris Hunt (ed.), NME Originals: Beatles – The Solo Years 1970–1980, IPC Ignite! (London, 2005).
- Elliot J. Huntley, Mystical One: George Harrison – After the Break-up of the Beatles, Guernica Editions (Toronto, ON, 2006; ISBN 1-55071-197-0).
- Ian Inglis, The Words and Music of George Harrison, Praeger (Santa Barbara, CA, 2010; ISBN 978-0-313-37532-3).
- Peter Lavezzoli, The Dawn of Indian Music in the West, Continuum (New York, NY, 2006; ISBN 0-8264-2819-3).
- Simon Leng, While My Guitar Gently Weeps: The Music of George Harrison, Hal Leonard (Milwaukee, WI, 2006; ISBN 1-4234-0609-5).
- Ian MacDonald, Revolution in the Head: The Beatles' Records and the Sixties, Pimlico (London, 1998; ISBN 0-7126-6697-4).
- Chip Madinger & Mark Easter, Eight Arms to Hold You: The Solo Beatles Compendium, 44.1 Productions (Chesterfield, MO, 2000; ISBN 0-615-11724-4).
- Barry Miles, The Beatles Diary Volume 1: The Beatles Years, Omnibus Press (London, 2001; ISBN 0-7119-8308-9).
- Robert Rodriguez, Fab Four FAQ 2.0: The Beatles' Solo Years, 1970–1980, Backbeat Books (Milwaukee, WI, 2010; ISBN 978-1-4165-9093-4).
- Harry Shapiro, Eric Clapton: Lost in the Blues, Da Capo Press (New York, NY, 1992; ISBN 0-306-80480-8).
- Bruce Spizer, The Beatles Solo on Apple Records, 498 Productions (New Orleans, LA, 2005; ISBN 0-9662649-5-9).
- Gary Tillery, Working Class Mystic: A Spiritual Biography of George Harrison, Quest Books (Wheaton, IL, 2011; ISBN 978-0-8356-0900-5).
- Bobby Whitlock with Marc Roberty, Bobby Whitlock: A Rock 'n' Roll Autobiography, McFarland (Jefferson, NC, 2010; ISBN 978-0-7864-6190-5).
