= Bobby Whitlock (album) =

Studio album by Bobby Whitlock
- Released: March 1972
- Recorded: January–March 1971
- Studios: Olympic, London
- Genre: Rock
- Length: 33:34
- Labels: ABC-Dunhill (US); CBS (UK)
- Producers: Andy Johns; Bobby Whitlock

Bobby Whitlock chronology
Bobby Whitlock (1972)	Raw Velvet (1972)

Bobby Whitlock is the debut solo album by American songwriter and rock musician Bobby Whitlock, released in early 1972. The album features all of the former members of Derek and the Dominos – Whitlock, Eric Clapton, Carl Radle and Jim Gordon – although never all together. Other contributors include George Harrison, the sessions for whose 1970 triple album All Things Must Pass had led to the formation of the Dominos; Delaney and Bonnie Bramlett; and ex-Manfred Mann bassist Klaus Voormann.

== Recording ==
The album was produced by Whitlock and Andy Johns, apart from the song "I'd Rather Live the Straight Life", which Whitlock produced with Joe Zagarino. The sessions took place at Olympic Sound Studios in London, beginning in March 1971, according to a press release accompanying the album's 2013 reissue. The album's creation coincided with the final months of Derek and the Dominos' brief career, which ended during the Johns-produced sessions for their proposed second studio album in April–May that year. Dominos biographer Jan Reid describes the relationships among the band members as "dicey" and writes that while making Bobby Whitlock, in what Reid gives as January 1971, Whitlock worked with Gordon on a basic track before Clapton or Radle would add their parts separately.

On the original release, musician credits did not appear, although the record company's press release listed some of the album's main contributors. When discussing the sessions in his 2010 autobiography, Whitlock lists Delaney Bramlett, rather than Voormann, as the bass player on some tracks. Harrison played guitar on some songs, out of gratitude for Whitlock's participation on All Things Must Pass.

The opening song, "Where There's a Will", was a collaboration with Bonnie Bramlett that also featured the former Delaney & Bonnie horn section, Bobby Keys and Jim Price. Whitlock recalls writing "A Game Called Life" and "The Scenery Has Slowly Changed" at Clapton's house Hurtwood Edge, shortly after he and Clapton had quit working with Delaney & Bonnie. "Song for Paula" was written for the sister of Harrison's wife, Pattie Boyd; the gatefold album cover also featured a photo of Paula Boyd. According to Whitlock, "Back in My Life Again" came about towards the end of a session when Harrison suggested he "just make something up"; Whitlock then discussed a tempo with drummer Jim Gordon, told the other musicians the key was B minor, and said to Andy Johns, "Hit record." Whitlock praises Gordon's drumming on the album as "astounding" and says of Clapton's performance on "The Scenery Has Slowly Changed": "This is the most beautiful guitar work that I have ever heard Eric play. What he played was for me, I'm sure, because he was playing how I felt."

== Release and reception ==
Professional ratings
Review scores
Source	Rating
AllMusic	4.5/5 stars
Christgau's Record Guide	C−

The album's release was delayed after Whitlock's original record company objected to its musical content. He subsequently moved on to ABC-Dunhill Records, who issued it in early 1972. Jan Reid suggests that Whitlock's vocal performances on the album showed that he missed singing with Clapton, who was incapacitated throughout the early 1970s due to his heroin addiction. Talking to music journalist Phil Sutcliffe in 2011, Whitlock recalled a visit he made to Clapton's house in 1972 to celebrate the album's release: "I brought two bottles of Dom Perignon. I rang the bell and shouted and no one came. I walked all over the grounds. Finally he came to the door. He had a robe on and his hair hadn't been washed in months. I said, 'What are you doing to yourself?' He looked at me vacantly and said, 'Nice car, man'. I left his champagne on the doorstep."

On release, Billboard magazine described Bobby Whitlock as "a persuasively powerful first album". The review continued: "Gathering around him such illustrious personages as Mr. & Mrs. Bramlett, Masters Clapton & Harrison and the L.A. Symphony Orchestra, [Whitlock] proves himself a dynamic, volatile performer whose horizons are limitless." Village Voice critic Robert Christgau was less enthusiastic in his review and said that the album suffers from Whitlock's singing, which he called laborious and "mindless".

In an April 2011 article on Derek and the Dominos, for The A.V. Club, Noel Murray described Whitlock as "a superior singer-songwriter" and labeled his debut album "an under-heralded classic". Steve Kurutz of AllMusic views it as "a solid effort filled with southern gospel influences … and rootsy rockers", adding: "On the mournful ballad 'Dreams of a Hobo', Whitlock shows that all his good material was not spent on the Derek & the Dominoes project."

In September 2013, the album was reissued along with Whitlock's follow-up, Raw Velvet (1972), on the two-disc set Where There's a Will, There's a Way: The ABC-Dunhill Recordings.

== Track listing ==
All songs by Bobby Whitlock, except where noted.

Side one

1. "Where There's a Will" (Whitlock, Bonnie Bramlett) – 3:42
2. "Song for Paula" – 4:17
3. "A Game Called Life" – 4:10
4. "Country Life" – 3:05
5. "A Day Without Jesus" (Whitlock, Don Nix) – 3:20

Side two

1. "Back in My Life Again" – 3:25
2. "The Scenery Has Slowly Changed" – 3:46
3. "I'd Rather Live the Straight Life" – 2:28
4. "The Dreams of a Hobo" – 3:01
5. "Back Home in England" – 2:47

== Personnel ==
- Bobby Whitlock – vocals (all tracks), keyboards (1), acoustic guitar (2, 4, 8, 9), piano (2, 4, 5), organ (2, 5, 6), 12-string guitar (3, 7), electric guitar (10)
- George Harrison – guitar (1, 5, 6)
- Eric Clapton – guitar (1, 5–7)
- Klaus Voormann – bass (1–3, 5–7)
- Jim Gordon – drums (1–3, 5–7, 10), tabla (3, 7)
- Bobby Keys – saxophone (1, 6)
- Jim Price – trumpet (1), trombone (6)
- Delaney Bramlett – guitar (2), vocals (4, 5, 8)
- Chris Wood – flute (3)
- Jim Keltner – drums (4, 9)
- Carl Radle – bass (4, 8, 9)
- Jerry McGee – electric guitar (4, 8, 9)
- Bonnie Bramlett – vocals (4, 5, 8)
- Los Angeles Symphony Orchestra – strings (10), brass (10)

== Sources ==
- Eric Clapton, Eric Clapton: The Autobiography, Random House (New York, NY, 2008; ISBN 978-0-09-950549-5).
- Simon Leng, While My Guitar Gently Weeps: The Music of George Harrison, Hal Leonard (Milwaukee, WI, 2006; ISBN 1-4234-0609-5).
- The New Rolling Stone Encyclopedia of Rock & Roll, Fireside/Rolling Stone Press (New York, NY, 1995; ISBN 0-684-81044-1).
- Jan Reid, Layla and Other Assorted Love Songs by Derek and the Dominos, Rodale (New York, NY, 2006; ISBN 978-1-59486-369-1).
- Bobby Whitlock with Marc Roberty, Bobby Whitlock: A Rock 'n' Roll Autobiography, McFarland (Jefferson, NC, 2010; ISBN 978-0-7864-6190-5).
