= Restless Ones =

Studio album by Heartless Bastards
- Released: June 16, 2015
- Genre: Blues rock, country rock, folk rock
- Label: Partisan

Heartless Bastards chronology
Arrow (2012)	Restless Ones (2015)

Restless Ones is the fifth album by American folk band, Heartless Bastards. The album was released on June 16, 2015 through Partisan Records and is their second release on the label.

== Track listing ==
No.	Title	Length
1.	"Wind Up Bird"	4:22
2.	"Gates of Dawn"	3:20
3.	"Black Cloud"	3:24
4.	"Hi-Line"	4:48
5.	"Journey"	3:43
6.	"Pocket Full of Thirst"	4:22
7.	"Into the Light"	3:38
8.	"The Fool"	4:08
9.	"Eastern Wind"	3:51
10.	"Tristessa"	5:10
