= Arrow (Heartless Bastards album) =

Studio album by Heartless Bastards
- Released: February 15, 2012
- Genres: Blues rock, country rock, folk rock
- Label: Partisan/Kniting Factory

Heartless Bastards chronology
The Mountain (2009)	Arrow (2012)	Restless Ones (2015)

Singles from Arrow
- 1. "Parted Ways" Released: April 12, 2012

Professional ratings
Aggregate scores
Source	Rating
Metacritic	76%
Review scores
Source	Rating
Allmusic	3.5/5 stars
The A.V. Club	A−
The Boston Globe	3/5 stars
Consequence of Sound	C+
Paste	8.0/10
Pitchfork	6.4/10
PopMatters	7/10 stars
The Rolling Stone	3.5./5 stars

Arrow is the fourth album by American folk band, Heartless Bastards. The album was released on February 15, 2012 through Partisan Records.

== Track listing ==
No.	Title	Length
1.	"Marathon"	6:10
2.	"Parted Ways"	4:58
3.	"Got To Have Rock ‘N Roll"	3:55
4.	"Only For You"	5:08
5.	"Simple Feeling"	4:34
6.	"Skin and Bone"	4:00
7.	"The Arrow Killed The Beast"	6:31
8.	"Late In The Night"	3:59
9.	"Low Low Low"	5:03
10.	"Down In The Canyon"	7:36

=== Deluxe edition ===
The iTunes edition of the album contained a bonus track.

Deluxe edition – iTunes
No.	Title	Length
11.	"Bye Bye Baby Blues"	3:26

== Personnel ==
- Erika Wennerstrom – guitar, vocals
- Marc Nathan – guitar
- Willie "Maceo 2" Rhodes – guitar
- Billy White – bass
- Doni Schroader – drums
- Zy Orange Lyn – violin, mandolin

== Chart performance ==
Chart (2015)	Peak position
U.S. Billboard 200	78
U.S. Billboard Independent Albums	2
U.S. Billboard Top Rock Albums	20
U.S. Billboard Tastemaker Albums	8
U.S. Billboard Top Album Sales	78
