= All This Time (Heartless Bastards album) =

Studio album by Heartless Bastards
- Released: August 8, 2006
- Genre: Blues-rock
- Length: 39:49
- Label: Fat Possum Records
- Producer: Brian Niesz

Heartless Bastards chronology
Stairs And Elevators (2005)	All This Time (2006)	The Mountain (2009)

Professional ratings
Review scores
Source	Rating
Allmusic	4/5 stars
Pitchfork Media	(6.7/10)
Blender	4/5 stars

All This Time is the second album by American blues rock band Heartless Bastards. It is their second Release on Fat Possum Records. It was their last full release to include the original drummer Kevin Vaughn and bassist Mike Lamping, who would both leave before recording The Mountain. It was produced by Brian Niesz and released on August 8, 2006.

== Track listing ==
All tracks written by Erika Wennerstrom.

1. "Into the Open" – 4:24
2. "Searching for the Ghost" – 3:46
3. "Finding Solutions" – 3:34
4. "All This Time" – 3:06
5. "Brazen" – 3:17
6. "I Swallowed a Dragonfly" – 4:05
7. "Blue Day" – 4:49
8. "Valley of Debris" – 4:18
9. "No Pointing Arrows" – 2:39
10. "Came a Long Way" – 5:53

== Personnel ==
- Erika Wennerstrom – vocals, guitar, piano
- Mike Lamping – bass
- Kevin Vaughn – drums
