= I Live for You =

Song by George Harrison

from the album All Things Must Pass (30th Anniversary Edition)
- Published: 1970
- Released: 22 January 2001
- Recorded: June 1970; 2000
- Studio: Abbey Road, London; FPSHOT, Oxfordshire
- Genre: Country rock
- Length: 3:36
- Label: Gnome
- Songwriter(s): George Harrison
- Producer(s): George Harrison, Phil Spector

"I Live for You" is a song by English rock musician George Harrison originally recorded during the sessions for his All Things Must Pass triple album in 1970. Long available on bootlegs, the song was finally released officially as a bonus track on the 30th anniversary reissue of All Things Must Pass in January 2001. The released recording features only Harrison's lead vocal and Pete Drake's prominent pedal-steel guitar from the 1970 album sessions, with all other instruments overdubbed by Harrison and his son Dhani in 2000. Despite the wealth of unreleased material recorded for All Things Must Pass, it was the only new song included with the album's 2001 reissue. Music critics recognise "I Live for You" as one of many George Harrison compositions that can be interpreted as both a traditional love song and a devotional song.

== Composition ==
The lyrics of "I Live for You" serve as a paean to a deity, although they also invite interpretation as a love song addressing a human lover. In musicologist Thomas MacFarlane's description, the lyrics "explore how we are fundamentally isolated from the world around us", yet "even though the singer admits he is detached and alone, he acknowledges the sense of connection achieved through relationship with a loved one."

In stating his devotion to God, Harrison references the Bhagavad Gita as he dismisses all worldly cares as a distraction from life's true purpose and declares "not a thing do I own" without God's love. According to Christian theologian Dale Allison, the song is a confession that "manages to convey hope and melancholy at the same time". Harrison pledges to wait "through many years" and his certainty that he can connect with God's love lifts him from despair. (Note: In addition to citing the Bhagavad Gita's influence, Allison recognises Harrison's dismissal of material concerns in "I Live for You" as "his version of the refrain ... 'All is vanity'", from the Christian Old Testament book of Ecclesiastes.)

Harrison musical biographer Simon Leng views the song as a "balmy ballad" with a "self-contained main melodic couplet [that] is one of his most effective". MacFarlane describes it as a "gentle, rustic ballad". He also writes:

The appropriately basic chord progression supports a winding melodic vocal line that leads unexpectedly into the upper register for its resolution. The contrasting [bridge] section mimics the contour of the main melody, but quickly resolves downward to create a satisfying sense of balance.

== Recording ==
=== 1970 session ===
Harrison taped the basic track for "I Live for You" at Abbey Road Studios in London during the first batch of sessions for All Things Must Pass, between late May and the second week of June 1970. On Bob Dylan's recommendation, Harrison invited Nashville musician Pete Drake to the sessions. Harrison flew Drake over to London, where he contributed pedal steel guitar to country-style tracks such as "I Live for You", "Behind That Locked Door" and "All Things Must Pass". Drake had similarly provided pedal steel for Dylan's excursions into the country-music genre on the albums John Wesley Harding (1967) and Nashville Skyline (1969). On "I Live for You", according to MacFarlane, Drake's playing "explores microtonal gestures ... that recall the flexibility of the sitar".

Peter Frampton was among the other musicians on the tracks recorded with Drake. Frampton played acoustic guitar, with Harrison, although his name did not appear on the album credits.

Harrison had a considerable number of songs at his disposal for All Things Must Pass, many of them left over from his final years with the Beatles. He chose not to finish "I Live for You" after taping the basic track. He later admitted to feeling dissatisfied with the version recorded in 1970, apart from Drake's contribution and that of "the rhythm guitarist". Speaking in February 2001, Harrison further discussed the song's exclusion, saying he had also viewed the song as being "a bit fruity".

The song was copyrighted in 1970 to Harrison's publishing company Harrisongs. As with the All Things Must Pass outtakes "Dehra Dhun", "Om Hare Om (Gopala Krishna)" and "Going Down to Golders Green", "I Live for You" began circulating on bootleg compilations in 1999. (Note: These recordings became available via Abbey Road engineer Mike Jarrett, who prepared a Sonic Solutions "No Noise" alternative to the All Things Must Pass 1987 CD.) A lyric from the song's bridge provided the title for one such bootleg, Through Many Years.

=== 2000 overdubs ===
Harrison returned to the song in 2000 while overseeing the 30th anniversary reissue of his 1970 triple album. Retaining only his lead vocal and Drake's pedal steel, he recorded new acoustic rhythm guitar parts and bass, while his son, Dhani Harrison, added Fender Rhodes electric piano.

Backing vocals were also added at this time. In his liner notes in the new album booklet, Harrison states: "We fiddled around with the drum track and hopefully improved it."

== Release and reception ==
"I Live for You" was one of five bonus tracks on the reissued All Things Must Pass, the release of which was delayed from its true anniversary date of November 2000 until January 2001. In an interview for Billboard magazine in December 2000, Harrison discussed the song's inclusion on the reissue: "[The] main thing about it for me is the Pete Drake solo on pedal steel guitar. He died [in 1988], and I often thought if his family is still around, then suddenly they'll be hearing him playing this thing that they've never heard before. I really loved his pedal steel guitar – the bagpipes of country & western music."

In an otherwise favourable review of the reissue, James Hunter of Rolling Stone described the bonus tracks as "inessential" and bemoaned their sequencing on the two-CD set, midway through the album's original track listing. In the same publication's tribute book to Harrison, following his death from cancer in November 2001, Greg Kot praised "I Live for You" and the other "especially worthy bonus tracks" and highlighted Drake's "fine pedal-steel solo". Music critic Richie Unterberger also welcomes its inclusion on the 2001 reissue. He said the song has a "late-'60s Bob Dylan influence in its laconic, romantic country-rock", adding, "though this is more tuneful than most of what Dylan was coming up with in the style, and dusted with George's inimitably devout-but-dignified tone."

Harrison biographer Elliot Huntley views the song as "the real plum" among the new additions to the 1970 album, with an "appropriately tender and humble" vocal from Harrison. He considers that it would have made a worthy track on a full, country-themed side two of the original triple LP, beside "Behind That Locked Door" and Harrison's cover of Dylan's "If Not for You". Simon Leng describes "I Live for You" as an "unreleased gem" that merited inclusion on the original All Things Must Pass more so than "I Dig Love" and the "sedate" second version of "Isn't It a Pity". "I Live for You" also appears on the 2014 Apple Years 1968–75 reissue of All Things Must Pass.

== Personnel ==
- George Harrison – lead vocals, acoustic guitar, bass guitar, drum machine, backing vocals
- Pete Drake – pedal steel guitar
- Dhani Harrison – fender rhodes, backing vocals

== Sources ==
- Dale C. Allison, Jr, The Love There That's Sleeping: The Art and Spirituality of George Harrison, Continuum (New York, NY, 2006; ISBN 978-0-8264-1917-0).
- Keith Badman, The Beatles Diary Volume 2: After the Break-Up 1970–2001, Omnibus Press (London, 2001; ISBN 0-7119-8307-0).
- Alan Clayson, George Harrison, Sanctuary (London, 2003; ISBN 1-86074-489-3).
- The Editors of Rolling Stone, Harrison, Rolling Stone Press/Simon & Schuster (New York, NY, 2002; ISBN 0-7432-3581-9).
- George Harrison (with Derek Taylor & Olivia Harrison), I, Me, Mine – The Extended Edition, Genesis Publications (Guildford, UK, 2017; ISBN 978-1-905662-40-1).
- Bill Harry, The George Harrison Encyclopedia, Virgin Books (London, 2003; ISBN 978-0-7535-0822-0).
- Elliot J. Huntley, Mystical One: George Harrison – After the Break-up of the Beatles, Guernica Editions (Toronto, ON, 2006; ISBN 1-55071-197-0).
- Simon Leng, While My Guitar Gently Weeps: The Music of George Harrison, Hal Leonard (Milwaukee, WI, 2006; ISBN 1-4234-0609-5).
- Thomas MacFarlane, The Music of George Harrison, Routledge (Abingdon, UK, 2019; ISBN 978-1-138-59910-9).
- Chip Madinger & Mark Easter, Eight Arms to Hold You: The Solo Beatles Compendium, 44.1 Productions (Chesterfield, MO, 2000; ISBN 0-615-11724-4).
- Nicholas Schaffner, The Beatles Forever, McGraw-Hill (New York, NY, 1978; ISBN 0-07-055087-5).
- Bruce Spizer, The Beatles Solo on Apple Records, 498 Productions (New Orleans, LA, 2005; ISBN 0-9662649-5-9).
- Richie Unterberger, The Unreleased Beatles: Music & Film, Backbeat Books (San Francisco, CA, 2006; ISBN 0-87930-892-3).
