= Heartless Bastards =

American rock band

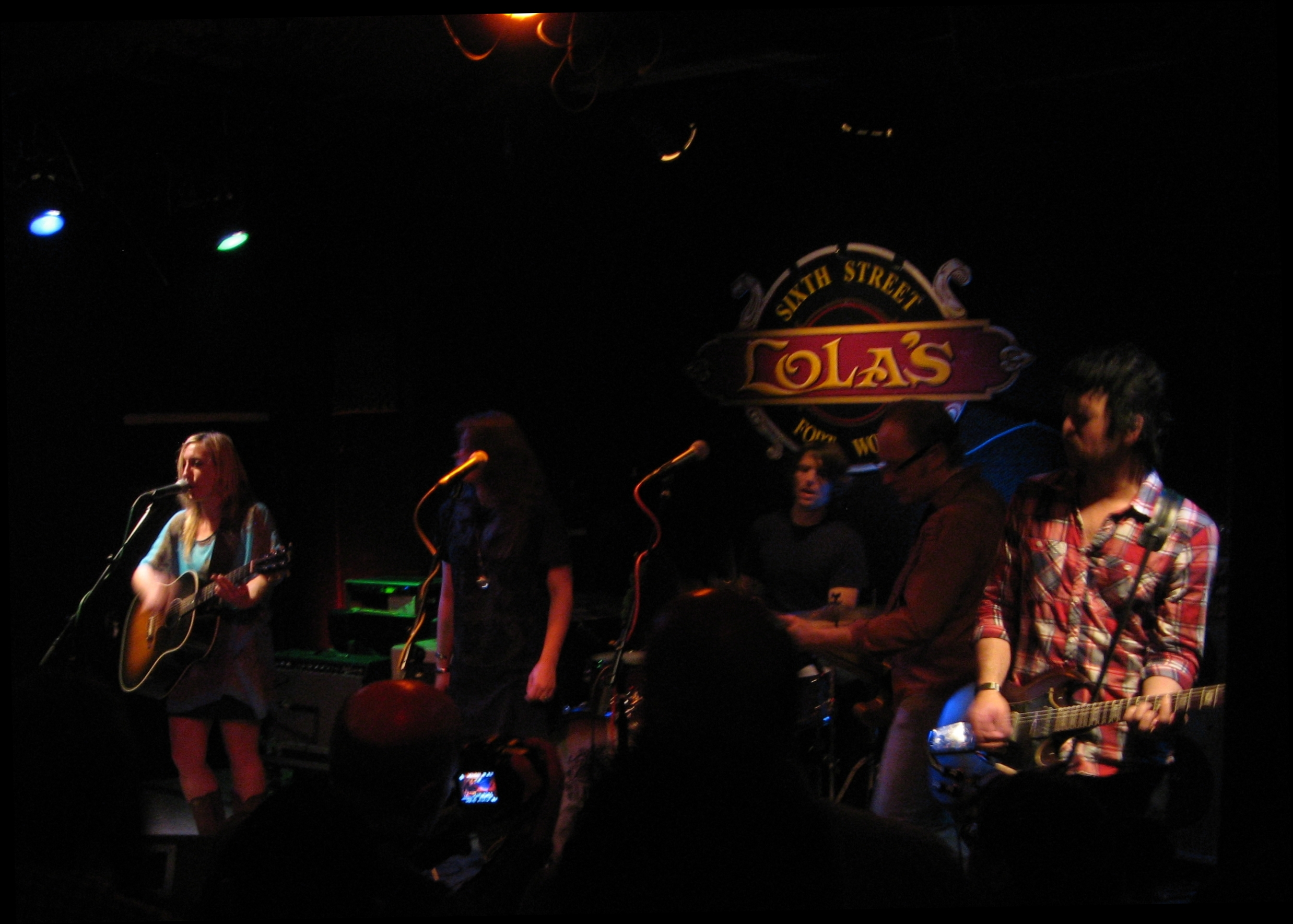
- Heartless Bastards in 2012

Background information
- Origin: Cincinnati, Ohio, U.S.
- Genres: Blues rock, indie rock, garage rock, country rock
- Years active: 2003–present
- Labels: Sweet Unknown Records, Partisan Records; Fat Possum Records, Dine Alone Records (Canada)
- Members: Erika Wennerstrom; Greg Clifford; Sam Pankey; Jonas Wilson; Beth Harris
- Past members: Mike Lamping; Kevin Vaughn; Dave Colvin; Jesse Ebaugh; Mark Nathan
- Website: TheHeartlessBastards.com

Heartless Bastards are an American rock band formed in Cincinnati, Ohio, in 2003. The band has released six albums.

== History ==
Heartless Bastards originally started as a recording project of Erika Wennerstrom. She played most of the instruments and featured David Colvin on drums, along with contributions from Reuben Glaser on lead guitar and Jesse Ebaugh on bass. A five-song demo was recorded in December 2002 at Ultrasuede Studios by Shannon McGee. Wennerstrom put together a live band and played the first live show at the Comet, a bar in the Cincinnati community of Northside, in August 2003. The live lineup came to be a three-piece with Kevin Vaughn on drums and Mike Lamping on bass. The band was signed to Fat Possum Records in 2004 after Patrick Carney from the Black Keys passed along a demo he received from Wennerstrom.

According to Wennerstrom, the name of the band came from a question on a Mega Touch trivia quiz game at a bar. A question asked the name of Tom Petty's backing band, and one of the options was "Tom Petty and the Heartless Bastards". She thought it was funny, and used it when she later formed a band.

Their debut album, Stairs and Elevators, was released in 2004. Rolling Stone said, "the Heartless Bastards are a small-town band who are ready to show the big city no mercy". The Village Voice wrote: "deadeye accurate in pitch and message ... what we've got is a hard, gnarled voice singing simple-seeming melodies that feel archetypal rather than ordinary, which is no easier to explain than it is to do". Stylus Magazine gave the group high praise, stating, "[Wennerstrom] and her two band mates have created an album with more rocking songs and fat hooks than most bands can dream of. It's not just that they rock, it's that you believe what you hear, that they love the sound they make, that Wennerstrom lays her soul bare in her lyrics without sounding like Sarah McLachlan, that the women of rock who labored to make it OK for a girl to dream of playing guitar deserve far better than Avril Lavigne or Kelly Osbourne as their descendants."

The second full-length album from the band, All This Time, was released on August 8, 2006. The band road tested many of the tracks on the record prior to releasing it. The album relies less on guitar riffs and belted vocals and more on musicianship, without leaving behind the group's unique sound. On the modern rock station WOXY, the band was ranked No. 12 on the 97 Best of 2005, putting the band among the likes of Spoon and ahead of the White Stripes.

In August 2008, a new line-up for the band was announced. Erika Wennerstrom remains the only constant member, rejoined by bassist Jesse Ebaugh and original Heartless Bastards drummer Dave Colvin.

Their third album, The Mountain, was released February 3, 2009, on Fat Possum Records and was produced by Spoon producer Mike McCarthy. For this album the band broadened their sound to include elements of country music, employing violin, banjo, mandolin, and steel guitar.

Heartless Bastards performed a taping for the PBS series Austin City Limits on June 3, 2009, as part of the show's 35th anniversary season. In October and November 2009 the band opened for Wolfmother during the band's American tour.

On November 17, 2011, Heartless Bastards announced they had signed with Brooklyn-based Partisan Records to release their fourth album, Arrow, on February 14, 2012. On December 15, 2011, the band announced on Twitter that the pre-order for Arrow was launched, and that fans could get a limited-edition lithograph by preordering. Arrow was produced by Spoon drummer Jim Eno at his Public Hi-Fi home studio in Austin, Texas. It featured a line-up of Erika Wennerstrom (vocals/guitar), Jesse Ebaugh (bass), Dave Colvin (drums) and Mark Nathan (guitar). Wennerstrom said, "I feel like this is the strongest record I've ever done. I feel like playing with these guys, us all being so connected, really helped make it so fully realized. I'm really, really happy with it".

On December 1, 2011, the first single from Arrow, called "Parted Ways", was released exclusively on RollingStone.com and to the band's fans.

The band appeared at the Fonda Theater in Los Angeles on September 28, 2014, as part of "George Fest: A Night to Celebrate The Music of George Harrison". Their performance of "If Not For You", the Bob Dylan song Harrison included on his 1970 triple album All Things Must Pass, is included on the 2016 soundtrack album and in the concert film, also included as the third disc of the Vagrant/Hot Records package.

The band's fifth album, Restless Ones, was released on June 16, 2015.

Wennerstrom released her debut solo album, Sweet Unknown, in 2018.

The band's sixth album, A Beautiful Life, was released on September 10, 2021. The album was the first on their own label, Sweet Unknown Records. It was preceded by the singles "How Low" and "Revolution". Wennerstrom considered releasing the album as a solo effort, but then decided that the album was a continuation of the journey begun on the band's debut, Stairs and Elevators.

== Discography ==
- 2005 - Stairs and Elevators - Fat Possum Records
- 2006 - All This Time - Fat Possum Records
- 2009 - The Mountain - Fat Possum Records; No. 150 U.S.
- 2012 - Arrow - Partisan Records; No. 78 U.S.
- 2015 - Restless Ones - Partisan Records
- 2021 - A Beautiful Life - Sweet Unknown Records

== Television credits ==
- "Sway" was featured in season 4 for the television series Friday Night Lights, and included on the Friday Night Lights Vol. 2 soundtrack album. "All This Time" was featured in "Git Er 'Dun" (season 1, episode 5) of Friday Night Lights, but was not featured on the official soundtrack.
- "Got to Have Rock and Roll" was featured in "Discovery" (season 2 episode 4) of Suits, while "Marathon" was featured in "Blood in the Water" (season 2 episode 12) of the show.
- "Only for You" was featured in "The Path of the Righteous" (season 1 episode 11) of Daredevil as well as Chuck season 5 episode 4 "Chuck vs. The Business Trip".
- "Hi Line" and "Gates of Dawn" were performed live on Last Call with Carson Daly in November 2015.

== Reviews ==
- The Village Voice review of Stairs and Elevators
- Stylus Magazine review of Stairs and Elevators
- PopMatters review of Stairs and Elevators
- Blender review of Stairs and Elevators
- Prefixmag review of Stairs and Elevators
- Sponic Zine review of Stairs and Elevators
- Stylus Magazine review of All This Time
- Pitchfork review of All This Time
- Blender review of All This Time
- The Austin Chronicle review of All This Time
- Time review July 30, 2013
