= William Bender =

American music critic

William Bender (May 30, 1930 – May 4, 2014) was an American music critic who reviewed for the American Record Guide. A former music critic with the New York Herald Tribune and the World Journal Tribune, he was chief music critic for Time magazine from 1968 to 1978. He is the author of the Emmy Award winning documentary on Leopold Stokowski which aired on the National Educational Television and BBC networks in 1970. He is the co-author of the 1974 book The Tenors in which he profiled the life and career of opera singer Richard Tucker.

Bender earned a Master of Music from Columbia University where he also taught on the music faculty. He is a former faculty member of Syracuse University and Bradley University.

== Sources ==
- Profile of William Bender at Bradley University
- Obituary from the Peoria Journal Star
- Obituary from the New York Times
