= The Mountain (Heartless Bastards album) =

Studio album by Heartless Bastards
- Released: February 3, 2009
- Genre: Blues-rock
- Label: Fat Possum Records
- Producer: Mike McCarthy

Heartless Bastards chronology
| All This Time (2006) | The Mountain (2009) | Arrow (2012) |

Professional ratings
Review scores
| Source | Rating |
|---|---|
| Allmusic | link |
| Paste | (88/100) link |
| Pitchfork Media | (6.5/10) link |
| Rolling Stone | link |
| Spin | link |

The Mountain is the third album by American blues-rock band Heartless Bastards. It is their third release on Fat Possum Records and their first album without original drummer Kevin Vaughn and bassist Mike Lamping. The album was produced by Spoon producer Mike McCarthy and was released on February 3, 2009.

== Track listing ==
All tracks written by Erika Wennerstrom.

1. "The Mountain" – 5:19
2. "Could Be So Happy" – 3:51
3. "Early in the Morning" – 2:27
4. "Hold Your Head High" – 5:05
5. "Out at Sea" – 3:24
6. "Nothing Seems the Same" – 5:38
7. "Wide Awake" – 3:05
8. "So Quiet" – 2:41
9. "Had to Go" – 7:29
10. "Witchypoo" – 5:22
11. "Sway" – 5:53

== Personnel ==
- Erika Wennerstrom – guitar, vocals
- Marc Nathan – guitar
- Willie "Maceo 2" Rhodes – guitar
- Billy White – bass
- Doni Schroader – drums
- Zy Orange Lyn – violin, mandolin
