= Remember (John Lennon song) =

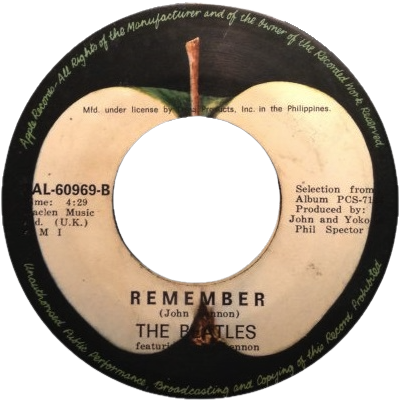
- Label from the Philippines single, released in 1971 with "Love" as the A-side

Song by John Lennon

from the album John Lennon/Plastic Ono Band
- Released: 11 December 1970
- Recorded: 9 October 1970
- Studio: EMI, London
- Genre: Rock
- Length: 4:36
- Label: Apple
- Songwriter: John Lennon
- Producers: John Lennon, Yoko Ono, Phil Spector

"Remember" is a song by the English rock musician John Lennon from his 1970 album John Lennon/Plastic Ono Band.

== Background and composition ==
Lennon played the piano riff that he would later develop for "Remember" at the end of the Beatles' July 1969 recording of George Harrison's song "Something". An unplanned improvisation, it led to an extended coda that was soon cut from the Beatles track.

When writing "Remember" in 1970, Lennon was influenced by his primal therapy sessions with Arthur Janov, and the lyrics reflect things typically remembered in therapy. The memories described are unpleasant ones, of conflict with family, authority and peers. The lyrics say "the hero was never hung, always got away", and describe parents "wishin' for movie stardom, always playin' a part".

At one point, the beat slows down and Lennon sings to himself that when things get crazy in the future, he should try to remember his current moment of respite. Rogan thinks that the moment of respite Lennon wants to remind himself to remember in crazy times is in his childhood, rather than the present day. Mellers explains that the song's construction creates for the listener by using a vocal melody that has no line but is rather made up of pentatonic fragments, and by using odd tonality which moves between unrelated chords.

At the end of the song, Lennon sings the lines "Remember, remember / The Fifth of November", followed by the sound of an explosion. The words are from the English nursery rhyme "Remember, Remember, the Fifth of November", and refer to Guy Fawkes Night, a British public holiday that is celebrated with fireworks and bonfires. Lennon told Jann Wenner of Rolling Stone that it was part of a lengthy ad-lib, and said he later decided that this line ought to be the culmination of the song. Whereas Guy Fawkes had failed in his plot to launch a Catholic uprising against James I in November 1605, Lennon believed it was an effective joke to suggest "we should blow up the Houses of Parliament".

One line from the song, "If you ever change your mind about leaving it all behind", was borrowed from the opening line of Sam Cooke's "Bring It On Home to Me", which Lennon later covered on Rock 'n' Roll. However, whereas Cooke was inviting a lover to come home to him, Lennon uses the line to suggest that "leaving it all behind" is impossible, and one should always be aware of one's past. Lennon goes on to sing that one should not feel sorry about or worry about the past.

== Recording ==
Lennon recorded "Remember" at EMI Studios on 9 October 1970, his 30th birthday. Earlier that day was the occasion of Lennon's last ever meeting with his father, Alf Lennon, who visited Lennon at his Tittenhurst Park home. The meeting was unsuccessful, as Lennon went into a primal therapy-inspired tirade against his father. Alf Lennon later recalled the meeting in a handwritten four-page statement, saying:

He launched into an account of his recent visit to America, and as the story unfolded, so the self-inflicted torture began to show in his face, and his voice rose to a scream as he likened himself to "Jimi Hendrix" and other pop stars who had recently departed from the scene, ending in a crescendo as he admitted he was "Bloody Mad, Insane" and due for an early demise ... There was no doubt whatsoever in my mind, that he meant every word he spoke. His countenance was frightful to behold.

In contrast to the raw emotion evident in Lennon's songs for the Plastic Ono Band album, the session on 9 October was a lighthearted occasion. During an early take of "Remember", Lennon sings "Happy Birthday ... to me ..." as drummer Ringo Starr and bassist Klaus Voormann play the backing track. The tapes also captured a visit by Harrison, who gave Lennon his new recording "It's Johnny's Birthday", and Lennon's delight at his former bandmate's arrival. Pop historian Robert Rodriguez highlights the warm exchange between Lennon, Harrison and Starr as a sign of the "'us against Paul [McCartney]' zeitgeist" that prevailed in the months following the Beatles' break-up in April.

Lennon plays piano on the track in staccato fashion. Rodriguez comments that early in the song, when Lennon begins to sing, Starr has to "compensate for John's erratic sense of rhythm", an example of the benefit to Lennon of working with a musician familiar with his quirks.

The original version of "Remember" was over eight minutes long. This version contained an organ overdub, more double-tracked vocals, and a Jew's harp. Lennon cut the recording down and added the closing explosion. A rehearsal take of "Remember", showing the musicians working on the song's tempo, appears on the 1998 box set John Lennon Anthology.

== Interpretations ==
"Remember" is one of several songs on John Lennon/Plastic Ono Band that Rodriguez views as documenting "a litany of letdowns". Music critic Wilfrid Mellers regards the theme of "Remember" to be the debunking of parents' dreams for their children as being as phony as television or movie scripts. Music critic Johnny Rogan raises similar issues, stating that the song addresses childhood years when morality is black and white and heroes and villains fit into their predefined roles with inevitable results.

According to Mellers, the song "literally" blows up the past with the Guy Fawkes Day explosion. Rogan believes that the quicker tempo and more prominent piano and drum playing leading up to the conclusion increase the drama and humour of the Guy Fawkes explosion. Rogan's interprets the explosion as being Lennon dramatising an alternate history in which the radical Fawkes succeeds. Authors Ken Bielen and Ben Urish consider the explosion "a stark ending to a surprisingly poignant song, the rupture of childhood trauma echoing in the adult in the form of half-recalled nursery rhymes".

Ultimate Classic Rock critic Nick DeRiso rated it as Lennon's 9th greatest solo political song, highlighting Ringo Starr's "angry, staccato musical backing" on drums.

== Personnel ==
The musicians who performed on the original recording were as follows:

- John Lennon – vocals, piano
- Ringo Starr – drums
- Klaus Voormann – bass guitar
