= Art of Dying (song) =

- Cover of the original Hansen Publishing sheet music for the song

Song by George Harrison

from the album All Things Must Pass
- Released: 27 November 1970
- Genre: Hard rock; proto-disco
- Length: 3:37
- Label: Apple
- Songwriter: George Harrison
- Producers: George Harrison, Phil Spector

"Art of Dying" (sometimes titled "The Art of Dying") is a song by English rock musician George Harrison from his 1970 triple album All Things Must Pass. Harrison began writing the song in 1966 while still a member of the Beatles and during a period when he had first become enamoured with Hindu-aligned spirituality and other aspects of Indian culture. The subject matter is reincarnation and the need to avoid rebirth, by limiting actions and thoughts that lead to one's soul returning in another, earthbound life form.

Harrison recorded "Art of Dying" in London shortly after the Beatles' break-up in April 1970. The song was co-produced by Phil Spector and features a hard rock arrangement. The backing musicians include Eric Clapton and the rest of Clapton's short-lived band Derek and the Dominos, as well as Gary Wright, Billy Preston, Bobby Keys and Jim Price. The song has received praise from several music critics; among these, James Hunter of Rolling Stone described it as a "spookily proto-disco" performance by "a rock orchestra recorded with sensitivity and teeth and faraway mikes".

Since Harrison's death in November 2001, the lyrics have received further recognition as a comment on the nature of human existence. The song has been interpreted in a jazz style by American guitarist Joel Harrison and as a grunge song by the band Black Rebel Motorcycle Club.

== Background and composition ==
For the last 30 or more years of his life, George Harrison repeatedly identified his first experience of taking the hallucinogenic drug LSD, with bandmate John Lennon and their wives Pattie Boyd and Cynthia Lennon, as being responsible for his interest in spirituality and Hinduism. The "trip" occurred by accident in March 1965 when the four drank coffee spiked with the drug, and he later recalled a thought coming to his mind during the experience: "'Yogis of the Himalayas.' I don't know why ... It was like somebody was whispering to me: 'Yogis of the Himalayas.'" An August 1967 visit to San Francisco's Haight-Ashbury district, then the epicentre of the hippie movement, persuaded him to abandon LSD and instead pursue a spiritual path through meditation. By that point, Harrison had already immersed himself in Indian classical music, which is irrevocably tied to spirituality, and dealt with what author Ian MacDonald terms "the spiritual aridity of modern life" in his Indian-influenced song "Within You Without You" from the Beatles' 1967 album Sgt. Pepper's Lonely Hearts Club Band.

Harrison began writing "Art of Dying" in 1966. Citing comments made by Harrison in a 1969 interview, musicologist Walter Everett says that Harrison possibly drew inspiration from the book The Psychedelic Experience: A Manual Based on the Tibetan Book of the Dead. The song is inspired by the Hindu conception of reincarnation and the inevitability of death, as outlined in the opening verse:

There'll come a time when all of us must leave here
There's nothing Sister Mary can do, will keep me here with you
As nothing in this life that I've been trying
Can equal or surpass the Art of Dying.

According to author Alan Clayson, the song's title and subject matter suggest a familiarity with the fifteenth-century Latin text Ars moriendi (lit. "The Art of Dying"). The mention of "Sister Mary" refers to the Catholic faith in which Harrison had been raised. Speaking to author Peter Doggett, Harrison's sister Louise qualified his embrace of Hinduism with regard to his upbringing: "Our family were Catholics, but we always had a global outlook. We were spiritual, not religious as such. George didn't change as a person after he went to India [in 1966] …" Rather than "Sister Mary", Harrison's original lyric named "Mr Epstein" (Brian Epstein, the Beatles' former manager). Author Bruce Spizer speculates that Harrison was "contemplating life after the Beatles" as early as mid 1966, since "most of the song's original verses recognise that even Mr. Epstein won't be able to keep the group together or help out when it's over..."

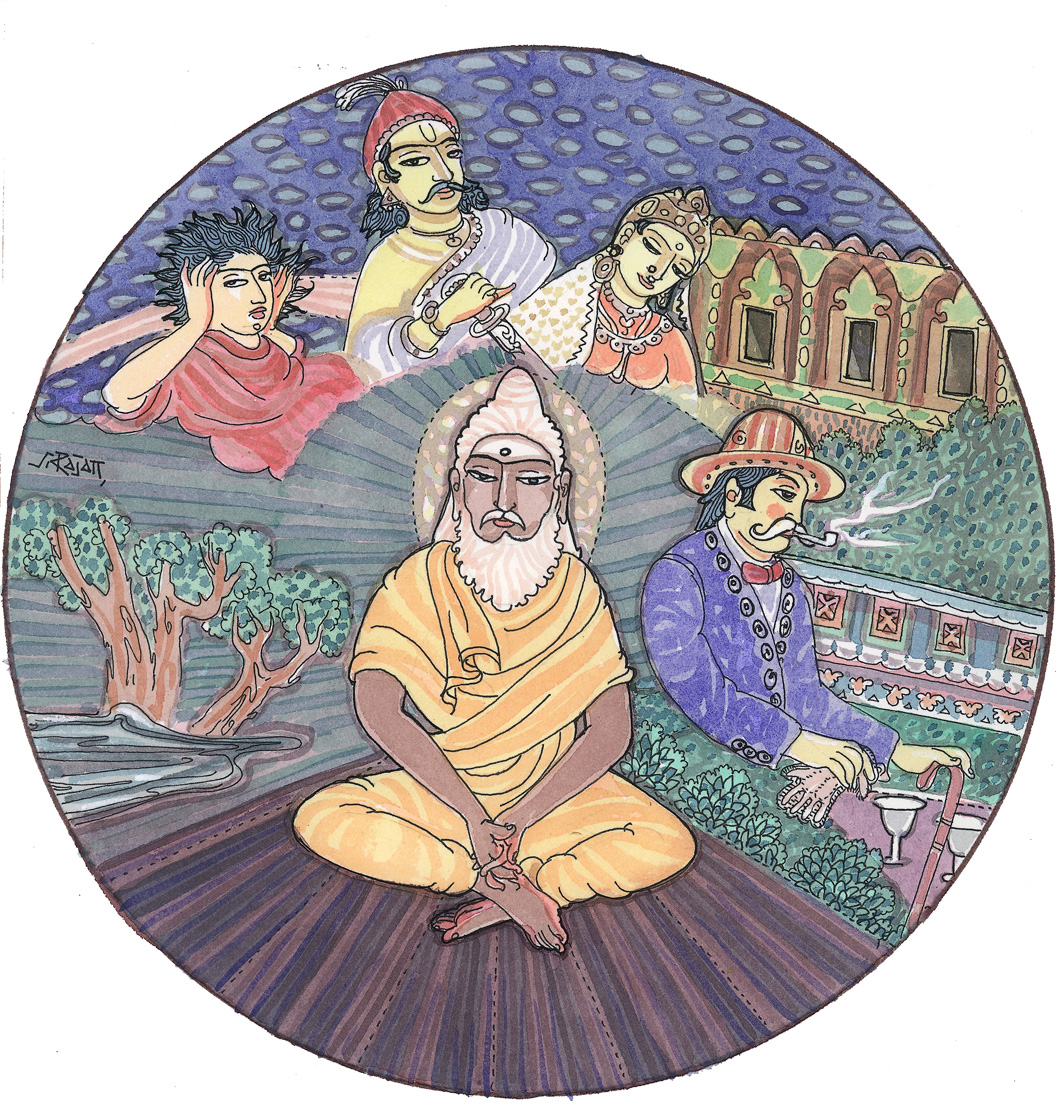
A depiction of the Hindu view of reincarnation, whereby the self or soul (atman) repeatedly takes on a physical body, until moksha. The concept forms the basis of Harrison's lyrics in "Art of Dying".

Harrison says in his autobiography, I, Me, Mine, that in most cases one's soul does not in fact "leave here" after death, due to the karmic debt, or "load", accrued through actions and thoughts carried out in one's lifetime. This point is illustrated in the third verse of "Art of Dying":

There'll come a time when most of us return here
Brought back by our desire to be a perfect entity
Living through a million years of crying
Until you realize the Art of Dying.

The mention of "a million years of crying" is a reference to the endless cycle of rebirth associated with reincarnation, where the soul repeatedly fails to leave the material world and attain nirvana or moksha.

Written in a period shortly before "karma", "mantra", "guru" and "māyā" all became key words in his vocabulary, Harrison shows an acknowledgment of possible confusion on the part of his listeners, and a degree of humour, with the questions that appear at the end of the verses, "Are you still with me?" and "Do you believe me?" The subject of rebirth was one he would return to frequently throughout his solo career, notably on "Give Me Love (Give Me Peace on Earth)", with its pleas "Keep me free from birth" and "Help me cope with this heavy load". (Note: Other examples include "Living in the Material World", "Simply Shady" and "Circles".)

== Recording ==
I've got about 40 tunes I haven't recorded [with the Beatles], and some of them I think are quite good. I wrote one called "The Art of Dying" three years ago, and at that time I thought it was too far out. But I'm still going to record it.

— George Harrison, September 1969

"Art of Dying" was one of many compositions that Harrison stockpiled during the Beatles' career due to the continued dominance of Lennon and Paul McCartney as the band's principal songwriters. When discussing his plans for a solo album in an October 1969 interview, Harrison referred to "Art of Dying", saying that he had been "working on a song about reincarnation since 1966". On 26 May 1970, a month after the Beatles' official break-up, it was one of at least fifteen songs performed by Harrison for producer Phil Spector's benefit at Abbey Road Studios in London, with a view to narrowing down the material under consideration for All Things Must Pass. (Note: Along with "Isn't It a Pity", which also dated from 1966, "Art of Dying" was the oldest of the songs Harrison recorded for All Things Must Pass.) Harrison performed the song on acoustic guitar, but as with "Isn't It a Pity", "Run of the Mill", "Let It Down" and other selections, its arrangement was expanded significantly as the sessions progressed. In the case of "Art of Dying", Spector gave the track a heavy production for the official release; authors Chip Madinger and Mark Easter describe the production as a "[big] 'kitchen sink' job". A widely bootlegged version known as "Art of Dying (Take 9)", comprising a band performance dominated by acoustic rhythm guitars and piano with Ringo Starr on drums, sees the song somewhere between the solo run-through and the All Things Must Pass arrangement. This take, played in the key of B♭ minor (a semitone up from that of the official version of the song), was still in contention for release during the album's mixing phase. (Note: The master tape sheet lists take 9 as "Art of Dying (Version One)", with drums, bass, "stereo guitars", piano, percussion and vocals filling seven of the available tracks on the 8-track tape.)

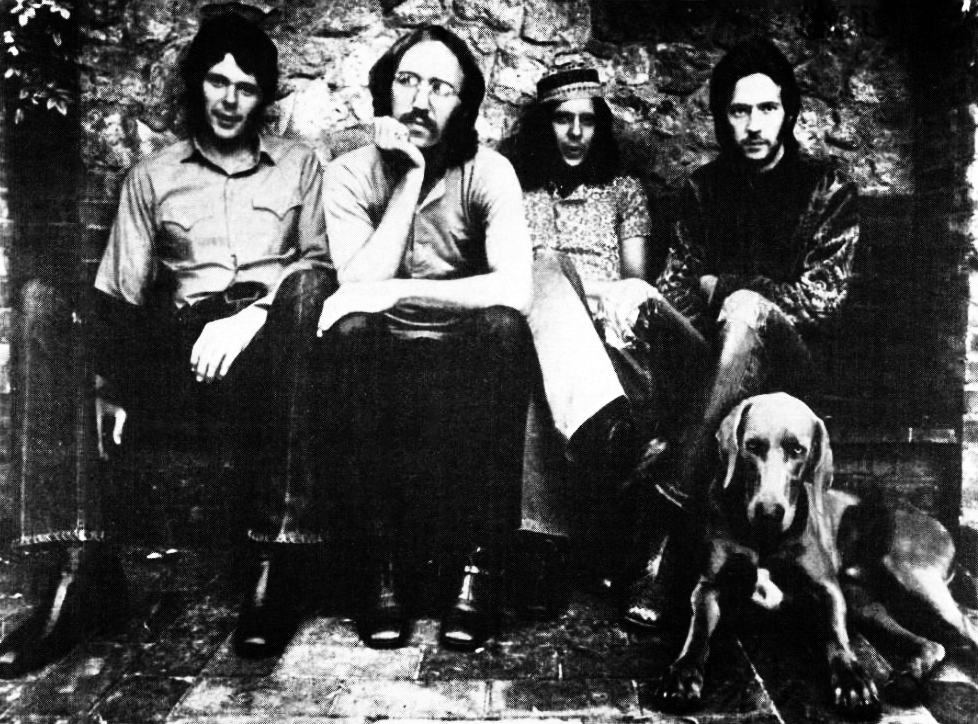
Derek and the Dominos' Jim Gordon, Carl Radle, Bobby Whitlock and Eric Clapton, pictured in 1970

In a chapter discussing All Things Must Pass in his 2010 autobiography, American musician Bobby Whitlock writes of recording the song: "It was awesome when we were doing 'The Art of Dying,' Eric [Clapton] on that wah-wah and it was all cooking, Derek and the Dominos with George Harrison." The sessions led to the formation of Derek and the Dominos, whose four members – Clapton, Whitlock, Carl Radle and Jim Gordon – all played on the track. In a 1990 interview, Clapton said, "We made our bones, really, on that album with George", since the four musicians had no formal plans to work as a band prior.

The released version of "Art of Dying" is in a hard rock style. The track begins with what author Elliot Huntley terms Clapton's "firecracking" lead guitar, and is propelled by Gordon's drumming and Radle's bass guitar. (Note: Simon Leng considers Clapton's guitar riff to be partly an adaptation of a "lick" played by Harrison on the Beatles' 1969 song "The End". He adds: "['The End'] had been a track on which Harrison was lauded for sounding like Clapton. Reincarnation indeed.") Jim Price's horn arrangement provides a countermelody to the various A minor voicings in the song's instrumental passages through to its "galloping" ending. Testifying to the ferocity of the performance, Phil Collins later recalled that his hands were so badly blistered during the run-throughs of the song, he was unable to play his congas with any force once they came to record the track. Although congas are absent in the final mix, the recording includes other percussion parts.

Harrison listed Collins as a contributor on the 2001 reissue of All Things Must Pass. However, Collins writes in his 2016 autobiography that this credit was merely out of kindness, and that he did not play on the released version of "Art of Dying". In Collins' recollection, the session he attended for the song was an earlier take from May 1970, featuring a different musical arrangement and with Starr, Klaus Voormann and Billy Preston as the other musicians. (Note: He has also said that Mal Evans, members of Badfinger and Maurice Gibb were present at the session.) Before giving Collins the mistaken credit in 2001, Harrison sent him a tape that he said was a recording of the song with his conga playing. Collins recalled in a 2016 interview, "I thought, Oh, my god, this sounds terrible." Collins added that the tape was a practical joke at his expense, since Harrison had asked percussionist Ray Cooper to deliberately play poorly, saying: "Play bad, I'm going to record it and send it to Phil."

== Release and reception ==
… and then there was the world after the Beatles, when [Harrison] and his music seemed to open up and flower. I will never forget the first time I heard All Things Must Pass ... It was like walking into a cathedral. George was making spiritually awake music – we all heard and felt it ...

— Martin Scorsese, recalling the release of "Art of Dying" and Harrison's other spiritually themed songs on All Things Must Pass

Apple Records released All Things Must Pass on 27 November 1970, with "Art of Dying" sequenced as the second track on side four, in the triple album's original, LP format. While describing the positive response to the album, author Robert Rodriguez includes the song as an illustration of how Harrison's talent had been "hidden in plain sight" behind Lennon and McCartney during the Beatles' career. Rodriguez writes: "That the Quiet Beatle was capable of such range – from the joyful 'What Is Life' to the meditative 'Isn't It a Pity' to the steamrolling 'Art of Dying' to the playful 'I Dig Love' – was revelatory." On 10 December, a portion of the song was included in a segment on the UK television show Top of the Pops that focused on All Things Must Pass.

The album's release coincided with a period when religion and spirituality was emerging as a popular theme in rock music and youth culture. "Art of Dying" exemplified Harrison's focus on Hindu-aligned religious concepts as a solo artist from 1970 onwards. In his contemporary review for Rolling Stone, Ben Gerson wrote of the wide range of styles found on All Things Must Pass and recognised "Art of Dying" as "a song of reincarnation" with a melody that he likened to "Paint It Black" by the Rolling Stones. Village Voice contributor Nicholas Schaffner described it as an "essay" on the subject of reincarnation. In December 1972, Andrew Davies of Record Mirror cited the song in his assessment of the Beatles as solo artists, saying that All Things Must Pass and Harrison's organisation of the 1971 Concert for Bangladesh project ensured he had "far surpassed" Lennon and McCartney since the band's break-up. Davies said that Harrison's lyrics "never sink into banality or become pretentious" and so he could address the themes in "Art of Dying" "without becoming slushy and sentimental".

Reviewing the 30th anniversary edition of the album, James Hunter of Rolling Stone enthused about the performance: "Imagine a rock orchestra recorded with sensitivity and teeth and faraway mikes: bluesy and intricate on Harrison and Dylan's 'I'd Have You Anytime,' fizzy on 'Apple Scruffs,' grooving on 'Let It Down,' and spookily proto-disco on 'Art of Dying.'" In another 2001 review, for The New York Times, Jody Rosen grouped "Art of Dying" with "Wah-Wah" and "Hear Me Lord" as examples of how Spector successfully transformed Harrison's compositions on an "operatic scale". Rosen added: "The symphonic squall of these songs seems less about rock star hubris than Mr. Harrison's straining to express outsized emotions – sorrow, regret, longing, writ very large." (Note: Reviewing Starsailor's album Silence Is Easy in 2004, Jason Heller of Westword said that the track "Four to the Floor" was "eerily similar" to "Art of Dying", a gesture he viewed as "either mocking or paying tribute to Spector" after Starsailor had dismissed Spector from the project.)

In his feature on Harrison's solo career for Goldmine magazine in 2002, Dave Thompson paired "Art of Dying" with "Beware of Darkness" as songs that "rate among the finest compositions of Harrison's entire career". Writing for Uncut in 2008, David Cavanagh said that, while "My Sweet Lord" was the best-known of the spiritually themed songs on All Things Must Pass, "Art of Dying" was the most "far-sighted", with a lyric that "saw the 27-year-old Harrison prepare for death in an ecstasy of resolved, purified karma". Writing in 1001 Albums You Must Hear Before You Die, Andrew Gilbert highlights "Art of Dying" as an example of the "finely crafted, spiritually charged songs" that ensure that All Things Must Pass "only sounds better with time". Damian Fanelli of Guitar World includes the song among the best of Clapton's many collaborations with members of the Beatles, describing it as "outstanding" and "wah-tastic ... the closest Harrison got to hard rock as a solo artist".

== Legacy ==
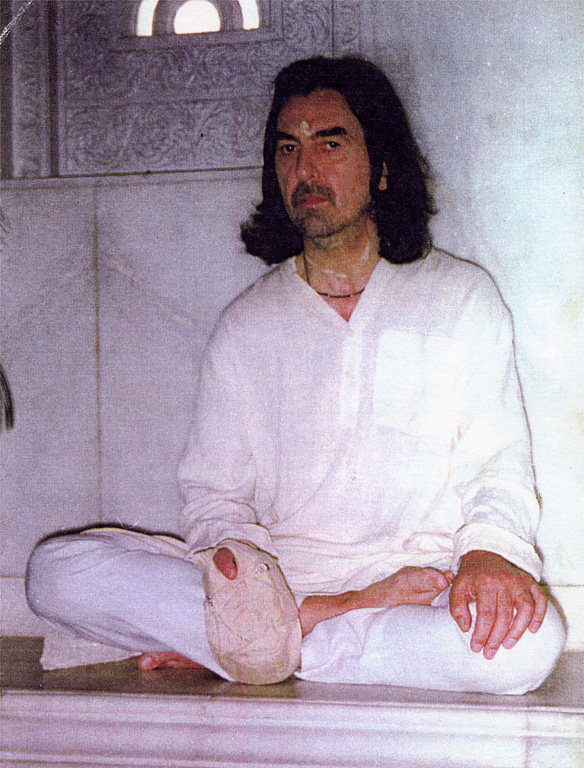
Harrison in the Hindu holy city of Vrindavan in 1996

Mikal Gilmore of Rolling Stone concluded his 2002 article "The Mystery Inside George" with a comment on the relevance of "Art of Dying" to Harrison's legacy. He said the song reflected Harrison's recognition that manifesting love is "among the highest purposes of life" as well as an appreciation that "Sometime darkness is irrefutable, and sometimes love and understanding can't save a troubled heart or a soul in harm's way." Gilmore added that the "love story" surrounding the Beatles best illustrated such a "dichotomy" and none of the band members "carried that knowledge with greater weight, yearning or honor than George Harrison".

In Martin Scorsese's 2011 documentary George Harrison: Living in the Material World, the song's significance is highlighted in the context of the knife attack Harrison endured in December 1999, two years before his death from cancer, when an intruder broke into his home in Oxfordshire. In his article on the film, Joe Bosso of Music Radar says that "mastering the art of dying" had been Harrison's prime concern during his final years; he cites Olivia Harrison's and Starr's respective comments as indicating that Harrison achieved his spiritual goal. Harrison's son Dhani supported this contention in a 2002 interview, and he said that his father had found a contentment and lightheartedness that contrasted with the "more serious" outlook evident in "Art of Dying" and "All Things Must Pass". (Note: Shortly after Harrison's death, drummer Jim Keltner similarly reflected: "George has been prepared for this for a long time. Just listen to his songs; for instance, he wrote and sang 'The Art of Dying' over 30 years ago ... It's us who weren't prepared. So we flounder around looking for words to try and describe him and flounder around deal[ing] with not ever hearing his voice again, ya know.")

On the 2002 Hare Krishna Tribute to George Harrison DVD, in which devotees from the Radha Krishna Temple (London) offered their reminiscences on Harrison, Shyamsundar Das, a lifelong devotee, expressed his certainty that Harrison had achieved a state of transcendence in line with Hindu teachings. Shyamsundar quoted from the lyrics to "Art of Dying" while remarking that Harrison had successfully grasped the principles of moksha even by the late 1960s. Also in 2002, a Beliefnet writer commented on Harrison's preparations for death and wrote of the song:

In "Art of Dying", Harrison reminds us that death is life's greatest opportunity. There comes a time when each of us must leave this material world, and no amount of prayer and science can keep us here – but what we truly are does not cease to be. The Bhagavad-Gita teaches that "Never was there a time when I did not exist, nor you, nor all these kings; nor in the future shall any of us cease to be."

New Zealand Herald journalist Graham Reid cited the song's lyrics and Harrison's example in an article he wrote about the contrasting ways that individuals face the notion of death and live accordingly.

In January 1991, Starr contributed a preface to the book Walking After Midnight in which he reproduced Harrison's I, Me, Mine entry on "Art of Dying". The book followed the 1988 documentary film Walking After Midnight, in which well-known figures such as Starr, Martin Sheen, Willie Nelson, Donovan and the Dalai Lama speculate on their past incarnations. (Note: Author Gary Tillery states that the Beatles could have released a final "first-rank" album drawn from All Things Must Pass alone. In such a scenario, he visualises Starr as the lead vocalist on "Art of Dying" and "What Is Life".) Gary J. Moore of the Staten Island Advance referenced Harrison's song and Olivia's description of her husband's passing in his review of Katy Butler's 2019 book The Art of Dying Well, in which Butler outlines practical steps to prepare for death. (Note: In 2016, after the Catholic Church warned against pantheism and launched a website titled The Art of Dying Well, a BBC News report commented: "[The] website coincidentally shares its name with George Harrison's 1970 song, whose lyrics appear to reject the Catholicism of 'Sister Mary' and turn towards the pantheistic spirituality of Hinduism.")

Among Harrison biographers, Elliot Huntley describes "Art of Dying" as "certainly the most dramatic" track on All Things Must Pass and "one of the most scintillating rock songs in the Harrison canon". Ian Inglis writes that "Art of Dying" fully reflects Harrison's "post-Beatles confidence" and notes the Middle Eastern "musical antecedents" despite the obvious Hindu concepts within the lyrics. In his book While My Guitar Gently Weeps, Simon Leng views "Art of Dying" as picking up "where 'Tomorrow Never Knows' and 'Within You Without You' paused", and adds: "If ever a song challenged the one-eyed nature of the rock world, this is it. Nothing could be further from superficial pop culture."

== Other versions ==
Harrison never performed "Art of Dying" live, although he included it in his proposed setlist for the Concert for Bangladesh, which took place at Madison Square Garden in New York on 1 August 1971. Jim Horn's horn chart for the song is reproduced at the end of I, Me, Mine. The acoustic demo of "Art of Dying" from May 1970 has been available unofficially since the 1990s on the bootleg Beware of ABKCO! Early mixes of the released track, showing the recording at various stages during the overdubbing process, have been issued on the bootlegs The Making of All Things Must Pass and Songs for Patti – The Mastertape Version. The latter also includes the discarded "Take 9" version.

Jazz guitarist Joel Harrison covered "Art of Dying" on his 2005 album Harrison on Harrison: Jazz Explorations of George Harrison. At the George Fest tribute concert in Los Angeles in September 2014, "Art of Dying" was performed by Black Rebel Motorcycle Club. Their version appears on the 2016 film and album release from the event, co-produced by Dhani Harrison. (Note: Dhani organised the 2014 concert to showcase his father's influence on a more diverse range of artists than had been the case at the all-star Concert for George in November 2002.) In a subsequent interview, Dhani highlighted this version as one of the George Fest performances that had particularly impressed him, saying: "I didn't realize that was like grunge until I saw BRMC play it; I was like, 'Oh. This is a shoegazey grunge song!' They unlocked that song for me." Megan Volpert of PopMatters similarly considers it to be one of the concert's two "particularly great, more interpretive covers". She highlights the use of slide guitar as a "bold" new feature, given the reverence afforded Harrison's slide playing. In his review for American Songwriter, Hal Horowitz also considers BRMC's performance to be among the best at George Fest and he describes the song as a "seldom heard Harrison gem".

== Personnel ==
According to Simon Leng, the following musicians played on "Art of Dying":

- George Harrison – vocals, electric guitars, backing vocals
- Eric Clapton – electric guitar
- Gary Wright – electric piano
- Billy Preston – organ
- Bobby Whitlock – tubular bells (Note: Madinger and Easter write that the various in-progress mixes of "Art of Dying" reveal the presence of tubular bells on the recording but make no mention of a piano part, for which Leng credits Whitlock as playing. In his autobiography, Whitlock states that his contribution was the tubular bells, which he played with a leather hammer.)
- Carl Radle – bass
- Jim Gordon – drums
- Jim Price – trumpets, horn arrangement
- Bobby Keys – saxophone
- uncredited – percussion

== Sources ==
- Dale C. Allison Jr., The Love There That's Sleeping: The Art and Spirituality of George Harrison, Continuum (New York, NY, 2006; ISBN 978-0-8264-1917-0).
- Keith Badman, The Beatles Diary Volume 2: After the Break-Up 1970–2001, Omnibus Press (London, 2001; ISBN 0-7119-8307-0).
- The Beatles, The Beatles Anthology, Chronicle Books (San Francisco, CA, 2000; ISBN 0-8118-2684-8).
- Harry Castleman & Walter J. Podrazik, All Together Now: The First Complete Beatles Discography 1961–1975, Ballantine Books (New York, NY, 1976; ISBN 0-345-25680-8).
- Alan Clayson, George Harrison, Sanctuary (London, 2003; ISBN 1-86074-489-3).
- Phil Collins, Not Dead Yet: The Memoir, Crown Archetype (New York, NY, 2016; ISBN 978-1-101-90747-4).
- Peter Doggett, You Never Give Me Your Money: The Beatles After the Breakup, It Books (New York, NY, 2011; ISBN 978-0-06-177418-8).
- The Editors of Rolling Stone, Harrison, Rolling Stone Press/Simon & Schuster (New York, NY, 2002; ISBN 0-7432-3581-9).
- Walter Everett, The Beatles as Musicians: Revolver Through the Anthology, Oxford University Press (New York, NY, 1999; ISBN 0-19-509553-7).
- Michael Frontani, "The Solo Years", in Kenneth Womack (ed.), The Cambridge Companion to the Beatles, Cambridge University Press (Cambridge, UK, 2009; ISBN 978-1-139-82806-2), pp. 153–82.
- Joshua M. Greene, Here Comes the Sun: The Spiritual and Musical Journey of George Harrison, John Wiley & Sons (Hoboken, NJ, 2006; ISBN 978-0-470-12780-3).
- George Harrison, I Me Mine, Chronicle Books (San Francisco, CA, 2002; ISBN 0-8118-3793-9).
- Olivia Harrison, George Harrison: Living in the Material World, Abrams (New York, NY, 2011; ISBN 978-1-4197-0220-4).
- Bill Harry, The George Harrison Encyclopedia, Virgin Books (London, 2003; ISBN 978-0753508220).
- Elliot J. Huntley, Mystical One: George Harrison – After the Break-up of the Beatles, Guernica Editions (Toronto, ON, 2006; ISBN 1-55071-197-0).
- Ian Inglis, The Words and Music of George Harrison, Praeger (Santa Barbara, CA, 2010; ISBN 978-0-313-37532-3).
- Simon Leng, While My Guitar Gently Weeps: The Music of George Harrison, Hal Leonard (Milwaukee, WI, 2006; ISBN 1-4234-0609-5).
- Cynthia Lennon, John, Hodder & Stoughton (London, 2006; ISBN 0-340-89512-8).
- Ian MacDonald, Revolution in the Head: The Beatles' Records and the Sixties, Pimlico (London, 1998; ISBN 0-7126-6697-4).
- Chip Madinger & Mark Easter, Eight Arms to Hold You: The Solo Beatles Compendium, 44.1 Productions (Chesterfield, MO, 2000; ISBN 0-615-11724-4).
- Chris O'Dell (with Katherine Ketcham), Miss O'Dell: My Hard Days and Long Nights with The Beatles, The Stones, Bob Dylan, Eric Clapton, and the Women They Loved, Touchstone (New York, NY, 2009; ISBN 978-1-4165-9093-4).
- Robert Rodriguez, Fab Four FAQ 2.0: The Beatles' Solo Years, 1970–1980, Backbeat Books (Milwaukee, WI, 2010; ISBN 978-1-4165-9093-4).
- Nicholas Schaffner, The Beatles Forever, McGraw-Hill (New York, NY, 1978; ISBN 0-07-055087-5).
- Bruce Spizer, The Beatles Solo on Apple Records, 498 Productions (New Orleans, LA, 2005; ISBN 0-9662649-5-9).
- Gary Tillery, Working Class Mystic: A Spiritual Biography of George Harrison, Quest Books (Wheaton, IL, 2011; ISBN 978-0-8356-0900-5).
- Richie Unterberger, The Unreleased Beatles: Music & Film, Backbeat Books (San Francisco, CA, 2006; ISBN 978-0-87930-892-6).
- Bobby Whitlock (with Marc Roberty), Bobby Whitlock: A Rock 'n' Roll Autobiography, McFarland (Jefferson, NC, 2010; ISBN 978-0-7864-6190-5).
