= George Fest =

Live album by Various artists
- Released: 26 February 2016
- Recorded: 28 September 2014
- Venue: Fonda Theatre, Los Angeles
- Genre: Rock
- Label: BMG, HOT
- Producer: Dhani Harrison, David Zonshine

Professional ratings
Review scores
Source	Rating
AllMusic	3/5 stars
American Songwriter	4.5/5 stars
Blurt	5/5 stars
Consequence of Sound	C+
Glide Magazine	7/10 stars
Mojo	4/5 stars
Pitchfork	6.8/10
PopMatters	8/10 stars
Renowned for Sound	3.5/5 stars
Rolling Stone	2.5/5 stars
Uncut	7/10

George Fest – subtitled A Night to Celebrate the Music of George Harrison – is a live album and concert DVD package documenting the George Fest tribute concert to former Beatle George Harrison, held at the Fonda Theatre in Los Angeles on 28 September 2014. The album and documentary were released on 26 February 2016.

The 2014 concert coincided with the reissue of Harrison's Apple Records solo albums. Among the many performers were Brian Wilson and Al Jardine of the Beach Boys, Dhani Harrison, Norah Jones, Wayne Coyne and Steven Drozd of the Flaming Lips, Conan O'Brien, Spoon's Britt Daniel, and Brandon Flowers of the Killers. Other performers included Ben Harper, "Weird Al" Yankovic, Ann Wilson of Heart, and Ian Astbury.

== Track listing ==
All songs by George Harrison unless otherwise noted.

Disc one

No.	Title	Main performer(s)	Length
1.	"Introduction"	Conan O'Brien	0:50
2.	"Old Brown Shoe"	Conan O'Brien	3:54
3.	"I Me Mine"	Britt Daniel	2:28
4.	"Ballad of Sir Frankie Crisp (Let It Roll)"	Jonathan Bates, Dhani Harrison	4:23
5.	"Something"	Norah Jones	3:13
6.	"Got My Mind Set on You" (Rudy Clark)	Brandon Flowers	4:29
7.	"If Not for You" (Bob Dylan)	Heartless Bastards	3:34
8.	"Be Here Now"	Ian Astbury	4:06
9.	"Wah-Wah"	Nick Valensi	5:26
10.	"If I Needed Someone"	Jamestown Revival	2:20
11.	"Art of Dying"	Black Rebel Motorcycle Club	4:14
12.	"Savoy Truffle"	Dhani Harrison	2:58
13.	"For You Blue"	Chase Cohl, Brian Bell	2:29
14.	"Beware of Darkness"	Ann Wilson	3:46

Disc two

No.	Title	Main performer(s)	Length
1.	"Let It Down"	Dhani Harrison	6:05
2.	"Give Me Love (Give Me Peace on Earth)"	Ben Harper	3:37
3.	"Here Comes the Sun"	Perry Farrell	3:13
4.	"What Is Life"	"Weird Al" Yankovic	4:18
5.	"Behind That Locked Door"	Norah Jones	3:09
6.	"My Sweet Lord"	Brian Wilson, Al Jardine	5:21
7.	"Isn't It a Pity"	The Black Ryder	6:02
8.	"Any Road"	Butch Walker	4:13
9.	"I'd Have You Anytime" (Harrison, Dylan)	Karen Elson	3:05
10.	"Taxman"	Cold War Kids	3:32
11.	"It's All Too Much"	The Flaming Lips	8:21
12.	"Handle with Care" (Harrison, Dylan, Jeff Lynne, Tom Petty, Roy Orbison)	Brandon Flowers, Dhani Harrison, Jonathan Bates, "Weird Al" Yankovic, Britt Daniel, Wayne Coyne	3:25
13.	"All Things Must Pass"	Ann Wilson, Dhani Harrison, Karen Elson, Norah Jones	3:57

== Charts ==
Chart (2016)	Peak position
Australian Albums (ARIA)	41
US Billboard 200	114
