= Harrison on Harrison =

Studio album by Joel Harrison
- Released: October 25, 2005
- Studio: Peter Karl Recording Studio, Brooklyn, NY; Systems Two, Brooklyn, NY
- Genre: Jazz
- Length: 71:00
- Label: HighNote
- Producer: Joel Harrison

Harrison on Harrison, subtitled Jazz Explorations of George Harrison, is an album by the American jazz guitarist and arranger Joel Harrison released in October 2005. It contains jazz interpretations of ten songs written by the former Beatle George Harrison, who died in November 2001, together with a version of the gospel standard "In My Father's House".

== Inspiration and recording ==
In his liner notes to the CD, Harrison says he was inspired to record the album after being invited to perform a short set of George Harrison's songs at the 2002 New York Guitar Festival. In his selection of compositions for the album, he was drawn to the former Beatle's incorporation of a wide range of musical styles in his work, namely, "country, blues, British hymns and ballads, rock and roll, gospel, psychedelia, Indian music, and early jazz". He adds of George Harrison's songs: "They combine aching beauty and biting wit, spiritual longing and earthy humor, simple modal vamps and sophisticated harmony, mystical ballads and bashing beats."

Harrison also credited the Beatles' guitarist with introducing him to Indian classical music, which he studied at the Ali Akbar College of Music in California. In a 2014 interview for Guitar Player, Harrison said that part of the attraction of making Harrison on Harrison – as with his 2003 album of country and folk covers, Free Country – was that the material was not usually played by jazz artists, and so these projects were "essentially my way of creating my own jazz repertoire".

Harrison recorded the album in Brooklyn, New York backed by jazz musicians such as David Liebman, David Binney and Uri Caine. He and Liebman wrote the musical arrangements for the songs. Although mostly instrumental pieces, the tracks include vocals by Harrison and, on "All Things Must Pass", a guest appearance by singer Jen Chapin.

== Release and reception ==
Professional ratings
Review scores
Source	Rating
All About Jazz	4.5/5 stars
AllMusic	4/5 stars
JazzTimes	(mixed)

Harrison on Harrison was released by HighNote Records on October 25, 2005. James Christopher Monger of AllMusic describes it as one of the artist's "critically lauded albums".

In his contemporary review for All About Jazz, John Kelman admired the album as another successful jazz interpretation of an alternative musical form by Joel Harrison, following his earlier adaptations of material by artists such as Johnny Cash and Woody Guthrie. Kelman highlighted the modal arrangements on "Here Comes the Sun" and "Within You Without You", the last of which he likened to Miles Davis' experimentation with Indian rhythms during the late 1960s and early 1970s. Writing in JazzTimes, Russell Carlson began his review with: "Jazz guitarist Joel Harrison plays the music of rock guitarist George Harrison … Does the slight novelty of a shared surname justify paying jazz tribute to a rock god? About half the time it does." While praising the musicianship throughout, Carlson rued the inclusion of vocals on selections such as "The Art of Dying" and "My Sweet Lord", which he otherwise considered to be a "wonderfully sparse, steel-guitar rendition”.

Matt Collar of AllMusic describes Harrison on Harrison as "an adventurous and forward-thinking album that celebrates not only the former Beatle's superb songcraft, but also his sense of musical exploration". Collar admires Harrison's reading of "Within You Without You", for "expanding the raga-psych elements of the original into a post-bop wilderness of angular improvisation", and "While My Guitar Gently Weeps", for its musical journey "from a woozily funky Indian beat on the main verse, to a drunken soft-rock bridge that sounds something like guitarist Adrian Belew covering Burt Bacharach". He concludes: "Harrison on Harrison is an inspired, engaging and superbly executed tribute to a true music original."

== Track listing ==
All songs written by George Harrison except where noted.

1. "Here Comes the Sun" – 5:59
2. "Within You Without You" – 8:09
3. "While My Guitar Gently Weeps" – 7:44
4. "The Art of Dying" – 6:41
5. "My Father's House" (trad.) – 7:20
6. "All Things Must Pass" – 6:30
7. "Taxman" – 5:44
8. "My Sweet Lord" – 4:45
9. "Love You To" – 7:20
10. "Beware of Darkness" – 5:14
11. "Isn't It a Pity" – 5:49

== Personnel ==
- Joel Harrison – electric, National Steel, slide and fretless guitars; vocal; musical arrangements
- David Liebman – soprano and tenor saxophones, wood flute; musical arrangements
- David Binney – alto saxophone
- Uri Caine – piano, Fender Rhodes
- Stephan Crump – bass
- Dan Weiss – drums
- Todd Isler – percussion
- Gary Versace – piano (track 9)
- Rob Burger – B3 organ (track 11)
- Jen Chapin – vocal (track 6)
