= Free Country =

Free Country may refer to:

- Free Country (TV series), 1978 American sitcom
- Free Country (album), 2003 album by Joel Harrison
- Free Country, USA, the fictional setting of the Homestar Runner cartoon series
- Free Country (politics), description of a political concept

== See also ==
- Free speech by country
