= Beware of Darkness (song) =

Song by George Harrison

from the album All Things Must Pass
- Released: 27 November 1970
- Genre: Rock
- Length: 3:48
- Label: Apple
- Songwriter: George Harrison
- Producers: George Harrison, Phil Spector

"Beware of Darkness" is a song by English rock musician George Harrison from his 1970 triple album All Things Must Pass. It is the opening track on the second disc of the album. The lyrics warn against allowing illusion to get in the way of one's true purpose in life, an admonition that, like the content of "My Sweet Lord", reflects the influence of Harrison's association with the Radha Krishna Temple. Several critics recognise the song as one of the best tracks on All Things Must Pass.

Harrison performed "Beware of Darkness" with Leon Russell at the Concert for Bangladesh in 1971. Eric Clapton performed it in tribute to Harrison at the Concert for George in 2002. The song has also been recorded by Leon Russell, Marianne Faithfull, Spock's Beard, Concrete Blonde, Matthew Sweet and Susanna Hoffs, and Sheryl Crow.

== Background and inspiration ==
"Beware of Darkness" was one of the more recent songs included on All Things Must Pass, George Harrison's first post-Beatles solo album, and his first to consist of songs. When playing it to Phil Spector, his co-producer, in May 1970, he introduced it as "the last one I wrote, the other day".

The song's lyrics reflect the influence of the Radha Krishna Temple, whose philosophy holds that spiritual concerns override all material things. Since meeting the Radha Krishna devotees in December 1968, Harrison had produced their devotional music for Apple Records, including the 1969 single "Hare Krishna Mantra", and assisted in securing a property in central London as their temple. He told the devotees that his 1969 Beatles composition "Something" was a love song to the Hindu deity Krishna rather than to his wife, Pattie Boyd.

In spring 1970, Harrison invited some of the movement's members to stay at Friar Park, his recently purchased estate in Oxfordshire, to help him restore the large house and overgrown gardens, and to give his new home an intensely spiritual atmosphere. In his 1980 autobiography, I, Me, Mine, Harrison says he wrote "Beware of Darkness" at this time. He adds: "I had some of my friends from the Radha Krishna Temple staying: 'Watch out for Māya' ... The lyrics are self-explanatory.

According to American keyboardist Bobby Whitlock, the song was partly informed by Harrison's difficulties with his former Beatles bandmates and their business manager, Allen Klein, in the period immediately after the band's break-up. Whitlock, who also stayed at Friar Park, cites this as one of several preoccupations that made up "a day in the life of George Harrison", along with the stresses of restoring the property with Boyd, dealing with Spector's idiosyncrasies, and indulging the Hare Krishna devotees. (Note: Among his comments on making All Things Must Pass, Whitlock has criticised the devotees as an unwelcome distraction in the recording studio and as having abused Harrison's financial generosity. Whitlock also recalls gaining a "perspective on the true value" of gold records, after seeing that Harrison had hidden away the Beatles' gold sales awards in a dining room cabinet.) In music journalist John Harris's view, "Beware of Darkness" offers "a glimpse of the toll the [Beatles'] break-up had taken on George's emotions".

== Lyrics and music ==
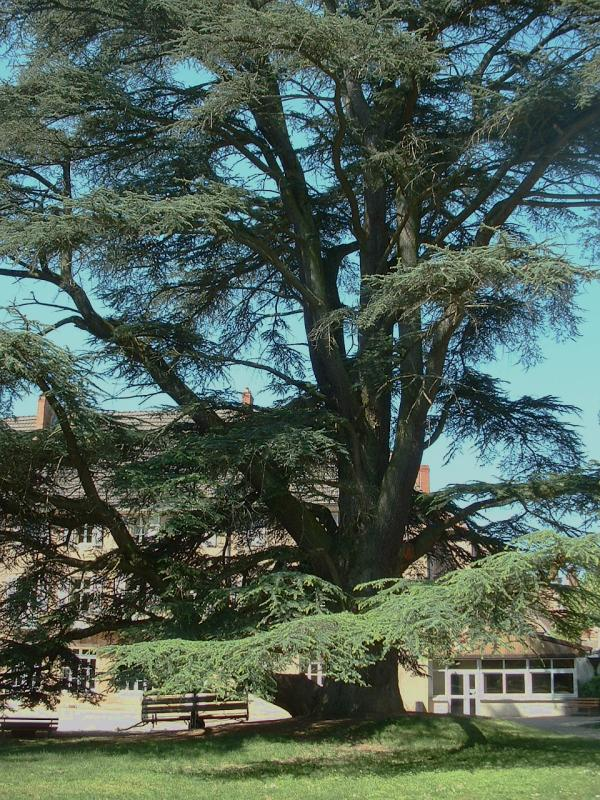
The song's lyrics encourage the listener to seek daylight and abundant growth in the manner of an Atlas cedar.

"Beware of Darkness" is a ballad containing dense imagery. The song marks a return to the spiritual concerns of Harrison's songs with the Beatles such as "Within You Without You". In addition to espousing spiritual concerns over material things, the lyrics warn the listener against various influences that may corrupt them. Among the potential corrupting influences are con men ("soft shoe shufflers"), politicians ("greedy leaders") and pop idols of little substance ("falling swingers"). In addition, the lyrics warn against negative thoughts ("thoughts that linger"), since these corrupting influences and negative thoughts can lead to maya, or illusion, which distracts people from the true purpose of life.

The middle eight delivers the message that surrendering to sad thoughts "can hurt you" and "is not what you are here for". In the final verse, Harrison states that an individual's purpose is not to follow political manipulation, but to grow unfettered in daylight, in the manner of "weeping Atlas cedars".

Author Simon Leng describes the melody of "Beware of Darkness" as "complex and highly original". The melody of the verses incorporates a pedal point on the key of G major and moves to G sharp minor, a progression Leng claims "should not work in harmonic terms", using as an analogy a count of "one, two, six", but comments that somehow the melody manages to work. Musicologist Wilfrid Mellers explains the effectiveness of this key shift as dramatising the "beware" in the lyrics. Similarly, Mellers states that harmonic movement from the key of C sharp minor to D major to C major "creates the 'aimless' wandering of 'each unconscious sufferer'" described in the lyrics. The nearly chromatic melody of the verses contrasts with a more standard rock melody in the middle eight. (Note: With regard to the composition's unorthodox qualities, Mellers adds: "Both verse and music are mysterious and beautiful, and they work; we do let go, as the music ultimately declines in triads of B, A and G, the last with a flat seventh, left unresolved.")

== Recording ==
Harrison recorded the basic track for "Beware of Darkness" between May and August 1970. The sessions for All Things Must Pass typically featured a large cast of musicians, in keeping with Spector's Wall of Sound approach, although the participants' varied recollections have made precise identification of each song's contributors open to conjecture. According to Leng and Beatles historian Bruce Spizer, the only musicians on the completed recording are Harrison, Eric Clapton and Dave Mason on guitars, Whitlock on piano, Gary Wright on organ, Carl Radle on bass guitar and Ringo Starr on drums. In addition, they credit the vibraphone part to either Alan White or John Barham. (Note: White has said he played drums on the song, which he describes as "really ... one of my favorite tracks", although he also said that with three drummers appearing on the album, "none of us can remember which tracks we play on!" In another interview, he listed six tracks he believed he played on, none of which was "Beware of Darkness".) According to Whitlock, Harrison and Clapton both played electric guitar; an acoustic guitar part is also present on the recording. (Note: In a 2014 interview, Mason said he could not remember which All Things Must Pass tracks he played on but that his contributions were confined to acoustic guitar.)

Spector wrote to Harrison in mid August with comments on the latter's initial mixes of the album's songs. Rhythm parts were played on acoustic guitar by members of the group Badfinger throughout the sessions.

Whitlock recalled that the main session for the song was the first time he played piano on a studio recording. He said that Harrison asked him to give the part a gospel feeling, which Whitlock achieved by drawing on his upbringing in a churchgoing family in the American South. Whitlock also recalled that, due to his lack of experience on the instrument, he played the piano keys too hard and broke one of the thick-gauge bass strings; however, he believed that the replacement string gave the piano a new resonance that benefited the recording.

Barham's orchestral arrangements were recorded during the next phase of the album's production, along with further contributions from Harrison, such as lead vocals, slide guitar parts and multi-tracked backing vocals. As with tracks such as "Isn't It a Pity" and "All Things Must Pass", Barham and Harrison collaborated on the string arrangement; Barham stayed at Friar Park and created the score from melodies that Harrison sang or played to him on piano or guitar. (Note: Barham also wrote the orchestral score for Harrison's production of "Govinda", the second single by the Radha Krishna Temple.) In his description of the released recording, author Elliot Huntley says that the track's musical tension escalates to "breaking point" with Harrison's mid-song slide guitar solo. Musicologist Thomas MacFarlane writes that, true to the song's lyrics, "the sounds of the track seem to emerge out of darkness/space." In this way, he continues, "Beware of Darkness" conveys the idea of "perpetual distortion itself as an inevitable aspect of the human experience".

== Release and reception ==
Apple Records released All Things Must Pass on 27 November 1970. "Beware of Darkness" was sequenced as the opening track on side three of the triple LP, followed by "Apple Scruffs", Harrison's tribute to the diehard Beatles fans he termed the Apple scruffs. Apple included a poster with the album, showing Harrison in a darkened corridor of Friar Park, standing in front of an iron-framed window. Tom Wilkes had designed a more adventurous poster but Harrison was uncomfortable with the imagery. Part of this original poster was a painting of a bathing scene featuring naked women (one of whom was blonde, representing Boyd) and a "mischievous" Krishna, who had hidden the bathers' clothing in the branches of a nearby tree. (Note: Some of the Barry Feinstein photos that Wilkes used in the discarded poster design appeared instead on the picture sleeves for the "My Sweet Lord" and "What Is Life" singles.)

Spizer writes of the message conveyed in the approved poster design: "[Harrison] is wearing a dark hat and is barely visible except for his face due to the darkness that dominates the photo. It is a powerful image of a serious man." Don Heckman of The New York Times said the poster depicted a "brooding Harrison" and predicted that the album would be "one of the major hits of this – and next – year".

In his contemporary review of All Things Must Pass, Ben Gerson of Rolling Stone wrote that "Beware of Darkness" was possibly the album's best song, commenting on its "enigmatic" music and the combination of "warning" and "affirmation" in its lyrics. Recalling the impact of All Things Must Pass in his 1977 book The Beatles Forever, Nicholas Schaffner said that whereas "[John] Lennon's studio was his soap-box" on the concurrently issued John Lennon/Plastic Ono Band, "Harrison's was his pulpit" through his album's focus on Hindu-aligned concepts such as maya, reincarnation, karma, chanting and transcendence. Schaffner paired "Beware of Darkness" with "All Things Must Pass" as "the two most eloquent songs on the album, musically as well as lyrically" with "mysterious, seductive melodies, over which faded strings ... hover like Blue Jay Way fog". (Note: MacFarlane writes that the "sense of clouds of sound floating through the space" in "Beware of Darkness" anticipates the sound of Lennon's 1971 album Imagine.) In a rare early-1970s interview, Harrison told Mike Hennessey that "Beware of Darkness" was his favourite out of all his compositions, adding, "I like the tune, I like the idea and I like the chord changes ..."

== Retrospective assessments and legacy ==
Writing for Goldmine magazine shortly after Harrison's death in November 2001, Dave Thompson said that "Beware of Darkness" and "Art of Dying" "rate among the finest compositions of Harrison's entire career". In his entry for All Things Must Pass in the book 1,000 Recordings to Hear Before You Die, Tom Moon names it as the first of the three "key tracks". He writes that almost every song "offers a different type of ecstasy" and in the case of "the meditative 'Beware of Darkness'", by "follow[ing] a halting, patient path toward illumination". In The Cambridge Companion to the Beatles, Michael Frontani describes it as Harrison's "supreme warning about maya", adding that his and Barham's attention to the orchestral arrangement on this and other songs was arguably more significant for the sound of All Things Must Pass than Spector's Wall of Sound aesthetic. Further to Harrison's standing as the most spiritually focused Beatle, Frontani continues, the message of the line "Beware of maya" "anchored his artistic and personal life for the next three decades". (Note: Having first collaborated with Harrison in 1967, Barham later said of working on All Things Must Pass: "I was surprised by the songs' originality, but not by their spiritual feeling. By this time, I was convinced that George was a genuine spiritual seeker, one of the very few that I have ever known.")

AllMusic critic Richie Unterberger similarly views "Beware of Darkness" as one of the highlights of All Things Must Pass, while authors Chip Madinger and Mark Easter call it a "stunning composition" that demonstrates the considerable growth in Harrison's songwriting since 1965. Nick DeRiso of the music website Something Else! describes it as "Harrison's best album's very best song – one where he perfectly matches a lyrical meditation on overcoming life's harder moments … with the sound, mysticism and fury of one of the early 1970s' greatest amalgamations of sidemen". Writing for Mojo in 2011, John Harris deemed it and "Isn't It a Pity" "simply jaw-dropping" ballads.

In his appreciation of Harrison for PopMatters, Christopher Guerin, the former president of the Fort Wayne Philharmonic Orchestra, admires the "beautiful melodic structures" and heartfelt spirituality of songs such as "Beware of Darkness", adding that Harrison sings the lyrics "not as a preacher, but as an older brother". GQ's George Chesterton also rates the song "among Harrison's best", writing:

Again, sung in the second person and full of pointed advice, it swishes around with new-found confidence and has some of his most elegant, yearning chord progressions as well as some of his best slide guitar playing. To outsiders there is an opaque, unknowable quality to Harrison and no amount of interviews or lyrical analysis can clear away the fog. You get the feeling that was intentional.

In Uncut magazine's August 2008 feature article on Harrison, Neil Innes commented on the difference between Harrison's songs and those of Lennon and Paul McCartney: "His stuff didn't always grab you the way the other two's did. But if you listen to something like 'Beware of Darkness' – the chords in that – I mean, he's up there with Brian Wilson ... up there with Debussy." American rock band Beware of Darkness took their name from the song. Having first met Harrison early in the sessions for All Things Must Pass, Gary Wright soon followed him on a path dedicated to Hindu-aligned spirituality. In his 2014 autobiography, Wright says he was already impressed with "Within You Without You", but songs such as "Beware of Darkness" "had spiritual messages, something I had not heard before in pop music – especially to the degree that he used them. He was breaking new ground as an artist to an even greater degree than he had done in the past [with the Beatles]."

In July 2016, the Harrison family referenced the song in response to the Beatles' "Here Comes the Sun" being appropriated by Donald Trump's presidential campaign at the Republican National Convention. The family complained that this use of Harrison's work was unauthorised and "offensive", and later tweeted: "If it had been Beware of Darkness, then we MAY have approved it! #TrumpYourself."

In 2021, the song was featured prominently in Season 2 Episode 8 ("Man City") of sports comedy-drama Ted Lasso.

In 2025, the song was used in the opening scene of Zach Cregger's horror blockbuster Weapons.

== Other Harrison performances ==
=== Concert for Bangladesh ===
"Beware of Darkness" was one of the songs Harrison played at the Concert for Bangladesh at Madison Square Garden on 1 August 1971. Harrison sang the lead vocals for the first two verses, and then Leon Russell took over the lead for the third verse. Leng describes the vocal combination as "Scouse tremolo" followed by "mad-dog Southern growl", and an indication of Harrison's willingness to share the spotlight with other artists. (Note: Less impressed with Russell's contribution, author Ian Inglis says that his singing "lacks the personal sincerity demanded by the lyrics". Elliot Huntley dismisses it as a "totally unwelcome redneck hillbilly drawl", despite Rolling Stone's reviewer having deemed the duet "a performance of almost stately proportions".)

The song was played at both the afternoon and evening performances, with Clapton and Starr again among the group of backing musicians. In his 1972 interview with Hennessey, Harrison recalled that due to the unusual chord changes, some of the musicians "just couldn't figure it out, but later it made sense to them". (Note: He cited this as an example of how "Some things in music one person will do quite naturally, while another will find them totally confusing. It's funny.") The evening performance of the song was included on the Concert for Bangladesh live album and in the film of the concert. In his album review for The Guardian, Geoffrey Cannon cited "Beware of Darkness" when commenting that, given the picture of a starving child refugee on the LP cover, some of the album's lyrics could be heard in a topical light. He highlighted Harrison's warning "Watch out now, take care, beware of greedy leaders" as a follow-up to statements in the preceding tracks – namely "Open up your heart and come together" in Starr's "It Don't Come Easy" and, before that, "I hope you get this message" in Billy Preston's "That's the Way God Planned It".

=== Beware of ABKCO! version ===
A solo acoustic version of "Beware of Darkness", which Harrison recorded at Abbey Road on 27 May 1970, was included on the 1990s bootleg album Beware of ABKCO! The lyrics were incomplete at this time, as Harrison acknowledges at the start of the song. The performance was part of Harrison's run-through of his stockpile of songs for Spector, for possible inclusion on All Things Must Pass.

The bootleg's title was taken from a line in Harrison's performance of "Beware of Darkness", when he substitutes the reference to maya with the line "Beware of ABKCO". The latter refers to ABKCO Industries, the company owned by Allen Klein that Harrison, Lennon and Starr had authorised to manage Apple. This solo performance was officially released as a bonus track on the 2001 remaster of All Things Must Pass.

== Cover versions ==
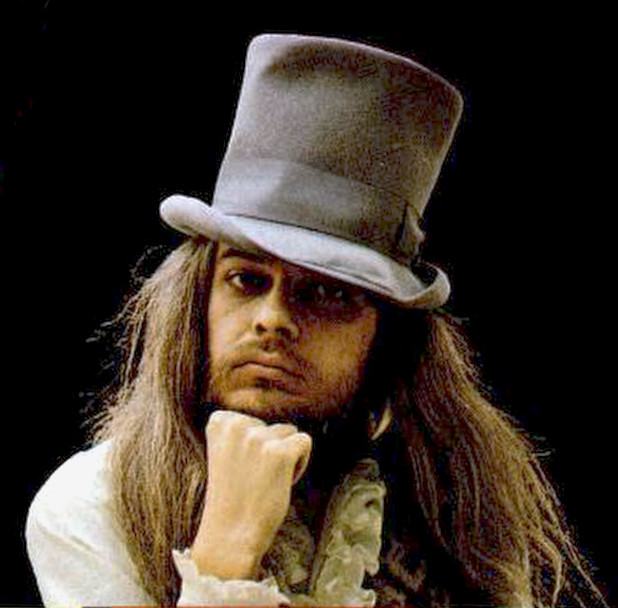
Leon Russell covered the song in 1971 and performed it with Harrison at the Concert for Bangladesh.

Leon Russell recorded a version of "Beware of Darkness" on his 1971 album Leon Russell and the Shelter People. Critic Toby Creswell considers "Beware of Darkness" to be the highlight of the album, regarding this as the "definitive" version of the song, noting that Russell "brings chiaroscuro to this song about Eastern mysticism". The song was also included on several of Russell's compilation albums, including Gimme Shelter!: The Best of Leon Russell and The Best of Leon Russell.

Marianne Faithfull included the song on her album Rich Kid Blues, which - though recorded in 1971 - was released in 1984 and also on her 2000 compilation album It's All Over Now Baby Blue. The bands Concrete Blonde and Spock's Beard are among the other artists who have recorded "Beware of Darkness". Spock's Beard used it as the title track of their 1996 album Beware of Darkness, basing their version on Leon Russell's arrangement. In AllMusic critic Thom Jurek's description, the band employ "a full-blown choir, thundering guitars, and Neal Morse's growling vocal to create another valid and moving version of the tune".

Eric Clapton performed "Beware of Darkness" at the George Harrison tribute concert Concert for George in 2002. Author Ian Inglis states that Clapton's performance "captures the thoughtful intent of the original".

Joe Cocker covered "Beware of Darkness" for his 2007 album Hymn for My Soul.

Matthew Sweet and Susanna Hoffs covered "Beware of Darkness" on their 2009 album Under the Covers, Vol. 2.

Sheryl Crow recorded a cover of the song for her 2019 album Threads. Crow's version also features Clapton, Sting and Brandi Carlile. In May 2020, she performed the track solo on piano during a remote appearance for the TV show Late Show with Stephen Colbert. Crow introduced the song by saying that Harrison was "one of my favorite artists of all time".

== Personnel ==
The following musicians are believed to have played on Harrison's original version of "Beware of Darkness":

- George Harrison – vocals, electric guitar, slide guitars
- Eric Clapton – lead guitar
- Dave Mason – acoustic guitar
- Bobby Whitlock – piano
- Gary Wright – organ
- Carl Radle – bass guitar
- Klaus Voormann – 6 String Bass
- Ringo Starr – drums
- John Barham – string arrangement
- uncredited – vibraphone
