= Early 21st Century Blues =

Studio album by Cowboy Junkies
- Released: August 16, 2005
- Recorded: February, March 2005
- Genre: Alternative country
- Length: 59:22
- Label: Latent, Zoë, Cooking Vinyl
- Producer: Michael Timmins

Cowboy Junkies chronology
One Soul Now (2004)	Early 21st Century Blues (2005)	Long Journey Home (2006)

Professional ratings
Review scores
Source	Rating
AllMusic	3/5 stars
Encyclopedia of Popular Music	3/5 stars
Pitchfork	5.7/10

Early 21st Century Blues is an album by the Canadian alt-country band Cowboy Junkies, released in 2005. The album features two original songs and covers of material by Bruce Springsteen, Bob Dylan, John Lennon, George Harrison and Richie Havens. The record has a very strong anti-war message, while also protesting public apathy towards the political process.

== Album development ==
After being off the road for a few months, by February 2005, the Junkies decided it was time to get together and record some music. They invited the Timmins' older brother, John Timmins, to bring his guitar and sit in. The theme the band decided on was to be on war, violence, fear, greed, ignorance, or loss, and everybody had to bring two or three songs written by other people. The Junkies played and interpreted the works of others and recorded their sessions, over the course of five days. The album was recorded at the Cowboy Junkies recording studio, The Clubhouse, during February and March 2005. The genesis of the album were a pair of songs that the Junkies had taken to their heart, "Isn't It a Pity" by George Harrison which they started performing on the Long Journey Home Tour the previous year, and "December Skies" which was written and recorded in October 2002 during the One Soul Now sessions and inspired by The Wars by Timothy Findley. The other original song on the album, "This World Dreams Of" was also written during the One Soul Now session, but they never got a recording they liked. For this recording, they slowed down the song, spacing it out and letting it breathe. One line from the song, "more things are wrought by prayer than this world dreams of", is from a Tennyson poem called "The Passing of Arthur", which inspired the writing of the song. The song "I Don't Want to Be a Soldier" is unusual for the Junkies because it has a rap break in the song. The band was jamming on the song, and they set up a drum loop. When they listened to their session, they realized there was a hip-hop motion to the loop, so they invited a friend of theirs, Kevin Bond, also known as Rebel, to improvise and record a rap element, using the album themes as a basis. The Junkies then asked Jeff Wolpert to mix the elements together.

== Track listing ==
No.	Title	Writer(s)	Length
1.	"License to Kill"	Bob Dylan	4:47
2.	"Two Soldiers"	Traditional; arranged by Cowboy Junkies	4:02
3.	"December Skies"	Michael Timmins	5:18
4.	"This World Dreams Of"	Michael Timmins	5:08
5.	"Brothers Under the Bridge"	Bruce Springsteen	3:59
6.	"You're Missing"	Springsteen	4:09
7.	"Handouts in the Rain"	Richie Havens	8:26
8.	"Isn't It a Pity"	George Harrison	5:51
9.	"No More"	Traditional; arranged by Cowboy Junkies	5:01
10.	"I Don't Want to Be a Soldier" (featuring Rebel)	John Lennon	7:30
11.	"One"	U2	5:11
Total length:			59:22

== Personnel ==
Cowboy Junkies

- Margo Timmins – vocals
- Michael Timmins – guitar
- Alan Anton – bass
- Peter Timmins – drums

Additional musicians

- John Timmins – guitar, banjo
- Jeff Bird – electric mandolin
- Jaro Czwewinec – accordion
- Kevin "Rebel" Bond – vocal and lyrics (track 10)
- Bob Egan – pedal steel guitar
- Anne Bourne – cello

Production

- Michael Timmins – producer, engineer, mixed by (tracks 1, 2, 6, 7, 9 & 11)
- Peter Moore – mastering at the E Room
- Jeff Wolpert – mixed by (tracks 3–5, 8 & 10)
- Howells and Dinnick – art direction
- Xiu B Doo – cover painting
