= All Things Must Pass (song) =

1970 song by George Harrison

- Cover of the original Hansen Publishing sheet music for the song

Song by George Harrison

from the album All Things Must Pass
- Written: 1968
- Released: 27 November 1970
- Genre: Folk rock
- Length: 3:47
- Label: Apple
- Songwriter: George Harrison
- Producers: George Harrison, Phil Spector

"All Things Must Pass" is a song written by English rock musician George Harrison. Harrison wrote the song in 1968 and introduced it to the Beatles during the "Get Back" sessions in January 1969. After not being included on Let It Be (1970), Billy Preston recorded and released the song as "All Things (Must) Pass" – on his Apple Records album Encouraging Words (1970). Harrison then recorded a version for his debut solo album All Things Must Pass, released in November 1970. The composition of Harrison's version reflects the influence of the Band's sound and communal music-making on Harrison, after he had spent time with the group in Woodstock, New York, in late 1968. In his lyrics, Harrison drew inspiration from Timothy Leary's poem "All Things Pass", a psychedelic adaptation of the Tao Te Ching.

The subject matter deals with the transient nature of human existence, and in Harrison's All Things Must Pass reading, words and music combine to reflect impressions of optimism against fatalism. On release, together with Barry Feinstein's album cover image, commentators viewed the song as a statement on the Beatles' break-up. Widely regarded as one of Harrison's finest compositions, its passing on by his former band has provoked comment from biographers and reviewers. Music critic Ian MacDonald described "All Things Must Pass" as "the wisest song never recorded by the Beatles", while author Simon Leng considers it "perhaps the greatest solo Beatle composition". The recording was co-produced by Phil Spector in London; it features an orchestral arrangement by John Barham and contributions from musicians such as Ringo Starr, Pete Drake, Bobby Whitlock, Eric Clapton and Klaus Voormann.

Although the Beatles did not formally record the song, a 1969 solo demo by Harrison appears on their compilation Anthology 3 (1996) and the Beatles as a band undertook over 70 takes of the track. An early version from the All Things Must Pass sessions was released on Harrison's posthumous compilation Early Takes: Volume 1 in 2012. Paul McCartney performed "All Things Must Pass" at the Concert for George tribute in November 2002, a year after Harrison's death. Jim James, the Waterboys, Klaus Voormann and Yusuf Islam, and Sloan Wainwright are among the other artists who have covered the song.

== Background ==
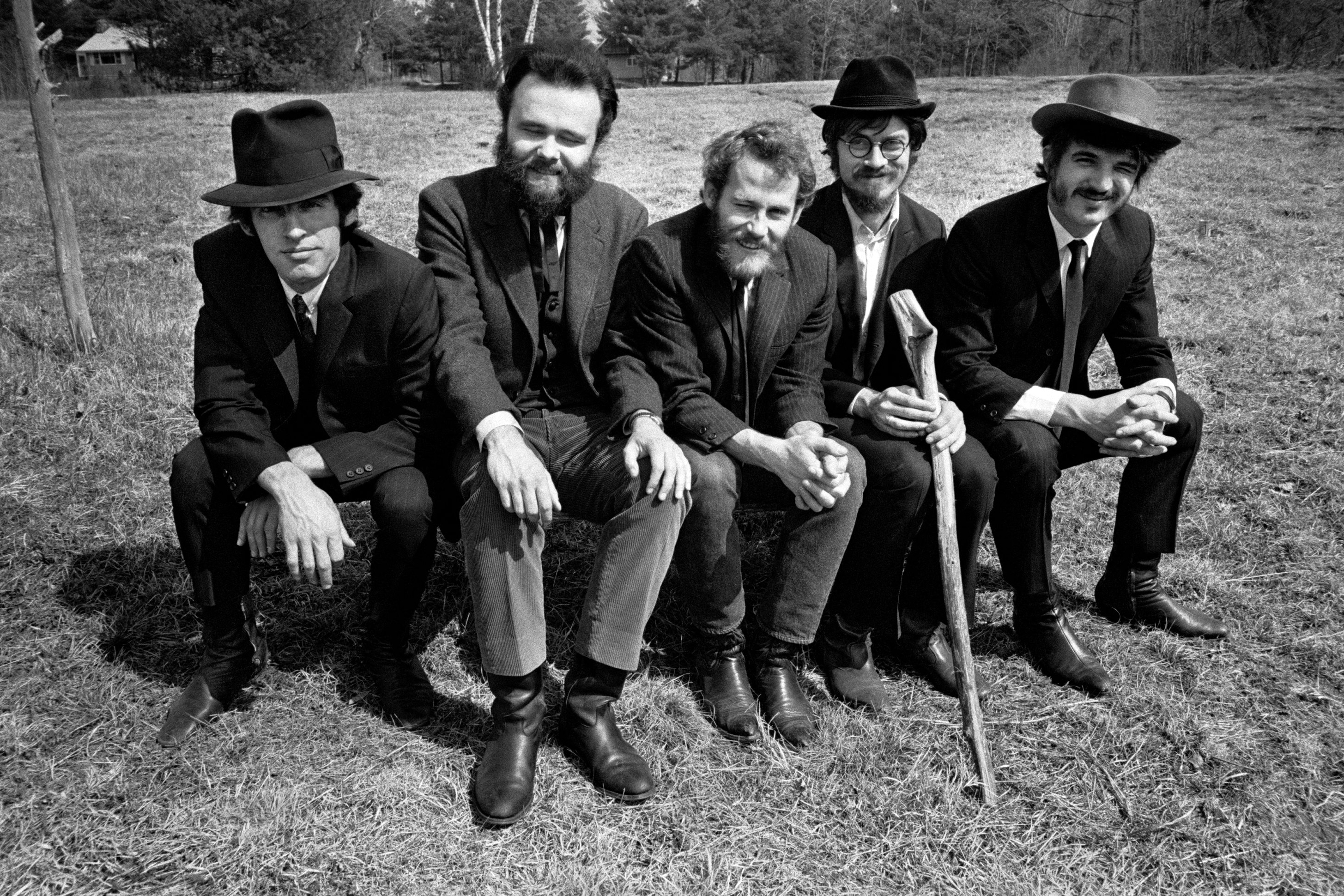
The Band in Woodstock in 1969, with Levon Helm (centre) and Robbie Robertson (second from right)

Like his friend Eric Clapton, George Harrison was inspired by Music from Big Pink, the seminal debut album from the Band, the former backing group for Bob Dylan. Released in July 1968, Music from Big Pink was partly responsible for Harrison's return to the guitar, his first instrument, after he had spent two years attempting to master the more complex Indian sitar. Harrison duly shared his enthusiasm with the British music press, declaring Big Pink "the new sound to come from America", drummer Levon Helm later recalled, thus helping to establish the Band internationally. In appreciation, Robbie Robertson, the Band's guitarist, extended an invitation to Harrison to stop by in Woodstock, New York, when the opportunity arose.

I respected the Band enormously. All the different guys in the group sang, and Robbie Robertson used to say he was lucky, because he could write songs for a voice like Levon [Helm]'s. What a wise and generous attitude.

— George Harrison to Musician magazine, 1987

Late in 1968, after producing sessions in Los Angeles for a solo album by Apple Records signing Jackie Lomax, Harrison spent Thanksgiving and much of December in upstate New York, where he renewed his friendship with a now semi-retired Dylan and took part in informal jam sessions with the Band. According to Helm, they discussed making a possible "fireside jam" album with Clapton and an Apple Films "rock western" called Zachariah, but neither project progressed beyond the planning stage. The bucolic surroundings proved fruitful for Harrison as a songwriter, producing his first collaboration with Dylan, "I'd Have You Anytime", and leading him to write "All Things Must Pass". He later described the latter song as a "Robbie Robertson–Band type of tune", and said that he always imagined it being sung by Helm.

== Composition ==
While discussing "All Things Must Pass" with music journalist Timothy White in 1987, Harrison recalled that his "starting point" for the composition was Robertson's "The Weight" – a song that had "a religious and a country feeling to it". Musically, the verses of "All Things Must Pass" are set to a logical climb within the key of E; the brief choruses form a departure from this, with their inclusion of a B minor chord rather than the more expected major voicing. Author Ian Inglis notes that the composition incorporates the same "modes, cadences and suspensions" found in Band songs such as "The Weight" and "The Night They Drove Old Dixie Down".

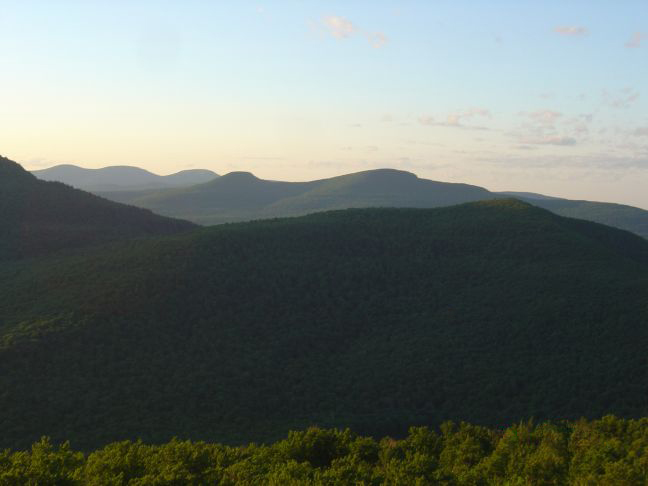
The Catskill Mountains in upstate New York – surroundings that inspired the music of the Band, and Harrison's song "All Things Must Pass"

For his lyrics, Harrison drew inspiration from "All Things Pass", a poem published in Timothy Leary's 1966 book Psychedelic Prayers after the Tao Te Ching. (Note: Harrison had already adapted a passage from the Tao Te Ching, a Chinese classic text, in his 1968 B-side for the Beatles, "The Inner Light". This had come at the suggestion of Cambridge academic Juan Mascaró, who had been moved by Harrison's lyrics to another of his Indian-inspired compositions, "Within You Without You".) In his 1980 autobiography, I Me Mine, Harrison refers to the idea for the song originating from "all kinds of mystics and ex-mystics", including Leary. Like later Harrison compositions such as "Here Comes the Sun", "So Sad" and "Blow Away", the lyrical and emotional content is based around metaphors involving the weather and the cycle of nature. Harrison states in the opening lines of verse one: "Sunrise doesn't last all morning / A cloudburst doesn't last all day".

According to Harrison biographer Simon Leng, the lyrics reflect "life's ephemeral character" and the "transitory" nature of love. Inglis suggests that the song is "[o]stensibly" about "the end of a love affair". He and theologian Dale Allison note the optimism offered in Harrison's words, since, as Leng puts it, "a new day always dawns." Although "All Things Must Pass" avoids religiosity, Allison writes that its statement on the "all-inclusive" transience of things in the material world explains why so much of its 1970 parent album, All Things Must Pass, "finds hope and meaning only in God, who does not pass away". The song's main message is offered in its middle eight:

All things must pass
None of life's strings can last
So I must be on my way
And face another day.

Ultimately, the cycle of nature offers "consolation", Leng writes, as further evidenced in the verse-three lines "Now the darkness only stays at night time" and "Daylight is good at arriving at the right time".

The lyrics underwent minor changes after Harrison presented the song to the Beatles in January 1969, when they began working at London's Twickenham Film Studios for the so-called Get Back project (released as the Let It Be album and film). He had initially written the second line of verse two as "A wind can blow those clouds away", but John Lennon suggested the word "mind" to introduce a bit of "psychedelia" into the song, after a misinterpretation of Mal Evans' handwriting. Similarly, the repeated line "It's not always gonna be this grey" was originally "It's not always been this grey" in verses one and two.

== Pre-All Things Must Pass recording history ==
=== The Beatles' Get Back rehearsals ===
In contrast with the creative equality he enjoyed with Dylan and the Band in Woodstock, Harrison returned to the Beatles to find the same discordant atmosphere that had blighted the White Album sessions in 1968. Early on during the Get Back rehearsals – and tellingly, music journalist John Harris comments, before the arrival that day of Lennon and his partner Yoko Ono – Harrison enthused to Ringo Starr and Paul McCartney about the Band's camaraderie and group ethos, saying: "They're just living, and they happen to be a band as well."

I got back to England for Christmas and then ... we were to start on the thing which turned into Let It Be. And straight away, again, it was just weird vibes. You know, I found I was starting to be able to enjoy being a musician, but the moment I got back with the Beatles it was just too difficult.

— Harrison to Crawdaddy, 1977

On 2 January, day one of the Twickenham film shoot, Harrison introduced "All Things Must Pass", and the band worked on the song intermittently over the next four days of filming. In the search for a suitable musical arrangement, Harrison stressed his preference for a "feel" akin to the Band, a suggestion that resulted in Lennon switching from guitar to Lowrey organ, a keyboard favoured by the Band's Garth Hudson. During the Twickenham rehearsals, the Beatles also discussed the idea of Harrison performing "All Things Must Pass" solo for inclusion in the proposed film.

They returned to the song briefly towards the end of January, by which time the project had moved location to their own Apple Studio, in central London – one of Harrison's conditions for rejoining the Beatles after his temporary walkout on 10 January. Although the band gave a fair amount of time to "All Things Must Pass", it was ultimately put aside, just as other Harrison compositions including "Old Brown Shoe", "Isn't It a Pity", "Let It Down" and "I Me Mine" received a lukewarm reception, particularly from Lennon. David Fricke of Rolling Stone has referred to this period as a "struggle" for Harrison "against the patronizing restrictions of writing within and for the Beatles". Doug Sulpy and Ray Schweighardt, authors of Get Back: The Unauthorized Chronicle of The Beatles' Let It Be Disaster, observe that Lennon and McCartney routinely rejected Harrison's songs, "even though some were far better than their own".

The Beatles never formally recorded "All Things Must Pass", and only rehearsal takes circulate on bootleg compilations from the sessions. The Fly on the Wall bonus disc accompanying the McCartney-instigated Let It Be... Naked album (2003) includes a snippet of the Beatles indulging in some Band-like chorusing on the song.

=== Harrison's solo demo ===
"All Things Must Pass"

Song by the Beatles

from the album Anthology 3
- Released: 28 October 1996
- Recorded: 25 February 1969
- Studio: EMI, London
- Genre: Folk rock
- Length: 3:05
- Label: Apple
- Songwriter: George Harrison
- Producer: George Harrison

During the Beatles' Apple Studio session on 28 January, Harrison talked with Lennon and Ono about possibly doing a solo album of his unused songs, in order to "preserve this, the Beatle bit, more". Lennon offered his support for the idea. While author Bruce Spizer has suggested that Lennon was keen to "spare" the band from having to work on Harrison's songs, Sulpy and Schweighardt consider that Lennon's enthusiasm was because such a solo project would allow him and Ono to continue their own recording activities "without causing friction within The Beatles". (Note: By this point, Harrison had already released the largely instrumental soundtrack album Wonderwall Music, which was soon followed by Lennon and Ono's experimental work Two Virgins.)

On 25 February 1969, his 26th birthday, Harrison entered Abbey Road Studios alone and recorded a demo of the song, along with other recent compositions "Old Brown Shoe" and "Something". With Ken Scott serving as engineer, he recorded two takes of "All Things Must Pass", adding extra electric guitar onto the second. This version was eventually released in 1996 on the Beatles' outtake collection Anthology 3.

=== Billy Preston's version ===
"All Things (Must) Pass"

Song by Billy Preston

from the album Encouraging Words
- Released: 11 September 1970 (UK); 9 November 1970 (US)
- Genre: Soul
- Length: 3:38
- Label: Apple
- Songwriter: George Harrison
- Producers: George Harrison, Billy Preston

Soon after Harrison had begun talking publicly about making a solo album, during the final months of 1969, he offered "All Things Must Pass", along with the more recent "My Sweet Lord", to Billy Preston for the latter's album Encouraging Words. Through Harrison's invitation, Preston had played keyboards for the Beatles once the Get Back/Let It Be sessions resumed at Apple Studio, where the 22-year-old Texan had impressed with his superior musicianship and convivial presence. Preston was soon offered a recording deal with Apple Records, Encouraging Words being the second album under the contract.

Co-produced by Harrison, Preston's reading of "All Things Must Pass" betrays an obvious debt to his former mentor, Ray Charles. While Harrison's later recording is generally viewed as the definitive version, Bruce Eder of AllMusic considers this treatment of the song the superior of the two. Preston's version appeared in September 1970, five months after the Beatles' break-up.

== All Things Must Pass recording ==
While completing his production on Preston's release, Harrison chose to record the song himself for what became the title track of his post-Beatles solo debut, the triple album All Things Must Pass. In describing "All Things Must Pass" as a "haunting hymn about the mortality of everything", author Elliot Huntley notes the added poignance in Harrison's version, due to the death of his mother in July 1970 after a long period of illness.

With Phil Spector as his co-producer, Harrison taped the basic track at Abbey Road Studios between 26 May and early in June. Other participants included Clapton, German bassist Klaus Voormann and Starr, the latter another avowed Band fan. Leng credits the song's piano part to Bobby Whitlock, who also sang backing vocals with Clapton, his future bandmate in Derek and the Dominos. In his 2010 autobiography, Whitlock states that it was Preston who played the piano on "All Things Must Pass", while his own contribution was pump organ, or harmonium. (Note: Alternatively, Harrison said in 1971 that American musician Gary Wright had "played piano on the whole [All Things Must Pass] album". Leng concedes the difficulty in ascertaining precise musicians' credits for each track and names Wright and Whitlock as the two "core" keyboard players on the sessions.) Although Leng lists both Harrison and Clapton as having played acoustic guitar and Starr and Jim Gordon on drums, according to the personnel that Whitlock offers, neither Clapton nor Gordon played on the song. Among the overdubs on the track, Nashville session musician Pete Drake recorded a pedal-steel guitar part during a brief visit to London, to participate in sessions for Harrison songs such as "Behind That Locked Door" and "I Live for You". (Note: Whitlock recalls that originally he had whistled a melody, which Spector recorded onto the basic track, and that this served as a guide for Drake's contribution.)

I'd play it to them and they'd say, "Wow, yeah! Great song!" And I'd say, "Really? Do you really like it?" I realised that it was okay ...

— Harrison discussing the reception his compositions received during the album sessions

Spector's erratic behaviour during the All Things Must Pass sessions left Harrison to handle most of the project alone, but in August 1970, after receiving a tape of Harrison's early mixes of the songs, Spector provided him with written feedback and guidance. Spector wrote of "All Things Must Pass", "This particular song is so good that any honest [vocal] performance by you is acceptable as far as I'm concerned", but he expressed his disapproval of the horns at the start of the track. In the words of authors Chip Madinger and Mark Easter, "clearer heads prevailed" and Jim Price and Bobby Keys' horn parts were retained.

The recording opens with "unvaryingly steady" piano chords, Inglis writes, and what Leng terms "sensitive" string orchestration from John Barham, soon joined by the horns and Drake's pedal steel. Leng highlights this combination as providing the song with its rising and falling musical moods, implying variously light and darkness; Inglis writes of the musical arrangement mirroring the "competing impressions" of hope and melancholy found in Harrison's lyrics. True to its Catskill roots, the recording evokes the Band's "The Weight" and their eponymous second album, the tracks on which were similarly inspired by "the beauty of that autumn in Woodstock", according to Helm. (Note: Leng identifies the Band's minimalist tradition as a significant influence on other All Things Must Pass songs, particularly "Run of the Mill" and "Behind That Locked Door".)

== Release and album artwork ==
The song's title and message provided inspiration for Barry Feinstein's cover photo for All Things Must Pass

Almost two years after Harrison wrote the song, "All Things Must Pass" was released in November 1970, closing side three of the triple album in its original LP format. Despite its high retail price, All Things Must Pass was a major commercial success, comfortably outselling concurrent solo releases by Lennon and McCartney. (Note: As of 2011, it remained the most successful album by any of the former Beatles.)

The song's title was invariably seen as a statement on the demise of the Beatles, as commentators viewed the album as Harrison's liberation from the artistic constraints imposed on him within the band. The album's cover image, showing Harrison seated on his Friar Park lawn surrounded by four reclining garden gnomes – thought to represent the Beatles – was also viewed as reflecting this theme. While commenting that "All Things Must Pass" had "accrue[d] new layers of relevance" during the album's creation, particularly with the death of Harrison's mother, former Mojo editor Paul Du Noyer writes: "Nobody in November 1970 could have mistaken the title's significance ... As if to cement the association of ideas, the wry cover picture has George in solitary splendour, surrounded by a quartet of gnomes." In a 2001 interview, photographer Barry Feinstein admitted that the words "All Things Must Pass" had helped inspire his set-up for the photo, saying: "What else could it be? ... [It] was over with The Beatles, right? And that title ... Very symbolic."

== Reception and legacy ==
On release, Ben Gerson of Rolling Stone described "All Things Must Pass" as "eloquently hopeful and resigned" while labelling the album "the music of mountain tops and vast horizons". Beatles Forever author Nicholas Schaffner noted in 1977, with reference to Harrison's commercial and critical dominance over his former bandmates following the break-up: "The very fact that the Beatles had kept George's flowering talents so under wraps proved to be his secret weapon." Schaffner named "All Things Must Pass" and "Beware of Darkness" as the two "most eloquent" songs on All Things Must Pass, "musically as well as lyrically", with "mysterious, seductive melodies, over which faded strings and horns hover like Blue Jay Way fog".

Writing for Rolling Stone in 2000, Anthony DeCurtis praised the song for its musical demonstration of "the sweet satisfactions of faith". On a triple album where "nearly every song is excellent", AllMusic picks "All Things Must Pass" as one of five standout tracks (or AMG track picks), with Richie Unterberger writing of its autumnal theme: "It's the kind of song that fits the mood in November, when the trees are getting stripped bare of their leaves, the days are getting shorter and colder, and you have to resign yourself to knowing it's going to be tougher and tougher in those regards for months, also knowing that those hardships will pass away come springtime." In his book on Harrison, subtitled A Spiritual Biography, Gary Tillery refers to the song as "magisterial" and a "majestic title track" that "leaves even the shallowest listener contemplative". Michael Gallucci of Ultimate Classic Rock places "All Things Must Pass" third on his list of Harrison's best solo songs (behind the two hit singles from All Things Must Pass, "My Sweet Lord" and "What Is Life"), and comments: "The album's title track takes on more poignancy after Harrison's death [in 2001], but it's always been great." Writing for Rough Guides, Chris Ingham similarly describes the song as "a heart-rending piece of significant prescience which seems to take on more poignancy with every passing year".

Among Harrison's biographers, Simon Leng considers "All Things Must Pass" a "classic of Harrison's lyrical ambiguity, in essence a hopeful song, without sounding so", with a lyric that "approaches Bob Dylan standard". Ian Inglis also praises the lyrics, writing: "The song contains some of Harrison's most insightful and pensive words. 'Daylight is good at arriving at the right time' is a fine example of his ... ability to position the profound within the commonplace." Elliot Huntley rates it as one of Harrison's "most beautiful" songs, "if not the very best", and suggests that the sentiments behind "All Things Must Pass" would have made it a "fitting conclusion" to the final album recorded by the Beatles, Abbey Road (1969).

Bruce Spizer similarly rates "All Things Must Pass" a highlight of Harrison's career, while Leng considers it "perhaps the greatest solo Beatle composition" of all. In his book Revolution in the Head, Ian MacDonald describes "All Things Must Pass" as "the wisest song never recorded by The Beatles". In 2009, The Guardian included the track in its list of "1000 Songs Everyone Must Hear".

== Performance and later releases ==
"All Things Must Pass" was not a track that Harrison ever played in concert, although it appeared on his preliminary setlist for the 1971 Concert for Bangladesh shows. He twice performed the song live in front of TV cameras during the final years of his life, beginning with his appearance with Ravi Shankar on VH1's Hard Rock Live, filmed in New York on 14 May 1997. The pair were on the show to promote their recent collaboration, Chants of India, but at host John Fugelsang's urging, Harrison accepted an acoustic guitar and performed a brief rendition of "All Things Must Pass". (Note: Although 150 minutes of Harrison and Shankar's appearance was filmed, VH1 originally aired only 22 minutes of footage, on 24 July, as George & Ravi – Yin & Yang. Omitted from the broadcast but also performed by Harrison was the Traveling Wilburys tune "If You Belonged to Me" and "Any Road", a track subsequently released on his posthumous album Brainwashed (2002).) In late 2000, Harrison sang "All Things Must Pass" while again seated on a stool on Friar Park's main lawn, a performance that was included in the press kit for All Things Must Pass's 30th anniversary reissue early the following year. (Note: On the day after Harrison's death was publicly announced, the quirky, Terry Gilliam-inspired graphics on Harrison's website, allthingsmustpass.com, were changed to show just a single gnome and the lyrics to "All Things Must Pass".)

Coinciding with this 2001 reissue, the song appeared on a promotional single as the B-side to "My Sweet Lord (2000)". After being omitted from the "cursory" selection of 1970–75 tracks on The Best of George Harrison (1976), Inglis writes, the song appeared on Harrison's 2009 career-spanning compilation Let It Roll.

In Martin Scorsese's 2011 documentary George Harrison: Living in the Material World, "All Things Must Pass" is the first song featured in the film, played over footage of German air raids over Britain during World War II. In November that year, a 1970-recorded demo of the song (featuring just Harrison, Starr and Voormann) appeared on the deluxe edition CD accompanying the British DVD release of the film; this CD was subsequently issued worldwide in May 2012 as Early Takes: Volume 1.

On 27 November 2020, the Harrison family released a stereo remix of the All Things Must Pass recording to mark the album's 50th anniversary.

== Cover versions ==
Steve Wood and Daniel May composed music to the 1998 documentary film Everest incorporating melodies from some of George Harrison's songs, one of which was "All Things Must Pass".

At the Concert for George tribute to Harrison, held at London's Royal Albert Hall on 29 November 2002, Paul McCartney sang "All Things Must Pass", backed by a large band that included Preston, Clapton, Voormann and Starr. In his organisation of the tribute concert, Clapton said he approached "All Things Must Pass" as the "key song of the whole event". Leng comments on the irony in McCartney performing the song, while Beatles biographer Peter Doggett writes: "it wasn't hard to imagine Harrison's cynicism as McCartney led the band into a soulful rendition of 'All Things Must Pass' – one of the songs that the other Beatles had refused to take seriously in January 1969." According to Clapton, author Robert Rodriguez writes, McCartney "was humbled at having to relearn it".

Several other artists have recorded "All Things Must Pass" in the years since Harrison's death. In 2003, Bobby Whitlock and his wife, CoCo Carmel, included the song on their acoustic live album Other Assorted Love Songs, Live from Whitney Chapel. Jazz guitarist Joel Harrison covered "All Things Must Pass" on his album Harrison on Harrison: Jazz Explanations of George Harrison, released in October 2005. In 2007, a live version by the Waterboys appeared on their CD single "Everybody Takes a Tumble", and the following year Sloan Wainwright included a cover of the song on her album Rediscovery.

"All Things Must Pass" was among the Harrison compositions covered by Jim James on his Tribute To EP, recorded in December 2001 but not released until August 2009. Also in 2009, Klaus Voormann released a version of the song on his solo album A Sideman's Journey, with Yusuf Islam on vocals and acoustic guitar.

== Personnel ==
The musicians who performed on Harrison's All Things Must Pass version of the song are believed to be as follows:

- George Harrison – vocals, acoustic guitar, slide guitar, backing vocals
- Eric Clapton – acoustic guitar, backing vocals
- Pete Drake – pedal steel
- Billy Preston – piano
- Bobby Whitlock – harmonium, backing vocals
- Klaus Voormann – bass
- Ringo Starr – drums, tambourine
- Jim Gordon – drums
- Bobby Keys – saxophone
- Jim Price – trumpet, trombone, horn arrangement
- John Barham – string arrangement

== Sources ==
- Dale C. Allison Jr, The Love There That's Sleeping: The Art and Spirituality of George Harrison, Continuum (New York, NY, 2006; ISBN 978-0-8264-1917-0).
- Keith Badman, The Beatles Diary Volume 2: After the Break-Up 1970–2001, Omnibus Press (London, 2001; ISBN 0-7119-8307-0).
- Harry Castleman & Walter J. Podrazik, All Together Now: The First Complete Beatles Discography 1961–1975, Ballantine Books (New York, NY, 1976; ISBN 0-345-25680-8).
- Eric Clapton, Eric Clapton: The Autobiography, Century (London, 2007; ISBN 978-1-84605-309-2).
- Alan Clayson, George Harrison, Sanctuary (London, 2003; ISBN 1-86074-489-3).
- Peter Doggett, You Never Give Me Your Money: The Beatles After the Breakup, It Books (New York, NY, 2011; ISBN 978-0-06-177418-8).
- The Editors of Rolling Stone, Harrison, Rolling Stone Press/Simon & Schuster (New York, NY, 2002; ISBN 0-7432-3581-9).
- Joshua M. Greene, Here Comes the Sun: The Spiritual and Musical Journey of George Harrison, John Wiley & Sons (Hoboken, NJ, 2006; ISBN 978-0-470-12780-3).
- John Harris, "A Quiet Storm", Mojo, July 2001, pp. 66–74.
- George Harrison, I Me Mine, Chronicle Books (San Francisco, CA, 2002 [1980]; ISBN 0-8118-3793-9).
- Olivia Harrison, George Harrison: Living in the Material World, Abrams (New York, NY, 2011; ISBN 978-1-4197-0220-4).
- Levon Helm (with Stephen Davis), This Wheel's on Fire: Levon Helm and the Story of The Band, A Cappella Books (Chicago, IL, 2000; ISBN 978-1-55652-405-9).
- Mark Hertsgaard, A Day in the Life: The Music and Artistry of the Beatles, Pan Books (London, 1996; ISBN 0-330-33891-9).
- Elliot J. Huntley, Mystical One: George Harrison – After the Break-up of the Beatles, Guernica Editions (Toronto, ON, 2006; ISBN 1-55071-197-0).
- Chris Ingham, The Rough Guide to the Beatles, Rough Guides/Penguin (London, 2006; 2nd edn; ISBN 978-1-84836-525-4).
- Ian Inglis, The Words and Music of George Harrison, Praeger (Santa Barbara, CA, 2010; ISBN 978-0-313-37532-3).
- Peter Lavezzoli, The Dawn of Indian Music in the West, Continuum (New York, NY, 2006; ISBN 0-8264-2819-3).
- Simon Leng, While My Guitar Gently Weeps: The Music of George Harrison, Hal Leonard (Milwaukee, WI, 2006; ISBN 1-4234-0609-5).
- Ian MacDonald, Revolution in the Head: The Beatles' Records and the Sixties, Pimlico (London, 1998; ISBN 0-7126-6697-4).
- Chip Madinger & Mark Easter, Eight Arms to Hold You: The Solo Beatles Compendium, 44.1 Productions (Chesterfield, MO, 2000; ISBN 0-615-11724-4).
- Barry Miles, The Beatles Diary Volume 1: The Beatles Years, Omnibus Press (London, 2001; ISBN 0-7119-8308-9).
- Mojo Special Limited Edition: 1000 Days of Revolution (The Beatles' Final Years – Jan 1, 1968 to Sept 27, 1970), Emap (London, 2003).
- Robert Rodriguez, Fab Four FAQ 2.0: The Beatles' Solo Years, 1970–1980, Backbeat Books (Milwaukee, WI, 2010; ISBN 978-1-4165-9093-4).
- Nicholas Schaffner, The Beatles Forever, McGraw-Hill (New York, NY, 1978; ISBN 0-07-055087-5).
- Bruce Spizer, The Beatles Solo on Apple Records, 498 Productions (New Orleans, LA, 2005; ISBN 0-9662649-5-9).
- Doug Sulpy & Ray Schweighardt, Get Back: The Unauthorized Chronicle of The Beatles' Let It Be Disaster, St. Martin's Griffin (New York, 1997; ISBN 0-312-19981-3).
- Gary Tillery, Working Class Mystic: A Spiritual Biography of George Harrison, Quest Books (Wheaton, IL, 2011; ISBN 978-0-8356-0900-5).
- Bobby Whitlock (with Marc Roberty), Bobby Whitlock: A Rock 'n' Roll Autobiography, McFarland (Jefferson, NC, 2010; ISBN 978-0-7864-6190-5).
- Bob Woffinden, The Beatles Apart, Proteus (London, 1981; ISBN 0-906071-89-5).
- Kenneth Womack, The Beatles Encyclopedia: Everything Fab Four, ABC-CLIO (Santa Barbara, CA, 2014; ISBN 978-0-313-39171-2).
