= Free Country (album) =

Studio album by Joel Harrison
- Released: June 17, 2003
- Recorded: January 2002 – January 2003
- Studio: Peter Karl Recording Studio, Brooklyn, NY
- Genre: Jazz
- Length: 65:49
- Label: ACT
- Producer: Joel Harrison

Free Country is an album by the American jazz guitarist and arranger Joel Harrison released in June 2003. It consists of jazz interpretations of country and folk songs. The album contains musical contributions from David Binney, Uri Caine and, as a guest vocalist, Norah Jones. Free Country has received praise from music critics for its success in fusing the jazz and country genres.

== Inspiration and recording ==
Harrison recorded Free Country at the Peter Karl Recording Studio in Brooklyn, New York between January 2002 and January 2003. He describes the album as "a collection of old Country and Appalachian tunes arranged in unusual, even radical, ways". The selections included well-known country songs by Johnny Cash ("I Walk the Line", "Folsom Prison Blues"), Merle Haggard ("Sing Me Back Home"), George Jones ("Tender Years") and Pee Wee King (Tennessee Waltz). Among the folk pieces were Woody Guthrie's "This Land Is Your Land" and the traditional "Lonesome Road Blues" and "Hell Broke Loose in Georgia". Harrison summed up the recordings as "my sonic view of the experiment known as America – not the billboard, but the underbelly".

His main accompanists included jazz saxophonist David Binney and violinist Rob Thomas. Singer Norah Jones and jazz pianist Uri Caine were among the featured guests. In a 2014 interview for Guitar Player, Harrison said that part of the attraction of making Free Country, as with his 2005 album of George Harrison compositions, Harrison on Harrison, was that the material was not usually played by jazz artists, and so these projects allowed him the freedom to "[create] my own jazz repertoire".

== Release and reception ==
Professional ratings
Review scores
Source	Rating
All About Jazz	4/5 stars
AllMusic	4/5 stars
JazzTimes	(favorable)

Free Country was released by HighNote Records and ACT Music on June 17, 2003. James Christopher Monger of AllMusic describes it as one of the artist's "critically lauded albums". Writing in Billboard magazine in December 2003, Dan Ouellette listed the album among his choice of the best CDs that "slipped under most radar screens" during the year and described it as a "country-meets-jazz gem".

In his contemporary review for All About Jazz, Julian Derry admired the free-form and improvisational performances over the more faithful readings of the source material. He found that much of the album "oscillates between Norah Jones schmaltz, modern bop and free jazz". Derry concluded that it was "an imperfect but exciting release that deserves recognition for its clever and innovative approach". In The Oregonian, Marty Hughely said: "Harrison's arrangements are particularly elastic, finding new strains of elegant grace and wild anxiety, tender comfort and enduring sadness ... he doesn't remove structure, he removes stricture." Marcus Croder of The Sacramento Bee welcomed Jones' "soft drawl" on the "somber, soulful reading of Johnny Cash's I Walk the Line and an equally adventurous Tennessee Waltz", yet he noted: "But by the time this transcendent record is over, you nearly forget Jones was even on it. Harrison has created a grand tribute to divergent musical genres, which he shows have more in common than anyone would have guessed."

Writing in JazzTimes, John Murph praised Harrison's "distinctive compositional acumen" and especially his guitar playing beside Jones' vocal on "I Walk the Line", as well as his own singing on the country ballads "Lonesome Road Blues" and "Tender Years". Murph also highlighted "This Land Is Your Land" for capturing the same "serene quietness of the countryside and the disquieting tenor of the U.S. the day after 9/11". He added of "Folsom Prison Blues": "Harrison gives his most rollicking guitar performance on disc, slashing out dissonant rockabilly with gleeful abandonment."

Scott Yanow of AllMusic describes Free Country as an apt title for a "strange but consistently colorful set". While he finds the various singers unexceptional and "This Land Is Your Land" "surprisingly downbeat", Yanow admires Binney's alto saxophone playing and the musical support provided by Thomas, Caine and accordionist Tony Cedras. In NPR's online poll "The Best Songs of 2003: All Songs Considered", music journalist Jim Fusilli selected Harrison's version of "This Is Your Land" as the first of three personal favourites. Fusilli wrote: "the performance ultimately transcends genre: it's just a new way of looking at a familiar tune, a beloved American classic. For me, it became a metaphor for how we have to remember to look at the US with fresh, probing eyes and understand that America is a work in progress, subject to a variety of affectionate interpretations."

== Track listing ==
According to the 2003 CD credits:

1. "I Walk the Line" (Johnny Cash) – 5:04
2. "Lonesome Road Blues" (trad.) – 3:29
3. "Wayfaring Stranger" (trad.) – 6:47
4. "This Land Is Your Land" (Woody Guthrie) – 6:01
5. "Twelve Gates to the City" (trad.) – 4:56
6. "Tennessee Waltz" (Pee Wee King, Redd Stewart) – 6:09
7. "Hell Broke Loose in Georgia" (trad.) – 5:24
8. "Folsom Prison Blues" (Cash) – 6:39
9. "Tender Years" (George Jones) – 3:12
10. "Will the Circle Be Unbroken" (A.P. Carter) – 6:05
11. "Sing Me Back Home" (Merle Haggard) – 3:36
12. "Lone Pilgrim" (trad.) – 8:16

== Personnel ==
According to the 2003 CD credits:

- Joel Harrison – electric, fretless and steel guitars; vocals; cassette machine
- David Binney – saxophone, sampler
- Rob Thomas – violin
- Sean Conly – bass
- Alison Miller – drums
- Norah Jones – vocals
- Uri Caine – piano
- Tony Cedras – accordion
- Jen Chapin – vocals
- Raz Kennedy – vocals
- Adam Levy – vocals
- Dan Weiss – drums
- Stephan Crump – bass
- Rob Burger – keyboards
- Todd Isler – percussion
