= In My Father's House (song) =

Song by The Blackwood Brothers
- Recorded: 1954
- Genre: Gospel
- Songwriter: Unknown

"In My Father's House" is a gospel song by the Blackwood Brothers, originally recorded in 1954. It was one of only two songs, the other being "I Have But One Goal", which the group recorded between 1953 and 1956.

Elvis Presley recorded the song at RCA Studios on October 30, 1960, and it appears on the album His Hand in Mine. Jimmy Blackwood was lead singer of the Blackwoods, but it was Jake Hess, lead for the Statesmen, who was a major influence on Elvis. The version recorded by Elvis is slow, in the key of B Major and progresses from B to E major, to C# 7 to F#7.

== Biblical reference ==
The spiritual song makes reference to the King James Version of the Bible in John 14:2 which says "In my Father's house are many mansions: if [it were] not [so], I would have told you. I go to prepare a place for you." The song refers to how "In My Father's House are many mansions" and how God is preparing a mansion in heaven. It also refers to how Jesus died on the cross to "bear my sorrow" and "so souls like you may have new life".

Aileen Hanks, a blind singer, composed the lyrics and music of this gospel song introduced by the Blackwood Brothers Quartet and later rearranged and recorded by Elvis Presley.

Elvis was said to be particularly fond of playing hymns on his gilded piano in Graceland's Music Room, "talking about home as heaven and the mansion as a mark of God's favor."
