= John Harris (critic) =

British journalist, writer and critic (born 1969)

- Born: 1969 (age 56–57)
- Education: The Queen's College, Oxford
- Occupations: Journalist; writer; critic
- Notable work: The Last Party: Britpop, Blair and the Demise of English Rock (2003); Hail! Hail! Rock'n'Roll (2009)

John Harris (born 1969) is a British journalist, writer and critic. He is the author of The Last Party: Britpop, Blair and the Demise of English Rock (2003); So Now Who Do We Vote For?, which examined the 2005 UK general election; a 2006 behind-the-scenes look at the production of Pink Floyd's The Dark Side of the Moon; and Hail! Hail! Rock'n'Roll (2009). His articles have appeared in Select, Q, Mojo, Shindig!, Rolling Stone, Classic Rock, The Independent, the New Statesman, The Times and The Guardian.

== Early life ==
Harris was born in 1969 and raised in Wilmslow in north Cheshire; his father was a university lecturer in nuclear engineering, and his mother a teacher who was the daughter of a nuclear research chemist. He became fixated by pop music at an early age.

Harris attended the comprehensive Wilmslow County High School (at the same time as members of the band Doves), then went to Loreto College, Manchester, a Roman Catholic sixth form college sited between the University of Manchester and Old Trafford. He applied to study Modern History at Keble College, Oxford, but was rejected, and claimed his membership of left-wing organisations had not won him many favours with such a traditional and conservative college. He spent three years studying philosophy, politics and economics at another Oxford college, Queen's, between 1989 and 1992.

== Media career ==
In 1991, Harris joined Melody Maker. Between 1993 and the summer of 1995, he wrote for the NME. In 1995, he was named editor of Select magazine after a brief stint with Q.

In 1995, Harris resumed his career as a freelance writer, writing about pop music, politics and a variety of other subjects. His articles have appeared in Q, Mojo, Rolling Stone, The Independent, the New Statesman, The Times and The Guardian. He presented a BBC Four documentary on the musical movement, The Britpop Story.

In addition to writing, Harris often appears on television programmes concerned with late 1980s/early 1990s British pop music, as well as being a regular pundit on BBC Two's Newsnight Review. In 2010 he created the video series Anywhere but Westminster for The Guardian, documenting the political feelings of people around the country. In December 2018 Harris wrote and presented a four-part BBC Radio 4 series, Tyranny of Story. Harris is a political columnist for The Guardian and is one of the presenters of the newspaper’s Politics Weekly UK podcast.

Harris is the editor of the companion book, published on 12 October 2021, of the documentary The Beatles: Get Back. The illustrated book compiles conversations recorded during the sessions of the album Let It Be. In addition, he hosted a short promotional film for the project called The Beatles, Get Back and London: On the Trail of a Timeless Story. He also contributed a chapter in the hardcover book accompanying the release of the Let It Be: Special Edition that same year.

== Personal life ==
Harris lives in Frome, Somerset. He has been an ethical vegetarian since the mid-1980s.

== Bibliography ==
- The Last Party: Britpop, Blair and the Demise of English Rock, Fourth Estate, May 2003 by Fourth Estate; re-released in 2004 as Britpop: Cool Britania and the Spectacular Demise of English Rock by Da Capo Press.
- So Now Who Do We Vote For?, an examination of the 2005 UK general election; London: Faber and Faber, 2005.
- The Dark Side of the Moon: The Making of the Pink Floyd Masterpiece, Da Capo Press, 2005.
- Hail! Hail! Rock'n'Roll: The Ultimate Guide to the Music, the Myths and the Madness, Sphere, October 2009.
