= Joel Harrison =

American jazz guitarist, singer, composer, and arranger

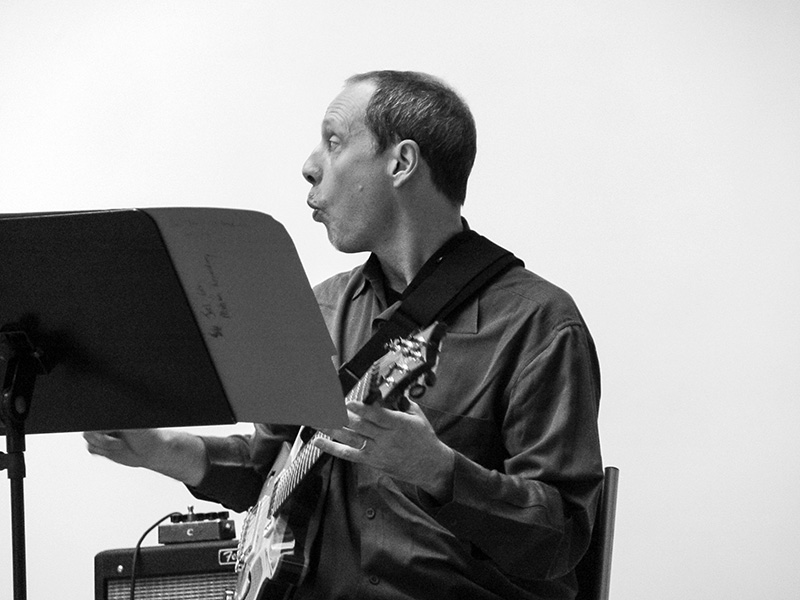
- Harrison in Aarhus in Denmark, 2011

Background information
- Born: July 27, 1957 (age 67); Washington, D.C., United States
- Genres: Jazz, avant-garde jazz
- Occupation(s): Musician, composer, arranger
- Instrument: Guitar
- Labels: 9 Winds, Koch Jazz, ACT, HighNote, Sunnyside, Cuneiform, Whirlwind
- Website: www.joelharrison.com

Joel Harrison is an American jazz guitarist, singer, composer, and arranger.

== Career ==
Harrison was born in Washington, D.C., and graduated from Bard College, New York, in 1980 with a Bachelor of Arts in composition and performance. His father was Gilbert Harrison, the editor and owner of the magazine The New Republic, and his mother was Anne Harrison (née Blaine).

Harrison has identified the Beatles, Jimi Hendrix, the Allman Brothers Band and Washington guitarist Danny Gatton as early influences. Having begun his career as a musician in Boston during the early 1980s, Harrison moved to the Bay Area of San Francisco, where he led several musical ensembles and became a session musician. Since 1999, he has been based in New York City. His mentors and teachers have included Joan Tower, Ali Akbar Khan, W. A. Mathieu, and Charlie Banacos.

In 2010, Harrison was appointed a Guggenheim Fellow. That same year, he founded the Alternative Guitar Summit (AGS), an annual festival in New York that aims to present and explore the guitar's potential in all musical genres. The AGS advisory board is headed by Pat Metheny, while the Summit has included dozens of guitarists including Marc Ribot, Nels Cline, Michael Gregory Jackson, Bill Frisell, Fred Frith, Steve Cardenas, and Miles Okazaki.

Several of Harrison's albums have received critical acclaim, including Free Country (2003), Harrison on Harrison (2005) and Urban Myths (2009). His work has included film scores, big-band projects, and a collaboration with Indian sarod player Anupam Shobhakar titled Leave the Door Open (2013). The AllMusic website describes Harrison's style as an "electrifying blend of creative jazz, modern classical, and ethnic fusion", while Down Beat magazine has rated him "a guitarist, composer and arranger of amazing skill and breadth". His collaborators have included Dave Liebman, Donny McCaslin, Gary Versace, David Binney, Dewey Redman, Norah Jones, Uri Caine and Christian Howes.

== Discography ==
=== As leader ===
- 3 + 3 = 7 (Nine Winds, 1996)
- Range of Motion (Koch, 1997)
- Transience Spirit (Nectar, 2001)
- Free Country (ACT, 2003)
- So Long 2nd Street (ACT, 2004)
- Harrison On Harrison (HighNote, 2005)
- Harbor (HighNote, 2007)
- Passing Train (Intuition, 2008)
- The Wheel (Intuition, 2008)
- Urban Myths (HighNote, 2009)
- The Music of Paul Motian (Sunnyside, 2010)
- Search (Sunnyside, 2011)
- Holy Abyss with Lorenzo Feliciati (Cuneiform, 2012)
- Infinite Possibility (Sunnyside, 2013)
- Mother Stump (Cuneiform, 2014)
- Multiplicity: Leave the Door Open with Anupam Shobhakar (Whirlwind, 2014)
- Spirit House (Whirlwind, 2015)
- The Other River (Whirlwind, 2017)
- Angel Band Vol. 3: Free Country (HighNote, 2018)
- Still Point: Turning World (Whirlwind, 2019)
- America at War (Sunnyside, 2020)
- Guitar Talk (AGS Recordings, 2021)
- The Stardust Reunion Band (AGS Recordings, 2023)
- The Great Mirage (with Anthony Pirog) (AGS Recordings, 2023)

=== As sideman ===
- Laura Andel, In::tension:. (Rossbin, 2005)
- Adam Rudolph, Turning Towards the Light (Cuneiform, 2015)
