= Ballad of Sir Frankie Crisp (Let It Roll) =

1970 song by English rock musician George Harrison

- Cover of the original Hansen Publishing sheet music for the song

Song by George Harrison

from the album All Things Must Pass
- Released: 27 November 1970
- Genre: Folk rock
- Length: 3:48
- Label: Apple
- Songwriter(s): George Harrison
- Producer(s): George Harrison, Phil Spector

"Ballad of Sir Frankie Crisp (Let It Roll)" is a song by English rock musician George Harrison from his 1970 triple album All Things Must Pass. Harrison wrote the song as a tribute to Frank Crisp, a nineteenth-century lawyer and the original owner of Friar Park – the Victorian Gothic residence in Henley-on-Thames, Oxfordshire, that Harrison purchased in early 1970. Commentators have likened the song to a cinematic journey through the grand house and the grounds of the estate.

Pete Drake, Billy Preston, Gary Wright, Klaus Voormann and Alan White played on the recording. It was co-produced by Phil Spector, whose heavy use of reverb adds to the ethereal quality of the song. AllMusic critic Scott Janovitz describes "Ballad of Sir Frankie Crisp (Let It Roll)" as offering "a glimpse of the true George Harrison – at once mystical, humorous, solitary, playful, and serious".

Crisp's eccentric homilies, which the former Beatle discovered inscribed inside the house and around the property, inspired subsequent compositions of Harrison's, including "Ding Dong, Ding Dong" and "The Answer's at the End". Together with the Friar Park-shot album cover for All Things Must Pass, "Ballad of Sir Frankie Crisp" established an association between Harrison and his Henley estate that has continued since his death in November 2001. The song gained further notability in 2009 when it provided the title for Harrison's posthumous compilation Let It Roll. My Morning Jacket lead singer Jim James and Dhani Harrison are among the singers who have recorded the song.

== Background ==
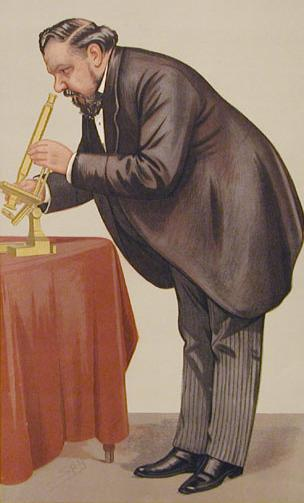
Frank Crisp, by Leslie Ward, 1891

Since 1965, George Harrison and his wife, Pattie Boyd, had lived in Kinfauns in Surrey, south of London. The house was a bungalow and too small to accommodate a home recording studio, so the couple began a year-long search for a larger property, concentrating on an area west of London encompassing the counties of Berkshire and Oxfordshire. In January 1970, Harrison purchased the 120-room Friar Park, set on 33 acres of land, just west of Henley-on-Thames. Previously the home of an order of Roman Catholic nuns, the Salesians of Don Bosco, the four-storey house and its grounds were in a dilapidated state, and it was not until the start of March that Harrison and Boyd moved from a worker's cottage and into the main residence.

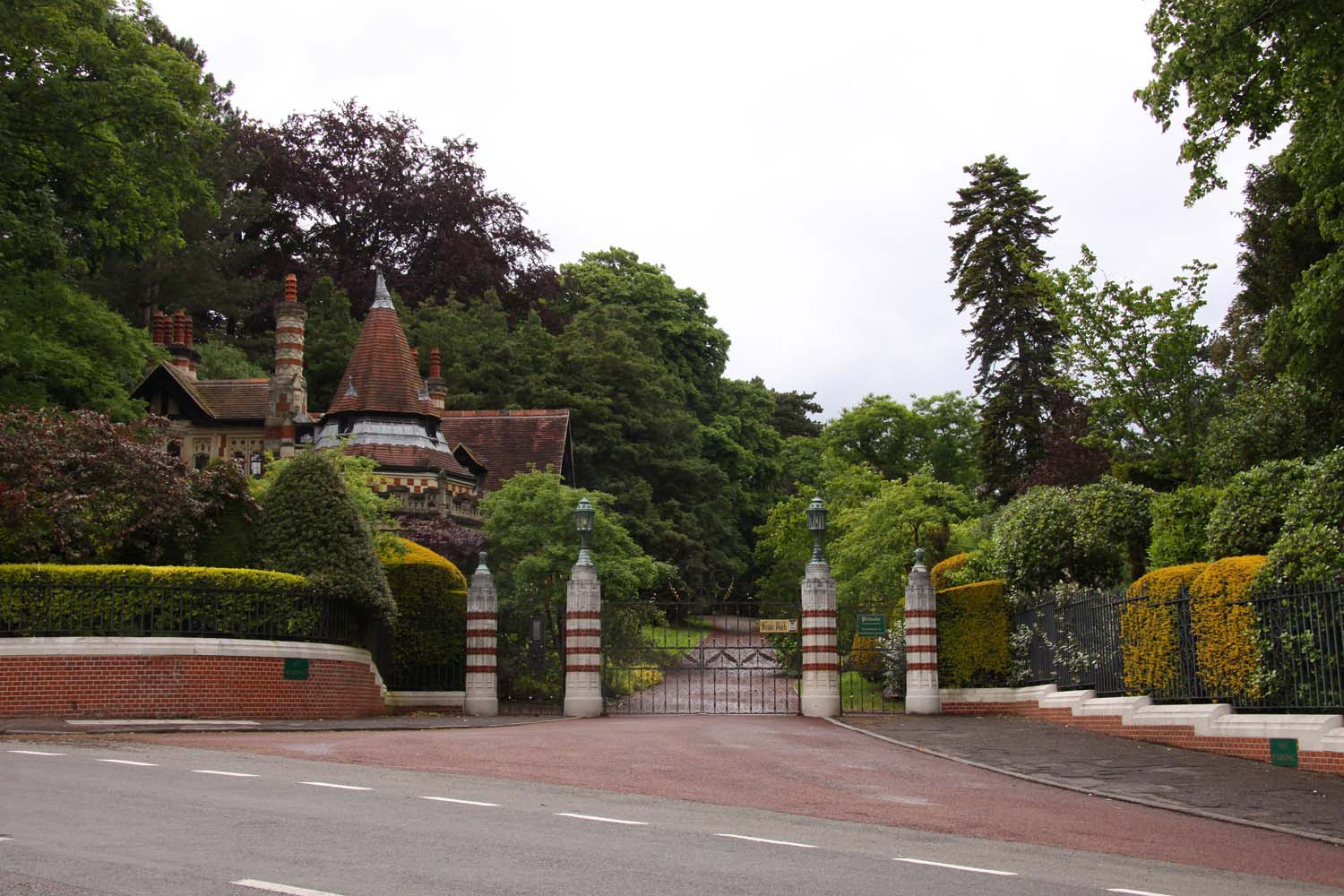
The entrance to Friar Park, including caretaker's lodge; photo by Steve Daniels

The house was built in 1898, on the site of a thirteenth-century monastery, by Sir Frank Crisp, a successful City of London solicitor, microscopist and horticulturalist well known for his eccentricities. Harrison described Crisp as a cross between Lewis Carroll and Walt Disney. While compiling Harrison's autobiography, I, Me, Mine, in the late 1970s, Derek Taylor observed that Harrison "frequently talks as if [Crisp] were still alive". Clean-up work during the first few months at Friar Park unearthed various legacies of Crisp's time there, such as stone and wood engravings containing whimsical homilies, some of which the Salesian nuns had concealed or painted over. The 10 acres of Crisp's formal gardens were so overrun with weeds that Harrison and his friend from the Hare Krishna movement, Shyamasundar Das, used World War II-era flamethrowers to clear some of the land. (Note: As well as aligning himself with the spiritual path espoused by the International Society for Krishna Consciousness (ISKCON), as the movement is formally known, Harrison produced recordings by ISKCON's London branch, the Radha Krishna Temple. Their eponymous album was released on Apple Records in May 1971 and included the two international hit singles "Hare Krishna Mantra" and "Govinda".) Among the garden features was a series of tiered lakes connected by tunnels, to the south-east of the house, and an Alpine rock garden topped by a 20-foot replica of the Matterhorn, to the north-west.

On 17 March 1970, despite the property's state of disrepair, the Harrisons threw a party to celebrate Pattie's 26th birthday and St Patrick's Day. According to their friend and assistant Chris O'Dell, the guest list comprised all the other Beatles and their wives, as well as insiders such as Derek and Joan Taylor, Neil Aspinall and his wife Susie, Peter Brown, and Klaus and Christine Voormann. In what was a rare social get-together for the Beatles, three weeks before Paul McCartney announced he was leaving the band, the party was a "great success", O'Dell writes. (Note: Author Peter Doggett has questioned the likelihood of McCartney attending Boyd's party, however, citing his work schedule to complete the McCartney album and his strained relationship with the other Beatles.) Shortly afterwards, Harrison invited members of the London-based Hare Krishna movement to help with the restoration work, primarily in the grounds of Friar Park, and accommodated the devotees and their families in a wing of the house. While satisfying Harrison's spiritual convictions, these visitors proved less welcome to Boyd, who found herself shut out of her husband's life. (Note: Harrison's devotion to his spiritual goals and, conversely, his frequent adulterous affairs resulted in Boyd leaving him for his best friend, Eric Clapton, after she had spurned Clapton's advances in November 1970. During that time, Harrison's increased support for the Hare Krishna movement saw him purchase another English country property, Bhaktivedanta Manor, in February 1973, as an ISKCON temple and study centre.)

== Composition ==
It was all rotting and nobody was interested [in preserving Friar Park]. They were trying to pull it down and destroy it. Now it's a listed building ... I wrote a song about the fella who built it, on All Things Must Pass ...

– George Harrison

Following the Beatles' break-up on 10 April 1970, and having long discussed the possibility of recording a solo album of his songs, Harrison committed to the project over dinner at Friar Park with Boyd, O'Dell and Terry Doran, his friend and temporary estate manager. The following month, Harrison performed a selection of his songs in London for Phil Spector, his co-producer on All Things Must Pass, one of which was "Everybody, Nobody". With its reference to roads and the UK's Highway Code, "Everybody, Nobody" has been described by musical biographer Simon Leng as Harrison's first "motoring" song. (Note: Subsequent Harrison compositions that reflect his passion for motoring, particularly high-performance cars and Formula 1, include "It's What You Value" and "Faster".) Harrison soon completely rewrote the lyrics and took part of the melody for his first of several musical tributes to Crisp and Friar Park – titled "Ballad of Sir Frankie Crisp (Let It Roll)". The result, in Leng's opinion, was a signpost to its composer's future involvement in film, an interest that, like gardening and motorsport, would flourish in a dwelling that offered "privacy without imprisonment".

Leng writes that the song's lyrics read "like a movie script", with verse one "panning" from the house outside to the garden:

Let it roll across the floor
Through the hall and out the door
To the fountain of perpetual mirth
Let it roll for all it's worth ...

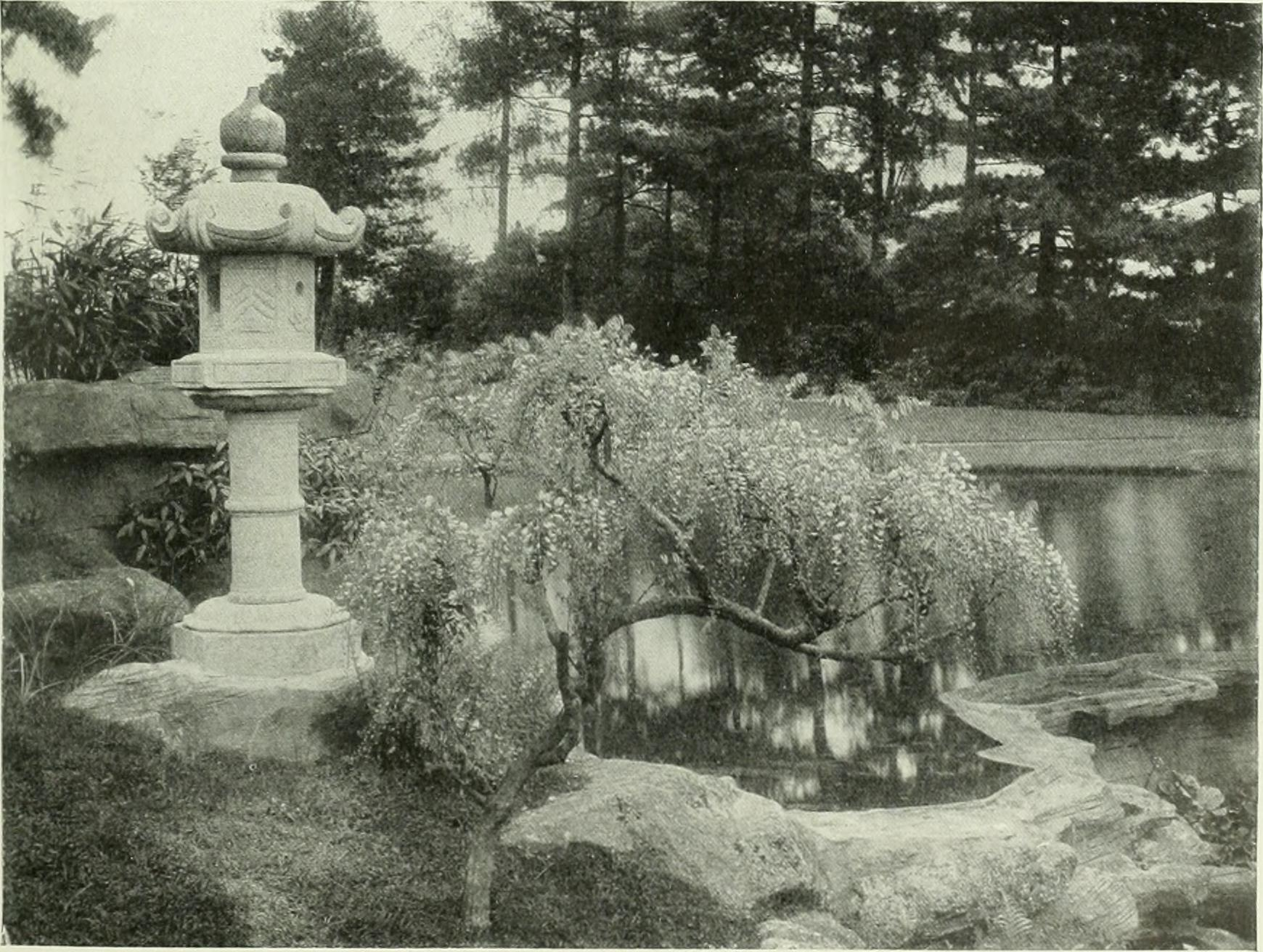
Japanese stone lantern and dwarf wistaria at Friar Park in the late 1890s, during Crisp's time as owner

In his book The Words and Music of George Harrison, Ian Inglis similarly views the song as "a guided tour of the house and grounds", with Harrison "pointing out features of particular interest". After "scene two"'s setting – "among the weeds" and inside Friar Park's formal maze – the third verse focuses on the property's grottos and extended woodland.

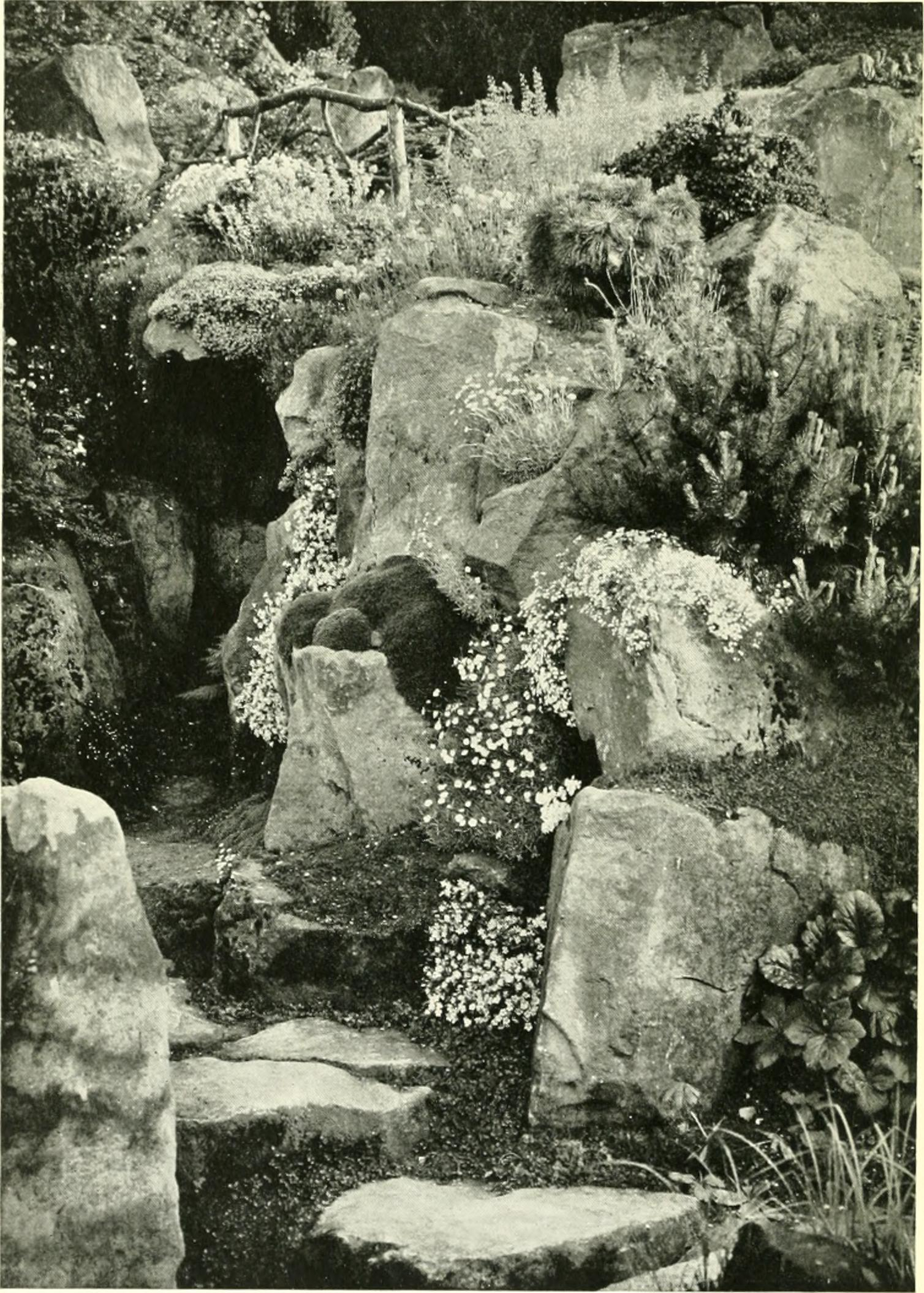
Part of the property's rock garden, pictured in 1905

The song's "final scene" focuses on what Leng calls "the illusions within the illusion", as the narrative returns to the interior of the house and the "real people" living there. The lyrics include mentions of housekeepers and "the spiritually awakened Lord and Lady", Leng writes, before the scene "rolls off into the unknown beyond":

Fools' illusions everywhere
Joan and Molly sweeps the stair
Eyes that shining full of inner light
Let it roll into the night ...

Rather than people, Inglis views the first of these lines as a reference to the "many extraordinary features Crisp had installed", among them "fantastic statues, bizarre gargoyles, illuminated caverns ... and hidden stepping-stones". In a song otherwise free of religiosity, theologian Dale Allison interprets "Fools illusions everywhere" as a typical Harrison statement regarding māyā – the illusory nature of human existence.

According to Harrison's later recollection, Spector suggested that "Ballad of Sir Frankie Crisp" might attract a few cover versions if he changed the lyrics. In I, Me, Mine, Harrison acknowledges that the song was "a piece of personal indulgence", but "those words were written because that's what it was" – a tribute to Frank Crisp. A number of Crisp's homilies directly inspired other Harrison songs during the first half of the 1970s, such as "Ding Dong, Ding Dong" and "The Answer's at the End". (Note: Harrison recorded "Ding Dong" at his Friar Park studio, FPSHOT, in November 1973 and included Crisp's contribution of "Spirit" among the musicians' credits for the song on his Dark Horse album (1974). Set up originally as a 16-track recording facility in 1971, FPSHOT came to be recognised as "the world's most sophisticated private recording complex", according to Harrison biographer Alan Clayson.) Harrison went on to identify philosophically with Crisp, of whom he writes elsewhere in I, Me, Mine: "Sir Frank helped my awareness; whatever it was I felt became stronger, or found more expression by moving into that house, because everything stepped up or was heightened." Leng considers that the song, along with "All Things Must Pass", predicts Harrison's eventual "retreat into an internal musical dialogue, set amid the woods and gardens of Friar Park", a change of perspective marked by his 1979 eponymous solo album.

== Recording ==
Harrison's solo performance of "Everybody, Nobody" for Phil Spector took place at Abbey Road Studios on 20 May 1970, a recording since made available unofficially on the Beware of ABKCO! bootleg album. Harrison completed the rewrite, "Ballad of Sir Frankie Crisp", within a matter of weeks, judging by the appearance of pedal steel virtuoso Pete Drake on the session, which was held at Abbey Road between 26 May and early June. By late June, Drake was home in Nashville producing Ringo Starr's second solo album, Beaucoups of Blues (1970), the recording of which, author Bob Woffinden suggested in 1981, "was probably completed more quickly than any one of the tracks on All Things Must Pass". Part of the reason for Harrison taking so long to make his album was the interruption to recording caused by his frequent visits to Liverpool's neurological hospital, where his mother was dying of cancer. Following her death on 7 July, Harrison invited his elder brothers Harry and Peter to live on the Friar Park estate and manage a team of full-time gardeners and botanists. (Note: Another factor behind All Things Must Pass's five-month production schedule was the considerable backlog of songs that Harrison had accumulated during the final years of the Beatles. Woffinden wrote of Harrison and Spector's approach: "Apparently, they thought there was enough material for an album when they went into the studios, but things went very well so they decided to make it a double album, and then things went fantastically well, so it somehow became a treble ...")

The released recording of "Ballad of Sir Frankie Crisp", in Leng's words, is as "an ethereal and echoey version of the Band's minimalist melodicism", in which Drake's pedal steel guitar represents the "ectoplasmic" Crisp floating through the song, and Harrison "sounds like he's recorded his vocal track in one of the park's legendary caves". The line-up of musicians included three keyboards players, which Leng and author Bruce Spizer list as Bobby Whitlock (on piano), Billy Preston (organ) and Gary Wright (electric piano). Whitlock himself has stated that he played piano very rarely during the All Things Must Pass sessions, however. In his song-by-song description of the album, Whitlock does not list himself among the musicians on "Ballad of Sir Frankie Crisp"; he offers a line-up that includes Preston on piano and he writes of the other keyboard parts: "This track is swimming with the two Garys" – Wright and Gary Brooker. The master tape sheet lists piano, harmonium and organ across tracks 5 and 6 of the 8-track tape.

Although Leng credits the song's acoustic guitar parts to Harrison alone, author Bill Harry writes that Peter Frampton played on this and the other tracks recorded with Drake. Playing the bass, as he did on most of All Things Must Pass, was Klaus Voormann, who would be another to find sanctuary at Friar Park. Harrison offered him refuge from the media in March and April 1971, when reports had Voormann linked to a supposed Beatles offshoot band, along with Harrison, Starr and John Lennon.

While relatively free of the Wall of Sound production style found elsewhere on the album, the song's "sense of the mysterious" is conveyed through Spector's liberal use of reverb, Alan Clayson writes, particularly on Alan White's snare drum and Harrison's murmured backing vocals following verses two and four. The words that Harrison half-sings are "Oh, Sir Frankie Crisp"; this part and the lead vocal were overdubbed at Trident Studios in central London, at Spector's suggestion. Aided by the swirling sound of Hammond organ, and Leslie treatment on the piano and pedal steel tracks, the effect of Spector's production enshrouded "the whole tale in a reverb-induced haze", as Scott Janovitz of AllMusic puts it.

== Release and reception ==
Cover of Harrison's All Things Must Pass triple album, depicting him at Friar Park surrounded by four of Crisp's garden gnomes

Delayed from its intended release date by over a month due to the extended period of production, All Things Must Pass was issued on Apple Records in late November 1970 to great acclaim. The triple album featured a cover photo of Harrison dressed in gardening attire, seated on the main lawn of Friar Park's south garden and surrounded by four figures from Crisp's extensive collection of Bavarian gnomes. Having been stolen "in about 1871", according to photographer Barry Feinstein, the figures had just been returned to Friar Park and placed on the grass. Commentators interpret Feinstein's photo as representing Harrison's removal from the Beatles' collective identity, and the cover helped establish a synonymity between Harrison and Friar Park that Alan Clayson has described as equalling that between Queen Elizabeth II and Windsor Castle.

On release, "Ballad of Sir Frankie Crisp (Let It Roll)"'s lyrical affectations provoked comment from American reviewers in particular. Ben Gerson of Rolling Stone remarked that there were "lots of 'Ye's' to remind us it's a ballad", but identified the song as part of the album's "musical core", the "brooding essays on living, loving, and dying". Village Voice contributor Nicholas Schaffner recognised it as an "olde English ballad" dedicated to what he mistakenly called "George's 17th-century castle". To the NME's Alan Smith, the track was a "meandering song-tale ... which may take a little longer for me to appreciate". Acknowledging that listeners in 1970–71 might have been "mystified" by Harrison's lyrics, Bruce Spizer has written of this "catchy ballad": "its beautiful melody and hook-laden refrain ensured that it would be one of the album's highlights."

More recently, Clayson has described "Ballad of Sir Frankie Crisp" as "[c]ouched in mediaeval expression" and the most "Beatle-esque" of all the songs found on All Things Must Pass, featuring an arrangement that is "a breath of fresh air". Former Mojo editor Mat Snow also acknowledges the cryptic quality of the lyrics – "unless one happened to know that George and Pattie had just moved to ... a magnificent Gothic pile near Henley-on-Thames" – and considers the song "hauntingly beautiful". Less impressed, in The Rough Guide to the Beatles, Chris Ingham deems the track "drearily whimsical" and an example of how "the main song set [on All Things Must Pass] dips in the middle".

Along with his description of it as a "rolling filmic snapshot" of Friar Park, Simon Leng views "Ballad of Sir Frankie Crisp" as a "musical companion piece" to Feinstein's album cover image: "[The song] conjures an allegorical dream world, populated by smirking gnomes ... a disembodied Victorian lawyer, and, in George Harrison, a refugee from the world's attention." Leng sees Harrison's 1976 film clip for "Crackerbox Palace" as "the celluloid realization of the 'Let it Roll' script". Scott Janovitz likewise views the track as "a tour of the grounds" while praising its "darkly beautiful" melody. "Like no other Harrison song," Janovitz adds, "'The Ballad of Sir Frankie Crisp' offers a glimpse of the true George Harrison – at once mystical, humorous, solitary, playful, and serious."

== Subsequent releases and cover versions ==
The title of Harrison's only career-spanning compilation album, Let It Roll: Songs by George Harrison (2009), was derived from "Ballad of Sir Frankie Crisp (Let It Roll)", which also appears on the album. Shortly after Harrison's death on 29 November 2001, My Morning Jacket lead singer Jim James recorded the track for his EP of George Harrison cover songs, Tribute To, issued in August 2009.

In 2010, the producers of CBS's situation comedy How I Met Your Mother used "Ballad of Sir Frankie Crisp" as a musical theme bookending season 6 of the show. Coinciding with the release of Martin Scorsese's documentary George Harrison: Living in the Material World, a version of the song by Alessi's Ark appeared on Harrison Covered, a tribute CD accompanying the November 2011 issue of Mojo magazine.

Los Angeles band Big Black Delta and Harrison's son Dhani performed "Ballad of Sir Frankie Crisp" on the US television show Conan in September 2014. The performance was part of a week-long promotion for George Harrison's The Apple Years 1968–75 box set.

== Personnel ==
The musicians who performed on the recording are believed to be as follows:

- George Harrison – vocals, acoustic guitars, backing vocal
- Pete Drake – pedal steel
- Peter Frampton – acoustic guitar
- Billy Preston – piano
- Gary Wright – organ or harmonium
- Gary Brooker – harmonium or organ
- Klaus Voormann – bass
- Alan White – drums
- uncredited – tambourine

== Sources ==
- Dale C. Allison Jr., The Love There That's Sleeping: The Art and Spirituality of George Harrison, Continuum (New York, NY, 2006; ISBN 978-0-8264-1917-0).
- Keith Badman, The Beatles Diary Volume 2: After the Break-Up 1970–2001, Omnibus Press (London, 2001; ISBN 0-7119-8307-0).
- Pattie Boyd (with Penny Junor), Wonderful Today: The Autobiography, Headline Review (London, 2007; ISBN 978-0-7553-1646-5).
- Alan Clayson, George Harrison, Sanctuary (London, 2003; ISBN 1-86074-489-3).
- Peter Doggett, You Never Give Me Your Money: The Beatles After the Breakup, It Books (New York, NY, 2011; ISBN 978-0-06-177418-8).
- The Editors of Rolling Stone, Harrison, Rolling Stone Press/Simon & Schuster (New York, NY, 2002; ISBN 0-7432-3581-9).
- Joshua M. Greene, Here Comes the Sun: The Spiritual and Musical Journey of George Harrison, John Wiley & Sons (Hoboken, NJ, 2006; ISBN 978-0-470-12780-3).
- John Harris, "A Quiet Storm", Mojo, July 2001, pp. 66–74.
- George Harrison, I Me Mine, Chronicle Books (San Francisco, CA, 2002; ISBN 0-8118-3793-9).
- Olivia Harrison, George Harrison: Living in the Material World, Abrams (New York, NY, 2011; ISBN 978-1-4197-0220-4).
- Bill Harry, The George Harrison Encyclopedia, Virgin Books (London, 2003; ISBN 978-0-7535-0822-0).
- Elliot J. Huntley, Mystical One: George Harrison – After the Break-up of the Beatles, Guernica Editions (Toronto, ON, 2006; ISBN 1-55071-197-0).
- Chris Ingham, The Rough Guide to the Beatles, Rough Guides/Penguin (London, 2006; 2nd edn; ISBN 978-1-84836-525-4).
- Ian Inglis, The Words and Music of George Harrison, Praeger (Santa Barbara, CA, 2010; ISBN 978-0-313-37532-3).
- Peter Lavezzoli, The Dawn of Indian Music in the West, Continuum (New York, NY, 2006; ISBN 0-8264-2819-3).
- Simon Leng, While My Guitar Gently Weeps: The Music of George Harrison, Hal Leonard (Milwaukee, WI, 2006; ISBN 1-4234-0609-5).
- Chip Madinger & Mark Easter, Eight Arms to Hold You: The Solo Beatles Compendium, 44.1 Productions (Chesterfield, MO, 2000; ISBN 0-615-11724-4).
- Douglas McCall, Monty Python: A Chronology, 1969–2012, McFarland (Jefferson, NC, 2014; ISBN 978-0-7864-7811-8).
- Barry Miles, The Beatles Diary Volume 1: The Beatles Years, Omnibus Press (London, 2001; ISBN 0-7119-8308-9).
- Chris O'Dell (with Katherine Ketcham), Miss O'Dell: My Hard Days and Long Nights with The Beatles, The Stones, Bob Dylan, Eric Clapton, and the Women They Loved, Touchstone (New York, NY, 2009; ISBN 978-1-4165-9093-4).
- Robert Rodriguez, Fab Four FAQ 2.0: The Beatles' Solo Years, 1970–1980, Backbeat Books (Milwaukee, WI, 2010; ISBN 978-1-4165-9093-4).
- Nicholas Schaffner, The Beatles Forever, McGraw-Hill (New York, NY, 1978; ISBN 0-07-055087-5).
- Mat Snow, The Beatles Solo: The Illustrated Chronicles of John, Paul, George, and Ringo After The Beatles (Volume 3: George), Race Point Publishing (New York, NY, 2013; ISBN 978-1-937994-26-6).
- Bruce Spizer, The Beatles Solo on Apple Records, 498 Productions (New Orleans, LA, 2005; ISBN 0-9662649-5-9).
- Gary Tillery, Working Class Mystic: A Spiritual Biography of George Harrison, Quest Books (Wheaton, IL, 2011; ISBN 978-0-8356-0900-5).
- Richie Unterberger, The Unreleased Beatles: Music & Film, Backbeat Books (San Francisco, CA, 2006; ISBN 978-0-87930-892-6).
- Bobby Whitlock (with Marc Roberty), Bobby Whitlock: A Rock 'n' Roll Autobiography, McFarland (Jefferson, NC, 2010; ISBN 978-0-7864-6190-5).
- Bob Woffinden, The Beatles Apart, Proteus (London, 1981; ISBN 0-906071-89-5).
