= Behind That Locked Door =

Song by George Harrison

from the album All Things Must Pass
- Released: 27 November 1970
- Genre: Folk rock, country
- Length: 3:05
- Label: Apple
- Songwriter: George Harrison
- Producers: George Harrison, Phil Spector

"Behind That Locked Door" is a song by English rock musician George Harrison from his 1970 triple album All Things Must Pass. Harrison wrote the song in August 1969 as a message of encouragement to Bob Dylan, who was making a highly publicised comeback to the concert stage, accompanied by the Band, with a headlining performance at the Isle of Wight Festival. "Behind That Locked Door" is a rare Harrison composition in the country music genre and the second song dealing with the friendship between himself and Dylan, after their 1968 collaboration "I'd Have You Anytime". Its lyrics address Dylan's elusive nature, and reflect the high regard in which Harrison held the American singer's work. The same reluctance on Dylan's part to re-engage with a concert audience led to him retreating again from live performance until August 1971, when he responded to Harrison's request to play at the Concert for Bangladesh.

Harrison recorded "Behind That Locked Door" in London early in the summer of 1970, shortly after taking part in a session for Dylan's New Morning album in New York. Co-produced by Phil Spector, the recording features a prominent contribution from Nashville pedal steel virtuoso Pete Drake, and twin keyboard parts from Gary Wright and Billy Preston in the tradition of the Band, whose sound influenced Harrison's arrangement. With its understated performance, the track is a comparatively rare departure from the big production commonly associated with All Things Must Pass. On release, Alan Smith of the NME described the song as "a tremendous piece of country-meets-Hawaii" and recommended that it be sent to country singer Slim Whitman "without further delay".

An alternate take of "Behind That Locked Door" appears on the 2012 Harrison compilation Early Takes: Volume 1. Olivia Newton-John, Jim James, the Felice Brothers and Norah Jones are among the artists who have covered the song.

== Background ==
In mid August 1969, Bob Dylan had confounded the media's expectations by shunning the Woodstock Festival, an event he had helped to inspire. Instead, after three years in virtual seclusion with his family, Dylan decided to make his comeback a fortnight after Woodstock, by headlining the Isle of Wight Festival at Wootton, just off the south coast of England. Now a popular act in their own right, the Band agreed to back Dylan for the performance, just as they had (as the Hawks) on his controversial 1966 world tour. In a repeat of his UK concerts from 1966, leading figures in the English music scene began to gather on the island to show their support for Dylan, the singer widely considered "the minstrel to a generation".

Alone among the many celebrity guests, (Note: Bill Wyman lists Rolling Stone bandmates Keith Richards and Charlie Watts among the rock musicians attending the festival, along with Liz Taylor, Richard Burton, Jane Fonda, Roger Vadim and Donald Cammell from the world of film, and leading figures in the Chelsea arts community such as John Dunbar, Michael Cooper and Robert Fraser.) George Harrison had spent time with Dylan during his period away from the limelight, in Bearsville, near Woodstock. In between promoting Radha Krishna Temple (London)'s debut single on Apple Records, his own production of "Hare Krishna Mantra", Harrison and wife Pattie Boyd stayed with Dylan's family at Forelands Farm, near Bembridge, during the week preceding the festival. The two musicians strengthened the bond they had established in upstate New York and were heard performing near-perfect impersonations of the Everly Brothers in the farmhouse. (Note: To the surprise of the two Apple employees who brought them, Harrison had to organise to have a set of harmonicas delivered to the farm by helicopter, since Dylan had forgotten to bring any of his own.)

Festival poster, showing an image of Dylan circa 1966

In addition to a crowd estimated at 200,000, a group of 300 American journalists descended on the Isle of Wight, adding unwelcome pressure on Dylan. In the days leading up to his performance on Sunday, 31 August, the British press dubbed the event "D Day", in reference to the Allies' invasion of German-occupied France in June 1944; in the words of music journalist John Harris, "Dylan's show had by now been inflated into the gig of the decade." As a further impediment to Dylan's planned comeback, audiences in 1969 expected to hear the rock music associated with his and the Hawks' 1965–66 tours, a style that he had abandoned with his recent country album, Nashville Skyline. This contrast was encouraged by the organisers' promotional campaign for the event, particularly in the design for the official festival posters. Referring to Dylan's more conservative 1969 image, author Clinton Heylin writes: "There was little doubt that this was a different Dylan, even if the graphic on the fluttering posters advertising the festival was a stark black-and-white shot of a beshaded Dylan in classic '66 pose." The arrival of Harrison's fellow Beatles John Lennon and Ringo Starr, on Saturday, 30 August, added to the heightened speculation that one or more members of the band might make a guest appearance with Dylan the following evening. (Note: According to festival co-promoter Ricki Farr, an "amazing" all-star jam did take place that weekend – featuring Dylan, Harrison, Lennon, Starr, Eric Clapton, Ginger Baker and Jackie Lomax – but only at the farmhouse, on Sunday afternoon. Some members, if not all five, of the Band also took part in this session.)

Harrison gifted Dylan his vintage Gibson J-200 acoustic guitar before the show and was then taken aback that Dylan arranged for "Hare Krishna Mantra" to be played over the PA before he and the Band went on stage. Mukunda Goswami, one of the six pioneer devotees who founded the Hare Krishna movement's London temple and who played on the recording, has identified this exposure as reflective of how the ancient Maha Mantra "penetrated British society" as a result of the Harrison-produced single. Harrison watched Dylan's performance from the VIP enclosure, an experience that informed the lyrics to a new composition, "Behind That Locked Door".

== Composition ==
I don't mean to embarrass Bob or anything like that, but he's said and done more, I think, than the lot of show business put together. You can take just one tune [of his] from back in the Sixties and it's more meaningful than twenty or thirty years of what everybody else said ...

— George Harrison, commenting on the songs of Bob Dylan

Harris describes "Behind That Locked Door" as a "sweet acknowledgement of Dylan's shyness". According to Harrison's recollection in a December 2000 interview for Billboard magazine, he began writing the song the night before Dylan played. Further to the statement of friendship in their 1968 collaboration "I'd Have You Anytime" – which Harrison began as a way of getting Dylan to let down his guard and "Let me in here" – in "Behind That Locked Door", he urges Dylan to confide in a friend and "let out your heart".

Author Ian Inglis notes the Isle of Wight performance as having been a "hugely important and anxious occasion" for Dylan and views Harrison's opening verse as a "personal plea" for him to "pull out of his depression, to face the world again, and to look to the future". After asking "Why are you still crying?", Harrison assures Dylan that "The love you are blessed with / This world's waiting for …"

In the second verse, Harrison sings of how he values Dylan's friendship, together with "the tales you have told me / From the things that you saw". For much of his career, Harrison repeatedly identified Dylan as one of his biggest musical influences, along with Ravi Shankar. To Inglis, these verse-two lines reflect the level of Harrison's respect for his work, since "while millions of others may look to the Beatles for guidance, he looks to Dylan". (Note: Even during what biographer Howard Sounes terms Dylan's "creative nadir" of the late 1980s, Harrison told Rolling Stone that "Five hundred years from now, looking back in history, I think he will still be the man." In 1988, Harrison voiced the opinion that their first album together as the Traveling Wilburys had to be a positive thing if it did nothing else but get Dylan interested in songwriting again.)

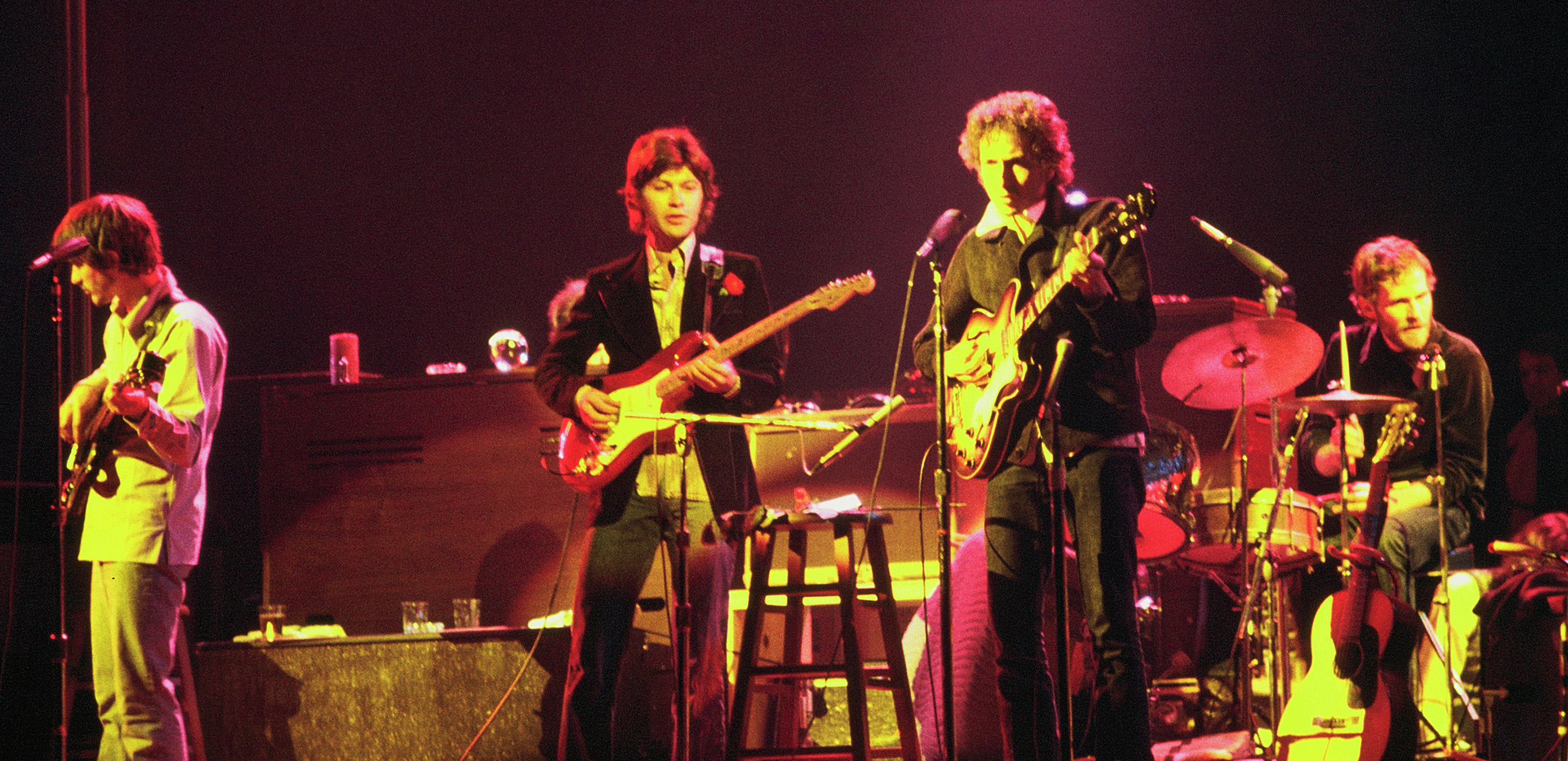
Bob Dylan and the Band on stage in 1974, the year Harrison faced criticism for his own change of musical direction

Harrison musical biographer Simon Leng observes that, in the "counseling" Harrison gives Dylan in "Behind That Locked Door", he anticipates his own "slough of despond" during 1973–75. This self-styled "naughty period" of Harrison's coincided with the failure of his marriage to Boyd and a fall from grace with music critics following his 1974 "Dark Horse Tour" – a tour on which, similar to Dylan in 1969, Harrison defied public expectation and attempted to break from his Beatle past. In the final verse to "Behind That Locked Door", he asks for Dylan's support in such a scenario:

And if ever my love goes
If I'm rich or I'm poor
Come and let out my heart, please, please
From behind that locked door.

Musically, the song is set in a slow, country-waltz time signature with, as Leng observes, melody and lyrics working "in tandem". Within each couplet, a rising musical figure presents the "problem" ("Why are you still crying?"), while the second line consists of a "falling melodic consolation" ("Your pain is now through"). In his 1980 autobiography, Harrison offers little comment about "Behind That Locked Door", aside from identifying the inspiration behind the song and admitting: "It was a good excuse to do a country tune with pedal steel guitar."

== Aftermath to the Isle of Wight Festival ==
Dylan's set at the festival was roundly viewed as anticlimactic, if not a "Midnight Flop!", in the opinion of one British tabloid. Having recently told Rolling Stone editor Jann Wenner that he would return to touring that autumn, Dylan abandoned the idea and also cancelled the proposed live album from his Isle of Wight performance. (Note: Among other projects that Dylan had considered earlier that summer, according to engineer and producer Glyn Johns' recollection in his 2014 book Sound Man, Dylan had hoped to record an album with the Beatles and the Rolling Stones. While Harrison and Keith Richards thought the idea was "fantastic", Johns writes, Paul McCartney and Mick Jagger "said absolutely not".) Showing support for Dylan in the fallout from his comeback, in a late 1969 interview, Harrison included the American singer in his personal list of essential contemporary rock artists, saying: "The Beatles, [the] Stones, Bob Dylan, Eric Clapton and Delaney & Bonnie, and that's it. Who needs anything else?"

Inglis highlights "Behind That Locked Door" as an example of how Harrison's songwriting reflects his "fondness" for family and close friends. Dylan's reluctance to perform live again was only broken by his friendship with Harrison, when the latter persuaded him to play at the Concert for Bangladesh shows in New York in August 1971. Although Dylan had been noncommittal about playing at that event until the last minute, a mutual friend of his and Harrison's, journalist Al Aronowitz, had assured Boyd, "Bob wouldn't let George down"; another performer at the shows, drummer Jim Keltner, has said that Dylan felt a special closeness towards Harrison as a result of the Concert for Bangladesh. Four years later, while Harrison was dejected following what author Elliot Huntley terms the "tsunami of bile that the Dark Horse album had unleashed", he spent considerable time with Dylan in Los Angeles. (Note: In a radio interview for WNEW-FM in April 1975, Harrison likened the critical backlash he had just received to occasions when Rolling Stone and other music publications had "tried to kill" Dylan's reputation.) According to Mukunda Goswami, speaking in a 1982 interview with Harrison, Dylan became a regular visitor to the Los Angeles Radha Krishna temple and embraced the practice of chanting.

== Recording ==
Following the Beatles' break-up in April 1970, and shortly before beginning work on All Things Must Pass, Harrison participated in a recording session in New York for Dylan's New Morning album. Among the many tracks they played were "Working on the Guru", Dylan's "gentle prod" at Harrison's association with the Hare Krishna movement, Harris writes, and "If Not for You", a new Dylan song that Harrison decided to cover on his own album. Dylan also supplied him with a phone number for Pete Drake, the Nashville-based pedal-steel guitarist and record producer whose work had graced "Lay Lady Lay" and other songs on Nashville Skyline. Harrison later praised Drake's pedal steel playing as "the bagpipes of country & western music".

Working at Abbey Road Studios in London with co-producer Phil Spector, Harrison recorded "Behind That Locked Door" during the first batch of sessions for All Things Must Pass, between late May and early June 1970. It was one of the relatively few songs on the album to use a country/folk sound, as opposed to the Wall of Sound production aesthetic typical of Spector. Drake's pedal steel features strongly on the recording, providing a commentary to Harrison's vocal in the verses, as well as a mid-song solo, supported by Hammond organ from Billy Preston, and Gary Wright on piano. The arrangement for "Behind That Locked Door" reflected the enduring influence of the Band's sound on Harrison – through the use of two keyboard players, acoustic guitars, and a restrained backing from the rhythm section, comprising Klaus Voormann on bass and, in Huntley's description, Alan White's "shuffle beat" drums. For some years after the song's release, rumours claimed that it was the Band themselves backing Harrison on the track.

Peter Frampton played acoustic guitar on the song, as he did on all the tracks recorded with Drake, although his name did not appear on the album credits. Harrison overdubbed all the backing vocals (which he credited on the album to "the George O'Hara-Smith Singers"). Spector later expressed his admiration for Harrison's willingness to "experiment upon experiment" with his harmony singing on All Things Must Pass.

== Release and reception ==
"Behind That Locked Door" was released as the third track on side two of Harrison's All Things Must Pass triple album, in November 1970. Ian Inglis writes of its position in the track order: "In the middle of an album whose songs sweep across the grand themes of history, religion, love, sex, and death, ['Behind That Locked Door'] is a surprising and touching gesture of simple friendship from one man to another." The release followed speculation in the music press regarding the Dylan–Harrison joint session in May, and conversely, the critics' lambasting of Dylan's Self Portrait double album, released in June 1970. In his review of All Things Must Pass, the NME's Alan Smith declared "Behind That Locked Door" a "standout" and "a tremendous piece of country-meets-Hawaii, which should be sent to Slim Whitman without further delay". Less impressed, Ben Gerson of Rolling Stone dismissed the song as "an inexplicable bit of C&W schlock", although he said that it had a "lovely, lilting background vocal". Later in the 1970s, Beatles Forever author Nicholas Schaffner highlighted "Behind That Locked Door" and the other Dylan-influenced songs on All Things Must Pass as being "far more intimate, both musically and lyrically, than the rest of the album".

He was a giant, a great soul, with all the humanity, all the wit and humor, all the wisdom, the spirituality, the common sense of a man and compassion for people. He inspired love and had the strength of a hundred men … The world is a profoundly emptier place without him.

— Dylan's tribute to Harrison, following the latter's death in November 2001

Reviewers and biographers in the 21st century invariably recognise its place among Bob Dylan's work on his John Wesley Harding (1967) and Nashville Skyline albums. Writing in Goldmine magazine in 2002, Dave Thompson remarked: "indeed, this tribute to Dylan's famous reticence sounds so close to a lost Zim original that His Bobness' own 'Baby, Stop Crying' (from 1978's Street Legal) is all but reduced to tributary status itself in comparison."

Author Alan Clayson approves of the more "understated production aesthetic" next to what he views as an at-times "bloated" sound found elsewhere on All Things Must Pass. Simon Leng also acknowledges Harrison's success in "temper[ing] Phil Spector's taste for the extreme" and describes "Behind That Locked Door" as one of its composer's "more attractive" songs, with a fine lead vocal. "[It] is refreshing to hear Harrison singing about another's pain," Leng adds, "suggesting that, unlike some of his contemporaries, he was able to displace himself as the center of his universe for a moment or two at least." In his book Phil Spector: Out of His Head, Richard Williams identifies "Behind That Locked Door" as an example of "how sympathetic to the performer" Spector could be as a producer, in this case, by giving the recording a "mellow, autumnal mix" that "beautifully display[s]" Drake's pedal steel.

Elliot Huntley writes that the track provides a showcase for Harrison's "melodic flair", as well as a reason to wonder why the ex-Beatle did not record more songs in the country-music genre, since "certainly he seems perfectly at home in these comfortable surroundings". Huntley speculates on the "interesting" possibility of a whole LP side of similar "ersatz country and western" tracks, as the Rolling Stones would do on their Exile on Main St. double album in 1972. Harrison biographer Joshua Greene describes the song as a celebration of "love's victory over pain". Music historian Andrew Grant Jackson includes the song, along with ten other All Things Must Pass tracks, in his 2012 book Still the Greatest: The Essential Solo Beatles Songs. He admires the interplay between pedal steel and organ, and comments that with his 1970 triple album, Harrison was effectively escaping "that locked door" himself, since: "He was the Dave Grohl of his day, rising from the ashes of a group in which he was a secondary member to dominate the charts with statements he could never have made from within his former band."

In 2015, "Behind That Locked Door" was included on the album Dylan, Cash, and the Nashville Cats: A New Music City, released to accompany the similarly titled exhibition at the Country Music Hall of Fame. Commenting on the track's sequencing before Starr's "Beaucoups of Blues", Jamie Parmenter of Renowned for Sound writes that "George's sweet harmonies and insightful lyrics sit pleasantly against Ringo's upbeat tempo song of love and retribution, and actually create a sense of togetherness when heard next to each other."

== Alternative version ==
In November 2011, an early take of "Behind That Locked Door", featuring Harrison's vocal backed by just two acoustic guitars and Drake's pedal steel, was included in the British deluxe-edition CD/DVD release of Martin Scorsese's Living in the Material World documentary. This version appeared worldwide on the Early Takes: Volume 1 compilation in May 2012. Giles Martin, who went through Harrison's musical archive at Friar Park while compiling the album, notes the "folk-tinged spoken word quality" of Harrison's singing on this take, an example of "a kind of conversational intimacy" that he brought to his recordings.

Rolling Stone critic David Fricke describes this version of the song as a "sweet Nashville reading". Andy Gill of The Independent found it a "particularly engaging" inclusion on a compilation that allows "the sweeter side of George Harrison's character to shine unencumbered by studio blandishments".

== Cover versions ==
Among the country artists who covered the song, Olivia Newton-John released a version on her 1972 album Olivia, which also includes her recording of the All Things Must Pass track "What Is Life". (Note: Newton-John thereby recorded all of the first three songs on side three of All Things Must Pass over 1971–72. In addition to achieving a UK top 20 hit with "What Is Life", her first hit single was a 1971 version of "If Not for You", based on Harrison's arrangement.) Drake himself recorded "Behind That Locked Door", as well as Harrison's "Isn't It a Pity" and "Something", although the recordings remained unissued until the release of the Pete Drake album, nine years after his death in July 1988. Christian alt rock band the Choir covered the song on their 1989 album Wide-Eyed Wonder.

Following Harrison's death in November 2001, Jim James recorded "Behind That Locked Door" for what became a six-song Harrison covers EP, released as Tribute To in August 2009. Summer Hymns included the song on their 2004 album Value Series, Vol. 1: Fool's Gold, a recording that Uncut's reviewer deemed "the finest George Harrison cover ever ... all marshmallow limbs in zero-gravity limbo". Sam Ubl of Pitchfork commented on Summer Hymns' progression towards country rock and described "Behind That Locked Door" as an "ideal song" for the band, adding that their interpretation is "warmly rife with gilt pedal steel and [Zachary] Gresham's understated yet moving vocals".

Tying in with the release of Scorsese's George Harrison: Living in the Material World, a version by the Felice Brothers appeared on the multi-artist tribute Harrison Covered, a CD accompanying the November 2011 issue of Mojo magazine. Singer Norah Jones performed "Behind That Locked Door" on the TBS television show Conan on 25 September 2014. Her appearance was part of the show's "George Harrison Week", celebrating the release of the Harrison box set The Apple Years 1968–75.

== Personnel ==
The musicians who performed on "Behind That Locked Door" are believed to be as follows:

- George Harrison – vocals, acoustic guitars, backing vocals
- Peter Frampton – acoustic guitar
- Pete Drake – pedal steel
- Klaus Voormann – bass guitar
- Gary Wright – piano
- Billy Preston – organ
- Alan White – drums

== Sources ==
- Keith Badman, The Beatles Diary Volume 2: After the Break-Up 1970–2001, Omnibus Press (London, 2001; ISBN 0-7119-8307-0).
- Harry Castleman & Walter J. Podrazik, All Together Now: The First Complete Beatles Discography 1961–1975, Ballantine Books (New York, NY, 1976; ISBN 0-345-25680-8).
- Chant and Be Happy: The Power of Mantra Meditation, Bhaktivedanta Book Trust (Los Angeles, CA, 1997; ISBN 978-0-89213-118-1).
- Alan Clayson, George Harrison, Sanctuary (London, 2003; ISBN 1-86074-489-3).
- Graham Dwyer & Richard J. Cole (eds), The Hare Krishna Movement: Forty Years of Chant and Change, I.B. Tauris (London, 2007; ISBN 1-84511-407-8).
- The Editors of Rolling Stone, Harrison, Rolling Stone Press/Simon & Schuster (New York, NY, 2002; ISBN 0-7432-3581-9).
- Joshua M. Greene, Here Comes the Sun: The Spiritual and Musical Journey of George Harrison, John Wiley & Sons (Hoboken, NJ, 2006; ISBN 978-0-470-12780-3).
- John Harris, "A Quiet Storm", Mojo, July 2001, pp. 66–74.
- George Harrison, I Me Mine, Chronicle Books (San Francisco, CA, 2002; ISBN 0-8118-3793-9).
- Olivia Harrison, George Harrison: Living in the Material World, Abrams (New York, NY, 2011; ISBN 978-1-4197-0220-4).
- Bill Harry, The George Harrison Encyclopedia, Virgin Books (London, 2003; ISBN 978-0-7535-0822-0).
- Levon Helm with Stephen Davis, This Wheel's on Fire: Levon Helm and the Story of The Band, A Cappella Books (Chicago, IL, 2000; ISBN 978-1-55652-405-9).
- Clinton Heylin, Bob Dylan: Behind the Shades (20th Anniversary Edition), Faber and Faber (London, 2011; ISBN 978-0-571-27240-2).
- Elliot J. Huntley, Mystical One: George Harrison – After the Break-up of the Beatles, Guernica Editions (Toronto, ON, 2006; ISBN 1-55071-197-0).
- Ian Inglis, The Words and Music of George Harrison, Praeger (Santa Barbara, CA, 2010; ISBN 978-0-313-37532-3).
- Andrew Grant Jackson, Still the Greatest: The Essential Solo Beatles Songs, Scarecrow Press (Lanham, MD, 2012; ISBN 978-0-8108-8222-5).
- Ashley Kahn (ed.), George Harrison on George Harrison: Interviews and Encounters, Chicago Review Press (Chicago, IL, 2020; ISBN 978-1-64160-051-4).
- Peter Lavezzoli, The Dawn of Indian Music in the West, Continuum (New York, NY, 2006; ISBN 0-8264-2819-3).
- Simon Leng, While My Guitar Gently Weeps: The Music of George Harrison, Hal Leonard (Milwaukee, WI, 2006; ISBN 1-4234-0609-5).
- Chip Madinger & Mark Easter, Eight Arms to Hold You: The Solo Beatles Compendium, 44.1 Productions (Chesterfield, MO, 2000; ISBN 0-615-11724-4).
- Barry Miles, The Beatles Diary Volume 1: The Beatles Years, Omnibus Press (London, 2001; ISBN 0-7119-8308-9).
- Chris O'Dell with Katherine Ketcham, Miss O'Dell: My Hard Days and Long Nights with The Beatles, The Stones, Bob Dylan, Eric Clapton, and the Women They Loved, Touchstone (New York, NY, 2009; ISBN 978-1-4165-9093-4).
- Nicholas Schaffner, The Beatles Forever, McGraw-Hill (New York, NY, 1978; ISBN 0-07-055087-5).
- Howard Sounes, Down the Highway: The Life of Bob Dylan, Doubleday (London, 2001; ISBN 0-385-60125-5).
- Bruce Spizer, The Beatles Solo on Apple Records, 498 Productions (New Orleans, LA, 2005; ISBN 0-9662649-5-9).
- Nick Talevski, The Encyclopedia of Rock Obituaries, Omnibus Press (London, 1999; ISBN 0-7119-7548-5).
- Gary Tillery, Working Class Mystic: A Spiritual Biography of George Harrison, Quest Books (Wheaton, IL, 2011; ISBN 978-0-8356-0900-5).
- Richard Williams, Phil Spector: Out of His Head, Omnibus Press (London, 2003; ISBN 978-0-7119-9864-3).
- Bill Wyman, Rolling with the Stones, Dorling Kindersley (London, 2002; ISBN 0-7513-4646-2).
