= Regions of Light and Sound of God =

Studio album by Jim James
- Released: 5 February 2013
- Genres: Indie rock, psychedelic rock, alternative rock
- Length: 38:24
- Label: ATO
- Producer: Jim James

Jim James chronology
Tribute To (2009)	Regions of Light and Sound of God (2013)	Eternally Even (2016)

Singles from Regions of Light and Sound of God
- 1. "Know Til Now" Released: 13 November 2012

Professional ratings
Aggregate scores
Source	Rating
Metacritic	79/100
Review scores
Source	Rating
AllMusic	3.5/5 stars
Consequence of Sound	4/5 stars
The Independent	4/5 stars
The Observer	4/5 stars
Rolling Stone	3.5/5 stars
Slant	3.5/5 stars
Pitchfork	7.8/10
Paste Magazine	8.3/10
The A.V. Club	C+

Regions of Light and Sound of God is the debut solo album by My Morning Jacket frontman Jim James, first released on February 5, 2013.

== Title ==
The name of the album comes from Lynd Ward's 1929 wordless novel Gods' Man, which was given to James while he was considering recording a solo album.

== Reception ==
Regions of Light and Sound of God debuted at No. 34 on the Billboard 200, and No. 10 on the Top Rock Albums, selling 17,000 copies in the first week. The album has sold 56,000 copies in the United States as of November 2016.

== Track listing ==
No.	Title	Length
1.	"State of the Art (A.E.I.O.U.)"	5:17
2.	"Know Til Now"	6:26
3.	"Dear One"	3:10
4.	"A New Life"	4:28
5.	"Exploding"	2:00
6.	"Of the Mother Again"	3:53
7.	"Actress"	4:38
8.	"All Is Forgiven"	4:56
9.	"God's Love to Deliver"	3:36

== Personnel ==
- Jim James - Composer, Producer, Engineering, Vocals, Guitar, Keyboards, Bass, Drums, Various Instruments
- Jenice Heo - Art Direction
- Gary Burden - Art Direction
- Carl Broemel - Cover Photo
- David Givan - Drums on tracks 1, 2, 4, 6, 8, 9
- Emily Hagihara - Percussion
- Rick Kwan - Mixing
- Bob Ludwig - Mastering
- Tucker Martine - Engineer
- Adriana Molello - Strings
- Scott Moore - Strings
- Kevin Ratterman - Mixing assistant
- Ben Sollee - Strings
- Knaht Voy Yilom - Photography
- "Of the Mother Again" contains a sample of "Fat Dog" by Dr. Dog

== Charts ==
Chart (2013)	Peak position
US Billboard 200	34
US Alternative Albums (Billboard)	8
US Independent Albums (Billboard)	7
US Top Rock Albums (Billboard)	10
US Tastemaker Albums (Billboard)	1
US Vinyl Albums (Billboard)	1
