= Dylan, Cash, and the Nashville Cats: A New Music City =

Compilation album by Various Artists
- Released: June 16, 2015
- Label: Legacy Recordings, CMF

Professional ratings
Review scores
Source	Rating
AllMusic	4.5/5 stars
Pitchfork	7.7/10

Dylan, Cash, and the Nashville Cats: A New Music City is a multi-artist compilation album released in June 2015 by Legacy Recordings and the Country Music Hall of Fame and Museum's CMF label. It accompanied the Country Music Hall of Fame's exhibition of the same name, which opened in Nashville in March 2015 and documented the overlapping influence between country music and rock music during the 1960s and 1970s.

The two-disc album includes a previously unreleased version of Bob Dylan's 1970 song "If Not for You" with Lloyd Green on pedal steel guitar. The booklet accompanying the physical release contains notes on the 36 tracks and an introduction by Tracy Nelson.

== Track listing ==
Disc 1
No.	Title	Performer(s)	Length
1.	"Absolutely Sweet Marie"	Bob Dylan
2.	"Harpoon Man"	Charlie McCoy and the Escorts
3.	"It Ain't Me, Babe"	Johnny Cash
4.	"Down in the Flood"	Flatt & Scruggs
5.	"The Way I Feel"	Gordon Lightfoot
6.	"I'll Be Your Baby Tonight"	Bob Dylan
7.	"You Ain't Goin' Nowhere"	The Byrds
8.	"This Wheel's on Fire"	Ian & Sylvia
9.	"Gentle on My Mind"	John Hartford
10.	"Some of Shelly's Blues"	The Monkees
11.	"Turn Around"	The Beau Brummels
12.	"I'm So Lonesome I Could Cry"	Tracy Nelson
13.	"If You Don't Like Hank Williams (1968 Demo)"	Kris Kristofferson
14.	"Bird on the Wire"	Leonard Cohen
15.	"Hickory Wind"	The Byrds
16.	"Blowing Down That Dusty Road"	Country Joe McDonald
17.	"The Boxer"	Simon & Garfunkel
18.	"Stone Fox Chase"	Area Code 615
19.	"The Byrds Sweetheart of the Rodeo Radio Ad (Bonus Track)"

Disc 2
No.	Title	Performer(s)	Length
1.	"Girl from the North Country"	Bob Dylan with Johnny Cash
2.	"Driftin' Way of Life"	Jerry Jeff Walker
3.	"Behind That Locked Door"	George Harrison
4.	"Crazy Mama"	J.J. Cale
5.	"Beaucoups of Blues"	Ringo Starr
6.	"Going to the Country"	Steve Miller Band
7.	"Heart of Gold"	Neil Young
8.	"If Not for You (Previously Unreleased Version)"	Bob Dylan with Lloyd Green
9.	"City of New Orleans"	Steve Goodman
10.	"The Night They Drove Old Dixie Down"	Joan Baez
11.	"Blue River"	Eric Andersen
12.	"Seven Bridges Road (1972 Nashville Version)"	Steve Young
13.	"Will the Circle Be Unbroken"	Nitty Gritty Dirt Band
14.	"Sally G"	Paul McCartney and Wings
15.	"Silver Wings"	Earl Scruggs with Linda Ronstadt
16.	"A Six Pack to Go"	Hank Wilson
17.	"Matchbox (Live on The Johnny Cash Show)"	Derek and the Dominos with Johnny Cash and Carl Perkins
