= Eternally Even =

Studio album by Jim James
- Released: November 4, 2016
- Genres: Indie rock; psychedelic soul; trip hop
- Length: 41:26
- Labels: ATO; Capitol
- Producers: Jim James; Blake Mills

Jim James chronology
Regions of Light and Sound of God (2013)	Eternally Even (2016)	Tribute To 2 (2017)

Singles from Eternally Even
- 1. "Same Old Lie" Released: 23 September 2016

Eternally Even is the second solo album by My Morning Jacket frontman Jim James, first available as an advance stream on NPR First Listen on October 27 and released on November 4, 2016.

== Track listing ==
All tracks are written by James Edward Olliges Jr.

No.	Title	Length
1.	"Hide in Plain Sight"	5:09
2.	"Same Old Lie"	5:55
3.	"Here in Spirit" (Written with Eric D. Johnson)	4:16
4.	"The World's Smiling Now" (Written with Leonard Sanders)	4:53
5.	"We Ain't Getting Any Younger Pt. 1"	6:27
6.	"We Ain't Getting Any Younger Pt. 2"	3:05
7.	"True Nature"	3:41
8.	"In the Moment"	4:09
9.	"Eternally Even"	3:53

== Reception ==
Professional ratings
Aggregate scores
Source	Rating
Metacritic	78/100
Review scores
Source	Rating
All About Jazz	3/5 stars
AllMusic	4/5 stars
Consequence	C+
Exclaim!	8/10
The Independent	4/5 stars
Paste	7.2/10
Pitchfork	7.9/10
Rolling Stone	3.5/5 stars
Slant Magazine	4/5 stars
Under the Radar	8/10

Rolling Stone gave the album 3.5 out of 5 stars.

== Personnel ==
Adapted from All About Jazz.

- Jim James - vocals, bass, guitar, keyboards, organ, programming, synthesizer
- Chris "Daddy" Dave - drums, percussion
- David Stephen Givan - drums, percussion
- Shungudzo Kuyimba - vocals
- Joseph Lorge - background vocals
- Blake Mills - bass, drums, synthesizer
- Rob Moose - strings, synthesizer
- Kevin Ratterman - programming, synthesizer
- Brian Reitzell - drums
- Joan Shelley - vocals

== Charts ==
Chart (2016)	Peak position
US Billboard 200	116
US Alternative Albums (Billboard)	7
US Americana/Folk Albums (Billboard)	3
US Top Rock Albums (Billboard)	12
