= I'd Have You Anytime =

Song by George Harrison

from the album All Things Must Pass
- Released: 27 November 1970
- Genre: Folk rock
- Length: 2:56
- Label: Apple
- Songwriters: George Harrison, Bob Dylan
- Producers: George Harrison, Phil Spector

"I'd Have You Anytime" is a song written by George Harrison and Bob Dylan, released in 1970 as the opening track of Harrison's first post-Beatles solo album, All Things Must Pass. The pair wrote the song at Dylan's home in Bearsville, near Woodstock in upstate New York, in November 1968. Its creation occurred during a period when Harrison had outgrown his role in the Beatles and Dylan had withdrawn from the pressures of fame to raise a family. "I'd Have You Anytime" is recognised as a statement of friendship between the two musicians, whose meetings from 1964 onwards resulted in changes in musical direction for both Dylan and the Beatles. The song reflects the environment in which it was written, as Harrison's verses urge the shy and elusive Dylan to let down his guard, and the Dylan-composed choruses respond with a message of welcome.

As a gentle ballad, "I'd Have You Anytime" went against pop-music convention of the time for an album opener. The recording was co-produced by Phil Spector in London and features a lead guitar part by Eric Clapton. With the strong public association that existed between Harrison and Dylan by 1970, some music critics remarked on the American singer's presence on All Things Must Pass, even though he did not contribute to the album as a performer. Harrison and Dylan went on to enjoy further collaborations after writing the song, culminating in their recording together as members of the Traveling Wilburys in 1988–90.

An alternate take of "I'd Have You Anytime", recorded during the All Things Must Pass sessions, appears on the 2012 Harrison compilation Early Takes: Volume 1. Harrison and Dylan's demo of the song circulates on bootleg compilations, but it has never received an official release. Ralfi Pagán and Evan Rachel Wood are among the artists who have covered "I'd Have You Anytime".

== Background ==
I was with Dylan at a party when he said to Mick Jagger, "Are you serious about what you write and play and sing? You can't be serious about your music." ... That gave me a handle on what happened to George [in the Beatles]. People who knew Bob would get this feeling, "Take everything I've done and throw it out and let me start over again."

— Photographer Barry Feinstein, commenting on Bob Dylan's influence on George Harrison and other musicians in the 1960s

Bob Dylan first met the Beatles in New York City in August 1964, at the height of the band's fame. The meeting was arranged by New York journalist Al Aronowitz, who later remarked on the significance of this introduction: "Hasn't the whole world benefited? ... The Beatles' magic was in their sound. Bob's magic was in his words. After they met, the Beatles' words got grittier, and Bob invented folk-rock." Author Gary Tillery has written of the connection established between Dylan and George Harrison: "Dylan was particularly keen on meeting [John] Lennon, the writer-artist-intellectual of the group, but the deepest and longest-lasting bond begun that night was with George Harrison. Their two reclusive personalities meshed ..."

The connection developed in May 1966, when Harrison, Lennon and Paul McCartney visited Dylan in his London hotel, midway through his controversial world tour with backing band the Hawks. According to musicologist Ian MacDonald, Dylan's relationship with Lennon was a testy, competitive one at times, and Dylan was "cooler" towards McCartney, whose best-known songs he regarded as "sell-outs to soft pop"; but in producer Bob Johnston's estimation, Lennon, Harrison and McCartney entered the hotel suite as members of the Beatles and departed as three distinct individuals, such was Dylan's philosophical influence on fellow songwriters at the time. Following his creative peak in mid 1966 with the Blonde on Blonde double album, Dylan retired to Bearsville, New York, accompanied by the Hawks (soon to become the Band), in order to recuperate from a motorcycle crash and raise a family with his wife, Sara Lownds. Little was heard from him throughout 1967–68, a situation that added to his mystique as music critics and fans awaited his return. Commenting on "I'd Have You Anytime" in 1976, Harrison said that two statements in Dylan's Blonde on Blonde track "Stuck Inside of Mobile with the Memphis Blues Again" had especially resonated with him: "what price you have to pay to get out of / Going through all these things twice" and "Oh mama, can this really be the end".

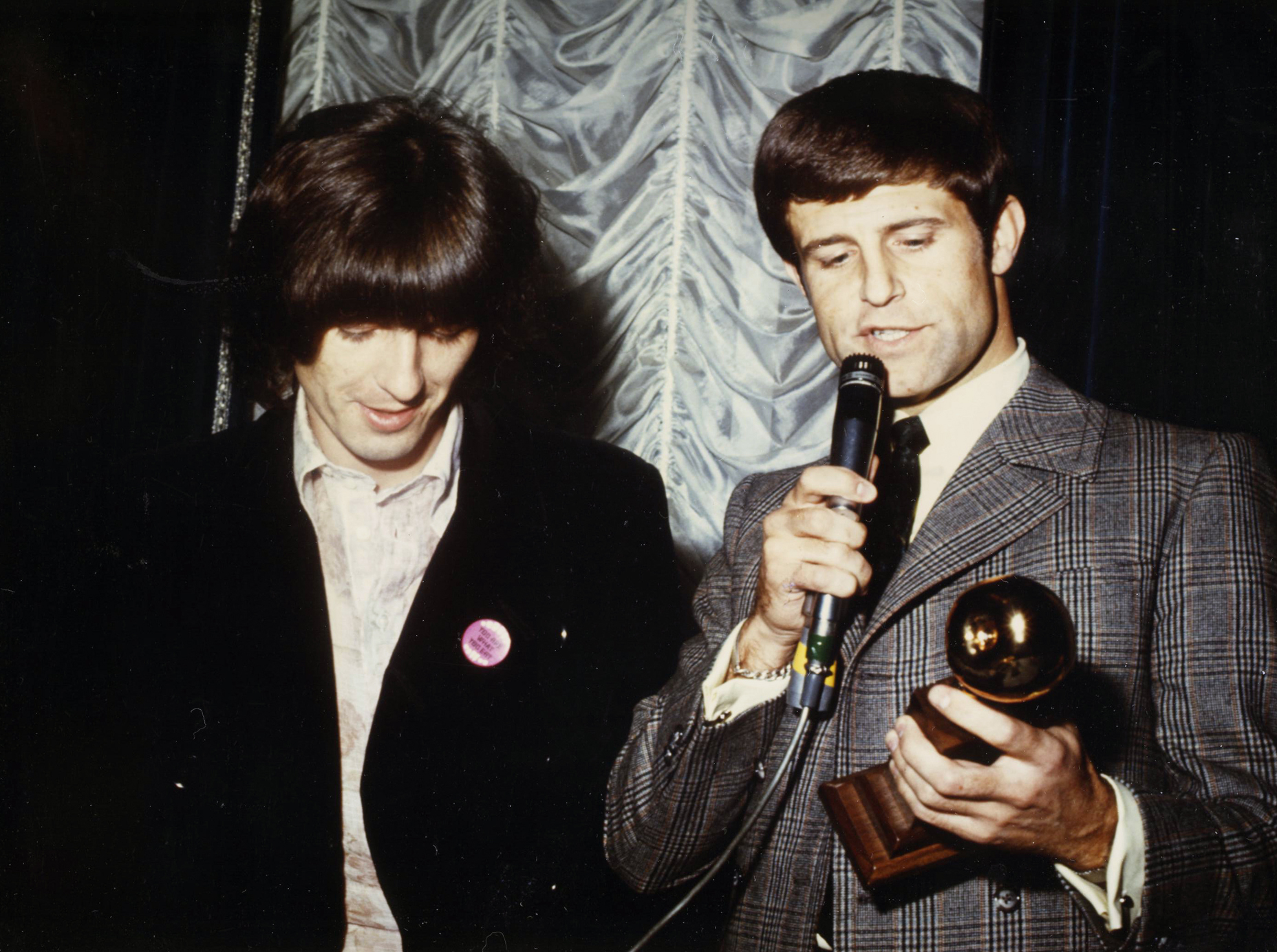
Harrison (left, with Don Grierson), in Los Angeles in October 1968

While Dylan was dismissive of the Beatles' landmark album Sgt. Pepper's Lonely Hearts Club Band (1967), Harrison remained an avowed fan of Dylan's work – Blonde on Blonde being the only Western music that Harrison took with him to India in February 1968. (Note: Although not as imitative of the American singer's style as Lennon had been in 1964–65, Harrison's compositions for the Beatles showed a marked Dylan influence in the case of "Think for Yourself", from Rubber Soul (1965), and "Long, Long, Long", from the White Album (1968).) Following the sessions for the Beatles' White Album, Harrison worked in Los Angeles for much of October and November 1968, producing the debut solo album by Jackie Lomax, one of the first signings to the Beatles' Apple record label. Harrison and his wife, Pattie Boyd, then spent Thanksgiving with the Dylans while staying in the Catskills as guests of manager Albert Grossman. Despite Dylan's excitement at their arrival, Harrison found him withdrawn and seemingly lacking in confidence. (Note: In a 1987 interview with Musician magazine, Harrison recalled that a "crisis" in the relationship between Dylan and his manager was a factor. He added: "I would spend the day with Bob and the night with Grossman and hear both sides of the battle.") Music journalist John Harris comments that, unlike in their previous meetings, "there were no hangers-on [this time], Dylan's head was clear, and the protective barriers of cool could come down – which, eventually, they did." On the third day, Harrison recalls in his 1980 autobiography, I, Me, Mine, "we got the guitars out and then things loosened up".

== Composition ==
The year 1968 marked the start of what Dylan himself later termed his "amnesia", referring to a form of writer's block he experienced post-John Wesley Harding (1967), when painting had replaced songwriting as his preferred creative outlet. Well known for his unsophisticated musical approach, particularly in comparison to Harrison's broader "harmonic palette", author Simon Leng suggests, Dylan was now eager to learn some more-advanced chords. Harrison began demonstrating various major seventh, diminished and augmented chord shapes – "all these funny chords people showed me when I was a kid", as he later put it. While playing a G major 7 chord and taking the shape up the guitar neck to B♭ major 7, Harrison realised, "Ah, this sounds like a tune here ..." Keen to break down the barriers that Dylan had imposed, Harrison came up with the song's opening lines:

Let me in here
I know I've been here
Let me into your heart …

I was saying to him "write me some words", and thinking of all this: Johnnie's in the basement, mixing up the medicine, type of thing, and he was saying, "show me some chords, how do you get those tunes?"

— Harrison, on writing "I'd Have You Anytime" with Dylan

At the same time, he was pushing Dylan to come up with some words of his own. (Note: In his 1987 Musician interview, Harrison emphasised the conversational aspect of this writing session, saying: "Understand, I sang that opening lyric off the top of my head to try to communicate with him …") Dylan duly supplied a rejoinder, in the form of the song's bridge-chorus:

All I have is yours
All you see is mine
And I'm glad to hold you in my arms
I'd have you anytime.

"Beautiful! – and that was that", Harrison concludes in I, Me, Mine. He subsequently finished the composition alone.

The lyrics reflect an approach regarding demonstrating love for his close friends that Harrison's widow Olivia has described as "very unabashed, quite romantic in a sense", as well as a view expressed by Tom Petty, a fellow Traveling Wilbury with Harrison and Dylan in 1988–90, that Harrison was able to probe the notoriously elusive Dylan in a way that few others could. Author Ian Inglis views "I'd Have You Anytime" as working as a straightforward love song, with Harrison's "Let me into your heart" serving as "not a desperate plea but a reassuring conversation", and Dylan's "All I have is yours / All you see is mine" providing the same "element of reciprocity that distinguished the declaration of love" in Harrison's song "Something".

== Aftermath to Thanksgiving 1968 ==
In his Harrison biography, Here Comes the Sun, Joshua Greene notes the effect that this time with Dylan and the Band had on Harrison, with regard to his growing dissatisfaction as a Beatle. "Like Dylan, George was beginning to see that his next step needed to be away from everything he had done up to that moment", Greene writes. "Watching Dylan over Thanksgiving ... showed George how happy someone could be following his own direction and making his own rules." In his essay for Mojo magazine covering Harrison's 1970 solo release, All Things Must Pass, John Harris identifies this time in Woodstock as the beginning of Harrison's "journey" to making the album. (Note: Following this US visit, Harrison returned to London for what he later called "the winter of discontent in The Beatles" – namely, the Get Back film project. Harrison walked out on the band on 10 January 1969, the seventh day of filming; although he soon returned, Harrison only "nominally" remained a Beatle, according to Harris, and was otherwise "serving out his notice".)

Harrison and Dylan wrote at least one other song together during Thanksgiving 1968: "When Everybody Comes to Town", subsequently renamed "Nowhere to Go". Dylan also showed Harrison "I Don't Want to Do It", which, like "Nowhere to Go", Harrison would later consider for inclusion on All Things Must Pass but discard. (Note: Harrison revisited "I Don't Want to Do It" in the early 1980s, taping a home demo of the song at Friar Park, but he did not record it professionally until November 1984. This latter version received what John Harris terms the "dubious honour" of being released on the Porky's Revenge! film soundtrack in 1985.) As for Dylan's future output, songs such as "I Threw It All Away" on Nashville Skyline (1969) showed a more complex musical structure than before, a departure from his usual three-chord compositions. Harrison recalled hearing "I Threw It All Away" during the 1968 visit and welcoming the vulnerability in Dylan's lyrics, even though he suspected that it would alienate listeners used to the singer's unsentimental image.

The next meet-up between Harrison and Dylan occurred in August 1969, when the latter was in England to appear at the Isle of Wight Festival with the Band. Harrison wrote "Behind That Locked Door" at that time – a song that Harris describes as "a sweet acknowledgement of Dylan's shyness". In its review of the Beatles' Abbey Road album (1969), Time magazine highlighted "Something" as the best track and identified Harrison's time with Dylan as having "helped him achieve a new confidence in his own musical personality" beside the traditionally more dominant Lennon and McCartney. During the same period, according to engineer and producer Glyn Johns' recollection in his book Sound Man (2014), Dylan expressed an interest in recording an album with the Beatles and the Rolling Stones. Harrison and Keith Richards were enamoured of the idea, Johns continues, but McCartney and Mick Jagger "both said absolutely not".

== Recording ==
Simon Leng describes Harrison's various musical activities outside the Beatles during 1968–70 as a "three-year busman's holiday", which came to an end once McCartney announced his departure from the band on 10 April 1970. Before beginning work on All Things Must Pass with co-producer Phil Spector, Harrison attended a session for Dylan's New Morning album in New York City, on 1 May. With backing from Charlie Daniels and Russ Kunkel, Dylan and Harrison recorded a version of "If Not for You", a new song of Dylan's that Harrison subsequently covered on All Things Must Pass, and two tracks that appear on New Morning: "Went to See the Gypsy" and "Day of the Locusts". (Note: Harrison's New York visit was ostensibly a business trip, to allow him to see Apple Records' new offices at 1700 Broadway. Due to the terms of his visa, Harrison was therefore ineligible for a musician's credit on Dylan's album.) Although it was not a song they played at Columbia's Studio B that day, Harrison and Dylan recorded a demo of "I'd Have You Anytime" during a jam session held at Dylan's Greenwich Village townhouse on 30 April, with Kunkel accompanying them on bongos. The song was one of many tracks that Harrison had already shortlisted for his own album, recording for which began at London's Abbey Road Studios in late May.

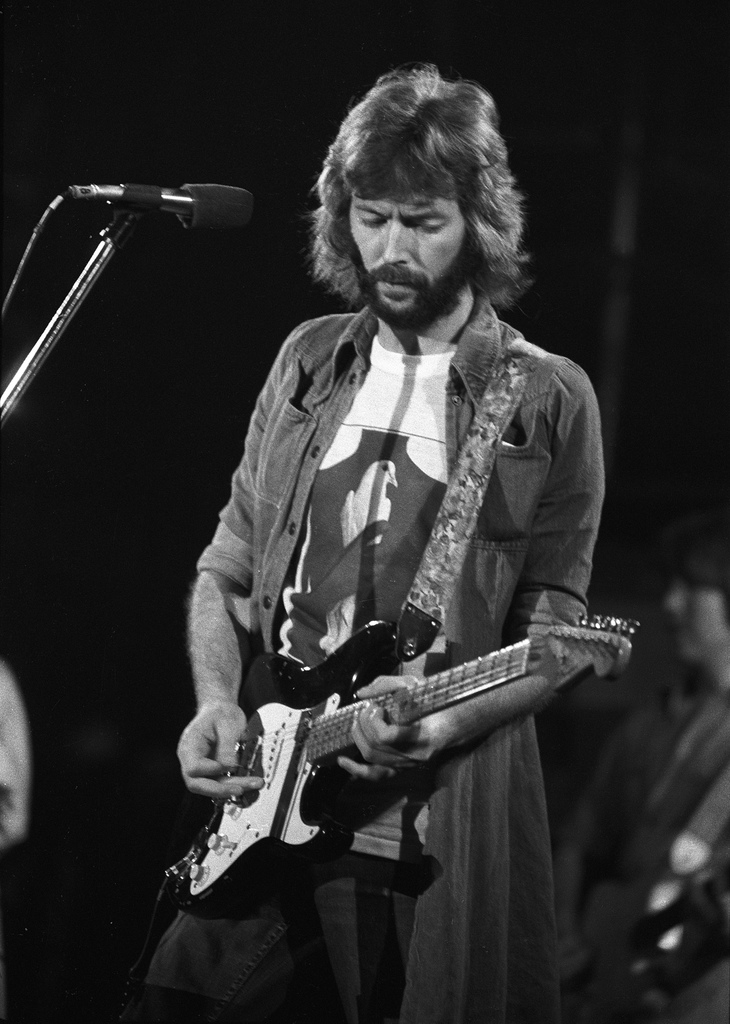
Eric Clapton (shown performing in 1975) played the lead guitar part on the recording.

The released recording of "I'd Have You Anytime" features a sparse musical arrangement, in what Leng terms the "minimalist" tradition of Dylan and the Band, similar to the treatment given to "Behind That Locked Door", "Run of the Mill" and "If Not for You". Harrison played acoustic guitar on the song, while Eric Clapton contributed an electric guitar part that author Bruce Spizer describes as "exquisite". Leng views Clapton's solos as "all but mimicking" Harrison's playing on the Beatles' "Something".

As with several of the tracks on All Things Must Pass, the remaining musician credits have traditionally been the subject of some conjecture. After consulting German musician Klaus Voormann and orchestral arranger John Barham, Leng credits the rhythm section on "I'd Have You Anytime" as being Voormann (on bass) and Alan White (drums). According to Spizer also, the overdubbed vibraphone (often referred to as a xylophone) was played by either White or Barham, who had first collaborated with Harrison on the latter's Wonderwall Music film soundtrack (1968). While Leng and Spizer credit Barham with a string arrangement on "I'd Have You Anytime", American musician Bobby Whitlock writes in his 2010 autobiography that the sound was a harmonium, which he himself often played during sessions for the album. (Note: By Leng's admission, his track-by-track musician credits are "more indicative than authoritative". The same ambient instrument appears on the Early Takes version of "I'd Have You Anytime", which is a basic track – recorded live and before any overdubs such as orchestration – accompanied by Harrison's guide vocal.) In Whitlock's recollection, the personnel supporting Harrison on the recording were the future line-up of Derek and the Dominos: Clapton, Carl Radle on bass, Jim Gordon on drums, and Whitlock on harmonium. (Note: White's recollections similarly do not tally with Leng's findings, the only track on which they agree he contributes being "If Not for You".)

== Release and reception ==
It just seemed like a good thing to do [to open the album with "I'd Have You Anytime"] … maybe subconsciously I needed a bit of support. I had Eric playing the solo, and Bob had helped write it …

— Harrison to music journalist Timothy White, December 2000

Defying pop convention – as the Band's Music from Big Pink had in July 1968, by opening with the funereal "Tears of Rage" – Harrison selected the slow, gentle "I'd Have You Anytime" as track 1 on All Things Must Pass, which was released on Apple Records in late November 1970. He later attributed the message behind its opening line, "Let me in here", as his motivation for placing the song first in the running order, along with the confidence engendered by Dylan and Clapton's involvement. In a 1976 interview, when asked what his favourite song on All Things Must Pass was, Harrison mentioned "I'd Have You Anytime" for the collaboration with Dylan and "particularly the recording".

From mid 1970, the association between Harrison and Dylan had created much speculation in the music press, their New York session on 1 May having been hyped up as a "monster" recording marathon in the months since. Critics were still awaiting Dylan's return to artistic eminence after two albums, Nashville Skyline and the recent Self Portrait, that had caused confusion in rock-music circles. Dylan's influence on All Things Must Pass was detectable "at a number of levels", Ian Inglis writes; in their 1975 book The Beatles: An Illustrated Record, Roy Carr and Tony Tyler described Dylan as a "phantom presence" on Harrison's album, while author Robert Rodriguez labels him an "unmistakable specter". On release, with regard to "I'd Have You Anytime", Rolling Stone's Ben Gerson opined that "the two together don't come up with much". More impressed, Alan Smith of the NME described the song as "wistful and touching". In his 1977 book The Beatles Forever, Nicholas Schaffner also wrote of Dylan's presence being "strongly felt … in spirit if not in person". Schaffner viewed the "Dylanesque numbers" as "somewhat overshadowed" by those with the obvious Spector Wall of Sound production qualities, but identified songs such as "I'd Have You Anytime", "If Not for You" and "Behind That Locked Door" as being "far more intimate, both musically and lyrically, than the rest of the album".

According to Dave Herman in a 1975 interview with Harrison for WNEW-FM, he was one of the very few musicians to co-write with Dylan; Herman named the Band's Robbie Robertson and Rick Danko as the others. In subsequent decades, following their work together in the Traveling Wilburys, the Harrison–Dylan connection has attracted less scrutiny. Writing in Rolling Stone in 2002, Mikal Gilmore described "I'd Have You Anytime" and "If Not for You" as "surprisingly beautiful", while Richie Unterberger of AllMusic lists "I'd Have You Anytime" as one of five "track picks" on an album where "nearly every song is excellent". Writing for the music website Something Else!, Nick DeRiso rates "I'd Have You Anytime" among the highlights of Harrison's solo career on Apple Records. DeRiso describes the track as "[e]very bit as moving as Abbey Road triumphs like 'Something'" and "a gutsy opening song for such an enormous undertaking". In The Rough Guide to the Beatles, Chris Ingham opines: "Yet for all the impact of the sonic scale [of All Things Must Pass], it's perhaps the quieter moments that endure. The beautiful I'd Have You Anytime is Harrison at his most harmonically luxurious … the song has George showing [Dylan] his posh major sevenths and Bob responding with the forthright middle eight."

Among Beatles and Harrison biographers, Rodriguez considers the song to be an "exquisite" opening track, while Chip Madinger and Mark Easter rate it "A low-key opener for such a behemoth of an album, but an effective one". Bruce Spizer describes it as "a beautiful ballad" that "[hints] at greater things to come". Elliot Huntley similarly views "I'd Have You Anytime" as the "perfect choice" for the first song, and praises the "drifting quality" of Harrison's vocals on this "haunting, dream-like lullaby", as well as Clapton's "tastefully beautiful" lead guitar. Simon Leng considers the track to be "Beautifully sung" and "evidence that 'Something' was no fluke".

== Alternative version ==
The Harrison–Dylan demo of "I'd Have You Anytime" has never received an official release, although from the late 1970s, it began circulating among collectors on bootleg compilations, which stated an incorrect recording date of 1 May 1970. According to Dylan chronicler Olof Björner and Eight Arms to Hold You authors Chip Madinger and Mark Easter, Harrison and Dylan may have recorded the demos for this song and "Nowhere to Go" in Bearsville, during the original composing session in 1968. Both songs appear on bootlegs such as The Dylan Harrison Sessions and The Beatles – 20 x 4.

In November 2011, in its deluxe edition format, the British DVD release of Martin Scorsese's documentary George Harrison: Living in the Material World contained a CD that included an alternate take of "I'd Have You Anytime". Harrison archive producer Giles Martin describes it as "very organic ... a very fragile version of the song". The CD was released internationally in May 2012 as Early Takes: Volume 1.

== Cover versions ==
Since his death in November 2001, "I'd Have You Anytime" has appeared on Harrison tribute albums such as He Was Fab (2003), on which Champale contribute a "low-key, near-epic version" of the song, according to AllMusic's Tom Sendra, and Suburban Skies' George (2008). Other artists who have covered the song include Latin soul and salsa singer Ralfi Pagán, whose version later appeared on the multi-artist compilation A Salsa Tribute to the Beatles in 2007, and Fabulous Connections with Kate Vereau, who recorded "I'd Have You Anytime" and Harrison's "Learning How to Love You" for their 2003 album Into Midnight.

Actor and singer Evan Rachel Wood contributed a cover of "I'd Have You Anytime" to the 4-CD compilation Chimes of Freedom: The Songs of Bob Dylan Honoring 50 Years of Amnesty International in 2012. Wood filmed a video clip for the song in February that year, as a tribute to Harrison on what would have been his 69th birthday.

== Personnel ==
The musicians who performed on "I'd Have You Anytime" are believed to be as follows:

- George Harrison – vocals, acoustic guitars, backing vocals
- Eric Clapton – electric guitar
- Klaus Voormann – bass
- Alan White – drums
- uncredited – harmonium
- uncredited – vibraphone (Note: Leng and Spizer list a xylophone on the completed track. The master tape sheet lists "vibes" on track 5 of the 8-track tape.)
- John Barham – orchestral arrangement

== Sources ==
- Keith Badman, The Beatles Diary Volume 2: After the Break-Up 1970–2001, Omnibus Press (London, 2001; ISBN 0-7119-8307-0).
- The Beatles, The Beatles Anthology, Chronicle Books (San Francisco, CA, 2000; ISBN 0-8118-2684-8).
- Roy Carr & Tony Tyler, The Beatles: An Illustrated Record, Trewin Copplestone Publishing (London, 1978; ISBN 0-450-04170-0).
- Harry Castleman & Walter J. Podrazik, All Together Now: The First Complete Beatles Discography 1961–1975, Ballantine Books (New York, NY, 1976; ISBN 0-345-25680-8).
- Alan Clayson, George Harrison, Sanctuary (London, 2003; ISBN 1-86074-489-3).
- Peter Doggett, You Never Give Me Your Money: The Beatles After the Breakup, It Books (New York, NY, 2011; ISBN 978-0-06-177418-8).
- The Editors of Rolling Stone, Harrison, Rolling Stone Press/Simon & Schuster (New York, NY, 2002; ISBN 0-7432-3581-9).
- Joshua M. Greene, Here Comes the Sun: The Spiritual and Musical Journey of George Harrison, John Wiley & Sons (Hoboken, NJ, 2006; ISBN 978-0-470-12780-3).
- John Harris, "A Quiet Storm", Mojo, July 2001, pp. 66–74.
- George Harrison, I Me Mine, Chronicle Books (San Francisco, CA, 2002 [1980]; ISBN 0-8118-3793-9).
- Levon Helm (with Stephen Davis), This Wheel's on Fire: Levon Helm and the Story of The Band, A Cappella Books (Chicago, IL, 2000; ISBN 978-1-55652-405-9).
- Mark Hertsgaard, A Day in the Life: The Music and Artistry of the Beatles, Pan Books (London, 1996; ISBN 0-330-33891-9).
- Clinton Heylin, Bob Dylan: Behind the Shades (20th Anniversary Edition), Faber and Faber (London, 2011; ISBN 978-0-571-27240-2).
- Elliot J. Huntley, Mystical One: George Harrison – After the Break-up of the Beatles, Guernica Editions (Toronto, ON, 2006; ISBN 1-55071-197-0).
- Chris Ingham, The Rough Guide to the Beatles, Rough Guides/Penguin (London, 2006; 2nd edn; ISBN 978-1-8483-6525-4).
- Ian Inglis, The Words and Music of George Harrison, Praeger (Santa Barbara, CA, 2010; ISBN 978-0-313-37532-3).
- Ashley Kahn (ed.), George Harrison on George Harrison: Interviews and Encounters, Chicago Review Press (Chicago, IL, 2020; ISBN 978-1-64160-051-4).
- Simon Leng, While My Guitar Gently Weeps: The Music of George Harrison, Hal Leonard (Milwaukee, WI, 2006; ISBN 1-4234-0609-5).
- Ian MacDonald, Revolution in the Head: The Beatles' Records and the Sixties, Pimlico (London, 1998; ISBN 0-7126-6697-4).
- Chip Madinger & Mark Easter, Eight Arms to Hold You: The Solo Beatles Compendium, 44.1 Productions (Chesterfield, MO, 2000; ISBN 0-615-11724-4).
- Barry Miles, The Beatles Diary Volume 1: The Beatles Years, Omnibus Press (London, 2001; ISBN 0-7119-8308-9).
- Chris O'Dell (with Katherine Ketcham), Miss O'Dell: My Hard Days and Long Nights with The Beatles, The Stones, Bob Dylan, Eric Clapton, and the Women They Loved, Touchstone (New York, NY, 2009; ISBN 978-1-4165-9093-4).
- Robert Rodriguez, Fab Four FAQ 2.0: The Beatles' Solo Years, 1970–1980, Backbeat Books (Milwaukee, WI, 2010; ISBN 978-1-4165-9093-4).
- Patricia Romanowski & Holly George-Warren (eds), The New Rolling Stone Encyclopedia of Rock & Roll, Fireside/Rolling Stone Press (New York, NY, 1995; ISBN 0-684-81044-1).
- Nicholas Schaffner, The Beatles Forever, McGraw-Hill (New York, NY, 1978; ISBN 0-07-055087-5).
- Howard Sounes, Down the Highway: The Life of Bob Dylan, Doubleday (London, 2001; ISBN 0-385-60125-5).
- Bruce Spizer, The Beatles Solo on Apple Records, 498 Productions (New Orleans, LA, 2005; ISBN 0-9662649-5-9).
- Gary Tillery, Working Class Mystic: A Spiritual Biography of George Harrison, Quest Books (Wheaton, IL, 2011; ISBN 978-0-8356-0900-5).
- Timothy White, "George Harrison – Reconsidered", Musician, November 1987, pp. 50–67.
- Bobby Whitlock (with Marc Roberty), Bobby Whitlock: A Rock 'n' Roll Autobiography, McFarland (Jefferson, NC, 2010; ISBN 978-0-7864-6190-5).
