= Tracy Nelson (singer) =

American singer

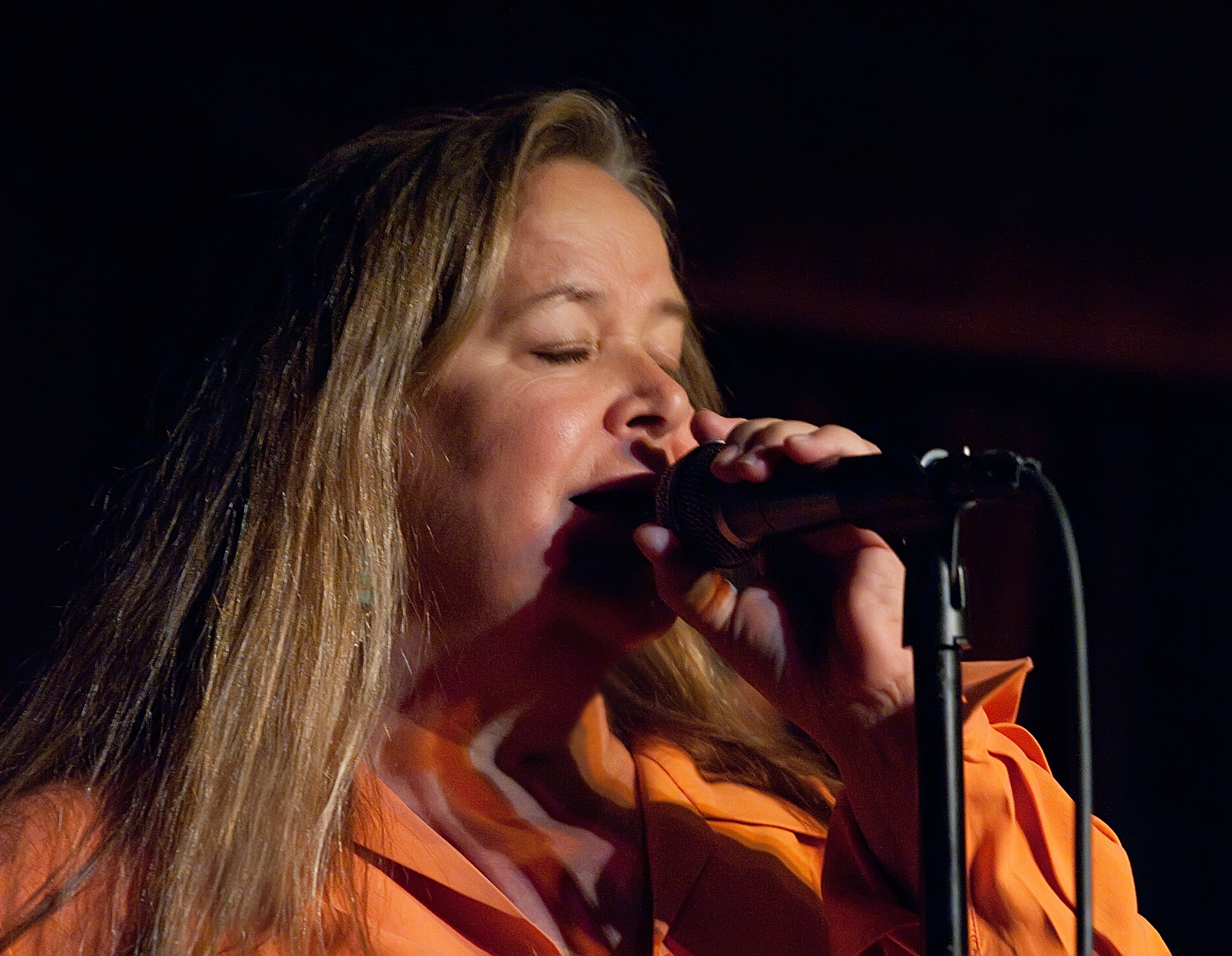
- Nelson performing in 2009

Background information
- Born: December 27, 1944 (age 81); Madison, Wisconsin, United States
- Genres: Country; blues
- Years active: 1960s–present
- Website: tracynelsonmusic.com

Tracy Nelson (born December 27, 1944) is an American country and blues singer. She has been involved in the recording of over 20 albums in her recording career, which started in 1965.

== Personal life ==
Nelson was born and grew up in Madison, Wisconsin, United States. There, she first learned about R&B music from nighttime listening to WLAC radio from Nashville, Tennessee. In her teens, Nelson sang folk music in coffeehouses and with The Fuller-Wood Singers group, and was lead singer in The Fabulous Imitations band. She attended the University of Wisconsin as a social science major.

== Career ==
=== Early recording career ===
In 1965, Nelson recorded an acoustic blues album released on Prestige Records, Deep Are the Roots. It featured blues harmonica player Charlie Musselwhite as a member of her backup band. In Chicago, where the album was recorded, Nelson met and learned from artists including Muddy Waters, Howlin' Wolf, and Otis Spann.

Nelson moved to San Francisco in 1966, where she became part of the music scene there. Her band Mother Earth played the Fillmore Auditorium, sharing bills with the Grateful Dead, Jefferson Airplane, Janis Joplin, and Jimi Hendrix. It was during this period that Nelson wrote and first recorded her signature song "Down So Low" (released on the first Mother Earth album Living with the Animals), which was later covered by Linda Ronstadt, Etta James, Diamanda Galás, Dee Dee Warwick, Ellen McIlwaine, Maria Muldaur, and Cyndi Lauper. Nelson also re-recorded "Down So Low" herself several times. The album also featured Mike Bloomfield, who she had met earlier in Chicago, on the band's eponymous song, "Mother Earth."

=== Later career ===
In the late 1960s, Nelson relocated to Nashville, where she and Mother Earth recorded the album Make A Joyful Noise and the solo effort Tracy Nelson Country. The latter features Nelson's cover of the country classic "Blue Blue Day". Nelson made a total of six albums with Mother Earth for the Mercury, Reprise, and Columbia labels. She has continued to record as a solo artist for Atlantic and other labels, including MCA, Flying Fish and Adelphi. In 1974, her duet with Willie Nelson, "After the Fire is Gone," was nominated for a Grammy Award. Her 1975 release Sweet Soul Music on the MCA label, included Leon Pendarvis and Richard Tee on keyboards and the Sweet Inspirations, and featured covers of Don Nix's "Same Old Blues" and Bob Dylan's "I'll Be Your Baby Tonight".

After a lengthy hiatus from recording in the 1980s, Nelson released several albums on the independent Rounder Records label in the 1990s. Her 1998 collaboration with label-mates Marcia Ball and Irma Thomas, "Sing It," garnered a second Grammy nomination. During this comeback period, she performed on American music television programs such as Sunday Night and Austin City Limits.

Since the early 2000s, Nelson has recorded for various independent record labels. She released her first in-concert album Live From Cell Block D in 2004. Other projects include a collaboration with blues-rock veterans Nick Gravenites, Harvey Mandel, Corky Siegel and Sam Lay. Billed as the Chicago Blues Reunion, the group toured major cities in 2005 and 2006.

In 2007, Nelson released You'll Never Be a Stranger at My Door, her first pure country effort since her 1969 album, Mother Earth Presents Tracy Nelson Country. Stranger included her covers of Johnny Cash's "I Still Miss Someone," Jim Reeves's "Four Walls"; the Everly Brothers' "I Wonder If I Care as Much" and a song based on a poem of her own composition, "Salt of the Earth".

Nelson continues as one of the four Blues Broads, with leader Angela Strehli, Annie Sampson, and Dorothy Morrison, as of 2019. The Blues Broads are based in Marin County, California, where Angela Strehli lives and works. Their live November 4, 2011, performance from the Throckmorton Theatre was released as a CD + DVD recording by Delta Groove Productions in 2012.

In July 2015, Nelson sang at an "all-star" concert in Nashville, organized by the Country Music Hall of Fame and Museum, to celebrate the Dylan, Cash, and the Nashville Cats: A New Music City exhibition and compilation-album release. She also wrote the introduction in the album booklet, outlining the shared influence between country and rock music over the 1960s and 1970s. On October 2, 2016, Nelson sang with Mariachi Mestizo at Hardly Strictly Bluegrass in San Francisco. From 2016 into 2018, Nelson performed intermittently with Missouri band the Bel Airs. Since 2018 Nelson has occasionally performed with Corky Siegel's Chamber Blues, of Chicago, as of 2021.

== Discography ==
=== Mother Earth ===
See Mother Earth article

=== Solo ===
- 1965 Deep Are the Roots (Prestige Records 7393, reissued 7726; P-Vine 5149 CD)
- 1969 Mother Earth Presents Tracy Nelson Country (Mercury Records)
- 1973 Poor Man's Paradise (Columbia Records)
- 1974 Tracy Nelson (Atlantic Records)
- 1975 Sweet Soul Music (MCA Records)
- 1976 Time Is on My Side (MCA Records)
- 1978 Homemade Songs (Flying Fish Records/Rounder Records)
- 1980 Come See About Me (Flying Fish Records/Rounder Records)
  - 1993 "Homemade Songs"/"Come See About Me" re-released on single CD (Rounder Records)
- 1980 Doin' It My Way (Adelphi Records)
- 1993 In the Here and Now (Rounder Records)
- 1995 I Feel So Good (Rounder Records)
- 1996 Move On (Rounder Records)
- 2001 Ebony and Irony (Relentless Nashville/Eclectic Records)
- 2004 Live From Cell Block D (Memphis International Records)
- 2007 You'll Never Be a Stranger at My Door (Memphis International Records)
- 2009 The Soul Sessions: Essential Recordings – selections from Homemade Songs and Come See About Me (Rounder Records)
- 2011 Victim of the Blues (Delta Groove Productions)
- 2023 Life Don't Miss Nobody (BMG Records)

=== Other collaborations (incomplete) ===
- 1998 Sing It! with Irma Thomas & Marcia Ball (Rounder Records)
- 2005 Buried Alive in the Blues Chicago Blues Reunion (33rd Street)
- 2012 The Blues Broads The Blues Broads, with Angela Strehli, Annie Sampson & Dorothy Morrison (Delta Groove Productions)
- 2015 Dylan, Cash, and the Nashville Cats: A New Music City (Legacy Recordings, CMF Records)
- 2017 Calling Nashville Trevor Sewell (self published). Tracy Nelson: duet with Sewell on "Long Time Ago"; backing vocals on "Someday" and "Blanket of Hope"
