= Cornelia Murr =

British-American singer-songwriter

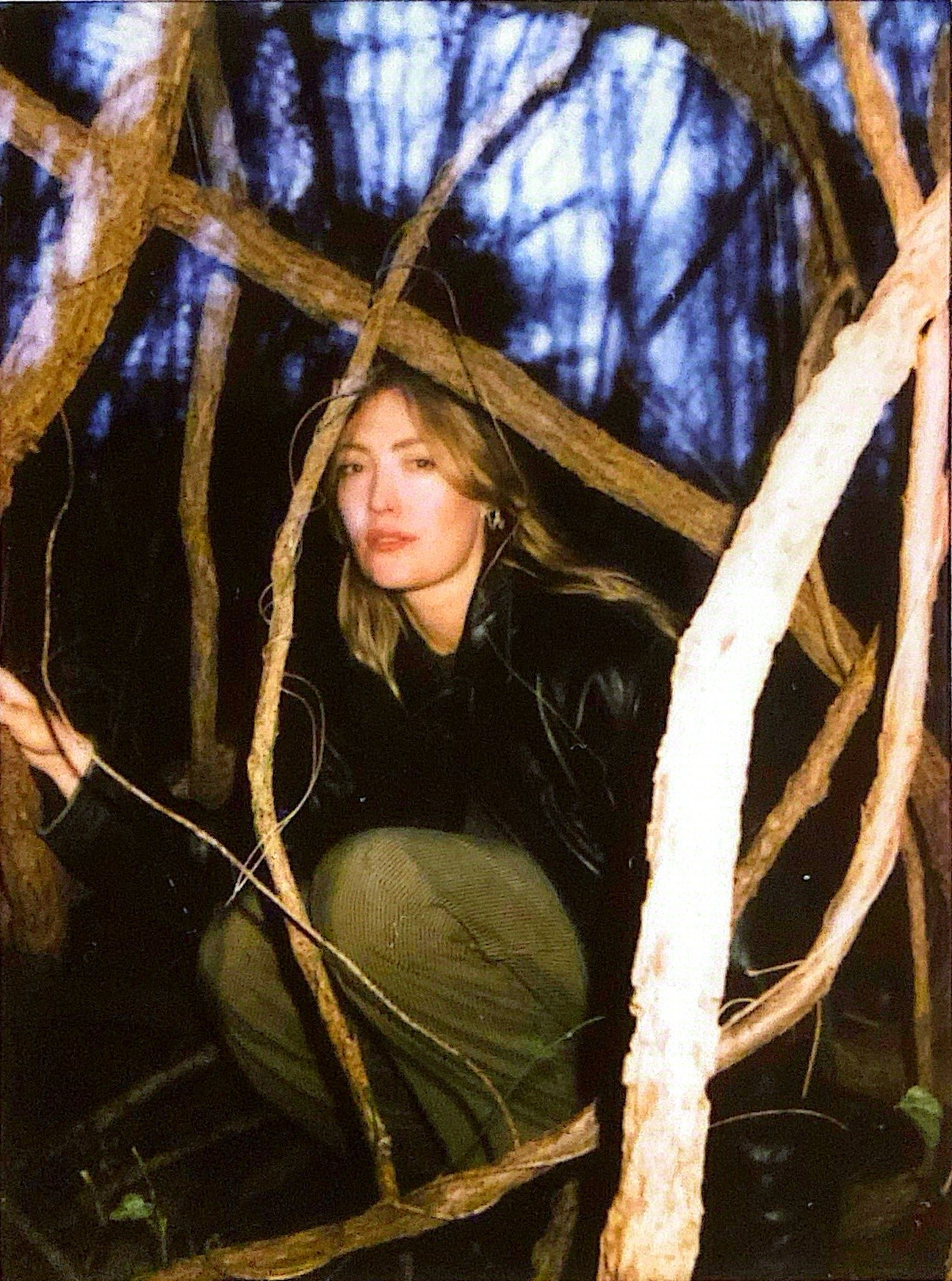
- Cornelia Murr by Caleb Lanier

Background information
- Born: Cornelia Livingston; July 12, 1989 (age 37); London, England
- Origin: Los Angeles, California, United States
- Genres: Indie folk, dream-pop, psychedelic pop
- Occupations: Singer-songwriter, Producer, Multi-instrumentalist
- Years active: 2018–present
- Labels: 22TWENTY, Autumn Tone Records, Full Time Hobby
- Website: www.corneliamurr.com

Cornelia Livingston (born July 12, 1989), known professionally as Cornelia Murr, is a British-American singer-songwriter. She released her debut album, Lake Tear of the Clouds, in 2018, followed by the EP Corridor in 2022. Murr's music blends elements of folk, dream-pop, and psychedelic pop, often characterized by ethereal vocals and introspective lyrics. In February 2025, she released her second full-length album, Run to the Center, on the label 22TWENTY. The album was produced by singer-songwriter Luke Temple and marked a shift toward a more expansive, confident sound described as "hypnotic pop".

== Early life ==
Murr was born in London and spent part of her childhood in Hertfordshire before moving to the United States, where she lived in California, Colorado, Massachusetts, and New York. She holds dual British and American citizenship. Her upbringing across different landscapes and cultures later influenced her songwriting. Murr eventually settled in Los Angeles in the mid-2010s to pursue music.

== Career ==
Murr spent years writing songs privately before officially launching her music career. Her debut album, Lake Tear of the Clouds, was released in July 2018 on Autumn Tone Records. Co-produced by Murr and Jim James of My Morning Jacket, the album was inspired by the landscapes of upstate New York and showcased a hazy, atmospheric folk sound. Pitchfork described it as "hazy, carefree psych-folk" that "obscures dense psychological dramas".

In November 2022, Murr released the self-produced EP Corridor on the London-based label Full Time Hobby. The EP marked an exploration into dream-pop realms, blending ethereal melodies with introspective lyrics.

In 2024, Murr signed with independent record label 22TWENTY. This was confirmed with the release of her single "How Do You Get By?" under the label.

Murr’s second album, Run to the Center, was released on February 28, 2025, via 22TWENTY. The album was largely written while Murr was restoring a house in rural Nebraska.

Run to the Center received positive reviews from critics. No Depression praised the album's “up-from-the-ashes spirit of new beginnings” and noted that its percussive arrangements made for a more tactile, grounded sound. Seattle radio station KEXP called the album “a strong set of earthy, dreamy, arty indie pop with a folky, timeless touch.”

Murr has collaborated with artists including Rodrigo Amarante, Alice Boman, Reverend Baron, Oracle Sisters, and Lucius.

== Musical style ==
Murr's music blends indie folk, dream-pop, and psychedelic elements. Her vocals are frequently described as soft and haunting, ranging from "smoky and low to wispy and ethereal". While her earlier work had a minimalist approach, Run to the Center introduced a fuller production style with more rhythmic and synth-driven elements. Her lyrics frequently explore themes of self-discovery, longing, and resilience, often using nature as a metaphor. Critics have praised her ability to maintain an intimate, dreamlike quality while evolving her sound with each release.
