= Tribute To =

EP by Yim Yames
- Released: August 4, 2009
- Recorded: December 2001
- Genre: Pop
- Length: 26:39
- Label: ATO
- Producer: Jim James

Yim Yames chronology
| Tribute To (2009) | New Multitudes (2012) |

Professional ratings
Review scores
| Source | Rating |
|---|---|
| AllMusic | 4/5 stars |
| CHARTattack | 4/5 stars |
| Drowned in Sound | 7/10 |
| Entertainment Weekly | B |
| OnMilwaukee.com | (favorable) |
| Pitchfork | 6.7/10 |
| Rolling Stone | 3.5/5 stars |
| The Skinny | 4/5 stars |
| Spin | 8/10 |

Tribute To is an EP by My Morning Jacket lead singer Jim James (under the name Yim Yames), consisting entirely of covers of songs written by George Harrison, both from his solo career and Beatles). The EP was released as a digital download via his website, on July 7, 2009. The album was released as a CD on August 4, 2009. James recorded the album in December 2001 on a relative's eight-track reel-to-reel tape recorder, just days after Harrison's passing. Of the recording, James told Billboard magazine that "I felt like I was in the weirdest head space when I did that EP … I felt really confused a lot of the time. I wanted to just do it and let it come out even if I messed stuff up. It's definitely not the tightest or most professional recording you're ever going to hear in your life but I like that. I think it lends it a more childish atmosphere."

The recordings were described as "delicate and suitably reverential" by The Skinny.

James announced that a portion of the proceeds would be donated to the Woodstock Farm Animal Sanctuary.

== Track listing ==
All tracks are written by George Harrison.

| No. | Title | Length |
|---|---|---|
| 1. | "Long, Long, Long" | 3:58 |
| 2. | "Behind That Locked Door" | 4:18 |
| 3. | "Love You To" | 4:22 |
| 4. | "My Sweet Lord" | 3:33 |
| 5. | "Ballad of Sir Frankie Crisp (Let It Roll)" | 5:10 |
| 6. | "All Things Must Pass" | 5:21 |
| Total length: | | 26:39 |

== Personnel ==
- Jim James - vocals, guitar, banjo, piano
