= Life Don't Miss Nobody =

Studio album by Tracy Nelson
- Released: June 9, 2023
- Genre: Blues
- Label: BMG
- Producer: Roger Alan Nichols

Life Don't Miss Nobody is an album by Tracy Nelson. It earned a Grammy Award nomination for Best Traditional Blues Album. It features iconic artists such as Hank Williams and Mike Henderson.

== Track listing ==
1. "Strange Things Happening Every Day"
2. "There Is Always One More Time"
3. "Life Don't Miss Nobody"
4. "Your Funeral and My Trial"
5. "Yonder Come the Blues"
6. "I Did My Part" (featuring Marcia Ball & Irma Thomas)
7. "Hard Times"
8. "Honky Tonkin'" (featuring Willie Nelson)
9. "It Don't Make Sense"
10. "Compared to What" (featuring Terry Hanck)
11. "Where Do You Go" (When You Can't Go Home)
12. "Brown Eyed Handsome Man" (featuring Dianne Davidson & Marcia Ball)
13. "Hard Times" (solo version)
