= Uniform Distortion =

Studio album by Jim James
- Released: June 29, 2018
- Studios: La La Land Studios, Louisville, Kentucky
- Genre: Indie rock
- Length: 40:09
- Label: ATO
- Producers: Jim James; Kevin Ratterman

Jim James chronology
Tribute To 2 (2017)	Uniform Distortion (2018)	Uniform Clarity (2018)

Professional ratings
Aggregate scores
Source	Rating
AnyDecentMusic?	7.4/10
Metacritic	77/100
Review scores
Source	Rating
AllMusic	4/5 stars
American Songwriter	4/5 stars
Consequence of Sound	B+
Exclaim!	7/10
The Guardian	4/5 stars
The Line of Best Fit	7/10
MusicOMH	4/5 stars
Paste	7.9/10
Pitchfork	7.6/10
Rolling Stone	3/5 stars

Uniform Distortion is the third studio album by American musician and lead vocalist of My Morning Jacket Jim James. It was released on June 29, 2018 under ATO Records.

== Production ==
Jim James explained the inspiration for the album came from the 1970s magazine Whole Earth Catalog. Inside the magazine was a photograph titled "Illuminated Man" by Duane Michals, which James used for the album cover. James wrote a letter to Duane in the hope he could use the photograph for the album. The album was produced by James and Kevin Ratterman at La La Land studio in Louisville, Kentucky.

== Release ==
On April 17, 2018, Jim James announced the release of his third studio album, along with the first music video for "Just a Fool". The single was performed live on The Late Show with Stephen Colbert on May 24, 2018.

The second single "Throwback" was released on May 31, 2018.

== Critical reception ==
Uniform Distortion was met with "generally favorable" reviews from critics. At Metacritic, which assigns a weighted average rating out of 100 to reviews from mainstream publications, this release received an average score of 77, based on 17 reviews. Aggregator Album of the Year gave the release a 76 out of 100 based on a critical consensus of 18 reviews.

Thom Jurek of AllMusic praised the album by saying: "The songs are wonderfully hooky tomes about self-reflection with societal jeremiads woven through. While it may not be any easier to make one's way through the distortion that James references, it is somehow easier to bear because of the empathy, joy, and contradiction in these songs." Owen Torrey of Exclaim said that the album "shears off some of the unrulier arrangements of James' earlier solo material, in favour of structures that emphasize immediacy and intensity. For the most part, the album is distinctly nostalgic in sound, chock full of sugary backing vocals, driving rhythms and splayed guitar lines." Oliver Kuscher from The Line of Best Fit explained the album "may be the most straightforward sounding a set of Jim James songs has ever released, but they’ve somehow absorbed the distortion of today’s world and turned it into something we can all make sense of, and in which we can seek some solace."

== Track listing ==
Uniform Distortion track listing
No.	Title	Length
1.	"Just a Fool"	4:00
2.	"You Get to Rome"	2:28
3.	"Out of Time"	2:51
4.	"Throwback"	5:18
5.	"No Secrets"	4:52
6.	"Yes to Everything"	4:44
7.	"No Use Waiting"	3:35
8.	"All in Your Head"	3:01
9.	"Better Late Than Never"	1:58
10.	"Over and Over"	3:38
11.	"Too Good to Be True"	3:44

== Personnel ==
Musicians

- Jim James – primary artist, producer, mixing
- Jamie Drake – backing vocals
- Kathleen Grace – backing vocals
- Leslie Stevens – backing vocals
- Seth Kaufman – bass
- David Givan – drums

Production

- Bob Ludwig – mastering
- Kevin Ratterman – engineer, producer

== Charts ==
Chart performance for Uniform Distortion
Chart (2018)	Peak position
Scottish Albums (Official Charts)	87
UK Americana Albums (Official Charts)	8
UK Independent Albums (Official Charts)	32
US Billboard 200	200
US Americana/Folk Albums (Billboard)	6
US Independent Albums (Billboard)	5
US Top Alternative Albums (Billboard)	20
US Top Album Sales (Billboard)	26
US Top Rock Albums (Billboard)	48
US Indie Store Album Sales (Billboard)	8
US Vinyl Albums (Billboard)	6
