= Jim James =

American musician (born 1978)

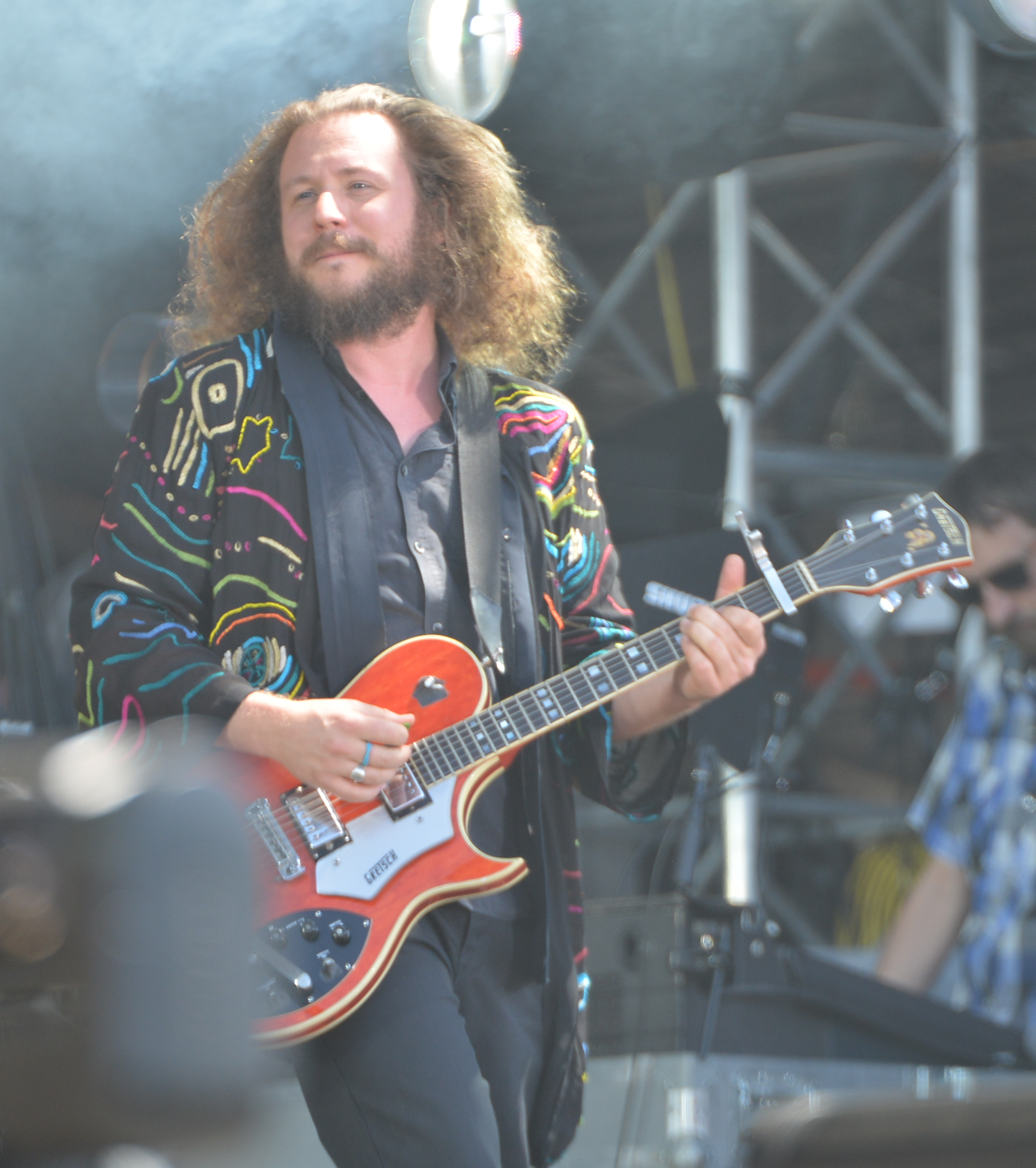
- James performing in 2015

Background information
- Also known as: Yim Yames
- Born: James Edward Olliges Jr. April 27, 1978 (age 48)
- Origin: Louisville, Kentucky, U.S.
- Genres: Psychedelic rock, indie rock, jam rock
- Occupations: Singer-songwriter, musician, guitarist
- Instruments: Vocals, guitar, bass, keyboards, omnichord, drums, percussion, harmonica, banjo
- Years active: 1992—present
- Labels: ATO; MapleMusic
- Member of: My Morning Jacket
- Formerly of: Monsters of Folk; The New Basement Tapes

Signature
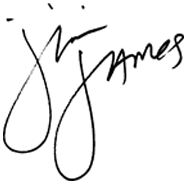

James Edward Olliges Jr. (born April 27, 1978), professionally known as Jim James or Yim Yames, is an American vocalist, guitarist, producer, and primary songwriter of the rock band My Morning Jacket. He has also released several solo albums.

== Early life, family and education ==
James was raised in the Highlands–Douglass neighborhood of Louisville, Kentucky. Raised Catholic, he attended St. Martha Grade School and graduated from St. Xavier High School in 1996. James briefly attended the University of Kentucky in Lexington, Kentucky.

== Career ==
Prior to forming My Morning Jacket, James was the vocalist and guitarist for a number of Louisville bands, including Hotel Roy and Month of Sundays.

As the vocalist, frontman, producer, and lead songwriter for My Morning Jacket, James has been instrumental in defining the sound of the band. He was given an "Esky" for best songwriter in Esquire's 2006 Esky Music Awards in the April issue.

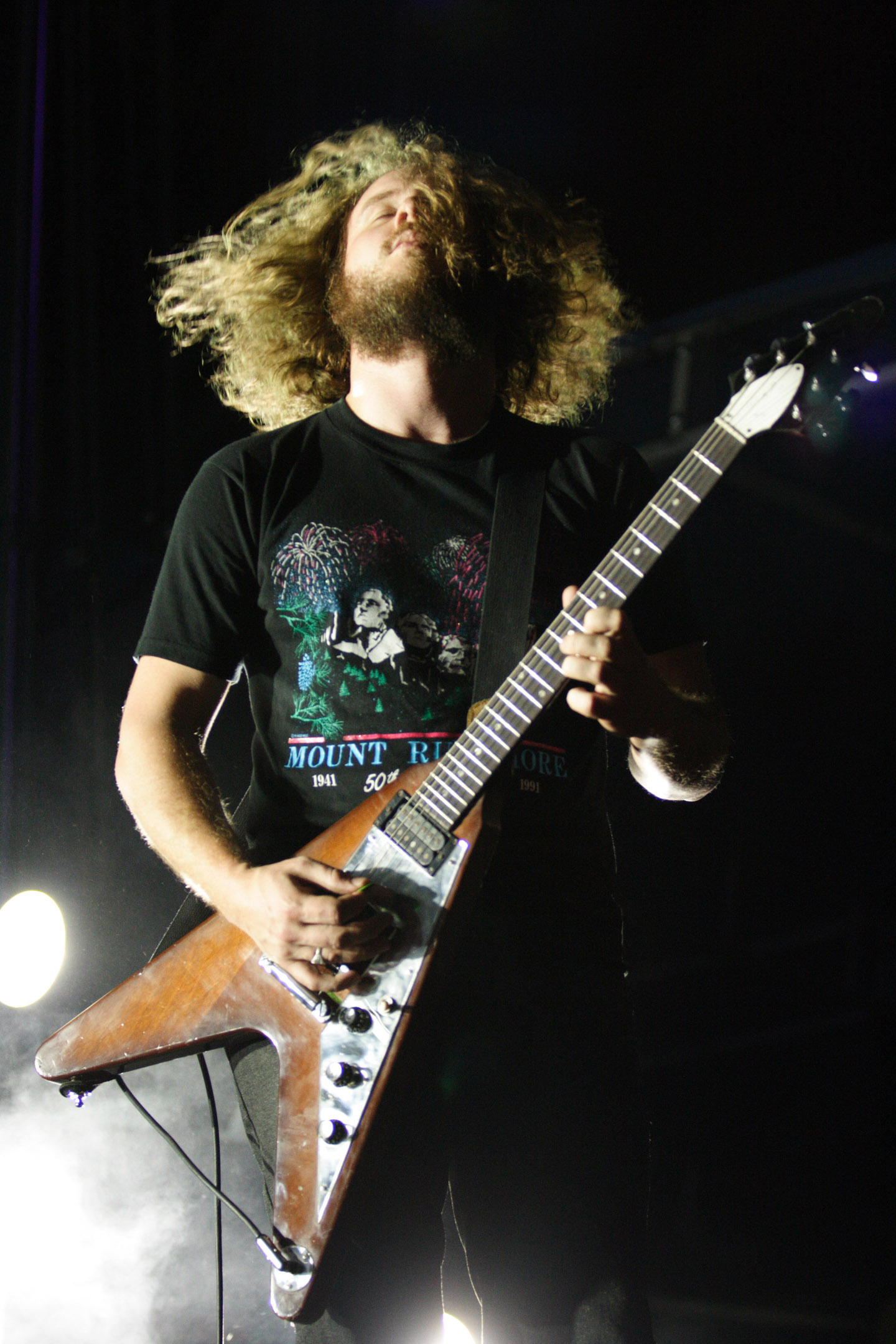
James performing in 2007

James typically plays rhythm guitar, acoustic guitar, and occasional lead guitar on My Morning Jacket songs. He played the role of the band leader in the Bob Dylan biopic I'm Not There, singing the song "Going to Acapulco", with Calexico as his backing band, which was featured on the soundtrack of the film. Rolling Stone listed James among their "20 New Guitar Gods" along with fellow My Morning Jacket guitarist Carl Broemel. In 2008, James, along with former My Morning Jacket guitarist and cousin Johnny Quaid, formed Removador Recordings and Solutions record label. The label, as described on its website, functions "on the simple principal of yielding the highest annual percentage of aural joy back into the hearts and minds of investors and shareholders with ease and convenience".

In 2009, he contributed vocals on The Decemberists' album The Hazards of Love. On April 4 that year, James performed at the Radio City Music Hall, New York City, in the "Change Begins Within" concert benefitting the David Lynch Foundation. On July 7, James released Tribute To, an EP covering George Harrison songs. A portion of the proceeds from the album were donated to the Woodstock Farm Animal Sanctuary. The EP was available on yimyames.com as both a digital download and a physical CD/LP. That same year, James and the rest of My Morning Jacket played themselves in "My Morning Straitjacket", an episode of the animated television series American Dad! James also participated along with Conor Oberst, M. Ward, and Mike Mogis in the supergroup, Monsters of Folk, which released a self-titled album in 2009.

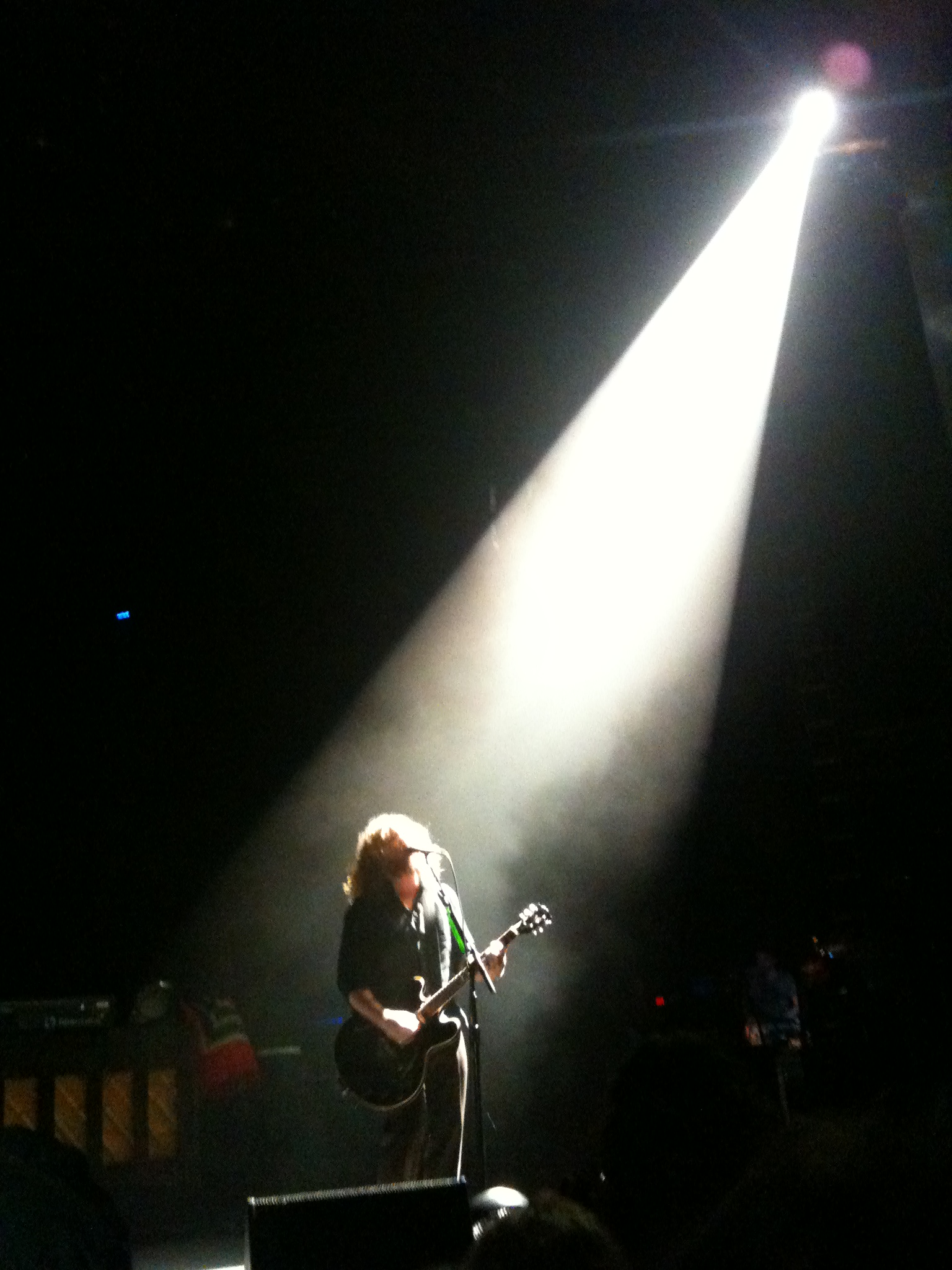
James performing in August 2011

In 2012, Rounder Records released the Woody Guthrie tribute album New Multitudes which features songs covered by a variety of musicians including James (as Yim Yames) and Jay Farrar. James wrote an article on My Morning Jacket, discussing how the band got its name and growing up in Louisville, for the July 2012 issue of Louisville magazine. Bandmates Patrick Hallahan and Tom Blankenship also wrote articles for the issue.

James released his debut solo full-length album, Regions of Light and Sound of God, on ATO Records on February 5, 2013. In early 2014, James recorded for Lost on the River: The New Basement Tapes alongside Elvis Costello, Marcus Mumford, Taylor Goldsmith and Rhiannon Giddens. The album was produced by T-Bone Burnett and is a compilation of partial songs written by Bob Dylan that were never released.

On November 5, 2015, the David Lynch Foundation organized another benefit concert at New York City's Carnegie Hall named "Change Begins Within" to promote transcendental meditation for stress control. Jim James participated with Katy Perry, Sting, Jerry Seinfeld, Angelique Kidjo, and classical guitarist Sharon Isbin. And since each of the performers actively practices transcendental meditation, they also spoke to its power.

In 2016, James played himself and sings in two episodes of the Showtime series Roadies. In November 2016, he released his second solo album Eternally Even.

James and Teddy Abrams co-wrote a suite of songs that were performed with the Louisville Orchestra on April 6 and 7, 2018 at the Kentucky Center for the Arts. On April 17, 2018, James announced the June 29 release of his third solo album of original material, Uniform Distortion. Along with the announcement was the release of a single and music video for the album's opening track "Just A Fool". Also, included with the announcement was a letter James wrote to photographer Duane Michals requesting use of his photograph "The Illuminated Man" for the album's cover art. James discovered the photo in the 1971 publication The Last Whole Earth Catalog, which he stated was a primary inspiration for the new album. In 2018, James also co-produced the debut album by Cornelia Murr, Lake Tear of the Clouds.

== Personal life ==
Although James was raised Catholic, he has been practicing Transcendental Meditation since 2009.

He previously dated one of the singers in his solo touring band. James has several tattoos.

In 2008, he fell off the stage during a concert in Iowa, which inspired the recording of his first solo album. He has cited Shannon Hoon, Roy Orbison, and Marvin Gaye as influences on his vocal style.

== Discography ==
=== Solo ===
==== Studio albums ====
- Regions of Light and Sound of God (2013)
- Eternally Even (2016)
- Uniform Distortion (2018)
- Uniform Clarity (2018)
- Wowed Out (2026)

==== EPs ====
- Tribute To (2009)
- Tribute To 2 (2017)

=== Collaborative albums ===
- New Multitudes (with Jay Farrar, Will Johnson and Anders Parker) (2012)
- The Order of Nature (with Teddy Abrams and the Louisville Orchestra) (2019)

=== Monsters of Folk ===
- Monsters of Folk (2009)

=== The New Basement Tapes ===
- Lost on the River: The New Basement Tapes (2014)

=== Guest appearances ===
- James is a guest vocalist on the M. Ward albums “Transistor Radio,” “Post War,” and “What A Wonderful Industry.” James plays saxophone on a cover version of David Bowie’s “I Can’t Give Everything Away” on the M. Ward album “Supernatural Thing.”
- James sings backup vocals on the title track of Dr. Dog's 2010 album Shame, Shame
- James appears on The Sachal Ensemble album Song of Lahore (Universal, 2016)
- After the death of Bill Withers in 2020, he appeared as the musical guest on The Late Show with Stephen Colbert where he performed Wither's classic song, "Lean on Me"
- James appeared in the documentary, Good Trip: Adventures in Psychedelics

== Equipment ==
- Gibson Custom ES-335 (Dot figured-top electric guitar with gloss finish honey burst) In 2021, he partnered with Gibson to release a signature guitar.
