= Woodstock Farm Sanctuary =

Non-profit animal rescue, sanctuary, and advocacy organization in New York, US

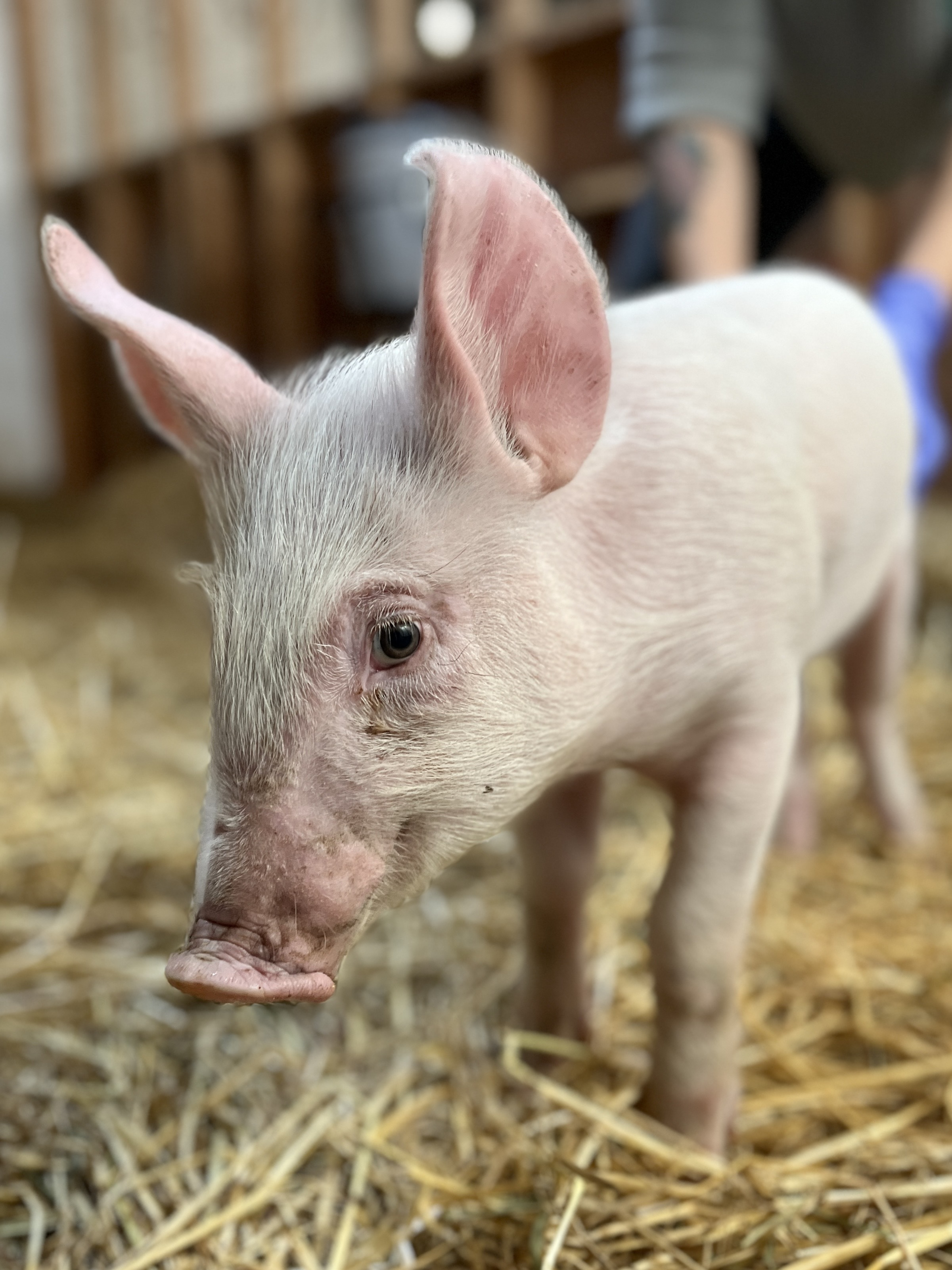
Marge the piglet in 2023. Rescued from Slaughter

Woodstock Farm Sanctuary (previously Woodstock Farm Animal Sanctuary) is a farmed animal rights and rescue organization in High Falls, NY. Woodstock Sanctuary is one of the most recognized and well-respected animal sanctuaries in the world with a focus on specialized care for all of their hundreds of rescued animals.

== History ==
In May 2004, Woodstock Farm Sanctuary was founded by Jenny Brown and Doug Abel outside of Woodstock, NY. In 2014, Woodstock Farm Sanctuary purchased a 150-acre property to be able to rescue additional animals and increase Public Education opportunities When the Sanctuary moved locations they also updated their name from Woodstock Farm Animal Sanctuary to Woodstock Farm Sanctuary.

In its 20 years of animal rescue and advocacy work, Woodstock Farm Sanctuary has saved thousands of animals’ lives from around the country. With annual events and Public Education tours, the Sanctuary has welcomed tens of thousands of visitors from all over the country to visit, stay, and fall in love with farmed animals. They have reached hundreds of millions through targeted campaigns and advocacy that focus on education about industrial farming and pressure campaigns. The Sanctuary also conducts conservation and restoration work on the property and works to educate about the role of industrial animal agriculture on the environment. including climate harm and biodiversity loss.

The organization is funded through individual donations, including a membership program, and has a large volunteer program. Visitors and volunteers come from around the world to help out and learn.

Woodstock Farm Sanctuary's Mission: We seek to end animal agriculture by rescuing farmed animals, giving them lifelong care and sanctuary, and educating about the harms of animal farming.

== See also ==
- Veganism
- Factory Farming
- Animal Welfare
- Animal Rights
