= Va Bene =

Va Bene is an Italian expression meaning "all right". It may refer to:

- Va Bene (yacht), a luxury yacht designed by Richard Hein and built in 1992 by Kees Cornelissen
- "Va bene" (song), 2014 multilingual song by La Fouine featuring singer Reda Taliani
- "Va Bene", 2018 song by L'Algérino

== Also see ==
- Va bene, va bene così, 1984 live album of Italian singer Vasco Rossi
- Anche libero va bene, original Italian title of Along the Ridge, a 2006 Italian film directed by Kim Rossi Stuart
