= Eric Clapton =

English musician (born 1945)

Eric Clapton CBE
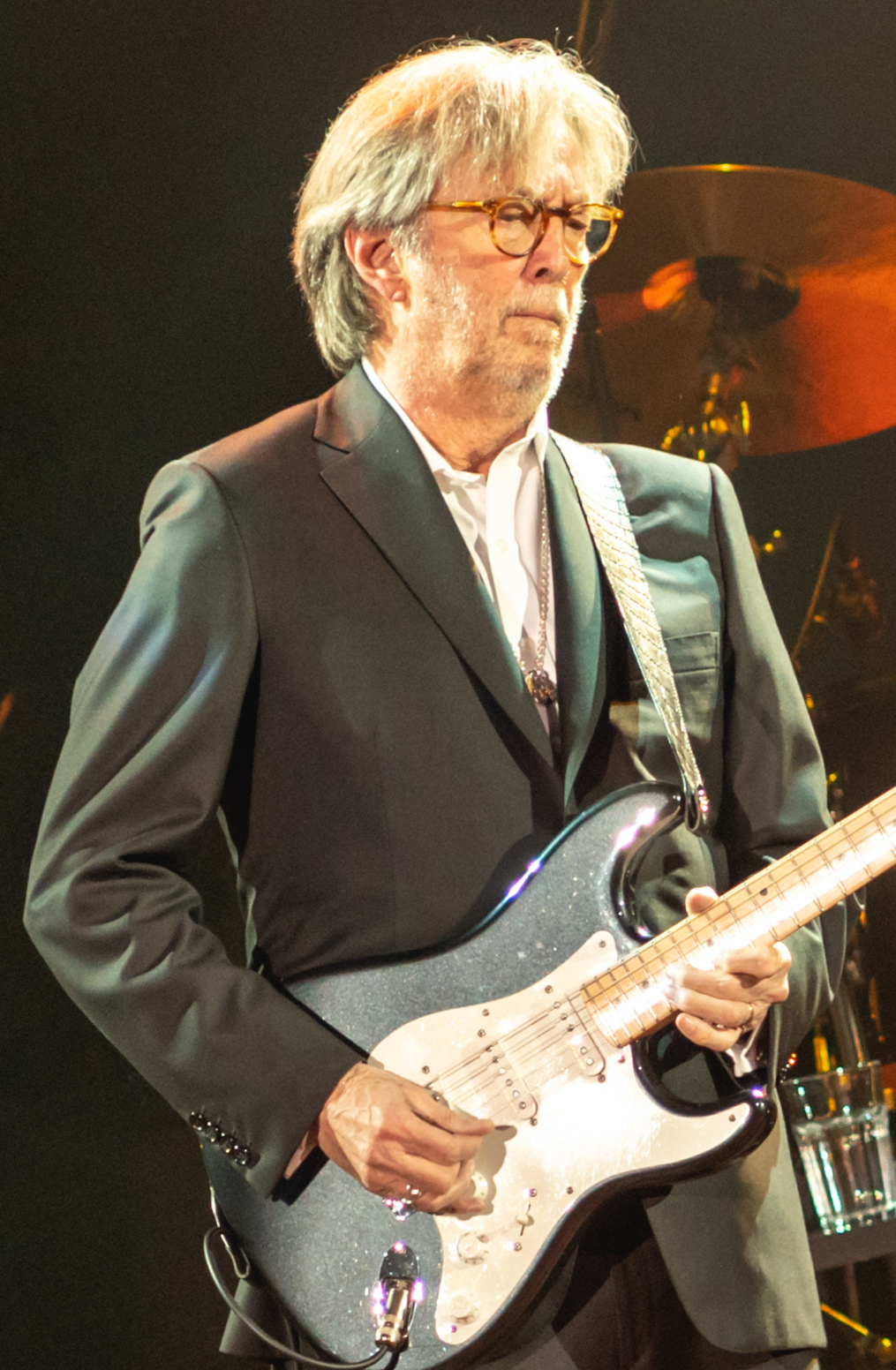
- Clapton in 2020
- Born: Eric Patrick Clapton; 30 March 1945 (age 81); Ripley, Surrey, England
- Occupations: Musician; singer; songwriter
- Years active: 1962–present
- Spouses: Pattie Boyd (m. 1979; div. 1989) Melia McEnery (m. 2002)
- Children: 5
- Musical career
- Genres: Rock; blues
- Instruments: Guitar; vocals
- Labels: Polydor; Atco; RSO; Warner Bros.; Duck; Reprise; Surfdog
- Formerly of: The Roosters; Casey Jones and the Engineers; The Yardbirds; John Mayall & the Bluesbreakers; The Immediate All-Stars; Eric Clapton and the Powerhouse; Cream; The Dirty Mac; Plastic Ono Band; Blind Faith; Delaney & Bonnie; Derek and the Dominos; The Louisiana Gator Boys
- Website: ericclapton.com

Eric Patrick Clapton (born 30 March 1945) is an English rock and blues guitarist, singer, and songwriter. He is regarded as one of the most successful and influential guitarists in rock music. Clapton ranked second in Rolling Stone's list of the "100 Greatest Guitarists of All Time" and fourth in Gibson's "Top 50 Guitarists of All Time". He was named number five in Time magazine's list of "The 10 Best Electric Guitar Players" in 2009.

After playing in a number of different local bands, Clapton joined the Yardbirds from 1963 to 1965, and John Mayall & the Bluesbreakers from 1965 to 1966. After leaving Mayall, he formed the power trio Cream with drummer Ginger Baker and bassist/vocalist Jack Bruce, in which Clapton played sustained blues improvisations and "arty, blues-based psychedelic pop". After four successful albums, Cream broke up in November 1968. Clapton then formed the blues rock band Blind Faith with Baker, Steve Winwood, and Ric Grech, recording one album and performing on one tour before they broke up. Clapton then toured with Delaney & Bonnie and recorded his first solo album in 1970, before forming Derek and the Dominos with Bobby Whitlock, Carl Radle and Jim Gordon. Like Blind Faith, the band only lasted one album, Layla and Other Assorted Love Songs, which includes "Layla", one of Clapton's signature songs.

Clapton continued to record a number of successful solo albums and songs over the next several decades, including a 1974 cover of Bob Marley's "I Shot the Sheriff" (which helped reggae reach a mass market), the country-infused Slowhand album (1977) and the pop rock of 1986's August. Following the death of his son Conor in 1991, Clapton's grief was expressed in the song "Tears in Heaven", which peaked at number two on the Billboard Hot 100 and appeared on his Unplugged album. In 1996 he had another top-40 hit with the R&B crossover "Change the World". In 1998, he released the Grammy award-winning "My Father's Eyes". Since 1999, he has recorded a number of traditional blues and blues rock albums and hosted the periodic Crossroads Guitar Festival. His latest studio album, Meanwhile, was released in 2024.

Clapton has received 18 Grammy Awards as well as the Brit Award for Outstanding Contribution to Music. In 2004, he was awarded a CBE for services to music. He has received four Ivor Novello Awards from the British Academy of Songwriters, Composers and Authors, including the Lifetime Achievement Award. He is the only three-time inductee to the Rock and Roll Hall of Fame: once as a solo artist, and separately as a member of the Yardbirds and of Cream. In his solo career, he has sold 100 million records worldwide, making him one of the best-selling musicians of all time. In 1998, Clapton, recovering from addiction himself, founded the Crossroads Centre on Antigua, a medical facility for those recovering from substance abuse.

== Early life ==
Clapton was born on 30 March 1945 in Ripley, Surrey, England, to 16-year-old Patricia Molly Clapton (1929–1999) and Edward Walter Fryer (1920–1985), a 25-year-old soldier from Montreal, Quebec. Fryer was drafted to war before Clapton's birth and then returned to Canada. Clapton grew up believing that his grandmother, Rose, and her second husband, Jack Clapp, Patricia's stepfather, were his parents, and that his mother was actually his older sister. The similarity in surnames gave rise to the erroneous belief that Clapton's real surname is Clapp (Reginald Cecil Clapton was the name of Rose's first husband, Eric Clapton's maternal grandfather). Years later, his mother married another Canadian soldier and moved to Germany, leaving Eric with his grandparents in Surrey.

Clapton received an acoustic Hoyer guitar, made in Germany, for his thirteenth birthday, but the inexpensive steel-stringed instrument was difficult to play and he briefly lost interest. Two years later he picked it up again and started playing consistently. He was influenced by blues music from an early age, and practised long hours learning the chords of blues music by playing along to the records. He preserved his practice sessions using his portable Grundig reel-to-reel tape recorder, listening to them over and over until he was satisfied.

In 1961, after leaving Hollyfield School in Surbiton, he studied at the Kingston College of Art but was expelled at the end of the academic year because his focus had remained on music rather than art. His guitar playing was sufficiently advanced that, by the age of 16, he was getting noticed. Around this time, he began busking around Kingston, Richmond, and the West End. In 1962, he started performing as a duo with fellow blues enthusiast Dave Brock in pubs around Surrey. When he was 17, he joined his first band, an early British R&B group, the Roosters, whose other guitarist was Tom McGuinness. He stayed with them from January until August 1963. In October of that year, he performed a seven-gig stint with Casey Jones and the Engineers.

== Career ==
=== The Yardbirds and the Bluesbreakers ===
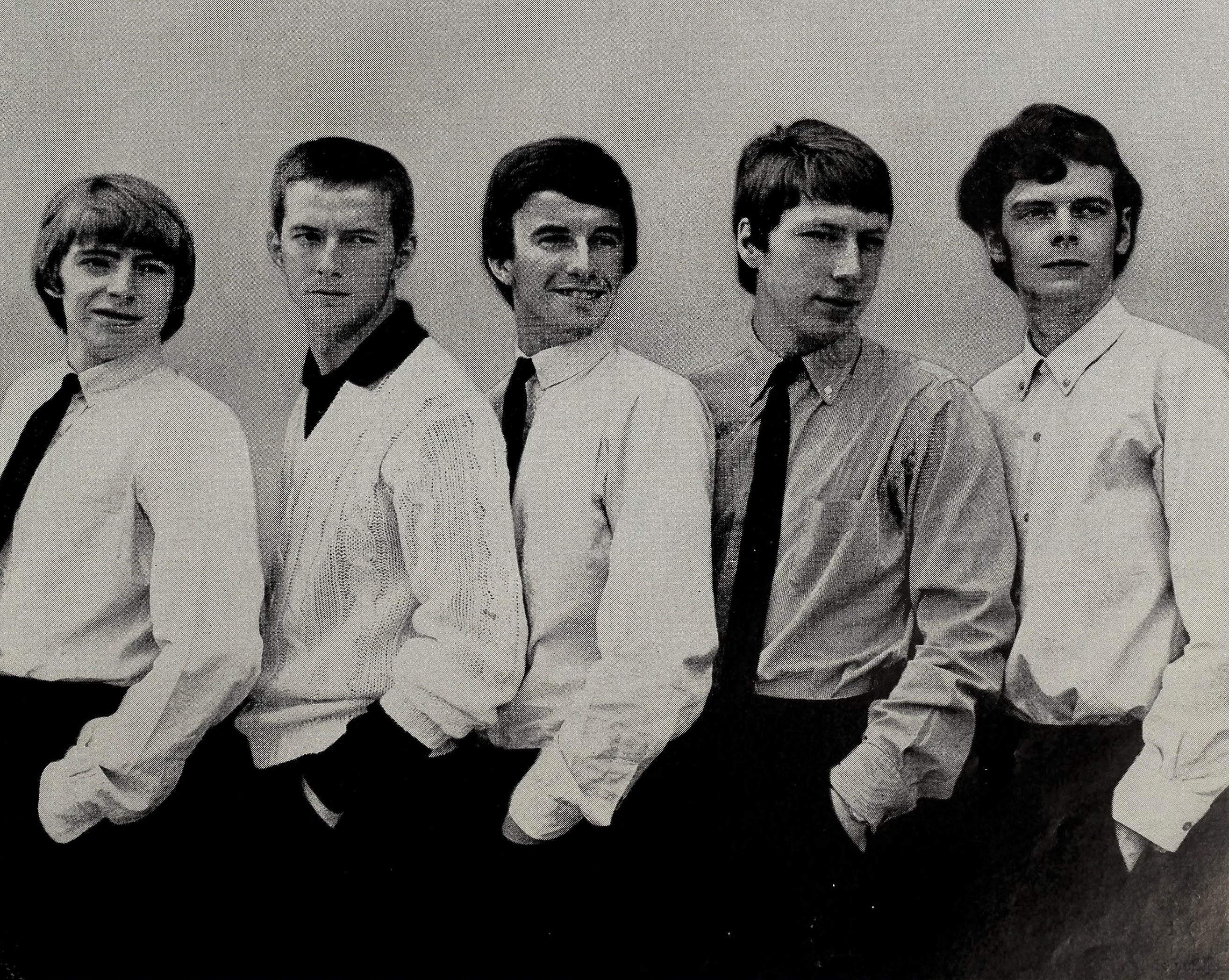
Clapton (second from left) with the Yardbirds in 1964

In October 1963, Clapton joined the Yardbirds, a rhythm and blues band, and stayed with them until March 1965. Synthesising influences from Chicago blues and leading blues guitarists such as Buddy Guy, Freddie King, and B.B. King, Clapton forged a distinctive style and rapidly became one of the most talked-about guitarists in the British music scene. The band initially played Chess/Checker/Vee-Jay blues numbers and began to attract a large cult following when they took over the Rolling Stones' residency at the Crawdaddy Club in Richmond, London. They toured England with American bluesman Sonny Boy Williamson II; a joint LP album, recorded in December 1963, was issued in 1965.

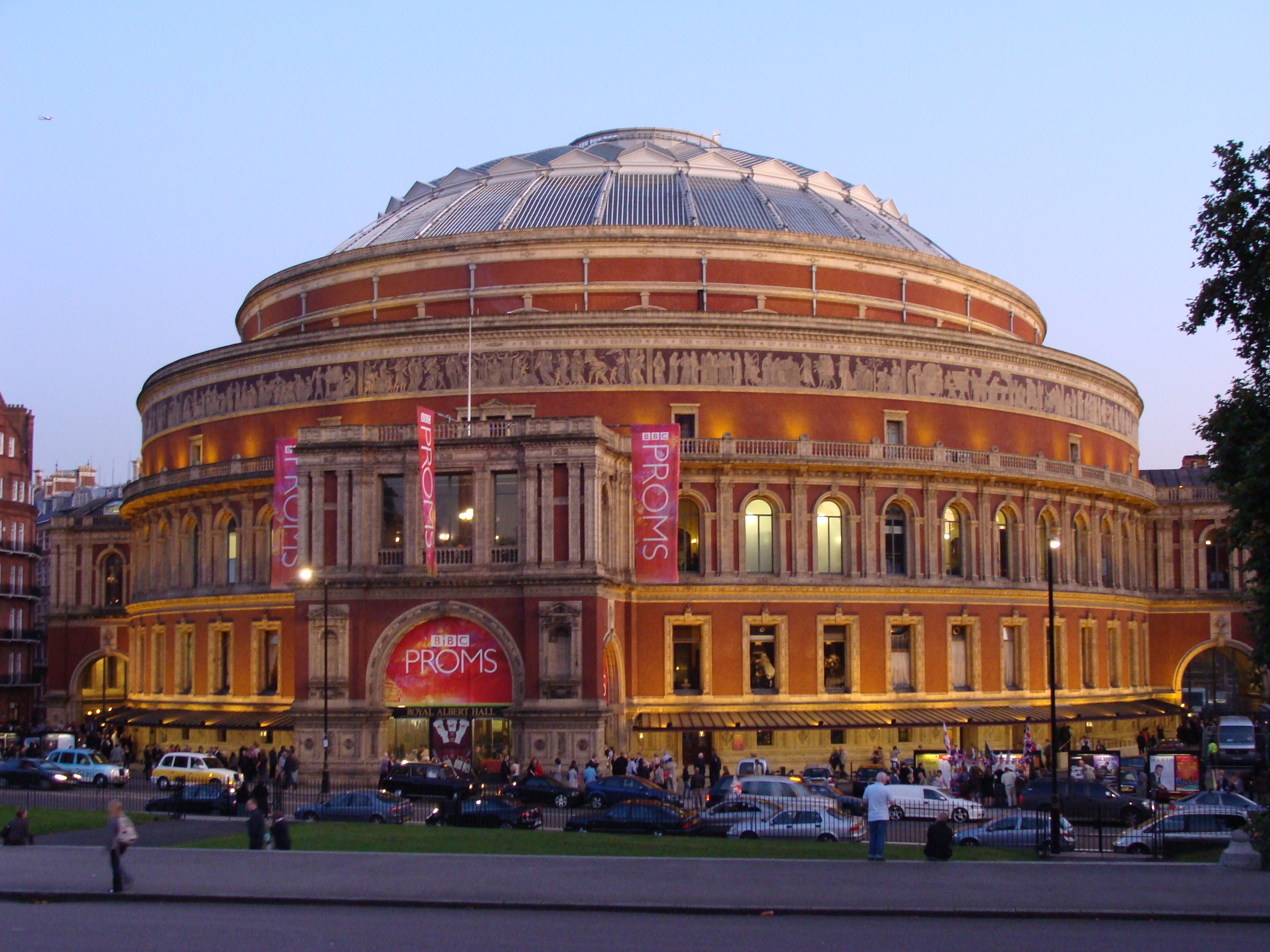
Clapton has performed at the Royal Albert Hall in London over 200 times since his first appearance there in 1964.

Yardbirds' rhythm guitarist Chris Dreja recalled that whenever Clapton broke a guitar string during a concert, he would stay on stage and replace it. The English audiences would wait out the delay by doing what is called a "slow handclap". Clapton's nickname of "Slowhand" came from Giorgio Gomelsky, a pun on the slow handclapping that ensued when Clapton stopped playing while he replaced a string. In December 1964, Clapton made his first appearance at the Royal Albert Hall in London, with the Yardbirds. Since then, Clapton has performed at the Hall over 200 times, and has stated that performing there is like "playing in my front room".

In March 1965, Clapton and the Yardbirds had their first major hit, "For Your Love", written by songwriter Graham Gouldman, who also wrote hit songs for Herman's Hermits and the Hollies (and later achieved success of his own as a member of 10cc). In part because of its success, the Yardbirds elected to move toward a pop-oriented sound, much to the annoyance of Clapton, who was devoted to the blues and not commercial success. He left the Yardbirds on the day that "For Your Love" went public, a move that left the band without its lead guitarist and most accomplished member. Clapton suggested fellow guitarist Jimmy Page as his replacement, but Page declined out of loyalty to Clapton, putting Jeff Beck forward. Beck and Page played together in the Yardbirds for a while, but Beck, Page, and Clapton were never in the group together. They first appeared together in 1983 on the 12-date benefit tour for Action for Research into multiple sclerosis, with the first date on 23 September at the Royal Albert Hall.

Clapton joined John Mayall & the Bluesbreakers in April 1965, only to quit a few months later. In June, Clapton was invited to jam with Jimmy Page, recording a number of tracks that were retroactively credited to the Immediate All-Stars. In the summer of 1965 he left for Greece with a band called the Glands, which included his old friend Ben Palmer on piano. After a car crash that killed the bassist and injured the guitarist of the Greek band the Juniors, on 17 October 1965 the surviving members played memorial shows in which Clapton played with the band. In October 1965 he rejoined John Mayall. In March 1966, while still a member of the Bluesbreakers, Clapton briefly collaborated on a side project with Jack Bruce and Steve Winwood among others, recording only a few tracks under the name Eric Clapton and the Powerhouse. During his second Bluesbreakers stint, Clapton gained a reputation as the best blues guitarist on the club circuit. Although Clapton gained fame for playing on the influential album Blues Breakers – John Mayall – With Eric Clapton, the album was not released until he had left the band for the last time in July 1966. The album itself is often called The Beano Album by fans because of its cover photograph showing Clapton reading the British children's comic The Beano.

Having swapped his Fender Telecaster and Vox AC30 amplifier for a 1960 Gibson Les Paul Standard guitar and Marshall amplifier, Clapton's sound and playing inspired the famous slogan "Clapton is God", spray-painted by an unknown admirer on a wall in Islington, North London, in 1967. The graffito was captured in a now-famous photograph, in which a dog is urinating on the wall. Clapton is reported to have been embarrassed by the slogan, saying in his The South Bank Show profile in 1987, "I never accepted that I was the greatest guitar player in the world. I always wanted to be the greatest guitar player in the world, but that's an ideal, and I accept it as an ideal".

=== Cream ===
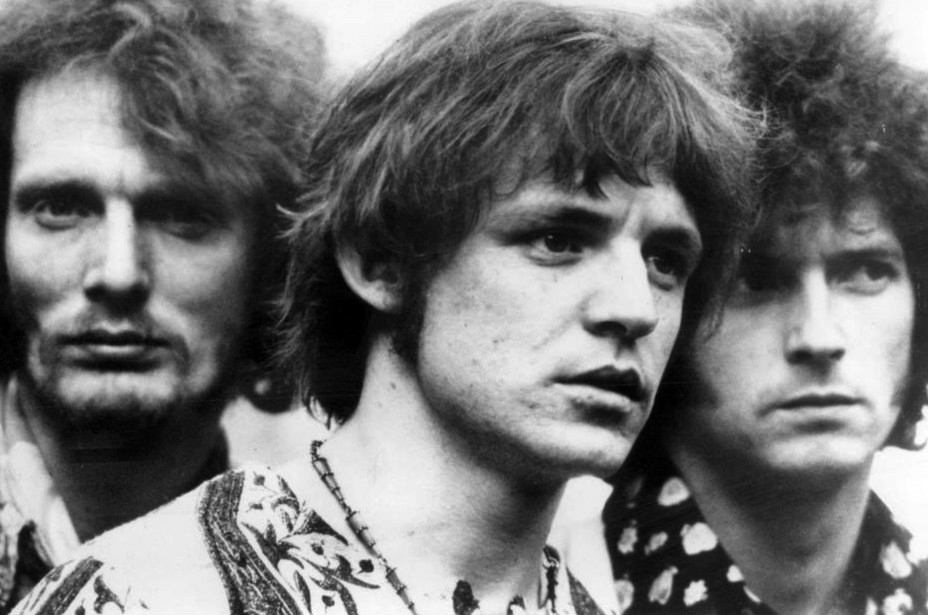
Clapton (right) as a member of Cream

Clapton left the Bluesbreakers in July 1966 (replaced by Peter Green) and was invited by drummer Ginger Baker to play in his newly formed band Cream, one of the earliest supergroups, with Jack Bruce on bass (Bruce was previously of the Bluesbreakers, the Graham Bond Organisation and Manfred Mann). Before the formation of Cream, Clapton was not well known in the United States; he left the Yardbirds before "For Your Love" hit the US top ten, and had yet to perform there. During his time with Cream, Clapton began to develop as a singer, songwriter and guitarist, though Bruce took most of the lead vocals and wrote the majority of the material with lyricist Pete Brown. Cream's first gig was an unofficial performance at the Twisted Wheel Club in Manchester on 29 July 1966 before their full debut two nights later at the National Jazz and Blues Festival in Windsor. Cream established its enduring legend with the high-volume blues jamming and extended solos of their live shows.

By early 1967, fans of the emerging blues-rock sound in the UK had begun to portray Clapton as Britain's top guitarist; however, he found himself rivalled by the emergence of Jimi Hendrix, an acid rock-infused guitarist who used wailing feedback and effects pedals to create new sounds for the instrument. Hendrix attended a performance of the newly formed Cream at the Central London Polytechnic on 1 October 1966, during which he sat in on a double-timed version of "Killing Floor". Top UK stars, including Clapton, Pete Townshend and members of the Rolling Stones and the Beatles, avidly attended Hendrix's early club performances. Hendrix's arrival had an immediate and major effect on the next phase of Clapton's career.

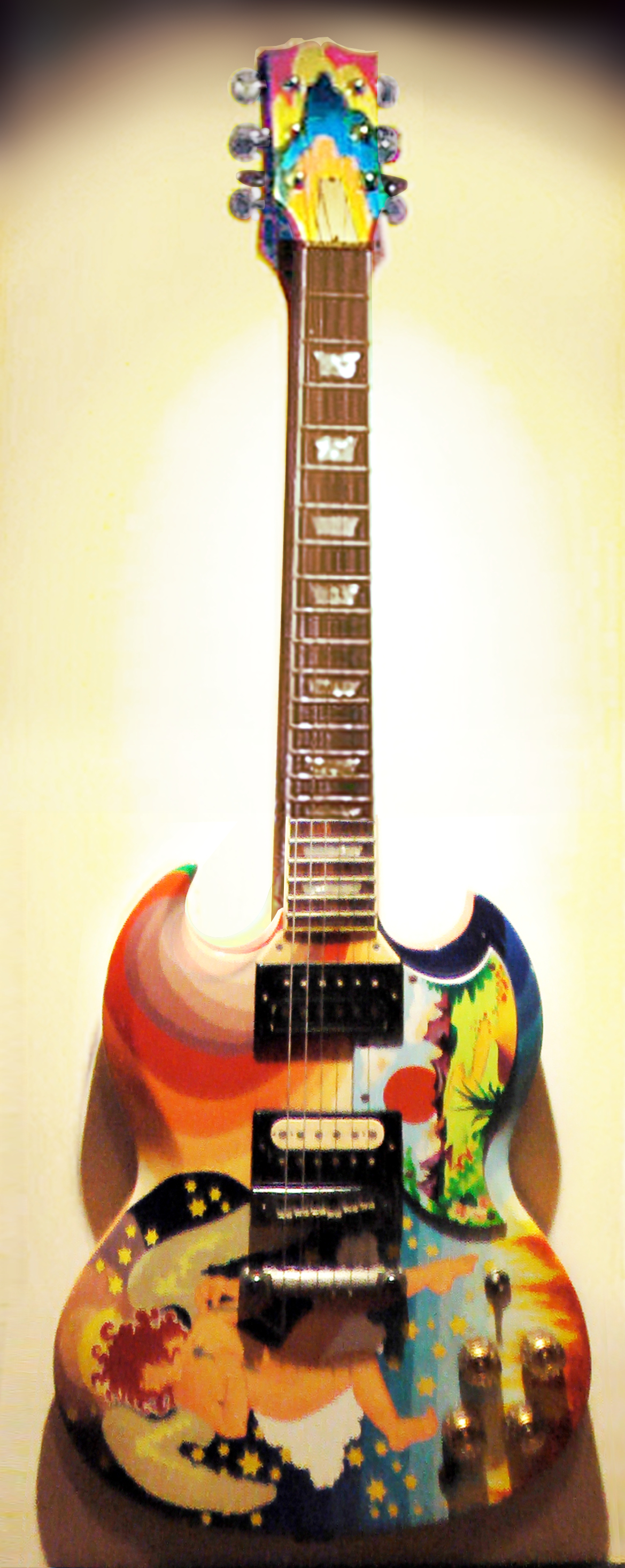
Clapton's The Fool guitar (replica shown), with its bright artwork and famous "woman tone", was symbolic of the 1960s psychedelic rock era.

Clapton first visited the United States while touring with Cream. In March 1967, Cream performed a nine-show stand at the RKO Theater in New York. Clapton's 1964 painted Gibson SG guitar – The Fool – a "psychedelic fantasy", according to Clapton, made its debut at the RKO Theater. Clapton used the guitar for most of Cream's recordings after Fresh Cream, particularly on Disraeli Gears, until the band broke up in 1968. One of the world's best-known guitars, it symbolises the psychedelic era. They recorded Disraeli Gears in New York from 11 to 15 May 1967. Cream's repertoire varied from hard rock ("I Feel Free") to lengthy blues-based instrumental jams ("Spoonful"). Disraeli Gears contained Clapton's searing guitar lines, Bruce's soaring vocals and prominent, fluid bass playing, and Baker's powerful, polyrhythmic jazz-influenced drumming. Together, Cream's talents secured them as an influential power trio. Clapton's voice can be heard on Frank Zappa's album We're Only in It for the Money, on the tracks "Are You Hung Up?" and "Nasal Retentive Calliope Music".

In 28 months, Cream had become a commercial success, selling millions of records and playing throughout the US and Europe. They redefined the instrumentalist's role in rock and were one of the first blues-rock bands to emphasise musical virtuosity and lengthy jazz-style improvisation sessions. Their US hit singles include "Sunshine of Your Love" (No. 5, 1968), "White Room" (No. 6, 1968) and "Crossroads" (No. 28, 1969) – a live version of Robert Johnson's "Cross Road Blues". Though Cream were hailed as one of the greatest groups of its day, and the adulation of Clapton as a guitar legend reached new heights, the supergroup was short-lived. Drug and alcohol use escalated tension between the three members, and conflicts between Bruce and Baker eventually led to Cream's demise. A strongly critical Rolling Stone review of a concert of the group's second headlining US tour was another significant factor in the trio's demise, and it affected Clapton profoundly. Clapton has also credited Music from Big Pink, the debut album of The Band, and its revolutionary Americana sound as influencing his decision to leave Cream.

Cream's farewell album, Goodbye, comprising live performances recorded at The Forum, Los Angeles, on 19 October 1968, was released shortly after Cream disbanded. It also spawned the studio single "Badge", co-written by Clapton and George Harrison (Clapton had met and become close friends with Harrison after the Beatles shared a bill with the Clapton-era Yardbirds at the London Palladium). In 1968, Clapton played the lead guitar solo on Harrison's "While My Guitar Gently Weeps", from the Beatles' self-titled double album (also known as the "White Album"). Harrison's debut solo album, Wonderwall Music (1968), became the first of many Harrison solo records to include Clapton on guitar. Clapton went largely uncredited for his contributions to Harrison's albums due to contractual restraints, and Harrison was credited as "L'Angelo Misterioso" for his contributions to the song "Badge" on Goodbye. The pair often played live together as each other's guest. A year after Harrison's death in 2001, Clapton was musical director for the Concert for George.

In January 1969, when the Beatles were recording and filming what became Let It Be, tensions became so acute that Harrison quit the group for several days, prompting John Lennon to suggest they complete the project with Clapton if Harrison did not return. Michael Lindsay-Hogg, television director of the recording sessions for Let It Be, later recalled: "I was there when John mentioned Clapton – but that wasn't going to happen. Would Eric have become a Beatle? No. Paul [McCartney] didn't want to go there. He didn't want them to break up. Then George came back." Clapton was on good terms with all four of the Beatles; in December 1968 he had played with Lennon at The Rolling Stones Rock and Roll Circus as part of the one-off group the Dirty Mac.

Cream briefly reunited in 1993 to perform at the ceremony inducting them into the Rock and Roll Hall of Fame. A full reunion took place in May 2005, with Clapton, Bruce and Baker playing four sold-out concerts at London's Royal Albert Hall, and three shows at New York's Madison Square Garden that October. Recordings from the London shows, Royal Albert Hall London May 2-3-5-6, 2005, were released on CD, LP and DVD in late 2005.

=== Blind Faith ===
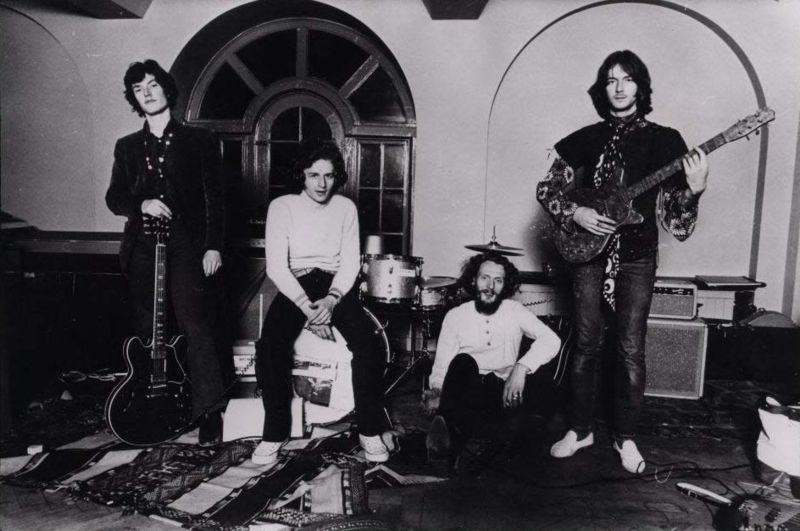
Blind Faith in 1969, with Clapton standing far right

Clapton's next group, Blind Faith, formed in 1969, was composed of Cream drummer Ginger Baker, Steve Winwood of Traffic, and Ric Grech of Family, and yielded one LP and one arena-circuit tour. The supergroup debuted before 100,000 fans in London's Hyde Park on 7 June 1969. They performed several dates in Scandinavia and began a sold-out American tour in July before their only album was released. The LP Blind Faith consisted of just six songs, one of them the hit "Can't Find My Way Home". Another, "Presence of the Lord", is the first song credited solely to Clapton. The album's jacket image of a topless pubescent girl was deemed controversial in the US and was replaced by a photograph of the band. Blind Faith dissolved after less than seven months.

=== Delaney & Bonnie and first solo album ===
Clapton subsequently toured as a sideman for an act that had opened for Blind Faith, Delaney and Bonnie and Friends. He also performed as a member of Lennon's Plastic Ono Band at the Toronto Rock and Roll Revival in September 1969, a recording from which was released as the album Live Peace in Toronto 1969. On 30 September, Clapton played lead guitar on Lennon's second solo single, "Cold Turkey". On 15 December that year, Clapton performed with Lennon, Harrison and others as the Plastic Ono Supergroup at a fundraiser for UNICEF in London.

Delaney Bramlett encouraged Clapton in his singing and writing. Using the Bramletts' backing group and an all-star cast of session players (including Leon Russell and Stephen Stills), Clapton recorded his first solo album during two brief tour hiatuses, titled Eric Clapton. Delaney Bramlett co-wrote six of the songs with Clapton, also producing the LP, and Bonnie Bramlett co-wrote "Let It Rain". The album yielded the unexpected US No. 18 hit, J. J. Cale's "After Midnight". Clapton also worked with much of Delaney and Bonnie's band to record George Harrison's All Things Must Pass in spring 1970.

During this period, Clapton also recorded with artists such as Dr. John, Leon Russell, Billy Preston, Ringo Starr and Dave Mason. With Chicago blues artist Howlin' Wolf, he recorded The London Howlin' Wolf Sessions, that also included long-time Wolf guitarist Hubert Sumlin, Winwood, Starr, and members of the Rolling Stones. Despite the superstar line-up, critic Cub Koda noted: "Even Eric Clapton, who usually welcomes any chance to play with one of his idols, has criticized this album repeatedly in interviews, which speaks volumes in and of itself." Other noted recordings from this period include Clapton's guitar work on "Go Back Home" from Stephen Stills' self-titled first solo album.

=== Derek and the Dominos ===
With the intention of counteracting the "star" cult faction that had begun to form around him, Clapton assembled a new band composed of Delaney and Bonnie's former rhythm section, Bobby Whitlock as keyboardist and vocalist, Carl Radle as the bassist, and drummer Jim Gordon, with Clapton playing guitar. It was his intention to show that he need not fill a starring role, and functioned well as a member of an ensemble. During this period, Clapton was increasingly influenced by The Band and their 1968 album Music from Big Pink, saying: "What I appreciated about the Band was that they were more concerned with songs and singing. They would have three- and four-part harmonies, and the guitar was put back into perspective as being accompaniment. That suited me well, because I had gotten so tired of the virtuosity – or pseudo-virtuosity – thing of long, boring guitar solos just because they were expected. The Band brought things back into perspective. The priority was the song."

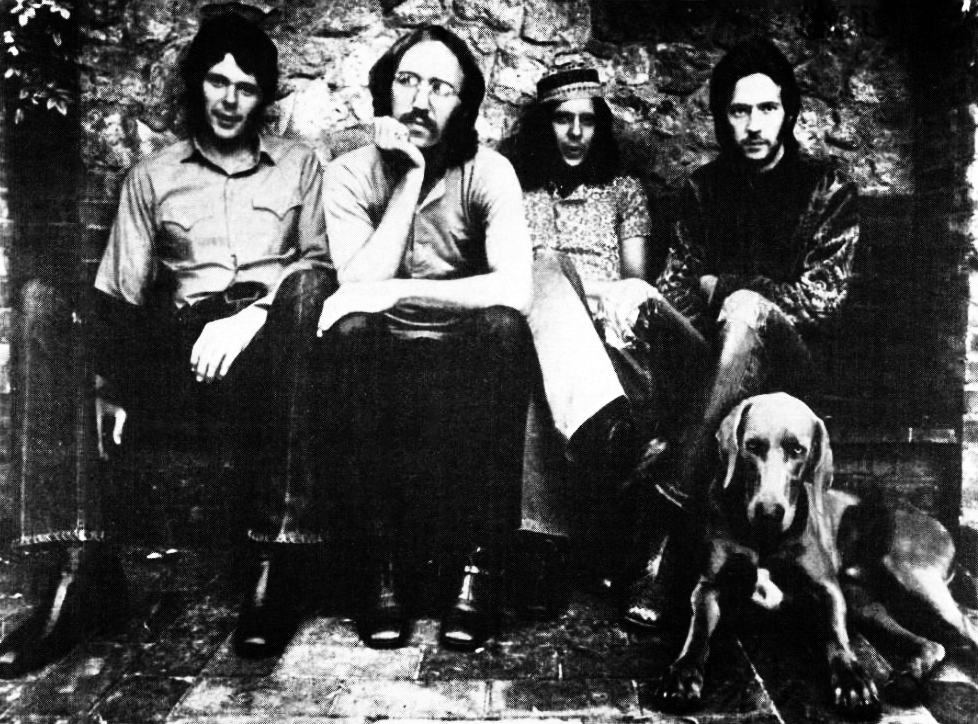
Clapton (right) with Derek and the Dominos

The band was originally called "Eric Clapton and Friends". The eventual name was a fluke that occurred when the band's provisional name of "Del and the Dynamos" was misread as Derek and the Dominos. Clapton's biography states that Tony Ashton of Ashton, Gardner and Dyke told Clapton to call the band "Del and the Dominos", since "Del" was his nickname for Eric Clapton. Del and Eric were combined and the final name became "Derek and the Dominos".

Clapton's close friendship with George Harrison brought him into contact with Harrison's wife, Pattie Boyd, with whom he became deeply infatuated. When she spurned his advances, Clapton's unrequited affections prompted most of the material for the Dominos' album Layla and Other Assorted Love Songs (1970). Heavily blues-influenced, the album features the twin lead guitars of Clapton and Duane Allman, with Allman's slide guitar as a key ingredient of the sound. Working at Criteria Studios in Miami with Atlantic Records producer Tom Dowd, who had worked with Clapton on Cream's Disraeli Gears, the band recorded a double album.

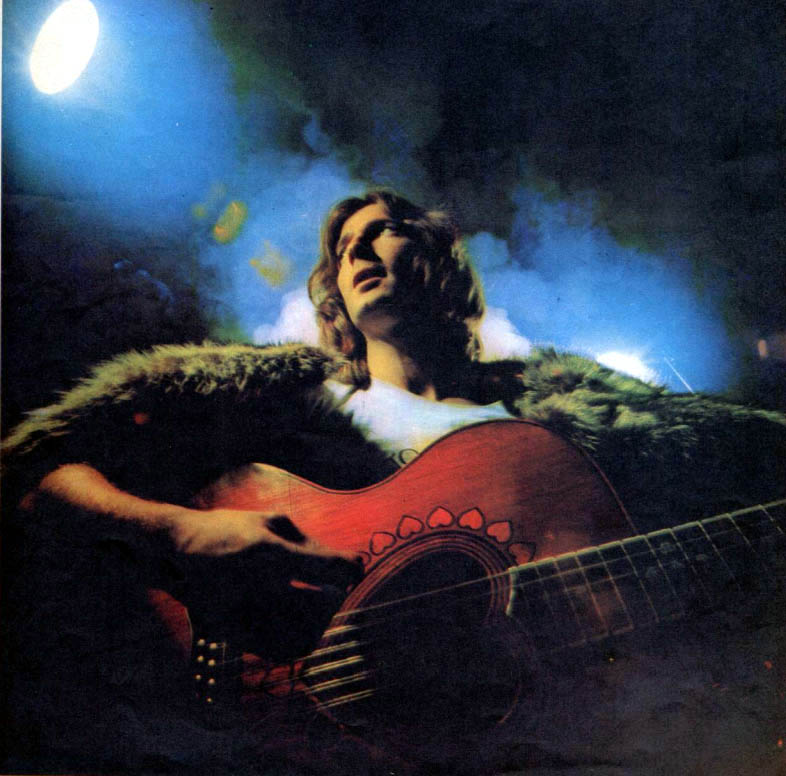
Clapton in 1971

The album contained the hit love song "Layla", inspired by the classical poet of Persian literature, Nizami Ganjavi's The Story of Layla and Majnun, a copy of which Ian Dallas had given to Clapton. The book moved Clapton profoundly, as it was the tale of a young man who fell hopelessly in love with a beautiful, unavailable woman and went crazy because he could not marry her. The two parts of "Layla" were recorded in separate sessions: the opening guitar section was recorded first, and for the second section, laid down a few weeks later, drummer Jim Gordon played the piano part for the melody, which he claimed to have written (though Bobby Whitlock stated that Rita Coolidge wrote it).

The Layla LP was actually recorded by a five-piece version of the group, thanks to the unforeseen inclusion of guitarist Duane Allman of the Allman Brothers Band. A few days into the Layla sessions, Dowd – who was also producing the Allmans – invited Clapton to an Allman Brothers outdoor concert in Miami. The two guitarists met first on stage, then played all night in the studio, and became friends. Duane first added his slide guitar to "Tell the Truth" and "Nobody Knows You When You're Down and Out". In four days, the five-piece Dominos recorded "Key to the Highway", "Have You Ever Loved a Woman" (a blues standard popularised by Freddie King and others) and "Why Does Love Got to be So Sad?" In September, Duane briefly left the sessions for gigs with his own band, and the four-piece Dominos recorded "I Looked Away", "Bell Bottom Blues" and "Keep on Growing". Allman returned to record "I Am Yours", "Anyday" and "It's Too Late". On 9 September, they recorded Hendrix's "Little Wing" and the title track. The following day, the final track, "It's Too Late", was recorded.

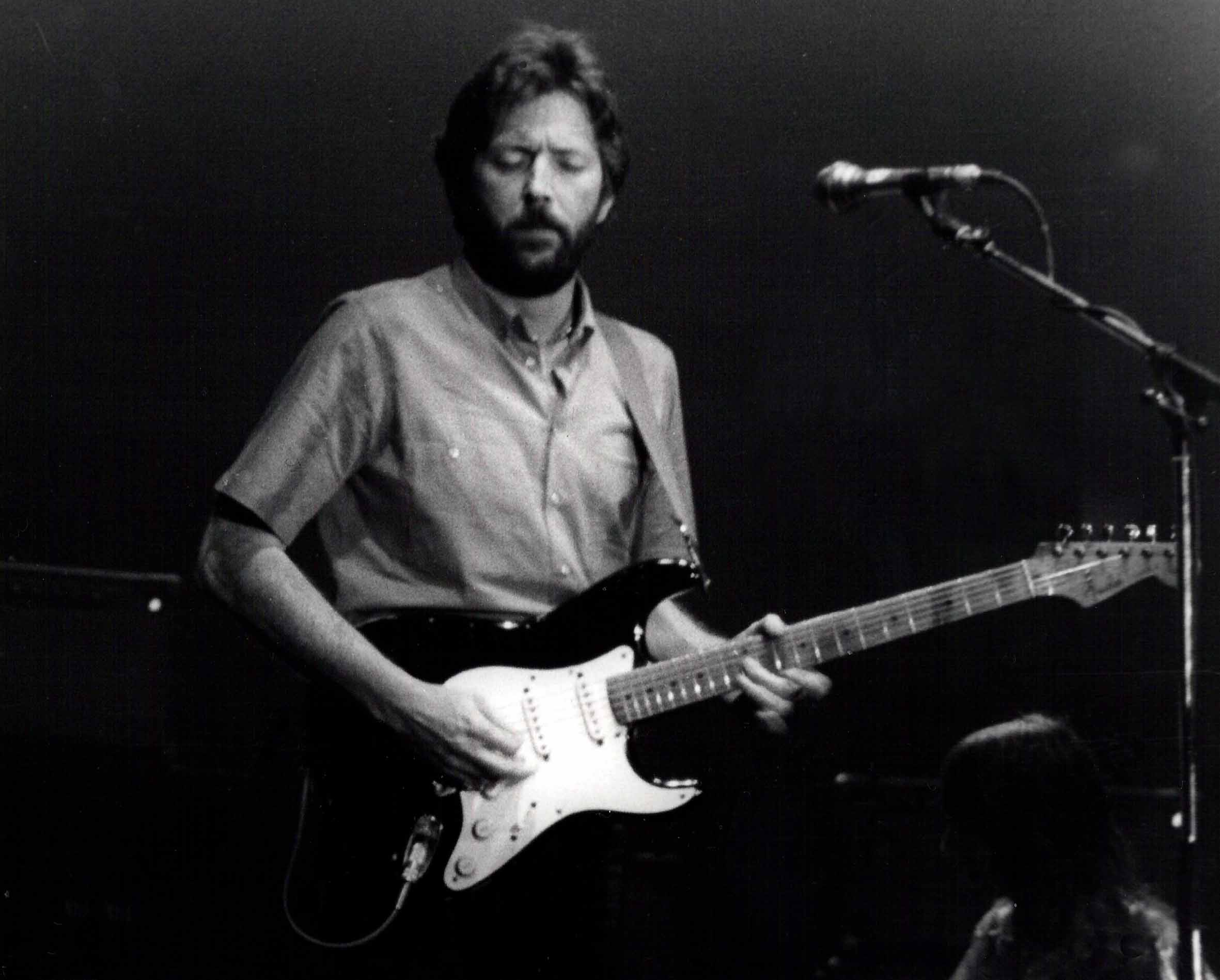
Eric Clapton in Barcelona, 1974

Tragedy dogged the group throughout its brief career. During the sessions, Clapton was devastated by news of the death of Jimi Hendrix; eight days previously the band had cut a cover of "Little Wing" as a tribute. On 17 September 1970, one day before Hendrix's death, Clapton had purchased a left-handed Fender Stratocaster that he had planned to give to Hendrix as a birthday gift. Adding to Clapton's woes, Layla received only lukewarm reviews upon release. The shaken group undertook a US tour without Allman, who had returned to the Allman Brothers Band. Despite Clapton's later admission that the tour took place amid a blizzard of drugs and alcohol, it resulted in the live double album In Concert.

Recording of a second Dominos studio album was underway when a clash of egos took place and Clapton walked out, thus disbanding the group. Allman was killed in a motorcycle accident on 29 October 1971. Clapton wrote later in his autobiography that he and Allman were inseparable during the Layla sessions in Florida; he talked about Allman as the "musical brother I'd never had but wished I did". Although Radle remained Clapton's bass player until the summer of 1979 (Radle died in May 1980 from the effects of alcohol and narcotics), it was not until 2003 that Clapton and Whitlock appeared together again; Clapton guested on Whitlock's appearance on the Later with Jools Holland show. Another tragic footnote to the Dominos story was the fate of drummer Jim Gordon, who had undiagnosed schizophrenia and years later murdered his mother during a psychotic episode. Gordon was confined to 16-years-to-life imprisonment, later being moved to a mental institution, where he remained for the rest of his life.

=== Personal problems and early solo success ===
Clapton's career successes in the 1970s were in stark contrast with the struggles he coped with in his personal life, which was troubled by romantic longings and drug and alcohol addiction. Still infatuated with Boyd and torn by his friendship with Harrison, he withdrew from recording and touring to isolation in his Surrey residence as the Dominos broke up. He nursed a heroin addiction, which resulted in a lengthy career hiatus interrupted only by performing at Harrison's Concert for Bangladesh benefit shows in New York in August 1971; there, he passed out on stage, was revived, and managed to finish his performance. In January 1973, the Who's Pete Townshend organised a comeback concert for Clapton at London's Rainbow Theatre, titled the "Rainbow Concert", to help Clapton kick his addiction. Clapton returned the favour by playing "The Preacher" in Ken Russell's film version of the Who's Tommy in 1975. His appearance in the film (performing "Eyesight to the Blind") is notable as he is clearly wearing a fake beard in some shots, the result of deciding to shave off his real beard after the initial takes in an attempt to force the director to remove his earlier scene from the film and leave the set.

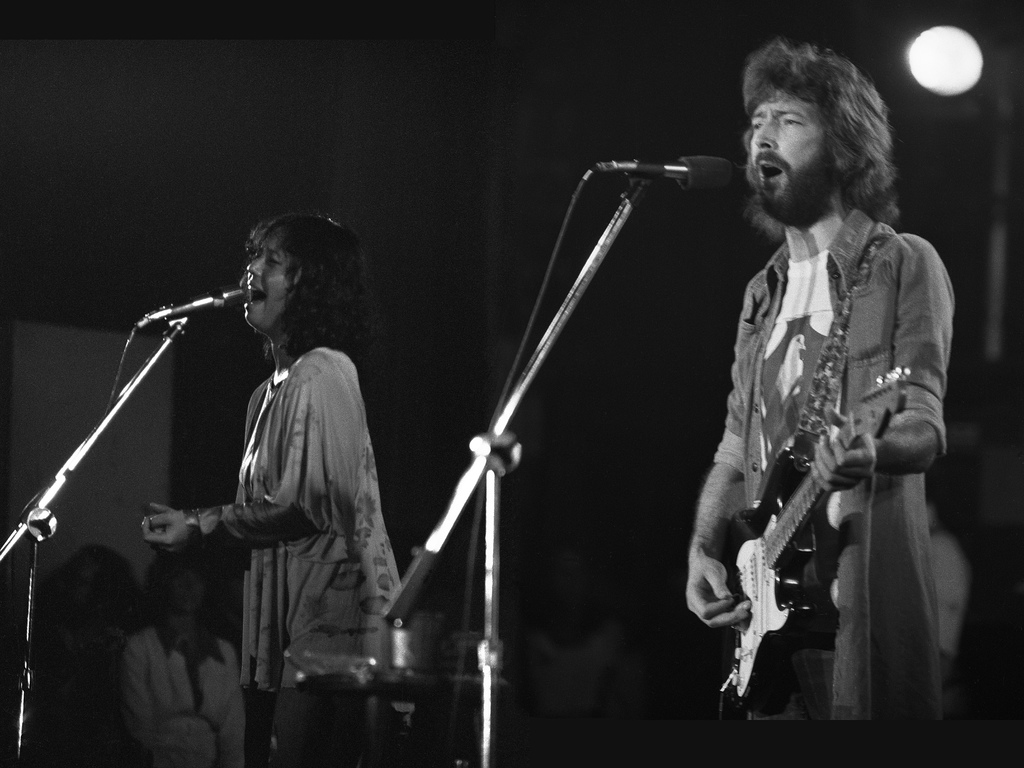
Yvonne Elliman with Clapton promoting 461 Ocean Boulevard in 1974

In 1974, Clapton started living with Boyd (they would not marry until 1979) and was no longer using heroin (although he gradually began to drink heavily). He assembled a low-key touring band that included Radle, Miami guitarist George Terry, keyboardist Dick Sims (who died in 2011), drummer Jamie Oldaker, and vocalists Yvonne Elliman and Marcy Levy (also known as Marcella Detroit). With this band Clapton recorded 461 Ocean Boulevard (1974), an album with an emphasis on more compact songs and fewer guitar solos; the cover version of "I Shot the Sheriff" was Clapton's first number one hit. The 1975 album There's One in Every Crowd continued this trend. The album's original title, The World's Greatest Guitar Player (There's One in Every Crowd), was changed before pressing, as it was felt its ironic intention would be misunderstood. The band toured the world and subsequently released the 1975 live LP E. C. Was Here. Clapton continued to release albums and toured regularly. Highlights of the period include No Reason to Cry (a collaboration with Bob Dylan and The Band); Slowhand, which contained "Wonderful Tonight" and a second J. J. Cale cover, "Cocaine". In 1976, he performed as one of a string of notable guests at the farewell performance of The Band, filmed in a Martin Scorsese documentary titled The Last Waltz.

=== Continued success ===
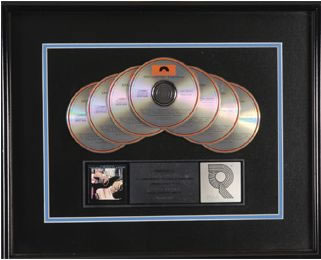
A seven-times Platinum RIAA certification for the album Timepieces: The Best of Eric Clapton (1982)

In 1981, Clapton was invited by producer Martin Lewis to appear at the Amnesty International benefit The Secret Policeman's Other Ball in London. Clapton accepted the invitation and teamed up with Jeff Beck to perform a series of duets – reportedly their first ever billed stage collaboration. Three of the performances were released on the album of the show, and one of the songs appeared in the film. The performances at London's Drury Lane theatre heralded a return to form and prominence for Clapton in the new decade. Many factors had influenced Clapton's comeback, including his "deepening commitment to Christianity", to which he had converted prior to his heroin addiction.

After calling his manager and admitting he was an alcoholic, Clapton flew to Minneapolis–Saint Paul in January 1982 and checked in at Hazelden Treatment Center, located in Center City, Minnesota. On the flight over, Clapton indulged in a large number of drinks, for fear he would never be able to drink again. Clapton wrote in his autobiography:

In the lowest moments of my life, the only reason I didn't commit suicide was that I knew I wouldn't be able to drink any more if I was dead. It was the only thing I thought was worth living for, and the idea that people were about to try and remove me from alcohol was so terrible that I drank and drank and drank, and they had to practically carry me into the clinic.

After being discharged, it was recommended by doctors of Hazelden that Clapton not partake in any activities that would act as triggers for his alcoholism or stress. Nonetheless, Clapton would go back to the Hazelden Treatment Center in November 1987. He has stayed sober ever since. A few months after his discharge from his first rehab, Clapton began working on his next album, against doctors' orders. Working with Tom Dowd, he produced what he thought as his "most forced" album to date, Money and Cigarettes. Clapton chose the name of the album "because that's all I saw myself having left" after his first rehabilitation from alcoholism.

In 1984, he performed on former Pink Floyd member Roger Waters' solo album The Pros and Cons of Hitch Hiking, and participated in the supporting tour. Since then Waters and Clapton have had a close relationship. In 2005, they performed together for the Tsunami Relief Fund. In 2006, they performed at the Highclere Castle in aid of the Countryside Alliance and played two set pieces of "Wish You Were Here" and "Comfortably Numb". Clapton, now a regular charity performer, played at the Live Aid concert at John F. Kennedy Stadium in Philadelphia on 13 July 1985, playing with Phil Collins, Tim Renwick, Chris Stainton, Jamie Oldaker, Marcy Levy, Shaun Murphy and Donald 'Duck' Dunn. When offered a slot close to peak viewing hours, he was apparently flattered. His album output continued in the 1980s, including two produced with Phil Collins, 1985's Behind the Sun, which produced the hits "Forever Man" and "She's Waiting", and 1986's August.

August was suffused with Collins's trademark drum and horn sound, and became Clapton's biggest seller in the UK to date, matching his highest chart position, number 3. The album's first track, the hit "It's in the Way That You Use It", appeared in the Tom Cruise–Paul Newman film The Color of Money. The songs "Tearing Us Apart" (with Tina Turner) and "Miss You" continued Clapton's more angry sound. This rebound kicked off Clapton's two-year period of touring with Collins and their August collaborators, bassist Nathan East and keyboard player/songwriter Greg Phillinganes. While on tour for August, two concert videos were recorded of the four-man band: Eric Clapton Live from Montreux and Eric Clapton and Friends. Clapton later remade "After Midnight" as a single and a promotional track for the Michelob beer brand, which had also used earlier songs by Collins and Steve Winwood. Clapton won a British Academy Television Award for his collaboration with Michael Kamen on the score for the 1985 BBC television thriller series Edge of Darkness. At the 1987 Brit Awards in London, Clapton was awarded the prize for Outstanding Contribution to Music. In 1987, he played on George Harrison's album Cloud Nine, contributing guitar to its title track "Cloud 9", "That's What It Takes", "Devil's Radio" and "Wreck of the Hesperus".

Clapton also got together with the Bee Gees for charity. The supergroup called itself the Bunburys, and recorded a charity album with the proceeds going to the Bunbury Cricket Club in Cheshire, which plays exhibition cricket matches to raise money for nonprofit organisations in England. The Bunburys recorded three songs for The Bunbury Tails: "We're the Bunburys", "Bunbury Afternoon" and "Fight (No Matter How Long)". The last song also appeared on The 1988 Summer Olympics Album and went to No. 8 on the rock music chart. Clapton played at the cricket club's 25th anniversary celebrations in 2011, which were held at London's Grosvenor House Hotel. In 1988, he played with Dire Straits and Elton John at the Nelson Mandela 70th Birthday Tribute at Wembley Stadium and the Prince's Trust rock gala at the Royal Albert Hall. In 1989, Clapton released Journeyman, an album that covered a wide range of styles, including blues, jazz, soul and pop. Collaborators included George Harrison, Phil Collins, Daryl Hall, Chaka Khan, Mick Jones, David Sanborn and Robert Cray. The song "Bad Love" was released as a single and later won the Grammy Award for Best Male Rock Vocal Performance.

=== Son's death, "Tears in Heaven" ===
I remember putting the phone down and calmly walking from my hotel [in N.Y.C.] to that place as if nothing happened. And I walked past the street and, this is a terrible thing of shame for me, which I'll never, ever perhaps recover from and seeing that, seeing a crowd of people and a paramedic van and knowing that he was there [trying to be resuscitated] and walking by, I'll punish myself forever about why didn't I run? Why didn't I go to see him? … the truth is I couldn't. I was so frightened.

— Eric Clapton, as quoted by Emma Kershaw of People (3 February 2025)

The 1990s brought a series of 32 concerts to the Royal Albert Hall, such as the 24 Nights series of concerts that took place around January through February 1990, and February to March 1991. On 30 June 1990, Dire Straits, Clapton and Elton John made a guest appearance in the Nordoff-Robbins charity show held at Knebworth in England. On 27 August 1990, fellow blues guitarist Stevie Ray Vaughan, who was touring with Clapton, and three members of their road crew were killed in a helicopter crash between concerts. Then, on 20 March 1991, Clapton's four-year-old son, Conor, died after falling from the 53rd-floor window of his mother's friend's New York City apartment at 117 East 57th Street. Clapton was staying at a nearby hotel at the time of his son's death, and was preparing to pick him up for lunch and a visit to the Central Park Zoo. He was informed of the incident through a hysterical phone call by Lory Del Santo, Conor's mother. Once comprehending what was happening, he described feeling like he "went off the edge of the world," and promptly arrived at the scene, feeling "like [he] had walked into someone else's life." The first person to offer condolences towards Clapton was friend and fellow guitarist Keith Richards, who himself had lost his young son Tara in 1976. Conor's funeral took place on 28 March at St Mary Magdalene's Church in Clapton's home village in Ripley, Surrey, with Conor buried in the church graveyard. After his son's death Clapton began attending AA meetings. In 1991, Clapton appeared on Richie Sambora's album, Stranger in This Town, in a song dedicated to him, called "Mr. Bluesman". He contributed guitar and vocals to "Runaway Train", a duet with Elton John on the latter's The One album the following year.

Clapton's grief was expressed in the song "Tears in Heaven", which was co-written by Will Jennings. At the 35th Annual Grammy Awards, Clapton received six Grammys for the single "Tears in Heaven" and his Unplugged album, for which Clapton performed live in front of a small audience on 16 January 1992 at Bray Film Studios in Windsor, Berkshire, England. The album reached number one on the Billboard 200, and is certified Diamond by the RIAA for selling over 10 million copies in the US. It reached number two in the UK Albums Chart and is certified four times platinum in the UK. On 9 September 1992, Clapton performed "Tears in Heaven" at the 1992 MTV Video Music Awards, and won the award for Best Male Video.

I almost subconsciously used music for myself as a healing agent, and lo and behold, it worked ... I have got a great deal of happiness and a great deal of healing from music.

— Clapton on the healing process in writing "Tears in Heaven".

In 1992, Clapton received the Ivor Novello Award for Lifetime Achievement from the British Academy of Songwriters, Composers and Authors. In October 1992 Clapton was among the dozens of artists performing at Bob Dylan's 30th Anniversary Concert Celebration. Recorded at Madison Square Garden in New York City, the live two-disk CD/DVD captured a show full of celebrities performing classic Dylan songs, with Clapton playing the lead on a nearly 7-minute version of Dylan's "Knockin' on Heaven's Door" as part of the finale. While Clapton played acoustic guitar on Unplugged, his 1994 album From the Cradle contained new versions of old blues standards, highlighted by his electric guitar playing. In 1995, Clapton for the first and only time appeared on a UK No. 1 single, collaborating with Cher, Chrissie Hynde, and Neneh Cherry on a solo to a cover of "Love Can Build a Bridge" released in aid of the British charity telethon Comic Relief.

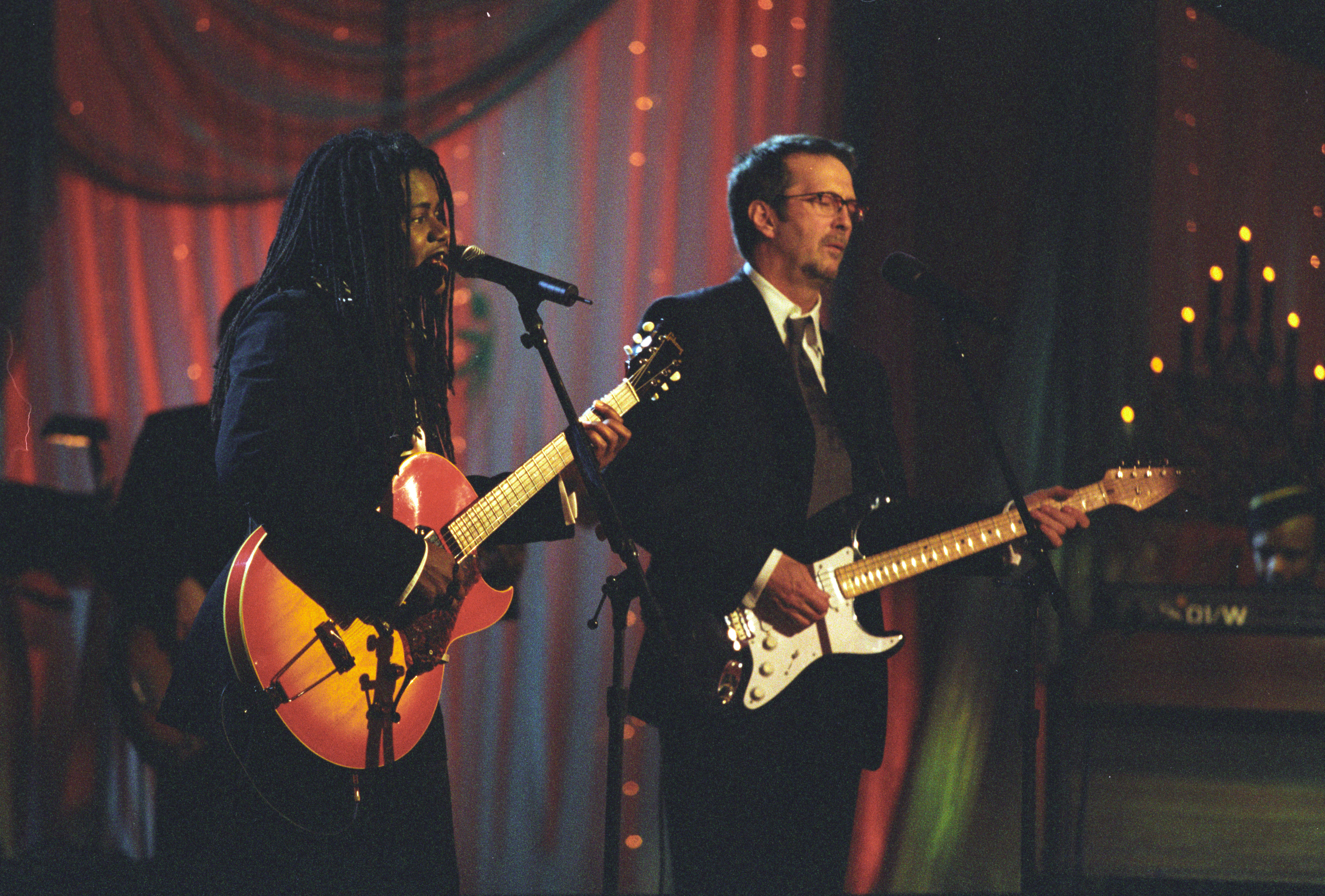
Clapton and Tracy Chapman on stage at a White House Special Olympics dinner, December 1998

On 12 September 1996 Clapton played a party for Armani at New York City's Lexington Armory with Greg Phillinganes, Nathan East and Steve Gadd. Sheryl Crow appeared on one number, performing "Tearing Us Apart", a track from August, which was first performed by Tina Turner during the Prince's Trust All-Star Rock show in 1986. It was Clapton's sole US appearance that year, following the open-air concert held at Hyde Park. The concert was taped and the footage was released both on VHS video cassette and later, on DVD. Clapton's 1996 recording of the Wayne Kirkpatrick/Gordon Kennedy/Tommy Sims tune "Change the World" (on the soundtrack of the film Phenomenon) won the Grammy Award for Song of the Year in 1997, the same year he recorded Retail Therapy (an album of electronic music with Simon Climie under the pseudonym TDF). On 15 September 1997, Clapton appeared at the Music for Montserrat concert at the Royal Albert Hall, London, performing "Layla" and "Same Old Blues" before finishing with "Hey Jude" alongside fellow English artists Paul McCartney, Elton John, Phil Collins, Mark Knopfler and Sting. That autumn, Clapton released the album Pilgrim, the first record containing new material for almost a decade.

In 1996, Clapton had a relationship with singer-songwriter Sheryl Crow. They remain friends, and Clapton appeared as a guest on Crow's Central Park Concert. The duo performed a Cream hit single, "White Room". Later, Clapton and Crow performed an alternate version of "Tulsa Time" with other guitar legends at the Crossroads Guitar Festival in June 2007 as well as Robert Johnson's blues classic "Crossroads" at London's Hyde Park in August 2008 with John Mayer and Robert Randolph.

At the 41st Annual Grammy Awards on 24 February 1999, Clapton received his third Grammy Award for Best Male Pop Vocal Performance, for his song "My Father's Eyes". In October 1999, the compilation album, Clapton Chronicles: The Best of Eric Clapton, was released, which contained a new song, "Blue Eyes Blue", that also appears in soundtrack for the film, Runaway Bride. Clapton finished the twentieth century with collaborations with Carlos Santana and B.B. King. Clapton looked up to King and had always wanted to make an album with him, while King said of Clapton, "I admire the man. I think he's No. 1 in rock 'n' roll as a guitarist and No. 1 as a great person."

=== Collaboration albums ===
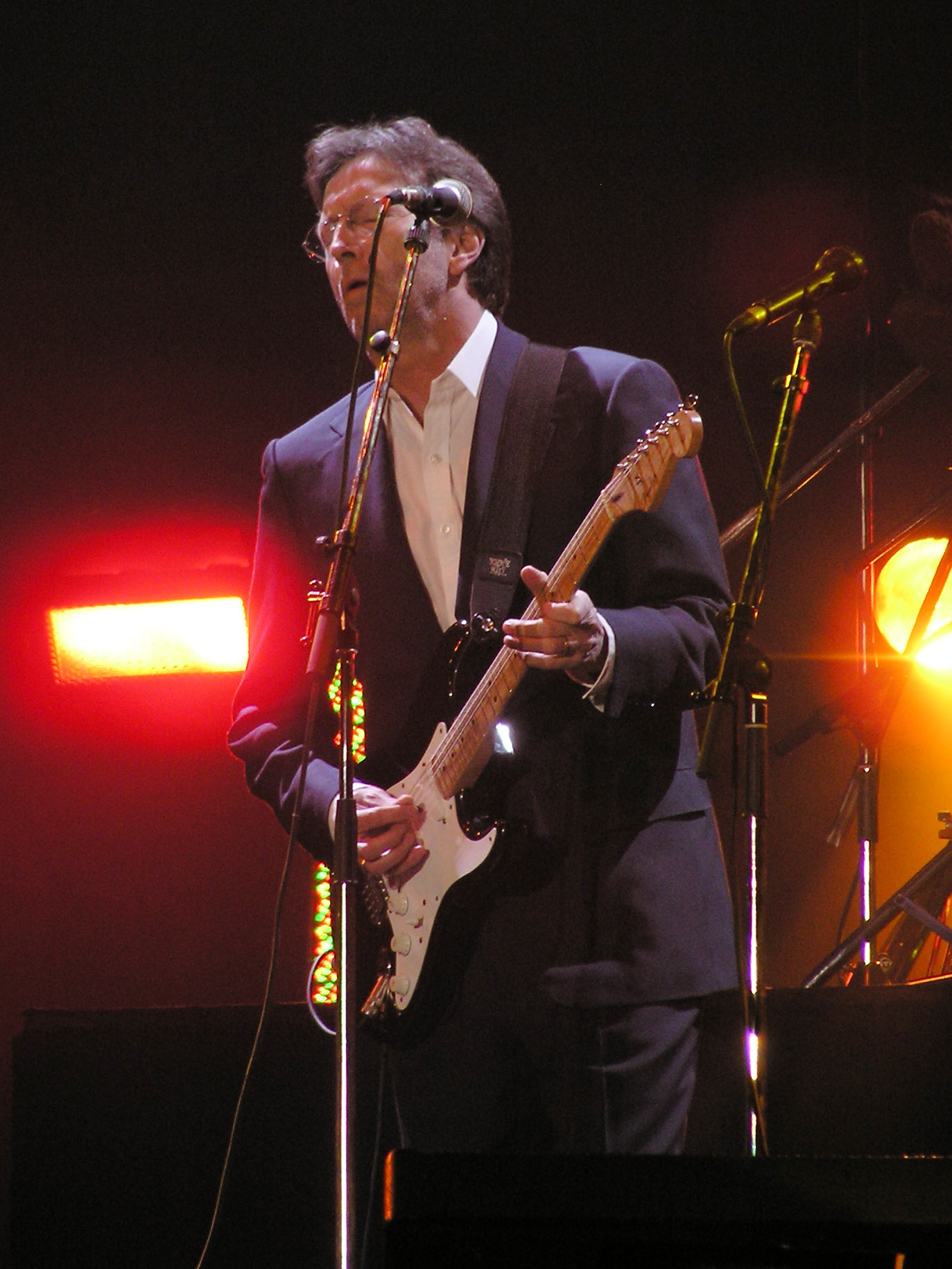
Clapton performing for Tsunami Relief Cardiff at the Millennium Stadium in Cardiff, Wales, on 22 January 2005

Clapton released the album Reptile in March 2001. One month after the 11 September attacks, Clapton appeared at the Concert for New York City, performing alongside Buddy Guy. An event marking the Golden Jubilee of Queen Elizabeth II in June 2002, Clapton performed "Layla" and "While My Guitar Gently Weeps" at the Party at the Palace concert in the grounds of Buckingham Palace. On 29 November 2002, the Concert for George was held at the Royal Albert Hall, a tribute to George Harrison, who had died a year earlier of lung cancer. Clapton was a performer and the musical director. The concert included Paul McCartney, Ringo Starr, Jeff Lynne, Tom Petty and the Heartbreakers, Ravi Shankar, Gary Brooker, Billy Preston, Joe Brown and Dhani Harrison. In 2004, Clapton released two albums of covers of songs by bluesman Robert Johnson, Me and Mr. Johnson and Sessions for Robert J. Guitarist Doyle Bramhall II worked on the album with Clapton (after opening Clapton's 2001 tour with his band Smokestack) and joined him on his 2004 tour. In 2004, Rolling Stone ranked Clapton No. 53 on their list of the "100 Greatest Artists of All Time". Other media appearances include the Toots & the Maytals Grammy award-winning album True Love, where he played guitar on the track "Pressure Drop".

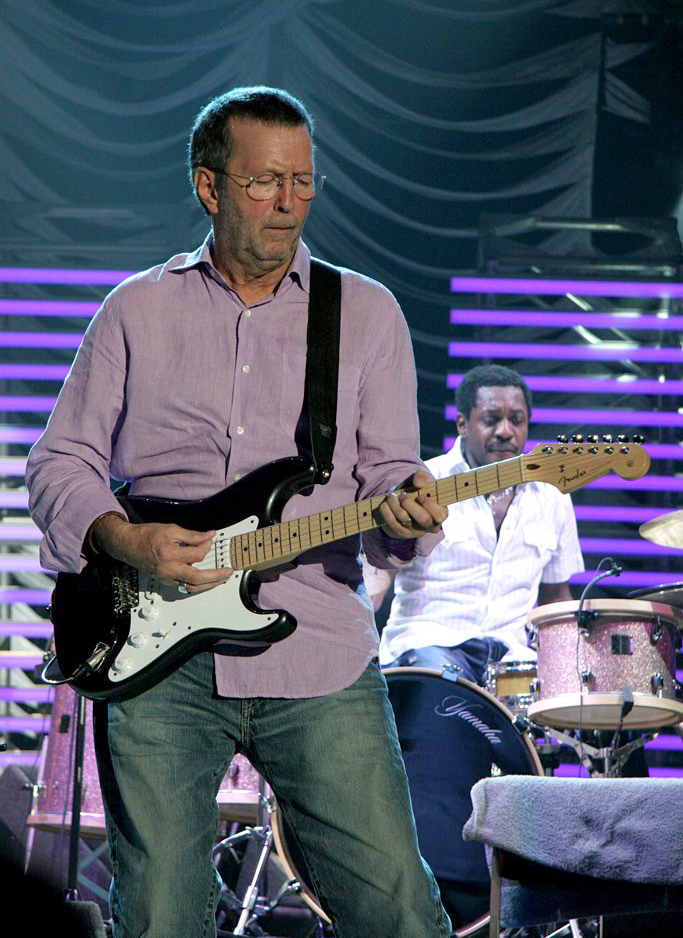
Clapton performing at the Ahoy Arena of Rotterdam on 1 June 2006

On 22 January 2005, Clapton performed in the Tsunami Relief Concert held at the Millennium Stadium in Cardiff, in aid of the victims of the 2004 Indian Ocean earthquake. In May 2005, Clapton, Jack Bruce, and Ginger Baker reunited as Cream for a series of concerts at the Royal Albert Hall in London. Concert recordings were released on CD and DVD. Later, Cream performed in New York at Madison Square Garden. Clapton's first album of new original material in nearly five years, Back Home, was released on Reprise Records on 30 August.

A collaboration with guitarist J. J. Cale, The Road to Escondido, was released on 7 November 2006, featuring Derek Trucks and Billy Preston (Preston had also been a part of Clapton's 2004 touring band). He invited Trucks to join his band for his 2006–2007 world tour. Bramhall remained, giving Clapton three elite guitarists in his band, allowing him to revisit many Derek and the Dominos songs that he hadn't played in decades. Trucks became the third member of the Allman Brothers Band to tour supporting Clapton, the second being pianist/keyboardist Chuck Leavell, who appeared on the MTV Unplugged album and the 24 Nights performances at the Royal Albert Hall, London in 1990 and 1991, as well as Clapton's 1992 US tour.

On 20 May 2006, Clapton performed with Queen drummer Roger Taylor and former Pink Floyd bassist/songwriter Roger Waters at Highclere Castle, Hampshire, in support of the Countryside Alliance, which promotes issues relating to the British countryside. On 13 August 2006, Clapton made a guest appearance at the Bob Dylan concert in Columbus, Ohio, playing guitar on three songs in Jimmie Vaughan's opening act. The chemistry between Trucks and Clapton convinced him to invite the Derek Trucks Band to open for Clapton's set at his 2007 Crossroads Guitar Festival. Trucks remained on set and performed with Clapton's band throughout his performances. The rights to Clapton's official memoirs, written by Christopher Simon Sykes and published in 2007, were sold at the 2005 Frankfurt Book Fair for US$4 million.

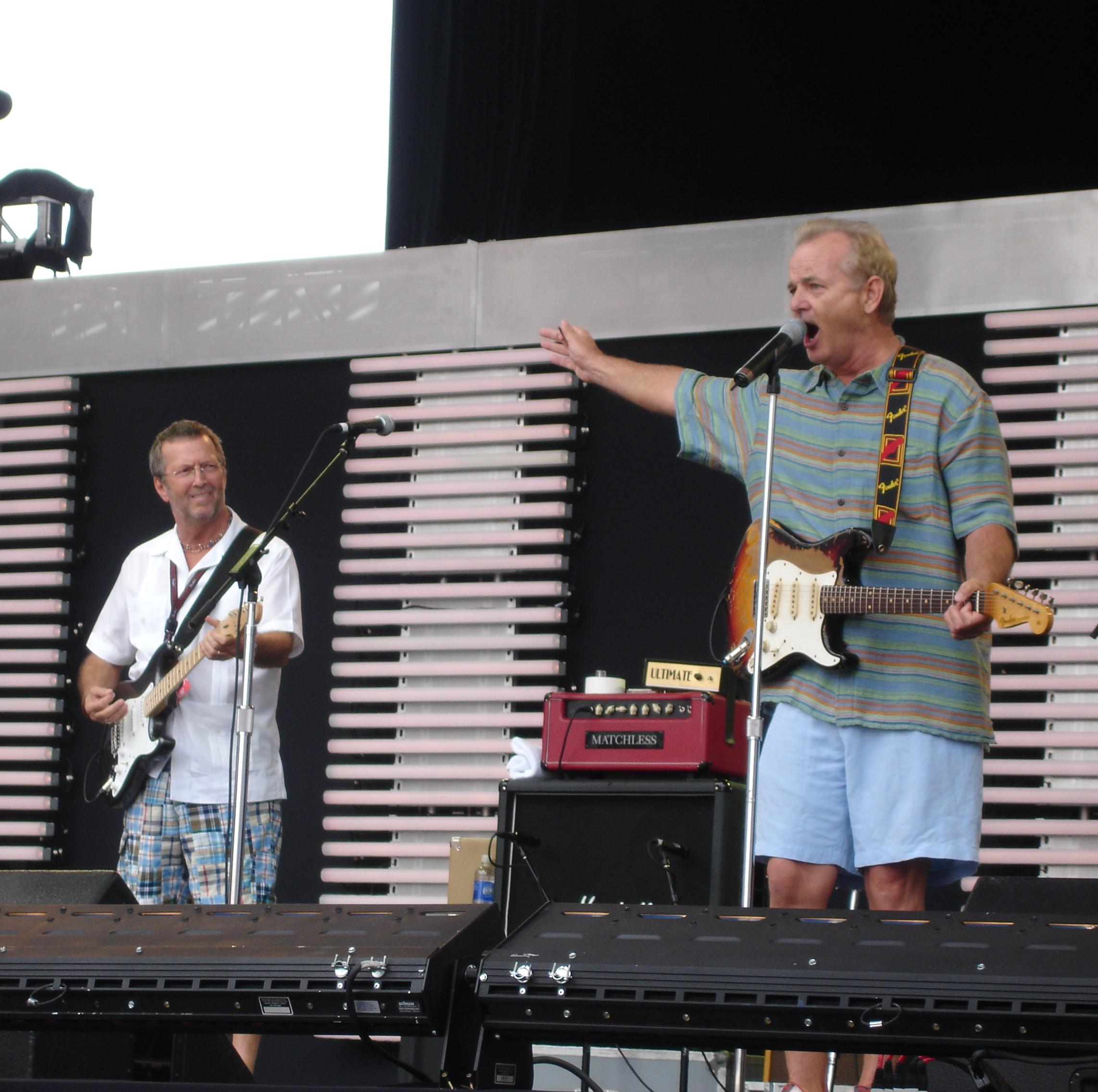
Clapton (left) and actor Bill Murray kicking off the Crossroads Guitar Festival, Illinois, on 27 July 2007

In 2007, Clapton learned more about his father, a Canadian soldier who left the UK after the war. Although Clapton's grandparents eventually told him the truth about his parentage, he only knew that his father's name was Edward Fryer. This was a source of disquiet for Clapton, as witnessed by his 1998 song "My Father's Eyes". A Montreal journalist named Michael Woloschuk researched Canadian Armed Forces service records and tracked down members of Fryer's family, and finally pieced together the story. He learned that Clapton's father was Edward Walter Fryer, born 21 March 1920, in Montreal and died 15 May 1985 in Newmarket, Ontario. Fryer was a musician (piano and saxophone) and a lifelong drifter who was married several times, had several children, and apparently never knew that he was the father of Eric Clapton. Clapton thanked Woloschuk in an encounter at Macdonald–Cartier Airport, in Ottawa, Ontario, Canada.

On 26 February 2008, it was reported that Clapton had been invited to play a concert in North Korea by government officials. Clapton agreed in principle and suggested it take place in 2009. Kristen Foster, a spokesperson for Clapton, said that he regularly received offers to play abroad and that there had been no agreement for him to play in North Korea. In February 2008, Clapton performed with his long-time friend Steve Winwood at Madison Square Garden and guested on his recorded single, "Dirty City", on Winwood's album Nine Lives. The two former Blind Faith bandmates met again for a series of 14 concerts throughout the United States in June 2009. Clapton's 2008 Summer Tour began on 3 May at the Ford Amphitheatre, Tampa, Florida, and then moved to Canada, Ireland, England, Norway, Iceland, Denmark, Poland, Germany, and Monaco. On 28 June 2008, he headlined Saturday night for Hard Rock Calling 2008 in London's Hyde Park (previously Hyde Park Calling) with support from Sheryl Crow and John Mayer.

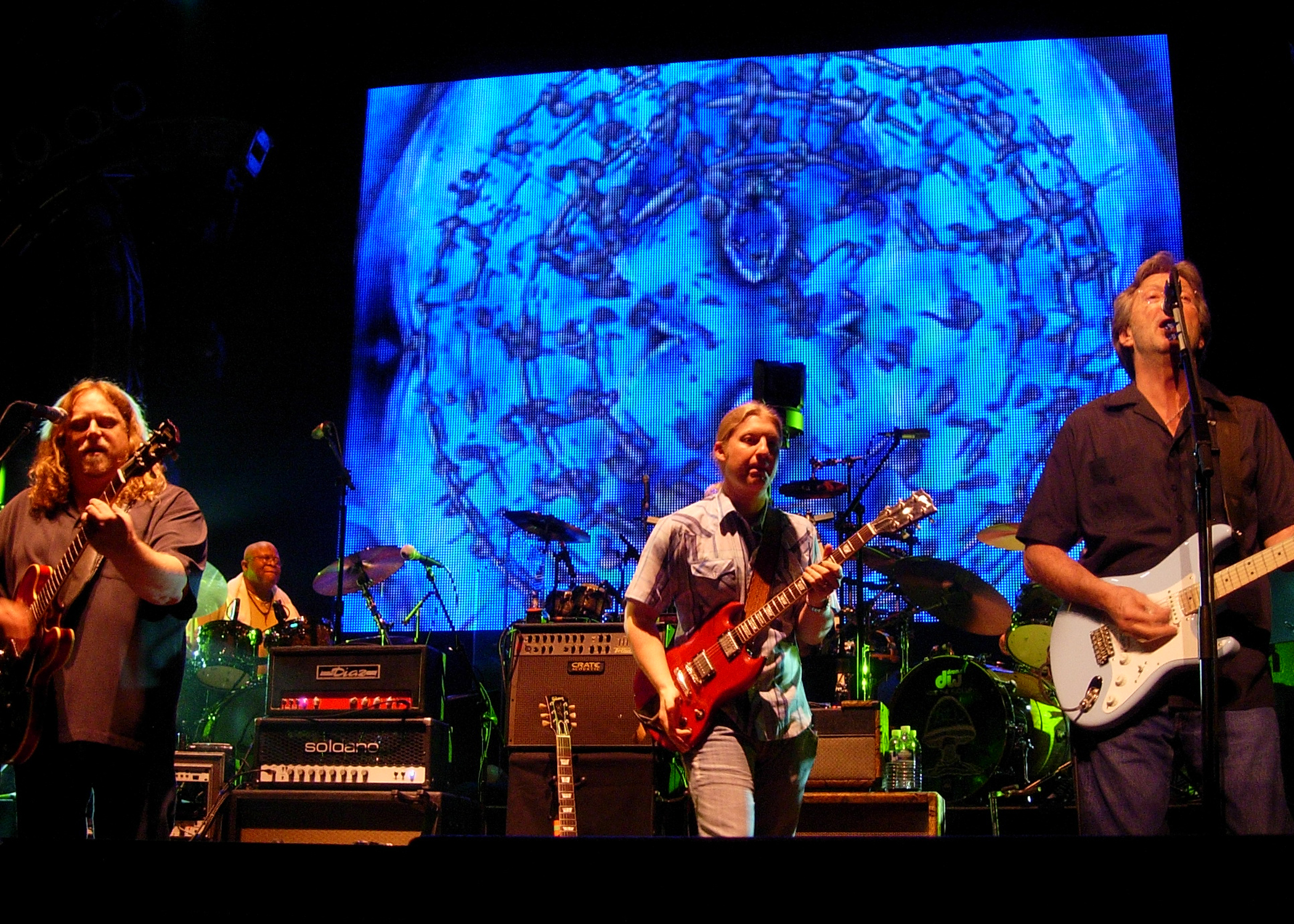
Clapton (right) performing with the Allman Brothers Band at the Beacon Theatre, New York City, in March 2009

In March 2009, the Allman Brothers Band (amongst many notable guests) celebrated their 40th year, dedicating their string of concerts to the late Duane Allman on their annual run at the Beacon Theatre. Eric Clapton was one of the performers, with drummer Butch Trucks remarking that the performance was not the typical Allman Brothers experience, given the number and musical styles of the guests who were invited to perform. Songs like "In Memory of Elizabeth Reed" were punctuated with others, including "The Weight", with Levon Helm; Johnny Winter sitting in on Hendrix's "Red House"; and "Layla". On 4 May 2009 Clapton appeared at the Royal Albert Hall, playing "Further on Up the Road" with Joe Bonamassa.

Clapton was scheduled to perform at the Rock and Roll Hall of Fame's 25th anniversary concert in Madison Square Garden on 30 October 2009, but cancelled due to gallstone surgery. Van Morrison (who also cancelled) said in an interview that he and Clapton were to do a "couple of songs", but that they would do something else together at "some other stage of the game".

=== Clapton, Old Sock, I Still Do, and Happy Xmas ===
Clapton performed a two-night show with Jeff Beck at the O_{2} Arena in London on 13–14 February 2010. The two former Yardbirds extended their 2010 tour with stops at Madison Square Garden, the Air Canada Centre in Toronto, and the Bell Centre in Montreal. Clapton performed a series of concerts in 11 cities throughout the United States from 25 February to 13 March 2010, including Roger Daltrey as opening act. His third European tour with Steve Winwood began on 18 May and ended 13 June, including Tom Norris as opening act. He then began a short North American tour lasting from 26 June to 3 July, starting with his third Crossroads Guitar Festival on 26 June at Toyota Park in Bridgeview, Illinois. Clapton released a new studio album, Clapton, on 27 September 2010 in the United Kingdom and 28 September 2010 in the United States. On 17 November 2010, Clapton performed as guest on the Prince's Trust rock gala held at the Royal Albert Hall, supported by the house band for the evening, which included Jools Holland, Midge Ure and Mark King.

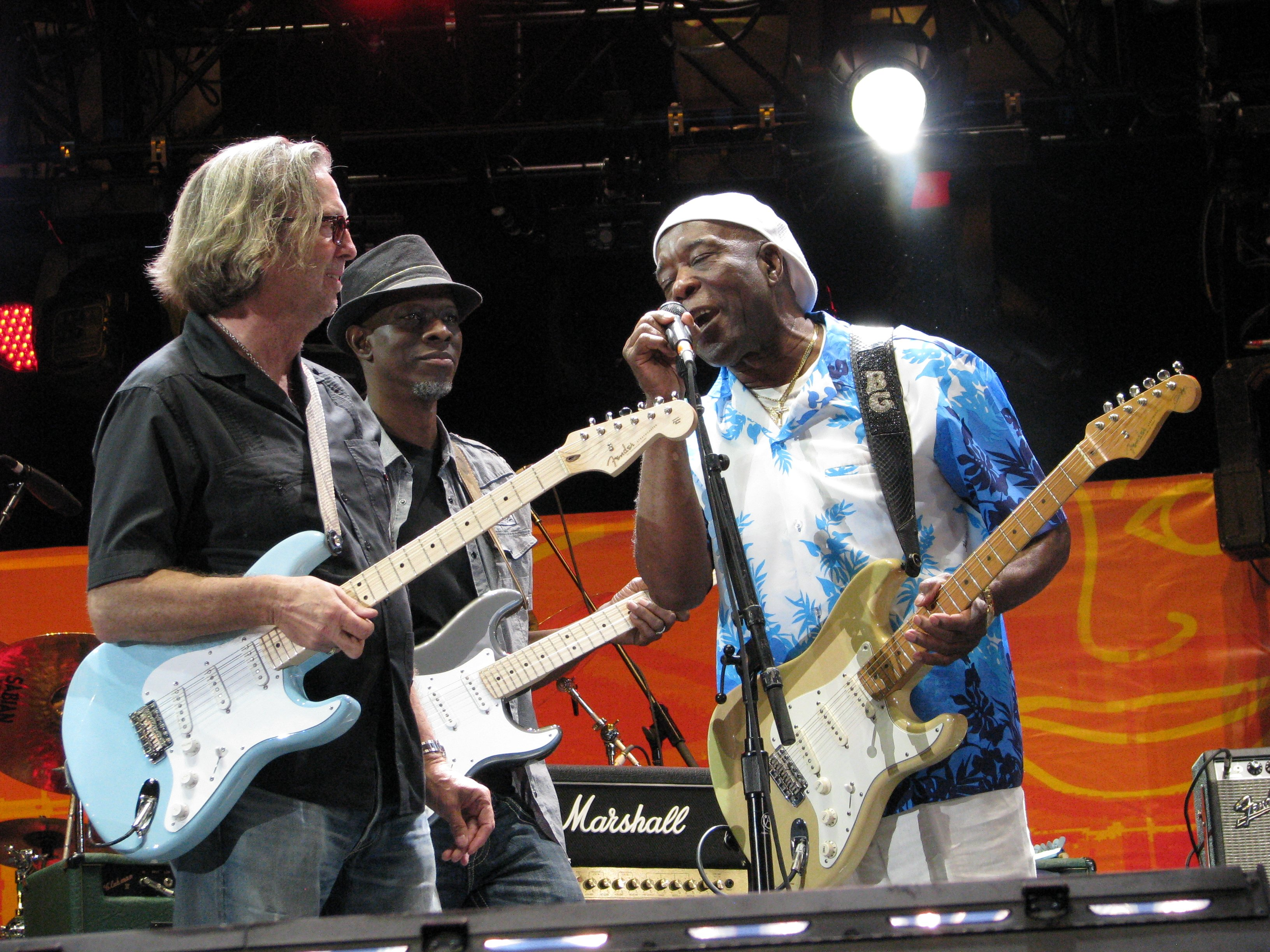
Clapton, Keb' Mo' and Buddy Guy at the Crossroads Guitar Festival on 26 June 2010

On 24 June 2011, Clapton was in concert with Pino Daniele in Cava de' Tirreni stadium before performing a series of concerts in South America from 6 to 16 October 2011. He spent November and December 2011 touring Japan with Steve Winwood, playing 13 shows in various cities throughout the country. On 24 February 2012 Clapton, Keith Richards, Gary Clark Jr., Derek Trucks, Doyle Bramhall II, Kim Wilson and other artists performed together in the Howlin' For Hubert Tribute concert held at the Apollo Theater of New York City honouring blues guitarist Hubert Sumlin who died at age 80 on 4 December 2011. On 29 November 2012, Clapton joined the Rolling Stones at London's O2 Arena during the band's second of five arena dates celebrating their 50th anniversary. On 12 December, Clapton performed The Concert for Sandy Relief at Madison Square Garden, broadcast live via television, radio, cinemas and the Internet across six continents. In January 2013, Surfdog Records announced a signed deal with Clapton for the release of his forthcoming album Old Sock on 12 March. On 8 April 2013, Eric and Hard Rock International launched the limited-edition Eric Clapton Artist Spotlight merchandise programme benefiting Crossroads Centre Antigua. Clapton toured the US and Europe from 14 March to 19 June 2013 to celebrate 50 years as a professional musician. On 28 February 2013, Clapton announced his intention to stop touring in 2015 due to hassles with travel.

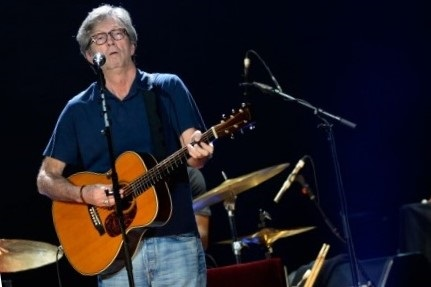
Clapton in Prague, June 2013, during his 50th Celebration World Tour

On 15 October 2013, Clapton's popular Unplugged album and concert DVD were re-released, titled Unplugged: Expanded & Remastered. The album includes the original 14 tracks, remastered, as well as 6 additional tracks, including 2 versions of "My Father's Eyes". The DVD includes a restored version of the concert, as well as over 60 minutes of unseen footage from the rehearsal. On 13 and 14 November 2013, Clapton headlined the final two evenings of the "Baloise Session", an annual indoor music festival in Basel, Switzerland. On 20 November 2013, Warner Bros released Crossroads Guitar Festival 2013 in CD/DVD/Blu-ray. On 30 April 2014, Clapton announced the release of The Breeze: An Appreciation of JJ Cale as an homage to J. J. Cale who died on 26 July 2013. This tribute album is named after the 1972 single "Call Me the Breeze" and comprises 16 Cale songs performed by Clapton, Mark Knopfler, John Mayer, Willie Nelson, Tom Petty and others.

On 21 June 2014, Clapton abruptly walked off stage during a concert at the Glasgow Hydro. Although he did return to perform one final song, thousands of fans were upset by the lack of explanation from Clapton or the venue and booed after the concert ended about 40 minutes before advertised to finish. Both Clapton and the venue apologised the next day, blaming 'technical difficulties' for making sound conditions 'unbearable' for Clapton on stage. A week later he confirmed his retirement plans, attributing his decision to the road being "unbearable" in addition to "odd ailments" that may force him to put down his guitar permanently. In a 2016 interview with Classic Rock magazine, Clapton said that he had been diagnosed with peripheral neuropathy in 2013, a condition involving damage to peripheral nerves that typically causes stabbing, burning, or tingling pain in the arms and legs.

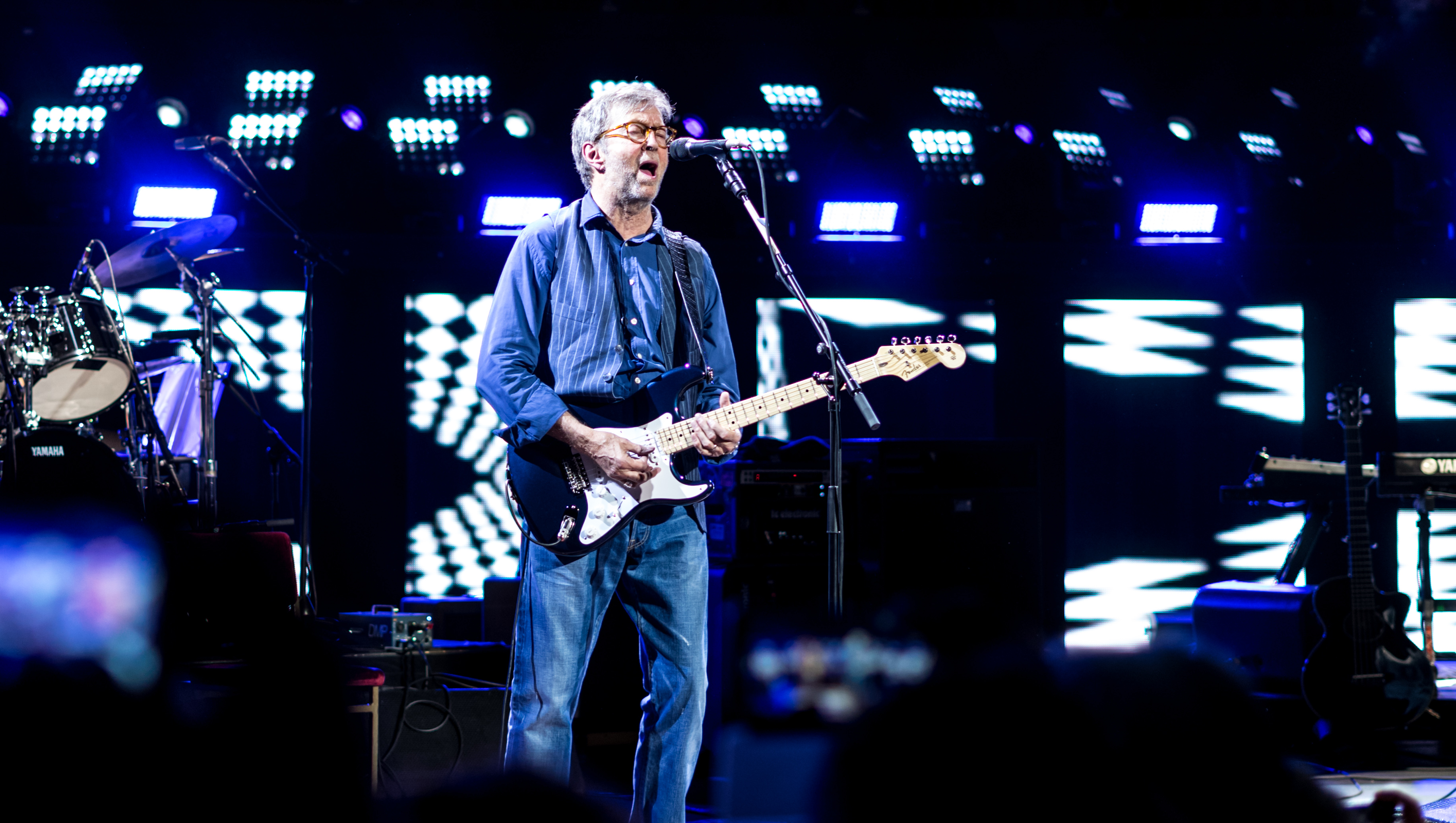
Clapton at the Royal Albert Hall in 2017 during his A Celebration of 50 Years of Music tour

Clapton performed two shows at Madison Square Garden in New York on 1 and 3 May 2015 followed by a 7-night residency at London's Royal Albert Hall from 14 to 23 May 2015 to celebrate his 70th birthday on 30 March. The shows also mark 50 years since Clapton first played at the Royal Albert Hall – his debut was on 7 December 1964 when he performed as part of the Yardbirds for the BBC's Top Beat Show. The concert film, Slowhand at 70 – Live at the Royal Albert Hall, was released by Eagle Rock Entertainment on 13 November 2015 on DVD, CD, Blu-ray and LP. The 2-night concerts in the US marked the 46th anniversary since Clapton, with Cream, opened the "new" Madison Square Garden on 2 November 1968. Clapton has performed more times at Madison Square Garden than any other US venue, a total of 45 times. On 20 May 2016, Clapton released his twenty-third studio album I Still Do. On 30 September 2016 the live-album Live in San Diego was released.

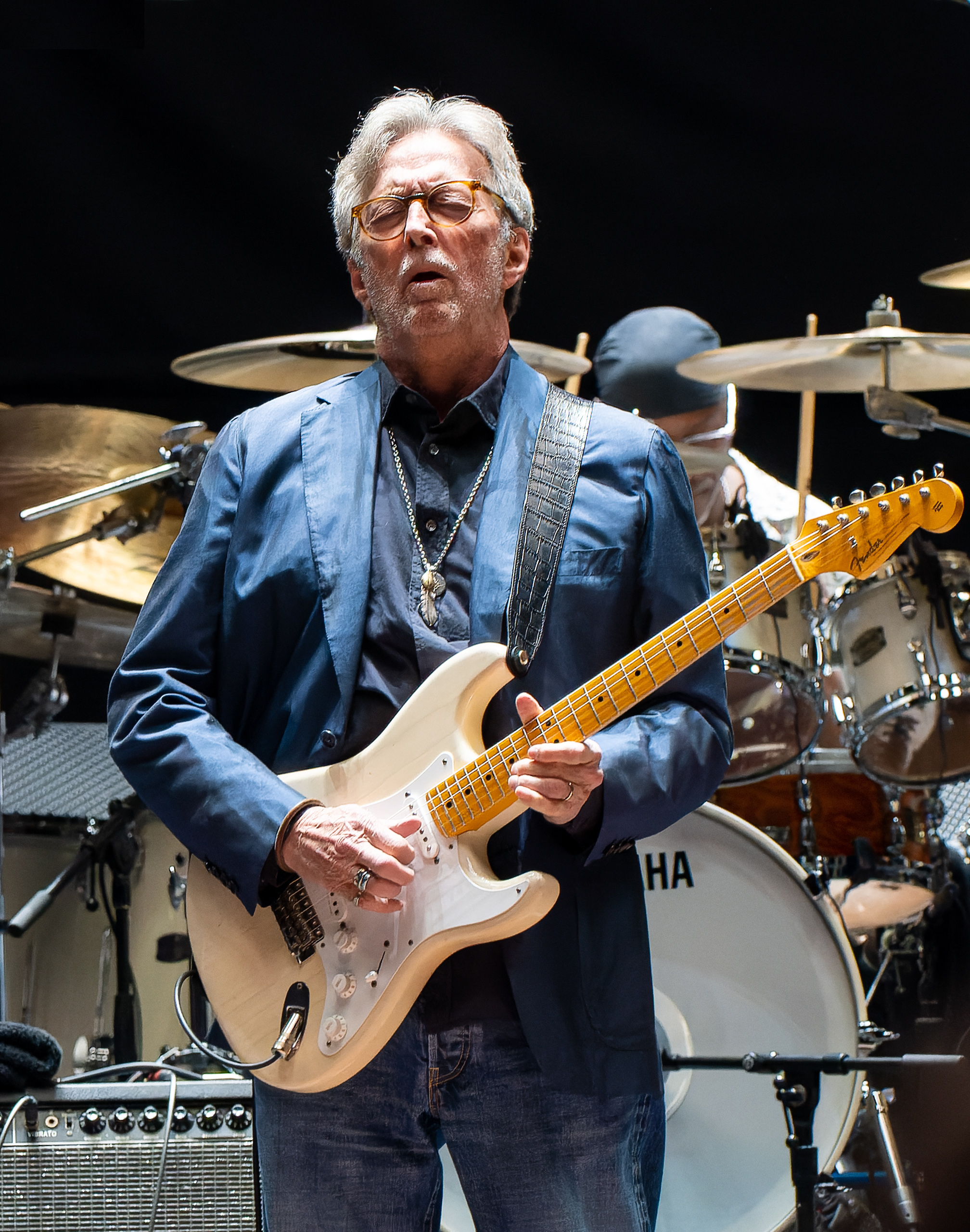
Clapton performing at the Jeff Beck tribute concert in 2023

In August 2018, Clapton announced that he had recorded his twenty-fourth studio album, Happy Xmas, which consists of blues-tinged interpretations of Christmas songs, with the album released on 12 October. Between April and September 2019, he played 17 concerts in Japan, Europe and the Southwestern United States. He returned to the road in September 2021, playing eight shows in the southern United States. In May 2022, Clapton announced a run of seven US concerts in September with Jimmie Vaughan. In May 2023, Clapton performed at the Jeff Beck tribute concerts held at the Royal Albert Hall, sharing the stage with Rod Stewart, Ronnie Wood, Kirk Hammett and Johnny Depp among others. In 2024, Clapton contributed guitar to a re-release of Mark Knopfler's "Going Home: Theme of the Local Hero" in aid of the Teenage Cancer Trust.

=== Meanwhile ===
In May 2024, Clapton revealed in an interview with The Real Music Observer that he was working on a new studio album, titled Meanwhile. The album was released digitally on 4 October, with CD and vinyl releases following on 24 January 2025.

== Influences ==
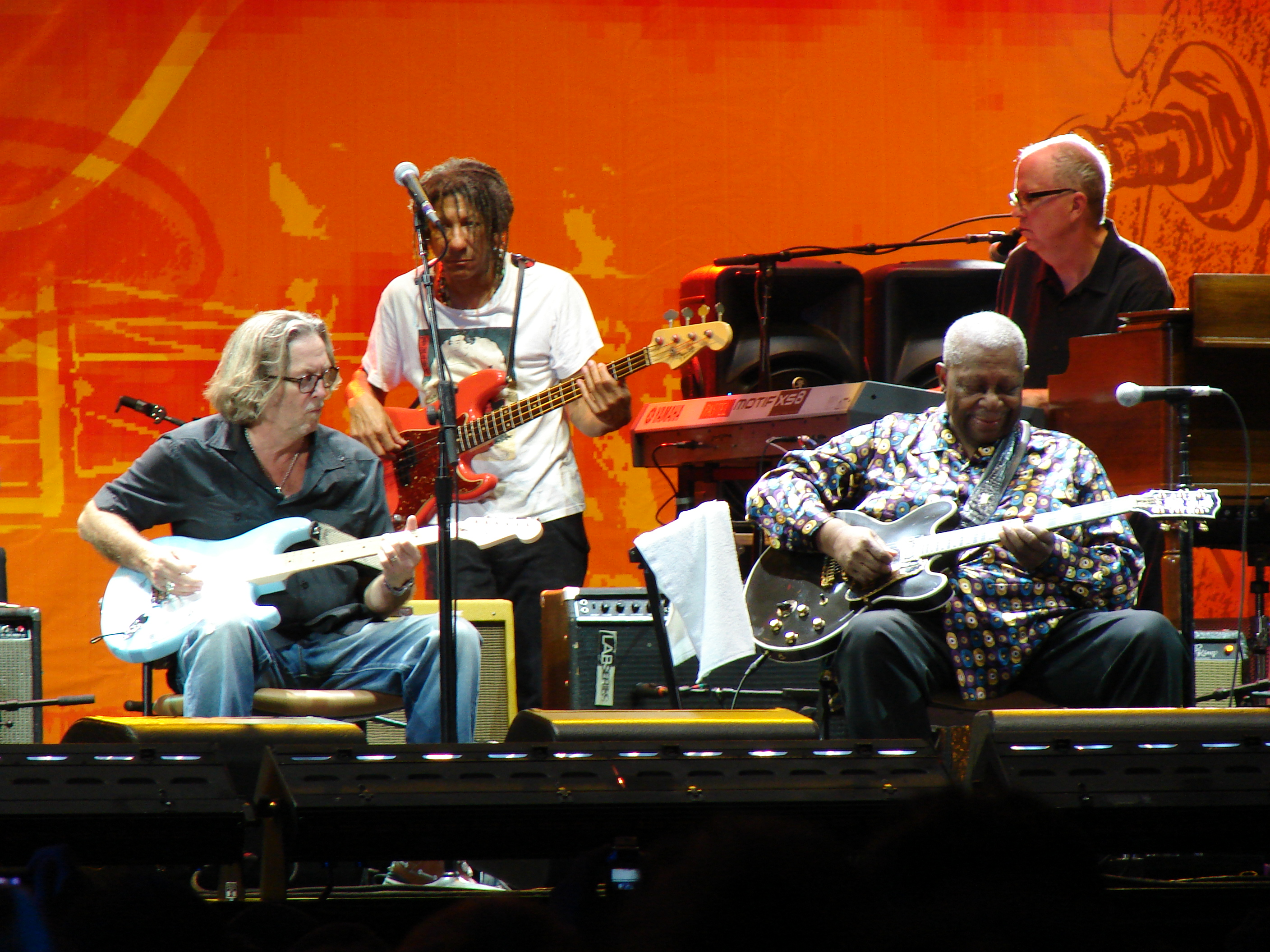
Clapton and B. B. King in 2010

Clapton cites Muddy Waters, Freddie King, B.B. King, Albert King, Buddy Guy, and Hubert Sumlin as guitar-playing influences. In his 2007 autobiography, Clapton refers to Muddy Waters as "the father figure I never really had". Until his death in 1983, Waters was a part of Clapton's life. "When I got to know Muddy, unfortunately, my drinking career was in full sway." In 2000, Clapton collaborated with B.B. King on their album Riding with the King. The music video for the title track shows Clapton as the chauffeur, with one of his idols in the back seat.

Clapton has said that blues musician Robert Johnson is his single most important influence. In 2004, Clapton released Sessions for Robert Johnson, containing covers of Johnson's songs using electric and acoustic guitars. In an essay for the 1990 boxed set of Johnson's recordings, Clapton wrote:

Robert Johnson to me is the most important blues musician who ever lived. He was true, absolutely, to his own vision, and as deep as I have gotten into the music over the last 30 years, I have never found anything more deeply soulful than Robert Johnson. His music remains the most powerful cry that I think you can find in the human voice, really ... it seemed to echo something I had always felt. [italics in original]

Clapton also singled out Buddy Holly as an influence. The "Chirping" Crickets was the first album Clapton ever bought; he later saw Holly on Sunday Night at the London Palladium. In his autobiography, Clapton recounts the first time he saw Holly and his Fender, saying, "I thought I'd died and gone to heaven ... it was like seeing an instrument from outer space and I said to myself: 'That's the future – that's what I want.'" In the 2017 documentary film, Eric Clapton: Life in 12 Bars, Clapton cites Bismillah Khan as an influence, adding that "I wanted my guitar to sound like his reed instrument." In the same documentary he also cited harmonica player Little Walter as an influence: "The sound he made with the harmonica playing through an amplifier. It was thick and fat and very melodic."

== Legacy ==
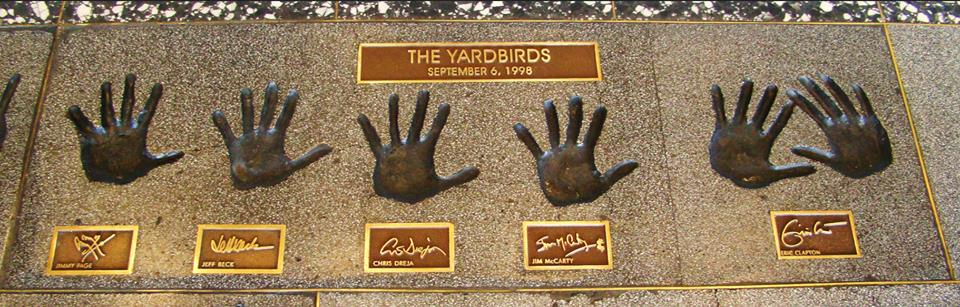
Clapton's handprints (far right) with other members of the Yardbirds at the Rock and Roll Hall of Fame

Clapton has been referred to as one of the most important and influential guitarists of all time. Clapton is the only three-time inductee to the Rock and Roll Hall of Fame: once as a solo artist, and separately as a member of the Yardbirds and Cream. He ranked second in Rolling Stone magazine's list of the "100 Greatest Guitarists of All Time" and fourth in Gibson's Top 50 Guitarists of All Time.

In 2011, The Guardian attributed the creation of the cult of the guitar hero to Clapton, ranking it number seven on their list of the 50 key events in rock music history;

Nothing is more central to rock mythology than the cult of the lead guitarist. And no one did more to create that cult than Eric Clapton. He had already been a member of the Yardbirds before joining John Mayall's Bluesbreakers, the clearing house for guitarists, in April 1965. His two stints with Mayall saw his reputation grow to the extent that a famous graffito captured the popular appraisal of him among rock fans: "Clapton is God".

Elias Leight of Rolling Stone writes that Clapton "influenced recording techniques as well as guitar-playing technique". During recording sessions with John Mayall's group, Clapton was frustrated by technicians "that just came up to your amp with the microphone and just stuck it two inches away from the front of the amplifier. It seemed to me that if you wanted to get the atmosphere we were getting in the clubs, you needed it to sound like you were in the audience 10 feet away, not three inches". Clapton then moved the microphones, with Pink Floyd's Roger Waters stating, "That changed everything. Before Eric, guitar playing in England had been Hank Marvin of the Shadows, very simple, not much technique. Suddenly we heard something completely different. The records sounded unlike anything we had heard before."

In 2012, Clapton was among the British cultural icons selected by artist Sir Peter Blake to appear in a new version of his artwork – the Beatles' Sgt. Pepper's Lonely Hearts Club Band album cover – to celebrate the British cultural figures of his life that he most admires to mark his 80th birthday. Indelibly linked to the Royal Albert Hall in London, a venue he has played at more than any other in his 50-year plus career, Clapton was inducted into the Royal Albert Hall's Walk of Fame in 2018, making him one of the first eleven recipients of a star on the walk, thus joining Muhammad Ali, Winston Churchill, the Suffragettes, and Albert Einstein, among others who were viewed as "key players" in the building's history.

Due to Clapton's impact in the music industry, he has also been mentioned in several songs. In "She's Leaving You", MJ Lenderman sings, "Believe that Clapton is the second coming", a reference to "Clapton is God". Phoebe Bridgers mentions Clapton in "Moon Song", with the lyrics "We hate 'Tears in Heaven' / But it's sad that his baby died", a reference to the death of Clapton's child, Conor. However, the original lyric, which she sometimes performs live, is "We hate Eric Clapton" instead of "We hate 'Tears in Heaven'." She has said the lyric is because he is "a famous racist" and makes "extremely mediocre music".

== Guitars ==
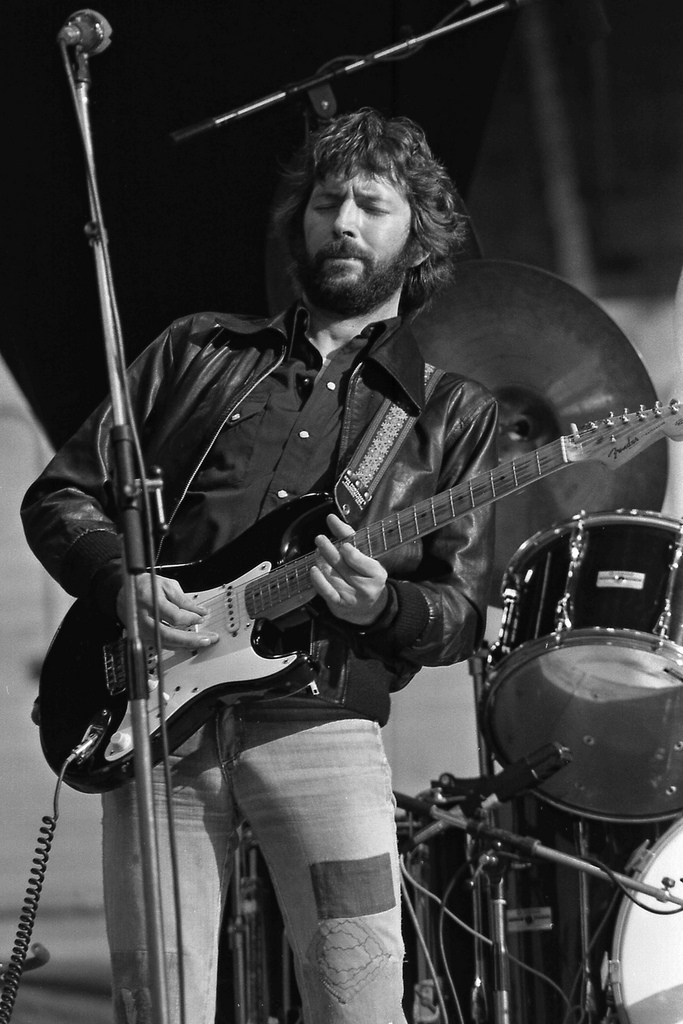
Clapton with "Blackie" in 1978. He recorded hits such as "Cocaine", "I Shot the Sheriff", "Wonderful Tonight", "Further On Up the Road" and "Lay Down Sally" on Blackie.

Like Hank Marvin, the Beatles and Jimi Hendrix, Clapton exerted a crucial and widespread influence in popularising particular models of electric guitar. With the Yardbirds, Clapton played a Fender Telecaster, a Fender Jazzmaster, a double-cutaway Gretsch 6120, and a 1964 Cherry-Red Gibson ES-335. He became exclusively a Gibson player for a period beginning in mid-1965, when he purchased a used sunburst Gibson Les Paul guitar from a guitar store in London. Clapton commented on the slim profile of the neck, which would indicate it was a 1960 model.

Early during his stint in Cream, Clapton's first Les Paul Standard was stolen. He continued to play Les Pauls exclusively with Cream (one bought from Andy Summers was almost identical to the stolen guitar) until 1967, when he acquired his most famous guitar in this period, a 1964 Gibson SG, dubbed "the Fool". Clapton used both the Les Paul and the SG to create his self-described "woman tone". He explained in a 1967 interview, "I am playing more smoothly now. I'm developing what I call my 'woman tone.' It's a sweet sound, something like the solo on 'I Feel Free'." Writer Michael Dregni describes it as "thick yet piercing, overdriven yet smooth, distorted yet creamy". The tone is achieved by a combination of tone control settings on the guitars and Clapton's Marshall JTM45 amplifier. Vintage Guitar magazine identifies "the opening riff and solo of 'Sunshine of Your Love' are arguably the best illustrations of full-blown woman tone". Clapton's "Fool" acquired its name from its distinctive psychedelic paint job, created by the visual art collective also known as the Fool (just before Cream's first US appearance in 1967, Clapton's SG, Bruce's Fender VI, and Baker's drum head were all repainted in psychedelic designs).

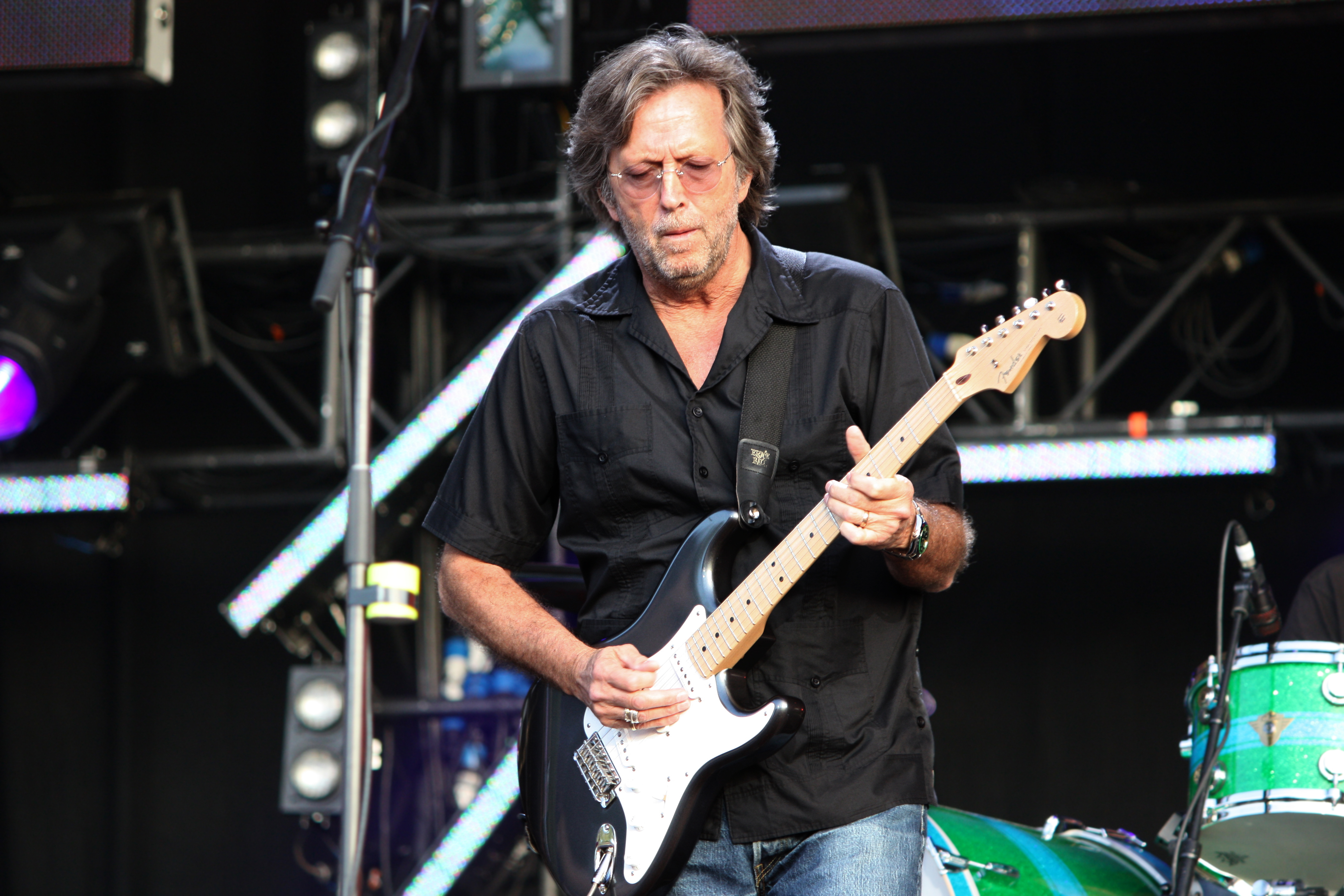
Clapton playing an Eric Clapton Stratocaster at the Hard Rock Calling concert in Hyde Park, London, in 2008

In 1968, Clapton bought a Gibson Firebird and started using the 1964 Cherry-Red Gibson ES-335 again. The aforementioned 1964 ES-335 had a storied career. Clapton used it at the last Cream show in November 1968 as well as with Blind Faith, played it sparingly for slide pieces in the 1970s, used it on "Hard Times" from Journeyman, the Hyde Park live concert of 1996, and the From the Cradle sessions and tour of 1994–95. It was sold for US$847,500 at a 2004 auction. Gibson produced a limited run of 250 "Crossroads 335" replicas. The 335 was only the second electric guitar Clapton bought.

In July 1968 Clapton gave George Harrison a 1957 'goldtop' Gibson Les Paul that been refinished with a red colour, nicknamed Lucy. The following September, Clapton played the guitar on the Beatles' recording of "While My Guitar Gently Weeps". Lucy was stolen from Harrison, though later tracked down and returned to him – he lent it to Clapton for his 1973 comeback concert at the Rainbow. His SG "The Fool" found its way into the hands of George Harrison's friend Jackie Lomax, who subsequently sold it to musician Todd Rundgren for US$500 in 1972. Rundgren restored the guitar and nicknamed it "Sunny", after "Sunshine of Your Love". He retained it until 2000, when he sold it at an auction for US$150,000. At the 1969 Blind Faith concert in Hyde Park, London Clapton played a Fender Custom Telecaster, which was fitted with "Brownie"'s neck.

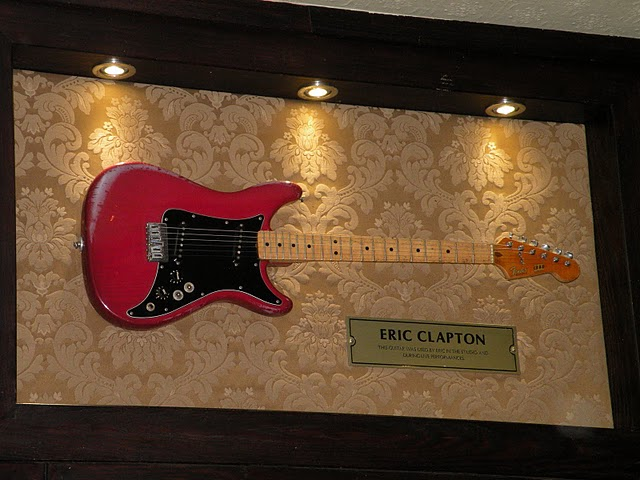
Clapton's Lead II Fender, the first ever piece of memorabilia donated to the Hard Rock Cafe, London, in 1979

In late 1969 Clapton made the switch to the Fender Stratocaster. "I had a lot of influences when I took up the Strat. First there was Buddy Holly, and Buddy Guy. Hank Marvin was the first well known person over here in England who was using one, but that wasn't really my kind of music. Steve Winwood had so much credibility, and when he started playing one, I thought, oh, if he can do it, I can do it". The first—used during the recording of Eric Clapton—was "Brownie", which in 1973 became the backup to the most famous of all Clapton's guitars, "Blackie". In November 1970 Eric bought six Fender Stratocasters from the Sho-bud guitar shop in Nashville, Tennessee while on tour with the Dominos. He gave one each to George Harrison, Steve Winwood, and Pete Townshend. His first Stratocaster, Brownie, was purchased on 7 May 1967 and made its debut in 1970 on his first solo album, in concert with Derek and the Dominos as well on the album Layla and Other Assorted Love Songs.

Clapton assembled the best components of the remaining three to create "Blackie", which was his favourite stage guitar until its retirement in 1985. It was first played live 13 January 1973 at the Rainbow Concert. Clapton called the 1956/57 Strat a "mongrel". On 24 June 2004, Clapton sold "Blackie" at Christie's Auction House, New York, for US$959,500 to raise funds for his Crossroads Centre for drug and alcohol addictions. "Brownie" is now on display at the Experience Music Project. The Fender Custom Shop has since produced a limited run of 275 'Blackie' replicas, correct in every detail right down to the 'Duck Brothers' flight case, and artificially aged using Fender's "Relic" process to simulate years of hard wear. One was presented to Clapton upon the model's release and was used for three numbers during a concert at the Royal Albert Hall on 17 May 2006. In 1979, Clapton gave his signed Fender Lead II guitar to the Hard Rock Cafe in London to designate his favourite bar stool. Pete Townshend also donated his own Gibson Les Paul guitar, with a note attached: "Mine's as good as his! Love, Pete".

Signature guitars in Clapton's honour are made by Fender and C.F. Martin & Company. In 1988, Fender introduced his signature Eric Clapton Stratocaster. Several signature-model 000-sized acoustic guitars made by Martin. The first, of these, introduced in 1995, was a limited edition 000-42EC Eric Clapton signature model with a production run of 461. For the single "Change the World" (1996) and the album Pilgrim (1998) he used a Martin 000-28 EC Eric Clapton signature model, which he subsequently gave to guitarist Paul Wassif. His 1939 000-42 Martin that he played on the Unplugged album sold for US$791,500 at auction. Clapton uses Ernie Ball Slinky and Super Slinky strings, gauge .10 to.46. His guitar technician for over thirty years was Lee Dickson.

== Other media appearances ==
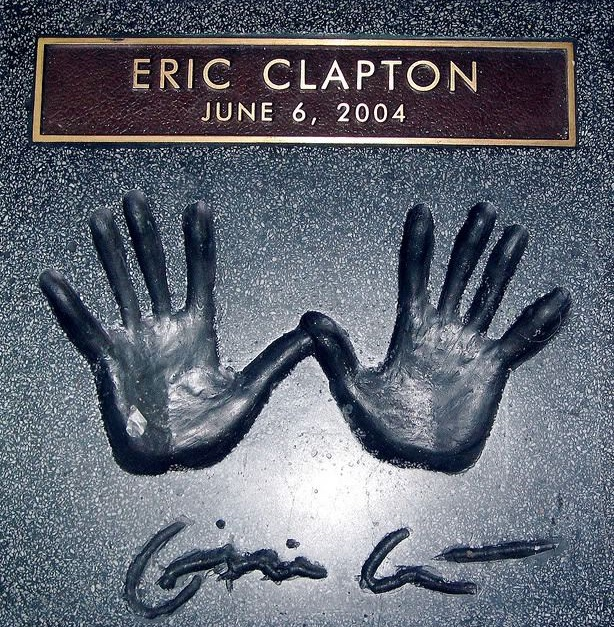
Clapton's handprints in Hollywood, California

Clapton appeared in the movie version of Tommy, the first full-length rock opera, written by the Who. In the movie version, Clapton appeared as the Preacher, performing Sonny Boy Williamson's song, "Eyesight to the Blind". He appeared in Blues Brothers 2000 as one of the Louisiana Gator Boys. In addition to being in the band, he had a small speaking role. Clapton has appeared in an advertisement for the Mercedes-Benz G-Wagen. In March 2007 Clapton appeared in an advertisement for RealNetwork's Rhapsody online music service. In 2010, Clapton started appearing as a spokesman for T-Mobile, advertising their MyTouch Fender cell phone. Clapton also appeared in the 2011 BBC documentary Reggae Got Soul: The Story of Toots and the Maytals, which was described as "The untold story of one of the most influential artists ever to come out of Jamaica."

When asked to describe God by their minister, the characters Eric Forman and Steven Hyde both drew an image of Clapton in the episode "Holy Crap!" of season two of That '70s Show.

Clapton appeared on the BBC's Top Gear in 2013, during Series 19 Episode 4 and was involved in testing the new Kia Ceed. He was called upon to test the Ceed's auxiliary input, which he tested by plugging in one of his guitars and playing several bars of his most famous hits. He was introduced by Top Gear host Jeremy Clarkson as a "local guitarist".

In 2017, a documentary film titled Eric Clapton: Life in 12 Bars was directed by Lili Fini Zanuck. Clapton wrote the film score for Zanuck's 1991 film Rush and the two remained friends. In an interview for BBC News, Zanuck said that Clapton only agreed to participate if she directed it:

I think this got made because Eric was in the right mood. He's an incredibly private man and despite his immense success, he's never cared if he got any publicity at all, he just loves his music ... I think it might be something to do with his age, as he turned 70 a couple of years ago. He said to me, "I didn't want it to be done after I was dead and for it to be wrong." Maybe he thought his time had come to lay it all out on the table.

Nothing but the Blues is a 1995 documentary film about Clapton's musical journey and his love for the blues. Martin Scorsese was one of the executive producers.

== Personal life ==
=== Relationships ===
Clapton's partner from the late 1960s to 1974 was Alice Ormsby-Gore, a British aristocrat. They were together for three years and were both addicted to heroin. He briefly dated funk singer Betty Davis.

Clapton became friends with George Harrison in the late 1960s and they began writing and recording music together. Clapton fell in love with Pattie Boyd, who was married to Harrison at this time. Harrison and Boyd divorced in 1977 and she married Clapton on 27 March 1979, in Tucson, Arizona. Their marriage was marred by his infidelities and domestic violence. During a 1999 interview with The Sunday Times, Clapton admitted to raping and abusing her when they were married and he was a "full-blown" alcoholic who felt entitled to sex. In 1984, while recording Behind the Sun, Clapton began a relationship with Yvonne Kelly, the manager of AIR Studios Montserrat. Although both were married to other partners at the time, they had a daughter named Ruth Kelly Clapton in January 1985. Ruth's existence was kept from the public until the media realised she was his child in 1991.

Clapton and Boyd tried unsuccessfully to have children, even trying in vitro fertilisation in 1984, but were faced instead with miscarriages. He had an affair with Italian model Lory Del Santo, who gave birth to their son, Conor, on 21 August 1986. Clapton and Boyd later divorced in 1989 after she was "utterly devastated" by his confession to impregnating Del Santo during this affair. Conor died on 20 March 1991 at the age of four after falling out of an open bedroom window on the 53rd floor of the Galleria apartment building in Manhattan.

In 1998, Clapton, then 53, met 22-year-old administrative assistant Melia McEnery in Columbus, Ohio, at a party given for him after a performance. He quietly dated her for a year, and went public with the relationship in 1999. They married on 1 January 2002 at St Mary Magdalene Church in Clapton's birthplace, Ripley. They have three daughters.

=== Health ===
Clapton struggled with substance abuse in his younger years, drinking two bottles of vodka a day by the late 1960s and becoming addicted to heroin a few years later. Clapton eventually gave up alcohol and other recreational drugs in 1982. A former heavy cigarette smoker, Clapton quit smoking in 1994.

== Political opinions ==
=== "Keep Britain White" ===
On 5 August 1976, Clapton spoke out against increasing immigration during a concert in Birmingham. Visibly intoxicated on stage, Clapton voiced his support for the right-wing British politician Enoch Powell. He addressed the audience as follows:

Do we have any foreigners in the audience tonight? If so, please put up your hands. So where are you? Well wherever you all are, I think you should all just leave. Not just leave the hall, leave our country. I don't want you here, in the room or in my country. Listen to me, man! I think we should vote for Enoch Powell. Enoch's our man. I think Enoch's right, I think we should send them all back. Stop Britain from becoming a black colony. Get the foreigners out. Get the wogs out. Get the coons out. Keep Britain white. I used to be into dope, now I'm into racism. It's much heavier, man. Fucking wogs, man. Fucking Saudis taking over London. Bastard wogs. Britain is becoming overcrowded and Enoch will stop it and send them all back. The black wogs and coons and Arabs and fucking Jamaicans don't belong here, we don't want them here. This is England, this is a white country, we don't want any black wogs and coons living here. We need to make clear to them they are not welcome. England is for white people, man. This is Great Britain, a white country, what is happening to us, for fuck's sake? Throw the wogs out! Keep Britain white!

"Keep Britain White" was, at the time, a slogan of the far-right National Front (NF). This incident, along with some controversial remarks made around the same time by David Bowie, were the main catalysts for the creation of Rock Against Racism, with a concert on 30 April 1978.

In an interview from October 1976 with Sounds magazine, Clapton said that he did not "know much about politics" and said of his immigration speech that "I just don't know what came over me that night. It must have been something that happened in the day but it came out in this garbled thing." In a 2004 interview with Uncut, Clapton referred to Enoch Powell as "outrageously brave." He said that the UK was "inviting people in as cheap labour and then putting them in ghettos." In 2004, Clapton told an interviewer for Scotland on Sunday, "There's no way I could be a racist. It would make no sense." In his 2007 autobiography, Clapton said he was "deliberately oblivious" to racial conflict. In a December 2007 interview with Melvyn Bragg on The South Bank Show, Clapton said he was not a racist but still believed Powell's comments were relevant.

In 2018 Clapton stated he was "disgusted" with himself for his "chauvinistic" and "fascistic" comments on stage. He added: "I sabotaged everything I got involved with. I was so ashamed of who I was, a kind of semi-racist, which didn't make sense. Half of my friends were black, I dated a black woman, and I championed black music."

=== Opposition to fox-hunting ban ===
Clapton supports the Countryside Alliance, which promotes field sports and issues relating to the British countryside. He has played in concerts to raise funds for the organisation and publicly opposed the Labour Party's ban on fox hunting with the Hunting Act 2004. A spokesperson for Clapton said, "Eric supports the Countryside Alliance. He does not hunt himself, but does enjoy rural pursuits such as fishing and shooting. He supports the Alliance's pursuit to scrap the ban on the basis that he disagrees with the state's interference with people's private pursuits."

=== COVID-19 ===
In November 2020, during the COVID-19 pandemic, Clapton and Van Morrison collaborated on an anti-mask, anti-lockdown single entitled "Stand and Deliver", the profits from which were donated to Morrison's Lockdown Financial Hardship Fund. In July 2021, Clapton wrote that he would "not perform on any stage where there is a discriminated audience present", in response to Boris Johnson mandating that concert attendees be vaccinated. Clapton had by then taken both doses of the AstraZeneca vaccine and said he had had severe reactions to both injections. Whether the symptoms he reported were actually vaccine-related was called into question by an NBC News editorial, given that Clapton previously reported suffering the same symptoms as early as 2013 due to nerve damage.

In August 2021, Clapton released the single "This Has Gotta Stop" and an accompanying music video. It was described as a protest song against COVID-19 lockdowns, vaccinations, and contains lyrical and visual statements against what Clapton sees as the erosion of civil liberties as the result of lockdown policies. Clapton tested positive for COVID-19 in May 2022, causing him to cancel some concerts in his tour schedule.

=== Gaza war ===
In November 2023, during the Gaza war, Clapton released a song titled "Voice of a Child", along with a video featuring images of destruction in the Gaza Strip. In December 2023, Clapton organized a charity concert to raise funds for children in the Gaza Strip. During the event, he played a guitar painted with the colours of the Palestinian flag.

At the 2024 United Kingdom general election, Clapton endorsed Andrew Feinstein, an independent pro-Palestine candidate who stood against Labour Party leader Keir Starmer in the constituency of Holborn and St Pancras.

== Assets and philanthropy ==
=== Wealth and assets ===
In 2009, Surrey Life Magazine ranked Clapton as number 17 in their list of richest Surrey residents, estimating his fortune at £120 million in assets. This was a combination of income, property, a £9 million yacht, Va Bene (previously owned by Bernie Ecclestone), his back music catalogue, his touring income, and his holding company Marshbrook Ltd, which had earned him £110 million since 1989. In 2003, he purchased a 50% share of gentleman's outfitters Cordings Piccadilly. At the time, owner Noll Uloth was trying to save the shop from closure and contacted Clapton, his "best client"; within five minutes, Clapton replied with "I can't let this happen".

=== Car collection ===
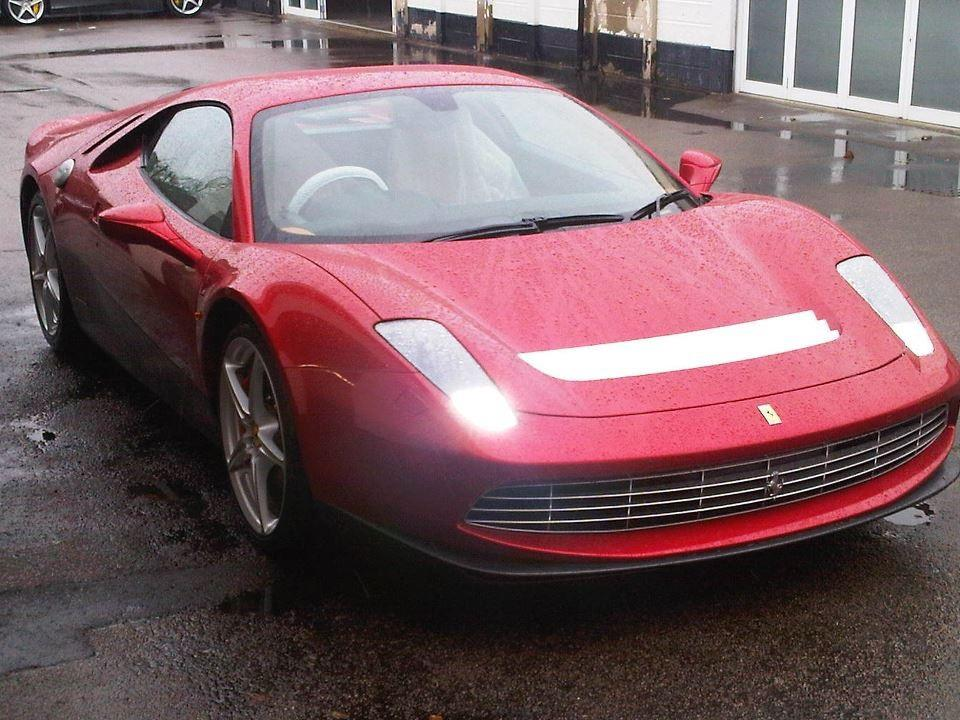
Ferrari SP12 EC built for Clapton under Ferrari's Special Projects programme

Since the 1970s, Clapton has considered himself a "car enthusiast" and has often stated his passion for the Ferrari brand. Clapton owns or has owned a range of Ferraris, and when asked about his Ferrari collection in 1989, he said he liked the touring cars the company produces for road use and commented "if I had more space and if I had been wise I would have a huge collection by now and I would be a multi-multi-millionaire". In 2010, he explained that for him "Ferrari has always been the number one car" to own and drive, and that he always supported Ferrari on the road and in Formula One motor racing.

In 2012, Ferrari honoured Clapton with the one-off special project car, the Ferrari SP12 EC. In July 2013 Clapton displayed it at the Goodwood Festival of Speed in England in the Michelin Supercar Run. In 2014, Clapton explained that Ferrari is still his favourite car marque. Among the other vehicles Clapton owns or has owned are a vintage Mini Cooper Radford that was a gift from George Harrison.

=== Charitable work ===
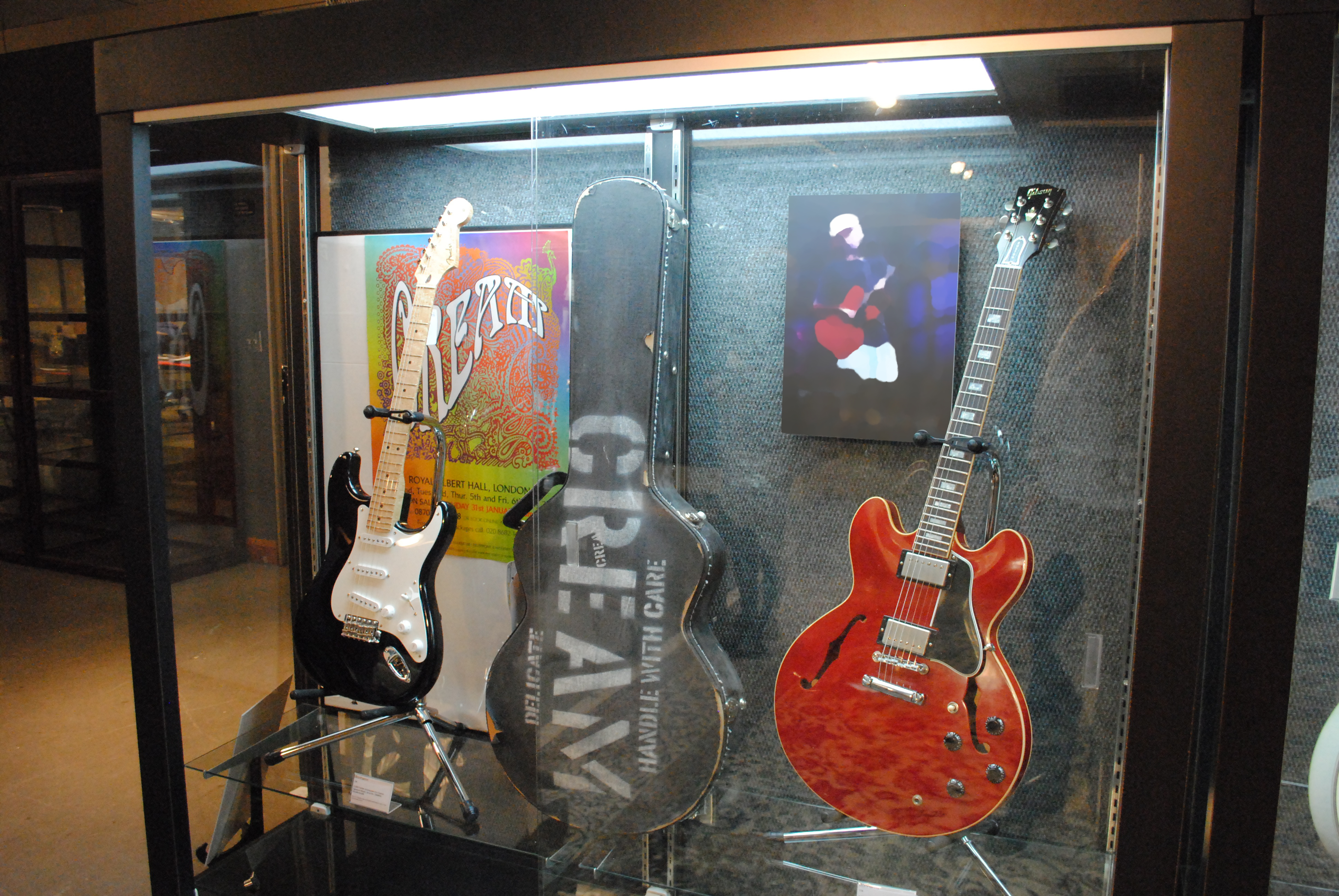
Auction of Clapton's guitars and amps in aid of the Crossroads Centre, a substance abuse rehabilitation facility

In 1993, Clapton was appointed a director of Clouds House, a UK treatment centre for drug and alcohol dependence, and was a member of the board until 1997. He also served on the board of directors for The Chemical Dependency Centre from 1994 until 1999. The two charities subsequently merged to become Action on Addiction in 2007.

In 1998, Clapton established the Crossroads Centre in Antigua to help others to overcome addiction to drugs and alcohol. He has remained active in its management oversight and fundraising to the present day. He organised the Crossroads Guitar Festival in 1999, 2004, 2007, 2010, 2013, 2019 and 2023 to raise funds for the centre. In 1999, Clapton auctioned off some of his guitar collection and raised more than US$5 million for continued support of the Crossroads Centre. A second guitar auction, which included the "Cream" of Clapton's collection, as well as guitars donated by famous friends, was held on 24 June 2004 at Christie's and raised US$7,438,624. His Lowden acoustic guitar sold for US$41,825.

In 2011, Clapton sold over 150 items at a New York auction, with the proceeds going to the Crossroads Centre. Items sold included his guitar from the Cream reunion tour in 2005, speaker cabinets used in the early 1970s from his days with Derek and the Dominos, and guitars from Jeff Beck, J. J. Cale, and Joe Bonamassa. In March 2011, Clapton raised more than £1.3 million when he auctioned off 138 lots, consisting of 75 guitars and 55 amps from his personal collection, including a 1948 Gibson hollow body guitar; a Gianni Versace suit from his 1990 concert at the Royal Albert Hall; and a replica of his famous Fender Stratocaster known as "Blackie", which fetched more than $30,000. All proceeds went to Crossroads.

Clapton has performed at The Secret Policeman's Ball, a benefit show co-founded by Monty Python member John Cleese on behalf of Amnesty International. He made his first appearance at the show, held in London's Theatre Royal, Drury Lane, in 1981, and subsequently became an activist. Clapton has collaborated with The Prince's Trust, the leading UK youth charity, which provides training, personal development, business start up support, mentoring, and advice. He has performed at the charity's rock concert numerous times since the 1980s, most recently in 2010. In 2008, he donated a song to Aid Still Required's CD to assist with the restoration of Southeast Asia after the devastation inflicted by the 2004 tsunami.

=== Football ===
Clapton is a fan of English football club West Bromwich Albion. In 1982, he performed a concert before West Brom player John Wile's testimonial game at The Hawthorns. It has been reported that the club rejected his offer to invest cash in the club around this time. In the late 1970s Clapton positioned a West Brom scarf on the back cover of his album, Backless. In the 1978–79 season Clapton sponsored West Brom's UEFA Cup home game against Turkish club Galatasaray.

== Awards and honours ==
Year	Award / Recognition
1983	Presented the Silver Clef Award from Princess Michael of Kent for outstanding contribution to British music.
1985	Presented the BAFTA for Best Original Television Music for Score of Edge of Darkness with Michael Kamen.
1992	Presented the Ivor Novello Award for Lifetime Achievement from the British Academy of Songwriters, Composers and Authors.
1993	"Tears in Heaven" won three Grammy Awards for Song of the Year, Record of the Year, and Male Pop Vocal Performance. Clapton also won Album of the Year and Best Rock Vocal Performance for Unplugged and Best Rock Song for "Layla".
1995	Made an Officer of the Order of the British Empire (OBE) for services to music, as part of the 1995 New Year Honours list.
2000	Inducted into the Rock and Roll Hall of Fame for the third time, this time as a solo artist. He was earlier inducted as a member of the bands Cream and the Yardbirds.
2004	Promoted to Commander of the Order of the British Empire (CBE), receiving the award from the Princess Royal at Buckingham Palace as part of the 2004 New Year Honours list.
2006	Awarded the Grammy Lifetime Achievement Award as a member of Cream.
2015	An asteroid, 4305 Clapton, is named after him.
2017	Made a Commandeur of the Ordre des Arts et des Lettres of France

== Discography ==
=== Solo studio albums ===
- Eric Clapton (1970)
- 461 Ocean Boulevard (1974)
- There's One in Every Crowd (1975)
- No Reason to Cry (1976)
- Slowhand (1977)
- Backless (1978)
- Another Ticket (1981)
- Money and Cigarettes (1983)
- Behind the Sun (1985)
- August (1986)
- Journeyman (1989)
- From the Cradle (1994)
- Pilgrim (1998)
- Reptile (2001)
- Me and Mr. Johnson (2004)
- Sessions for Robert J (2004)
- Back Home (2005)
- Clapton (2010)
- Old Sock (2013)
- I Still Do (2016)
- Happy Xmas (2018)
- Meanwhile (2024)

=== Collaborative studio albums ===
- Riding with the King (with B. B. King) (2000)
- The Road to Escondido (with JJ Cale) (2006)
- The Breeze: An Appreciation of JJ Cale (by Eric Clapton & Friends) (2014)

== See also ==
- Cordings, a clothing company he has owned
- List of British Grammy Award winners and nominees
