= Clapton is God =

1960s meme

- The original photograph of the Islington graffiti. It received worldwide recognition and helped create a myth around Eric Clapton.
- Original form: Graffiti
- Coined by: Hamish Grimes
- Meaning: Eric Clapton fan meme

"Clapton is God" is a 1960s meme referencing the English guitarist Eric Clapton. The line was popularised after being spray-painted on a wall in London during the mid-1960s, when Clapton was a member of the Yardbirds and John Mayall & the Bluesbreakers, creating the cult of the guitar hero.

== Overview ==
The earliest known use of the phrase appeared in the form of graffiti spray-painted by an unknown admirer on a wall in Islington, London. Commentators traced the year of origin variously to 1965, early 1966, and 1967. Soon after, the proclamation could be seen scrawled at numerous spots around London, such as on club bathroom walls and construction sites. It also appeared around New York. In 2016, Clapton speculated that the original graffiti was painted by Hamish Grimes, a promoter who worked for the Yardbirds' manager.

Clapton was initially humbled by the slogan. Later, he said he had become embarrassed by it, saying in his The South Bank Show profile in 1987, "I never accepted that I was the greatest guitar player in the world. I always wanted to be the greatest guitar player in the world, but that's an ideal, and I accept it as an ideal."

== In popular culture ==
- Peter Green of Fleetwood Mac was nicknamed the "Green God" as a reference to the "Clapton is God" graffiti.
- In 1990, the political cartoon strip Doonesbury ran a controversial story arc involving the character Andy Lippincott and his terminal battle with AIDS, which concludes with Lippincott expressing his admiration for the Beach Boys' Pet Sounds. One of the last panels depicts the character's last written words scrawled on a notebook: "Brian Wilson is God", a wry reference to "Clapton is God".
- In the second season episode of That '70s Show "Holy Crap!", youth pastor Dave has Eric (Topher Grace) and Hyde (Danny Masterson) drawing what they see in their minds when they think of God. Both boys draw pictures of Eric Clapton.
- In the early-2000's, Foley is God became a popular slogan for professional wrestler Mick Foley, following his famous Hell in a Cell bout at King of the Ring in 1998, appearing on fan-illustrated signs, merchandise, and even alluded to in the title of Foley's second autobiography Foley is Good.
