= Va Bene (yacht) =

Yacht formerly owned by Bernie Ecclestone

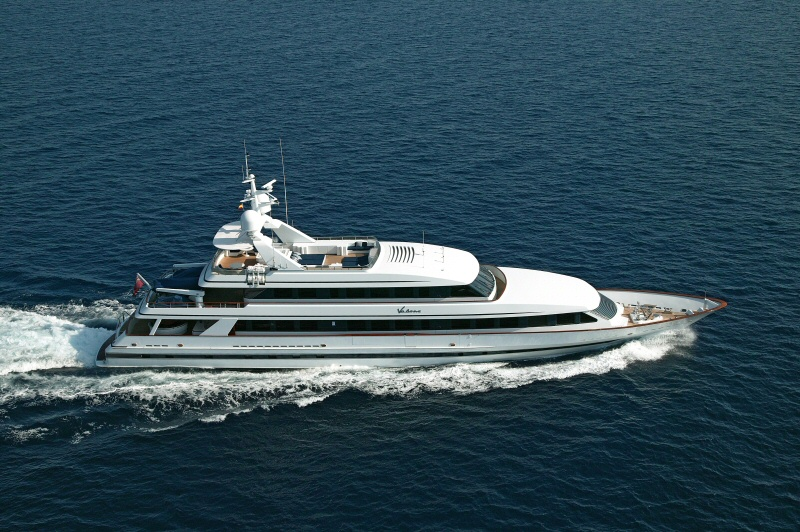
- Va Bene in 2008

History
- Name: Va Bene
- Owner: 2005–present: Eric Clapton; 1997–2005: Bernie Ecclestone
- Builder: Kees Cornelissen
- Launched: 1992
- Acquired: 2005
- Identification: IMO number: 1000447; MMSI number: 319854000; Callsign: ZCIP8
- Status: Currently in service

General characteristics
- Class & type: Luxury yacht
- Length: 156 ft 9 in (47.78 m)
- Beam: 30 ft 2 in (9.19 m)
- Draft: 10 ft 2 in (3.10 m)
- Installed power: 2 × Caterpillar engines; 2,574 kW (3,452 hp)
- Speed: 14 knots (26 km/h; 16 mph)
- Capacity: 12 passengers
- Crew: 13 crew members

MY Va Bene is a luxury yacht designed by Richard Hein and built in 1992 by Kees Cornelissen. Since 2005, it has been owned by rock musician Eric Clapton.

== History ==
In 1992, Va Bene was designed by Richard Hein and built by Kees Cornelissen for a Greek citizen in the Netherlands. In 1997, he sold the yacht to Bernie Ecclestone. Ecclestone started looking for a buyer in 2002. Clapton, who had been looking for a new yacht, contacted Ecclestone in 2005, and purchased the ship for €17 million. Clapton had the yacht refitted from 2007 to 2008.

== Accouterment ==
=== Water sports ===
- Intrepid Tender with 2× 250HP engines
- 2× Zodiac extra boats
- 2× Sea-Doo 1500cc Jetskis
- 2× Kayaks
- 2× Waterskis
- 2× Wakeboards
- Snorkel equipment
- Fishing equipment

=== Accommodation ===
- 1 Master suite
- 4 Duplex suites
- 1 Double bedroom
- Whirlpool
- VSAT, Satellite broadcasting
- Wi-Fi
