= Cream discography =

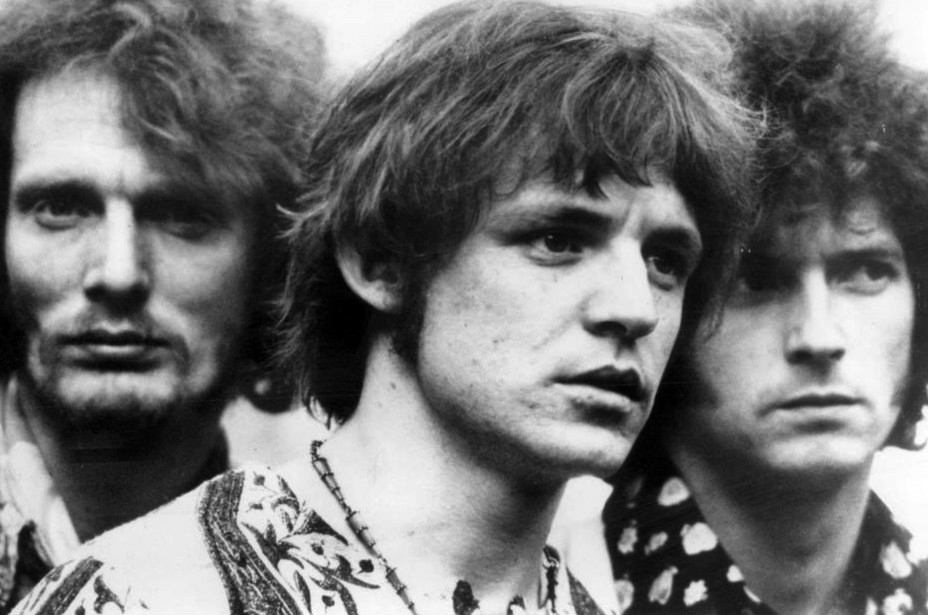
- Cream, 1966. L–R: Ginger Baker, Jack Bruce, and Eric Clapton
- Studio albums: 4
- Live albums: 5
- Compilation albums: 10
- Singles: 10
- Video albums: 6

Cream were a 1960s British rock power trio consisting of drummer Ginger Baker, guitarist/singer Eric Clapton and bassist/singer Jack Bruce. While together they released four albums, the last two being partly recorded live in concert, and ten singles. Since breaking up there have been five albums of music recorded live in concert (including of their brief reunion at the Royal Albert Hall in 2005), and 10 compilation albums.

== Albums ==
=== Studio albums ===
Year	Title and details	Peak chart positions								Certifications
Year	Title and details	UK	AUS	CAN	FRA	FIN	GER	NOR	US	Certifications
1966	Fresh Cream: Released: 9 December 1966 (UK) January 1967 (US); UK Label: Reaction (593/4 001); US Label: Atco (33–206; SD 33–206); Format: mono/stereo LP	6	10	—	20	4	—	—	39	BPI: Gold; RIAA: Gold; ARIA: Gold
1967	Disraeli Gears: Released: November 1967; UK Label: Reaction (593/4 003); US Label: Atco (33–232; SD 33–232); Format: mono/stereo LP	5	1	10	2	1	—	16	4	BPI: Gold; RIAA: Platinum; ARIA: Platinum
1968	Wheels of Fire: Released: 9 August 1968 (UK) 14 June 1968 (US); UK Label: Polydor (582/3 031/2); US Label: Atco (SD 2–700); Format: mono/stereo double LP	3	1	1	2	3	15	16	1	BPI: Silver; RIAA: Platinum; ARIA: Platinum
1969	Goodbye: Released: 5 February 1969; UK Label: Polydor (593 053); US Label: Atco (SD 7001); Format: stereo LP	1	6	5	3	4	9	7	2	BPI: Platinum; RIAA: Gold; ARIA: Gold
"—" denotes releases that did not chart

=== Live albums ===
Year	Title and details	Peak chart positions								Certifications
Year	Title and details	UK	AUS	CAN	FRA	FIN	GER	NOR	US	Certifications
1970	Live Cream: Released: April 1970; UK Label: Polydor (2383 016); US Label: Atco (SD 33–328); Format: stereo LP	4	20	13	15	10	30	15	15	BPI: Platinum
1972	Live Cream Volume II: Released: 2 March 1972; UK Label: Polydor (2383 119); US Label: Atco (SD 7005); Format: stereo LP	15	—	30	27	—	—	—	27	
2003	BBC Sessions: Released: 25 March 2003; Label: Polydor (B0000069–02); Format: CD	100	—	—	—	—	—	—	—	
2005	Royal Albert Hall London May 2-3-5-6, 2005: Released: 4 October 2005; Label: Reprise (49416–2); Format: 2-CD	61	—	—	59	—	11	—	59	BVMI: Gold; GER: Gold
2020	Goodbye Tour: Live 1968: Released: 6 March 2020; Label: Polydor (779529–9); Format: 4-CD box set	—	—	—	—	25	—	—		
"—" denotes releases that did not chart

=== Compilation albums ===
Year	Title and details	Peak chart positions							Certifications
Year	Title and details	UK	AUS	CAN	FIN	GER	NZL	US	Certifications
1969	Best of Cream: Released: 24 October 1969; UK Label: Polydor (583 060); US Label: Atco (SD 33–291); Format: stereo LP	6	6	6	10	29	—	3	BPI: Gold; RIAA: Gold
1972	Heavy Cream: Released: 9 October 1972; UK Label: Polydor (2659 022); US Label: Polydor (PD 3502); Format: stereo double LP	—	—	—	—	—	—	135	
1973	Off the Top: Released: April 1973; Label: Polydor (PD 5529); Format: stereo LP	—	—	—	—	—	—	—	
1983	Strange Brew: The Very Best of Cream: Released: 1983; UK Label: RSO Deluxe (RSO 5021); US Label: RSO (811639–2); Format: stereo LP	—	—	—	—	—	—	205	RIAA: Platinum
1995	The Very Best of Cream: Released: 9 May 1995; Label: Polydor (523752–2); Format: CD	149	—	—	—	—	19	—	BPI: Gold; RIAA: Gold
1997	Those Were the Days: Released: 23 September 1997; Label: Polydor (539000–2); Format: 4-CD box set	—	—	—	—	—	—	—	
2000	20th Century Masters – The Millennium Collection: The Best of Cream: Released: 29 February 2000; Label: Polydor (543498–2); Format: CD	—	—	—	—	—	—	—	
2005	Gold: Released: 26 April 2005; Label: Polydor (B0004193–02); Format: 2-CD	186	—	—	—	—	—	—	
2005	I Feel Free – Ultimate Cream: Released: 31 May 2005; Label: Polydor (987136–2); Format: 2-CD	6	—	—	—	—	—	—	BPI: Gold
2011	Icon: Released: 21 June 2011; Label: Polydor (B0015622–02); Format: CD	—	—	—	—	—	—	—	
2011	Icon 2: Released: 2011; Label: Polydor (B0015816–02); Format: 2-CD	—	—	—	—	—	—	—	
"—" denotes releases that did not chart

== Singles ==
Year	Titles (A-side, B-side) Both sides from same album except where indicated	Peak chart positions									Certifications	Album
Year	Titles (A-side, B-side) Both sides from same album except where indicated	UK	AUS	CAN	FIN	FRA	GER	NLD	US	US CB	Certifications	Album
1966	"Wrapping Paper" b/w "Cat's Squirrel" (from Fresh Cream)	34	—	—	—	—	—	—	—	—		Non-album single
1966	"I Feel Free" b/w "N.S.U."	11	—	—	39	—	27	16	116	—		Best of Cream (UK); Fresh Cream (US)
1967	"Strange Brew" b/w "Tales of Brave Ulysses"	17	21	—	—	28	—	18	—	—		Disraeli Gears
1967	"Spoonful" – Part 1 b/w Part 2	—	—	—	—	—	—	—	—	—		Fresh Cream (UK); Best of Cream (US)
1968	"Sunshine of Your Love" b/w "SWLABR"	25	22	3	—	—	—	17	5	6	BPI: Platinum; RIAA: Gold	Disraeli Gears
1968	"Anyone for Tennis" b/w "Pressed Rat and Warthog" (from Wheels of Fire)	40	—	37	—	—	—	—	64	83		Non-album single
1968	"White Room" b/w "Those Were the Days"	28	1	2	10	73	28	2	6	5	BPI: Gold	Wheels of Fire
1969	"Crossroads" b/w "Passing the Time"	—	—	13	18	70	—	—	28	17		Wheels of Fire
1969	"Badge" b/w "What a Bringdown"	18	43	49	39	—	29	—	60	65		Goodbye
1970	"Lawdy Mama" b/w "Sweet Wine" (from Fresh Cream)	—	—	79	—	—	—	—	—	—		Live Cream
2006	"Sunshine of Your Love" (vs The Hoxtons)	—	31	—	—	—	—	—	—	—		Non-album single
"—" denotes releases that did not chart

== Videos ==
- Farewell Concert – VHS, DVD, recorded Royal Albert Hall, November 1968 (UK: Gold)
- Strange Brew – VHS, DVD, documentary on the band's history, produced in 1991
- Fresh Live Cream – VHS, DVD, documentary filmed just after the Rock & Roll Hall of Fame reunion in 1993 containing band interviews and previously unreleased material
- Royal Albert Hall London May 2-3-5-6, 2005 – DVD, recorded Royal Albert Hall, May 2005 (UK: Platinum), (US: 5× Platinum)
- Classic Albums: Disraeli Gears – DVD, a reflection on what went into making Disraeli Gears and the impact it had on the 60s, produced in 2006 (UK: Gold)
- Cream: Classic Artists – DVD + CD, recorded before and after the Madison Square Garden reunion concerts; features interviews with band members, along with an audio CD containing five previously unreleased tracks from Swedish radio, produced in 2006
