= Gold (Cream album) =

Greatest hits album by Cream
- Released: April 2005
- Recorded: 1966–1968
- Genre: Psychedelic rock; blues rock; hard rock
- Length: 144:30
- Label: Polydor

Cream chronology
BBC Sessions (2003)	Gold (2005)	Royal Albert Hall London, 2–3, 5–6 May 2005 (2005)

Professional ratings
Review scores
Source	Rating
Allmusic	5/5 stars
Tom Hull	B+

Gold is a two-disc compilation album by the British rock band Cream, released in 2005 to help celebrate the band's reunion at the Royal Albert Hall. It was a part of the larger Gold series.

The first disc consists of twenty-one studio tracks, with the second featuring eight live tracks.

The tracks come from the band's four studio albums: Fresh Cream, Disraeli Gears, Wheels of Fire, and Goodbye, as well as Live Cream and Live Cream Volume II (which were released after the band's break up).

Gold was also released under the name I Feel Free – Ultimate Cream, reaching No. 6 on the UK Albums Chart in May 2005. This version was available both as a two-disc release identical to Gold, and as a "limited edition box set" with Cream's 2003 BBC Sessions album included as a third disc.

== Track listing ==
=== Disc one: In the Studio ===
Tracks taken from Fresh Cream (1966):

1. "I Feel Free" (Note: originally released as a non-album single, but included on later prints of the album) (Jack Bruce, Pete Brown) – 2:54
2. "N.S.U." (Bruce) – 2:47
3. "Sweet Wine" (Ginger Baker, Janet Godfrey) – 3:19
4. "I'm So Glad" (Skip James) – 4:01

Tracks taken from Disraeli Gears (1967):

5. "Strange Brew" (Eric Clapton, Felix Pappalardi, Gail Collins) – 2:48
6. "Sunshine of Your Love" (Bruce, Clapton, Brown) – 4:10
7. "World of Pain" (Collins, Pappalardi) – 3:05
8. "Tales of Brave Ulysses" (Clapton, Martin Sharp) – 2:46
9. "SWLABR" (Bruce, Brown) – 2:31
10. "We're Going Wrong" (Bruce) – 3:29

Tracks taken from Wheels of Fire (1968):

11. "White Room" (Bruce, Brown) – 4:58
12. "Sitting on Top of the World" (Walter Vinson, Lonnie Chatmon; arr. Chester Burnett) – 4:59
13. "Passing the Time" (Baker, Mike Taylor) – 4:32
14. "Politician" (Bruce, Brown) – 4:11
15. "Those Were the Days" (Baker, Taylor) – 2:56
16. "Born Under a Bad Sign" (Booker T. Jones, William Bell) – 3:09
17. "Deserted Cities of the Heart" (Bruce, Brown) – 3:41

1968 Single

18. "Anyone for Tennis" (Clapton, Sharp) – 2:37

Tracks taken from Goodbye (1969):

19. "Badge" (Clapton, George Harrison) – 2:46
20. "Doing That Scrapyard Thing" (Bruce, Brown) – 3:16
21. "What a Bringdown" (Baker) – 3:57

=== Disc two: Live ===
1. "N.S.U." (Note: previously released on Live Cream (1970)) (Bruce) – 10:12
2. "Sleepy Time Time" (Bruce, Godfrey) – 6:50
3. "Rollin' and Tumblin'" (Muddy Waters) – 6:34
4. "Spoonful" (Note: previously released on Wheels of Fire (1968)) (Willie Dixon) – 16:46
5. "Crossroads" (Robert Johnson, arr. Clapton) – 4:14
6. "Sunshine of Your Love" (Note: previously released on Live Cream Volume II (1972)) (Bruce, Clapton, Brown) – 7:24
7. "I'm So Glad" (Note: previously released on Goodbye (1969)) (James) – 9:12
8. "Toad" (Baker) – 16:16

Release notes
