= Heavy Cream =

Compilation album by Cream
- Released: 9 October 1972
- Recorded: 1966–1969
- Genres: Psychedelic rock; blues rock; hard rock
- Length: 83:08
- Label: Polydor
- Producer: Felix Pappalardi/Robert Stigwood

Cream chronology
Live Cream Volume II (1972)	Heavy Cream (1972)	Strange Brew (1983)

Heavy Cream is a compilation album of material recorded by the British rock band Cream from 1966 to 1969.

Although available in other territories as well, the album was largely released to address the North American market, in order for Polydor Records to leverage Cream's back catalogue; prior to 1972, Polydor had licensed Cream's recordings to Atco/Atlantic Records for North American distribution. Now out of print, Heavy Cream was available as a double album during the years 1972–76, and was briefly reissued by Polydor's affiliated label RSO Records in 1983.

This double album was also issued simultaneously with 3 other double albums of solo material by Eric Clapton, Jack Bruce and Ginger Baker all titled: "... At His Best"

With 22 tracks, Heavy Cream is one of the more comprehensive collections of Cream's work, containing over two-thirds of the band's studio recordings.

Writing for Newsday in 1972, Robert Christgau regarded the album as the best of the Cream compilations up to that point.

The album reached No. 135 on the Billboard 200.

== Track listing ==
Side 1
No.	Title	Original release	Length
1.	"Strange Brew" (Eric Clapton, Gail Collins Pappalardi, Felix Pappalardi)	Disraeli Gears	2:45
2.	"White Room" (Jack Bruce, Pete Brown)	Wheels of Fire	4:37
3.	"Badge" (Clapton, George Harrison)	Goodbye	2:45
4.	"Spoonful" (Willie Dixon)	Fresh Cream	6:31
5.	"Rollin' and Tumblin'" (Hambone Willie Newbern)	Fresh Cream	4:41

Side 2
No.	Title	Original release	Length
6.	"I Feel Free" (Bruce, Brown)	Fresh Cream	2:54
7.	"Born Under a Bad Sign" (Booker T. Jones, William Bell)	Wheels of Fire	3:08
8.	"Passing the Time" (Ginger Baker, Mike Taylor)	Wheels of Fire	4:31
9.	"As You Said" (Bruce, Brown)	Wheels of Fire	4:19
10.	"Deserted Cities of the Heart" (Bruce, Brown)	Wheels of Fire	3:36

Side 3
No.	Title	Original release	Length
11.	"Cat's Squirrel" (Dr. Isaiah Ross, arr. Clapton, Bruce, Baker)	Fresh Cream	3:05
12.	"Crossroads" (Robert Johnson, arr. Clapton)	Wheels of Fire	4:13
13.	"Sitting on Top of the World" (Walter Vinson, Lonnie Chatmon; arr. Chester Burnett)	Wheels of Fire	4:56
14.	"SWLABR" (Bruce, Brown)	Disraeli Gears	2:31
15.	"What a Bringdown!" (Baker)	Goodbye	3:54
16.	"Tales of Brave Ulysses" (Clapton, Martin Sharp)	Disraeli Gears	2:45

Side 4
No.	Title	Original release	Length
17.	"Take It Back" (Bruce, Brown)	Disraeli Gears	3:04
18.	"Politician" (Bruce, Brown)	Wheels of Fire	4:11
19.	"I'm So Glad" (Skip James)	Fresh Cream	3:55
20.	"Sunshine of Your Love" (Bruce, Brown, Clapton)	Disraeli Gears	4:08
21.	"Those Were the Days" (Baker, Taylor)	Wheels of Fire	2:52
22.	"Doing That Scrapyard Thing" (Bruce, Brown)	Goodbye	3:14

== Personnel ==
=== Cream ===
- Jack Bruce – Bass guitar on all tracks except "What a Bringdown", keyboards, vocals; acoustic guitar on "As You Said"; harmonica on "Spoonful", "Rollin' & Tumblin'", and "Take It Back"
- Eric Clapton – Lead guitar, rhythm guitar on all tracks except "Badge", vocals
- Ginger Baker – Drums, percussion, vocals

=== Additional personnel ===
- Felix Pappalardi – Viola on "White Room" and "Deserted Cities of the Heart"; organ pedals on "Passing the Time"; keyboards on "Badge"; bass guitar on "What a Bringdown"
- George Harrison – Rhythm guitar on "Badge"
