= Those Were the Days (Cream album) =

Box set by Cream
- Released: 23 September 1997
- Recorded: 1966–1968
- Genres: Psychedelic rock; blues rock; hard rock
- Length: 303:12
- Label: Polydor
- Producer: Bill Levenson

Cream chronology
The Very Best of Cream (1995)	Those Were the Days (1997)	20th Century Masters – The Millennium Collection: The Best of Cream (2000)

Professional ratings
Review scores
Source	Rating
AllMusic	4/5 stars
Uncut	3/5 stars

Those Were the Days is a retrospective compilation of music recorded by the British rock band Cream, released on 23 September 1997. It comprises four compact discs and includes almost every studio track released during the band's active lifetime, with the exception of the original "Passing The Time" from Wheels of Fire, and all but three tracks from the live material recorded in 1968 and released on Wheels of Fire, Goodbye, and the two Live Cream volumes of 1970 and 1972. The title is taken from the song written by Ginger Baker and Mike Taylor, released on Wheels of Fire in 1968.

== Track listing ==
=== Disc one: In the Studio ===
Non-album single (1966)

1. "Wrapping Paper" (Jack Bruce, Pete Brown) – 2:22

Fresh Cream (1966)

2. "I Feel Free" (Bruce, Brown) – 2:51
3. "N.S.U." (Bruce) – 2:43
4. "Sleepy Time Time" (Bruce, Janet Godfrey) – 4:20
5. "Dreaming" (Bruce) – 1:58
6. "Sweet Wine" (Ginger Baker, Godfrey) – 3:17
7. "Spoonful" (Willie Dixon) – 6:30
8. "Cat's Squirrel" (Traditional, arr. by Baker, Bruce, Eric Clapton) – 3:03
9. "Four Until Late" (Robert Johnson, arr. by Clapton) – 2:07
10. "Rollin' and Tumblin'" (Muddy Waters) – 4:42
11. "I'm So Glad" (Skip James) – 3:57
12. "Toad" (Baker) – 5:11

Studio outtake (1967)

13. "Lawdy Mama" version 1 ^{1} (Traditional, arr. by Clapton) – 2:00

Disraeli Gears (1967)

14. "Strange Brew" (Clapton, Gail Collins, Felix Pappalardi) – 2:46
15. "Sunshine of Your Love" (Bruce, Brown, Clapton) – 4:10
16. "World of Pain" (Collins, Pappalardi) – 3:02
17. "Dance the Night Away" (Bruce, Brown) – 3:34
18. "Blue Condition" (Baker) – 3:29
19. "Tales of Brave Ulysses" (Clapton, Martin Sharp) – 2:46
20. "SWLABR" (Bruce, Brown) – 2:31
21. "We're Going Wrong" (Bruce) – 3:26
22. "Outside Woman Blues" (Blind Joe Reynolds, arr. by Clapton) – 2:24
23. "Take It Back" (Bruce, Brown) – 3:05
24. "Mother's Lament" (Traditional, arr. Baker, Bruce, Clapton) – 1:47

=== Disc two: In the Studio ===
Studio disc of Wheels of Fire (1968)

1. "White Room" (Bruce, Brown) – 4:58
2. "Sitting on Top of the World" (Walter Vinson, Lonnie Chatmon; arr. Chester Burnett) – 4:58
3. "Passing the Time" alternate version ^{1} (Baker, Mike Taylor) – 5:53
4. "As You Said" (Bruce, Brown) – 4:20
5. "Pressed Rat and Warthog" (Baker, Taylor) – 3:13
6. "Politician" (Bruce, Brown) – 4:12
7. "Those Were the Days" (Baker, Taylor) – 2:53
8. "Born Under a Bad Sign" (Booker T. Jones, William Bell) – 3:09
9. "Deserted Cities of the Heart" (Bruce, Brown) – 3:38

Non-album single (1968)

10. "Anyone for Tennis" (The Savage Seven theme) (Clapton, Sharp) – 2:38

Studio tracks from Goodbye (1969)

11. "Badge" (Clapton, George Harrison) – 2:44
12. "Doing That Scrapyard Thing" (Bruce, Brown) – 3:14
13. "What a Bringdown" (Baker) – 3:58

Miscellaneous tracks

14. "The Coffee Song" ^{6} (Tony Colton, Ray Smith) – 2:44
15. "Lawdy Mama" version 2 ^{4} (Traditional, arr. Clapton) – 2:46
16. "You Make Me Feel" demo version ^{1} (Bruce, Brown) – 2:39
17. "We're Going Wrong" demo version ^{1} (Bruce) – 3:49
18. "Hey Now Princess" demo version ^{1} (Bruce, Brown) – 3:31
19. "SWLABR" demo version ^{1} (Bruce, Brown) – 4:30
20. "Weird of Hermiston" demo version ^{1} (Bruce, Brown) – 3:12
21. "The Clearout" demo version ^{1} (Bruce, Brown) – 3:58
22. "Falstaff Beer Commercial" ^{1} (Baker, Bruce, Clapton) – 1:00

=== Disc three: Live ===
1. "N.S.U." alternate version ^{1} (Bruce) – 12:38

Recorded 9 March 1968 at the Winterland Ballroom, San Francisco, California

2. "Sleepy Time Time" ^{4} (Bruce, Godfrey) – 6:48

Recorded 9 March 1968 at the Winterland Ballroom, San Francisco, California

3. "Rollin' and Tumblin'" ^{4} (Waters) – 6:29

Recorded 7 March 1968 at Fillmore West, San Francisco, California

4. "Crossroads" ^{2} (Johnson, arr. Clapton) – 4:24

Recorded 10 March 1968 at the Fillmore West, San Francisco, California

5. "Spoonful" ^{2} (Dixon) – 16:39

Recorded 10 March 1968 at the Fillmore West, San Francisco, California

6. "Tales of Brave Ulysses" ^{5} (Clapton, Sharp) – 4:43

Recorded 10 March 1968 at the Winterland Ballroom, San Francisco, California

7. "Sunshine of Your Love" ^{5} (Bruce, Brown, Clapton) – 7:25

Recorded 9 March 1968 at the Winterland Ballroom, San Francisco, California

8. "Sweet Wine" ^{4} (Baker, Godfrey) – 15:08

Recorded 10 March 1968 at the Winterland Ballroom, San Francisco, California

=== Disc four: Live ===
1. "White Room" ^{5} (Bruce, Brown) – 6:21

Recorded 4 October 1968 at the Oakland Coliseum Arena, Oakland, California

2. "Politician" ^{5} (Bruce, Brown) – 5:08

Recorded 4 October 1968 at the Oakland Coliseum Arena, Oakland, California

3. "I'm So Glad" ^{3} (James) – 9:32

Recorded 19 October 1968 at The Forum, Inglewood, Los Angeles, California

4. "Sitting on Top of the World" ^{3} (Vinson, Chatmon; arr. Burnett) – 4:55

Recorded 19 October 1968 at The Forum, Inglewood, Los Angeles, California

5. "Steppin' Out" ^{5} (James Bracken) – 13:29

Recorded 10 March 1968 at the Winterland Ballroom, San Francisco, California

6. "Traintime" ^{2} (Bruce) – 7:02

Recorded 8 March 1968 at the Winterland Ballroom, San Francisco, California

7. "Toad" extended version ^{1} (Baker) – 17:35

Recorded 7–8 March 1968 at Fillmore West, San Francisco, California

8. "Deserted Cities of the Heart" ^{5} (Bruce, Brown) – 4:14

Recorded 4 October 1968 at the Oakland Coliseum Arena, Oakland, California

9. "Sunshine of Your Love" ^{1} (Bruce, Brown, Clapton) – 4:44

Recorded May 1968 at CBS Studios, Los Angeles for the Glen Campbell Show

=== Release notes ===
^1 Previously unreleased
^2 Originally released on Wheels of Fire (1968)
^3 Originally released on Goodbye (1969)
^4 Originally released on Live Cream (1970)
^5 Originally released on Live Cream Volume II (1972)
^6 Originally released on Fresh Cream (Polydor UK reissue, 1974)

=== Omitted from this collection ===
- "Passing the Time" – studio version from Wheels of Fire (1968)

Replaced by an alternate version (1:22 min longer) that "features material edited from the original release"

- "Toad" – live version from Wheels of Fire (1968) – Recorded 7 March 1968 at Filmore West, San Francisco, California

Replaced by an extended version (1:20 min longer), incorporating material recorded on 8 March 1968, which includes an edited-in extended group jam, after the opening riffs and before the original guitar/bass/drums lead into the solo

- "Politician" – live version from Goodbye (1969) – Recorded 19 October 1968 at The Forum, Inglewood, Los Angeles, California

Omitted in favour of the version (1:11 min shorter) released on Live Cream Volume II, recorded on 4 October 1968

- "N.S.U." – live version from Live Cream (1970) – Recorded 10 March 1968 at the Winterland Ballroom, San Francisco, California

Replaced by a longer alternative version (2:23 min longer) recorded on 9 March 1968
