= BBC Sessions (Cream album) =

Live album by Cream
- Released: 14 April 2003
- Recorded: 1966–1968
- Venues: BBC Playhouse Theatre, London; Aeolian 2, London; BBC Home Service; Maida Vale 4, London
- Genres: Blues-rock, psychedelic rock, hard rock
- Length: 68:30
- Label: Polydor
- Producers: Bill Bebb; Bernie Andrews; Jeff Griffin; Bev Phillips

Cream chronology
| 20th Century Masters – The Millennium Collection: The Best of Cream (2000) | BBC Sessions (2003) | Gold (2005) |

Professional ratings
Review scores
| Source | Rating |
|---|---|
| AllMusic | 4/5 stars |

BBC Sessions is a live album by the British rock band Cream, released on 25 May 2003 on Polydor Records. It contains 22 tracks and 4 interviews recorded live at the BBC studios in London.

Between 21 October 1966 and 9 January 1968, Cream recorded eight sessions for the BBC radio network, selected highlights from seven of which are featured in chronological order on this collection.

Only the versions of "Steppin' Out" and "Lawdy Mama" had been previously released, although both were released on Eric Clapton's Crossroads box set, not by the band itself.

BBC Sessions was later included as the third disc in the "limited edition box set" release of Cream's 2005 compilation album I Feel Free – Ultimate Cream (also known as Gold).

== Track listing ==
| No. | Title | Recording and broadcast details | Length |
|---|---|---|---|
| 1. | "Sweet Wine" (Ginger Baker, Janet Godfrey) | Recorded at BBC Playhouse Theatre, 8 November 1966. Broadcast on Saturday Club, 11 November 1966. | 3:27 |
| 2. | "Eric Clapton Interview 1" | Recorded at BBC Playhouse Theatre, 8 November 1966. Broadcast on Saturday Club, 11 November 1966. | 0:54 |
| 3. | "Wrapping Paper" (Jack Bruce, Pete Brown) | Recorded at BBC Playhouse Theatre, 8 November 1966. Broadcast on Saturday Club, 11 November 1966. | 2:29 |
| 4. | "Rollin' and Tumblin'" (Hambone Willie Newbern) | Recorded at BBC Playhouse Theatre, 8 November 1966. Broadcast on Saturday Club, 11 November 1966. | 3:02 |
| 5. | "Steppin' Out" (James Bracken) | Recorded at BBC Playhouse Theatre, 8 November 1966. Broadcast on Saturday Club, 11 November 1966. | 1:50 |
| 6. | "Crossroads" (Robert Johnson, arr. Eric Clapton) | Recorded at Aeolian 2, 28 November 1966. Broadcast on Guitar Club, 30 December 1966. | 1:53 |
| 7. | "Cat's Squirrel (Instrumental)" (Traditional, arr. S. Splurge) | Recorded at Maida Vale 4, 9 December 1966. Broadcast on Rhythm & Blues, 9 January 1967. | 3:38 |
| 8. | "Traintime" (Bruce) | Recorded at Maida Vale 4, 9 December 1966. Broadcast on Rhythm & Blues, 9 January 1967. | 2:50 |
| 9. | "I'm So Glad" (Skip James) | Recorded at Maida Vale 4, 9 December 1966. Broadcast on Rhythm & Blues, 9 January 1967. | 4:22 |
| 10. | "Lawdy Mama" (Traditional, arr. Clapton) | Recorded at Maida Vale 4, 9 December 1966. Broadcast on Rhythm & Blues, 9 January 1967. | 1:53 |
| 11. | "Eric Clapton Interview 2" | Recorded at BBC Playhouse Theatre, 10 January 1967. Broadcast on Saturday Club, 14 January 1967. | 0:48 |
| 12. | "I Feel Free" (Bruce, Brown) | Recorded at BBC Playhouse Theatre, 10 January 1967. Broadcast on Saturday Club, 14 January 1967. | 2:54 |
| 13. | "N.S.U." (Bruce) | Recorded at BBC Playhouse Theatre, 10 January 1967. Broadcast on Saturday Club, 14 January 1967. | 2:55 |
| 14. | "Four Until Late" (Johnson, arr. Clapton) | Recorded at BBC Playhouse Theatre, 10 January 1967. Broadcast on Saturday Club, 14 January 1967. | 1:55 |
| 15. | "Strange Brew" (Clapton, Felix Pappalardi, Gail Collins Pappalardi) | Recorded at BBC Playhouse Theatre, 30 May 1967. Broadcast on Saturday Club, 3 June 1967. | 3:00 |
| 16. | "Eric Clapton Interview 3" | Recorded at BBC Playhouse Theatre, 30 May 1967. Broadcast on Saturday Club, 3 June 1967. | 0:44 |
| 17. | "Tales of Brave Ulysses" (Clapton, Martin Sharp) | Recorded at BBC Playhouse Theatre, 30 May 1967. Broadcast on Saturday Club, 3 June 1967. | 2:55 |
| 18. | "We're Going Wrong" (Bruce) | Recorded at BBC Playhouse Theatre, 30 May 1967. Broadcast on Saturday Club, 3 June 1967. | 3:25 |
| 19. | "Eric Clapton Interview 4" | Recorded at Aeolian 2, 24 October 1967. Broadcast on Top Gear, 29 October 1967. | 0:37 |
| 20. | "Born Under a Bad Sign" (Booker T. Jones, William Bell) | Recorded at Aeolian 2, 24 October 1967. Broadcast on Top Gear, 29 October 1967. | 3:03 |
| 21. | "Outside Woman Blues" (Blind Joe Reynolds) | Recorded at Aeolian 2, 24 October 1967. Broadcast on Top Gear, 29 October 1967. | 3:18 |
| 22. | "Take It Back" (Bruce, Brown) | Recorded at Aeolian 2, 24 October 1967. Broadcast on Top Gear, 29 October 1967. | 2:17 |
| 23. | "Sunshine of Your Love" (Guitar solo)" (Clapton, Bruce, Brown) | Recorded at Aeolian 2, 24 October 1967. Broadcast on Top Gear, 29 October 1967. | 4:08 |
| 24. | "Politician" (Bruce, Brown) | Recorded at Aeolian 2, 9 January 1968. Broadcast on Top Gear, 14 January 1968. | 3:59 |
| 25. | "SWLABR" (Bruce, Brown) | Recorded at Aeolian 2, 9 January 1968. Broadcast on Top Gear, 14 January 1968. | 2:32 |
| 26. | "Steppin' Out (Instrumental)" (Bracken) | Recorded at Aeolian 2, 9 January 1968. Broadcast on Top Gear, 14 January 1968. | 3:37 |

== Omissions ==
Whilst a recording exists in private hands, this collection includes no material from Cream's first BBC session on 21 October 1966 at Maida Vale 4, London as broadcast on Band Beat, BBC World Service, 21 November 1966. The tracks recorded at this session were "Sleepy Time Time", "Rollin' and Tumblin'" and "Spoonful".

Other songs missing from this collection:

- "Sleepy Time Time" and "I'm So Glad" from the Saturday Club session recorded 8 November 1966 at the BBC Playhouse Theatre.
- "Sitting on Top of the World" and "Steppin' Out" from the Guitar Club session recorded 28 November 1966 at Aeolian 2.
- "Traintime" and "Toad" from the Saturday Club session recorded 10 January 1967 at the BBC Playhouse Theatre.
- "Tales of Brave Ulysses" from the Top Gear session recorded 24 October 1967 at Aeolian 2.
- "Blue Condition" and "We're Going Wrong" from the Top Gear session recorded 9 January 1968 at Aeolian 2.

== Personnel ==
- Eric Clapton – guitar, vocals
- Jack Bruce – bass, lead vocals, harmonica
- Ginger Baker – drums, percussion, vocals
