= We're Going Wrong =

Song by Cream

from the album Disraeli Gears
- Released: November 1967
- Recorded: May 1967 at Atlantic Studios, New York City
- Genre: Psychedelia
- Length: 3:27
- Label: Reaction (UK); Atco (U.S.); Polydor (U.S. Reissue)
- Songwriter: Jack Bruce
- Producer: Felix Pappalardi

Audio sample
- "We're Going Wrong": file; help

"We're Going Wrong" is a song by British supergroup Cream from the album Disraeli Gears. The song was written by bassist Jack Bruce and was the only song on Gears that Jack wrote without lyricist Pete Brown.

== Song structure ==
With the song's lyrics being only two stanzas long, Jack Bruce's vocals are stretched out throughout the length of the song and are backed by Eric Clapton's psychedelic-style guitar work and Ginger Baker's drum beat which, at least when played live, uses Timpani drum mallets instead of regular drumsticks. The 6/4 time signature also gives the song a distinct and irregular sound. Bruce's vocals are falsetto and crooning-like and are accompanied with a slow bass line and a bluesy, psychedelic guitar melody; however Baker's drumming is often frenetic and fast-paced, making it completely at odds with the rest of the instruments.

== Live history ==
Many of the tracks on Disraeli Gears, including "Sunshine of Your Love", were dropped from Cream's live set in late-1967 and replaced by longer tracks such as the rendition of "Spoonful" and Ginger Baker's instrumental "Toad". "We're Going Wrong", however, achieved occasional play time.

== Live album discography ==
The following Cream live albums releases featured "We're Going Wrong":

1. BBC Sessions
  - Recorded: 30 May 1967 at the BBC Playhouse Theatre, London.
  - Later released on the Disraeli Gears Deluxe Edition
2. Royal Albert Hall
  - The fourteenth song played in the setlist.

== Compilation appearances ==
The following Cream compilation albums releases featured "We're Going Wrong":

1. The Very Best of Cream
2. Those Were the Days
3. I Feel Free – Ultimate Cream

== Jack Bruce solo versions ==
A live cover version of the song, recorded 19 August 1971 was released on Bruce's 1995 live release BBC Live in Concert and later released in 2008 on Spirit. Another live cover appeared on his 2003 release More Jack Than God. Another live version was released on HR Big Band Featuring Jack Bruce.
