= 20th Century Masters – The Millennium Collection: The Best of Cream =

Compilation album by Cream
- Released: 29 February 2000
- Genre: Rock
- Length: 41:37
- Label: Polydor
- Producer: Bill Levenson

Cream chronology
Those Were the Days (1995)	20th Century Masters – The Millennium Collection: The Best of Cream (2000)	BBC Sessions (2003)

20th Century Masters – The Millennium Collection: The Best of Cream is a compilation album by the English rock trio Cream released on Polydor Records on 29 February 2000. The album contains hits from their pre-1970s material.

== Reception ==
Professional ratings
Review scores
Source	Rating
AllMusic	3/5 stars
The New Rolling Stone Album Guide	4/5 stars

Stephen Thomas Erlewine stated in a review for the album on AllMusic that it did not contain the band's greatest hits, going on to state that "if you're curious, you're advised to dig deeper than this."

== Track listing ==
20th Century Masters – The Millennium Collection: The Best of Cream track listing
No.	Title	Length
1.	"I Feel Free"	2:53
2.	"N.S.U."	2:45
3.	"Sweet Wine"	3:20
4.	"Spoonful"	6:31
5.	"Strange Brew"	2:49
6.	"Sunshine of Your Love"	4:11
7.	"Tales of Brave Ulysses"	2:50
8.	"White Room"	5:00
9.	"Politician"	4:15
10.	"Crossroads" (live)	4:18
11.	"Badge"	2:45
Total length:		41:37

== Personnel ==
Cream

- Eric Clapton – lead and rhythm guitars, lead vocals (5–6, 10–11), backing vocals
- Jack Bruce – bass, lead vocals (1–4, 7–9), piano (1)
- Ginger Baker – drums, percussion, timpani (8), backing vocals (1)

Additional personnel

- Felix Pappalardi – viola (8), keyboards
- George Harrison ("L'Angelo Misterioso") – rhythm guitar (11)
