= Farewell Concert =

- Directed by: Tony Palmer
- Produced by: Robert Stigwood
- Starring: Cream
- Cinematography: Willy Kurant; Gabor Pogany
- Release date: 5 January 1969
- Country: United Kingdom

Farewell Concert is the live recording of the band Cream's final concert at the Royal Albert Hall on 26 November 1968. Aside from the band's reunion concert in 2005 it is Cream's only official full concert release on video. It was originally broadcast by the BBC on 5 January 1969. It was not released on video in the US until 1977. The opening acts for the concert were future progressive rock stars Yes, who were just starting out, and Taste, an Irish trio led by Rory Gallagher.

== Versions ==
There are in fact several versions of this film. They are as follows -

Original theatrical release

- Created by Director Tony Palmer and distributed by manager Robert Stigwood, this was a documentary style film, incorporated live performances, narration by BBC announcer Patrick Allen, and interviews with the band members themselves showcasing their playing abilities (actually filmed in late 1967 or early 1968). Duration was 84 minutes.
- In 1977, a shorter version of the above film, presenting the footage in edited form, now lasting 51 minutes, was released on home video.

Television version

- The first BBC Television broadcast - Containing the same songs as the 1977 version (and lasting the same length), but featuring narration from Radio One DJ Pete Drummond, and a different introduction and BBC end credits. (Note - The narrations by both Drummond and Allen are virtually identical.) This was also on the official DVD release.
- A music only version, shown by the BBC in 1980 (The end credits show "MCMLXXX"), which was 30 minutes long, featuring just five complete songs, with no narration or interviews.

In 2005, a special extended edition of the concert appeared featuring full versions of all songs separated from the narration and interviews. Lasting 80 minutes, it was released on the official DVD reissue. The new version featured digitally remastered sound and video including three bonus songs. A short clip of White Room from the second set (the film used the version from the first show), together with D.J. John Peel introducing the band onstage, was shown on the BBC1 programme "The Rock And Roll Years" in the late 1980s.

In June 2014, it was given a Blu-ray / DVD release.

Album release In March 2020, the concert was released as part of the live album Goodbye Tour - Live 1968, being the first time the Royal Albert Hall concert was officially released via audio format. The sound of this Royal Albert hall concert is much worse than the sound of the other 3 shows of this box set.

== Criticism ==
The original film has often been criticized for both its mediocre sound and visual effects:

The audio is a turgid sonic sludge. The visuals are even worse, with director Tony Palmer jerking the camera around as if this were an episode of NYPD Blue, layering the picture with dated and distracting psychedelic light effects, and providing far too many close-ups of Bruce's teeth (and almost no wide shots of the entire band).

The band had performed two sets at the Albert Hall, but it is believed only the second set was filmed in its entirety. Several times during the performance, it is apparent that the on-screen shot is not in sync with the audio. In fact, in several songs, including during Ginger Baker's drum solo, he seems to change clothes at lightning speed due to careless post-editing, as well as Eric Clapton playing two different guitars. This is because footage from both sets, with the band wearing different clothes and Clapton using a Gibson Firebird for the first set, a Gibson 335 for the second, were edited together. The BBC used four static cameras and two hand held cams, all recording onto video tape, whilst Palmer himself filmed footage at the front of the stage, utilising a 16mm film camera. The difference in quality can be detected easily during the broadcast. However, the BBC "Pete Drummond" version was better quality overall, and is the only version that has these 16mm film clips removed – the remastered release on the 2005 DVD presents both audio and video in excellent quality.

Ginger Baker himself has lashed out in an interview against the Farewell Concert video, stating: "Cream was so much better than that." Nonetheless, most Cream fans regard the actual performance with great enthusiasm, disregarding the poor quality of the video.

== Track listing ==
=== Original video release (Both Patrick Allen narrated film & Pete Drummond narrated BBC broadcast) ===
1. "Sunshine of Your Love"
2. "Politician"
3. "White Room"
4. "Spoonful"
5. "Toad"
6. "I'm So Glad"

=== Extended DVD edition (Patrick Allen narrated film) ===
1. "Sunshine of Your Love"
2. "White Room"
3. "Politician"
4. "Crossroads"
5. "Steppin' Out"
6. "Sitting on Top of the World"
7. "Spoonful"
8. "Toad"
9. "I'm So Glad"

=== BBC broadcast (1980 repeat, no narration) ===
1. "White Room"
2. "Politician"
3. "Sitting On Top Of The World"
4. "I'm So Glad"
5. "Sunshine Of Your Love"

=== Appearance on Goodbye Tour-Live 1968 ===
1. "White Room"
2. "Politician"
3. "I'm So Glad"
4. "Sitting On Top Of The World"
5. "Crossroads"
6. "Toad"
7. "Spoonful"
8. "Sunshine Of Your Love"
9. "Steppin' Out"
