= Best of Cream =

1969 greatest hits album by Cream

Greatest hits album by Cream
- Released: 7 July 1969
- Recorded: 1966–1968
- Genres: Psychedelic rock; blues rock; hard rock
- Length: 34:45
- Labels: Atco; RSO; Polydor
- Producers: Felix Pappalardi; Robert Stigwood

Cream chronology
Goodbye (1969)	Best of Cream (1969)	Live Cream (1970)

Eric Clapton chronology
Best of Cream (1969)	Blind Faith (1969)

Best of Cream is a compilation album of material recorded from 1966 to 1968 by the rock band Cream and released shortly after their disbanding. It was originally released by Cream's US label Atco (Atlantic) Records (catalog no. SD 33-291) on 7 July 1969 and was available on that label during the years 1969–1972. It got a UK release on 24 October 1969 on Polydor Records, who also issued the album in other territories outside the US. The album was briefly reissued in the US in 1977 by RSO/Polydor, to whom US distribution rights for Cream's recordings had reverted by that time. The album was reissued in 1980 in Germany by RSO. A re-release was pressed in 2014 by Polydor on 180g vinyl (catalog no. 535 113-8).

Best of Cream was noteworthy upon its release as the first American record to contain Cream's studio recording of "Spoonful". Although included in international versions of Cream's 1966 debut album Fresh Cream, the song was deleted from Atco's initial U.S. release of the album, and replaced with the band's first hit single "I Feel Free". US reissues of Fresh Cream contain both songs.

The cover art is by American visual artist Jim Dine which featured a drawing of colored vegetables, including pumpkins and cucumbers, with the word "eggplant" under a drawing of that vegetable.

The album peaked at No. 3 on the US Billboard 200 album chart in July 1969. and reached No. 6 on the UK Albums Chart. It was certified Gold by the RIAA.

== Track listing ==
=== Side 1 ===
1. "Sunshine of Your Love" (Jack Bruce, Pete Brown, Eric Clapton) – 4:08
  - Uncut version, from Cream's second album Disraeli Gears (1967), produced by Felix Pappalardi. Vocals: Jack Bruce/Eric Clapton.
2. "Badge" (Clapton, George Harrison) – 2:45
  - From Cream's fourth (and last original) album Goodbye (1969), produced by Felix Pappalardi. Vocal: Eric Clapton.
3. "Crossroads" (Robert Johnson, arr. Clapton) – 4:13
  - From Cream's third album Wheels of Fire (1968), produced by Felix Pappalardi. Recorded live at Winterland, San Francisco, California, 10 March 1968. Vocal: Eric Clapton.
4. "White Room" (Bruce, Brown) – 3:04
  - 45 RPM single edit; uncut version appears on Wheels of Fire. Produced by Felix Pappalardi. Vocal: Jack Bruce.
  - Early Spanish Polydor issues of the album (catalog no. 184298) include the uncut version of the song, running time 4:58.
5. "SWLABR" (Bruce, Brown) – 2:31
  - From Disraeli Gears. Produced by Felix Pappalardi. Vocal: Jack Bruce.

=== Side 2 ===
1. "Born Under a Bad Sign" (Booker T. Jones, William Bell) – 3:08
  - From Wheels of Fire. Produced by Felix Pappalardi. Vocal: Jack Bruce.
2. "Spoonful" (Willie Dixon) – 6:30
  - Uncut version, from the international version of Cream's first album Fresh Cream (1966). Produced by Robert Stigwood. Vocal: Jack Bruce.
3. "Tales of Brave Ulysses" (Clapton, Martin Sharp) – 2:50
  - From Disraeli Gears. Produced by Felix Pappalardi. Vocal: Jack Bruce.
4. "Strange Brew" (Clapton, Felix Pappalardi, Gail Collins Pappalardi) – 2:45
  - From Disraeli Gears. Produced by Felix Pappalardi. Vocal: Eric Clapton.
5. "I Feel Free" (Bruce, Brown) – 2:51
  - From the U.S. version of Fresh Cream. Produced by Robert Stigwood. Vocals: Jack Bruce/Eric Clapton.

== Personnel ==
=== Cream ===
- Jack Bruce – bass guitar, keyboards, vocals, harmonica on "Spoonful"
- Eric Clapton – lead guitar, rhythm guitar, vocals
- Ginger Baker – drums, percussion, vocals

=== Additional personnel ===
- Felix Pappalardi – piano, viola
- George Harrison – rhythm guitar and backing vocals on "Badge"

== Charts ==
Chart (1969)	Peak position
Australian Albums (Kent Music Report)	6
Canada Top Albums/CDs (RPM)	8
Finnish Albums (Soumen Virallinen)	10
German Albums (Offizielle Top 100)	29
UK Albums (Official Charts)	6
US Billboard 200	3

== Certifications ==
Region	Certification	Certified units/sales
United States (RIAA)	Gold	500,000^{^}
^{^} Shipments figures based on certification alone.
