= Doing That Scrapyard Thing =

Song by Cream

from the album Goodbye
- Released: 5 February 1969
- Recorded: October 1968
- Studio: IBC, London
- Genre: Blues rock; psychedelic rock
- Length: 3:14
- Label: Polydor (UK); Atco (US)
- Composer: Jack Bruce
- Lyricist: Pete Brown
- Producer: Felix Pappalardi

"Doing That Scrapyard Thing" is a song from British group Cream's 1969 farewell album, Goodbye. Composed by the band's bassist, Jack Bruce, with lyrics by Pete Brown, the song, alongside Eric Clapton's "Badge" and Ginger Baker's "What a Bringdown," was one of Cream's final studio recordings.

== Background ==
According to Pete Brown, Jack Bruce approached him to write the lyrics of the song in a telephone call:

A funny thing happened with Goodbye. Dick Heckstall-Smith was living with me at the time as his marriage had just broken up. Jack [Bruce] was staying in Los Angeles and called me from there at 3 AM. He said, 'I want you to write the words to this song.' And he played me a theme over the phone, which I recorded on an terrible old Grundig tape recorder. I wrote the lyrics and then phoned him back. That song was 'Doing that Scrapyard Thing'.

— Pete Brown

Eric Clapton explained that the song, along with the other studio cuts from Goodbye, was recorded due to a lack of proper live material for the album:

We did those cuts after we decided to break up. That was after the last tour — the farewell tour. We were told by Atlantic [Records] that we didn't really have enough live stuff to release on the Goodbye album that was acceptable. So we had to go into the studio and cut some tracks after the tour. We all had bits of songs, so we went into the studio in L.A. and cut them — all in the space of three or four days.

— Eric Clapton

== Release and reception ==
"Doing That Scrapyard Thing" was released on Goodbye in February 1969. In some European countries, the song was used as the B-side of "Badge" instead of "What a Bringdown". AllMusic critic Stephen Thomas Erlewine praised the song as "an overstuffed near-masterpiece filled with wonderful, imaginative eccentricities."

== Personnel ==
- Eric Clapton – guitar
- Jack Bruce – bass, vocals, piano
- Ginger Baker – drums
- Felix Pappalardi – Mellotron
