= Royal Albert Hall London May 2-3-5-6, 2005 =

Live album by Cream
- Released: 4 October 2005
- Recorded: May 2–3, 5–6, 2005
- Venue: Royal Albert Hall, London, England
- Genre: Blues-rock, psychedelic rock, hard rock
- Length: 115:35
- Label: Reprise
- Producer: Simon Climie

Cream chronology
Cream Gold (2005)	Royal Albert Hall London May 2-3-5-6, 2005 (2005)

Royal Albert Hall London May 2-3-5-6, 2005 is a live album by the British rock band Cream, recorded at the Royal Albert Hall in 2005 during the band's reunion tour. As the title implies, the recording includes songs from their four reunion shows on 2, 3, 5, and 6 May 2005.

Within five months of these performances, this collection of recordings was released as separate double Compact Disc and double DVD sets. Two months later in December, a triple LP set was also released, containing tracks identical to the CD set. A Blu-ray version also exists.

The album reached No. 59 on the Billboard 200 album chart on 22 October 2005.

== Reception ==
=== Critical ===
In his retrospective review for Allmusic, Stephen Thomas Erlewine said that the shows at the Royal Albert Hall did not live up to Cream's concerts in the past, including their 1993 induction performance for the Rock and Roll Hall of Fame, not necessarily all because of their age, but primarily having not played together for quite some time. J. D. Considine spoke much more highly of the shows because Cream were not as fixated with psychedelic jam sessions and sounded better than before.

Professional ratings
Review scores
Source	Rating
Allmusic	3/5 stars
Blender	4/5 stars

== Compact Disc track listing ==
Disc one

1. "I'm So Glad" (Skip James) – 6:18
2. "Spoonful" (Willie Dixon) – 7:29
3. "Outside Woman Blues" (Blind Joe Reynolds, arr. Clapton) – 4:33
4. "Pressed Rat and Warthog" (Ginger Baker, Mike Taylor) – 3:21
5. "Sleepy Time Time" ^{1} (Jack Bruce, Janet Godfrey) – 6:08
6. "N.S.U." (Bruce) – 6:02
7. "Badge" ^{1} (Eric Clapton, George Harrison) – 3:59
8. "Politician" (Bruce, Pete Brown) – 5:08
9. "Sweet Wine" (Baker, Godfrey) – 6:28
10. "Rollin' and Tumblin'" (Hambone Willie Newbern) – 5:02
11. "Stormy Monday" ^{2} (T-Bone Walker) – 8:09
12. "Deserted Cities of the Heart" (Bruce, Brown) – 3:56

Disc two

1. "Born Under a Bad Sign" (William Bell, Booker T. Jones) – 5:31
2. "We're Going Wrong" (Bruce) – 8:26
3. "Crossroads" (Robert Johnson, arr. Clapton) – 4:25
4. "White Room" ^{1} (Bruce, Brown) – 5:39
5. "Toad" (drum solo) ^{2} (Baker) – 10:07
6. "Sunshine of Your Love" ^{1} (Bruce, Clapton, Brown) – 8:46
7. "Sleepy Time Time" ^{1} (Alternate) (Bruce, Godfrey) – 6:07

== DVD track listing ==
Disc one

1. "I'm So Glad" (James)
2. "Spoonful" (Dixon)
3. "Outside Woman Blues" (Reynolds; arr. Clapton)
4. "Pressed Rat and Warthog" (Baker, Taylor)
5. "Sleepy Time Time" ^{1} (Bruce, Godfrey)
6. "N.S.U." (Bruce)
7. "Badge" ^{1} (Clapton, Harrison)
8. "Politician" (Bruce, Brown)
9. "Sweet Wine" (Baker, Godfrey)
10. "Rollin' and Tumblin'" (Newbern)
11. "Stormy Monday" ^{2} (Walker)
12. "Deserted Cities of the Heart" ^{1} (Bruce, Brown)
13. "Born Under a Bad Sign" (Bell, Jones)
14. "We're Going Wrong" (Bruce)
- "Sleepy Time Time" (Alternate Take) (Bruce, Godfrey) (Extra feature)
- "We're Going Wrong" (Alternate Take) ^{1} (Bruce) (Extra feature)

Disc two

15. "Crossroads" (Johnson; arr. Clapton)
16. "Sitting on Top of the World" (Walter Vinson, Lonnie Chatmon; arr. Chester Burnett)
17. "White Room" ^{1} (Bruce, Brown)
18. "Toad" ^{2} (Baker)
19. "Sunshine of Your Love" ^{1} (Bruce, Clapton, Brown)
- "Sunshine of Your Love" (Alternate Take) (Bruce, Clapton, Brown) (Extra feature)
- Interviews with Baker, Bruce and Clapton (Extra feature)

== Notes ==
- Although the title mentions all four dates Cream played in May 2005, these releases contain no performances recorded 2 May. However, there is a brief clip shown on the DVD of Clapton speaking to the crowd recorded on the first night.
- ^1 These tracks recorded 3 May.
- ^2 These tracks recorded 5 May.
- All other tracks recorded 6 May.

The recording of "Sitting on Top of the World", the alternate takes of "We're Going Wrong" and "Sunshine of Your Love" and the interviews are exclusive to the DVD set. All other tracks are identical to the CD release.

== Credits ==
Cream

- Jack Bruce – vocals, bass guitar, harmonica
- Eric Clapton – guitar, vocals
- Ginger Baker – drums, cowbells, vocals

Production

- Simon Climie – audio production
- Mick Guzauski – audio mixer
- Alan Douglas – Recording Engineer

== Charts ==
=== Weekly charts ===
Chart (2005–2006)	Peak position
Australian Music DVD (ARIA)	3
Austrian Albums (Ö3 Austria)	51
Austrian Music DVD (Ö3 Austria)	1
Belgian Albums (Ultratop Wallonia)	77
Belgian Music DVD (Ultratop Flanders)	10
Belgian Music DVD (Ultratop Wallonia)	7
Danish Music DVD (Hitlisten)	5
Dutch Albums (Album Top 100)	81
Dutch Music DVD (MegaCharts)	6
Finnish Music DVD (Suomen virallinen lista)	2
French Albums (SNEP)	59
German Albums (Offizielle Top 100)	11
Hungarian Music DVD (MAHASZ)	4
Italian Albums (FIMI)	52
Italian Music DVD (FIMI)	3
Japanese Albums (Oricon)	23
Japanese Music DVD (Oricon)	8
New Zealand Music DVD (Recorded Music NZ)	1
Norwegian Music DVD (VG-lista)	3
Spanish Music DVD (PROMUSICAE)	10
Swedish Music DVD (Sverigetopplistan)	1
UK Albums (OCC)	61
UK Music Videos (OCC)	2
US Billboard 200	59
US Music Videos (Billboard)	1

== Certifications ==
=== Album ===
Region	Certification	Certified units/sales
Germany (BVMI)	Gold	100,000^{^}
^{^} Shipments figures based on certification alone.

=== Video ===
Region	Certification	Certified units/sales
Australia (ARIA)	Platinum	15,000^{^}
France (SNEP)	Gold	10,000^{*}
Germany (BVMI)	Gold	25,000^{^}
New Zealand (RMNZ)	Platinum	5,000^{^}
United Kingdom (BPI)	Platinum	50,000^{*}
United States (RIAA)	5× Platinum	500,000^{^}
^{*} Sales figures based on certification alone.^{^} Shipments figures based on certification alone.
