= SWLABR =

Single by Cream

from the album Disraeli Gears
- A-side: "Sunshine of Your Love"
- Released: November 1967 (album); December 1967 (Note: Although several music writers, including Bobby Owsinski, Riley Haas, Chris Welch and Bob Leszczak, note a release in January 1968 or in that year, the single entered the Cash Box Looking Ahead chart on 30 December 1967. This precludes the possibility of its release the following month.) (US single); September 1968 (UK single)
- Recorded: May 1967
- Studio: Atlantic, New York City
- Genre: Psychedelic rock; hard rock
- Length: 2:30
- Label: Reaction/Polydor (UK); Atco (US)
- Composer: Jack Bruce
- Lyricist: Pete Brown
- Producer: Felix Pappalardi

Cream US singles chronology
"Spoonful" (1967)	"SWLABR" (1967)	"Anyone for Tennis" (1968)

Cream UK singles chronology
"Anyone for Tennis" (1968)	"SWLABR" (1968)	"White Room" (1969)

Audio sample
- 29-second verse segment: file; help

"SWLABR" is a song recorded by the British rock band Cream in 1967. It first appeared on the album Disraeli Gears (1967). Later, the song was the B-side to Cream's "Sunshine of Your Love" single.

== Background ==
The poet Pete Brown wrote the words and Cream's bassist Jack Bruce wrote the music. Bruce sings and plays bass guitar, with Eric Clapton on guitars and Ginger Baker on drums. The title was thought to be an initialism for "She Walks Like a Bearded Rainbow". Bruce later said the W stood for "was" rather than "walks".

According to Brown's obituary in The Times, it was about a jilted lover "defacing pictures of his girlfriend, like painting a moustache on the Mona Lisa".

A live version of "SWLABR" was released on BBC Sessions and the Deluxe Edition of Disraeli Gears, which also includes a four-minute demo version. Several Cream compilation albums include the song, such as Best of Cream, Heavy Cream, Strange Brew: The Very Best of Cream, The Very Best of Cream, Those Were the Days and Gold.

== Sources ==
- Clapton, Eric (2007). Clapton: The Autobiography. New York, United States: Broadway Books. pp. g. 74. ISBN 978-0-385-51851-2.
- Hjort, Christopher (2007). Strange Brew: Eric Clapton & the British Blues Boom, 1965–1970. London, UK: Jawbone Press. pp. g. 29. ISBN 978-1-906002-00-8.
- Ertegün, Ahmet (2006). Classic Albums: Cream – Disraeli Gears (DVD). Eagle Rock Entertainment.
