= Steppin' Out (instrumental) =

Instrumental first recorded by Memphis Slim in 1959

Single by Memphis Slim

from the album At the Gate of the Horn
- B-side: "My Gal Keeps Me Crying"
- Released: 1959
- Recorded: 1959
- Genre: Blues
- Length: 2:07
- Label: Vee-Jay
- Composer(s): L. C. Frazier a.k.a. Memphis Slim

"Steppin' Out" (or sometimes "Stepping Out") is a blues-instrumental composition recorded by American blues musician Memphis Slim in 1959. It was released by Vee-Jay Records as a single and on Slim's At the Gate of the Horn album. Although both releases list L. C. Frazier (another of Memphis Slim/Peter Chatman's pseudonyms) as the writer, Vee-Jay owner James Bracken is often credited on versions by other performers.

Memphis Slim's piano provides the opening harmony part, followed by a tenor sax solo and guitar solo by long-time Slim guitarist Matt Murphy. AllMusic critic Bill Dahl calls Murphy's album contribution as "nothing short of spectacular throughout". A live version recorded in 1986 appears on the Steppin' Out: Live At Ronnie Scott's, London album and video.

== Eric Clapton renditions ==
Eric Clapton recorded several versions of "Steppin' Out" during his early career. In 1966, he recorded the song with three different bands: with Eric Clapton and the Powerhouse, recorded in March for the Elektra Records compilation What's Shakin'; (Note: Credited to Memphis Slim.) with John Mayall & the Bluesbreakers in April for the album Blues Breakers with Eric Clapton; (Note: Credited to L. C. Frazier.) and with Cream in a live performance for broadcast on BBC Radio in November, eventually released on the BBC Sessions compilation in 2003. (Note: Credited to James Bracken.) Cream recorded a second live performance of the song for BBC Radio in January 1968, which was also included on BBC Sessions though it was first released on Clapton's Crossroads box set in 1988.

Clapton's early versions were relatively brief – ranging from under two minutes to little over three – but in live performances with Cream, "Steppin" Out" became an extended improvisational piece often lasting thirteen minutes or more. On occasion, the group's bassist Jack Bruce would drop out of the song after several minutes, leaving Clapton and drummer Ginger Baker to take the song in entirely new, less blues-oriented directions. An example of such can be heard on a live recording from the San Francisco Winterland Ballroom in March 1968, first released on the album Live Cream Volume II in 1972 and later on the Cream box set Those Were the Days in 1997. This version was used in the film Mean Streets (1973). Source IMDB

Jesse Gress, writing for Guitar Player magazine, noted that Ritchie Blackmore's "bluesy head to 'Lazy' (from Deep Purple's Machine Head) fondly paraphrases Slowhand’s [Clapton's] Bluesbreaker-era showcase 'Steppin’ Out,' right down to the same style of third-position swing-sixteenth G blues riffing".
