= Crosscut Saw (song) =

Blues standard popularized by Albert King

"Cross Cut Saw Blues"

Single by Tommy McClennan
- B-side: "You Can't Read My Mind"
- Released: January 2, 1942
- Recorded: September 15, 1941
- Studio: RCA Studio A, Chicago
- Genre: Blues
- Length: 2:44
- Label: Bluebird
- Songwriters: Tommy McClennan (listed on record, see article)

"Crosscut Saw", or "Cross Cut Saw Blues" as it was first called, is a hokum-style song "that must have belonged to the general repertoire of the Delta blues". Mississippi bluesman Tommy McClennan's recording of the song was released in 1941 and has since been interpreted by many blues artists. "Crosscut Saw" became an early R&B chart hit for Albert King, "who made it one of the necessary pieces of modern blues".

== Original song ==
Tommy McClennan's "Cross Cut Saw Blues" is a Delta blues, that follows the hokum style of the time. McClennan, who sings and plays acoustic guitar, and an unknown bass player, recorded the song at the RCA Studio A in Chicago on September 15, 1941. The lyrics make use of double-entendre:

Now I'm a cross cut saw, drag me 'cross yo' log
I'm a cross cut saw, and drag me across yo' log
Babe, I'll cut yo' wood so easy, you can't help say "hot dog"

The song follows the classic twelve-bar blues progression, contrary to Big Bill Broonzy's characterization of McClennan's timing as erratic.

== Tony Hollins version ==
Tony Hollins, a Mississippi bluesman and contemporary of Tommy McClennan, recorded a version of "Cross Cut Saw Blues" with similar lyrics on June 3, 1941, three months before McClennan. The song was not released at the time, but eventually appeared in 1992. In an interview, John Lee Hooker, who knew Tony Hollins, was asked "Well, did Tony Hollins or Tommy McClennan do it first? They both recorded it around the same time". Hooker responded "I think Tommy McClennan did it first". In David "Honeyboy" Edwards' autobiography, The World Don't Owe Me Nothing, Edwards mentioned that he played with both Richard "Hacksaw" Harney and McClennan, and that McClennan got the song "Crosscut Saw" from Harney.

In the earlier days of the blues, it was not unusual for an unrecorded or unpublished song to be in the repertoire of several blues singers. In the folk music tradition, such songs were passed around and developed over an extended period of time without regards to ownership.

== Albert King version ==
"Crosscut Saw"

Single by Albert King

from the album Born Under a Bad Sign
- B-side: "Down Don't Bother Me"
- Released: November 14, 1966
- Recorded: November 2, 1966
- Studio: Stax, Memphis, Tennessee
- Genre: Soul blues
- Length: 2:31
- Label: Stax
- Songwriters: R. G. Ford (listed on record, see article)

Albert King singles chronology
"Oh Pretty Woman" (1966)	"Crosscut Saw" (1966)	"Born Under a Bad Sign" (1967)

In 1966, Albert King recorded his version calling it "Crosscut Saw". The same lyrics as McClennan's "Cross Cut Saw Blues" were used, except for two verses which were replaced by guitar solos. However, King uses a different arrangement based on an Afro-Cuban rhythm pattern, similar to that of his 1962 song "I Get Evil".

Music educator and writer James E. Perone describes the song as having one of the better examples of King's well-known string bending technique:

In addition to this technique, it is worth noting King's tone, which is light and distinctive with a bit of edginess coming from the inclusion of some distortion. In part, it is this combination of lightness, extensive wide string bending, and subtle gritty distortion that helped to give King sound that was easily identifiable.

On November 2, 1966, King recorded the song at the Stax Records studio in Memphis, with the house band, Booker T. & the MG's. Group drummer Al Jackson Jr. has been identified as the one primarily responsible for bringing the song to Stax and King as well as giving it a Latin (Afro-Cuban) beat.

Stax released it as a single, which reached number 34 in the Billboard R&B chart. It is included on King's Born Under a Bad Sign album, which "became one of the most popular and influential blues albums of the late '60s". The song remained in his repertoire throughout his career and several live recordings have been released on albums, such as Thursday Night in San Francisco (1990).

== Songwriter credits ==
Bluebird Records listed "Tommy McClennan" as the songwriter on the 1941 original 78 record, but there is no indication that it was copyrighted. In 1964, R. G. Ford, a Memphis attorney, produced a single of "Cross Cut Saw" by a local group, the Binghamton Blues Boys, on his own East Side Records. The single was only distributed in Memphis and lists "Group" as the author. However, a copyright registration was filed by Ford, and it is his name (and sometimes the group members' names) that appears as the songwriter on Albert King's and most subsequent releases. This has led some commentators to misleadingly refer to "Crosscut Saw" as "the R. G. Ford song" and ignores the song's origins.

== Recognition ==
In 2018, "Cross Cut Saw" was inducted into the Blues Foundation Blues Hall of Fame as a "classic of blues recording". In its announcement, the Foundation notes the song's "complicated evolution", but adds that King's version made it a popular blues standard with blues musicians. French music historian Gérard Herzhaft adds "it is Albert King (Stax 201 on 2 November 1966) who made it one of the necessary pieces of modern blues". Perone notes that King's frequent performances at rock venues also made it a blues rock staple, with recordings by Eric Clapton (Money and Cigarettes, 1983) and Stevie Ray Vaughan (SRV, 2000).
