= Live Cream =

Live album by Cream
- Released: April 1970
- Recorded: May 1967; 7 March 1968; 9 and 10 March 1968
- Venues: Atlantic Studios, New York City; The Fillmore, San Francisco, California; Winterland, San Francisco, California
- Genres: Blues rock, psychedelic rock, hard rock
- Length: 41:45
- Label: Atco
- Producers: Felix Pappalardi, Ahmet Ertegun, Robert Stigwood

Cream chronology
Best of Cream (1969)	Live Cream (1970)	Live Cream Volume II (1972)

Singles from Live Cream
- 1. "Lawdy Mama" Released: July 1970

Professional ratings
Review scores
Source	Rating
AllMusic	4/5 stars
Christgau's Record Guide	C+

Live Cream (also called Live Cream, Volume 1) is a live compilation album by the British rock band Cream, released in 1970. This album comprises four live tracks recorded in 1968 and one studio track "Lawdy Mama" from 1967. The instrumental track for "Lawdy Mama" is the same as heard on "Strange Brew" with a different vocal and guitar solo by Eric Clapton.

Live Cream hit No. 15 on the Billboard 200, No. 4 on the UK Albums Chart, and No. 10 on the Finnish album charts.

== Critical reception ==
In a 1970 review, Rolling Stone magazine called Live Cream "an excellent album" and "well-recorded, controlled, and tense; the timing of the band can capture the listener with an excitement that has nothing to do with nostalgia". Paul Kresh of Stereo Review called it "a strangely uneven set of performances" highlighted by the "studio-made" "Lawdy Mama", which he called "three minutes of truly exciting music." He described the album as "disappointing jazz/rock" with excellent recording and stereo quality, particularly "superb" remixing by Adrian Barber, and felt that the longer tracks "suffer from interludes of aimlessness", but are generally "very good".

In a retrospective review, AllMusic's Bruce Eder gave Live Cream four out of five stars and said that it "could well be their most consistently brilliant album for sheer musicianship", despite only featuring songs from Cream's "least ambitious and most rudimentary album" Fresh Cream (1966). Eder found the group's interplay throughout the jams "fascinating" and asserted that "performances like this single-handedly raised the stakes of musicianship in rock." However, Robert Christgau said, despite side one's "unmistakable and attractive" intensity, he prefers "Clapton's graceful picking on Fresh Cream's 'Sleepy Time Time' over the flat-out distortions here". J. D. Considine, writing in The Rolling Stone Album Guide (2004), gave it two out of five stars and wrote that both Live Cream and its second volume are "muddled leftovers released solely to cash in on the band's enduring popularity." "Ultimate Classic Rock" rated the album in the "Top 100 Live Albums", and said the album found "cool new wrinkles in the old material".

== Track listing ==
Side 1
No.	Title	Recording date and location	Length
1.	"N.S.U." (Jack Bruce)	10 March 1968, Winterland	10:13
2.	"Sleepy Time Time" (Bruce, Janet Godfrey)	9 March 1968, Winterland	6:50
3.	"Lawdy Mama" (Traditional, arr. Eric Clapton)	May 1967, Atlantic Studios	2:46

Side 2
No.	Title	Recording date and location	Length
4.	"Sweet Wine" (Ginger Baker, Godfrey)	10 March 1968, Winterland	15:15
5.	"Rollin' and Tumblin'" (Hambone Willie Newbern)	7 March 1968, The Fillmore	6:42

*Track 3 is moved down to track 5 on most CD releases.

== Personnel ==
Per liner notes

- Jack Bruce – bass, harmonica, vocals
- Eric Clapton – guitar, vocals
- Ginger Baker – drums, vocals
- Felix Pappalardi – producer, except on "Lawdy Mama"
- Ahmet Ertegun – producer on "Lawdy Mama"
- Robert Stigwood – producer on "Lawdy Mama"
- Adrian Barber – recording engineer, re-mix engineer
- Tom Dowd – recording engineer
- Bill Halverson – recording engineer
- Stephen Paley – photography

== Charts ==
Chart (1970)	Peak position
Australian Albums (Kent Music Report)	20
Canada Top Albums/CDs (RPM)	13
Finnish Albums (Suomen Virallinen)	10
French Albums (SNEP)	15
German Albums (Offizielle Top 100)	30
UK Albums (Official Charts)	4
US Billboard 200	15

== Certifications ==
Region	Certification	Certified units/sales
United Kingdom (BPI)	Platinum	300,000^{^}
^{^} Shipments figures based on certification alone.
