= Sunshine of Your Love =

Song first recorded by Cream in 1967

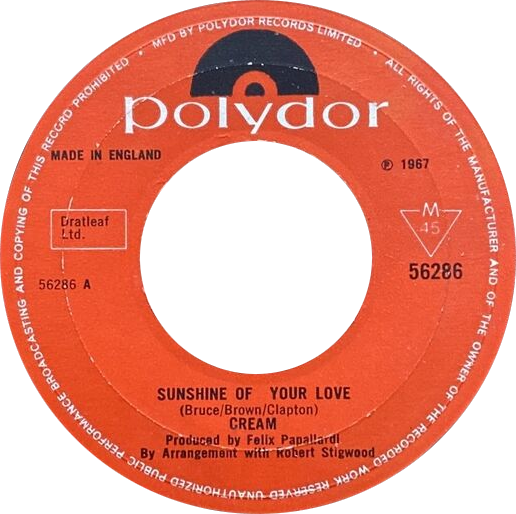
- Large centre variant of the UK single

Single by Cream

from the album Disraeli Gears
- B-side: "SWLABR"
- Released: November 1967 (album); December 1967 (Note: Although several music writers indicate a January 1968 or 1968 release, including Bobby Owsinski, Riley Haas, Chris Welch, and Bob Leszczak, the single entered the Cash Box Looking Ahead chart dated 30 December 1967, precluding the possibility of a January 1968 release.) (US single); September 1968 (UK single)
- Recorded: April–May 1967
- Studio: Atlantic, New York City
- Genre: Psychedelic rock; hard rock; blues rock
- Length: 4:08 (album version); 3:03 (Note: Several Polydor Records singles issued outside of the US show running times close to the album track.) (US single edit)
- Label: Reaction/Polydor (UK); Atco (US)
- Composers: Jack Bruce; Eric Clapton
- Lyricist: Pete Brown
- Producer: Felix Pappalardi

Cream US singles chronology
"Spoonful" (1967)	"Sunshine of Your Love" (1967)	"Anyone for Tennis" (1968)

Cream UK singles chronology
"Anyone for Tennis" (1968)	"Sunshine of Your Love" (1968)	"White Room" (1969)

"Sunshine of Your Love" is a 1967 song by the British rock band Cream. It is the second track on their second album Disraeli Gears and was released as its second single in December 1967. With elements of hard rock and psychedelia, it is one of Cream's best known and most popular songs.

Cream bassist/vocalist Jack Bruce based it on a distinctive bass riff he developed "almost in a fit of desperation" after working unsuccessfully all night on creating a song with his writing partner, lyricist Pete Brown who muttered, "It's getting near dawn and lights close their tired eyes". Guitarist/vocalist Eric Clapton said in a 1988 interview that Bruce created the riff after attending a Jimi Hendrix concert. Clapton later contributed to the song, and drummer Ginger Baker plays a distinctive tom-tom drum rhythm. The song is sung as a duet with Bruce and Clapton trading the lead from line to line.

The song was included on Disraeli Gears, Cream's best-selling album, in November 1967. Atco Records, the group's American label, was initially unsure of the song's potential. After recommendations by other label-affiliated artists, it released an edited single version in December 1967. The song became Cream's first and highest-charting American single and one of the most popular singles of 1968. In September 1968, it became a modest chart hit after being released in the UK.

Cream performed "Sunshine of Your Love" regularly in concert and several live recordings have been issued, including on the Royal Albert Hall London May 2-3-5-6, 2005 reunion album and video. Hendrix performed faster instrumental versions of the song, which he often dedicated to Cream. Several rock journals have placed the song on their greatest song lists, such as Rolling Stone, Q magazine, and VH1. The Rock and Roll Hall of Fame included it on its list of the "500 Songs That Shaped Rock and Roll".

== Composition ==
Cream's "Sunshine of Your Love"
First 20 seconds of intro

In early 1967, Cream were writing and rehearsing songs for a second album. Their December 1966 debut album, Fresh Cream, had been a mix of updated blues numbers and pop-oriented rock songs. Inspired by recent developments in rock music, the group began pursuing a more overtly psychedelic direction. "Sunshine of Your Love" began as a bass phrase or riff developed by Cream bassist Jack Bruce. Bruce tended to write songs with lyricist Pete Brown during the night as that was the only time they had to spare within the band's tour schedule. In 2009, Bruce's biographer, Harry Shapiro, wrote that "after one particularly difficult night" they were struggling to create something, when Bruce played "a riff of syncopated eighth notes all on the offbeat, almost in a fit of desperation", while Brown was staring out the window. Brown then got the line "It's getting near dawn and lights close their tired eyes", which is used in the first verse. Brown, in a 2017 interview with Songfacts, gives a similar account, adding that Bruce was playing his old double bass from his days as a jazz musician.

Cream guitarist Eric Clapton, in a 1988 Rolling Stone magazine interview, told the story that Cream attended a concert on 29 January 1967 by the Jimi Hendrix Experience at the Saville Theatre in London, and that "after the gig he [Bruce] went home and came up with the riff. It was strictly a dedication to Jimi. And then we wrote a song on top of it.

Music writers Covach and Boone describe the riff as blues-derived, using a minor blues pentatonic scale with an added flattened fifth note (or common blues scale). The song follows a blues chord progression (I–IV–I) during the first eight bars. Later, to break up the rhythm, Clapton wrote a refrain which also yielded the song's title. It consists of eight-bar sections using three chords, when the key shifts to the V chord (I = V):

I	♭III–♭VII	I	♭III–♭VII	I	♭III–♭VII	I	I

A bootleg recording from the Ricky-Tick club in London before Cream recorded the song in the studio, shows "Sunshine of Your Love" with a beat common to rock for the period. Cream drummer Ginger Baker compared it to the uptempo "Hey Now, Princess", another Bruce-Brown composition Cream recorded in March. He said that he advised Bruce to slow it down and came up with the distinctive drum pattern which emphasises beats one and three (typical rock drumming favours beats two and four and is known as the backbeat). However, Bruce and recording engineer Tom Dowd dispute Baker's claim, which they say he only made much later. Dowd later explained

Where all the other songs that they [Cream] played were prepared, [but] this one song, they never found a pocket, they were never comfortable ... I said, 'You know, have you ever seen any American Westerns [films that have] the Indian beat, where the downbeat is the beat?' ... And when he [Ginger] started playing it that way, all of the parts came together and right away they were elated.

== Recording ==
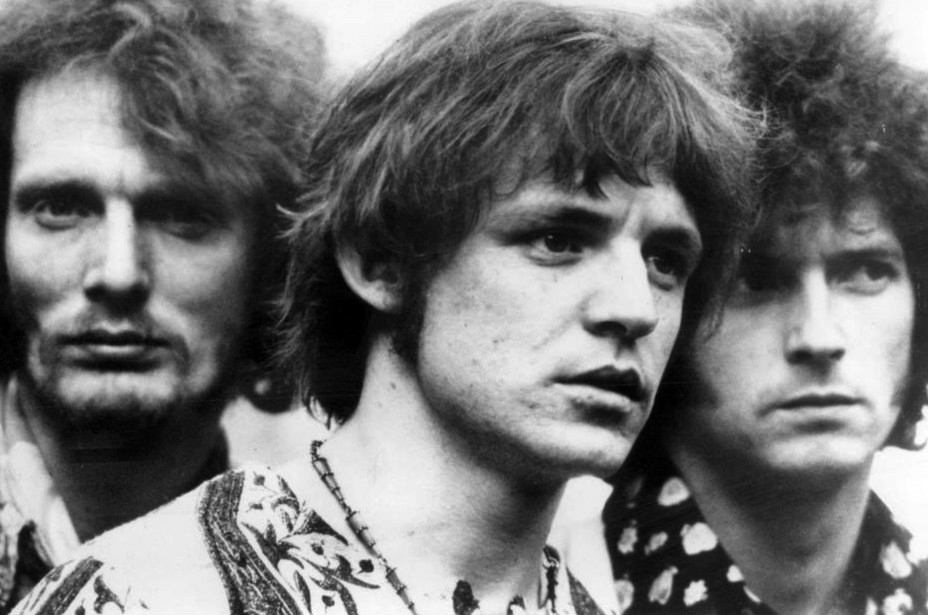
Cream, 1960s

Cream performed their first American concerts in New York City in 1967. Robert Stigwood, the group's manager, booked them for a Murray the K package show at the RKO Manhattan Theatre from 25 March to 2 April 1967. When it was finished, Stigwood arranged for a recording session with Ahmet Ertegun at Atlantic Studios. Bruce and Brown had a number of new songs in various stages of development and entered the studio on 3 April. Initially, Ertegun assigned Dowd to work with the trio. Dowd had worked with many of the biggest jazz and rhythm and blues musicians in the 1950s and 1960s. However, Cream was his first exposure to extreme volume levels. The group arrived at Atlantic with their concert setup of multiple Marshall amplifiers (each 100 watts). (Note: Cream's equipment was painted in psychedelic designs and colours by the Dutch design collective the Fool and was first used at the Murray the K shows. Clapton's 1964 Gibson SG Standard (also called "the Fool"), Bruce's Fender Bass VI, and Baker's drums were painted to match.) Dowd was surprised by the amount of equipment accompanying the trio: "They recorded at ear-shattering level ... Everyone I'd worked with before was using Fender Deluxes [about 20 watts] or Twins [about 80 watts]—six- and seven-piece bands that didn't play as loud as this three piece did."

Ertegun brought in producer Felix Pappalardi, who he believed could work as a go-between with the group and Dowd. They began with "Strange Brew", "Tales of Brave Ulysses", and "Sunshine of Your Love". Ertegun previewed the demos and was unhappy, expecting blues-based material like that to be found on Fresh Cream. Jerry Wexler, Ertegun's Atlantic Records partner, reportedly went as far as to call it "psychedelic hogwash". However, Booker T. Jones (producer and keyboardist of Booker T. & the M.G.'s) and Otis Redding (both whose Stax recordings at the time were distributed by Atco parent Atlantic) gave "Sunshine of Your Love" their wholehearted approval. Differences were smoothed over by the time Cream returned in May 1967 to finish recording the songs for Disraeli Gears. (Note: Pappalardi was so upset with Atlantic's reaction to Cream's early recordings, when he joined Leslie West to form Mountain, he chose to work with another record label.)

With Pappalardi and Dowd, work continued on "Sunshine of Your Love". For his guitar solo, Clapton used a sound known as the "woman tone", which is described as "smooth, dark, singing, sustaining", by author Mitch Gallagher. The actual guitar that Clapton used has been identified as a 1964 Gibson SG, known as "the Fool". (Note: A caption in Robb Lawrence's 2008 book, The Early Years of the Les Paul Legacy 1915–1963 suggests that Clapton used a 1958 Gibson Les Paul Custom based on the tone: "You can hear the distinctively different tone achieved from this [Les Paul Custom] all-mahogany body in comparison to a maple-top Les Paul", although he does not compare it to the SG, which also has an all-mahogany body.) It is one of the best-known examples of the woman tone and quotes the melody from the perennial pop standard "Blue Moon". By using the song's major pentatonic scale, Clapton provides a contrast with the riff's blues scale. A writer for the Rock and Roll Hall of Fame describes this as "creating a balance between the sun and the moon".

Baker plays much of the song on the tom-toms, described as sounding African (Schumacher) and Native American (Shapiro). Covach and Boone note he "concentrates on the lower tom sounds and uses an articulation and sound reminiscent of the jazz drumming in the Woody Herman or Benny Goodman bands".

== Releases and charts ==
"Sunshine of Your Love" was included as the second track on Disraeli Gears, which was released in November 1967 by Reaction Records in the UK and Atco Records in the US. At first, Atco did not see the song as a single ("Strange Brew", backed with "Tales of Brave Ulysses" had been released as a single in June 1967). However, in December 1967, the label issued an edited version of the song as the second single from the album, backed with "SWLABR" (the running time was trimmed from 4:08 to 3:03). It entered Billboard magazine's Hot 100 chart on 13 January 1968, reaching number 36 during its initial 14-week run. The record re-entered the chart on 6 July 1968 and reached number five on 31 August 1968. In the UK, the single was not released until September 1968, after Cream had announced their impending breakup. Polydor Records issued the UK single, which reached number 25 in the charts.

1968 singles charts
Chart	Peak	Ref(s)
Australia Go-Set National Top 40	22	
Canada RPM 100	3	
Dutch Charts	17	
UK Singles Chart	25	
US Billboard Hot 100	5	
US Cash Box Top Singles	6	

1968 year-end charts
Chart	Rank	Ref(s)
Canada RPM Top Singles	21	
US Billboard Top 100 Singles	6	

The Recording Industry Association of America (RIAA) certified the single gold on 26 September 1968, signifying sales in excess of 1,000,000 copies. In the US, it became one of the best selling singles of 1968 and one of the best-selling at the time for the Atlantic group of labels. As one of Cream's most popular songs, several of the group's compilation albums include the full-length studio recording, such as Best of Cream, Heavy Cream, The Very Best of Cream, and the boxed set Those Were the Days. In the United Kingdom, the British Phonographic Industry (BPI) certified the song gold in September 2022, denoting sales and streaming figures exceeding 400,000 units.

== Recognition and influence ==
In 2004, the song ranked number 65 on Rolling Stone magazine's list of the "500 Greatest Songs of All Time". In March 2005, Q magazine placed "Sunshine of Your Love" at number 19 on its list of the "100 Greatest Guitar Tracks Ever!" In 2009, VH1 included it at number 44 on its list of the "Top 100 Hard Rock Songs". The song is on the Rock and Roll Hall of Fame's list of the "500 Songs That Shaped Rock and Roll".

Ertegun later admitted that, while his tastes ran more to Robert Johnson (Clapton had recorded Johnson's "Ramblin' on My Mind" with John Mayall, "Crossroads" with the Powerhouse, and "Four Until Late" with Cream), Cream's and Pappalardi's vision resulted in songs which had a much larger impact on the rock audiences of the time. Covach and Boone identified "Sunshine of Your Love" as foreshadowing future trends in rock:

'Sunshine of Your Love', Cream's best-known song, is a culmination of the British adaptation of blues into rock and also the direct precursor of Led Zeppelin and heavy metal, where this type of blues-based motivic riff and harmonic motions like A–C–G or E–G–A (as in "Whole Lotta Love") serve as the basis for a seemingly endless number of songs.

== Other recordings ==
Several live recordings of "Sunshine of Your Love" have been issued on Cream albums. These include a 24 October 1967 recording by the BBC (BBC Sessions), 9 March 1968 at the Winterland Ballroom (Live Cream Volume II), and 26 November 1968 at the Royal Albert Hall (Cream's Farewell Concert). A recording from Cream's reunion show on 3 May 2005 is included on Royal Albert Hall London May 2-3-5-6, 2005. During their post-Cream careers, Clapton and Bruce recorded several live performances of the song.

A variety of musicians have recorded "Sunshine of Your Love". After Cream announced their breakup, Hendrix often performed it in concert as a tribute to the group, apparently unaware that they had dedicated the song to him. He played it as an instrumental and sometimes as part of a medley. A performance by the Experience on 4 January 1969 is one of the best-known. During the live broadcast of A Happening for Lulu, a music variety show hosted by pop singer Lulu on BBC Television, the Experience suddenly broke with the programme. Hendrix announced, "We'd like to stop playing this rubbish ["Hey Joe"] and dedicate a song to the Cream, regardless of what kind of group they may be in – dedicate this to Eric Clapton, Ginger Baker, and Jack Bruce". As their performance of "Sunshine of Your Love" ran into the time allotted for Lulu's closing number, the show's producer and staff were frantically signalling for the Experience to stop. However, they continued playing and the show ended on a fade. Hendrix later apologised to Lulu, who thought the performance made for a great television moment.

Ella Fitzgerald covered the song during live performances starting in the late 1960s, as captured on 1968's Sunshine of Your Love and Live At Montreux 1969. A version by the Japanese metal band Gastunk appeared at number 83 on the Oricon singles chart on December 12, 1988.

The band Living Colour covered the song for the 1994 film True Lies. The version peaked at number 22 in New Zealand on its debut week ending September 25, 1994.

== Notes ==
Footnotes

Citations

References

- 1968-1997: Oricon Chart Book (30 years anniversary) (in Japanese). Oricon. 1998. ISBN 4871310418.
- Adelt, Ulrich (2007). Black, White and Blue: Racial Politics of Blues Music in the 1960s. ISBN 978-0549341963.
- Belmo; Loveless, Steve (1998). Jimi Hendrix: Experience the Music. Burlington, Ontario: Collector's Guide Publishing. ISBN 1-896522-45-9.
- Birnbaum, Larry (2012). Before Elvis: The Prehistory of Rock 'n' Roll. Lanham, Maryland: Scarecrow Press. ISBN 978-0-8108-8629-2.
- Black, Johnny (1999). Jimi Hendrix: The Ultimate Experience. New York City: Thunder's Mouth Press. ISBN 1-56025-240-5.
- Brewer, Jon (Director) (2005). Cream: Their Fully Authorized Story (DVD documentary). Chatsworth, California: Image Entertainment. OCLC 78626813. ID324715DVD.
- Covach, John; Boone, Graeme M. (1997). Understanding Rock: Essays in Musical Analysis: Essays in Musical Analysis. Oxford, England: Oxford University Press. ISBN 978-0195356625.
- Denisoff, R. Serge (1975). Solid Gold: The Popular Record Industry. Piscataway, New Jersey: Transaction Publishers. ISBN 978-0878555864.
- Gallagher, Mitch (2012). Guitar Tone: Pursuing the Ultimate Guitar Sound. Boston, Massachusetts: Cengage Learning. ISBN 978-1435456211.
- Hoffmann, Frank (1983). The Cash Box Singles Charts, 1950–1981. Lanham, Maryland: The Scarecrow Press. ISBN 978-0810815957.
- Lawrence, Robb (2008). The Early Years of the Les Paul Legacy 1915–1963. Milwaukee, Wisconsin: Hal Leonard. ISBN 978--0-634-04861-6.
- McDermott, John; Kramer, Eddie; Cox, Billy (2009). Ultimate Hendrix. New York City: Backbeat Books. ISBN 978-0-87930-938-1.
- Munro, Doug (2005). Jazz Guitar: Organ Trio Blues. Van Nuys, California: Alfred Music. ISBN 978-0757937279.
- Oxman, J. Craig (December 2011). "Clapton's Fool: History's Greatest Guitar?". Vintage Guitar. Alan Greenwood. ISSN 1067-2605.
- Roberty, Mark (1993). Slowhand: The Complete Life and Times of Eric Clapton. New York City: Crown Trade Paperbacks. ISBN 0-517-88118-7.
- Schumacher, Michael (2003). Crossroads: The Life and Music of Eric Clapton. New York City: Citadel Press. ISBN 978-0806524665.
- Shapiro, Harry; Glebbeek, Cesar (1990). Jimi Hendrix: Electric Gypsy. New York City: St. Martin's Press. ISBN 0-312-05861-6.
- Shapiro, Harry (2009). Jack Bruce: Composing Himself: The Authorised Biography. Jawbone Publishing. ISBN 978-1906002268.
- Thompson, Dave (2012). Cream: How Eric Clapton Took the World by Storm. New York City: Random House. ISBN 978-1448133710.
- Welch, Chris (2000). Cream: The Legendary Sixties Supergroup. Backbeat Books. ISBN 978-1476851501.
- Welch, Chris (2011). Clapton. Voyageur Press. ISBN 978-1610597715.
- Whitburn, Joel (2015). Top Pop Singles 1955–1996. Menomomee Falls, Wisconsin: Record Research. ISBN 978-0-89820-123-9.
