= Hey Lawdy Mama =

Blues song first recorded by Buddy Moss in 1934

"Oh Lordy Mama"

Single by Buddy Moss
- B-side: "Misery Man Blues"
- Released: 1934
- Recorded: New York City, August 8, 1934
- Genre: Blues
- Length: 2:42
- Label: Melotone
- Songwriter(s): Traditional

"Hey Lawdy Mama" (or "Oh Lordy Mama") is a Piedmont blues song recorded by Buddy Moss in 1934. The song became popular among jazz musicians with early recordings by Count Basie and Louis Armstrong. In 1943, a version recorded by Andy Kirk and His Twelve Clouds of Joy, with vocals by June Richmond, was a hit, reaching number four on the Billboard R&B chart.

Variations with elements of "Hey Lawdy Mama" include "Meet Me in the Bottom" and "See See Baby". The song was further popularized with recordings in the 1960s.

== Early songs ==
Buddy Moss' "Oh Lordy Mama" is an uptempo twelve-bar blues with distinct vocal phrasing:

Meet me down at the river, you can bring me my shoes and clothes
Oh Lordy mama, great God almighty
Said meet me down at the river, bring me my shoes and clothes
Says I ain't got so many, but I got so far to go

The song was performed as a solo piece, with Moss providing the vocal and guitar accompaniment. Blues historian Barry Lee Pearson notes: "The Moss version appears to be the earliest one, but the song should be considered traditional."

After Moss' single, similar versions followed: "Oh Lawdy Mama" by Curley Weaver and "Hey Lawdy Mama" by Bumble Bee Slim. Jazz artists, such as Count Basie (1938), Louis Armstrong and his Hot Seven (1941), and Noble Sissle and His Orchestra with Edna Williams (vocal and trumpet) recorded it as "Hey Lawdy Mama". These were released before Billboard magazine or a similar service began tracking such releases, so it is difficult to gauge which of these versions was the most popular, although Bumble Bee Slim's title is the one most commonly used on later versions (and often credited to Slim, also known as Amos Easton). Moss recorded a sequel "Oh Lordy Mama No. 2".

== Meet Me in the Bottom ==
In 1936, Bumble Bee Slim re-recorded "Hey Lawdy Mama" with some new lyrics as "Meet Me in the Bottom".

Meet me in the bottom, bring my boots and shoes
Oh Lawdy mama, great God almighty
Meet me in the bottom, bring my boots and shoes
I've got to leave this town I, got no time to lose

Earlier recorded versions of the song are not identified, although Pink Anderson, who recorded a version of "Meet Me in the Bottom" in 1961 (which closely follows Slim's song), remembered the song "from just after the first World War". Slim's "Meet Me in the Bottom" set the pattern for later versions by other artists, which would include elements of "Hey Lawdy Mama" and "Meet Me in the Bottom" as well as new lyrics.

In 1961, Howlin' Wolf recorded "Down in the Bottom" (also called "Meet Me in the Bottom"), a song credited to Willie Dixon. Although "Down in the Bottom" is different musically and it does not have the "hey Lawdy mama, great God almighty" refrain, Bumble Bee Slim's "Hey Lawdy Mama" has been identified as "the song that Willie Dixon transformed into the classic "Meet Me in the Bottom" for Howlin' Wolf". The opening lines are reminiscent of Slim's "Meet Me in the Bottom":

Well now meet me in the bottom, bring me my running shoes
Well now meet me in the bottom, bring me my running shoes
Well I'll come out the window I, won't have time to lose

== June Richmond renditions ==
In 1942, jazz singer June Richmond recorded the first of several versions of "Hey Lawdy Mama" during her career. Given the big band treatment by bandleader Andy Kirk and His Clouds of Joy, the song was performed as an uptempo swing-blues with a full horn section and vocals by Richmond. The song reached number four in the Billboard R&B chart during a stay of eight weeks in 1943. In 1944 and 1945 she recorded two more versions with Kirk. Richmond appeared in a "soundie" (an early music video) in 1944 singing "Hey Lawdy Mama" backed by Roy Milton's Solid Senders. She recorded another version of the song in 1945 with the Sonny Thompson Sextet. Although Richmond's songs were called "Hey Lawdy Mama", they used the opening verses from "Meet Me in the Bottom".

== Later adaptations ==
In 1961, Freddie King recorded a variation of the song as "See See Baby". Federal Records released it as a single, which reached number 21 in the R&B chart. Junior Wells with Buddy Guy recorded their interpretation of "Hey Lawdy Mama" for the influential 1965 Hoodoo Man Blues album. The song was performed in the style of a Chicago blues, with Wells (vocal and harmonica), Guy (guitar), Jack Myers (bass) and Billy Warren (drums). Wells added new lyrics to the song:

You wanna go out babe, too late at night
Lawdy Mama, hey hey
You wanna go out babe, too late at night
I got a real funny feeling, you don't want to treat your daddy right

In December 1966, British rock band Cream recorded a version of Wells' "Hey Lawdy Mama" for the BBC (released on 2003's BBC Sessions). When preparing material for their second album, Cream recorded another version of Wells' song (released in 1997 as "Version 1" on Those Were the Days). Later they recorded a version using Wells lyrics, but with a different backing arrangement (released in 1970 on Live Cream and as "Version 2" on Those Were the Days). Wells' lyrics and melody were subsequently replaced, creating "Strange Brew", a song which bore little resemblance to their earlier BBC performance or the Junior Wells song.
