= Live Cream Volume II =

1972 live album by Cream

Live album by Cream
- Released: 2 March 1972
- Recorded: 9 March, 10 March and 4 October 1968
- Venues: Winterland, San Francisco; Oakland Coliseum Arena, Oakland
- Genres: Blues rock, psychedelic rock, hard rock
- Length: 41:04
- Labels: Polydor; Atco
- Producer: Felix Pappalardi

Cream chronology
Live Cream (1970)	Live Cream Volume II (1972)	Heavy Cream (1972)

Professional ratings
Review scores
Source	Rating
AllMusic	3.5/5 stars
Christgau's Record Guide	C+
Rolling Stone	(unfavorable)

Live Cream Volume II is the second live album by the British rock band Cream, released in March 1972 by Polydor Records (Atco Records in the US). This album contains six tracks recorded at various performances from 9 March to 4 October 1968.

== Reception ==
Matthew Greenwald of AllMusic stated that Volume 2 had more songs on it than its predecessor, including two songs whose album versions were released as singles. He also commented on how the sound quality was some of the best at the time. He did not like, however, that there were not as many extended jams as there were on the predecessor and that Jack Bruce and Eric Clapton's singing is not good on "White Room" and "Sunshine of Your Love." Greenwald felt that the live version of "Deserted Cities of the Heart" is better than the studio version.

"Steppin' Out" was used in the dramatic climax of Mean Streets (1973) directed by Martin Scorsese.

== Track listing ==
Side 1
No.	Title	Recording date and location	Length
1.	"Deserted Cities of the Heart" (Jack Bruce, Pete Brown)	4 October 1968, Oakland Coliseum Arena	4:32
2.	"White Room" (Bruce, Brown)	4 October 1968, Oakland Coliseum Arena	5:39
3.	"Politician" (Bruce, Brown)	4 October 1968, Oakland Coliseum Arena	5:06
4.	"Tales of Brave Ulysses" (Eric Clapton, Martin Sharp)	10 March 1968, Winterland	4:45

Side 2
No.	Title	Recording date and location	Length
5.	"Sunshine of Your Love" (Clapton, Bruce, Brown)	9 March 1968, Winterland	7:24
6.	"Steppin' Out" (James Bracken, mistitled as "Hideaway" on original LP pressings)	9 March 1968, Winterland	13:38

== Personnel ==
Per liner notes

- Eric Clapton – vocals, guitar
- Jack Bruce – vocals, bass, harmonica
- Ginger Baker – drums
- Felix Pappalardi – producer
- Tom Dowd – recording engineer
- Bill Halverson – recording engineer
- Gene Paul – re-mix engineer
- Kevin Brady – re-mix engineer
- Jim Marshall – cover photography
- Gene Trindl – backliner photography
- Stanisław Zagórski – album design

== Charts ==
Chart (1972)	Peak position
Canada Top Albums/CDs (RPM)	30
French Albums (SNEP)	27
Norwegian Albums (VG-lista)	15
UK Albums (Official Charts)	15
US Billboard 200	27
