= Born Under a Bad Sign (song) =

Blues standard first recorded by Albert King

Single by Albert King

from the album Born Under a Bad Sign
- B-side: "Personal Manager"
- Released: May 24, 1967
- Recorded: May 17, 1967
- Studio: Stax, Memphis, Tennessee
- Genre: Soul blues
- Length: 2:44
- Label: Stax
- Composer: Booker T. Jones
- Lyricist: William Bell

Albert King singles chronology
"Crosscut Saw" (1967)	"Born Under a Bad Sign" (1967)	"Cold Feet" (1968)

"Born Under a Bad Sign" is a blues song recorded by American blues singer and guitarist Albert King in 1967. Called "a timeless staple of the blues", the song also had strong crossover appeal to the rock audience with its synchronous bass and guitar lines and topical astrology reference. "Born Under a Bad Sign" appeared on the R&B chart and became a blues standard.

== Original song ==
The lyrics to "Born Under a Bad Sign" were written by Stax Records rhythm and blues singer William Bell with music by Stax bandleader Booker T. Jones (of Booker T. & the M.G.'s). Bell recalled, "We needed a blues song for Albert King ... I had this idea in the back of my mind that I was gonna do myself. Astrology and all that stuff was pretty big then. I got this idea that [it] might work."

The lyrics describe "hard luck and trouble" tempered by "wine and women", with wordplay in the chorus in the turnaround:

Born under a bad sign, been down since I began to crawl
If it wasn't for bad luck, I wouldn't have no luck at all

Similar verses appear in earlier songs. In 1947, pianist and singer Cousin Joe recorded "Bad Luck Blues" with the Sam Price Trio, which contains the lyrics "If it wasn't for bad luck, I wouldn't have no luck at all". Lightnin' Slim's 1954 swamp blues recording of "Bad Luck Blues" contains the same lines and also includes "Cause bad luck's been followin' po' Lightnin', ever since I began to crawl".

Jones's arrangement for the song does not follow the typical twelve-bar blues I-IV-V progression. Rather, it is dominated by an R&B-style bass/rhythm guitar line, which Bell claimed that he came up with "while fooling around on the guitar". Albert King provided his signature guitar fills around his vocals and solos during the break and outro, with backing by Booker T. & the M.G.'s and the Memphis Horns.

"Born Under a Bad Sign" reached number 49 on Billboard magazine's Top Selling R&B singles chart. It was later included on his first album for Stax, also titled Born Under a Bad Sign. The album's cover depicts images of "bad luck signs" or common superstitions, including a black cat, a Friday the 13th calendar page, skull and crossbones, ace of spades, and snake eyes. Subsequently, the song has appeared on numerous King and various artist collections.

Albert King recorded an updated version of "Born Under a Bad Sign" with producer Allen Toussaint for his 1978 New Orleans Heat album. Live versions are included on Wednesday Night in San Francisco, Chicago 1978, In Session with Stevie Ray Vaughan, The Godfather of the Blues: His Last European Tour 1992, and Talkin' Blues (see Albert King discography for album details).

Co-writers William Bell (1969 Bound to Happen) and Booker T. Jones (1968 Soul Limbo) each recorded the song. Bell re-recorded it for his 2016 album This Is Where I Live.

== Cream version ==
"Born Under a Bad Sign"

Song by Cream

from the album Wheels of Fire
- Released: August 9, 1968
- Recorded: 1968
- Genre: Blues rock
- Length: 3:09
- Label: Polydor (UK); Atco (US)
- Composer: Booker T. Jones
- Lyricist: William Bell
- Producer: Felix Pappalardi

Audio sample
- file; help

British rock group Cream recorded "Born Under a Bad Sign" for their third album, Wheels of Fire (1968). The group's record company, which also distributed Stax records, requested that they record it, according to guitarist Eric Clapton. Cream's rendition follows Albert King's, except for bassist and singer Jack Bruce combining two verses into "I've been down ever since I was ten" and an extended guitar solo by Clapton. Musicologist Robert Palmer described Clapton's playing as "practically Albert King parodies".

Cream recorded a live version for the BBC October 24, 1967, which was released on BBC Sessions in 2003. Another live version was recorded during their reunion performances in 2005 and included on Royal Albert Hall London May 2-3-5-6, 2005.

== Recognition and influence ==
In 1988, Albert King's "Born Under a Bad Sign" was inducted into the Blues Foundation Hall of Fame. Writing for the Foundation, Jim O'Neal called it "one of the signature hits of Albert King that started to win the left-handed string-bender a crossover following in 1967, as he began to break out of the chittlin circuit to invade rock venues like the Fillmore".

King's song is also included in the Rock and Roll Hall of Fame's list of the "500 Songs That Shaped Rock and Roll". Music writer Charles Shaar Murray commented "tunes like 'Crosscut Saw', 'Oh Pretty Woman' and, most of all, 'Born Under a Bad Sign' rapidly became blues standards" and showed King's influence among blues-oriented artists.
