= Hambone Willie Newbern =

American singer

- Born: William Newbern c. 1901; Haywood County, Tennessee, U.S.
- Died: April 15, 1965 (aged 63–64) Memphis, Tennessee, U.S.
- Genres: Country blues
- Occupation: Musician
- Instruments: Guitar; vocals; mandolin
- Years active: 1920s–1940s
- Label: OKeh

William "Hambone Willie" Newbern (c. 1901 – 1947 or April 15, 1965) was an American country blues musician who was active from the 1920s to the 1940s.

== Biography ==
Few details are known of Newbern's life. He is believed to have been born in Haywood County, Tennessee, in or around Brownsville, along Tennessee State Route 19. A guitarist, singer, and mandolin player, Newburn was reported to have played with Yank Rachell and Sleepy John Estes (who provided many biographical details about Newbern) in the 1920s and 1930s. Newburn recorded one of the earliest known versions of the blues standard "Rollin' and Tumblin'", which was waxed in Atlanta, Georgia in 1929. He only recorded six sides in total, all for OKeh Records, which also included "She Could Toodle-Oo" and "Hambone Willie's Dreamy-Eyed Woman's Blues."

Though Newbern was reputedly hot-tempered, reports that he was beaten to death in a prison brawl around 1947 are disputed by researchers Bob Eagle and Eric LeBlanc, who assert that he died at his home in Memphis, Tennessee, in 1965.
