= Janet Godfrey =

British songwriter

Janet Godfrey is a British songwriter, known for being the first wife and occasional writing partner of bassist Jack Bruce.

== Early career ==
Godfrey was the secretary of the fan club for the Graham Bond Organisation, a band that had started in 1963, with Ginger Baker on drums. Jack Bruce was the bassist in the band, and Godfrey teamed with Bruce to write "Baby Make Love to Me" and "Baby Be Good to Me". Godfrey and Bruce were engaged to be married when Marvin Gaye asked Bruce to join him in the US. Bruce declined because of his upcoming marriage. Following this, Bruce and Baker fought on stage, and Bruce left the Bond group. He gigged with John Mayall & the Bluesbreakers for a while and then joined Manfred Mann, a more successful group named after its organist. Bruce made this switch so that he could purchase a home for Godfrey and himself.

== Writing partnership ==
During Bruce's tenure with Cream, Godfrey co-wrote two songs that were included on their debut album Fresh Cream. She wrote "Sleepy Time Time" with her husband, and "Sweet Wine" with drummer Ginger Baker. Of the writing partnership, Bruce later remarked "Ginger and Pete [lyricist Pete Brown] were at my flat trying to work on a song but it wasn't happening. My wife Janet then got with Ginger and they wrote "Sweet Wine" while I started working with Pete."

"Sweet Wine" has since become one of the most widely recognized songs in Cream's repertoire and has remained a fan favourite, as evidenced by its inclusion on numerous compilation albums. Cream also performed both of Godfrey's co-compositions at their 2005 reunion concerts at the Royal Albert Hall.

After the breakup of Cream, Godfrey and Bruce, together with Pete Brown, also co-wrote the songs "Morning Story" for Bruce's 1971 album Harmony Row and "Running Through our Hands" for his 1974 album Out Of The Storm.

== Personal life ==
During their marriage, Godfrey and Jack Bruce had two sons, Jonas (Jo) (1969–1997) and Malcolm (b. 1970), both of whom grew up as members of their father's band. Jonas, primarily a keyboard player, was a core member of Afro Celt Sound System until 8 October 1997 when he died suddenly from an asthma attack. Malcolm is a multi-instrumentalist and singer-songwriter who has performed and recorded with many well-known musicians and bands, including Ginger Baker's son, Kofi.

== See also ==
- Mike Taylor
