= Toad (instrumental) =

1966 instrumental by British rock band Cream

Instrumental by Cream

from the album Fresh Cream
- Released: 9 December 1966
- Recorded: July – October 1966
- Studio: Rayrik & Ryemuse, London
- Genre: Rock
- Length: 5:09
- Label: Reaction (UK); Atco (US)
- Composer: Ginger Baker
- Producer: Robert Stigwood

Audio sample
- Sample from Fresh Cream: file; help

"Toad" is an instrumental by British rock band Cream and was released on their 1966 debut album, Fresh Cream. Composed by drummer Ginger Baker, the piece is a five-minute drum solo (with a brief guitar and bass introduction and ending). Although drum solos are common in jazz, "Toad" is one of the earliest recorded by a rock group.

== Background ==
"Toad" grew out of "Camels and Elephants", a composition Baker had recorded with the Graham Bond Organisation in 1965. When he formed Cream, "Toad" was first recorded for their debut album, Fresh Cream (1966). Baker plays a sequence of drum patterns that are built up, varied, and then dropped, giving way to a new pattern. On the piece, Baker often produced complementary rhythms on the hi-hat, ride cymbal, double-bass drums and tom-toms simultaneously.

== Other recordings ==
An extended sixteen-minute live version (of which 13 minutes is drum solo) appears on Cream's 1968 album Wheels of Fire. A slightly longer version of this recording, with some additional guitar and bass edited into the introduction from another performance, appears on Cream's four-disc compilation album Those Were the Days (1997). "Toad" also featured in Cream's reunion concert in May 2005 at the Royal Albert Hall, and appears on the Royal Albert Hall London May 2-3-5-6, 2005 album.

"Toad" was performed by Ginger Baker's Air Force, and a 13-minute version with drum solos by Baker, Remi Kabaka and Phil Seamen appears on their 1970 live album, Ginger Baker's Air Force, recorded at the Royal Albert Hall in January 1970. "Toad" later evolved into "Toady", which featured on Ginger Baker's Air Force 2 (1970).

== Reception and influence ==
The Cream website, Those Were the Days, described "Toad" as "a coherent drums solo that remains unequalled in Rock Music. It influenced many contemporaries and innumerable budding drummers." "Toad" has been "widely imitated", and "paved the way for a decade of heavy-metal drum solos". Spin magazine gave it the "dubious distinction of introducing the drum solo to the rock LP", and The Drummer: 100 Years of Rhythmic Power and Invention called Baker's drumming on "Toad" "a milestone in drum soloing". In a review of Cream, Life magazine said that "Toad" "features sustained, imaginative drumming that would knock out a Carnegie jazz audience".

In a review of Wheels of Fire in Rolling Stone, Jann S. Wenner described Cream's live performance of "Toad" as "pretty good", and "much better" than the studio version on Fresh Cream. Wenner remarked that Baker's "tendency to be sloppy is not evident, and he gets moving quickly and sustains the tension well".
