= Badge (song) =

- German single picture sleeve

Single by Cream

from the album Goodbye
- B-side: "What a Bringdown"
- Released: 17 March 1969
- Studio: IBC, London
- Genre: Rock; blues rock
- Length: 2:43
- Label: Atco (US); Polydor (UK)
- Songwriters: Eric Clapton, George Harrison
- Producer: Felix Pappalardi

Cream US singles chronology
"Crossroads" (1969)	"Badge" (1969)	"Lawdy Mama" (1970)

Cream UK singles chronology
"White Room" (1969)	"Badge" (1969)

Audio sample
- 29 second vocal segment: file; help

"Badge" is a song by the British rock band Cream, written by Eric Clapton and George Harrison. It first appeared on Cream's final album, Goodbye, released in the UK on 28 February 1969. It was issued as a single in the US on 17 March, and its release followed in the UK on 3 April. "Badge" peaked at number 18 in the UK Singles Chart and number 60 on the US Billboard Hot 100 chart.

== Composition ==
"Badge" was originally an untitled track. During the production transfer for the album Goodbye, the original music sheet was used to produce the liner notes and track listing. The only discernible word on the page was "bridge" (indicating the song's bridge section). Due to Harrison's handwriting, however, Clapton misread it as "badge"—and the song was thus titled soon thereafter.

Harrison remembered the story as follows: "I helped Eric write "Badge" you know. Each of them had to come up with a song for that Goodbye Cream album and Eric didn't have his written. We were working across from each other and I was writing the lyrics down and we came to the middle part so I wrote 'Bridge.' Eric read it upside down and cracked up laughing – 'What's BADGE?' he said. After that, Ringo [Starr] walked in drunk and gave us that line about the swans living in the park."

Common legends or misconceptions are that the name came about because its chord progression was B–A–D–G–E (which is not true) or simply because the notation of a guitar's standard tuning (E–A–D–G–B–E) can be arranged to spell "Badge".

== Reception ==
Cash Box said "More subdued drumming and almost conventional instrumental work show the Cream in a new light, one which should have a tremendous impact on listeners of cleaner-cut rock who may not have been into the blues outings that hit earlier." Billboard called it an "easy beat, driving rocker".

== Writing and publishing credits ==
In the US, Atco Records' initial releases of Goodbye and of "Badge" as a single gave the song's writing credit to Clapton alone, with publishing credit to Robert Stigwood's company Casserole (BMI). Atco later corrected this in 1969 with the release of Best of Cream, which lists both Clapton and Harrison as the song's authors. The UK single of "Badge" released by Polydor Records gave writing credit to both Clapton and Harrison, with publishing credit going to Dratleaf and Harrisongs Ltd. Since the early 1990s the writing credit has been listed as Clapton/Harrison with publishing credit going to E.C. Music, Ltd. and Harrisongs.

== Personnel ==
=== Cream ===
- Eric Clapton – vocals, lead guitar
- Jack Bruce – bass guitar
- Ginger Baker – drums

=== Additional personnel ===
- George Harrison (credited, for contractual reasons, as "L'Angelo Misterioso") – rhythm guitar
- Felix Pappalardi – piano, mellotron

== Charts ==
Chart (1969–1970)	Peak position
Australia (Kent Music Report)	43
Austria (Ö3 Austria Top 40)	18
Canadian Top Singles (RPM)	49
Finnish Albums (Soumen Virallinen)	39
Netherlands (Dutch Tip 40)	14
UK Singles (OCC)	18
US Billboard Hot 100	60
US Cashbox Top Singles	65
West Germany (GfK)	29

== Sources ==
- Miles, Barry (2001). The Beatles Diary Volume 1: The Beatles Years. London: Omnibus Press. ISBN 978-0-7119-8308-3.
