= Cross Road Blues =

1936 blues song by Robert Johnson

- Original 78 record label

Single by Robert Johnson
- Released: May 1937
- Recorded: November 27, 1936
- Studio: Gunter Hotel, San Antonio, Texas
- Genre: Blues
- Length: 2:39
- Label: Vocalion
- Songwriter: Robert Johnson
- Producer: Don Law

"Cross Road Blues" (commonly known as "Crossroads") is a song written by the American blues artist Robert Johnson. He performed it solo with his vocal and acoustic slide guitar in the Delta blues style. The song has become part of the Robert Johnson mythology as referring to the place where he sold his soul to the Devil in exchange for musical genius. This is based largely on folklore of the American South that identifies a crossroads as the site where Faustian bargains can be made, as the lyrics do not contain any references to Satan.

"Cross Road Blues" may have been in Johnson's repertoire since 1932 and, on November 27, 1936, he recorded two takes of the song. One was released in 1937 as a single that was heard mainly in the Mississippi Delta area. The second, which reached a wider audience, was included on King of the Delta Blues Singers, a compilation album of some of Johnson's songs released in 1961 during the American folk music revival.

Over the years, several bluesmen have recorded versions of the song, usually as ensemble pieces with electrified guitars. Elmore James' recordings in 1954 and 1960–1961 have been identified as perhaps the most significant of the earlier renditions. The guitarist Eric Clapton and the British rock group Cream popularized the song as "Crossroads" on their 1968 Wheels of Fire album, and their fiery blues rock interpretation became one of their best-known songs and inspired many cover versions.

Both Johnson's and Cream's recordings of the song have received accolades from various organizations and publications. Both have also led the song to be identified as a blues standard as well as an important piece in the repertoires of blues-inspired rock musicians. Clapton continues to be associated with the song, and has used the name for the Crossroads Centre he founded on Antigua to help people recover from addictions, and the Crossroads Guitar Festivals he organised to raise money for it.

== Recording ==
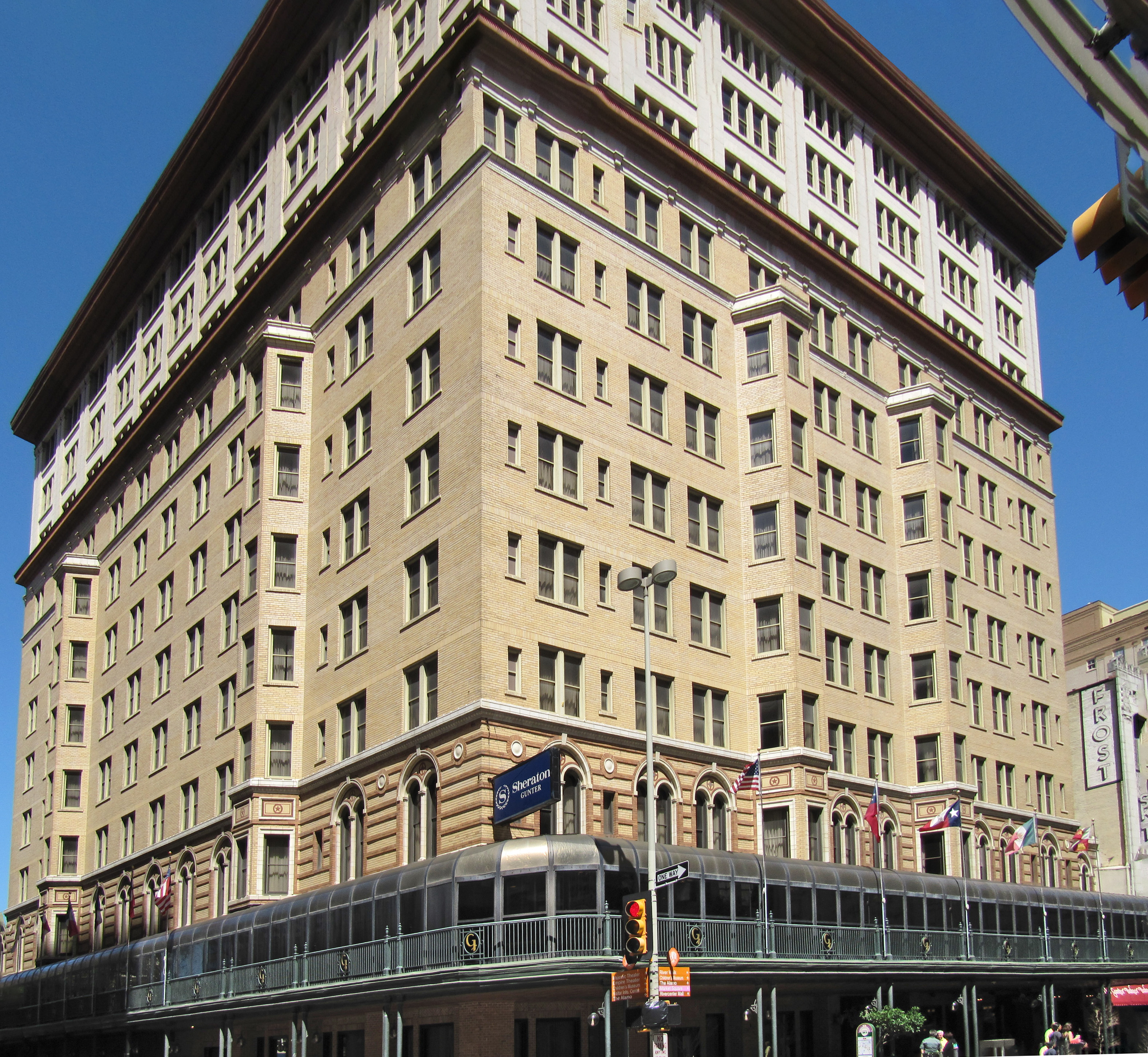
Gunter Hotel, San Antonio, Texas, in 2010

In October 1936, Johnson auditioned for the talent scout H. C. Speir in Jackson, Mississippi. Speir recommended Johnson to Ernie Oertle, then a representative for ARC Records. After a second audition, Oertle arranged for Johnson to travel to San Antonio for a recording session. Johnson recorded 22 songs for ARC over three days from November 23 to 27, 1936. During the first session, he recorded his most commercially appealing songs. They mostly represented his original pieces and reflected current, piano-influenced musical trends. The songs include "Terraplane Blues" (his first single and most popular record) along with "Sweet Home Chicago" and "I Believe I'll Dust My Broom", which became blues standards after others recorded them.

A second and third recording date took place in San Antonio after a two-day break. Johnson reached back into his long-standing repertoire for songs to record. The material reflects the styles of country blues performers Charley Patton and Son House, who influenced Johnson in his youth and are among Johnson's most heartfelt and forceful.

"Cross Road Blues" was recorded on Friday, November 27, 1936, during Johnson's third session in San Antonio. The recordings continued at an improvised studio in Room 414 at the Gunter Hotel. ARC producer Don Law supervised the recording, but it is unknown what input, if any, he had into Johnson's selection of material to record or how to present it. Two somewhat similar takes of the song were recorded.

== Lyrics and interpretation ==
Major landmarks in Johnson's later life are located in the northern part of the Delta region.

A crossroads or an intersection of rural roads is one of the few landmarks in the Mississippi Delta, a flat featureless plain between the Mississippi and Yazoo rivers. It is part of the local iconography and several businesses may use the crossroads' name, such as gas stations, banks, and retail shops. A crossroads is also where cars are more likely to slow down or stop, thus presenting the best opportunity for a hitchhiker. In the simplest reading, Johnson describes his grief at being unable to catch a ride at an intersection before the sun sets. Many see different levels of meaning, and some have attached a supernatural significance to the song.

Both versions of the song open with the protagonist kneeling at a crossroads to ask God's mercy; the second section tells of his failed attempts to hitch a ride. In the third and fourth sections, he expresses apprehension at being stranded as darkness approaches and asks that his friend Willie Brown be advised that "I'm sinkin' down". The first take of the song, which was used for the single, includes a fifth verse that is not included in the second take. In it he laments not having a "sweet woman" in his distress.

According to authors Bruce Conforth and Gayle Dean Wardlow, "many blues fans and even some scholars [have attempted] to link this song to some Satanic or Faustian bargain", as an explanation for how quickly Johnson progressed from being an average musician to an accomplished one. Folklore of the southern United States identifies a crossroads or graveyard as the site of a pact with the Devil, which music writer Elijah Wald identifies as a likely source of the myth. Another source may be Delta bluesman Tommy Johnson (no relation to Robert), who promoted himself as having made a deal with the Devil. Wald writes:

As for "Cross Road Blues", the satanic connection has to be made by first citing the Tommy Johnson story, tracing it through the ancient beliefs in a dark spirit who appears at the meeting of pathways, then jury-rigging it to fit a song that never suggests any such theme.

Although "Cross Road Blues" does not contain any references to Satan or a Faustian bargain, Robert Johnson later recorded two songs that include such themes: "Hellhound on My Trail" tells of trying to stay ahead of the demon hound that is pursuing him and in "Me and the Devil Blues" he sings, "Early this mornin' when you knocked upon my door, and I said 'Hello Satan I believe it's time to go'". These songs contribute to the Faustian myth, but how much Johnson promoted the idea is debated. Music historian Ted Gioia believes that the use of satanic themes and imagery generated much needed publicity for blues musicians who were struggling through the Great Depression.

Blues historian Samuel Charters sees the song as having elements of protest and social commentary. The second verse includes "the sun goin' down now boy, dark gon' catch me here", a reference to the "sundown laws" or curfew during racial segregation in the United States. Johnson, as an African American, may be expressing a real fear of loitering charges or even lynching. Others suggest that the song is about a deeper and more personal loneliness. Writers Barry Lee Pearson and Bill McCulloch feel that the fifth verse in the single version captures the essence of the song: "left alone, abandoned, or mistreated, he stands at the crossroad, looking this way or that for his woman".

== Composition ==
"Cross Road Blues" reflects Johnson's Delta blues roots and may have been in his repertoire since 1932. It is the first recording to show his mastery of his mentor Son House's style, particularly in his slide guitar work. (Note: Johnson recorded two popular Son House songs, "Walkin' Blues" and "Preaching Blues", at the same session after "Cross Road Blues".) Music historian Edward Komara identifies parts of "Straight Alky Blues" by Leroy Carr and Scrapper Blackwell (1929) along with Roosevelt Sykes' subsequent adaptation as "Black River Blues" (1930) as melodic precedents. Johnson infuses their relaxed urban approach with a more forceful rural one. Komara terms Johnson's guitar playing a "blues harp style". It contrasts with Johnson's finger-picking "piano style", which uses a boogie-style accompaniment on the bass strings while incorporating melody and harmony on the higher strings. Harp-style playing employs percussive accents on the bass strings (an imitation of the sharp draw used by harmonica players) and allows Johnson to explore different chord voicings and fills. (Note: According to Son House, Johnson began playing harmonica when he was 15 or 16 years old, and: "[He] could blow harmonica pretty good. Everybody liked it.") Johnson uses this technique for "Terraplane Blues", which shares many elements in common with "Cross Road Blues".

The song's structure differs from a well-defined twelve-bar blues. The verses are not consistent and range from fourteen to fifteen bars in length. The harmonic progression is often implied rather than stated (full IV and V chords are not used). Johnson uses a Spanish or open G tuning with the guitar tuned to the key of B. This facilitates his use of slide guitar, which is as prominent in the song as the vocal. The slide parts function more as an "answer" to the vocal than as accompaniment, the tension underscoring the dark turmoil of the lyrics. Charters characterizes the song's rhythm as ambiguous, imparting both a 4/4 and 8/8 feel. Music writer Dave Headlam elaborates on Johnson's rhythm:

Meter itself is a compositional and performance device which comes in and out of focus in response to the fluid rhythms and changing accents in the lower beats. The irregular groupings extend to smaller beat divisions, with an interplay between triplet 'swing' and duple divisions of the beat ... Johnson's irregular rhythms and variation in support of the metric beat suggest a more personal, idiosyncratic vision.

The two takes of the song are performed at moderate, but somewhat different tempos. Both begin slowly and speed up; the first is about 106 beats per minute (bpm); the second is about 96 bpm. Johnson prepares to go into the fifth section for the slower second take, but the engineer apparently cut him off because of the time limits of ten-inch 78 rpm records. Along with the slower tempo, Johnson sings the verses at a lower pitch, although both takes are in the same key. This allows for greater variation and nuance in the vocal. (Note: Musicologist Robert Palmer describes the vocal as "tense, as if Johnson was forcing wind through a throat constricted by fear", but does not specify which take.) Together with refinements to some guitar parts, the differences serve to help further distinguish the second take from "Terraplane Blues" and give it more of its own character.

== Releases ==
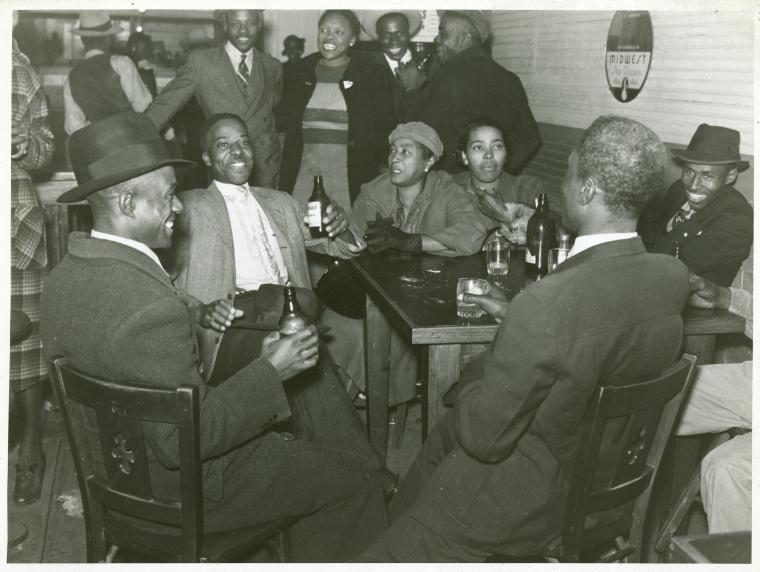
Patrons at a juke joint in Clarksdale, Mississippi, in 1939

ARC and Vocalion Records issued the first take of "Cross Road Blues" in May 1937 on the then standard 78 rpm record. With the flip side "Ramblin' on My Mind", it was the third of eleven singles released during Johnson's lifetime. Vocalion's budget labels Perfect Records and Romeo Records also released the single for sale by dime stores. Although sales figures are not available, the record was "widely heard in the Delta", and Johnson's tunes were found in jukeboxes in the region.

As with most of Johnson's recordings, the single version of "Cross Road Blues" remained out of print after its initial release until The Complete Recordings box set in 1990. The second take was released in 1961, in the later days of the American folk music revival. Producer Frank Driggs substituted it for the original on Johnson's first long-playing record album compilation King of the Delta Blues Singers. This take was also included on the 1990 Complete Recordings (at 2:29, it is 10 seconds shorter than the original 2:39 single version). King of the Delta Blues Singers sold around 12,000 copies; The Complete Recordings sold over one million and received a Grammy Award for Best Historical Album in 1991.

== Elmore James versions ==
American blues singer and guitarist Elmore James, who popularized Robert Johnson's "Dust My Broom", recorded two variations on "Cross Road Blues". Author James Perone describes James' adaptation as "perhaps the most substantial post-Johnson recording [of a Johnson song] before the 1960s". Both titled "Standing at the Crossroads", they feature James' trademark "Dust My Broom" amplified slide-guitar figure and a backing ensemble; the lyrics focus on the lost-love aspect of the song:

Well I was standin' at the crossroad, and my baby not around (2×)
Well I begin to wonder, "Is poor Elmore sinkin' down"

James first recorded the song in August 1954 at Modern Records' new studio in Culver City, California. Maxwell Davis supervised the session and a group of professional studio musicians provided the backup. The song was produced in a newer style that Modern used successfully for B.B. King, and James' slide guitar was placed further back in the mix. Flair Records, another of the Bihari brothers' Modern labels, released the single, backed with "Sunny Land". The song became a regional hit, but did not reach the national charts. Releases associated with Modern included "Standing at the Crossroads" on several James compilation albums, such as Blues After Hours (Crown), The Blues in My Heart – The Rhythm in My Soul (Custom Records), and Original Folk Blues (Kent Records).

In 1959, producer Bobby Robinson signed James to his Fury/Fire/Enjoy group of labels. Along with new material, Robinson had James revisit several of his older songs, including "Standing at the Crossroads". James re-recorded it at Beltone Studios in New York City in late 1960 or early 1961 during one of his last sessions. Studio musicians again provided the backup and the horn section included baritone saxophone by Paul Williams. Bell Records' subsidiary labels released the song after James' death in 1965 – Flashback Records released a single with a reissue of "The Sky Is Crying" and Sphere Sound Records included it on a James compilation album also titled The Sky Is Crying. Both the 1954 and 1960–1961 versions appear on later James compilations, such as Elmore James: The Classic Early Records 1951–1956 (1993, Virgin America/Flair) and Elmore James: King of the Slide Guitar (1992, Capricorn).

== Eric Clapton/Cream interpretation ==
=== Background ===
In early 1966, while still with John Mayall's Bluesbreakers, Eric Clapton adapted the song for a recording session with an ad hoc studio group, dubbed Eric Clapton and the Powerhouse. Elektra Records producer Joe Boyd brought together Steve Winwood on vocals, Clapton on guitar, Jack Bruce on bass guitar, Paul Jones on harmonica, Ben Palmer on piano, and Pete York on drums for the project. Boyd recalled that he and Clapton reviewed potential songs; Clapton wanted to record Albert King's "Crosscut Saw", but Boyd preferred to adapt an older country blues. Their attention turned to Robert Johnson songs and Boyd proposed "Crossroads", (Note: Boyd refers to Johnson's song as "Standing at the Crossroads".) though Clapton favored "Traveling Riverside Blues". (Note: "Traveling Riverside Blues", like the second take of "Cross Road Blues", was first issued in 1961 on Johnson's King of the Delta Blues Singers compilation.) For the recording, Clapton developed an arrangement that drew on both songs.

Biographer Michael Schumacher describes the Powerhouse's performance as slower and more blues-based than Cream's. Elektra released the 2:32 recording, titled "Crossroads", on the compilation album What's Shakin' in June 1966. The song was later included on The Finer Things, a 1995 box set spanning Winwood's career. After the Powerhouse session, Clapton continued playing with Mayall. Author Marc Roberty lists "Crossroads" in a typical set for the Bluesbreakers in the earlier part of 1966.

=== Cream version ===
"Crossroads"
- 1969 Italian picture sleeve

Single by Cream

from the album Wheels of Fire
- B-side: "Passing the Time"
- Released: August 1968
- Recorded: March 10, 1968 (1st show)
- Venue: Winterland Ballroom, San Francisco
- Genre: Hard rock; blues rock
- Length: 4:13
- Label: Polydor (UK); Atco (US)
- Songwriter: Robert Johnson
- Producer: Felix Pappalardi

"Crossroads" became a part of Cream's repertoire when Clapton began performing with Jack Bruce and Ginger Baker in July 1966. Their version features a prominent guitar riff with hard-driving, upbeat instrumental backing and soloing. Clapton previously recorded "Ramblin' on My Mind" with Mayall and "From Four Until Late" with Cream using arrangements that followed Johnson's original songs more closely. He envisioned "Crossroads" as a rock song:

It became, then, a question of finding something that had a riff, a form that could be interpreted, simply, in a band format. In 'Crossroads' there was a very definite riff. He [Johnson] was playing it full-chorded with the slide as well. I just took it on a single string or two strings and embellished it. Out of all of the songs it was the easiest for me to see as a rock and roll vehicle.

Clapton simplifies Johnson's guitar line and sets it to a straight eighth-note or rock rhythm. He and Bruce on bass continuously emphasize the riff throughout the song to give it a strong and regular metric drive combined with Baker's drumming. Johnson's irregular measures are also standardized to typical twelve-bar sections in which the I–IV–V blues progression is clearly stated. Clapton does not adapt Johnson's slide guitar technique or open tuning; instead he follows the electric guitar soloing approach of B.B. King and Albert King. He also employs a Johnson guitar innovation, the duple shuffle pattern or boogie bass line, while singing (Johnson only used it for two bars in "Cross Road Blues"). (Note: Johnson first recorded an adaptation of the boogie bass line for guitar in "Dust My Broom". Later, Elmore James used it for the rhythm guitar parts on "Standing at the Crossroads".)

Clapton also simplifies and standardizes Johnson's vocal lines. Schumacher calls Clapton's vocal on "Crossroads" his best and most assured with Cream. As well as using Johnson's opening and closing lyrics, he twice adds the same section from "Traveling Riverside Blues":

I'm going down to Rosedale, take my rider by my side (2×)
You can still barrelhouse baby, on the riverside

During the instrumental break, Cream takes an improvisational approach characteristic of their later live performances. Bruce's bass lines blend rhythm and harmony, and Baker adds fills and more complex techniques typical of drummers in jazz trios. The momentum is never allowed to dissipate and is constantly reinforced. Cash Box called it "a new winner" for Cream and added "the blazing instrumental break gives this track a luster which will bring home the sales".

=== Clapton's appraisal ===
Clapton's guitar solo is praised by critics and fans, but in interviews, he expressed reservations about his performance. In 1985, he explained:

I really haven't heard that song in so long—and I really don't like it, actually. I think there's something wrong with it. [I]f I hear the solo, and think, "God, I'm on the 2 and I should be on the 1", then I can never really enjoy it. And I think that's what happened with "Crossroads". It is interesting, and everyone can pat themselves on the back that we all got out of it at the same time. But it rankles me a little bit.

In 2004, he repeated his problem with finding the beat and added:

I certainly put that one to bed quickly! I actually have about zero tolerance for most of my old material. Especially "Crossroads". The popularity of that song with Cream has always been mystifying to me. I don't think it's very good ... So, I never really revisit my old stuff. I won't even go there.

=== Recording and releases ===
Cream recorded the song on November 28, 1966, for broadcast on the BBC Guitar Club radio program. At under two minutes in length, it was released in 2003 on BBC Sessions. On March 10, 1968, Cream recorded it again during a concert at the Winterland Ballroom in San Francisco. The song became the opening number on the live half of Cream's Wheels of Fire double album, released in August 1968 by Polydor Records in the UK and Atco Records in the US. After the group's breakup, Atco issued the song as a single in January 1969, which reached number 28 on the US Billboard Hot 100 chart and 17 on Cashbox. Both the original album and single credit the songwriter as Robert Johnson or R. Johnson, although Clapton and Cream extensively reworked the song.

Cream played "Crossroads" during their final concert at the Royal Albert Hall on November 26, 1968. The expanded version of Cream's Farewell Concert film released in 1977 contains the performance. During their 2005 reunion, Cream revisited the song at the Royal Albert Hall and it is included on the Royal Albert Hall London May 2-3-5-6, 2005 album and video. After Cream's breakup in 1968, Clapton continued to perform "Crossroads" in a variety of settings, although in a more relaxed, understated style. Live recordings appear on Live at the Fillmore (with Derek and the Dominos), Crossroads 2: Live in the Seventies, The Secret Policeman's Other Ball (with Jeff Beck).

=== Possible editing on album version ===
Clapton biographer Schumacher writes: "Given the passion of the solo performances on 'Crossroads,' it seems almost miraculous that Cream is able to return to the song itself." Several music writers have explained that Cream's recording for Wheels of Fire was edited from a much longer performance that was typical for the trio – in the notes for Clapton's Crossroads box set, Anthony DeCurtis credits the trimming to engineer Tom Dowd, but critic Stephen Thomas Erlewine attributes the editing to producer Felix Pappalardi, who "cut together the best bits of a winding improvisation to a tight four minutes", to allow the song's drive more continuity.

When asked if the recording had been edited, Clapton replied: "I can't remember ... I wouldn't be at all surprised if we weren't lost at that point in the song, because that used to happen a lot." Bill Levenson, who produced Cream's 1997 box set Those Were the Days, commented:

It's not edited, and I've got an audience tape from the same show which verifies that [it] was a typical performance of the song. I've listened to a lot of tapes, and all of the 'Cross Road Blues (Crossroads)' that I've heard come in at four minutes and change. They never seemed to expand it beyond that.

== Recognition and influence ==
In 1986, Robert Johnson's "Cross Road Blues" was inducted into the Blues Foundation Hall of Fame in the "Classic of Blues Recording – Single or Album Track" category. Writing for the foundation, Jim O'Neal said that "Regardless of mythology and rock 'n' roll renditions, Johnson's record was indeed a powerful one, a song that would stand the test of time on its own." In 1998, it received a Grammy Hall of Fame Award to acknowledge its quality and place in recording history. Rolling Stone magazine ranked "Cross Road Blues" at number 481 on its 2021 list of the "500 Greatest Songs of All Time". In 1995, the Rock and Roll Hall of Fame listed both Johnson and Cream's renditions on its unranked list of the "500 Songs That Shaped Rock and Roll". Rolling Stone placed Cream's version at number three on its 2003 list of "Greatest Guitar Songs of All Time". In June 2026, CBS News included the song in its list of the 250 essential American songs of the past 250 years.

== Other versions and appearances ==
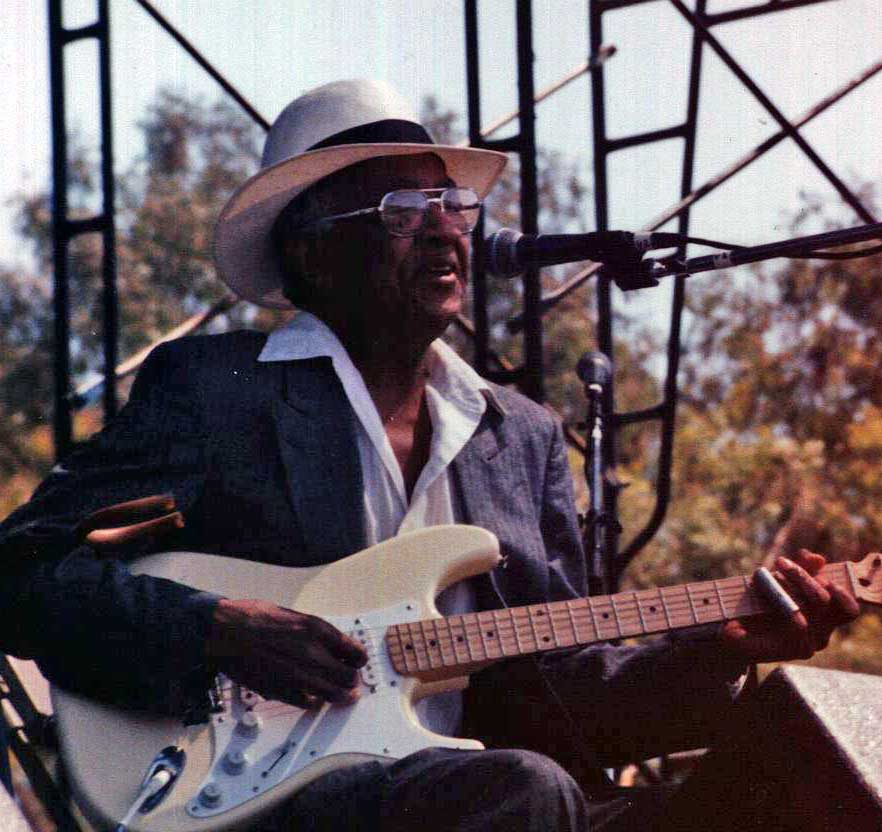
Homesick James performing at the Long Beach Blues Festival in 1994

Several musicians have recorded renditions of "Cross Road Blues", usually using the title "Crossroads". In 1950, Texas Alexander recorded the song for Freedom Records and it became his last single. The choice shows continued interest in Johnson's song well after the original 1937 release. A review in Living Blues includes: "Texas Alexander rushes the beat so determinably on the Delta standby 'Cross Roads', it can't help but make you smile." Alexander provided the vocal, with accompaniment by backing guitarist Leon Benton and pianist Buster Pickens, who are listed as "Benton's Busy Bees".

Homesick James, who recorded and toured with his cousin Elmore James, recorded a rendition on July 23, 1963. Homesick derived his guitar style from Elmore, which music critic Bill Dahl calls "aggressive, sometimes chaotic slide work". Unlike Elmore, Homesick based the lyrics on Johnson's originals. The recording session produced his only single for Chicago-based USA Records, "Crossroads" backed with "My Baby's Sweet". Author Colin Larkin describes it as Homesick's "most famous track ... Its pounding rhythms and heavily amplified bottle-neck made it a landmark in city blues".

Besides being a blues standard, "Crossroads" is popular among blues rock artists. In the band's early days, Lynyrd Skynyrd performed the song in concert as an encore before replacing it with "Free Bird". A live version is included on the 1976 album One More from the Road. The group follows Cream's arrangement, and it recalls their formative Southern rock sound. In 2004, Canadian rock group Rush recorded the song for Feedback, an EP of cover songs. Thom Jurek writes in an AllMusic review: "a romper-stomper wailing performance ... [guitarist Alex] Lifeson leaves Eric what's-his-name in the dust [and bassist Geddy Lee in] his moment of glory in this cut tears the roof off the song". Rush also participated in an all-star jam of "Crossroads" at the 2013 Rock and Roll Hall of Fame induction ceremony. Some of the other jam participants include Chuck D, Darryl DMC, Gary Clark Jr., John Fogerty, Ann Wilson, Nancy Wilson, Dave Grohl, Taylor Hawkins, Tom Morello, and Chris Cornell.

The song has also been used in advertising. Author Greil Marcus identifies two major appearances that used rock-style versions by unidentified performers: in 1997, American brewer Anheuser-Busch used it during the launch of "Cross Roads Beer"; and Toyota's 2000 "Crossroads of American Values" automobile promotions used a version in ads run on the American "Big Three" television networks. According to Marcus, the jovial and celebratory settings portrayed in the advertising are incongruous with Johnson's lyrics. Years after he first recorded the song, Clapton made use of the name for the Crossroads Centre, a drug rehabilitation facility he founded, and for the Crossroads Guitar Festivals to raise money for the facility.
