= Spoonful =

Blues standard first recorded by Howlin' Wolf

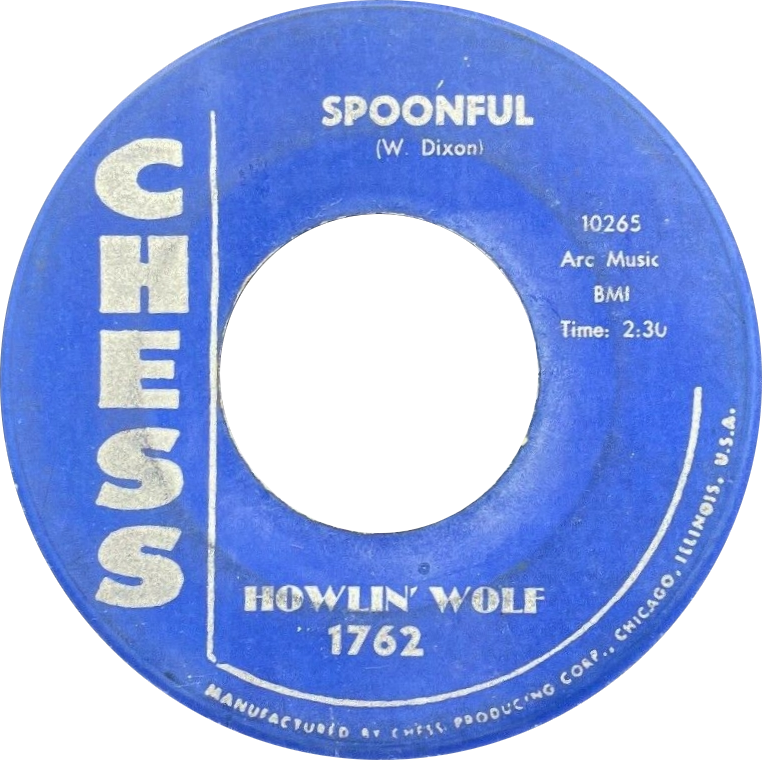

Single by Howlin' Wolf
- B-side: "Howlin' for My Darling"
- Released: June 1960
- Recorded: June 1960
- Studio: Chess, Chicago
- Genre: Blues
- Length: 2:45
- Label: Chess
- Songwriter: Willie Dixon
- Producers: Leonard Chess, Phil Chess, Willie Dixon

Howlin' Wolf singles chronology
"I've Been Abused" (1959)	"Spoonful" (1960)	"Back Door Man" (1961)

"Spoonful" is a blues song written by Willie Dixon and first recorded in 1960 by Howlin' Wolf. Called "a stark and haunting work", it is one of Dixon's best known and most interpreted songs. Etta James and Harvey Fuqua had a pop and R&B record chart hit with their duet cover of "Spoonful" in 1961 and it was popularized in the late 1960s by the British rock group Cream.

== Background and lyrics ==
Dixon's "Spoonful" is loosely based on "A Spoonful Blues", a song recorded in 1929 by Charley Patton. Earlier related songs include "All I Want Is a Spoonful" by Papa Charlie Jackson (1925) and "Cocaine Blues" by Luke Jordan (1927).

The lyrics relate men's sometimes violent search to satisfy their cravings, with "a spoonful" used mostly as a metaphor for pleasures, which have been interpreted as sex, love, and drugs:

It could be a spoonful of coffee
It could be a spoonful of tea
But one little spoon of your precious love
Is good enough for me
Men lies about that spoonful
Some of them cries about that spoonful
Some of them dies about that spoonful
But everybody fight about that spoonful

== Composition and recording ==
"Spoonful" has a one-chord, modal blues structure found in other songs Dixon wrote for Howlin' Wolf, such as "Wang Dang Doodle" and "Back Door Man", and in Wolf's own "Smokestack Lightning". It uses eight-bar vocal sections with twelve-bar choruses and is performed at a medium blues tempo in the key of E. Music critic Bill Janovitz describes it as "brutal, powerful Wolf bellowing in his raspy style. There are few recordings that equal the powerful force of 'Spoonful,' or, for that matter, any other Wolf/Dixon Chess side."

Backing Wolf on vocals are longtime accompanist Hubert Sumlin on guitar, relative newcomer Freddie Robinson on second guitar, and Chess recording veterans Otis Spann on piano, Fred Below on drums, and Dixon on double-bass. It has been suggested that Freddie King contributed the second guitar on "Spoonful", but both Sumlin and Robinson insist it was Robinson. In 1962, the song was included on Wolf's second compilation album for Chess, Howlin' Wolf.

In 1968, Wolf reluctantly re-recorded "Spoonful", along with several of his blues classics in Marshall Chess's attempt at updating Wolf's sound for the burgeoning rock market. Unlike his 1971 The London Howlin' Wolf Sessions (Chess LP-60008), on which he was backed by several rock stars, including Eric Clapton, Steve Winwood, Bill Wyman, and Charlie Watts, here he was backed by relatively unknown studio session players. The resulting album, The Howlin' Wolf Album, with its "comically bombastic" arrangements and instrumentation, was a musical and commercial failure. Wolf offered his assessment in an interview with Rolling Stone magazine: "Man ... that stuff's dogshit".

== Recognition ==
The Rock and Roll Hall of Fame listed Howlin' Wolf's "Spoonful" as one of the "500 Songs that Shaped Rock and Roll". It is ranked number 154 on Rolling Stone magazine's 2021 list of the "500 Greatest Songs of All Time", up from number 221 on its 2004 list.

In 2010, the song was inducted into the Blues Foundation Hall of Fame "Classics of Blues Recordings" category. In a statement by the foundation, it was noted that "Otis Rush has stated that Dixon presented 'Spoonful' to him, but the song didn't suit Rush's tastes and so it ended up with Wolf, and soon thereafter with Etta James". James' recording with Harvey Fuqua as "Etta & Harvey" reached number 12 on Billboard magazine's Hot R&B Sides chart and number 78 on its Hot 100 singles chart. However, Wolf’s original "was the one that inspired so many blues and rock bands in the years to come".

== Cream renditions ==
"Spoonful"
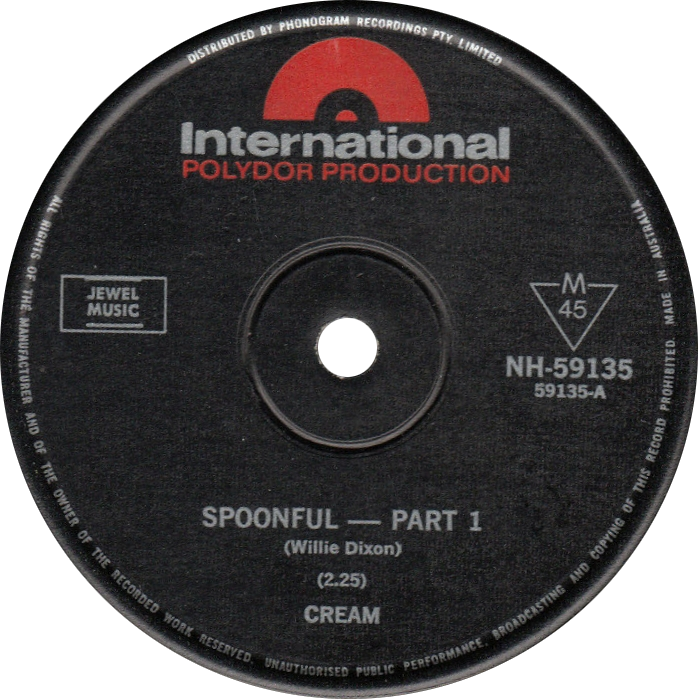
- Side A of the Australian single

Single by Cream

from the album Fresh Cream
- B-side: "Spoonful Part 2"
- Released: December 9, 1966
- Recorded: November 1966
- Studio: Mayfair Sound, London
- Genre: Hard rock; blues rock; psychedelic rock
- Length: 6:30 (album version); 2:25 (part 1); 2:28 (part 2)
- Label: Reaction
- Songwriter: Willie Dixon
- Producer: Robert Stigwood

Audio sample
- Excerpt from Fresh Cream: file; help

The British rock group Cream recorded "Spoonful" for their 1966 UK debut album, Fresh Cream. They were part of a trend in the mid-1960s by rock artists to record a Willie Dixon song for their debut albums.

In an album review for AllMusic, Stephen Thomas Erlewine described Cream's rendition as "where the swirling instrumental interplay, echo, fuzz tones and overwhelming volume constitute true psychedelic music and also points strongly toward the guitar worship of heavy metal."

For the American release of Fresh Cream, "I Feel Free" was substituted for "Spoonful". Atco Records released the song in the US later in 1967 as a two-sided single (with some pressings misspelled as "Spoonfull") but it failed to reach the Billboard Hot 100 record chart. To fit the 6:30 album track on a 45 rpm record, side one fades out at the beginning of the instrumental break (at 2:25) and side two begins just before the third verse (lasting 2:28). The unedited studio version made its US album debut on the Best of Cream compilation in 1969.

Cream frequently played "Spoonful" in concert and the song evolved beyond the blues-rock form of the 1966 recording into a vehicle for extended improvised soloing influenced by the San Francisco music scene of the late 1960s. One such rendering, lasting nearly seventeen minutes, is included on their 1968 album Wheels of Fire. Although the album notes indicate "Live at the Fillmore", "Spoonful" was actually recorded at the Winterland Ballroom.

== Bibliography ==
- Hal Leonard (1995). "Spoonful". The Blues. Milwaukee, Wisconsin: Hal Leonard. ISBN 0-79355-259-1.
- Herzhaft, Gerard (1992). "Spoonful". Encyclopedia of the Blues. Fayetteville, Arkansas: University of Arkansas Press. ISBN 1-55728-252-8.
- LaRose, Joseph A (2006). "Spoonful (A Spoonful Blues)". In Komara, Edward (ed.). Encyclopedia of the Blues. New York City: Routledge. ISBN 978-0-415-92699-7.
- Segrest, James; Hoffman, Mark (2004). Moanin' at Midnight: The Life and Times of Howlin' Wolf. New York City: Pantheon Books. ISBN 0-375-42246-3.
- Welch, Chris (2000). Cream: The Legendary Sixties Supergroup. London: Balafon Books. ISBN 978-1476851501.
- Whitburn, Joel (1988). Top R&B Singles 1942–1988. Menomonee Falls, Wisconsin: Record Research. ISBN 0-89820-068-7.
