= The Very Best of Cream =

Greatest hits album by Cream
- Released: 9 May 1995
- Recorded: 1966–1968
- Genres: Psychedelic rock; blues rock; hard rock
- Length: 70:42
- Label: Polydor
- Producers: Chris Griffin; Bill Levenson; George McManus

Cream chronology
Strange Brew (1983)	The Very Best of Cream (1995)	Those Were the Days (1997)

Professional ratings
Review scores
Source	Rating
AllMusic	5/5 stars

The Very Best of Cream is a 1995 compilation album by the British rock band Cream.

== Track listing ==
No.	Title	Writer(s)	Origin	Length
1.	"Wrapping Paper"	Jack Bruce, Pete Brown	Non-album single (1966)	2:21
2.	"I Feel Free"	Bruce, Brown	Non-album single (1966)	2:54
3.	"N.S.U."	Bruce	Fresh Cream (1966)	2:47
4.	"Sweet Wine"	Ginger Baker, Janet Godfrey	Fresh Cream	3:19
5.	"I'm So Glad"	Skip James	Fresh Cream	4:01
6.	"Spoonful"	Willie Dixon	Fresh Cream	6:30
7.	"Strange Brew"	Eric Clapton, Felix Pappalardi, Gail Collins Pappalardi	Disraeli Gears (1967)	2:48
8.	"Sunshine of Your Love"	Bruce, Brown, Clapton	Disraeli Gears	4:10
9.	"Tales of Brave Ulysses"	Clapton, Martin Sharp	Disraeli Gears	2:46
10.	"SWLABR"	Bruce, Brown	Disraeli Gears	2:31
11.	"We're Going Wrong"	Bruce	Disraeli Gears	3:29
12.	"White Room"	Bruce, Brown	Wheels of Fire (1968)	4:58
13.	"Sitting on Top of the World"	Walter Vinson, Lonnie Chatmon; arr. by Chester Burnett	Wheels of Fire	4:59
14.	"Politician"	Bruce, Brown	Wheels of Fire	4:11
15.	"Those Were the Days"	Baker, Mike Taylor	Wheels of Fire	2:56
16.	"Born Under a Bad Sign"	Booker T. Jones, William Bell	Wheels of Fire	3:09
17.	"Deserted Cities of the Heart"	Bruce, Brown	Wheels of Fire	3:41
18.	"Crossroads"	Robert Johnson, arr. by Clapton	Wheels of Fire	4:14
19.	"Anyone for Tennis"	Clapton, Sharp	The Savage Seven soundtrack (1968)	2:38
20.	"Badge"	Clapton, George Harrison	Goodbye (1969)	2:46

== Personnel ==
- Ginger Baker – drums, percussion, vocals
- Jack Bruce – bass guitar, acoustic guitar, piano, organ, harmonica, cello, vocals
- Eric Clapton – guitar, vocals
- George Harrison - rhythm guitar, track 20

== Charts ==
Chart (1995)	Peak position
New Zealand Recorded Music NZ	19

Chart (2025)	Peak position
Greek Albums (IFPI)	85

== Certifications ==
Region	Certification	Certified units/sales
United Kingdom (BPI)	Gold	100,000^{^}
United States (RIAA)	Gold	500,000^{^}
^{^} Shipments figures based on certification alone.
