= List of songs recorded by Cream =

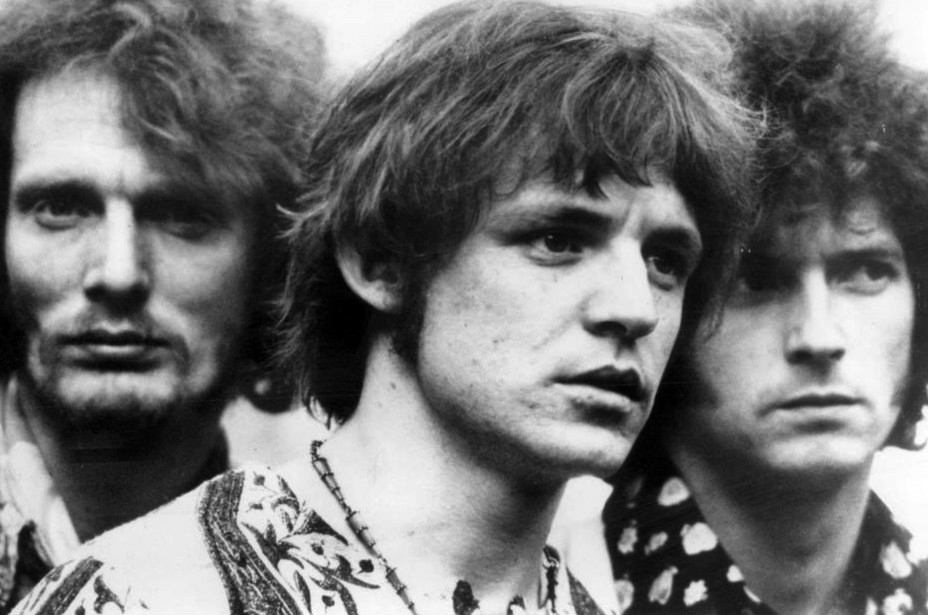
Cream in 1967. L-R: Ginger Baker, Jack Bruce, and Eric Clapton.

A list of songs recorded by British rock supergroup Cream.

== List ==
Key
†	Indicates single release (A and B sides)
‡	Indicates songs not written or co-written by the members of Cream

Name of song, writer(s), original release, and year of release
Song	Writer(s)	Original release	Year	Ref.
"Anyone for Tennis" †	Eric Clapton; Martin Sharp	The Savage Seven (soundtrack)	1968	
"As You Said"	Jack Bruce; Pete Brown	Wheels of Fire	1968	
"Badge" †	Eric Clapton; George Harrison	Goodbye	1969	
"Blue Condition"	Ginger Baker	Disraeli Gears	1967	
"Born Under a Bad Sign"	Booker T. Jones; William Bell ‡	Wheels of Fire	1968	
"Cat's Squirrel" †	Doctor Ross arr. Jack Bruce; Ginger Baker; Eric Clapton	Fresh Cream	1966	
"The Clearout"	Jack Bruce; Pete Brown	Disraeli Gears (Deluxe Edition)	2004	
"The Coffee Song"	Tony Colton; Ray Smith	Fresh Cream (Reissue)	1983	
"Crossroads" (live) †	Robert Johnson arr. Eric Clapton	Wheels of Fire	1968	
"Dance the Night Away"	Jack Bruce; Pete Brown	Disraeli Gears	1967	
"Deserted Cities of the Heart"	Jack Bruce; Pete Brown	Wheels of Fire	1968	
"Doing That Scrapyard Thing"	Jack Bruce; Pete Brown	Goodbye	1969	
"Dreaming"	Jack Bruce	Fresh Cream	1966	
"Falstaff Beer Commercial"	Jack Bruce; Eric Clapton; Ginger Baker	Those Were the Days	1997	
"Four Until Late"	Robert Johnson arr. Eric Clapton	Fresh Cream	1966	
"Hey Now, Princess"	Jack Bruce; Pete Brown	Disraeli Gears (Deluxe Edition)	2004	
"I Feel Free" (Note: "I Feel Free" was released as the first track on the U.S. version of Fresh Cream.) †	Jack Bruce; Pete Brown	Non-album single	1966	
"I'm So Glad" (Note: A live version of "I'm So Glad" was released on Goodbye.)	Skip James ‡	Fresh Cream	1966	
"Lawdy Mama" †	Traditional arr. Eric Clapton	Live Cream	1970	
"Mother's Lament"	Traditional arr. Jack Bruce; Eric Clapton; Ginger Baker	Disraeli Gears	1967	
"N.S.U." †	Jack Bruce	Fresh Cream	1966	
"Outside Woman Blues"	Blind Joe Reynolds arr. Eric Clapton	Disraeli Gears	1967	
"Passing the Time"†	Ginger Baker; Mike Taylor	Wheels of Fire	1968	
"Politician" (Note: A live version of "Politician" was released on Goodbye.)	Jack Bruce; Pete Brown	Wheels of Fire	1968	
"Pressed Rat and Warthog" †	Ginger Baker; Mike Taylor	Wheels of Fire	1968	
"Rollin' and Tumblin'"	Hambone Willie Newbern arr. Muddy Waters ‡	Fresh Cream	1966	
"Sitting on Top of the World" (Note: A live version of "Sitting on Top of the World" was released on Goodbye.)	Walter Vinson; Lonnie Chatmon arr. Chester Burnett ‡	Wheels of Fire	1968	
"Sleepy Time Time"	Jack Bruce; Janet Godfrey	Fresh Cream	1966	
"Spoonful" (Note: A live version of "Spoonful" was released on Wheels of Fire.) †	Willie Dixon ‡	Fresh Cream	1966	
"Strange Brew" †	Eric Clapton; Felix Pappalardi; Gail Collins	Disraeli Gears	1967	
"Steppin' Out"	James Bracken	Live Cream Volume II	1972	
"Stormy Monday"	T-Bone Walker	Royal Albert Hall London May 2-3-5-6, 2005	2005	
"Sunshine of Your Love" †	Jack Bruce; Eric Clapton; Pete Brown	Disraeli Gears	1967	
"SWLABR" †	Jack Bruce; Pete Brown	Disraeli Gears	1967	
"Sweet Wine" †	Ginger Baker; Janet Godfrey	Fresh Cream	1966	
"Take It Back"	Jack Bruce; Pete Brown	Disraeli Gears	1967	
"Tales of Brave Ulysses" †	Eric Clapton; Martin Sharp	Disraeli Gears	1967	
"Those Were the Days" †	Ginger Baker; Mike Taylor	Wheels of Fire	1968	
"Toad" (Note: A live version of "Toad" was released on Wheels of Fire.)	Ginger Baker	Fresh Cream	1966	
"Traintime" (live)	Jack Bruce	Wheels of Fire	1968	
"Weird of Hermiston"	Jack Bruce; Pete Brown	Disraeli Gears (Deluxe Edition)	2004	
"We're Going Wrong"	Jack Bruce	Disraeli Gears	1967	
"What a Bringdown" †	Ginger Baker	Goodbye	1969	
"White Room" †	Jack Bruce; Pete Brown	Wheels of Fire	1968	
"World of Pain"	Felix Pappalardi; Gail Collins ‡	Disraeli Gears	1967	
"Wrapping Paper" †	Jack Bruce; Pete Brown	Non-album single	1966	
"You Make Me Feel"	Jack Bruce; Pete Brown	Those Were the Days	1997	
