= Strange Brew: The Very Best of Cream =

Compilation album by Cream
- Released: 1983
- Recorded: 1966–1968
- Genre: Psychedelic rock; blues rock; hard rock
- Length: 41:24
- Label: RSO/Polydor

Cream chronology
Heavy Cream (1972)	Strange Brew: The Very Best of Cream (1983)	The Very Best of Cream (1995)

Strange Brew: The Very Best of Cream is a 1983 compilation album by the British rock band Cream.

== Critical reception ==
In a contemporary review, Village Voice critic Robert Christgau wrote that the album "must be the fifth or sixth Cream reissue--I stopped counting around 1976--but it's the only one I ever played twice, and I've always wanted an album with 'Anyone for Tennis?' on it." AllMusic critic Rob Bowman later gave it three stars and praised the compilation as being "what the title implies, all the finest tracks from the band's four studio albums. The best was brilliant."

== CD track listing ==
(Note: Tracks 6 and 11 may not appear on some vinyl LP versions or on the cassette - they are on RSD5021 in the UK)

1. "Badge"^{4} (Eric Clapton, George Harrison) – 2:46
2. "Sunshine of Your Love"^{2} (Jack Bruce, Clapton, Pete Brown) – 4:10
3. "Crossroads"^{3} (Robert Johnson, arr. Clapton) – 4:14
4. "White Room"^{3} (Bruce, Brown) – 4:58
5. "Born Under a Bad Sign"^{3} (Booker T. Jones, William Bell) – 3:13
6. "SWLABR"^{2} (Bruce, Brown) – 2:34
7. "Strange Brew"^{2} (Clapton, Felix Pappalardi, Gail Collins Pappalardi) – 2:48
8. "Anyone for Tennis" (Clapton, Martin Sharp) – 2:38
9. "I Feel Free" ^{1} (Bruce, Brown) – 2:54
10. "Politician" ^{3} (Bruce, Brown) – 4:12
11. "Tales of Brave Ulysses"^{2} (Clapton, Sharp) – 2:49
12. "Spoonful"^{1} (Willie Dixon) – 6:30

=== Release notes ===
^1 Tracks 9 & 12 originally released on Fresh Cream (1966)
^2 Tracks 2, 6, 7 & 11 originally released on Disraeli Gears (1967)
^3 Tracks 3, 4, 5 & 10 originally released on Wheels of Fire (1968)
^4 Track 1 originally released on Goodbye (1969)
^5 Track 8 originally released as a single (1968)

== Personnel ==
- Eric Clapton - Lead guitar, rhythm guitar, Lead vocals on tracks 1, 3 & 7–8, co-lead vocals on track 2
- Jack Bruce - Bass guitar, lead vocals on tracks 4–6 & 9–12, co-lead vocals on track 2
- Ginger Baker - Drums, percussion

== Certifications ==
Region	Certification	Certified units/sales
United States (RIAA)	Platinum	1,000,000^{^}
^{^} Shipments figures based on certification alone.
