= Strange Brew (disambiguation) =

Strange Brew is a 1983 film.

Strange Brew may also refer to:

- Strange Brew (soundtrack), the soundtrack album from the 1983 film
- "Strange Brew" (song), a 1967 song by Cream from Disraeli Gears
  - Strange Brew: The Very Best of Cream, a compilation album
- Strange Brew (computer virus)
- Strange Brew (book), a 2009 fantasy short story anthology edited by P.N. Elrod
- Strangebrew, a Philippine reality situational comedy show

== See also ==
- Strange Old Brew, an album by Carpathian Forest
