= Goodbye (Cream album) =

1969 studio album / Live album by Cream

Studio album / Live album by Cream
- Released: 5 February 1969
- Recorded: October–November 1968
- Venues: The Forum, Los Angeles
- Studios: Wally Heider, Los Angeles; IBC, London
- Genre: Hard rock
- Length: 30:30
- Label: Polydor
- Producer: Felix Pappalardi

Cream chronology
Wheels of Fire (1968)	Goodbye (1969)	Best of Cream (1969)

Singles from Goodbye
- 1. "Badge" / "What a Bringdown" Released: March 1969

Goodbye (also called Goodbye Cream) is the fourth and final album by Cream, with three tracks recorded live, and three recorded in the studio. The album was released after Cream disbanded in November 1968.

== Background and recording ==
Just before Cream's third album, Wheels of Fire, was to be released, the group's manager Robert Stigwood announced that the group would disband after a farewell tour and a final concert at the Royal Albert Hall in November. The group started their farewell tour on 4 October 1968 in Oakland, California and 15 days later on 19 October the group performed at The Forum in Los Angeles where the three live recordings on Goodbye were recorded with Felix Pappalardi and engineers Adrian Barber and Bill Halverson.

Shortly after their farewell tour concluded in November (and just prior to the final Royal Albert Hall show on 26 November), Cream recorded three songs over three days at Wally Heider Studios in Los Angeles with producer Felix Pappalardi and engineer Damon Lyon-Shaw, with overdubs at IBC Studios in London a month later. Each of the three songs was penned by a different member of the band. To augment the sound, the songs "Badge" and "Doing That Scrapyard Thing" featured Eric Clapton playing guitar through the Leslie speaker of a Hammond organ, while all three recordings featured keyboard instruments played by either Jack Bruce or Felix Pappalardi. Present at the Wally Heider sessions on 21 November was George Harrison, credited on the album sleeve for contractual reasons as "L'Angelo Misterioso", who contributed rhythm guitar to "Badge", the song he co-wrote with Clapton.

In a 1969 Rolling Stone interview, producer Phil Spector told a possibly apocryphal story about how Atlantic Records head Ahmet Ertegun caused the album to happen: "Like the Cream are breakin' up, and he said, 'like man you have to do a final album for me.' They said, 'Why man, we hate each other,' or somethin' like that. Ahmet said, 'Oh no man, you have to do one more album for me. Jerry Wexler has cancer, and he’s dyin' and he wants to hear one more album from you.' So they go in, make the album and he says, 'Like man, Jerry Wexler isn’t dyin', he’s much better, he’s improved.'”

== Compiling, artwork, and packaging ==
The original plan for Goodbye was to make it a double album, with one disc featuring studio recordings and the other with live performances, like Wheels of Fire. With a lack of quality material on hand, however, the album was only one disc with three live recordings and three studio recordings.

The original LP release of the album was packaged in a gatefold sleeve with art direction handled by Haig Adishian. The outer sleeve featured photography by Roger Phillips with a cover design by Alan Aldridge Ink Studios featuring the group doing a showbiz soft shuffle with top hats and silver silk tails, while the inner sleeve featured an illustration of a cemetery by Roger Hane that had the song titles on tombstones. A compact disc reissue of the album for the Cream Remasters series in 1998 featured an inlay photograph and had the inner-sleeve illustration in the liner notes of the album.

== Release ==
Goodbye was released on 5 February 1969 by Atco Records in the United States, debuting in the Billboard chart on 15 February and a month later in Europe by Polydor Records. It debuted at No. 1 in the United Kingdom on 15 March, staying in that position for four non-consecutive weeks, and peaked at No. 2 in the United States. A single, "Badge", was released from the album a month later and hit No. 18 on the UK charts. Interest in the now-defunct group was so intense at this point that the album's release pushed two of the group's earlier albums, Fresh Cream and Disraeli Gears, to both peak at No. 7 on the UK chart in late February 1969.

== Critical reception ==
Professional ratings
Retrospective reviews
Review scores
Source	Rating
AllMusic	4/5 stars
Chicago Tribune	3/4 stars
Christgau's Consumer Guide	A−
The Rolling Stone Album Guide	3/5 stars

The album was received well by New Musical Express, whose Nick Logan wrote an article-long review discussing each track. He praised the version of "I'm So Glad" for "being as good as they've ever done it and suffice to say the musicianship is stunning", called "Badge" "compelling listening", and pinpointed "What a Bringdown" as Jack Bruce's favorite of the studio tracks. Melody Maker wrote: "no drum solos on this one, but all three are in superb form". Record Mirror was slightly less enthusiastic, calling the album "a worthwhile souvenir though nothing superastonishing to fill us with desperate regrets it's all over", and naming "What a Bringdown" as the best track and "a mild knockout". In the United States, Cashbox penned a short review, which simply stated that "the group has a reservation for the charts with this set, and should claim it in short order".

In a contemporary review for Rolling Stone, music critic Ray Rezos felt Cream deserved to depart with a better album. He wrote that most of the live songs sounded inferior to the original recordings and that the studio tracks were marred by the same flaw as on Wheels of Fire, namely the presence of blues playing on songs whose compositions were not blues in his opinion. Nonetheless, Goodbye was voted the 148th best rock album of all time in Paul Gambaccini's 1978 poll of 50 prominent American and English rock critics, issued as the book Critic's Choice: Top 200 Albums.

In a retrospective review for AllMusic, senior editor Stephen Thomas Erlewine called Goodbye a work of "hard, heavy rock" and "strong moments" rather than cohesiveness, with live music that is generally better than on Wheels of Fire and a side of studio recordings that also found Cream "at something of a peak". Robert Christgau also reacted favourably to the album, citing it as his favourite record from the group. J. D. Considine was less impressed in The Rolling Stone Album Guide (1992), deeming Goodbye an incomplete record with "exquisite studio work" but mediocre live performances.

== Track listing ==
Side one
No.	Title	Writer(s)	Vocal(s)	Length
1.	"I'm So Glad" (Live)	Skip James	Jack Bruce, with Eric Clapton	9:13
2.	"Politician" (Live)	Bruce, Pete Brown	Bruce	6:20

Side two
No.	Title	Writer(s)	Vocal(s)	Length
3.	"Sitting on Top of the World" (Live)	Walter Vinson, Lonnie Chatmon; arr. Chester Burnett	Bruce	5:01
4.	"Badge"	Clapton, George Harrison	Clapton	2:44
5.	"Doing That Scrapyard Thing"	Bruce, Brown	Bruce	3:15
6.	"What a Bringdown"	Ginger Baker	Clapton, with Bruce	3:57

- Sides one and two were combined as tracks 1–6 on CD reissues.

CD bonus track
No.	Title	Writer(s)	Vocal(s)	Length
7.	"Anyone for Tennis" (The Savage Seven theme)	Clapton, Martin Sharp	Clapton	2:37

Notes:

- [1–3] recorded live at The Forum, Los Angeles, 19 October 1968.
- Original pressings of the album (as well as the single) list composer credit on "Badge" to Clapton alone.
- "Anyone for Tennis" was originally released as a non-album single, as well as by Atco on the soundtrack album to the film The Savage Seven (catalogue no. SD 33-245, 1968). The song was subsequently sometimes included on pressings of Wheels of Fire (1968) and later pressings of Goodbye by Polydor.

== Personnel ==
Cream

- Ginger Baker – drums (all tracks), backing vocals (1, 6), percussion (6)
- Jack Bruce – bass guitar (1–5), lead vocals (1–3, 5, 6), piano (5, 6), organ (6)
- Eric Clapton – guitars (all tracks), lead vocals (4, 6) backing vocals (1)

Additional musicians

- L'Angelo Misterioso (George Harrison) – rhythm guitar (4)
- Felix Pappalardi – piano (4), Mellotron (4, 5), bass (6)

Recording

- Engineers – Bill Halverson, Adrian Barber, Damon Lyon-Shaw

== Charts ==
Chart (1969–1970)	Peak position
Australian Albums (Kent Music Report)	6
Canada Top Albums/CDs (RPM)	5
Finnish Albums (Suomen Virallinen)	3
French Albums (SNEP)	3
German Albums (Offizielle Top 100)	9
Norwegian Albums (VG-lista)	7
UK Albums (Official Charts)	1
US Billboard 200	2

== Certifications ==
Region	Certification	Certified units/sales
Australia (ARIA)	Gold	35,000^{^}
United Kingdom (BPI)	Platinum	300,000^{^}
United States (RIAA)	Gold	500,000^{^}
^{^} Shipments figures based on certification alone.
