= Anyone for Tennis =

- Danish single picture sleeve

Single by Cream

from the album The Savage Seven
- B-side: "Pressed Rat and Warthog"
- Released: April 1968
- Recorded: 1967–1968
- Genre: Pop rock
- Length: 2:37
- Label: Atco (US); Polydor (UK)
- Composer: Eric Clapton
- Lyricist: Martin Sharp
- Producer: Felix Pappalardi

Cream US singles chronology
"Sunshine of Your Love" (1967)	"Anyone for Tennis" (1968)	"White Room" (1968)

Cream UK singles chronology
"Strange Brew" (1967)	"Anyone for Tennis" (1968)	"Sunshine of Your Love" (1968)

"Anyone for Tennis (The Savage Seven Theme)" is a song by the British rock band Cream. It was used as the theme song for the 1968 film The Savage Seven.

== History and overview ==
Guitarist Eric Clapton wrote the song for the 1968 film The Savage Seven. It was his second collaboration with lyricist Martin Sharp (their first was "Tales of Brave Ulysses"). According to biographer Michael Schumacher, Clapton was unable to find a melody that suited him, despite expending considerable time.

The song was recorded during the sessions for Cream's third album, Wheels of Fire. However, it was released on The Savage Seven soundtrack album and as a single instead. Backed with "Pressed Rat and Warthog", it reached number 64 on the American Billboard Hot 100 in May 1968 and number 40 on the UK Singles Chart in June 1968.

Billboard described the single as an "unusual piece of folk-rock material with a clever dance arrangement". Record World said that "Cream tell an intriguing fable in these grooves" and that its rhythms "have the sell sound". Cash Box said that "surrealistic pictures are flashed one-after-another in a kaleidoscopic vision of today’s problems" and that the song "has a shock and near-protest appeal".

Cream mimed the song during their promotional appearance on The Smothers Brothers Comedy Hour in May 1968 with a video middle section in which the band carry tennis rackets.

"Anyone for Tennis" is included on several Cream compilation albums, including Superstarshine Vol. 6 / Cream (1972), Strange Brew: The Very Best of Cream (1983), The Very Best of Cream (1995), and the boxed set Those Were the Days (1997). It is also included in the Clapton boxed set Crossroads (1988).

The stereo recording of this song is encoded with the Haeco-CSG system. It has also been included as a bonus track on some CD releases of Wheels of Fire or Goodbye.

== Personnel ==
- Eric Clapton – lead vocal, acoustic guitar, slide guitar
- Jack Bruce – bass guitar, recorder
- Ginger Baker – drums, percussion
- Felix Pappalardi – viola
