= Blue Condition =

Blue Condition may refer to:

- Blue Condition, a 1996 album by Bobby Caldwell
- "Blue Condition", a song by Cream from Disraeli Gears
