= Reaction Records =

British record label

- Parent company: Universal Music Group
- Founded: 1966–1967
- Founder: Robert Stigwood
- Distributor: Polydor Records
- Country of origin: United Kingdom
- Location: London

Reaction was a British independent record label, run by music executive Robert Stigwood in 1966 and 1967. Although Reaction released only three albums, one EP and eighteen singles in its brief existence, its roster included two of the most popular British bands of the time, the Who and Cream.

The label's first single, the Who's "Substitute", was released several times with different B-sides due to the band's legal dispute with their former record producer Shel Talmy. This experience could be seen as one of the deciding factor in the Who's managers Kit Lambert and Chris Stamp deciding to form their own Track Records label, which was also distributed by Polydor Records.

Polydor's involvement with these two labels (as well as Giorgio Gomelsky's Marmalade label) can be seen as a learning process by Polydor who were interested in expanding their base and had little or no experience in the 1960s pop/rock market; at the time, most of their business was done in the easy listening genre, as exemplified by Bert Kaempfert.

Stigwood operated the RSO Records label in the 1970s and 1980s. As with Reaction, RSO was distributed through Polydor Records.

== Discography ==
=== Albums ===
1. Cream: Fresh Cream (Reaction 593 001 mono/594 001 stereo)
2. The Who: A Quick One (Reaction 593 002 mono, no UK stereo)
3. Cream: Disraeli Gears (Reaction 593 003 mono/594 003 stereo)

=== Singles ===
1. The Who: "Substitute" / "Circles" / "Instant Party" (Reaction 591 001) Released 4 March 1966
  - The Who: "Substitute" / The Who Orchestra: "Waltz for a Pig" (Reaction 591 001) Re-released 14 March 1966
2. Paul Dean: "She Can Build A Mountain" / "A Day Gone By" (Reaction 591 002)
3. Oscar: "Club of Lights" / "Waking Up" (Reaction 591 003)
4. The Who: "I'm a Boy" / "In the City" (Reaction 591 004)
5. Birds Birds: "Say Those Magic Words" / "Daddy Daddy" (Reaction 591 005)
6. Oscar: "Join My Gang" / "A Day Gone By" (Reaction 591 006)
7. Cream: "Wrapping Paper" / "Cat's Squirrel" (Reaction 591 007)
8. Lloyd Banks: "We'll Meet Again" / "Look Out Girl" (Reaction 591 008)
9. The Maze: "Hello Stranger" / "Telephone" (Reaction 591 009)
10. The Who: "Happy Jack" / "I've Been Away" (Reaction 591 010)
11. Cream: "I Feel Free" / "N.S.U." (Reaction 591 011)
12. Oscar: "Over The Wall We Go" / "Every Day of My Life" (Reaction 591 012)
13. West Point Supernatural: "Time Will Tell" / "Night Train" (Reaction 591 013) (produced and written by Howard Conder)
14. Billy J. Kramer & the Dakotas: "Chinese Girl" / "Town of Tuxley Toymaker" (Reaction 591 014)
15. Cream: "Strange Brew" / "Tales of Brave Ulysses" (Reaction 591 015)
16. Oscar: "Holiday" / "Give Her All She Wants" (Reaction 591 016)
17. The Sands: "Mrs Gillespie's Refrigerator" / "Listen to the Sky" (Reaction 591 017)
18. Marion Montgomery: "Love Makes Two People Swing" / "Monday Thru Sunday" (Reaction 591 018)

=== EP ===
1. The Who: "Ready Steady Who" (Reaction 592 001)

== See also ==
- Lists of record labels
