= Haeco-CSG =

Analog audio signal processing device

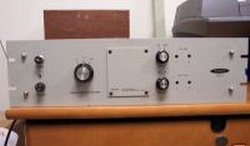
The Haeco-CSG Generator.

The Haeco-CSG or Holzer Audio Engineering-Compatible Stereo Generator system was an electronic analog audio signal processing device developed by Howard Holzer, Chief Engineer at A&M Records in Hollywood, California.

His company, Holzer Audio Engineering, developed the system in the 1960s during the years of transition from mono to stereophonic sound in popular music recording. The process was used primarily from about 1968 until 1970 but still exists on a significant number of recordings made during the time.

== Reasons for using the system ==
The Haeco-CSG process was designed to make stereophonic vinyl LP records compatible with mono playback equipment. These recordings were intended to make the two-channel stereo mix automatically "fold-down" properly to a single mono channel.

The reason for the process is the compatibility issue between stereophonic and monaural recordings: information which is identical on both the left and right channels of a stereophonic mix was considered to be too loud when played back on mono AM and FM radio stations and phonographs. When the left and right channels are summed together, any musical parts that are common to both channels combine to be 6 decibels louder than they are in the same mix when played in stereo (a phenomenon known as "center-channel buildup"). Vocals, solo instruments and bass lines are often mixed equally to both stereo channels — these sounds were contended to be too loud when heard in mono.

In the 1960s and early 1970s it was common practice for recording engineers and producers to create separate mono and stereo mixes of the same record. This was due, in part, to the center channel buildup issue. However, other technical concerns with the differences between stereo and mono record playback also influenced this decision.

The Haeco-CSG system appeared to be an attractive option for record companies and retailers by allowing them to cut costs. Engineers could produce a single mix, record companies could manufacture and distribute one version, and vendors could stock one product.

== How the technology works ==
Haeco-CSG technology works on the basis of phase cancellation. When two waves that are not in phase are mixed, the resulting waveform has an attenuation in accordance to the degree of shift. For example, two waves which are 180 degrees out of phase will entirely cancel out when mixed together whereas two waves which are entirely in phase will double in amplitude. A difference in phase between 180 and 0 degrees results in a partial cancellation, which is the effect Haeco-CSG takes advantage of.

The system electrically rotated the waveform of the right channel by up to 120 degrees to control the buildup of center information during a simple mono downmix. It is not fully known how exactly the circuit accomplished this, however a technician who worked there in 1972–1973, indicates here that the CSG appeared to have split one stereo channel into up to eight single-octave channels followed by eight ganged selectable phase shift networks, controlled via front panel setting. Then a summing amplifier was used for recombination of multiple audio channels into one, followed by a transformer isolated balanced output. The other channel was not encoded and simply passed thru, via another audio transformer. This is how the effect could be encoded without slightly delaying one channel, which would have only provided close enough to 90 degree phase shift within less than an octave and somewhere between 0 and 180 degrees of phase shift is approached at the highest and lowest frequencies in the audio spectrum. A later version, the CSG-2 in R&D in 1973 may have encoded both audio channels, but may have used half the phase shift per channel, and perhaps provided a smoother frequency response.

The most common listing of 90 degrees out of phase corresponds to Haeco's own recommended setting of the +3 dB build up, whereas no build-up would require a 120 degree offset. This setting was most commonly used because of its robustness against polarity reversal of audio interconnects down the chain, which can affect the resulting audio when downmixed to mono. Information that is not common to both channels is entirely unaffected as there is no offset phase wave to cancel with.

The genius of Holzer's design is in how it overcame the limitations of a single phase shift network to shift the entire audio bandwidth. A phase shift network is composed of a resistive and a reactive circuit element, either a capacitor or an inductor. Relative values of the two will cause a phase shift (i.e. 90 degrees) at some given frequency that is easily calculated. But the amount of phase shift varies with the frequencies above or below that pass through it, relative to the intended phase shift. So a fairly consistent phase delay over the entire audio bandwidth was achieved by using multiple phase delay networks with audio bands restricted to the allowable deviation in desired phase shift versus permissible flatness of the audio response.

== Negative effects ==
Generally speaking, Haeco-CSG has a degrading effect on the performance of both stereo and mono sounds processed through the system. The effect can vary substantially from one recording to another depending on the characteristics of the original unprocessed sound. The system "blurs" the focus of lead vocals or other sounds mixed to the center of a stereo recording. This is the main reason why Haeco-CSG was usually applied to recordings with bass positioned in one channel only. Bass frequencies are usually centered on modern recordings. The effect today would cause a significant loss of low frequency information, making the resulting sound somewhat "tinny". Negative effects of the system can be heard on any stereo speaker system, but makes headphone listening particularly un-natural sounding. This is because the lead vocalist or performer's audio waveform would be attempting to partially cancel itself inside the listener's head, confusing the brain's audio positioning sense.

Due to complicated interaction of phase and frequency it is difficult to predict exactly how the reduction from two channels to one will affect the sound of a particular instrument. Therefore mono sound from a true mono mix is preferable to the use of the Haeco-CSG stereo to mono process.

== Known recordings ==
Atlantic Records took out a full page advertisement in the 6 April 1968 issue of Billboard magazine to promote its adoption of the technique, calling it "CSG Stereo". Many A&M Records LP releases during the period including popular titles by Sérgio Mendes and Herb Alpert were released with this audio process starting in September 1968. Other record labels soon followed suit, and an estimated 10% of all stereophonic albums released during the late 1960s and early 1970s employed the system. Other labels known to have used the system include Warner Bros. Records and Reprise Records.

One of the biggest selling albums using the process is The Association's Greatest Hits, released in 1968. This recording has sold more than 2 million copies in the United States. The process was also used on the 1968 Frank Sinatra album Cycles as well as on most of the studio recordings on Wheels of Fire by Cream. Early 1968 copies of Neil Young's self-titled debut album also used the system.

== Use of Haeco-CSG in promotional recordings for radio ==
The original intention of using Haeco-CSG on commercial LP releases was rather short lived, however, use of the process continued well into the mid-1970s on promotional records sent to radio stations. Many commercial FM Rock stations did not transition from mono to stereo broadcasting until the mid to late 1970s. AM Pop music stations continued to broadcast in mono, as AM stereo broadcasting was not introduced until 1982 and was never widely adopted.

Many promotional singles and some commercial singles from the Warner/Reprise/Atlantic label group from this era had "CSG Mono Process" or "CSG Process" printed on the labels. Artists included Frank Sinatra, Gordon Lightfoot, James Taylor, Seals and Crofts. Warner subsidiary labels such as Atlantic issued a series of mono radio station promotional LPs by progressive rock artists circa 1968–1971. The series included titles by Led Zeppelin, Yes, King Crimson and many others. In 1979, the Warner distributed label Sire Records issued a promotional single of "Pop Muzik" by M which contains both short and long versions in CSG processed stereo. This may be the latest known recording to utilize the CSG stereo process.

== Modern remastering without Haeco-CSG ==
Haeco-CSG can be applied during the mastering stage, near the end of the record production chain. In such cases, the earliest stereo master tapes exist without processing. Therefore, the process can be avoided entirely when such recordings are remastered for compact disc. Remastering without the effect requires a well informed audio engineer who makes an effort to locate the correct master tapes.

However the Haeco-CSG processing was often applied at the master tape mix session. This, in effect, makes it a permanent part of the stereo recording. But, the process can still be reversed through modern digital reprocessing. Unfortunately, many compact discs of these processed albums still are encoded with the system, causing negative effects even on modern digital playback systems.

== Digital reprocessing ==
Haeco-CSG processing can be reversed through digital audio workstation software by digitally re-rotating phase of the right channel back by the correct number of degrees.

The phase module of iZotope RX allows a user to fully adjust the phase of each stereo audio channel independently.

Adobe Audition is able to remove the effect using the Graphic Panner tool (the Automatic Phase Correction tool is unable to accurately do this) by manually selecting the "Phase −90 degrees" preset. The "Auto Center Phase" and "Learn Phase" features will also work, but are not recommended. There are sometimes slight offsets caused by various mixing effects and, to a lesser extent, tape-head misalignment; studio reverb or naturally decaying reverb is a prime example. As a waveform decays in a large room, it naturally changes phase. In Auto Center phase, this is (generally) shown as the upper frequencies making a drastic change. Tape head misalignment (azimuth) also will cause a phase change in upper frequencies. One should be aware of this when attempting to remove Haeco processing and not use auto-phase options. Azimuth alignment adjustment tools can however be used AFTER Haeco has been removed.

The "Stereo Tool" plug-in used with Winamp is able to reverse Haeco-CSG. Enable the "Stereo Image Processing" option and adjust the "Angle" setting right to 90 degrees. By adjusting the Winamp plug-in settings under the "Preferences" tab to "out_disk" it is possible to capture the reprocessed audio to a new file.

Orban Optimod-PCn (x86 Native) Professional Broadcast Audio Processing Software can be used to effectively remove all HAECO-CSG as well as any other phase/azimuth errors, all automatically. There is no need for any time or angle settings. The result is always perfect stereo that is perfect mono downmix capable. A description and examples are available at the StreamIndex website.

One can also use a simple channel mixer found in most workstations to do a simple correction. By having each channel contain 75% of itself and 25% of the other channel, the "blended" result will be mostly in phase. This, however, will cause the stereo separation to be somewhat diminished.

== Use today ==
While the system is no longer in use anywhere today, the basic idea of shifting the phase to create a mono downmix can be applied today if one has a reason to do so. The "encoding" process is similar to the "decoding" process in the application of a 90 or 120 degree phase shift followed by averaging the channels together in a channel mixer.
