= Strange Brew (computer virus) =

Computer virus that infects Java code

Strange Brew was the first computer virus that infects java code—applets and other programs written in java—rather than exploiting the Java virtual machine runtime interpreter. It was written in 1998 by a university student as a demonstration of self-replicating java code as a potential security flaw. Standard security features of the java runtime interpreter prevent its spread in most circumstances.
