= Wheels of Fire =

1968 studio/live album by Cream

Studio album / Live album by Cream
- Released: 14 June 1968
- Recorded: 1967–1968
- Venues: Winterland & The Fillmore, San Francisco, California
- Studios: IBC, London; Atlantic, New York City
- Genres: Psychedelic rock; blues rock; hard rock; proto-metal
- Length: 35:53 (studio album) 44:23 (live album) 80:16 (total)
- Label: Polydor
- Producer: Felix Pappalardi

Cream chronology
Disraeli Gears (1967)	Wheels of Fire (1968)	Goodbye (1969)

Singles from Wheels of Fire
- 1. "White Room" Released: November 1968; 2. "Crossroads" Released: January 1969

Wheels of Fire is the third album by the British rock band Cream. It was released in the US on 14 June 1968 as a two-disc vinyl LP, with one disc recorded in the studio and the other recorded live. It was released in the UK in the same format on 9 August.

== Background and recording ==
Cream's third album was planned to be a double album which would include several live performances. Unlike Disraeli Gears, which had been recorded in a matter of days, the Wheels of Fire sessions took place in small bursts over nearly a year. The recording engineers on disc one were Tom Dowd and Adrian Barber. The live performances on disc two were recorded by Bill Halverson and mixed by Adrian Barber.

Sessions with producer Felix Pappalardi began in July and August 1967 at IBC Studios in London, months before the release of Disraeli Gears, with the basic tracks for "White Room", "Sitting on Top of the World", and "Born Under a Bad Sign" put to tape. Jack Bruce expressed the band's preference for working with Pappalardi and Dowd, as well as the new unhurried atmosphere contrasted with the first two albums: "We're all temperamental but Tom...and Felix manage to get rid of that temperament...We spend a long time in the studio, so we don't have to rush. We usually talk for hours before we record anything, then we play, think and add sounds". Recordings continued with short sessions at Atlantic Studios in September and October 1967 where overdubs were added to the aforementioned three songs along with basic tracks for "Pressed Rat and Warthog" and the non-LP single "Anyone for Tennis". After more overdubs in mid-December, further work took place at Atlantic from 13–22 February 1968, during a break from the band's heavy tour schedule, where basic tracks for "Politician", "Passing The Time", "Deserted Cities of the Heart" and "As You Said" were laid down along with further work on the previous tracks.

The following month, Pappalardi ordered that a mobile recording studio in Los Angeles be shipped to The Fillmore Auditorium and Winterland Ballroom in San Francisco. Six shows were recorded at both venues from 7–10 March by Pappalardi and recording engineer Bill Halverson, with extra performances not included on Wheels of Fire ending up on Live Cream and Live Cream Volume II. Further recordings and mixing for the album were completed at Atlantic Studios in June 1968, nearly a year after they had started, with the completion of "White Room", "Passing the Time", "Deserted Cities of the Heart", "As You Said" and the recording of a final number, "Those Were the Days". By this point, recording at the end of two exhausting back-to-back tours of America, tensions between the band members had become considerably strained. The album was then rushed to shops in the US by mid-June.

== Composition and music ==
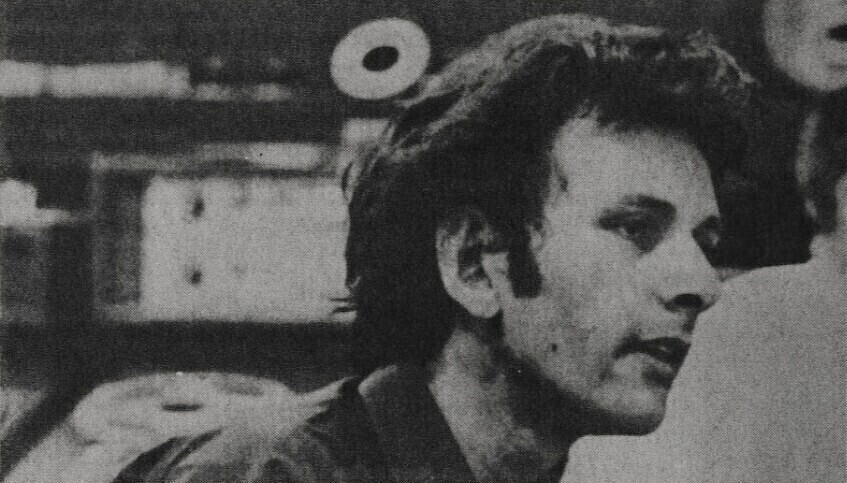
Felix Pappalardi served as producer

The band's drummer Ginger Baker co-wrote three songs for the album ("Passing the Time", "Pressed Rat and Warthog", and "Those Were the Days") with jazz pianist Mike Taylor. Baker later admitted that "Pressed Rat and Warthog" was an inside joke, based on the bawdy imagery referred to by its title. Bassist Jack Bruce co-wrote four songs with poet Pete Brown including "White Room", "As You Said" (the only Cream recording which does not feature Clapton), "Politician" and "Deserted Cities of the Heart". In an interview, Pete Brown revealed that the lyrics to "White Room" were condensed from an eight page poem he had written when he moved into a new white-walled apartment room with bare furnishings, where he gave up drinking and drugs. "Politician" came together quickly for a January 1968 BBC radio session when, needing one more track, Bruce came up with a riff which Brown, who was present in the studio, thought was perfect to match with lines of a poem he'd written several years earlier; the song was finished and recorded for broadcast that day. Guitarist Eric Clapton contributed to the album by choosing two blues songs to cover, the standard "Sitting on Top of the World" and Booker T. Jones's "Born Under a Bad Sign", which had been the title track to the recent Albert King album of the same name. Production on the studio disc was more elaborate than that for the first two albums, with the addition of exotic instrumentation including glockenspiel, calliope, cello, trumpet, bells, viola and tonette creating a psychedelic feel, with the three blues numbers featuring the group's basic three piece sound.

For the second disc, Felix Pappalardi chose "Traintime" because it featured Jack Bruce's singing and harmonica playing, "Toad" because it featured Ginger Baker's lengthy drum solo, while "Spoonful" and "Crossroads" were used to showcase Eric Clapton's guitar work. All four songs had been a part of their set list since the band's beginnings in 1966, as shown by several early BBC performances.

== Artwork ==
The artwork for the album was by Martin Sharp, who had co-written "Tales of Brave Ulysses" and "Anyone for Tennis" with Clapton and also done the artwork for Disraeli Gears. The front and back covers consisted of a silver-grey psychedelic drawing, with the inner gatefold consisting of a similar drawing, only in Day-Glo colors of orange, green, pink and yellow. The photography was by Jim Marshall.

== Release and promotion ==
Wheels of Fire was released by Atco in the US on June 14, 1968, with a UK release on Polydor following on August 9. It was an instant blockbuster success, charting at No. 3 in the United Kingdom and No. 1 in the United States, Canada and Australia, becoming the world's first platinum-selling double album. The album's release, however, was accompanied by an announcement on July 10 that the band was going to split up by the end of the year, citing a loss of direction.

The album was also released as two single LPs, Wheels of Fire (In the Studio) and Wheels of Fire (Live at the Fillmore), with similar cover art. In the UK the studio album art was black print on aluminum foil, while the live album art was a negative image of the studio cover; In the Studio charted as high as No. 7 in that country, although it possibly took from sales of the double disc set. In Japan, the studio album art was black on gold foil, while the live album art was black on aluminium foil. In Australia, both covers were laminated copies of the Japanese releases.

== Reception and legacy ==
Professional ratings
Review scores
Source	Rating
AllMusic	4/5 stars
About.com	5/5 stars
Chicago Tribune	4/4 stars
The Daily Vault	A
The Encyclopedia of Popular Music	4/5 stars
MusicHound Rock	5/5 stars
Musician	(Positive)

In England, critical reception to the album was highly positive. In a lengthy review, Chris Welch of Melody Maker began by noting "If Cream have been disappointing on record in the past ... their long awaited double album is sufficient to restore the faith of the most errant disciple", praising the group's taste and restraint on tracks like "As You Said" and enthusing that the live disc was "electrifying". Record Mirror said the record should be subtitled "to remind us of all that was best about the Cream live and in the studio", concluding that as the band wouldn't be around for much longer, it was a must for everyone's collection. Disc & Music Echo labelled it "Best LP of the month" and "a fitting--at times superb--memorial to Britain's best live group" with the best material they had put on record. In the United States, Jann Wenner at Rolling Stone gave a poor review to the studio disc, singling out "As You Said" and "Politician" as the only worthwhile tracks and stating of "White Room" that it is a too-close duplication of "Tales of Brave Ulysses" with a "Sonny Bono-ish production job that adds little"; however, he praised the live disc, stating of "Spoonful" that "this is the kind of thing that people who have seen Cream perform walk away raving about and it’s good to at last have it on a record". In a more positive review, Cashbox predicted that the album would see heavy sales action.

Retrospectively, the album has been cited a classic of the era. Writing in The Virgin Encyclopedia of Popular Music, Colin Larkin said the live disc captured the group at their "inventive and exploratory best". In a four-star review, Stephen Thomas Erlewine at AllMusic notes that the album "is indeed filled with Cream's very best work, since it captures the fury and invention (and indulgence) of the band at its peak on the stage and in the studio, but...doesn't quite add up to something greater than the sum of its parts. But taken alone, those individual parts are often quite tremendous". David Bowling at The Daily Vault gushed that the album has "withstood the test of time, remains one of the essential rock albums and should be required listening."

In May 2012, Rolling Stone magazine ranked it at number 205 on its list of the 500 greatest albums of all time, noting it is "incontrovertible proof of Eric Clapton's interpretive mastery". It was voted number 757 in the third edition of Colin Larkin's All Time Top 1000 Albums (2000).

== Track listing ==
=== 1968 original release ===
Disc one: In the Studio

Side one
No.	Title	Writer(s)	Length
1.	"White Room"	Jack Bruce, Pete Brown (Note: Some songs on the studio album were processed with the Haeco-CSG system. Also processed was "Anyone for Tennis", which was released as a single. Haeco-CSG was intended to make stereo recordings that were compatible with mono playback but has the unfortunate side effect of "blurring" the phantom centre channel. On Wheels of Fire this side effect is particularly noticeable during Eric Clapton's guitar solo on "Deserted Cities of the Heart".)	4:58
2.	"Sitting on Top of the World"	Walter Vinson, Lonnie Chatmon; arr. Chester Burnett	4:58
3.	"Passing the Time"	Ginger Baker, Mike Taylor (Note: Some pressings of this album contain a longer version of "Passing the Time". The "long version" is extended by one minute and 13 seconds, and was included on the gold CD issued by DCC Compact Classics. An "extended version" included on Those Were the Days is an additional seven seconds longer.)	4:32
4.	"As You Said"	Bruce, Brown	4:20
Total length:			18:48

Side two
No.	Title	Writer(s)	Length
1.	"Pressed Rat and Warthog"	Baker, Taylor	3:13
2.	"Politician"	Bruce, Brown	4:12
3.	"Those Were the Days"	Baker, Taylor	2:53
4.	"Born Under a Bad Sign"	Booker T. Jones, William Bell	3:09
5.	"Deserted Cities of the Heart"	Bruce, Brown (Note: Original pressings of Wheels of Fire incorrectly listed the running time of "Deserted Cities of the Heart" at 4:36. This incorrect time was still present on 1980s pressings in the UK.)	3:38
Total length:			17:05

Disc two: Live at the Fillmore

Side three
No.	Title	Writer(s)	Recording date	Length
1.	"Crossroads"	Robert Johnson, arr. Clapton	10 March 1968 at Winterland, San Francisco, CA (1st show)	4:18
2.	"Spoonful"	Willie Dixon	10 March 1968 at Winterland, San Francisco, CA (1st show)	16:47
Total length:				21:05

Side four
No.	Title	Writer(s)	Recording date	Length
1.	"Traintime"	Bruce (Note: Original album pressings list "John Group" as the author of "Traintime". The "John Group" appellation dates back to Jack Bruce's tenure with the Graham Bond Organisation (with whom Bruce originally recorded the song in 1965) and was used by that band to ensure that members other than Bond received songwriting royalties. The song is based on a vintage blues by Peter Chatman.)	8 March 1968 at Winterland, San Francisco, CA (1st show)	7:02
2.	"Toad"	Baker	7 March 1968 at The Fillmore, San Francisco, CA (2nd show)	16:16
Total length:				23:18

Performers on disc one are "the Cream quartet" consisting of Clapton, Baker, and Bruce together with Felix Pappalardi, who plays many different instruments and is also credited with production.

While the second disc is labelled Live at the Fillmore, only "Toad" was recorded there. The other three tracks were recorded at the Winterland Ballroom.

=== 2014 Japan Polydor 2-disc Limited Edition bonus tracks ===
In 2014, Japan Polydor released a two-disc limited edition SHM-CD (UICY-76024/5) with four bonus tracks: two on the studio disc, and two on the live one.

Disc one

10. "Anyone for Tennis" (Eric Clapton, Martin Sharp)
11. "Falstaff Beer Commercial" (Clapton, Ginger Baker, Jack Bruce)

Disc two

5. "Sunshine of Your Love" (Clapton, Bruce, Pete Brown)
6. "N.S.U." (Bruce)

=== 2026 Super Deluxe Edition ===
In 2026 Polydor re-released the album in several formats including a comprehensive five-CD box set which contained various remastered and remixed tracks, rare and unreleased tracks, and additional performances from the same source as the four original live tracks. Notably, the remastering digitally removed the Haeco-CSG process which was used on the original album; this was to make the two-channel stereo compatible with monophonic reproduction equipment but at the expense of reducing musical clarity.

== Personnel ==
Per liner notes.

- Ginger Baker – drums, percussion, bells, glockenspiel, timpani, vocals, spoken word on "Pressed Rat and Warthog"
- Jack Bruce – lead vocals, bass guitar, cello, harmonica, calliope, acoustic guitar, recorder
- Eric Clapton – guitar, vocals
- Felix Pappalardi – producer, viola, bells, organ, trumpet, tonette
- Tom Dowd – recording engineer on disc one
- Adrian Barber – recording engineer on disc one, re-mix engineer on disc two
- Bill Halverson – recording engineer on disc two
- Joseph M. Palmaccio – digital remastering
- Martin Sharp – artwork
- Jim Marshall – photography
- Stanislaw Zagórski – album design

=== Personnel and information for the studio sessions ===
"White Room" Recorded at IBC Studios, July and August 1967; Atlantic Studios, September, 9–10 October, and 12–15 December 1967; 13–22 February and 12–13 June 1968

- Eric Clapton – lead and rhythm guitars
- Jack Bruce – vocals, bass
- Ginger Baker – drums, timpani
- Felix Pappalardi – viola

"Sitting on Top of the World" Recorded at IBC Studios, July 1967; Atlantic Studios, September 1967

- Eric Clapton – lead and rhythm guitars
- Jack Bruce – vocals, bass
- Ginger Baker – drums

"Born Under a Bad Sign" Recorded at IBC Studios, July and August 1967; Atlantic Studios, September 1967

- Eric Clapton – lead and rhythm guitars
- Jack Bruce – vocals, bass
- Ginger Baker – drums, tambourine

"Pressed Rat and Warthog" Recorded at Atlantic Studios, 9–10 October and 12–15 December 1967; 13–22 February 1968

- Eric Clapton – lead and rhythm guitars
- Jack Bruce – basses, recorder
- Ginger Baker – spoken-word vocals, drums
- Felix Pappalardi – trumpet, tonette

"Anyone for Tennis" Recorded at Atlantic Studios, 9–10 October and 12–15 December 1967; 13–22 February 1968

- Eric Clapton – vocals, acoustic guitar, slide guitar
- Jack Bruce – bass, recorder
- Ginger Baker – congas
- Felix Pappalardi – viola

"Passing the Time" Recorded at Atlantic Studios, 13–22 February and 12–13 June 1968

- Eric Clapton – backing vocals, lead and rhythm guitars
- Jack Bruce – lead vocals, bass, cello, calliope
- Ginger Baker – backing vocals, drums, glockenspiel
- Felix Pappalardi – organ pedals

"As You Said" Recorded at Atlantic Studios, 13–22 February and 12–13 June 1968

- Jack Bruce – vocals, acoustic guitars, cello
- Ginger Baker – hi-hat

"Politician" Recorded at Atlantic Studios, 13–22 February and 12–13 June 1968

- Eric Clapton – lead and rhythm guitars
- Jack Bruce – vocals, bass
- Ginger Baker – drums

"Deserted Cities of the Heart" Recorded at Atlantic Studios, 13–22 February and 12–13 June 1968

- Eric Clapton – lead and rhythm guitar
- Jack Bruce – vocals, bass, cello, acoustic guitar
- Ginger Baker – drums, tambourine
- Felix Pappalardi – viola

"Those Were the Days" Recorded at Atlantic Studios, 12–13 June 1968

- Eric Clapton – backing vocals, lead and rhythm guitars
- Jack Bruce – lead vocals, bass
- Ginger Baker – drums, marimba, tubular bells
- Felix Pappalardi – Swiss hand bells

== Charts ==
Chart (1968–1969)	Peak position
Australian Albums (Kent Music Report)	1
Canada Top Albums/CDs (RPM)	1
Finnish Albums (Suomen virallinen lista)	3
French Albums (SNEP)	2
German Albums (Offizielle Top 100)	15
Norwegian Albums (VG-lista)	16
UK Albums (Official Charts)	3
US Billboard 200	1
US Top R&B Albums (Billboard)	11

Chart (2013)	Peak position
Croatian International Albums (HDU)	25

Chart (2026)	Peak position
Austrian Albums (Ö3 Austria)	40
Belgian Albums (Ultratop Flanders)	60
Belgian Albums (Ultratop Wallonia)	171
German Rock & Metal Albums (Offizielle Top 100)	8
Norwegian Physical Albums (IFPI Norge)	8
Scottish Albums (Official Charts)	9
Swedish Physical Albums (Sverigetopplistan)	12
Swiss Albums (Schweizer Hitparade)	27

== Certifications ==
Region	Certification	Certified units/sales
Australia (ARIA)	Platinum	70,000^{^}
United Kingdom (BPI) 1998 release	Silver	60,000^{‡}
United States (RIAA)	Platinum	1,000,000^{^}
^{^} Shipments figures based on certification alone.^{‡} Sales+streaming figures based on certification alone.
