= The Savage Seven =

1968 film by Richard Rush

- Theatrical release poster
- Directed by: Richard Rush
- Screenplay by: Michael Fisher
- Story by: Rosalind Ross
- Produced by: Dick Clark
- Starring: Robert Walker Jr. Larry Bishop; Joanna Frank; John Garwood; Adam Roarke
- Cinematography: László Kovács
- Edited by: Renn Reynolds
- Music by: Mike Curb; Jerry Styner
- Production company: Dick Clark Productions
- Distributed by: American International Pictures
- Release date: May 5, 1968
- Running time: 94 minutes
- Country: United States
- Language: English
- Box office: $2,100,000 (US/ Canada rentals)

The Savage Seven is a 1968 outlaw biker exploitation film directed by Richard Rush, who had directed the previous year's Hells Angels on Wheels. Rush agreed to direct The Savage Seven in exchange for the opportunity to make the psychedelic film Psych-Out.

Penny Marshall appears in one of her earliest screen roles.

== Plot ==
Kisum, the leader of a motorcycle gang, is in love with waitress Marcia Little Hawk. Her brother Johnnie Little Hawk, the leader of a group of Indians, is upset about the romance. The bikers and Indians join forces but a scheme by crooked businessmen causes them to become adversaries.

== Cast ==
- Robert Walker Jr. as Johnnie Little Hawk
- Joanna Frank as Marcia Little Hawk
- John Garwood as "Stud"
- Larry Bishop as "Joint"
- Adam Roarke as Kisum
- Max Julien as Grey Wolf
- Richard Anders as "Bull"
- Duane Eddy as Eddie
- Billy "Green" Bush as Seely
- Gary Kent as Lansford
- Penny Marshall as Tina

== Reception ==
In a contemporary review for The New York Times, critic Richard F. Shepard wrote: "The movie is one continuous uproar of unmuffled motors and head-cracking and emphasized cruelty from one and to another. It is colorful and technically competent but completely cheap in its primitive, uninquiring, kick'-em-in-the-groin sensationalism, too serious to be lusty and too one-note to be interesting."

Several critics consider the film to be a biker film adaptation of Akira Kurosawa's 1954 classic Seven Samurai. In an interview, Rush said that Quentin Tarantino liked this film the best among his line of work.

== Soundtrack ==
The film's soundtrack album was released 1968 on Atco Records as 33-245 (mono) and SD-33-245 (stereo).

| No. | Title | Writer(s) | Performer | Length |
|---|---|---|---|---|
| 1. | "Anyone for Tennis (Theme from The Savage Seven)" | Eric Clapton, Martin Sharp | Cream | 2:39 |
| 2. | "Desert Ride" | Jerry Styner | | 1:23 |
| 3. | "Maria's Theme (Vocal)" | Guy Hemric, Jerry Styner | Barbara Kelly & the Morning Good | 2:27 |
| 4. | "Shacktown Revenge" | Jerry Styner | Barbara Kelly & the Morning Good | 1:58 |
| 5. | "The Medal" | Jerry Styner | Barbara Kelly & the Morning Good | 1:36 |
| 6. | "Here Comes the Fuzz" | Jerry Styner | Barbara Kelly & the Morning Good | 1:15 |
| 7. | "Iron Butterfly Theme" | Doug Ingle | Iron Butterfly | 4:32 |
| 8. | "Unconscious Power" | Doug Ingle, Danny Weis, Ron Bushy | Iron Butterfly | 2:30 |
| 9. | "Everyone Should Own a Dream" | Guy Hemric, Jerry Styner | Iron Butterfly | 2:23 |
| 10. | "The Deal" | Jerry Styner | Iron Butterfly | 1:43 |
| 11. | "Desert Love" | Jerry Styner | Iron Butterfly | 1:47 |
| 12. | "Ballad of the Savage Seven" | Guy Hemric, Valjean Johns | Barbara Kelly & the Morning Good | 2:35 |
| 13. | "Maria's Theme (Instrumental)" | Guy Hemric, Jerry Styner | Barbara Kelly & the Morning Good | 2:08 |
| 14. | "The Savage Struggle" | Jerry Styner | Barbara Kelly & the Morning Good | 2:24 |
