= Tales of Brave Ulysses =

- Norway picture sleeve

Single by Cream

from the album Disraeli Gears
- A-side: "Strange Brew"
- Released: 26 May 1967 (single); 2 November 1967 (album)
- Recorded: May 1967
- Studio: Atlantic, New York City
- Genre: Psychedelic rock
- Length: 2:50
- Label: Reaction (UK); Atco (US)
- Composer: Eric Clapton
- Lyricist: Martin Sharp
- Producer: Felix Pappalardi

Cream UK singles chronology
"I Feel Free" (1966)	"Tales of Brave Ulysses" (1967)	"Anyone for Tennis" (1968)

Cream US singles chronology
"I Feel Free" (1967)	"Tales of Brave Ulysses" (1967)	"Spoonful" (1967)

Audio sample
- file; help

"Tales of Brave Ulysses" is a song recorded in 1967 by British group Cream. It was released as the B-side to the "Strange Brew" single in May 1967. In November, the song was included on Cream's second album, Disraeli Gears. The song features one of the earliest uses of a wah-wah pedal, which guitarist Eric Clapton plays throughout the song. Cream's song "White Room" copies the chord progression to a large extent.

== Background and recording ==
The song was the first collaboration between guitarist Eric Clapton and artist Martin Sharp. Clapton composed the music, inspired by the Lovin' Spoonful's 1966 hit "Summer in the City". "I just started chatting to Eric", said Sharp, who lived in the same building. "I told him I had written a poem. He, in turn, told me he'd written some music. So I gave him my poem. Two weeks later, he turned up with it on the B-side of a 45 record." Sharp had written the lyrics to the melody of Leonard Cohen's song "Suzanne," specifically the Judy Collins version. In an interview at the time of the song's release, Clapton revealed that the Greek mythos-inspired subject matter stemmed from Sharp's love of the Mediterranean islands and that he had written it the previous winter, wishing he were out in the sun.

In his 2007 autobiography, Clapton recalls:

When [first meeting Sharp] he heard that I was a musician, he told me he had written a poem that he thought would make good lyrics for a song. As it happens, I had in my mind at that moment an idea inspired by a favorite song of mine by the Lovin' Spoonful called "Summer in the City," so I asked him to show me the words. He wrote them down on a napkin and gave them to me ... These became the lyrics of the song "Tales of Brave Ulysses".

The song uses a "C/B flat/F chord pattern", which Greenwald describes as "simple but effective". Jack Bruce, on bass, also provides the vocal, and Ginger Baker is on drums.

Cream recorded the song at Atlantic Studios in New York City in May 1967, during the sessions for Disraeli Gears. Atlantic brought in engineer Tom Dowd and producer Felix Pappalardi to work with Cream on their next album. For the recording, Clapton used a wah-wah pedal guitar effects unit for the first time.

== Release and reception ==
The song was the B-side for "Strange Brew" released on 26 May 1967, five months ahead of the group's second album, Disraeli Gears, which included both songs. Cash Box called it a "visionary hard rock excursion." Derek Johnson at New Musical Express opined "a complex enigmatic lyric combined with a pounding whalloping beat. Bit more psychedelic than the top side, but not nauseatingly so". Retrospectively, AllMusic's Matthew Greenwald calls it, "One of a few overtly psychedelic songs to have aged gracefully ... Lyrically, it's a relatively factual and colorful rendering of the great Greek tragedy Ulysses".

Cream performed the song in concert and a 10 March 1968 recording from Winterland in San Francisco is included on Live Cream Volume II.

== Sources ==
- Hjort, Christopher (2007). Strange Brew: Eric Clapton & the British Blues Boom, 1965–1970. London, UK: Jawbone Press. pp. g. 29. ISBN 978-1-906002-00-8.
- Ertegün, Ahmet (2006). Classic Albums: Cream – Disraeli Gears (DVD). Eagle Rock Entertainment.
