= Sitting on Top of the World =

Blues standard

Single by Mississippi Sheiks
- B-side: "Lonely One in This Town"
- Released: 1930
- Recorded: February 17, 1930
- Genre: Country blues
- Length: 3:10
- Label: Okeh
- Songwriters: Walter Vinson, Lonnie Chatmon

"Sitting on Top of the World" (also "Sittin' on Top of the World") is a country blues song written by Walter Vinson and Lonnie Chatmon. They were core members of the Mississippi Sheiks, who first recorded it in 1930. Vinson claimed to have composed the song one morning after playing at a white dance in Greenwood, Mississippi. It became a popular crossover hit, and was inducted into the Grammy Hall of Fame in 2008.

"Sitting on Top of the World" has become a standard of traditional American music. The song has been widely recorded in a variety of different styles – folk, blues, country, bluegrass, rock – often with considerable variations and/or additions to the original verses. The lyrics of the original song convey a stoic optimism in the face of emotional setbacks, and the song has been described as a "simple, elegant distillation of the Blues". In 2018, it was selected for preservation in the National Recording Registry by the Library of Congress as being "culturally, historically, or aesthetically significant".

== Background and composition ==
The title line of "Sitting on Top of the World" is similar to a well-known popular song of the 1920s, "I'm Sitting on Top of the World", written by Ray Henderson, Sam Lewis and Joe Young (popularized by Al Jolson in 1926). However, the two songs are distinct, both musically and lyrically. Similarities have also been noted between "Sitting on Top of the World" and an earlier song by Tampa Red.

Lyrically, "Sitting on Top of the World" has a simple structure consisting of a series of rhyming couplets, each followed by the two-line chorus. The structural economy of the song seems to be conducive to creative invention, giving the song a dynamic flexibility exemplified by the numerous and diverse versions that exist. The song has a strophic nine-bar blues structure. Bar nine provides rhythmic separation between stanzas, the end of one stanza and the relatively large pickup at the beginning of the next.

== Renditions ==
After the Mississippi Sheiks original, renditions of "Sitting on Top of the World" were recorded by a number of artists. Following a recording for Bluebird Records by Milton Brown and His Musical Brownies, the song became a staple in the repertoire of country and bluegrass artists, such as Bob Wills and his Texas Playboys and Bill Monroe.

Howlin' Wolf reworked the song as a Chicago blues, which Chess Records issued as a single in 1957 and later included on the popular compilation series The Real Folk Blues (1966). For the recording, he was backed by a typical blues ensemble consisting of electric guitar (Hubert Sumlin), piano (Hosea Lee Kennard), bass (Alfred Elkins), and drums (Earl Phillips). During performances later in his career, Howlin' Wolf often closed his sets with "Sitting on Top of the World". As with several of his songs, it was adapted by rock groups during the 1960s. Some rock-oriented versions showed considerable variation: a version by the Grateful Dead was played at a very fast tempo of 252 beats per minute (bpm), while Cream performed it at a very slow 44 bpm on their 1968 album Wheels Of Fire.

Jack White recorded an acoustic version for the soundtrack to the 2003 film Cold Mountain. An AllMusic review included "For the most part, the White Stripes frontman successfully transplants himself into the [traditional country and Americana] genre, utilizing his throaty warble on Howlin' Wolf's 'Sittin' on Top of the World' like a dust-bowl carny."

Beth Hart & Joe Bonamassa included a copy on their 2018 album Black Coffee.
