= White Room =

- Italian single picture sleeve

Single by Cream

from the album Wheels of Fire
- B-side: "Those Were the Days"
- Released: September 1968
- Recorded: July 1967 – April 1968
- Studio: Atlantic, New York City
- Genre: Psychedelic rock; blues rock; hard rock
- Length: 3:04 (US single); 4:58 (album & UK single)
- Label: Polydor (UK); Atco (US)
- Composer: Jack Bruce
- Lyricist: Pete Brown
- Producer: Felix Pappalardi

Cream US singles chronology
"Anyone for Tennis" (1968)	"White Room" (1968)	"Crossroads" (1969)

Cream UK singles chronology
"Sunshine of Your Love" (1968)	"White Room" (1969)	"Badge" (1969)

Audio sample
- Intro and part of first verse: file; help

"White Room" is a song by British rock band Cream, composed by bassist Jack Bruce with lyrics by poet Pete Brown. Cream recorded it for the studio half of the 1968 double album Wheels of Fire. In September, a shorter US single edit (without the third verse) was released for AM radio stations, although album-oriented FM radio stations played the full album version. The subsequent UK single release in January 1969 used the full-length album version of the track.

== Recording and composition ==
Lyricist Pete Brown's original idea for the song revolved around a hippie girl titled "Cinderella's Last Goodnight", but when that did not work, he dipped into an earlier eight page poem he had written about a new apartment he had moved into with white walls and bare furnishings, where he gave up drinking and drugs. The personal demons he battled while living in the white room spawned the imagery of the poem, which was eventually whittled down to a few verses for the song lyric.

In July 1967, at the initial sessions for Cream's third album (then still unnamed), recording for "White Room" began in London. In October and December work continued at Atlantic Studios in New York City and was completed during three sessions in February, April and June 1968, also at Atlantic.

Jack Bruce sang and played bass on the song, Eric Clapton overdubbed guitar parts, Ginger Baker played drums and timpani, and Felix Pappalardi – the group's producer – contributed violas. Clapton played his guitar through a wah-wah pedal to achieve a "talking-effect". The song has an identical chord progression to Cream's previous recording "Tales of Brave Ulysses". Both Bruce and Baker claimed to have added the distinctive 5/4 or quintuple metre opening to what had been a 4/4 or common time composition. Bruce later revealed that the 5/4 opening had made the record company wary that it would do well commercially.

== Credits ==
- Jack Bruce – lead vocals, bass, songwriter
- Eric Clapton – lead and rhythm guitars
- Ginger Baker – drums, timpani
- Felix Pappalardi – violas, producer
- Pete Brown – songwriter

== Recognition and other recordings ==
Rolling Stone ranked "White Room" at number 376 on its list of the "500 Greatest Songs of All Time". A live recording appears on the group's Live Cream Volume II album (1972). Clapton, along with Phil Collins, began his act at Live Aid in 1985 with the song. In 1990, Clapton performed the song at his Royal Albert Hall concert series and in 1999 with Sheryl Crow at Crow's Sheryl Crow and Friends: Live from Central Park concert. In 2005, the reunited Cream played the song at the Royal Albert Hall, which was released on their Royal Albert Hall London May 2-3-5-6, 2005 album.

In a song review for AllMusic, Stephen Thomas Erlewine noted that the song has been "covered frequently, and by a bizarre group of artists: Broadway star Joel Grey, the Finnish symphonic metal band Apocalyptica, fusion guitarist Frank Gambale, the Bluegrass-inspired Cache Valley Drifters, and heavy metal band Helloween. That wildly eclectic list proves that 'White Room' is a multi-faceted song, containing equal parts dramatic spectacle, intricate musicality, and hard rock menace. Other artists emphasize different elements in their interpretations, but the original Cream version wrapped it all up in one startling package".

Billboard described the single as a "solid, driving rocker".

== Charts ==
=== Weekly charts ===
Chart (1968–2019)	Peak position
Australia (Go-Set)	1
Austria (Ö3 Austria Top 40)	19
Belgium (Ultratop 50 Flanders)	14
Belgium (Ultratop 50 Wallonia)	44
Canada (RPM Top 100)	2
Canada (CHUM Chart)	1
Finland (Suomen Virallinen)	10
France (IFOP)	73
Germany (GfK)	28
Malaysia (RTM)	1
Netherlands (Dutch Top 40)	4
Netherlands (Single Top 100)	2
New Zealand (Listener)	2
Spain (AFYVE)	15
UK Singles (Official Charts)	28
US Billboard Hot 100	6
US Cashbox Top Singles	5
US Hot Rock & Alternative Songs (Billboard)	15

=== Year-end charts ===
Chart (1968)	Rank
Canada	39
Netherlands (Dutch Top 40)	51
US Billboard Hot 100	81
US Cash Box	48

== Certifications ==
Region	Certification	Certified units/sales
United Kingdom (BPI) Sales since 2004	Gold	400,000^{‡}
^{‡} Sales+streaming figures based on certification alone.

== Deep Purple version ==
A version of the track was featured on Deep Purple's 2021 covers album Turning to Crime.

=== Personnel ===
Deep Purple

- Ian Gillan – lead and backing vocals
- Roger Glover – bass
- Ian Paice – drums
- Steve Morse – guitar
- Don Airey – keyboards

Additional personnel

- Bob Ezrin – backing vocals
