= Strange Brew (song) =

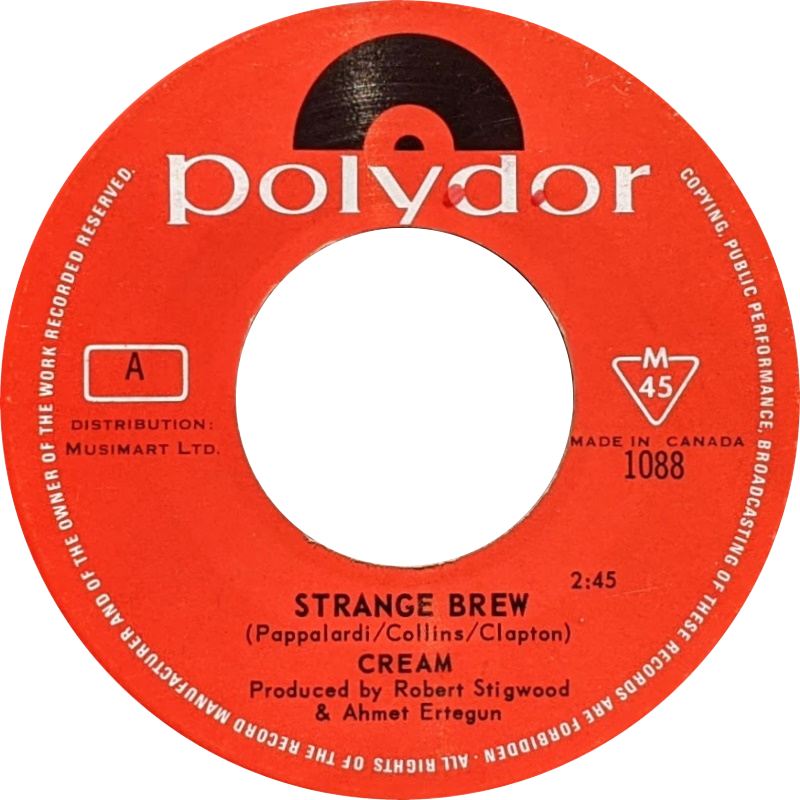
- Side A of Canadian single

Single by Cream

from the album Disraeli Gears
- B-side: "Tales of Brave Ulysses"
- Released: 26 May 1967 (single); 2 November 1967 (album)
- Recorded: April 1967
- Studio: Atlantic, New York City
- Genre: Psychedelic rock; blues rock
- Length: 2:45
- Label: Reaction (UK); Atco (US)
- Songwriters: Eric Clapton; Felix Pappalardi; Gail Collins
- Producer: Felix Pappalardi

Cream UK singles chronology
"I Feel Free" (1966)	"Strange Brew" (1967)	"Anyone for Tennis" (1968)

Cream US singles chronology
"I Feel Free" (1967)	"Strange Brew" (1967)	"Spoonful" (1967)

Music video
- Cream – "Strange Brew" (1967) on YouTube

"Strange Brew" is a song by the British rock band Cream. First released as a single in May 1967 in the UK and July 1967 in the US, it was later added to their second studio album Disraeli Gears. The song features Eric Clapton on lead vocals rather than the usual lead by Jack Bruce. The single peaked at number 17 on the UK Singles Chart in July of that same year. In the UK, it was the last Cream single to be released by Reaction Records.

== Background ==
In April 1967, during their first trip to New York, at the beginning of the sessions for what would become the Disraeli Gears album, Cream recorded a song called "Lawdy Mama" at Atlantic Studios. The band cut two versions of the song, the first a typical blues shuffle, and the second converted to straight time in a more rock 'n' roll style (both versions can be heard on the Those Were the Days collection). Producer Felix Pappalardi took the tape of the second version of "Lawdy Mama" and, with help from his wife Gail Collins, transformed the song into "Strange Brew", which, according to Eric Clapton, "created a pop song without completely destroying the original groove." Author Robert Palmer noted that Clapton at this stage was employing Albert King guitar stylings; and that both "Strange Brew" and another Cream track, "Born Under a Bad Sign", "were practically Albert King parodies". Clapton's guitar solo on "Strange Brew" is taken nearly note for note from Albert King's solo on "Oh Pretty Woman" (from King's Born Under a Bad Sign album) Clapton performs lead vocals on the song mostly in falsetto. It was the first Cream single on which he sang lead. Unlike the group's previous single, "I Feel Free", no promotional video was made for the song, but the band mimed to it on television on the German program Beat Club on 19 May 1967.

== Reception ==
Upon release, Cash Box called it a "driving, frenetic, medium-paced rock venture." Over in England, Melody Maker wrote it had "a sighing, wistful vocal and a deep resonant backing with Clapton bending and snaking out" although it concluded "maybe not the strongest song they could have put out and we think people expected a more unique idea from the Cream this time." In their review for Disraeli Gears, Rolling Stone named "Strange Brew" as "the most complex song and rather an unusual one in that Eric uses reverb - to stunningly mean and sensual effect - and it is really very far away from the usual blues stylings for which he has been noted." Retrospectively, Matthew Greenwald at AllMusic enthused that it "is one of the group's most treasured and definitive records and contains perhaps one of Eric Clapton's finest studio-recorded guitar solos.

== Chart performance ==
The song "Strange Brew" first appeared on the UK Singles Chart on the week ending 10 June 1967 at number 43. It hit its highest position number 17 on the week ending 15 July and then was at position number 35 in the week ending 5 August, its final week, having spent a total of nine weeks in the chart.

In the same week ending 8 July 1967 in the Netherlands, the song also peaked at number 18 on the Dutch Single Top 100 and number 30 on the Dutch Top 40. In Belgium, it also peaked at number 50 on 2 September 1967 in the Wallonia region of Ultratop 50.

== Personnel ==
- Eric Clapton – lead vocals, lead guitar, rhythm guitar
- Jack Bruce – bass guitar, backing vocal
- Ginger Baker – drums

== Charts ==
Chart (1967)	Peak position
Australia (Go-Set)	21
Belgium (Ultratop 50 Wallonia)	50
Netherlands (Single Top 100)	18
Netherlands (Dutch Top 40)	30
UK Singles (Official Charts)	17
