= Disraeli Gears =

1967 studio album by Cream

Studio album by Cream
- Released: 2 November 1967
- Recorded: 11–15 May 1967
- Studios: Atlantic, New York City
- Genres: Psychedelic rock; blues rock; hard rock
- Length: 33:02
- Label: Reaction
- Producer: Felix Pappalardi

Cream chronology
Fresh Cream (1966)	Disraeli Gears (1967)	Wheels of Fire (1968)

Singles from Disraeli Gears
- 1. "Strange Brew" / "Tales of Brave Ulysses" Released: June 1967; 2. "Sunshine of Your Love" / "SWLABR" Released: December 1967

Disraeli Gears is the second studio album by the British rock band Cream. It was produced by Felix Pappalardi and released on Reaction Records in 1967. The album features the singles "Strange Brew" and "Sunshine of Your Love".

The original 11-track album was remastered in 1998, and then subsequently released as a two-disc Deluxe Edition in 2004.

== Production ==
Early demo sessions for the album were held on March 15, 1967, at London's Ryemuse Studios which yielded rough renditions of "SWLABR", "Blue Condition" and "We're Going Wrong" as well as three other Bruce/Brown compositions: "Hey Now Princess", "The Weird Of Hermiston" and "The Clearout", the latter two of which would be re-recorded for Bruce's 1969 solo effort Songs for a Tailor. On April 3, following the band's nine shows as part of Murray the K's "Music in the 5th Dimension" concert series which comprised their first tour of America, Cream checked into Atlantic Studios in New York City with label owner Ahmet Ertegun to record a cover of "Lawdy Mama". Cream's American label, ATCO, was a wholly owned subsidiary of Atlantic Records. Encouraged by the results, Ertegun booked more time at the studio for a return visit to the US the following month.

The bulk of the album was recorded at Atlantic between 11 and 15 May 1967. The sessions were produced by Ertegun protege and future Mountain bassist Felix Pappalardi and engineered by Tom Dowd, who would later work with Clapton on projects such as Layla and Other Assorted Love Songs and 461 Ocean Boulevard. According to Dowd, the recording sessions took only three-and-a-half days, as the band's visas expired on the very last day of recording. Pappalardi soon proved his worth to the group when he took the tape of "Lawdy Mama" recorded in April and added new lyrics he co-wrote with his wife Gail Collins, transforming the song into "Strange Brew", the first track completed at the sessions (the Pappalardi songwriting team would also contribute "World of Pain").

The sessions were swift and efficient, with the band recording no more than one or two takes of a backing track and then adding minimal overdubs, despite an Ampex 8-track recorder now available to them; Dowd reportedly had to guide the group on the use of the new equipment. The recording atmosphere was also somewhat relaxed, with visitors often encouraged to drop by including Linda Eastman, Al Kooper, Janis Joplin and local groupie Jenny Dean (who provided many of the party sounds on "Take It Back"). Some friction ensued when Ertegun, who had expected the band to play blues, baulked at what he called the "psychedelic hogwash" of tracks like "Sunshine of Your Love" and "Tales of Brave Ulysses". Eventually he backed down after Booker T. Jones and Otis Redding both expressed their adoration of "Sunshine of Your Love". Believing the band to be led by Clapton, and that the star of a band should sing, he also baulked at the idea of Bruce or Baker taking any vocal leads but again relented after resistance from the group. The sessions reportedly concluded just hours before their visas expired and the band was due to fly back to the UK.

== Musical style ==
Disraeli Gears features the group veering away, quite heavily, from their blues roots and indulging in more psychedelic sounds, in particular on tracks such as "Tales of Brave Ulysses", "SWLABR", "World of Pain" and "Dance the Night Away". "Tales of Brave Ulysses" had been inspired by a trip to Ibiza that artist Martin Sharp had recently taken, where the sirens were alleged to have sung to Ulysses. "Dance the Night Away" was penned by Pete Brown as a tribute to the freedom dancing gave him after he quit drugs, while the words to "We're Going Wrong" had been written by Bruce after a fight he'd had with his wife. The most blues-like tunes on the album are Clapton's arrangement of "Outside Woman Blues", the Bruce-Brown composition "Take It Back" which had been inspired by the contemporary media images of American students burning their draft cards and featured harmonica work by Jack Bruce, plus the opening track "Strange Brew", which was based on the 12-bar blues "Lawdy Mama" and featured a guitar solo copied from Albert King's solo on "Oh Pretty Woman".

Unlike the previous Fresh Cream, which was vocally dominated by Bruce, the vocals on Disraeli Gears were a more democratic affair. Clapton sings lead on "Strange Brew" and "Outside Woman Blues", plus co-lead on "World of Pain", "Dance the Night Away" and "Sunshine of Your Love". Baker, meanwhile, performs lead vocals on his composition "Blue Condition" which the others encouraged him to write (an outtake features Clapton on vocal). All three band members sing together on "Mother's Lament".

In contrast to much of the band's other work, Disraeli Gears comprises mainly short, self-contained songs, with none of the improvisation and jamming for which the band was known onstage. In a track-by-track interview about the record for Record Mirror, Clapton revealed that "World of Pain" was one of his favorite tracks, written about the back tree in the garden of composer Pappalardi, and that "Dance the Night Away", with its 12-string guitars (the only time the instrument was used on a Cream recording), was Bruce's tribute to The Byrds, a band the group admired and were friends with. He also divulged that the full title of "SWLABR" is "She Walks Like A Bearded Rainbow" (which lyricist Brown admitted was about a man who defaces a painting of his girlfriend by adding facial hair) and was originally planned for release as a single, and that Eric himself chose Blind Joe Reynolds' "Outside Woman Blues" for the album so that one of his old blues idols would be able to collect royalties. With regards to "Mother's Lament", he stated that "at the end of every session we have a laugh by sitting around the piano doing a mock-English pub thing. We had a laugh with this one but it wasn't meant to be anything. We were then told it had been recorded and they wanted to put it on the album."

== Artwork and title ==
The cover art was created by Australian artist Martin Sharp who lived in the same building as Clapton, The Pheasantry in Chelsea. Sharp would go on to create the artwork to Cream's next album Wheels of Fire and co-wrote the songs "Tales of Brave Ulysses" and The Savage Seven movie theme "Anyone for Tennis" with Clapton. The photography was by Bob Whitaker, known for his work for the Beatles, including the controversial Yesterday and Today "butcher" cover. Most of the photographs were taken in July 1967, with shoots in London's Hyde Park as well as in the Scottish Highlands. Some of the images were shot on Ben Nevis, the tallest mountain in the British isles. The photos show a clean-shaven Clapton with a bouffant, permed hairstyle. By the time of the album's release in November, however, he was letting his hair grow out straight and had grown a moustache.

The front cover consists of a psychedelic collage with the title centred and band name below, surrounded by a floral arrangement. Martin Sharp was attempting to capture the sound of the music in the cover, which he describes as a "warm fluorescent sound":

I got hold of a publicity shot and cut it up, along with cutouts from various books, laid the pieces out and stuck them together as a collage on a 12-inch square. I did some drawing outlines, and then painted all over it with fluorescent inks and paints of the time. I really wanted to capture that warm, electric sound of their music in the colours and expression of the cover. On my way to England, I'd gone (to Cambodia). And in one of the towns I visited, there were these amazing sculptures with faces on each side, and huge trees growing out on top... Over the years, these great trees had taken root and grown. I suppose I thought that was a bit like the band: where you could see three faces, and the music coming out of their heads.

The cover art was later used for the compilation Those Were the Days.

Drummer Ginger Baker recalled how the album's title was based on a malapropism which alluded to 19th-century British Prime Minister Benjamin Disraeli:

You know how the title came about – Disraeli Gears – yeah? We had this Austin Westminster, and Mick Turner was one of the roadies who'd been with me a long time, and he was driving along and Eric [Clapton] was talking about getting a racing bicycle. Mick, driving, went 'Oh yeah – Disraeli gears!' meaning derailleur gears ... We all just fell over ... We said that's got to be the album title.

== Release ==
The album was released in November 1967 by Reaction Records and was a big commercial success, reaching No. 5 on the UK Albums Chart, No. 4 in the US and No. 1 on the Swedish and Finnish charts. The album was also No. 1 for two weeks on the Australian album chart and was listed as the No. 1 album of 1968 by Cash Box in its year-end album chart.

=== Deluxe Edition ===
The original 11-track album was remastered by Joseph M. Palmaccio at PolyGram Studios for a 1998 release, including bonus photographs accompanying the original album artwork.

The Disraeli Gears Deluxe Edition includes the complete album in both mono and stereo, demos, alternative takes and tracks taken from the band's live sessions on BBC radio. Included is an outtake of "Blue Condition" with Eric Clapton on lead vocals, and demos of the songs "Weird of Hermiston" and "The Clearout" which were not released until Jack Bruce's first solo album Songs for a Tailor.

== Reception ==
Professional ratings
Review scores
Source	Rating
AllMusic	4.5/5 stars
Chicago Tribune	3.5/4 stars
The Encyclopedia of Popular Music	5/5 stars
The Great Rock Discography	9/10
Music Story	5/5 stars
MusicHound Rock	4.5/5 stars
Sputnikmusic	5/5 stars

The album was highly praised on release. Melody Maker stated that it was "a quality-heavy, propelling package of incredible Cream superpower. Clapton's guitar menacing almost like a machine gun, sometimes eerily and overpoweringly persuasive as it reaches serpent-like deep into the Cream's varied and hypnotic musical journeys." Disc & Music Echo raved it "shows the completely individual way the group is developing from their early blues days", pointing out that all the songs are "more or less perfect and it's merely a matter of personal bias which you think is best." In the United States, Rolling Stone gave a largely positive review, noting it displayed a more original direction than the debut album with "miles of listening pleasure" in tracks like "Strange Brew", "Sunshine Of Your Love", "SWLABR" and "Take It Back" but also critiquing that the album "does not totally hang together" where "in some tracks the material is too pale to support the heavy instrumental work which makes Cream such an overwhelming trio".

Retrospectively, writing for the BBC, Chris Jones described the album as "a perfect encapsulation of the point where the blues got psychedelic and in turn got heavy". Classic Rock's Louder notes "it captured epic studio performances by Jack Bruce, Eric Clapton and Ginger Baker at the peak of their powers as a group" and "became a touchstone recording of the '60s counterculture." Thomas Erlewine of AllMusic describes the album as "a quintessential heavy rock album of the '60s" while Dave Swanson of Ultimate Classic Rock likewise believes the album to be their masterpiece.

In 1999, the album was inducted into the Grammy Hall of Fame.

It was voted number 182 in the third edition of Colin Larkin's All Time Top 1000 Albums (2000). In 2003 the album was ranked number 112 on Rolling Stone magazine's list of the 500 Greatest Albums of All Time, then was re-ranked at number 114 in a 2012 revised list, and at number 170 in a 2020 revised list. VH1 named it 87th-greatest album of all time in 2001.

In 2008, the album won a Classic Rock Roll of Honours Award for Classic Album.

== Track listing ==
=== Original album ===
Side one
No.	Title	Writer(s)	Lead vocals	Length
1.	"Strange Brew"	Eric Clapton; Felix Pappalardi; Gail Collins	Eric Clapton	2:46
2.	"Sunshine of Your Love"	Jack Bruce; Clapton; Pete Brown	Bruce and Clapton	4:10
3.	"World of Pain"	Pappalardi; Collins	Bruce and Clapton	3:02
4.	"Dance the Night Away"	Bruce; Brown	Bruce and Clapton	3:34
5.	"Blue Condition"	Ginger Baker	Ginger Baker	3:29
Total length:				17:01

Side two
No.	Title	Writer(s)	Lead vocals	Length
1.	"Tales of Brave Ulysses"	Clapton; Martin Sharp	Bruce	2:46
2.	"SWLABR"	Bruce; Brown	Bruce	2:31
3.	"We're Going Wrong"	Bruce	Bruce	3:27
4.	"Outside Woman Blues"	Blind Joe Reynolds, arr. Clapton	Clapton	2:25
5.	"Take It Back"	Bruce; Brown	Bruce	3:05
6.	"Mother's Lament"	Traditional, (Note: Cream possibly got the song from British folk singer Martin Carthy. There are earlier versions - one known as "When Mother Was Bathing the Baby", credited to Elton Box, Desmond Cox, and Irwin Dash under the collective pseudonym Jack Spade; and another known as "The Drain Song" credited to Amsterdam and Kirkpatrick.) arr. Bruce, Clapton, Baker	Baker, Clapton, and Bruce	1:47
Total length:				16:01

=== Disraeli Gears – deluxe edition (2004) ===
==== Disc one (stereo) ====
Original album
Tracks 1–11
Out-takes

12. "Lawdy Mama" – version 1 ^{3} (Traditional, arr. Clapton) – 2:00

Recorded 3 April 1967 at Atlantic Studios
Recorded by Ahmet Ertegun

13. "Blue Condition" – alternate version (Baker) – 3:13

Eric Clapton vocal, previously unreleased

Demos ^{3}

14. "We're Going Wrong" (Bruce) – 3:49
15. "Hey Now, Princess" (Bruce, Brown) – 3:31
16. "SWLABR" (Bruce, Brown) – 4:30
17. "Weird of Hermiston" (Bruce, Brown) – 3:12
18. "The Clearout" (Bruce, Brown) – 3:58

Recorded 15 March 1967 at Ryemuse Studios, London

==== Disc two (mono) ====
Original album and out-takes
Tracks 1–13
BBC recordings ^{4}

14. "Strange Brew" (Clapton, Pappalardi, Collins) – 3:00
15. "Tales of Brave Ulysses" (Clapton, Sharp) – 2:55
16. "We're Going Wrong" (Bruce) – 3:25

Recorded 30 May 1967, broadcast 3 June on BBC Light Programme

17. "Born Under a Bad Sign" (Booker T. Jones, William Bell) – 3:03
18. "Outside Woman Blues" (Reynolds) – 3:18
19. "Take It Back" (Bruce, Brown) – 2:17

Recorded 24 October 1967, broadcast 29 October on BBC Radio 1

20. "Politician" (Bruce, Brown) – 3:59
21. "SWLABR" (Bruce, Brown) – 2:32
22. "Steppin' Out" (James Bracken) – 3:37

Recorded 9 January 1968, broadcast 14 January on BBC Radio 1

1. Tracks previously released on the Those Were the Days box set.
2. Tracks previously released on the BBC Sessions compilation album.

== Personnel ==
A. Side One, B. Side Two

Cream

- Jack Bruce – vocals (all tracks except A.1, A.5, B.4); bass guitar (all tracks except B.6); piano (A.5, B.6); harmonica (B.5)
- Eric Clapton – vocals (A.1–4, B.4, B.6); electric guitar (all tracks except A.4, B.6); twelve-string guitar (A.4)
- Ginger Baker – drums (all tracks except B.6); percussion (all tracks except B.6); vocals (A.5, B.6)

Production

- Felix Pappalardi – producer
- Tom Dowd – recording engineer
- Bob Whitaker – cover photography
- Martin Sharp – cover art
- Jim Marshall – additional photography

== Charts ==
=== Weekly charts ===
Chart (1967–1969)	Peak position
Australian Albums (Kent Music Report)	1
Canada Top Albums/CDs (RPM)	10
Finnish Albums (Suomen virallinen lista)	1
French Albums (SNEP)	2
New Zealand Albums (Recorded Music NZ)	4
Norwegian Albums (VG-lista)	16
UK Albums (Official Charts)	5
US Billboard 200	4

Chart (2019–2021)	Peak position
Greek Albums (IFPI)	29
Scottish Albums (Official Charts)	98
Swedish Physical Albums (Sverigetopplistan)	16
Swedish Vinyl Albums (Sverigetopplistan)	1
UK Vinyl Albums (OCC)	18

=== Year-end charts ===
Chart (1968)	Position
Australian Albums (Kent Music Report)	8
New Zealand Albums (Recorded Music NZ)	9
US Top Pop Albums (Cashbox)	1

== Certifications ==
Region	Certification	Certified units/sales
Australia (ARIA)	Platinum	70,000^{^}
United Kingdom (BPI) 1998 release	Gold	100,000^{^}
United States (RIAA)	Platinum	1,000,000^{^}
^{^} Shipments figures based on certification alone.

== Release history ==
Region	Date	Label	Format	Catalogue
United Kingdom	November 1967	Reaction Records	mono LP	593 003
United Kingdom	November 1967	Reaction Records	stereo LP	594 003
United States	November 1967	Atco Records	mono LP	33-232
United States	November 1967	Atco Records	stereo LP	SD 33-232
Germany	November 1967	Polydor Records	stereo LP	184 105
Japan	May 1968	Polydor Records	stereo LP	MP-1390
United States	1977	RSO Records	LP	RS 1–3010
United States	1986	Polydor Records	CD	823 636-2
United States	2004	Polydor Records/Chronciles	Deluxe Edition CD	B0003331-02
United Kingdom	2004	Polydor Records	Deluxe Edition CD	0602498193129
Japan	2013	USM Japan	SACD	UIGY 15002

== See also ==
- Album era
