= Walter Vinson =

American singer

- Vinson c. 1960s

Background information
- Born: February 2, 1901; Bolton, Mississippi, U.S.
- Died: April 22, 1975 (aged 74) Chicago, Illinois, U.S.
- Genres: Memphis blues
- Occupations: Musician; songwriter
- Instruments: Guitar; vocals
- Years active: 1920s–1970
- Formerly of: The Mississippi Sheiks

Walter Vinson (February 2, 1901 – April 22, 1975) was an American Memphis blues guitarist, singer and songwriter. He was a member of the Mississippi Sheiks, worked with Bo Chatmon and his brothers, and co-wrote the blues standard "Sitting on Top of the World". He is erroneously known as Walter Vincson or Walter Vincent. He sometimes recorded as Walter Jacobs, using his mother's maiden name.

== Biography ==
Vinson was born in Bolton, Mississippi, and grew up performing music locally. He rarely performed on his own but was regularly part of a duet, trio or group.

He worked with Son Spand, Rubin Lacey and Papa Charlie McCoy in the early to mid-1920s. In 1928 he teamed with Lonnie Chatmon to form the Mississippi Sheiks. The Sheiks and related groups, such as the Mississippi Mud Steppers, the Mississippi Hot Footers and Blacksnakes, recorded about a hundred sides in the first half of the 1930s, among them original compositions (probably by Vinson) such as "The World Is Going Wrong" and "I've Got Blood in My Eyes for You" (1931) (both recorded by Bob Dylan) or the topical "Sales Tax" (1934). Vinson claimed to have composed "Sitting on Top of the World" one morning, after playing at a white dance in Greenwood, Mississippi.

After the Sheiks split up in 1933, Vinson moved around the United States, recording with various musicians, including Leroy Carter and Mary Butler. He moved from Jackson, Mississippi, to New Orleans and ultimately to Chicago. By the mid-1940s his appearances in blues clubs had dwindled. After a lengthy break from music, he reappeared as a performer in 1960. He played at music festivals and recorded further tracks over the next decade, before the onset of hardening of the arteries curtailed his public appearances. Ill health forced him to move to a Chicago nursing home in 1972.

Vinson died in Chicago in 1975 at the age of 74. He was interred at the Holy Sepulchre Cemetery in Alsip, Illinois, in a grave that remained unmarked until 2009.

In 2004, the Mississippi Sheiks were inducted in the Mississippi Musicians Hall of Fame. "Sitting on Top of the World" was inducted into the Grammy Hall of Fame in 2008.

In 2009, a concert produced by Steve Salter, of the nonprofit organization Killer Blues, raised monies to place a headstone on Vinson's grave. The concert was held at the Howmet Playhouse Theater in Whitehall, Michigan, and featured the blues musicians Thomas Esparza and Lonnie Blonde. The event was a success, and a stone was placed in October 2009.

== Discography ==
Year of release	Album title	Record label
1991	Complete Recorded Works (1928–1941)	Document Records

== See also ==
- List of Memphis blues musicians
