= Martin Sharp =

Australian artist (1942–2013)

Martin Sharp AM
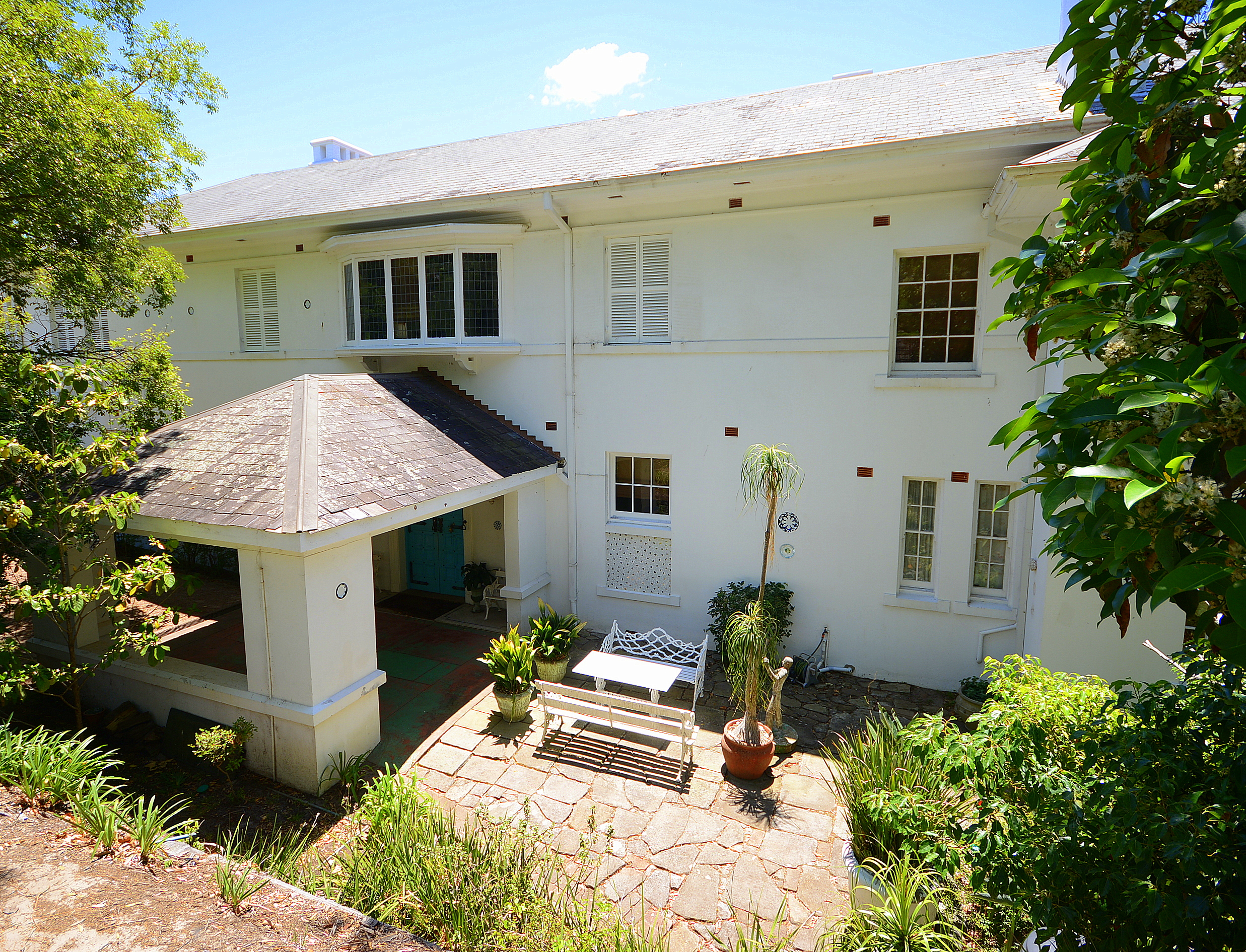
- Wirian, Sharp's home in Bellevue Hill, Sydney, 1978–2013
- Born: Martin Ritchie Sharp; 21 January 1942; Sydney, Australia
- Died: 1 December 2013 (age 71); Sydney, Australia

Martin Ritchie Sharp (21 January 1942 – 1 December 2013) was an Australian artist, cartoonist, songwriter and film-maker.

== Career ==
Sharp was born in Bellevue Hill, New South Wales in 1942, and educated at Cranbrook private school, where one of his teachers was the artist Justin O'Brien.

In 1960, Sharp enrolled at the National Art School at East Sydney.

He was one of the editors of Oz, an Australia/UK alternative/underground satire magazine published from 1963 to 1973 and associated with the international counterculture of that era.

Sharp was called Australia's foremost pop artist. He wrote the lyrics of the Cream songs "Tales of Brave Ulysses and "Anyone for Tennis"," and created the cover art for Cream's Disraeli Gears and Wheels of Fire albums.

He designed at least two posters for Australia's premier contemporary circus, Circus Oz, including the 'World-famous'/'Non-Stop Energy' design.

== Later interests ==
For most of the 1970s and beyond, Sharp's work and life was dominated by two major interests: Sydney's Luna Park and the entertainer Tiny Tim.

=== Luna Park ===
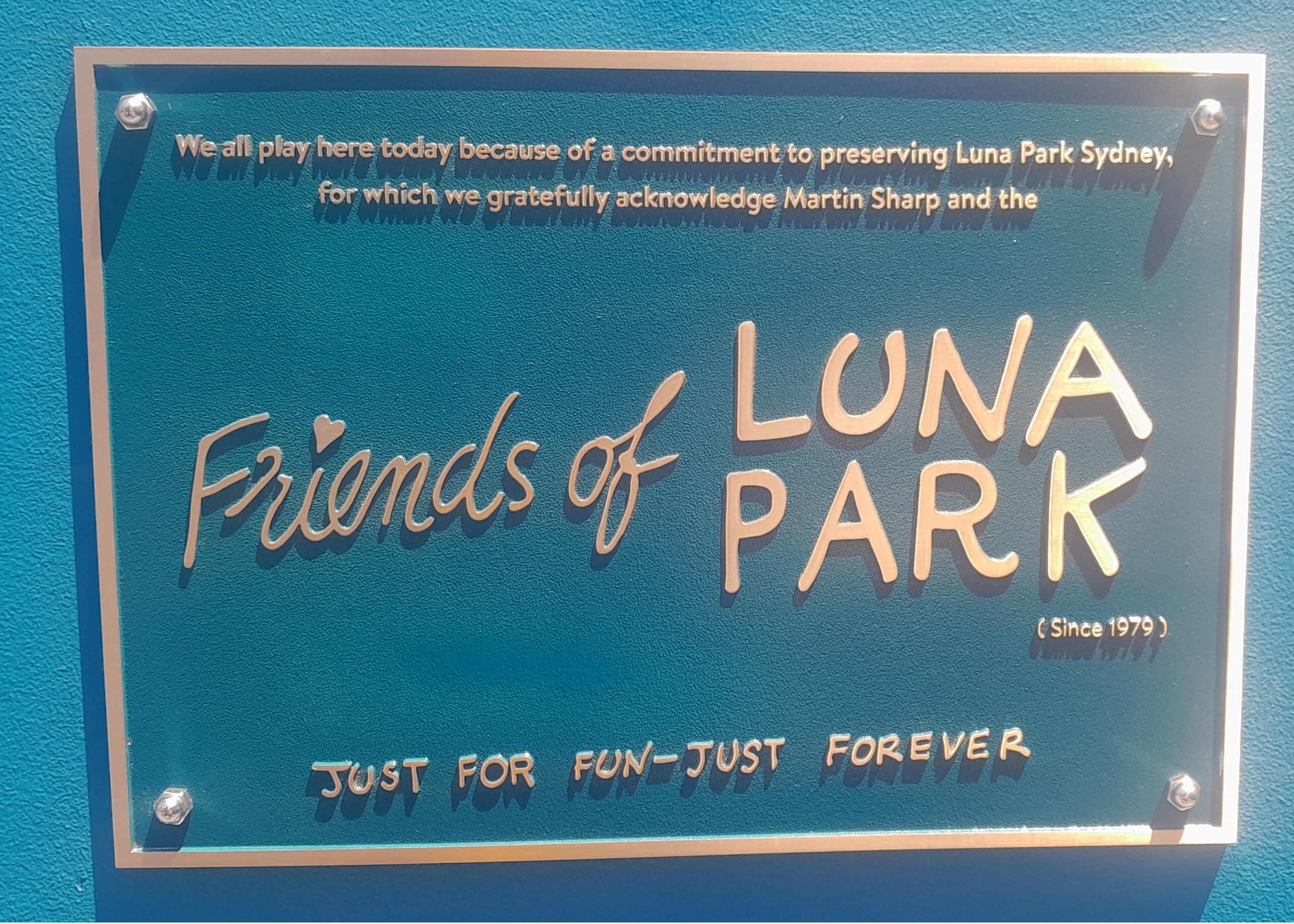
Plaque commemorating the efforts of Friends of Luna Park activists and in particular Sharp, installed in 2023.

In 1973, a group of pop artists were commissioned by Luna Park Sydney's management. Led by Sharp and Peter Kingston, they worked to restore and revitalise the park. Sharp's involvement at Luna Park would later prove to be a bittersweet experience.

In 1979, as pressure mounted to redevelop the prime harbourside site, a fire in the Ghost Train claimed seven lives, including a father and his two sons and four 13-year-old schoolmates. The fire was a turning point in Sharp's life; like many others he firmly believed that it was a deliberate act of terrorism aimed at destroying the park and making the site available for redevelopment. He later stated this had a profound effect on his spiritual outlook.

Throughout the 1980s and 1990s, Sharp played an important role in saving Luna Park from development as the head of the Friends of Luna Park activist group.

=== Tiny Tim ===
Sharp first saw performer Tiny Tim at the Royal Albert Hall in 1968 at the suggestion of Eric Clapton. From that time on, Tiny Tim was one of Sharp's strongest inspirations.

"Tim's appropriation of song is very much like my appropriation of images. We are both collagists taking the elements of different epochs and mixing them to discover new relationships."

=== "Eternity" ===
Sharp's work was celebrated in many exhibitions including a special Yellow House exhibition at the Art Gallery of NSW and a major retrospective at the Museum of Sydney which ran from October 2009 to March 2010.

=== Sydney Opera House ===
Sharp maintained a lifelong friendship with artist Lin Utzon, daughter of the Danish architect of the Sydney Opera House Jørn Utzon. The architect was controversially forced from his uncompleted masterpiece in 1966 and secretly left Australia with the aid of Sharp's mother.

In the mid-1990s, Sharp helped broker a reconciliation between the Sydney Opera House and Jørn Utzon, who subsequently developed a set of design principles to guide the building's future.

=== Street of Dreams ===
Sharp merged several of his key obsessions—‌Tiny Tim, Luna Park, Sydney and the 1979 Luna Park Ghost Train fire—‌into a planned feature documentary entitled Street of Dreams that explored all of these themes and the perceived connections between them. The film was never finished, though a rough cut screened at festivals circulates online.

== Death ==
Sharp inherited the heritage-listed house Wirian, in Victoria Road, Bellevue Hill, Sydney, in 1978. The house had been bought by Sharp's grandfather, Stuart Douglas Ritchie, a merchant, in 1937 for 20,000 pounds. Sharp lived there until he died from emphysema on 1 December 2013, at the age of 71.

== See also ==
- Martin Sharp – Profile at MILESAGO
- Hapshash and the Coloured Coat
- Martin Sharp – Official website
- Guardian obituary by Marsha Rowe
