= Cream (band) =

English rock supergroup

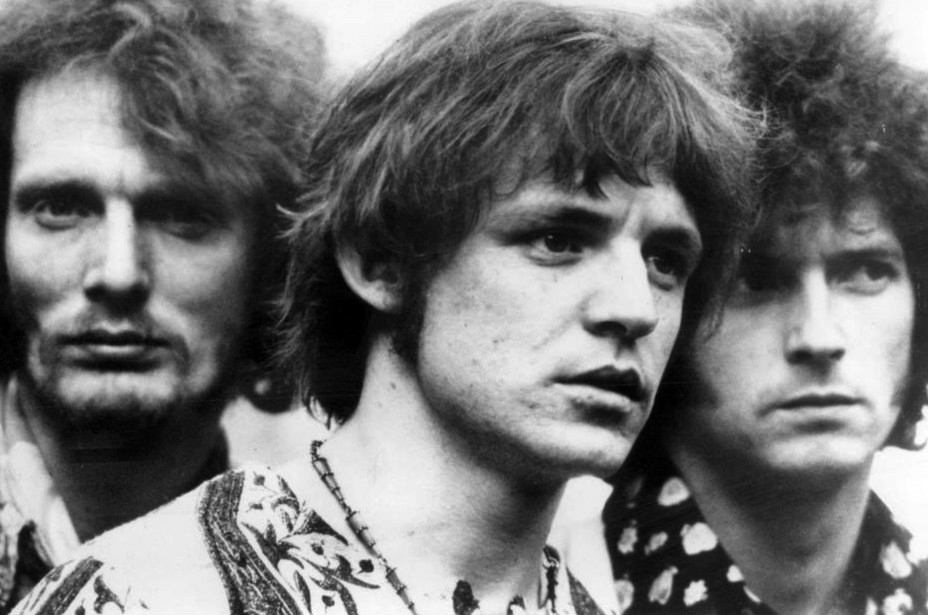
- Cream in 1967. From left to right: Ginger Baker, Jack Bruce and Eric Clapton

Background information
- Origin: London, England
- Genres: Psychedelic rock; blues rock; acid rock; hard rock; jam rock
- Works: Albums and singles; songs
- Years active: 1966–1968; 1993; 2005
- Labels: Reaction; Polydor; Atco; RSO; Reprise
- Spinoffs: Blind Faith
- Spinoff of: Alexis Korner's Blues Incorporated; The Graham Bond Organisation; John Mayall & the Bluesbreakers
- Past members: Jack Bruce; Eric Clapton; Ginger Baker
- Website: creambandofficial.com

Cream were a British rock supergroup formed in London in 1966. The group consisted of bassist Jack Bruce, guitarist Eric Clapton, and drummer Ginger Baker. Bruce was the primary songwriter and vocalist, although Clapton and Baker contributed to songs. Formed by members of previously successful bands, they are widely considered to be the first so-called supergroup in rock history. Cream were highly regarded for the instrumental proficiency of each of their members.

During their brief three-year career, the band released four albums: Fresh Cream (1966), Disraeli Gears (1967), Wheels of Fire (1968), and Goodbye (1969). Beginning with Disraeli Gears, the band were joined in the studio by producer and multi-instrumentalist Felix Pappalardi. Their music spanned rock styles such as blues rock, psychedelia, and hard rock. Throughout their career, they sold more than 15 million records worldwide. The group's third album, Wheels of Fire (1968), is the first platinum-selling double album. They scored international hits with singles such as "Sunshine of Your Love" (1967) and "White Room" (1968).

Tensions between Bruce and Baker led to their decision in May 1968 to break up, although the band were persuaded to make a final album, Goodbye, and to tour, culminating in two final farewell concerts at the Royal Albert Hall on 25 and 26 November 1968, which were filmed and shown in theatres, then in 1977 released as a home video, Farewell Concert. The group briefly reunited twice following their breakup, in 1993 for their induction into the Rock and Roll Hall of Fame and again in 2005 for a series of concerts. Bruce died in 2014 followed by Baker in 2019, leaving Clapton as the last living member of the group.

In 1993, Cream were inducted into the Rock and Roll Hall of Fame. They were included in both Rolling Stone and VH1's lists of the "100 Greatest Artists of All Time", at numbers 67 and 61, respectively. They were also ranked number 16 on VH1's "100 Greatest Artists of Hard Rock".

== History ==
=== Formation (1966) ===
By July 1966, Eric Clapton's career with the Yardbirds and John Mayall & the Bluesbreakers had earned him a reputation as one of the premier blues guitarists in Britain. Clapton, however, found the environment of Mayall's band confining and sought to expand his playing in a new band. In 1966, Clapton met Ginger Baker, then the drummer of the Graham Bond Organisation, for which Jack Bruce had played bass guitar, harmonica, and piano. Baker felt stifled in the Graham Bond Organisation and had grown tired of Graham Bond's drug addictions and bouts of mental instability. "I had always liked Ginger", explained Clapton. "Ginger had come to see me play with the Bluesbreakers. After the gig, he drove me back to London in his Rover. I was very impressed with his car and driving. He was telling me that he wanted to start a band, and I had been thinking about it, too."

Each was impressed with the other's playing abilities, prompting Baker to ask Clapton to join his new, then-unnamed group. Clapton immediately agreed, on the condition that Baker hire Bruce, who had joined Manfred Mann since leaving Graham Bond, as the group's bassist; according to Clapton, Baker was so surprised at the suggestion that he almost crashed the car. Clapton had met Bruce when the bassist/vocalist briefly played with the Bluesbreakers in November 1965; the two also had recorded together as part of an ad hoc group dubbed Powerhouse (which also included Steve Winwood and Paul Jones). Impressed with Bruce's vocals and technical prowess, Clapton wanted to work with him on an ongoing basis.

In contrast, while Bruce was in Bond's band, Baker and he had been notorious for their quarrelling. Their volatile relationship included on-stage fights and the sabotage of one another's instruments. After Baker fired Bruce from the band, Bruce continued to arrive for gigs; ultimately, Bruce was driven away from the band after Baker threatened him at knifepoint.

Baker and Bruce tried to put aside their differences for the good of Baker's new trio, which he envisioned as collaborative, with each of the members contributing to music and lyrics. The band was named "Cream", as Clapton, Bruce, and Baker were already considered the "cream of the crop" among blues and jazz musicians in the exploding British music scene. Before deciding upon "Cream", the band considered calling themselves "Sweet 'n' Sour Rock 'n' Roll". Of the trio, Clapton had the biggest reputation in England; however, he was unknown in the United States, having left the Yardbirds before "For Your Love" hit the American Top Ten.

The band made their unofficial debut at the Twisted Wheel on 29 July 1966, with the official debut two nights later at the Sixth Annual Windsor Jazz and Blues Festival. Being new and with few original songs to their credit, they performed blues reworkings that thrilled the large crowd and earned them a warm reception. In October, the band also got a chance to jam with Jimi Hendrix, who had recently arrived in London. Hendrix was a fan of Clapton's music and wanted a chance to play with him onstage.

During the early organisation, they decided Bruce would serve as the group's lead vocalist. While Clapton was shy about singing, he occasionally harmonised with Bruce, and in time, took lead vocals on several Cream tracks, including "Four Until Late", "Strange Brew", "World of Pain", "Outside Woman Blues", "Crossroads", and "Badge".

=== Fresh Cream (1966) ===
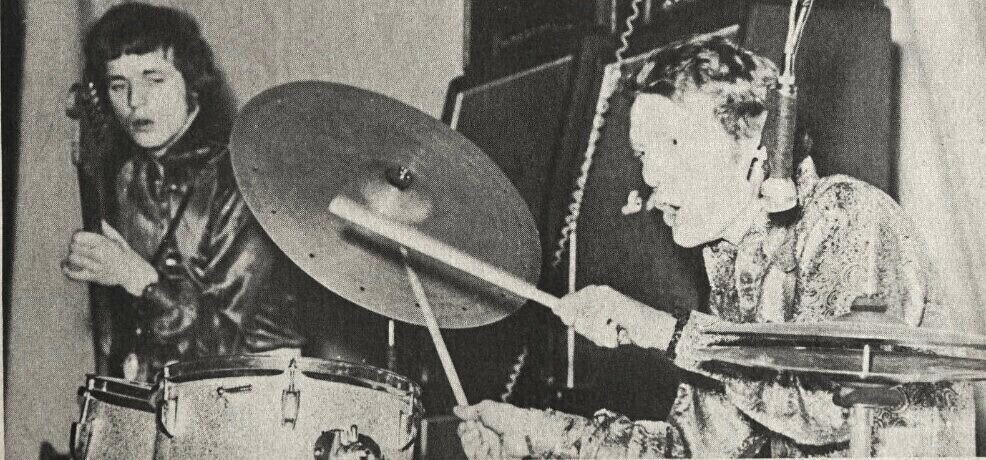
Bruce and Baker onstage c. 1967

The band's debut album, Fresh Cream, was recorded and released in 1966. The album reached number six in the UK charts and number 39 in the US. It was evenly split between self-penned originals and blues covers, including "Four Until Late", "Rollin' and Tumblin'", "Spoonful", "I'm So Glad", and "Cat's Squirrel". The rest of the songs were written by either Jack Bruce or Ginger Baker. ("I Feel Free", a UK hit single, was included on only the American edition of the LP.) The track "Toad" contained one of the earliest examples of a drum solo in rock music, as Baker expanded upon his early composition "Camels and Elephants", written in 1965 with the Graham Bond Organisation.

=== Disraeli Gears (1967) ===
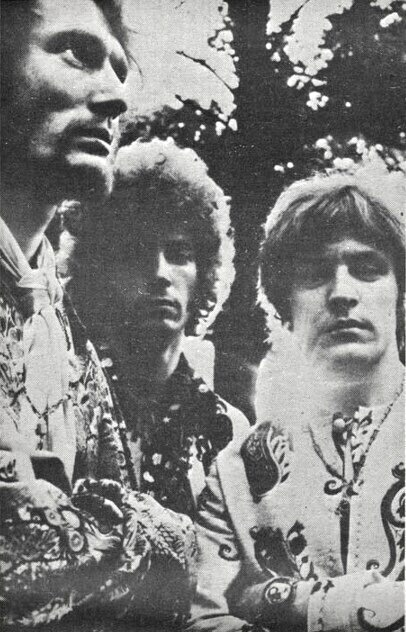
Cream, c. late 1967

The band first visited the US in March 1967 to play nine dates at the RKO 58th Street Theatre in New York City. Their impact was small, as impresario Murray the K placed them at the bottom of a six-act bill that performed three times per date, eventually reducing the band to one song per concert.

They returned to record Disraeli Gears in New York between 11 and 15 May 1967. This, the band's second album, was released in November 1967 and reached the top five in the charts on both sides of the Atlantic. Produced by Felix Pappalardi (who later co-founded the Cream-influenced hard rock band Mountain) and engineer Tom Dowd, it was recorded at Atlantic Studios in New York City.

Disraeli Gears is often considered to be the band's defining effort, successfully blending psychedelic British rock with American blues. It also included "Sunshine of Your Love", which became the group's highest-charting song, peaking at number five on the U.S. Billboard Hot 100. The album was originally slated for release in the summer of 1967, but the record label opted to scrap the planned cover and repackage it with a new psychedelic cover, designed by Australian artist Martin Sharp who also wrote the lyrics for "Tales of Brave Ulysees", and the resulting changes delayed its release for several months. The cover was remarkable for the time, with a psychedelic design patterned over a publicity photo of the trio.

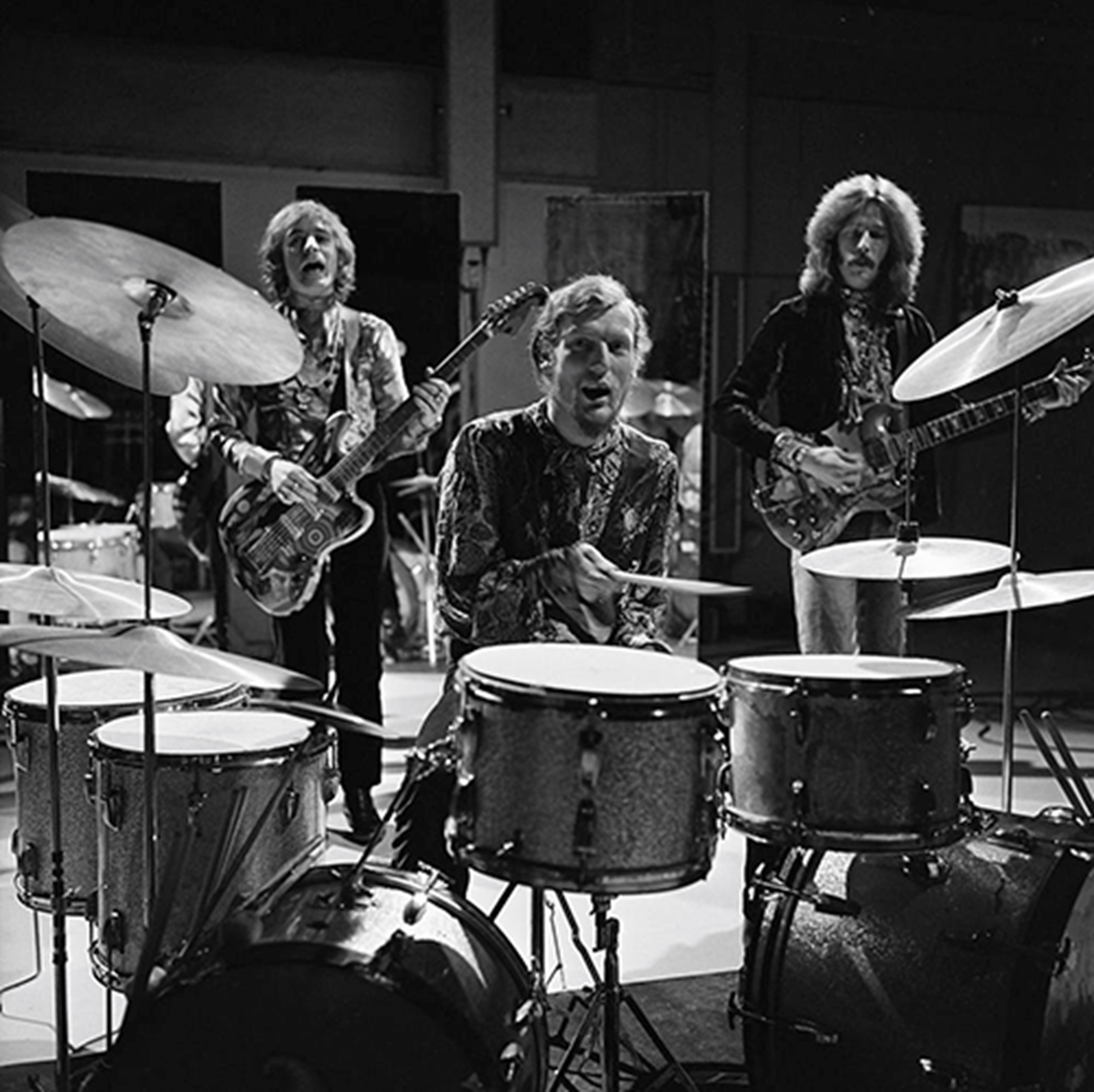
Cream performing on Dutch television in January 1968

In August 1967, the band played their first headlining dates in the US, first at The Fillmore in San Francisco and later at The Pinnacle in Los Angeles. The concerts were a great success and proved very influential on both the band itself and the flourishing hippie scene surrounding them. Upon discovering a growing listening audience, the band began to stretch out on stage, incorporating more time in their repertoire, some songs reaching jams of 20 minutes. Long, drawn-out jams in numbers like "Spoonful", "N.S.U.", "I'm So Glad", and "Sweet Wine" became live favourites, while songs like "Sunshine of Your Love", "Crossroads", and "Tales of Brave Ulysses" remained reasonably short.

=== Wheels of Fire (1968) ===
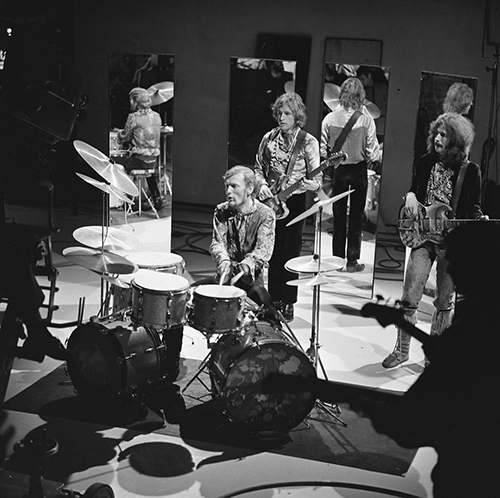
Cream performing in 1968

In 1968 came the band's third release, Wheels of Fire, which topped the American charts. The album was recorded in a spate of short sessions from July 1967 to June 1968. Still a relative novelty, the double album of two LP records was well-suited to extended solos. The psychedelic cover was again designed by Australian artist Martin Sharp. The Wheels of Fire studio recordings showcased the band moving away from the blues and more towards a semi-progressive rock style highlighted by odd time signatures and various orchestral instruments. However, the band did record Howlin' Wolf's "Sitting on Top of the World" and Albert King's "Born Under a Bad Sign". According to a BBC interview with Clapton, their record company, Atco Records, also handling Albert King, asked the band to cover "Born Under a Bad Sign", which became a popular track off the record. The opening song, "White Room", became a radio staple. Another song, "Politician", was written by the band while waiting to perform live at the BBC. The album's second disc included three live recordings from the Winterland Ballroom and one from the Fillmore. Clapton's second solo from "Crossroads" has made it to the top 20 in multiple "greatest guitar solo" lists.

After the completion of Wheels of Fire in mid-1968, the band members had grown tired of their exhausting touring schedule and increasingly loud jamming, and wanted to go their separate ways. Baker stated in a 2006 interview with Music Mart magazine, "It just got to the point where Eric said to me: 'I've had enough of this', and I said so have I. I couldn't stand it. The last year with Cream was just agony. It damaged my hearing permanently, and today I've still got a hearing problem because of the sheer volume throughout the last year of Cream. But it didn't start off like that. In 1966, it was great. It was really a wonderful experience musically, and it just went into the realms of stupidity." Bruce and Baker's combustible relationship proved even worse as a result of the strain put upon the band by nonstop touring, forcing Clapton to play the role of perpetual peacekeeper.

Clapton had also become interested in the music of Bob Dylan's former backing group, now known as the Band, and their debut album, Music from Big Pink, which proved to be a welcome breath of fresh air to Clapton in comparison to the psychedelia and volume that had defined Cream. Furthermore, he had read a scathing Cream review in Rolling Stone, a publication he had much admired, in which the reviewer, Jon Landau, called him a "master of the blues cliché". In the wake of that article, Clapton wanted to end Cream and pursue a different musical direction.

At the beginning of the band's farewell tour on 4 October 1968, in Oakland, California, nearly the entire set consisted of songs from Wheels of Fire: "White Room", "Politician", "Crossroads", "Spoonful", and "Deserted Cities of the Heart", with "Passing the Time" taking the place of "Toad" for a drum solo. "Passing the Time" and "Deserted Cities" were quickly removed from the setlist and replaced by "Sitting on Top of the World" and "Toad".

=== Goodbye and break-up (1968–1969) ===
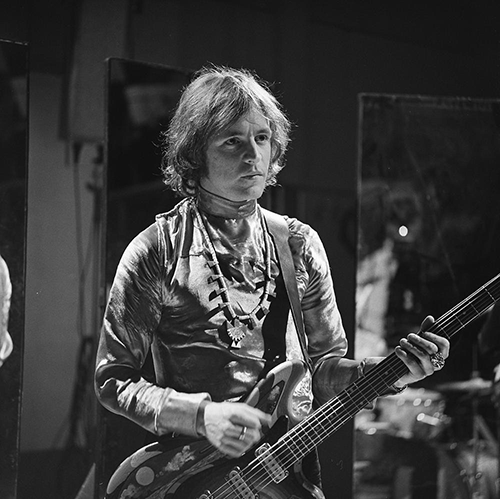
Jack Bruce performing on Dutch television in 1968

From its creation, Cream was faced with some fundamental problems that would later lead to its dissolution in November 1968. The antagonism between Bruce and Baker created tensions in the band. Clapton also felt that the members of the band did not listen to each other enough. Equipment during these years had also improved; new Marshall amplifier stacks produced more power, and Jack Bruce pushed the volume levels higher, creating tension for Baker, who would have trouble competing with roaring stacks. Clapton spoke of a concert during which he stopped playing and neither Baker nor Bruce noticed. Clapton has also commented that Cream's later gigs mainly consisted of its members showing off.

Cream decided that they would break up in May 1968 during a tour of the US. Later, in July, the band announced that they would break up after a farewell tour of the US and after playing two concerts in London. Jack Bruce was quoted as saying "Travel can kill a group. It becomes boring, tiring and very depressing."

Cream were eventually persuaded to do one final album, appropriately titled Goodbye. The album was recorded in late 1968 and released in early 1969, after the band had broken up. It comprised six songs, three live recordings dating from a concert at The Forum in Los Angeles on 19 October, and three new studio recordings (including "Badge", which was written by Clapton and George Harrison, who also played rhythm guitar and was credited as "L'Angelo Misterioso"). "I'm So Glad" was included among the live tracks.

Cream's farewell tour consisted of 22 shows at 19 venues in the US from 4 October to 4 November 1968, and two final farewell concerts at the Royal Albert Hall on 25 and 26 November 1968. The final US gig was at the Rhode Island Auditorium on 4 November. The band arrived late, and due to local restrictions, were able to perform only two songs, "Toad" and a 20+ minute version of "Spoonful". The two Royal Albert Hall concerts were filmed for a BBC documentary and released on video (and later DVD) as Farewell Concert. Both shows were sold out and attracted more attention than any other Cream concert, but their performance was regarded by many as below standard. Baker himself said of the concerts: "It wasn't a good gig ... Cream was better than that ... We knew it was all over. We knew we were just finishing it off, getting it over with." Bruce had three Marshall stacks on stage for the farewell shows, but one acted only as a spare, and he only used one or two, depending on the song. In an interview from Cream: Classic Artists, he added that the band was getting worse by the minute.

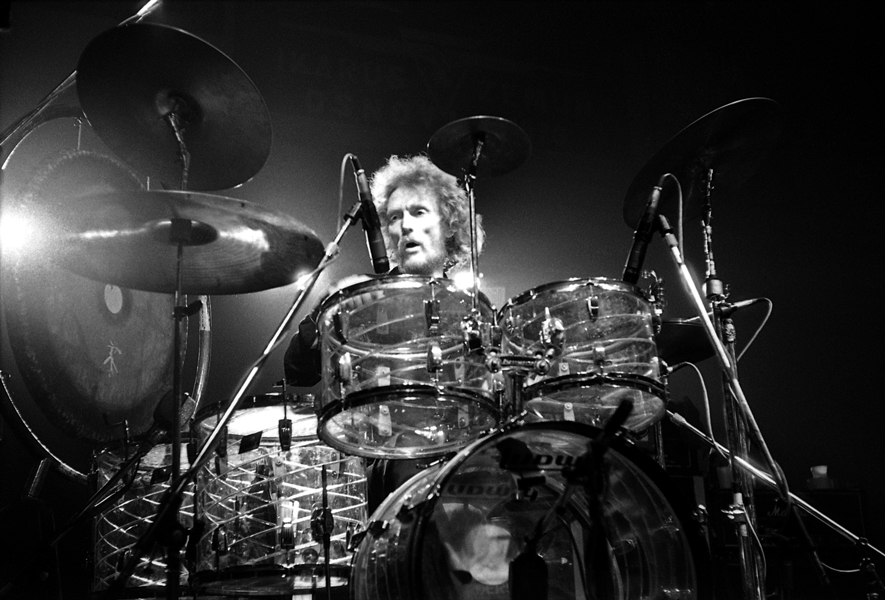
Ginger Baker at the drumkit

=== Post-Cream ===
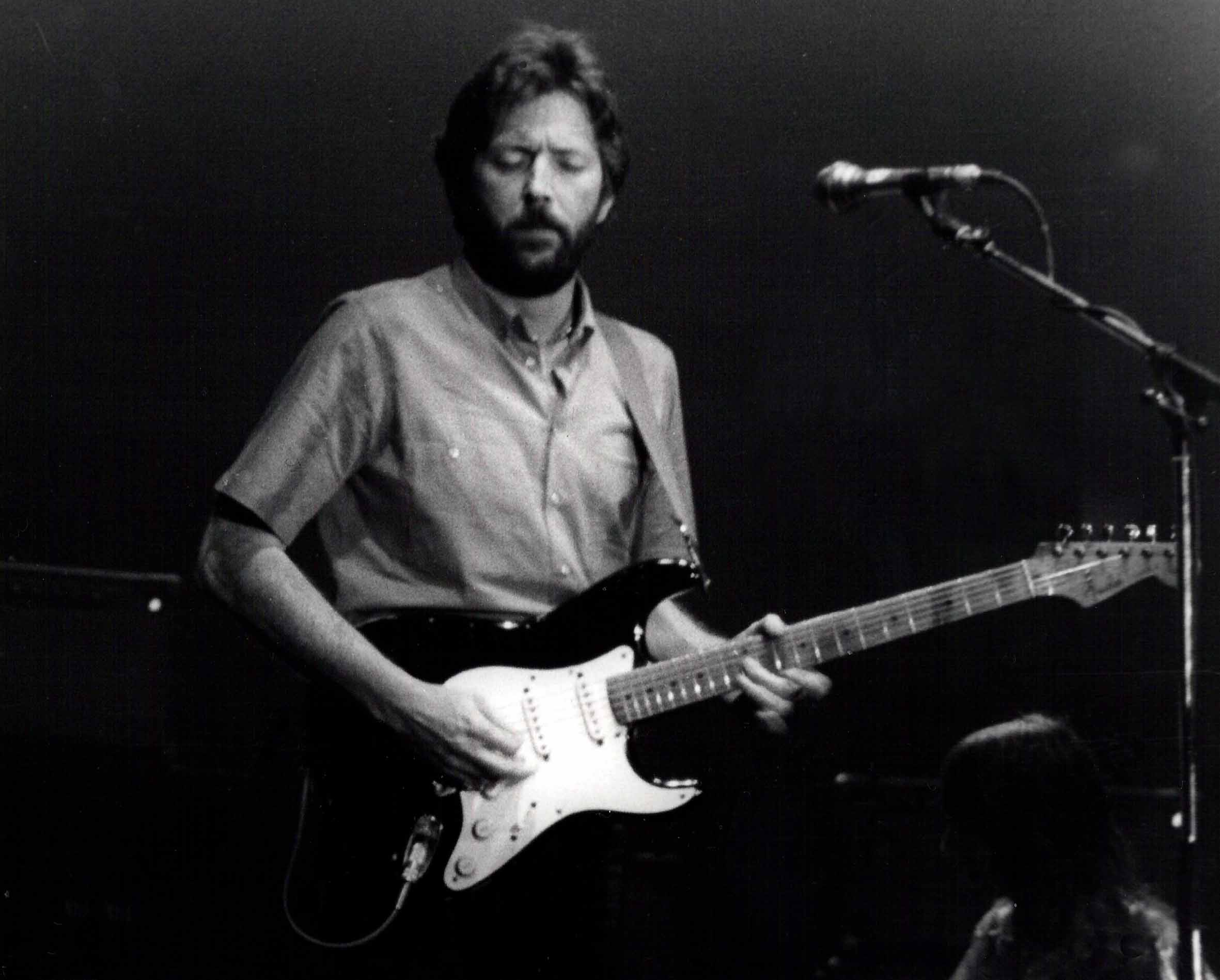
Eric Clapton performing in Barcelona in 1986

Blind Faith, a band that included both Clapton and Baker, was formed after the demise of Cream, following an attempt by Clapton to recruit Steve Winwood into Cream in the hope that he would help act as a buffer between Bruce and Baker. Inspired by more song-based acts, Clapton went on to perform very different, less improvisational material with Delaney and Bonnie, Derek and the Dominos, and in his own long and varied solo career.

Bruce began a varied and successful solo career with the 1969 release of Songs for a Tailor, while Baker formed a jazz-fusion ensemble, Ginger Baker's Air Force, from the remnants of Blind Faith, with Winwood, Blind Faith bassist Rick Grech, Graham Bond on saxophone, and guitarist Denny Laine of the Moody Blues and (later) Wings.

All three members continued to explore new musical ideas and partnerships, play concerts, and record music for over four decades after ending Cream.

=== Reunions ===
==== Rock and Roll Hall of Fame ====
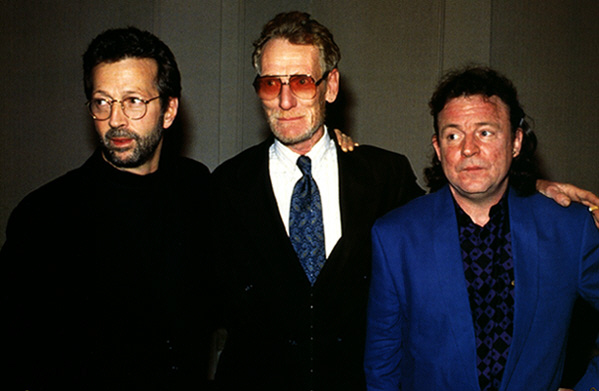
25 years after Cream's dissolution, the trio finally reunited at the 1993 Rock and Roll Hall of Fame induction ceremony.

In 1993, Cream were inducted into the Rock and Roll Hall of Fame and reformed to perform at the induction ceremony. Initially, the trio were wary about performing, until encouraging words from Robbie Robertson inspired them to try. The set consisted of "Sunshine of Your Love", "Crossroads", and "Born Under a Bad Sign", a song they had previously played live just three times. Clapton mentioned in his acceptance speech that their rehearsal the day before the ceremony had marked the first time they had played together in 25 years. This performance spurred rumours of a reunion tour. Bruce and Baker said in later interviews that they were, indeed, interested in touring as Cream. A formal reunion did not take place immediately, as Clapton, Bruce, and Baker continued to pursue solo projects, although the latter two worked together again in the mid-1990s as two-thirds of the power trio BBM with Irish blues rock guitarist Gary Moore.

==== 2005 concerts ====
At Clapton's request, Cream reunited for a series of four shows, on 2, 3, 5, and 6 May 2005 at the Royal Albert Hall in London, the venue of their final concerts in 1968. Although the three musicians chose not to speak publicly about the shows, Clapton would later state that he had become more "generous" in regard to his past, and that the physical health of Bruce and Baker was a major factor: Bruce had recently undergone a transplant for liver cancer in 2003, and had almost lost his life, while Baker had severe arthritis.

Tickets for all four shows sold out in under an hour. The performances were recorded for a live CD and DVD. Among those in attendance were Bill Wyman, Steve Winwood, Paul McCartney, Ringo Starr, Roger Waters, Brian May, Jimmy Page, and Mick Taylor. The reunion marked the first time the band had played "Badge" and "Pressed Rat and Warthog" live.

Inspired by the success of the reunion, the band agreed to an additional set of three shows at the Madison Square Garden in New York City, from 24 to 26 October 2005. According to Clapton, these concerts did not live up to the Royal Albert Hall performances, among other reasons, due to lack of rehearsal and the resurgence of old grudges among band members.

=== Post-2005 ===
In February 2006, Cream received a Grammy Lifetime Achievement Award in recognition of their contribution to, and influence upon, modern music. That same month, a Classic Albums DVD was released detailing the story behind the creation and recording of Disraeli Gears. On the day prior to the Grammy ceremony, Bruce made a public statement that more one-off performances of Cream had been planned - multiple dates in a few cities, similar to the Royal Albert Hall and Madison Square Garden shows.

However, this story was denied by both Clapton and Baker, first by Clapton in The Times in April 2006. When asked about Cream, Clapton said: "No. Not for me. We did it and it was fun. But life is too short. I've got lots of other things I would rather do, including staying at home with my kids. The thing about that band was that it was all to do with its limits ... it was an experiment." In an interview in the UK magazine Music Mart, about the release of a DVD about the Blind Faith concert in Hyde Park 1969, Baker commented about his unwillingness to continue the Cream reunion. These comments were far more specific and explosive than Clapton's, as they were centred on his relationship with Jack Bruce. Ginger said, "When he's Dr. Jekyll, he's fine ... It's when he's Mr. Hyde that he's not. And I'm afraid he's still the same. I tell you this – there won't ever be any more Cream gigs, because he did Mr. Hyde in New York last year."

When asked to elaborate, Baker replied:

Oh, he shouted at me on stage, he turned his bass up so loud that he deafened me on the first gig. What he does is that he apologises and apologises, but I'm afraid, to do it on a Cream reunion gig, that was the end. He killed the magic, and New York was like 1968 ... It was just a get through the gig, get the money sort of deal. I was absolutely amazed. I mean, he demonstrated why he got the sack from Graham Bond and why Cream didn't last very long on stage in New York. I didn't want to do it in the first place simply because of how Jack was. I have worked with him several times since Cream, and I promised myself that I would never work with him again. When Eric first came up with the idea, I said no, and then he phoned me up and eventually convinced me to do it. I was on my best behaviour and I did everything I could to make things go as smooth as possible, and I was really pleasant to Jack.

Bruce told Detroit's WCSX radio station in May 2007 that there were plans for a Cream reunion later in the year. It was later revealed that the potential performance was to be November 2007 in London as a tribute to Ahmet Ertegun. The band decided against it and this was confirmed by Bruce in a letter to the editor of the Jack Bruce fanzine, The Cuicoland Express, dated 26 September 2007:

Dear Marc,
We were going to do this tribute concert for Ahmet when it was to be at the Royal Albert Hall but decided to pass when it was moved to the O2 Arena and seemed to be becoming overly commercial.

The headlining act for the O2 Arena Ahmet Ertegun Tribute Concert (postponed to December 2007) turned out to be from another reunited English hard-rock act, Led Zeppelin. Baker and Bruce appeared on stage in London in December 2008, when Baker was awarded a lifetime achievement award by legendary cymbal manufacturer Zildjian. In an interview with BBC 6 Music in April 2010, Bruce confirmed that there would be no more Cream shows, stating simply, "Cream is over." Bruce died on 25 October 2014 and Baker died on 6 October 2019, leaving Clapton as the last surviving member.

== Style and legacy ==
The members of Cream were described by Richie Unterberger of AllMusic as "[yearning] to break free of the confines of the standard rock/R&B/blues group". He described the band's first album Fresh Cream as "electrified and amped-up traditional blues", and described the band's second album Disraeli Gears as "invigorating, sometimes beguiling hard-driving psychedelic pop" that used "expected, crunching" guitar riffs. According to Hugh of Classic Rock, "Cream pioneered a fusion of rock, blues and jazz that directly influenced an entire generation of musicians and therefore the course of rock music over the next decade. And the legacy continues to filter down." He also assessed, "Before Cream [formed] in 1966, most British pop music stuck pretty rigidly to a verse/ chorus format, and any instrumental solo was generally confined to repeating the melody. Cream changed all that. [...] They took the two-note riff that comprised Willie Dixon’s Spoonful and stretched it from two-and-a-half minutes to six-and-a-half, exaggerated it, and improvised all around it with a dazzling display of virtuoso playing." Baker and Bruce’s styles were rooted in jazz, while Clapton brought a blues background to the fore. Fielder wrote, "Clapton may not have had the musical knowledge and technique that Baker and Bruce possessed, but he had a God-given gift that enabled the group to justify their audacious name."

Jim Sullivan of NPR conferred the titles of "rock’s most legendary power trio" and "arguably [rock music's] first supergroup" on Cream.

== Personnel ==
Band members

- Ginger Baker – drums, percussion, backing and lead vocals (died 2019)
- Jack Bruce – lead and backing vocals, bass guitar, keyboards, piano, harmonica, cello, acoustic guitar, recorder (died 2014)
- Eric Clapton – lead and rhythm guitars, lead and backing vocals

Session contributors

- Pete Brown – lyrics, co-songwriter (1966–1969; died 2023)
- Felix Pappalardi – production, viola, bells, organ, trumpet, tonette, mellotron, piano, bass (1967–1969; died 1983)
- Mike Taylor – co-songwriter (1968; died 1969)
- George Harrison – rhythm guitar, co-songwriter (1968; died 2001)

== Discography ==
- Fresh Cream (1966)
- Disraeli Gears (1967)
- Wheels of Fire (1968)
- Goodbye (1969)

== See also ==
- Album era
