= Qu'est-ce qu'on fait maintenant? =

1991 single by Benny B

Single by Benny B feat. DJ Daddy K

from the album L'Album
- B-side: "Hip hop version"
- Released: November 1990
- Recorded: 1990
- Genre: Hip hop, electronic
- Length: 4:01
- Label: Private Life, On the Beach
- Songwriters: Vito Lucente, Alain Deproost, Amid Gharbaoui, Richard Quyssens

Benny B feat. DJ Daddy K singles chronology
"Vous êtes fous !" (1990)	"Qu'est-ce qu'on fait maintenant?" (1990)	"Dis-moi bébé" (1991)

"Qu'est-ce qu'on fait maintenant?" (Note: French for "What Are We Doing Now?") is a 1990 song recorded by Belgian hip hop act Benny B, with DJ Daddy K also credited on the single's cover. Released in November 1990, it was the second single from Benny B's first album, L'Album. It became a hit in France and Belgium (Wallonia), becoming a top two hit in both countries.

== Background and writing ==
"Qu'est-ce qu'on fait maintenant?" was written and the music composed by Vito Lucente, Alain Deproost, Amid Gharbaoui and R. Quyssens. It uses samples of Tarzan's cry as leitmotif in the refrain, the same as that in Coldcut's "Stop This Crazy Thing".

== Chart performance ==
In France, "Qu'est-ce qu'on fait maintenant?" debuted at number 28 on the chart edition of 8 December 1990, reached the top ten five weeks later and peaked at number two for a sole week in its eighth week. It remained for 18 consecutive weeks in the top ten, then dropped quickly, and totalled 27 weeks in top 50. It achieved Gold disc, awarded by the Syndicat National de l'Édition Phonographique for 500,000 units. It was also successful in Belgium (Wallonia), reaching number two for non consecutive three weeks, on 15, 22 December 1990 and 23 February 1991, and stayed for a total of 14 weeks in the top ten. In Flanders, it charted for 11 weeks, with a peak at number 32.

On the European Hot 100 Singles compiled by Music & Media, "Qu'est-ce qu'on fait maintenant?" entered the chart at number 85 on 8 December 1990, reached a peak of number ten in its ninth and its eleventh weeks, and fell off the chart straight from number 45 after 25 weeks of presence. It ranked at number 40 on the year-end chart.

== Track listings ==
- 7" single - France, Belgium, Netherlands
1. "Qu'est-ce qu'on fait maintenant ?" (techno version) - 4:01
2. "Qu'est-ce qu'on fait maintenant ?" (hip hop version) - 3:42
- 12" maxi - France
1. "Qu'est-ce qu'on fait maintenant ?" (full techno edit) - 5:20
2. "Vous êtes fous !" (US mix) - 4:40
3. "Qu'est-ce qu'on fait maintenant ?" (club mix) - 6:01
4. "Qu'est-ce qu'on fait maintenant ?" (a cappella) - 1:12
5. "Qu'est-ce qu'on fait maintenant ?" (hip hop mix) - 3:42
- 12" maxi - Belgium
1. "Qu'est-ce qu'on fait maintenant ?" (full techno edit) - 5:20
2. "Qu'est-ce qu'on fait maintenant ?" (hip hop mix) - 3:42
3. "Qu'est-ce qu'on fait maintenant ?" (club mix) - 6:01
4. "Qu'est-ce qu'on fait maintenant ?" (a cappella) - 1:12
5. "Qu'est-ce qu'on fait maintenant ?" (radio edit) - 4:01
6. "Scratch Effects"
- CD maxi - France
1. "Qu'est-ce qu'on fait maintenant ?" (radio edit) - 4:01
2. "Qu'est-ce qu'on fait maintenant ?" (full techno edit) - 5:20
3. "Qu'est-ce qu'on fait maintenant ?" (club mix) - 6:01
4. "Qu'est-ce qu'on fait maintenant ?" (hip hop mix) - 3:42
5. "Qu'est-ce qu'on fait maintenant ?" (a cappella) - 1:12
6. "Vous êtes fous !" (US mix) - 4:40
- 12" maxi - Remixes - France
1. "Qu'est-ce qu'on fait maintenant ?" (club remix) - 6:35
2. "Qu'est-ce qu'on fait maintenant ?" (single remix) - 3:48
3. "Medley mix ("Vous êtes fous !"/"Qu'est-ce qu'on fait maintenant ?") - 7:00
4. "Qu'est-ce qu'on fait maintenant ?" (hip hop remix) - 4:01
- CD maxi - Remixes - France
1. "Qu'est-ce qu'on fait maintenant ?" (club remix) - 6:35
2. "Qu'est-ce qu'on fait maintenant ?" (single remix) - 3:48
3. "Medley mix ("Vous êtes fous !"/"Qu'est-ce qu'on fait maintenant ?") - 7:00
4. "Qu'est-ce qu'on fait maintenant ?" (hip hop remix) - 4:01

== Personnel ==
- Artwork – dIP Design
- Featuring – DJ Daddy K
- Photography – Stephan Streker

== Charts ==
=== Weekly charts ===
Weekly chart performance for "Qu'est-ce qu'on fait maintenant ?"
Chart (1990–1991)	Peak position
Belgium (Ultratop 50 Flanders)	32
Belgium (Ultratop 50 Wallonia)	2
Europe (European Hot 100)	10
France (SNEP)	2

=== Year-end charts ===
Year-end chart performance for "Qu'est-ce qu'on fait maintenant ?"
Chart (1991)	Position
Europe (Eurochart Hot 100)	40

=== Certifications ===
Certifications for "Qu'est-ce qu'on fait maintenant ?"
Region	Certification	Certified units/sales
France (SNEP)	Gold	400,000^{*}
^{*} Sales figures based on certification alone.

== Release history ==
Country	Date	Format	Label
France	1990	CD maxi	On the Beach
France	1990	7" single	On the Beach
France	1990	12" maxi	On the Beach
France	1991	CD maxi - remixes	On the Beach
France	1991	12" maxi - remixes	On the Beach
Belgium	1990	7" single	Private Life
Belgium	1990	12" maxi	Private Life
Netherlands	1990	7"single	Columbia
