= Back Door Slam =

Blues rock band

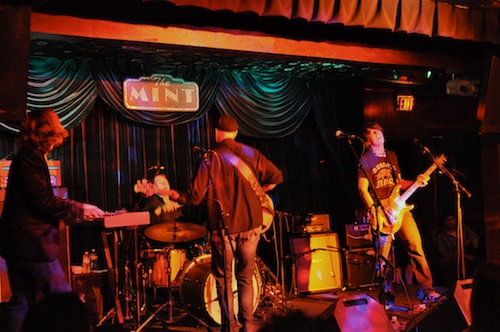
- Live in concert, 2009

Background information
- Origin: Isle of Man
- Genres: Blues rock, indie rock
- Years active: 2003–2009
- Labels: Blix
- Members: Davy Knowles (vocals, guitar, mandolin); Steven Barci (drums); PK (bass)
- Past members: Adam Jones (bass); Ross Doyle (drums); Jamie Armstrong (bass); Brian Garvey (rhythm guitar); Josh Harmon (guitar)
- Website: http://www.backdoorslam.com/ (defunct)

Back Door Slam is a blues rock band started by Davy Knowles on the Isle of Man in 2003–04. The band got its name from a Robert Cray song of the same name. Originally a four-piece, with Castle Rushen High School friends Jamie Armstrong (bass guitar), Ross Doyle (drums) and Brian Garvey (rhythm guitar), the band was torn apart in 2004 when Garvey was killed in a car accident along with their close friend Richie Brookes.

Deciding to carry on in Garvey's memory, Knowles, Armstrong, and Doyle reformed the band, with Knowles writing an emotional tribute to his friend and former bandmate, "Stay", which appeared on an EP and on their debut album, Roll Away. The trio recorded two EPs together, and played hundreds of gigs on their native Isle of Man before moving to London to live with Knowles's manager, Bob Miller (Corinne Bailey Rae, Christine Collister). After a handful of gigs in the UK, Armstrong decided to pursue a career in music production and left the band to go to university.

In 2007, with a spot secured at the SXSW Festival in Texas, Knowles and Doyle recruited former schoolmate Adam Jones to replace Jamie on bass. Jones joined Back Door Slam for what turned out to be two extensive tours of the US lasting until January 2009.

The band's first and fourth albums, Roll Away and Coming Up for Air, peaked on Billboard's Blues Albums chart at No. 3 and No. 2 respectively.

== Career ==
=== Debut album ===
The band in this classic lineup, with Ross Doyle on drums and Adam Jones on bass, released their debut album, Roll Away, on 18 June 2007 in the Isle of Man, with a 1 July release date in North America. The 10-song disc (plus 1 bonus track) includes live favourites "Come Home" and "Too Late", along with evocative love song "Too Good For Me", newie "It'll All Come Around" and one cover: 1920s blues rocker "Outside Woman Blues" (originally by Blind Joe Reynolds but most famously covered by Cream on their album Disraeli Gears). The album was produced by Dave Armstrong of Running Media/DAM Productions.

=== Tour ===
Following their performance at SXSW 2007, the band played 310 dates in support of their album Roll Away. The tour included support slots with Rusted Root, REO Speedwagon, Styx, Eric Burdon, Kid Rock, and Lynyrd Skynyrd with hundreds of gigs and festivals (Lollapalooza, Download Festival, Wakarusa, Austin City Limits Festival and Bonnaroo). A live album was released of their performance at Bonnaroo. The band also toured with longtime jam-band favorites Gov't Mule.

=== Breakup ===
On 27 January 2009, a letter was posted on Back Door Slam's website, announcing that the band had "broken up" and its members were pursuing different musical endeavors.

== Davy Knowles and Back Door Slam ==
Knowles joined Jeff Beck as solo opening act for dates of his US tour in early 2009. He then recorded a new album, Coming Up for Air, with Peter Frampton as co-producer (also adding guitar and backing vocals, and co-writing two songs), along with Benmont Tench (keys), Mauricio Fritz Lewak (drums) and Kevin McCormick (bass), which was released in June 2009. He is now on the road as Davy Knowles and Back Door Slam, with PK (bass), Steven Barci (drums) and Ty Bailie (keys). They opened for Chickenfoot in August/Sept 2009. In June 2009, Chickenfoot guitarist Joe Satriani described Davy as his "new favourite modern-day bluesman" in a Playlist article in The Sunday Times.

The Outsider, Knowles' solo album, was released in March 2015.

== Discography ==
- Roll Away (2007)
- Back Door Slam – EP (2008)
- Back Door Slam: Live from Bonnaroo (2009)
- Coming Up for Air (2009)
