= Davy Knowles =

Manx blues guitarist and singer

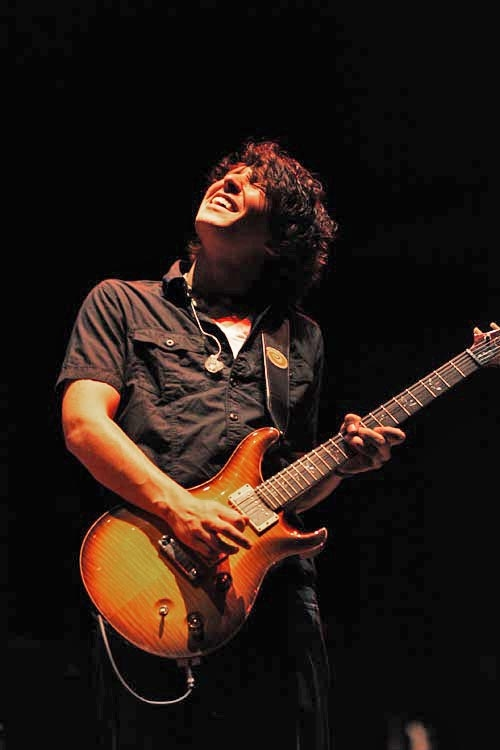

Background information
- Born: 30 April 1987 (age 38); Port St Mary, Isle of Man
- Genres: Blues rock, Celtic rock
- Occupations: Guitarist, singer
- Instruments: Guitar, mandola
- Years active: 2007–present
- Labels: Provogue Records, Blix Street Records, Rogue Island Entertainment
- Website: http://www.davyknowles.com/

Davy Knowles (born 30 April 1987) is a Manx blues guitarist and singer. Knowles currently tours as a solo artist, but is formerly of the blues-rock band Back Door Slam, as well as working under the name Davy Knowles and Back Door Slam for a short period of time. With Back Door Slam, he played lead guitar and sang on their debut album, Roll Away. After a split-up with bassist Adam Jones and drummer Ross Doyle, Knowles released the first and only album under the name Davy Knowles and Back Door Slam, Coming Up for Air, on 19 May 2009. Knowles drew his musical influences from blues musicians that he grew up listening to such as Rory Gallagher, Dire Straits, Peter Green, and Cream. Due to his home country's proximity to Ireland, Knowles has stated that his music also is influenced by the Celtic genre, which is noted to be present in the song "Roll Away". In April 2009, Knowles opened for British guitarist Jeff Beck on his American tour. He toured with Joe Satriani and Chickenfoot in the United States through December 2009. Davy Knowles toured with The Rhythm Devils in 2010.

Knowles released his first solo album, The Outsider, in 2014. He released his second solo album, Three Miles From Avalon, in 2016, while his third, What Happens Next, was issued in October 2021. He is currently based in Chicago, and continues to tour in the United States regularly.

== Early life ==
Knowles was born in Port St Mary, Isle of Man. At age 11, Knowles first became interested in music when he heard Dire Straits's "Sultans of Swing" during a car ride with his father. Promptly, he took his father's guitar and learned how to play the song by ear. As Knowles grew older, he was influenced by other artists like Dire Straits that he found in his father's music collection such as Rory Gallagher, Eric Clapton, and Robert Johnson.

As a child, Knowles briefly took guitar lessons, but did not prefer the traditional way of learning how to play. After he stopped taking lessons he taught himself. Knowles attended Castle Rushen High School in Castletown, Isle of Man, where he met future bandmates Brian Garvey, Ross Doyle, Adam Jones, and Jamie Armstrong.

== Musical career ==
=== Back Door Slam ===
Back Door Slam is the name of the blues rock band started by Davy Knowles on the Isle of Man in 2003/4. The band got its name from a Robert Cray song of the same name. Originally a four piece, with Castle Rushen High School friends Jamie Armstrong (bass guitar), Ross Doyle (drums) and Brian Garvey (rhythm guitar), the band was torn apart in 2004 when Brian was killed in a car accident along with their close friend Richie Brookes.

Deciding to carry on in Brian's memory, Davy, Jamie and Ross reformed the band, with Davy writing the emotional tribute to his friend & former bandmate, 'Stay', which was later to appear on a rare EP and on their debut album Roll Away. The band originally played only local shows around their hometown area of Port St. Mary. Shortly after, Armstrong quit the band to attend college in England, so Knowles brought in bassist and high school friend Adam Jones to replace him. In 2006, the band began to write their first record, with Knowles writing every song on the album with the exception of their cover of Blind Joe Reynolds' "Outside Woman Blues". On 26 June 2007, Knowles and Back Door Slam released their debut album, Roll Away. Knowles played lead guitar (both electric and acoustic) and sang the lead throughout the whole album.

In 2008, after their first album released and was at number 7 on the Blues Billboard Chart, Knowles and Back Door Slam gained exposure at the South by Southwest Festival, Coachella, and Lollapalooza. At the Bonnaroo Music Festival in Manchester, Tennessee, Knowles and the band shot their first concert DVD, Back Door Slam: Live from Bonnaroo.

Early in 2009, Knowles unexpectedly released a statement from the band, stating that they had split up, and each of the band's members were going to begin to pursue their own separate careers in music. "After much thought and soul searching, we have reached the painful decision that we should part ways at this time," said Knowles in a statement on the band's website. "The decision was the hardest of our lives, but it's one we believe had to be made for each of us to move forward creatively and musically," he added.

=== Solo career ===
After the breakup with Back Door Slam, Knowles quickly began his solo career under the name "Davy Knowles and Back Door Slam". His new backing band contained Fritz Lewak at drums, Kevin McCormick at bass, and Benmont Tench of the Heartbreakers at keyboards. Knowles said in an interview that he had got much stronger and comfortable with singing and songwriting during the time that he began to write his first solo album. On 16 June 2009, Knowles released his first solo album, entitled Coming Up For Air. This new album became quite popular among blues listeners, as it rose to number 2 on the Billboard Blues Albums Chart on two separate occasions, on 11–25 July 2009.

After the release of his new album, Knowles went on tour, playing at several music festivals including the Mile High Festival, Rothbury Festival, Lollapalooza, and Summerfest, where he opened for Buddy Guy. In December 2009, Knowles performed the song "Come Home", at BETA Records TV Studios in Hollywood, California. The acoustic song segment is taken from Season 3 of the BETA Records Music television series, directed by Eric MacIver and produced by Chris Honetschlaege. He was touring as Davy Knowles and Back Door Slam, with PK (bass), Steven Barci (drums) and Ty Bailie (keys). They opened for Chickenfoot in August and September 2009. In June 2009, Chickenfoot guitarist Joe Satriani described Knowles as his "new favourite modern-day bluesman" in a Playlist article in The Sunday Times. He was on tour with The Rhythm Devils.

Knowles continued to tour in support of the new album before turning his attention to documenting his musical influences in the documentary Island Bound, which was released as part of the Isle of Man Film Festival in 2014.

Knowles also released his second solo album, The Outsider in 2014. The album featured two singles and lyric videos that Knowles released to his YouTube channel. One was the title track and the other was a cover of the gospel song "Ain't No Grave". The album also features a cover of the Woody Guthrie song, "Pastures of Plenty".

While touring in support of The Outsider in 2015 and early 2016, Knowles wrote and recorded his third solo album, Three Miles From Avalon. The album featured seven original songs as well as a reworking of the Willie Dixon song "What in the World". The album was released in October 2016, and reached number 5 in the Billboard Blues Albums Chart in its first week of release.

In 2017, Knowles joined Band Of Friends, celebrating the music Rory Gallagher, with original Gallagher bandmates Gerry McAvoy (bass) and Ted McKenna (drums). He toured with the group throughout 2017 and 2018.

On February 19, 2020, it was announced that Knowles had signed to Dutch-based record label Provogue Records. His latest studio album, entitled What Happens Next, was announced alongside the lead single "Light Of The Moon" on 29 July 2021, with the record released on 22 October. The single "Roll Me" was chosen by Spotify as one of the best blues songs of the year.

== Influences ==
"We were only 50 or 60 miles off the coast of Ireland. So I had this big Celtic influence growing up. And when I heard him incorporating that into his music, that's when I really got into it."

— Davy Knowles, 2008

According to Knowles, the first band that influenced him was Dire Straits, whose song "Sultans of Swing" inspired him to begin playing the guitar after hearing it played in his father's car stereo. Because he was brought up in the Isle of Man, Knowles has publicly stated that, he draws a great deal of influence from the Celtic genre of music, particularly from the Irish guitarist Rory Gallagher. "Rory Gallagher understood Celtic influences, being an Irishman, and I saw that where I was growing up, too. We were only 50 or 60 miles off the coast of Ireland. So I had this big Celtic influence growing up. And when I heard him incorporating that into his music, that's when I really got into it," said Knowles in an interview with the Seattle P.I.

== Equipment ==
Knowles uses a number of different guitars while on stage. His primary electric guitar until mid-2009 was the 1962 Fender Stratocaster Reissue, which he uses with Fender's SCN Samarium Cobalt Noiseless Stratocaster pickups. Knowles's other electric guitars are the Stevie Ray Vaughan Model Fender Stratocaster and Rio Grande brand pickups. Knowles uses the reissued Fender Mustang, which is only currently available in Japan. Knowles has one acoustic guitar that is used when he performs, a Gibson J-45 Acoustic. Along with these guitars, Knowles also uses Dean Markley guitar strings, ranging from 0.10 to 0.52 gauge. In mid-2009, Knowles began primarily using Paul Reed Smith guitars and Budda Amps while onstage. Knowles now uses PRS guitars, particularly the PRS 305.

Knowles has two amplifiers for use with his guitars. The first is the Vox AC30 Heritage Collection Amp, and the other is the 1965 Fender Twin Reverb. For his effects, Knowles uses the Dunlop Cry Baby for his Wah pedal, and the Fulltone Distortion Pro for his distortion and a Behringer kazoo. Davy Knowles now uses the Freekish Blues Freek Out! (a Highly Modified Joyo Voodoo Octave) for fuzz. In addition to this, Knowles occasionally plays a 1944 Martin brand mandolin and a Dallas Arbiter electric Fuzz Face in some of his songs.

== Discography ==
with Back Door Slam

- Roll Away (Blix Street Records, 2007)
- Coming Up for Air (Blix Street Records, 2009)

as Davy Knowles

- The Outsider (WYAN 2014)
- Three Miles from Avalon (WYAN 2016)
- 1932 EP (WYAN 2017)
- What Happens Next (Provogue Records 2021)
- If I Should Wander (WYAN 2023)
- The Invisible Man (WYAN 2024)

with MKO

- MKO (WYAN, 2025)
