= Bleeding Heart (album) =

Unofficial album of 1968 jam with Jimi Hendrix, Jim Morrison, and others

Live album (unofficial) by Jimi Hendrix
- Released: 1994
- Recorded: 1968
- Venue: The Scene, New York City
- Genre: Rock; lo-fi
- Length: 53:46
- Label: Various

Bleeding Heart is one of several names given to albums of a 1968 jam session with Jimi Hendrix, Jim Morrison, and others. The albums were fashioned from an informal two-track tape recording made by Hendrix which was subsequently stolen from his apartment. The jam took place at the Scene, a nightclub in New York City, and various dates and participants have been suggested. Although it presents a unique setting, critics and biographers have generally found fault with the sound quality and Morrison's performance.

== Background ==
To relieve the pressures of touring and recording, Jimi Hendrix frequently jammed with musicians at local clubs. He was also a tape-recording enthusiast and traveled with his Sony two-track reel-to-reel recorder. Hendrix recorded several after-hours jams in New York for his personal use, around the time that he began recording material for the Electric Ladyland album at the Record Plant studio. Some of these include jams at the Cafe Au Go Go on March 17, 1968, with members of the Paul Butterfield Blues Band (Elvin Bishop, Phillip Wilson) and the Electric Flag (Harvey Brooks, Buddy Miles) and the Generation Club on April 15, 1968, with B.B. King, Bishop, Wilson, Buzzy Feiten, and Al Kooper. Partly because of its proximity to the Record Plant, Hendrix frequently jammed at the Scene club, which was owned by Steve Paul, the McCoys and later Johnny Winter's manager.

== Recording ==
Several dates have been mentioned for the Scene club jam, including March 7, March 13, and June 6, 1968. In addition to Hendrix and Morrison, other jam participants have been tentatively identified as the Scene's house band, the McCoys (bassist Randy Jo Hobbs and drummer Randy Zehringer), bassist Harvey Brooks, and drummer Buddy Miles. Most albums list guitarist Johnny Winter, who occasionally jammed with Hendrix, although he emphatically denied ever having met or performed with Jim Morrison or being in New York at the time. The McCoy's Rick Derringer has also been suggested as the other guitarist. (Note: The Jimi Hendrix Experience bassist Noel Redding and drummer Mitch Mitchell have also been mentioned as participants.) The harmonica player has not been identified – at times Morrison is singing while the harmonica plays, which suggests a sixth participant. (Note: On March 13, Hendrix recorded at the Record Plant with harmonica player Paul Caruso.)

Jimi Hendrix plays guitar on all of the songs and sings two. It is notable that Hendrix's guitar is tuned down a whole step to D tuning (D-G-C-F-A-D) for this session. His version of his slow blues "Red House" has been singled out as the session highlight, which uses an uptempo arrangement similar to that of Cream's rendition of "Crossroads". (Note: On March 4, Hendrix jammed with Cream's Eric Clapton at the Scene. On March 10, Cream recorded the version of "Crossroads" that was released on Wheels of Fire.) Hendrix and the second guitarist trade guitar parts, with backing by bass and drums (Morrison and harmonica are not audible on the track). Except for part of the Elmore James slow blues "Bleeding Heart", the remainder of the jam is disjointed and includes rambling harmonica accompaniment and "Morrison's drunken hollering". Snippets of instrumental passages and ad-libbed lyrics have led the album's producers to give the tracks names, such as "Tomorrow Never Knows", "Outside Woman Blues", "If You Wake Up This Morning (And Found Yourself Dead)", "Uranus Rock", etc., although these are brief jam themes and not actual songs.

== Releases ==
Before and especially after Hendrix's death in 1970, many of his personal belongings were stolen. These included many of his home tape recordings. Although they were not intended for public release, some recordings have been issued many times on numerous albums, usually by small record labels that specialize in bootleg and gray market albums. The Scene club jam was first issued in 1972 with the title Sky High by Skydog Records. Nutmeg Records released it in 1978 as High, Live 'n Dirty with a prominent "X Rated" on the front.

In 1980, the album was issued as Woke Up This Morning and Found Myself Dead on the Red Lightnin' label. The album's liner notes state that the tapes of the jam were the property of Mick Cox, guitarist for Eire Apparent, who Hendrix later produced, and imply that it is the first legitimate release of the album. The now-defunct Castle Communications issued it as Bleeding Heart in 1994, also making claims. However, Hendrix biographer Keith Shadwick only indicates that the tape had been stolen. Other releases include such titles as Jamming Live at the Scene Club, NYC, NYC '68, Live at the Scene Club, N.Y., N.Y., Tomorrow Never Knows, Sunshine of Your Love, etc.

== Critical reception ==
Professional ratings
Review scores
Source	Rating
AllMusic — High Live & Dirty	3/5 stars
AllMusic — Woke Up This Morning and Found Myself Dead	3/5 stars
AllMusic — Jamming Live at the Scene Club, NYC	2/5 stars
AllMusic — NYC '68	1.5/5 stars

In a posthumous assessment, AllMusic has reviews for four different iterations of the Scene club jam album, which more or less include the same material, although some with different names and sequencing. The ratings range from three (out of five stars) to one and a half stars. The albums have been described as "exceedingly lo-fi", "interesting because it records for posterity two '60s icons on stage and the ensuing hilarity", and "a horribly drunken, obscenity-spewing Jim Morrison only makes the experience that much more unpleasant".

While one reviewer noted the album was "mandatory for completists, Hendrix fanatics and historians", others conclude "nothing on this LP can be considered essential" and "it sheds absolutely no new light on the guitarist's enduring legend". Biographer Shadwick wrote:

As a private tape in a musician's own collection it would have had its point, but as a commercially available record of an informal night's worth of music-making it has serious aesthetic problems. Hendrix doubtless would have been appalled by the tape's release and subsequent exploitation.

== Track listing ==
Most of the releases use the following track names in the following order:

No.	Title	Writer(s)	Length
1.	"Red House"	Jimi Hendrix	10:57
2.	"Woke Up This Morning and Found Myself Dead"		8:05
3.	"Bleeding Heart"	Elmore James	12:29
4.	"Morrison's Lament"		3:30
5.	"Tomorrow Never Knows"	John Lennon, Paul McCartney	5:11
6.	"Uranus Rock"		3:11
7.	"Outside Woman Blues"	Blind Joe Reynolds	8:03
8.	"Sunshine of Your Love"	Jack Bruce, Eric Clapton, Pete Brown	2:16

== Sources ==
- Brown, Tony (1992). Jimi Hendrix: A Visual Documentary — His Life, Loves, and Music. Omnibus Press. ISBN 0-7119-2761-8.
- Cox, John. Blues at Midnight (CD liner notes). Jimi Hendrix. Rock of Ages. ROA 1004.
- Fairchild, Michael J. (1994). Jimi Hendrix: Blues (CD liner notes). Jimi Hendrix. MCA Records. MCAD-11060.
- Glebbeck, Cesar (November 1991). "Johnny Winter Interview". UniVibes. No. 4.
- Henderson, David (1981). 'Scuse Me While I Kiss the Sky: The Life of Jimi Hendrix. Bantam. ISBN 0-553-01334-3.
- McDermott, John; Kramer, Eddie; Cox, Billy (2009). Ultimate Hendrix. Backbeat Books. ISBN 978-0-87930-938-1.
- Murray, Charles Shaar (1991). Crosstown Traffic. St. Martin's Press. ISBN 0-312-06324-5.
- Shadwick, Keith (2003). Jimi Hendrix: Musician. Backbeat Books. ISBN 0-87930-764-1.
- Shapiro, Harry; Glebbeek, Cesar (1990). Jimi Hendrix: Electric Gypsy. St. Martin's Press. ISBN 0-312-05861-6.
