= Trust It =

Studio album by Junior Jack
- Released: 9 February 2004
- Recorded: 2003–2004
- Genre: House; deep house
- Label: PIAS; Noise Traxx; Nettwerk America
- Producer: Junior Jack

Singles from Trust It
- 1. "Thrill Me" Released: 2002; 2. "E Samba" Released: 2003; 3. "Da Hype (feat. Robert Smith)" Released: 2003; 4. "Stupidisco" Released: 14 June 2004

Professional ratings
Review scores
Source	Rating
Allmusic	3.5/5 stars

Trust It is the fifth studio album by the Italian house music producer Vito Lucente under the stage name Junior Jack, released on 9 February 2004 by PIAS Recordings, Noise Traxx and Nettwerk America. It is his first album to use the Junior Jack name.

== Track listing ==
All tracks are written by Vito Lucente, except where noted.

No.	Title	Writer(s)	Length
1.	"Intro"		1:01
2.	"Trust It"	Lucente, Okundji	6:00
3.	"Da Hype"	Lucente, Orlando	6:50
4.	"Stupidisco"	Lucente, Innis, Lorber	5:07
5.	"F*** the System" ((interlude))		0:21
6.	"The Roots"	Byrd	4:25
7.	"Alone"	Mosley, Douglass, Major	5:24
8.	"Hola"		4:12
9.	"E Samba"	Lucente, DeCastro, Velho	6:36
10.	"Luv 2 U"	McDaniels	6:21
11.	"Thrill Me" (with Erick Morillo and Terra Deva)	Lucente, Andre	5:54
12.	"Depression"		5:18
13.	"Do It"		3:49
14.	"Must Be the Darkness"	Lucente, Masumbuko	5:46
15.	"Da Hype" (featuring Robert Smith)	Lucente, Orlando, Smith	5:42

- The CD version of the album features a hidden track. The track can be heard by playing the beginning of track one and then using the rewind/search button to go back 1:52.

== Samples ==
"Stupidisco", contains a sample in the 1985 song by the Pointer Sisters, "Dare Me".

"Luv 2 U", contains a chorus sample in the 1974 song cover by Roberta Flack, "Feel Like Makin' Love". The original version of "Feel Like Makin' Love" is written by Eugene McDaniels.

"Da Hype", contains a sample in the 1982 song by Bobby Orlando, "I'm So Hot for You".

"E-Samba" contains a sample in a 1967 song by Jadir DeCastro, "Negra Sin Sandalia" (Negra Sem Sandalia).

"The Roots" contains a sample from a 1975 song by Donald Byrd, "Change" (Makes You Want to Hustle).

"Alone" contains a sample in the 1999 song by Ginuwine, "Same Ol' G"

"It Must Be Darkness" contains a sample from a 1981 song by Blue Feather, "It's Love".

== Charts ==
Chart (2004)	Peak position
Belgian Albums (Ultratop Flanders)	32
Belgian Albums (Ultratop Wallonia)	57
French Albums (SNEP)	123
