= Coming Up for Air (Davy Knowles and Back Door Slam album) =

Studio album by Davy Knowles and Back Door Slam
- Released: May 19, 2009
- Genre: Blues rock
- Length: 49:04
- Label: Blix Street Records
- Producers: Peter Frampton, Bob Clearmountain

Coming Up for Air is a 2009 album by Davy Knowles. It is the follow-up to Back Door Slam's debut album, Roll Away. The effort was co-produced by Peter Frampton and Bob Clearmountain. Davy Knowles plays electric and acoustic guitars and mandolin, sings lead, and contributes backing vocals. The studio band are Kevin McCormick on bass, Mauricio Fritz Lewak on drums (both from Jackson Browne's band), Benmont Tench on keyboards and Peter Frampton on guitar, bass and backing vocals. Frampton also co-wrote two songs on the album with Knowles.

The distinctive turtle artwork was designed by Manx graphic artist Kit Nelson. Back cover photograph by Todd Bradley, 13 O'Clock Photography.

== Track listing ==
No.	Title	Length
1.	"Coming Up for Air"	4:38
2.	"Riverbed"	3:38
3.	"Mistakes"	4:15
4.	"Hear Me Lord"	6:03
5.	"Amber's Song"	3:12
6.	"Tear Down the Walls"	5:01
7.	"You Can't Take This Back"	4:52
8.	"Country Girl"	4:28
9.	"Keep On Searching"	5:06
10.	"Saving Myself"	3:11
11.	"Taste of Danger"	4:40
Total length:		49:04
