= At Night (song) =

2002 single by Shakedown

Single by Shakedown
- Released: 29 April 2002
- Length: 3:10
- Label: Defected
- Songwriters: Stéphane Mandrax; Terra Deva
- Producers: Seb K; Stéphane Mandrax

Shakedown singles chronology
"At Night" (2002)	"Drowsy with Hope" (2003)

Music video
- "At Night" on YouTube

"At Night" is a song by Swiss house music project Shakedown, featuring vocals from American singer Terra Deva. Released on 29 April 2002, it reached number six on the UK Singles Chart and number one on the UK Dance Chart in May 2002. The song was a minor hit throughout the rest of Europe especially Greece, where it reached number five.

== Music video ==
The music video features an escaped convict going into the woods and encountering a vampire family.

== Track listings ==
European CD single

1. "At Night" (original edit) – 3:10
2. "At Night" (Kid Crème Funksta mix) – 8:04

UK CD and cassette single

1. "At Night" (original edit) – 3:10
2. "At Night" (Mousse T.'s Feel Much Better edit) – 4:45
3. "At Night" (Kid Crème club mix) – 5:00
4. "At Night" (Afterlife remix) – 5:45

UK 12-inch single

A1. "At Night" (original mix) – 6:40
AA1. "At Night" (Mousse T.'s Feel Much Better mix) – 6:05
AA2. "At Night" (Kid Crème club mix) – 6:33

Australian CD single

1. "At Night" (original edit) – 3:10
2. "At Night" (Mousse T.'s Feel Much Better mix) – 7:25
3. "At Night" (Kid Crème Funksta mix) – 8:04
4. "At Night" (Alan Braxe remix) – 6:30

Digital EP

1. "At Night" (club mix) – 6:44
2. "At Night" (Kid Crème Remix) – 8:05
3. "At Night" (Mousse T.'s Feel Much Better mix) – 7:24
4. "At Night" (Alan Braxe remix) – 6:30
5. "At Night" (a cappella) – 0:53

== Charts ==
=== Weekly charts ===
Chart (2001–2002)	Peak position
Australia (ARIA)	79
Australian Club Chart (ARIA)	1
Australian Dance (ARIA)	14
Belgium (Ultratip Bubbling Under Flanders)	12
Belgium (Ultratip Bubbling Under Wallonia)	10
Belgium Dance (Ultratop Flanders)	5
Europe (Eurochart Hot 100)	33
France (SNEP)	94
Germany (GfK)	79
Greece (IFPI)	5
Netherlands (Single Top 100)	98
Scotland Singles (Official Charts)	15
Switzerland (Schweizer Hitparade)	37
UK Singles (Official Charts)	6
UK Dance (Official Charts)	1
UK Indie (Official Charts)	33

=== Year-end charts ===
Chart (2002)	Position
Australian Club Chart (ARIA)	6
UK Singles (OCC)	148

== Certifications ==
Region	Certification	Certified units/sales
United Kingdom (BPI)	Platinum	600,000^{‡}
^{‡} Sales+streaming figures based on certification alone.

== Release history ==
Region	Date	Format(s)	Label(s)	Ref.
United Kingdom	29 April 2002	12-inch vinyl; CD; cassette	Defected	
Australia	17 June 2002	CD	Sony Music Australia	
