= Roll Away (album) =

Studio album by Back Door Slam
- Released: 18 June 2007 (Isle of Man); 1 July 2007 (United States)
- Recorded: N/A
- Genre: Blues rock
- Length: 48:35
- Label: Blix Street (US)
- Producer: Dave Armstrong

Back Door Slam chronology
| Roll Away (2007) | Back Door Slam – EP (2008) |

Professional ratings
Review scores
| Source | Rating |
|---|---|
| Allmusic | 4/5 stars |

Roll Away is the debut album by the Manx blues rock power trio Back Door Slam. It was recorded with the classic lineup of Davey Knowles on guitar, Adam Jones on bass and Ross Doyle on drums and released on 18 June 2007 in the Isle of Man, 1 July in the United States and 25 September 2007 in the United Kingdom, under Blix Street Records. The album incorporates predominantly blues rock, with hints of Celtic music, folk rock and country rock (in "Too Good For Me", "Too Late", "Stay", "Roll Away").

== Track listing ==
All songs written by Davy Knowles and arranged by Back Door Slam except where noted.

1. "Come Home" (arr. w/ Dan Clarke) – 4:18
2. "Heavy on My Mind" – 5:19
3. "Outside Woman Blues" (Blind Joe Reynolds) – 3:27
4. "Gotta Leave" – 5:49
5. "Stay" – 5:36
6. "Too Late" – 2:57
7. "Takes a Real Man" – 4:41
8. "It’ll All Come Around" – 3:56
9. "Too Good For Me" – 4:51
10. "Roll Away" – 3:34
11. "Real Man" (bonus track) – 4:07
