= Back Door Slam – EP =

EP by Back Door Slam
- Released: 2008
- Genre: Blues rock
- Length: 21:00

Back Door Slam chronology
Roll Away (2007)	Back Door Slam – EP (2008)	Back Door Slam: Live From Bonnaroo (2009)

Back Door Slam – EP is an iTunes-exclusive EP by blues-rock power trio Back Door Slam. The EP consists of four tracks, all of which are covers. The last track, "Red House", is a live version.

== Track listing ==
1. "Back Door Slam" (Hayes, Hayes) – 3:51
2. "Riding With the King" (Hiatt) – 4:20
3. "Been Down So Long" (Morrison, Krieger, Manzarek, and Densmore) – 2:45
4. "Red House" (Hendrix) – 10:07

== Personnel ==
- Davy Knowles – guitar, vocals
- Adam Jones – bass
- Ross Doyle – drums
