= Get Down Saturday Night =

- European 7" single cover

Single by Oliver Cheatham

from the album Saturday Night
- Released: 1983
- Genre: Disco; funk; R&B; soul
- Length: 7:32 (12" version); 6:26 (album version); 3:58 (7" version)
- Label: MCA (U.S.); Ariola (Germany)
- Songwriters: Oliver Cheatham, Kevin McCord
- Producers: Al Hudson, Dave Roberson, Kevin McCord (as A.D.K.)

Oliver Cheatham singles chronology
"Everybody Wants to Be the Boss" (1982)	"Get Down Saturday Night" (1983)	"Bless the Ladies" (1983)

"Get Down Saturday Night" is a song by American singer Oliver Cheatham, released in 1983 as the first single from his second album Saturday Night. That spring, the song reached number 37 on the US R&B chart, as well as reaching number 38 on the UK Singles Chart. Considered a disco classic, it was revived in the 21st century through remixes, most notably "Make Luv" by Italian DJ Room 5 (2003) and through use in popular culture.

== Critical reception and legacy ==
The song has consistently received positive reviews. Upon its release, The Washington Informer called it a "TGIF anthem", with its chief virtues being Cheatham's voice and its beat — "not too fast, not too slow, just right for eight minutes on the dance floor." James Hamilton of Record Mirror called it a "superb quietly stated jauntily tripping 116½bpm chunky finger snappin’ killer of a cut." Retrospectively, Music Week called it a "blinky-blonky delight" and a "storming feelgood tune," while Billboard′s Michael Paoletta described it as "dancefloor anthem." Mark Olsen of the Los Angeles Times called it a "swirling, silky" piece of R&B.

The Guardian's Dorian Lynskey wrote that it "has a far more alluring New York swagger" than "Make Luv." Tom Bromley noted that while it was a minor hit in 1983, following the success of "Make Luv" it was retroactively talked up as a "lost disco classic." Others have also dubbed it a classic.

== Remixes and samples ==
A remix by Grove feat. Juan Wells was released on Indochina Records in 1995. The song had previously gained underground popularity as a bootleg titled "Make Love And Listen To The Music" by Barrio De Bargo.

French house producer DJ Kom sampled it in his 1997 single "Git Down Saturday," which was used as part of Daft Punk's 1997 Essential Mix on BBC Radio 1.

The song was remixed as "Make Luv" by Italian DJ Room 5 (Junior Jack) in 2003, which reached No. 1 in the UK chart. In 2004 it was remixed by British DJ Michael Gray titled "The Weekend", reaching No. 7 in 2004.

== Use in popular culture ==
The song has been popularized by uses in popular culture. Most notably, it was featured on the video game Grand Theft Auto: Vice City (2002) and the sci-fi film Ex Machina (2014).

== Track listing ==
=== 1983 releases ===
12" vinyl

- US: MCA / L33-1103

Side one
No.	Title	Length
1.	"Get Down Saturday Night"	7:32

Side two
No.	Title	Length
1.	"Get Down Saturday Night"	7:32

12" vinyl

- UK: MCA / MCAT-828

Side one
No.	Title	Length
1.	"Get Down Saturday Night" (Special extended version)	7:32

Side two
No.	Title	Length
1.	"Something About You"	4:42

=== Other releases ===
- 1988 – "Get Down Saturday Night (You Can Do It)"
- 1989 – "Get Down Saturday Night (Get Down in the 90's)"
- 1998 – "Get Down Saturday Night '98"
- 1999 – "Get Down Saturday Night '99"
- 2002 – "Get Down Samedi Soir" (DJ Abdel feat. Rohff & Oliver Cheatham)
- 2003 – "Get Down Saturday Night (Stand for Love)"
- 2003 – "Get Down Saturday Night (LMC Remix) Rock the Dancefloor 8/Clubland III: The Sound of the Summer/Kiss Hitlist Summer 2003/Clubmix Summer 2003
- 2005 – "Get Down Saturday Night" (Unreleased Promo Mix) (Edit by Thomas Bangalter)
- 2007 – "Get Down Saturday Night" (Special extended version)

== Chart positions ==
=== Weekly charts ===
Chart (1983)	Peak position
U.S. Billboard Hot Black Singles	37
U.S. Top 100 Black Contemporary Singles (Cashbox)	33
UK Singles (OCC)	38
UK Disco & Dance Singles (Music Week)	6
UK Disco Chart (Record Mirror)	7
German singles (1990)	23

=== Year-end charts ===
Chart (1983)	Position
UK Disco Charts (Record Mirror)	36
