= Kid Crème =

Belgian DJ

Kid Crème (born Nicolas Scaravilli, 1974) is a Belgian house music producer and DJ of Italian descent.

== Biography ==
After he was expelled from music college in 1991, he decided to set up his own home studio inspired mainly by the London breakbeat scene.

At 19, he met Francis Shabard (DJ Murvin Jay), who introduced him to House music and together they secured DJ residencies at Club XXX, the first house club night in Brussels at the Theatre of Vaudeville.

Scaravilli spent four years as assistant engineer at Let's Go Studios, where he met his DJ partner and close friend Vito 'Junior Jack' Lucente. In 1994, Scaravilli set up his own label, DTM Recordz, and was offered a recording contract deal by R&S Records.

He was releasing House records through tUK label Drop Dead Discs at the time of the offer. His house remix of "Boom on Drop Dead" caught the attention of Boy George, and remixes for Junior Vasquez and Topazz followed.

PIAS offered Scaravilli a recording contract deal for the label Deluxe Recordings, which he accepted under the moniker Sharpside.

Their second release, "Critical Freaks", gained support with Dave Angel, Claude Young, Pete Tong, Carl Cox and Judge Jules.

With Danny Tenaglia supporting the track "Belgian Resistance", Luke Slater using the track "Telsco Drop" on his album, and Space Cruising getting signed to Dave Angel's label.

In 2001, Scaravilli's first production coined Austin's Groove was signed to Jalapeño Records, who licensed it to Ink in the UK and Subliminal in the US.

Eric Morillo added a Shawnee Taylor vocal on the record. This was the first production he recorded under the name Kid Crème. Two following releases for Distinctive, "Niquid EP" and "Down & Under", were received critically and commercially well received.

Scaravilli, under the Kid Crème moniker, came back with a bootleg of Raw Silk's "Do It To the Music" and renamed it "Hypnotising". The single was released by Positiva and reached number 31 on the UK Singles Chart.

Scaravilli's remix of "At Night", a song by Shakedown, was Seven magazine's 'Single Of The Week'.

When Fatboy Slim played it at the Big Beach Boutique, 250,000 people were in attendance. Upon hearing it whilst visiting her label, Kylie Minogue asked Kid Crème to remix her single "Love at First Sight".

== Discography ==
=== Singles ===
- 2000 "Austin's Groove"
- 2001 "Private Tools"
- 2003 "Down and Under"
- 2003 "Hypnotising"
- 2004 "Everybody"

=== Remixes ===
- 2002 Shakedown - At Night
- 2002 Kylie Minogue - "Love at First Sight"
- 2003 Pique & Nique - "You Will (Miss Me)"
- 2004 Planet Funk - Inside All The People

=== Mix compilations ===
- 2003 Junior Jack & Kid Crème In The House (Defected Records)
