= Parce qu'on est jeunes =

1992 single by Benny B

Single by Benny B feat. DJ Daddy K

from the album Daddy K, Perfect et Moi
- B-side: "Remix"
- Released: January 1992
- Recorded: 1991
- Studio: Private Life Studios
- Genre: Hip hop, Electronic
- Length: 3:22
- Label: Private Life, On the Beach
- Composer(s): Vito Lucente, Richard Quyssens
- Lyricist(s): Amid Gharbaoui

Benny B feat. DJ Daddy K singles chronology
"Dis-moi bébé" (1991)	"Parce qu'on est jeunes" (1992)	"Dix, neuf, huit..." (1992)

"Parce qu'on est jeunes" (lit. "Because We're Young") is a 1991 song recorded by Belgian hip hop act Benny B, with DJ Daddy K also credited on the single's cover. Written by Amid Gharbaoui with a music composed by Vito Lucente and Richard Quyssensand, it was released in January 1992 as the first single from Benny B's second album, Daddy K, Perfect et Moi, and was the band's fourth single overall. As for the previous two singles, it became a hit in France and in Belgium (Wallonia) where it reached the top five.

== Chart performance ==
In France, "Parce qu'on est jeunes" debuted at number 30 on the chart edition of 11 January 1992, reached the top ten two weeks later and peaked at number five for a sole week in its sixth week; it eventually remained for seven weeks in the top ten and 16 weeks in the top 50. It was also number two in Belgium (Wallonia) on 18 January 1992, and stayed in the top ten for three weeks. On the European Hot 100 Singles, "Parce qu'on est jeunes" entered at number 59 on 18 January 1992, reached a peak of number 29 in its seventh week and fell off the chart after 15 weeks of presence.

== Track listings ==
- 7" single
1. "Parce qu'on est jeunes" (radio edit) - 3:22
2. "Parce qu'on est jeunes" (swing beat) - 3:34
- 12" maxi
1. "Parce qu'on est jeunes" (house mix) - 5:28
2. "Parce qu'on est jeunes" (swing beat) - 3:34
3. "Parce qu'on est jeunes" (full length version) - 4:40
4. "Parce qu'on est jeunes" (acapella) - 2:27
- CD maxi
1. "Parce qu'on est jeunes" (radio edit) - 3:22
2. "Parce qu'on est jeunes" (house mix) - 5:28
3. "Parce qu'on est jeunes" (swing beat) - 3:34
4. "Parce qu'on est jeunes" (full length version) - 4:40
5. "Parce qu'on est jeunes" (acapella) - 2:27 (France only)
- Cassette
1. "Parce qu'on est jeunes" (radio edit) - 3:22
2. "Parce qu'on est jeunes" (swing beat) - 3:34

== Personnel ==
- Artwork – dIP Design
- Featuring – DJ Daddy K
- Photography – Stephan Streker

== Charts ==
Chart (1991)	Peak position
Belgium (Ultratop 50 Wallonia)	2
Europe (European Hot 100)	29
France (SNEP)	5

== Release history ==
Country	Date	Format	Label
France	1991	CD maxi	On the Beach
France	1991	7" single	On the Beach
France	1991	12" maxi	On the Beach
France	1991	Cassette	On the Beach
Belgium	1991	CD maxi	Private Life
Belgium	1991	7" single	Private Life
Belgium	1991	12" maxi	Private Life
Canada	1991	CD maxi	Gamma
