= Oliver Cheatham =

American singer (1948–2013)

- Cheatham in 1983

Background information
- Born: February 24, 1948; Detroit, Michigan, U.S.
- Died: November 29, 2013 (aged 65) London, England
- Genres: R&B, soul, funk, boogie
- Occupation: Singer
- Instrument: Vocals
- Years active: 1969–2013
- Labels: MCA, Critique, Warlock, Positiva, Native Soul
- Formerly of: Jocelyn Brown, Room 5

Oliver Cheatham (February 24, 1948 – November 29, 2013) was an American contemporary R&B singer who is best remembered for his 1983 hit "Get Down Saturday Night". The song was sampled by Italian DJ Room 5 on his 2003 single "Make Luv", which reached number one on the UK chart, as well as by British DJ Michael Gray on his 2004 single "The Weekend".

== Biography ==
Cheatham was born in Detroit, Michigan. Encouraged by his mother to sing, over the years he joined several local groups including the Young Sirs, Mad Dog and the Pups and Gaslight before releasing a single, "Hard Times" on the Tier record label. He then joined another group, the Sins of Satan, the group later being renamed as Roundtrip. They finally took Cheatham's first name and recorded two albums as Oliver.

Cheatham then signed for MCA Records as a solo singer. He worked with Al Hudson of the band One Way on his first album, The Boss. His first chart success came in 1983 with "Get Down Saturday Night", co-written by Cheatham and One Way's Kevin McCord, which reached No. 37 on the Billboard R&B chart, and also reached No. 38 on the UK Singles Chart. The album, Saturday Night, produced by Al Perkins, was released the same year. In 1986, he moved to the Critique label, and had further success in the US with the singles "S.O.S." (R&B chart No. 35), and "Celebrate (Our Love)". Other Cheatham singles included "Mama Said", "Put a Little Love in Your Heart", "Things to Make U Happy", and "Wish on a Star". After moving to the New York-based Warlock label, he recorded "Turn Out the Lights" and "Mindbuster" with Jocelyn Brown. He spent much of the 1990s working as a backing singer with artists including Leo Sayer, and released his final album, Stand for Love, in 2002.

He returned to the charts in 2003, when he was featured on Room 5's UK number one single "Make Luv", which sampled "Get Down Saturday Night", though Cheatham re-recorded his vocal parts for later releases. The track was featured on a commercial for Lynx deodorant on British TV. Its success in the UK led Cheatham to relocate to Surrey, England, and he recorded in London for the Native Soul record label.

Elements of "Get Down Saturday Night" were also used in Michael Gray's 2004 hit "The Weekend". It also featured in Grand Theft Auto: Vice City and Ex Machina. The track was also sampled in Lino di Meglio's 2013 song "I Can't Live Without".

Cheatham died on November 29, 2013, at the age of 65, following a heart attack in his sleep.

== Discography ==
=== Albums ===
Year	Album	US R&B
1982	The Boss	—
1983	Saturday Night	52
1987	Go for It	—
1994	Stand for Love	—
1995	So Sensational	—
2002	Stand for Love	—
"—" denotes releases that did not chart.

=== Singles ===
Year	Single	Chart positions		Certifications
Year	Single	US R&B	UK	Certifications
1982	"Make Up Your Mind"	—	—	
1982	"Everybody Wants to Be the Boss"	—	—	
1983	"Get Down Saturday Night"	37	38	
1983	"Bless the Ladies"	—	—	
1983	"Just to Be with You"	—	—	
1986	"S.O.S."	35	—	
1986	"Celebrate (Our Love)"	87	—	
1987	"Be Thankful for What You've Got"	—	—	
1988	"Go for It"	—	—	
1990	"Turn Out the Lights" (feat. Jocelyn Brown)	70	—	
1991	"Put a Little Love in Your Heart"	—	—	
1992	"Things to Make U Happy"	—	—	
2003	"Make Luv" (Room 5 feat. Oliver Cheatham)	—	1	BPI: Platinum
2003	"Music and You" (Room 5 feat. Oliver Cheatham)	—	38	
"—" denotes releases that did not chart.
