= Make Luv =

2003 single by Room 5

Single by Room 5 featuring Oliver Cheatham
- Released: 24 March 2003 (UK)
- Length: 3:32
- Label: Noise Traxx; PIAS; Positiva
- Songwriters: Vito Lucente; Oliver Cheatham; Kevin McCord
- Producer: Junior Jack

Room 5 singles chronology
"Make Luv" (2003)	"Music and You" (2003)

Oliver Cheatham singles chronology
"Things to Make U Happy" (1992)	"Make Luv" (2003)	"Music and You" (2003)

Music video
- "Make Luv" on YouTube

"Make Luv" is a song by Italian music producer Room 5 (also known as Junior Jack), which features the sampled voice of American R&B singer Oliver Cheatham from his 1983 hit "Get Down Saturday Night". Originally released in Belgium and Sweden in 2001, "Make Luv" gained success following its 2003 re-release, reaching No. 1 on the UK Singles Chart, where it remained for four weeks in March and into April of 2003. The song also reached the top 10 in Denmark, Greece, Ireland, Italy, the Netherlands, and Romania.

The song's success was partly due to its use in a popular television advertising campaign for Lynx Pulse deodorant. The duo released another collaboration, "Music and You" in 2003, which reached No. 38 on the UK Singles Chart.

== Track listings ==
Italian CD single

1. "Make Luv" (radio version) – 3:30
2. "Make Luv" (JJ's dub edit) – 6:09
3. "Make Luv" (extended mix) – 5:51
4. "Make Luv" (Axwell dub mix) – 7:22
5. "Make Luv" (Doublefunk remix) – 6:10
6. "Make Luv" (Axwell remix) – 7:22

European CD single

1. "Make Luv" (radio version) – 3:30
2. "Make Luv" (JJ's dub edit) – 6:09

European maxi-CD single

1. "Make Luv" (radio version) – 3:30
2. "Make Luv" (Axwell remix) – 7:22
3. "Make Luv" (JJ's dub edit) – 6:09
4. "Make Luv" (Doublefunk remix) – 5:50

UK and Australasian CD single, UK cassette single

1. "Make Luv" (radio version) – 3:30
2. "Make Luv" (extended mix) – 5:51
3. "Make Luv" (Axwell remix) – 7:22

UK 12-inch single

A1. "Make Luv" (extended mix) – 5:51
A2. "Make Luv" (JJ's dub edit) – 6:18
B1. "Make Luv" (Axwell remix) – 7:22

Canadian CD single

1. "Make Luv" (radio version) – 3:30
2. "Make Luv" (extended mix) – 5:51

== Charts ==
=== Weekly charts ===
Chart (2003)	Peak position
Australia (ARIA)	34
Australian Club Chart (ARIA)	3
Austria (Ö3 Austria Top 40)	55
Belgium (Ultratop 50 Flanders)	29
Belgium (Ultratop 50 Wallonia)	24
Denmark (Tracklisten)	9
Europe (Eurochart Hot 100)	3
France (SNEP)	40
Germany (GfK)	60
Greece (IFPI)	9
Hungary (Dance Top 40)	24
Ireland (IRMA)	5
Ireland Dance (IRMA)	1
Italy (FIMI)	7
Netherlands (Dutch Top 40)	2
Netherlands (Single Top 100)	9
Romania (Romanian Top 100)	8
Scottish Singles Sales (Official Charts)	1
Switzerland (Schweizer Hitparade)	64
UK Singles (Official Charts)	1
UK Dance (Official Charts)	1

=== Year-end charts ===
Chart (2003)	Position
Australian Club Chart (ARIA)	33
Ireland (IRMA)	41
Netherlands (Dutch Top 40)	26
Netherlands (Single Top 100)	71
Romania (Romanian Top 100)	57
UK Singles (OCC)	9

== Certifications ==
Region	Certification	Certified units/sales
New Zealand (RMNZ)	Gold	15,000^{‡}
United Kingdom (BPI)	Platinum	600,000^{‡}
^{‡} Sales+streaming figures based on certification alone.

== Release history ==
Region	Date	Format(s)	Label(s)	Ref.
United Kingdom	24 March 2003	12-inch vinyl; CD; cassette	Positiva	
Australia	5 May 2003	CD	Positiva	
