= Terra Deva =

American singer and actress

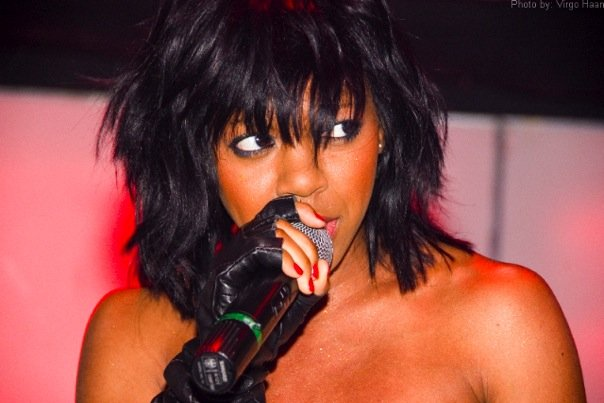
- Derra performing in Estonia in 2011
- Born: Terra McNair Deva; June 22, 1976 (age 49); San Jose, California, U.S.
- Height: 5'5
- Website: terradeva.com

Terra Deva McNair (born June 22, 1976) is an American singer, actress, and dancer, best known for performing on seasons 4 and 5 of Disney Channel's The All New Mickey Mouse Club.

== Biography ==
Deva was born in San Jose, California on June 22, 1976. She lived for several years in New York and London and currently resides in Los Angeles. She has two older sisters named Sheria and Nia.

Deva landed her first job starring in the television show The All New Mickey Mouse Club and was a part of the cast for two seasons. In early 1993, at age 16, she left the show.

She is also known for being the vocalist on the song "At Night" by Swiss music project Shakedown.

== Discography ==
=== Studio albums ===
- Pulled Apart (1998)

=== Singles ===
- Fresh Start (1997)
- Inside (1998)
- NRK ReMasters 003 (2005)
- NRK ReMasters 007 (2005)
- Easy / Sniff (unknown)

=== Guest appearances ===
- Furry Phreaks: Want me (Like Water) (1995), Soothe (1998), and All Over The World (2007)
- Colorful Karma: For the Music (1999)
- Junior Jack: Thrill me / How you Thrill Me (2002)
- AK1200: Fake (2002)
- Pete Moss - After 2 (2002)
- Who Da Funk - Sting Me Red (Clever) (2002)
- Charles Webster - Ready (2002)
- Jimmy Van M & Young American Primitive - Forget Time (2002)
- Morillo - What Do You Want (2004)
- Bang On! Productions - Plush City (unknown)

== Successful singles ==
Terra's most successful singles are:

- "At Night" with Shakedown, which reached number 6 in the United Kingdom and was in the top ten in Europe
- "Sting Me Red (Clever)" with Who Da Funk
- "How You Thrill Me" with Junior Jack and Erick Morillo
- "Less Talk More Action" with Tim Deluxe
