= Dis-moi bébé =

1991 single by Benny B

Single by Benny B feat. DJ Daddy K

from the album L'Album
- B-side: "Remix"
- Released: June 1991
- Recorded: 1990
- Studio: Studio IIC
- Genre: Hip hop, Electronic
- Length: 3:45
- Label: Private Life, On the Beach
- Composer(s): Vito Lucente, Alain Deproost, Richard Quyssens
- Lyricist(s): Amid Gharbaoui

Benny B feat. DJ Daddy K singles chronology
"Qu'est-ce qu'on fait maintenant ?" (1991)	"Dis-moi bébé" (1991)	"Parce qu'on est jeunes" (1992)

"Dis-moi bébé" (lit. "Tell Me Baby") is a 1990 song recorded by Belgian hip hop act Benny B, with DJ Daddy K also credited on the single's cover. Written by Amid Gharbaoui with a music composed by Vito Lucente, Alain Deproost and Richard Quyssensand, "Dis-moi bébé" is a rap-ballad song with a love theme, unlike the previous singles from the album. Released in June 1991, it was the third and last single from Benny B's first album, L'Album. As for the previous two singles, it became a hit in France and in Belgium (Wallonia) where it reached the top five.

== Chart performance ==
In France, "Dis-moi bébé" debuted at number 25 on the chart edition of 6 July 1991, reached the top ten two weeks later and peaked at number four for a sole week in its tenth week; it eventually remained for eight weeks in the top ten and 20 weeks in the top 50, which allowed it to earn a Silver disc awarded by the Syndicat National de l'Édition Phonographique. It was also number four in Belgium (Wallonia) on 9 July 1991, and stayed in the top ten for two weeks. On the European Hot 100 Singles, "Dis-moi bébé" entered at number 80 on 9 July 1990, reached a peak of number 24 in its eleventh week and fell off the chart after 17 weeks of presence.

== Track listings ==
- 7" single
1. "Dis-moi bébé" (original version) - 3:45
2. "Dis-moi bébé" (acoustic version) - 3:41
- 12" maxi
1. "Dis-moi bébé" (original version) - 3:45
2. "Dis-moi bébé" (acoustic version) - 3:41
3. "Dis-moi bébé" (L.A. version by Vito) - 4:32
4. "Dis-moi bébé" (mersey mix by cue) - 7:30
- CD maxi
1. "Dis-moi bébé" (original version) - 3:45
2. "Dis-moi bébé" (acoustic version) - 3:41
3. "Dis-moi bébé" (L.A. version by Vito) - 4:32
4. "Dis-moi bébé" (mersey mix by cue) - 7:30
- Cassette
1. "Dis-moi bébé" (original version) - 3:45
2. "Dis-moi bébé" (acoustic version) - 3:41

== Personnel ==
- Artwork – dIP Design
- Featuring – DJ Daddy K
- Photography – Stephan Streker
- Piano – Eric Imhauser

== Charts and sales ==
=== Weekly charts ===
Chart (1991)	Peak position
Belgium (Ultratop 50 Wallonia)	4
Europe (European Hot 100)	24
France (SNEP)	4

=== Certifications ===
Certifications for "Dis-moi bébé"
Region	Certification	Certified units/sales
France (SNEP)	Silver	125,000^{*}
^{*} Sales figures based on certification alone.

== Release history ==
Country	Date	Format	Label
France	1991	CD maxi	On the Beach
France	1991	7" single	On the Beach
France	1991	12" maxi	On the Beach
France	1991	Cassette	On the Beach
Belgium	1991	CD maxi	Private Life
Belgium	1991	7" single	Private Life
Belgium	1991	12" maxi	Private Life
Belgium	1991	Cassette	Private Life
