= Junior Jack =

Italian house music producer (born 1971)

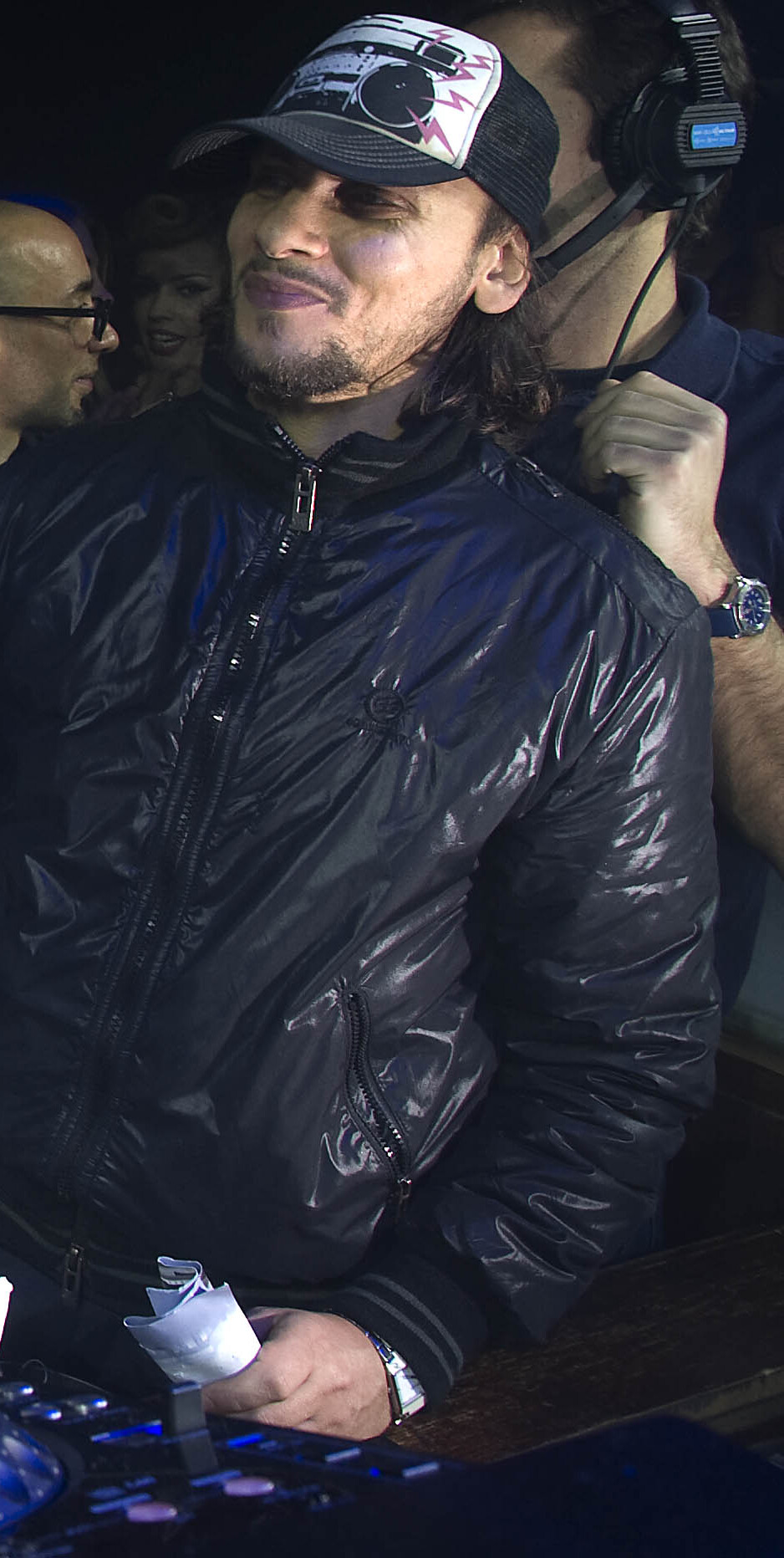
- Junior Jack in 2009

Background information
- Also known as: Room 5, Wamblee, Nu Rican Kidz
- Born: Vito Lucente; 31 August 1971 (age 54); Rutigliano, Apulia, Italy
- Genres: House, French house, nu-disco
- Occupations: DJ, record producer
- Years active: 1990–present
- Website: Facebook

Vito Lucente (Italian pronunciation: [ˈviːto luˈtʃɛnte]; born 31 August 1971), known by his stage name Junior Jack, is an Italian house music producer and DJ based in Belgium.

== Biography ==
In the early years, Vito Lucente produced several acid house and Eurodance projects, mostly in collaboration with Eric Imhauser. However, his more famous project was as producer of the synthpop/rap group Benny B, with vocalist Amid Gharbaoui, DJ Daddy K and dancer Serge "Perfect" Nuet. Lucente left the band after the second album, and he did not produce their last single.

=== Career ===
Vito Lucente resided in Belgium in his teen years. In 1995, he abandoned Eurodance and adopted the name "Mr. Jack" (which would later morph into Junior Jack), dabbling in house music. He entered the UK top 40 with the singles "My Feeling", "Thrill Me (Such a Thrill)", "E Samba", "Dare Me (Stupidisco)" and "Da Hype", the latter featuring vocals by Robert Smith from the Cure and uses samples from "I'm So Hot for You" by Bobby Orlando. His album Trust It was released to critical acclaim. "My Feeling" and "Stupidisco" were built around vocal samples from, respectively, "Saturday Love" by Alexander O'Neal and Cherrelle, and "Dare Me" by the Pointer Sisters. His latest single was a remake of "Dare Me (Stupidisco)", with vocals from Shena, which reached #20 in the UK Singles Chart on 25 February 2007

Lucente has also worked with disco artist Oliver Cheatham under the name Room 5, reaching number-one on the UK Singles Chart with the 2003 single "Make Luv" (which used samples from Cheatham's song "Get Down Saturday Night"). "Make Luv" ended up being certified platinum by BPI in 2022.

As a remixer, he has reworked tracks for artists such as Whitney Houston, Moby, Bob Sinclar and Utada. He has worked extensively in this area with partner Kid Creme.

== Discography ==
=== Albums ===
- 1990 L'Album, as Benny B
- 1992 Perfect, Daddy K Et Moi, as Benny B
- 1992 Walakota, as Wamblee
- 2003 Music & You, as Room 5
- 2004 Trust It, as Junior Jack

=== Singles ===
Junior Jack

Year	Single	Peak chart positions									Album
Year	Single	BEL	AUS	DEN	FIN	FRA	ITA	NED	UK	US Dance	Album
1999	"My Feeling"	40	—	—	—	71	—	—	31	9	Singles only
2000	"U Look Fantastic" (vs. Richard Grey)	—	—	—	—	—	—	—	—	—	Singles only
2002	"Thrill Me" (with Erick Morillo and Terra Deva)	46	78	—	—	—	—	—	29	—	Trust It
2003	"E Samba"	25	—	16	—	—	28	27	34	—	Trust It
2003	"Da Hype" (with Robert Smith)	19	53	17	—	87	18	52	25	1	Trust It
2004	"Stupidisco"	14	46	—	—	—	—	25	26	1	Trust It
2006	"See You Dancin'"	47	—	—	8	—	44	—	—	—	Singles only
2006	"Dare Me (Stupidisco)"	—	—	—	14	—	—	—	20	—	Singles only
2007	"Rocktron / Life"	—	—	—	—	—	—	—	—	—	Singles only
"—" denotes releases that did not chart

Room 5

- 2001 "Make Luv" (with Oliver Cheatham)
- 2003 "Make Luv" (re-release) (with Oliver Cheatham) #1 UK, #34 AUS
- 2003 "Music & You" (with Oliver Cheatham) #38 UK
- 2003 "Think About U"
- 2004 "U Got Me"
- 2005 "Make Luv (The 2005 Mixes)" (with Oliver Cheatham)

Mr Jack

- 1995 "Only House Muzik"
- 1996 "Wiggly World"
- 1997 "The Wiggly World 2 (Jack Is the One)" (with Brenda Edwards)
- 1997 "I Know" (with Olivier Gosseries)
- 1998 "Back from Hawaii EP" (with Olivier Gosseries)
- 1999 "Start!" (with Olivier Gosseries)
- 1999 "Only House Muzik - Remixes '99"
- 1999 "Voodoo Curse" (with Olivier Gosseries)

Benny B

All are collaborations with Amid Gharbaoui, Daddy K and Richard Quyssens

- 1990 "Vous êtes fous !"
- 1990 "Qu'est-ce qu'on fait maintenant ?"
- 1991 "Dis-moi bébé"
- 1991 "Parce qu'on est jeunes"
- 1992 "Dix neuf huit..."
- 1992 "Est-ce que je peux"
- 1993 "Je t'aime à l'infini", with Eric Imhauser, Gregg Wakson, David Linx and François Gery

Latino Brothers productions

All are collaborations with Terry Logist

- 1990 "Move It!", as One Shot
- 1993 "Don't Miss the Party", as One Shot
- 1993 "The Musik", as Latino Brothers
- 1994 "Can You See It", as Kaf'e
- 1994 "I'm in Love", as Fresh Mould
- 1995 "Come with Me", as Latino Brothers
- 1996 "Back in Town EP", as Kaf'e
- 1996 "Fantasy", as Kaf'e
- 1998 "Can You See It '98", as Kaf'e
- 2004 "Carnaval", as Latino Brothers

Hugh K.

All are collaborations with Hugh Kanza and Eric Imhauser

- 1992 "Georgia On My Mind"
- 1993 "Shine On"
- 1994 "One More Time"
- 1995 "Shine On (Unreleased Dubs)"
- 1996 "Higher"

Other aliases

- 1990 "Cocco Di Mamma", as Don Vito
- 1990 "Mais Vous Etes Sottes", as Suzy D (with Richard Quyssens, François Gery and Alain Deproost)
- 1991 "No Name", as F&V (with Frank Sels)
- 1991 "Anitouni", as Wamblee (with Francesco Palmeri)
- 1991 "Wa Na Pi", as Warble (with Francesco Palmeri)
- 1992 "I'm Sorry (Désolé Madame)", as R.I.P. (with Richard Quyssens and Eric Imhauser)
- 1992 "Atomico", as Redline (with Eric Imhauser)
- 1992 "It's Time to Sleep", as Nitrogena (with Eric Imhauser)
- 1993 "Jumping", as Redline (with Eric Imhauser)
- 1993 "Get to You", as Logic Dream (with F. Spindler)
- 1994 "4 U/Just Deep", as Deep Walker
- 1994 "Strange Day", as Marocco
- 1994 "People", as Family Groove
- 1995 "Fuori uno", album released by EMI, as DON VITO, with the single "Grazie a chi".
- 2001 "We Loved", as E-People (with Frank de Gryse and C. Robert Walker)
- 2001 "Tool #1", as Private Tools (with Kid Creme)
- 2002 "Chasing", as Maphia Ltd. (with Kid Creme)
- 2003 "Hidden Sun/Good Times", as Soho
- 2003 "Excuse Me!", as Nu Rican Kidz
- 2003 "Hold Me Up", as Glory (with Frank de Gryse and Jocelyn Brown)
- 2005 "Tool #2", as Private Tools (with Kid Creme)

Production for other artists

- 1993 Bart Herman - "Metropool" (with Eric Imhauser)
- 1994 Bart Herman - "Waterman" (with Eric Imhauser)
- 1994 Daddy K - "Voulez-Vous Coucher Avec Moi?" (with Eric Imhauser)
- 1997 Traisey Elana Williams - "Feel the Fire" (with Frank Degrees)
- 1998 Shelly Dee - "Party"
- 1999 Jerome Prister - "Lovin' Right Now" (with Conga Squad)
- 2001 Dajae - "Everyday of My Life" (with Felix Da Housecat)

== See also ==
- List of number-one dance hits (United States)
- List of artists who reached number one on the US Dance chart
