= Dare Me (song) =

1985 single by the Pointer Sisters

Single by the Pointer Sisters

from the album Contact
- B-side: "I'll Be There"
- Released: June 1985
- Genre: Synthpop; synth-funk
- Length: 3:41
- Label: RCA
- Songwriters: Sam Lorber, Dave Innis
- Producer: Richard Perry

The Pointer Sisters singles chronology
"Baby Come and Get It" (1985)	"Dare Me" (1985)	"Freedom" (1985)

"Dare Me" is a 1985 song originally by American contemporary R&B group the Pointer Sisters, issued by RCA Records.

== The Pointer Sisters version ==
=== Background ===
"Dare Me" was written by Nashville-based songwriters Sam Lorber and Dave Innis in 1984. Innis, who shortly afterwards became a founding member of Restless Heart, was then a staff writer for Warner Bros. music publishing division, and recalls that "Dare Me" was written with the Pointer Sisters in mind, adding: "typically [staff writers] look at who's [recording] now and what kind of material are they looking for, and we would tailor a song for a particular artist and pitch it"..."Sam Lorber and I...did try to put ourselves in the place of what a gal might be thinking...not specifically trying to be a Pointer Sister, but a song written from a female perspective, for sure. There are certain things that are more gender specific and gender appropriate...certain things that a woman can say that a guy's not going to be able to get away with saying."

Featuring a lead vocal by June Pointer, "Dare Me" was issued as the lead single from the Pointer Sisters' platinum-selling album Contact: peaking at number 11 on the Hot 100 in Billboard magazine, "Dare Me" did afford the Pointer Sisters a final Top 10 hit on the magazine's R&B chart, peaking at number 6 and also became the only Pointer Sisters' track to reach number 1 on Billboard's Dance Club chart. "Dare Me" afforded the Pointer Sisters their final Top 40 hit in the British Isles with peaks of number 7 in Ireland and number 17 in the UK; other international chart peaks for "Dare Me" were number 10 in Australia, number 20 in Canada, number 22 in Austria, number 20 in Belgium (the Flemish chart), number 26 in Finland, number 45 in the Netherlands, number 27 in New Zealand, and number 11 in Sweden.

=== Video ===
"Dare Me" was promoted with a music video shot at the Main Street Gym (LA) where scenes for the iconic martial arts film Raging Bull had been filmed: the video introduced the Pointer Sisters in male drag scouting potential boxing talent, then showed the group's members in the boxing ring sparring with Mark Breland. Michael Chapman, the cinematographer for Raging Bull, directed the "Dare Me" video in collaboration with the track's producer Richard Perry. The video features an appearance from Steven Bauer.

=== The Casey Kasem incident ===
In September 1985, while the Pointer Sisters' version was on the Billboard Hot 100 music chart, American Top 40 host Casey Kasem became irritated when the show's producers placed a long distance dedication spot about a listener's dog dying immediately after "Dare Me," which was an uptempo dance song. The song in the dedication was Henry Gross' "Shannon". Kasem expressed his dissatisfaction with a profanity-laced tirade which never made the air, but has become a staple on the Internet. Despite Kasem's rant, the placement of the long distance dedication after "Dare Me" remained unchanged when the show aired for the week ending September 14, 1985.

== Junior Jack version ==
"Stupidisco"

Single by Junior Jack
- Released: June 21, 2004
- Length: 6:40 (album version); 3:40 (radio edit)
- Label: Defected
- Songwriters: Sam Lorber; Dave Innis
- Producer: Vito "Junior Jack" Lucente

Junior Jack singles chronology
"Da Hype" (2003)	"Stupidisco" (2004)	"See You Dancin'" (2006)

"Stupidisco" is a 2004 single by Italian-Belgian house music producer Junior Jack. It topped the Billboard Dance Club Songs chart and peaked at number 25 in the Netherlands, number 26 in the United Kingdom, and number 46 in Australia. In 2006, the song was re-released as "Dare Me (Stupidisco)", featuring vocals from Shena. This version reached number 14 in Finland and number 20 in the United Kingdom. Both versions topped the UK Dance Singles Chart.

=== Music video ===
The official music video was filmed in Brussels, Belgium, in 2004. There is a censored version and an uncensored version. The video itself features two female wrestlers, named "Miss Double D" and "Nasty Nancy". In both versions, towards the end, both women make sexual motions. In the uncensored version, they pull off each other's bikinis while wrestling, then fondle each other and dance naked until the song ends.

The video also features two Pakistani American announcers; one of them is the businessman Mansoor Ijaz. His participation in the video was used to undermine him during the memogate controversy in Pakistan in 2012. When asked why he took part in the video, Ijaz said that he did it as a favour for his wife's friend, whose planned actor for the part did not turn up for filming. Iyaz, who happened to be in Brussels at the time, was the only person with an American accent that the production team could find in time. He also stated that he threatened legal action against the video producer unless Iyaz was cut from the explicit version. "Given my political and public profile in the United States and around the world, it is impossible for me to appear in any part of any video clip with nudity of any type," he told the Associated Press. "I was never present for any part of the video where those naked girls were shown. My wife was present at all times."

=== Charts ===
==== "Stupidisco" ====
Weekly charts

Chart (2004)	Peak position
Australia (ARIA)	46
Australian Club Chart (ARIA)	6
Australian Dance (ARIA)	6
Belgium (Ultratop 50 Flanders)	14
Belgium (Ultratip Bubbling Under Wallonia)	2
Belgium Dance (Ultratop Flanders)	1
Greece (IFPI)	27
Hungary (Dance Top 40)	4
Hungary (Editors' Choice Top 40)	34
Ireland Dance (IRMA)	6
Netherlands (Dutch Top 40)	31
Netherlands (Single Top 100)	25
Romania (Romanian Top 100)	32
Scotland Singles (Official Charts)	26
UK Singles (Official Charts)	26
UK Dance (Official Charts)	1
UK Indie (Official Charts)	2
US Dance Club Play (Billboard)	1

Year-end charts

Chart (2004)	Position
Australian Club Chart (ARIA)	13
Belgium (Ultratop 50 Flanders)	76
US Dance Club Play (Billboard)	33

==== "Dare Me (Stupidisco)" ====
Chart (2007)	Peak position
Finland (Suomen virallinen lista)	14
Hungary (Dance Top 40)	31
Hungary (Single Top 40)	3
Ireland Dance (IRMA)	2
Scotland Singles (Official Charts)	13
UK Singles (Official Charts)	20
UK Dance (Official Charts)	1
UK Indie (Official Charts)	1

== Samples and other covers ==
- Dave Armstrong's song "Make Your Move", samples this track and is similar to Junior Jack's version.
- In 2020, Nervo, Plastik Funk and Tim Morrison released a cover version of "Dare Me".
- In 2022, Belgian producer Maxi Meraki's song "Dare Your Move" samples this track.
- In 2025, Holmes John took his version to Number-one on the ARIA Club Chart.
