= Dave Armstrong (producer) =

Canadian record producer

- Also known as: Groovy And Prime
- Born: David Moseley; 1979 (age 46–47)
- Origin: Vancouver; British Columbia, Canada
- Genres: House music
- Occupations: Record producer DJ
- Years active: 1998–2011
- Labels: In Stereo; Strada Recordings; Eyezcream Recordings; Solmatic Records; Vendetta Records; Boss Recordings; Oxyd Records; Opaque Music; FunkTeck Recordings; Truth Recordings; Art & Craft Recordings; Sugarland Records; Huge Records; Data Records; Hed Kandi; D:vision Records; SPG Music

David Moseley (born 1979), better known as Dave Armstrong, is a Canadian record producer and DJ from Vancouver, British Columbia. He is best known for his tracks "Make Your Move" and "Love Has Gone". Armstrong achieved a number-one single on the UK Dance Singles Chart in January 2008 with "Love Has Gone", a collaboration with Redroche featuring vocals by H-Boogie. The single peaked at number 43 on the UK Singles Chart.

== Career ==
Armstrong began performing in the Vancouver electronic music scene after attending a warehouse party in the late 1990s. In 1998, he met the production duo Redroche, starting a long-term collaboration that led to him signing to their label Eyezcream Recordings in 2002.

Armstrong’s early productions were made using only a computer and headphones, initially using Reason as his digital audio workstation before switching to Ableton Live.

=== Notable tracks ===
==== "Make Your Move" (2003) ====
In early 2003, Armstrong and Redroche produced "Make Your Move", which sampled "Dare Me", a 1985 track by The Pointer Sisters. The track was initially distributed at the Winter Music Conference in Miami, gaining early support from DJs.

The track’s success inspired producer Junior Jack to release a version using the same sample, titled "Stupidisco", which achieved commercial success in 2004. Despite this, Armstrong’s original remained a club favorite and was licensed to Fine Tune Records in 2003, gaining gold record certification in France. It was also licensed to Tommy Boy Silver Label in 2004.

An updated version credited to "Redroche vs. Armstrong" was released in 2011. Swedish producer Avicii later played an unreleased edit of the track in 2012.

==== "Out of Time" (2004) ====
Armstrong produced a cover of Hall & Oates’ "Out of Touch" titled "Out of Time", featuring new vocals by Ingrid Hakanson. While popular in clubs, it was commercially overshadowed by a version by UK act Uniting Nations. Armstrong’s version was later renamed "Out of Touch" for re-releases.

==== "Love Has Gone" (2005–2008) ====
Originally produced in late 2004, "Love Has Gone" was first released as an instrumental in February 2005. Short vocal samples were added later that year.

After an updated instrumental in 2007, a full vocal version featuring H-Boogie was released in 2008 on Data Records. The single reached number one on the UK Dance Singles Chart and number 43 on the UK Singles Chart.

== Discography ==
=== Groovy And Prime ===
==== 2000 ====
- "Listen Here EP" – Busy Beat Records
- "Listen Carefully" – Dirty House Grooves
- "Out There" – Tinrib Recordings

=== Dave Armstrong ===
==== 2002 ====
- "Prime Kutz EP" – In Stereo
- "Slam Jam EP" – Strada Recordings

==== 2003 ====
- "Release the Tension" (featuring MC Flipside) – Eyezcream Recordings
- "Make Your Move" – Eyezcream Recordings
- "Yours Is Yours" (with Christian Alvarez as A&A) – Solmatic Records

==== 2004 ====
- "The Right Groove" / "Can't Fight" – Thump Records
- "Groove in You" (with Steve Angello) – Truth Recordings
- "Out of Time" / "Out of Touch" (featuring Ingrid Hakanson) – Eyezcream Recordings
- "Uniqua" (with Christian Alvarez) – FunkTeck

==== 2005 ====
- "Makin' Me Hot EP" – Sugarland Records
- "Come Back" (with Ben Delay) – Sugarland Records
- "Love Has Gone" (with Redroche) – Eyezcream Recordings

==== 2006 ====
- "Bella" / "Just Do It" (with DJ DLG) – Huge Records

==== 2007 ====
- "Love Has Gone" (instrumental update) – Eyezcream Recordings

==== 2008 ====
- "Love Has Gone" (with Redroche featuring H-Boogie) – Data Records

==== 2011 ====
- "Make Your Move" (Redroche vs. Armstrong) – Eyezcream Recordings
