= Vous êtes fous! =

1990 single by Benny B

Single by Benny B feat. DJ Daddy K

from the album L'Album
- B-side: "Remix"
- Released: May 1990
- Recorded: Belgium
- Genre: Hip hop, hip house
- Length: 3:12
- Label: Vie Privée, On the Beach
- Songwriters: Vito Lucente, Alain Deproost, Abdel Hamid Gharbaoui, R. Quyssens

Benny B singles chronology
"Vous êtes fous!" (1990)	"Qu'est-ce qu'on fait maintenant ?" (1991)

"Vous êtes fous!" (lit. "You're Crazy!") is the debut single by Belgian hip-hop act Benny B, with DJ Daddy K also credited on the single's cover. Released in May 1990, the song is from Benny B's first album, L'Album. It became a summer hit in France and Belgium (Wallonia), where it was a top three hit.

== Background and writing ==
No producer thought that Benny B could release a hit, except Olivier Verhaeghe, the director of the studio Vie Privée, which had "the audacity to believe in Benny B...". He convinced them to change their "too aggressive rhythm, "hip hop" as we call in the United States" for a techno sound easier to be aired on radio and in discothèques. At the time, they believed that they would not be able to sell more than 5,000 or 6,000 discs.

The song was written and the music composed by Vito Lucente, Alain Deproost, Amid Gharbaoui and R. Quyssens.

Several words ("Et qui l'accompagne ?", "Mais vous êtes fous !", "Oh oui !") are sampled from an episode of Captain Future, "The Adventures of Captain Future", released as a single in 1981. The introduction uses a guitar riff from the 1972 song, "Son of Shaft", recorded by The Bar-Kays.

"Vous êtes fous!" was the first hip-hop hit in France, succeeded by the following singles of Benny B and those of MC Solaar, particularly "Bouge de là", from 1991. It was also recorded in Spanish-language, under the title "Estáis locos!". This version features as tenth track on L'Album. Several remixes, produced by R. Cue, Vito Lucente and DJ Daddy K, were available on the various formats.

There were also a cover version by Suzy D (Suzy Naguy), a female alter ego of Benny B. This version was released under the title "Mais vous êtes sottes! (zot)" with New Belgian Sound label and has different lyrics; however, it remains much more confidential than Benny B's version.

== Chart performance ==
In France, "Vous êtes fous !" debuted at number 42 on the chart edition of 26 May 1990, gained a few positions every week and reached the top ten in the sixth week, and peaked at number three in its 20th week. It remained for 18 consecutive weeks in the top ten, then dropped slowly, and totalled 29 weeks in top 50. The same year, the single was certified Gold disc by the Syndicat National de l'Édition Phonographique for 500,000 units. Similarly, in Belgium, the group received a gold disc, on 22 September 1990, in the basement of the Galeries Louise for having sold more than 50,000 discs. On the European Hot 100 Singles, it entered the chart at number 95 on 23 June 1990, reached a peak of number 17 in its 18th week and dropped off the chart after 24 weeks of presence.

== Track listings ==
- 7" single
1. "Vous êtes fous !" (techno version) - 3:12
2. "Vous êtes fous !" (hip hop mix) - 3:08
- 12" maxi
1. "Vous êtes fous !" (techno version) - 4:48
2. "Vous êtes fous !" (hip hop mix) - 3:08
3. "Vous êtes fous !" (radio edit) - 3:00
4. "Vous êtes fous !" (a cappella) - 1:24
5. "Vous êtes fous !" (wild mix) - 4:48
- CD maxi
1. "Vous êtes fous !" (techno version) - 4:48
2. "Vous êtes fous !" (hip hop mix) - 3:08
3. "Vous êtes fous !" (radio edit) - 3:00
4. "Vous êtes fous !" (a cappella) - 1:24
5. "Vous êtes fous !" (wild mix) - 4:48
- 12" maxi - Remixes
1. "Vous êtes fous !" (dance remix) - 5:03
2. "Vous êtes fous !" (a cappella) - 1:24
3. "Vous êtes fous !" (Vito mix) - 4:41
4. "Vous êtes fous !" (Daddy K hip hop remix) - 3:59
- CD maxi - Remixes
1. "Vous êtes fous !" (Vito mix) - 4:41
2. "Vous êtes fous !" (Daddy K hip hop remix) - 3:59
3. "Vous êtes fous !" (dance remix) - 5:03
4. "Vous êtes fous !" (a cappella) - 1:24
- Promo 12" maxi - Spain
1. "Vous êtes fous !" (Vito mix) - 4:45
2. "Vous êtes fous !" (techno version) - 4:48
3. "Vous êtes fous !" (R. Cue mix) - 5:03
4. "Vous êtes fous !" (a cappella) - 1:22
5. "Vous êtes fous !" (Daddy K mix) - 4:01
6. "Vous êtes fous !" (a cappella) - 1:24

== Charts ==
=== Weekly charts ===
Chart (1990)	Peak position
Belgium (Ultratop 50 Flanders)	50
Belgium (Ultratop 50 Wallonia)	2
Europe (European Hot 100)	17
France (SNEP)	3

=== Year-end charts ===
Chart (1990)	Position
Europe (Eurochart Hot 100)	41

== Certifications ==
Certifications for "Vous êtes fous !"
Region	Certification	Certified units/sales
Belgium (BRMA)	Gold	25,000^{*}
France (SNEP)	Gold	400,000^{*}
^{*} Sales figures based on certification alone.

== Release history ==
Country	Date	Format	Label
France	1990	CD maxi	On the Beach
France	1990	7" single	On the Beach
France	1990	12" maxi	On the Beach
France	1990	CD maxi - remixes	On the Beach
France	1990	12" maxi - remixes	On the Beach
Belgium	1990	CD maxi	Vie privée
Belgium	1990	7" single	Vie privée
Belgium	1990	12" maxi	Vie privée
Belgium	1990	12" maxi - remixes	Vie privée
Spain	1990	Promotional 12" maxi	CBS
