= Benny B =

Belgian artist

Abdel Hamid Gharbaoui (born 11 December, 1968, in Brussels), better known by his stage name Benny B, is a Belgian-Moroccan rapper and b-boy. He was the leader of a Belgian hip-hop group of the same name. Their singles "Vous êtes fous!" and "Qu'est-ce qu'on fait maintenant ?" peaked respectively at #3 and #2 in France in 1990. The group enjoyed a rapid success, followed by an equally quick loss of public interest. They disbanded after their second album.

== Discography ==
- L'Album Featuring Daddy K (1990)
  - 1. "Vous êtes fous!"
  - 2. "D.J. D'enfer"
  - 3. "Dis-moi bébé"
  - 4. "Do You Speak Martien ?"
  - 5. "Colère"
  - 6. "Qu'est-ce qu'on fait maintenant ?"
  - 7. "Écoute ! C'est du rap français"
  - 8. "Elle"
  - 9. "Yo ! Home Boys"
  - 10. "Vous êtes fous !" (Spanish)
- Daddy K, Perfect et Moi (1991)
  - 1. "Parce qu'on est jeunes"
  - 2. "Fille facile"
  - 3. "Je t'aime à l'infini"
  - 4. "Respect"
  - 5. "Oui, c'est du rap français"
  - 6. "10.9.8.7..."
  - 7. "Est-ce que vous êtes là ?"
  - 8. "Frère"
  - 9. "Daddy's Dance"
  - 10. "Est-ce que je peux ?"
  - 11. "10.9.8.7..." (mix)
