= Shakedown (band) =

Swiss musical duo

Shakedown is a Swiss musical project, known internationally for its 2002 hit single, "At Night". By the time they started the group in 1999, Stephan Mandrax and Sebastien Kohler were two brothers who blended their knowledge to form their genre, a modified disco infused house crossed with electro.

== History ==
=== The 1980s ===
Stephan 'Mandrax' Kohler, a fan of new wave and punk, made his 1984 DJ debut in a notorious music club called Dolce Vita in Lausanne. While in England he discovered house music, and two years later started to promote illegal parties on his return to Switzerland in order to DJ and play for large crowds, thus pioneering this new sound nationally by playing all over the country and around Europe, especially Paris.

=== Early 1990s ===
Stephan moved to New York City in 1992, starting the labels, Liquid Groove and Boombastic and with the American DJ, Mike Delgado. The label Liquid Groove garnered its first success with the H_{2}O project: H_{2}O featuring Billie "Satisfied", H_{2}O "Living for the Future" and H_{2}O featuring Billie "Nobody's Business" which went to enter the UK top 20 chart.

=== Late 1990s ===
In late 1999, Stephan returned to Switzerland to set up a new home and recording studio. After a stint studying and working as a sound engineer in London, from 1993 to 1996, Sebastien also returned to Switzerland and started the Bel-Air Project and the label Cornflex, which lasted from 1997 to 2000. In 1998, he released a series of CDs including the single "Dark Jazzor", one of the earliest recorded songs to include a crossover of drum and bass incorporated with house.

Recognising they had developed a complementary set of skills, the two brothers created their musical project, Shakedown. They started working together by producing tracks for other artists, before beginning to record a few demo songs with artists such as Pookie and the vocalist Terra Deva.

=== Early 2000s ===
After a year of recording sessions in New York City and Lausanne, their album, You Think You Know was released at the end of 2001 on Sony BMG. It included the track "At Night".

== "At Night" ==
"At Night" became a 2002 dance anthem, crossing over to national charts and peaking in the UK Singles Chart at No. 6. They made an appearance on the BBC Television programme Top of the Pops. In June 2003, a follow-up track, "Drowsy with Hope", peaked at No. 46 in the UK chart.

== Discography ==
=== Charted singles ===
List of singles, with selected chart positions
Title	Year	Peak chart positions						Certification
Title	Year	SWI	AUS	FRA	GER	NLD	UK	Certification
"At Night"	2002	37	79	94	79	98	6	BPI: Platinum
"Drowsy with Hope"	2003	—	—	—	—	—	46	
"Love Game"	2004	55	—	—	—	—	98	
"—" denotes a recording that did not chart or was not released in that territory.

=== Remixes ===
The brothers also produced remixes for the following acts:

- Sly & Robbie "Superthruster" (Palm Pictures)
- Röyksopp "Eple"(Shakedown Remix) (Wall of Sound)
- Mirwais "I Can't Wait" (Shakedown Remix) (Naïve)
- Mousse T "Fire" (Shakedown's Firehorse Mix) (Serious Records)
- Eric Polaire "Polar Bear" (Shakedown Dub) (Panorama)
- Mousse T "Is It Cos I'm Cool?" (Shakedown Tangerine Mix) (Independence /Universal)
- Les Rythmes Digitales "Jacques Your Body" (Shakedown Remix) (PIAS)
- D. Ramirez "La Discotek" (Shakedown Remix) (Underwater Records)
- Virtualmismo "Mismoplastico" (Shakedown Remix) DFC
- Sharam Jey Ft. Princess Superstar "Monday Morning" (Shakedown Remix) (King Kong)
- Haji & Emanuel "The Pressure" (Big Love)

They also garnered success by producing and co-writing for:

- Bootsy Collins: "Funky & You Know It" (Play With Bootsy LP) (Warner)
- Rinôçérôse: "Friction Dancer" / "Get Ready Now" (Schizophonia LP / V2
- Rinôçérôse: "Time Machine" / "Mind City" / "Tomorrow" (Futurinô LP /V2)

Shakedown's tracks were used amongst others in the films The Transporter 2 by Louis Leterrier and Les Corps Impatients by Xavier Gianolli.
