= Blind Joe Reynolds =

Background information
- Also known as: Joe Sheppard
- Born: Joe Reynolds; 1900 or 1904
- Died: March 10, 1968
- Genres: blues
- Occupations: guitarist, singer
- Instruments: guitar, vocals
- Years active: 1929–68
- Labels: Paramount Records, Victor Records

"Blind Joe" Reynolds (1900 or 1904 – March 10, 1968) was an American singer-songwriter and blues guitarist.

Reynolds is thought to have been born in Tallulah, Louisiana in 1904, although his death certificate states his birthplace as Arkansas in 1900. He was blinded by a shotgun blast to the face in Louisiana in the mid- to late 1920s, which resulted in the physical loss of his eyes. Despite this handicap, Blind Joe became known for his distinctive bottleneck style as well as his reported accuracy with a pistol, with which it is said he could judge the position of a target by sound alone.

Reynolds is known to have been polyamorous and somewhat misogynistic, as is apparent from a number of his recordings. He was also known to be outspoken and flamboyant, often using his music as a medium to attack society.

== Aliases ==
It is uncertain what name Reynolds was given at birth. Whilst it is widely thought to have been Joe Sheppard, his nephew Henry Millage claimed it was Joe Leonard. Throughout his career, Reynolds travelled the country performing under various aliases as a way of evading the police, as he had served at least two jail sentences in his early life, as well as "escaping [his] enemies".

== Recording career ==
After years of travelling and performing on street corners, Reynolds was discovered in 1929 by musical talent scout H. C. Speir and entered the studio at least twice, recording four songs on each occasion.

In November 1929, Speir took Reynolds to a small studio in Grafton, Wisconsin, where he recorded the songs "Cold Woman Blues", "Nehi Blues", "Ninety Nine Blues" and "Outside Woman Blues". These were recorded under the name Blind Joe Reynolds and released as two 78rpm records by Paramount Records.

In November 1930, Reynolds re-entered the studio, this time in Memphis, Tennessee. There he recorded the songs "Goose Hill Woman Blues", "Married Man Blues", "Short Dress Blues" and "Third Street Woman Blues" under the name Blind Willie Reynolds for Victor Records. However, only two of these songs were released, on a single 78 rpm record. The recordings of "Goose Hill Woman Blues" and "Short Dress Blues" are thought to be lost forever.

The song "Outside Woman Blues" would later find fame when it was recorded by Cream for their 1967 album, Disraeli Gears. The group became aware of the song after guitarist Eric Clapton heard it featured on the compilation album Country Blues Encores (1965, Origin Jazz Library OJL-8). Curiously, on their version, Cream gave the writing credit to "Arthur Reynolds".

Reynolds' "Ninety Nine Blues"/"Cold Woman Blues" 78 rpm recording for Paramount was thought to be lost until 2000 when a copy, which had been purchased in 1976 at a flea market for one dollar, surfaced. It subsequently sold privately for an undisclosed amount. It remains the only known copy in existence.

== Death ==
In March 1968, Reynolds was admitted to a hospital in Monroe, Louisiana following a stroke, where he died on March 10 of pneumonia.

== Bibliography ==
- "Blind Joe Reynolds". Blues Unlimited (146): 16–20. Autumn–Winter 1984.
