= Outside Woman Blues =

Single by Blind Joe Reynolds
- Released: 1929
- Recorded: Grafton, Wisconsin, November 1929
- Genre: Blues
- Length: 2:59
- Label: Paramount
- Songwriter: Blind Joe Reynolds

"Outside Woman Blues" is a blues song originally recorded by Blind Joe Reynolds in 1929. It is one of the few known recordings made by Reynolds, who used "Woman Blues" in several song titles, including "Cold Woman Blues", "Goose Hill Woman Blues", and "Third Street Woman Blues".

In 1967, the song was popularized by the British rock group Cream, who recorded a blues rock adaptation in 1967 for the album Disraeli Gears, with vocals by Eric Clapton. Live recordings appear on BBC Sessions and Royal Albert Hall London May 2-3-5-6, 2005. Their original recording is included on the compilation album Those Were the Days. Cream's versions are usually credited to "Reynolds, arranged by Eric Clapton". Clapton has also performed the song live as a solo artist.

"Outside Woman Blues"
From the 1967 Cream album Disraeli Gears
