= Eric Clapton singles discography =

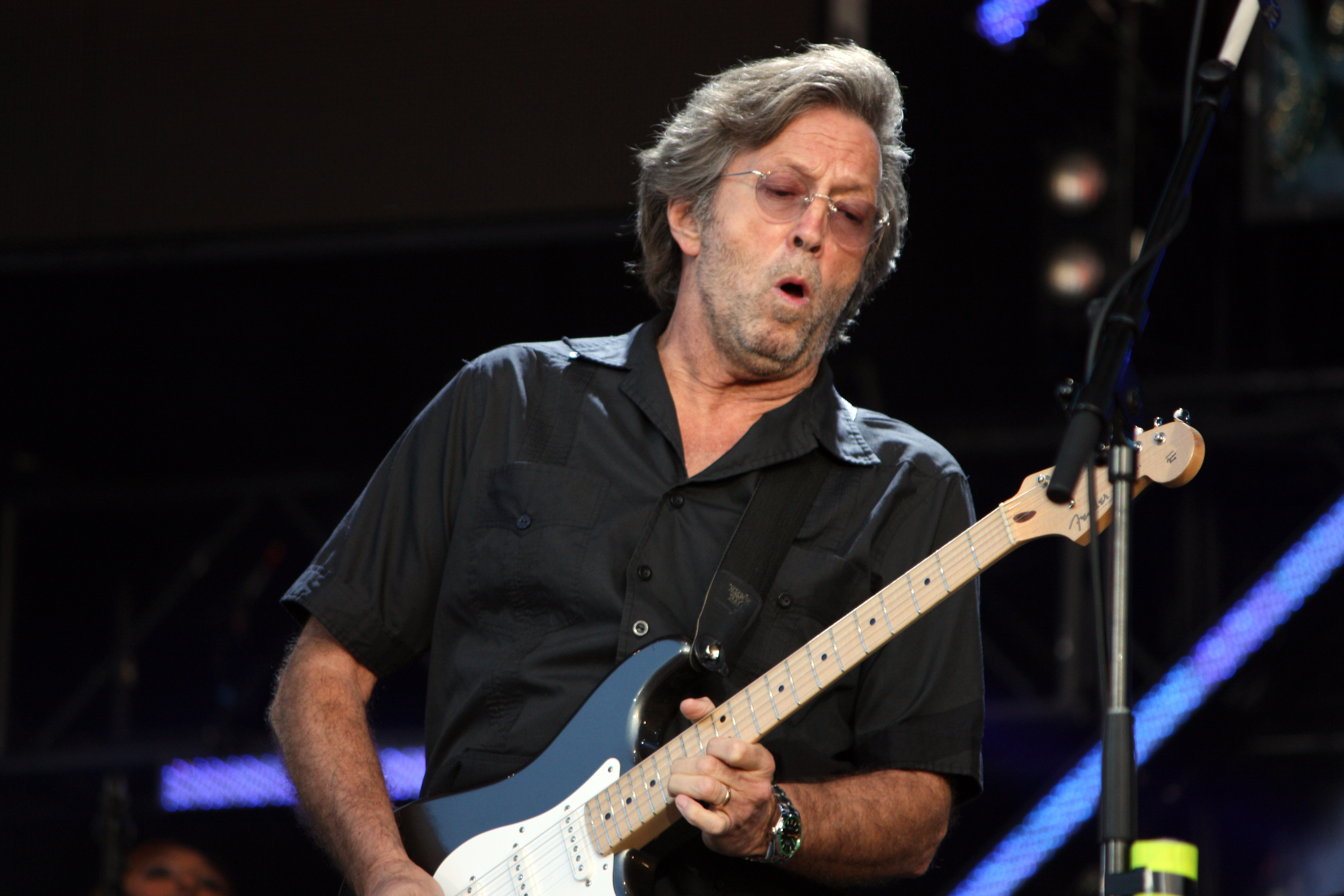
- Clapton performing in Hyde Park, London, June 2008
- 1960s and 1970s singles: 40
- 1980s singles: 16
- 1990s singles: 15
- 2000s and 2010s singles: 10
- Featured singles: 6
- Promotional singles: 30

The singles discography of Eric Clapton consists of 24 early career singles that Clapton recorded with various groups and singers including The Yardbirds, John Mayall & the Blues Breakers, Cream, John Lennon and the Plastic Ono Band as well as Derek and the Dominos. As a solo performer, Clapton released 91 singles and various promotional formats from 1970 to date. His most commercially successful singles are "Lay Down Sally", "Wonderful Tonight", "Change the World", "Tears in Heaven" and Bob Marley's "I Shot the Sheriff", released in 1974, charting substantially better than Marley's own earlier release had, becoming a Billboard Hot 100 number-one hit.

Clapton's best-selling single is "Wonderful Tonight" which has sold more than four million copies worldwide, although he is most known for his rock song "Layla", which was originally released in 1971. Clapton later rerecorded the song acoustically for his 1992 "Unplugged" million-seller, which helped to cement Clapton's reputation as both a guitarist and singer. The British rock musician also collaborated with friends along his extensive solo career. Featured singles with artists like George Harrison, Elton John, Sting, Cher, Chrissie Hynde, Neneh Cherry and Zucchero Fornaciari helped to uplift Clapton's single performances.

== Early career (1960s – early 1970s) singles ==
Year	Title	Peak chart positions							Certifications	Album
Year	Title	UK	US	AUS	AUT	CAN	NLD	NZL	Certifications	Album
with The Yardbirds (1963–1965)
1964	"I Wish You Would" / "A Certain Girl"^{[A]}	—	—	—	—	—	—	—		For Your Love
1964	"Good Morning Little Schoolgirl" / "I Ain't Got You"^{[B]}	44	—	—	—	—	—	—		For Your Love
1965	"For Your Love" / "Got To Hurry"	3	6	22	—	1	—	—		For Your Love
with John Mayall & the Bluesbreakers (1965–1966)
1965	"I'm Your Witchdoctor" / "Telephone Blues"	—	—	—	—	—	—	—		Blues Breakers with Eric Clapton
1966	"Lonely Years" / "Bernard Jenkins"	—	—	—	—	—	—	—		Blues Breakers with Eric Clapton
1966	"Parchman Farm" / "Key to Love"	—	—	—	—	—	—	—		Blues Breakers with Eric Clapton
with Cream (1966–1968)
1966	"Wrapping Paper" / "Cat's Squirrel"	34	—	—	—	—	—	—		Fresh Cream
1966	"I Feel Free" / "N.S.U."	11	116	53	—	—	—	—		Fresh Cream
1967	"Strange Brew" / "Tales of Brave Ulysses"	17	—	23	—	—	—	—		Disraeli Gears
1968	"Sunshine of Your Love" / "SWLABR" (US : Gold)	25	5	18	—	3	—	—	RIAA: Gold	Disraeli Gears
1968	"Spoonful – Part 1" / "Spoonful – Part 2"^{[C]}	—	—	—	—	—	—	—		Wheels of Fire
1968	"Anyone for Tennis (The Savage Seven theme)" / "Pressed Rat and Warthog"	40	64	64	—	37	—	—		Wheels of Fire
1968	"White Room" / "Those Were the Days"	28	6	1	—	2	19	—	BPI: Gold	Wheels of Fire
1969	"Crossroads" (live) / "Passing the Time"^{[D]}	—	28	45	—	13	—	—		Wheels of Fire
1969	"Badge" / "What a Bringdown"	18	60	43	—	49	18		—	Goodbye
1969	"Lawdy Mama" / "Sweet Wine"	—	—	—	—	—	—	—		Goodbye
with John Lennon and the Plastic Ono Band (1969)
1969	"Cold Turkey" / "Don't Worry Kyoko"	14	30	—	—	—	—	—		Shaved Fish
with Delaney & Bonnie & Friends (1969–1970)
1969	"Comin' Home" / "Groupie (Superstar)"	16	84	—	13	—	—	—		On Tour with Eric Clapton
with Vivian Stanshall and the Sean Head Showband (1970)
1970	"Labio-Dental Fricative" / "Paper Round"	—	—	—	—	—	—	—		
with Derek and the Dominos (1970)
1970	"Tell the Truth" / "Roll It Over"	—	—	—	—	—	—	—		Layla and Other Assorted Love Songs
1971	"Bell Bottom Blues" / "Keep on Growing"	—	91	—	—	—	—	—		Layla and Other Assorted Love Songs
1971	"Layla" / "I am Yours"	—	51	—	—	—	—	—	BPI: Platinum	Layla and Other Assorted Love Songs
1972	"Layla" / "Bell Bottom Blues"	7	10	100	—	9	—	—		Layla and Other Assorted Love Songs
1973	"Bell Bottom Blues" / "Little Wing"^{[E]}	—	78	—	—	—	—	—		Layla and Other Assorted Love Songs
1973	"Why Does Love Got to Be So Sad" (live) / "Presence of the Lord" (live)	—	—	—	—	—	—	—		In Concert
1982	"Layla" / "Bell Bottom Blues" (re-issue)	4	—	—	—	—	—	—		
"—" denotes releases that did not chart

== Solo career singles ==
=== 1970s ===
Year	Single	Peak chart positions										Certifications (sales thresholds)	Album
Year	Single	UK	AUS	BEL	CAN	FRA	ITA	JPN	NED	NZL	US	Certifications (sales thresholds)	Album
1970	"After Midnight" b/w "Easy Now"	—	51	—	10	—	—	87	19	17	18		Eric Clapton
1970	"Blues Power" b/w "Bottle of Red Wine"	—											Eric Clapton
1972	"Let It Rain" b/w "Easy Now"	—	99	—	42	—	—	—	—	—	48		Eric Clapton at His Best
1974	"I Shot the Sheriff" b/w "Give Me Strength"	9	11	7	1	28	42	7	5	1	1	MC: 2× Platinum; RIAA: Gold; RIAJ: Gold; RMNZ: Gold	461 Ocean Boulevard
1974	"Willie and the Hand Jive" b/w "Mainline Florida"	55 (Note: Chart position is from the official UK "Breakers List".)	—	—	31	—	—	99	28	—	26		461 Ocean Boulevard
1975	"Swing Low, Sweet Chariot" b/w "Pretty Blue Eyes"	19	—	—	—	—	—	89	26	15	—		There's One in Every Crowd
1975	"Knockin' on Heaven's Door" b/w "Someone Like You"	38	99	—	—	46	—	54	31	—	—		Non-album single
1976	"Hello Old Friend" b/w "All Our Past Times"	—	54	—	37	—	—	87	—	—	24		No Reason to Cry
1977	"Carnival" b/w "Hungry"	—	—	—	—	—	78	99	20	—	—		No Reason to Cry
1977	"Lay Down Sally" b/w "Cocaine"	39	57	—	3	44	83	5	—	16	3	BPI: Silver (for "Cocaine"); MC: Gold; RIAA: Gold; RIAJ: Gold; RMNZ: Platinum	Slowhand
1977	"Wonderful Tonight" b/w "Peaches and Diesel"	81	53	5	15	3	24	1	2	26	16	BPI: Platinum; RIAA: Gold; RIAJ: Million; SNEP: Silver; RMNZ: 3× Platinum	Slowhand
1978	"Promises" b/w "Watch Out for Lucy"	37	26	—	7	71	99	75	40	35	9; 40		Backless
1979	"If I Don't Be There by Morning" b/w "Tulsa Time"	—	—	—	—	—	—	— 98	—	—	—		Backless

=== 1980s ===
Year	Single	Peak chart positions										Certifications (sales thresholds)	Album
Year	Single	UK	AUS	BEL	CAN	FRA	ITA	JPN	NED	US	US Main.	Certifications (sales thresholds)	Album
1980	"Tulsa Time" (live) b/w "Cocaine" (live)	—	—	—	3	58	—	—	14	30	—	MC: Gold; NVPI: Platinum	Just One Night
1980	"Blues Power" (live) b/w "Early in the Morning" (live)	—	—	—	—	—	—	—	—	76	—		Just One Night
1981	"I Can't Stand It" b/w "Black Rose"	—	—	—	15	62	99	84	—	10	1		Another Ticket
1981	"Another Ticket" b/w "Rita Mae"	—	—	—	—	—	—	—	—	78	18		Another Ticket
1983	"I've Got a Rock 'n' Roll Heart" b/w "Man in Love"	83	81	—	17	—	65	99	—	18	24		Money and Cigarettes
1983	"Slow Down Linda" b/w "The Shape You're In"	—	—	—	—	—	—	97	—	—	—		Money and Cigarettes
1983	"The Shape You're In" b/w "Crosscut Saw"	75	—	—	—	—	—	78	—	—	—		Money and Cigarettes
1985	"Forever Man" b/w "Too Bad"	51	92	22	75	—	99	23	15	26	1	RIAJ: Gold	Behind the Sun
1985	"See What Love Can Do" b/w "She's Waiting"	—	—	—	—	—	—	—	—	89	20		Behind the Sun
1985	"She's Waiting" b/w "Jailbait"	—	—	—	—	—	—	—	—	—	11		Behind the Sun
1985	"Edge of Darkness" b/w "Shoot Out"	65	—	—	—	—	—	—	—	—	—		Edge of Darkness OST
1986	"It's in the Way That You Use It" b/w "Grand Illusion"	77	24	—	—	—	99	56	—	—	1		August
1987	"Behind the Mask" b/w "Grand Illusion"	15	—	—	—	—	—	—	—	—	—		August
1987	"Tearing Us Apart" b/w "Hold On"	56	92	34	—	—	89	63	30	—	5		August
1987	"Holy Mother" b/w "Tangled in Love"	95	—	—	—	—	—	—	—	—	—		August
1989	"Pretending" b/w "Before You Accuse Me"	96	85	—	24	—	99	54	29	55	1		Journeyman
1989	"Running on Faith" (radio edit) b/w "Hound Dog"	—	—	—	—	—	—	—	—	—	—		Journeyman

=== 1990s ===
Year	Single	Peak chart positions										Certifications (sales thresholds)	Album
Year	Single	UK	AUS	BEL	CAN	GER	JPN	NED	POL	US	US Main.	Certifications (sales thresholds)	Album
1990	"Bad Love" b/w "Before You Accuse Me"	25	—	—	36	—	10	83	14	88	1	RIAJ: Gold	Journeyman
1990	"No Alibis" b/w "Running on Faith"	53	—	—	—	—	98	—	—	—	4		Journeyman
1990	"Run So Far" b/w "Running on Faith"	—	—	—	—	—	89	—	—	—	40		Journeyman
1991	"Wonderful Tonight" (live) b/w "Edge of Darkness"	30	—	—	—	—	75	—	—	—	—		24 Nights
1992	"Tears in Heaven" b/w "White Room" (live)	5	37	16	1	42	1	13	1	2	9	BPI: Gold; ARIA: Gold; BEA: Gold; MC: 2× Platinum; RIAA: Platinum; RIAJ: 2× Platinum	Rush: Music from the Motion Picture Soundtrack
1992	"Layla" (acoustic) b/w "Tears in Heaven" (acoustic)	45	7	19	1	35	1	8	3	12	9	ARIA: Gold; MC: 2× Platinum; RIAJ: Platinum	Unplugged
1994	"Motherless Child" b/w "Driftin'"	63	—	—	9	—	23	—	37	—	23		From the Cradle
1996	"Change the World" b/w "Danny Boy"	18	8	27	1	30	1	24	17	5	2	ARIA: Gold; RIAA: Gold; RIAJ: Platinum; RMNZ: Platinum	Phenomenon: Music from the Motion Picture
1998	"Born in Time" (album version) b/w "Born in Time" (remix edited version)	—	—	—	—	88	76	—	12	—	—	IFPI ČNS: Silver	Pilgrim
1998	"Circus" (album version) b/w "Wonderful Tonight"	39	—	—	—	—	99	92	33	—	—		Pilgrim
1998	"My Father's Eyes" b/w "Inside of Me" (instrumental remix)	33	77	—	2	57	35	72	3	16	26		Pilgrim
1998	"Pilgrim" (Mick Guzauski remix edit) b/w "Pilgrim" (album version)	—	—	—	—	—	76	—	24	—	—		Pilgrim
1999	"Blue Eyes Blue" (album version) b/w "Blue Eyes Blue" (edited version)	94	—	—	30	84	45	—	28	112	—		Runaway Bride: Music from the Motion Picture
1999	"(I) Get Lost" b/w "Main Title"	—	—	—	—	83	23	—	37	—	—		The Story of Us: Music from the Motion Picture

=== 2000s ===
Year	Single	Peak chart positions				Album
Year	Single	JPN	POL	US Main.	SWI	Album
2000	"Come Rain or Come Shine" b/w "Ten Long Years"	—	—	—	—	Riding with the King
2000	"Marry You" b/w "Three O'Clock Blues"	—	—	—	—	Riding with the King
2000	"Riding with the King" b/w "Key to the Highway"	99	38	26	—	Riding with the King
2000	"Worried Life Blues" b/w "Days of Old"	—	—	—	—	Riding with the King
2000	"When My Heart Beats Like a Hammer" (edited version) b/w "I Wanna Be"	—	—	—	—	Riding with the King
2000	"Help the Poor" b/w "Hold On I'm Coming"	—	—	—	—	Riding with the King
2001	"I Ain't Gonna Stand for It" b/w "Losing Hand"	78	6	—	63	Reptile

=== 2010s ===
Year	Single	Peak chart positions			Album
Year	Single	JPN	POL	US AC	Album
2013	"Every Little Thing" (Steppers mix) b/w "No Sympathy"	99	40	26	Old Sock
2016	"Can't Let You Do It"	—	—	—	I Still Do
2016	"Catch the Blues"	—	—	—	I Still Do

=== 2020s ===
Year	Single	Album
2024	"One Woman"	Meanwhile

== Featured singles ==
Year	Single	Peak chart positions										Certifications (sales thresholds)	Album
Year	Single	UK	AUS	BEL	FRA	GER	ITA	NED	US Main.	SWE	SWI	Certifications (sales thresholds)	Album
1969	"Comin' Home" with Delaney & Bonnie & Friends	—											On Tour with Eric Clapton
1991	"Wonderful World" with Zucchero	—	—	—	—	71	—	12	—	—	—		Zu & Co.
1992	"Runaway Train" with Elton John	31	—	17	15	41	10	28	10	—	15	IFPI NOR: Gold	The One
1992	"It's Probably Me" with Sting	30	23	11	2	22	1	6	20	29	16	ARIA: Gold; FIMI: Gold	Lethal Weapon 3: Music from the Motion Picture
1995	"Love Can Build a Bridge" with Cher · Chrissie Hynde · Neneh Cherry	1	—	—	—	62	—	41	—	—	21	BPI: Silver	Non-album single
2000	"Forever Man (How Many Times?)" with Beatchuggers	26	—	—	—	—	—	—	—	—	—		Nouvelle Discothèque

== Promotional singles ==
Year	Single	Peak chart positions						Album
Year	Single	BEL	CAN	JPN	POL	US AC	US Main.	Album
1981	"Catch Me If You Can"	—	—	—	—	—	23	Another Ticket
1981	"Blow Wind Blow"	—	—	—	—	—	24	Another Ticket
1983	"Ain't Going Down"	—	—	—	—	—	32	Money and Cigarettes
1987	"Run"	—	—	—	—	—	21	August
1987	"Miss You"	—	—	—	—	—	9	August
1988	"After Midnight"	—	—	—	—	—	4	Crossroads
1990	"Watch Yourself" b/w "White Room" (edit)	—	—	—	—	—	21	24 Nights
1992	"Help Me Up"	—	49	—	—	—	6	Rush: Music from the Motion Picture Soundtrack
1993	"Stone Free"	—	43	—	—	—	4	Stone Free
1993	"Old Love" (radio edit) b/w "Old Love" (extended guitar version)	—						Unplugged
1993	"Running On Faith" (acoustic)	—	23	—	—	28	15	Unplugged
1994	"It Hurts Me Too" b/w "Someday After a While"	—						From the Cradle
1994	"Hoochie Coochie Man"	—						From the Cradle
1994	"I'm Tore Down" b/w "County Jail" (live)	—	19	98	37	—	5	From the Cradle
1995	"I'm Tore Down" b/w "Hoochie Coochie Man"	—						From the Cradle
1998	"She's Gone"	—	—	—	—	—	19	Pilgrim
2001	"Superman Inside" (edited version) b/w "Superman Inside" (album version)	—	—	—	—	—	21	Reptile
2001	"Believe in Life" (single edit) b/w "Believe in Life" (album version)	—	—	—	38	11	—	Reptile
2004	"If I Had Possession Over Judgement Day" "Come On in My Kitchen"	—						Me and Mr. Johnson
2005	"Say What You Will"	—	—	—	—	9	—	Back Home
2005	"Revolution" (edited version) "Revolution" (album version)	—						Back Home
2010	"Run Back to Your Side" "Diamonds Made from Rain"	—						Clapton
2010	"Diamonds Made from Rain" "Autumn Leaves"	—						Clapton
2010	"Autumn Leaves"	—	—	61	—	—	—	Clapton
2013	"All of Me"	—						Old Sock
2013	"Gotta Get Over"	21	—	17	25	—	—	Old Sock
2013	"Angel"	—	—	—	27	—	—	Old Sock
2014	"They Call Me the Breeze"	16	—	—	23	—	—	The Breeze
2014	"Don't Wait"	81	—	—	—	—	—	The Breeze
2014	"Songbird"	—						The Breeze

== See also ==
- Eric Clapton videography
