= Complete Clapton =

Greatest hits album by Eric Clapton
- Released: 9 October 2007
- Recorded: 1966–2006
- Genre: Rock · blues · pop
- Length: 154:52
- Label: Reprise · Polydor

Eric Clapton chronology
The Road to Escondido (2006)	Complete Clapton (2007)	Live from Madison Square Garden (2009)

Complete Clapton is a greatest hits collection by British rock musician Eric Clapton, released on 9 October 2007 to accompany Clapton's official autobiography.

== Release ==
The two-disc collection was released on 9 October 2007 to accompany Eric Clapton's official autobiography, Clapton: The Autobiography, released that same year (see also 2007 in music). An exclusive edition sold through Barnes & Noble bookstores in the United States included a bonus compact disc with four additional tracks. As with The Rolling Stones' Forty Licks, each disc has been compiled by different record companies: disc one, virtually identical to The Cream of Clapton by Polydor, and disc two by Warner Bros. Records. Clapton helped to promote the album by being interviewed by Matt Lauer on the Today Show in 2007.

== Critical reception ==
Professional ratings
Review scores
Source	Rating
AllMusic	3.5/5 stars

AllMusic critic Stephen Thomas Erlewine quickly notes that this compilation "doesn't even attempt to cover as much ground as his landmark four-disc 1988 box set Crossroads", but also recalls Complete Clapton "covers the nearly 20 years that have elapsed since the release of Crossroads, a time frame which includes the blockbuster success of his 1992 Unplugged, its all-blues 1994 follow-up From the Cradle, and many soft adult contemporary hits from the late '90s". Erlewine rounds his review up by saying it: "turns Complete Clapton into a portrait of Clapton the classic rocker" and "does hit the obvious highlights well and serves as a good hits package for the casual and curious fan, and in that sense, it works as a good companion piece to Clapton's autobiography".

== Commercial success ==
The compilation debuted at number 14 on the U.S. Billboard 200. It also peaked at number two on the British albums chart, compiled by the Official Charts Company.

== Track listing ==
All songs are by Eric Clapton, except where noted.

Disc 1
No.	Title	Writer(s)	Original album	Length
1.	"I Feel Free" (Cream)	Pete Brown, Jack Bruce	Fresh Cream, 1966	2:52
2.	"Sunshine of Your Love" (Cream)	Brown, Bruce, Eric Clapton	Disraeli Gears, 1967	4:09
3.	"White Room" (Cream)	Brown, Bruce	Wheels of Fire, 1968	4:56
4.	"Crossroads" (Live) (Cream)	Robert Johnson, arr. by Clapton	Wheels of Fire	4:06
5.	"Badge" (Cream)	Clapton, George Harrison	Goodbye, 1969	2:40
6.	"Presence of the Lord" (Blind Faith)	Clapton	Blind Faith, 1969	4:46
7.	"After Midnight"	J. J. Cale	Eric Clapton, 1970	3:06
8.	"Let It Rain"	Bonnie Bramlett, Delaney Bramlett, Clapton	Eric Clapton	5:03
9.	"Bell Bottom Blues" (Derek & the Dominos)	Clapton	Layla and Other Assorted Love Songs, 1970	5:00
10.	"Layla" (Derek & the Dominos)	Clapton, Jim Gordon	Layla and Other Assorted Love Songs	7:07
11.	"Let It Grow"	Clapton	461 Ocean Boulevard, 1974	4:54
12.	"I Shot the Sheriff"	Bob Marley	461 Ocean Boulevard	4:20
13.	"Knockin' on Heaven's Door"	Bob Dylan	Non-album single, 1975	4:22
14.	"Hello Old Friend"	Clapton	No Reason to Cry, 1976	3:32
15.	"Cocaine"	Cale	Slowhand, 1977	3:32
16.	"Lay Down Sally"	Clapton, Marcy Levy, George Terry	Slowhand	3:47
17.	"Wonderful Tonight"	Clapton	Slowhand	3:38
18.	"Promises"	Richard Feldman, Roger Linn	Backless, 1978	2:57
19.	"I Can't Stand It"	Clapton	Another Ticket, 1981	4:07
Total length:				78:54

Disc 2
No.	Title	Writer(s)	Original album	Length
1.	"I've Got a Rock 'n' Roll Heart"	Troy Seals, Eddie Setser, Steve Diamond	Money and Cigarettes, 1983	3:12
2.	"She's Waiting"	Clapton, Peter Robinson	Behind the Sun, 1985	4:54
3.	"Forever Man"	Jerry Lynn Williams	Behind the Sun	3:11
4.	"It's in the Way That You Use It"	Clapton, Robbie Robertson	August, 1986	4:10
5.	"Miss You"	Clapton, Bobby Columby, Greg Phillinganes	August	5:05
6.	"Pretending"	Williams	Journeyman, 1989	4:42
7.	"Bad Love"	Clapton, Mick Jones	Journeyman	5:08
8.	"Tears in Heaven"	Clapton, Will Jennings	Rush: Music from the Motion Picture Soundtrack, 1992	4:31
9.	"Layla" (Acoustic version)	Clapton, Gordon	Unplugged, 1992	4:38
10.	"Running on Faith" (Acoustic version)	Williams	Unplugged	6:10
11.	"Motherless Child"	Robert Hicks	From the Cradle, 1994	2:56
12.	"Change the World"	Tommy Sims, Gordon Kennedy, Wayne Kirkpatrick	Phenomenon: Music from the Motion Picture, 1996	3:54
13.	"My Father's Eyes"	Clapton	Pilgrim, 1998	5:22
14.	"Riding with the King" (B.B. King and Eric Clapton)	John Hiatt	Riding with the King, 2000	4:23
15.	"Sweet Home Chicago"	Johnson	Sessions for Robert J, 2004	5:15
16.	"If I Had Possession Over Judgment Day"	Johnson	Me and Mr. Johnson, 2004	3:26
17.	"Ride the River" (J.J. Cale and Eric Clapton)	Cale	The Road to Escondido, 2006	4:35
Total length:				75:58

Barnes & Noble limited edition
No.	Title	Writer(s)	Original album	Length
1.	"Old Love"	Clapton, Robert Cray	Journeyman	6:21
2.	"Blues Before Sunrise"	Leroy Carr	From the Cradle	2:58
3.	"Milkcow's Calf Blues"	Johnson	Me and Mr. Johnson	3:19
4.	"Ramblin' On My Mind"	Johnson	Sessions for Robert J	2:42
Total length:				15:20

== Chart positions ==
=== Weekly charts ===
Chart (2007–2022)	Peak position
Australian Albums (ARIA)	38
Austrian Albums (Ö3 Austria)	20
Belgian Albums (Ultratop Flanders)	51
Belgian Albums (Ultratop Wallonia)	20
Czech Albums (ČNS IFPI)	41
Danish Albums (Hitlisten)	19
Dutch Albums (Album Top 100)	15
German Albums (Offizielle Top 100)	41
Hungarian Albums (MAHASZ)	25
Irish Albums (IRMA)	15
Italian Albums (FIMI)	33
South Korean International Albums (Circle)	14
New Zealand Albums (RMNZ)	14
Norwegian Albums (VG-lista)	5
Polish Albums (ZPAV)	31
Portuguese Albums (AFP)	14
Scottish Albums (OCC)	2
Spanish Albums (Promusicae)	17
Swedish Albums (Sverigetopplistan)	11
Swiss Albums (Schweizer Hitparade)	32
UK Albums (OCC)	2
UK Digital Albums (OCC)	17
US Billboard 200	14
US Digital Albums (Billboard)	14
US Top Catalog Albums (Billboard)	21
US Top Internet Albums (Billboard)	14
US Top Rock Albums (Billboard)	5

=== Year-end charts ===
Chart (2007)	Position
UK Albums (OCC)	41
Chart (2019)	Position
US Top Rock Albums (Billboard)	67
Chart (2020)	Position
US Top Rock Albums (Billboard)	45
Chart (2021)	Position
US Top Rock Albums (Billboard)	42

== Certifications ==
Region	Certification	Certified units/sales
Ireland (IRMA)	Platinum	15,000^{^}
Japan (RIAJ)	Gold	100,000^{^}
New Zealand (RMNZ)	Platinum	15,000^{‡}
South Korea	—	20,345
United Kingdom (BPI)	2× Platinum	600,000^{‡}
United States (RIAA)	Gold	500,000^{^}
^{^} Shipments figures based on certification alone.^{‡} Sales+streaming figures based on certification alone.
