= Blue Eyes Blue =

Single by Eric Clapton

from the album Clapton Chronicles: The Best of Eric Clapton
- Released: July 20, 1999
- Genre: Acoustic · pop · pop rock
- Length: 4:43
- Label: Reprise
- Songwriter: Diane Warren
- Producer: Rob Cavallo

Eric Clapton singles chronology
"Pilgrim" (1998)	"Blue Eyes Blue" (1999)	"(I) Get Lost" (1999)

Music video
- "Blue Eyes Blue" on YouTube

"Blue Eyes Blue" is a pop song written by American songwriter Diane Warren. The tune was written for the 1999 soundtrack of Runaway Bride. The British rock musician Eric Clapton recorded the song for the soundtrack and released his performance of the song as a single on July 20, 1999, for Reprise Records.

== Background ==
The pop track was written by Diane Warren, especially for the 1999 romantic comedy film Runaway Bride, starring Julia Roberts and Richard Gere. The song was published under Realsongs, a division of American Society of Composers, Authors and Publishers organization.

Clapton recorded the song in Los Angeles, at Ocean Way/Record One Studios in the summer of 1999. The track was recorded at Los Angeles facility's Studio B, featuring an 80-input Solid State Logic SL 9000J console. When it came time for Clapton to record on the Diane Warren song, Allen Sides, owner of Ocean Way Studios worked on the release as the leading recording engineer. The recording was produced by Rob Cavallo. Greg Curtis and Blumpy were in charge of the recording's music programming and Chris Lord-Alge mixed "Blue Eyes Blue". The recording featured Eric Clapton singing and playing the guitar, Greg Curtis on keyboards and background vocals, Tim Pierce and Darryl Crooks on rhythm guitar, Nathan East as the bassist, Steve Ferrone on drums, Jamie Muhoberac on keyboards, Luis Conte and Mike Fasano on the percussion instrument. Orchestral composer David Campbell arranged the strings for the release.

The song was released on July 27, 1999, as part of the Runaway Bride soundtrack on compact disc and music cassette, seven days after the single had been released. On October 12, 1999, the song appeared on the compilation album Clapton Chronicles: The Best of Eric Clapton. On September 11, 2001, "Blue Eyes Blue" was released as part of the double album Unplugged/Clapton Chronicles: The Best of Eric Clapton. On November 25, 2002, the pop title was released on the compilation album Songs of Love, by various artists.

== Composition ==
Billboard magazine's Paul Verna thinks, the track belongs to the genre of pop music. Clapton himself called his take on the song "girls-like" and "soft".

== Personnel ==
- Eric Clapton – lead vocals, acoustic lead guitar
- Tim Pierce – acoustic rhythm guitar
- Darryl Crooks – acoustic rhythm guitar
- Greg Curtis – keyboards, backing vocals
- Jamie Muhoberac – keyboards
- Nathan East – bass guitar
- Steve Ferrone – drums
- Luis Conte – percussion
- Mike Fasano – percussion
- David Campbell – string arrangements

== Music video ==
To help promote both the single and soundtrack's sales figures, Clapton filmed a music video to accompany the single release. In the beginning, the music video shows Clapton, who dressed in a men's wedding outfit, sitting in front of a white church with a Martin Triple-O acoustic guitar, followed by a scene from the movie, in which Julia Roberts is riding a horse. Afterwards, Clapton is shown singing and playing the song inside the church, while several snippets of the horse-scene re-appear.

Several scenes from the movie appear with Clapton being shown in between the movie sequences. Two minutes and twenty seconds into the music video, Clapton is shown, not wearing his entire suit anymore, playing and singing the song outside the church in a garden, where the wedding ceremony of Runaway Bride was held. Afterward, the video shows Clapton playing his solo on the acoustic guitar. The video ends with Clapton sitting in front of the white church, as he did in the beginning of the shoot.

The music video was produced by Luke Scott and directed by Richard Goldstein for Warner Music Entertainment, which released the video in high-definition picture on both the VHS and DVD of Clapton Chronicles: The Best of Eric Clapton. The music video "Blue Eyes Blue" reached number nineteen on VH1's most-played music video chart in the United States.

== Track listing ==
CD Maxi single
No.	Title	Writer(s)	Producer(s)	Length
1.	"Blue Eyes Blue" (Album Version)	Diane Warren	Rob Cavallo	4:43
2.	"Circus" (Album Version, from Pilgrim)	Eric Clapton	Eric Clapton · Simon Climie	4:10
3.	"Wonderful Tonight" (Live, from 24 Nights)	Eric Clapton	Russ Titelman	5:25
4.	"Blue Eyes Blue" (Edit)	Diane Warren	Rob Cavallo	4:19
Total length:				18:37

== Reception ==
Billboard magazine's music critic Catherine Applefeld Olson calles the release a hot adult contemporary song. Another critic for the magazine, Paul Verna, reviews: "Clapton turns in a silky performance – reminiscent of his Babyface collaboration 'Change the World' of the Diane Warren tune".

AllMusic critic Stephen Thomas Erlewine thinks, "Blue Eyes Blue" makes the soundtrack to the film Runaway Bride a "crowd-pleaser" and "actually stronger than the average soundtrack of its ilk".

The single debuted at number twenty-five on the Billboard Adult Contemporary chart, where it stayed a total of twenty-six weeks on chart, even gaining an Airpower recognition while charting in the second week, eventually peaking at number four on the Billboard chart.

The single did not reach the Billboard Hot 100 singles chart, but peaked at number 112 on the magazine's Bubbling Under Hot 100 chart, selling a total of 100,837 copies while on the chart. "Blue Eyes Blue" also reached number twenty-nine on Billboard magazine's Adult Top 40 chart, where the release stayed for seven weeks.

In Canada, the single reached number thirty on RPM magazine's Top Singles sales chart, selling 1,064 copies in its first week on chart. In addition, the pop single peaked at number two on the magazine's Adult Contemporary track chart, and reached position forty-seven on the chart's 1999 year-end compilation.

In Europe, the single was a medium successful release, reaching only number 94 on the British singles chart, where the release stayed one week in the charts, selling just 9,322 copies.

In Germany, the release peaked at number 84 on the Media Control singles chart and stayed a total of five weeks on the nation's singles chart.

In Portugal, the release reached the Top 10, peaking at number six on its second charting week and was certified with a Gold disc by the Associação Fonográfica Portuguesa, commemorating the sale of more than 20,000 copies in the country. In total, the single stayed thirteen weeks on the Portuguese Top 40 singles chart.

In Finland, the single spent a total of four weeks on the country's singles chart and peaked at number five on its second week on chart.

In Spain, "Blue Eyes Blue" reached its highest European position on the singles chart, peaking at number three in August 1999. It was also presented a Platinum certification by the Productores de Música de España for outstanding singles sales of more than 50,000 copies.

In Japan, the single peaked at number ten on Oricon's Top Maxi Singles sales chart and reached number five on the Japanese Hot 100 singles chart. "Blue Eyes Blue" also topped the nation's international singles chart for one week and placed itself on number forty-five on the chart's 1999 year-end compilation. The single was certified gold by the Recording Industry Association of Japan for sales exceeding 50,000 copies.

In total, the single "Blue Eyes Blue" sold more than 500,000 copies worldwide.

== Charts ==
=== Weekly charts ===
Chart (1999)	Peak position
Canadian Adult Contemporary (RPM)	2
Canadian Top Singles (RPM)	30
Finland (Suomen virallinen lista)	5
Germany (GfK)	84
Japan (International Top Singles)	1
Japan (Oricon Hot 100 Singles)	5
Japan (Oricon Top Maxi Singles)	10
Portugal (AFP)	6
Spain (PROMUSICAE)	3
Tokio Hot 100 (J-Wave)	1
UK Singles (Official Charts)	94
US Adult Contemporary (Billboard)	4
US Adult Pop Airplay (Billboard)	29
US Bubbling Under Hot 100 (Billboard)	112

=== Year-end charts ===
Chart (1999)	Position
Canadian Adult Contemporary (RPM)	47
Japan (International Top Singles)	45

== Certifications ==
Region	Certification	Certified units/sales
Japan (RIAJ)	Gold	
Spain (Promusicae)	Platinum	50,000^{^}
^{^} Shipments figures based on certification alone.

== Release history ==
Region	Year	Formats	Label	Ref.
Australia	1999	CD single	Reprise (Warner)	
Canada	1999	CD single	Reprise (Warner)	
Finland	1999	CD single	Reprise (Warner)	
Germany	1999	CD single	Reprise (Warner)	
Japan	1999	CD single	Reprise (Warner)	
Malaysia	1999	CD single	Reprise (Warner)	
Portugal	1999	CD single	Reprise (Warner)	
Spain	1999	CD single	Reprise (Warner)	
United Kingdom	1999	CD single	Reprise (Warner)	
United States	1999	CD single	Reprise (Warner)	

== Cover versions ==
In the same year as Clapton's version, Dutch artist René Froger released his version on his 1999 album I Don't Break Easy.
