= Change the World =

1996 song by Wynonna Judd

Song by Wynonna Judd

from the album Revelations
- Released: February 13, 1996
- Genre: Country
- Length: 3:16
- Label: Curb; MCA
- Songwriters: Tommy Sims; Gordon Kennedy; Wayne Kirkpatrick
- Producer: Tony Brown

Audio
- "Change the World - Wynonna Judd" Video on YouTube

"Change the World"

Single by Eric Clapton

from the album Phenomenon
- B-side: "Danny Boy"
- Released: July 8, 1996
- Genre: Acoustic rock
- Length: 3:54
- Label: Reprise
- Songwriters: Tommy Sims; Gordon Kennedy; Wayne Kirkpatrick
- Producer: Kenneth "Babyface" Edmonds

Eric Clapton singles chronology
| "Love Can Build a Bridge" (1995) | "Change the World" (1996) | "My Father's Eyes" (1998) |

Music video
- "Change the World - Eric Clapton" on YouTube

"Change the World" is a song written by Tommy Sims, Gordon Kennedy, and Wayne Kirkpatrick and recorded by country music artist Wynonna Judd. A later version was recorded by English singer Eric Clapton for the soundtrack of the 1996 film Phenomenon. Clapton's version was produced by R&B record producer Kenneth "Babyface" Edmonds.

The Clapton release was recorded for Reprise and Warner Bros. Records. While reaching the top 40 in twenty countries, it topped the charts in Canada as well. The Clapton version also registered as Billboard magazine's Adult Contemporary and Adult Top 40 charts in the United States. The single won eight awards, including three Grammy Awards at the 39th annual ceremony in 1997.

== Background and recording ==
In an interview with American Songwriter, Gordon Kennedy retold the recording history of the song:

"Change the World" was a song written over a year by Tommy Sims, Wayne Kirkpatrick, and myself. On a recording session in Quad Studios in Nashville, in the early '90s, Wayne and I were recording some demos in an attempt to do the "artist" thing. We recorded four songs that day, three of which wound up on Garth Brooks' the Life of Chris Gaines (this would happen several years later).

During that session, Tommy was there playing bass and played us the nugget of an idea he had, wondering if it might be something that would work for the sound we were doing. He had the title and a chord progression and melody direction going. Wayne would ask him some months later for a tape of the idea so he could work on it. He wrote the lyrics to the chorus and all but one line of the second verse. Then, it went dormant again for a time before I asked Wayne about its progress. He gave me what he'd done on it. I finished writing the music, went to Columbus, Ohio, and laid down a demo track with Tommy. He was there working on a church choir album.

On the way home, I listened to a tape of the track and dictated lyrics into another little handheld recorder (I still have the micro-cassette!). I wrote the lyrics to the first verse and the missing line in the second verse. When I got home, I went into the studio and did a guitar practice and all of the vocals for a finished demo, the one Clapton heard later. None of the three of us were together when we wrote what we each wrote on the song.

Although some of the recordings took place in London, most of the song's recording was conducted in Record Plant studios in Los Angeles where basic rhythm tracks were recorded, starting with John "JR" Robinson on drums and Dean Parks on acoustic guitar. In a later session, more instruments were added, with Nathan East on bass, Michael Thompson on guitar, Greg Phillinganes on synthesizers, and Luis Conte on percussion. East recalls that the recording sessions were jam-packed because several internationally successful artists wanted to work with Babyface at the time; however, the pop producer put Clapton and "Change the World" first.

In 2013, Clapton explained his take on the song in an interview with Mojo magazine:

When I heard Tommy Sims' demo, I could hear Paul McCartney doing that, so I needed to, with greatest respect to Paul, take that and put it somewhere black. So I asked Babyface who, even though he may not be aware of it, gave it the blues thing. The first two lines I play on that song on the acoustic guitar are lines I quote wherever I can, and they come from the beginning of "Mannish Boy" by Muddy Waters. On every record I make where I think, this has got a chance of doing well, I make sure I pay my dues on this. So I think I've found a way to do it. Still, it has to have one foot in the blues, even if it's subtly disguised.

Personnel on the production end of recording sessions included Brad Gilderman and Thomas Russo as the recording engineers, Robbie Robertson as the soundtrack's producer, Mick Guzauski as a helper for the final mix, Babyface as producer for "Change the World" (single mix and instrumental version), and Clapton as producer for the record's b-side "Danny Boy." All recording actions were overseen by music supervisor Kathy Nelson. The music mastering for the 1996 single release was done at Oasis Mastering in Burbank, California.

== Composition ==
"Change the World"
"Change the World" (studio version) from the Phenomenon soundtrack.

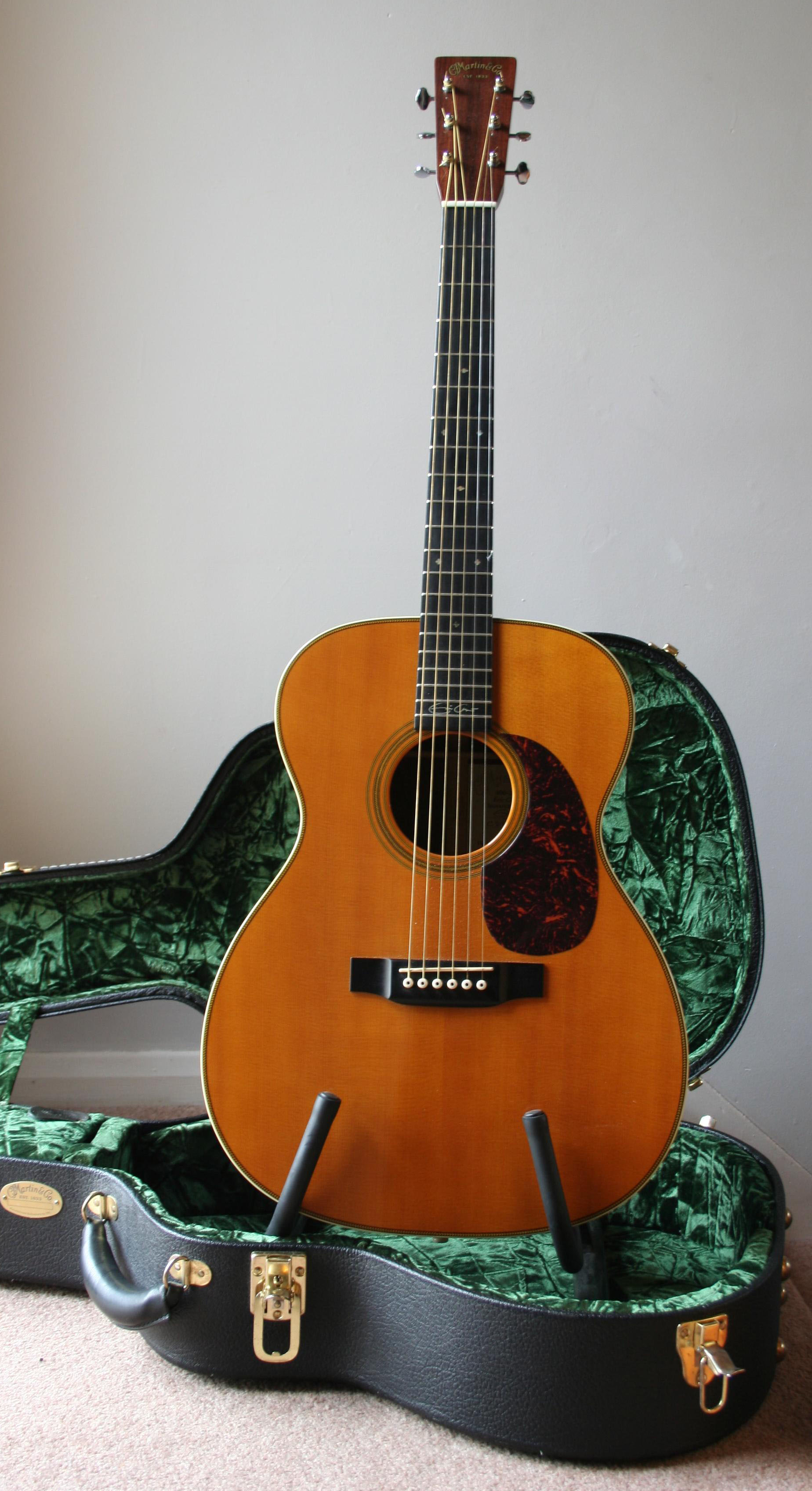
Clapton used a Martin acoustic guitar for the recording and music video.

Matthew Greenwald of AllMusic noted that the song is "melodic, soulful [and] catchy", due to its folk-pop and acoustic-based conception. Billboard magazine's Paul Verna felt the song also features Christian music styles. In the song, the performer expresses his desire to communicate his love to an unnamed woman ("If I could reach the stars, I'd pull one down for you," "If I could be king, even for a day, I'd take you as my queen, I'd have it no other way"). This love, he fears, will go unrequited without a drastic change in his life ("That this love I have inside, is everything it seems, But for now I find, it's only in my dreams," "And our love will rule, in this kingdom we have made, Till then I'd be a fool, wishing for the day").

Elton John's lyricist, Bernie Taupin, who worked with Clapton and John on the 1992 single release "Runaway Train," uses this track as an example of a song that can succeed without a great title or lyric. He told Musician magazine: "What sold that song, I believe, is production. And it had a good melody. But don't listen to the lyrics. Because the lyric is appalling. It's a bad lyric. There are some rhymes in there that are awful. But that's not what sold the song".

The song is written in the key of E major.

"Change the World" begins with an intro, which features a chord progression of E^{7}, E major, E6sus4, E^{7}, E6sus4, and E major chords played around the E-based bass line, which later turns into a E major, F-sharp minor, and G major bass line. The intro is followed by the first verse, which is accompanied by the intro chord progression and an A major, A6sus4, A^{7}, A^{7}, A6sus4, and A major chord progression for the B-section of the verse. After the E-major chord progression, including 6th and 7th chords, was played again, it ends with a G^{#7} chord, leading to the C-section of every verse, consisting of an F^{#}m^{7}, G^{#7}, C^{#}m, D#m7-5, G^{#7}, C^{#}m, D#m7-5, G^{#7}, C^{#}m^{7}, Cm^{7}, Bm^{7}, A, E/G^{#}, E/G^{#}, Gdim, and F^{#}m ending to the E major chord.

The first verse is followed by an interlude, which is identical to the first intro line. The accompaniment to the second verse and second chorus is identical to the ones before. A link is added with the lyric "Baby, if I could change the world," followed by Clapton's guitar solo, in which he played alongside an E minor blues scale, ending his solo with the G sharp major pentatonic scale. After the solo, the chorus is repeated, now starting with the line "If I could change the world...", leading to the second link, which is repeated three times before the song's outro, which is identical to the song's intro and interlude.

== Release ==
Before Clapton's hit version was released, the song was recorded by country artist Wynonna Judd for her February 1996 album, Revelations (MCA Records). Her three-minute, nineteen-second take on the song is more of a neo-traditionalist country music track. Judd did not release her version as a single. Judd's interpretation was also released on the compilation album Best of America, Volume 2 for Curb Records on June 3, 2003.

Eric Clapton's version of the song was released on July 8, 1996, on 7-inch vinyl, compact music cassette, and compact disc formats. It was later made available as a digital download single. The publishing rights of Clapton's recordings belong to Warner Chappell Music, although the lyric writing license is owned by the Universal Music Publishing Group. The 1996 single was released and distributed through Reprise and Warner Bros. Records for worldwide territories. The title was also included on the Phenomenon soundtrack album, released by Reprise Records in June 1996.

On February 11, 1997, "Change the World" was included on the 1997 Grammy Nominees compilation album, where it was featured alongside other Grammy nominated and winning songs, including "Give Me One Reason" by Tracy Chapman and "Because You Loved Me" by Celine Dion. On February 2, 1999, the song was released by Warner Bros. Records as an extended play, accompanied by Clapton's 1998 studio effort Pilgrim.

On October 12, 1999, the pop single was released as part of the number-one compilation album Clapton Chronicles: The Best of Eric Clapton for Reprise Records. On September 11, 2001, the song was released on the Clapton Chronicles: The Best of Eric Clapton and Unplugged double compilation for Warner Music Entertainment. It was also released on Warner Bros. Records' Japan-only compilation album Ballads two years after, on December 23, 2003.

On October 9, 2007, "Change the World" was released on the Complete Clapton compilation for Reprise and Polydor Records, accompanying the release of Clapton's best-selling autobiography. It was also part of the Ultimate Grammy Collection, celebrating contemporary pop music hits, released on November 27, 2007, for Shout! Factory. On April 28, 2015, the pop title was released on Clapton's compilation album Forever Man, which recognized his biggest hits.

In total, Eric Clapton's version of "Change the World" has been featured on over 20 releases, including extended plays and various artists compilation albums, produced by both Reprise and Warner Bros.Records.

== Critical reception ==
AllMusic critic Matthew Greenwald wrote that Clapton "smartly realized his strength in acoustic-based, soulful folk-pop and cut this fabulous side with noted producer Babyface" after the success of Unplugged and "Tears in Heaven." Greenwald called the song's homespun quality and overall sense of reality refreshing, writing that the release's "folksy melodic hook and soulful turnaround in the catchy chorus are handled by Clapton admirably here and, more importantly, with honesty and an artless grace." He rated the single 2.5 of five stars.

Music journalist Frank Merschmeier wrote for his review on the official Swiss Hitparade chart that the song is "without question a definitive lovesong" and praised the religious background note of the song. The German newspaper Süddeutsche Zeitung awarded the single four out of five stars. Journalist Violetta Schranke called "Change the World" a "beautiful pop song" with "delicate production," "guitar artwork," and "fantastic bluesy singing," while also praising Babyface's background vocals.

In Billboard magazine, Datu Faison wrote that the recording is a perfect example of how music has the power to unite musicians of different genres, nations, and backgrounds, calling the track "great." Larry Flick of Billboard noted: "Pairing rock hero Clapton with pop/soul maestro Babyface may seem totally incongruous; however, one listen to this positively electric single, and you will be hoping for the two to collaborate on an entire album." He added that working with a "sweet, uplifting lyric and melody," Clapton brings "worldly acoustic-blues favor to the table, while Babyface injects a splash of modern soul and pop gloss."

== Awards and nominations ==
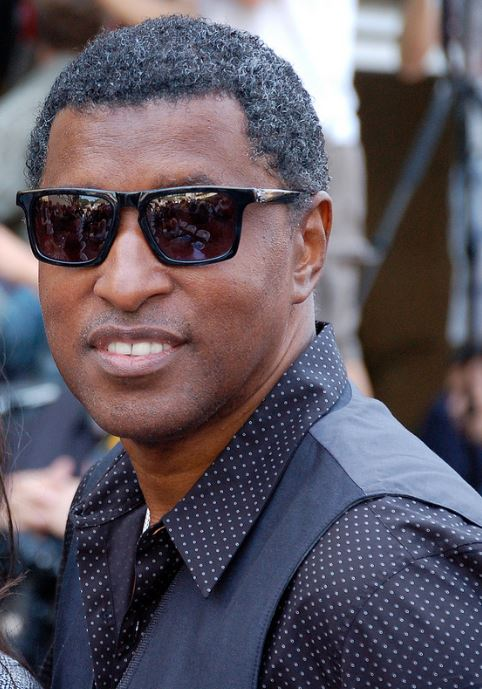
Babyface's production was praised by fans and critics.

| Year | Ceremony | Award | Result | Ref. |
|---|---|---|---|---|
| 1996 | Billboard | Most Played Radio Songs of Year | #13 | |
| 1996 | CRIA | Record of the Year | Won | |
| 1997 | ASCAP Award | Most Performed Songs from Motion Pictures | Won | |
| 1997 | BMI Film & TV Awards | Most Performed Song from a Film | Won | |
| 1997 | Grammy Awards | Song of the Year | Won | |
| 1997 | Grammy Awards | Record of the Year | Won | |
| 1997 | Grammy Awards | Best Male Pop Vocal Performance | Won | |
| 1997 | MTV Movie Awards | Best Movie Song | Nominated | |
| 1997 | Nashville Music Award | Song of the Year | Won | |
| 1997 | OFTA Award | Best Adapted Song | Nominated | |
| 1998 | Q | Best Rediscovered Track | Won | |
| 1999 | RIAA | Songs of the Century | #270 | |
| 2015 | WHTZ | Top 100 Songs of 1996 | #22 | |

== Chart performance ==
=== North America and Oceania ===
The RIAA gold record award.

"Change the World" is one of Clapton's best-selling singles alongside "I Shot the Sheriff", "Forever Man", "Wonderful Tonight", "Tears in Heaven", "Layla", "Cocaine", "Bad Love" and "Lay Down Sally". The title was a global Top 40 phenomenon, reaching the single sales charts in more than twenty countries and staying in the charts for two years in a row, from 1996 to 1998. In the United States, the song was a big hit, becoming his 6th and last top 10 hit on the Billboard charts. The single debuted on the Billboard Hot 100 in the middle of 1996 at number 55 with sales of more than 3,000 copies, gaining a so-called "Hot Shot Debut". Eventually peaking at position number five, the release was certified with a Gold Disc, just three months after its release, by the Recording Industry Association of America (RIAA), selling more than 500,000 copies while on charts in America. The single stayed on the Billboard Hot 100 chart for 43 weeks and sold more than 700,000 copies by the end of 1996.

"Change the World" peaked at number four on the Cashbox chart and sold more than 895,000 copies by August 1997. Also, the track debuted with a "Hot Shot/Airpower" certification on the Adult Contemporary and Adult Top 40 charts. The release topped the Adult Top 40 chart, where it stayed on the charts for 38 weeks and also spent 13 weeks at number one on the adult contemporary chart, remaining on that chart for over a year and a half (81 weeks), a feat which was extraordinarily rare at the time. In addition, the single peaked at number two on the Mainstream Top 40 chart. By July 1998, "Change the World" sold more than one million copies in the United States alone.

"Change the World" was also well received in the R&B and Hip hop scene, spending twenty weeks on the Hot R&B/Hip-Hop Songs chart and eventually reaching position 54 and number 20 on the Hot R&B Singles Sales chart in the United States. The pop-rock tune also received a lot of airplay in North America, reaching number two on the Hot 100 Airplay chart in 1996 and peaking at position three on the Hot 100 Recurrent Airplay chart in 1997. "Change the World" was the 13th most played song of 1996 by American radio stations all over the country. For the year-end of 1996, the single's release placed itself at number seven on the adult contemporary chart, number two on the Adult Top 40, number twelve on the Hot 100 Airplay chart, and number 34 on the Top 100 Single Sales chart. In 1997, the single's sales went down. However, the track was still successful until the end of the year, peaking at number two on the year-end's Adult Contemporary, ranking at number ten on the Top Soundtrack Singles chart, as well as being the 67th most purchased single and 55th most radio played song in the United States.

In Canada, the single's release topped both the RPM magazine's Adult Contemporary Tracks and Top Singles chart in July and August 1996. In The Record magazine's compilation, the single peaked at number ten on the singles chart in 1996. Here, the release reached the 1996 year-end charts, placing itself at number two on the adult contemporary chart and number three on the Top Singles compilation. In Australia, "Change the World" charted at number eight on the ARIA singles chart. In New Zealand, the pop single peaked at number three on the official single chart and was certified Gold by the Recording Industry Association of New Zealand (RIANZ) for sales of more than 7,500 copies in New Zealand. It was New Zealand's 37th best-selling single of 1996.

=== Asia, South America and Europe ===
When a single maxi version of the single was released in early 1997, it peaked at number seven on the Japanese albums chart, compiled by Oricon. In 2015, the song reached Billboard magazine's Japan Hot 100, where the song peaked at number 48.

The single's release as "Change the World" was well received by British radio stations, where the song peaked at number six on the Official Charts Company's airplay compilation in 1996. The hit single had two chart runs in the United Kingdom, the first saw the single peak at number 18 and stay for five weeks on the British charts from July 20, 1996, to August 17, 1996. From September 21, 1996, to October 5, 1996, "Change the World" had a second chart run of three weeks on low positions (89,100 and 98), charting a total of eight weeks in the United Kingdom. In Scotland, the single peaked at number 20 on the Official Charts Company's separate single chart for the country.

Although "Change the World" reached the Top 40 in every European country it charted in, the Clapton single was only a medium success. In Austria, the single peaked at number ten on the Ö3 Austria Top 40 chart. In Flanders, the single reached number nine on the Ultratop Tipparade, and position 27 on the Ultratop single sales chart in Wallonia, where it was the 90th best-selling single release of the year. On the French Singles chart, "Change the World" peaked at number seven and was certified with a Gold Disc by the Syndicat National de l'Édition Phonographique (SNEP) for sales figures above the 250,000 mark. In Germany, the single reached number 30 on the Media Control chart. In the Netherlands, "Change the World" placed itself on both the Dutch Top 40, peaking at number 39, and the Single Top 100 chart, where it reached position 24. In Norway, the release peaked at number 15 on the VG-lista chart. In Sweden, the single reached number 22 on the Topplistan chart. In Switzerland, "Change the World" reached position number 21 on the country's Schweizer Hitparade.

== Music video ==
A shot of Clapton in the video.

The music video was filmed at Hoboken Terminal in Hoboken, Hudson County, New Jersey. For the music video shooting, Clapton was provided with clothing, glasses, shoes and styling equipment by his long-time friend, Italian fashion designer Giorgio Armani. In the music video, Clapton is shown singing and playing "Change the World" at the Hoboken Terminal, either using an early signature Martin acoustic guitar, or a vintage model. The song's producer Babyface is rarely seen playing and singing the pop song in front of the camera. While Clapton and Babyface are performing the song at one of New York metropolitan area's major transportation hubs, the scene is completely empty of both people and obstacles. Every once in a while, the performers and passengers, who come later to the terminal, disappear and appear as the director of the video uses an obliterate video effect. The video was originally released in 4:3 format and was re-sized in 1999 to a high-definition picture. The music video gained a lot of popularity, especially in the United States, topping the music video streaming chart of VH1 in October 1996. The release also reached number four on MuskVideo's power play chart, and peaked at number nine on the most played videos of MTV compilation as reported by Billboard.

== Live performances ==
Although "Change the World" is best known by Eric Clapton's unplugged acoustic version, an electric performance of the song was featured on Babyface's 1997 live album, MTV Unplugged NYC 1997, released on November 25 the same year, with Clapton on co-lead vocals and electric guitar. Babyface also served as the song's producer for the electric guitar take. This interpretation of the hit song has a seven-minute and 33 second duration. AllMusic critic Stephen Thomas Erlewine said the duo "deliver[s the tune] with a smooth authority that borders on slickness". The Babyface-featuring Eric Clapton version was also released on the two compilation albums A Collection of His Greatest Hits and Wake Up Everybody in 2000 and 2004, respectively. On February 27, 1997, Clapton and Babyface performed the song at the 39th Annual Grammy Awards at Madison Square Garden. The live album One More Car, One More Rider was recorded during their 2001 tour at Los Angeles' Staples Center on August 18 and 19, 2001, also featuring a live interpretation of the song. Due to fan and TV recordings around the globe, the song was often illegally released on bootleg.

== Track listings ==
- All songs written and composed by Tommy Sims, Gordon Kennedy and Wayne Kirkpatrick, except where noted.

7" vinyl and cassette single
| No. | Title | Length |
|---|---|---|
| 1. | "Change the World" | 3:54 |
| 2. | "Danny Boy" | 4:14 |
| Total length: | | 8:18 |

CD maxi single
| No. | Title | Length |
|---|---|---|
| 1. | "Change the World" | 3:54 |
| 2. | "Danny Boy" | 4:14 |
| 3. | "Change the World (Instrumental)" | 3:54 |
| Total length: | | 12:02 |

== Charts ==
=== Weekly charts ===
| Chart (1996–1997) | Peak position |
|---|---|
| Australia (ARIA) | 8 |
| Austria (Ö3 Austria Top 40) | 10 |
| Belgium (Ultratip Bubbling Under Flanders) | 9 |
| Belgium (Ultratop 50 Wallonia) | 27 |
| Canada (Nielsen SoundScan) | 8 |
| Canada Top Singles (RPM) | 1 |
| Canada Adult Contemporary (RPM) | 1 |
| European Adult Contemporary (Nielsen) | 2 |
| France (SNEP) | 7 |
| Germany (GfK) | 30 |
| Iceland (Íslenski Listinn Topp 40) | 17 |
| Italian Airplay Singles (Nielsen) | 10 |
| Japanese Maxi Singles (Oricon) | 7 |
| Netherlands (Dutch Top 40) | 39 |
| Netherlands (Single Top 100) | 24 |
| New Zealand (Recorded Music NZ) | 3 |
| Norway (VG-lista) | 15 |
| Polish Airplay Singles (Nielsen) | 3 |
| Scottish Singles Sales (Official Charts) | 20 |
| Spanish Airplay Singles (Nielsen) | 7 |
| Sweden (Sverigetopplistan) | 22 |
| Switzerland (Schweizer Hitparade) | 21 |
| Taiwan (IFPI) | 5 |
| UK Singles (Official Charts) | 18 |
| UK Airplay Singles (Official Charts Company) | 6 |
| US Billboard Hot 100 | 5 |
| US Adult Alternative Airplay (Billboard) | 1 |
| US Adult Contemporary (Billboard) | 1 |
| US Adult Pop Airplay (Billboard) | 1 |
| US Hot R&B/Hip-Hop Songs (Billboard) | 54 |
| US Pop Airplay (Billboard) | 2 |
| US Cash Box Top Singles | 4 |

| Chart (2015) | Peak position |
|---|---|
| Japan Hot 100 (Billboard) | 48 |

=== Year-end charts ===
| Chart (1996) | Position |
|---|---|
| Belgium (Ultratop 50 Wallonia) | 90 |
| Canada Top Singles (RPM) | 3 |
| Canada Adult Contemporary (RPM) | 2 |
| Iceland (Íslenski Listinn Topp 40) | 94 |
| New Zealand (RIANZ) | 37 |
| US Billboard Hot 100 | 19 |
| US Adult Contemporary (Billboard) | 7 |
| US Adult Top 40 (Billboard) | 2 |
| US Top 40/Mainstream (Billboard) | 15 |
| US Triple-A (Billboard) | 16 |

| Chart (1997) | Position |
|---|---|
| US Billboard Hot 100 | 67 |
| US Adult Contemporary (Billboard) | 2 |
| US Adult Top 40 (Billboard) | 36 |
| US Top Soundtrack Singles (Billboard) | 10 |

=== Decade-end charts ===
Decade-end chart performance for "Change the World"
| Chart (1990–1999) | Position |
|---|---|
| Canada (Nielsen SoundScan) | 58 |

== Certifications ==
| Region | Certification | Certified units/sales |
|---|---|---|
| France (SNEP) | Gold | 250,000^{*} |
| Japan (RIAJ) Physical sales | 2× Platinum | 200,000^{^} |
| Japan (RIAJ) Change the World / Tears in Heaven | Platinum | 100,000^{^} |
| Japan (RIAJ) Digital single | Platinum | 250,000^{*} |
| Japan (RIAJ) Ringtone | Gold | 100,000^{*} |
| New Zealand (RMNZ) | Gold | 15,000^{‡} |
| United States (RIAA) | Gold | 1,000,000 |
^{*} Sales figures based on certification alone.^{^} Shipments figures based on certification alone.^{‡} Sales+streaming figures based on certification alone.

== Cover versions ==
The American saxophonist Alto Reed covered the song in a jazzier feel for his debut album Cool Breeze, released on November 11, 1997, for Alto Reed Records. The Jamaican reggae singer Eustace "Thriller U" Hamilton covered the song in 2000 and released his interpretation of "Change the World" as a single. For their 15th single "Wings of Words", J-pop group CHEMISTRY did their rendition of the song. As the B-side to the single, "Change the World" charted at number two on the Oricon Hot 100 singles chart and sold more than 140,000 copies while on the chart. British musical theatre star and recording artist Elaine Paige recorded the song as one of the brand new tracks on her 2004 greatest hits compilation Centre Stage: The Very Best of Elaine Paige.

== Release history ==
| Region | Year | Formats | Label | Ref. |
|---|---|---|---|---|
| Australia | 1996 | CD single | Reprise (Warner) | |
| Austria | 1996 | 7" vinyl; CD single | Reprise (Warner) | |
| Belgium | 1996 | 7" vinyl; CD single | Reprise (Warner) | |
| Brazil | 1996 | CD single | Reprise (Warner) | |
| Canada | 1996 | CD single | Reprise (Warner) | |
| France | 1996 | 7" vinyl; CD single | Reprise (Warner) | |
| Germany | 1996 | 7" vinyl; CD single | Reprise (Warner) | |
| Italy | 1996 | 7" vinyl; CD single | Reprise (Warner) | |
| Japan | 1996 | CD single | Reprise (Warner) | |
| Netherlands | 1996 | 7" vinyl; CD single | Reprise (Warner) | |
| New Zealand | 1996 | 7" vinyl; CD single | Reprise (Warner) | |
| Norway | 1996 | 7" vinyl; CD single | Reprise (Warner) | |
| Spain | 1996 | 7" vinyl; CD single | Reprise (Warner) | |
| Sweden | 1996 | 7" vinyl; CD single | Reprise (Warner) | |
| Switzerland | 1996 | 7" vinyl; CD single | Reprise (Warner) | |
| Taiwan | 1996 | CD single | Reprise (Warner) | |
| United Kingdom | 1996 | 7" vinyl; CD single | Reprise (Warner) | |
| United States | 1996 | 7" vinyl; CD single; cassette single | Reprise (Warner) | |

- Note: Since September 4, 2012, "Change the World" is available worldwide as a digital download single.

== See also ==
- List of Billboard Adult Contemporary number ones of 1996
