= Born in Time =

1990 song by Bob Dylan

Song by Bob Dylan

from the album Under the Red Sky
- Released: September 10, 1990
- Recorded: March–May 1990
- Genre: Rock
- Length: 3:39
- Label: Columbia
- Songwriter: Bob Dylan
- Producers: Don Was; David Was; Bob Dylan ("Jack Frost")

Audio
- "Born in Time" (album version) by Bob Dylan on YouTube

"Born in Time" is a rock song written by American singer-songwriter Bob Dylan, who first released the track on September 10, 1990, on his twenty-seventh studio album Under the Red Sky. It is a reworking of a song originally recorded at the previous year's Oh Mercy sessions. The British recording artist Eric Clapton covered the song for his 1998 studio effort Pilgrim and released his take on the tune as a single. The song has been praised by critics for its catchy melody and romantic, dreamlike lyrics.

== Bob Dylan's versions ==
Dylan has officially released four different versions of the song: In addition to the version released on Under the Red Sky, he subsequently released two outtakes from the Oh Mercy sessions, recorded in 1989 and produced by Daniel Lanois, on The Bootleg Series Vol. 8: Tell Tale Signs: Rare and Unreleased 1989–2006 in 2008, and a live version from 1998 as the b-side to his single "Love Sick" from Time Out of Mind.

=== Reception ===
Spectrum Culture included the Under the Red Sky version on a list of "Bob Dylan's 20 Best Songs of the 1990s". In an article accompanying the list, critic Tyler Dunston calls it "particularly urgent" and notes that it is a track where, "as with many of Dylan’s greatest songs, his romanticism and his realism intersect". The Big Issue placed The Bootleg Series Vol. 8 version at #15 on a 2021 list of the "80 best Bob Dylan songs - that aren't the greatest hits" and noted that it signaled "a return to form after a rum decade" for the singer/songwriter.

A 2021 Guardian article included it on a list of "80 Bob Dylan songs everyone should know".

=== In live performance ===
Dylan performed the song 56 times on the Never Ending Tour between 1993 and 2003. One of these performances was a duet with Eric Clapton in New York City in 1999.

== Eric Clapton's version ==
"Born in Time"

Single by Eric Clapton

from the album Pilgrim
- Released: July 10, 1998
- Genre: Soft rock
- Length: 4:42
- Label: Reprise
- Songwriter: Bob Dylan
- Producers: Eric Clapton; Simon Climie

Eric Clapton singles chronology
"Circus" (1998)	"Born in Time" (1998)	"Pilgrim" (1998)

Audio
- "Born in Time" by Eric Clapton on YouTube

Audio sample
- file; help

The British rock musician Eric Clapton covered Dylan's original release, adding his Pilgrim-style arrangements to the track. Clapton plays the song in the key of E major. The British recording artist adds a Distortion effect while playing the rhythm guitar pattern with his signature Fender Stratocaster. In between some lyrical lines and for his guitar solo, Clapton uses a Dobro, playing with the slide guitar technique. The background vocals and synthesizers on the recording create a string orchestra sound and feel. The recording was produced by Clapton himself along with his long-time collaborator record producer Simon Climie.

=== Track listing ===
Compact disc single
No.	Title	Writer(s)	Producer(s)	Length
1.	"Born in Time" (Album Version)	Bob Dylan	Eric Clapton · Simon Climie	4:42
2.	"Born in Time" (Remix Edit)	Bob Dylan	Eric Clapton · Simon Climie	3:59
3.	"Wonderful Tonight" (Live)	Eric Clapton	Russ Titelman	5:25
4.	"Tears in Heaven"	Eric Clapton · Will Jennings	Russ Titelman	4:32
Total length:				18:38

=== Reception ===
Entertainment Weekly critic David Browne notes pop record producer Kenneth "Babyface" Edmonds humming the backing vocals to the tune on the Pilgrim studio album, giving it a R&B feel. Journalist David Wild from Rolling Stone likes Clapton's interpretation of this "overlooked Dylan tune". The compact disc single was not that successful in the charts, reaching only number 88 in Germany, where the single release stayed for eight weeks on the official German single charts. In the Czech Republic, the CD single was purchased more than one thousand times in the first week, making it Clapton's only single in the Republic, gaining a silver disc for outstanding sales figures.

=== Weekly charts ===
Chart (1998)	Peak position
Germany (GfK)	88

=== Certifications ===
Region	Certification
Czech Republic (ČNS IFPI)	Silver

== Other versions ==
- Robyn Hitchcock covered the song on his 2020 album The Man Downstairs: Demos & Rarities.
- Indigenous covered the song on their 2006 album Chasing The Sun.
