= The Iguanas (Louisiana band) =

Rock band from New Orleans

The Iguanas is a roots rock band from New Orleans, Louisiana, United States, formed in 1989. Their sound has been described as combining Chicano rock, R&B, Conjunto tejano and various Latin styles into a deep groove.

The song "Boom, Boom, Boom", from their 1994 album Nuevo Boogaloo, was featured in the Homicide: Life on the Street episode "The Documentary". Nuevo Boogaloo hit #34 on the US Billboard Heatseekers chart in 1994. The song "Para Donde Vas" from their 1993 self-titled debut album was included on the soundtrack of the 1996 film Phenomenon. The group also appeared in Robert Mugge's 2006 documentary New Orleans Music in Exile, in which they talked about how Hurricane Katrina affected them. The band released a studio album titled Sin To Sin on PFAM in April, 2012.

== Discography ==
- El Orangutan / Te Vas Manana 45 (Iguana Music 001) 1991
- The Iguanas (MCA Records, 1993)
- Nuevo Boogaloo (Margaritaville Records, 1994)
- Super Ball (Margaritaville Records, 1996)
- Sugartown (Koch Records, 1999)
- Live Iguanas (Blowout Records, 2002)
- Plastic Silver 9-Volt Heart (Yep Roc, 2003)
- If You Should Ever Fall on Hard Times (Yep Roc, 2008)
- Sin To Sin (PFAM Records, 2013)
- Juarez (PFAM Records, 2014)
