= Pilgrim (Eric Clapton song) =

- Mexican single cover.

Single by Eric Clapton

from the album Pilgrim
- A-side: "Pilgrim (Mick Guzauski remix)"
- Released: November 1998
- Genre: Pop · pop rock
- Length: 5:50
- Label: Reprise · Warner
- Songwriter(s): Clapton · Climie
- Producer(s): Clapton · Climie

Eric Clapton singles chronology
"Born in Time" (1998)	"Pilgrim" (1998)	"Blue Eyes Blue" (1999)

"Pilgrim" is a pop rock song written by the British musicians Eric Clapton and Simon Climie. The duo also produced the song, which came about after a jam session between the two in the late 1990s. The title was recorded for Clapton's 1998 studio album Pilgrim and was released as the fourth and final single of the album. The song was always released as a B-side to another single and was accompanied by a music video. It is part of the Lethal Weapon 4 soundtrack.

== Writing and composition ==
The song is written and recorded in the keys A minor and C major. In 1998, Clapton talked about the composition and writing process on "Pilgrim" a song like "Inside of Me" that was deliberately borrowed from Curtis Mayfield as a way for Clapton to say thanks for the inspiration: "I was playing guitar and Simon [Climie] was playing keyboards and we just created an atmosphere and instantly the words were coming into my head because the mood evoked all of the circumstances that had been happening for the past few years... not judgmental... it states what had had been happening in a very gentle loving way. This was an actual event in my life where people were saying to me 'Look you've got to get out of this. You've got to let go. You've got to move on'. There was an endless vicious circle of make-ups, break-ups, make-ups, and it went on for years and it was going nowhere. It was very painful but I was obsessed with the notion that it would come to fruition if I just stayed there long enough. I'm sure we've all been there – but this time for me it was different. That's another one of the things where I can say that if I just stay there it will come good and it didn't. We used drum loops... turned to technology when we ran out of things to do and needed a place to start. We would say something like 'uh, well, um, have you heard the new Usher single?' And from there we'd just copy the drum program, dicker with it and play along with it. That's how the song "Pilgrim" was born. We came up with a drum program that was derived from a hit – I can't remember which one – we changed it a little and then wrote the words".

== Personnel ==
Musicians:

- Eric Clapton – lead vocals, guitar
- Paul Carrack – organ
- Simon Climie – synth bass (maybe), drum machine, backing vocals
- Chyna Whyne – backing vocals
- The London Session Orchestra – strings
- Nick Ingman – string arrangements

Technical:

- Eric Clapton – producer
- Simon Climie – producer
- Alan Douglas – engineer
- Adam Brown – assistant engineer
- Mick Guzauski – mixer

== Chart positions ==
=== Weekly charts ===
Chart (1998)	Peak position
Italy (Musica e dischi)	17

== Music video ==
A music video was released in 1998 to accompany the single release. The video is still being broadcast on TV networks like MTV, VH1 and Much Music. The music video was also released on the DVD to the 1999 compilation album Clapton Chronicles: The Best of Eric Clapton.
