= Pilgrim (Eric Clapton album) =

Studio album by Eric Clapton
- Released: 10 March 1998
- Recorded: 1997
- Studios: Ocean Way (Hollywood); Olympic (London)
- Genre: Rock
- Length: 75:33
- Label: Reprise
- Producers: Eric Clapton; Simon Climie

Eric Clapton chronology
| Crossroads 2 (1996) | Pilgrim (1998) | Blues (1999) |

Singles from Pilgrim
- 1. "My Father's Eyes" Released: 10 March 1998; 2. "She's Gone" Released: April 1998; 3. "Circus" Released: June 1998; 4. "Born in Time" Released: 10 July 1998; 5. "Pilgrim" Released: November 1998

Pilgrim is the thirteenth solo studio album by the British rock musician Eric Clapton, released on 10 March 1998 for Reprise Records. The album features all-new studio-recorded material, the first to do so since Clapton's 1989 hit album Journeyman and was nominated for several music awards. Although most of the critics responded negatively to the 1998 studio effort, it was one of Clapton's most commercially successful albums, reaching the Top 10 in twenty-two countries.

== Background ==
The album was recorded during 1997 in both Ocean Way and the Olympic Studios. The release of Pilgrim marked Clapton's first album of all-new original studio material since 1989's Journeyman album. When being interviewed by Larry King in February 1998, Clapton explained how the album title came to be: "Well, it's kind of – I suppose – there's a track on the album called 'Pilgrim' which came first. And when I came to title the album I used that track as a key point to go from, because I thought it was a good way of actually following the thread from Journeyman which was the same kind of meaning, really. Just looking at my life as a musician and a lot of other respects. It is autobiographical. And I see myself as kind of being like a lone guy on a quest". The album cover and packaging for Pilgrim was originally conceived by Clapton himself. However, Clapton ultimately commissioned Japanese artist Yoshiyuki Sadamoto, best known for his work on Nadia: The Secret of Blue Water and Neon Genesis Evangelion, to expand upon his concept and produce the final version of the album cover and packaging artwork. Clapton had become aware of Sadamoto not through his manga and anime work, but his 1993 art book Alpha.

In his 2007 autobiography, Clapton noted that he asked his drummer, Steve Gadd, how he would feel about making the saddest record of all time. Gadd said he could work on Clapton's idea and the British recording artist chose to start working on the new project, although Clapton felt it could be a worrying time recording the saddest record that has ever been made. Because "My Father's Eyes" and "Circus" were the only finished tunes Clapton had when going into the studio, he wrote several new songs stating he worked nearly a whole year every day and night to record good songs with perfect detail. Clapton calls Pilgrim one of his favourite albums because he put so much passion and hard work into making it. During that time, Clapton parted with his long-time manager Roger Forrester, mainly because Clapton took so long recording the album and paying too much money on the album, renting several studios for nearly a whole year.

== Composition ==
According to the music website AllMusic, the 1998 studio release belongs to the musical genres of both pop and rock music, in styles of album rock, contemporary pop and rock as well as adult contemporary music. Pilgrim brings, so the music website says, a slick, smooth, detached, laid-back, mellow, refined, reflective, stylish, sentimental and reserved mood with it. The Billboard magazine, however, thinks, the album definitely belongs to the music genre of pop music. The album experiments with drum machines and certain sounds like synthesizers, guitars, strings reminiscent of R&B music. The album features a lot of synth-keyboard sounds and a twenty-piece orchestra on some of the tunes. The music website CD Shakedown thinks the album is not rock and not blues, but full-on contemporary pop music. Rolling Stone calls the album's material a "loosely themed soul-song cycle in the tradition of Marvin Gaye [with] effective modern contexts".

Pilgrim features 14 tracks of a total 75 minutes and 33 seconds duration. Twelve of the album's tracks were either written completely alone by Clapton, or at least co-written by the British rock musician. The songs "Circus" and "My Father's Eyes" were written originally for Clapton's 1992 Unplugged live album. Although Clapton recorded both of the songs in the acoustic situation, he never officially released the recordings until the deluxe edition of the live album was released in 2013. In his autobiography, Clapton noted, the reason for the delayed release was because he felt the songs were not quite finished. The titles on Pilgrim are wide open musically, as the album includes acoustic-style tracks such as "Fall Like Rain", ballads like "Needs His Woman" and rock tracks like "She's Gone". "Broken Hearted", a song Clapton wrote with Greg Phillinganes, features synthesizers; it was performed as a live acoustic version during the Montserrat charity concert at the Royal Albert Hall in 1997. Clapton resurrected the song with John Mayer for the CNN Hurricane Relief on 3 September 2005. The album features only two cover versions of songs: "Born in Time", which was written by Bob Dylan and sent to Clapton by Dylan, as well as "Going Down Slow", a blues standard, written and recorded by St. Louis Jimmy Oden.

== Release and promotion ==
The album was released on 10 March 1998 under Reprise Records, a sublabel of Warner Bros. Records for worldwide territories on compact disc, grammophone record and music cassette. Over the years, Pilgrim was re-released in order to meet the ordering quantity. For example, in 2013, the record was re-released on 12" vinyl with better quality pressings, and was in 2014 re-released by Audio Fidelity Records as a Super Audio CD. The album was also released alongside "Change the World" as a so-called extended play on 2 February 1999 for WEA International. On 4 August 2008, Welt & Placket released the 1998 record along with 2001's Reptile as a double album. To help both the album and single sales, Clapton toured the United States and Europe between March and December 1998 on his Pilgrim World Tour, followed by the Japan leg of the tour in November 1999. In Germany, the tour was promoted by Volkswagen.

=== Singles ===
The first single off the Pilgrim album was "My Father's Eyes", which was released along with the B-side of the instrumental of "Inside of Me" as both a compact disc single and maxi compact disc single on 9 February 1998. The second single to be released was the rock title "She's Gone". Although the track was not released on either compact disc, digital, cassette or grammophone record formats, it was made available in April 1998 for radio stations as an airplay single. Two months later and three months after the album's official release, the third single, titled "Circus" was released as a compact disc release. The single was followed by "Born in Time", released on 10 July 1998, also on compact disc format. The album's last single, "Pilgrim", was released in November 1998.

== Critical reception ==
Professional ratings
Review scores
| Source | Rating |
|---|---|
| AllMusic | 2/5 stars |
| Robert Christgau | C+ |
| Entertainment Weekly | B− |
| Los Angeles Times | 2/4 stars |
| Music Week | 3/5 stars |
| Rolling Stone | 4/5 stars |

AllMusic critic Stephen Thomas Erlewine noted that the album "tries to reach a middle ground between the two extremes 'Tears in Heaven' and 'Change the World', balancing tortured lyrics with smooth sonic surfaces". Erlewine goes on in his review, criticising both Eric Clapton's and Simon Climie's production: "The problem lies in the production, which relies entirely on stiff mechanical drumbeats, gauzy synthesizers, and meandering instrumental interludes. These ingredients could result in a good record, as 'Change the World' demonstrated, but not here, due to [the album's] monotonous production". The music critic also notes Clapton's singing and playing is weird on Pilgrim, noting "Clapton doesn't want to shake things up – his singing is startlingly mannered, even on emotionally turbulent numbers like 'My Father's Eyes' or 'Circus'. Even worse, he's content to take a back seat instrumentally, playing slight solos and fills as colorless as the electronic backdrops". Comparing the album to the hit releases Journeyman, From the Cradle and Unplugged, Erlewine finishes his review for AllMusic, calling the 1998 studio effort full of "blandness" and "disappointing". Critics from the music website CD Shakedown positively note, the album "may put off some of Clapton's fans. But the gems are here, including the leadoff single, 'My Father's Eyes' and 'Circus' as [Pilgrim] delivers your money's worth [and has] high points". However, the reviewers criticize the album's plus 70 minutes length, finding it "more manageable if Clapton had released it as a double-disc package". Rolling Stone journalist David Wild recalls: "Pilgrim will not thrill those looking for From the Cradle II – most of this state-of-the-charts album sounds absolutely nothing like any record Muddy Waters ever made. But it's still a blues album in the sense that it captures the sound of a man trying to tame hellhounds from within and without. In the end, Pilgrim is not purely anything, except purely moving". He awarded the release four out of five possible stars. Natalie Nichols from the Los Angeles Times rates Pilgrim with two out of four possible stars, reviewing it with the predicate "fair" and thinks the majority of tracks on the release were not that thought through, however, two songs were: "'My Father's Eyes', Clapton's rumination on maturity, hold their own against the wall of sound. While his guitar playing is kept on its usual leash here, he lets loose occasional bursts of staccato blues licks, as on the funky 'She's Gone', which musters up some sass to offset all the heartbreak". Nichols disliked the album's "schmaltzy ballads" the most. Robert Christgau rated Pilgrim with a "C+".

Critic Harry Sumrall from MTV thinks the album "proclaimes" Clapton's "Clapton is God" reputation. Billboard magazine's Paul Verna thinks, nearly all the material on Pilgrim falls short of what Clapton's fans expect. He goes on in his review, stating Pilgrim sounds like a demo recording, however, Verna also likes some of the album's tracks, but calls Pilgrim a release, which does not live up to Clapton's giant legacy. Music journalists from the People magazine think the album occasionally offers "moments of surpassing beauty", but note "at 75 minutes, Pilgrim is one long, slow slog, interrupted by only two or three uptempo tunes. Listening is like sitting through a film you much admire but fervently wish would hurry up and end". Critics from Entertainment Weekly recall: "It's impossible to fault [Clapton] for any ongoing numbness from his loss. But the truly sad thing about Pilgrim – for Clapton and maybe all of us – is that not even music may have the power to heal certain types of pain". The website rated the release with a "B−". The New York Times' critic Stephen Holden notes: "The best songs on this bleakly eloquent album of orchestrated blues meditations express a choked-up grief and despair that slices to the bone. The year's most underrated album. Killer cuts: 'Pilgrim' and 'Inside of Me'".

== Track listing ==
Pilgrim track listing
| No. | Title | Writer(s) | Producer(s) | Length |
|---|---|---|---|---|
| 1. | "My Father's Eyes" (Re-worked Unplugged song) | Eric Clapton | Eric Clapton · Simon Climie | 5:24 |
| 2. | "River of Tears" | Eric Clapton · Simon Climie | Eric Clapton · Simon Climie | 7:22 |
| 3. | "Pilgrim" | Eric Clapton · Simon Climie | Eric Clapton · Simon Climie | 5:50 |
| 4. | "Broken Hearted" | Eric Clapton · Greg Phillinganes | Eric Clapton · Simon Climie | 7:52 |
| 5. | "One Chance" | Eric Clapton · Simon Climie | Eric Clapton · Simon Climie | 5:55 |
| 6. | "Circus" (Re-worked Unplugged song) | Eric Clapton | Eric Clapton · Simon Climie | 4:11 |
| 7. | "Going Down Slow" (St. Louis Jimmy Oden) | St. Louis Jimmy Oden | Eric Clapton · Simon Climie | 5:19 |
| 8. | "Fall Like Rain" | Eric Clapton | Eric Clapton · Simon Climie | 3:50 |
| 9. | "Born in Time" | Bob Dylan | Eric Clapton · Simon Climie | 4:41 |
| 10. | "Sick and Tired" | Eric Clapton · Simon Climie | Eric Clapton · Simon Climie | 5:43 |
| 11. | "Needs His Woman" | Eric Clapton | Eric Clapton · Simon Climie | 3:45 |
| 12. | "She's Gone" | Eric Clapton · Simon Climie | Eric Clapton · Simon Climie | 4:45 |
| 13. | "You Were There" | Eric Clapton | Eric Clapton · Simon Climie | 5:31 |
| 14. | "Inside of Me" | Eric Clapton · Simon Climie | Eric Clapton · Simon Climie | 5:25 |
| Total length: | | | | 75:33 |

Japanese edition bonus track
| No. | Title | Music | Length |
|---|---|---|---|
| 15. | "Theme From A Movie That Never Happened (Orchestral)" | Clapton | 3:30 |

== Personnel ==
Taken from the album's liner notes.

- Eric Clapton – guitars, lead vocals, backing vocals (8)
- Andy Fairweather Low – guitars (1)
- Simon Climie – keyboards (1, 2, 5–10, 12, 14), synthesizer bass (2), backing vocals (2, 3, 13), drum programming (3, 4, 10, 13), keyboard programming (4)
- Joe Sample – acoustic piano (1, 13)
- Chris Stainton – Hammond organ (1, 13)
- Paul Carrack – Hammond organ (3, 5, 7, 10, 12), Wurlitzer electric piano (7)
- Greg Phillinganes – keyboards (4, 11)
- Nathan East – bass guitar (1, 4, 6, 8, 11)
- Luís Jardim – bass guitar (2), percussion (2, 9)
- Pino Palladino – bass guitar (5, 7, 9, 12)
- Dave Bronze – bass guitar (13)
- Paul Waller – drum programming (1, 2, 4–9, 11, 12, 14)
- Steve Gadd – drums (1, 4, 12, 13)
- Paul Brady – tin whistle (4), backing vocals (4)
- Nick Ingman – string arrangements (2, 3, 5, 7, 9, 10, 13, 14)
- The London Session Orchestra – strings (2, 3, 5, 7, 9, 10, 13, 14)
- Chyna Whyne – backing vocals (1–6, 12, 13, 14)
- Kenneth "Babyface" Edmonds – backing vocals (9)
- Tony Rich – backing vocals (11)
- Ruth Kelly-Clapton – spoken verse (14)

== Production ==
- Producers – Eric Clapton and Simon Climie
- Engineer – Alan Douglas
- Assistant Engineer – Adam Brown
- Mixing – Mick Guzauski (Tracks 1, 3, 4, 5, 7, 10 & 11); Alan Douglas (Tracks 2, 6, 8, 9, 12, 13 & 14)
- ProTools Computer – Simon Climie, assisted by Mike Higham.
- Mastered by Bob Ludwig at Gateway Mastering (Portland, ME).
- Guitar Technician – Lee Dickson
- Album Sleeve Concept – Eric Clapton
- Design – Wherefore Art?
- Illustration – Yoshiyuki Sadamoto

== Accolades ==
| Year | Ceremony | Award | Result | Ref. |
|---|---|---|---|---|
| 1998 | Billboard | Fastest-selling Album of 1998 | Won | |
| 1999 | Billboard | Best-selling Albums of 1998 | No. 59 | |
| 1999 | Echo | Best International Rock/Pop Male Artist & Release | Nominated | |
| 1999 | Grammy Awards | Best Pop Vocal Album | Nominated | |
| 1999 | Grammy Awards | Best Pop Vocal Performance Male | Won | |

== Chart positions ==
=== Weekly charts ===
| Chart (1998) | Peak position |
|---|---|
| Australian Albums (ARIA) | 17 |
| Austrian Albums (Ö3 Austria) | 4 |
| Belgian Albums (Ultratop Flanders) | 6 |
| Belgian Albums (Ultratop Wallonia) | 6 |
| Canadian Albums (The Record) | 5 |
| Canadian Albums (RPM) | 5 |
| Danish Albums (Hitlisten) | 6 |
| Dutch Albums (Album Top 100) | 7 |
| European Albums (IFPI) | 4 |
| Finnish Albums (Suomen virallinen lista) | 5 |
| French Albums (SNEP) | 5 |
| German Albums (Offizielle Top 100) | 3 |
| Hungarian Albums (MAHASZ) | 8 |
| Italian Albums (FIMI) | 3 |
| Japanese Albums (Oricon) | 1 |
| New Zealand Albums (RMNZ) | 10 |
| Norwegian Albums (VG-lista) | 1 |
| Portuguese Albums (AFP) | 7 |
| Scottish Albums (OCC) | 12 |
| Spanish Albums (AFYVE) | 7 |
| Swedish Albums (Sverigetopplistan) | 3 |
| Swiss Albums (Schweizer Hitparade) | 4 |
| UK Albums (OCC) | 3 |
| US Billboard 200 | 4 |

=== Year-end charts ===
| Chart (1998) | Position |
|---|---|
| Austrian Albums (Ö3 Austria) | 25 |
| Belgian Albums (Ultratop Flanders) | 100 |
| Belgian Albums (Ultratop Wallonia) | 47 |
| Canadian Albums (RPM) | 46 |
| Danish Albums (Hitlisten) | 35 |
| Dutch Albums (MegaCharts) | 68 |
| European Top 100 Albums (Music & Media) | 20 |
| French Albums (SNEP) | 67 |
| German Albums (Offizielle Top 100) | 14 |
| Japanese Albums (Oricon) | 74 |
| Swedish Albums (Sverigetopplistan) | 48 |
| UK Albums (OCC) | 83 |
| US Billboard 200 | 65 |

== Certifications ==
Sales certifications for Pilgrim
| Region | Certification | Certified units/sales |
|---|---|---|
| Australia (ARIA) | Gold | 35,000^{^} |
| Austria (IFPI Austria) | Gold | 25,000^{*} |
| Belgium (BRMA) | Gold | 25,000^{*} |
| Canada (Music Canada) | 2× Platinum | 200,000^{^} |
| Finland (Musiikkituottajat) | Gold | 21,583 |
| France (SNEP) | Gold | 100,000^{*} |
| Germany (BVMI) | Gold | 250,000^{^} |
| Hong Kong (IFPI Hong Kong) | Platinum | 20,000^{*} |
| Japan (RIAJ) | 2× Platinum | 400,000^{^} |
| New Zealand (RMNZ) | Gold | 7,500^{^} |
| Norway (IFPI Norway) | Platinum | 50,000^{*} |
| Poland (ZPAV) | Gold | 50,000^{*} |
| Spain (Promusicae) | Gold | 50,000^{^} |
| Sweden (GLF) | Gold | 40,000^{^} |
| Switzerland (IFPI Switzerland) | Gold | 25,000^{^} |
| United Kingdom (BPI) | Gold | 100,000^{^} |
| United States (RIAA) | Platinum | 1,000,000^{^} |
Summaries
| Europe (IFPI) | 2× Platinum | 2,000,000^{*} |
^{*} Sales figures based on certification alone.^{^} Shipments figures based on certification alone.
