= Circus Left Town =

"Circus"

Single by Eric Clapton

from the album Pilgrim
- Released: June 1998
- Genre: Pop rock
- Length: 4:06
- Label: Reprise
- Songwriter: Eric Clapton
- Producer: Eric Clapton · Simon Climie

Eric Clapton singles chronology
| "She's Gone" (1998) | "Circus" (1998) | "Born in Time" (1998) |

Audio
- "Circus" (1992 unplugged live) by Eric Clapton on YouTube
- "Circus" (1998 studio version) by Eric Clapton on YouTube

"Circus Left Town", also known as "Circus", is a ballad written by the British recording artist Eric Clapton. The rock musician wrote the song about the last night he spent with his then four-year-old son Conor. Although Clapton played and recorded the song for his 1992 million seller live album Unplugged, he decided to release the title six years later as a re-recording for both his 1998 effort Pilgrim and as a single release. However, Clapton played the song live for his 1992 Eric Clapton World Tour, before it came out on any recording formats.

== Writing ==
Clapton wrote the song in the summer of 1991. When it came time for Clapton to write the lyrics, the British rock musician wanted to put the last experience he had with his young son in the song. In a BBC interview from 1998 Clapton remembered: "The last night I spent with Conor, we went to the circus. We went to see one of those huge things that they do in America where they have three rings going on at the same time. You've got clowns and tigers and everything. They don't do anything in half measures. They just pile it all in. Plus, they're trying to sell you things at the same time. I mean it was an amazing thing. After the show, we were driving back to New York City and all he could remember, all he could talk about was this clown. He'd seen a clown with a knife, which I didn't see at all. Some clown was running around brandishing a knife, which was something quite frightening but he liked it – I mean it excited him. And so that is in the lyrics. But, and I suppose what I was doing, I was remembering, I mean paying tribute to this night with him and also seeing him as being the circus of my life. You know – that particular part of my life has now left town".

== Composition ==
"Circus Left Town"
Eric Clapton's "Circus Left Town" from the 1998 studio album Pilgrim

"Circus Left Town" is written in a pop and rock music vein. It features styles of adult contemporary, adult rock and contemporary pop rock music. Although the whole song is based around an A-major-7-harmony and chords structure, Clapton uses a lot of minor chords to give the song the sad atmosphere and emotion the British composer went through when hearing about his son's death. For the recording, Clapton used a nylon string acoustic guitar he played with the Clawhammer technique, which he prefers to play on acoustic guitar. The song's lyrics consist of three different parts. "Circus" starts out with a four-part verse, followed by the chorus. Afterwards, the second verse is sung by Clapton, leading with a double time repeat of the chorus to the end of the song. In the title, Clapton sings about his son's joyous personality and the fact that this evening at the circus will be his son's last. In the second verse, Clapton describes the happy and joyful heart his son has been given and tells his son Conor, what he would do with him, if he were still alive. The chorus features the pain Clapton felt and Conor's friends, who would all gather one last time, since the circus left the town, New York City. In the song, Clapton expresses what a deep and personal connection the songwriter felt with his son as he uses declamatory descriptions like "eyes on fire".

== Personnel ==
- Eric Clapton – lead vocals and classical guitar
- Simon Climie – keyboards
- Nathan East – bass guitar
- Paul Waller – drum machine
- Chyna Whyne – backing vocals

== Release ==
The song was originally set out to be released with the Unplugged live album in 1992, but was dropped from the album track listing. However, "Circus" and "My Father's Eyes" – another song left out by Clapton for the 1992 release, were re-recorded and released in 1998 on the studio album Pilgrim. In addition the album release, Clapton had the song released as a single in June 1998 for Reprise Records in Europe and the United States. There were several types of singles released, including a promotional single, a maxi compact disc single as well as a limited edition maxi single, released on compact disc format. All of these single releases features different B-, C- and D-sides to them. However, Clapton played the song along with his mega hit single "Tears in Heaven" for his 1992 World Tour during a small acoustic set. Before the reworked version of "Circus Left Town" was officially released in 1998, many Clapton fans recorded the original version and published the song as bootleg recordings in 1992. "Circus" was resurrected for the 6-night shows at the Nippon Budokan in 2016.

== Chart performance ==
Unlike many other singles released of the 1998 Pilgrim album, "Circus" was not so successful in the music charts. In the United Kingdom, the single peaked at number 39 on both the physical singles sales and combined singles sales chart, compiled by the Official Charts Company in June 1998 and as of 2021, remains his last top 40 hit in that country. In the Netherlands, "Circus" placed itself on rank 92 on the Single Top 100, compiled by the official Dutch MegaCharts. In Japan, the single effort reached number 99 on the Oricon Top 100 singles chart, selling 2,750 copies while on chart.

== Critical reception ==
The German music journalist Sabine Feickert of Rocktimes calls the song "ambivalent", noting it forced the listener to apply it automatically to subjective thoughts about what has happened to themself. However, Feickert also recalls the great melancholic and languorous melody, which seems to fit the song's motives perfect. AllMusic critic Stephen Thomas Erlewine thinks that Clapton's singing is "startlingly mannered" and does not suit this "emotionally turbulent number". The reviewers of Ultimate Guitar think, that "Circus" is one of the best tracks of the Pilgrim studio release. Journalist David Wild of Rolling Stone magazine calls the title "ultradelicate" and notes that Clapton's singing on the track seems to be "among the most convincing [singing performances] of his career". Something Else critic Nick DeRiso calls the ballad a "moving rumination on lost love and lost moments".

== Track listing ==
CD Maxi single
| No. | Title | Writer(s) | Length |
|---|---|---|---|
| 1. | "Circus" | Eric Clapton | 4:06 |
| 2. | "Behind the Mask" | Ryuichi Sakamoto | 4:46 |
| 3. | "Bad Love" | Eric Clapton · Mick Jones | 5:12 |
| 4. | "Tearing Us Apart" | Eric Clapton · Greg Phillinganes | 4:14 |
| Total length: | | | 18:18 |

== Chart positions ==
=== Weekly charts ===
| Chart (1998–1999) | Peak position |
|---|---|
| Netherlands (Single Top 100) | 92 |
| Japan (Oricon) | 99 |
| UK Physical Singles (OCC) | 39 |
| UK Singles (OCC) | 39 |

== Release history ==
| Date | Region | Format | Ref. |
|---|---|---|---|
| 1998 | Germany | Compact disc | |
| 1998 | Japan | Compact disc | |
| 1998 | Netherlands | Compact disc | |
| 1998 | South Africa | Compact disc | |
| 1998 | United Kingdom | Compact disc | |
| 1998 | United States | Compact disc | |
