= Phenomenon (soundtrack) =

Soundtrack album by various artists
- Released: June 1996
- Genre: Pop
- Length: 44:50
- Label: Reprise
- Producer: Robbie Robertson

The Phenomenon soundtrack is a compilation album by various artists released for Reprise Records, who contributed to the music score of the 1996 American romantic fantasy drama film Phenomenon, starring John Travolta. The soundtrack features performances by international music stars including Eric Clapton, Bryan Ferry and Peter Gabriel, and went on to be a high-selling soundtrack release. The single "Change the World", performed by Eric Clapton, which was released off the album became a global hit and helped to promote the soundtrack's sales figures. "Everyday Is A Winding Road", from Sheryl Crow's 1996 self-titled album, was featured in the film, but not on the soundtrack.

== Reception ==
The soundtrack album topped the Billboard 200 album chart and sold more than 1.5 million copies while on chart, gaining a Platinum disc from the Recording Industry Association of America. Critics from the MovieTunes website called the release "more than simply an aural souvenir of a magical movie experience. It is the cutting edge of a collaborative art-form whose time has come". In his review for the music website AllMusic, journalist and critic Stephen Thomas Erlewine notes:

Designed for adult contemporary listeners, the soundtrack to the John Travolta movie Phenomenon has a cross-section of singer/songwriters, mellow blues, and synthesized soul-inflected pop. Out of all the contributors – which include such heavy hitters as Peter Gabriel, Bryan Ferry, John Hiatt, J.J. Cale, Taj Mahal, and a duet between Aaron Neville and Robbie Robertson – the standout track is "Change the World", a song Babyface wrote and produced for Eric Clapton. The two musicians work surprisingly well together, creating a laid-back, soulful number that is quietly seductive. Nothing on the album works quite as well, but it is a pleasant listen, if not a particularly memorable one.

— Stephen Thomas Erlewine, AllMusic

== Track listing ==
Phenomenon track listing
| No. | Title | Writer(s) | Performer(s) | Length |
|---|---|---|---|---|
| 1. | "Change the World" | Gordon Kennedy · Wayne Kirkpatrick · Tommy Sims | Eric Clapton | 3:56 |
| 2. | "Dance with Life (The Brilliant Light)" | Bernie Taupin · Martin Page | Bryan Ferry | 6:14 |
| 3. | "Crazy Love" | Van Morrison | Aaron Neville · Robbie Robertson | 4:30 |
| 4. | "Corrina" | Jesse Ed Davis · Taj Mahal | Taj Mahal | 3:00 |
| 5. | "Have a Little Faith in Me" | John Hiatt | Jewel | 4:24 |
| 6. | "I Have the Touch" | Peter Gabriel | Peter Gabriel | 5:27 |
| 7. | "Piece of Clay" | Gloria Jones · Pam Sawyer | Marvin Gaye | 5:11 |
| 8. | "Para Donde Vas" | Joe Cabral · Rod Hodges | The Iguanas | 3:18 |
| 9. | "Misty Blue" | Bobby Montgomery | Dorothy Moore | 3:39 |
| 10. | "A Thing Goes On" | J.J. Cale | J.J. Cale | 2:38 |
| 11. | "The Orchard" | Thomas Newman | Thomas Newman | 2:33 |
| Total length: | | | | 44:50 |

== Certifications ==
| Region | Certification | Certified units/sales |
|---|---|---|
| Canada (Music Canada) | Platinum | 100,000^{^} |
| United States (RIAA) | Platinum | 1,000,000^{^} |
^{^} Shipments figures based on certification alone.
