= Forever Man =

1985 single by Eric Clapton

Single by Eric Clapton

from the album Behind the Sun
- B-side: "Too Bad"
- Released: 22 February 1985
- Recorded: 1984
- Genre: Rock
- Length: 3:10
- Label: Warner Bros.
- Songwriter: Jerry Lynn Williams
- Producers: Lenny Waronker & Ted Templeman

Eric Clapton singles chronology
"I've Got a Rock 'n' Roll Heart" (1983)	"Forever Man" (1985)	"See What Love Can Do" (1985)

Music video
- "Forever Man" on YouTube

"Forever Man" is a song from Eric Clapton's 1985 album Behind the Sun, released as the first single of the album. It reached number one on the Billboard Top Rock Tracks chart, becoming his second single to do so. In total, the single release sold more than 500,000 copies worldwide.

== Composition ==
Clapton had just signed a contract with Warner Bros. Records when he started recording Behind the Sun. When the album was completed, the record company rejected it because they felt it did not have enough singles. They commissioned three songs by composer Jerry Lynn Williams, one of which was "Forever Man". The song begins with a riff in which a bass, guitar and synth play. The song has an intro, verse, chorus, verse solo and final chorus structure and is in the key of D minor.

== Music video and appearance ==
The song produced Clapton's first music video, showing Clapton performing the song with his tour band Donald "Duck" Dunn, Jamie Oldaker, Michael Omartian, Tim Renwick, Shaun Murphy, and Marcella Detroit on a circular stage that had a raised step in the center where Clapton performs, the other members of the band being a step below. At about 2:45 into the video, a camera rig falls over, which was not intentional, but was left in the video. The video was directed by Godley and Creme.

"Forever Man" was featured on the Eric Clapton, Steve Winwood double CD and DVD Live From Madison Square Garden and many other compilation albums including The Cream of Eric Clapton (1987), Complete Clapton (2007) and Forever Man (2015). The original music video was released, as the sound recording, on the VHS, CD, download and DVD compilation Clapton Chronicles: The Best of Eric Clapton in 1999.

== Reception ==
Cash Box described "Forever Man" as a "gutsy soul inspired work-out" with "one of Clapton’s most piercing leads in memory" and said it was "definitely Clapton’s strongest work in years." Billboard described it as a "a reprise of his venerable blues-boogie style" The Age critic Mike Daly described it as a "muscular rocker with a hot solo guitar and a full vocal chorus." Commercial Appeal critic Brown Burnett called it "the best single Clapton's had in years."

== Commercial performance ==
In the United Kingdom, the single release entered the official music charts, compiled by the Official Charts Company at number 77 and peaked at position 51 the next week. In total, the "Forever Man" spent six weeks on the British single charts. While on chart in the United Kingdom, the single sold a total of 19,934 copies in six weeks. In the United States, "Forever Man" ranked at number 26 on Billboard magazine's Hot 100 singles chart and spent a total of twelve weeks on chart. In North America, it also became second number hit on the Mainstream Rock airplay chart. While charting on the single sales compilation, the single release sold a total of 193,932 records in the United States alone. In Canada, the single did not reach the RPM sales chart, but sold 3,382 copies in the country. In Australia, the single peaked at number 92, as the Kent Music Report published in 1993. "Forever Man" did also reached various national single charts in Belgium and the Netherlands. In Denmark and Japan, the single was certified with a gold disc to commemorate outstanding sales figures of the 1985 release. In total, the single sold more than 500,000 copies worldwide.

== Charts and certifications ==
=== Weekly charts ===
Chart (1985)	Peak position
Australia (Kent Music Report)	92
Belgium (Ultratop 50 Flanders)	22
Belgium (VRT Top 30 Flanders)	18
Japan (Oricon International)	23
Netherlands (Dutch Top 40)	15
Netherlands (Single Top 100)	15
UK Singles (Official Charts)	51
US Billboard Hot 100	26
US Mainstream Rock (Billboard)	1

=== Year-end charts ===
Chart (1985)	Position
Netherlands (Dutch Top 40)	99

=== Certifications ===
Region	Certification	Certified units/sales
Japan (RIAJ)	Gold	50,000^{^}
^{^} Shipments figures based on certification alone.

== Beatchuggers version ==
"Forever Man (How Many Times)"

Single by Beatchuggers
- Released: October 23, 2000
- Recorded: October 2000
- Genre: Electronic · House
- Length: 3:48
- Label: Flex
- Songwriter: Jerry Lynn Williams
- Producer: Michael Linde

In 2000, the then 23-year-old Danish House producer Michael Linde – also known as Beatchuggers – "fooled around" with a sample of Clapton's original "Forever Man" recording, and decided to do a demo recording of the song in his style. The track, originally titled "How Many Times", was produced as a white label release by the indie Bim Bam Recordings. The disc was sent to London, where Clapton listened to the Beatchuggers version and became interested in the project. Back in Denmark, EMI–Medley's dance subsidiary, Flex, signed Michael Linde and was then set to release the recording as "Forever Man (How Many Times)" under the act name "Beatchuggers Featuring Eric Clapton". EMI–Medley director of international exploitation Ole Mortensen said that the record will be released in late October 2000 and that Clapton will be featured in the promotional music video.

The more dance-oriented version was released on October 23, 2000 as a digital download, as a CD maxi single and on 12 inch gramophone record with different B-sides of the same songs consisting of other mixes and lengths. The single is accompanied by a music video. Besides of Jacob Horney who played additional keyboards along with Nils Munk who played bass guitar on top of the original recording are no other musicians involved with the recording. Alan Mawdfley engineered the recording while the artists Fletch, Jan Eliasson and Lene Reidel remixed the B-sides for the single release. The cover artwork was created by Peter Stenbæk. Reviews from the Schweizer Hitparade had been positive, where as AllMusic did not rate the single.

=== Weekly charts ===
Chart (2000–01)	Peak position
Australia (ARIA Club Chart)	10
Belgium (Ultratip 20 Flanders)	14
Denmark (Tracklisten)	5
UK Singles (Official Charts)	26
