= My Father's Eyes (song) =

1998 single by Eric Clapton

Single by Eric Clapton

from the album Pilgrim
- B-side: "Theme from a Movie That Never Happened"; "Inside of Me"
- Released: 10 March 1998
- Length: 5:24
- Label: Reprise; Duck
- Songwriter: Eric Clapton
- Producers: Eric Clapton, Simon Climie

Eric Clapton singles chronology
"Change the World" (1996)	"My Father's Eyes" (1998)	"Circus" (1998)

"My Father's Eyes" is a song written and performed by British musician Eric Clapton, and produced by Clapton and Simon Climie. It was released as a single in March 1998 and was included on Clapton's 13th solo studio album, Pilgrim (1998). The song entered the top 40 on the US Billboard Hot 100 Airplay chart, peaking at number 16, and spent seven weeks at number one on the Billboard Triple-A chart. It became a top-five hit in Canada, where it peaked at number two, and reached the top 20 in Austria, Iceland, and Norway. In 1999, it won a Grammy Award for Best Male Pop Vocal Performance.

Clapton performed this track for the first time in 1992 and again in 1996, in both electric and unplugged versions. These versions of the song were completely different from the official single release in 1998. He would later retire the song in 2004, along with "Tears in Heaven", until the 50 Years Further On Up the Road world tour in 2013.

== Inspiration and content ==
Clapton wrote "My Father's Eyes" whilst living in Antigua and Barbuda in 1991. The song was inspired by the fact that Clapton never met his father, Edward Fryer, who died of leukemia in 1985. Describing how he wishes he knew his father, the song also refers to his own son Conor, who died in 1991 at age four after falling from an apartment window. In Eric Clapton: The Autobiography (2010), Clapton wrote: "In [the song] I tried to describe the parallel between looking in the eyes of my son, and the eyes of the father that I never met, through the chain of our blood."

== Critical reception ==
British magazine Music Week named "My Father's Eyes" one of the album's "most satisfying moments" and "most radio-friendly offerings", "with Clapton's usual restrained vocalising given a strong lift on the memorable chorus by the more optimistically-sounding backing singers. This is unlikely to hang around the chart for long, but will serve its main purpose of lifting album sales."

== Accolades ==
Year	Ceremony	Award	Result	Ref.
1999	BMI Awards	Song of the Year	Won	
1999	Grammy Awards	Best Pop Vocal Performance Male	Won	

== Track listing ==
1. "My Father's Eyes"
2. "Change the World"
3. "Theme from a Movie That Never Happened" (orchestral)
4. "Inside of Me"

== Charts ==
=== Weekly charts ===
Chart (1998)	Peak position
Australia (ARIA)	74
Austria (Ö3 Austria Top 40)	18
Canada Top Singles (RPM)	2
Canada Adult Contemporary (RPM)	1
Germany (GfK)	57
Iceland (Íslenski Listinn Topp 40)	12
Netherlands (Dutch Top 40 Tipparade)	20
Netherlands (Single Top 100)	72
Norway (VG-lista)	20
Scottish Singles Sales (Official Charts)	41
Switzerland (Schweizer Hitparade)	31
UK Singles (Official Charts)	33
US Radio Songs (Billboard)	16
US Adult Alternative Airplay (Billboard)	1
US Adult Contemporary (Billboard)	2
US Adult Pop Airplay (Billboard)	7
US Mainstream Rock (Billboard)	26
US Pop Airplay (Billboard)	21

=== Year-end charts ===
Chart (1998)	Position
Canada Top Singles (RPM)	42
Canada Adult Contemporary (RPM)	5
US Adult Contemporary (Billboard)	4
US Adult Top 40 (Billboard)	28
US Mainstream Top 40 (Billboard)	80
US Triple-A (Billboard)	22

== Release history ==
Region	Date	Format(s)	Label(s)	Ref.
United States	10 February 1998	Contemporary hit radio	Reprise	
Japan	10 March 1998	CD	Reprise; Duck	
United Kingdom	23 March 1998	CD	Reprise; Duck	
