= Rush (1991 soundtrack) =

Soundtrack album by Eric Clapton
- Released: 14 January 1992
- Genres: Blues, pop rock, soft rock
- Length: 41:40
- Label: Duck / Reprise
- Producer: Russ Titelman

Eric Clapton chronology
| 24 Nights (1991) | Rush (1992) | Unplugged (1992) |

Singles from Rush (soundtrack)
- 1. "Tears in Heaven" Released: 27 January 1992

Rush is the soundtrack album for the 1991 film of the same name. Written and performed by Eric Clapton, the soundtrack album includes the song "Tears in Heaven," (originally released on 18 December 1991 before a larger release in January 1992) which won three Grammy Awards in 1993.

In a review of the album, AllMusic Guide wrote: "This album has far more impact than you might expect from the score to a movie — there's a sense of the music here working something out in Clapton's heart, a sense given a lot of power thanks to the intense, heart-rending passion invoked by some of the turns taken here. At its best, Clapton's music can speak of the pain he feels — and Clapton has rarely been better than he is here."

== Track listing ==
All songs written by Eric Clapton, except where noted:

| No. | Title | Writer(s) | Length |
|---|---|---|---|
| 1. | "New Recruit" | | 1:28 |
| 2. | "Tracks And Lines" | | 3:01 |
| 3. | "Realization" | | 2:41 |
| 4. | "Kristen And Jim" | | 3:40 |
| 5. | "Preludin Fugue" | | 3:20 |
| 6. | "Cold Turkey" | | 2:24 |
| 7. | "Will Gaines" | | 3:50 |
| 8. | "Help Me Up" | Clapton, Will Jennings | 5:53 |
| 9. | "Don't Know Which Way To Go" | Willie Dixon, Al Perkins | 10:48 |
| 10. | "Tears in Heaven" | Clapton, Jennings | 4:32 |

== Personnel ==
=== Musicians – Score ===
- Eric Clapton – guitar
- Randy Kerber – keyboards
- Greg Phillinganes – keyboards
- Chuck Leavell – piano and organ
- Robbie Kondor – synthesizer
- Nathan East – bass
- Tim Drummond – bass
- Steve Ferrone – drums
- Lenny Castro – percussion
- Bruce Dukov – concertmaster

=== Musicians – Songs ===
"Help Me Up"

- Eric Clapton – vocals, guitar
- Randy Kerber – organ
- Greg Phillinganes – piano
- Nathan East – bass
- Steve Ferrone – drums
- Lenny Castro – percussion
- Bill Champlin, Vaneese Thomas, Jenni Muldaur, Lani Groves – background vocals
- Synth horns arranged and performed by David Frank

"Don't Know Which Way to Go"

- Buddy Guy – vocals, guitar
- Eric Clapton – guitar
- Chuck Leavell – piano
- Greg Phillinganes – organ
- Nathan East – bass
- Steve Ferrone – drums

"Tears in Heaven"

- Eric Clapton – vocals, guitar, Dobro
- Randy Kerber – synthesizer
- JayDee Maness – pedal steel
- Nathan East – bass
- Gayle Levant – Celtic harp
- Lenny Castro – percussion
- Jimmy Bralower – drum machine

== Chart performance ==
| Chart (1992) | Peak position |
|---|---|
| Canada Top Albums/CDs (RPM) | 13 |
| Dutch Albums (Album Top 100) | 51 |
| New Zealand Albums (RMNZ) | 19 |
| US Billboard 200 | 24 |

== Certifications ==
| Region | Certification | Certified units/sales |
|---|---|---|
| Canada (Music Canada) | Gold | 50,000^{^} |
| United States (RIAA) | Gold | 500,000^{^} |
^{^} Shipments figures based on certification alone.
