= Unplugged (Eric Clapton album) =

Live album by Eric Clapton
- Released: 25 August 1992
- Recorded: 16 January 1992
- Venues: Bray Studios (Windsor, England)
- Genres: Acoustic rock; folk rock; blues rock
- Length: 61:47
- Labels: Reprise; Duck; MTV
- Producer: Russ Titelman

Eric Clapton chronology
Rush (1991)	Unplugged (1992)	Derek and the Dominos Live at the Fillmore (1994)

Singles from Unplugged
- 1. "Layla" Released: 21 September 1992

Unplugged is a 1992 live album by the English guitarist Eric Clapton, recorded at Bray Studios in Windsor, England, in front of an audience for the MTV Unplugged TV series. It includes performances of the songs "Tears in Heaven" (1992) and "Layla" (1970). The album won three Grammy Awards at the 35th Annual Grammy Awards in 1993. It became the best-selling live album of all time, and Clapton's best-selling album, selling 26 million copies worldwide.

== Recording ==
Clapton performed the show in front of a small audience on 16 January 1992 at Bray Film Studios in Windsor, England. In addition to the final album tracks, the performance included early versions of "My Father's Eyes" and "Circus Left Town" along with "Worried Life Blues" and a version of "Rollin' and Tumblin'".

Shortly after telling the studio audience "that's it," Clapton said they needed to do "two – no, three - no, five" songs over again, adding "if you don't mind, I don't mind." After the second take of "My Father's Eyes" there was a brief break and cameras were off. He broke into an impromptu "Rollin' and Tumblin'", which he had last performed with Cream. The seasoned musicians quickly picked up on it and the crowd clapped along. The director signaled the crew to record, which is why there is such an abrupt start to the song mid-verse. Clapton was so pleased with it that when the song ended, he asked the director, "did you get that?"

For much of the performance, Clapton played Martin 000-42 acoustic guitars. In 2004, one of the guitars sold for $791,500 (£434,400) at auction.

== Critical reception ==
Professional ratings
Review scores
Source	Rating
AllMusic	4.5/5 stars
The Penguin Guide to Blues Recordings	3/4 stars

The album was released on 25 August 1992 in the US and 31 August in the UK to some of the best reviews of his career. The album renewed the public's interest in Clapton, and boosted his popularity. Critical reception has been mixed though muted; in general, reviewers report that the album, if unremarkable, is "relaxed" and "pleasant". Stephen Thomas Erlewine for AllMusic feels that people have misrepresented and mythologised the album; that though it came after Paul McCartney's MTV Unplugged album, Unplugged (The Official Bootleg) (1991), people often mistake it for "the first-ever MTV album", that they often feel that "it alone was responsible for revitalizing Clapton's career", and that "Tears in Heaven" was first recorded here. Erlewine feels that the songs are "lively and relaxed", that Clapton turns "Layla" from an "anguished howl of pain into a cozy shuffle and the whole album proceeds at a similar amiable gait" while "Clapton is embracing his middle age". Robert Christgau was sharper in his comments, feeling that in an effort to be inoffensive "Clapton-the-electric-guitarist" has been relegated "to the mists of memory", and that "Layla" was turned into a "whispery greeting card".

Greg Kot of the Chicago Tribune calls the release a "blues album for yuppies" and rates it with 2.5 of 4 stars, saying it is between fair and good. Entertainment Weekly journalist Steve Simels scores the album an A− calling the album "a charmer, a collection of blues standards and recent Clapton songs rendered with just the right combination of intensity (a deeply felt version of "Tears in Heaven") and giddy fun (Clapton actually plays kazoo on "San Francisco Bay Blues")". Steve Hochman in the Los Angeles Times felt that "Tears in Heaven" was "maudlin but moving", "Layla" was "low-key but seductive", but the blues numbers performed in an intimate setting makes the album "Clapton's most passionate collection in years". Commenting on the popularity of the album in his 2007 autobiography, Clapton wishes the reader to understand the great emotional toll he experienced around that time, and suggests that they visit the grave of his son Conor in Ripley to do so. It was voted number 788 in the third edition of Colin Larkin's All Time Top 1000 Albums (2000).

== Accolades ==
Clapton was nominated for nine Grammy Awards at the 35th Annual Grammy Awards in 1993 and won six, including Record of the Year, Album of the Year, Song of the Year, Best Pop Vocal Performance – Male, Best Rock Vocal Performance – Male, and Best Rock Song. Although "Tears in Heaven" also earned three Grammy Awards, it was the version from Rush that the judges awarded.

Year	Organisation	Award	Work	Result	Ref.
1992	Guitar World	Best guitar-albums of 1992	Unplugged	#9	
1992	Musikexpress	Best albums of 1992	Unplugged	#8	
1993	NARAS	Grammy Award for Best Male Rock Vocal Performance	Unplugged	Won	
1993	NARAS	Grammy Award for Album of the Year	Unplugged	Won	
1993	NARAS	Grammy Award for Best Rock Song	Layla	Won	
1993	NCTA	CableACE Award	Unplugged	Nominated	
2000	Q	Best British albums	Unplugged	#71	
2005	Musikexpress	Best albums of the 1990s	Unplugged	#32	

== Personnel ==
- Eric Clapton – lead vocals, acoustic guitar, dobro, kazoo
- Andy Fairweather Low – acoustic guitar, mandolin, harmonica
- Chuck Leavell – acoustic piano, harmonium
- Nathan East – acoustic bass, backing vocals, kazoo
- Steve Ferrone – drums, percussion
- Ray Cooper – percussion
- Katie Kissoon – backing vocals. kazoo
- Tessa Niles – backing vocals, kazoo

=== Production ===
Studio credits

- Russ Titelman – producer
- James "Jimbo" Barton – recording engineer
- Steve Boyer – mixing at The Power Station (New York, NY).
- Victor Deygilo – mix assistant
- Ted Jensen – mastering at Sterling Sound (New York, NY).
- Bill Smith Studio – sleeve design

Live credits

- Milton Lage – film director
- Alex Coletti – producer for MTV.
- Joel Gallen – executive producer for MTV.
- Mick Double – production manager, stage manager
- Tom Kenny – lighting operator
- Wil Roberts – head electrician engineer
- Buford Jones – sound engineer
- John Roden – monitor engineer
- Doug Hall – sound technician
- Lee Dickson – guitar technician for Eric Clapton.
- Tom Calcaterra – guitar technician
- Alan Rogan – guitar technician
- Tim Myer – keyboard technician
- John Collins – drum technician

== Commercial performance ==
In Germany the album peaked at No. 3 in the German Albums Chart and sold a total of 1.25 million copies, becoming one of the best-selling albums in Germany. In Austria, Unplugged held itself 46 weeks in the Austrian Albums Chart and sold more than 100,000 copies in total. In Switzerland the album also reached No. 3 in the country's chart. Selling 60,000 copies in the first two weeks, the live album was certified silver by the British Phonographic Industry – a record for any British artist. In the U.S. the album peaked at No. 1.

== Re-release ==
On 15 October 2013 the album and concert DVD were re-released, titled Unplugged: Expanded & Remastered. The album includes the original 14 tracks, remastered, as well as a bonus disc with six additional tracks, including two versions of "My Father's Eyes". The DVD includes a restored version of the concert, as well as over 60 minutes of unseen footage from the rehearsal.

== Track listing ==
No.	Title	Writer(s)	Length
1.	"Signe"	Eric Clapton	3:13
2.	"Before You Accuse Me"	Ellas McDaniel	3:44
3.	"Hey Hey"	Big Bill Broonzy	3:16
4.	"Tears in Heaven"	Clapton; Will Jennings	4:36
5.	"Lonely Stranger"	Clapton	5:27
6.	"Nobody Knows You When You're Down and Out"	Jimmy Cox	3:49
7.	"Layla"	Clapton; Jim Gordon	4:46
8.	"Running on Faith"	Jerry Lynn Williams	6:30
9.	"Walkin' Blues"	Son House	3:37
10.	"Alberta"	Traditional; Huddie William Ledbetter^{[a]}	3:42
11.	"San Francisco Bay Blues"	Jesse Fuller	3:24
12.	"Malted Milk"	Robert Johnson	3:36
13.	"Old Love"	Clapton; Robert Cray	7:54
14.	"Rollin' and Tumblin'"	Muddy Waters	4:11
Total length:			61:47

Unplugged: Expanded & Remastered (Disc two)
No.	Title	Writer(s)	Length
1.	"Circus"	Eric Clapton	4:28
2.	"My Father's Eyes" (take one)	Clapton	6:22
3.	"Running on Faith" (take one)	Jerry Lynn Williams	6:31
4.	"Walkin' Blues" (take one)	Son House	3:49
5.	"My Father's Eyes" (take two)	Clapton	6:43
6.	"Worried Life Blues"	Maceo Merriweather	5:32
Total length:			33:25

Video edition
No.	Title	Length
1.	"Intro"
2.	"Signe"
3.	"Before You Accuse Me"
4.	"Hey Hey"
5.	"Tears in Heaven"
6.	"Lonely Stranger"
7.	"Nobody Knows You When You're Down and Out"
8.	"Layla"
9.	"Running on Faith"
10.	"Walkin' Blues"
11.	"Alberta"
12.	"San Francisco Bay Blues"
13.	"Malted Milk"
14.	"Old Love"
15.	"Rollin' & Tumblin'"
16.	"Unplugged Rehearsal"

Notes:

- ^{^a}signifies arranged by

== Single releases ==
The acoustic rework of "Layla" was released as the single "Layla (Acoustic)", sometimes titled as "Layla (Unplugged)" in September 1992. The release reached top positions in both 1992 and 1993, reaching No. 1 in the RPM Canadian Top Singles chart as well as peaking at No. 4 in the Canadian Adult Contemporary Tracks the same year. It also became popular in the US reaching No. 4 on the Billboard Pop Singles chart, peaking at No. 9 in the Mainstream Rock chart and reaching place 12 on the Billboard Hot 100. It also reached the top ten five of other countries.

"Running on Faith" was not released as a single, but reached No. 15 on the Billboard Mainstream rock chart in 1993 as well as No. 28 on the Adult Contemporary chart which are based on radio airplay. "Tears in Heaven" was not released as a single from Unplugged, but from the soundtrack for the film Rush.

== Chart positions ==
=== Weekly charts ===
Weekly chart performance for Unplugged
Chart (1992–2015)	Peak position
Australian Albums (ARIA)	1
Australian Music DVD (ARIA)	12
Austrian Albums (Ö3 Austria)	3
Belgian Albums (Ultratop Flanders)	107
Belgian Albums (Ultratop Wallonia)	42
Canadian Albums (RPM)	1
Canadian Albums (The Record)	1
Croatian International Albums (HDU)	31
Danish Albums (Hitlisten)	1
Danish Music DVD (Hitlisten)	1
Dutch Albums (Album Top 100)	1
European Albums (European Top 100 Albums)	2
French Albums (SNEP)	8
Finnish Albums (IFPI)	2
German Albums (Offizielle Top 100)	3
Hungarian Albums (MAHASZ)	17
Hungarian Music DVD (MAHASZ)	9
Japanese Albums (Oricon)	1
New Zealand Albums (RMNZ)	1
Norwegian Albums (VG-lista)	6
Portuguese Albums (AFP)	2
Scottish Albums (Official Charts)	92
Spanish Albums (AFYVE)	2
Swedish Albums (Sverigetopplistan)	3
Swiss Albums (Schweizer Hitparade)	3
UK Albums (Official Charts)	2
US Billboard 200	1
US Top Catalog Albums (Billboard)	3
US Top Video Sales (Billboard)	2

=== Year-end charts ===
1992 year-end chart performance for Unplugged
Chart (1992)	Position
Australian Albums (ARIA)	45
Austrian Albums (Ö3 Austria)	25
Canada Top Albums/CDs (RPM)	7
European Albums (European Top 100 Albums)	25
German Albums (Offizielle Top 100)	40
New Zealand Albums (RMNZ)	4
Swiss Albums (Schweizer Hitparade)	25
UK Albums (OCC)	57
US Billboard 200	36

1993 year-end chart performance for Unplugged
Chart (1993)	Position
Australian Albums (ARIA)	2
Austrian Albums (Ö3 Austria)	7
Canada Top Albums/CDs (RPM)	1
Dutch Albums (MegaCharts)	2
European Albums (European Top 100 Albums)	2
German Albums (Offizielle Top 100)	4
New Zealand Albums (RMNZ)	1
Spanish Albums (AFYVE)	7
Swiss Albums (Schweizer Hitparade)	7
UK Albums (OCC)	16
US Billboard 200	3

1994 year-end chart performance for Unplugged
Chart (1994)	Position
Dutch Albums (MegaCharts)	47

== Certifications ==
=== Album ===
Sales and certifications for the album release of Unplugged
Region	Certification	Certified units/sales
Argentina (CAPIF)	4× Platinum	240,000^{^}
Australia (ARIA)	8× Platinum	560,000^{^}
Austria (IFPI Austria)	2× Platinum	100,000^{*}
Belgium (BRMA)	2× Platinum	100,000^{*}
Brazil (Pro-Música Brasil)	Platinum	700,000
Canada (Music Canada)	Diamond	1,000,000^{^}
Chile (IFPI Chile)	Gold	15,000
Denmark (IFPI Danmark)	3× Platinum	60,000^{‡}
Finland (Musiikkituottajat)	Gold	45,034
France (SNEP)	2× Platinum	600,000^{*}
Germany (BVMI)	5× Gold	1,250,000^{^}
Italy (FIMI)	2× Platinum	200,000^{*}
Italy (FIMI) sales since 2009	Gold	25,000^{‡}
Japan (RIAJ)	Million	1,000,000^{^}
Mexico (AMPROFON)	Platinum	250,000^{^}
Netherlands (NVPI)	4× Platinum	400,000^{^}
New Zealand (RMNZ)	12× Platinum	180,000^{^}
Poland (ZPAV)	Gold	50,000^{*}
Singapore (SPVA)	5× Platinum	80,000
South Korea	—	200,000
Spain (Promusicae)	4× Platinum	400,000^{^}
Sweden (GLF)	Platinum	100,000^{^}
Switzerland (IFPI Switzerland)	2× Platinum	100,000^{^}
United Kingdom (BPI)	4× Platinum	1,200,000^{^}
United States (RIAA)	Diamond	10,000,000^{^}
Summaries
Europe (IFPI)	3× Platinum	3,000,000^{*}
Worldwide	—	26,000,000
^{*} Sales figures based on certification alone.^{^} Shipments figures based on certification alone.^{‡} Sales+streaming figures based on certification alone.

=== VHS and DVD ===
Sales and certifications for the video release of Unplugged
Region	Certification	Certified units/sales
Brazil (Pro-Música Brasil)	Gold	25,000^{*}
France (SNEP)	Platinum	20,000^{*}
New Zealand (RMNZ)	2× Platinum	10,000^{^}
United Kingdom (BPI)	Gold	25,000^{^}
United States (RIAA)	Platinum	100,000^{^}
^{*} Sales figures based on certification alone.^{^} Shipments figures based on certification alone.

== See also ==
- List of best-selling albums
- List of best-selling albums in Argentina
- List of best-selling albums in Brazil
- List of best-selling albums in Germany
- List of best-selling albums in Ireland
- List of best-selling albums in New Zealand
- List of best-selling albums in the United States
