= Tears in Heaven =

1992 single by Eric Clapton

Single by Eric Clapton

from the album Rush: Music from the Motion Picture Soundtrack
- B-side: "Tracks and Lines"
- Released: 18 December 1991
- Recorded: 1991
- Genre: Soft rock
- Length: 4:36
- Label: Warner Bros.
- Songwriters: Eric Clapton; Will Jennings
- Producer: Russ Titelman

Eric Clapton singles chronology
"Wonderful Tonight" (live) (1991)	"Tears in Heaven" (1991)	"It's Probably Me" (1992)

Music video
- "Tears in Heaven" on YouTube

"Tears in Heaven" is a song by the English guitarist, singer, and songwriter Eric Clapton and the American songwriter Will Jennings, released on the soundtrack for the film Rush (1991). It was written about the death of Clapton's four-year-old son Conor.

In January 1992, Clapton performed the song in front of an audience at Bray Studios, Berkshire, England for MTV Unplugged, with the recording appearing on his Unplugged album.

Released by Warner Bros. Records, the song is Clapton's best-selling single in the United States, reaching number one on the Cash Box Top 100 and number two on the Billboard Hot 100. It reached number five on the UK Singles Chart, and also charted in the top 10 in more than 20 countries. It won three Grammy Awards for Best Male Pop Vocal Performance, Song of the Year, and Record of the Year. In 2004, Rolling Stone ranked "Tears in Heaven" 353rd on its list of "The 500 Greatest Songs of All Time".

== Writing ==
On 20 March 1991, Clapton's four-year-old son, Conor, whom he had with Lory Del Santo, died after falling from the 53rd-floor window of a New York City apartment belonging to a friend of Conor’s mother. After isolating himself for a period, Clapton began working again, writing music for the film Rush (1991). He dealt with his grief by writing "Tears in Heaven" with Will Jennings for the soundtrack. Clapton said he admired Jennings' work with Steve Winwood.

According to Jennings, Clapton wrote the lyrics for the first verse, and asked him to write the rest. Jennings urged Clapton to write the entire song due to the personal subject matter, but eventually agreed. He said it was "a song so personal and so sad that it is unique in my experience of writing songs".

In an interview in 1992, Clapton said the song "was in the back of my head but it didn't really have a reason for being until I was scoring this movie ... And it is a little ambiguous because it could be taken to be about Conor but it also is meant to be part of the film." In another interview, he said: "I almost subconsciously used music for myself as a healing agent, and lo and behold, it worked... I have got a great deal of happiness and a great deal of healing from music."

== Release ==
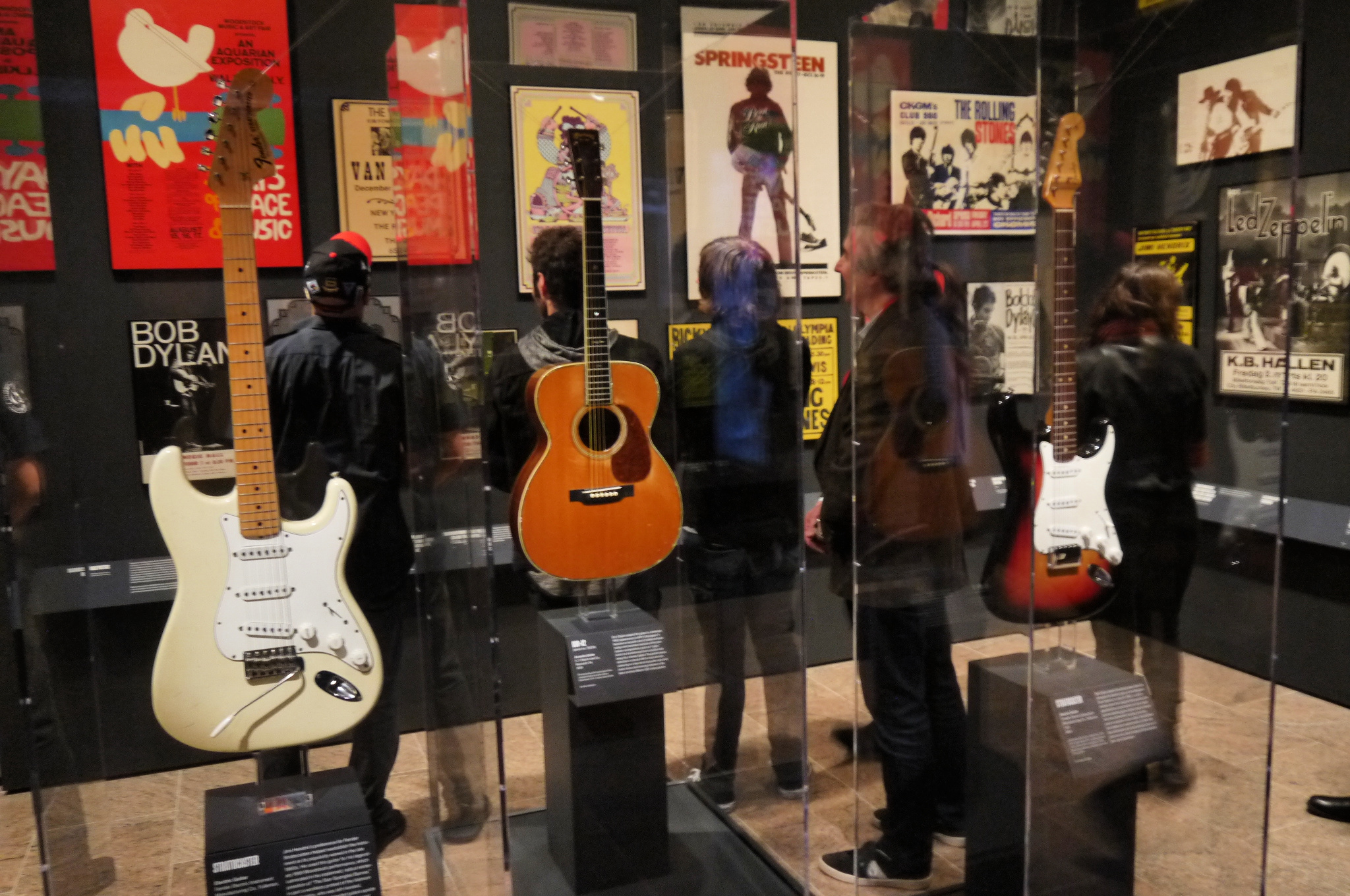
Clapton's C. F. Martin acoustic that he used to play "Tears in Heaven" live at Bray Studios on MTV Unplugged

Shortly after the soundtrack was released, Clapton recorded the song in front of an audience at Bray Studios, Berkshire, England as part of a set for MTV Unplugged, released as Unplugged. The album topped numerous charts, including the US, Japan and Australia, reached number two in the UK, and was nominated for nine Grammy Awards the year it was released.

=== United States and Canada ===
"Tears in Heaven" is Clapton's best-selling single in the United States. With more than 2,800,000 copies sold – both physical and digital – it remains one of the best-selling pop singles of the 1990s and one of the best-selling singles released by any non-American artist. The Reprise Records single reached number two on the Billboard Hot 100 singles charts, where it was held off the number one spot by Vanessa Williams' single "Save the Best for Last" for four weeks and charted for a total of 26 weeks. It is Clapton's highest-charting single on the Hot 100 after "I Shot the Sheriff", which is Clapton's only Hot 100 number one single to date. While charting on America's most important single chart, Clapton received several sales awards by the Billboard magazine, including a "Hot Shot Debut" and a "Power Pick/Sales" certificate. After the physical single release was certified with a Gold disc by the Recording Industry Association of America (RIAA) on 18 March 1992, the single was still selling about 150,000 copies every week.

On 15 April 1992, "Tears in Heaven" was certified with a Platinum certification award for sales of more than 1,000,000 copies in the United States. It topped the Top Single Sales chart, compiled by the Billboard magazine in 1992. The release also topped Billboard magazines Adult Contemporary chart, on which "Tears in Heaven" charted for a total of 30 weeks, and also became a number one single on the Cash Box Top 100. By the end of 1992, "Tears in Heaven" sold more than 2,300,000 copies in the United States alone. The pop single also received a lot of airplay, charting 20 weeks on the Top Radio Songs chart, peaking at number three, and reaching position nine on the Mainstream Rock Songs chart, where "Tears in Heaven" stayed for a total of 18 weeks. Also, it was later the fourth-favourite recurrent airplay single, as the Billboard magazine reported in summer of 1992. The 1992 single release was the 6th-best-selling single recording in the United States that year, reaching number six on the Billboard year-end Hot 100 chart as well as the 5th-most successful Adult Contemporary release. It also ranked at number five on the Top Single Sales chart, compiled by the Billboard magazine and reached position 25 on the Top Radio Songs year-end chart in 1992.

In Canada, the Reprise Records single release topped all of the three pop single sales chart in the country and is therefore Clapton's most successful single in Canada to date. The song reached the number one top position on both the Canadian Hot Adult Contemporary Tracks and Top 100 Singles chart, compiled by the RPM magazine. In addition to the already rare success, reaching number one on both of the charts, "Tears in Heaven" was The Record magazine's top retail selling single release. Shortly after the single was released in Canada and topped all of these three record charts, it was certified with a double Platinum sales certification for physical sales exceeding 200,000 copies. In 1992, "Tears in Heaven" was the 17th-best-selling single on RPM magazine's Hot Adult Contemporary Tracks chart.

=== Europe and Oceania ===
The pop single release was especially successful in Europe, reaching the Top 10 in 12 countries and the Top 20 in 15 of them. The single charted at number three on the European Hot 100 Singles chart in 1992, and was Europes 21st best-selling single of 1992. In Austria, the physical single peaked at number 25 on the Ö3 Austria Top 40 singles chart, and eventually charted at number ten in week four, reaching its highest charting position in the country. In total, the single of "Tears in Heaven" spent 12 weeks on the nations single sales chart. It was eventually certified with a Gold disc by the International Federation of the Phonographic Industry (IFPI) in Austria and reached number 61 on the country's year-end chart in 1992. In Flanders (Belgium), the single reached three singles charts. In 1992, it peaked at position 44 on Ultratop's Top 50 single chart, and reached its peak position, 16, in week four and five, while on chart for a total of ten weeks. At that time, the single also peaked at number ten on the Belgian VRT Top 30 singles chart, where "Tears in Heaven" spent eight weeks on chart.

In 2010, when a remastered physical edition of the single was released in Belgium, it reached number 16 on the Back Catalogue chart. The song was Belgium's 159th best-selling single in 1992, and certified with a Platinum disc for sales over 50,000 copies by the Belgian Entertainment Association. In Denmark, "Tears in Heaven" topped the single sales chart and was certified Platinum for sales exceeding 10,000 copies by IFPI Denmark, as it spent a total of 29 weeks on chart. In France, the single peaked at number two on the French singles chart, where it charted for 34 weeks. On chart week 28, it was certified with a Platinum award by the Syndicat National de l'Édition Phonographique (SNEP) for sales of more than 500,000 copies in the country. In Germany, the single placed itself on its lowest charting position, number 42. In total, the single charted for eleven weeks on the German singles chart, and sold more than 170,000 both digital and physical copies to date. "Tears in Heaven" topped the single charts in Ireland and was certified with a Platinum disc by the Irish Recorded Music Association (IRMA), selling more than 50,000 copies in 1992, as it reached both of the year-end charts in 1992 and 1993 with positions five and 47. In Italy, the single reached Top five positions as both a physical as well as a digital download single. In 1992, the single peaked at number four on the Italian single chart, compiled by Musica e dischi. Later, the single re-entered the nations single chart as a digital download and streaming single, reaching number five on the charts, now compiled by the Federazione Industria Musicale Italiana (FIMI).

In addition, the digital single was certified with a Platinum disc, for sales and streams exceeding 30,000 units. The single was a medium successful hit in the Netherlands. It reached position 17 on the Dutch Top 40 singles weekly chart, where it stayed for ten weeks, and reached number 131 on the chart's year-end list in 1992. It also reached the Dutch Single Top 100 chart, peaking at number 13 and staying for 21 weeks on chart, before placing itself on position 87 on the year-end Single 100 chart. In Norway, the single topped the VG-lista singles chart in 1992. In Spain, the single charted at number seven on the nation's singles chart, and was eventually certified with a Gold disc, commemorating the sale of more than 25,000 copies in the country by the Productores de Música de España (PROMUSICAE). In Sweden, "Tears in Heaven" reached number four on the Sverigetopplistan singles chart, where it spent a total of 30 weeks on chart.

In October 1992, it was presented with a Platinum sales award by the Swedish Recording Industry Association (GLF), when it exceeded 50,000 sold units in the country. It reached number 86 on the 1992 Swedish year-end chart. In Switzerland, the single was also a Top ten hit, peaking at number seven on the Schweizer Hitparade, where "Tears in Heaven" stayed for 15 weeks. Here too, the single was presented with a Gold certification by the International Federation of the Phonographic Industry, for sales exceeding 25,000 copies in Switzerland. It was the 38th most-bought single in Switzerland in 1992. "Tears in Heaven" was also a major success for Clapton in his home country, the United Kingdom. The single reached number five on the charts, compiled by the Official Charts Company and spent a total of 14 weeks on the British charts, selling 140,000 copies in the first five weeks. Shortly after, the single was certified with a Gold disc by the British Phonographic Industry (BPI), for sales more than 400,000 copies in the country. With total sales of more than 300,000 copies by the end of 1992, "Tears in Heaven" reached number 56 on Great Britain's 1992 year-end chart.

In Australia, "Tears in Heaven" was a hit record despite charting in the lower positions of the ARIA Singles Chart. In 1992, the pop Reprise Records single placed itself at number 102 on Australia's year-end chart. However, in 1993, it would generate far more single sales, become Australia's 28th best-selling single alongside "Layla". In 1993, the single release was also certified with a Platinum record sales certification by the Australian Recording Industry Association (ARIA) for sales figures exceeding 70,000 physical units. In New Zealand, the single topped the country's single chart for the first five weeks on chart, and spent a total of 18 weeks on the country's single sales chart. On 31 May 1992 – just four weeks on chart in New Zealand – "Tears in Heaven" was certified with a Gold disc by the Recording Industry Association of New Zealand (RIANZ), commemorating the sale of more than 7,500 copies in the country.

=== Asia and South America ===
In Asia, "Tears in Heaven" was mostly successful in Japan, where the Reprise Records single stayed for a total of thirty-seven weeks on the nation's Hot 100 single sales chart, compiled by Oricon. Because "Tears in Heaven" was not released as a maxi single or part of a double A-side by Reprise or Warner Bros. Records in Japan, it was not eligible to chart on any other charts. While charting in Japan in 1992, the pop single release was certified with a triple Platinum disc by the Recording Industry Association of Japan (RIAJ), for sales overstepping the 300,000 sales mark. By the end of 1992, "Tears in Heaven" sold more than 389,000 units in Japan, however, not enough for a quadruple Platinum certification award. For the year-end closing of Oricon, it was revealed, the 1992 single release was the fortieth best-selling release on the Hot 100 Singles chart. On the summary of 1992's most-purchased international singles in Japan, "Tears in Heaven" reached number sixty-three. In Taiwan, the Recording Industry of Taiwan (RIT) awarded the single release with a Gold disc, for digital download sales exceeding more than 175,000 units in the country. On Taiwan's year-end chart of 2007, "Tears in Heaven" ranked at position seventy-seven. The song is also successful in South Korea, singers Kang Susie and Lisa Ha (Ha Soo-bin) once covered the song.

"Tears in Heaven" is Clapton's commercially most successful single release in South America to date, as it reached the single sales charts of three countries. In Argentina, the Reprise Records release topped the country's single charts, compiled by the Cámara Argentina de Productores de Fonogramas y Videogramas (CAPIF). Also, the pop tune topped the singles chart in Brazil, and reached the 1992 year-end charts, placing itself on number fourteen. In Brazil, the single release was certified with a Platinum disc for physical sales of more than 250,000 copies. It is Clapton's highest-selling single in Brazil, as "Change the World" was certified with a Gold disc, and a rare certification for any physical single, as the world's best-selling single "Candle in the Wind 1997" achieved similar sales figures. At last, "Tears in Heaven" peaked at number eight on Asociación Colombiana de Productores de Fonogramas (ASINCOL)'s physical format singles chart in Colombia. It also reached number thirty-eight on the country's year-end chart of 1992, compiled by ASINCOL, and is Clapton's only charting single in the country.

== Personnel ==
Credits adapted from the Rush soundtrack's liner notes.

- Eric Clapton – vocals, acoustic and electric guitars, Dobro
- Randy Kerber – synthesizer
- JayDee Maness – pedal steel guitar
- Nathan East – bass guitar
- Gayle Levant – Celtic harp
- Lenny Castro – percussion
- Jimmy Bralower – drum programming

== Legacy ==
Clapton made numerous public service announcements to raise awareness for childproofing windows and staircases. In 2004 Clapton stopped performing "Tears in Heaven" as well as the song "My Father's Eyes", stating: "I didn't feel the loss anymore, which is so much a part of performing those songs. I really have to connect with the feelings that were there when I wrote them. They're kind of gone and I really don't want them to come back, particularly. My life is different now. They probably just need a rest and maybe I'll introduce them for a much more detached point of view." Eventually, however, both songs would make it back into Clapton's regular setlists, with the latter being performed as recently as 2013, and the former in 2022.

== Awards and nominations ==
Year	Ceremony	Award	Result	Ref.
1992	Billboard	Best-Selling Soundtrack Single	Won	
1992	Golden Globe Awards	Best Original Song	Nominated	
1992	MTV Movie Awards	Best Song from a Movie	Nominated	
1992	MTV Video Music Awards	Best Cinematography	Nominated	
1992	MTV Video Music Awards	Best Male Video	Won	
1992	MTV Video Music Awards	Best Video from a Film	Nominated	
1993	Grammy Awards	Best Instrumental Composition	Nominated	
1993	Grammy Awards	Best Pop Vocal Performance Male	Won	
1993	Grammy Awards	Best Song Written Specifically for a Motion Picture or for Television	Nominated	
1993	Grammy Awards	Record of the Year	Won	
1993	Grammy Awards	Song of the Year	Won	
1994	BMI	Most Performed Pop Songs	Won	
2004	Rock and Roll Hall of Fame	Songs That Shaped Rock and Roll	Won	
2004	Rolling Stone	The 500 Greatest Songs of All Time	#362	
2015	About	Top 10 Best Songs of 1992	#5	
2015	About	Top 100 90s Pop Songs	#81	

== Charts ==
=== Weekly charts ===
Chart (1992–2013)	Peak position
Argentina (CAPIF)	1
Australia (ARIA)	37
Austria (Ö3 Austria Top 40)	10
Belgium (Back Catalogue Flanders)	16
Belgium (Ultratop 50 Flanders)	16
Belgium (VRT Top 30 Flanders)	10
Brazil (ABPD)	1
Canada Retail Singles (The Record)	1
Canada Top Singles (RPM)	1
Canada Adult Contemporary (RPM)	1
Colombia (ASINCOL)	8
Denmark (Tracklisten)	1
Europe (European Hot 100)	3
France (SNEP)	2
Germany (GfK)	42
Iceland (IFPI)	1
Ireland (IRMA)	1
Italy (Musica e dischi)	4
Japan (Oricon International Singles)	1
Netherlands (Dutch Top 40)	17
Netherlands (Single Top 100)	13
New Zealand (Recorded Music NZ)	1
Sweden (Sverigetopplistan)	4
Switzerland (Schweizer Hitparade)	7
UK Singles (Official Charts)	5
UK Airplay (Music Week)	17
US Billboard Hot 100	2
US Adult Contemporary (Billboard)	1
US Mainstream Rock Airplay (Billboard)	9
US Cash Box Top 100	1

=== Year-end charts ===
Chart (1992)	Position
Australia (ARIA)	102
Austria (Ö3 Austria Top 40)	61
Belgium (Ultratop 50 Flanders)	159
Brazil (ABPD)	14
Canada Top Singles (RPM)	10
Canada Adult Contemporary (RPM)	17
Colombia (ASINCOL)	38
Europe (European Hot 100)	21
Ireland (IRMA)	5
Japan (Oricon Hot 100 Singles)	40
Japan (Oricon International Singles)	63
Netherlands (Dutch Top 40)	131
Netherlands (Single Top 100)	87
New Zealand (RIANZ)	6
Sweden (Topplistan)	86
Switzerland (Schweizer Hitparade)	38
UK Singles (OCC)	56
US Billboard Hot 100	6
US Adult Contemporary (Billboard)	5
US Cash Box Top 100	12

Chart (1993)	Position
Australia (ARIA)	28
Ireland (IRMA)	47

Chart (2007)	Position
Taiwan (G-Music)	77

== Certifications ==
Region	Certification	Certified units/sales
Australia (ARIA)	Gold	35,000^{^}
Italy (FIMI)	Gold	35,000^{‡}
Japan (RIAJ) Change the World / Tears in Heaven	Platinum	100,000^{^}
Japan (RIAJ) Digital single	Gold	100,000^{*}
New Zealand (RMNZ)	2× Platinum	60,000^{‡}
United Kingdom (BPI)	Gold	400,000^{‡}
United States (RIAA) Physical single	Platinum	2,800,000 (Note: Combined digital and physical sales)
United States (RIAA)	Gold	500,000^{*}
^{*} Sales figures based on certification alone.^{^} Shipments figures based on certification alone.^{‡} Sales+streaming figures based on certification alone.

== Other performances ==
In January 2005, Ozzy Osbourne and Sharon Osbourne assembled an all-star cast to collaborate on "Tears in Heaven". Sales from the recording benefited the Disasters Emergency Committee's Tsunami Earthquake appeal and the tsunami victims in Southeast Asia. The line up included Gwen Stefani, Mary J. Blige, Pink, Slash, Duff "Rose" McKagan, Steven Tyler, Elton John, Phil Collins, Ringo Starr, Andrea Bocelli, Katie Melua, Josh Groban, Scott Weiland, Paul Santo, Robbie Williams, and Rod Stewart. Ozzy Osbourne and Kelly Osbourne also sang on the song.

== See also ==
- List of Hot Adult Contemporary number ones of 1992
