= Cunin =

Cunin is a surname. Notable people with the surname include:

- Adelard Cunin, a.k.a. Bugs Moran (1893–1957), American gangster
- Marina Cunin, American social anthropologist
- Shlomo Cunin, American rabbi
- Tzemach Cunin (1976–2019), American rabbi

== See also ==
- Kunin (surname)
