= Journeyman World Tour =

1989–91 concert tour by Eric Clapton

- World tour by Eric Clapton
- Promotional poster for the tour
- Associated album: Journeyman
- Start date: July 6, 1989
- End date: March 9, 1991
- No. of shows: 165

Eric Clapton concert chronology
- Clapton-Knopfler Tour (1988); Journeyman World Tour (1989–91); Clapton-Harrison Tour (1991)

The Journeyman World Tour was a 2 1/2-year concert tour by English musician Eric Clapton that began on July 6, 1989, in The Hague and concluded on March 9, 1991, in London. The tour was Clapton's first tour following the release of his 1989 studio album Journeyman. The guitarist played a total of 165 shows throughout Europe, North America, Asia, South America and Africa.

== Setlist ==
This set list is representative of the tour's average setlist as conducted by Setlist.fm, which represents all concerts for the duration of the tour.

1. "Pretending"
2. "Running on Faith"
3. "No Alibis"
4. "I Shot the Sheriff"
5. "White Room"
6. "Can't Find My Way Home"
7. "Bad Love"
8. "Before You Accuse Me"
9. "Old Love"
10. "Badge"
11. "Wonderful Tonight"
12. "Cocaine"
13. "Layla"
14. "Cross Road Blues"
15. "Sunshine of Your Love"

== Personnel ==
- Eric Clapton–guitar, lead vocals
- Alan Clark–keyboards (U.S. and Europe only)
- Ray Cooper–percussion, shouted vocal during Sunshine of Your Love percussion solo
- Nathan East–bass guitar, vocals
- Steve Ferrone–drums
- Katie Kissoon–backing vocals
- Tessa Niles–backing vocals
- Phil Palmer–guitar
- Greg Phillinganes–keyboards, vocals
- Chuck Leavell–keyboards (1991 Ireland and U.K. dates)

== Tour dates ==
Date	City	Country	Venue	Attendance	Box office
Eurasia
6 July 1989	The Hague	Netherlands	Statenhal	—N/a	
7 July 1989	The Hague	Netherlands	Statenhal	—N/a	
9 July 1989	Zürich	Switzerland	Hallenstadion	—N/a	
10 July 1989	Zürich	Switzerland	Hallenstadion	—N/a	
13 July 1989	Jerusalem	Israel	Merrill Hassenfeld Amphitheater	—N/a	
14 July 1989	Zemach	Israel	Zemach Amphitheatre	—N/a	
15 July 1989	Caesarea	Israel	Caesarea Amphitheatre	—N/a	
17 July 1989	Caesarea	Israel	Caesarea Amphitheatre	—N/a	
Africa
20 July 1989	Cairo	Egypt	Stad El Qahira El Dawly	—N/a	
22 July 1989	Lobamba	Eswatini	Somhlolo National Stadium	—N/a	
23 July 1989	Lobamba	Eswatini	Somhlolo National Stadium	—N/a	
25 July 1989	Harare	Zimbabwe	International Conference Center	—N/a	
26 July 1989	Harare	Zimbabwe	International Conference Center	—N/a	
28 July 1989	Gaborone	Botswana	Boipuso Hall	—N/a	
30 July 1989	Maputo	Mozambique	Estádio da Machava	40,000	—N/a
Europe
14 January 1990	Birmingham	England	National Exhibition Centre	—	—
15 January 1990	Birmingham	England	National Exhibition Centre	—	—
16 January 1990	Birmingham	England	National Exhibition Centre	—	—
18 January 1990	London	England	Royal Albert Hall	—	—
19 January 1990	London	England	Royal Albert Hall	—	—
20 January 1990	London	England	Royal Albert Hall	—	—
22 January 1990	London	England	Royal Albert Hall	—	—
23 January 1990	London	England	Royal Albert Hall	—	—
24 January 1990	London	England	Royal Albert Hall	—	—
26 January 1990	London	England	Royal Albert Hall	—	—
27 January 1990	London	England	Royal Albert Hall	—	—
28 January 1990	London	England	Royal Albert Hall	—	—
30 January 1990	London	England	Royal Albert Hall	—	—
31 January 1990	London	England	Royal Albert Hall	—	—
1 February 1990	London	England	Royal Albert Hall	—	—
3 February 1990	London	England	Royal Albert Hall	—	—
4 February 1990	London	England	Royal Albert Hall	—	—
5 February 1990	London	England	Royal Albert Hall	—	—
8 February 1990	London	England	Royal Albert Hall	—	—
9 February 1990	London	England	Royal Albert Hall	—	—
10 February 1990	London	England	Royal Albert Hall	—	—
14 February 1990	Helsinki	Finland	The Icehall	—	—
16 February 1990	Stockholm	Sweden	Globen Arena	—	—
17 February 1990	Oslo	Norway	Skedsmohallen	—	—
19 February 1990	Copenhagen	Denmark	K.B. Hallen	—	—
20 February 1990	Hamburg	West Germany	Sporthalle Arena	—	—
22 February 1990	Brussels	Belgium	Forest National	—	—
23 February 1990	Essen	West Germany	Grugahalle	—	—
24 February 1990	The Hague	Netherlands	Statenhal	—	—
26 February 1990	Milan	Italy	Palatrussardi	—	—
27 February 1990	Milan	Italy	Palatrussardi	—	—
1 March 1990	Munich	West Germany	Olympiahalle	—	—
3 March 1990	Paris	France	Le Zénith	—	—
4 March 1990	Paris	France	Le Zénith	—	—
5 March 1990	Frankfurt	West Germany	Festhalle Frankfurt	—	—
North America
28 March 1990	Atlanta	United States	Omni Coliseum		
30 March 1990	Charlotte	United States	Charlotte Coliseum		
31 March 1990	Chapel Hill	United States	Dean E. Smith Center		
2 April 1990	New York City	United States	Madison Square Garden		
3 April 1990	East Rutherford	United States	Brendan Byrne Arena		
4 April 1990	Philadelphia	United States	The Spectrum		
6 April 1990	Uniondale	United States	Nassau Veterans Memorial Coliseum		
7 April 1990	Syracuse	United States	Carrier Dome		
9 April 1990	Worcester	United States	Worcester Centrum		
10 April 1990	Worcester	United States	Worcester Centrum		
12 April 1990	Hartford	United States	Hartford Civic Center		
13 April 1990	Hartford	United States	Hartford Civic Center		
15 April 1990	Auburn Hills	United States	The Palace of Auburn Hills		
16 April 1990	Cincinnati	United States	Riverfront Coliseum		
17 April 1990	Cleveland	United States	Richfield Coliseum		
19 April 1990	Indianapolis	United States	Market Square Arena		
20 April 1990	Ames	United States	Hilton Coliseum		
21 April 1990	St. Louis	United States	St. Louis Arena		
23 April 1990	New Orleans	United States	Lakefront Arena		
24 April 1990	Houston	United States	The Summit		
25 April 1990	Dallas	United States	Reunion Arena		
27 April 1990	Denver	United States	McNichols Sports Arena		
29 April 1990	Albuquerque	United States	Tingley Coliseum		
30 April 1990	Tempe	United States	ASU Activity Center		
1 May 1990	Inglewood	United States	Great Western Forum		
3 May 1990	San Diego	United States	San Diego Sports Arena		
4 May 1990	Costa Mesa	United States	Pacific Amphitheatre		
5 May 1990	Mountain View	United States	Shoreline Amphitheatre		
21 July 1990	Miami	United States	Miami Arena		
22 July 1990	Miami	United States	Miami Arena		
23 July 1990	Miami	United States	Miami Arena		
25 July 1990	Orlando	United States	Orlando Arena		
27 July 1990	Saint Petersburg	United States	Suncoast Dome		
28 July 1990	Atlanta	United States	Lakewood Amphitheatre		
30 July 1990	Nashville	United States	Starwood Amphitheatre		
31 July 1990	Memphis	United States	Mid-South Coliseum		
2 August 1990	Greensboro	United States	Greensboro Coliseum		
3 August 1990	Landover	United States	Capital Centre		
4 August 1990	Landover	United States	Capital Centre		
6 August 1990	East Rutherford	United States	Brendan Byrne Arena		
7 August 1990	East Rutherford	United States	Brendan Byrne Arena		
9 August 1990	Mansfield	United States	Great Woods Center for the Performing Arts		
10 August 1990	Mansfield	United States	Great Woods Center for the Performing Arts		
11 August 1990	Mansfield	United States	Great Woods Center for the Performing Arts		
13 August 1990	Saratoga Springs	United States	Saratoga Performing Arts Center		
14 August 1990	Philadelphia	United States	The Spectrum		
15 August 1990	Philadelphia	United States	The Spectrum		
17 August 1990	Uniondale	United States	Nassau Veterans Memorial Coliseum		
18 August 1990	Uniondale	United States	Nassau Veterans Memorial Coliseum		
21 August 1990	Cleveland	United States	Blossom Music Center		
22 August 1990	Detroit	United States	Pine Knob Pavilion		
23 August 1990	Cincinnati	United States	Riverbend Music Center		
25 August 1990	East Troy	United States	Alpine Valley Music Theatre		
26 August 1990	East Troy	United States	Alpine Valley Music Theatre		
28 August 1990	Bonner Springs	United States	Sandstone Amphitheater		
29 August 1990	St. Louis	United States	St. Louis Arena		
31 August 1990	Knoxville	United States	Thompson–Boling Arena		
1 September 1990	Birmingham	United States	Oak Mountain Amphitheatre		
2 September 1990	Biloxi	United States	Mississippi Coast Coliseum		
South America
29 September 1990	Santiago	Chile	Estadio Nacional	46,000	—N/a
3 October 1990	Montevideo	Uruguay	Estadio Centenario	50,000	—N/a
5 October 1990	Buenos Aires	Argentina	Estadio River Plate	70,000	—N/a
7 October 1990	Rio de Janeiro	Brazil	Praça da Apoteose	40,000	—N/a
9 October 1990	Brasília	Brazil	Ginásio Nilson Nelson	—N/a	
11 October 1990	Belo Horizonte	Brazil	Ginásio Mineirinho	30,000	—N/a
13 October 1990	Florianópolis	Brazil	Estádio Orlando Scarpelli	25,000	—N/a
16 October 1990	Porto Alegre	Brazil	Ginásio Gigantinho	15,000	—N/a
19 October 1990	São Paulo	Brazil	Olympia	5,000	—N/a
20 October 1990	São Paulo	Brazil	Olympia	5,000	—N/a
21 October 1990	São Paulo	Brazil	Olympia	5,000	—N/a
Oceania
7 November 1990	Auckland	New Zealand	Supertop	—	—
8 November 1990	Auckland	New Zealand	Supertop	—	—
10 November 1990	Canberra	Australia	Royal Theatre	—	—
12 November 1990	Adelaide	Australia	Festival Theatre	—	—
13 November 1990	Adelaide	Australia	Festival Theatre	—	—
15 November 1990	Melbourne	Australia	National Tennis Centre	—	—
16 November 1990	Sydney	Australia	Entertainment Centre	—	—
17 November 1990	Sydney	Australia	Entertainment Centre	—	—
19 November 1990	Brisbane	Australia	Entertainment Centre	—	—
Asia
24 November 1990	Singapore		Indoor Stadium	—	—
26 November 1990	Kuala Lumpur	Malaysia	Stadium Negara	—	—
29 November 1990	Hong Kong		The Coliseum	—	—
4 December 1990	Tokyo	Japan	Nippon Budokan	—	—
5 December 1990	Tokyo	Japan	Nippon Budokan	—	—
6 December 1990	Tokyo	Japan	Nippon Budokan	—	—
9 December 1990	Tokyo	Japan	Yoyogi Olympic Pool	—	—
10 December 1990	Nagoya	Japan	Rainbow Hall	—	—
11 December 1990	Osaka	Japan	Osaka-jō Hall	—	—
13 December 1990	Yokohama	Japan	Yokohama Arena	—	—
Europe
31 January 1991	Dublin	Ireland	The Point	—N/a	
2 February 1991	Dublin	Ireland	The Point	—N/a	
5 February 1991	London	England	Royal Albert Hall	—N/a	
6 February 1991	London	England	Royal Albert Hall	—N/a	
7 February 1991	London	England	Royal Albert Hall	—N/a	
9 February 1991	London	England	Royal Albert Hall	—N/a	
10 February 1991	London	England	Royal Albert Hall	—N/a	
11 February 1991	London	England	Royal Albert Hall	—N/a	
13 February 1991	London	England	Royal Albert Hall	—N/a	
14 February 1991	London	England	Royal Albert Hall	—N/a	
15 February 1991	London	England	Royal Albert Hall	—N/a	
17 February 1991	London	England	Royal Albert Hall	—N/a	
18 February 1991	London	England	Royal Albert Hall	—N/a	
19 February 1991	London	England	Royal Albert Hall	—N/a	
23 February 1991	London	England	Royal Albert Hall	—N/a	
24 February 1991	London	England	Royal Albert Hall	—N/a	
25 February 1991	London	England	Royal Albert Hall	—N/a	
27 February 1991	London	England	Royal Albert Hall	—N/a	
28 February 1991	London	England	Royal Albert Hall	—N/a	
1 March 1991	London	England	Royal Albert Hall	—N/a	
3 March 1991	London	England	Royal Albert Hall	—N/a	
4 March 1991	London	England	Royal Albert Hall	—N/a	
5 March 1991	London	England	Royal Albert Hall	—N/a	
7 March 1991	London	England	Royal Albert Hall	—N/a	
8 March 1991	London	England	Royal Albert Hall	—N/a	
9 March 1991	London	England	Royal Albert Hall	—N/a	
TOTAL					

== Reception ==
LGN music critics liked the world tour and especially recognised Eric Clapton's guitar tone throughout the whole Journeyman World Tour, stating: "this period saw a resurrection of Clapton going back to basics. The tones he captured during this era are really amazing. [...] Eric was mainly using a Soldano SLO-100 amp head giving him a very saturated blues tone". Fellow guitar slinger Joe Bonamassa recalled a great Journeyman show, he saw as a teenager and also liked the way Eric Clapton made things sound at the time, calling Eric Clapton's Journeyman tone "one of the best tones Clapton has ever had".
