= Science and technology in Botswana =

Overview of science, technology, and innovation in Botswana

Science, Innovation and Technology in Botswana
- Country: Botswana
- Regulatory authority: Botswana Communications Regulatory Authority (BOCRA)
- National satellite: BOTSAT-1 (launched 15 March 2025)
- Science and technology park: Botswana Digital and Innovation Hub (BDIH)
- Key institutions: Botswana International University of Science and Technology (BIUST); University of Botswana (UB); Botswana Institute for Technology Research and Innovation (BITRI)
- Mobile operators: Mascom Wireless; Orange Botswana; Botswana Telecommunications Corporation Limited (BTCL)
- Notable programmes: Botswana Innovation Fund; BrainSTREAM Institute of Technology; Fintech Association of Botswana; Women in Tech Accelerator Programme
- Global Innovation Index rank: 87th (2025)
- R&D as share of GDP: 0.54% (2013)

Science, innovation and technology in Botswana covers the historical development of science policy, telecommunications, digital infrastructure, space technology, financial technology, and innovation ecosystems in Botswana, a landlocked country in southern Africa. The Republic of Botswana was one of the first countries of the Southern African Development Community (SADC) to adopt a science and technology policy, doing so in 1998, and updated it in 2011. The country has diversified significantly from a diamond-dependent economy toward a knowledge-based economy since the 2000s, with milestones including the launch of its first national satellite in 2025.

== Socio-economic context ==
The Republic of Botswana has one of the longest post-independence histories of political stability in Africa. A multiparty democracy, it is deemed the continent's best-performing country by the Corruption Perceptions Index and ranked third in 2014 in the Ibrahim Index of African Governance.

At the time of independence in 1966, Botswana was one of the poorest countries in the world. A year later, diamonds were discovered and have since become a pillar of the economy. Between 2009 and 2013, GDP per capita rose from $12,404 to $15,247 (in purchasing power parity dollars, 2011 constant prices), boosted by the global commodity boom, corresponding to a leap of 23 percent in GDP per capita over that period. Within the SADC region, only the Seychelles and Mauritius have higher levels of average income. Although real GDP per capita is relatively high and growing, the country ranks second in the SADC for inequality and there is widespread poverty. The unemployment rate stood at 18 percent in 2013, and Botswana's incidence of HIV at 18.5 percent of the population was among the highest in the world according to the Botswana AIDS Impact Survey of 2013.

=== Economic diversification ===
As of 2015, Botswana was the world's top producer of diamonds by value. Despite heavy reliance on the mining sector, Botswana has escaped the resource curse to a large extent by delinking public expenditure and revenue from the mining sector, investing diamond revenues in a savings fund to enable an anti-cyclical fiscal policy and in public goods, infrastructure, and universal scholarship schemes that fully subsidise education at all levels.

Diversifying the economy was made a priority of the Tenth National Development Plan for 2009 to 2016, with the government considering private-sector participation critical and R&D the most effective way of fuelling entrepreneurship. In 2010, the government published its Economic Diversification Drive. In 2011, it revised the Companies Act to allow company registration without company secretaries, reducing start-up costs, and introduced a points-based system to allow skilled expatriates to work in Botswana.

Diversification is also a priority of the Eleventh National Development Plan for 2017 to 2023, guided by Vision 2036 (2016), Botswana's blueprint for achieving high-income status by 2036. Focus areas of comparative advantage include financial services, education, health, diamonds, beef, tourism, and mining. Special economic zones are being developed around Sir Seretse Khama International Airport and in the Padamatenga area to attract investment.

== Science, technology and innovation policy ==
=== National innovation system ===
Botswana is considered as having an evolving national innovation system. It was ranked 87th in the Global Innovation Index in 2025. The following table shows the status of national innovation systems across the Southern African Development Community as assessed in 2015.

Category	Countries	Description
Fragile	Democratic Republic of Congo, Lesotho, Madagascar, Swaziland, Zimbabwe	Fragile systems tend to be characterised by political instability, from external threats or internal political schisms.
Viable	Angola, Malawi, Mozambique, Namibia, Seychelles, Tanzania, Zambia	Viable systems encompass thriving systems but also faltering ones, in a context of political stability.
Evolving	Botswana, Mauritius, South Africa	In evolving systems, countries are mutating through the effects of policy, and their mutation may also affect the emerging regional system of innovation.

Source: Mbula-Kraemer, Erika and Scerri, Mario (2015) Southern Africa. In: UNESCO Science Report: towards 2030. UNESCO, Paris, Table 20.5.

=== National science and technology policy ===
In 2008, the Minister of Communication, Science and Technology requested UNESCO's assistance in reviewing the country's first Science and Technology Policy, which dated from 1998. Botswana published its updated National Policy on Research, Science and Technology in 2011, within a UNESCO project sponsored by the Spanish Agency for International Cooperation and Development.

The policy was considered to have achieved some advances but to have failed to overcome insufficient investment in R&D and insufficient job and wealth creation. The revised 2011 policy was consolidated with the 2005 Botswana Research, Science and Technology Plan and has four main thrusts: development of a coordinated and integrated approach to science, technology and innovation planning; development of STI indicators in accordance with the Frascati Manual and Oslo Manual of the Organisation for Economic Co-operation and Development; the launch of regular participatory foresight exercises; and the strengthening of institutional structures responsible for policy monitoring and implementation.

In 2013, the Minister of Education and Skills Pelonomi Venson-Moitoi highlighted challenges facing Botswana at the launch of a UNESCO study of the country's national innovation system, citing the need to improve intellectual property protection and commercialisation of R&D products, and noting the funding dilemma of weighing R&D investment against immediate development needs such as healthcare infrastructure. The Botswana Academy of Sciences was launched in November 2015.

=== Digital legislation (2025) ===
In August 2025, Botswana's Parliament passed two significant pieces of digital legislation. The Digital Services Bill promotes equitable access to affordable digital services, particularly in underserved communities, and establishes a framework for a Digital Services Authority. The Cybersecurity Bill establishes structures to promote cybersecurity capacity building across the country. Both bills mark a significant step in the formalisation of Botswana's digital regulatory environment.

=== AI policy ===
In 2025, Botswana's government was working on a national Artificial Intelligence policy following an AI Readiness Foundation initiative undertaken in partnership with UNESCO, which assessed the country's readiness in terms of methods, inclusivity, security, and alignment with national development goals. The Vice President, Ndaba Gaolathe, described the government's strategy as building an ecosystem for AI, fintech, agritech, cleantech, and health tech, with investment in infrastructure, talent, and policy support.

== Telecommunications ==
=== Botswana Telecommunications Corporation (1980) ===
The Botswana Telecommunications Corporation (BTC) was established in 1980 as a 100 percent government-owned parastatal to provide, develop, operate, and manage Botswana's national and international telecommunications services. For its first sixteen years, BTC operated as the sole telecommunications provider in the country. Its network was built on an all-digital microwave and fibre optic system with digital exchanges at the main centres, comprising 7,300 kilometres of microwave radio and fibre optic links.

=== Liberalisation and mobile competition (1996 to 1999) ===
In 1996, an amendment of the BTC Act repealed BTC's monopoly and introduced competition through two cellular joint venture consortiums: Mascom Wireless and Vista Communications, later renamed Orange Botswana. Both were awarded fifteen-year mobile operating licences with a ten-year exclusivity period. The Botswana Communications Regulatory Authority (BOCRA), initially established as the Botswana Telecommunications Authority, was created as the sector regulator. The first Internet Service Provider licences were also issued during this period. In 1999, the BTA simultaneously licensed Botswana's first two commercial FM radio stations, Yarona FM and Gabz FM.

=== Privatisation and expansion (2000s to 2010s) ===
In 2006, the government decided to privatise BTC. Parliament enacted the BTC (Transition) Act in 2008, creating Botswana Fibre Networks (BoFiNet) as a wholesale provider of national and international telecommunications infrastructure while BTC remained a retail operator. In 2008, BTC launched its own mobile network under the brand name beMOBILE. On 1 November 2012, BTC was formally converted from a statutory body into a public company limited by shares and renamed Botswana Telecommunications Corporation Limited (BTCL), becoming the first state-owned enterprise to be privatised through a stock exchange listing when it listed on the Botswana Stock Exchange in 2016. The government currently holds 54.16 percent of issued share capital.

Since 2009, Mascom has established a network of rural community centres known as Mascom Kitsong Centres, which provide access to internet and other digital services including mobile money and computer training. By May 2018, there were 110 such centres in as many villages. In 2016, Mascom launched the e-Schools Project, which by July 2019 had connected 623 government schools to internet. In 2020, Mascom provided free internet access to the government's Covid-19 tracker system, developed in collaboration with UNICEF, the University of Oslo, and other partners.

=== Current market structure ===
The telecommunications market is currently served by three Public Telecommunications Operators: BTCL, Mascom Wireless (an affiliate of South Africa's MTN Group), and Orange Botswana (backed by Orange Group). Mascom led the mobile market by subscriber numbers as of 2023. BoFiNet provides wholesale national and international infrastructure including fibre connections to businesses and homes. BOCRA reports 4G coverage at 98.2 percent of the country and 5G coverage at 41.89 percent as of 2025. The entry of SpaceX Starlink satellite internet service has extended high-speed internet access to remote areas where ground-based infrastructure has been limited.

In 2018, Parliament passed the Data Protection Act establishing the Information and Data Protection Commission, enshrining the right of citizens to access their personal data and to object to its processing.

== Higher education and research ==
=== Universities ===
In 2014, Botswana had two public and seven private universities. The University of Botswana is primarily a teaching institution. The Botswana International University of Science and Technology (BIUST), which welcomed its first 267 students in September 2012, is a research university. By the 2018/2019 academic year there were 1,881 students enrolled at BIUST, 33 percent of whom were women. BIUST's research focus areas include remote sensing of natural resources and the environment, sustainable energy and resource beneficiation, solar energy materials, applied nuclear sciences and technology, bioinformatics, data science and high performance computing, and artificial intelligence and smart systems.

Among SADC countries, Botswana committed the second-largest share of GDP to expenditure on education (9.5 percent) after Lesotho in 2009, and devoted the largest share of GDP to higher education expenditure (3.9 percent) after Lesotho. Between 2006 and 2011, the number of students enrolled in higher education rose from 22,257 to 39,894. Under the EU-funded Pan-African Planetary and Space Science Network, BIUST received a grant of €1.4 million to prepare young scientists for projects including the Square Kilometre Array.

=== Investment in research and development ===
Botswana devoted 0.26 percent of GDP to R&D in 2012, with three-quarters of this investment coming from the government, 6 percent from the business enterprise sector, and 7 percent from abroad. The National Policy on Research, Science, Technology and Innovation (2011) set a target of raising gross domestic expenditure on R&D to over 2 percent of GDP by 2016. Spending on R&D as a share of GDP rose to 0.54 percent in 2013, the most recent year with data as of 2021.

Gross domestic spending on research and development as a share of GDP in Southern Africa, 2012 or closest year. Source: UNESCO Science Report: towards 2030

Researchers (HC) in Southern Africa per million inhabitants, 2013 or closest year. Source: UNESCO Science Report: towards 2030, data from UNESCO Institute for Statistics

Despite the modest level of financial investment, Botswana counts one of the highest researcher densities in sub-Saharan Africa at 344 researchers per million inhabitants, compared to an average of 91 per million across sub-Saharan Africa in 2013. One in four Botswana researchers (27 percent) was a woman in 2012. Women researchers had almost obtained parity in medical sciences by 2013 (44 percent) and were well represented in social sciences and humanities (38 percent) and natural sciences (28 percent), but remained rare in engineering (8 percent).

=== Scientific publishing ===
The number of publications by Botswana scientists catalogued in international databases increased from 133 to 210 between 2009 and 2014 according to Thomson Reuters' Web of Science. In 2018, there were 281 scientific and technical journal articles originating from Botswana. Botswana has one of the highest levels of scientific productivity per capita in sub-Saharan Africa, behind South Africa. Between 2008 and 2014, scientists from Botswana collaborated primarily with peers from the United States, followed by South Africa, the United Kingdom, Canada, and Germany.

== Botswana Digital and Innovation Hub ==
The Botswana Digital and Innovation Hub (BDIH), also known as the Botswana Innovation Hub (BIH), is Botswana's first science and technology park. It is a government parastatal under the Ministry of Tertiary Education, Research, Science and Technology, located on a 57-hectare site near Sir Seretse Khama International Airport in Gaborone. The hub was conceptualised as part of the Botswana Excellence Strategy of 2008, which set out national goals of economic diversification and transitioning toward a knowledge-based economy. Its buildings were designed by SHoP Architects of New York.

The centrepiece of the government's economic diversification strategy has been the development of six innovation hubs. These include an agricultural hub, the Botswana Diamond Hub (with a Diamond Technology Park established in Gaborone in 2009), the BDIH as the flagship innovation hub, an education hub, a health hub, and a transport hub. By the end of 2012, the BDIH's governing bodies had approved and registered 17 entities to operate in the park, covering areas including ICT applications, diamond jewellery design, mining exploration technologies, and software development.

Scientific publications per million inhabitants in Southern Africa, 2013. Source: UNESCO Science Report: towards 2030 (2015), data from Thomson Reuters' Web of Science, Science Citation Index Expanded

BDIH works across five priority sectors: mining technology, biotechnology, cleantech, information and communications technology, and indigenous knowledge. Its programmes include the Botswana Innovation Fund, which began in 2018 and distributes grants to technology-based startups (its first call allocated BWP 5.6 million to seven projects including an Intelligent Traffic Management System), the BOOST UP Programme supporting early-stage startups using technology to address social challenges across southern Africa, and partnerships with organisations including the Massachusetts Institute of Technology Kuo Sharper Centre, which began an eleven-week business incubation programme in partnership with BDIH in 2025. Over 2017 to 2018, the hub supported more than 100 startups.

Trends in scientific publications from Southern Africa, 2005-2012. Source: UNESCO Science Report: towards 2030 (2015), data from Thomson Reuters' Web of Science, Science Citation Index Expanded

== BOTSAT-1 and space technology ==
BOTSAT-1 (Botswana Satellite 1) is the first satellite developed and operated by Botswana. It was launched on 15 March 2025 aboard a SpaceX Falcon 9 rocket as part of the Transporter-13 rideshare mission from Vandenberg Space Force Base in California, bringing Africa's total satellite count to 65. The satellite is a 3U CubeSat built by Bulgarian satellite manufacturer EnduroSat in collaboration with engineers from BIUST.

The program was conceptualized around 2020 and developed without a formal space agency, with BIUST taking on the role that a space agency would normally play. The project was led by Dr Dimane Mpoeleng as Project Lead and Dr Modisa Mosalaosi as Lead Engineer, and involved approximately 80 volunteers including 10 postgraduate students. BIUST engineers completed the Assembly, Integration and Testing phase at EnduroSat's facilities in Sofia, Bulgaria, in September 2024. The total project cost was approximately US$2.19 million over four years, funded by an annual government commitment of BWP 33 million through the Ministry of Communications and Innovation and the Ministry of Higher Education.

BOTSAT-1 carries the Mantis Hyperspectral Imager, manufactured by South African company Dragonfly Aerospace, providing a spatial resolution of approximately 12 meters and a swath width of 32 kilometers. It completes approximately six orbital passes over Botswana per day and transmits data to BIUST's ground station in Palapye, upgraded to X-band capability at a cost of approximately US$200,000. Applications include precision agriculture, mineral mapping for the mining sector, environmental monitoring, disaster management, and urban planning.

Botswana's President Duma Boko attended the launch as part of a working visit to the United States. The first signal received from BOTSAT-1 after deployment was a transmission of the Botswana national anthem in Setswana. A school outreach program run around the same time brought 350 students from 34 senior secondary schools to participate in satellite tracking and simulation activities.

Following the success of BOTSAT-1, the government confirmed plans for BOTSAT-2, led by BIUST and supported by BITRI, intended to offer more advanced Earth observation capabilities. BIUST also launched a Master's Program in Space Engineering and Technology with international exchange opportunities to sustain a pipeline of space engineering graduates.

== Financial technology ==
The Fintech Association of Botswana (FAB), also known as Fintechs Botswana, is a non-profit industry association established in 2020 to connect participants in Botswana's financial technology sector, including banks, insurance companies, telecommunications companies, startups, and regulators. It is a member of the Africa Fintech Network. The association has worked to establish fintech offices within the Non-Bank Financial Institutions Regulatory Authority (NBFIRA) and the Bank of Botswana, contributing to a more defined regulatory framework for the sector.

In 2024, FAB became the first member of the Alliance of Digital Finance and Fintech Associations (DFA) to complete all requirements of the DFA Accelerator Programme, receiving the Certificate of Proficiency from the Alliance.

Botswana's mobile money market had 1.8 million subscriptions by December 2023, up from 1.65 million a year earlier. Mobile money services are provided by Orange Money (Orange Botswana), MyZaka (Mascom), Smega (BTCL), and Poso Money (BotswanaPost). Orange Money held approximately 53 percent market share as of early 2024.

== STEM education and innovation programs ==
BrainSTREAM Institute of Technology is a Botswana-based educational technology company delivering robotics, coding, and STEM education to children and teachers. Its teacher training course is accredited by the Human Resource Development Council of Botswana (HRDC) and has trained over 100 educators in Botswana and the region. BrainSTREAM is an outreach partner of BDIH for FIRST Lego League Challenge teacher training and participates in the All Schools Robotics Make-a-Thon Convention, an annual multi-school event in Gaborone supported by First National Bank Botswana. In 2025, BrainSTREAM extended its holiday camp model into five cities in South Africa and announced robotics and coding camps in Harare, Zimbabwe.

The Women in Tech Accelerator Program (WiT Botswana), run jointly by Standard Chartered Botswana and Dream Factory Foundation Botswana, supports women-led businesses in technology, fintech, agritech, e-commerce, and health innovation. It began in 2024 and distributes seed funding through annual cohorts. The second cohort in November 2025 distributed over P700,000 in seed funding to six businesses across sectors including events technology, climate-smart agriculture, digital services, agritech logistics, livestock farming, and ethical fashion.

The Botswana Mobile and Internet Summit (BITMIS), launched in 2022 by director Phuthego Chere, is an annual technology conference held at the University of Botswana Conference Centre in Gaborone. The summit addresses four concurrent streams: Cyber Security Summit, Cyber Security Masterclass, Botswana Developers Conference, and Artificial Intelligence Conference. It was established to address the absence of a functioning developer community and improve the quality of IT education in the country.

== Innovation competitions ==
Orange Innovation Day, hosted annually by Orange Botswana, brings together technology innovators working on solutions to social challenges and distributes prize funding through two competitions: the Orange Social Venture Prize (OSVP) and the Orange Summer Challenge (OSC). The 2024 edition distributed over P180,000 to winning teams across sectors including mobile services for underserved communities, educational technology, and road safety.

== Sustainable development ==
In 2012, Botswana was one of ten African countries that adopted the Gaborone Declaration for Sustainability in Africa at the Summit for Sustainability in Africa. The signatories recognized that GDP has limitations as a measure of well-being and committed to integrating the value of natural capital into national accounting and corporate planning processes.

Botswana ratified the Paris Agreement on climate change on 11 November 2016. In 2016, the government drafted a Botswana Climate Change Response Policy with support from the United Nations Development Program, proposing a climate-focused research agenda and the establishment of a National Climate Change Unit. A national climate change adaptation plan framework was awaiting formal endorsement in June 2020.

Researchers have been tackling the problem of the invasive water fern Salvinia molesta, which has been threatening the Okavango Delta, a UNESCO World Heritage site and Africa's largest wetland, for the past three decades. Thanks to the introduction of a Salvinia-munching weevil in 2002 as an alternative to chemical pesticides, the invasion was brought under control in 2016. The SADC centre in Gaborone hosts the Regional Early Warning System, Famine Early Warning System, and Climate Services Centre.

Botswana output on invasive species surged from 1 publication in the 2012 to 2015 period to 15 in the 2016 to 2019 period, according to a UNESCO study of 56 research topics related to the Sustainable Development Goals.

== Regional policy framework ==
Botswana is one of only four SADC countries which had ratified the SADC Protocol on Science, Technology and Innovation (2008) by 2015. Ten of the 15 SADC countries must ratify the protocol for it to enter into force. The protocol promotes legal and political cooperation and stresses the importance of science and technology for achieving sustainable and equitable socio-economic growth and poverty eradication.

The Regional Indicative Strategic Development Plan for 2005 to 2020 identifies 12 priority areas for regional intervention. Its STI-related targets included raising gross domestic expenditure on R&D to at least 1 percent of GDP by 2015 and achieving 100 percent connectivity to the regional power grid for all member states by 2012. A 2013 mid-term review noted limited progress toward STI targets, owing to the lack of human and financial resources at the SADC Secretariat. In June 2014, SADC ministers adopted the SADC Regional Strategic Plan on Science, Technology and Innovation for 2015 to 2020 to guide implementation of regional programs.

== See also ==
- BOTSAT-1
- Botswana Digital and Innovation Hub
- Botswana International University of Science and Technology
- Botswana Communications Regulatory Authority
- Botswana Telecommunications Corporation
- Fintech Association of Botswana
- BrainSTREAM Institute of Technology
- Botswana Mobile and Internet Summit
- Economy of Botswana
- Commonwealth Telecommunications Organisation

== Sources ==
This article incorporates text from a free content work. Licensed under CC-BY-SA IGO. 3.0. Text taken from UNESCO Science Report: towards 2030, UNESCO.
