= AVY =

AVY may refer to:

- The National Rail code for Aberdovey railway station, United Kingdom
- The Ticker symbol for Avery Dennison

Avy may refer to:

- An avalanche
- Avy, Charente-Maritime, a commune in France
- an internet slang term for avatar (computing)
- Avy B.V., a Dutch company which develops and operates drones
- Avy AB, a Swedish Proptech company which develops an Tenant Experience Platform
