= Israel Goodovitch =

Israeli architect (1934–2026)

- 'ישראל גודוביץ
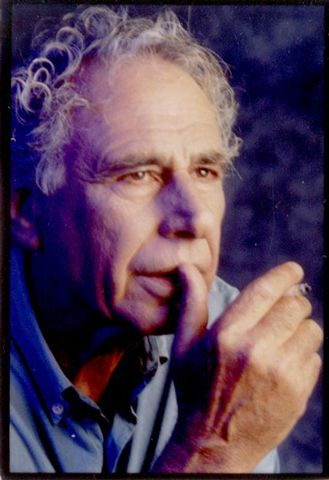
- Goodovitch in 2003
- Born: 1934; Haifa, Mandatory Palestine
- Died: 22 May 2026 (aged 92)
- Known for: Architecture
- Spouse: Ariela
- Children: 2

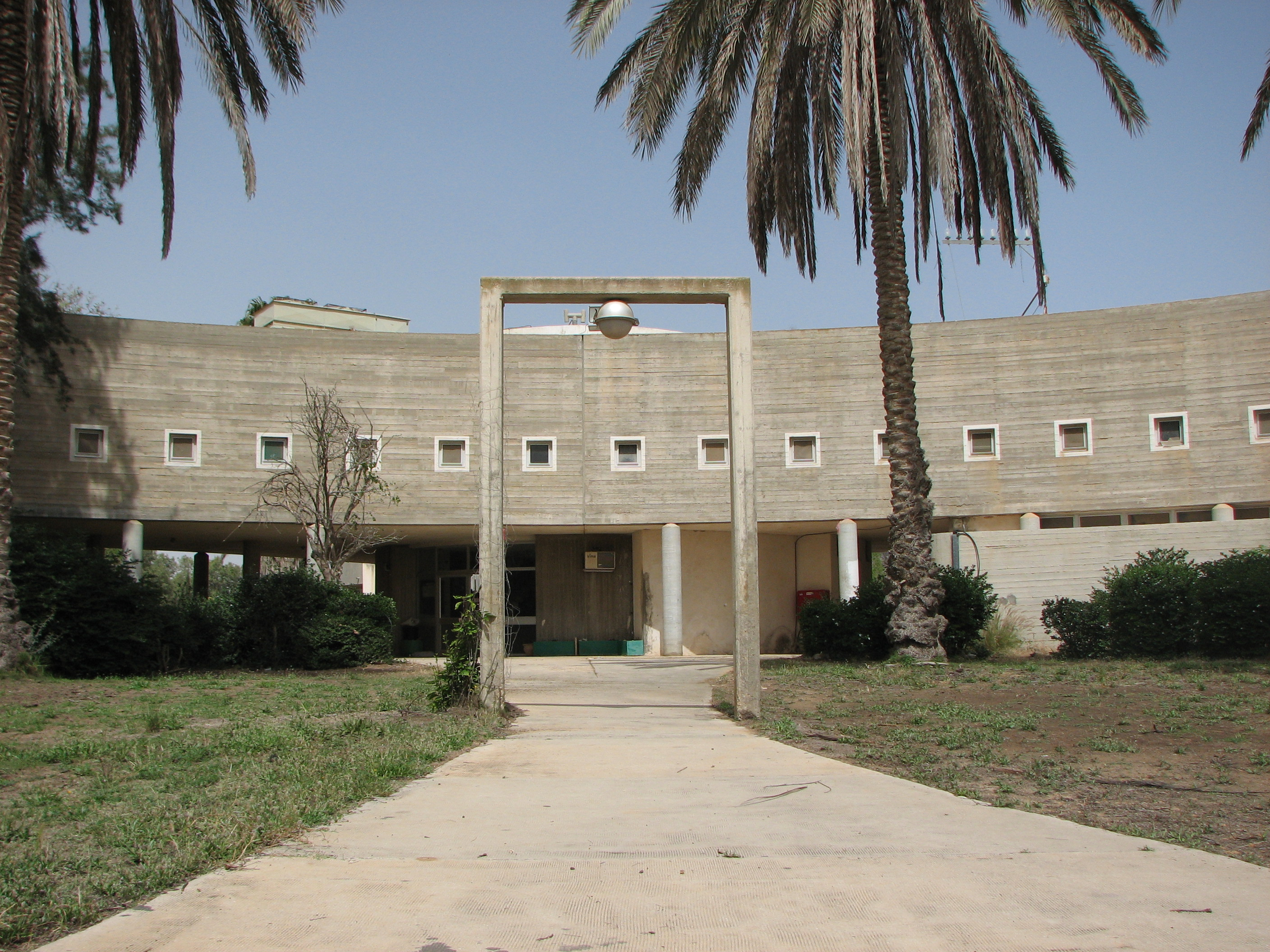
Dining hall, Kibbutz Kerem Shalom

Israel Meir Goodovitch (Hebrew: ישראל מאיר גודוביץ'; 1934 – 22 May 2026) was an Israeli architect and urban designer who created Modernist designs and concepts, but is better known in Israel for his short stint as City Engineer of Tel Aviv-Yafo.

== Early life and education ==
Goodovitch was born in Haifa in 1934, son of Ya’akov and Frida, who was the granddaughter of Rabi Arie Leib Hacohen Popka and the great-granddaughter of Chofetz Chaim, aka Yisrael Meir Kagan. He was born 4 months after the death of Chofetz Chaim, and was named after him. Israel graduated Tichon Hadash high school in Tel Aviv, and studied architecture at the Technion – Israel Institute of Technology.

== Professional career ==
In 1959 Goodovitch received an award from the Israeli Histadrut Fund for Young Creators.

Between the years 1961 and 1963, he was a student of Kenzo Tange in the Department of Architecture of Tokyo University. He joined the group of architects Arata Isozaki and Reiko Tomita and was part of the group that planned the Olympic complex of the 1964 Olympic games in Tokyo. He received a Ph.D. in urban design from the Department of Architecture, Tokyo University in 1963.

In 1964 Goodovitch came back to Israel and served as director of Planning and Design in the Israeli Ministry of Housing.

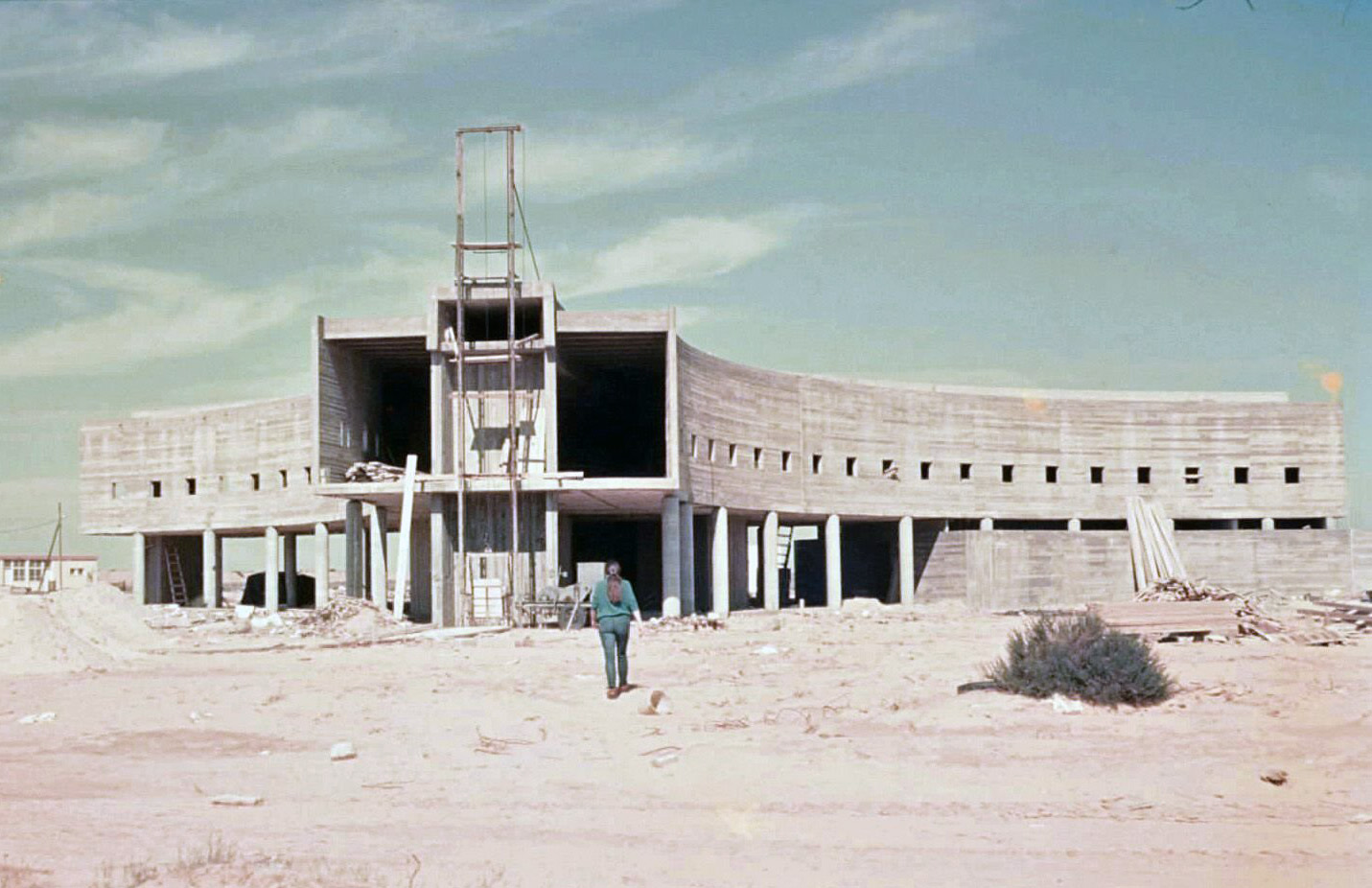
Kerem Shalom, the dining hall under construction, c. 1968

In the 1970s, he designed the unique prefabricated house system with hexagonal elements used for Moshav Hatzeva in the Aravah desert, the Saddle System for reinforced concrete structures of Ashtrom Engineering, Israel. As part of the same project, he designed the nearby Hatzeva Field School of the Society for the Protection of Nature in Israel (SPNI). The SPNI has discontinued its use, signing in 2022 a contract for its repurposing as an eco-art (earth art) center, and offering it in 2023 as shelter for Israeli refugees from the Gaza envelope communities during the Gaza war.

In 1973, Goodovitch joined the Israeli Transportation Highway company, where he served as a consultant advisor until 1975. While in office, Goodovitch planned the memorial to the fallen of the "HaPlada" ('Steel') Division from the Six-Day War, placed in Yamit, Sinai in 1977 and rebuilt near Kerem Shalom in 1982.

Between 1975 and 1998, Goodovitch was the head planner of several projects, including:

- "The Growing House" ("Envelope System"), Or-Yehuda, Israel, 1975–1978.
- Indoor basketball hall, 3,500 seats ("Beit Bendel" building), Zemach, Israel, 1976.
- Olympic Stadium, 60,000 seats, Johannesburg, Pretoria, South Africa, 1983.
- Olympic Stadium, 60,000 seats, Pretoria, South Africa, 1985.
- 10,000 low cost housing units, Johannesburg, Pretoria, South Africa, 1986–1987.
- Holiday Inn Hotel, Tiberias, Israel, 1982–1985.
- "Sonol" Gas station, Shaar Haaliya, Haifa, Israel, 1980.
- "City Tower", High-rise office-building, Tel-Aviv, Israel, 1995.
- New-York Skyscraper - idea project for George Klein Co., N.Y., 1986–1987.
- "Moscow hotel", "Acor group", Paris-Lion-Jerusalem, 1998.

=== Tel Aviv city planner ===
In 1998 Goodovitch joined the Ron Huldai campaign for mayor of Tel Aviv-Yafo. During the campaign period, Goodovitch was the first to coin the term "The Historic City of Tel Aviv-Yafo". After Huldai's victory, Goodovitch was appointed Tel Aviv-Yafo 10th City Engineer.

In March 1999, two months after he was appointed Tel-Aviv City Engineer, Goodovitch manifested his vision to the public, in a presentation called "If you will it… 1999", a paraphrase of Herzl' famous promise. It was there where he coined the phrase "The historical city of Tel Aviv", referring to the borders later acknowledged by UNESCO as "The White City." In that same constitutive event, Goodovitch announced that the vacant area north of the Yarkon River estuary up to Herzliya's border will be declared open for prospect planning and remain a development reserve for future generations.

Goodovitch served in office, defining the future development of Israel's central metropole, until he retired in 2000, at the age of 66. 11 years later, in 2011, Goodovitch issued his grand plan for Tel Aviv - "A city from the Sea". It was a groundbreaking vision, focused on tackling the high density in the central parts of the city, bringing back the view, the breeze, and the sunlight to each and every resident.

In the program, Goodovitch was the first to suggest the shutdown of Sde Dov Airport, and the construction of residential neighborhoods in "Hagush hagadol", north of the Yarkon River, and building an airport on an artificial island, 1.5 km offshore.

He was also one of the first architects to oppose Huldai's plan for a light rail in the Tel Aviv metropolitan area, proposing a much simpler, practical solution - a "Green Ring" of bus lines, circling the center of Tel Aviv.

Tel Aviv shore plan, including an airport 1.5 km offshore

=== Later works ===
In the year 2000 Goodovitch served as chairman of the Israel Institute of Architects & Town Planners. In 2004, he became a special assistant to Zurab Tchiaberashvili, Mayor of Tbilisi.

In 2004, Goodovitch established his private office, "Goodovitch Architects". From 2005 on, Goodovitch was the chairman of "United Architects & Engineers of Israel".

== Personal life and death ==
In the 1950s, Goodovitch married Ariela, a fellow architect and his business partner. The couple had two sons: public transportation expert Tomer Goodovitch, and architect Dekel Goodovitch.

Goodovitch died on 22 May 2026, at the age of 92.

== Publications ==
- "Architecturology"- published by George Allen & Unwin, London, U.K., 1967.
- "Red Tape"- Homage to Prof. N. Parkinson, published by "Mabat" art gallery, Tel-Aviv, 1980.
- "40X40" 40 High-Rises 40 Years, Am Oved Publishers, Tel-Aviv, 2007.

== Gallery ==
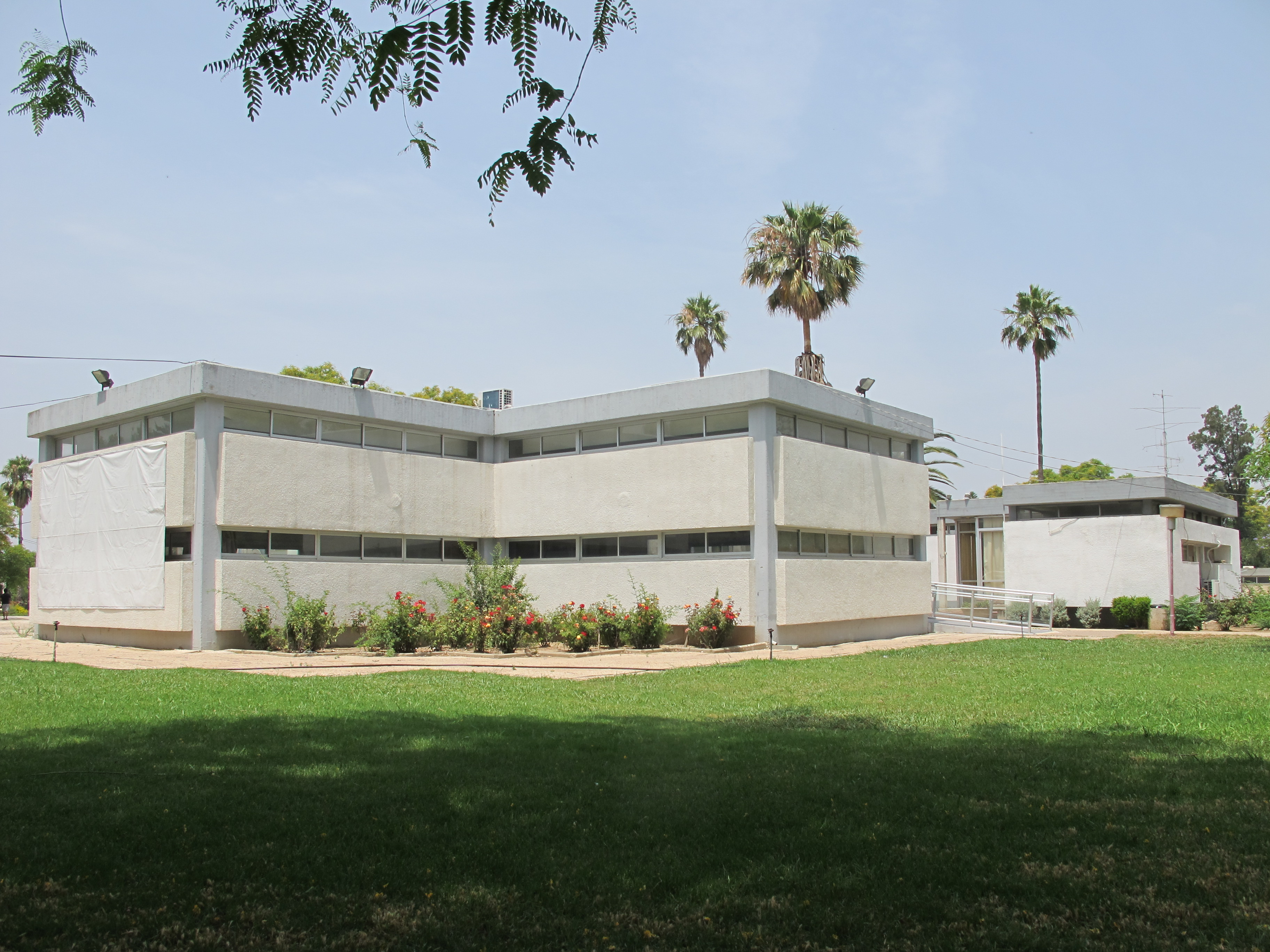
Dining hall and social club in Kibbutz Yad Hana, 1975

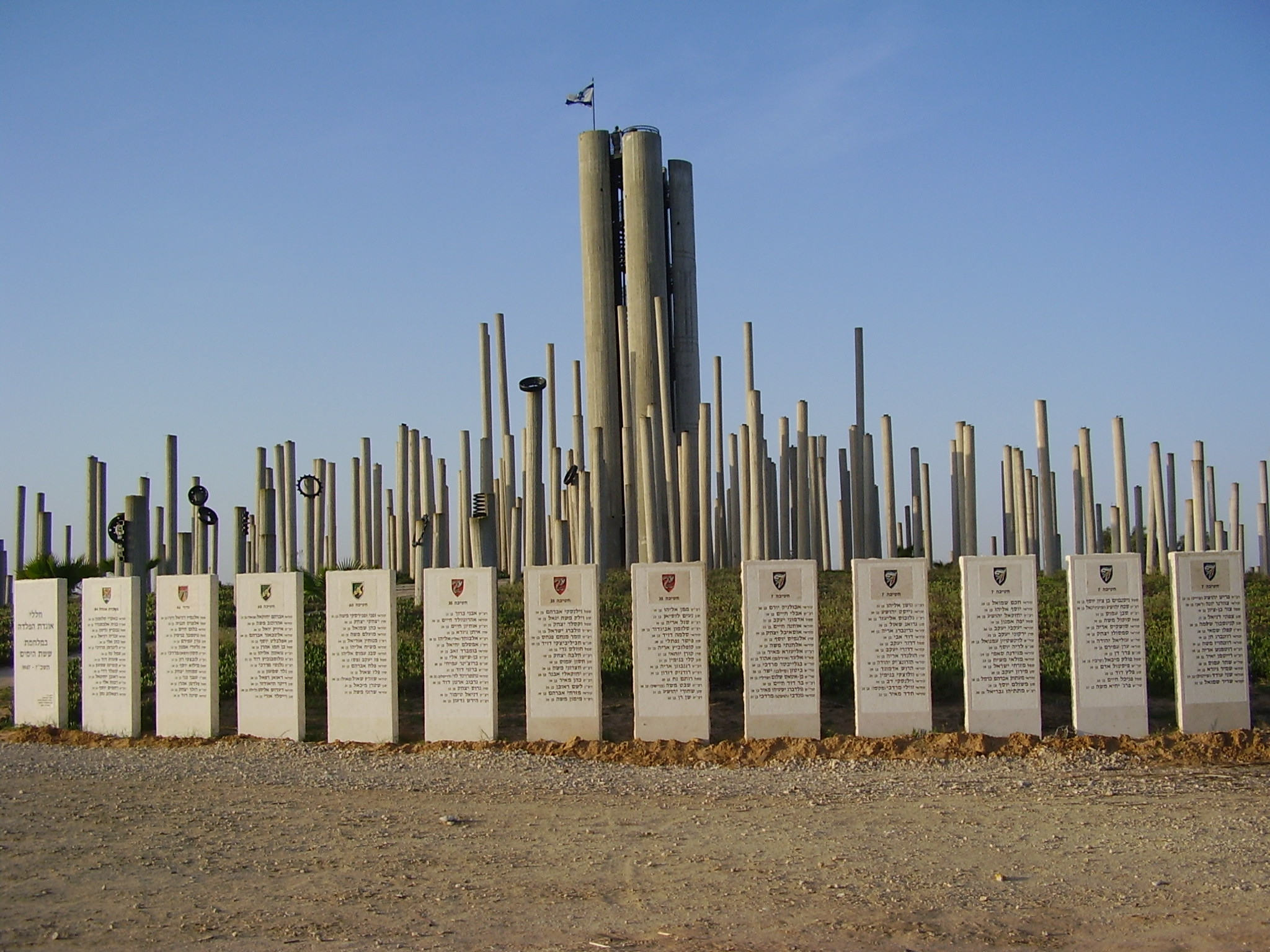
Six-Day War memorial for the fallen of the Division of Steel

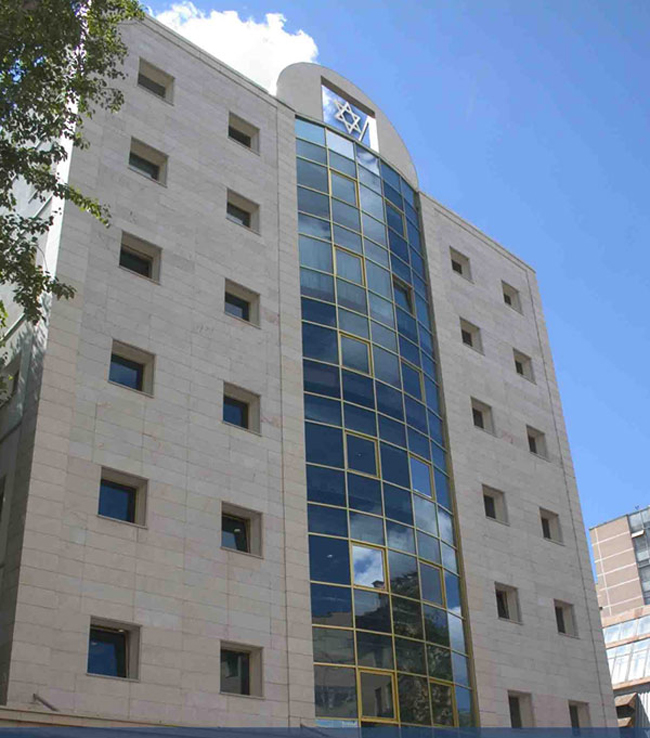
The Jewish Community Center in Moscow

== See also ==
- Architecture in Israel
