= Kerem Shalom =

Kibbutz in southern Israel

Kerem Shalom: כֶּרֶם שָׁלוֹם (Hebrew); كرم أبو سالم (Arabic)
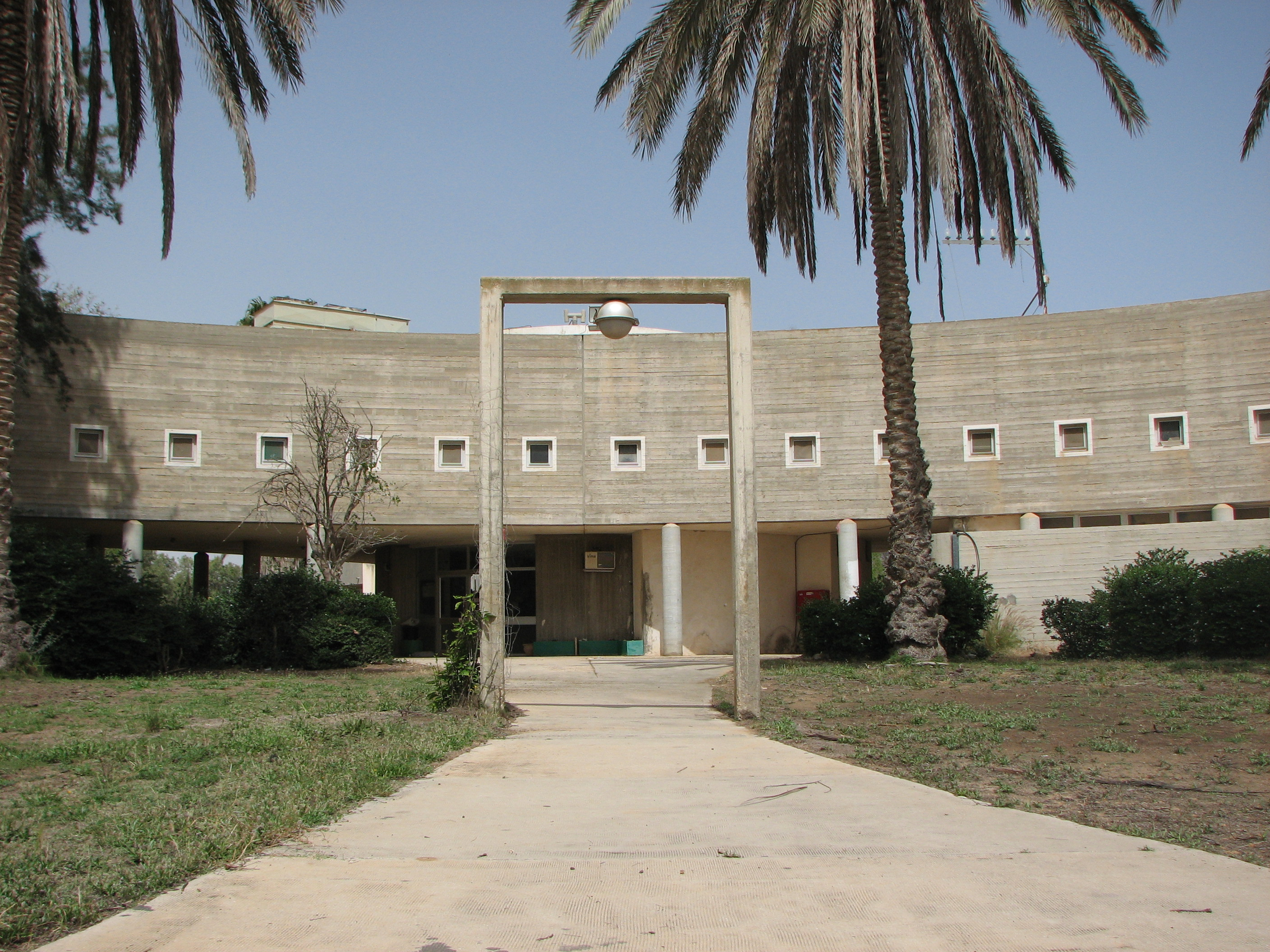
- Dining hall
- Etymology: Vineyard of Peace
- Location within Northwest Negev region of Israel Location within Israel
- Coordinates: 31°13′40″N 34°17′05″E
- Country: Israel
- District: Southern
- Subdistrict: Beersheba
- Council: Eshkol
- Affiliation: Kibbutz Movement
- Founded: 1967 (original); 2001 (re-establishment)
- Founder: Hashomer Hatzair members
- Population (2024): 231

Kerem Shalom (Hebrew: כֶּרֶם שָׁלוֹם, "Vineyard of Peace") is a kibbutz in southern Israel. Located on the triple Gaza Strip-Israel-Egypt border, it falls under the jurisdiction of Eshkol Regional Council. In 2024 it had a population of 231. The kibbutz is located next to the Kerem Shalom border crossing, one of the main points of entry into Gaza.

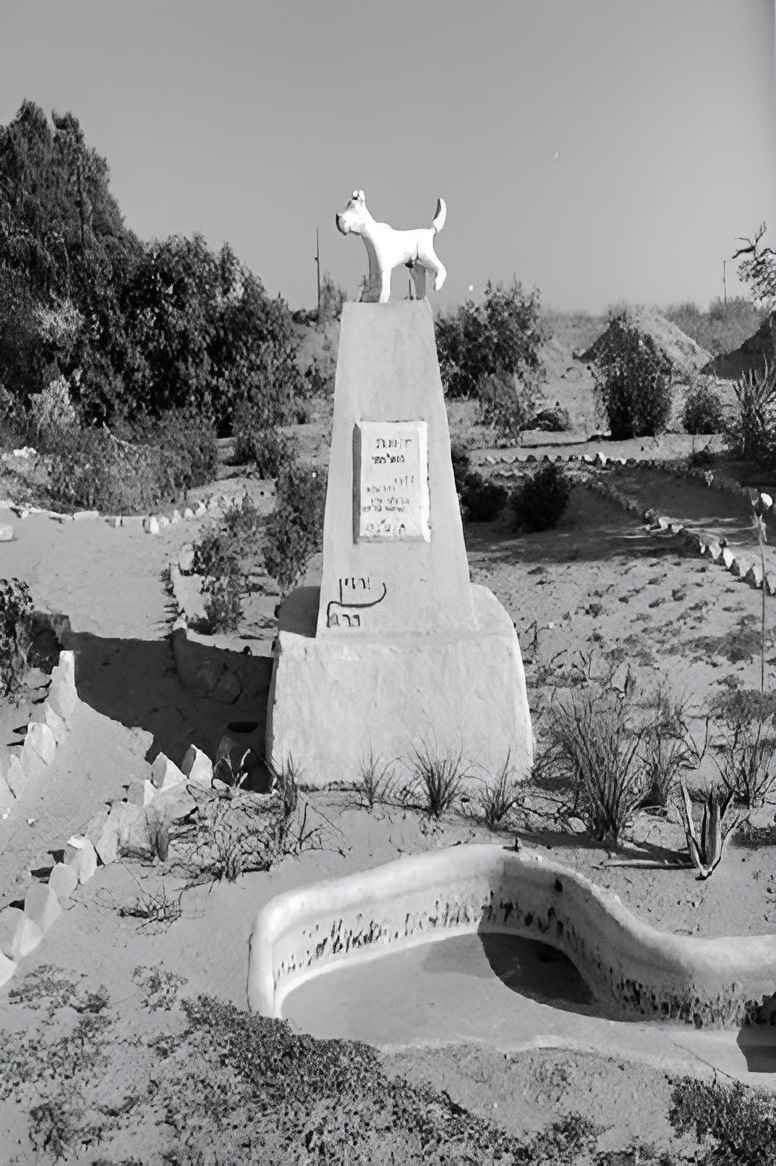
Sculpture in the kibbutz

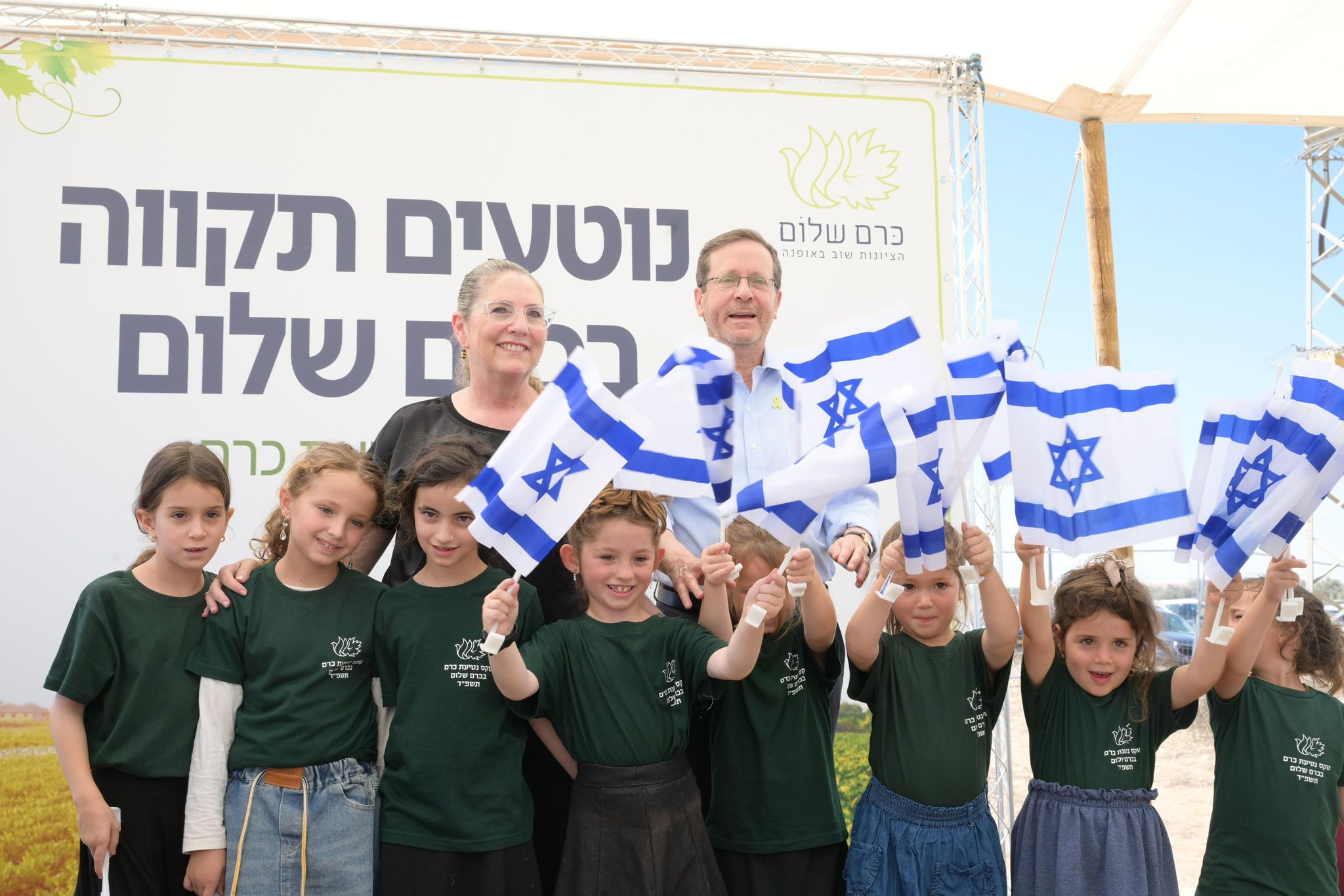
Visit of Issac Herzog, President of Israel, at kibbuz Kerem Shalom planting trees, August 2024

== History ==
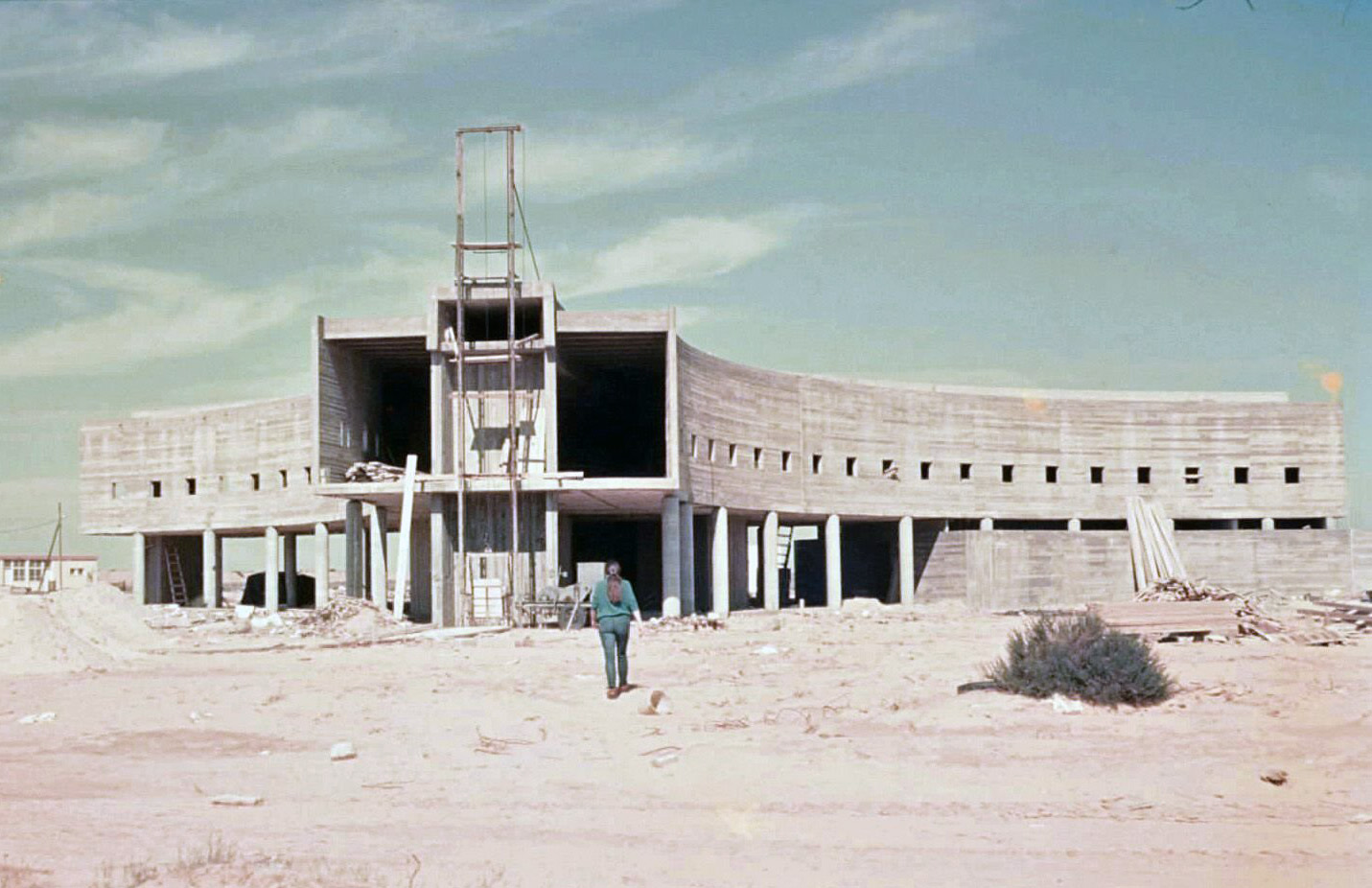
The dining hall under construction; architect Israel Goodovitch, c. 1968

The kibbutz was established in 1967 by members of Hashomer Hatzair, a socialist-Zionist youth movement. The name Kerem Shalom is Hebrew for "Vineyard of Peace." The founders chose this name with the hope that the kibbutz would play a role in establishing peace and ending the Arab–Israeli conflict.

Haaretz described it as "a small community with a communal-secular way of life, which marks holidays and holds culture evenings together and observes total mutual responsibility - in education, culture, health and its economy." According to Ilan Regev, the community manager, "the kibbutz, which was founded in 1967, fell apart in 1995, after members left, but in 2001, it was reestablished."

In 2008, the kibbutz was bombarded by mortar shells. One resident of the kibbutz was quoted as saying "I feel anger because this is our home, and they, the Palestinians, don’t want us to be here." Although a mortar shell hit the electricity infrastructure, several families insisted on celebrating the Passover seder at the kibbutz dining hall.

Eight families joined the kibbutz after the Gaza War of 2008–2009. In 2011, the kibbutz had 35 members and candidates (families and individuals), and about 30 children. The kibbutz started a campaign in 2011 to attract new residents, called "Zionism 2011". Its proximity to both the border of the Gaza Strip and the location where Israeli soldier Gilad Shalit has been abducted had resulted in the kibbutz struggling to increase its membership, according to Regev. He described the kibbutz as "unique in the country in an area that in effect determines the borders of the state, the way it was at the start of Zionism, with an attempt to shape a just and egalitarian society." The Israeli government required the kibbutz to populate at least 40% of the 100 allocated residential slots within a specified time which, according to Regev, required 80 new members.

In March 2006, the bird flu virus was identified in turkey coops in Kerem Shalom.

In 2023, the kibbutz was one of those targeted by Hamas in the October 7 attacks. Kerem Shalom's 10-person civil defense team engaged the attackers, killing at least 20 members of Hamas. Two members of the civil defense team were also killed, and three kibbutz members were injured.

After the attack, for security reasons, half of the residents of Kerem Shalom moved to temporary accommodation in Ashalim, and the rest spread out over the country. During the summer of 2025, they were allowed to gradually move back. By July 2026, it was reported that around 90% of those residents had returned, and an additional six new families had also joined.

== See also ==
- Kerem Shalom border crossing

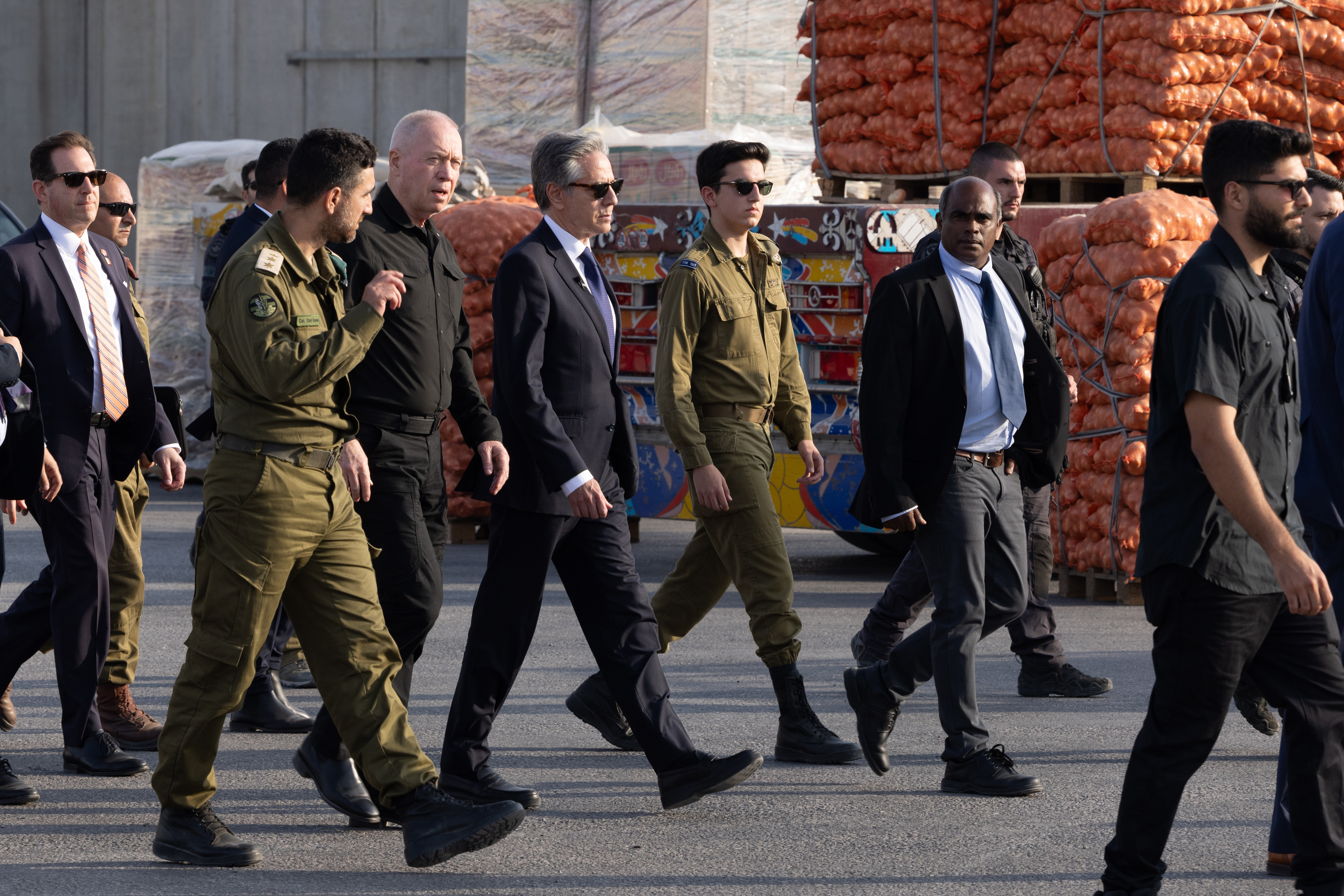
US Foreign Secretary Antony Blinken and Israeli defence minister Yoav Gallant tour the crossing into the Gaza Strip from Israel, 2024
