= Otlogetswe Totolo =

Environmental Scientist/Researcher

Professor Otlogetswe Totolo
- Known for: Environmental research, academic leadership
- Office: Vice Chancellor of Botswana International University of Science and Technology

Academic background
- Education: University of Botswana (BSc); University of Reading (PhD)

Academic work
- Discipline: Environmental science, soil science, GIS
- Institutions: University of Botswana; Botswana International University of Science and Technology

Otlogetswe Totolo is a Motswana Environmental Scientist and academic who is the vice chancellor of the Botswana International University of Science and Technology.

== Education ==
He completed his undergraduate degree at the University of Botswana where he earned BSc (Biology and Environmental Science). He went on to graduate in Msc (Soil Science) in the United Kingdom. He holds a PhD in Soil Science and GIS.

== Career ==
He previously served as Director of Centre for Scientific Research Indigenous Knowledge and Innovation (CesrIKi) He was the Deputy Vice-Chancellor, Dean of the Faculty of Science and Head of Environmental Science and lecturer in Environmental Science at the University of Botswana.

He has also served in various key UB strategic committees such as Council, Senate, Staff Appointments and Promotions Committee, Research Committee.
