= Gaborone Declaration for Sustainability in Africa =

Sustainable-development commitment

The Gaborone Declaration for Sustainability in Africa is a commitment by ten African countries to a multiyear process in favour of sustainable development.

In May 2012, the heads of state of Botswana, Gabon, Ghana, Kenya, Liberia, Mozambique, Namibia, Rwanda, South Africa and the United Republic of Tanzania gathered in Gaborone, the capital of Botswana, for a two-day Summit for Sustainability in Africa, in the company of several public and private partners. At the summit, they adopted the Gaborone Declaration for Sustainability in Africa.

== A multi-year process ==
By adopting the Gaborone Declaration for Sustainability in Africa, these ten countries have engaged in a multi-year process. They have recommitted to implementing all conventions and declarations promoting sustainable development and undertaken to:

- integrate the value of natural capital into national accounting and corporate planning and reporting processes, policies and programmes;
- build social capital and reduce poverty by transitioning agriculture, extractive industries, fisheries and other natural capital uses to practices that promote sustainable employment, food security, sustainable energy and the protection of natural capital through protected areas and other mechanisms; and
- build knowledge, data, capacity and policy networks to promote leadership and a new model of sustainable development and to increase momentum for positive change.

== Beyond GDP ==
The overall objective of the Declaration was ‘to ensure that the contributions of natural capital to sustainable economic growth, maintenance and improvement of social capital and human well-being are quantified and integrated into development and business practice.’ This statement was propelled by the signatories’ realization that GDP has its limitations as a measure of well-being and sustainable growth.

== Follow-up ==
The interim secretariat of this initiative is being hosted by the Department of Environmental Affairs within the Botswanan Ministry of Environment Wildlife and Tourism, with technical support from Conservation International, a non-governmental organization. Conservation International has pledged funding for a situational analysis which will provide baseline information on where the ten countries stand with respect to the agreed actions outlined above and set priorities for moving forward.

Since the 2012 summit, an implementation framework has been drafted to track progress.

=== Gabon ===
In 2012, Gabon adopted Emerging Gabon: Strategic Plan to 2025. The Strategic Plan identifies two parallel challenges: the need to diversify an economy dominated by oil exports (84% in 2012) and the imperative of reducing poverty and fostering equal opportunity. In conformity with the Gaborone Declaration, natural capital is to be integrated into the national accounting system.

The plan also foresees the adoption of a national climate plan to limit Gabon’s greenhouse gas emissions and forge an adaptation strategy, among other moves to foster sustainable development. The National Climate Plan was presented to the president in November 2013 by the National Council on Climate Change, a body created by presidential decree in April 2010.

The government has also created a joint Centre for Environmental Research with the University of Oregon (USA) that will focus on the mitigation of, and adaptation to, climate change and environmental governance, including the development of ecotourism.

The share of hydropower in Gabon’s electricity matrix is to progress from 40% in 2010 to 80% by 2020. In parallel, inefficient thermal power stations are to be replaced with clean ones to bring the share of clean energy to 100%. By 2030, Gabon plans to export 3 000 MW of hydropower to its neighbours. Efforts will also be made to improve energy efficiency and reduce pollution in such areas as construction and transportation.

This new paradigm is to be ensconced in a law on sustainable development which will create a fund compensating the negative effects of development. This law was adopted in August 2014. The law has raised some concerns in civil society as to whether it will protect the territorial rights of third parties, particularly those of local and indigenous communities.

The three pillars of Emerging Gabon: Strategic Plan to 2025 are:

- Green Gabon: to develop the country’s natural resources in a sustainable manner, beginning with an inventory of 22 million ha of forest (85% of the land cover), 1 million ha
- of arable land, 13 national parks and 800 km of coastline;
- Industry Gabon: to develop local processing of raw materials and the export of high value-added products;
- Services Gabon: to foster quality education and training, in order to turn Gabon into a regional leader in financial services, information and communication technologies, green growth, tertiary education and health.

In order to adapt university curricula to market needs, existing universities will be modernized and a Cité verte de l’éducation et du savoir (Green City of Education and Knowledge) will be created in the heart of the country in Booué. Constructed using green materials and running on green energy, this complex will group a campus, research centres and modern housing. Foreign universities will be encouraged to set up campuses on site.

=== Botswana ===
It was Botswana which hosted the Summit for Sustainability in Africa in 2012.

In 2013, Botswana initiated the development of a National Climate Change Strategy and Action Plan. A climate change policy will be developed first, followed by the strategy. The process has reportedly been highly consultative, with the participation of rural inhabitants.

Botswana ratified the Paris Agreement on climate change on 11 November 2016.

== Sources ==
This article incorporates text from a free content work. Licensed under CC BY SA, IGO 3.0. Text taken from UNESCO Science Report: towards 2030, Box 20.1, p.540, UNESCO.
