= Avy B.V. =

Dutch UAV manufacturer

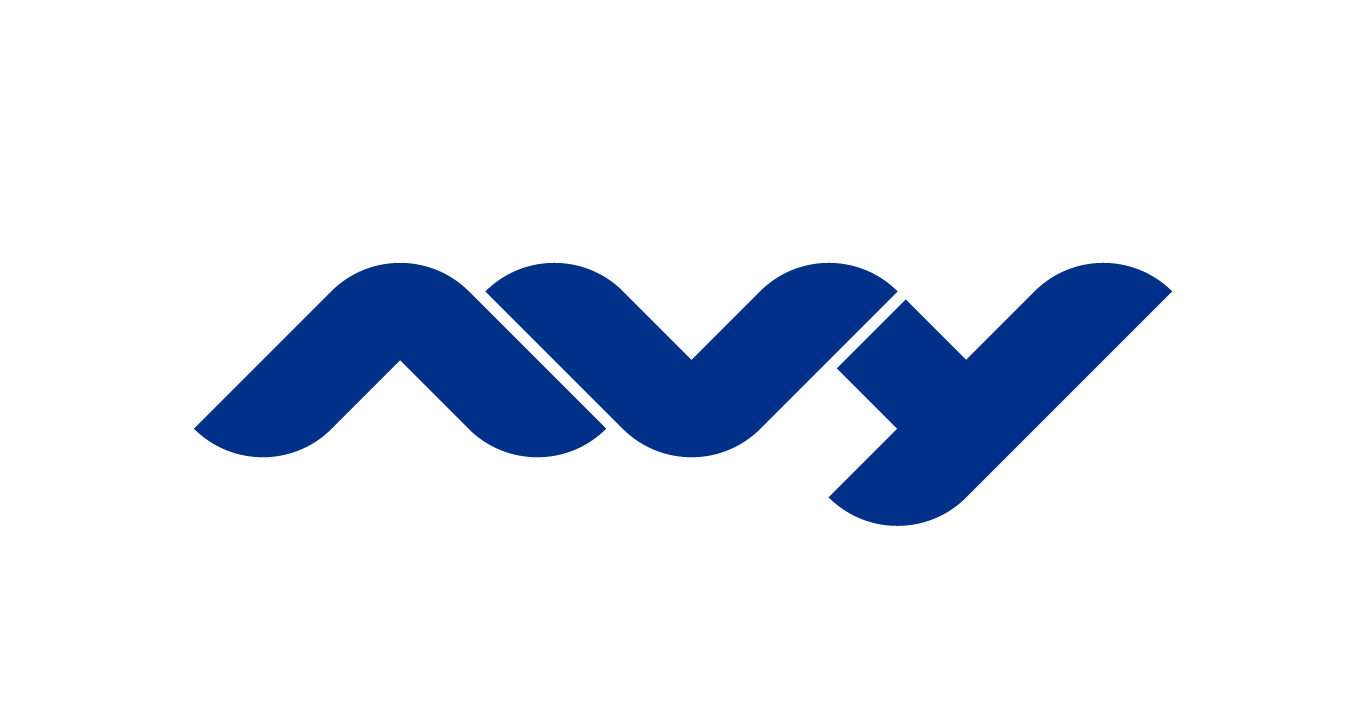
- Industry: Aviation; Logistics; Emergency Response
- Founded: 2016; 10 years ago
- Founder: Patrique Zaman
- Area served: Europe, Africa
- Products: Avy Aera
- Number of employees: 25 - 50
- Website: avy.eu

Avy B.V. is a Dutch technology company that develops and operates drones and aerial networks for long-range missions. Avy's B.V.'s drones can take off and land vertically like a helicopter and fly longer distances than a quadcopter because of their fixed-wing configuration. Its second drone, the Avy Aera, is a VTOL fixed-wing drone and was released at Amsterdam Drone Week in 2019 (Dec 4th - 6th).

== History ==
Avy B.V. was founded in 2016 by Patrique Zaman in Amsterdam, Netherlands

- 2015–2017: European Space Agency (ESA) Incubator
- 2017: UAE Drones For Good Award. Avy in Dubai as one of the ten finalists.
- 2017: Avy exhibited in the Stedelijk Museum as part of the Design for Refugees exhibition.
- 2017: First BVLOS missions in three national parks in South Africa (Hluhluwe, Adventures with elephants, Leshiba)
- 2018: Move to new HQ in Amsterdam.
- 2018: Seed investment from Orange Wings.
- 2019: Release of the Avy Aera at Amsterdam Drone Week.
- 2019: Foundation Medical Drone Service consortium.
- 2020: Avy receives 1.4 million euros in subsidy grant from EU horizon 2020.
- 2020: Avy takes part in Lake Kivu challenge, a VTOL drone competition hosted by African Drone Forum in Rwanda. The company competed in the "Emergency Delivery category" and won a safety award.
- 2020: The company wins a Blue Tulip Award in the category of "Best Mobility Innovation".
- 2021: Launch "Drones for health" project in partnership with Botswana International University of Science and Technology (BIUST), United Nations Population Fund (UNFPA) and the Botswana Ministry of Health and Wellness.
- 2021: Won an Airwards in the "Emergency Response and SAR" category.

== Products ==
=== Avy Aera ===
Avy Aera was launched on Dec 4th, 2019 at the Amsterdam Drone Week in the RAI. Aera has an external dimension of 2400mm x 1300mm X 500mm, and carries a maximum payload of up to 1.5 kg. A VTOL drone is a combination between a helicopter and a plane, as it can take-off and land vertically. It has wings to enlarge the flight endurance. This drone can cover up to 85 km and has one hour of flight time.

The long-range drone can fly beyond visual line-of-sight (BVLOS) missions, and it has a modular payload, making it suitable for different applications. It can be equipped with a stabilized gimbal that has RGB and a thermal camera for wildfire detection and monitoring. For medical deliveries, this model can transport a medical (cooled) cargo box, which is able to keep medical commodities such as blood, samples and vaccines in a temperature controlled state between 2-8 °C. Avy Area is certified to fly BVLOS in compliance with the new EU drone regulations.

=== Docking station ===
The Avy Aera can be remotely and autonomously operated from the docking station, a locally placed and secured drone station where the drone can autonomously take off and land for check and charge. The drone and the station are connected through software and are remotely operated from the network control center. This center can be separate or integrated inside the control room of emergency services. This whole system forms the infrastructure for an aerial drone network.

== Projects ==
=== Healthcare Logistics ===
The Medical Drones Service consortium was launched in late 2019. This consists of ANWB MAA (flights operator), PostNL (logistic provider), Erasmus MC (hospital), Isala (hospitals), Sanquin (blood bank), KPN (telecom), Certe (Lab), and Avy, that collaboratively joined a three year pilot to research and test how drones can contribute to deliver healthcare in the Netherlands and keep healthcare accessible in the future. The medical partners are important to develop the right kind of emergency service. Avy and KPN are the two technology partners. Halfway through the project, the first BVLOS flights have been performed by the ANWB MAA on different routes between hospitals & blood bank in the Netherlands.

=== Emergency Services ===
With climate change, rapid detection of wildfires becomes important with the increasing risk of wildfires. Avy partnered up with CHC Helicopters and Safety Region of North Holland to research the use of drones for detection of early-stage wildfires. In February 2021, the Avy Area (equipped with a stabilized gimbal camera with RGB and thermal functionality) performed several test flights in National Park the Hoge Veluwe for the Security Regions VNOG and Gelderland Midden. In September 2021 phase 2 & 3 of this project will start with more test flights above the Veluwe.

=== Last-mile Medical Delivery ===
In April 2021, Avy partnered with the Botswana International University of Science and Technology (BIUST), UNFPA and Botswana Ministry of Health and Wellness to start the Drones for Health project. This aims to reduce the numbers of maternal deaths by using drones to deliver health supplies and emergency commodities. The Avy Aera was 65% faster than common road transport to reach certain communities. The Drones for Health project was officially launched on May 7, 2021 as it was initiated by BIUST, UNFPA, and the Ministry of Health & Wellness of Botswana.

== Drone Specifications ==
=== Avy Aera ===
Dimensions:

- Wingspan: 2400mm
- Length: 1300mm
- Height: 500mm
- Transport case: 2000 x 600 x 600mm
- Weight: 12 kg

Payloads:

- Maximum payload weight: 1.5 kg
- Payload volume: 200 x 275 x 135mm (L x W x H)
- Cargo module: Default
- Medical payload: Insulated for cooled transport
- First response payload: Nighthawk 2

Flight Performance:

- Flight time: 55 minutes
- Range: 60 km
- Cruise speed: 40 kt (74 km/h)

== Awards ==
In 2020, Avy won a Blue Tulip Award (organized by Accenture) for Best Mobility Innovation category. In 2021, the company in partnership with the Dutch fire brigade won an Airwards, the global award to recognize positive drone use cases, in the "Emergency Response and SAR" category. The project aims to build early wildfire warning systems with daily drone flights.
