= Mineirinho =

Indoor sporting arena in Belo Horizonte, Brazil

Mineirinho Arena
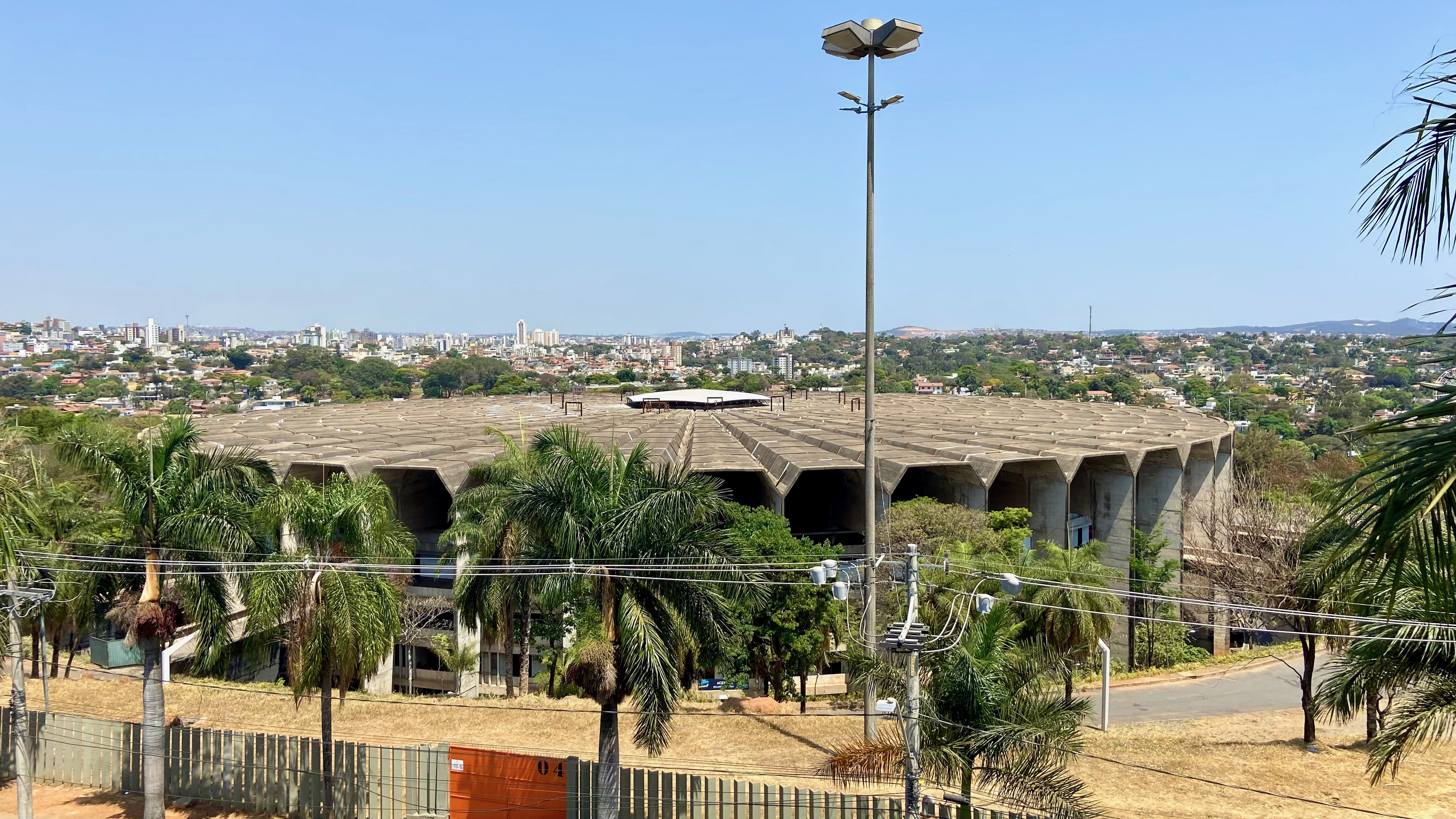
- Mineirinho in 2024
- Interactive map of Mineirinho Arena
- Full name: Estádio Jornalista Felipe Drummond
- Location: Belo Horizonte, MG, Brazil
- Coordinates: 19°51′43″S 43°58′21″W
- Owner: Minas Gerais state government
- Capacity: 25,000

Construction
- Groundbreaking: 1973
- Opened: 1980
- Main contractor: ADEMG

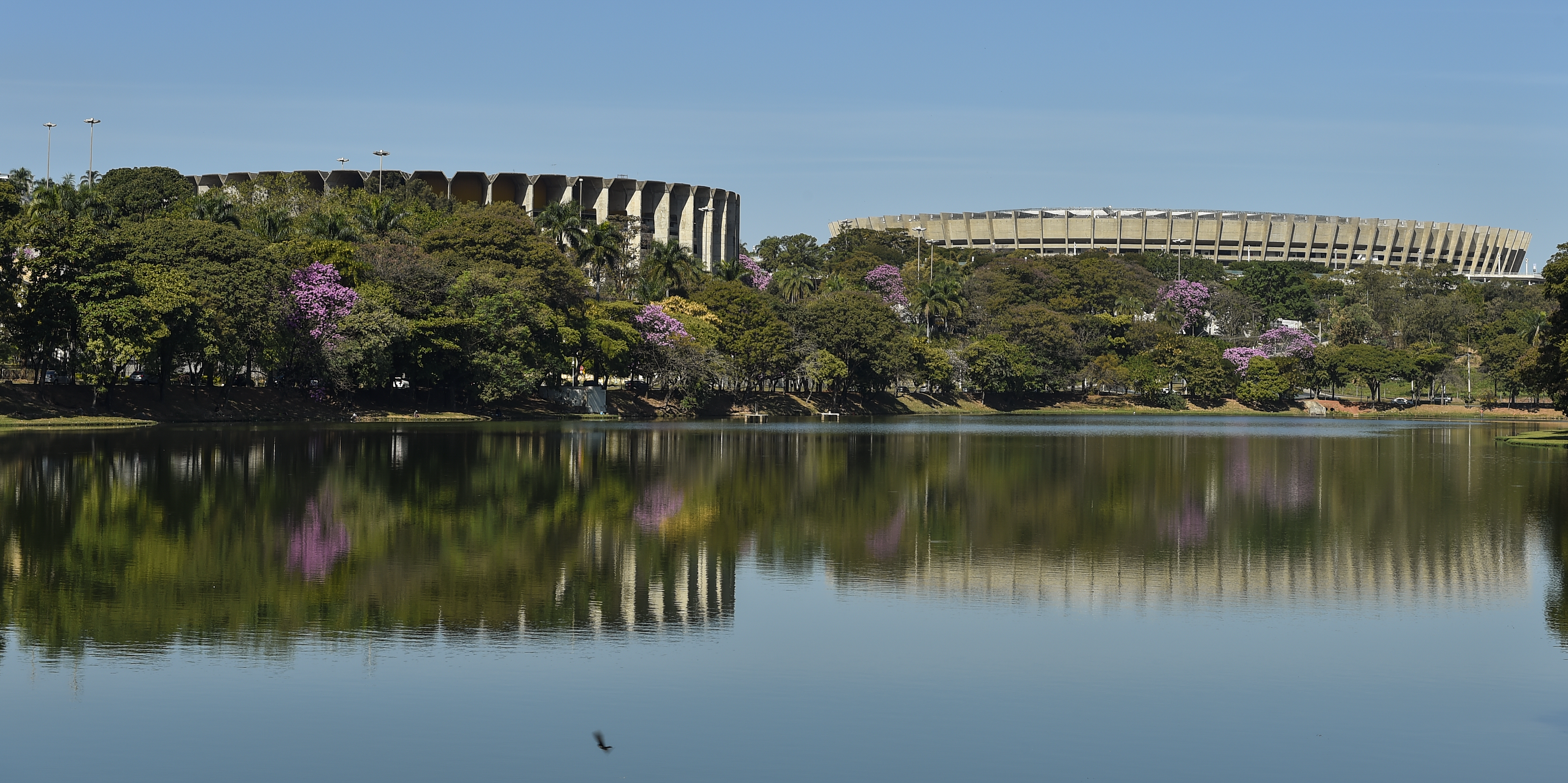
The indoor arena (left) next to Mineirão Stadium in 2018.

Mineirinho Arena (officially Estádio Jornalista Felipe Drummond), sometimes called just Mineirinho, is the biggest indoor sporting arena in Brazil. Located in Belo Horizonte, Brazil, the arena holds 25,000 people.

Mineirinho is located in the Sports Complex of Mineirão Stadium in the Pampulha, which was one of the headquarters of the 2013 FIFA Confederations Cup and the 2014 FIFA World Cup. The nickname (small Mineiro) is due to being located close to the larger Mineirão (big Mineiro), the stadium.

At the time of its construction, the now extinct ADEMG (Administração de Estádios do Estado de Minas Gerais), the organization responsible for building the arena, was administered by sportswriters, who decided to honor Felipe Drummond, one of the most important sportswriters in the history of Minas Gerais, for his work as a journalist.

== Events ==
The Mineirinho Arena is used mainly for volleyball but also hosts an eclectic variety of national and international events, all indoor. The venue is also used for basketball, concerts, indoor football and mixed martial arts.

=== Sport ===
Through its history, the arena has hosted many sporting events, including volleyball and UFC. 2014 FIVB Volleyball Men's Club World Championship was held at the arena.

=== Concerts ===
Mineirinho also hosts concerts. Brazilian musicians such as Rita Lee, Xuxa, Roberto Carlos and Sepultura have played at the venue. Notable past international performers include Guns N' Roses, Emerson, Lake & Palmer, Ozzy Osbourne, Iron Maiden, Scorpions, Chicago, RBD, Ne-Yo, and Rihanna. On October 11, 1990, the British rock musician Eric Clapton played a sold out show at the venue, selling a total of 25,000 concert tickets for the event during his Journeyman World Tour.

== See also ==
- List of indoor arenas by capacity
- List of indoor arenas in Brazil
- Mineirão Stadium
