= Estádio Orlando Scarpelli =

Football stadium in Florianópolis, Santa Catarina, Brazil

- Scarpelli
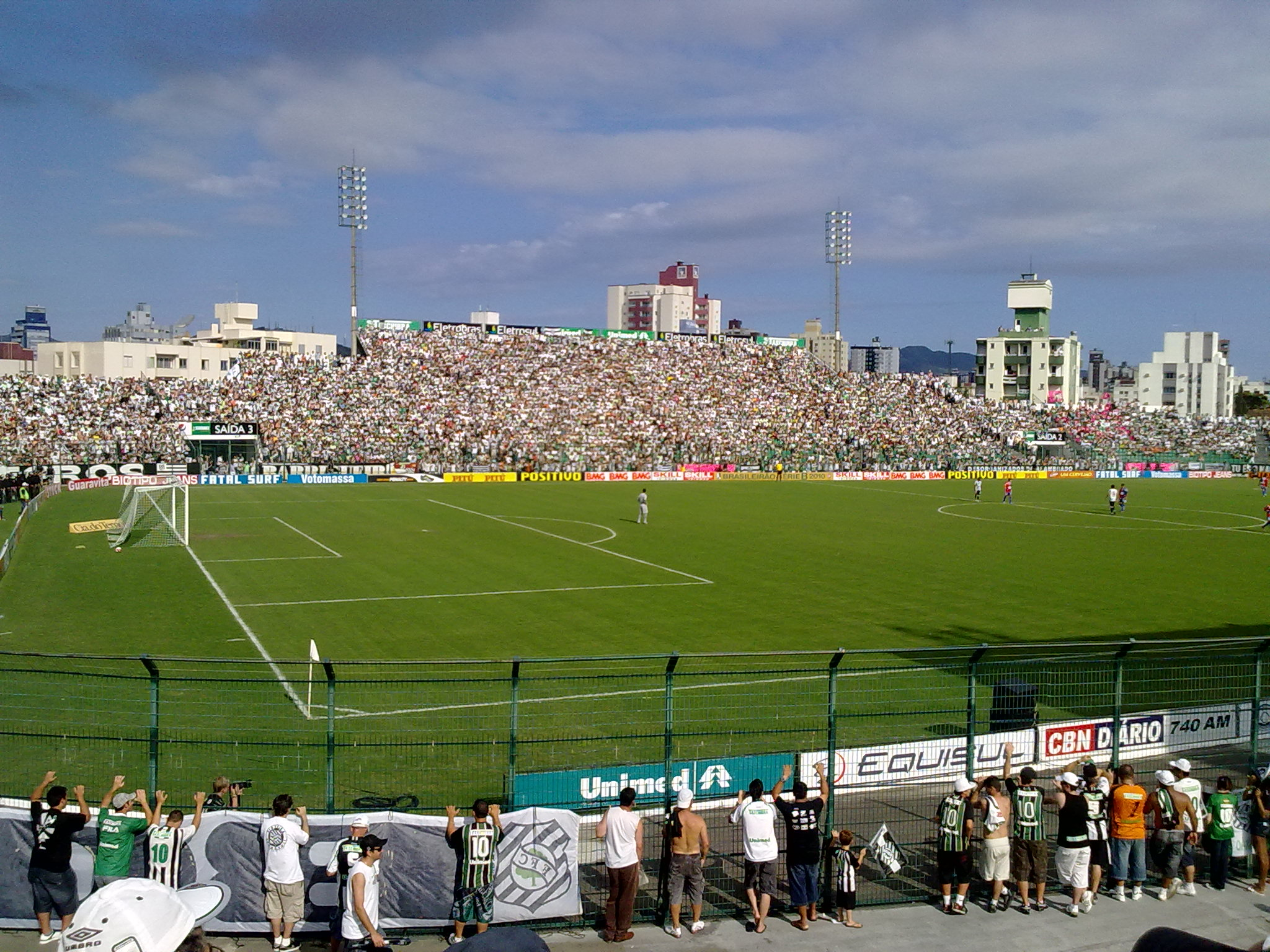
- Sisbrace
- Interactive map of Estádio Orlando Scarpelli
- Full name: Estádio Orlando Scarpelli
- Location: Florianópolis, Santa Catarina, Brazil
- Coordinates: 27°35′08″S 48°35′12″W
- Owner: Figueirense FC
- Capacity: 19,584
- Surface: Grass
- Record attendance: 32.800
- Field size: 105 x 68m

Construction
- Groundbreaking: 1948
- Built: 1960
- Opened: June 12, 1960
- Renovated: 1979, 2005, 2016
- Expanded: 1972

Tenant
- Figueirense

The Estádio Orlando Scarpelli, usually called Scarpelli, is a football stadium inaugurated on June 12, 1960 in Estreito neighborhood, Florianópolis, Santa Catarina, with a maximum capacity of 19,584 spectators. The stadium is owned by Figueirense FC, and its formal name honors Orlando Scarpelli, who was Figueirense's president, and donated the groundplot where the stadium was built.

Its inauguration took place on June 12, 1960, during a friendly match between Figueirense and Clube Atlético Catarinense. The match ended in a 1–1 draw, and the stadium’s first goal was scored by Emídio Silva, a player for Figueirense.

The largest attendance ever recorded at the stadium occurred during a match of the 1975 Campeonato Brasileiro Série A, when 32,800 spectators watched the game between Figueirense and CR Vasco da Gama. This also remains the highest attendance ever recorded for a football match in the state of Santa Catarina.

The stadium has hosted at least four matches of the Brazil national football team, most notably the 2000 match against the Chile national football team, which drew a crowd of 31,098 spectators.

== History ==
In September 1948, the stadium construction commenced.

The inaugural match was played on June 12, 1960, with a draw between Figueirense and Atlético Catarinense. The first goal of the stadium was scored by Figueirense's Emídio Silva.

On August 15, 1973, was played the reinaugural match between Figueirense and Vitória. Shortly before that, the metallic bleachers, the lighting system, the dressing rooms and the field were completed.

In 2000, the Coloninha section (bleachers where the supporters have to stand up, usually known in Brazil as gerais, meaning generals, or commons) of the stadium was replaced by a more comfortable one. In the same year, the wire fence around the bleachers were built.

In 2002, the new lighting system, as well as the press cabins, were built.

In 2005, Orlando Scarpelli became an all-seater stadium.

== Concerts ==
- Eric Clapton at the venue on October 14, 1990 during his Journeyman World Tour.
- Shakira performed at the stadium on December 10, 1996 during her Tour Pies Descalzos.
- The Black Eyed Peas performed in here on November 1, 2010 during The E.N.D. World Tour.
