= BOTSAT‑1 =

Earth observation satellite

BOTSAT-1
- Mission type: Earth observation technology demonstrator
- Operator: Botswana International University of Science and Technology

Spacecraft properties
- Manufacturer: Botswana International University of Science and Technology; EnduroSat

Start of mission
- Launch date: 4 March 2024
- Rocket: Falcon 9 (Transporter-10)
- Launch site: Vandenberg Space Force Base

Orbital parameters
- Reference system: Geocentric orbit
- Regime: Low Earth orbit

BOTSAT-1 (Botswana Satellite 1) is the first satellite developed and operated by Botswana. It was launched on 15 March 2025 aboard a SpaceX Falcon 9 rocket as part of the Transporter-13 rideshare mission from Vandenberg Space Force Base in California. BOTSAT-1 is a 3U CubeSat built by Bulgarian satellite manufacturer EnduroSat in collaboration with engineers from the Botswana International University of Science and Technology (BIUST). It carries a hyperspectral imaging payload and supports applications in agriculture, environmental monitoring, mineral mapping, and urban planning. Its launch brought Africa's total satellite count to 65.

== Background ==
The BOTSAT programme began taking shape around 2020, in the absence of a formal Botswana space agency or national space policy. BIUST took on the role that a space agency would normally play, with backing from the Ministry of Communications and Innovation and the Ministry of Higher Education. The project was led by Dr Dimane Mpoeleng and involved approximately 80 volunteers, including 10 postgraduate students working on satellite data applications. BIUST engineers participated in the Assembly, Integration and Testing (AIT) phase at EnduroSat's facilities in Sofia, Bulgaria, with the AIT phase completing in September 2024.

== Technical specifications ==
BOTSAT-1 uses EnduroSat's 3U CubeSat platform, which has a software-defined architecture allowing updates to be applied after launch through EnduroSat's SpaceOps software. The primary payload is the Mantis Hyperspectral Imager, manufactured by South African company Dragonfly Aerospace, which provides an approximate spatial resolution of 12 meters and a swath width of about 32 kilometers. The satellite completes around six orbital passes over Botswana per day. It transmits data to BIUST's ground station in Palapye, which was upgraded to X-band capability at a cost of approximately US$200,000 to allow faster image downloads.

== Launch ==
BOTSAT-1 launched at 06:39 GMT on 15 March 2025 from Space Launch Complex 4E (SLC-4E) at Vandenberg Space Force Base. The Transporter-13 rideshare mission placed 74 satellites into orbit in a single flight. Botswana's President Duma Boko attended the launch as part of a working visit to the United States, accompanied by BIUST Vice Chancellor Professor Otlogetswe Totolo and senior government officials. During the visit, the President also toured SpaceX's rocket production and Starlink Mini production facilities. The first signal received from BOTSAT-1 after deployment was a transmission of the Botswana national anthem in Setswana. A school outreach programme run around the same time brought 350 students from 34 senior secondary schools to participate in satellite tracking and simulation activities.

== Applications ==
BOTSAT-1's hyperspectral imaging capability supports the following national development priorities:

- Precision agriculture: soil health analysis and crop monitoring
- Mineral mapping: ground composition data for the mining sector
- Environmental monitoring: habitat tracking, deforestation detection, and climate change indicators
- Disaster management: early warning support for floods, droughts, and wildfires
- Urban planning: geospatial data for infrastructure development

== Significance ==
Africa Defense Forum described BOTSAT-1 as a model for developing countries seeking a space presence, noting that the project was led primarily by volunteers at a total cost of US$2.19 million, and that it was completed without a formal space agency. Dragonfly Aerospace described the mission as setting a precedent for future African-led satellite initiatives demonstrating the value of partnerships between universities and private companies.

== BOTSAT-2 ==
Following BOTSAT-1, the Botswana government confirmed plans for a second satellite, BOTSAT-2, led by BIUST and supported by the Botswana Institute for Technology Research and Innovation (BITRI). BOTSAT-2 is intended to offer more advanced Earth observation capabilities in agriculture, water resource management, and climate monitoring.
