= Marina Cunin =

American social anthropologist

Marina Cunin is an American social-anthropologist.

Her research topics have included Japanese students' perceptions of university (Student Views in Japan: Fieldwork Publications, 2004), experiences of international students in Japan and return migration to Trinidad and Tobago.
