= Zemach =

Zemach (Hebrew: צמח) is a Hebrew word signifying 'branch', 'sprout' or 'shoot', metaphorically also growth, a new start, future hope, and biblically - the coming of the Messiah. It can occur as a surname. Spelling variations include Tsemach, Tzemach, Tsemah, Zemah, etc.

== Places ==
- Tsemah Junction, major road junction near the site of former Arab village of Samakh in Mandatory Palestine
- Tzemach regional center developing around the junction, with Kinneret College, Beit Gabriel Cultural Center, the Emek HaYarden Regional Council offices, a shopping centre, an industrial area, etc.

== People ==
=== Given name ===
- Tsemach Benveniste, Hebrew name of Francisco Mendes, husband of Gracia Mendes Nasi (1510 – 1569)
- Zemach Shabad (1864-1935), Jewish physician and social and political activist
- Zemah ben Hayyim, Gaon of Sura from 889 to 895
- Zemah ben Paltoi (died 890), Gaon at Academy at Pumbeditha
- Tzemach Dawid (1541–1613), Jewish chronicler, mathematician, historian, astronomer and astrologer
- Tzemach Cunin (1976–2019), American rabbi, and the founder of the Chabad of Century City in Los Angeles, California

=== Surname ===
- Roy Zemach (b. 1973), Israeli poet
- Eddy Zemach (1935–2021), Israeli philosopher
- Margot Zemach (1931–1989), American illustrator
- Nahum Zemach (1887–1939), Jewish stage actor and director, founder of Habima Theatre
- Rita Zemach (1926–2015), American statistician
- Shlomo Zemach (1886–1974), Israeli author, agriculturalist, and Zionist pioneer
- Jacob ben Hayyim Zemah (17th century), Portuguese kabalist and physician

=== People known as "Tzemach" ===
- Tzemach Tzedek (1789–1866), Menachem Mendel Schneersohn, more commonly known by the name of one of his published works, Tzemach Tzedek

== Physics ==
- Zemach radius of the proton
