= Kunin (surname) =

Kunin, feminine: Kunina is a Slavic surname. Notable people with this surname include:

- Drew Kunin, sound mixer
- Julia Kunin, American sculpture and video artist
- Luke Kunin (born 1997), American ice hockey player
- Madeleine M. Kunin, American diplomat, author, and politician
- Myron Kunin (1928 - 2013), American businessman and art collector
- Vitaly Kunin (born 1983) is a German chess player
- Vladimir Kunin, Russian writer, playwright and screenwriter
