= Tzemach Cunin =

American rabbi (1976–2019)

Tzemach Yehoshua Cunin
- Born: March 27, 1976; Los Angeles County, California
- Died: July 5, 2019 (aged 43); Los Angeles, California, U.S.
- Occupation: Rabbi
- Spouse: Ada Wilschanski (m. 2000)
- Children: 5
- Parent(s): Shlomo Cunin, Miriam Cunin

Tzemach Yehoshua Cunin (March 27, 1976 – July 5, 2019) was an American rabbi and the founder of the Chabad of Century City in Los Angeles, California, United States.

== Life ==
Cunin was born on March 27, 1976, to Shlomo Cunin, the director of Chabad-Lubavitch of California.

Cunin assisted his father in his ongoing effort to repatriate the Schneerson Library from Russia to the United States beginning when he was a teenager and continuing into adulthood. In 1990, Cunin founded the Chabad of Century City in Los Angeles. He also founded Beis Chaya Mushka, an all-girl school in Los Angeles.

Cunin married Ada Wilschanski in 2000; they had five children. He died on July 5, 2019, at 43.
