= Shlomo Cunin =

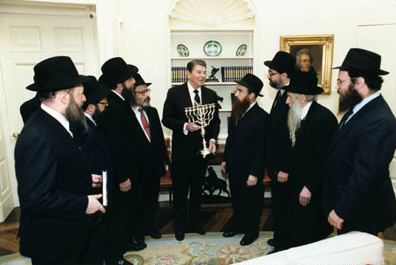
Rabbi Cunin, third (visible) on left, with a delegation representing the "American Friends of Lubavitch", presents a menorah to president Ronald Reagan, White House, 1984.

Rabbi Baruch Shlomo Eliyahu Cunin (Hebrew ברוך שלמה אליהו קונין) (Shlomo Cunin) is a Hasidic Rabbi, associated with the Chabad-Lubavitch movement. Cunin is the director of Chabad-Lubavitch of California, and Chabad activities on the West Coast of the United States.

== Activities ==
In 1965, he was appointed by the Lubavitcher Rebbe, Rabbi Menachem Mendel Schneerson, as a head shaliach to the West Coast of the United States. Cunin built one of the first of over 5,000 Chabad houses worldwide. Under his guidance Cunin has a network of over 200 Chabad Houses throughout California and Nevada.

Chabad of California's mission is to reach out to others with acts of goodness and kindness. West Coast Chabad is a community-based nonprofit organization whose efforts are rooted in traditional Jewish values—and many of its programs help the needy regardless of background or belief.

=== West Coast Chabad ===
Cunin began West Coast Chabad in 1967. Chabad now runs the largest network of nonsectarian educational and social services under Jewish auspices on the West Coast.

West Coast Chabad Lubavitch is a division of Chabad-Lubavitch, one of the largest religious Jewish organizations in the world. Chabad embraces a philosophy of study, meditation, and social outreach. Combining religious study with proactive community involvement, Chabad's growing array of educational and social services programs has made it a dynamic force in modern Jewish life.

== Involvement with Chabad of Russia ==
Cunin is a member of Agudas Chasidei Chabad of Russia and United States. He is involved in a recovery effort to reclaim ownership of a portion of the Chabad library, controlled by the Russian government.

== Family ==
Shlomo Cunin married Miriam Loksen on November 19, 1964. They had 13 children together. Shlomo has one brother, Rabbi Pinchas Cunin (d. 2011), who was a rabbi in the Crown Heights Chabad community.
