= Botswana International University of Science and Technology =

University in Palapye, Botswana

Botswana International University of Science & Technology
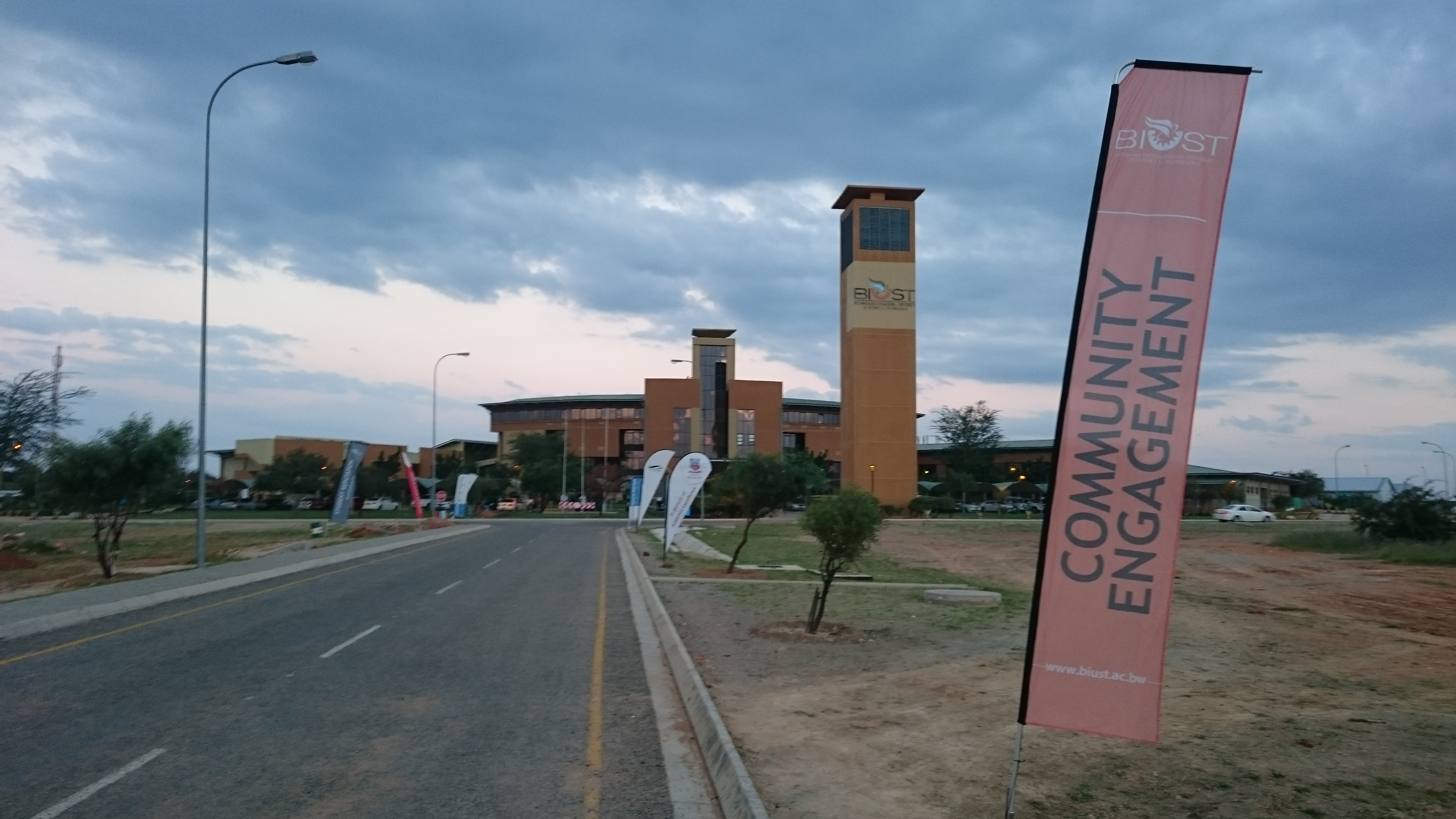
- Motto: Pulsis Mutatio
- Motto in English: Driving Change
- Type: Public
- Established: 2005
- Chairman: Balisi Bonyongo
- Chancellor: Duma Boko
- Vice-Chancellor: Professor Otlogetswe Totolo
- Undergraduates: 1700
- Postgraduates: 200
- Location: (Botswana) Palapye, Botswana
- Campus: Rural
- Colors: Orange, black and white
- Mascot: Cape Buffalo
- Website: www.biust.ac.bw

The Botswana International University of Science & Technology, or BIUST, is an international university located in the town of Palapye, Botswana. It is the nation's second university, after the university of Botswana in the country's capital, Gaborone. The location is a 2,500-hectare (9.7 sq mi) site of gently sloping land on the outskirts of Palapye.

The university was established by the Botswana International University of Science and Technology Act of 2005 as a research-intensive university that specialize in Science, Engineering and Technology at both undergraduate and postgraduate (master's and doctoral) levels. Construction began in December 2009, the contractors being China Civil Engineering Construction. Phase one of the project, worth US$61.5 million (R495.6 million), was funded by the Botswana Government. Spanning two years, the phase included the construction of the administration block, halls of residence for nearly 300 students and houses for 70 staff, laboratories, 256-seater auditorium, indoor sports arena, a student center and book shop, a clinic, and classrooms. Enrollment at the university began in March 2011 and the first semester commenced in August of the same year. The project will accommodate 6,000 students.

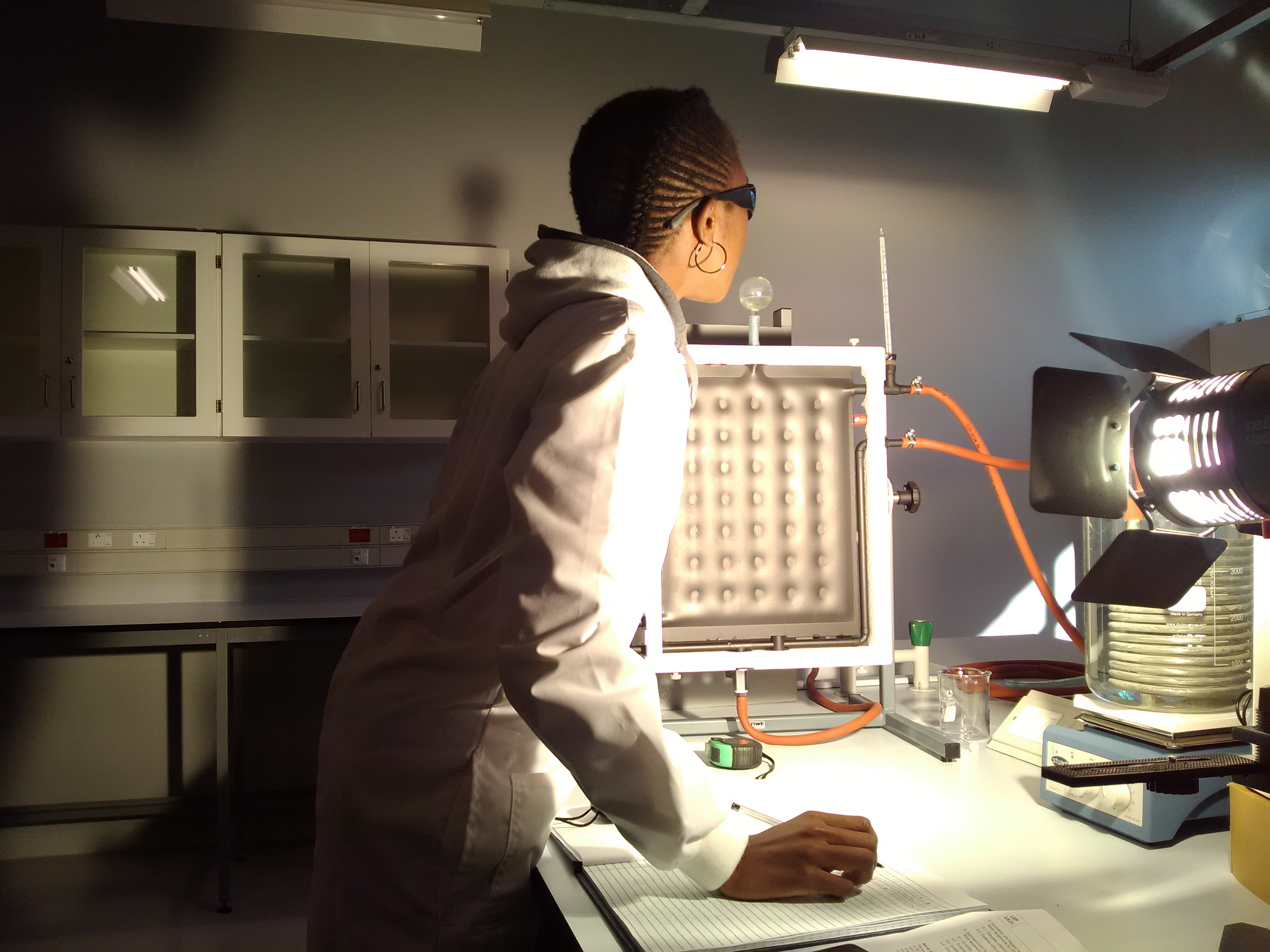
A physicist conducting lab work.

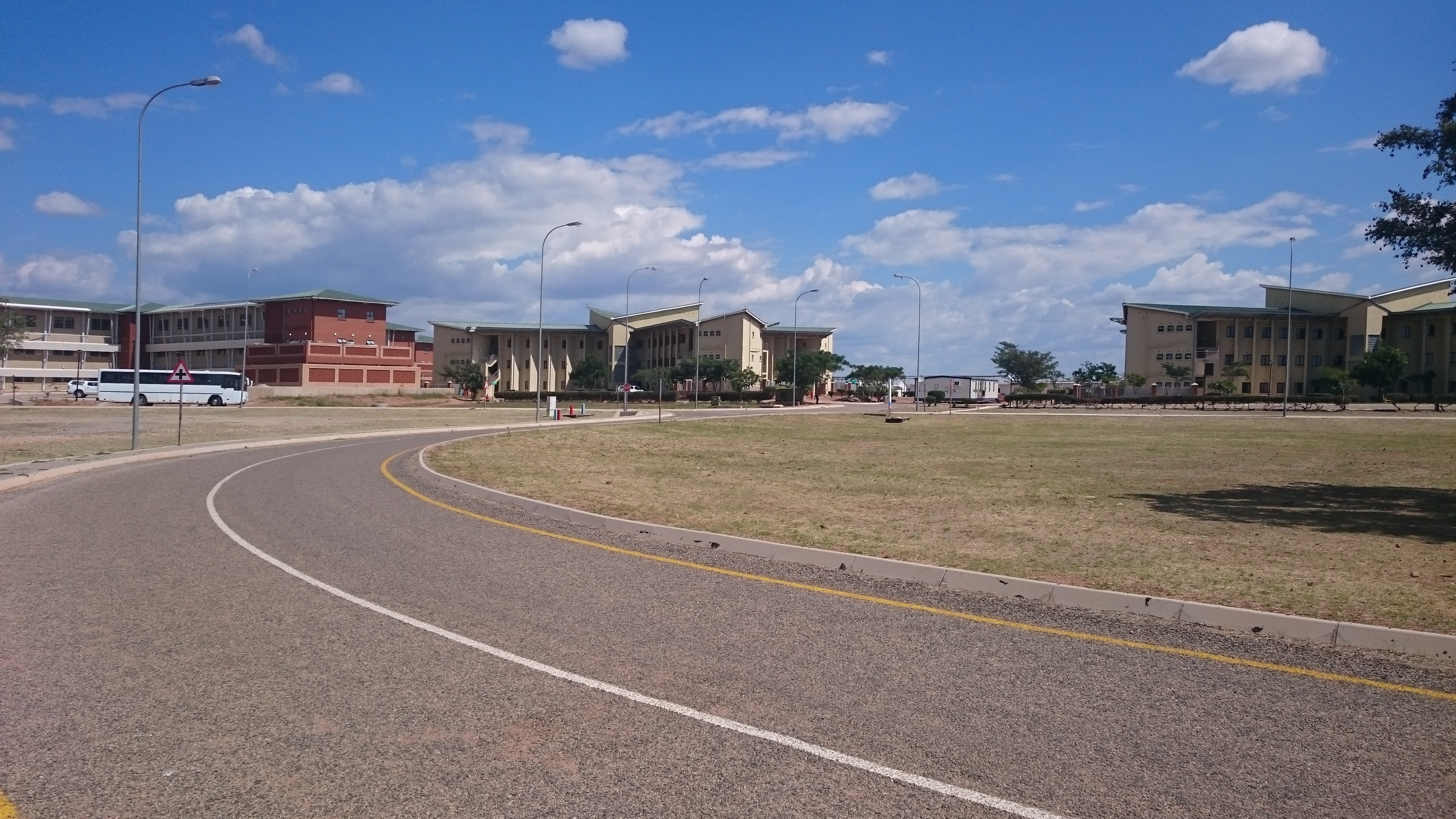
BIUST Campus

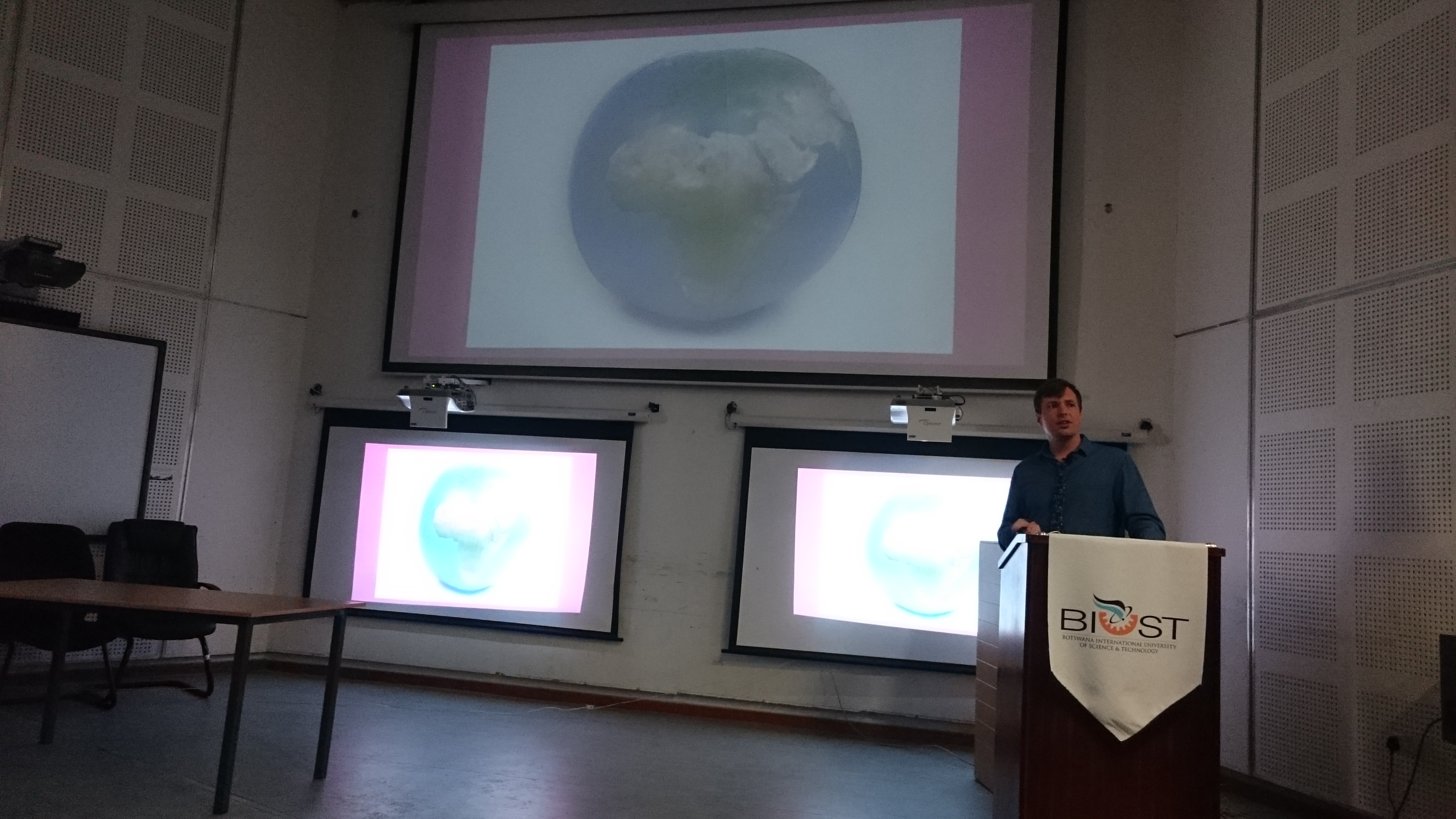
Lecture in BIUST

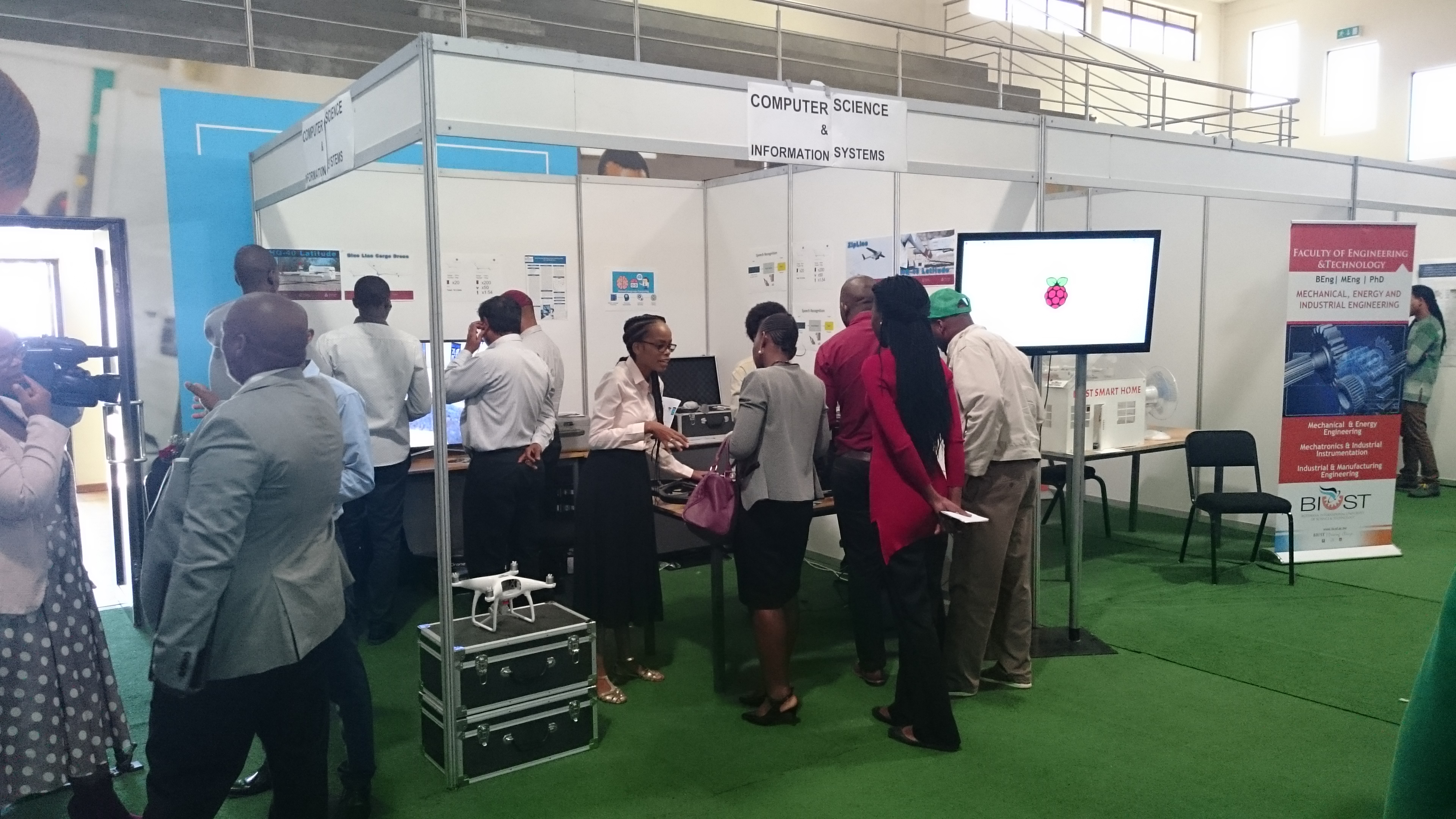
BIUST Recruitment

== Academic structure ==
The university has two Faculties and a center:

- Faculty of Engineering & Technology
- Faculty of Sciences
- Centre for Business Management, Entrepreneurship and General Education

Faculty of Engineering & Technology

- Department of Mining & Geological Engineering
- Department of Mechanical, Energy & Industrial Engineering
- Department of Electrical, Computer & Telecommunications Engineering
- Department of Chemical, Material & Metallurgical Engineering

Faculty of Sciences

- Department of Earth & Environmental Sciences
- Department of Physics & Astronomy
- Department of Mathematics & Statistical Sciences
- Department of Biology & Biotechnological Sciences
- Department of Chemical & Forensic Sciences
- Department of Computer Science & Information Systems

Centre for Business Management, Entrepreneurship and General Education

- Department of Academic Literacy and Social Sciences
- Department of Business, Management and Entrepreneurship

== Governance ==
1. H.E Festus G. Mogae (Chancellor)
2. Mr. Balisi Bonyongo (Council Chairman)
3. Professor Otlogetswe Totolo (Vice Chancellor)
4. Professor Elisha Shemang (DVC Teaching and Learning)
5. Mr. Davies Tele (DVC Finance & Administration)

== BIUST Participates in the World Telecommunications and Informations Society Day 2017 ==
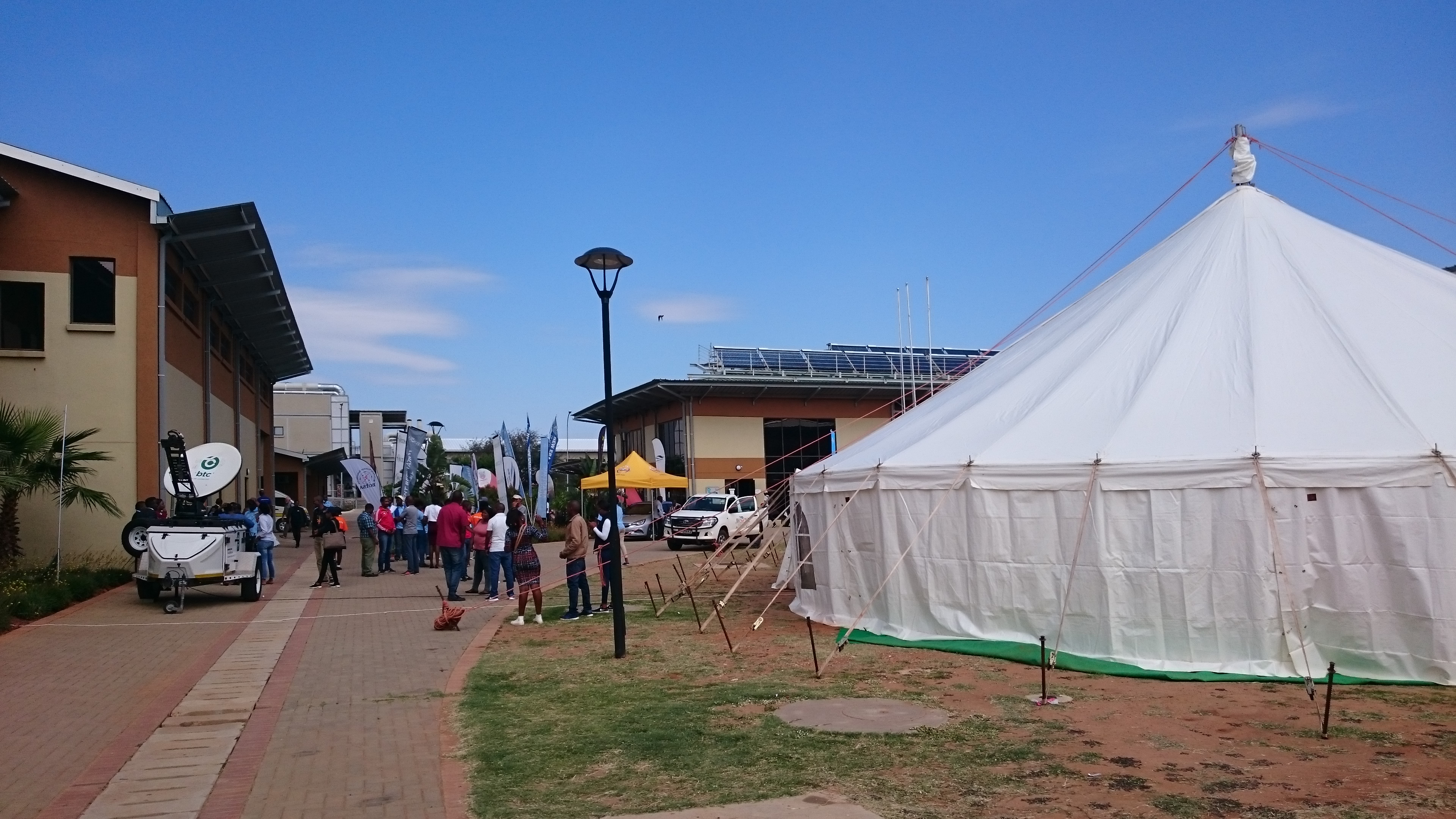
World Telecommunications and Informations Society Day

The World telecommunications and informations society day is an annual event celebrated in the month of May, and brings together different stake holders to discuss issues related to raising awareness about the possibilities that utilizes the internet and other information communication technologies can bring to societies and economies as well as the ways to bridge the digital divide.
17 May marks the celebration of the anniversary of the International Telecommunication Union (ITU) and signing of the first international convention center.
