= Forever Man (album) =

Compilation album by Eric Clapton
- Released: 28 April 2015
- Recorded: 1982–2014
- Genre: Rock, pop, blues
- Length: 224:59 (3-CD/Digital download version); 145:09 (2-CD version); 77:28 (2-LP Vinyl edition)
- Label: Reprise

Eric Clapton chronology
The Breeze: An Appreciation of JJ Cale (2014)	Forever Man (2015)	Slowhand at 70 – Live at the Royal Albert Hall (2015)

Professional ratings
Review scores
Source	Rating
Allmusic	3.5/5 stars

Forever Man is a compilation album by the British rock musician Eric Clapton and was released through Reprise Records.

== Release ==
The pre-order for the compilation album started on March 17, 2015, through the official Eric Clapton website. When ordering the 3-CD and LP-version of the release, a T-shirt with the album's cover, a cup and an 18″ × 24″ lithograph was also available for purchase. On the first day of the album announcement more than 37,000 copies were pre-ordered. With the total pre-order sales being added up, Forever Man reached position ten on the American pre-order chart. Until the actual release in the United States of the album on 28 April 2015, the compilation was pre-ordered more than 151,000 times. In Venezuela the album has been available since April 28, and has sold more than 5,000 copies, becoming a gold record in the first two days. The same release day was set for the United States, Canada and Mexico. In Germany the album was released on May 8. In Italy and Malaysia Forever Man was released one day after the German release date. In the southeastern state, the album quickly sold 7,500 copies in week one becoming a gold record. For the rest of the world the album was made available on May 11.

== Track listings ==
=== Double and triple CD/Digital download versions ===
Disc 1 – Studio
No.	Title	Writer(s)	Place of Origin	Length
1.	"Gotta Get Over" (featuring Chaka Khan)	Doyle Bramhall II, Justin Stanley, Nikka Costa	Old Sock, 2013	4:36
2.	"I've Got a Rock 'n' Roll Heart"	Tony Seals, Troy Seals, Steve Diamond, Eddie Setser	Money and Cigarettes, 1983	3:14
3.	"Run Back to Your Side"	Bramhall, Eric Clapton	Clapton, 2010	5:16
4.	"Tears in Heaven"	Clapton, Will Jennings	Rush soundtrack, 1992	4:32
5.	"Call Me the Breeze"	J.J. Cale	The Breeze: An Appreciation of J.J. Cale, 2014	3:04
6.	"Forever Man"	Jerry Lynn Williams	Behind the Sun, 1985	3:12
7.	"Believe in Life"	Clapton	Reptile, 2001	5:05
8.	"Bad Love"	Clapton, Mick Jones	Journeyman, 1989	5:09
9.	"My Father's Eyes"	Clapton	Pilgrim, 1998	5:23
10.	"Anyway the Wind Blows" (with J.J. Cale)	Cale	The Road to Escondido, 2006	3:56
11.	"Travelin' Alone"	Lil' Son Jackson	Clapton	3:55
12.	"Change the World"	Tommy Sims, Gordon Kennedy, Wayne Kirkpatrick	Phenomenon soundtrack, 1996	3:54
13.	"Behind the Mask"	Ryuichi Sakamoto, Chris Mosdell, Michael Jackson (albeit uncredited)	August, 1986	4:47
14.	"It's in the Way That You Use It"	Clapton, Robbie Robertson	August	4:12
15.	"Pretending"	Williams	Journeyman	4:42
16.	"Riding with the King" (with B.B. King)	John Hiatt	Riding with the King, 2000	4:23
17.	"Circus"	Clapton	Pilgrim	4:09
18.	"Revolution"	Clapton, Simon Climie	Back Home, 2005	4:00

Disc 2 – Live
No.	Title	Writer(s)	Place of Origin	Length
1.	"Badge" (originally by Cream)	Clapton, George Harrison	24 Nights, 1991; originally from Goodbye, 1969	6:53
2.	"Sunshine of Your Love" (originally by Cream)	Jack Bruce, Pete Brown, Clapton	24 Nights; originally from Disraeli Gears, 1967	8:51
3.	"White Room" (originally by Cream)	Bruce, Brown	24 Nights; originally from Wheels of Fire, 1968	6:06
4.	"Wonderful Tonight"	Clapton	24 Nights; originally from Slowhand, 1977	8:59
5.	"Worried Life Blues"	Big Maceo Merriweather	24 Nights	5:17
6.	"Cocaine"	Cale	24 Nights Bootleg as exclusive track 1991; originally from Slowhand	5:05
7.	"Layla" (Unplugged; originally by Derek and the Dominos)	Clapton, Jim Gordon	Unplugged, 1992; originally from Layla and Other Assorted Love Songs, 1970	4:29
8.	"Nobody Knows You When You're Down and Out" (Unplugged)	Jimmy Cox	Unplugged	3:50
9.	"Walkin’ Blues" (Unplugged)	Robert Johnson	Unplugged	3:43
10.	"Them Changes" (with Steve Winwood)	Buddy Miles	Live from Madison Square Garden, 2009	4:58
11.	"Presence of the Lord" (with Steve Winwood; originally by Blind Faith)	Clapton	Live from Madison Square Garden; originally from Blind Faith, 1969	5:11
12.	"Hoochie Coochie Man"	Willie Dixon	One More Car, One More Rider; originally from From the Cradle, 1994	4:34
13.	"Goin' Down Slow"	St. Louis Jimmy Oden	One More Car, One More Rider	5:41
14.	"Over the Rainbow"	Harold Arlen, E.Y. Harburg	One More Car, One More Rider	5:13

Disc 3 – Blues
No.	Title	Writer(s)	Place of Origin	Length
1.	"Before You Accuse Me"	Bo Diddley	Journeyman	3:57
2.	"Last Fair Deal Gone Down"	Johnson	Me and Mr. Johnson, 2004	2:34
3.	"Hold On, I'm Coming" (with B.B. King)	Issac Hayes, David Porter	Riding with the King	6:19
4.	"Terraplane Blues"	Johnson	Sessions for Robert J, 2004	3:36
5.	"It Hurts Me Too"	Tampa Red	From the Cradle	3:18
6.	"Little Queen of Spades"	Johnson	Me and Mr. Johnson	4:58
7.	"Third Degree"	Eddie Boyd, Dixon	From the Cradle	5:10
8.	"Motherless Child"	Robert Hicks	From the Cradle	2:56
9.	"Sportin' Life Blues" (with J.J. Cale)	Brownie McGhee	The Road to Escondido	3:31
10.	"Ramblin' On My Mind"	Johnson	Sessions for Robert J	2:43
11.	"Stop Breakin' Down Blues"	Johnson	Me and Mr. Johnson	2:30
12.	"Everybody Oughta Make a Change"	Sleepy John Estes	Money and Cigarettes	3:17
13.	"Sweet Home Chicago"	Johnson	Sessions for Robert J	5:16
14.	"If I Had Possession Over Judgement Day"	Johnson	Me and Mr. Johnson	3:27
15.	"Hard Times Blues"	Lane Hardin	Clapton	3:42
16.	"Got You on My Mind"	Joe Thomas, Howard Briggs	Reptile	4:30
17.	"I'm Tore Down"	Sonny Thompson	From the Cradle	3:03
18.	"Milkcow's Calf Blues"	Johnson	Sessions for Robert J	3:49
19.	"Key to the Highway" (with B.B. King)	Big Bill Broonzy, Charlie Segar	Riding with the King	3:39

=== Double LP version ===
Side one
No.	Title	Writer(s)	Place of Origin	Length
1.	"Gotta Get Over" (featuring Chaka Khan)	Bramhall, Stanley, Costa	Old Sock	4:36
2.	"I've Got a Rock 'n' Roll Heart"	Seals, Diamond, Setser	Money and Cigarettes	3:14
3.	"Anyway the Wind Blows" (with J.J. Cale)	Cale	The Road to Escondido	3:56
4.	"My Father's Eyes"	Clapton	Pilgrim	5:23
5.	"Motherless Child"	Hicks	From the Cradle	2:56

Side two
No.	Title	Writer(s)	Place of Origin	Length
6.	"Pretending"	Williams	Journeyman	4:42
7.	"Little Queen of Spades"	Johnson	Me and Mr. Johnson	4:58
8.	"Bad Love"	Clapton, Jones	Journeyman	5:09
9.	"Behind the Mask"	Sakamoto, Mosdell, Jackson (albeit uncredited)	August	4:47

Side three
No.	Title	Writer(s)	Place of Origin	Length
10.	"Tears in Heaven"	Clapton, Jennings	Rush soundtrack	4:32
11.	"Change the World"	Sims, Kennedy, Kirkpatrick	Phenomenon soundtrack	3:54
12.	"Call Me the Breeze"	Cale	The Breeze: An Appreciation of J.J. Cale	3:04
13.	"Forever Man"	Williams	Behind the Sun	3:12
14.	"Riding with the King" (with B.B. King)	Hiatt	Riding with the King	4:23

Side four
No.	Title	Writer(s)	Place of Origin	Length
15.	"It's in the Way That You Use It"	Clapton, Robertson	August	4:12
16.	"Circus"	Clapton	Pilgrim	4:09
17.	"Got You on My Mind"	Thomas, Briggs	Reptile	4:30
18.	"Travelin' Alone"	Jackson	Clapton	3:55
19.	"Revolution"	Clapton, Climie	Back Home	4:00

== Critical reception ==
Professional ratings
Review scores
Source	Rating
AllMusic	3.5/5 stars

German music expert Günter Schneidewind recalls the compilation as "abundant piece of work" and thinks that the album shows "Clapton's life-long work pretty well". AllMusic called this Clapton compilation the "by far the most extensive". They critique the track listings of the album saying they "make sense on paper but they're a little odd in practice, with the Studio selections hopscotching between eras and the live heavy on new millennial selections". Going on by recalling it "hardly a botched collection", they round their review up positively recalling that the album "delivers a lot of bang for the buck".

== Charts and certifications ==
=== Weekly charts ===
Chart (2015)	Peak position
Australian Albums (ARIA)	62
Austrian Albums (Ö3 Austria)	22
Belgian Albums (Ultratop Flanders)	21
Belgian Albums (Ultratop Wallonia)	12
Croatian International Albums (HDU)	1
Czech Albums (IFPI ČNS Top 100)	5
Dutch Albums (Album Top 100)	16
French Albums (SNEP)	71
German Albums (Offizielle Top 100)	4
Greek Albums (IFPI)	24
Hungarian Albums (MAHASZ)	5
Indian Albums (IMI)	30
Irish Albums (IRMA)	23
Italian Albums (FIMI)	18
Japanese Albums (Oricon)	8
Mexican Albums (AMPROFON)	78
New Zealand Albums (RMNZ)	37
Norwegian Albums (VG-lista)	38
Portuguese Albums (AFP)	12
Scottish Albums (OCC)	9
South Korea (GAON)	11
Spanish Albums (Promusicae)	18
Swedish Albums (Sverigetopplistan)	46
Swiss Albums (Schweizer Hitparade)	7
Taiwanese Albums (G-Music)	15
UK Album Sales (OCC)	7
UK Albums (OCC)	8
UK Album Downloads (OCC)	48
US Billboard 200	48
US Pre-Order Chart (Soundscan)	10
US Top Album Sales (Billboard)	26
US Top Rock Albums (Billboard)	5
US Indie Store Album Sales (Billboard)	15

=== Year-end charts ===
Chart (2015)	Position
Belgian Albums (Ultratop Flanders)	172
Belgian Albums (Ultratop Wallonia)	114
Dutch Albums (MegaCharts)	100

== Certifications ==
Region	Certification	Certified units/sales
Malaysia	Gold	
Spain (Promusicae)	Gold	20,000^{‡}
Venezuela	Gold	
^{‡} Sales+streaming figures based on certification alone.
