= Clapton Chronicles: The Best of Eric Clapton =

Greatest hits album by Eric Clapton
- Released: 12 October 1999
- Recorded: 1984–1999
- Genre: Rock, hard rock, soft rock
- Length: 67:19
- Label: Duck / Reprise
- Producer: Rob Cavallo, Babyface, Eric Clapton, Simon Climie, Russ Titelman, Tom Dowd, Ted Templeman, Lenny Waronker, Phil Collins

Eric Clapton chronology
Blues (1999)	Clapton Chronicles: The Best of Eric Clapton (1999)	Riding with the King (2000)

Professional ratings
Review scores
Source	Rating
Allmusic	4/5 stars

Clapton Chronicles: The Best of Eric Clapton is a compilation album by English guitarist Eric Clapton featuring his hits from the 1980s and 1990s. The album was released on 12 October 1999 by the Duck / Reprise Records label. Two new songs are included on the disc, "Blue Eyes Blue" which was previously released as a single and "(I) Get Lost" which Clapton wrote for the soundtrack to the film The Story of Us.

== Track listing (CD) ==
No.	Title	Writer(s)	Producer(s)	Length
1.	"Blue Eyes Blue"	Diane Warren	Rob Cavallo	4:42
2.	"Change the World"	Tommy Sims, Gordon Kennedy, Wayne Kirkpatrick	Babyface	3:55
3.	"My Father's Eyes"	Eric Clapton	Clapton & Simon Climie	5:24
4.	"Tears in Heaven"	Eric Clapton, Will Jennings	Russ Titelman	4:33
5.	"Layla" (Unplugged version)	Eric Clapton, Jim Gordon	Russ Titelman	4:37
6.	"Pretending"	Jerry Lynn Williams	Russ Titelman	4:43
7.	"Bad Love"	Eric Clapton, Mick Jones	Russ Titelman	5:14
8.	"Before You Accuse Me (Take a Look at Yourself)"	Ellas McDaniel (Bo Diddley)	Russ Titelman	3:57
9.	"It's in the Way That You Use It"	Clapton, Robbie Robertson	Tom Dowd & Eric Clapton	4:11
10.	"Forever Man"	Jerry Lynn Williams	Ted Templeman & Lenny Waronker	3:11
11.	"Running on Faith" (Unplugged version)	Jerry Lynn Williams	Russ Titelman	6:26
12.	"She's Waiting"	Eric Clapton, Peter Robinson	Phil Collins	4:58
13.	"River of Tears"	Eric Clapton, Simon Climie	Eric Clapton & Simon Climie	7:21
14.	"(I) Get Lost"	Eric Clapton	Eric Clapton & Simon Climie	4:21
15.	"Wonderful Tonight" (Live edit - European bonus track)	Eric Clapton	Russ Titelman	5:24
16.	"Hard Times" (Japanese bonus track)	Ray Charles	Russ Titelman	3:13

== Track listing (DVD) ==
1. "Forever Man" (Williams) – 5:27
2. "Pretending" (Williams) – 4:43
3. "Bad Love" (Clapton, Jones) – 5:14
4. "Wonderful Tonight" (Live) (Clapton) – 9:16
5. "Tears in Heaven" (Clapton, Jennings) – 4:33
6. "Layla" (Live) (Clapton, Gordon) – 4:37
7. "Running on Faith" (Live) (Williams) – 6:26
8. "Motherless Child" (Robert Hicks) – 2:57
9. "Change the World" (Sims, Kennedy, Kirkpatrick) – 3:35
10. "My Father's Eyes" (Clapton, Climie) – 5:24
11. "Pilgrim" (Clapton, Climie) – 5:50
12. "Blue Eyes Blue" (Warren) – 4:24

== Accolades ==
Year	Ceremony	Award	Result	Ref.
1999	Billboard	Best DVD	Won	
2000	RIAJ	Foreign Top Rock Album	Won	

== Personnel ==
- Babyface – producer
- Dave Bargeron – trombone
- Jim Barton – engineer
- Blumpy – programming
- Jeff Bova – organ, synthesizer horn
- Steve Boyer – mixing
- Jimmy Bralower – drum machine
- Michael Brecker – saxophone
- Randy Brecker – trumpet
- Gary Brooker – keyboards, vocals
- David Campbell – string arrangements
- Lenny Castro – percussion, conga
- Rob Cavallo – producer
- Stephen Chase – engineer
- Ed Cherney – engineer
- Eric Clapton – dobro, guitar, vocals, producer, soloist
- Alan Clark – bass, organ, sequencing, synthesizer horn
- Simon Climie – keyboards, producer, Pro Tools
- Phil Collins – drums, producer, vocals
- Luis Conte – percussion
- Ray Cooper – percussion
- Laurence Cottle – bass
- Richard Cottle – synthesizer
- Robert Cray – guitar
- Darryl Crookes – guitar
- Greg Curtis – keyboards, programming, vocals
- Jeff DeMorris – engineer
- Alan Douglas – engineer, mixing
- Tom Dowd – producer
- Donald "Duck" Dunn – bass
- Nathan East – bass, vocals
- Rob Eaton – mixing
- Jon Faddis – trumpet
- Mike Fasano – percussion
- Steve Ferrone – drums
- Steve Gadd – drums
- Brad Gilderman – engineer
- Chyna Gordon – vocals
- Mick Guzauski – mixing
- Alex Haas – engineer
- Lee Herschberg – engineer
- John Jacobs – engineer
- Jim Keltner – drums
- Randy Kerber – synthesizer
- Chaka Khan – vocals
- Katie Kissoon – vocals
- Robbie Kondor – synthesizer
- Nick Launay – engineer
- Chuck Leavell – keyboards
- Gayle Levant – Celtic harp
- Marcy Levy – vocals
- Mark Linett – mixing
- Chris Lord-Alge – mixing
- Andy Fairweather Low – guitar
- Bob Ludwig – mastering
- Steve Lukather – guitar
- Scott Mabuchi – engineer
- JayDee Mannes – pedal steel
- Kevin Mazur – photography
- Jamie Muhoberac – keyboards
- Tessa Niles – vocals
- Dave O'Donnell – engineer
- Jamie Oldaker – drums
- Michael Omartian – synthesizer
- Pino Palladino – bass
- Phil Palmer – guitar
- Greg Phillinganes – piano
- Tim Pierce – guitar
- Jeff Porcaro – drums
- Jack Joseph Puig – engineer
- J. Peter Robinson – synthesizer
- Thom Russo – engineer
- Joe Sample – piano
- Allen Sides – engineer
- Henry Spinetti – drums
- Chris Stainton – organ
- Carol Steele – conga
- Richard Tee – piano
- Ted Templeman – timbales, producer
- Russ Titelman – producer
- Paul Waller – drum programming
- Lenny Waronker – producer
- Norman Watson – photography
- Jerry Lynn Williams – guitar, backing vocals, harmony vocals
- Dave Wittman – Engineer
- Gary Wright – Mixing

== Chart performance ==
=== Weekly charts ===
Chart (1999–2015)	Peak position
Australian Albums (ARIA)	16
Australian Jazz/Blues Albums (ARIA)	1
Austrian Albums (Ö3 Austria)	1
Belgian Albums (Ultratop Flanders)	16
Belgian Albums (Ultratop Wallonia)	8
Belgian Mid Price Albums (Ultratop 20 Flanders)	15
Canadian Top Albums (The Record)	11
Canadian Top Albums/CDs (RPM)	6
Croatian International Albums (HDU)	28
Danish Albums (Hitlisten)	1
Danish Music DVD (Hitlisten)	1
Dutch Albums (Album Top 100)	17
European Top 100 Albums (IFPI)	1
Finnish Albums (Suomen virallinen lista)	2
French Compilation Albums (SNEP)	3
German Albums (Offizielle Top 100)	3
Greek Albums (IFPI)	1
Hungarian Albums (MAHASZ)	14
Irish Albums (IRMA)	7
Italian Albums (FIMI)	17
Japanese Albums (Oricon)	1
Malaysian Albums (RIM)	1
New Zealand Albums (RMNZ)	12
Norwegian Albums (VG-lista)	3
Portuguese Albums (AFP)	2
Romanian Albums (IFPI)	1
Scottish Albums (OCC)	13
Singaporean Albums (SPVA)	1
Spanish Albums (PROMUSICAE)	5
Swedish Albums (Sverigetopplistan)	1
Swiss Albums (Schweizer Hitparade)	5
UK Albums (OCC)	6
UK Physical Albums (OCC)	6
US Billboard 200	20
US Top Internet Albums (Billboard)	14
US Top Music Videos (Billboard)	23

=== Year-end charts ===
Chart (1999)	Position
Austrian Albums (Ö3 Austria)	25
Finnish Albums (Suomen virallinen lista)	43
German Albums Chart	58
Norwegian Albums (VG-lista)	24
Swiss Albums (Schweizer Hitparade)	73
UK Albums (OCC)	56
US Billboard 200	192

Chart (2001)	Position
Australian Jazz/Blues Albums (ARIA)	3

Chart (2002)	Position
Australian Jazz/Blues Albums (ARIA)	7

== Certifications ==
=== Album ===
Region	Certification	Certified units/sales
Argentina (CAPIF)	Platinum	60,000^{^}
Australia (ARIA)	2× Platinum	140,000^{^}
Austria (IFPI Austria)	Platinum	50,000^{*}
Brazil (Pro-Música Brasil)	Gold	100,000^{*}
Canada (Music Canada)	Platinum	188,062
Denmark (IFPI Danmark)	Platinum	50,000^{^}
Finland (Musiikkituottajat)	Gold	38,062
Germany (BVMI)	Platinum	300,000^{^}
Greece (IFPI Greece)	Platinum	30,000^{^}
Hong Kong (IFPI Hong Kong)	Platinum	20,000^{*}
Italy (FIMI)	Gold	50,000^{*}
Japan (RIAJ)	2× Million	2,000,000^{^}
Malaysia	Gold	
New Zealand (RMNZ)	Platinum	15,000^{‡}
Norway (IFPI Norway)	Gold	25,000^{*}
Portugal (AFP)	Platinum	40,000^{^}
Singapore (RIAS)	Platinum	15,000^{*}
Spain (Promusicae)	2× Platinum	200,000^{^}
Sweden (GLF)	Platinum	80,000^{^}
Switzerland (IFPI Switzerland)	Gold	25,000^{^}
Taiwan (RIT)	Gold	25,000^{*}
United Kingdom (BPI)	2× Platinum	600,000^{^}
United States (RIAA)	Platinum	1,778,928
Summaries
Europe (IFPI)	2× Platinum	2,000,000^{*}
^{*} Sales figures based on certification alone.^{^} Shipments figures based on certification alone.^{‡} Sales+streaming figures based on certification alone.

=== Video ===
Region	Certification	Certified units/sales
Argentina (CAPIF)	2× Platinum	16,000^{^}
Australia (ARIA)	Platinum	15,000^{^}
Canada (Music Canada)	2× Platinum	20,000^{^}
Denmark (IFPI Danmark)	Gold	25,000^{^}
United States (RIAA)	Gold	50,000^{^}
^{*} Sales figures based on certification alone.^{^} Shipments figures based on certification alone.
