= Slowhand at 70 – Live at the Royal Albert Hall =

Live album by Eric Clapton
- Released: 13 November 2015
- Recorded: 21 May 2015
- Venue: Royal Albert Hall
- Genre: Blues rock · blues
- Length: 52:06 (Cinema release); 118:59 (Double CD); 119:19 (DVD/Blu-Ray re-release)
- Label: Eagle · Universal · Warner
- Producer: Audrey Davenport

Eric Clapton chronology
Forever Man (2015)	Slowhand at 70 – Live at the Royal Albert Hall (2015)	I Still Do (2016)

Singles from Slowhand at 70 – Live at the Royal Albert Hall
- 1. "Cocaine" Released: 1 September 2015

Slowhand at 70 – Live at the Royal Albert Hall is a November 2015 album by Eric Clapton recorded live at the Royal Albert Hall on 21 May 2015 during his "70th Birthday Celebration" tour. A film of the concert was released on 14 September 2015 via cinema broadcasting in various territories. The cinema release included a report on Clapton's history at the Royal Albert Hall. A DVD, Blu-ray, compact disc and gramophone record release of the performance was released on 13 November 2015.

== Recording ==
Keyboardist Paul Carrack recalled in an interview with the Canadian National Post: "I thought the playing was amazing. Eric doesn't make much fuss about the fact that it's the 70th so in that respect it was just like any other gig but there was a special atmosphere in the hall. When we came off stage the first night Eric said he wasn't gonna let it go on. I think the second night must have been a lot better. [...] With Eric, playing at the Albert Hall … it's really just about the music. It feels like you're playing in a small club, almost. Especially when you've been out playing those big auditoriums, which aren't built for music. But the Albert Hall has this wonderful, intimate atmosphere".

== Content ==
According to the official release announcement, the movie features "classic songs and fan favourites from throughout Eric Clapton's career." These include tracks the British rock musician recorded with the bands Cream and Derek & the Dominos and titles Clapton made famous throughout his extensive career as a solo artist. The track listing features hit single releases including "Layla", "I Shot the Sheriff", "Tears in Heaven" and "Wonderful Tonight". A special featurette filmed for cinema audiences only consists of interviews by Paul Gambaccini with both fellow band members Paul Carrack, Andy Fairweather Low and Chris Stainton, as well as music journalists Paul Sexton and Hugh Fielder. Besides showing Clapton, who plays guitar and sings at the performance, the six-piece band of Stainton and Carrack on keyboards and Hammond organ, Nathan East on bass guitar, Steve Gadd on drums, and Michelle John and Sharon White singing background vocals is shown alongside scenes of the English venue.

== Release ==
Both a trailer and an official announcement were released by Clapton's official management and concert promoters on 19 August 2015 over the internet and social media. The movie, featuring a selected number of songs performed by Clapton at London's Royal Albert Hall on 21 May 2015 during his "70th Birthday Celebration" tour, was released from 14 September 2015 onwards via cinema broadcasting worldwide under license of Arts Alliance, Warner Bros. Records and Eagle Rock Entertainment. On 1 September 2015 a sneak preview featuring Clapton's live performance of "Cocaine" was released. The release features a high-definition picture and 5.1 surround sound. On 31 August 2015 it was announced that a DVD, Blu-ray, compact disc and gramophone record version of the recordings would be released on 13 November 2015 through Eagle Rock Entertainment. A DVD and three vinyl record package was made available through pre-order via Amazon.com on 16 September 2015. Just before the release was made visible on Amazon.com, an executive of Germany's Warner Music Group told the German radio station Radio NRW that there would be limited gramophone record pressings of the recordings made for the market. On 13 November 2015, the following packages were released: Double DVD with double CD, gramophone record, double CD, DVD, Blu-ray disc and a triple vinyl release with included DVD.

== Track listings ==
Cinema release track listing
No.	Title	Writer(s)	Length
1.	"Somebody's Knockin' on My Door"	J. J. Cale	7:08
2.	"Key to the Highway"	Big Bill Broonzy · Charlie Segar	5:06
3.	"Tell the Truth"	Eric Clapton · Bobby Whitlock	6:37
4.	"Pretending"	Jerry Lynn Williams	5:35
5.	"Hoochie Coochie Man"	Willie Dixon	5:25
6.	"You Are So Beautiful" (Featuring Paul Carrack)	Billy Preston · Bruce Fisher	4:45
7.	"Can't Find My Way Home" (Featuring Nathan East)	Steve Winwood	6:16
8.	"I Shot the Sheriff"	Bob Marley	9:30
9.	"Driftin' Blues"	Charles Brown · Johnny Moore · Eddie Williams	6:30
10.	"Nobody Knows You When You're Down and Out"	Jimmy Cox	3:32
11.	"Tears in Heaven"	Eric Clapton · Will Jennings	5:02
12.	"Layla"	Eric Clapton · Jim Gordon	6:57
13.	"Let It Rain"	Eric Clapton · Bonnie Bramlett	5:35
14.	"Wonderful Tonight"	Eric Clapton	3:55
15.	"Crossroads"	Robert Johnson	6:07
16.	"Cocaine"	J. J. Cale	8:51
17.	"High Time We Went" (Featuring Andy Fairweather Low)	Joe Cocker · Chris Stainton	5:37
Total length:			52:06

Double CD track listing – Disc 1
No.	Title	Writer(s)	Length
1.	"Somebody's Knockin' on My Door"	JJ Cale	7:08
2.	"Key to the Highway"	Big Bill Broonzy · Charlie Segar	5:06
3.	"Tell the Truth"	Eric Clapton · Bobby Whitlock	6:37
4.	"Pretending"	Jerry Lynn Williams	5:35
5.	"Hoochie Coochie Man"	Willie Dixon	5:25
6.	"You Are So Beautiful" (Featuring Paul Carrack)	Billy Preston · Bruce Fisher	4:45
7.	"Can't Find My Way Home" (Featuring Nathan East)	Steve Winwood	6:16
8.	"I Shot the Sheriff"	Bob Marley	9:30
Total length:			50:22

Double CD track listing – Disc 2
No.	Title	Writer(s)	Length
1.	"Driftin' Blues"	Charles Brown · Johnny Moore · Eddie Williams	6:30
2.	"Nobody Knows You When You're Down and Out"	Jimmy Cox	3:32
3.	"Tears in Heaven"	Eric Clapton · Will Jennings	5:02
4.	"Layla"	Eric Clapton · Jim Gordon	6:57
5.	"Let It Rain"	Eric Clapton · Bonnie Bramlett	5:35
6.	"Wonderful Tonight"	Eric Clapton	3:55
7.	"Crossroads"	Robert Johnson	6:07
8.	"Little Queen of Spades"	Robert Johnson	16:51
9.	"Cocaine"	JJ Cale	8:51
10.	"High Time We Went" (Featuring Paul Carrack · Andy Fairweather Low)	Joe Cocker · Chris Stainton	5:37
Total length:			68:57

DVD/Blu-ray release track listing
No.	Title	Writer(s)	Length
1.	"Somebody's Knockin' on My Door"	JJ Cale	7:08
2.	"Key to the Highway"	Big Bill Broonzy · Charlie Segar	5:06
3.	"Tell the Truth"	Eric Clapton · Bobby Whitlock	6:37
4.	"Pretending"	Jerry Lynn Williams	5:35
5.	"Hoochie Coochie Man"	Willie Dixon	5:25
6.	"You Are So Beautiful" (Featuring Paul Carrack)	Billy Preston · Bruce Fisher	4:45
7.	"Can't Find My Way Home" (Featuring Nathan East)	Steve Winwood	6:16
8.	"I Shot the Sheriff"	Bob Marley	9:30
9.	"Driftin' Blues"	Charles Brown · Johnny Moore · Eddie Williams	6:30
10.	"Nobody Knows You When You're Down and Out"	Jimmy Cox	3:32
11.	"Tears in Heaven"	Eric Clapton · Will Jennings	5:02
12.	"Layla"	Eric Clapton · Jim Gordon	6:57
13.	"Let It Rain"	Eric Clapton · Bonnie Bramlett	5:35
14.	"Wonderful Tonight"	Eric Clapton	3:55
15.	"Crossroads"	Robert Johnson	6:07
16.	"Cocaine"	JJ Cale	8:51
17.	"High Time We Went" (Featuring Paul Carrack · Andy Fairweather Low)	Joe Cocker · Chris Stainton	5:37
18.	"Little Queen of Spades" (Bonus Track)	Robert Johnson	16:51
Total length:			119:19

== Personnel ==
Taken from the album's liner notes.

- Eric Clapton – electric and acoustic guitar · lead vocals
- Chris Stainton – keyboards
- Paul Carrack – keyboards · Hammond organ · background vocals
- Andy Fairweather Low – guitar · vocals – High Time We Went
- Nathan East – bass guitar · background vocals
- Steve Gadd – drums
- Michelle John – background vocals
- Sharon White – background vocals
- Paul Gambaccini – interviews
- Blue Leach – director
- Simon Climie – audio mixing · audio production
- Alan Douglas – engineer · additional engineering
- Audrey Davenport – producer
- Luca Ciuti – director of photography
- Bob Ludwig – audio mastering
- George Chin – photographs
- Stuart Green – package design
- Martin Dacre – legal issues
- Michael Eaton – executive producer
- Martin Dacre – executive producer
- Peter Worsley – supervising producer
- Simon Hosken – executive production
- Melissa Morton-Hicks – production manager
- Rebecca Bradshaw – legal issues
- Charlotte Godfrey – legal issues
- Paul Bullock – production assistant
- Mark Fossitt – production co-ordinator
- Claire Higgins – production co-ordinator
- Rosie Holley – production manager
- Terry Shand – executive producers
- Geoff Kempin – executive producer

== Critical reception ==
Music journalist Or Barnea of Utab Music calls the concert documentary "fantastic" and notes, Clapton and his band perform on stage "like never seen before".

== Charts ==
Chart (2015–16)	Peak position
Australian Music DVD (ARIA)	5
Austrian Music DVD (Ö3 Austria)	1
Belgian Albums (Ultratop Wallonia)	170
Belgian Music DVD (Ultratop Flanders)	3
Belgian Music DVD (Ultratop Wallonia)	1
Dutch Albums (Album Top 100)	75
Dutch Music DVD (MegaCharts)	2
Finnish Music DVD (Suomen virallinen lista)	1
French Music DVD (SNEP)	1
German Albums (Offizielle Top 100)	6
German Music DVD (Offizielle Top 10)	1
Hong Kong Music DVD (IFPI)	1
Italian Music DVD (FIMI)	1
Japanese Music Blu-ray (Oricon)	7
Japanese Music DVD (Oricon)	17
Spanish Music DVD (PROMUSICAE)	5
Swedish Music DVD (Sverigetopplistan)	1
Swiss Albums (Schweizer Hitparade)	19
Swiss Music DVD (Schweizer Hitparade)	1
UK Music Video (OCC)	2
US Music Video (Billboard)	1

== Video certifications ==
Region	Certification	Certified units/sales
Germany (BVMI)	Gold	25,000^{^}
United Kingdom (BPI)	Gold	25,000^{*}
^{*} Sales figures based on certification alone.^{^} Shipments figures based on certification alone.
