= Bad Love (Eric Clapton song) =

Single by Eric Clapton

from the album Journeyman
- B-side: "Before You Accuse Me"
- Released: January 1990 (UK)
- Genre: Rock
- Length: 5:08
- Label: Warner · Reprise
- Songwriter: Eric Clapton · Mick Jones
- Producer: Russ Titelman

Eric Clapton singles chronology
"Pretending" (1989)	"Bad Love" (1990)	"No Alibis" (1990)

Music video
- "Bad Love" on YouTube

"Bad Love" is a song recorded by English singer and guitarist Eric Clapton, who co-wrote it with Foreigner's lead guitarist Mick Jones. The track was released in the UK in January 1990 as the first single from Clapton's eleventh studio album, Journeyman (1989). The song features Phil Collins on drums and harmony background vocals. It was produced by Clapton's then long-time partner Russ Titelman and reached numbers 73 and 88 on the US Cash Box Top 100 and Billboard Hot 100. At the 33rd Annual Grammy Awards, Clapton won an award for Best Male Rock Vocal Performance. The single release reached various international single music charts and sold a total of 250,000 copies worldwide. A music video was released in 1989 to accompany the single release.

== Release ==
"Bad Love" was released as the second US single from Eric Clapton's 1989 studio album Journeyman in March 1990. However, promotional single releases in the United Kingdom on 7-inch vinyl, and in the United States on a CD single were released in 1989 under license of Warner Bros. Records. For whole of Europe and the United States, the single was released on both 7 and 12 inch vinyl and CD in 1990. The recording was produced by Russ Titelman, who later also produced several albums for Eric Clapton under Reprise and Warner Bros. Records. Other territories in which the single has been released include Australia, Brazil, Japan, Taiwan and Thailand, where it also was released as a B-side to a later single or track of a compilation album.

== Personnel ==
The original recording features Clapton playing electric guitar and singing lead vocals alongside Phil Collins' drumming and harmony background singing. Alan Clark acts as the keyboardist on the release, which includes Pino Palladino on bass guitar. The publishing rights to both the song and release belong to Unichappell Music, Incorporated. While promoting the album during his two-year "Journeyman World Tour" in 1990 and 1991, Clapton performed the song with a different band line-up including Nathan East on bass guitar, Greg Phillinganes on keyboards, Chuck Leavell on the Hammond organ, Steve Ferrone on drums, Ray Cooper on percussion, Phil Palmer on rhythm guitar as well as Tessa Niles and Katie Kissoon on backing vocals. Clapton released a live interpretation of "Bad Love" on his album 24 Nights with the band line-up mentioned above, released on 8 October 1991. Clapton also released the track on various compilation albums including Clapton Chronicles: The Best of Eric Clapton (1999), Complete Clapton (2007) and Forever Man (2015). In total, the song has been released on over 15 albums.

== Track listing ==
7" vinyl release
No.	Title	Writer(s)	Length
1.	"Bad Love"	Eric Clapton · Mick Jones	5:08
2.	"Before You Accuse Me"	Bo Diddley	3:57
Total length:			9:15

== Credits ==
- Eric Clapton – lead vocals, guitar
- Phil Palmer – guitar
- Alan Clark – keyboards
- Pino Palladino – bass
- Phil Collins – drums, backing and harmony vocals
- Katie Kissoon – backing vocals
- Tessa Niles – backing vocals

== Composition ==
In an interview with his official fan club "Where's Eric!", Clapton remembered how the song came about: "Warner Bros. wanted another "Layla". I thought, well, if you sit down and write a song in a formatted way, it's not so hard. You think, 'What was "Layla" comprised of? A fiery intro modulated into the first verse and chorus with a riff around it. I had this stuff in my head, so I just juggled it around, and Mick Jones (of the group Foreigner) came in to help tidy up. He was the one who said 'You should put a "Badge" middle in there'. So, we did that. Although it sounds like a cold way of doing it, it actually took on its own life".

The song consists of two verses and one chorus which is sung between the two verses and three times after the second verse ended. The chorus is in the scale of D Dorian and the solo in D Mixolydian. The verses are played and sung in the key of A major.

== Music video ==
A self-titled music video to accompany the "Bad Love" single release was filmed and released in 1989. The music video was shot in a black and white picture and features Clapton playing and singing the song alongside Nathan East on bass guitar and vocals, Greg Phillinganes on keyboards and vocals as well as Phil Collins, who is on drums and also sings backing vocals. The quartet is shown performing the title on stage while Clapton rehearsed for his, then, upcoming "Journeyman World Tour". The main video action is interrupted with film sequences that show off-stage actions like camera and lightning arrangements and Clapton chatting to his fellow band members. The "Bad Love" video was frequently aired on MTV, VH1, MuchMusic, and Fuse TV. The music video was re-released on 12 October 1999, on the Clapton Chronicles: The Best of Eric Clapton DVD.

== Accolades ==
Year	Ceremony	Award	Result	Ref.
1991	Grammy Award	Best Rock Vocal Performance, Male	Won	

== Chart performance ==
In the United States, the song reached number 88 on the Billboard Hot 100 singles chart, where it stayed a total of five weeks. "Bad Love" was more successful on the Mainstream Rock songs chart, also compiled by the Billboard magazine, where it peaked at number one and stayed a total 21 weeks on the chart. The song was Clapton's last number-one hit to reach the Billboard Mainstream Rock songs chart. It stayed on top of the chart for three weeks. The single sold a total of 129,482 copies in the five weeks on the Hot 100 singles chart. In the United Kingdom, the release peaked at number 25 on the Official Charts Company's compilation, where it stayed seven weeks and sold 48,272 copies in the country. In Canada, "Bad Love" peaked at number 56 on the singles charts compiled by the RPM magazine, selling 2,001 copies, while on the chart. In Italy, the single release peaked at position 39. In Japan, the album ranked on number ten on the Oricon international singles chart, selling more than 50,000 copies in total and becoming a gold record within a month. In the Netherlands, the single positioned itself at place 83 on the MegaCharts singles chart. According to Clapton himself, the release reached the Top 10 in five countries and was awarded with a Gold disc in Portugal and South Africa. In total, the single release sold more than 250,000 copies worldwide.

== Critical reception ==
Music critic Scott Floman notes that the song "rocked just hard enough while containing catchy choruses" and that "Bad Love" is a "catchy faster paced number which saw Clapton really letting loose on guitar", which to the critic is "not a surprise", because "the song was co-written with Foreigner's Mick Jones".

== Charts ==
=== Weekly charts ===
Chart (1990)	Peak position
Italy (Musica e dischi)	39
Italy Airplay (Music & Media)	7
Japanese International Singles (Oricon)	10
Netherlands (Single Top 100)	83
UK Singles (Official Charts)	25
US Billboard Hot 100	88
US Mainstream Rock Airplay (Billboard)	1
US Cash Box Top 100	73

=== Year-end charts ===
Chart (1990)	Position
Japanese International Singles (Oricon)	99

== Certifications ==
Region	Certification	Certified units/sales
Japan (RIAJ)	Gold	50,000^{^}
^{^} Shipments figures based on certification alone.

== Release history ==
Region	Year	Formats	Label	Ref.
United Kingdom	1989	12" CD Maxi single	Warner	
Brazil	1990	12" CD Maxi single	Warner	
Germany	1990	7" vinyl single	Warner	
Japan	1990	12" CD Maxi single	Warner	
Spain	1990	7" vinyl single	Warner	
Taiwan	1990	Limited Edition track	Warner	
United States	1990	12" CD Maxi single	Warner	
Thailand	1999	Limited Edition track	Warner	
Australia	2005	Limited Edition track	Warner	

== Media appearance ==
In 1990, Eric Clapton filmed a television advertisement for the Japanese car company Honda Motor Co. Ltd. The filming took place in a New York City recording studio. In the commercial, which was shown frequently on worldwide television, the British rock musician is seen and heard overdubbing an extra guitar line, that Eric Clapton improvised, onto the song "Bad Love". For the commercial Eric Clapton brought his famous black Fender Stratocaster, "Blackie", out of retirement at the request of Honda Motor in Japan.
