= I Still Do =

Studio album by Eric Clapton
- Released: 20 May 2016
- Studio: British Grove Studios
- Genre: Blues; blues rock; folk
- Length: 54:07
- Label: Bushbranch/Surfdog
- Producer: Glyn Johns

Eric Clapton chronology
Slowhand at 70 – Live at the Royal Albert Hall (2015)	I Still Do (2016)	Live in San Diego (2016)

I Still Do is the twentieth solo studio album by English musician Eric Clapton. It was released in 2016 through the independent Bushbranch Records/Surfdog Records label. The album is a combination of new material written by Clapton and classic songs, contemporary tunes, and influences interpreted in his own style.

The album was produced by Glyn Johns who had worked with Clapton on Slowhand (1977) and Backless (1978). The album's artwork is a painting of Clapton by Peter Blake who also previously worked with Clapton. It is the follow-up to Clapton's global hit album The Breeze: An Appreciation of JJ Cale, released in the summer of 2014, his compilation album Forever Man, released in the spring of 2015 and also his commercially successful concert film and live album Slowhand at 70 – Live at the Royal Albert Hall released in late 2015.

== Production ==
The album was produced by Glyn Johns, who had been producer on Clapton's successful albums Slowhand (1977) and Backless (1978).

The album cover consists of a portrait of Clapton by Peter Blake who had previously designed multiple pages of artwork for Clapton's 1991 album 24 Nights as well as a photo book, containing all of his drawings of Clapton, his band and the Royal Albert Hall in which the album was recorded from 1990 to 1991.

Media interest was aroused by the listing of Angelo Mysterioso as contributing to "I Will Be There" as it is similar to L'Angelo Misterioso, a pseudonym used occasionally by George Harrison. After Clapton refused to make an official statement, the media began to speculate whether it might be Dhani Harrison playing on the new release. A spokesman for Clapton told Examiner.com on 2 March 2016 that neither Clapton himself nor his management or Clapton's record companies will be revealing the actual identity of "Angelo Mysterioso". In a brief statement, the spokesman wrote: "We aren't going to be saying who it is. Now or ever [...]". Also, it was never officially approved or denied if Dhani Harrison appears on the release. Ed Sheeran joined Clapton on stage at the Nippon Budokan Tokyo, Japan on 13 April 2016 for "I Will Be There", leading to speculation that he is in fact Angelo Mysterioso. Sheeran also sang "Cypress Grove" and "Sunshine State" at the same concert. Since then, Sheeran's album ÷ was released, also crediting 'Angelo Mysterioso' with a guitar solo, leading to speculation of an arrangement between the two. Speaking to People magazine, Sheeran confirmed the collaboration.

== Release and promotion ==
I Still Do was announced on 18 February 2016. The album is available as a digital download, on gramophone record (two vinyl discs, each with three songs per side and played at 45 rpm for better audio) and on compact disc. There is also a limited edition vacuum tube shaped USB and CD release in a denim box with bonus materials. The bonuses include two exclusive tracks "Lonesome" and "Freight Train" plus 45 minutes of video featuring intimate interviews, behind the scenes clips of recording sessions, live performances and more, and 10 behind the scenes polaroid photo prints. Clapton's independent Bushbranch and Surfdog Records labels distribute the album to worldwide territories.

== Critical reception ==
Professional ratings
Aggregate scores
Source	Rating
AnyDecentMusic?	6.2/10
Metacritic	74/100
Review scores
Source	Rating
AllMusic	3.5/5 stars
American Songwriter	3.5/5 stars
The Independent	4/5 stars
Rolling Stone	3.5/5 stars

Jon M. Gilbertson, indicating in a review from Milwaukee Journal Sentinel, opines, "'I Still Do' is not a dramatic statement, but it is sturdy enough to earn another alternate title: 'I'm Still Here.'"

Andy Gill of The Independent praised the album, stating:

Reuniting him with Slowhand/Backless producer Glyn Johns for the first time in four decades, I Still Do is Eric Clapton’s most assured album in ages, its understated poise and refinement reflecting the influence of his late compadre JJ Cale...

== Track listing ==
Standard version
No.	Title	Writer(s)	Length
1.	"Alabama Woman Blues"	Leroy Carr	5:06
2.	"Can't Let You Do It"	J. J. Cale	3:50
3.	"I Will Be There" (featuring Angelo Mysterioso)	Paul Brady, John O'Kane	4:37
4.	"Spiral"	Eric Clapton, Andy Fairweather Low, Simon Climie	5:04
5.	"Catch the Blues"	Eric Clapton	4:51
6.	"Cypress Grove"	Skip James	4:49
7.	"Little Man, You've Had a Busy Day"	Maurice Sigler, Mabel Wayne, Al Hoffman	3:11
8.	"Stones in My Passway"	Robert Johnson	4:03
9.	"I Dreamed I Saw St. Augustine"	Bob Dylan	4:02
10.	"I'll Be Alright"	Traditional	4:23
11.	"Somebody's Knockin'"	J. J. Cale	5:11
12.	"I'll Be Seeing You"	Irving Kahal, Sammy Fain	5:00

Limited Edition "Denim Box" version – Bonus Tracks
No.	Title	Length
13.	"Lonesome"
14.	"Freight Train"

== Personnel ==
- Eric Clapton – lead vocals, acoustic guitar, electric guitar, slide guitar, tambourine
- Paul Brady – acoustic guitar, backing vocals
- Andy Fairweather Low – acoustic guitar, electric guitar, backing vocals
- Angelo Mysterioso – acoustic guitar (3), backing vocals (3)
- Simon Climie – acoustic guitar, electric guitar, keyboards
- Walt Richmond – keyboards
- Chris Stainton – keyboards
- Paul Carrack – Hammond organ, backing vocals
- Dave Bronze – bass guitar, double bass
- Henry Spinetti – drums, percussion
- Ethan Johns – percussion
- Dirk Powell – accordion, mandolin, backing vocals
- Michelle John – backing vocals
- Sharon White – backing vocals

== Production ==
- Producer and Mixing – Glyn Johns
- Engineers – Martin Hollis and Glyn Johns
- Assistant Engineer – Rowan McIntosh
- Mastered by Bob Ludwig at Gateway Mastering (Portland, ME).
- Art Direction and Design – Catherine Roylance
- Layout – Brice Beckham
- Artwork Technician – Matthew Gordon
- Cover Painting – Sir Peter Blake
- Photography – Catherine Roylance, Nick Roylance, Craig Stecyk, Simon Whitehead and Getty Images.

== Charts ==
=== Weekly charts ===
Chart (2016)	Peak position
Argentine Albums (CAPIF)	5
Australian Albums (ARIA)	10
Austrian Albums (Ö3 Austria)	3
Belgian Albums (Ultratop Flanders)	10
Belgian Albums (Ultratop Wallonia)	4
Canadian Albums (Billboard)	11
Croatian International Albums (HDU)	1
Czech Albums (ČNS IFPI)	1
Danish Albums (Hitlisten)	31
Dutch Albums (Album Top 100)	5
Finnish Albums (Suomen virallinen lista)	48
French Albums (SNEP)	9
German Albums (Offizielle Top 100)	5
Greek Albums (IFPI)	27
Hungarian Albums (MAHASZ)	23
Irish Albums (IRMA)	18
Israeli Albums (IFPI)	1
Italian Albums (FIMI)	12
Japanese Albums (Oricon)	10
Japanese International Albums (Oricon)	2
New Zealand Albums (RMNZ)	5
Norwegian Albums (VG-lista)	12
Polish Albums (ZPAV)	12
Portuguese Albums (AFP)	12
Scottish Albums (OCC)	5
Spanish Albums (Promusicae)	6
Swedish Albums (Sverigetopplistan)	13
Swiss Albums (Schweizer Hitparade)	1
Taiwanese Albums (Five Music)	12
UK Albums (OCC)	6
UK Jazz & Blues Albums (OCC)	1
Uruguayan Albums (CUD)	11
US Billboard 200	6
US Independent Albums (Billboard)	1
US Top Blues Albums (Billboard)	1
US Top Rock Albums (Billboard)	1
US Vinyl Albums (Billboard)	4

=== Year-end charts ===
Chart (2016)	Position
Belgian Albums (Ultratop Flanders)	139
Belgian Albums (Ultratop Wallonia)	74
Swiss Albums (Schweizer Hitparade)	93
US Top Rock Albums (Billboard)	28

=== Singles ===
Singles on Billboard's Blues Digital Songs	Peak
"Somebody's Knockin'"	3
"Can't Let You Do It"	5
"Spiral"	8
"Alabama Woman Blues"	10
"I'll Be Seeing You"	13
"Catch The Blues"	15
"Stones In My Passway"	18
"I Dreamed I Saw St. Augustine"	19
