= Blues (Eric Clapton album) =

Compilation album by Eric Clapton
- Released: 27 July 1999
- Recorded: 1970–1980
- Genre: Blues rock
- Length: 146:08
- Label: PolyGram

Eric Clapton chronology
Pilgrim (1998)	Blues (1999)	Clapton Chronicles: The Best of Eric Clapton (1999)

Professional ratings
Review scores
Source	Rating
AllMusic link	4/5 stars
Rolling Stone link	4/5 stars

Blues is a blues rock compilation album by Eric Clapton released in 1999. The release features songs from Clapton's 1970s RSO albums, as well as some unreleased material from the same era. The second disc features live recordings.

== Track listing ==
=== Disc one (studio blues) ===
1. "Before You Accuse Me (Take a Look at Yourself)" (Ellas McDaniel) – 4:39 (Previously unreleased acoustic outtake from Backless, 1978)
2. "Mean Old World" (Walter Jacobs) – 3:50 (Outtake from Layla and Other Assorted Love Songs, 1970)
3. "Ain't That Lovin' You" (Jimmy Reed) – 5:26
4. "The Sky Is Crying" (Elmore James) – 3:58
5. "Cryin'" (Eric Clapton) – 2:52
6. "Have You Ever Loved a Woman" (Billy Myles) – 6:51 - Derek and the Dominos
7. "Alberta" (Traditional) – 2:40 (Previously unreleased outtake from Slowhand, 1977)
8. "Early in the Morning" (Traditional arranged by Eric Clapton) – 7:55
9. "Give Me Strength" (Clapton) – 2:51
10. "Meet Me (Down at the Bottom)" (Willie Dixon) – 7:04 (Previously unreleased outtake from 461 Ocean Boulevard, 1974)
11. "County Jail Blues" (Alfred Fields) – 3:56
12. "Floating Bridge" (Sleepy John Estes) – 6:33
13. "Blow Wind Blow" (Muddy Waters) – 2:59
14. "To Make Somebody Happy" (Clapton) – 5:11
15. "Before You Accuse Me (Take a Look at Yourself)" (McDaniel) – 4:39 (Previously unreleased electric outtake from Backless, 1978)

=== Disc two (live blues) ===
1. "Stormy Monday" (T-Bone Walker) – 12:49 (Hammersmith Odeon, Hammersmith, London, England, 27 April 1977), from Crossroads vol. 2: Live in the Seventies
2. "Worried Life Blues" (Big Maceo Merriweather) – 5:57 (Victoria Hall, Hanley, Staffordshire, Stoke-on-Trent, England, 28 November 1978), from Crossroads vol. 2: Live in the Seventies
3. "Early in the Morning" (Traditional arranged by Eric Clapton) – 7:11 (Budokan, Tokyo, Japan, 3 December 1979), from Just One Night
4. "Have You Ever Loved a Woman" (Billy Myles) – 7:47 (Long Beach Arena, Long Beach, California, 19 July 1974), from Crossroads vol. 2: Live in the Seventies
5. "Wonderful Tonight" (Clapton) – 6:23 (Glasgow Apollo, Glasgow, Scotland, 24 November 1978), from Crossroads vol. 2: Live in the Seventies
6. "Kind Hearted Woman" (Robert Johnson) – 5:11 (Glasgow Apollo, Glasgow, Scotland, 24 November 1978), from Crossroads vol. 2: Live in the Seventies
7. "Double Trouble" (Otis Rush) – 8:02 (Budokan, Tokyo, Japan, 3 December 1979), from Just One Night
8. "Driftin' Blues" (Charles Brown/Johnny Moore/Eddie Williams) – 6:57 (Civic Center, Providence, Rhode Island, 25 June 1975), from Crossroads vol. 2: Live in the Seventies
9. "Crossroads" (Robert Johnson) – 5:49 (Victoria Hall, Hanley, Staffordshire, Stoke-on-Trent, England, 28 November 1978), from Crossroads vol. 2: Live in the Seventies
10. "Further on Up the Road" (Joe Medwich Veasey/Don Robey) – 8:38 (Convention Centre, Dallas, 15 November 1976) from Freddie King 1934-1976

=== Bonus disc (included with some early copies of the album) ===
1. "Blues in A" (Clapton) – 10:25 (Previously unreleased jam outtake from Eric Clapton, 1970)
2. "Eric After Hours Blues" (Clapton) – 4:20 (Previously unreleased jam outtake from 461 Ocean Boulevard)
3. "B Minor Jam" (Clapton) – 7:10 (Previously unreleased jam outtake from 461 Ocean Boulevard)
4. "Blues" (Clapton) – 2:59 (Previously unreleased jam outtake from No Reason to Cry, 1976)

== Personnel ==
- Duane Allman – guitar, performer
- Jon Astley – engineer, mixing
- John Bellissimo – photography
- Gary Brooker – keyboards, vocals
- Philip Chapman – mixing
- Eric Clapton – dobro, guitar, arranger, vocals
- The Dominoes – arranger, producer
- Tom Dowd – producer, executive producer
- Yvonne Elliman – vocals
- Rob Fraboni – producer
- Jim Gordon – drums (bass)
- Suha Gur – digital mastering, mixing, digital compilation
- Al Jackson Jr. – drums
- John Jansen – mixing
- Glyn Johns – producer, engineer
- Freddie King – guitar
- Lead Belly – arranger
- Albert Lee – guitar, vocals
- Bill Levenson – mixing, compilation producer
- Marcy Levy – vocals
- Andy MacPherson – mixing
- Jay Mark – mixing
- Dave Markee – bass
- Dave Mason – guitar
- John McDermott – liner notes
- Bill Oakes – producer
- Jamie Oldaker – drums
- Sergio Pastora – percussion
- Ron Pownall – photography
- Michael Putland – photography
- Carl Radle – bass
- Jerry Rappaport – project assistant
- Steve Rinkoff – mixing
- Dick Sims – organ, piano
- Henry Spinetti – percussion, drums
- Chris Stainton – keyboards
- Jackie Stansfield – project coordinator
- George Terry – guitar
- Terri Tierney – project coordinator
- Laurens Van Houten – photography
- Bobby Whitlock – piano
- Ronnie Wood – guitar

== Chart performance ==
=== Weekly charts ===
Chart (1999)	Peak position
Australian Albums (ARIA)	38
French Compilation Albums (SNEP)	23
New Zealand Albums (RMNZ)	10
UK Albums (OCC)	52
US Billboard 200	52

== Certifications ==
Region	Certification	Certified units/sales
New Zealand (RMNZ)	Gold	7,500^{^}
United States (RIAA)	Gold	500,000^{^}
^{^} Shipments figures based on certification alone.
