= No Alibis =

- Australian single cover

Single by Eric Clapton

from the album Journeyman
- B-side: "Running on Faith"
- Released: 19 March 1990
- Genre: Blues rock
- Length: 5:32 album 4:04 single edit
- Label: Reprise Records
- Songwriter(s): Jerry Lynn Williams
- Producer(s): Russ Titelman

Eric Clapton singles chronology
"Bad Love" (1990)	"No Alibis" (1990)	"Run So Far" (1990)

"No Alibis" is a track from Eric Clapton's 1989 album Journeyman. It was released as a single in a shortened version, with "Running on Faith" (also on the Journeyman album) as the B-side. The 12" single and CD maxi-singles, both released the following year, included the longer album version and also added live versions of "Behind the Mask" and "Cocaine", respectively. The live versions were recorded at the National Exhibition Centre in Birmingham, England in July 1986.

"No Alibis" is one of the more commercial rock songs from that record. Author Marc Roberty describes it as "a strong, anthem-like song." The song, written by longtime collaborator Jerry Lynn Williams, combines Clapton's rough, seasoned vocals with guest vocalist Daryl Hall's light vocals. The lyrics are about a man asking his girlfriend or wife not to lie to him further, suggesting that all the lies she tells make the situation worse. During the Journeyman World Tour, performances of this song were particularly energetic. It became a live favorite.

In Clapton's autobiography, he describes that he wrote the songs with Williams, who was credited exclusively, but that Clapton was betrayed by his former partner Lory Del Santo.

The single release of the song reached number 53 on the British charts and stayed there for three weeks. On the US charts, the single reached number 4 on the mainstream rock charts, though it did not enter the Hot 100.

== Personnel ==
- Eric Clapton – lead vocals, guitar
- Greg Phillinganes – keyboards, backing vocals
- Richard Tee – acoustic piano
- Robbie Kondor – synthesizer programming
- Nathan East – bass, backing vocals
- Jimmy Bralower – drum programming
- Carol Steele – percussion
- Daryl Hall – harmony vocals
- Chaka Khan – backing vocals
- Lani Groves – backing vocals
