= 24 Nights =

Live album by Eric Clapton
- Released: 8 October 1991 (US); 14 October 1991 (UK)
- Recorded: January–February 1990; February–March 1991
- Venues: Royal Albert Hall, London
- Genres: Rock, blues
- Length: 105:20 (original album); 347:56 (expanded edition)
- Label: Duck / Reprise
- Producer: Russ Titelman

Eric Clapton chronology
| Journeyman (1989) | 24 Nights (1991) | Rush (1992) |

Singles from 24 Nights
- 1. "Wonderful Tonight" Released: 4 November 1991

Professional ratings
Review scores
| Source | Rating |
|---|---|
| AllMusic | 3/5 stars |
| Christgau's Consumer Guide | (neither) |
| The New York Times | (favourable) |
| Rolling Stone | 3/5 stars |

24 Nights is a live album by Eric Clapton, compiled from 42 concerts performed at the Royal Albert Hall in London, England, in 1990 and 1991. It was released on 8 October 1991. The cover illustration is by Peter Blake. It was reissued in June 2023 as The Definitive 24 Nights in a limited edition box set containing songs which were not included in the original release. The reissue contains 35 previously unreleased performances and the collection is divided into three sets: Rock, Blues, and Orchestral.

== Background ==
Following a record-setting run of 12 concerts at the Royal Albert Hall in 1989, Clapton broke his own record in 1990, playing 18 nights at the venue between 18 January and 10 February 1990, and again in 1991, playing 24 nights between 5 February and 9 March 1991. The album was named after the 1991 run, but included songs from both the 1990 and 1991 runs.

The 1990 concerts were performed with four different ensembles. The first six nights featured a four-piece band, with Clapton, bassist Nathan East, drummer Steve Ferrone and keyboardist Greg Phillinganes. The second six nights featured a 13-piece band, with the four-piece band joined by Phil Palmer on guitar, Alan Clark on keyboards, Ray Cooper on percussion, backing vocalists Katie Kissoon and Tessa Niles, and a four-piece horn section. Then came three nights with a blues band, featuring Johnnie Johnson on keyboards, Richard Cousins on bass, and Jamie Oldaker on drums, plus special guests Buddy Guy and Robert Cray. And finally three orchestra nights, with the nine-piece band joined by the National Philharmonic Orchestra conducted by Michael Kamen.

The 1991 concerts had a similar configuration, with four different ensembles, this time for six nights each. The 13-piece band was trimmed to 9 by removing the horn section. For the nine-piece and orchestral groups, Chuck Leavell was brought in to replace Alan Clark. Phil Collins played some shows in 1991. The blues band was reshuffled, with Joey Spampinato replacing Richard Cousins on bass, and adding Jimmie Vaughan as a regular guitarist, Leavell on keyboards, and Jerry Portnoy on harmonica; Guy and Cray were joined by an additional guest performer, Albert Collins.

== Recordings ==
Four of the 1990 concerts were recorded on both audio and video for the project – the final nights of the 4 piece band (January 24th), 13 piece band (February 1st), and the blues band (February 5th), and the penultimate night with the orchestra (February 9th). Clapton reportedly was not satisfied with these recordings, and delayed the release of a CD until the following year. Another four concerts were shot on video in 1991, one from each ensemble, and many more concerts were recorded in audio.

The CD release used mostly 1990 recordings for the 4-piece, blues band, and orchestral shows, though exclusively 1991 shows were used for the expanded band shows.

The DVD release uses only nights that were shot on video, so the versions of "Old Love" and "Wonderful Tonight", and the ending solo on "Pretending", on the DVD release used the February 18th show, not the versions used on the CD, and the DVD omits Badge and Hoodoo Man entirely.

Many more tracks from the 1991 expanded band shows were also used as b-sides of various CD singles, including an edited version of the CD version of "Wonderful Tonight" from the February 14th show; "No Alibis", "I Shot The Sheriff", and "Layla Intro (A Remark You Made)" from the February 18th show; and a recording of "Cocaine" from the February 19th show.

The Definitive edition largely uses the selections from the CD and DVD releases. It includes the CD version of "Edge Of Darkness", not the DVD version. It follows the DVD in not including "Badge" and "Hoodoo Man". Differences include using a 1991 expanded band version instead of a 1990 4-piece version of "Sunshine Of Your Love", and using a 1990 4-piece version instead of a 1991 expanded band version of "Old Love". Marketing for the Definitive set says it includes previously released versions of "Pretending", though the outro solo matches neither the CD or the February 18th show, "Wonderful Tonight", though it does not match either the CD or the DVD, and "No Alibis" from a CD single, though it does not match the February 18th show.

== Track listing (CD) ==
=== Disc one ===
| No. | Title | Writer(s) | Recording Date | Length |
|---|---|---|---|---|
| 1. | "Badge" | Eric Clapton/George Harrison | 10 Feb 1991 | 6:51 |
| 2. | "Running on Faith" | Jerry Lynn Williams | 24 Jan 1990 | 6:49 |
| 3. | "White Room" | Jack Bruce/Pete Brown | 24 Jan 1990 | 6:10 |
| 4. | "Sunshine of Your Love" | Bruce/Brown/Clapton | 24 Jan 1990 | 9:11 |
| 5. | "Watch Yourself" | Buddy Guy | 5 Feb 1990 | 5:39 |
| 6. | "Have You Ever Loved a Woman" | Billy Myles | 5 Feb 1990 | 6:52 |
| 7. | "Worried Life Blues" | Big Maceo Merriweather | 5 Feb 1990 | 5:28 |
| 8. | "Hoodoo Man" | Amos "Junior" Wells | 28 Feb 1991 | 5:41 |

=== Disc two ===
| No. | Title | Writer(s) | Recording Date | Length |
|---|---|---|---|---|
| 1. | "Pretending" | Jerry Lynn Williams | 18 Feb 1991 (outro solo at 5:22 overdubbed from 15 Feb 1991) | 7:08 |
| 2. | "Bad Love" | Clapton/Mick Jones | 18 Feb 1991 | 6:25 |
| 3. | "Old Love" | Clapton/Robert Cray | 19 Feb 1991 | 13:01 |
| 4. | "Wonderful Tonight" | Clapton | 14 Feb 1991 | 9:11 |
| 5. | "Bell Bottom Blues" | Clapton/Bobby Whitlock | 9 Feb 1990 | 6:39 |
| 6. | "Hard Times" | Ray Charles | 9 Feb 1990 | 3:45 |
| 7. | "Edge of Darkness" | Clapton/Michael Kamen | 8 Mar 1991 | 6:30 |

== Track listing (DVD) ==
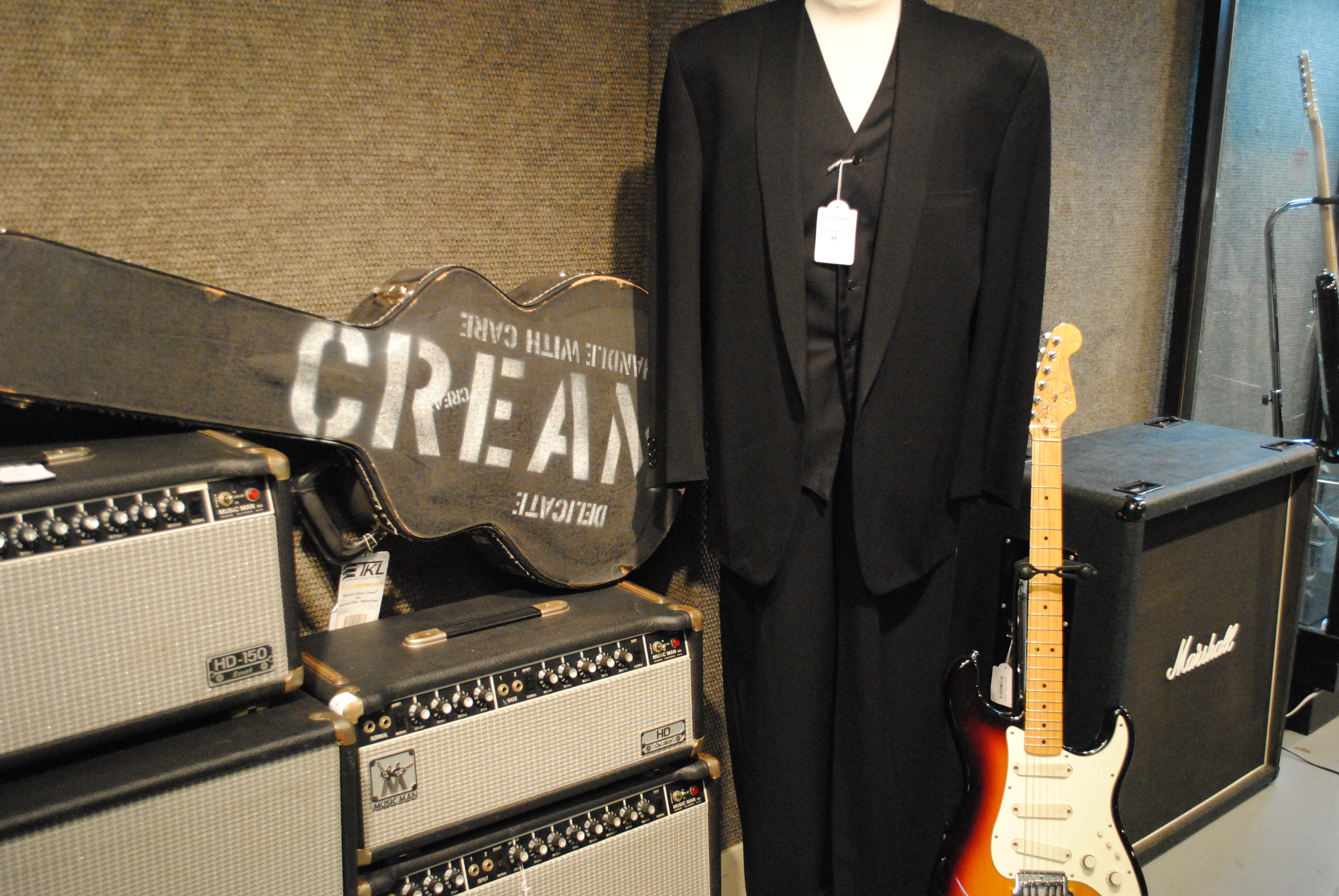
Clapton wore this custom-made Versace suit for the recording sessions in 1991.

| No. | Title | Recording Date | Length |
|---|---|---|---|
| 1. | "Running on Faith" | 24 Jan 1990 | 7:05 |
| 2. | "White Room" | 24 Jan 1990 | 5:58 |
| 3. | "Sunshine of Your Love" | 24 Jan 1990 | 7:27 |
| 4. | "Watch Yourself" | 5 Feb 1990 | 5:12 |
| 5. | "Have You Ever Loved A Woman" | 5 Feb 1990 | 6:44 |
| 6. | "Worried Life Blues" | 5 Feb 1990 | 5:18 |
| 7. | "Pretending" | 18 Feb 1991 | 6:49 |
| 8. | "Bad Love" | 18 Feb 1991 | 6:08 |
| 9. | "Old Love" | 18 Feb 1991 | 12:30 |
| 10. | "Wonderful Tonight" | 18 Feb 1991 | 9:17 |
| 11. | "Bell Bottom Blues" | 9 Feb 1990 | 6:39 |
| 12. | "Hard Times" | 9 Feb 1990 | 3:38 |
| 13. | "Edge of Darkness" | 9 Feb 1990 | 7:18 |

== The Definitive 24 Nights (2023) ==
=== Disc one: Rock ===
| No. | Title | Writer(s) | Recording Date | Length |
|---|---|---|---|---|
| 1. | "Pretending" | Jerry Lynn Williams | 18 Feb 1991 (outro solo overdubbed) | 6:47 |
| 2. | "Running on Faith" | Jerry Lynn Williams | 24 Jan 1990 | 7:09 |
| 3. | "Breaking Point" | Jerry Lynn Williams/Marty Grebb | 1 Feb 1990 | 6:22 |
| 4. | "I Shot the Sheriff" | Bob Marley | 6 Feb 1991 | 8:01 |
| 5. | "White Room" | Jack Bruce/Pete Brown | 24 Jan 1990 | 6:01 |
| 6. | "Can't Find My Way Home" | Steve Winwood | 18 Feb 1991 | 7:01 |
| 7. | "Bad Love" | Clapton/Mick Jones | 18 Feb 1991 | 6:17 |
| 8. | "Before You Accuse Me" | Ellas McDaniel | 1 Feb 1990 | 6:25 |
| 9. | "Lay Down Sally" | Clapton/George Terry/Marcy Levy | 24 Jan 1990 | 8:05 |

=== Disc two: Rock ===
| No. | Title | Writer(s) | Recording Date | Length |
|---|---|---|---|---|
| 1. | "Knockin' On Heaven's Door" | Bob Dylan | 6 Feb 1991 | 6:11 |
| 2. | "Old Love" | Clapton/Robert Cray | 24 Jan 1990 | 8:58 |
| 3. | "No Alibis" | Williams | 15 Feb 1991 | 6:39 |
| 4. | "Tearing Us Apart" | Clapton/Greg Phillinganes | 1 Feb 1990 | 7:01 |
| 5. | "Cocaine" | J.J. Cale | 1 Feb 1990 | 6:34 |
| 6. | "Wonderful Tonight" | Clapton | 15 Feb 1991 | 8:59 |
| 7. | "Layla" | Clapton/Jim Gordon | 18 Feb 1991 | 8:08 |
| 8. | "Crossroads" | Robert Johnson | 18 Feb 1991 | 8:55 |
| 9. | "Sunshine of Your Love" | Bruce/Brown/Clapton | 18 Feb 1991 | 11:26 |

Note: the digital release combines the Rock discs, renumbering disc two 10-18

=== Disc three: Blues ===
Featuring Buddy Guy on Everything's Gonna Be Alright and Something On Your Mind

| No. | Title | Writer(s) | Recording Date | Length |
|---|---|---|---|---|
| 1. | "Key to the Highway" | Charles Segar/William Broonzy | 5 Feb 1990 | 6:32 |
| 2. | "Worried Life Blues" | Big Maceo Merriweather | 5 Feb 1990 | 5:24 |
| 3. | "You Better Watch Yourself" | Walter Jacobs | 5 Feb 1990 | 5:12 |
| 4. | "Have You Ever Loved a Woman" | Billy Myles | 5 Feb 1990 | 6:57 |
| 5. | "Everything's Gonna Be Alright" | Walter Jacobs | 5 Feb 1990 | 7:23 |
| 6. | "Something On Your Mind" | Cecil James McNeely | 5 Feb 1990 | 6:12 |
| 7. | "All Your Love (I Miss Loving)" | Otis Rush | 28 Feb 1991 | 6:18 |

=== Disc four: Blues ===
Featuring Johnnie Johnson on Johnnie's Boogie, Albert Collins on Black Cat Bone, Robert Cray on Reconsider Baby, and Buddy Guy on My Time After A While

| No. | Title | Writer(s) | Recording Date | Length |
|---|---|---|---|---|
| 1. | "It's My Life Baby" | Don Robey/Ferdinand Washington | 28 Feb 1991 | 6:54 |
| 2. | "Johnnie's Boogie" | Johnnie Johnson | 28 Feb 1991 | 2:48 |
| 3. | "Black Cat Bone" | Sam Hopkins | 28 Feb 1991 | 4:59 |
| 4. | "Reconsider Baby" | Lowell Fulson | 28 Feb 1991 | 10:50 |
| 5. | "My Time After a While" | Bob Geddins/Ron Badger | 28 Feb 1991 | 10:54 |
| 6. | "Sweet Home Chicago" | Robert Johnson | 28 Feb 1991 | 5:23 |
| 7. | "You Better Watch Yourself (Reprise)" | Walter Jacobs | 28 Feb 1991 | 3:03 |

Note: the digital release combines the Blues discs, renumbering disc four 8-14

=== Disc five: Orchestral ===
Featuring the National Philharmonic Orchestra conducted by Michael Kamen

| No. | Title | Writer(s) | Recording Date | Length |
|---|---|---|---|---|
| 1. | "Crossroads" | Robert Johnson | 8 Mar 1991 | 9:57 |
| 2. | "Bell Bottom Blues" | Clapton/Bobby Whitlock | 9 Feb 1990 | 6:01 |
| 3. | "Lay Down Sally" | Clapton/George Terry/Marcy Levy | 9 Feb 1990 | 5:51 |
| 4. | "Holy Mother" | Clapton/Stephen Bishop | 8 Mar 1991 | 5:24 |
| 5. | "I Shot the Sheriff" | Bob Marley | 8 Mar 1991 | 8:12 |
| 6. | "Hard Times" | Ray Charles | 9 Feb 1990 | 3:52 |
| 7. | "Can't Find My Way Home" | Steve Winwood | 8 Mar 1991 | 6:59 |
| 8. | "Edge of Darkness" | Clapton/Michael Kamen | 8 Mar 1991 | 6:15 |
| 9. | "Old Love" | Clapton/Robert Cray | 8 Mar 1991 | 9:18 |

=== Disc six: Orchestral ===
| No. | Title | Writer(s) | Recording Date | Length |
|---|---|---|---|---|
| 1. | "Wonderful Tonight" | Clapton | 9 Feb 1990 | 9:22 |
| 2. | "White Room" | Jack Bruce/Pete Brown | 8 Mar 1991 | 5:58 |
| 3. | "Concerto for Electric Guitar" | Kamen | 8 Mar 1991 | 28:57 |
| 4. | "A Remark You Made" | Josef Zawinul | 8 Mar 1991 | 1:40 |
| 5. | "Layla" | Clapton/Jim Gordon | 8 Mar 1991 | 8:18 |
| 6. | "Sunshine of Your Love" | Bruce/Brown/Clapton | 8 Mar 1991 | 8:43 |

Note: the digital release combines the Orchestral discs, renumbering disc six 10-15

== Charts ==
=== Weekly charts ===
Chart performance for 24 Nights
| Chart (1991–2014) | Peak position |
|---|---|
| Australian Albums (ARIA) | 49 |
| Australian Music DVD (ARIA) | 34 |
| Danish Music DVD (Hitlisten) | 2 |
| Dutch Albums (Album Top 100) | 36 |
| German Albums (Offizielle Top 100) | 48 |
| Italian Music DVD (FIMI) | 13 |
| Japanese Albums (Oricon) | 29 |
| New Zealand Albums (RMNZ) | 49 |
| Swiss Albums (Schweizer Hitparade) | 19 |
| UK Albums (Official Charts) | 17 |
| US Billboard 200 | 38 |
| US Top Music Videos (Billboard) | 5 |

Chart performance for The Definitive 24 Nights
| Chart (2023) | Peak position |
|---|---|
| Belgian Albums (Ultratop Wallonia) | 187 |
| German Albums (Offizielle Top 100) | 30 |
| Scottish Albums (Official Charts) | 64 |
| Spanish Albums (Promusicae) | 31 |
| Swiss Albums (Schweizer Hitparade) | 27 |
| UK Album Downloads (Official Charts) | 59 |

Chart performance for 24 Nights: Rock
| Chart (2023) | Peak position |
|---|---|
| Belgian Albums (Ultratop Wallonia) | 146 |
| German Albums (Offizielle Top 100) | 16 |
| Swiss Albums (Schweizer Hitparade) | 60 |
| Scottish Albums (OCC) | 43 |

Chart performance for 24 Nights: Blues
| Chart (2023) | Peak position |
|---|---|
| Belgian Albums (Ultratop Wallonia) | 131 |
| German Albums (Offizielle Top 100) | 25 |
| Spanish Albums (Promusicae) | 82 |
| Swiss Albums (Schweizer Hitparade) | 52 |
| Scottish Albums (OCC) | 58 |

Chart performance for 24 Nights: Orchestral
| Chart (2023) | Peak position |
|---|---|
| Belgian Albums (Ultratop Wallonia) | 159 |
| German Albums (Offizielle Top 100) | 31 |
| Hungarian Albums (MAHASZ) | 40 |
| Scottish Albums (OCC) | 47 |
| Swiss Albums (Schweizer Hitparade) | 99 |

== Certifications ==
=== Album ===
Certifications for 24 Nights album
| Region | Certification | Certified units/sales |
|---|---|---|
| Brazil (Pro-Música Brasil) | Gold | 100,000^{*} |
| Mexico (AMPROFON) | Gold | 100,000^{^} |
| United Kingdom (BPI) | Gold | 100,000^{^} |
| United States (RIAA) | Gold | 500,000^{^} |
^{*} Sales figures based on certification alone.^{^} Shipments figures based on certification alone.

=== Video ===
Certifications for 24 Nights video
| Region | Certification | Certified units/sales |
|---|---|---|
| Australia (ARIA) | Platinum | 15,000^{^} |
| Canada (Music Canada) | Platinum | 10,000^{^} |
| United States (RIAA) | Gold | 50,000^{^} |
^{^} Shipments figures based on certification alone.
