= Somebody's Knockin' on My Door =

Song by Eric Clapton

from the album Slowhand at 70
- Released: November 13, 2015
- Recorded: May 21, 2015
- Length: 7:08
- Label: Eagle Rock
- Songwriter(s): JJ Cale
- Producer(s): Audrey Davenport

"Somebody's Knockin' on My Door", or sometimes just "Somebody's Knockin'", not to be confused with Somebody's Knockin' by Terri Gibbs, is a song written by the American recording artist J. J. Cale he never released.

In 2014, when English musician Eric Clapton did the album called The Breeze, a tribute to J. J. Cale who had died the previous year, he met up with his wife, Christine, and asked her, "Is there anything lying about that I could maybe finish or work with?". She gave him two CDs of unreleased material which Clapton found "all fantastic" and covered "Somebody’s Knockin" as the set opener for his 2015 Slowhand at 70 concert film and live album. Billboard called the Clapton take "rollicking" and The Telegraph thinks the song allows Clapton to play "handsome solos" between the lead vocal parts.

In 2016, Clapton released a studio version of the song on his album I Still Do.
