= Little Man, You've Had a Busy Day =

Song by Elsie Carlisle
- Released: 1934
- Genre: Classical · Modern · Vocal
- Length: 3:15
- Label: Decca
- Songwriter: Wayne · Hoffman · Sigler

"Little Man, You've Had a Busy Day" or "Little Man (You've Had a Busy Day)" is a modern vocal music song, with music by Mabel Wayne, and words by Al Hoffman and Maurice Sigler. It has been recorded by multiple artists from various musical genres.

The song is a lullaby both in theme and mood. It was first recorded by Elsie Carlisle with orchestral accompaniment on May 18, 1934 and released for Decca Records (F. 3990) in 1934. "Little Man, You've Had a Busy Day" became a hit song as it was covered by four major artists the same year. These cover versions were by artists including Emil Coleman, Isham Jones, Paul Robeson, Al Bowlly with the Ray Noble Orchestra and the Pickens Sisters, who made the song popular in the United States.
The song was later covered by Perry Como (1958), Sarah Vaughan and Count Basie (1961), Dakota Staton (1972), Monica Borrfors (1994) as well as Connee Boswell and Art Tatum. Bing Crosby recorded the song in 1956 for use on his radio show and it was subsequently included in the box set The Bing Crosby CBS Radio Recordings (1954-56) issued by Mosaic Records (catalog MD7-245) in 2009.

In 2016, the British blues musician Eric Clapton released his take on the song for his twenty-second studio album I Still Do and brought the song to new young generation and into a completely different musical genre.
