= Journeyman (album) =

Studio album by Eric Clapton
- Released: 6 November 1989
- Recorded: 1989
- Studios: Power Station, New York City; Skyline, New York City; Townhouse, London
- Genres: Rock, blues rock
- Length: 56:59
- Label: Duck / Reprise
- Producer: Russ Titelman

Eric Clapton chronology
Crossroads (1988)	Journeyman (1989)	24 Nights (1991)

Singles from Journeyman
- 1. "Pretending" Released: November 1989 (US); 2. "Running on Faith" Released: 1989 (Germany); 3. "Bad Love" Released: January 1990 (UK); 4. "No Alibis" Released: March 1990

Journeyman is the eleventh solo studio album by Eric Clapton. Heralded as a return to form for Clapton, who had struggled with alcohol addiction and recently found sobriety, the album has a 1980s electronic sound, but it also includes blues songs like "Before You Accuse Me", "Running on Faith", and "Hard Times." "Bad Love" was released as a single, reaching the No. 1 position on the Album Rock Chart in the United States, and being awarded a Grammy Award for Best Male Rock Vocal Performance in 1990. "Pretending" had also reached the No. 1 position on the Album Rock Chart the previous year, remaining at the top for five weeks ("Bad Love" had only stayed for three weeks).

The album reached number 2 on the UK Albums Chart and 16 on the US Billboard 200 chart, and it went on to become double platinum in the US. Clapton has said Journeyman is one of his favourite albums.

An expanded Journeyman: Deluxe Edition, with four bonus tracks, was released on November 21, 2025, on vinyl, CD, and digitally.

== Critical reception ==
Professional ratings
Review scores
Source	Rating
AllMusic	4.5/5 stars
Chicago Tribune	2.5/4 stars
Christgau's Record Guide	B−
Classic Rock	4/5 stars
Encyclopedia of Popular Music	4/5 stars
The Great Rock Discography	7/10
Los Angeles Times	2.5/5 stars
MusicHound	3/5
Rolling Stone	4/5 stars
The Rolling Stone Album Guide	4/5 stars

Reviewing in December 1989 for The Village Voice, Robert Christgau gave the album a B-minus and wrote of Clapton, "What did you expect him to call it – Hack? Layla and 461 Ocean Boulevard were clearly flukes: he has no record-making knack. So he farms out the songs, sings them competently enough, and marks them with his guitar. Which sounds kind of like Mark Knopfler's." In a retrospective review for AllMusic, Stephen Thomas Erlewine praised the album for its "convincing" vocals and "consistently strong" songwriting.

== Track listing ==
No.	Title	Writer(s)	Length
1.	"Pretending"	Jerry Lynn Williams	4:48
2.	"Anything for Your Love"	Jerry Lynn Williams	4:16
3.	"Bad Love"	Eric Clapton, Mick Jones	5:11
4.	"Running on Faith"	Jerry Lynn Williams	5:27
5.	"Hard Times"	Ray Charles	3:00
6.	"Hound Dog"	Jerry Leiber, Mike Stoller	2:26
7.	"No Alibis"	Jerry Lynn Williams	5:32
8.	"Run So Far"	George Harrison	4:06
9.	"Old Love"	Eric Clapton, Robert Cray	6:25
10.	"Breaking Point"	Marty Grebb, Jerry Lynn Williams	5:37
11.	"Lead Me On"	Cecil Womack, Linda Womack	5:52
12.	"Before You Accuse Me"	Ellas McDaniel	3:55

== Outtakes ==
1. "Forever" - Unissued
2. "Don't Turn Your Back" - Unissued
3. "Something About You" - Unissued

== Personnel ==
=== Musicians ===
Track numbers refer to CD and digital releases of the album.

- Eric Clapton – lead vocals, guitar
- Jeff Bova – synth horns (1), synth organ (1), synthesizer programming (2, 10), drum programming (10), sequenced bass (10), sequenced organ (10)
- Alan Clark – synth horns (1), Hammond organ (1, 4), sequenced bass (1), keyboards (3), synthesizers (8), synth strings (9)
- Greg Phillinganes – acoustic piano (1, 4, 5), keyboards (2, 7, 10), backing vocals (4, 7), synthesizers (8)
- Richard Tee – acoustic piano (2, 6, 7, 9, 12), Fender Rhodes (11)
- Robbie Kondor – keyboards (2), vocoder (2), bass harmonica (2), drum programming (2), synthesizers (6, 12), synthesizer programming (7, 8), synth piano (9)
- Rob Mounsey – synthesizers (8)
- Robbie Kilgore – synthesizers (11)
- Jerry Lynn Williams – guitar (1), backing and harmony vocals (1)
- Robert Cray – guitar (2, 6, 9, 12), guitar solo (9, 12)
- Phil Palmer – guitar (3)
- John Tropea – rhythm guitar (5)
- George Harrison – guitar (8), harmony vocals (8)
- Cecil Womack – acoustic guitar (11), backing vocals (11)
- Nathan East – bass guitar (1, 2, 4–7, 9–12), backing vocals (1, 4, 7)
- Pino Palladino – bass guitar (3)
- Darryl Jones – bass guitar (8)
- Jimmy Bralower – drum programming (1, 7, 8)
- Jim Keltner – drums (2, 6, 8–10, 12), percussion (6), programming (8, 10) tambourine (9)
- Phil Collins – drums (3), backing and harmony vocals (3)
- Steve Ferrone – drums (4, 5, 11), hi-hat (10)
- Carol Steele – congas (1), tambourine (4), percussion (7, 10, 11)
- Gary Burton – vibraphone (9)
- Hank Crawford – alto saxophone (5)
- David Sanborn – alto saxophone (10)
- Ronnie Cuber – baritone saxophone (5)
- David "Fathead" Newman – tenor saxophone (5)
- Jon Faddis – trumpet (5)
- Lew Soloff – trumpet (5)
- Arif Mardin – horn arrangements (5), string arrangements (11)
- Chaka Khan – backing vocals (1, 7)
- Katie Kissoon – backing vocals (3)
- Tessa Niles – backing vocals (3)
- Lani Groves – backing vocals (4, 7)
- Rev. Timothy Wright Washington Temple Concert Choir – choir (4)
- Roger Forrester and Friends – dog barking (6)
- Daryl Hall – harmony vocals (7)
- Tawatha Agee – backing vocals (10)
- Vaneese Thomas – backing vocals (10)
- Linda Womack – backing vocals (11)

=== Production ===
- Produced by Russ Titelman
- Engineered by Steve "Barney" Chase, Dave O'Donnell, Jack Joseph Puig and Dave Wittman.
- Assistant Engineers – Richard Arnold, Paul Angelli, Mike Knowles and U.E. Natasi.
- Additional engineering by Larry Alexander, Ben Fowler, Michael O'Reilly and Steve Rinkoff.
- Recorded at The Power Station (NYC), Skyline Studios (NYC) and The Town House (London).
- Mixing – Rob Eaton (tracks 1, 2, 4, 8); Gary Wright and Russ Titelman (tracks 3, 6, 7, 9–12); Steve Chase (track 5).
- Recording and Mix Assistant – Ben Fowler
- Mixed at The Power Station and The Town House.
- Mastered by Ted Jensen at Sterling Sound, NYC.
- Production Coordination – Jill Dell'Abate
- Production Assistant – Alexandra Saraspe Conomos
- Design – Bill Smith Studio
- Original Design Concept – Eric Clapton
- Photography – Terry O'Neill
- Management, 'Road' Photography – Roger Forrester

== Charts ==
=== Weekly charts ===
Chart (1989–1990)	Peak position
Australian Albums (ARIA)	27
Austrian Albums (Ö3 Austria)	29
Canada Top Albums/CDs (RPM)	7
Danish Albums (Hitlisten)	10
Dutch Albums (Album Top 100)	9
European Albums (IFPI)	6
Finnish Albums (Suomen virallinen lista)	3
German Albums (Offizielle Top 100)	16
Italian Albums (Musica e Dischi)	11
Japanese Albums (Oricon)	21
New Zealand Albums (RMNZ)	43
Norwegian Albums (VG-lista)	2
Swedish Albums (Sverigetopplistan)	3
Swiss Albums (Schweizer Hitparade)	7
UK Albums (Official Charts)	2
US Billboard 200	16

=== Year-end charts ===
Chart (1990)	Position
Austrian Albums (Ö3 Austria)	147
Canada Top Albums/CDs (RPM)	48
European Albums (IFPI)	30
German Albums (Offizielle Top 100)	42
Norwegian Albums (VG-lista)	8
Swiss Albums (Schweizer Hitparade)	58
US Billboard 200	24

== Certifications ==
Region	Certification	Certified units/sales
Argentina (CAPIF)	Gold	30,000^{^}
Australia (ARIA)	Gold	35,000^{^}
Canada (Music Canada)	Platinum	100,000^{^}
France (SNEP)	Gold	100,000^{*}
Japan (RIAJ)	Gold	100,000^{^}
Netherlands (NVPI)	Gold	50,000^{^}
New Zealand (RMNZ)	Gold	7,500^{^}
Spain (Promusicae)	Gold	50,000^{^}
Sweden (GLF)	Gold	50,000^{^}
Switzerland (IFPI Switzerland)	Gold	25,000^{^}
United Kingdom (BPI)	Platinum	300,000^{^}
United States (RIAA)	2× Platinum	2,000,000^{^}
^{*} Sales figures based on certification alone.^{^} Shipments figures based on certification alone.
