= (I) Get Lost =

Single by Eric Clapton

from the album The Story of Us: Music from the Motion Picture
- Released: 23 November 1999
- Genre: Pop
- Length: 4:20
- Label: Reprise
- Songwriter: Eric Clapton
- Producer: Eric Clapton · Simon Climie

Eric Clapton singles chronology
"Blue Eyes Blue" (1999)	"(I) Get Lost" (1999)	"Come Rain or Come Shine" (2000)

"(I) Get Lost" is a pop song written and recorded by the British rock musician Eric Clapton. The title was released as both a single on 23 November 1999 for Reprise Records and is featured as part of the compilation album Clapton Chronicles: The Best of Eric Clapton, which was released on 12 October 1999. It was written for the movie The Story of Us.

== Composition ==
The track was written during a period Clapton experimented with minimalistic guitar riffs and Pro Tools along with his collaborator Simon Climie, while being in the recording sessions for the 1998 Pilgrim studio album. "(I) Get Lost" starts with a guitar line that featured Clapton playing an acoustic guitar with nylon strings. As the song evolves, percussions, strings and synthesizers come into action. The recording was produced by Simon Climie and Clapton himself. The song starts out in a key of A major. The song's lyrics tell the story of a man, who is longing for his either his girlfriend or lifelong love and feels himself lost in tears and apprehensibility.

== Release ==
The song was originally written and recorded as part of the movie soundtrack to the 1999 film The Story of Us, where the song was featured along with the "Main Title" (also composed by Clapton for the movie) in the very beginning. It was later released with the soundtrack compact disc under Reprise Records. The pop title was also released as a compact disc and vinyl single on 23 November 1999. In Germany, the single was re-released in 2000. Besides being released in Europe and the United States, the CD single was also made available in Japan and Mexico.

== Reception ==
Music critic Dan Goldwasser of Soundtrack.NET calls the song an "upbeat song" which "immediately grabs the listener". Additionally, the "(I) Get Lost" has got an important part of making the movie soundtrack The Story of Us a "relaxing score". The music website AllMusic rates the single release with one and a half of five possible stars. Billboard magazine's Chuck Taylor thinks, "you will be speechless" after hearing the single, because the release is an "absolutely enchanting and bold effort by this timeless artist to step to the late–1990s plate instead of letting reflective ballads redefine his image as an aging AC balladier". Taylor goes on in his review for the music magazine, stating: "Every element of this song shines, from its light but intelligent lyric about being lost without the one he loves (though, at the same time implicationg her as less than the perfect mate) to an overwhelmingly catchy chorus. But it's the production that will elevate 'Lost' above the pop patter out there, with its dignified demeanor wrapped in a toe-tapping vibe that will delight the nation. Even the die-hards who look back to his simpler rock days will find an appreciation in this ditty, a sure step forward for an artist who demands to be noticed by the mainstream this time around. This is surprising, great fun and a sure-fire hit".

== Chart positions ==
=== Weekly charts ===
Chart (1999–2000)	Peak position
Finland (Suomen virallinen lista)	12
Germany (GfK)	83
Japan (Oricon Hot 100 Singles)	32
Japan (Oricon International Singles)	23
Portugal (AFP)	6
US Dance Club Songs (Billboard)	8
US Maxi Single Sales (Billboard)	1
