= Give Me Strength =

Song by Eric Clapton

from the album 461 Ocean Boulevard
- A-side: "I Shot the Sheriff"
- Released: July 1974
- Genre: Blues · Pop
- Length: 2:51
- Label: RSO
- Songwriter(s): Eric Clapton
- Producer(s): Tom Dowd

"Give Me Strength" is a blues pop song, written and recorded by the British rock musician Eric Clapton for his 1974 hit studio album 461 Ocean Boulevard under RSO Records. However, the song gained more popularity, when the record company released the song as the B-side to Clapton's number-one single "I Shot the Sheriff", before the studio effort was released. It was released as a seven-inch gramophone record.

== Composition ==
According to the music website AllMusic, the title is written in a blues, rock and pop music vein. It features styles of album rock, hard rock, modern blues, blues rock, contemporary pop rock as well as adult contemporary music. The song is written in the key of E major and features a chord progression consisting of mostly major-chords as well as seventh chords. Only one minor chord, in this case an A minor chord was used in the song.
