= 461 Ocean Boulevard =

Studio album by Eric Clapton
- Released: July 1974
- Recorded: April–May 1974
- Studios: Criteria in Miami, Florida
- Genres: Blues rock; funk
- Length: 39:14
- Label: RSO
- Producer: Tom Dowd

Eric Clapton chronology
Eric Clapton's Rainbow Concert (1973)	461 Ocean Boulevard (1974)	There's One in Every Crowd (1975)

Singles from 461 Ocean Boulevard
- 1. "I Shot the Sheriff" Released: July 1974; 2. "Willie and the Hand Jive" Released: October 1974

461 Ocean Boulevard is the second solo studio album by English musician Eric Clapton. It was released in late July 1974 by RSO Records, after the record company released the hit single "I Shot the Sheriff" earlier in the month. The album topped various international charts and sold more than two million copies.

The album was Clapton's return to the recording studio after a three-year hiatus due to his heroin addiction. The title refers to the address on Ocean Boulevard in Golden Beach, Florida, where Clapton lived while recording the album. Upon completing the album, Clapton and RSO head Robert Stigwood recommended the house and Criteria Studios in Miami to fellow RSO artists the Bee Gees, who then moved there to write and record Main Course. The street address of the house was changed after the album's release (though many sources claim that that's a false urban legend based on property registries that indicate no change in numbering whatsoever).

A remastered two-disc deluxe edition of the album was released in 2004, which included selections from two live shows at the Hammersmith Odeon, and additional studio jam sessions.

== Production ==
After overcoming his heroin addiction, Eric Clapton realized that he had wasted three years of his life, stating he had not done anything other than watch television and get out of shape. When Clapton sought help working on a farm, he began to listen to a lot of new music and old blues records he had brought with him and started to play again, even writing whole songs out of simple ideas. With these song ideas in mind, Clapton was given a demo tape by Carl Radle, the former bassist for Derek and the Dominos, with songs performed by Radle with keyboardist Dick Sims and drummer Jamie Oldaker. Clapton liked the recordings, calling them "simply superb".

Clapton was given time to write new material for a next album by Radle. When Clapton set to work on tracks for the upcoming studio release, he wanted to leave his songs as incomplete as possible, so that the musicians who were going to record with Clapton in the studio, would get the chance to make them their own. After Clapton appeared in the rock opera Tommy, his manager at the time, Robert Stigwood, contacted him about a new project. Stigwood arranged for Clapton to record at the Criteria Studios in Miami, Florida, with Radle, Sims, Oldaker and record producer Tom Dowd. When the time came to record the new album, Clapton was worried about both its commercial and artistic success, noting his concept of a new album would work only when there was chemistry between the musicians. Clapton also hired guest vocalist Yvonne Elliman and guitarist George Terry as full-time members of his group.

Stigwood also paid for Clapton to live at a rental house at 461 Ocean Boulevard in the town of Golden Beach near Miami. The whole album was recorded from April to May 1974. For the recording sessions, Clapton used his Fender Stratocaster electric guitar nicknamed 'Blackie' . For slide guitar work, Clapton used several Gibson ES-335 guitars. He also played vintage Martin acoustic guitars.

== Music and lyrics ==
Ryan Book of Music Times felt the music on the album ranges from "bright blues rock" to sentimental ballads like "Let It Grow"and Robert Christgau said it features "sleepy postjunk funk" with intimations of sex.

In his 2007 autobiography My Life, Clapton recalls that he was very pleased with the song's lyrics and instrumental parts of "Let It Grow", which he had written himself, although music critics and also Clapton noted, that the melody and chord progression is nearly the same as Led Zeppelin's "Stairway to Heaven". Except for "Let It Grow", "Get Ready", (a song Clapton wrote with guest vocalist Yvonne Elliman about her) and “Give Me Strength”, the album consists of various cover versions of titles that had been in Clapton's head for a long time: "Willie and the Hand Jive", "Steady Rollin' Man" and "I Can't Hold Out".

While the band was recording, George Terry brought the album Burnin' from Bob Marley and the Wailers to Clapton's attention, stating he really liked the song "I Shot the Sheriff". He persuaded Clapton to record a version of this, which Clapton was reluctant of due to not wanting to disrespect the original. Finally, the band convinced Clapton to put the song on the album, noting it would definitely become a hit single. When Clapton met Bob Marley years after his take on the tune was released, Marley told Clapton he really liked the cover. The album finishes with Terry's "Mainline Florida", which "breaks away from the established tone of the record" and features Clapton combining slide guitar with a talk box.

== Marketing and sales ==
461 Ocean Boulevard was released in July 1974 on vinyl and compact music cassette in the Americas, Europe, Asia, Australia and New Zealand. RSO Records decided to release the album in territories, where it might chart and sell a lot of copies; it was released in Argentina, Australia, Austria, Brazil, Canada, Denmark, France, Germany, Greece, India, Ireland, Italy, Japan, Mexico, the Netherlands, New Zealand, Norway, Portugal, Russia, Spain, Sweden, Taiwan, the United Kingdom, the United States, Uruguay, Yugoslavia and Venezuela. Therefore, it was one of the few pop music albums to be legally sold in the USSR. Over the years, the album was reissued several times including in 1988, 1996 and 2004 for reunited Europe, also in compact disc format and via digital music download.

461 Ocean Boulevard is one of Clapton's most successful commercial releases, reaching the Top 10 in eight countries, and peaking at number one in three territories including Canada and the United States. The album reached the Top 5 in the United Kingdom, peaking at number three. In the Netherlands and Norway, the 1974 studio release reached number four on the national album charts. In Germany and New Zealand, the album reached eleven and thirty-eight respectively. On the 1974 year-end charts, the studio album reached number five on the Canadian RPM chart and in the Netherlands, the album was ranked at number twenty-two. In the United States, the release was certified with a Gold disc for shipment figures of more than 500,000 copies.

Two singles were released; the first, "I Shot the Sheriff", was released by RSO Records in early July 1974, before the album was released. Clapton's take on the Marley tune outplayed the original version, reaching the Top 10 single charts in nine countries, becoming Clapton's only number one hit on the Billboard Hot 100 chart. In 2003, Clapton's version was inducted into the Grammy Hall of Fame. The single was also Clapton's first single to sell well internationally, achieving Gold certifications in the United States as well as a double Platinum award in Canada. The second track to be released as a single was "Willie and the Hand Jive", which came out in October 1974. Clapton slowed down the tempo for his version. Author Chris Welch believes that the song benefits from this "slow burn". However, Rolling Stone critic Ken Emerson complains that the song sounds "disconcertingly mournful". Other critics praised Clapton's confident vocals. Author Marc Roberty claimed that on this song, "Clapton's vocals had clearly matured, with fluctuations and intonations that were convincing rather than tentative as in the past". Clapton's version of the song was released as a single in 1974 and reached number 26 on the Billboard Hot 100 and position 28 in the Netherlands.

== Critical reception and legacy ==
Professional ratings
Review scores
Source	Rating
AllMusic	4.5/5 stars
Chicago Tribune	4/4 stars
Christgau's Record Guide	A
Creem	A–
The Encyclopedia of Popular Music	4/5 stars
MusicHound Rock	3.5/5 stars
The Rolling Stone Album Guide	5/5 stars
Uncut	4/5 stars
Tom Hull	C

Reviewing for Creem in September 1974, Robert Christgau said: "As unlikely as it seems, Clapton has taken being laid-back into a new dimension. Perhaps the most brilliant exploration of the metaphorical capacities of country blues ever attempted, way better than Taj Mahal for all of side one. On side two, unfortunately, he goes a little soft. But I'll settle for two questionable live albums if he'll give us a solo record as good as this every three years." He later expanded on this praise in Christgau's Record Guide: Rock Albums of the Seventies (1981):

By opening the first side with 'Motherless Children' and closing it with 'I Shot the Sheriff', Clapton puts the rural repose of his laid-back-with-Leon music into a context of deprivation and conflict, adding bite to soft-spoken professions of need and faith that might otherwise smell faintly of the most rural of laid-back commodities, bullshit. And his honesty has its reward: better sex. The casual assurance you can hear now in his singing goes with the hip-twitching syncopation he brings to Robert Johnson's 'Steady Rolling Man' and Elmore James's [I Can't Hold Out', and though the covers are what make this record memorable it's on 'Get Ready', written and sung with Yvonne Elliman, that his voice takes on a mellow, seductive intimacy he's never come close to before.

In 1974, journalist Ken Emerson at Rolling Stone called Clapton's guitar work unnotable and criticized Clapton for hiding behind his other musicians, whom Emerson deemed less than capable. Emerson also questioned Clapton's decision to play a dobro on the album but called "Let It Grow" a highlight. Emerson considered Clapton's re-arrangement of "Motherless Children" to be too upbeat for a somber song.

In a retrospective review for AllMusic, critic Stephen Thomas Erlewine calls the studio album a "tighter, more focused outing that enables Clapton to stretch out instrumentally" and adds that the "pop concessions on the album [as well as] the sleek production [and] the concise running times don't detract from the rootsy origins of the material". Finishing his review, Erlewine notes, the 461 Ocean Boulevard "set the template for Clapton's 1970s albums". The critic awarded the release four and a half out of five possible stars. For the Blender magazine review of the album's 2004 deluxe edition, Jon Pareles called the Eric Clapton of the Cream-era superior to the Clapton of the 461 Ocean Boulevard-era, because of what Pareles describes as strained singing on 461 Ocean Boulevard. Pareles also described Clapton's remake of "I Shot the Sheriff" as a copy with no original arrangement; he also praised the song "Let It Grow" but criticized it for sounding too much like "Stairway to Heaven".

In a retrospective review for Uncut, Nigel Williamson considered that with 461 Ocean Boulevard, Clapton "rediscovered the primacy of music in his life". Critic Ryan Book from The Music Times likes the track listing very much and thinks that "the climate comes out in Clapton's work, ten tracks ranging from bright blues rock to, well, 'Let It Grow'." Eduardo Rivadavia at Ultimate Classic Rock calls the release a "watershed solo LP" and notes the popularity of the album, stating it is a "wanted man". The journalist finished his review by calling 461 Ocean Boulevard the album in which Clapton's "incomparable talents and this inspired song set were finally captured".

Rolling Stone placed the album at No. 411 on its 2012 list of the 500 Greatest Albums of All Time, commenting that Clapton had "returned from heroin addiction with a disc of mellow, springy grooves minus guitar histrionics", which "paid tribute to Robert Johnson and Elmore James". The album was included Robert Dimery's book 1001 Albums You Must Hear Before You Die.

== Track listing ==
Side one
No.	Title	Writer(s)	Length
1.	"Motherless Children"	Traditional (Arranged by Eric Clapton · Carl Radle)	4:55
2.	"Give Me Strength"	Clapton	2:51
3.	"Willie and the Hand Jive"	Johnny Otis	3:31
4.	"Get Ready"	Clapton · Yvonne Elliman	3:50
5.	"I Shot the Sheriff"	Bob Marley	4:30

Side two
No.	Title	Writer(s)	Length
1.	"I Can't Hold Out"	Willie Dixon (original album credit: "By Elmore James, Arranged by Clapton")	4:10
2.	"Please Be with Me"	Scott Boyer	3:25
3.	"Let It Grow"	Clapton	5:00
4.	"Steady Rollin' Man"	Robert Johnson (Arranged by Clapton)	3:14
5.	"Mainline Florida"	George Terry	4:05

Original compact disc release
No.	Title	Writer(s)	Length
1.	"Motherless Children"	Traditional (Arrangement by Clapton · Radle)	4:55
2.	"Better Make It Through Today" (from There's One in Every Crowd)	Clapton	4:07
3.	"Willie and the Hand Jive"	Otis	3:31
4.	"Get Ready"	Clapton · Elliman	3:47
5.	"I Shot the Sheriff"	Marley	4:25
6.	"I Can't Hold Out"	James	4:14
7.	"Please Be with Me"	Boyer	3:26
8.	"Let It Grow"	Clapton	5:00
9.	"Steady Rollin' Man"	Johnson	3:14
10.	"Mainline Florida"	Terry	4:09
11.	"Give Me Strength"	Louise King Mathews	2:54

=== Deluxe Edition ===
Disc one
No.	Title	Writer(s)	Length
1.	"Motherless Children"	Traditional (Arrangement by Clapton · Radle)	4:55
2.	"Give Me Strength"	Clapton	2:54
3.	"Willie and the Hand Jive"	Otis	3:31
4.	"Get Ready"	Clapton · Elliman	3:47
5.	"I Shot the Sheriff"	Marley	4:25
6.	"I Can't Hold Out"	James	4:14
7.	"Please Be with Me"	Boyer	3:26
8.	"Let It Grow"	Clapton	5:00
9.	"Steady Rollin' Man"	Johnson	3:14
10.	"Mainline Florida"	Terry	4:09
11.	"Walkin' Down the Road (Session Out-Take)"	Alan Musgrave · Paul Levine	5:17
12.	"Ain't That Loving You (Session Out-Take)"	Jimmy Reed	5:30
13.	"Meet Me (Down at the Bottom) (Session Out-Take)"	Willie Dixon	6:59
14.	"Eric After Hours Blues (Session Out-Take)"	Clapton	4:23
15.	"B Minor Jam (Session Out-Take)"	Clapton	7:11

Disc two — Live From the Hammersmith Odeon, London. December 4th and 5th, 1974
No.	Title	Writer(s)	Length
1.	"Smile"	Charlie Chaplin · Geoffrey Parsons · John Turner	4:39
2.	"Let It Grow"	Clapton	6:23
3.	"Can't Find My Way Home"	Steve Winwood	4:49
4.	"I Shot the Sheriff"	Marley	7:49
5.	"Tell the Truth"	Clapton · Bobby Whitlock	7:03
6.	"The Sky Is Crying / Have You Ever Loved a Woman / Rambling on My Mind"	James · Billy Myles · Johnson	7:23
7.	"Little Wing"	Jimi Hendrix	6:49
8.	"Singin' the Blues"	Don Robey · Joe Medwick Veasey	7:42
9.	"Badge"	Clapton · George Harrison	8:36
10.	"Layla"	Clapton · Jim Gordon	5:26
11.	"Let It Rain"	Clapton · Bonnie Bramlett	6:33

- 4th December - tracks 5, 7, 8, 10, 11. 5th December - tracks 1, 2, 3, 4, 6, 9.

== Personnel ==
=== Musicians ===
- Eric Clapton – lead vocals, guitars, Dobro (A2, B2, B3), slide guitar (A1, B1, B5)
- George Terry – guitars (A1–A5, B2, B3, B4, B5), backing vocals (A5, B2, B3, B4, B5), slide guitar (A1)
- Albhy Galuten – piano (A1, A5, B3, B4, B5), electric piano (A4), ARP synthesizer (B3), clavichord (B4)
- Dick Sims – organ (A1, A2, A3, A4, A5, B1, B3, B4, B5)
- Carl Radle – bass
- Jamie Oldaker – drums (all except A2, B2, B4), percussion (B2)
- Yvonne Elliman – backing vocals (A3, A5, B2, B3, B5), co-lead vocals (A4)
- Al Jackson Jr. – drums (A2)
- Jimmy Fox – drums (B4)
- Tom Bernfield – backing vocals (B3, B5)

=== Production ===
- Tom Dowd – producer
- Bill Levenson – compilation producer on Deluxe Edition
- Ron Fawcus – engineer
- Andy Knight – engineer
- Karl Richardson – engineer
- Suha Gur – mastering
- Darcy Proper – mastering at Sterling Sound (New York, NY).
- Bob Defrin – art direction, design
- David Gahr – photography
- Ryan Null – photo coordination

== Charts ==
=== Weekly charts ===
Chart (1974–1975)	Peak position
Australia (Kent Music Report)	2
Canadian Top Albums/CDs (RPM)	1
Dutch Albums (Album Top 100)	4
Finnish Albums (Suomen virallinen lista)	10
German Albums (Offizielle Top 100)	11
New Zealand Albums (RMNZ)	38
Norwegian Albums (VG-lista)	4
UK Albums (OCC)	3
US Billboard 200	1

=== Year-end charts ===
Chart (1974)	Position
Australia (Kent Music Report)	18
Canadian Top Albums/CDs (RPM)	5
Dutch Albums (MegaCharts)	22
German Albums (Offizielle Top 100)	50
US Billboard 200	88

== Certifications ==
Region	Certification	Certified units/sales
United States (RIAA)	Platinum	1,000,000^{^}
^{^} Shipments figures based on certification alone.
