= Before You Accuse Me =

Song written by Bo Diddley

Single by Bo Diddley
- A-side: "Say! Boss Man"
- Released: February 1958
- Recorded: August 15, 1957
- Genre: Rock and roll; rhythm and blues; country blues
- Length: 2:40
- Label: Checker
- Songwriter: Ellas McDaniel a.k.a. Bo Diddley
- Producer: Leonard Chess

Bo Diddley singles chronology
"Hey! Bo Diddley" (1957)	"Before You Accuse Me" (1958)	"Hush Your Mouth" (1958)

"Before You Accuse Me" (also known as "Before You Accuse Me (Take a Look at Yourself)") is a song written and recorded by American musician Bo Diddley in 1957. The song was originally released as the B-side to Diddley's "Say Bossman" and included on his eponymous debut album in 1958. Backing Diddley on vocal and guitar on the original recording were Jody Williams on guitar, Willie Dixon on bass, and Frank Kirkland on drums. The song has also been recorded by several other artists, such as Creedence Clearwater Revival and Eric Clapton.

== Renditions ==
=== Creedence Clearwater Revival ===
Creedence Clearwater Revival recorded "Before You Accuse Me" for their fifth studio album, Cosmo's Factory (1970). Lead singer John Fogerty contributed both guitar and piano parts for the song. Biographer Thomas M. Kitts commented on the song's lyrics:

The singer tries to deflect criticism off himself and back to his lover ... It is quite possible that Fogerty may have selected "Before You Accuse Me" to send a message to the band. Clearly. tension was mounting and expressions of dissatisfaction with Fogerty's leadership were escalating. "Before you accuse me," he might be suggesting, "look at yourself" and consider your prowess and your contributions to the band, musical and managerial.

=== Eric Clapton ===
Eric Clapton recorded "Before You Accuse Me" several times during his career. An electric version is included on his 1989 album Journeyman. It was used as the B-side for his best-selling single "Pretending" and reached number nine on the Billboard Hot Mainstream Rock Tracks chart in 1990.

In 1992, an acoustic version was included on his Unplugged album. Another acoustic version outtake, recorded during the sessions for Backless (1978), is included as the opening track on the Clapton compilation Blues (1999). He also performed "Before You Accuse Me" in concert, such as on June 30, 1990, at the Knebworth Festival.
