= Jerry Lynn Williams =

American singer and songwriter (1948–2005)

Background information
- Born: October 30, 1948; Dallas, Texas, U.S.
- Died: November 25, 2005 (aged 57) St. Maarten
- Genres: Rock; blues
- Occupations: Singer; songwriter

Jerry Lynn Williams (October 30, 1948 – November 25, 2005) was an American rock music singer and composer. He wrote such hits as "Forever Man", "See What Love Can Do", "Something's Happening", "Running on Faith" and "Pretending" for Eric Clapton.

== Life ==
Williams was born in Dallas, Texas.

== Discography ==
He contributed two songs, "Real Man" and "I Will Not Be Denied", to Bonnie Raitt's 1989 album Nick of Time. He had previously written material for Raitt's 1986 album Nine Lives. He also wrote songs for Robert Plant, B.B. King, Stevie Ray Vaughan and Jimmie Vaughan.

As a performer, he led the band High Mountain (later renamed The Jerry Williams Group), which released an album on Columbia Records in 1970. Solo, he released albums on Warner Bros. Records and CBS Records during the 1970s, and his break as a songwriter came when Delbert McClinton's cover of a song from his second album, "Givin' It Up for Your Love", reached the Top 40.

In his autobiography, Clapton recalled meeting Williams for the first time after his record label, Warner Bros. Records, sent him demos of "Forever Man", "See What Love Can Do" and "Something's Happening" as suggestions for an upcoming album, which turned out to be Behind the Sun in 1985. Clapton recalled that he "loved the way [Williams] sang". Music author Marc Roberty claims that Williams's writing "seemed to suit Eric's vocals perfectly".

Clapton said at the time:

Jerry Williams has been trying to get a break for himself for quite a while. And I just loved the demos that he sent me so much that I recorded all of them. I thought they were great. We tried to do the songs just like Jerry's demos because his demos are so strong. This man is really good. He's fantastic. And I can't emphasize that point enough. He really should put out his own album.

== Death ==
He died at age 57 from kidney and liver failure on his yacht on November 25, 2005, in St. Maarten, after suffering from liver cancer. At the time of his death he was insolvent due to a divorce settlement and a judgment related to litigation over the copyrights to several of the songs he wrote.
