= Pretending (Eric Clapton song) =

- Australian single cover

Single by Eric Clapton

from the album Journeyman
- B-side: "Before You Accuse Me" (US) "Hard Times" (UK)
- Released: November 1989 (US); June 1990 (UK)
- Genre: Rock
- Length: 4:48
- Label: Reprise Records
- Songwriter: Jerry Lynn Williams
- Producer: Russ Titelman

"Pretending" is a rock song written and composed by Jerry Lynn Williams. It was released in 1989 on Eric Clapton's Journeyman as the first track of the album. The song was released as the lead single from the album, backed with "Before You Accuse Me" in the US and Europe and "Hard Times" in UK, and reached #55 on the Billboard Hot 100, making it the album's highest-charting single. It was also #1 on the Hot Mainstream Rock Tracks chart. In the Netherlands, it reached #3 on the Dutch Tip 40 and #24 on the Dutch Top 40. It became a live favorite.

The song begins with a piano introduction. Clapton uses a wah wah pedal on the song. Author Marc Roberty describes the wah-wah solos as being "superlative." Roberty criticizes Steve Ferrone's drumming on the song for being too heavy handed. Allmusic critic Matthew Greenwald praises the song's "great guitar hook" and Clapton's "great vocal and guitar performances" on the song. However, Greenwald believes that the song's arrangement is overdone, particularly the "brassy synthesizers," and feels that the song dated quickly due to its pop music elements.

From the CD liner notes on Pretending: "Jimmy Bralower - Drum Programming" Steve Ferrone is not listed as drummer on the song.

== Music video ==
The music video features Clapton and his band playing in a dark rainy city at night. Clapton has stated in interviews that the idea was based on Akira Kurosawa's Seven Samurai.

== Credits ==
- Eric Clapton – lead vocals, guitar
- Jerry Lynn Williams – guitar, backing and harmony vocals
- Greg Phillinganes – acoustic piano
- Jeff Bova – synth organ, synth horns
- Alan Clark – Hammond organ, synth horns, sequenced bass
- Nathan East – bass guitar, backing vocals
- Jimmy Bralower – drum programming
- Carol Steele – congas
- Chaka Khan – backing vocals
