= Orianthi discography =

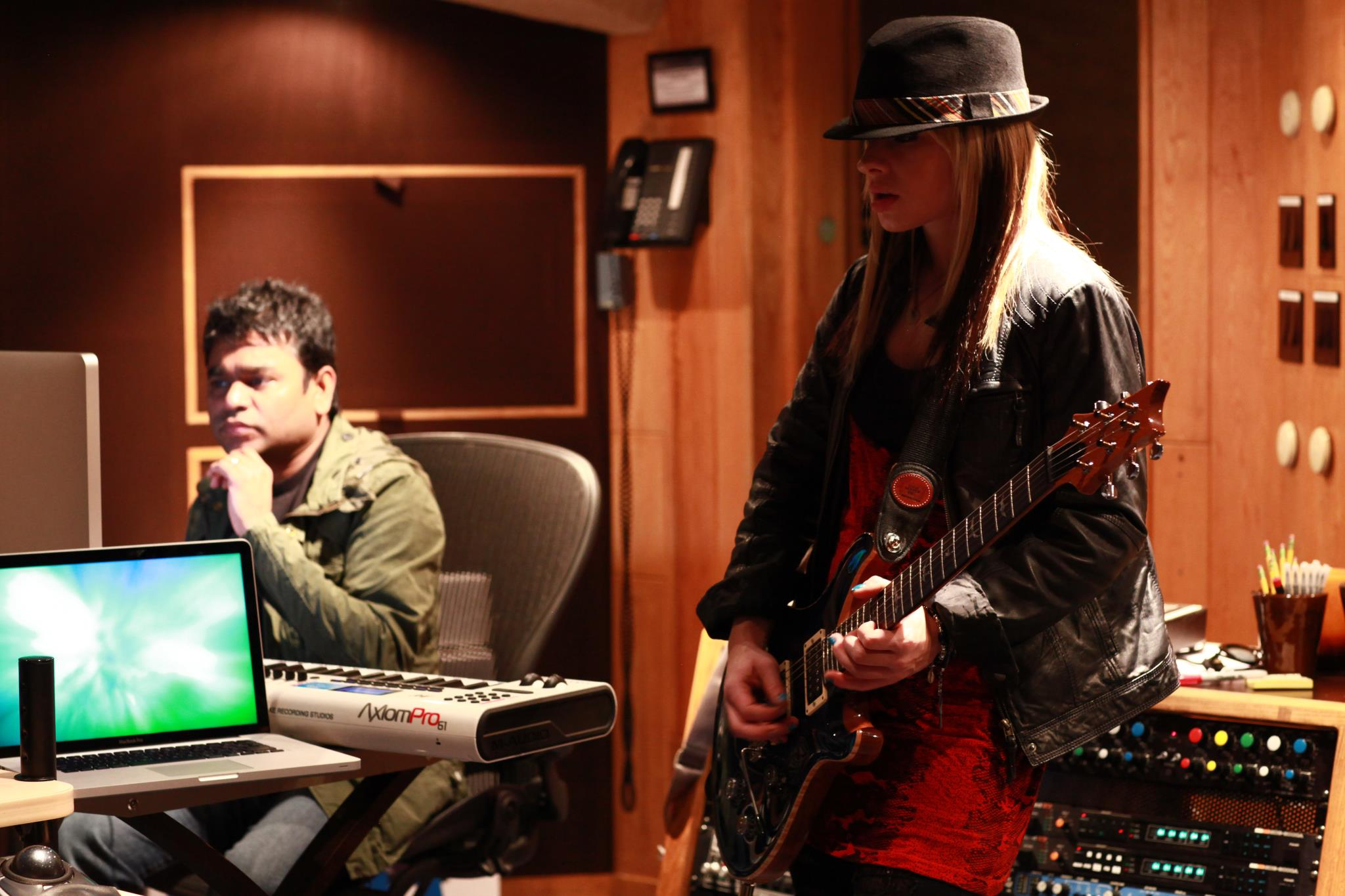
- Orianthi with A. R. Rahman during the recording of "Sadda Haq" in 2011
- Studio albums: 6
- Extended plays: 1
- Singles: 10
- Music videos: 14
- Re-issues: 1
- Collaborations: 21

The discography of Australian singer-songwriter Orianthi consists of six studio albums, six singles, ten music videos, a re-issue, an extended play, and 21 other collaborations. Her second studio album, Believe, was certified gold by the Recording Industry Association of Japan (RIAJ) in 2010.

== Albums ==
=== Studio albums ===
Title	Album details	Peak chart positions					Certifications
Title	Album details	AUS	JPN	SWI	US	US Indie	Certifications
Violet Journey	Released: 4 June 2007; Label: Universal Australia; Format: CD	—	—	—	—	—	
Believe	Released: 26 October 2009; Label: Geffen; Format: CD, digital download	88	4	—	77	—	RIAJ: Gold
Heaven in This Hell	Released: 12 March 2013; Label: Robo; Format: CD, digital download	—	38	—	—	35	
O	Released: 6 November 2020; Label: Frontiers; Format: CD, digital download, vinyl	—	60	—	—	—	
Rock Candy	Released: 14 October 2022; Label: Frontiers; Formats: CD, digital download, LP	—	—	63	—	—	
Some Kind of Feeling	Released: 27 June 2025; Label: Woodward Avenue; Formats: CD, vinyl	—	—	—	—	—	
"—" denotes releases that did not chart or was not released to that territory

=== Live albums ===
Title	Album details	Peak chart positions
Title	Album details	SWI
Live from Hollywood	Released: 15 July 2022; Label: Frontiers; Format: CD+Blu-ray	86

=== Re-issues ===
Title	Album details	Peak chart positions
Title	Album details	JPN
Believe (II)	Released: 28 September 2010; Label: Geffen, Universal; Format: CD, digital download	12

=== Compilation albums ===
Title	Album details	Peak chart positions
Title	Album details	JPN
The Best of Orianthi, Vol. 1	Released: 13 August 2014; Label: Orianthi Music, Universal; Format: CD, digital download	106

== Extended plays ==
Title	EP details
Fire	Released: 12 October 2011; Label: Self-released; Format: Digital download

== Singles ==
Year	Song	Peak chart positions							Certifications	Album
Year	Song	AUS	CAN	JPN	NZL	UK	US	US Adult	Certifications	Album
2009	"According to You"	8	22	3	39	159	17	6	ARIA: Platinum; RIAA: Platinum	Believe
2010	"Shut Up and Kiss Me"	85	—	11	—	—	—	38		Believe
2010	"Courage" (with Lacey Sturm)	—	—	—	—	—	—	33		Believe
2013	"Frozen"	—	—	—	—	—	—	—		Heaven in This Hell
2013	"Sex E Bizarre" (featuring Steven Tyler)	—	—	—	—	—	—	—		Heaven in This Hell
2014	"Better with You"	—	—	—	—	—	—	—		Heaven in This Hell
2020	"Sinners Hymn"	—	—	—	—	—	—	—		O
2020	"Impulsive"	—	—	—	—	—	—	—		O
2020	"Sorry"	—	—	—	—	—	—	—		O
2022	"Light It Up"	—	—	—	—	—	—	—		Rock Candy
"—" denotes releases that did not chart

== Featured songs ==
Year	Song	Peak chart	Album
Year	Song	CAN	Album
2009	"Les Paul Tribute" (Brian Ray featuring Orianthi)	—	Non-album single
2010	"Don't Waste the Pretty" (Allison Iraheta featuring Orianthi)	—	Just Like You
2010	"Walk This Way" (David Garrett featuring Orianthi)	—	Rock Symphonies
2011	"Can't Breathe" (Fefe Dobson featuring Orianthi)	19	Joy
2011	"Steel Bars" (Michael Bolton featuring Orianthi)	—	Gems
2011	"Little Sister" (Tokyo Police Club featuring Orianthi)	—	10x10x10
2011	"Sadda Haq" (Mohit Chauhan featuring Orianthi)	—	Rockstar
2011	"Brand New Wave" (Kylee featuring Orianthi)	—	17
2012	"Girl in a Catsuit" (Dave Stewart featuring Orianthi)	—	Ringmaster General
2012	"High" (The Fairchilds featuring Orianthi)	—	Non-album single
"—" denotes releases that did not chart

== Studio work ==
Year	Song	Peak chart		Album
Year	Song	CAN	UK	Album
2010	"Stairway to Heaven" (Mary J. Blige featuring Orianthi)	—	—	Stronger with Each Tear
2010	"Set It on Fire" (My Darkest Days featuring Orianthi)	—	—	My Darkest Days
2010	"Monster" (Artist credited as Michael Jackson featuring 50 Cent and Orianthi)	—	197	Michael (2010 Edition)
2010	"Sleepwalker" (Adam Lambert featuring Orianthi)	90	—	For Your Entertainment
"—" denotes releases that did not chart

== Songs in other media ==
Year	Song	Media	Type
2007	"Now or Never"	Bratz: The Movie	Movie soundtrack
2010	"According to You"	Rock Band 2	Music game
2010	"According to You"	iPhone Six String App	Mobile game
2010	"According to You"	Dance Dance Revolution	Music game
2010	"According to You"	Kinect Dance Paradise	Music game
2010	"According to You"	CSI: Crime Scene Investigation	TV series episode: Lost and Found and World's End
2010	"According to You"	Dancing with the Stars (U.S. season 11)	TV series episode: Week 6
2010	"According to You"	Disney Sing It: Party Hits	Music game
2010	"According to You"	U-Sing 2 Wii Australian Edition	Music game
2010	"Suffocated"	Guitar Hero: Warriors of Rock	Music game
2010	"Sunshine of Your Love"	Nissan Juke	TV commercial
2011	"Believe"	American Idol season 10	TV series episode: Hollywood Week round 2
2011	"All Right Now"	Hyundai	TV commercial
2012	"Neo Universe"	L'Arc-en-Ciel Tribute	Tribute Album

== Music videos ==
Year	Song	Director
2007	"Now or Never" (promotional video)	Unknown
2009	"According to You"	Marc Klasfeld
2010	"Highly Strung" (with Steve Vai)	Marc Klasfeld
2010	"We Are the World 25 for Haiti" (with Artists for Haiti)	Paul Haggis
2010	"Shut Up and Kiss Me"	Ray Kay
2010	"Courage" (with Lacey Sturm)	Scott Speer
2012	"Girl in a Catsuit" (Dave Stewart featuring Orianthi)	Chris Champeau
2012	"High" (The Fairchilds featuring Orianthi)	Adam Rothlein
2013	"Heaven in This Hell"	Paul Boyd
2014	"Livin' On a Prayer" UNPLUGGED (with Richie Sambora featuring Orianthi) youtu.be/E-HHV-EymIs	Unknown
2020	"Sinners Hymn"	
2020	"Impulsive"	Jim Louvau & Tony Aguilera
2020	"Sorry"	Jim Louvau & Tony Aguilera
2022	"Light it Up"	
2022	"Where Did Your Heart Go"	
