= Shut Up and Kiss Me (Orianthi song) =

"Shut Up & Kiss Me"

Single by Orianthi

from the album Believe (II)
- Released: 6 April 2010
- Recorded: 2009
- Genre: Pop rock
- Length: 3:16
- Label: Geffen
- Songwriters: Orianthi, Steve Diamond, Andrew Frampton
- Producer: Howard Benson

Orianthi singles chronology
"According to You" (2009)	"Shut Up & Kiss Me" (2010)	"Courage" (2010)

"Shut Up & Kiss Me" (also referred to as Shut Up and Kiss Me) is a song recorded by Australian guitarist and rock singer Orianthi for Believe (II), the 2010 re-issue of her second studio album, Believe (2009). It was released to digital retailers through Geffen Records as the second single from the album on 6 April 2010. Orianthi co-wrote the song with Steve Diamond and Andrew Frampton, the songwriters responsible for her debut single and top 20 hit "According to You"; the song was produced by Howard Benson.

The song features a pop rock arrangement and prominent rock-style guitar riffs, particularly during the intro and the bridge. "Shut Up and Kiss Me" is one of the most pop-oriented tracks on Believe, which in general tends towards pop-rock over the hard rock of her first album, Violet Journey (2007). In a 2013 interview, Orianthi revealed that "Shut Up & Kiss Me" was "too poppy" for her tastes and that she would have preferred her Desmond Child-co-write "Bad News" as the second single.

Though failing to replicate the success of its predecessor, "Shut Up & Kiss Me" still attained a modest peak of 38 on Billboard's Adult Pop single chart, in addition to charting in both Australia and Japan. The song garnered praise for its radio-friendly sound and infusion of pop and rock elements, drawing comparisons to the music of Kelly Clarkson.

== Charts ==
Chart performance for "Shut Up and Kiss Me"
Chart (2010)	Peak position
Australia (ARIA)	85
Canada Hot AC (Billboard)	40
Japan Hot 100 (Billboard)	11
US Adult Pop Airplay (Billboard)	38

== Release history ==
Release dates and formats for "Shut Up and Kiss Me"
Region	Date	Format	Label(s)	Ref.
United States	April 13, 2010	Mainstream airplay	Interscope	
