= Don't Want You Back =

2000 song by British singer Ellie Campbell

Single by Ellie Campbell

from the album Ellie
- Released: October 2000
- Recorded: 2000
- Studio: PWL Studios, London
- Genre: Pop
- Length: 3:20
- Label: Jive Records; Eastern Bloc Records
- Songwriter(s): Pete Waterman; Mark Topham; Karl Twigg
- Producer(s): Mark Topham; Karl Twigg

Ellie Campbell singles chronology
"So Many Ways" (1999)	"Don't Want You Back" (2000)	"You're No Good" (2001)

"Don't Want You Back" is a song by British singer Ellie Campbell. The song was released in October 2000 as the third single from her debut studio album, Ellie (2001). The song peaked at number 50 on the UK Singles Chart.

== Track listing ==
European single (9201302)

1. "Don't Want You Back" (radio edit) - 3:20
2. "Don't Want You Back" (Danja-Mouse remix) - 2:48
3. "Don't Want You Back" (W.I.P. remix - edit) - 2:48
4. "Don't Want You Back" (Enhanced video) - 4:32

Australian single

1. "Don't Want You Back" (radio edit) - 3:20
2. "Don't Want You Back" (W.I.P. remix) - 4:33
3. "Message from Ellie" - 0:17
4. "Album Sampler" (Excerpts from: "You're No Good", "So Many Ways" and "Sweet Lies")

== Charts ==
Chart (2001)	Peak position
Australia (ARIA)	44
United Kingdom (Official Charts Company)	50
