= Everyday =

Everyday or Every Day may refer to:

- Everyday life

== Books ==
- Every Day (novel), by David Levithan, 2012

== Film and television ==
- Every Day (2010 film), an American comedy-drama starring Liev Schreiber and Helen Hunt
- Everyday (film), a 2012 British drama directed by Michael Winterbottom
- Every Day (2018 film), an American romantic drama based on the book of the same name
- "Every Day", a 2023 episode of Good Omens
- Everyday (video), a viral video produced by American photographer Noah Kalina

== Music ==
=== Albums ===
- Every Day (album), by the Cinematic Orchestra, 2002
- Everyday (Dave Matthews Band album), 2001
- Everyday (Hillsong United album) or the title song, 1999
- Everyday (Widespread Panic album), 1993
- Everyday (Winner album), 2018
- Everyday, an album by Activ, 2007
- Everyday, an EP by Girl's Day, 2010

=== Songs ===
- "Everyday" (Angie Stone song), 2000
- "Everyday" (Ariana Grande song), 2017
- "Everyday" (ASAP Rocky song), 2015
- "Everyday" (Bon Jovi song), 2002
- "Everyday" (Buddy Holly song), 1957
- "Everyday" (Dave Matthews Band song), 2001
- "Everyday" (DJ Méndez song), 2018
- "Every Day" (Eric Prydz song), 2012
- "Everyday" (High School Musical song), 2007
- "Everyday" (Logic and Marshmello song), 2018
- "Everyday" (The Oak Ridge Boys song), 1984
- "Everyday" (Orchestral Manoeuvres in the Dark song), 1993
- "Everyday" (Phil Collins song), 1993
- "Every Day" (Rascal Flatts song), 2007
- "Everyday" (Slade song), 1974
- "Every Day" (Stevie Nicks song), 2001
- "Everyday" (Takagi & Ketra song), 2023
- "Everyday" (Toby Lightman song), 2004
- "Every Day (I Love You More)", by Jason Donovan, 1989
- "Everyday (Rudebwoy)", by Kardinal Offishall, 2005
- "Everyday", by 54-40 from Show Me, 1987
- "Every Day", by AFX from Hangable Auto Bulb, 1995
- "Everyday", by Agnelli & Nelson, 1999
- "Everyday", by Alexia from The Party, 1998
- "Everyday", by The Americanos, Dram and Kyle, 2017
- "Everyday", by Anne Murray from Yes I Do, 1991
- "Everyday", by Anticappella, 1991
- "Everyday", by b4-4 from b4-4, 2000
- "Everyday", by Ben E. King from Music Trance, 1980
- "Everyday", by Bif Naked from Superbeautifulmonster, 2005
- "Everyday", by BoDeans from Still, 2008
- "Everyday", by Cheryl Lynn from Start Over, 1987
- "Everyday", by Def Leppard from X, 2002
- "Everyday", by Don McLean from And I Love You So, 1989
- "Everyday", by En Vogue from Soul Flower, 2004
- "Everyday", by Five from Invincible, 1999
- "Everyday", by Hussein Fatale from In the Line of Fire, 1998
- "Everyday", by Ivy from Realistic, 1995
- "Everyday", by Jimmy Gilmer from Buddy's Buddy, 1964
- "Everyday", by Joy Williams from By Surprise, 2002
- "Everyday", by Julian Lennon from The Secret Value of Daydreaming, 1986
- "Everyday", by Kim English from My Destiny, 2002
- "Everyday", by Lisa Loeb from Hello Lisa, 2002
- "Everyday", by Orianthi from Violet Journey, 2007
- "Everyday", by Ringo Starr from Vertical Man, 1998
- "Every Day", by Roxette from The Ballad Hits, 2002
- "Everyday", by Scatman John from Take Your Time, 1999
- "Every Day", or "Ev'ry Day", by Shelton Brooks, 1918
- "Every Day", by Sick Puppies from Welcome to the Real World, 2001
- "Every Day", by Wally Lewis, 1959
- "Everyday", by Weyes Blood from Titanic Rising, 2019
- "Everyday", by Whiteout from Bite It, 1995
- "Everyday", by Z-Ro from The Life of Joseph W. McVey, 2004
- "Everyday (Coolin')", by Swizz Beatz from Haute Living, 2018
- "Everyday (Late November)", by Social Code from Social-Code, 2007
