= Rock candy (disambiguation) =

Rock candy is a type of confection composed of relatively large sugar crystals.

Rock candy may also refer to:

- "Rock Candy" (song), a song by Montrose
- Rock Candy (album), an album by Orianthi
- Rock Candy Records, a British record label

== See also ==
- Rock (confectionery), cylindrical British boiled candy
- Justin Rockcandy, a character in the Adventure Time episode "The Diary"
