= Pratidin =

Pratidin (lit. 'daily' or 'everyday') may refer to:

== Media ==
- Asomiya Pratidin, Assamese-language daily newspaper from India
  - Pratidin Time, an Assamese-language news channel, owned by the newspaper
- Bangladesh Pratidin, Bengali-language daily newspaper from Bangladesh

== Films ==
- Ek Din Pratidin, a 1979 Indian Bengali-language film

== See also ==
- Everyday (disambiguation)
- Daily (disambiguation)
