= Mass Production (disambiguation) =

Mass production is the production of large amounts of standardized products, including and especially on assembly lines.

Mass Production may also refer to:

- Mass Production (band), an American funk/disco group
- Mass Production (Iggy Pop), a 1977 track from the album The Idiot
