= Let Me Live in Your Life =

Studio album by Ben E. King
- Released: 1978
- Studios: ABC, Kendun, Daily Planet, Blank Tape
- Genre: Soul
- Length: 40:15
- Label: Atlantic
- Producers: Lamont Dozier, Bettye Crutcher, Jim Stewart, Patrick Adams

Ben E. King chronology
| Rhapsody (1976) | Let Me Live in Your Life (1978) | Music Trance (1980) |

Professional ratings
Review scores
| Source | Rating |
|---|---|
| AllMusic | 3/5 stars |
| The Virgin Encyclopedia of R&B and Soul | 2/5 stars |

Let Me Live in Your Life is an album by the American musician Ben E. King, released in 1978 through Atlantic Records.

Some tracks from Rhapsody appear on this album. "Tippin'", "I See the Light", "Dark Storm on the Horizon", and "Spoiled" are new tracks. "Let Me Live in Your Life", "Fifty Years" and "Sweet Rhapsody" were originally recorded by Motown group the Originals for their 1975 Lamont Dozier-produced album California Sunset.

== Track listing ==
All tracks composed by Lamont Dozier; except where indicated

1. "Tippin'" (Bettye Crutcher) [4:00]
2. "Wonder Woman" [3:23]
3. "Let Me Live in Your Life" [5:03]
4. "I See the Light" (Bobby Manuel, Jimmy Joy, Jimmy McGhee, Melvin Robertson, William Murphy) [3:30]
5. "Fly Away (To My Wonderland)" (Lamont Dozier, McKinley Jackson) [4:06]
6. "Dark Storm on the Horizon" (Barry Goldberg, Gerry Goffin) [4:27]
7. "Family Jewels" [3:38]
8. "Sweet Rhapsody" [3:57]
9. "Spoiled" (Ben E. King, J.R. Bailey, Michael Brandon) [3:39]
10. "Fifty Years" [4:32]

== Personnel ==
- Bobby Manuel, Jay Graydon, Jimmy McGhee, Ken Mazur, Lee Ritenour, Stan Lucas - guitar
- Jimmy Joy, John Barnes, Leroy Burgess, Patrick Adams - keyboards
- James Jamerson, Norbert Sloley, Scott Edwards, William Murphy, Wilton Felder - bass guitar
- James Gadson, Jim Gordon, Melvin Robertson, Richard Taninbaum - drums
- Eddie "Bongo" Brown - bongos, congas
- Gary Coleman, Michael Lewis - percussion
- Christine Wiltshire, the Duncan Sisters, Gina Tharps, Gwen Owens, the Jones Girls (Brenda, Shirley & Valerie), Rhodes Chalmers & Rhodes, Roberta Moore, the Waters - backing vocals
- The Memphis Symphony - strings
- Johnny Allen - arrangements
- McKinley Jackson, Paul Riser - horn arrangements
