= I've Got a Rock 'n' Roll Heart =

Single by Eric Clapton

from the album Money and Cigarettes
- B-side: "Man in Love"
- Released: January 1983
- Genre: Rock
- Length: 3:13
- Label: Warner Bros.
- Songwriters: Troy Seals, Eddie Setser, Steve Diamond
- Producer: Tom Dowd

Eric Clapton singles chronology
"Another Ticket" (1981)	"I've Got a Rock 'n' Roll Heart" (1983)	"The Shape You're In" (1983)

"I've Got a Rock 'n' Roll Heart" is a song written by Troy Seals, Eddie Setser, and Steve Diamond and recorded by Eric Clapton. It appeared on Clapton's album Money and Cigarettes released in January 1983. The release was successful in the United States, peaking at 18 on the Billboard Hot 100 and reached number 6 on the Adult Contemporary chart the same year.

== Adaptation ==
In 2010, it was used as part of an advertisement campaign for a Fender edition of the T-Mobile HTC Magic myTouch 3G telephone. Clapton also appeared in the commercial, and resurrected the song for his North American tour with Roger Daltrey. This re-boosted popularity of the song, and as of February 2010 the song had sold 112,798 digital downloads in the United States.

The song is also used prominently in a first season episode of Knight Rider titled "A Nice, Indecent Little Town".

== Chart positions ==
=== Weekly charts ===
Chart (1983)	Peak position
Australia (ARIA)	81
Canada (CHUM)	12
Canadian Top Singles (RPM)	17
New Zealand (Recorded Music NZ)	29
UK Singles (Official Charts)	83
US Adult Contemporary (Billboard)	6
US Billboard Hot 100	18

Year-end chart (1983)	Rank
US Top Pop Singles (Billboard)	94
