= Steve Diamond (musician) =

Steve Diamond is a songwriter, producer, and multi-instrumentalist. Diamond has worked with many artists such as Eric Clapton, Miley Cyrus, Orianthi, Willie Nelson, *NSYNC, Britney Spears and Vince Gill. As LJ and The Diamond Mind he has released an EP, Treasure This, on Extreme Music.

== Career ==
Steve Diamond started his first band at the age of 13 and signed a record deal because of his original material at the age of 17. After studying music at UCLA, Diamond began to work in the professional world as a session and touring musician. He had his first worldwide hit with "I've Got a Rock N'Roll Heart" which was recorded by Eric Clapton. “I Can Love You Like That” was a #1 pop hit for All 4 One and #1 country hit for John Michael Montgomery. The song was nominated for 4 Grammys and was Song of The Year. The Backstreet Boys would record "Never Gone" which was the title of the band's album. Additionally they recorded "What Makes You Different" which is featured in The Princess Diaries. His song, "I Learned From You" was recorded by Miley Cyrus and she released it on two albums. “Consider Me Gone” was Reba’s biggest charting hit which was #1 for four weeks.

Orianthi (former Michael Jackson’s guitar player) had a worldwide hit with "According To You". "Let Me Let Go" was a #1 for Faith Hill in country and AC charts. She received a Grammy nomination for her performance of this song. Other artists who have recorded Diamond’s songs include, Britney Spears, Willie Nelson, Brooks and Dunn, Ray Charles, NSYNC, Westlife, Pussycat Dolls, Paul Rogers, Lonestar, Nika Costa, Greg Allman, Maxi Priest, Ronan Keating and Andy Taylor. Diamond has been doing some work in the K-pop world and had a hit with "Better" by Hotshot and has an upcoming release by the K-pop supergroup GOT'S and the Brazilian singer Ameliee. He has written songs with artists such as Vince Gill, Joss Stone, Jon Bonjovi, Paul Stanley and Judith Hill.

== Awards ==
- "Song of the Year" by ASCAP, BMI and NSAI
  - "I Can Love You Like That" - All 4 One, John Michael Montgomery
    - 4 time Grammy Nomination
- Songwriter of The Year American Songwriter Magazine
- Grammy nomination
  - "Let Me Let Go" (#1 Single)
- Emmy, "Outstanding Original Song"
  - "Consider Me Gone" - Reba (#1 for four weeks)
- ASCAP Performance Award
  - "Not A Day Goes By" - Lonestar
- ASCAP Performance Award
  - "I've Got a Rock n' Roll Heart" - Eric Clapton
- ASCAP Performance Award
  - "According To You" - Orianthi

== Recordings ==
- Eric Clapton - "I've Got a Rock N' Roll Heart"
  - Top 5 worldwide hit
  - Awarded by ASCAP for being one of the most performed songs, in a T-MOBILE television commercial.
- All-4-One - "I Can Love You Like That"
  - #1 for three weeks,
  - nominated for four Grammys
  - ASCAP and BMI song of the year.
- Orianthi - “According to You”
  - 1st single from her debut album
  - #2 on the airplay charts. It is the new UK and German single as well. Steve also co-wrote her second single, “SHUT UP AND KISS ME.”
- Judith Hill - "Jammin' in the Basement", "Angel in the Dark"
  - Prince produced two songs that Diamond wrote with Judith for her debut album
- Miley Cyrus- “I Learned From You”
- Reba McEntire –“Consider Me Gone”
  - #1 for four weeks and is her biggest record ever.
- Agnes - "On and On"
    1. 1 in Scandinavia
  - Steve has 4 songs on the album.
- Anastacia - "Resurrection"
- The Tenors - "Lead With Your Heart"
  - Title cut of their album, their tour and their PBS special.
- Britney Spears - "I'll Never Stop Loving You"
- Noel Scharjris - "Un Poco Mas De Ti"
- Noel Scharjris - "Magico"
- David Archuleta - "Zero Gravity"
  - International Hit
- John Michael Montgomery - "I can Love You Like That"
  - 1 for three weeks
  - Nominated for Grammys as Best Country Song and Best Male Vocal Performance
  - On his current Greatest Hits CD.
- Faith Hill - "Let Me Let Go"
  - 1 hit from her Warner Bros. album, Faith
  - First single from the soundtrack album to "MESSAGE IN A BOTTLE", starring Kevin Costner and Paul Newman
- Pussycat Dolls - "Played"
- NSYNC - "On the Line"
- Backstreet Boys - "What Makes You Different"
  - Featured in The Princess Diaries
- Lonestar - "Not a Day Goes By"
  - Nominated for a Grammy
- Willie Nelson - "You've Been Leaving Me For Years"
- Charice - "Nothing" (Production)
- Westlife - "Let's Make Tonight Special"
- Vince Gill - "For the Last Time"
- Kelly Clarkson - "I Won't Stand in Line"
- Delta Rae - "What Matters Most"
  - From the Weinstein Film “Escape From Planet Earth”-End Title
- Brooks & Dunn - "Unloved"
  - On their platinum CD "Stars & Stripes."
- Nikka Costa - "You Just Said a Heartful"
- Ryan Cabrerra - "Shame On Me"
- Triple 8 - "It Only Happens With You"
- Maxi Priest - "It Starts in The Heart"
  - End title of the Disney film, Jungle 2 Jungle featuring Tim Allen
  - Produced by Don Was.
- True Vibe - "On The Line"
- Jump 5 - "Dreaming in Color"
- Oleta Adams and Brenda Russell - "We Will Find a Way"
- Dream Street - "They Don't Understand"
  - On their gold CD
- J'Son - "I'll Never Stop Loving You"
  - 1 at BET
  - Featured in First Kid
- Ronan Keating - "If You Love Me"
- Ronan Keating - "I Followed My Heart"
- Joe Diffie - "Not In This Lifetime"
- Lace - "If Not For Loving You"
  - Produced by David Foster
- Innosense - "Go Baby Go"
- Innosense - "Don't Cha"
- Innosense - "You Can't Touch Me Now"
- Greg Allman - "Evidence of Love"
  - On Allman's platinum album, I'm No Angel
- Paul Rodgers (The Law) - "Anything For You"
- Chico DeBarge - "One Track Heart" (writing and production)
- Cherie - "Body Soul and Heart"
- Wade Hayes - "The Day That She Left Tulsa"
    1. 4 hit and it climbed the charts for 23 weeks.
- John Farnham - "Soul Reason"
- Shenandoah - "I Will Know You"
  - On the band's "Greatest Hits: Now & Then" album
- L.A. Guns - "Kiss My Love Goodbye"
  - First single from their last album
  - Top 10 record and is in the Rodney Dangerfield film, "Ladybug" through Paramount
- Vanessa Amorosi - "Sleep With That"
- Precious - "It's Gonna Be My Way"
- Alias - "Haunted Heart"
  - Top 10 in US and Canada
- Nobody's Angel - "What Cha Gonna Do"
  - End title song and single for 102 Dalmatians.
- Brad Hawkins - "Starlight", "Somehow She Knows", "Better To Burn"
- Joey Lawrence - "Night by Night"
  - Joey was the star of the hit TV show Blossom
- 38 Special - "I Ought To Let Go"
  - Only outside song on their platinum album "Tour De Force"
- Lee Greenwood - "Don't Underestimate My Love For You
    1. 1 single for Lee
  - Received an ASCAP award for being one of the most performed songs
- Hannah Montana - "I Learned From You"
  - sold over 4 million copies
- End title song for the film “Bridge to Terabithia” and on the sound track as well.
- Air Supply - "Evidence Of Love"
- Gorky Park - "All Roads"
- Andy Taylor - "Dead on The Money"
- Corolla - "The Girl Who Had Everything
- Top 5 single from her VIRGIN record, "Much More"
- B.J. Nelson - "Evidence Of Love"
- 98* - "Can You Imagine"
- Nia Peeples - "For the Sake of Loving"
- David Cassidy - "Like Father Like Son"
- Anita Pointer - "Have a Little Faith in Love", "You Don't Scare Me"
- Starship - "Girls Like You"
  - On their platinum album, "No Protection".
- Play - "Watch Me Now"
- Emerson Lake and Palmer - "Give Me A Reason To Stay"
- Joe Cocker - "Love To Lean On"
- Shark Island - "Bad For Each Other"
- Contraband - "Bad For Each Other"
- Keel - "So Many Good Ways to Be Bad"
- Communion - "With Everything I Feel"
- Amanda - "If I Open Up My Heart"
- Ellie Campbell - "Jackie", "Say What You Mean"
- Ameliee - "Supernatural"

=== Film credits ===
- Escape from Planet Earth - "What Matters Most"
  - End title song and is in the film twice
- Princess Diaries - "What Makes You Different"
  - Performed by the Backstreet Boys
- Bridge to Terabithia - "I Learned From You"
  - Performed by Miley Cyrus
  - End title song for this film.
- On The Line - "On The Line"
  - Performed by members of N'SYNC, BB Mak and True Vibe
  - First single from the upcoming film "On The Line," starring Lance and Joey from N'SYNC
- 102 Dalmatians - "What Cha Gonna Do"
  - End Title song and first single
- Jimmy Neutron - "I Can Count On You"
- Pokemon 2000 - "They Don't Understand"
- Message in a Bottle - "Let Me Let Go"
  - Produced by David Foster
  - Recorded by Faith Hill
  - First single off the soundtrack album
- Jungle to Jungle - "It Starts in The Heart"
  - Performed by Maxi Priest
  - End Title
- Corrina Corrina - "We Will Find a Way
  - End Title
  - Performed by Oleta Adams & Brenda Russell.
- First Kid - "I'll Never Stop Loving You, "I Can Love You Like That" (production)
- Last Dance - "Throwin' Good Love After Bad"
- Money For Nothing - "I Can Laugh About it Now"
- Blank Check - "Wild Obsession"
  - Performed by LA Guns
- Lady Bug - "Kiss My Love Goodbye"
  - Performed by LA Guns for this Paramount Film starring Rodney Dangerfield
- Tequila Sunrise - "Dead On The Money"
- Gross Anatomy - "I'll Be There"
  - End title
- Harley Davidson & The Marlboro Man - "Wild Obsession"
- Johnny Be Good - "If There's Any Justice"
- Hearts of Fire - "The Nights We Spent On Earth
- Perfect - "Uncover Me" (writing and production)
