= Music Trance =

Studio album by Ben E. King
- Released: 1980
- Studios: Atlantic, New York
- Genre: Soul
- Length: 40:04
- Label: Atlantic
- Producers: Bert DeCoteaux, Mass Production

Ben E. King chronology
Let Me Live in Your Life (1978)	Music Trance (1980)	What Is Soul (1981)

Professional ratings
Review scores
Source	Rating
AllMusic	2.5/5 stars
The Encyclopedia of Popular Music	2/5 stars
The New Rolling Stone Record Guide	2/5 stars

Music Trance is a studio album by Ben E. King, released in 1980.

It contains only seven tracks; however, the tracks are some of the longest he ever recorded. As a result, the length of the album is longer than many of his others.

The single "Music Trance" peaked at No. 29 on the Billboard Hot R&B/Hip-Hop Songs chart. The B-side contained "And This Is Love". The album peaked at No. 73 on the Billboard Top R&B Albums chart.

== Production ==
The production was shared by productionsherers, Mass Production and Bert DeCoteaux.

== Track listing ==
1. "Music Trance" (Ben E. King) [5:56]
2. "And This Is Love" (Barrie Palmer, Janet Alhanti) [4:07]
3. "Touched by Your Love" (Ben E. King, Bert DeCoteaux, Melvin Shaw) [5:39]
4. "You've Only Got One Chance to Be Young" (Ben E. King, Melvin Shaw) [6:16]
5. "Hired Gun" (Gregory McCoy, James Drumgole) [6:11]
6. "Everyday" (Gregory McCoy, James Drumgole) [5:35]
7. "Work That Body" (Tyrone Williams) [6:20]
