= Believe (Orianthi album) =

Studio album by Orianthi
- Released: 26 October 2009
- Studio: Bay 7 Studios, Valley Village; Sparky Dark Studio, Calabasas; Sunset Sound, Hollywood
- Genre: Hard rock; pop metal
- Length: 42:06
- Label: Geffen
- Producer: Howard Benson; RedOne

Orianthi chronology
Violet Journey (2007)	Believe (2009)	Heaven in This Hell (2013)

Alternative cover
- Believe (II) and UK cover

Singles from Believe
- 1. "According to You" Released: 6 October 2009; 2. "Shut Up and Kiss Me" Released: 6 April 2010; 3. "Courage" Released: 31 August 2010

Professional ratings
Review scores
Source	Rating
AllMusic	4/5 stars

Believe is the second studio album by Australian guitarist Orianthi and her debut album recorded for a major label. It was released on 26 October 2009 by Geffen Records. The album's release was pushed back by Geffen to coincide with the compilation album This Is It by Michael Jackson, as a result of the publicity generated from her appearance in the concert film of the same name. The album peaked at number 77 at the Billboard 200.

The song "Believe" from which the album is titled, is a cover of the Niels Brinck's song "Believe Again", best known as the Danish entry for the Eurovision Song Contest 2009. Virtuoso guitarist Steve Vai appears on and co-wrote the song "Highly Strung". "Suffocated", a cover of a song by American band Sound the Alarm, appears on the soundtrack of music video game Guitar Hero: Warriors of Rock.

The album was re-released as Believe (II) on 8 June 2010. Two tracks from Believe are remixed ("Bad News" and "Think Like a Man"), while "God Only Knows", "Untogether", and "Drive Away" are omitted. It also includes four new songs, including the album's second single "Shut Up and Kiss Me".

== Track listing ==
All songs were produced by Howard Benson. (Catalogue: 2724713)

Believe standard edition
No.	Title	Writer(s)	Length
1.	"According to You"	Steve Diamond; Andrew Frampton	3:20
2.	"Suffocated" (Sound the Alarm cover)	Brian Chiusano; Colin Ellis; Joe Brule; Fredrick Stephans; Cody Jancovic	3:03
3.	"Bad News"	Orianthi; Andreas Carlsson; Desmond Child	3:10
4.	"Believe" (Niels Brinck cover)	Lars Halvor Jensen; Martin M. Larsson; Ronan Keating	3:40
5.	"Feels Like Home"	Orianthi; Anthony Mazza; Stefanie Ridel	4:16
6.	"Think Like a Man"	Orianthi; Martin Briley; Dana Calitri; Nina Ossoff	3:36
7.	"What's It Gonna Be"	Orianthi; Jimmy Messer	2:49
8.	"Untogether"	Orianthi; Jodi Marr; Greg Wells	3:53
9.	"Drive Away"	Orianthi	4:17
10.	"Highly Strung" (with Steve Vai)	Orianthi; Steve Vai	4:08
11.	"God Only Knows"	Orianthi; David Bassett; Tommy Lee James; Stefanie Ridel	3:55

North American iTunes Store edition bonus track
No.	Title	Writer(s)	Length
12.	"Find It"	Orianthi; Phil Buckle	4:06

South Korean and international digital edition bonus track
No.	Title	Writer(s)	Length
12.	"Don't Tell Me That It's Over"	Orianthi; Alex Band; Daniel Damico	3:31

Japanese edition bonus tracks
No.	Title	Writer(s)	Length
12.	"Don't Tell Me That It's Over"	Orianthi; Alex Band; Daniel Damico	3:31
13.	"Find It"	Orianthi; Phil Buckle	4:06

=== Believe (II) ===
All songs produced by Howard Benson, except track 12 produced by RedOne.

No.	Title	Writer(s)	Length
1.	"According to You"	Diamond; Frampton	3:20
2.	"Shut Up and Kiss Me"	Orianthi; Diamond; Frampton	3:16
3.	"Courage" (featuring Lacey of Flyleaf)	Orianthi; Kira Leyden; Jeff Andrea; Howard Benson	3:38
4.	"Bad News"	Orianthi; Carlsson; Child	3:06
5.	"Feels Like Home"	Orianthi; Mazza; Ridel	4:16
6.	"Think Like a Man"	Orianthi; Briley; Calitri; Ossoff	3:22
7.	"What's It Gonna Be"	Orianthi; Messer	2:49
8.	"Missing You" (John Waite cover)	Waite; Mark Leonard; Charles Sandford	3:41
9.	"Suffocated" (Sound the Alarm cover)	Chiusano; Ellis; Brule; Stephans; Jancovic; Benson	3:03
10.	"Highly Strung" (featuring Steve Vai)	Orianthi; Vai	4:08
11.	"Believe" (Niels Brinck cover)	Orianthi; Jensen; Larsson; Keating	3:40
12.	"Addicted to Love"	Orianthi; RedOne; Alaina Beaton	3:42
Total length:			42:01

North American iTunes Store bonus track
No.	Title	Writer(s)	Length
13.	"Find It"	Orianthi; Phil Buckle	4:06

United Kingdom and Asian edition, and international digital repackage bonus track
No.	Title	Writer(s)	Length
13.	"Sunshine of Your Love" (Cream cover)	Jack Bruce; Pete Brown; Eric Clapton	4:00

Japanese edition bonus tracks
No.	Title	Writer(s)	Length
13.	"Sunshine of Your Love" (Cream cover)	Bruce; Brown; Eric Clapton	4:00
14.	"According to You" (Jason Sangerman Remix)	Diamond; Frampton	3:40
15.	"Sunshine of Your Love" (Juke Mix)	Bruce; Brown; Clapton	4:00

The Believe EP tracklist
No.	Title	Writer(s)	Length
1.	"Shut Up and Kiss Me"	Orianthi; Diamond; Frampton	3:16
2.	"Courage" (featuring Lacey of Flyleaf)	Orianthi; Kira Leyden; Jeff Andrea; Howard Benson	3:38
3.	"Missing You" (John Waite cover)	Waite; Mark Leonard; Charles Sandford	3:41
4.	"Addicted to Love"	Orianthi; RedOne; Alaina Beaton	3:42

== Singles ==
- "According to You" is the debut single off the album. The music video for the single was directed by Marc Klasfeld. The song became a radio hit and commercial success in her local country Australia by reaching number 8 on the ARIA Charts. The song quickly gained popularity in the US and peaked at number 17 on the Hot 100 and number 1 on American Top 40.

== Personnel ==
=== Musicians ===
- Orianthi – guitar, vocals
- Steve Vai – guitar
- Phil X – guitar
- Marc VanGool - guitar
- Brian Chiusano – guitar
- Tal Herzberg – bass, engineer, executive producer, A&R
- Paul Bushnell – bass
- Chris Chaney – bass
- Frank Zummo – drums
- Josh Freese – drums
- Michito Sánchez – percussion
- Howard Benson – keyboards, programming, producer
- Kim Bullard – keyboards, programming

=== Production ===
- Simon Fuller – executive producer
- Stirling McIlwaine – executive producer
- Ron Fair – executive producer
- Mike Plotnikoff – engineer
- Hatsukazu "Hatch" Inagaki – engineer
- Ryan Shanahan – assistant engineer
- Jimmy Fahey – assistant engineer
- Paul DeCarli – digital editing
- Brad Townsend – mixing
- Andrew Schubert – mixing
- Chris Lord-Alge – mixing
- Keith Armstrong – mixing assistant
- Nik Karpen – mixing assistant
- Ted Jensen – mastering
- Chapman Baehler – photography
- Marc VanGool – guitar, guitar technician
- Jon Nicholson – drum technician
- Keki Mingus – creative director
- Cliff Feiman – production supervisor

== Chart performance ==
Chart performance for Believe
Chart (2009–2010)	Peak position
Australian Albums (ARIA)	88
Japanese Albums (Oricon) Believe	4
Japanese Albums (Oricon) Believe (II)	12
US Billboard 200	77
US Heatseekers Albums (Billboard)	1
US Top Rock Albums (Billboard)	19

== Certifications ==
Certifications for Believe
Region	Certification	Certified units/sales
Japan (RIAJ)	Gold	100,000^{^}
^{^} Shipments figures based on certification alone.

== Release history ==
Release history for Believe
Region	Date	Format	Label
United States	26 October 2009	CD, digital download	Geffen
Australia	6 November 2009	CD, digital download	Universal Music
Canada	8 December 2009	CD, digital download	Universal Music
South Korea	10 December 2009	CD, digital download	Universal Music
Netherlands	September 2010	CD, digital download	Universal Music
United Kingdom	13 September 2010	CD, digital download	Universal Music
