= So Many Ways (Ellie Campbell song) =

Single by Ellie Campbell

from the album Ellie
- B-side: "Just Another Rainy Day"
- Released: August 1999
- Recorded: 1999
- Studio: PWL Studios, London
- Genre: Pop
- Length: 3:17
- Label: Jive Records; Eastern Bloc Records
- Songwriters: Pete Waterman; Dan Frampton
- Producers: Pete Waterman; Dan Frampton

Ellie Campbell singles chronology
"Sweet Lies" (1999)	"So Many Ways" (1999)	"Don't Want You Back" (2000)

"So Many Ways" is a song by British singer Ellie Campbell. The song was released in August 1999 as the second single from her debut studio album, Ellie (2001). The song peaked at number 26 on the UK Singles Chart, and remains her highest charting single to date.

== Track listing ==
UK single (0519362)

1. "So Many Ways" - 3:17
2. "So Many Ways" (Instrumental) - 3:17
3. "Just Another Rainy Day" - 3:58

== Charts ==
Chart (1999)	Peak position
Australia (ARIA Charts)	227
Netherlands (Single Top 100)	86
United Kingdom (Official Charts Company)	26
