= Money and Cigarettes =

Studio album by Eric Clapton
- Released: 31 January 1983
- Recorded: Late 1982
- Studios: Compass Point Studios (Nassau, Bahamas)
- Genre: Rock
- Length: 37:08
- Label: Duck · Warner Bros.
- Producer: Eric Clapton · Tom Dowd

Eric Clapton chronology
Another Ticket (1981)	Money and Cigarettes (1983)	Behind the Sun (1985)

Singles from Money and Cigarettes
- 1. "I've Got a Rock 'n' Roll Heart" Released: January 1983; 2. "The Shape You're In" Released: April 1983

Money and Cigarettes is the eighth solo studio album by Eric Clapton, recorded after his first rehabilitation from alcoholism. Produced by Clapton and Tom Dowd with, apart from Albert Lee, a new backing band of veteran session musicians including Donald "Duck" Dunn, Roger Hawkins, and Ry Cooder. The album was moderately successful commercially, reaching Top 20 chart positions in several countries. Critical reception was lukewarm.

== Background ==
The cover depicts Clapton, cigarette in hand, standing next to a melting Fender Stratocaster guitar. Clapton chose the name of the album "because that's all I saw myself having left" after his first rehabilitation from alcoholism. After finishing a North American tour, Clapton and his touring band consisting of Henry Spinetti, Gary Brooker, Chris Stainton and Dave Markee went into the Compass Point Studios in Nassau, Bahamas, to record tracks for a new studio album. Listening to the new recordings, Clapton recalled, the songs have got a "pub atmosphere" and represent a "continuation of his work with Ronnie Lane". Producer Tom Dowd, however, was not pleased with the recordings and the sound of Clapton's band, asking Eric to change his band, except for Albert Lee. Clapton changed his band to the line-up as it is presented on the album's liner notes and suffered from multiple collapses during the recording sessions.

== Chart performance ==
The album was commercially quite successful, reaching Top 10 chart positions in two countries, followed by four positions in the album charts Top 20. In Germany, Money and Cigarettes positioned itself on number 22 on the charts compiled by Gfk Entertainment. In the Netherlands and the United States, the album ranked on position 16. In the United Kingdom and New Zealand, the album peaked at number 13 and 11 on the nations' official music charts. Reaching peak position five on the Sverigetopplistan chart, the album became of one Clapton's highest-charting releases in Sweden. In Norway, Money and Cigarettes peaked at number three, making it the highest position for the release.

== Critical reception ==
Professional ratings
Review scores
Source	Rating
AllMusic	3/5 stars
Robert Christgau	B+
Rolling Stone	3.5/5 stars

In his review for AllMusic, William Ruhlmann notes that "Money and Cigarettes marked several important turning points in Eric Clapton's recording career: It was his debut release on his own Duck imprint within Warner Bros.' Reprise Records subsidiary. It was also the first album he made after coming to terms with his drinking problem by giving up alcohol. Newly focused and having written a batch of new songs, he became dissatisfied with his longtime band and fired them, with the exception of second guitarist Albert Lee. In their place, he hired session pros like Stax Records veteran bassist Donald "Duck" Dunn and Muscle Shoals drummer Roger Hawkins, also bringing in guest guitarist Ry Cooder." Finishing his analysis, the critic summed the album up, "For all the changes and the high-powered sidemen, though, Money and Cigarettes ended up being just an average effort from Clapton."

Rolling Stone critic David Fricke rates the album with 3.5 out of five possible stars and concludes: "Like most of Clapton's recent solo records, Money and Cigarettes makes no claim to greatness. Still, the simple, unaffected blues power at work here is surprising and refreshing. As the chorus in Clapton's cover of Johnny Otis' 1958 party rocker "Crazy Country Hop" goes: 'Ooh wee oh oh ooh la la/Let's rock & roll.' On Money and Cigarettes, Clapton offers no more and gives no less." Critic Robert Christgau rates the album with a "B+."

== Track listing ==
Side one
No.	Title	Writer(s)	Length
1.	"Everybody Oughta Make a Change"	Sleepy John Estes	3:16
2.	"The Shape You're In"	Eric Clapton	4:08
3.	"Ain't Going Down"	Eric Clapton	4:01
4.	"I've Got a Rock 'n' Roll Heart"	Troy Seals, Eddie Setser, Steve Diamond	3:13
5.	"Man Overboard"	Eric Clapton	3:45

Side two
No.	Title	Writer(s)	Length
6.	"Pretty Girl"	Eric Clapton	5:29
7.	"Man In Love"	Eric Clapton	2:46
8.	"Crosscut Saw"	R.G. Ford	3:30
9.	"Slow Down Linda"	Eric Clapton	4:14
10.	"Crazy Country Hop"	Johnny Otis	2:46

== Personnel ==
- Eric Clapton – lead vocals, electric guitar, slide guitar
- Albert Lee – acoustic guitar, electric guitar, keyboards, backing vocals
- Ry Cooder – electric guitar, slide guitar
- Peter Solley – Hammond organ
- Donald Dunn – bass guitar
- Roger Hawkins – drums
- Chuck Kirkpatrick – backing vocals
- John Sambataro – backing vocals

== Production ==
- Producers – Tom Dowd and Eric Clapton
- Engineers – Tom Dowd and Michael Carnavale
- Assistant Engineer – Dennis Halliburton
- Mastered by Mike Fuller at Criteria Studios (Miami, FL).
- Art Direction – El & Nel Ink., Graham Hughes
- Photography – Graham Hughes
- Design – El & Nel Ink., Ian Murray
- Model Maker – Laurie Savage
- Typography and Design – Ian Murray Acrobat Design

== Charts ==
=== Weekly charts ===
Chart (1983)	Peak position
Australian Albums (Kent Music Report)	20
Canada Top Albums/CDs (RPM)	17
Dutch Albums (Album Top 100)	16
German Albums (Offizielle Top 100)	22
Italian Albums (Musica e Dischi)	22
Japanese Albums (Oricon)	9
New Zealand Albums (RMNZ)	11
Norwegian Albums (VG-lista)	3
Swedish Albums (Sverigetopplistan)	5
UK Albums (Official Charts)	13
US Billboard 200	16

=== Year-end charts ===
Chart (1983)	Position
Dutch Albums (MegaCharts)	73
