= Rock Candy (album) =

Studio album by Orianthi
- Released: 14 October 2022
- Studio: Blackbird Studios, Nashville, Tennessee
- Length: 30:55
- Label: Frontier
- Producer: Jacob Bunton

Orianthi chronology
Live from Hollywood (2022)	Rock Candy (2022)

Singles from Rock Candy
- 1. "Light It Up" Released: 27 July 2022; 2. "Fire Together" Released: 7 September 2022

Rock Candy is the fifth studio album by Australian guitarist, singer and songwriter Orianthi. It was released on 14 October 2022 through Frontiers Records. The album's lead single "Light It Up" was released on 27 July 2022. The album is Orianthi's second release in 2022, following Live from Hollywood, a live CD/DVD and Blu-ray.

== Background ==
On January 8, Orianthi recorded Live from Hollywood, a live CD/DVD. It was released on 15 July 2022 and serves as an appetiser for the upcoming album.

During an interview Orianthi revealed that the record was done and it took twelve days to complete it while working with her good friend Jacob Bunton. The two of them wrote one song and recorded one song a day for the album. In the same interview she announced that she was planning to make a blues-pop record but her label wanted something heavy. "We went for the heavy aspect because that's what the label wanted. Also, I think some of the fans wanted that, too."

== Promotion ==
In March 2022 Orianthi announced the title for Rock Candy for the first time on her social media pages. In June 2022 the singer announced that she would be shooting two music videos, back to back, for the first two singles from the album. On 27 July 2022 the first single, "Light It Up", was released along with its music video. The second single, "Fire Together" was released 7 September 2022.

== Track listing ==
All tracks are written by Orianthi Panagaris and Jacob Bunton, except where noted.

Rock Candy track listing
No.	Title	Writer(s)	Length
1.	"Illuminate (Part I)"		0:56
2.	"Light It Up"		3:48
3.	"Fire Together"	Panagaris; Ruslin Odnoralov; Steve Diamond	3:23
4.	"Where Did Your Heart Go"		2:57
5.	"Red Light"		2:45
6.	"Void"		3:24
7.	"Burning"		2:48
8.	"Living Is Like Dying Without You"	Panagaris; Bunton; Richie Sambora	3:59
9.	"Witches & the Devil"		1:59
10.	"Getting to Me"	Panagaris; Bunton; Mischke	2:52
11.	"Illuminate (Part II)"		2:04
Total length:			30:55

== Charts ==
Chart performance for Rock Candy
Chart (2022)	Peak position
Japanese Hot Albums (Billboard Japan)	72
Swiss Albums (Schweizer Hitparade)	63
UK Album Downloads (OCC)	49
UK Independent Albums (OCC)	40
UK Rock & Metal Albums (OCC)	17
