= Sweet Lies (Ellie Campbell song) =

Single by Ellie Campbell

from the album Ellie
- B-side: "The Things You Do"
- Released: March 1999
- Genre: Pop
- Length: 3:52
- Label: Jive Records; Eastern Bloc Records
- Songwriter(s): Mark Topham; Karl Twigg; Lance Ellington
- Producer(s): Pete Waterman; Mark Topham; Karl Twigg

Ellie Campbell singles chronology
"Sweet Lies" (1999)	"So Many Ways" (1999)

"Sweet Lies" is the debut single by British singer Ellie Campbell. The song was released in March 1999 and peaked at number 43 on the UK Singles Chart.

== Track listing ==
UK single (0519222)

1. "Sweet Lies" - 3:52
2. "The Things You Do" - 4:25
3. "Sweet Lies" (Slow, WIP and Grind Mix) - 5:04

== Charts ==
Chart (1999)	Peak position
United Kingdom (Official Charts Company)	42
