= Ellie Campbell =

British singer

Ellie Campbell is a British singer. She released four singles and an album between 1999 and 2001. Initially winning a GMTV contest to find a new singer, Campbell released her debut single "Sweet Lies" in March 1999, the single reached #42 in the UK Singles Chart. In August 1999, Ellie released her second single "So Many Ways", which became her biggest hit, reaching #26 in the charts. Her third and final European single, "Don't Want You Back", peaked at #50 in January 2001 in the UK.

Campbell was sometimes compared to Britney Spears. Her debut album, Ellie, was released in 2001. The album proved to be unsuccessful, it failed to chart in the UK, though it charted at #192 in Australia.

A cover of Dee Dee Warwick's "You're No Good" was due to be the fourth single in the UK, but plans were shelved, despite a music video being shot. The single did get a release in the United States, but failed to chart.

In Australia, "Don't Want You Back" reached #44 in 2001, and was in the charts for five weeks. "You're No Good" was released later that year. In the Netherlands, her single "So Many Ways" stayed in the Dutch Top 100 for 5 weeks.

== Discography ==
=== Albums ===
Title	Album details
Ellie	Released: 11 June 2001; Label: Jive (ZRA 9201362); Formats: CD

=== Singles ===
Year	Song	Chart peak positions		
Year	Song	UK	AUS	NL
1999	"Sweet Lies"	42	–	–
1999	"So Many Ways"	26	227	84
2000	"Don't Want You Back"	50	44	–
2001	"You're No Good"	–	104	–
