= Live from Hollywood =

Live album by Orianthi
- Released: 15 July 2022
- Label: Frontiers
- Producer: Drew Dempsey

Orianthi chronology
O (2020)	Live from Hollywood (2022)

Live from Hollywood is the first live album/DVD by Australian guitarist, singer and songwriter Orianthi. It was released on 15 July 2022 by Frontiers Records. The release features performances filmed at the Bourbon Room in Hollywood, California on 8 January 2022. This live album consists mostly of live rendition from Orianthi's fourth studio album O and other fan favorites such as "According to You".

== Background and release ==
In December 2021 Orianthi took to social media to announce that she would be shooting a live DVD at the Bourbon Room in Los Angeles. Seventeen songs were performed during the show, but only eleven made it onto the live release. In an interview with VWMusic the Australian singer explained that the songs that were picked for the album are the songs that the fans requested her to play at the show when she announced it on social media.

In May 2022 Frontiers released the live performance of "Contagious" to promote the release. The song serves as the opening track from the live album/DVD. The following month the live performance for "Sinners Hymn" was premiered. On release day the live version of "According to You" was released.

== Critical reception ==
Mike O'Cull from Rock & Blues Muse commented positively on Orianthi's performance, stating that "Orianthi distinguishes herself all over Live In Hollywood, playing and singing with iconoclastic boldness, grace, and power." Metal Digest gave the CD/DVD an 80%, praising that the release is a "beautiful, intimate performance".

== Track listing ==
Live from Hollywood track listing
No.	Title	Writer(s)	Length
1.	"Contagious"	Orianthi Panagaris, Martin H Frederiksen	5:00
2.	"Sinners Hymn"	Panagaris, Frederiksen	4:22
3.	"Heaven in This Hell"	Panagaris, David A. Stewart, Gavin Brown, John Feldmann	5:19
4.	"Think Like a Man"	Panagaris, Martin Briley, Dana Calitri, Nina Ossoff	4:41
5.	"You Don't Wanna Know"	Panagaris, Zac Maloy, Clint Lagerberg	5:47
6.	"What's It Gonna Be"	Panagaris, Jimmy Messer	3:15
7.	"Blow"	Panagaris, Frederiksen	4:37
8.	"Impulsive"	Panagaris, Frederiksen	6:03
9.	"Blues Won't Leave Me Alone"	Panagaris, Richie Sambora	6:32
10.	"According to You"	Steve Diamond, Andrew Frampton	3:37
11.	"How Do You Sleep"	Panagaris, Stewart	7:07

== Charts ==
Chart performance for Live from Hollywood
Chart (2022)	Peak position
Swiss Albums (Schweizer Hitparade)	86
