= Heaven in This Hell =

Studio album by Orianthi
- Released: 12 March 2013
- Recorded: 2011–2013
- Studio: Blackbird Studios, Nashville, Tennessee
- Genre: Hard rock, blues rock, country rock
- Length: 41:26
- Label: Robo Records
- Producer: David A. Stewart

Orianthi chronology
Believe (2009)	Heaven in This Hell (2013)	The Best of Orianthi, Vol. 1 (2014)

Singles from Heaven in This Hell
- 1. "Frozen" Released: 7 February 2013; 2. "Sex E Bizarre" Released: 3 September 2013; 3. "Better with You" Released: 29 March 2014

Professional ratings
Review scores
Source	Rating
AllMusic	3/5 stars
AltSounds	53%
ThisIsNotAScene	8/10 stars

Heaven in This Hell is the third studio album by Australian singer and guitarist Orianthi. Produced by David A. Stewart, the album was released on Robo Records on 12 March 2013. Orianthi cited modern country and blues as the main inspirations on the album's sound on an interview for Guitar World in January 2013. A deluxe version with three extra tracks was released on 3 September 2013.

== Track listing ==
Heaven in This Hell track listing
No.	Title	Writer(s)	Length
1.	"Heaven in This Hell"	Orianthi Panagaris, David A. Stewart, Gavin Brown, John Feldmann	4:32
2.	"You Don't Wanna Know"	Panagaris, Zac Maloy, Clint Lagerberg	3:40
3.	"Fire"	Panagaris, Stewart	2:53
4.	"If U Think U Know Me"	Panagaris, Stewart	3:35
5.	"How Do You Sleep?"	Panagaris, Stewart	4:14
6.	"Frozen"	Panagaris, Kevin Griffin	3:40
7.	"Rock"	Panagaris, Stewart, Brian Chiusano	4:34
8.	"Another You"	Panagaris, Blair Daly, Bobbie Huff	3:43
9.	"How Does That Feel?"	Panagaris, Stewart	3:08
10.	"Filthy Blues"	Panagaris, Stewart	3:17
11.	"If You Were Here with Me"	Panagaris, Stewart	4:10
Total length:			41:26

International digital bonus track
No.	Title	Length
12.	"Better with You"	2:57

Japanese bonus track
No.	Title	Length
13.	"Sex E Bizarre" (featuring Steven Tyler)	3:08

Deluxe edition bonus tracks
No.	Title	Length
12.	"Sex E Bizarre" (featuring Steven Tyler)	3:08
13.	"Better with You"	2:57
14.	"Another You" (alt. radio mix)	3:43

== Fire EP ==
Five of the songs from Heaven in This Hell were previously released on Fire, Orianthi's first EP. Fire was produced by David A. Stewart, and released independently on 13 October 2011.

=== Track listing ===
No.	Title	Length
1.	"Fire"	2:53
2.	"How Does It Feel?"	3:07
3.	"How Do You Sleep?"	4:14
4.	"Heaven in This Hell"	4:33
5.	"If You Were Here With Me"	4:10

== Personnel ==
Per liner notes.

- Orianthi – vocals, lead guitar, rhythm guitar, acoustic guitar, nylon string guitar, bass, 12 string guitar, banjo, foot stomps
- Tom Bukovac – guitars
- Michael Rhodes – bass
- Dan Dugmore – lap steel guitar
- Chad Cromwell – drums
- Mike Rojas – piano
- Jimmy Z. – harmonica
- Drea Rhenee – backing vocals
- Wendy Moten – backing vocals
- Shannon Forest – drums

Recording personnel

- David A. Stewart – producer, rhythm guitar
- Rob Christie – additional piano
- Ned Douglas – engineer
- John McBride – mixing
- Nathan Yarborough – assistant engineer
- Leland Elliott – assistant engineer
- Lowell Reynolds – assistant engineer

== Chart positions ==
Chart performance for Heaven in This Hell
Chart (2013)	Peak position
Japanese Albums (Oricon)	38
US Independent Albums (Billboard)	35
