= According to You =

Single by Orianthi

from the album Believe
- Released: 6 October 2009
- Recorded: 2008
- Genre: Pop rock; hard rock
- Length: 3:19
- Label: Geffen
- Songwriters: Steve Diamond; Andrew Frampton
- Producer: Howard Benson

Orianthi singles chronology
"According to You" (2009)	"Shut Up & Kiss Me" (2010)

Music video
- "According to You" on YouTube

"According to You" is the debut single by Australian guitarist and singer Orianthi from her second studio album, Believe. The song was written by Andrew Frampton and Steve Diamond, and produced by Howard Benson. It was released in Australia on 6 October 2009. As it quickly gained popularity, the song was sent to mainstream radio stations in the United States and Canada in November 2009, later making impact at the rhythmic and adult contemporary formats. "According to You" was released in the United Kingdom on 6 September 2010.

The song received acclaim from music critics, who praised her vocal and instrumental talent. The song was also a commercial success, reaching the top 10 in Australia and Japan and the top 20 in the United States. It was also certified Platinum in both territories. "According to You" also charted in Canada, New Zealand, and the United Kingdom. A radio hit, the song reached the top three on the Billboard Pop Songs chart and also appeared on the Adult Contemporary, Adult Pop Songs, and Rhythmic charts.

The song was also made available as a downloadable content for the Rock Band series on 4 May 2010, and as a playable song in Guitar Hero Live.

== Composition ==
"According to You" is a pop rock song with hard rock-styled instrumentation and with a duration of three minutes and nineteen seconds (3:19). It was written by Steve Diamond and Andrew Frampton, and was produced by Howard Benson. According to the digital sheet music published by Kobalt Music Publishing, the song was originally composed in the key of F major and set in common time to an energetic tempo of 130 BPM. Orianthi's vocals span approximately one-and-a-half octaves, from F_{3} through C_{5}.

The song opens on a soft keyboard riff, which is quickly accompanied by "chugging" power chords on guitar. Orianthi's vocal style on the song has been described as "lively" and has been compared favourably to that of American pop rock artist Kelly Clarkson. The climax of the song is punctuated by a metal guitar solo reminiscent of 1980s pop rock music. Lyrically, "According to You" finds the narrator explaining to an ex-lover all of the differences between him and her new lover, with its hook summarizing that the new man in her life loves her for "everything I'm not, according to you."

== Critical reception ==
The song received generally positive reviews from critics, who noted her talent as both a guitarist and vocalist. Matt Collar of AllMusic praised Orianthi's guitar playing and "gutsy" vocal, describing the song as "one of the poppiest, catchiest radio-friendly" tracks since Kelly Clarkson's "Since U Been Gone" in 2004. Michael Menachem of Billboard wrote that the production, lyrics, and performance all complement one another and suggested that Orianthi's "combination of high-energy, emotive delivery and masterful fret work" could inspire more women to pursue the guitar. In a review of the song's parent album, Believe, Sputnikmusic's Davey Boy wrote that the song's instrumentals "put most radio-rock bands to shame" and called the song catchy. Nick Levine of Digital Spy gave the song five stars and described it as a "whopper of a tune" and a "guilty pleasure."

== Music video ==
An accompanying music video was directed by Marc Klasfeld and begins with Orianthi alone in her bedroom with a guitar for the opening lines of the song. The video then follows her to a photo shoot, a house party where her band is playing and two concerts, as well as a gray room where she is alone during her guitar solos. The video ends as a bookend of the beginning, with her alone again in her room as she plays guitar to herself. It premiered 1 December 2009.

A guitar arm is attached to the camera and is seen throughout the video and is being played by someone as if they are playing Guitar Hero. The video can be watched and played along to on GHTV section of Guitar Hero Live.

== Track listing ==
CD single
No.	Title	Writer(s)	Length
1.	"According to You"	Steve Diamond; Andrew Frampton	3:19
2.	"Find It"	Orianthi Panagaris; Phil Buckle	4:06
Total length:			7:25

Digital download – remix
No.	Title	Length
1.	"According to You" (The Jason Sangerman Remix)	3:38

== Charts ==
=== Weekly charts ===
Weekly chart performance for "According to You"
Chart (2009–2010)	Peak position
Australia (ARIA)	8
Canada Hot 100 (Billboard)	22
Canada CHR/Top 40 (Billboard)	11
Canada Hot AC (Billboard)	8
Japan Hot 100 (Billboard)	3
New Zealand (Recorded Music NZ)	39
UK Singles (Official Charts Company)	159
US Billboard Hot 100	17
US Adult Contemporary (Billboard)	24
US Adult Pop Airplay (Billboard)	6
US Pop Airplay (Billboard)	3
US Rhythmic Airplay (Billboard)	36

=== Year-end charts ===
2009 year-end chart performance for "According to You"
Chart (2009)	Position
Australian Singles Chart	95
Australian Artists Singles	21

2010 year-end chart performance for "According to You"
Chart (2010)	Position
Canadian Hot 100	90
Japan Hot 100	31
Japanese Adult Contemporary Chart	12
US Billboard Hot 100	55
US Adult Pop Songs (Billboard)	24
US Pop Songs (Billboard)	27
US Radio Songs (Billboard)	50

== Certifications ==
Certifications and sales for "According to You"
Region	Certification	Certified units/sales
Australia (ARIA)	Platinum	70,000^{^}
United States (RIAA)	Platinum	1,000,000^{*}
^{*} Sales figures based on certification alone.^{^} Shipments figures based on certification alone.

== Release history ==
Release dates for "According to You"
Country	Date	Format	Label	Ref.
Australia	6 October 2009	Digital download	Geffen	
United Kingdom	16 October 2009	Digital download	Geffen	
Japan	3 November 2009	CD single	Geffen	
United States	3 November 2009	Contemporary hit radio	Geffen; 19	
Various	16 February 2010	Digital download – remix	Geffen	
United Kingdom	6 September 2010	CD single	Polydor	
Various	14 September 2010	CD single	Geffen	
