= Mass Production (band) =

American funk and disco group

Mass Production is an American funk/disco musical group, best known for their 1979 hit, "Firecracker." Based in Norfolk, Virginia, the ten-piece group had a series of minor R&B hits in the late 1970s and early 1980s. "Firecracker" is commonly misattributed to the similarly named (and sonically/stylistically similar) band Brass Construction.

== History ==
The band consisted of Kevin "D'No" Douglas (bass and vocals), James "Otiste" Drumgole (trumpet, flugelhorn, clarinet, flute, piccolo and vocals), Agnes "Tiny" Kelly (lead vocals, vocoder; later replaced by Dee (DeeDee) Henderson), George Jefferson (trombone), Larry Marshall (lead vocals, triangle, percussion and xylophone), Gregory “Sagittarius” McCoy (saxophone, tuba, bassoon and kazoo), Emmanuel Redding (percussion, kettle drums and marimba), Ricardo Williams (lead vocals, drums, percussion), Tyrone Williams (keyboards), Rodney Phelps (lead guitar, keyboards) and LeCoy Bryant (rhythm guitar, vocals). Phelps left the band prior to the recording of their 1980 Massterpiece album, leaving Bryant to handle all guitar duties. Phelps was later replaced by Dan Harris (lead guitar). Harris toured with the group as a freelance guitarist for a couple of years, then left the band to work as a recording session musician. The band would soon expand back to ten, with Samuel Williams joining on drums in the early 1980s, allowing Ricardo Williams to concentrate more on vocals.

In addition to "Firecracker," which hit number four on the R&B chart in the late summer of 1979, other hits by the band include "Cosmic Lust", "Groove Me", “Shanté” and "Turn Up the Music." The group stayed together for several more years, scoring a string of small hits, before deciding to disband in 1983. At that time, the group’s popularity was such that they were the only people who knew they had disbanded.

Mass Production has recently reunited with the mostly original lineup, is in the process of recording new material, and has been playing live shows since 2017.

"Firecracker" was sampled by 2 Live Crew for their 1989 hit single "Me So Horny", from their album As Nasty As They Wanna Be.

== Discography ==
=== Studio albums ===
- Welcome to Our World (1976)
- Believe (1977)
- Three Miles High (1978)
- In the Purest Form (1979)
- Massterpiece (1980)
- Turn Up the Music (1981)
- In a City Groove (1982)
- '83 (1983)

=== Compilation album ===
- Firecrackers: The Best of Mass Production (1996)

== See also ==
- List of funk musicians
- Cotillion Records
