= Orianthi =

Australian musician, singer and songwriter (born 1985)

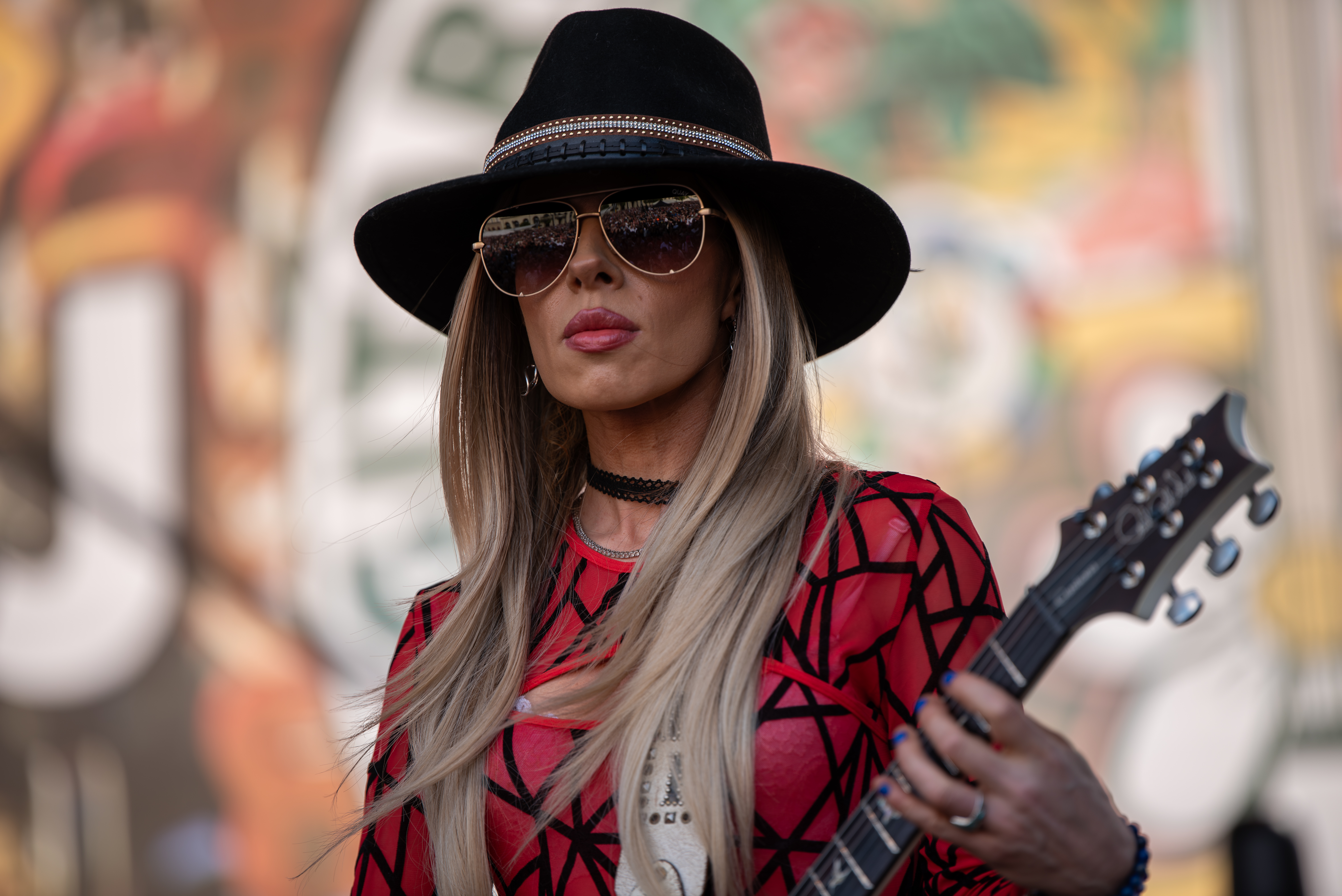
- Orianthi performing in 2025
- Born: Orianthi Penny Panagaris; 22 January 1985 (age 41); Adelaide, South Australia, Australia
- Occupations: Musician; singer; songwriter
- Years active: 1999–present
- Partner: Richie Sambora (2014–2018)
- Musical career
- Genres: Pop rock; hard rock; alternative rock; pop punk; blues rock; alternative metal
- Instruments: Guitar; vocals
- Labels: Frontiers; Robo; Geffen; Spinefarm; 19
- Website: orianthi.me

Orianthi Penny Panagaris (born 22 January 1985), known mononymously as Orianthi, is an Australian guitarist, singer and songwriter. She has been a touring guitarist for several known musical acts, most notably Michael Jackson for his cancelled This Is It concert residency.

Her 2009 debut single "According to You" peaked at No. 3 in Japan, No. 8 in Australia and No. 17 in the US; her second album, Believe, received a worldwide release in late 2009. The same year, she was named one of the "12 Greatest Female Electric Guitarists" by Elle magazine. She also won the "2010 Breakthrough Guitarist of the Year" award hosted by Guitar International magazine.

== Life and career ==
=== Early life ===
Orianthi Penny Panagaris was born in Adelaide, Australia, to a Greek father. She began playing piano at the age of three, and at the encouragement of her father, moved to acoustic guitar at the age of six. When she was eleven, she took up electric guitar and left her school, Mercedes College, enrolling at Cabra Dominican College. She also attended St Peter's Collegiate Girls' School for a short period. At the age of 15, she turned her focus to writing songs and so began her professional career. She has been playing in bands since the age of 14 and performed in her first stage show for Steve Vai at the age of 15. Orianthi met and jammed with Carlos Santana when she was 18. He invited Orianthi to get up and jam with him at soundcheck then later asked if she would join him on stage that night to jam at his Adelaide concert, Memorial Drive on 30 March 2003.

Orianthi independently released her debut studio album, Violet Journey in 2005, composing all the material, contributing guitar, vocals, and drums on most cuts. She produced and mixed the final product at her home studio. Carlos Santana brought Orianthi to Paul Reed Smith's attention which led to her endorsement. Orianthi relocated to Los Angeles, signed with Geffen Records in late 2006 and struck a management deal with 19 Entertainment.

Orianthi has made a commercial for Panasonic, featured in the song "Now or Never" for Bratz: The Movie, played at the Eric Clapton Crossroads Guitar Festival, appeared in The New York Times business section promoting eco-friendly acoustic guitars, and opened for Steve Vai in the US.

=== Breakthrough ===
Orianthi appeared at the 51st annual Grammy Awards in February 2009 as Carrie Underwood's lead guitarist, with Underwood inviting Orianthi to become a member of her band. Following that performance (in addition to recommendations from industry professionals), Michael Jackson's management reached out to Orianthi for an audition for This Is It concerts. Orianthi was hence Michael Jackson's lead guitarist and was present at all rehearsals for his This Is It concerts before his death. In regard to being handpicked by Jackson, she stated:

I don't know exactly why he picked me, but he watched my YouTube videos and loved them. He had his choice of guitar players, but I came in and played the 'Beat It' solo for him. Afterward he was so happy he got up and grabbed my arm and started walking up and down the stage area with me. He said, 'Can you play once for me?' and hired me that night. I wish he was still around. He made me believe in myself more, and I learned so much. Going into it, I thought it would be all about playing guitar solos. But the majority of it was playing chords and funky rhythms.

She played and sang at Jackson's memorial, globally televised live on 7 July 2009. She appears in the film Michael Jackson's This Is It, which chronicles the rehearsals for the tour and shows her and Jackson on stage. She presented an award at the 2009 American Music Awards, which Jackson won posthumously. Orianthi also appears on "We Are the World 25 for Haiti" – with the original co-written and partly performed by Jackson. She plays guitar on "Monster", a song credited to Michael Jackson featuring 50 Cent, which was released on the 2010 edition of Michael on 14 December 2010. It was removed along with two other songs from the Michael album on digital editions on 29 June 2022 and on physical editions on 9 September 2022 due to their false authenticity of Jackson's vocals.

=== Solo career ===
Orianthi started working on her major label debut Believe in 2007, which was released in October 2009. The album produced the worldwide hit "According to You", which was the Single of the Week on iTunes on 27 October 2009, reached number 2 on US radio airplay and charted to number eight in Australia, three in Japan, and achieved platinum status in the US and Australia. The charismatic rock instrumental "Highly Strung" featuring Steve Vai became a popular YouTube video with millions of views and climbing, and her song "Suffocated" was featured on Guitar Hero: Warriors of Rock as a playable song.

Orianthi appeared on several late-night shows; most notably, she appeared on American Idol results show, which aired on 26 March 2010. In 2010, she toured extensively, with headlining shows in the US, Japan, Australia, and Malaysia. She also opened for other artists including John Mayer, Mika, Daughtry and over 30 dates for Adam Lambert's Glam Nation Tour with former Idol contestant Allison Iraheta. Orianthi performed at various music festivals and charity functions most notably at the Stand Up to Cancer telethon.

On 12 October 2011, the 5 track EP Fire, produced by Dave Stewart was released as an iTunes download. Five songs from the EP appeared on Orianthi's third studio album, Heaven in This Hell. The album was released on 12 March 2013.

In 2020 Orianthi signed an exclusive record deal with rock label Frontiers Records. "The album O was released on 6 November 2020, making it her first studio album in seven years. Marti Frederiksen produced the album and was preceded by the single "Sinners Hymn". Two other songs from the album, "Impulsive" and "Sorry", were released as singles and had music videos.

In January 2022 Orianthi announced that a live DVD and album would be released later in the year through Frontiers Records. In March she shared the title for her fifth album, Rock Candy. On 15 July 2022, Live from Hollywood was released on CD/DVD and Blu-ray. The performance was captured on 8 January 2022 at the Bourbon Room in Hollywood. Rock Candy was then released on 14 October.

In 2024 Orianthi released the single "First Time Blues" (featuring Joe Bonamassa).

On 17 June 2025 Orianthi released Some Kind of Feeling on Woodward Avenue Records. The first single from the new record was "Attention" which was released on 16 May 2025 and had an accompanying music video.

=== Collaborations ===
Orianthi has been prolific in collaborating and being featured by many artists. She is featured on Iraheta's third single "Don't Waste the Pretty" and on Fefe Dobson's song "Can't Breathe" which appears on Fefe Dobson's album Joy released in November 2010. She has stated that the people she has collaborated with (i.e. Allison Iraheta and Lacey Mosley) are some of her best friends.

She recorded for the song "Sadda Haq" composed by Academy award-winning composer A. R. Rahman for a Bollywood 2011 film soundtrack Rockstar. The song became very popular and garnered substantial media coverage in India for Orianthi, being cited for her time as Michael Jackson's lead guitarist.

Orianthi joined supergroup Hollywood Vampires on the track "Whole Lotta Love" from the band's 2015 self-titled debut album.

Richie Sambora announced in early 2015 that he was working on a new album in collaboration with fellow musician and girlfriend Orianthi.

In October 2016, Orianthi featured in the 2016 NRL Grand Final pre-game entertainment alongside Sambora. Their performance was met with mixed reviews, and Sambora defended their performance the following day on Twitter.

On 29 September 2017, Orianthi and Richie Sambora released a five-song EP called Rise under the name RSO (an acronym of the two members' initials). They released another EP Making History on 15 December 2017, and their debut album Radio Free America was released on 11 May 2018. The band performed on the 5th episode of Season 11 of the PBS performance series Soundstage, which premiered on 3 May 2018.

Orianthi appears on the track "Limelight" from Don Felder's album American Rock 'n' Roll, released in April 2019.

=== Touring guitarist ===
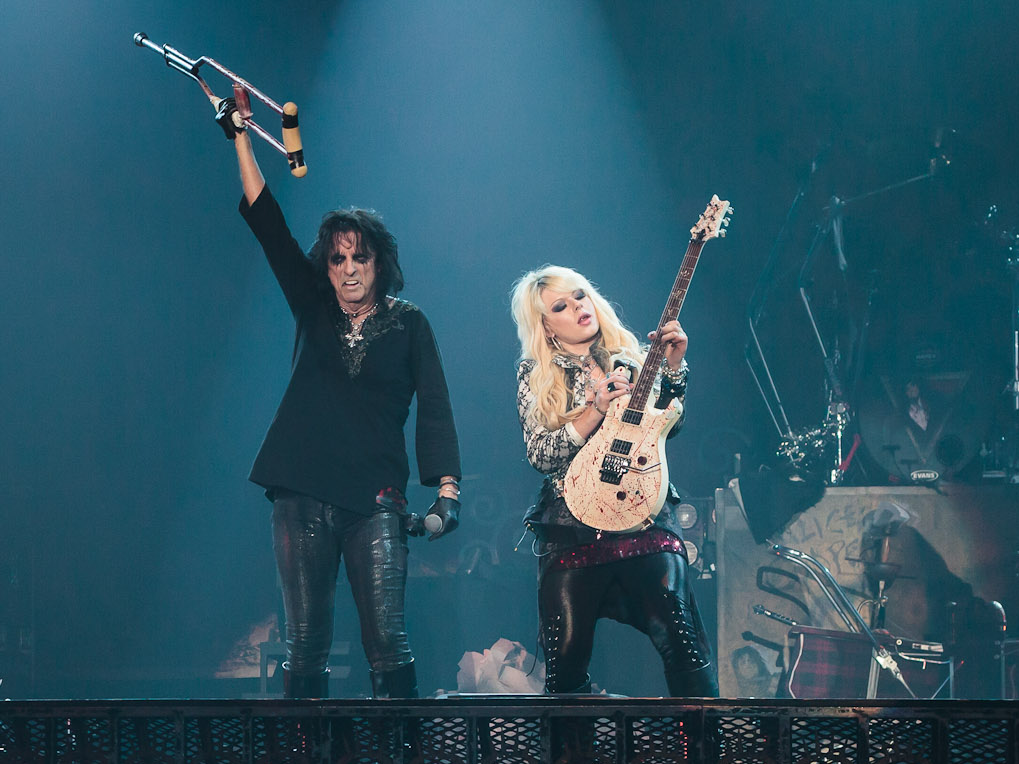
Orianthi performing with Alice Cooper during Alice Cooper's Halloween Night of Horror in 2012

On 29 August 2011, Orianthi was announced as Alice Cooper's new guitarist. She replaced Damon Johnson, who is now a member of Thin Lizzy. She was the first female member of the Alice Cooper band. Orianthi did two world tours with Alice Cooper, but resigned in June 2014, and was replaced by Nita Strauss. Her departure caused a rift between her and Strauss' respective fanbases, though the guitarists themselves are friends.

Orianthi has appeared as a guitarist for other stars including shows with Michael Bolton, Dave Stewart and James Durbin. She also appeared on the Top 7-week season 12 of American Idol on 3 April 2013 to play guitar for each of the performances. One month later Orianthi performed Fine China with Chris Brown at the 2013 Billboard Music Awards, and on 8 December of that same year she paid tribute to Carlos Santana, performing in the Kennedy Center Honors Gala.

She spent most of 2013–2015 touring with Dave Stewart, started BeMyBand, and released a song. In 2014, she joined Sambora for his solo tour in Australia and Europe. In 2016, the two toured under the name RSO in Australia, South America and the UK.

In late 2024, it was announced that Orianthi would be rejoining Alice Cooper for the Too Close for Comfort Tour in February 2025 filling in for Nita Strauss who was unavailable due to other commitments, but later Orianthi had to cancel this tour because of a leg injury. Due to this injury, she performed at PRS's 40th anniversary show sitting down on stage.

In September 2026, she joined Anna Vissi at her mega concert in the Olympic Stadium of Athens, and had the opportunity to perform in front of over 95,000 people.

== Philanthropy ==
Orianthi met with Little Kids Rock students at the annual trade show for music merchants (the NAMM Show) in 2010 after they opened for her. The kids gave her an acoustic guitar they autographed and she joined LKR's Honorary Board.

In 2025, on PRS's 40th anniversary show Orianthi was on stage and played together with Dany Villarreal (lead singer and guitarist of The Warning). After their song, Orianthi gifted her PRS private stock signature guitar to Villarreal.

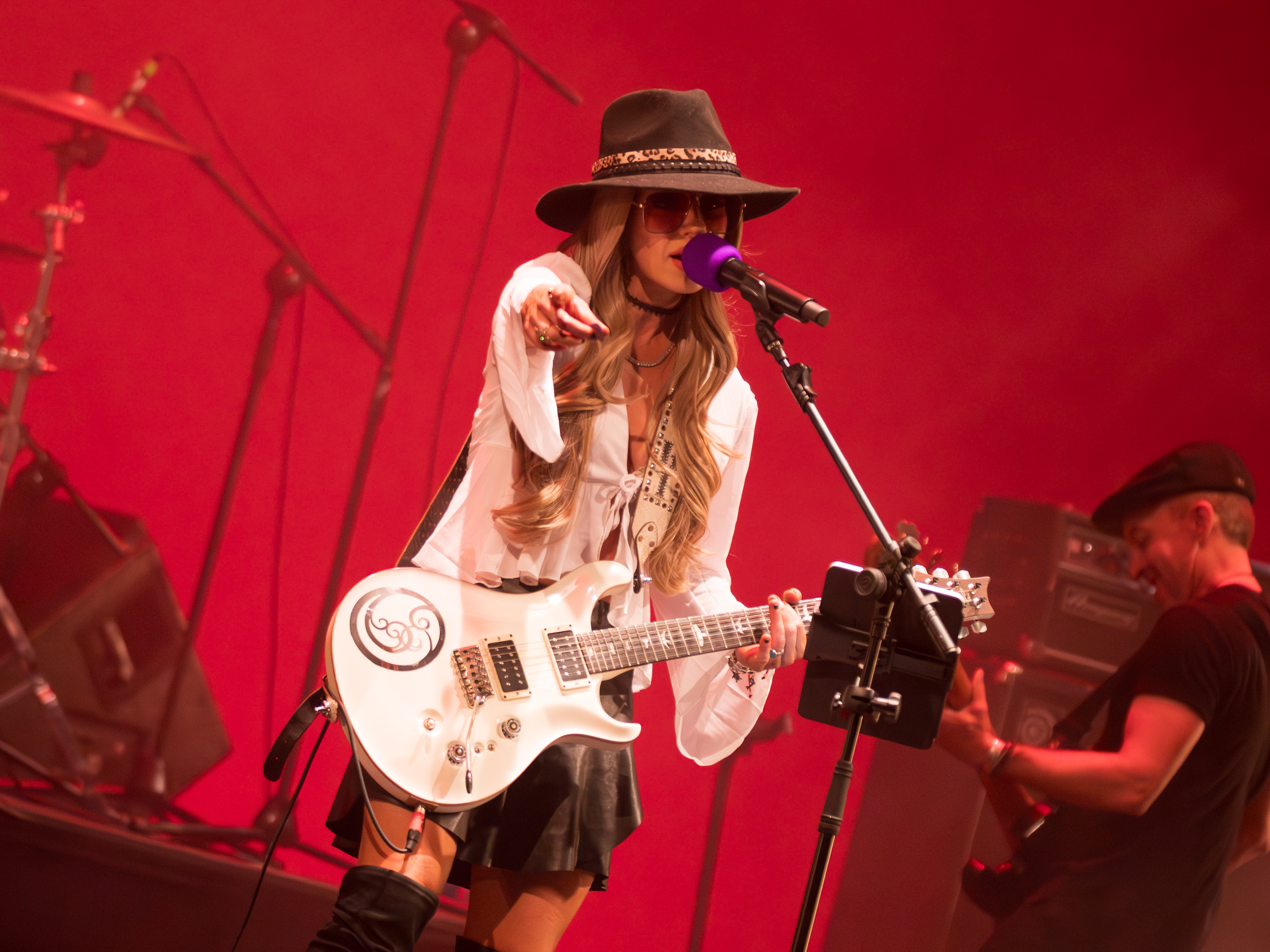
Orianthi live in Córdoba (Spain), 2024

== Discography ==
Solo career

- Believe (2009)
- Heaven in This Hell (2013)
- O (2020)
- Rock Candy (2022)
- Some Kind of Feeling (2025)

RSO

- Radio Free America (2018)

== Filmography ==
Film
Year	Film	Role	Notes
2009	Rock Prophecies	Herself	Brief appearance
2009	Michael Jackson's This Is It	Herself	Jackson's guitarist

== Awards and nominations ==
Year	Type	Award	Result
2009	Elle Magazine	12 Best Female Electric Guitar Players	Won
2010	Nickelodeon Australian Kids Choice Awards 2010	Fresh Aussie Musos	Nominated
2010	Billboard Japan Music Awards 2010	Top Pop Artist 2010	Nominated
2010	Guitar International Magazine	Breakthrough Guitarist of the Year 2010	Won
2011	25th Japan Gold Disc Award 2010	The Best 3 New Artists (International)	Won
2011	Tokio Hot 100 Awards 2010	Best New Artist	Nominated
2011	2011 BMI Pop Music Awards	Award-Winning Songs – According to You	Won
2011	Gibson Guitars	Guitar Gals: The Top 10 Female Guitar Players of All Time	Won
2013	WiMN – She Rocks Awards	Inspire Award	Won

== Equipment ==
=== Guitars ===
- PRS Custom 22
- PRS Custom 24
- PRS SE Custom 24
- PRS SE Singlecut
- Jackson KV2& KV5 (discontinued)
- Jackson DX10 (Discontinued)
- Ibanez RG Series (discontinued)
- Gibson Les Paul (early)
- Gibson SG (early)
- Garrison & Taylor Acoustics
- Duesenberg Starplayer TV, gift from Dave Stewart
- PRS SE Orianthi (her own signature SE model)

She also has a special private stock PRS Custom 24 guitar, nicknamed "MJ", made for the This Is It concerts. This one of a kind guitar is decorated with Swarovski crystals.

=== Amplifiers ===
- Orange Amplification
- ENGL (This Is It)
- EVH 5150III
- Marshall
- Mesa/Boogie
