= Traffic discography =

Cataloguing of published recordings by Traffic

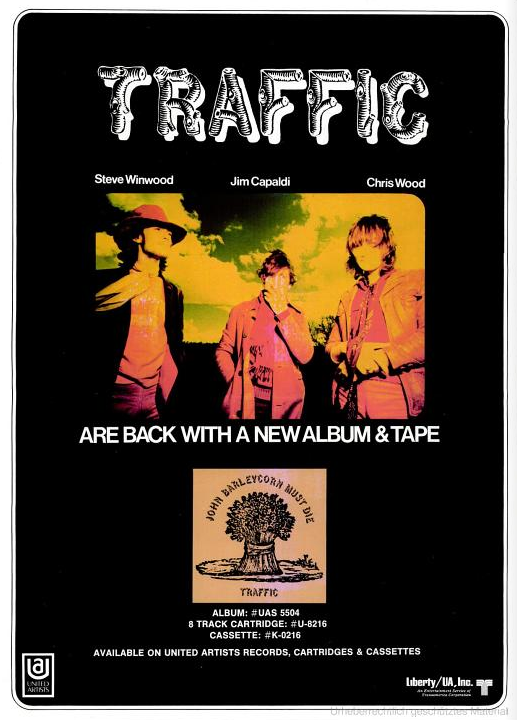
1970 trade ad for John Barleycorn Must Die

Here is the discography of the band Traffic.

== Albums ==
=== Studio albums ===
Title	Album details	Peak chart positions								Certifications
Title	Album details	UK	AUS	CAN	GER	IT	NLD	NO	US	Certifications
Mr. Fantasy	Released: December 1967; Label: Island (ILPS 9061); Format: LP; Released as Heaven Is in Your Mind in US; Released as Reaping in Canada	16	—	—	—	—	—	—	88	
Traffic	Released: 20 September 1968; Label: Island (ILPS 9081); Format: LP	9	—	15	—	—	—	—	17	
Last Exit	Released: May 1969; Label: Island (ILPS 9097); Format: LP	—	—N/a	31	—	—	—	—	19	
John Barleycorn Must Die	Released: July 1970; Label: Island (ILPS 9116); Format: LP	11	14	6	—	—	5	15	5	Gold (US)
The Low Spark of High Heeled Boys	Released: November 1971; Label: Island (ILPS 9180); Format: LP	—	38	17	48	—	—	—	7	Platinum (US)
Shoot Out at the Fantasy Factory	Released: February 1973; Label: Island (ILPS 9224); Format: LP	—	35	2	—	20	—	—	6	Gold (US)
When the Eagle Flies	Released: September 1974; Label: Island (ILPS 9273); Format: LP	31	43	16	—	—	—	—	9	Gold (US)
Far from Home	Released: 9 May 1994; Label: Virgin (CDV 2727); Format: CD	29	—	—	22	—	72	—	33	
"—" denotes releases that did not chart.

=== Live albums ===
Title	Album details	Peak chart positions			
Title	Album details	UK	AUS	CAN	US
Welcome to the Canteen	Released: September 1971; Label: Island (ILPS 9166); Format: LP	—	49	23	26
On the Road	Released: October 1973; Label: Island (ISLD 2); Format: LP	40	51	43	29
Last Great Traffic Jam	Released: 8 November 2005; Label: Epic; Format: CD/DVD	—	—	—	—
"—" denotes releases that did not chart.

=== Compilation albums ===
- Best of Traffic – 1969 US #48, AUS #12
- Heavy Traffic – 1975 US #155
- More Heavy Traffic – 1975 US #193
- Smiling Phases – 1991
- Heaven Is in Your Mind - An Introduction to Traffic – 1998 (part of Island's An Introduction To... series)
- Feelin' Alright: The Very Best of Traffic – 2000 (re-released in 2007 as The Definitive Collection, part of Universal's The Definitive Collection series)
- The Collection – 2002
- The Best of Traffic: 20th Century Masters/The Millennium Collection – 2003 (part of Universal's 20th Century Masters - The Millennium Collection series)
- Traffic Gold – 2005 (part of Universal's Gold series)

== Singles ==
Year	Title	Peak chart positions					Album
Year	Title	UK	GER	NLD	US	CAN	Album
1967	"Paper Sun"	5	—	12	94	4	N/A
1967	"Hole in My Shoe"	2	21	9	—	4	N/A
1967	"Here We Go Round the Mulberry Bush"	8	—	34	—	—	Here We Go Round the Mulberry Bush
1968	"No Face, No Name and No Number"	40	—	—	—	—	Mr. Fantasy
1968	"Feelin' Alright"	51 (Note: Chart position is from the official UK "Breakers List".)	—	20	123	—	Traffic
1968	"Medicated Goo"	—	—	—	—	—	Last Exit
1970	"Empty Pages"	—	—	—	74	53	John Barleycorn Must Die
1971	"Gimme Some Lovin' (Part 1)"	—	—	—	68	55	Welcome to the Canteen
1971	"Glad"	—	—	—	—	—	John Barleycorn Must Die
1972	"Rock and Roll Stew (Part 1)"	—	—	—	93	72	The Low Spark of High Heeled Boys
1974	"Walking in the Wind"	—	—	—	—	—	When the Eagle Flies
1994	"Here Comes a Man"	87	87	—	—	19	Far from Home
1994	"Some Kinda Woman"	81	64	—	—	62	Far from Home
"—" denotes releases that did not chart.

== Guest appearances ==
Title	Artist	Album details	Involvement
Contribution	Shawn Phillips	Released: 1970; Format: LP	"For RFK, JFK and MLK" features Winwood - piano; Capaldi - percussion; Wood - saxophone
Oh How We Danced	Jim Capaldi	Released: 1972; Format: LP	"Open Your Heart" features Winwood - organ, backing vocal; Capaldi - piano, lead vocal; Wood - saxophone; Grech - bass; Gordon - drums; Kwaku Baah - congas
Vulcan	Chris Wood	Released: 2008; Format: CD	"Moonchild Vulcan (live)" features Winwood - guitar; Capaldi - drums; Wood - saxophone; Gee - bass; Kwaku Baah - percussion
