= Smiling Phases =

Compilation album by Traffic
- Released: 19 November 1991
- Recorded: 1967–1974
- Genre: Rock and roll, psychedelic rock, progressive rock, jazz fusion
- Length: 2:02:15
- Label: Island
- Producer: Jimmy Miller; Chris Blackwell; Steve Winwood; Guy Stevens

Traffic chronology
When the Eagle Flies (1973)	Smiling Phases (1991)	Far from Home (1994)

Smiling Phases is a two-disc 1991 compilation album by British progressive & psychedelic rock band Traffic. The title is taken from a track from their 1967 debut, Mr. Fantasy, and is meant to represent the two distinct phases of the band. Disc one covers phase one, and disc two covers phase two.

There are no new tracks on Smiling Phases, however, Here We Go 'Round the Mulberry Bush, from the film of the same name, appears on a Traffic album for the first time. The extended version of Paper Sun is available in the US for the first time, as the single version was used for the American release of Mr. Fantasy.

== Track listing ==
Disc one
No.	Title	Writer(s)	Length
1.	"Paper Sun"	Jim Capaldi / Steve Winwood	4:17
2.	"Hole in My Shoe"	Dave Mason	3:04
3.	"Smiling Phases"	Capaldi / Winwood / Chris Wood	2:41
4.	"Heaven Is in Your Mind"	Capaldi / Winwood / Wood	4:17
5.	"Coloured Rain"	Capaldi / Winwood / Wood	3:26
6.	"No Face, No Name, No Number"	Capaldi / Winwood	3:34
7.	"Here We Go 'Round the Mulberry Bush"	Capaldi / Mason / Winwood / Wood	2:39
8.	"Dear Mr. Fantasy"	Capaldi / Winwood / Wood	5:40
9.	"You Can All Join In"	Mason	3:36
10.	"Feelin' Alright?"	Mason	2:18
11.	"Pearly Queen"	Capaldi / Winwood	4:18
12.	"(Roamin' Thru the Gloamin' With) 40,000 Headmen"	Capaldi / Winwood	3:15
13.	"Vagabond Virgin"	Capaldi / Mason	5:17
14.	"Shanghai Noodle Factory"	Capaldi / Winwood / Larry Fallon / Jimmy Miller	3:30
15.	"Withering Tree"	Capaldi / Winwood	3:04
16.	"Medicated Goo"	Winwood / Miller	3:34

Disc two
No.	Title	Writer(s)	Length
1.	"Glad"	Winwood	6:59
2.	"Freedom Rider"	Capaldi / Winwood	2:44
3.	"Empty Pages"	Capaldi / Winwood	4:36
4.	"John Barleycorn"	Traditional / Winwood	6:21
5.	"The Low Spark of High Heeled Boys"	Capaldi / Winwood	11:36
6.	"Light Up or Leave Me Alone"	Capaldi	4:46
7.	"Rock and Roll Stew"	Jim Gordon / Rick Grech	4:21
8.	"Shoot out at the Fantasy Factory"	Capaldi / Winwood	6:02
9.	"Walking in the Wind"	Capaldi / Winwood	6:52
10.	"When the Eagle Flies"	Capaldi / Winwood	4:23
Total length:			2:02:15
