= Gold (Traffic album) =

Compilation album by Traffic
- Released: 26 July 2005
- Recorded: 1967–1974
- Genre: Rock, psychedelic rock, progressive rock, jazz fusion
- Length: 2:38:19
- Label: Island, Universal

Traffic chronology
20th Century Masters: The Millennium Collection – The Best of Traffic (2003)	Gold (2005)	Last Great Traffic Jam (2005)

Gold is a two-disc 2005 compilation album by the psychedelic rock band Traffic. It contains at least one song from each album except On the Road, Far from Home, and The Last Great Traffic Jam.

== Reception ==
Professional ratings
Review scores
Source	Rating
Allmusic	4.5/5 stars
Sputnikmusic	4.8/5

Allmusic gave the compilation a positive review, commenting, "While previous Island collections like Feelin' Alright: The Very Best of Traffic and 20th Century Masters – The Millennium Collection dutifully cover the radio essentials, Gold provides both newbies and longtime fans with a fully stocked buffet of fan favorites and album highlights."

== Track listing ==
=== Disc one ===
1. "Paper Sun" (Capaldi/Winwood) – 4.12
2. "Dealer" (Capaldi/Winwood) – 3.10
3. "Coloured Rain" (Capaldi/Winwood/Wood) – 2.39
4. "Hole in My Shoe" (Mason) – 3.00
5. "No Face, No Name, No Number" (Capaldi/Winwood) – 3.31
6. "Heaven Is in Your Mind" (Capaldi/Winwood/Wood) – 4.15
7. "Smiling Phases" (Capaldi/Winwood/Wood) – 2.39
8. "Dear Mr. Fantasy" (Capaldi/Winwood/Wood) – 5.34
9. "You Can All Join In" (Mason) – 3.35
10. "Pearly Queen" (Capaldi/Winwood) – 4.18
11. "Feelin' Alright" (Mason) – 4.16
12. "Who Knows What Tomorrow May Bring" (Capaldi/Winwood/Wood) – 3.12
13. "Forty Thousand Headmen" (Capaldi/Winwood) – 3.14
14. "Shanghai Noodle Factory" (Capaldi/Fallon/Winwood/Wood) – 5.04
15. "Medicated Goo" (Miller/Winwood) – 3.34
16. "Glad" (Winwood) – 6.57
17. "Freedom Rider" (Capaldi/Winwood) – 5.24
18. "Empty Pages" (Capaldi/Winwood) – 4.33
19. "John Barleycorn" (Traditional, arr. Winwood) – 6.21

=== Disc two ===
1. "Gimme Some Lovin'" [Live] (Winwood/Winwood/Davis) – 9.00
2. "The Low Spark of High-Heeled Boys" (Capaldi/Winwood) – 11.40
3. "Light Up Or Leave Me Alone" (Capaldi) – 4.46
4. "Rock and Roll Stew" (Gordon/Grech) – 6.08
5. "Rainmaker" (Capaldi/Winwood) – 7.49
6. "Shoot Out At The Fantasy Factory" (Capaldi/Winwood) – 6.01
7. "(Sometimes I Feel So) Uninspired" (Capaldi/Winwood) – 7.32
8. "Something New" (Capaldi/Winwood) – 3.15
9. "Dream Gerrard" (Stanshall/Winwood) – 11.02
10. "Walking In The Wind" (Capaldi/Winwood) – 6.51
11. "When The Eagle Flies" (Capaldi/Winwood) – 4.21
