= Best of Traffic =

Compilation album by Traffic
- Released: October 19, 1969
- Recorded: 1967–1968
- Genre: Psychedelic rock
- Length: 40:31
- Label: Island
- Producer: Jimmy Miller

Alternate U.S. Album Cover

Professional ratings
Review scores
Source	Rating
Allmusic	4/5 stars

Best of Traffic is a compilation album by the band Traffic. It was released shortly after one of the band's many break ups in 1969. The U.S. LP version of the compilation had a different cover design and replaced "Smiling Phases" with a shortened version of "You Can All Join In" (faded at 3:12).

== Track listing ==
Side one
No.	Title	Writer(s)	Length
1.	"Paper Sun"	Jim Capaldi / Steve Winwood	4:17
2.	"Heaven Is in Your Mind"	Capaldi / Winwood / Chris Wood	4:16
3.	"No Face, No Name, No Number"	Capaldi / Winwood	3:29
4.	"Coloured Rain"	Capaldi / Winwood / Wood	2:42
5.	"Smiling Phases"	Capaldi / Winwood / Wood	2:45
6.	"Hole in My Shoe"	Dave Mason	2:52

Side two
No.	Title	Writer(s)	Length
7.	"Medicated Goo"	Winwood, Jimmy Miller	3:10
8.	"40,000 Headmen"	Capaldi / Winwood	3:14
9.	"Feelin' Alright"	Mason	3:02
10.	"Shanghai Noodle Factory"	Winwood / Capaldi / Wood / Mason / Miller / Larry Fallon	5:04
11.	"Dear Mr. Fantasy"	Capaldi / Winwood / Wood	5:45
Total length:			40:31

== Personnel ==
- Jim Capaldi – drums, percussion, backing vocals, co-lead vocal on "Heaven Is in Your Mind"
- Dave Mason – bass, guitar, sitar, mellotron, backing vocals, lead vocals on "Hole in My Shoe" and "Feelin' Alright" (and "You Can All Join In" on U.S. version)
- Steve Winwood – lead vocals (except on "Hole in My Shoe" and "Feelin' Alright", and "You Can All Join In" on U.S. version), organ, piano, bass, guitar, percussion, harpsichord, backing vocals
- Chris Wood – flute, saxophone, organ, percussion, backing vocals

== Charts ==
Chart (1968–1969)	Peak position
Australian Albums (Kent Music Report)	12
US Billboard 200	48
