= Locomotive (band) =

British band (1965–1970)

(The) Locomotive
- Origin: Birmingham, England
- Genres: Jazz rock; progressive rock
- Years active: 1965–1970
- Labels: Direction; Parlophone
- Past members: Jim Simpson; Danny King; Chris Wood; Brian "Monk" Finch; Richard Storey; Pete Allen; Mike Kellie; Norman Haines; Jo Ellis; Bill Madge "Mooney" Mezzone; Mick Hincks; Bob Lamb; Mick Taylor; John Caswell; Keith Millar

Locomotive (originally The Locomotive) were a British band founded in Birmingham in 1965. Their jazz rock style drew elements from jazz, psychedelic rock and ska, and their original line-up featured Chris Wood, later of Traffic, and drummer Mike Kellie of Spooky Tooth. They had a minor UK hit in 1968 with "Rudi's in Love", before turning to progressive rock with their only album, We Are Everything You See, released in 1970.

== History ==
The group was formed in 1965, originally as the Kansas City Seven, by trumpeter Jim Simpson, with singer Danny King, saxophonists Chris Wood and Brian "Monk" Finch, organist Richard Storey, bass player Pete Allen, and drummer Mike Kellie. All the members had previously played in local bands in Birmingham. After they began playing less jazz and more R&B and soul music, they changed their name to The Locomotive, and gained a strong reputation for their live performances. There were many personnel changes, and by the end of 1966, after Wood left to join Steve Winwood, Jim Capaldi and Dave Mason in Traffic, Simpson was the only remaining original member. Other members by that time were singer and keyboard player Norman Haines, together with Jo Ellis (bass), Bill Madge (saxophone), and drummer "Mooney" Mezzone, later to become a singer and songwriter.

Having worked in a record shop in Smethwick, an area of Birmingham with a large Black British population of West Indian descent, Haines developed a particular interest in ska music. Increasingly, he took over as front man, and the band's first single, on the Direction label, combined Haines' composition, "Broken Heart", with a version of Dandy Livingstone's "A Message to You, Rudy", which was later revived by the Specials. In 1968, Simpson left the band in order to act as their manager, setting up still-extant label Big Bear Records; he later became the manager of local band Black Sabbath. In other personnel changes, Ellis and Mezzone were replaced by Mick Hincks (bass) and Bob Lamb (drums), with trumpeter Mick Taylor replacing Simpson. The band dropped the definite article from their name, moved to Parlophone Records, and their second single, "Rudi's in Love", was a ska song written by Haines. It became a hit, reaching No. 25 on the UK Singles Chart in late 1968.

Following the single's success, Locomotive recorded an album at the Abbey Road Studios in London with producer Gus Dudgeon. By this time, however, the band decided to perform more progressive rock, based around Haines' keyboard skills. Because of their uncertainty over how it would be received, the record company delayed the release of the album. A single, a version of a Question Mark and the Mysterians song, "I'm Never Gonna Let You Go", was released but failed to make the chart. Haines left the group in 1969, reportedly turning down an offer to join Black Sabbath and eventually forming the Norman Haines Band. Haines died in 2021, aged 75.

On its eventual release in early 1970, the Locomotive album, We Are Everything You See, received good reviews, but failed to appeal to the band's earlier R&B audience. The album included the track "Mr. Armageddon", released as a single and later included on several anthologies of progressive rock of the time, together with two tracks, "Coming Down" and "Love Song For the Dead Ché", which were versions of Joseph Byrd's songs for his band the United States of America. The band also recorded a single for the Transatlantic label, under the name of Steam Shovel.

Hincks and Lamb attempted to continue Locomotive with new members John Caswell and Keith Millar, releasing a single "Roll Over Mary", before changing the group's name to The Dog That Bit People in 1970. The renamed band released an album in 1971 before splitting up. Hincks and Lamb joined another local band, Tea and Symphony, before Lamb joined the Steve Gibbons Band and later worked as a record producer for UB40.

We Are Everything You See was reissued on CD in 1995 and again in 2010.

Lamb died on 16 October 2025, at the age of 78.

== Discography ==
=== Albums ===
- We Are Everything You See (Parlophone, 1970)

=== Singles ===
- "Broken Heart" / "Rudy - a Message to You" (Direction, 1967)
- "Rudi's in Love" / "Never Set Me Free" (Parlophone, 1968) - UK No. 25
- "I'm Never Gonna Let You Go" / "You Must Be Joking" (Parlophone, 1969)
- "Mr. Armageddan" / "There's Got to Be a Way" (Parlophone, 1969)
- "Roll Over Mary" / "Movin' Down the Line" (Parlophone, 1970)
