= Last Exit (Traffic album) =

1969 studio album by Traffic

Studio album / live album by Traffic
- Released: May 1969
- Recorded: Live tracks: 14 March 1968; Studios tracks: 1968–1969
- Venues: The (original) Fillmore, San Francisco, CA
- Studios: Morgan, London
- Length: 34:04
- Labels: Island (UK); United Artists (US); Polydor (Canada)
- Producer: Jimmy Miller

Traffic chronology
Traffic (1968)	Last Exit (1969)	John Barleycorn Must Die (1970)

Singles from Last Exit
- 1. "Medicated Goo" Released: December, 1968 (UK) February, 1969 (US)

US Cover

Last Exit is the third album release by English rock band Traffic. Released in May 1969, it is a collection of odds and ends packaged by Island Records after the initial breakup of the band. The first half of the album consists predominantly of previously released A-sides and B-sides, while the second half were recordings taken from a March 1968 concert at the Fillmore Auditorium. The album reached number 19 in the American Billboard Top LPs chart.

== Cover ==
As implied by the cover photos, the album features the original lineup of Steve Winwood, Jim Capaldi, Chris Wood, and Dave Mason. Mason only appears on two tracks: "Just for You" and "Something's Got a Hold of My Toe". The original American LP released by United Artists Records has different cover artwork. The US front features a different picture of the band cut up into the shape of the band's logo with a black background.

== Songs ==
Some of the studio recordings of this album were originally released on mono singles. The versions that appear on the album are in stereo.

"Just for You" was previously released in February 1968 as the A-side of a UK Dave Mason solo single. Conveniently for its use on this album, the other members of Traffic backed up Mason on this track. (The B-side was "Little Woman" on which Mason was backed by the band Family.) This single was released after Mason left Traffic the first time, following Mr. Fantasy.

"Medicated Goo" and "Shanghai Noodle Factory" were the A and B-sides of a UK Traffic single released in December 1968. The mono single version of "Medicated Goo" is a shorter edit with false ending that is not heard on the stereo album. The song would become a staple of the re-formed band's live performances in 1970–71.

"Something's Got a Hold of My Toe" is an instrumental and appears to be an outtake not originally intended for release. It is unclear why producer Jimmy Miller (a lyricist elsewhere on the album) gets a co-writing credit on this.

"Withering Tree" was previously released as the B-side to "Feelin' Alright" (September 1968), although the version on the LP is slightly different from the single. It was likely recorded while Dave Mason was still in the band, despite his absence from the recording.

"Feelin' Good" and "Blind Man", the two live recordings that make up the second half of the album, were recorded at the Fillmore Auditorium San Francisco on 14 March 1968. They were not written by the band members.

== Reception ==
Professional ratings
Review scores
Source	Rating
AllMusic	3/5 stars

AllMusic's retrospective review said that Last Exit, though weaker than its two predecessors, "isn't bad as profit-taking products go." They complimented most of the studio tracks as highly appealing works, and praised the cohesive jamming on the live tracks. However, when the Traffic catalogue was remastered for compact disc by Island Records at the turn of the century, Last Exit was not included, although three of its tracks were appended to the reissue of the second album.

== Track listing ==
Side one
No.	Title	Writer(s)	Length
1.	"Just for You"	Dave Mason	2:18
2.	"Shanghai Noodle Factory"	Steve Winwood, Jim Capaldi, Chris Wood, Jimmy Miller, Larry Fallon	5:06
3.	"Something's Got a Hold of My Toe"	Winwood, Mason, Miller	2:14
4.	"Withering Tree"	Winwood, Capaldi	3:04
5.	"Medicated Goo"	Winwood, Miller	3:36
Total length:			16:18

Side two
No.	Title	Writer(s)	Length
6.	"Feelin' Good" (live at the Fillmore)	Anthony Newley, Leslie Bricusse	10:40
7.	"Blind Man" (live at the Fillmore)	Deadric Malone, Joseph Scott	7:06
Total length:			17:46 (34:04)

== Personnel ==
Traffic

- Steve Winwood – organ, lead vocals (all but 1, 3), piano, bass, guitar (2, 5)
- Dave Mason – guitar (1, 3), lead vocals (1)
- Chris Wood – flute, saxophone, organ
- Jim Capaldi – drums, percussion, backing vocals

Technical

- Guy Stevens, Mike Sida – art direction
- Francine Winham, Raymond Ross, Richard Polak – photography

== Charts ==
Chart (1969)	Peak position
Canada Top Albums/CDs (RPM)	31
US Billboard 200	19

== Release history ==
Year	Type	Label	Catalog #
1969	LP	Island (UK)	ILPS 9097
1969	LP	United Artists (US)	UAS-6702
1988	CD	Island	7 90925-2
1990	LP	Island	422-842 787-1
1990	CS	Island	422-842 787-4
1990	CD	Island	422-842 787-2
2001	CD	Island	548540
