= Here We Go Round the Mulberry Bush (Traffic song) =

Single by Traffic
- B-side: "Coloured Rain" (Capaldi, Winwood, Wood)
- Released: 24 November 1967
- Genre: Psychedelic rock
- Length: 2:18
- Label: Island, United Artists
- Songwriters: Jim Capaldi, Dave Mason, Steve Winwood, Chris Wood
- Producer: Jimmy Miller

Traffic singles chronology
"Hole in My Shoe" (1967)	"Here We Go Round the Mulberry Bush" (1967)	"No Face, No Name, No Number" (1968)

"Here We Go Round the Mulberry Bush" is a single by Traffic. It is the title song to the film of the same name and also featured on the 2000 US re-issue of their debut album Mr. Fantasy, and features all four members of Traffic singing a joint lead, though the bridge and parts of the chorus have Steve Winwood singing unaccompanied. The single uses an edited version of the song, with the intro removed. When released in late 1967, the single cracked the UK Top 10. Footage of the band acting out the song was commissioned by The Beatles for possible inclusion in the film Magical Mystery Tour but was not used in the final edit. It is now included in the special features of the 2012 DVD/Blu-ray edition of the film.
