= The Last Great Traffic Jam =

- DVD cover

Live album by Traffic
- Released: 8 November 2005
- Genre: Rock
- Label: Wincraft/Epic

Traffic chronology
Far from Home (1994)	The Last Great Traffic Jam (2005)

The Last Great Traffic Jam is a live album and DVD from the English rock band Traffic. The album was recorded on the 1994 reunion tour supporting Far from Home.

== DVD track listing ==
1. "Pearly Queen" (Steve Winwood, Jim Capaldi) – 5:35
2. "Medicated Goo" (Winwood, Jimmy Miller) - 5:38
3. "Mozambique" (Winwood, Capaldi (Note: The album miscredits the song as composed solely by Capaldi. Both BMI's records and the sleeve notes of Far from Home (where the song was first released) confirm that it was composed jointly by Winwood and Capaldi.)) - 5:30
4. "40,000 Headmen" (Winwood, Capaldi) - 5:14
5. "Glad" (Winwood) - 6:55
6. "Walking in the Wind" (Winwood, Capaldi) - 7:12
7. "The Low Spark of High Heeled Boys" (Winwood, Capaldi) - 14:36
8. "Light Up Or Leave Me Alone" (Capaldi) - 16:26
9. "Dear Mr. Fantasy" (Winwood, Capaldi, Chris Wood) - 7:44
10. "John Barleycorn (Must Die)" (Traditional) - 6:57
11. "Gimme Some Lovin'" (Winwood, Mervyn "Muff" Winwood, Spencer Davis) - 7:25

=== Bonus disc ===
(audio only)

1. "40,000 Headmen"
2. "John Barleycorn (Must Die)"
3. "Low Spark of High Heeled Boys"

== Personnel ==
Traffic

- Steve Winwood – keyboards, guitars, lead vocals (1, 2, 4–7, 9–11)
- Jim Capaldi – drums, percussion, backing vocals, lead vocals (8, 10)

With:

- Randall Bramblett – keyboards, flute, saxophones
- Michael J McEvoy – keyboards, guitars, harmonica, viola
- Jerry Garcia – guitar on "Dear Mr. Fantasy"
- Rosko Gee – bass guitar
- Walfredo Reyes Jr. – percussion, drums
