= The Elbow Room =

Nightclub in Aston, Birmingham, England

The Elbow Room is a traditional nightclub in the Aston area of Birmingham, England. It played a significant part in the formation of the rock band, Traffic, in the late 1960s.

== History ==
On 11 September 1968, police arrested gangster Christopher Lambrianou, a key associate of British criminals the Kray twins, after he was tracked down to The Elbow Room.

During 1968, music performers at The Elbow Room included Sam Gopal Dream, Fairport Convention, Blossom Toes, Blonde On Blonde, The Toast, and Jimmy Griff.

On 17 April 1989, rock musician Steve Winwood and fellow musicians Jim Capaldi and Ruby Turner played a secret Birmingham show at the nightclub to raise cash for the badly-burned victim of a house fire. The club manager at the time was Albert Chapman.

In September 2008, the club was refurbished and relaunched by Colin Rogan, who had worked there for more than 27 years before taking over. Rogan was the new owner and Stella Hinsley the new licensee. One of the venue's first launch events was an under-18s disco held on 11 September 2008. During this time, the venue was described by its owners as "Birmingham's longest running club".

The venue closed in May 2012 after shots had been fired outside the venue just before 6am on April 28. CCTV footage also revealed a customer in possession of a handgun inside the club within sight of security staff. Club owner Rogan said he had been forced to shut due to a license "wrangle" following the incident and two attempts to obtain a new license within the three months following the incident were blocked by Birmingham City Council. West Midlands Police noted “There was a lack of control inside the premises” and said that the club had run ‘high risk events’, attracting gangs. It was reported the nightclub would remain "closed for good".

In July 2014, Tony Sofiano, a former owner of The Elbow Room, died of leukaemia, aged 71.

== Location ==
The Elbow Room is located at the junction of Potters Lane and High Street in Aston. The nightclub is next to the Legacy Centre of Excellence (formerly the Drum Arts Centre and Aston Hippodrome. The site of The Elbow Room was formerly the Burlington restaurant, near the corner of Burlington Street.

The Elbow Room's address is 146 High St, Aston, Birmingham B6 4US.

== Notable patrons ==
Musician Ozzy Osbourne, who grew up in Aston, and his Black Sabbath band members reportedly frequented the nightclub with footballer George Best.

Charlie Kray, older brother of the Kray twins, was photographed at the nightclub in 1995.
