= Whale Meat Again =

Studio album by Jim Capaldi
- Released: June 1974 (UK) / August 1974 (US/Canada)
- Recorded: 1974
- Genre: Rock
- Length: 41:02
- Label: Island - ILPS 9254
- Producer: Jim Capaldi

Jim Capaldi chronology
Oh How We Danced (1972)	Whale Meat Again (1974)	Short Cut Draw Blood (1975)

Singles from Whale Meat Again
- 1. "It's All Up To You" Released: July 1974

Whale Meat Again is the second studio album by the British musician Jim Capaldi, released by Island Records in 1974. Like his first solo album, it failed commercially in his native United Kingdom but did better in the United States. With help from the opening track, "It's All Right", which spent seven weeks in the Billboard Hot 100 and peaked at number 55, the album reached number 191 in the Billboard 200.

== Reception ==
Professional ratings
Review scores
Source	Rating
AllMusic	3/5 stars
Classic Rock	7/10 stars

AllMusic's retrospective review commented that the album was more focused on mood than Capaldi's debut, with longer songs built on soulful grooves "giving this album a funkier, open feel that lingers longer than the songs." In a review for the 2012 reissue of the album, Terry Stauntman of the British magazine Classic Rock remarked how this album "represents a further moving away from Traffic's sound and Capaldi marking out his own territory more forcefully".

== Track listing ==
All tracks composed by Jim Capaldi except where indicated.

Side one

1. "It's All Right" – 4:12
2. "Whale Meat Again" – 4:33
3. "Yellow Sun" – 7:16
4. "I've Got So Much Lovin'" – 4:45

Side two

1. "Low Rider" – 5:40
2. "My Brother" – 5:02
3. "Summer Is Fading" – 8:30 [concept credited to Vivian Stanshall]
4. "We'll Meet Again" (Hughie Charles, Ross Parker) – 1:25 [Unlisted track]

Two additional tracks were recorded in the same sessions. The first, an acoustic version of "Whale Meat Again", was released only on the B-side of the single "It's All Up to You" (from the album Short Cut Draw Blood). The second, "You & Me", was eventually released on the compilation album Koss. Capaldi also re-recorded "You & Me" with partially different lyrics and a new title, "The Contender", for his album of the same name.

== Personnel ==
=== Musicians ===
- Jim Capaldi – lead vocals

Muscle Shoals Rhythm Section

(all tracks except on "Summer Is Fading")

- Pete Carr – lead guitars
- Jimmy Johnson – guitar
- Barry Beckett – piano (except on "Whale Meat Again"), steel drum on "It's All Right"
- David Hood – bass (except on "Yellow Sun")
- Roger Hawkins – drums
- Muscle Shoals Horns – horns (tracks 1–2, 4, 6)

Additional musicians

- Rabbit Bundrick – piano and organ on "Whale Meat Again"
- Chris Stainton – organ on "Yellow Sun"
- Jean Roussel – bass on "Yellow Sun", clavinet on "Low Rider"
- Chris Stewart – fuzz bass on "My Brother"
- Remi Kabaka – percussion on "Low Rider"
- Steve Winwood – organ on "It's All Right" and "Summer Is Fading", bass on "Summer Is Fading"
- Anthony "Bubs" White – guitars on "Summer Is Fading"
- Gaspar Lawal – drums on "Summer Is Fading"
- Derek Quinn – cabassa on "Summer Is Fading"
- Rebop Kwaku Baah – conga on "Summer Is Fading"
- Potato Smith – backing vocals on "It's All Right" and "Yellow Sun"
- Laurence Peabody – backing vocals on "It's All Right" and "Yellow Sun"
- Harry Robinson – string arrangements on "Yellow Sun" and "Low Rider"

=== Technical ===
- Jim Capaldi – producer
- Howard Kilgour, Phil Brown, Steve Melton – engineers
- Rhett Davies, Richard Elen – tape ops
- Tony Wright – artwork, design
- Richard Polack – front cover photography
- Don Neff, Natalie Neff – back cover photography
