= The Low Spark of High Heeled Boys =

Studio album by Traffic
- Released: 26 November 1971
- Recorded: September 1971
- Studios: Island, London
- Genre: Progressive rock
- Length: 40:14 (original), 46:21 (reissue w/ bonus track)
- Labels: Island (worldwide except as noted); Polydor (Canada)
- Producer: Steve Winwood

Traffic chronology
Welcome to the Canteen (1971)	The Low Spark of High Heeled Boys (1971)	Shoot Out at the Fantasy Factory (1973)

Singles from The Low Spark of High Heeled Boys
- 1. "Rock & Roll Stew" Released: December 1971 (US only)

The Low Spark of High Heeled Boys is the fifth studio album by English rock band Traffic, released in 1971. The album was Traffic's most successful in the United States, reaching number 7 on the Billboard Top LPs chart and becoming their only platinum-certified album there, indicating sales in excess of one million. However, it failed to chart in the United Kingdom. The album features the minor hit "Rock & Roll Stew" and the title track, which received heavy FM airplay.

== Background ==
It was Traffic's first studio album to feature percussionist Rebop Kwaku Baah, and the only studio appearance of drummer Jim Gordon and bassist Ric Grech. Grech had previously worked with Traffic singer/multi-instrumentalist Steve Winwood in the short-lived supergroup Blind Faith. This is the only Traffic album to feature two lead vocals by Jim Capaldi ("Light Up or Leave Me Alone" and "Rock & Roll Stew"). His only other solo lead vocal on a Traffic studio album was on "Dealer" from Mr. Fantasy (1967).

As with other Traffic albums, The Low Spark of High Heeled Boys featured varied influences, including jazz, folk music and Classical. The name of the album's title track was suggested by the actor Michael J. Pollard.

The LP's front cover is notable for its top right and bottom left corners being clipped, giving the illusion of a three-dimensional cube. This effect would be repeated on their next album, Shoot Out at the Fantasy Factory. On original pressings of the UK and some European versions, the title of both the album and song are shown as 'The Low Spark of High-Heeled Boys' (with a hyphen) on the record labels.

The title of the album and the eponymous song on it became the source of some controversy in the UK upon initial release. At that time, the phrase "high-heeled boys" was often used by British writers as a slang term referring to organized-crime assassins. When it became clear the song was not inspired by this and was using the term in a non-descriptive sense, the issue faded away.

== Reception ==
Professional ratings
Review scores
Source	Rating
AllMusic	4.5/5 stars
Christgau's Record Guide	B
The Encyclopedia of Popular Music	4/5 stars

Critical retrospectives on the album are generally positive. AllMusic was overwhelmingly approving in its assessment, praising the variety brought by the non-Winwood/Capaldi compositions and the power of the lengthy title track, and claiming the album "marked the commercial and artistic apex of the second coming of Traffic". In addition, Robert Christgau commented on the band's growth from previous efforts, stating that while the group is "devoid of intellectual thrust", they're "onto something", and "when it works, it suggests a nice paradox—relaxed and exciting at the same time." Pop Matters offered yet another viewpoint, calling it "an album that's easy to listen to over and over, but one that seldom shows up on 'best of' lists." It commented that most of the songs are highly underrated and require multiple listens to appreciate. It was voted number 625 in Colin Larkin's All Time Top 1000 Albums 3rd Edition (2000).

The album was certified gold less than a year after its release in the United States, and eventually certified platinum in 1996. It was remastered and reissued with one bonus track on 19 March 2002.

== Track listing ==
The first six songs as listed here are the track order as originally released on LP in the US and many parts of the world. Both LP and CD pressings exist with "Light Up Or Leave Me Alone" as the fifth track of the album instead of the third.

Side one
No.	Title	Writer(s)	Length
1.	"Hidden Treasure"	Steve Winwood, Jim Capaldi	4:11
2.	"The Low Spark of High Heeled Boys"	Winwood, Capaldi	11:44
3.	"Light Up or Leave Me Alone"	Capaldi	4:48
Total length:			20:43

Side two
No.	Title	Writer(s)	Length
4.	"Rock & Roll Stew"	Ric Grech, Jim Gordon	4:23
5.	"Many a Mile to Freedom"	Winwood, Anna Capaldi	7:16
6.	"Rainmaker"	Winwood, Capaldi	7:52
Total length:			19:31 (40:14)

2002 bonus track
No.	Title	Writer(s)	Length
7.	"Rock & Roll Stew Parts 1 & 2"	Grech, Gordon	6:07
Total length:			(46:21)

Note: This consists of "Part 1" and "Part 2" from the single, joined into one track. Part 1 is an edit of the album version, with about 45 seconds cut from the instrumental break. Part 2 is an extended jam that begins, with a fade-in, at a point shortly before the end of the album version's fadeout. Thus, in comparison to the album version, this is both an edited and extended version. This is also the version of "Rock & Roll Stew" that appears on the Gold compilation.

== Personnel ==
=== Traffic ===
- Steve Winwood – lead vocals (1, 2, 5, 6), backing vocals, acoustic piano, Hammond organ, guitars
- Chris Wood – saxophones, flute
- Ric Grech – bass, violin
- Jim Gordon – drums (1–5)
- Jim Capaldi – percussion, lead vocals (3, 4), backing vocals (6)
- Rebop Kwaku Baah – percussion

with:

- Mike Kellie – drums (6) [uncredited]

== Production ==
- Steve Winwood – producer
- Brian Humphries – engineer
- Tony Wright – cover art
- Richard Polak – photography

== Charts ==
Chart (1971–1972)	Peak position
Australian Albums (Kent Music Report)	38
Canada Top Albums/CDs (RPM)	18
German Albums (Offizielle Top 100)	48
US Billboard 200	7

== Certifications ==
Region	Certification	Certified units/sales
United Kingdom (BPI)	Gold	100,000^{^}
United States (RIAA)	Platinum	1,000,000^{^}
^{^} Shipments figures based on certification alone.
