= Oh How We Danced =

Studio album by Jim Capaldi
- Released: February 1972
- Recorded: December 1971
- Studio: Muscle Shoals Sound Studios, Sheffield, AL; Island Studios, London
- Genre: Rock
- Length: 37:25
- Label: Island
- Producer: Jim Capaldi, Chris Blackwell

Jim Capaldi chronology
Oh How We Danced (1972)	Whale Meat Again (1974)

Singles from Oh How We Danced
- 1. "Eve" Released: February 1972; 2. "Oh How We Danced" Released: June 1972

CD reissue cover

Oh How We Danced is the debut solo studio album by the British musician Jim Capaldi. The album was recorded while Traffic was on hiatus due to Steve Winwood's struggles with peritonitis and was released by Island Records in 1972. Like his contemporary albums with Traffic, it was unsuccessful in his native United Kingdom but did better in the United States, reaching number 82 in the Billboard 200 chart and producing the hit single "Eve", which reached number 91 in the Billboard Hot 100. "Eve" failed in the UK on its initial release as a single in 1972, but when reactivated two years later reached the 'breakers' list just outside the Top 50.

The track "Open Your Heart" is a surplus recording from Traffic's then-most recent album, The Low Spark of High Heeled Boys. All of the remaining tracks, save "How Much Can a Man Really Take?", were recorded at Muscle Shoals Sound Studios with the Muscle Shoals Rhythm Section.

== Reception ==
Professional ratings
Review scores
Source	Rating
AllMusic	4/5 stars
Classic Rock	7/10 stars

Critical reception for Oh How We Danced was resoundingly positive. Rolling Stone applauded Capaldi's clever yet earnest lyrics and the strong collection of guest musicians, concluding that the album has "not a whiff of mediocrity to be heard." Allmusic's retrospective review complimented the strong set of songs and "its mellow vibe, generated by the genial familiarity of the players". They also made note of "Capaldi's sweet, unassuming voice", an echo of Rolling Stone's reference to his "sweet smooth easy voice." In a review for the 2012 reissue of the album, Terry Stauntman of the British magazine Classic Rock described the album as very close to Traffic latest works, with the difference that "the more soulful side of the band is given a sharper focus".

== Track listing ==
All tracks composed by Jim Capaldi, except where indicated.

Side one

1. "Eve" – 3:39
2. "Big Thirst" (Jim Capaldi, Dave Mason) – 5:27
3. "Love Is All You Can Try" – 3:23
4. "Last Day of Dawn" – 4:24

Side two

1. "Don't Be a Hero" – 5:58
2. "Open Your Heart" – 4:04
3. "How Much Can a Man Really Take?" – 5:21
4. "Anniversary Song" (Saul Chaplin, Al Jolson) – 4:28 [Mislabeled on some releases as "Oh How We Danced"]

One further track, "Going Down Slow All the Way", was recorded at an unidentified studio in England and released as the b-side to the single "Eve". The track features only piano, tambourine, bass drum, and a single vocal, all presumably played by Jim Capaldi, who produced the track by himself. It was included as bonus of the 2012 CD release of the album.

== Personnel ==
- Jim Capaldi – lead vocals, piano (track 6), acoustic guitar (track 4)

Muscle Shoals Rhythm Section

(except tracks 6–7)

- David Hood – bass
- Roger Hawkins – drums
- Barry Beckett – piano, organ (tracks 1, 5)
- Jimmy Johnson – electric guitar

Additional musicians

- Paul Kossoff – electric guitar (tracks 2, 4–5, 7–8)
- Dave Mason – harmonica (track 2) electric guitar solo (track 5)
- Steve Winwood – organ (track 1, 6), backing vocal (track 6), guitar (track 3)
- Chris Wood – flute (track 7), electric saxophone (track 6)
- Ric Grech – bass (track 6)
- Jim Gordon – drums (track 6)
- Rebop Kwaku Baah – percussion (tracks 4, 6), congas (track 7)
- Trevor Burton – bass (track 7)
- Mike Kellie – drums (track 7)
- Bob Griffin – piano (track 7)
- Sunny Leslie – backing vocal (track 2)

Technical

- Chris Blackwell, Jim Capaldi – producers
- Brian Humphries, Jerry Masters – engineer
- Neal Preston – cover photography
