= On the Road (Traffic album) =

Live album by Traffic
- Released: October 1973
- Recorded: April 1973, Germany
- Genres: Progressive rock; jazz fusion; jam rock
- Length: 75:59
- Label: Island
- Producer: Chris Blackwell

Traffic chronology
Shoot Out at the Fantasy Factory (1973)	On the Road (1973)	When the Eagle Flies (1974)

On The Road is the second live album (two LPs on initial European releases; later reissued on one CD) by English rock band Traffic, released in 1973. Recorded live in Germany, it features the Shoot Out at the Fantasy Factory band, with the Muscle Shoals Rhythm Section of keyboardist Barry Beckett, bassist David Hood, and drummer Roger Hawkins.

The initial U.S. release of On the Road (Island/Capitol) was a single LP consisting of "The Low Spark of High Heeled Boys" (edited to 15:10), "Shoot Out at the Fantasy Factory", "(Sometimes I Feel So) Uninspired", and "Light Up or Leave Me Alone".

The album reached number 40 in the UK and number 29 in the USA.

== Reception ==
In their retrospective review, Allmusic praised the playing of Roger Hawkins, David Hood, and Barry Beckett, but condemned the album for both stretching the songs out for too long and failing to improve on the "lackluster" studio versions of the three songs from Shoot Out at the Fantasy Factory.

== Track listing ==
Side one
No.	Title	Writer(s)	Length
1.	"Glad" / "Freedom Rider"	Steve Winwood / Winwood, Jim Capaldi	20:49

Side two
No.	Title	Writer(s)	Length
1.	"Tragic Magic"	Chris Wood	8:30
2.	"(Sometimes I Feel So) Uninspired"	Winwood, Capaldi	10:20

Side three
No.	Title	Writer(s)	Length
1.	"Shoot Out at the Fantasy Factory"	Winwood, Capaldi	6:40
2.	"Light up or Leave Me Alone"	Capaldi	10:30

Side four
No.	Title	Writer(s)	Length
1.	"The Low Spark of High Heeled Boys"	Winwood, Capaldi	17:35

== U.S. & Canada LP track listing ==
Side one
No.	Title	Writer(s)	Length
1.	"The Low Spark of High Heeled Boys"	Steve Winwood, Jim Capaldi	15:10
2.	"Shoot Out At The Fantasy Factory"	Winwood, Capaldi	6:47

Side two
No.	Title	Writer(s)	Length
1.	"(Sometimes I Feel So) Uninspired"	Winwood, Capaldi	10:20
2.	"Light Up or Leave Me Alone"	Capaldi	10:45

== Personnel ==
- Steve Winwood – guitar, lead vocals (1, 3, 4, 6), piano
- Chris Wood – flute, saxophone, percussion (5)
- Jim Capaldi – percussion, lead vocals (5), drums (4)
- Rebop Kwaku Baah – congas, percussion
- Barry Beckett – organ, piano
- David Hood – bass
- Roger Hawkins – drums

Production notes:

- Chris Blackwell – producer
- Brian Humphries – engineer
- Jimmy Johnson – mixing
- Jeff Willens – mastering
- Ann Borthwick – cover art
- Brian Cooke – photography

== Charts ==
Chart (1973–1974)	Peak position
Australian Albums (Kent Music Report)	51
Canada Top Albums/CDs (RPM)	43
UK Albums (Official Charts)	29
US Billboard 200	29
