= Far from Home (album) =

Studio album by Traffic
- Released: 3 May 1994
- Recorded: 1974 & 1994 Woodstock, Kilcoole, near Dublin, Eire
- Genre: Progressive rock
- Length: 62:19
- Label: Virgin
- Producers: Steve Winwood, Jim Capaldi

Traffic chronology
When the Eagle Flies (1974)	Far from Home (1994)	The Last Great Traffic Jam (2005)

Singles from Far from Home
- 1. "Here Comes A Man" Released: 23 May 1994; 2. "Some Kinda Woman" Released: 12 September 1994

Professional ratings
Review scores
Source	Rating
AllMusic	3/5 stars
Music Week	3/5 stars
Rolling Stone	3/5 stars

Far from Home is the eighth and final studio album by the English rock band Traffic. The project began as a revival of the writing collaboration between Steve Winwood and Jim Capaldi, but soon blossomed into the first Traffic project since 1974. The album is dedicated to Chris Wood (Traffic’s founding woodwind player) who died in 1983.

== Recording ==
The album was recorded in Woodstock, Kilcoole near Dublin, Ireland and mixed at the Chateau Miraval in Correns, southern France. Though the subsequent tour would feature a full band, this album features Winwood playing all of the instruments and singing all the vocals, with the exception of Capaldi's drums and backing vocals, Davy Spillane's Uilleann pipes on "Holy Ground", and recording engineer Mick Dolan's rhythm guitar on "Nowhere Is Their Freedom" and programming on the Akai S1000.

The song "State of Grace" was intended to be a Jim Capaldi solo tune, but when the Traffic project took shape, Winwood and Capaldi decided to use it for Far from Home instead.

There was sampling of Wood’s actual flute/sax playing on parts of the album like “Here Comes a Man” and "Nowhere Is Their Freedom") as well as Winwood’s emulating his style on other instruments.

== Release ==
In the United States, Far From Home was released on 3 May 1994. Its lead single, "Here Comes a Man" was serviced to US [[Album-oriented rock rock]] and adult album alternative radio stations on 18 April 1994. Elsewhere, Far from Home was released on 9 May 1994. The album reached number 29 in the UK Albums Chart, where it remained for four weeks, making it Traffic's most commercially successful album in their home country since John Barleycorn Must Die. In Germany, it scored two minor hits ("Here Comes a Man" and "Some Kinda Woman") and reached number 22 in the album charts. It also managed to reach number 33 in the USBillboard chart.

== Critical reception ==
Reviewing the album for Rolling Stone, J. D. Considine felt that the arrangements and musicianship were the strongest aspects on Far from Home. He particularly highlighted the "cohesion to the instrumental work" on "Mozambique" and the choice of instrumentation on "Here Comes a Man", but believed that the lyrics on the album had "a vague, New Agey mysticism" to them. Billboard said that the album "ambles on automatic pilot, [with] its programmed tracks serving as a flimsy substitute for the band's legendary jams." Cashbox felt that the album more closely resembled a Winwood solo album than a cohesive release from Traffic, saying that the effort "sounds much more contrived and assembled, ultimately doing the band's name a disservice." Music Week called Far from Home "contemporary and respectful to their previous work."

== Artwork ==
The 3D-rendered cover design shows a stick-figure hovering above a checkerboard patterned floor playing a flute, a nod to the deceased Chris Wood’s woodwind postmortem role. The stick-figure's head is aligned in the middle of the Traffic logo, which is seen in a dark blue-gradient background. The back sleeve for the CD version of the album features a blurry photograph of Winwood and Capaldi on a beach. Several blurry photos of Winwood and Capaldi appear inside the inner sleeve of the booklet.

== Track listing ==
All songs written by Steve Winwood and Jim Capaldi unless otherwise indicated.

1. "Riding High" – 5:30
2. "Here Comes a Man" – 5:06
3. "Far from Home" – 8:33
4. "Nowhere is Their Freedom" – 6:57
5. "Holy Ground" (Winwood, Capaldi, Davy Spillane) – 7:48
6. "Some Kinda Woman" – 5:26
7. "Every Night, Every Day" – 5:30
8. "This Train Won't Stop" – 5:23
9. "State of Grace" – 7:16
10. "Mozambique" – 4:22

== Personnel ==
Traffic

- Jim Capaldi – drums, percussion, backing vocals (4, 6, 7), assistant production, art direction
- Steve Winwood – lead and backing vocals, pianos, synthesizers, organ, synthesizer programming, guitars, bass guitar, drum machine programming, flute, timbales (1), saxophone (6), congas (9), engineering, mixing, production

Additional musicians

- Mick Dolan – rhythm guitar (4), Akai S1000 programming
- Davy Spillane – Uilleann pipes (5)

Technical personnel

- Howard Beck – technician
- Karim Benzezour – mixing assistance
- Mick Dolan – engineer, mixing at Studio Miraval, Le Val, France
- Douglas Brothers – photography
- Steve Gardes – design
- Viv Phillips – project coordination
- Tim Young – mastering at Metropolis Mastering, London, United Kingdom

== Charts ==
Chart (1994)	Peak position
Dutch Albums (Album Top 100)	72
European Albums (Music & Media)	27
German Albums (Offizielle Top 100)	22
Scottish Albums (Official Charts)	68
Swedish Albums (Sverigetopplistan)	38
Swiss Albums (Schweizer Hitparade)	17
UK Albums (Official Charts)	29
US Billboard 200	33

== Release history ==
- 1994 – Virgin CD: 7243 8 39490 2 1 (CDV 2727)
- 1994 – Virgin MC: 7243 8 39490 4 5 (TCV 2727)
