= Hole in My Shoe =

1967 single by Traffic

Single by Traffic
- B-side: "Smiling Phases" (Capaldi, Winwood, Wood)
- Released: August 1967
- Genre: Psychedelic pop; psychedelic rock
- Length: 2:52
- Label: Island WIP 6017; United Artists UA 50218
- Songwriter: Dave Mason
- Producer: Jimmy Miller

Traffic singles chronology
"Paper Sun" (1967)	"Hole in My Shoe" (1967)	"Here We Go Round the Mulberry Bush" (1967)

Official audio
- "Hole in My Shoe" on YouTube

"Hole in My Shoe" is a song by English rock band Traffic, released as a single in 1967, which reached number 2 in the UK Singles Chart, number 22 in the German charts, number 2 in New Zealand, and number 4 in Canada. Composed by guitarist Dave Mason (the first song he ever wrote), it was disliked by the other three members of the group who felt that it did not represent the band's musical or lyrical style.

The song features a spoken-word midsection by Chris Blackwell's stepdaughter, Francine Heimann, in which she tells a little story about a giant albatross. In February 2026, the song was adapted into a children's book by Mason (accompanied by a re-recording featuring John McFee of American rock band The Doobie Brothers and his wife Winifred taking Heimann's place on the spoken-word parts), shortly before his death.

== Personnel ==
=== Musicians ===
- Jim Capaldi – drums, backing vocals
- Dave Mason – lead vocals, guitar, Mellotron, sitar
- Steve Winwood – Hammond organ, bass guitar, piano, backing vocals
- Chris Wood – flute, backing vocals
- Francine Heimann – spoken word (uncredited)

=== Technical ===
- Eddie Kramer – engineer
- Jimmy Miller – producer

== Cover version ==
In July 1984, Nigel Planer, who played Neil in the BBC sitcom The Young Ones, recorded a cover version of the song, which reached the same number 2 peak as the original. It also peaked at number 1 in Ireland and number 29 in Australia. His version featured Barbara Gaskin on backing vocals and was produced by Dave Stewart.
