= John Barleycorn Must Die =

Studio album by Traffic
- Released: July 1970
- Recorded: February–April 1970
- Studios: Island and Olympic, London
- Genres: Progressive rock; jazz-rock
- Length: 35:06
- Labels: Island (UK); United Artists (US); Polydor (Canada)
- Producers: Chris Blackwell, Steve Winwood, Guy Stevens

Traffic chronology
Last Exit (1969)	John Barleycorn Must Die (1970)	Welcome to the Canteen (1971)

Singles from John Barleycorn Must Die
- 1. "Empty Pages" Released: 1 July 1970 (US only)

John Barleycorn Must Die is the fourth studio album by English rock band Traffic, released in 1970. It marked the band's comeback after a brief disbandment, and peaked at number 5 on the Billboard Top LPs chart, making it their highest-charting album in the US, and has been certified a gold record by the RIAA. In addition, the single "Empty Pages" spent eight weeks on the Billboard Hot 100, peaking at number 74. The album was marginally less successful in the UK, reaching number 11 on the UK Albums Chart.

The album was released as Island ILPS 9116 in the United Kingdom, United Artists UAS 5504 in the United States, and as Polydor 2334 013 in Canada.

== Background and content ==
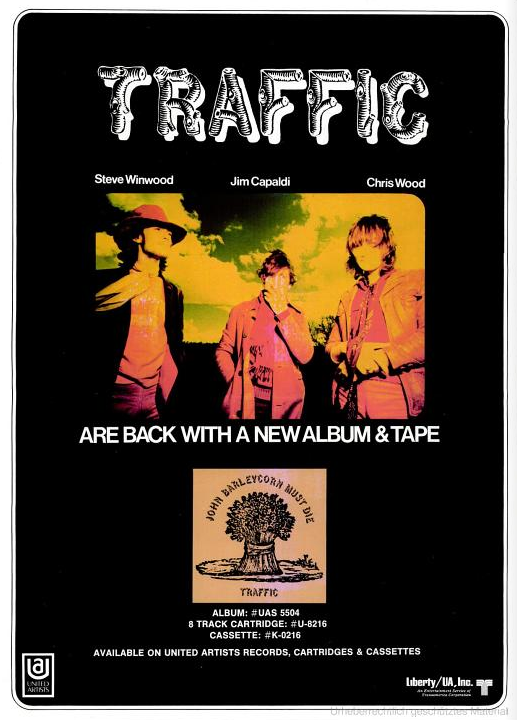
Trade ad for the album, 1970

In late 1968, Traffic disbanded, with guitarist Dave Mason leaving the group for the second time prior to the completion of the band's eponymous album Traffic. In 1969, Steve Winwood joined the supergroup Blind Faith, while drummer and lyricist Jim Capaldi and woodwinds player Chris Wood turned to session work. Wood and Winwood also joined Blind Faith's drummer Ginger Baker in his post-Blind Faith group Ginger Baker's Air Force for their debut album, Ginger Baker's Air Force (1970).

At the beginning of 1970, after the demise of Blind Faith, Winwood returned to the studio ostensibly to make his debut solo album, originally to be titled Mad Shadows. He recorded two tracks with producer Guy Stevens, "Stranger to Himself" and "Every Mother's Son", but yearned for like-minded musicians to accompany, inviting Wood and Capaldi to join him. Thus Winwood's erstwhile solo album became the reunion of Traffic (minus Dave Mason), and a re-launch of the band's career. Mad Shadows would go on to be the title of Mott the Hoople's second album, also produced by Guy Stevens, and the new Winwood/Traffic album took its title from one of its tracks and became John Barleycorn Must Die.

The album featured influences from jazz and blues, but the version of the traditional English folk tune that provided the album's title, "John Barleycorn", also showed the musicians attending to a modern interpretation of traditional folk music in the vein of contemporary British bands Pentangle and Fairport Convention. Whereas previous Traffic albums had been dominated by more concise song structures, John Barleycorn saw the group develop into a looser, jam-oriented progressive rock and jazz fusion style, setting the tone for their subsequent output in the 1970s.

The album was reissued for compact disc in the UK on 1 November 1999, with five bonus tracks, including three recorded in concert from the Fillmore East in New York City. In the US, the remastered reissue of 27 February 2001 included only the two studio bonus tracks.

The opening instrumental "Glad" was later sampled in the American singer Christina Aguilera's track "Makes Me Wanna Pray" (from her 2006 album Back to Basics), with Winwood credited as a featured artist.

Steve Winwood oversaw a deluxe edition that was released on 15 March 2011, featuring the original studio album, digitally remastered on disc one, plus a second disc of bonus material, including more of the Fillmore East concert, with alternate mixes and versions of album tracks.

== Cover ==
The original LP release of the album had the front cover design on a background consisting of a photograph of burlap. Later LP copies had the design on a grey background. The cover is displayed prominently during a party scene in the 1971 movie by Dario Argento, Four Flies on Grey Velvet.

== Reception ==
Professional ratings
Review scores
Source	Rating
AllMusic	4/5 stars
American Songwriter	5/5 stars
Christgau's Record Guide	C+
The Encyclopedia of Popular Music	5/5 stars
The Great Rock Discography	7/10
MusicHound Rock	4.5/5 stars
PopMatters	9/10
Record Collector	4/5 stars
The Rolling Stone Album Guide	4/5 stars
Uncut	4/5 stars

Retrospective reviews of the album have been mixed. AllMusic criticised the vocal sections as "excuses for Winwood to exercise his expressive voice as punctuation to the extended instrumental sections", but made note of how the album took the band's jazz/rock leanings beyond mere jamming. Village Voice critic Robert Christgau said the departure of Mason hurt Traffic's songwriting on the album, leaving the band to depend on Winwood's "feckless improvised rock, or is it folksong-based jazz?"

However, John Barleycorn Must Die was voted number 369 in Colin Larkin's All Time Top 1000 Albums 3rd Edition (2000). It was also included in The MOJO Collection: The Greatest Albums of All Time, which described it as "a magnificent album" that provided "a remarkable showcase" for Winwood's gifts. The album was also included in the book 1001 Albums You Must Hear Before You Die.

== Track listing ==
Side one
No.	Title	Writer(s)	Personnel	Length
1.	"Glad"	Steve Winwood	Personnel: Steve Winwood – organ, piano, bass guitar, percussion; Chris Wood – saxophone, electric saxophone, flute, percussion; Jim Capaldi – drums, percussion	6:32
2.	"Freedom Rider"	Winwood, Jim Capaldi	Personnel: Winwood – vocals, organ, piano, percussion; Wood – saxophone, electric saxophone, flute, percussion; Capaldi – drums, percussion	6:20
3.	"Empty Pages"	Winwood, Capaldi (Note: The 2011 reissue credits both the studio and live versions of this song to Winwood alone.)	Personnel: Winwood – vocals, organ, electric piano, bass guitar; Wood – organ; Capaldi – drums, percussion	4:47
Total length:				17:39

Side two
No.	Title	Writer(s)	Personnel	Length
4.	"Stranger to Himself"	Winwood, Capaldi	Personnel: Winwood – vocals, all instruments; Capaldi – vocals	4:02
5.	"John Barleycorn (Must Die)"	traditional; arranged by Winwood	Personnel: Winwood – vocals, acoustic guitar, piano; Wood – flute, percussion; Capaldi – vocals, tambourine	6:20
6.	"Every Mother's Son"	Winwood, Capaldi	Personnel: Winwood – vocals, all instruments other than drums; Capaldi – drums	7:05
Total length:				17:27 (35:06)

Previously unreleased studio bonus tracks 4. ("I Just Want You To Know") and 8. ("Sittin' Here Thinkin' of My Love") are solo demos by Winwood. The live tracks, recorded on 18/19 November at the Fillmore East, comprise what was to have been side one of Live Traffic (ILPS 9142), presumably shelved in favor of Welcome to the Canteen.

1999 reissue
No.	Title	Writer(s)	Personnel	Length
1.	"Glad"	Winwood		7:00
2.	"Freedom Rider"	Winwood, Capaldi		5:30
3.	"Empty Pages"	Winwood, Capaldi		4:35
4.	"I Just Want You to Know"	Winwood, Capaldi	Personnel: Winwood – vocals, all instruments	1:31
5.	"Stranger to Himself"	Winwood, Capaldi		3:57
6.	"John Barleycorn"	traditional; arranged by Winwood		6:27
7.	"Every Mother's Son"	Winwood, Capaldi		7:08
8.	"Sittin' Here Thinkin' of My Love"	Winwood, Capaldi	Personnel: Winwood – vocals, all instruments	3:33
9.	"Backstage and Introduction" (live; introduction by Bill Graham)	Winwood, Capaldi		1:50
10.	"Who Knows What Tomorrow May Bring" (live)	Capaldi, Winwood, Chris Wood	Personnel: Winwood – vocals, Hammond organ, bass pedals; Wood – saxophone; Ric Grech – guitar; Capaldi – drums	6:56
11.	"Glad" (live)	Winwood	Personnel: Winwood – Hammond organ; Wood – saxophone; Grech – bass guitar; Capaldi – drums	11:30
Total length:				59:57

Island Records 314 548 541-2, also includes the previously unreleased tracks "I Just Want You to Know" and "Sittin' Here Thinkin' of My Love".

2001 US remastered reissue
No.	Title	Length
1.	"Glad"	6:57
2.	"Freedom Rider"	5:24
3.	"Empty Pages"	4:33
4.	"I Just Want You to Know"	1:30
5.	"Stranger to Himself"	3:50
6.	"John Barleycorn"	6:21
7.	"Every Mother's Son"	7:05
8.	"Sittin' Here Thinkin' of My Love"	3:24
Total length:		39:04

2011 deluxe reissue disc two
No.	Title	Writer(s)	Length
1.	"Stranger to Himself" (alternative mix)	Winwood, Capaldi	4:08
2.	"John Barleycorn Must Die" (first version)	traditional; arranged by Winwood	5:05
3.	"Every Mother's Son" (alternative mix)	Winwood, Capaldi	7:03
4.	"Backstage and Introduction"		1:50
5.	"Medicated Goo" (live)	Winwood, Jimmy Miller	4:17
6.	"Empty Pages" (live)	Winwood, Capaldi	4:47
7.	"Forty Thousand Headmen" (live)	Winwood, Capaldi	4:28
8.	"Who Knows What Tomorrow May Bring?" (live)	Winwood, Capaldi, Wood	5:17
9.	"Every Mother's Son" (live)	Winwood, Capaldi	6:59
10.	"Glad" / "Freedom Rider" (live)	Winwood / Winwood, Capaldi	14:28
Total length:			58:22

Tracks 4–10 were recorded on 18–19 November 1970 at the Fillmore East and feature Ric Grech.

== Personnel ==
Traffic

- Steve Winwood – acoustic piano (1, 2, 5), organ (1, 2, 3), percussion (1, 2), vocals (2–6), electric piano (3), bass guitar (1, 3), all instruments (4), acoustic guitar (5), all other instruments (6)
- Jim Capaldi – drums (1, 2, 3, 5, 6), percussion (1, 2, 3), backing vocals (4, 5), tambourine (5)
- Chris Wood – percussion (1, 2, 5), saxophone (1, 2), electric saxophone (1, 2), flute (1, 2, 5), organ (3)

== Production ==
- Chris Blackwell – producer (1, 2, 3, 5)
- Steve Winwood – producer (1, 2, 3, 5)
- Guy Stevens – producer (4, 6)
- Brian Humphries – engineer
- Andy Johns – engineer
- Lee Hulko – mastering
- Mike Sida – album design
- Richard Polak – photography

== Charts ==
Chart (1970–1971)	Peak position
Australian Albums (Kent Music Report)	14
Canada Top Albums/CDs (RPM)	6
Dutch Albums (Album Top 100)	5
Norwegian Albums (VG-lista)	15
UK Albums (Official Charts)	11
US Billboard 200	5

== Certifications ==
Region	Certification	Certified units/sales
United States (RIAA)	Gold	500,000^{^}
^{^} Shipments figures based on certification alone.
