= When the Eagle Flies =

Studio album by Traffic
- Released: September 1974
- Recorded: July 1973 – June 1974
- Studios: Netherturkdonic Studios, Gloucestershire, England & Basing Street Studios, London
- Genre: Progressive rock
- Length: 39:45
- Labels: Island, Asylum (US)
- Producer: Chris Blackwell

Traffic chronology
On the Road (1973)	When the Eagle Flies (1974)	Far from Home (1994)

When the Eagle Flies is the seventh studio album by English rock band Traffic, released in 1974. The album featured Jim Capaldi, Steve Winwood and Chris Wood, with Rosko Gee on bass guitar. Percussionist Rebop Kwaku Baah was sacked prior to the album's completion, but two tracks feature his playing. Winwood plays a broader variety of keyboard instruments than most previous Traffic albums, adding Moog and Mellotron to their repertoire. This was the last Traffic album for 20 years, when Winwood and Capaldi reunited for Far from Home in 1994.

When the Eagle Flies was the band's fourth consecutive studio album to reach the American Top Ten and have gold album status. It was far less successful in the United Kingdom, where it entered the charts at number 31 only to drop off the following week. Traffic toured to support the release, but they disbanded in the middle of the tour in 1974.

The Chris Wood composition "Moonchild Vulcan" was recorded for the album, but ultimately left off in favour of "Memories of a Rock n' Rolla". The song was played on the supporting tour for the album, however, and a live recording by Traffic was later released on the posthumous Chris Wood CD Vulcan, released in 2008. (Note: The 2008 Vulcan CD also includes a post-Traffic studio recording of "Moonchild Vulcan" by Wood. Other recordings of the song, including the Traffic version, appear on the Chris Wood compilations Evening Blue (a box set) and Moon Child Vulcan (an abridged MP3 version of the box set).)

== Reception ==
Professional ratings
Review scores
Source	Rating
Allmusic	3/5 stars
Tom Hull	C−

Rolling Stone called the album uneven, saying that its bleak tone works superbly on "Graveyard People" and "Walking in the Wind", but elsewhere it often "turns anemic as a result of either a poorly conceived arrangement or inadequate production." However, they regarded the use of tighter and more concise songs as a promising change in direction for the band, and recommended the album based on the renewed strength of Winwood/Capaldi's songwriting and Winwood's work with the keyboards. Allmusic's retrospective review asserted the opposite: that the album indulged in long and meandering instrumentation more than any other work by Traffic, with even Winwood doing no more than "improvising his melodies over the music, paying little heed to the meaning of the words".

== Track listing ==
All tracks are written by Steve Winwood and Jim Capaldi, except where indicated.

Side one
No.	Title	Writer(s)	Length
1.	"Something New"		3:15
2.	"Dream Gerrard"	Winwood, Vivian Stanshall	11:03
3.	"Graveyard People"		6:05

Side two
No.	Title	Length
4.	"Walking in the Wind"	6:48
5.	"Memories of a Rock n' Rolla"	4:50
6.	"Love"	3:20
7.	"When the Eagle Flies"	4:24
Total length:		39:45

== Personnel ==
Traffic

- Steve Winwood – vocals, acoustic piano, organ, Mellotron, Moog synthesizer, guitars
- Chris Wood – flute, saxophones
- Rosko Gee – bass
- Jim Capaldi – drums, percussion, backing vocals (5), keyboards
- Rebop Kwaku Baah (uncredited) – congas and percussion (3, 7)

== Production ==
- Chris Blackwell – producer
- Nobby Clark – engineer
- Brian Humphries – engineer
- Jeff Willens – mastering
- Bill DeYoung – liner notes
- Martin Hughes – cover design
- Bill Levenson – reissue supervisor
- Monique McGuffin – reissue production coordination
- Vartan – reissue art director

== Charts ==
Chart (1974–1975)	Peak position
Australian Albums (Kent Music Report)	43
Canada Top Albums/CDs (RPM)	16
New Zealand Albums (RMNZ)	25
UK Albums (Official Charts)	31
US Billboard 200	9

== Certifications ==
Region	Certification	Certified units/sales
United States (RIAA)	Gold	500,000^{^}
^{^} Shipments figures based on certification alone.
