= Paper Sun =

- German single picture sleeve

Single by Traffic
- B-side: "Giving to You" (Jim Capaldi, Dave Mason, Steve Winwood, Chris Wood)
- Released: 26 May 1967
- Recorded: 23–24 April 1967
- Studio: Olympic, London
- Genre: Psychedelic pop; psychedelic rock; progressive pop
- Length: 4:14 (UK single version); 3:22 (US single version)
- Label: Island WIP 6002 (UK)
- Songwriters: Jim Capaldi, Steve Winwood
- Producer: Jimmy Miller

Traffic singles chronology
| "Paper Sun" (1967) | "Hole in My Shoe" (1967) |

"Paper Sun" is a song by British rock band Traffic, and was released as their debut single on 26 May 1967. It was a number 5 hit in the United Kingdom, number 4 in Canada.

A version faded at 3:22 peaked at number 70 on the Cash Box Top 100 chart in the United States. This version was also released on U.S. copies of the band's debut album, Mr. Fantasy (early U.S. copies of the album had the alternate title Heaven Is in Your Mind). The remainder of the song (about 52 seconds) was included as a separate track titled "We're a Fade, You Missed This."

CD inlay notes for the Jim Capaldi tribute concert stated: ‘A plan was hatched for (Steve) Winwood to leave the Spencer Davis Group the following year (1967). (Jim) Capaldi even went on tour with them in order to start writing with his new friend and collaborator. Paper Sun thus evolved from a newspaper headline Jim read in a boarding house in Newcastle. "I was half asleep, lying there, writing this lyric in my head at about 3:30 in the morning. I woke up Steve with this idea and then we went into the living room where there was a little upright piano and finished the song," said Jim.’

The song was recorded at a nightly session, spanning between 23 and 24 April 1967. It was held at Olympic Studios in Barnes, London and produced by Jimmy Miller. The song is famous for its sitar riff, played by Dave Mason, and its vocals by composer Steve Winwood. A black-and-white promotional film for the song was shot at the Royal Museum for Central Africa (AfricaMuseum) in Tervuren, Flanders, Belgium.

The song had its first UK album appearance on the 1969 compilation, Best of Traffic. It appeared on the soundtrack of the 2010 British film Made in Dagenham.

The single's B-side, a mono version of "Giving to You", features a brief opening vocal section sung by Winwood. The song was issued in a modified version (4:20) on the stereo version of Mr. Fantasy. This version begins and ends with heavily overdubbed talking. The B-side version was later released as a bonus track on a CD reissue of Mr. Fantasy.
