= Mr. Fantasy =

Studio album by Traffic
- Released: 8 December 1967
- Recorded: April–November 1967
- Studios: Olympic, London
- Genre: Psychedelic rock
- Length: 33:54
- Labels: Island; United Artists
- Producer: Jimmy Miller

Traffic chronology
Mr. Fantasy (1967)	Traffic (1968)

Singles from Mr. Fantasy
- 1. "Paper Sun" b/w "Giving to You" Released: 26 May 1967; 2. "Hole in My Shoe" b/w "Smiling Phases" Released: August 1967; 3. "Here We Go Round the Mulberry Bush" b/w "Coloured Rain" Released: 24 November 1967; 4. "No Face, No Name and No Number" b/w "(Roamin' in the Gloamin' with) 40,000 Headmen" Released: February 1968

Mr. Fantasy is the debut studio album by English rock band Traffic, released in December 1967. The recording included group members Jim Capaldi, Steve Winwood, Chris Wood, and Dave Mason; however, Mason temporarily left the band shortly after the album was released. The album reached the number 16 position in the UK Albums Chart, and number 88 on the Billboard Top LPs chart in the United States.

== Overview ==
The album was recorded at Olympic Studios in London with American record producer Jimmy Miller and recording engineer Phill Brown. When Brown was asked his favourite memory of engineering, he responded: "Recording Dear Mr Fantasy, one o'clock in the morning, November 1967."

The UK release was one of the earliest rock albums on the Island Records label. This edition had a color gatefold cover and included 10 songs. As with common practice in the 1960s, the original UK album left out hit songs from Traffic singles of the era. The sitar, an instrument widely associated with this era of Traffic due to its use on the singles "Paper Sun" and "Hole in My Shoe", is used on only one track on the UK album, "Utterly Simple".

== United States version ==
The first US version was released in early 1968 by United Artists Records and re-titled Heaven Is in Your Mind. It featured a different, non-gatefold cover showing three members of the group without Mason. For this edition, a short looping snippet of the single "Here We Go Round The Mulberry Bush" was added as a segue between most of the songs. The US LP was re-sequenced and also added three other singles (a shortened version of "Paper Sun", "Hole in My Shoe", and "Smiling Phases") but deleted two Mason songs ("Hope I Never Find Me There" and "Utterly Simple".) The final track on the US album, "We're A Fade, You Missed This", is actually the last verse of the full length "Paper Sun".

After the first pressing the title of the US album was quickly changed back to Mr. Fantasy, but the new cover and track list remained until United Artists went out of business and Island reissued the UK stereo version in the United States in 1980. This edition was also released as Mr. Fantasy in Australia and New Zealand by Festival Records after the original UK track listing had first been released in Australia simply titled Traffic. The first Canadian edition was similar to the US album but actually preceded it in December 1967 with the title Reaping in a unique cover. This album contained the full-length "Paper Sun", but dropped "Heaven Is in Your Mind" and did not have the between song segues. Reaping was discontinued and replaced by the UK stereo album in 1970.

== Different mixes and recordings ==
Both UK and US albums were released in significantly different stereo and mono mixes. These differences led to four distinct variations of the album. All of these have been re-issued on CD. The 1999 UK re-issue features the UK version in stereo and the US album in mono. In 2000 the US stereo version was re-issued on CD with its original title Heaven Is in Your Mind plus stereo bonus tracks. The same year the UK mono version was also released in the US as Mr. Fantasy with mono bonus tracks.

The song "Giving to You", was released in 3 different versions. The first was a mono B-side with lyrics in the introduction sung by Winwood. This also appeared on the US mono LP. The mono and stereo UK albums had a revised version, which was included on the US stereo album. The soundtrack album for Here We Go Round the Mulberry Bush also contains a different recording of "Utterly Simple" than the one used on this album.

"Coloured Rain" was recorded as "Colored Rain" by Eric Burdon & The New Animals featuring a guitar solo by Andy Summers. It was also recorded by The Hassles, Al Kooper and Slade. "Smiling Phases" was recorded by Blood, Sweat & Tears on their self-titled second album released in 1968. "Dealer" was recorded as part of the medley "Dealer/Spanish Rose" by Santana on their Inner Secrets album released in 1978. "Heaven is in Your Mind" was recorded by Three Dog Night and appears on the self-titled debut album and a live version is on Captured Live at the Forum.

== Reception and legacy ==
Professional ratings
Review scores
Source	Rating
AllMusic	4/5 stars

A review in the 27 April 1968 edition of Rolling Stone called the album "one of the best from any contemporary group". The reviewer felt that Steve Winwood's voice had "matured, acquired new depth and new reaches, a more individual feeling and a greater range in both style and tones", and considered that "the strongest points of this album are where the elements of Traffic's 'comprehensible far-out' and Winwood's great R&B style are combined", but deemed Mason's contributions to be good enough in their own right.

AllMusic's retrospective review is positive, calling Traffic's music "eclectic, combining their background in British pop with a taste for the comic and dance hall styles of Sgt. Pepper, Indian music, and blues-rock jamming".

In 1999, the album was added to the Grammy Hall of Fame. It was also ranked 517 in Colin Larkin's All Time Top 1000 Albums 3rd Edition in 2000.

== Track listing ==
Side one
No.	Title	Writer(s)	Lead vocals	Length
1.	"Heaven Is in Your Mind"	Jim Capaldi, Steve Winwood, Chris Wood	Winwood and Capaldi	4:16
2.	"Berkshire Poppies"	Capaldi, Winwood, Wood	Winwood	2:55
3.	"House for Everyone"	Dave Mason	Mason	2:05
4.	"No Face, No Name and No Number"	Capaldi, Winwood	Winwood	3:35
5.	"Dear Mr. Fantasy"	Capaldi, Winwood, Wood	Winwood	5:44

Side two
No.	Title	Writer(s)	Lead vocals	Length
6.	"Dealer"	Capaldi (Note: As shown on original releases. Recent releases credit this song to both Capaldi and Winwood.)	Capaldi and Winwood	3:34
7.	"Utterly Simple"	Mason	Mason	3:16
8.	"Coloured Rain"	Capaldi, Winwood, Wood	Winwood	2:43
9.	"Hope I Never Find Me There"	Mason	Mason	2:12
10.	"Giving to You" (album version)	Capaldi, Mason, Winwood, Wood	None	4:20

Mono bonus tracks from the US 2000 CD release
No.	Title	Writer(s)	Lead vocals	Length
11.	"Paper Sun"	Capaldi, Winwood	Winwood	4:15
12.	"Giving to You" (mono single version)	Capaldi, Mason, Winwood, Wood	Winwood	4:12
13.	"Hole in My Shoe"	Mason	Mason	2:54
14.	"Smiling Phases"	Capaldi, Winwood, Wood	Winwood	2:43
15.	"Here We Go Round the Mulberry Bush"	Capaldi, Mason, Winwood, Wood	Group (solo parts on chorus and bridge by Winwood)	2:18

=== Original US version ===
Side one
No.	Title	Writer(s)	Lead vocals	Length
1.	"Paper Sun"	Capaldi, Winwood	Winwood	3:26
2.	"Dealer"	Capaldi	Capaldi and Winwood	3:13
3.	"Coloured Rain"	Capaldi, Winwood, Wood	Winwood	2:46
4.	"Hole in My Shoe"	Mason	Mason	3:04
5.	"No Face, No Name and No Number"	Capaldi, Winwood	Winwood	3:38
6.	"Heaven Is in Your Mind"	Capaldi, Winwood, Wood	Winwood and Capaldi	4:22

Side two
No.	Title	Writer(s)	Lead vocals	Length
7.	"House for Everyone"	Mason	Mason	2:05
8.	"Berkshire Poppies"	Capaldi, Winwood, Wood	Winwood	2:59
9.	"Giving to You" (stereo album version; mono album has the mono single mix)	Capaldi, Mason, Winwood, Wood	None	4:18
10.	"Smiling Phases"	Capaldi, Winwood, Wood	Winwood	2:44
11.	"Dear Mr. Fantasy"	Capaldi, Winwood, Wood	Winwood	5:33
12.	"We're a Fade, You Missed This"	Capaldi, Winwood	Winwood	0:53

Stereo bonus tracks from the US 2000 CD release
No.	Title	Writer(s)	Lead vocals	Length
13.	"Utterly Simple"	Mason	Mason	3:17
14.	"Hope I Never Find Me There"	Mason	Mason	2:09
15.	"Here We Go Round the Mulberry Bush"	Capaldi, Mason, Winwood, Wood	Group (solo parts on chorus and bridge by Winwood)	2:35
16.	"Am I What I Was or Am I What I Am"	Capaldi, Winwood, Wood	Winwood	2:32

== Personnel ==
Traffic

- Jim Capaldi – drums, percussion, vocals
- Dave Mason – guitar, Mellotron, sitar, tambura, harmonica, percussion, bass guitar on "Dear Mr. Fantasy" and "Dealer", vocals
- Steve Winwood – Hammond organ, guitar, bass guitar, piano, harpsichord, percussion, vocals, arrangements
- Chris Wood – flute, saxophone, Hammond organ, percussion, vocals, sleeve design

with:

- Jimmy Miller – producer, maracas on "Dear Mr. Fantasy"
- Small Faces (Steve Marriott, Ronnie Lane, Ian McLagan, Kenney Jones) – backing vocals and percussion on "Berkshire Poppies"
- Francine Heimann – spoken-word midsection on "Hole in My Shoe" (uncredited) from US Version

Technical

- Eddie Kramer – engineer
- John Benton-Harris – photography
- Margaret Goldfarb – re-release coordinator

== Charts ==
Chart (1967–1968)	Peak position
UK Albums (Official Charts)	16
US Billboard 200	88
