= Traffic (Traffic album) =

- Members from left to right: Jim Capaldi, Chris Wood, Steve Winwood, Dave Mason.

Studio album by Traffic
- Released: 20 September 1968
- Recorded: January–May 1968
- Studios: Olympic, London; Record Plant, New York
- Genres: Folk rock, jazz fusion
- Length: 40:24
- Labels: Island; United Artists
- Producer: Jimmy Miller

Traffic chronology
Mr. Fantasy (1967)	Traffic (1968)	Last Exit (1969)

Singles from Traffic
- 1. "Feelin' Alright?" Released: September 1968

Traffic is the self-titled second studio album by the English rock band Traffic, released on 20 September 1968 on Island Records in the United Kingdom as ILPS 9081T (stereo), and United Artists in the United States, as UAS 6676 (stereo). The album peaked at number 9 in the UK Albums Chart and at number 17 on the Billboard Top LPs chart. It was the last album recorded by the group before their initial breakup.

== Background and content ==
In January 1968, after some initial success in Britain with their debut album Mr. Fantasy, Dave Mason had departed from the group. He produced the debut album by the group Family, containing in its ranks future Traffic bass player Ric Grech, while Traffic went on the road. In May, the band had invited Mason back to begin recording the new album.

The album was somewhat of a departure from the psychedelia of Traffic's debut, featuring a more eclectic display of influences from blues to folk and jazz. Mason ended up writing and singing half of the songs on the album (including his biggest hit "Feelin' Alright?"), but making scant contribution to the songs written by Jim Capaldi and Steve Winwood. His flair for pop melody had always been at odds with the others' jazz ambitions, evidenced by the dichotomy seen for the songs on this album, and by October he was again out of the band. He would return one more time for a tour and album in 1971 to run out the band's contract.

Traffic was reissued for compact disc in the UK on 11 January 2000, with five bonus tracks, two from the soundtrack to the United Artists film Here We Go Round the Mulberry Bush and three from Last Exit. In the US, the remastered reissue of 27 February 2001 included mono single mixes of "You Can All Join In" and "Feelin' Alright?", and the stereo single mix of "Withering Tree". The original album was produced by Jimmy Miller. The remasters were assisted in their production by Jim Capaldi.

== Reception ==
Professional ratings
Review scores
Source	Rating
AllMusic	5/5 stars
Rolling Stone	(positive)
The Encyclopedia of Popular Music	5/5 stars

Both Rolling Stone in the US and Disc & Music Echo in the UK gave highly positive reviews at the time of release, with the latter calling it "an album of pure pleasure" and declaring Traffic to be "one of the most perfect musical groups in the world." Melody Maker enthused that the album showed tremendous pace and originality, more accurately reflecting their live act. AllMusic gives a five-star retrospective review of the album, commenting that it achieved a strong balance between Dave Mason's simple and straightforward folk-rock songs and Steve Winwood's complex and often haunting rock jams.

It was voted number 312 in Colin Larkin's All Time Top 1000 Albums 3rd edition (2000). The album was also included in the book 1001 Albums You Must Hear Before You Die.

== Track listing and personnel ==
Side one
No.	Title	Writer(s)	Personnel	Length
1.	"You Can All Join In"	Dave Mason	Personnel: Dave Mason – lead vocals, guitar; Steve Winwood – electric guitar, bass guitar, backing vocals; Chris Wood – tenor saxophone; Jim Capaldi – drums, backing vocals	3:34
2.	"Pearly Queen"	Capaldi, Winwood	Personnel: Winwood – lead vocals, Hammond organ, electric guitar, bass guitar; Wood – flute; Mason – harmonica; Capaldi – drums	4:20
3.	"Don't Be Sad"	Mason	Personnel: Mason – lead vocals, harmonica, electric guitar; Winwood – lead vocals, Hammond organ, rhythm guitar, organ bass; Wood – soprano saxophone; Capaldi – drums, backing vocals	3:24
4.	"Who Knows What Tomorrow May Bring"	Capaldi, Winwood, Wood (Note: The original LP issue credits the song to Winwood/Capaldi. However, both BMI records and later issues of the album list Chris Wood as co-writer.)	Personnel: Winwood – lead vocals, Hammond organ, guitars, bass guitar; Capaldi – drums, percussion, backing vocals	3:11
5.	"Feelin' Alright?"	Mason	Personnel: Mason – lead vocals, guitar; Winwood – piano, bass guitar, backing vocals; Wood – tenor saxophone, backing vocals; Capaldi – drums, percussion	4:16

Side two
No.	Title	Writer(s)	Personnel	Length
6.	"Vagabond Virgin"	Mason, Capaldi	Personnel: Mason – lead vocals, guitar; Capaldi – lead vocals, drums, percussion; Winwood – piano, bass guitar, backing vocals; Wood – flute	5:21
7.	"Forty Thousand Headmen"	Capaldi, Winwood	Personnel: Winwood – vocals, guitar, organ, organ bass; Wood – flute, Coke tin, sleigh bells; Capaldi – drums	3:15
8.	"Cryin' to Be Heard"	Mason	Personnel: Mason – lead vocals, bass guitar; Winwood – Hammond organ, harpsichord, backing vocals; Wood – soprano and tenor saxophone; Capaldi – drums, backing vocals	5:14
9.	"No Time to Live"	Capaldi, Winwood	Personnel: Winwood – vocals, piano, bass guitar; Wood – soprano saxophone; Mason – Hammond organ; Capaldi – drums	5:10
10.	"Means to an End"	Capaldi, Winwood	Personnel: Winwood – vocals, piano, electric guitar, bass guitar; Wood – drums, percussion (Note: The album credits list Wood as the drummer, but this is presumably a mistake, since no other source indicates that Chris Wood knew how to play drums. Most likely the track is Capaldi and Winwood, as on "Who Knows What Tomorrow May Bring".)	2:39
Total length:				40:24

2000 reissue bonus tracks (UK only)
No.	Title	Writer(s)	Personnel	Length
11.	"Here We Go 'Round the Mulberry Bush" (from the film Here We Go Round the Mulberry Bush)	Capaldi, Mason, Winwood, Wood		2:45
12.	"Am I What I Was or Am I What I Am" (from the film Here We Go Round the Mulberry Bush)	Capaldi, Winwood, Wood		2:36
13.	"Withering Tree" (B-side to the single Feelin' Alright? – stereo single mix)	Capaldi, Winwood	Personnel: Winwood – vocals, piano, guitar, bass guitar; Wood – flute, percussion; Capaldi – drums, percussion	2:57
14.	"Medicated Goo" (A-side of a UK 1968 single – stereo mix)	Winwood, Jimmy Miller		3:39
15.	"Shanghai Noodle Factory" (B-side of Medicated Goo – stereo mix)	Capaldi, Miller, Winwood, Wood, Larry Fallon		5:03

2001 reissue bonus tracks US (Island Records 314 542 852-2) and Japan (Universal-Island Records UICY-93642) only
No.	Title	Writer(s)	Length
11.	"You Can All Join In" (mono single mix)	Mason	3:45
12.	"Feelin' Alright?" (mono single mix)	Mason	4:03
13.	"Withering Tree" (stereo single mix)	Capaldi, Winwood	2:53

== Additional personnel ==
- Terry Brown, Eddie Kramer, Glyn Johns, Brian Humphries – sound engineers
- Richard Polak, Gered Mankowitz – photography

== Charts ==
Chart (1968–1969)	Peak position
Canada Top Albums/CDs (RPM)	15
UK Albums (Official Charts)	9
US Billboard 200	17
