= Chris Wood (rock musician) =

British musician (1944–1983)

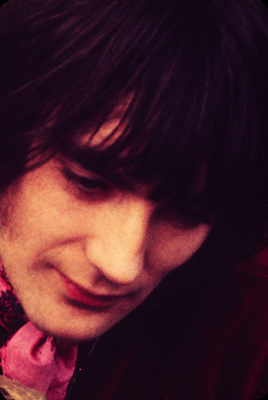
- Wood in 1969

Background information
- Born: Christopher Gordon Blandford Wood; 24 June 1944; Quinton, Birmingham, England
- Died: 12 July 1983 (aged 39) Birmingham, England
- Genres: Rock; progressive rock; jazz fusion
- Occupation: Musician
- Instruments: Saxophone; flute; keyboards
- Years active: 1962–1983
- Formerly of: Locomotive; Traffic; Mason Capaldi Wood & Frog; Ginger Baker's Air Force
- Website: chriswood-lunarmusic.com

Christopher Gordon Blandford Wood (24 June 1944 – 12 July 1983) was a British rock musician, best known as a founding member of the rock band Traffic, along with Steve Winwood, Jim Capaldi and Dave Mason.

== Early life ==
Chris Wood was born in 1944, in Quinton, Birmingham. Wood had an interest in music and painting from an early childhood. He was self-taught on flute and saxophone, which he began playing at the age of 15.

He attended the Stourbridge College of Art, then the Birmingham School of Art (Painting Dept.) and subsequently was awarded a grant to attend the Royal Academy of Art starting in December 1965.

== Career ==
=== Early years ===
18-year-old Wood joined the Steve Hadley Quartet, a jazz/blues group in 1962. Wood began to play locally with other Birmingham musicians who would later find international fame in music: Christine Perfect (later Christine McVie), Carl Palmer, Stan Webb and Mike Kellie. In 1964, Wood played with Webb and Perfect in the band Shades of Blue. From 1965–1966, he played with Kellie in the jazz band Locomotive. During this time, Wood was attending college and would on occasion perform with the band. He prematurely left college, and decided to pursue a career in music.

His younger sister Stephanie Wood designed clothes for the Spencer Davis Group, based in Birmingham, and it was through her that Wood was first introduced to fellow Birmingham native Steve Winwood. A well-known Birmingham club, the Elbow Room, was an after-hours venue for local bands and musicians, and it was here that Wood used to meet up with Winwood and Jim Capaldi. In 1967, 18-year-old Winwood abandoned the Spencer Davis Group at the height of their popularity, and along with Wood, Capaldi and Dave Mason, formed the psychedelic rock group Traffic.

=== Traffic: 1967–1969 ===
In 1967, in order to focus his fledgling band Traffic, Island Records' founder Chris Blackwell arranged for the four band members to retreat to an isolated farmhouse on the Berkshire Downs, near Aston Tirrold. Initially without electricity, telephone or running water, The Cottage (as it became universally known) was so remote that a generator had to be installed to power the group's equipment. A concrete outdoor stage was built with the band's stage equipment set up to overlook the surrounding fields. After six months honing their music, Traffic released their first single, "Paper Sun".

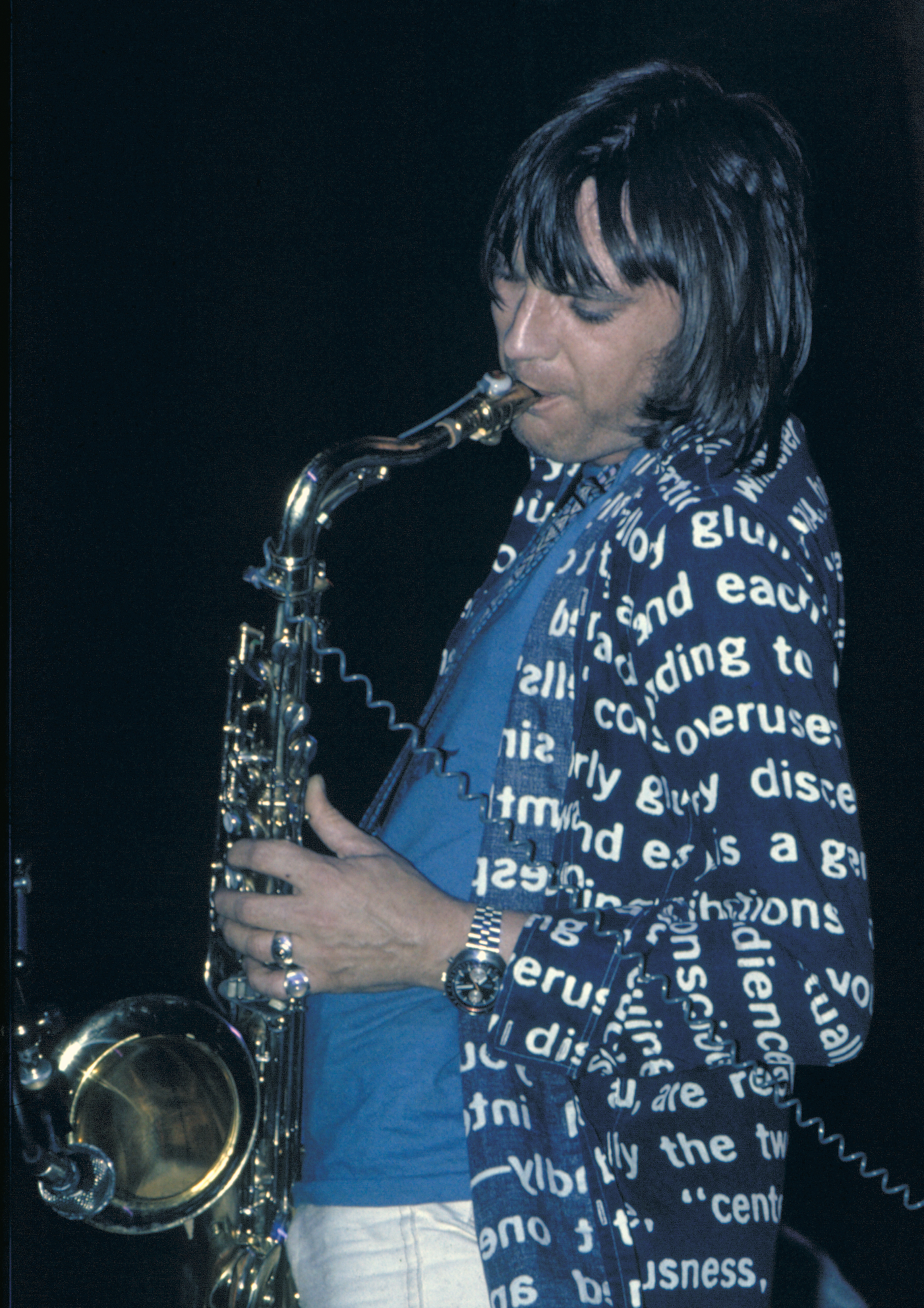
Onstage with Traffic

In Traffic, Wood primarily played flute and saxophone, occasionally contributing keyboards, bass and vocals. Wood also co-wrote several of Traffic's songs, particularly during the earlier period of the band's recording career. His most notable contribution is as the co-writer (with Winwood and Capaldi), of "Dear Mr. Fantasy".

He [Chris Wood] used to study maps and charts and watch birds. He brought to us music that we had never heard before, from Japanese classical music to obscure jazz, Yorkshire folk songs, he actually helped us to define the music we were making. He was kind of the spiritual leader [of the band].

— Steve Winwood, BBC English Soul: Steve Winwood (2010)

=== Session work: 1968–1970 ===
Wood and Winwood played with Jimi Hendrix, and both appeared on the 1968 album Electric Ladyland (1968). He played the flute on the song "1983... (A Merman I Should Turn to Be)". During the album recording session, Wood met then-17-year-old Jeanette Jacobs (formerly of the 1960s girl group The Cake). Originally from New York, she had briefly come to London, accompanying Hendrix. The two would later marry. In 1969, Traffic recorded a jam session with Hendrix. Wood was then invited to perform in concert with the Jimi Hendrix Experience at the Royal Albert Hall, in South Kensington, London, on 24 February 1969. The concert was filmed, with Wood appearing on the song "Room Full of Mirrors".

In 1969, Wood's talents appeared on a series of albums. On the eponymous 1969 self-titled second album of Free, he played the flute on "Mourning Sad Morning". For Nick Drake's Five Leaves Left 1969 debut album, Wood added flute on the song "Three Hours" accompanied by future Traffic member Rebop Kwaku Baah. The alternative version was previously unreleased, until 2017. Wood also applied his sax talents to Gordon Jackson's song "Snake & Ladders". It was previously believed that Wood featured on the Small Faces' The Autumn Stone (1969), but the flute work was credited to Lyn Dobson.

=== Wood, Mason and Capaldi & Frog: 1969 ===
When Winwood temporarily formed supergroup Blind Faith in 1969, Wood, Mason and Capaldi joined Mick Weaver (otherwise known as Wynder K. Frog), to become Mason, Capaldi, Wood and Frog. After this stint, Wood travelled to the United States and went to tour with Dr. John (Malcolm John Rebennack), a New Orleans pianist. Wood was reunited with singer and future wife Jeanette Jacobs.

=== Ginger Baker's Air Force: 1970 ===
In 1970, Wood and Jacobs travelled back to London, and along with Steve Winwood, joined Ginger Baker's Air Force. The unified supergroup released one album, before Wood re-joined Traffic.

=== Traffic: 1970–1974 ===
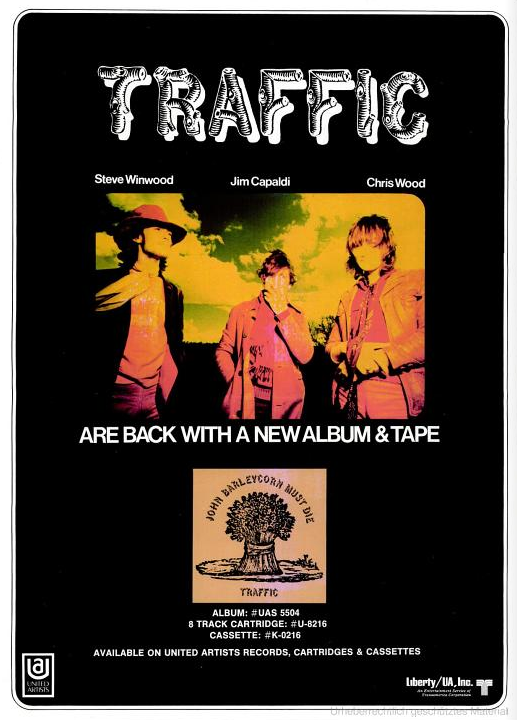
Traffic's poster advert for John Barleycorn Must Die (1970)

Wood remained with Traffic from the time of its reformation in 1970, until the group's breakup in 1974. In the recording sessions, Wood introduced the 17th-century traditional song "John Barleycorn" to the band after hearing it on The Watersons album Frost and Fire. It became the title song of their 1970 album John Barleycorn Must Die.

In the subsequent reincarnation of Traffic, Rebop Kwaku Baah joined in 1971, providing the band with a rhythmic base and dynamism. By the 1970s, Wood came into his own and led the band on an emotional, artistic and mood-setting venture into music. They released The Low Spark of High Heeled Boys (1971) and Shoot Out at the Fantasy Factory (1973), featuring Wood's self-composed song "Tragic Magic".

=== Session work: 1970s ===
Throughout the existence of Traffic, Wood was in demand as a session musician with his immediately identifiable flute or saxophone playing. He featured on albums for fellow band members Jim Capaldi, Rebop Kwaku Baah, as well as John Martyn, Tyrone Downie, Fat Mattress, Gordon Jackson, Crawler, The Sky, and Bobby Whitlock among others.

== Personal life and health ==
Wood and Jeanette Jacobs married in November 1972, at Kensington Register Office, when he was 28 and she was 22. His wife was unfaithful while he was on tour with Traffic, leading to increased drinking, and to the culmination of liver disease. Wood eventually cut down on drinking, but his medication caused further complications. Throughout his life, Wood had suffered from addiction to drugs and alcohol, which were initially attributed to a fear of flying. His wife Jeanette, from whom he had separated, died in 1982, at the age of 31, from the effects of a seizure. Wood was profoundly affected by her death.

== Death and legacy ==
The death of two close friends, Free's Paul Kossoff and former bandmate Rebop Kwaku Baah, along with his former wife, weighed very heavily on Wood. In the summer of 1983, Wood suffered from pneumonia. On 12 July 1983, Wood died of liver disease at age 39, at Queen Elizabeth Hospital in Birmingham.

=== Vulcan (1983, 2008) ===
Around the time of his death, Wood was working on a solo album that was to be titled Vulcan. He had recorded material for the album over the previous few years, mostly in London at Island's Hammersmith Studio, The Fall Out Shelter, with engineer Terry Barham, as well as at Pathway Studios in London. Following Wood's death, the Vulcan recordings remained in the possession of Wood's sister, Stephanie. In 2008, with the consent of Stephanie Wood a CD titled Vulcan, consisting of selected material Wood recorded while working on the incomplete album (plus an unreleased Traffic live performance of one of Wood's compositions), was released by Esoteric Recordings.

=== Far from Home (1994) ===
Traffic recorded one additional studio album, Far from Home (1994), after Wood's death. The album was dedicated to him, and the central figure on the front cover is a stick figure of a man playing flute.

=== Evening Blue (2017) ===
In June 2013, on what would have been Wood's 69th birthday, the Chris Wood Estate (run by his sister, Stephanie) announced that a commemorative box set was being prepared – in collaboration with contemporary music archivists HiddenMasters, to properly honour Wood's life in music. Among other music, the set included the album Vulcan as Chris had originally sequenced it in 1978. The box set Evening Blue was finally released, three and a half years later, in early 2017. It was a special deluxe first edition, limited to 1,000 copies.

For the album booklet, Wood's own instruments were photographed. Jayne Gould, from HiddenMasters, was in charge of the photoshoot in Berkshire Downs, returning to the location of Traffic's cottage. While photographing Wood's flute on a fencepost by the barleycorn field, his flute "got up, stood on its edge, played a few notes about eight or nine, and went back down flat again. It all happened in two minutes." The following weekend, Gould visited a village fête and randomly met Steve Winwood. She recalled the spiritual incident with Wood's flute to him and Winwood confirmed, "Yeah, that would be Chris."

== Discography ==
=== Solo ===
- Vulcan (compilation) (2008)
- Evening Blue (box set) (2017)
- Moon Child Vulcan (2017)

=== with Traffic ===
- Mr. Fantasy (1967)
- Traffic (1968)
- Last Exit (1969)
- John Barleycorn Must Die (1970)
- The Low Spark of High Heeled Boys (1971)
- Welcome to the Canteen (1971)
- Shoot Out at the Fantasy Factory (1973)
- On the Road (1973)
- When the Eagle Flies (1974)
- Heavy Traffic (1975)
- More Heavy Traffic (1975)

=== with Ginger Baker's Air Force ===
- Ginger Baker's Air Force (1970)

=== with others ===
- Electric Ladyland (The Jimi Hendrix Experience, 1968)
- Free (Free, 1969)
- Fat Mattress (Fat Mattress, 1969)
- Fiends and Angels (Martha Velez, 1969)
- O.K. Ken? (Chicken Shack, 1969)
- Thinking Back (Gordon Jackson, 1969)
- We Are Everything You See (Locomotive, 1969)
- Contribution (Shawn Phillips, 1970)
- Don't Hold Back (There In The Greenbriar) (Sky, 1970)
- The Cry of Love (Jimi Hendrix, 1971)
- Oh How We Danced (Jim Capaldi, 1972)
- Rebop (Reebop Kwaku Baah, 1972)
- Inside Out (John Martyn, 1973)
- Now Hear This (Hanson, 1973)
- Music from Free Creek (Free Creek, 1973; re-released 1976 as Summit Meeting)
- Short Cut Draw Blood (Jim Capaldi, 1975)
- 96 Degrees In The Shade (Third World, 1977)
- Crawler (Crawler, 1977)
- The Story's Been Told (Third World, 1979)
- Funky (Spencer Davis Group, 1997)
