= Jim Capaldi =

English musician (1944–2005)

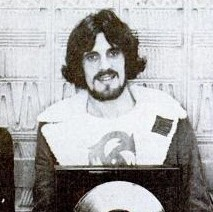
- Capaldi accepting a Gold record for Traffic in 1972

Background information
- Born: Nicola James Capaldi; 2 August 1944; Evesham, Worcestershire, England
- Died: 28 January 2005 (aged 60) Westminster, London, England
- Genres: Progressive rock; pop rock; soft rock
- Occupations: Musician; songwriter
- Instruments: Drums; percussion; vocals; guitar; keyboards
- Years active: 1960–2005
- Labels: Island; RSO; WEA
- Formerly of: The Sapphires; The Hellions; Traffic; Mason, Capaldi, Wood & Frog; Space Cadets
- Website: jimcapaldi.com

Nicola James Capaldi (2 August 1944 – 28 January 2005) was an English singer-songwriter and drummer. His musical career spanned more than four decades. He co-founded the progressive rock band Traffic in 1967 with Steve Winwood, and the two of them co-wrote the majority of the band's material. He was inducted into the Rock and Roll Hall of Fame as a part of Traffic's original lineup.

Capaldi also performed with Jimi Hendrix, Eric Clapton, George Harrison, Alvin Lee, Cat Stevens, and Mylon LeFevre, and wrote lyrics for other artists, such as "Love Will Keep Us Alive" and "This is Reggae Music". As a solo artist he scored more than a half dozen chart hits in various countries, the best-known being "That's Love" as well as his cover of "Love Hurts".

== Career ==
=== Early years ===
Capaldi was born Nicola James Capaldi in Evesham, Worcestershire, to English parents Marie (née Couchier) and Nicholas Capaldi. His father was born Nicola Capaldi in 1913 in Evesham to Italian parents. As a child, Capaldi studied piano and voice with his father, a music teacher, and by his teens he was playing drums with his friends. At age 14, he founded the band the Sapphires and served as their lead vocalist. At 16 he took an apprenticeship at a factory in Worcester, where he met Keith Miller and Dave Mason. In 1963 he formed the Hellions, with Mason on guitar and Gordon Jackson on rhythm guitar, while Capaldi himself switched to drums. In August 1964, Tanya Day took the Hellions to the Star-Club in Hamburg, Germany, as her backing group. The Spencer Davis Group were staying at the same hotel as the Hellions and it was there that Steve Winwood befriended Capaldi and Mason.

Back in Worcester, the Hellions provided backing to visiting performers including Adam Faith and Dave Berry. By the end of 1964, they had a London residency at the Whisky a Go Go Club. In 1964–65 the band released three singles, but none charted. Later that year John "Poli" Palmer joined the band on drums and Capaldi became the lead vocalist.

The Hellions moved back to Worcester in 1966 where they changed their name to the Revolution, releasing a fourth single that also failed to chart. Disillusioned, Dave Mason left the band. Capaldi replaced Mason with Luther Grosvenor and renamed the band Deep Feeling. Capaldi, Jackson, and Palmer wrote original songs for the band that were heavier than the Hellions repertoire. They played gigs in Birmingham and the surrounding Black Country area; former Yardbirds manager Giorgio Gomelsky offered them a recording contract. They recorded several studio tracks from 1966 to 1968 which remained unreleased until 2009, when the album Pretty Colours was released by Sunbeam Records.

=== First success ===
Capaldi and the band played frequently in London, and Jimi Hendrix played guitar with them at the Knuckles Club as an unknown musician. Back in Birmingham Capaldi would occasionally join his friends Mason, Winwood, and Chris Wood for after-hours impromptu performances at The Elbow Room club on Aston High Street. Early in 1967 they formalised this arrangement by forming Traffic, and Deep Feeling disbanded.

The new band was signed by Island Records and rented a quiet cottage in Aston Tirrold, Berkshire, to write and rehearse new material. The cottage did not remain quiet and had frequent visitors including Eric Burdon, Eric Clapton, and Pete Townshend as well as Trevor Burton (of The Move) amongst many others.

Capaldi wrote the lyrics for Traffic's first single "Paper Sun", which appeared in the UK singles chart at number 5 in summer 1967. This was the beginning of a songwriting partnership between him and Winwood which would produce the overwhelming majority of Traffic's songs: With the exception of "No Face, No Name, No Number", Capaldi would pen a lyric first, and then hand it over to Winwood to write the music.

Despite his key role in writing the band's material, Capaldi rarely sang lead vocals with Traffic, and his lyrics were nearly always keyed towards Winwood's soulful voice rather than his own more hard-edged vocal style.

Two more Traffic singles were released successfully in 1967, and in December the band released the album Mr. Fantasy. After one further album, Traffic, the group disbanded.

=== Traffic revival ===
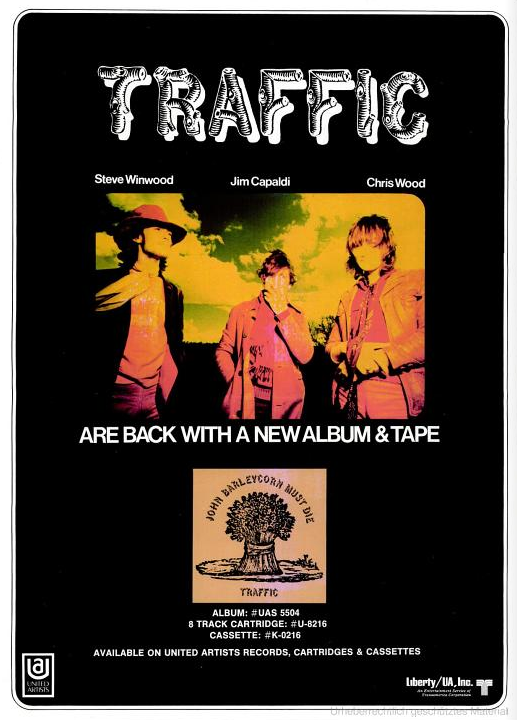
Capaldi (middle) in a Billboard advertisement for the Traffic album John Barleycorn Must Die in 1970.

Capaldi formed another band with Mason, Wood, and Mick Weaver but the creative tensions that had caused Mason to leave Traffic remained and the resulting quartet lasted only until March 1969. In January 1970 Capaldi and Wood joined Winwood in the studio to record Winwood's solo album. These sessions were so successful that the three of them reformed Traffic to release the album John Barleycorn Must Die. They then toured the UK and the US with an expanded line-up, which would go on to produce the hit albums Welcome to the Canteen and The Low Spark of High Heeled Boys. The title track of the latter, a cynical treatise on the music industry, would prove to be one of Capaldi's most famous lyrics. In addition, "Rock and Roll Stew (part 1)", a rare instance of a Traffic song with Capaldi on lead vocal, was a minor hit in the US.

=== Final Traffic years, first solo years ===
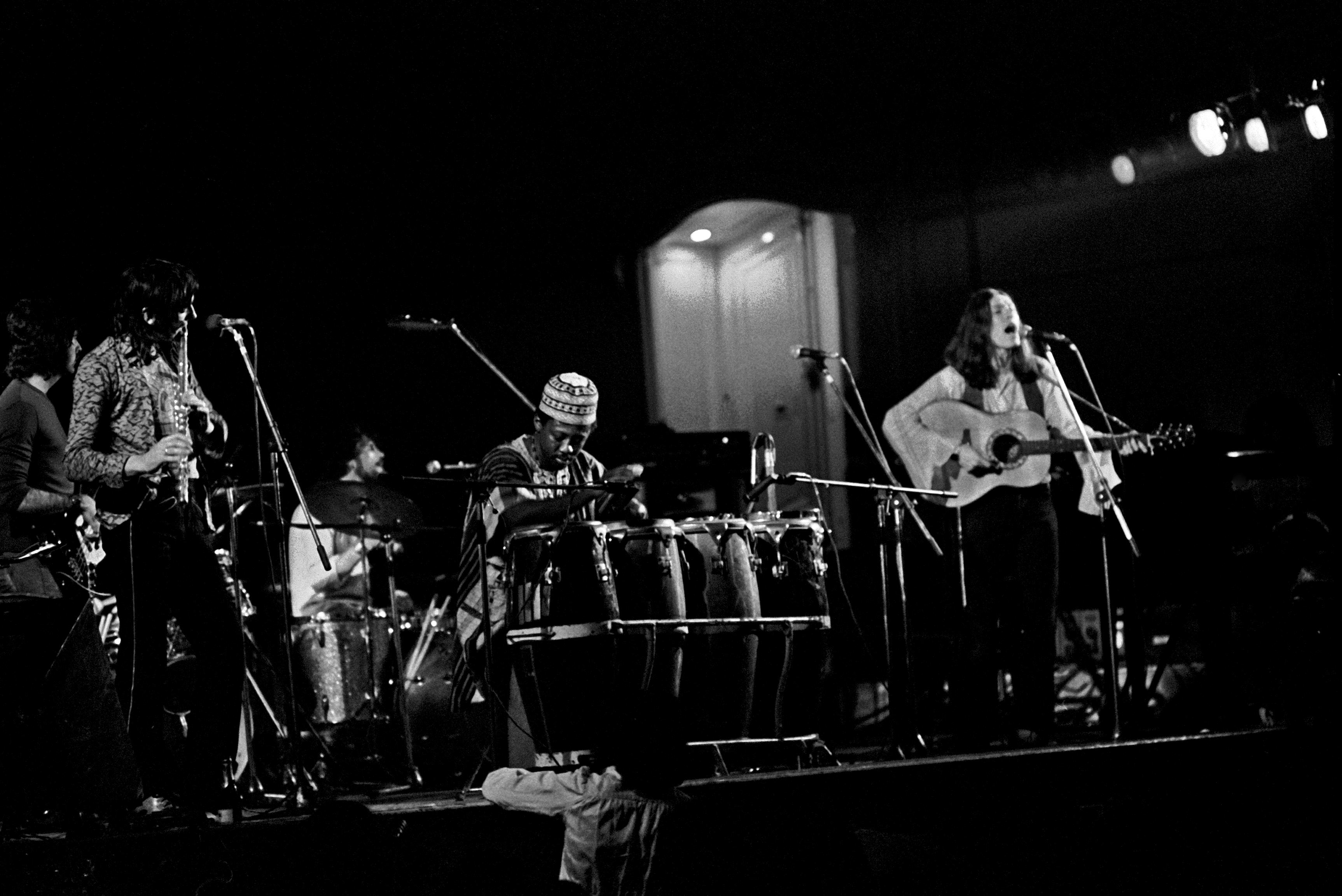
Traffic onstage in 1973. Capaldi is in the middle of the five musicians in this photo, somewhat obscured in the background.

With Traffic on hiatus due to Steve Winwood's struggles with peritonitis, Capaldi recorded a solo album Oh How We Danced in 1972. This set contained a broad variety of musical styles and featured contributions from Free guitarist Paul Kossoff, the Muscle Shoals Rhythm Section, and several members of Traffic. It was well received by critics and proved to be a modest success in the US, encouraging Capaldi to pursue a solo career alongside his work with Traffic.

After two more albums with Traffic, the group took a short break, allowing Capaldi to record Whale Meat Again, which was slightly less successful than his debut both in terms of reviews and sales. The title track was a thoroughly hard rocking and unapologetic environmentalist tirade; aggressive sociopolitical-themed songs became a recurring theme in Capaldi's work. He began work on his third solo album, Short Cut Draw Blood, alongside recording When the Eagle Flies with Traffic. As the band set off on the supporting tour, an early single from Short Cut, "It's All Up to You", made the UK Top 40. Though Capaldi's first major solo hit, it proved only a prelude to the album's chief success. Traffic disbanded after the tour, leaving Capaldi to focus all his efforts on his solo career. Short Cut Draw Blood appeared the following year. In October 1975, a single taken from the album, a cover version of The Everly Brothers' "Love Hurts", reached number four in the UK chart and charted worldwide. The album is considered by many to be his masterpiece, tackling issues such as the environment, government corruption, and drugs. He also embarked on a very brief acting career, appearing in the rarely seen 30-minute short film Short Ends (1976), which was directed by Esther Anderson and co-starred Judy Geeson and Hilary Baker.

=== To disco and back ===
However, events would conspire to prevent Capaldi from consolidating his solo stardom. He began working on his next album, Play it by Ear, alongside serving as a major collaborator on Steve Winwood's debut solo album. Play it by Ear took an unusually long time to record, and in the meantime, his long-standing relationship with Island Records fell apart. The album was cancelled as a result, even though an advance single, "Goodbye My Love" (no connection to "Goodbye Love" from Capaldi's previous album), had already been released. Capaldi later described his leaving Island Records as "a leap into the wilderness." Due to these delays, it was over two years after Short Cut Draw Blood that another Jim Capaldi album appeared.

At this time Capaldi wrote the soundtrack to the award-winning film "The Contender", his last recording with the Muscle Shoals Rhythm Section as his backing band, and correspondingly put together a new backing band for himself called the Contenders. The group consisted of Pete Bonas (guitar), Chris Parren (miscellaneous keyboards), Ray Allen (saxophone, backing vocals, percussion), and Phil Capaldi (backing vocals, percussion). Bonas was a particularly significant collaborator, and would co-write many of Capaldi's songs. The band chiefly supported him on tour; only one album, Electric Nights, featured the Contenders on every track. At the encouragement of his new label, RSO Records, Capaldi began venturing into disco. His first album with the label, The Contender, was released in the US with the title Daughter of the Night and a partially different set of songs. However, the album's internationally released single, "Daughter of the Night", failed to make a major impact.

The follow-up, 1979's Electric Nights, was more successful. "Shoe Shine", which combined disco rhythms and melodies with an angry lead vocal and lyrics about poverty and destitution, reached number 11 in France and also entered Billboard's Dance Music/Club Play Singles chart. However, despite including both hard rockers such as "Elixir of Life" and "Hotel Blues" and laments such as "Short Ends" and "Wild Geese" alongside the disco-flavoured numbers, Capaldi retained no fondness for his two albums with RSO, later saying "frankly, they got buried under a pile of disco."

Switching record labels again, Capaldi dropped the disco elements entirely for his next two albums, The Sweet Smell of... Success (1980) and Let the Thunder Cry (1981). The albums were evenly split between mellow pop and embittered hard rock, with "Success" sporting a morbid before/after cover, and some tracks incorporated a Latin influence from Capaldi's new home, Brazil. However, though "Child in the Storm" reached number 75 in the Netherlands, there was nothing resembling a major hit, not even the folk arrangement of Traffic's "The Low Spark of High-Heeled Boys".

The album Let the Thunder Cry was released in Brazil by Young/RGE in early 1981 and spawned two big hits there: "Old Photographs", a cover version of "Casinha branca" originally recorded by Gilson in 1979; and "Favella Music". "Old Photographs" became a hit after it was included in the international soundtrack of the Rede Globo soap opera Brilhante in late 1981. "Favella Music" was also a hit in late 1981.

=== Return to stardom ===
Capaldi and Winwood had maintained a working partnership since Traffic's dissolution, contributing to nearly all of each other's solo albums. With his eighth solo album, Capaldi enlisted his old partner as a major collaborator. For the first time, Capaldi played most of the drums himself, and he would continue to do so on future solo albums. However, most of the tracks on Fierce Heart were mixed to place emphasis on the synthesizers, often muting Capaldi's vocals. This synth-heavy pop sound was exactly what 1980s audiences were looking for, and "That's Love" became his biggest hit in the US, climbing to number 28 in the summer of 1983. Another single from the album, "Living on the Edge", made it to number 75, while the album made it to 91 in the Billboard 200.

This time Capaldi was able to quickly produce a follow-up, but despite his recent success and appearances by Steve Marriott, Snowy White, and Carlos Santana, 1984's One Man Mission failed to produce a hit. The album leaned more towards hard rock than Fierce Heart, but drum machines and synthesizers remained major components. In 1988, Capaldi released Some Come Running. Though the album failed to live up to commercial expectations, it reached number 183 in the US and number 46 in Sweden, while achieving two hit singles in the Netherlands. Though Eric Clapton and George Harrison appeared on "Oh Lord, Why Lord", it was "Something so Strong" which became his biggest hit in the Netherlands, breaking the top 40 and powering the album itself into the charts.

Some Come Running essentially marked the end of Capaldi's career as a solo artist. He would not record another solo album for well over a decade, though a greatest hits compilation, Prince of Darkness, was released in 1995 and made the charts in the Netherlands.

=== Collaborations ===
Capaldi's success as a lyricist continued throughout his life. In 1990 "One and Only Man", a Steve Winwood song for which Capaldi wrote the lyrics, reached the Top 20 in the US. He was a five times winner of BMI/Ascap Awards for the "most played compositions in America", and sales of songs written or co-written by him exceeded 25 million units. He numbered Bob Marley among his friends, and they travelled together while Marley was writing the Catch A Fire album. Capaldi wrote the lyrics to "This Is Reggae Music".

Capaldi was noted for the extent of his collaborations with other musicians. In 1973, he played drums at Eric Clapton's Rainbow Concert and on some Clapton studio sessions. Capaldi collaborated with Robert Calvert of Hawkwind on his critically acclaimed 1974 solo album Captain Lockheed and the Starfighters, contributing as a vocal actor on the concept album's theatrical sections between songs. In the 1980s, Capaldi collaborated with Carlos Santana contributing songs and ideas to Santana's projects and in the 1990s he co-wrote (with Paul Carrack) the song "Love Will Keep Us Alive", which was eventually used on the Eagles' successful Hell Freezes Over album. In 1994, Traffic reformed and toured the US and UK. Capaldi and Winwood recorded a new album, Far from Home, without the other members of the band. In 1998 he paired up again with Mason on an extensive American tour.

=== The final years ===
In 2001, Capaldi's eleventh solo album Living on the Outside featured George Harrison, Steve Winwood, Paul Weller, Gary Moore, and Ian Paice. George Harrison played guitar on the track "Anna Julia", an English translation of a song by the Brazilian band Los Hermanos. Both Capaldi brothers played at the Concert for George in 2002.

== Personal life ==
Capaldi married Brazilian-born Ana E. S. Campos in 1975 in All Saints Church, Marlow and in 1976 toured with his band Space Cadets before moving to Brazil in 1977.

He had two daughters: Tabitha, born in 1976, and Tallulah, born in 1979. The Capaldis lived in the Bahia region of Brazil until the beginning of 1980 and while there he became heavily involved with environmental issues. They maintained homes in Marlow, Buckinghamshire, and Ipanema, Rio de Janeiro. The track "Favela Music" on his 1981 album Let The Thunder Cry arose from his love of Brazil, and he worked with several Brazilian composers.

Capaldi was a friend and supporter of the London School of Samba and played with the bateria on at least one occasion. He was active in charitable work for several organisations in Brazil, such as the Associação Beneficiente São Martinho street children's charity in Lapa, Rio de Janeiro, which the LSS also supported between 1994 and 2001. His wife was also the Porta Bandeira (flag bearer) of the LSS in the 1994 and 1995 Notting Hill Carnival parades.

Outside his music and environmental activism, Capaldi also assisted his wife in her work with Jubilee Action to help Brazilian street children. Because of this charity work, Capaldi and his wife were guests of Tony Blair at the Prime Minister's country house, Chequers. He remained professionally active until his final illness prevented him from working on plans for a 2005 reunion tour of Traffic. He died of stomach cancer in Westminster, London, on 28 January 2005, aged 60.

== Tributes ==
Following his death, several tributes in celebration of Capaldi's life and music came out under the name Dear Mr Fantasy. The first was a tribute concert that took place at the Roundhouse in Camden Town, London on Sunday, 21 January 2007. Guests included Bill Wyman (the Rolling Stones), Jon Lord (Deep Purple), Gary Moore (Thin Lizzy), Steve Winwood (Traffic), Cat Stevens (aka Yusuf Islam), Joe Walsh (Eagles), Paul Weller (the Jam), Pete Townshend (the Who), Jim's brother Phil, and many more. The performances were evenly split between Capaldi's solo songs and his work with Traffic. All profits went to The Jubilee Action Street Children Appeal. A recording of the concert was released as a double CD set the same year.

The second such tribute, Dear Mr. Fantasy: The Jim Capaldi Story, is a four-disc boxed set released in July 2011. Though a slight majority of the tracks came from Capaldi's solo albums, it also included some of his work with the Hellions, Deep Feeling, and Traffic, a few rare non-album tracks, and more than ten previously unreleased recordings, including a song co-written with George Harrison in 1997. The box was also packaged with extensive liner notes, compiling a number of photos and essays.

The third and final tribute is a book of Capaldi's handwritten lyrics, released in November 2011. The ideas of a boxed set and lyrics book had been conceived by Capaldi shortly before he died, and their releases were prepared by his widow in fulfilment of a last promise to him.

== Solo discography ==
Jim Capaldi discography
- Studio albums: 13
- Compilation albums: 4
- Singles: 27

=== Studio albums ===
Year	Album details	Chart positions	
Year	Album details	AUS	US
1972	Oh How We Danced	35	82
1974	Whale Meat Again	–	191
1975	Short Cut Draw Blood	95	193
1978	Daughter of the Night	–	–
1978	The Contender	–	–
1979	Electric Nights	–	–
1980	The Sweet Smell of ... Success	–	–
1981	Let the Thunder Cry	–	–
1983	Fierce Heart	–	91
1984	One Man Mission	–	–
1988	Some Come Running	–	183
2001	Living on the Outside	–	–
2004	Poor Boy Blue	–	–

=== Compilation albums ===
- 1995 – Prince of Darkness
- 1999 – Live: The 40,000 Headmen Tour (with Dave Mason)
- 2011 – Dear Mr Fantasy: The Jim Capaldi Story
- 2020 – Open Your Heart – The Island Recordings 1972–1976

=== Singles ===
Year	Title	Chart positions					
Year	Title	AUS	US	US AC	US Rock	UK	CAN
1972	"Eve"	65	91	—	—	55 (Note: Chart position is from the official UK "Breakers List".)	—
1972	"Oh How We Danced"	—	—	—	—	—	—
1973	"Tricky Dicky Rides Again"	—	—	—	—	—	—
1974	"It's All Up to You"	—	110	—	—	27	—
1975	"It's All Right"	—	55	—	—	—	65
1975	"Love Hurts"	6	97	—	—	4	15
1976	"Talkin' Bout My Baby"	—	—	—	—	—	—
1976	"If You Think You Know How to Love Me"	—	—	—	—	—	—
1976	"Good Night & Good Morning"	—	—	42	—	—	—
1977	"Goodbye My Love"	—	—	—	—	—	—
1978	"Daughter of the Night"	—	—	—	—	—	—
1979	"Shoeshine"	—	—	—	—	—	—
1980	"Hold on to Your Love"	—	—	—	—	—	—
1980	"The Low Spark of High Heeled Boys"	—	—	—	—	—	—
1981	"Child in the Storm"	—	—	—	—	—	—
1981	"Old Photographs"	—	—	—	—	—	—
1981	"Favella Music"	—	—	—	—	—	—
1981	"Dreams Do Come True"	—	—	—	—	—	—
1983	"That's Love"	—	28	3	—	—	—
1983	"Tonight You're Mine"	—	—	—	—	—	—
1983	"Living on the Edge"	—	75	—	—	—	—
1984	"I'll Keep Holding On"	—	106	—	58	—	—
1988	"Something So Strong"	126	—	—	4	—	—
1988	"Dancing on the Highway"	—	—	—	—	—	—
1989	"Some Come Running"	—	—	—	—	—	—
1989	"Oh Lord, Why Lord"	—	—	—	—	—	—
2001	"Anna Julia"	—	—	—	—	—	—

('Love Hurts' was also ranked No. 137 in the Canadian Top 200 of 1976)
