= Popular music of Birmingham =

British local popular music

Birmingham's culture of popular music first developed in the mid-1950s. By the early 1960s the city's music scene had emerged as one of the largest and most vibrant in the country; a "seething cauldron of musical activity", with over 500 bands constantly exchanging members and performing regularly across a well-developed network of venues and promoters. By 1963 the city's music was also already becoming recognised for what would become its defining characteristic: the refusal of its musicians to conform to any single style or genre. Birmingham's tradition of combining a highly collaborative culture with an open acceptance of individualism and experimentation dates back as far back as the 18th century, and musically this has expressed itself in the wide variety of music produced within the city, often by closely related groups of musicians, from the "rampant eclecticism" of the Brum beat era, to the city's "infamously fragmented" post-punk scene, to the "astonishing range" of distinctive and radical electronic music produced in the city from the 1980s to the early 21st century.

This diversity and culture of experimentation has made Birmingham a fertile birthplace of new musical styles, many of which have gone on to have a global influence. During the 1960s the Spencer Davis Group combined influences from folk, jazz, blues and soul and to create a wholly new rhythm and blues sound that "stood with any of the gritty hardcore soul music coming out of the American South", while The Move laid the way for the distinctive sound of English psychedelia by "putting everything in pop up to that point in one ultra-eclectic sonic blender". Heavy metal was born in the city in the early 1970s by combining the melodic pop influence of Liverpool, the high volume guitar-based blues sound of London and compositional techniques from Birmingham's own jazz tradition. Bhangra emerged from the Balsall Heath area in the 1960s and 1970s with the addition of western musical influences to traditional Punjabi music. The ska revival grew out of the West Midlands uniquely multi-racial musical culture. Grindcore was born in Sparkbrook from fusing the separate influences of extreme metal and hardcore punk. Techno's Birmingham sound combined the established sound of Detroit techno with the influence of Birmingham's own industrial music and post-punk culture.

== Early rock and roll ==
Interest in rock and roll developed in Birmingham in the mid-1950s, after American recordings such as Bill Haley & His Comets' 1954 singles "Shake, Rattle and Roll" and "Rock Around the Clock"; and Elvis Presley's 1956 singles "Hound Dog" and "Blue Suede Shoes" began to appear on British airwaves.

Many performers who would be influential in the later growth of Birmingham music emerged during this era. Danny King had been receiving American blues and soul recordings by mail order from the United States since 1952, and soon afterwards began to perform covers of songs by artists such as Big Joe Turner in pubs such as The Gunmakers in the Jewellery Quarter. In 1957 he formed Danny King and the Dukes with Clint Warwick, performing rhythm and blues covers in local clubs and cinemas. Tex Detheridge and the Gators began performing Hank Williams covers on Saturday nights at The Mermaid in Sparkhill and on Sundays at the Bilberry Tea Rooms in Rednal in early 1956. The emergence of skiffle as a popular phenomenon in 1956 saw the birth of a new wave of Birmingham bands. The Vikings started as a skiffle group in Nechells in the spring 1957, with Pat Wayne and the Deltas also emerging as a skiffle group in Ladywood around the same time, spending the summer of 1957 busking on pleasure boats on the River Severn in Worcester.

== Brum Beat ==
By the 1960s Birmingham had become the home of a popular music scene comparable to that of Liverpool: despite producing no one band as big as The Beatles the city was a "seething cauldron of musical activity", with several hundred groups whose memberships, names and musical activities were in a constant state of flux. The New Musical Express calculated that in 1964 there were over 500 groups operating within the city. Birmingham was a bigger and more diverse city than Liverpool, however, that was never subject to a single controlling influence such as that exercised by Liverpool's Brian Epstein; and as a result Birmingham's bands never conformed to a single homogenous sound comparable to Liverpool's Merseybeat. Instead the city's music was characterised by a "rampant eclecticism", its style ranging from traditional blues, rock and roll and rhythm and blues through to folk, folk rock, psychedelia and soul, with its influence extending into the 1970s and beyond.

It was in 1963 and 1964 that Birmingham's existing largely underground music scene began to attract national and international attention. The first single to be released commercially by a Birmingham band was "Sugar Baby" by Jimmy Powell and The Dimensions, released by Decca on 23 March 1962. The first Birmingham-based band to have a Top 10 hit were The Applejacks, who signed to Decca in late 1963 and whose debut single "Tell Me When" reached number 7 in the UK Singles Chart in February 1964. The Rockin' Berries made the Top 50 in September 1964 with "I Didn't Mean to Hurt You" and reached number 3 in October with "He's in Town", both songs featuring the distinctive falsetto vocals of Geoff Turton. The Fortunes had their 1964 recording "Caroline" adopted as its theme song by the pirate radio station Radio Caroline, and followed this with three major international hits in 1965 – "You've Got Your Troubles", a top 10 hit in both the UK and the US, "Here It Comes Again" and "This Golden Ring". The Uglys achieved a sizeable Australian hit, "Wake Up My Mind," in 1965. The Ivy League, founded by the Small Heath-born songwriting partnership of John Carter and Ken Lewis, had three UK hits in 1965: "Funny How Love Can Be", "That's Why I'm Crying" and "Tossing And Turning".

In early 1964, Dial Records and Decca both released compilation albums showcasing the breadth of the Birmingham music scene. The sleeve notes to the Decca compilation emphasised that Birmingham's characteristic musical diversity was already becoming clear: "But is there a Brum sound? This album surely proves beyond doubt that the answer is no. The reason: all the city's groups, including those heard on this LP, are striving to achieve some degree of individuality."

The most consistently successful Birmingham group of this era was The Spencer Davis Group, which fused its members' varied backgrounds in folk, blues, jazz and soul into a wholly new rhythm and blues sound that "stood with any of the gritty hardcore soul music coming out of the American South". Driven by the "astoundingly soulful" vocals of the young Steve Winwood, accompanied by his own searing keyboard style, the pounding bass riffs of his brother Muff Winwood, the jazz-influenced drumming of Pete York and the then-unique electric fuzz guitar effect of Spencer Davis, the band started off playing R&B covers but achieved their greatest success with their own compositions. Chris Blackwell of Island Records signed the band on the spot after hearing them at the Golden Eagle pub on Hill Street in April 1964, and after four minor hits in late 1964 and early 1965 they broke through with their late 1965 single "Keep on Running", which knocked The Beatles off the number 1 position in the UK in January 1966. Two more UK hit singles followed during 1966 alongside two highly successful albums, before the November 1966 release of their own composition "Gimme Some Loving" – the group's masterpiece and one of the great recordings of the 1960s. This and its 1967 Winwood-written follow up "I'm a Man" were top 10 hits on both sides of the Atlantic selling over a million copies and adding a huge fanbase in America to their existing European popularity.

The Moody Blues were also originally primarily an R&B band, formed in May 1964 with musicians from other Birmingham bands including El Riot & the Rebels, Denny and the Diplomats, Danny King and the Dukes and Gerry Levene and the Avengers. By November they had secured a major international hit with their multi-million selling single "Go Now", which reached number 1 in the UK and number 10 in the US, and whose "soulful, agonized" vocal performance established lead singer Denny Laine as one of the most recognisable voices in British music. Although at this stage still within the R&B tradition, the music of the early Moody Blues already showed signs of the more experimental approach that would characterise their later career, with highly original musical compositions by Laine and Mike Pinder; live four-part harmonies that were far more expansive than anything used by bands such as The Beatles, The Rolling Stones, The Hollies or The Dave Clark Five at the time; and the zen-like repetition and rhythmic complexity of their piano parts prefiguring their future psychedelic style.

The television programme Thank Your Lucky Stars, broadcast by ABC Weekend TV from its studios in Aston between 1961 and 1966, was a major showcase for British pop music of the period, hosting the network television debut of The Beatles on 13 January 1963. The show was best known for its catchphrase "Oi'll give it foive!", which entered nationwide consciousness as sixteen-year-old West Bromwich-born Janice Nicholls gave her verdict on the week's singles in Spin-a-Disc in her broad Black Country accent.

== Folk revival ==
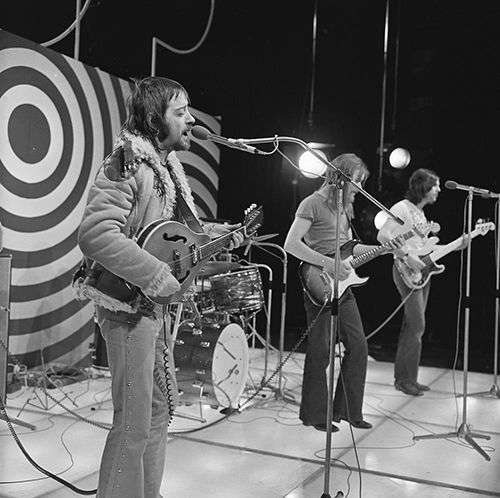
Dave Swarbrick and Dave Pegg performing with Fairport Convention in 1972

Research by folk music scholars recorded a rich tradition of folk-songs from the West Midlands as late as the 1960s, including songs being performed by local traditional singers such as Cecilia Costello and George Dunn entirely within an oral tradition, and songs documented by other folk music collectors over the previous 70 years. These included songs of social protest and songs of everyday life referring to places in and around the city, and reflected the area's underlying native rural traditions, its industrial culture and the influence of successive waves of incomers bringing and assimilating musical traditions from elsewhere.

Ian Campbell, who moved to Birmingham from Aberdeen as a teenager, was one of the most important figures of the British folk revival during the early 1960s. During the 1950s he fell under the influence of the Marxist Birmingham writer George Thomson and in 1956 founded the Ian Campbell Folk Group, initially as a skiffle group, but from 1958 performing politically charged folk songs including Fenian and Jacobite songs, and songs of miners, industrial workers and farmworkers. The group's 1962 record Ceilidh at the Crown was the first live folk club recording ever to be released, and in 1965 they were the first group outside the United States to record a Bob Dylan song, when their cover of "The Times They Are a-Changin'" reached the UK top 50. Campbell also ran the Jug o' Punch Folk Song Club, originally at The Crown in Station Street, but later at the Digbeth Civic Hall on Thursday nights. This was arguably the most important folk club in the United Kingdom during the 1960s, and certainly the largest, attracting an audience that regularly reached 500 people a week. Other notable Birmingham folk clubs during the mid-1960s included the Eagle Folk Club at the Golden Eagle on Hill Street and the Skillet Pot Club above the Old Contemptibles on Livery Street.

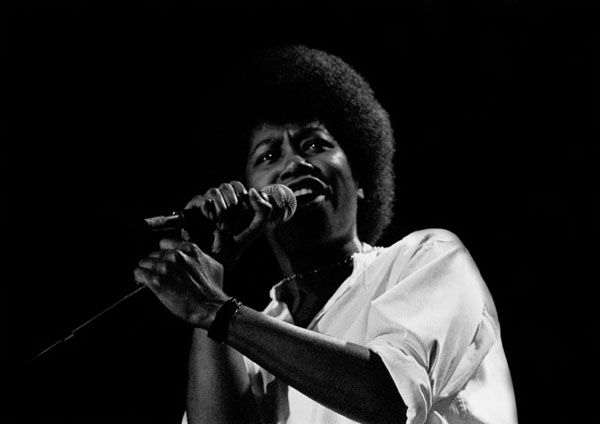
Joan Armatrading

Two Birmingham musicians from the Ian Campbell Folk Group would become key exponents in the development of folk rock over the next decade through their involvement with the band Fairport Convention, which had formed in London in 1967. The fiddler Dave Swarbrick joined the band in 1969, his knowledge of traditional music becoming the biggest single influence on the following album Liege & Lief, generally considered the most important album both of Fairport Convention as a band and of the folk rock genre as a whole. Swarbrick's former colleague from the Ian Campbell Folk Group Dave Pegg joined as the bass player later in 1969, and by 1972 the two Birmingham musicians were the band's only remaining members, holding the group together over the following years of rapid personnel change.

Singer-songwriter Joan Armatrading was the first British woman to have significant commercial success in the field of folk music and the first Black British woman to enjoy international success in any musical genre. Born on the Caribbean island of Saint Kitts, she was brought up from the age of 7 in the Brookfields area of Handsworth. In 1972 she released her debut album Whatever's for Us and recorded the first of her eight Peel Sessions, but her commercial breakthrough in Britain was 1976's Joan Armatrading, which reached the top 20 and which included top 10 hit "Love and Affection".

Of all of the folk musicians from the Birmingham area, the one with the greatest long-term influence was Nick Drake. He grew up from 1952 in the commuter village of Tanworth-in-Arden, five miles outside the city's boundaries in Warwickshire. His father was the chairman and managing director of Wolseley Engineering in Birmingham's Adderley Park. Drake completed his education at a tutorial college in Birmingham's Five Ways, from where he won a scholarship to study English literature at Cambridge. Having had a musical childhood, with a mother who wrote songs and performed them on the piano, at Cambridge Drake began to write and perform his own compositions. In 1968 he was discovered by Joe Boyd, who signed a contract with him as his manager, agent, publisher and producer, later recalling "The clarity and strength of his talent were striking ... his guitar technique was so clean it took a while to realize how complex it was. Influences were detectable here and there, but the heart of the music was mysteriously original". Over the following two years Drake recorded and released two albums – Five Leaves Left and Bryter Layter – of understated but harmonically complex songs that owed as much to jazz as to folk traditions, but which sold poorly, partly due to his acute shyness and increasing reluctance to perform live. Drake slipped into a period of introversion and depression, returning to his parents’ home in Tanworth, from where he was to record his bleak final album Pink Moon. On 25 November 1974 he died in his sleep in Tanworth from an overdose of Amitriptyline, an antidepressant, with the only media coverage being a personal announcement in the Birmingham Post three days later.

Virtually unknown at his death, Drake has since become one of the greatest examples of an artist achieving posthumous fame and influence. The journalist Ian MacDonald wrote how "During the eighties I drifted away from the music scene. When I returned, I was surprised to find that Nick Drake was becoming famous. Like most of those (make that all of those) who'd known him in whatever way, I'd got used to thinking of him as a private thing, an artist relegated to the exclusive periphery, one for the connoisseur." By the 1980s Drake's work had gained a cult audience, which grew throughout the 1990s and by the 2000s has reached a point of widespread fame. With an influence extending from alternative rock to free jazz, and including figures as diverse as R.E.M., Radiohead, David Gray and Beth Orton, the actors Brad Pitt and Heath Ledger and the film director Sam Mendes, his work is now revered as one of the greatest achievements both of British folk music and of the entire singer-songwriter genre worldwide.

== Psychedelia and progressive rock ==
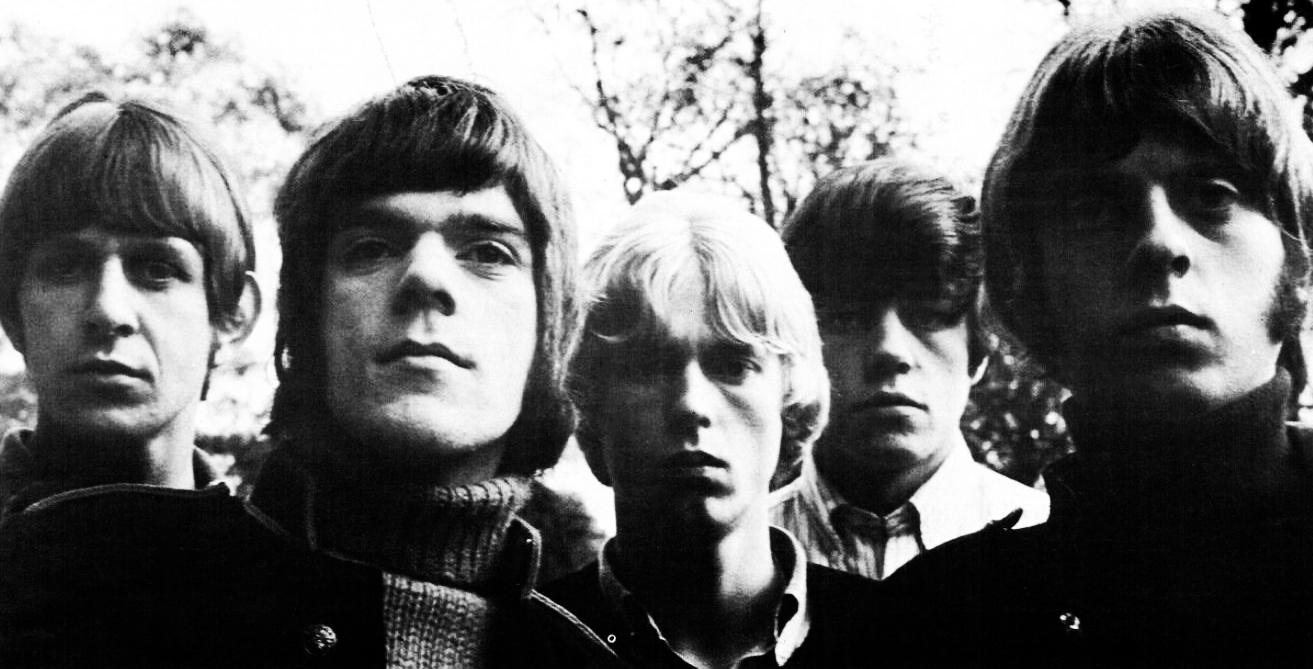
The Move in 1967

In the late 1960s the extreme eclecticism of Birmingham's musical culture saw the emergence of several highly original bands who would each develop new and distinctive pop sonorities, between them establishing many of the archetypes of the psychedelia and progressive rock that would follow. The first of these was The Move, formed in December 1965 by musicians from several existing Birmingham bands including Mike Sheridan and The Nightriders, Carl Wayne and The Vikings and the Mayfair Set; initially performing covers of American West Coast acts such as The Byrds alongside Motown and early rock 'n' roll classics. Guitarist Roy Wood was soon persuaded to start writing original material, and his eccentric, melodically inventive songwriting and dark, ironic sense of humour saw their first five singles all reach the UK Top 5. With their sound "placing everything in pop to date in one ultra-eclectic sonic blender", The Move performed across an enormous range of styles, including blues, 1950s rock 'n' roll and country and western with a particularly strong influence from hard-edged rhythmic soul, and with some of their material approaching the sound that would later be identified as heavy metal. Their 1966 single "I Can Hear the Grass Grow" has been credited, alongside near-simultaneous releases by The Beatles and Pink Floyd, with establishing the childlike pastoral vision that would characterise English psychedelia, though Wood's songs were in not in fact LSD-influenced but based on a set of "fairy stories for adults" he had written while still at school, and were intended as "songs about going mad, or just being a bit bonkers". The Move were notorious for their highly confrontational live act, smashing up televisions and setting off fireworks on stage, and for a period featuring a life-sized effigy of Prime Minister Harold Wilson which was torn to shreds over the course of the show.

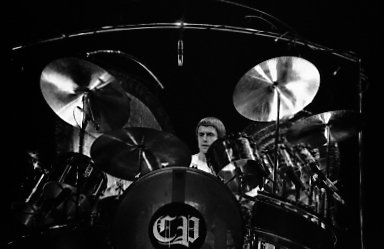
Carl Palmer performing as part of Emerson, Lake & Palmer

In 1966 The Craig released "I Must be Mad", a furiously energetic freakbeat-influenced single that showcased the sophistication of Handsworth-born Carl Palmer's unpredictable and angular drumming. This record has since come to be recognised as one of the earliest examples of British psychedelia, being voted by The Observer second only to Pink Floyd's "Arnold Layne" as the best psychedelic single of the 1960s. The Craig dissolved later that year, but Palmer was to become the leading drummer of the progressive rock era worldwide as a member of groups including The Crazy World of Arthur Brown, Atomic Rooster and the supergroups Emerson, Lake and Palmer and Asia; developing a drumming style of a speed, dexterity and complexity that completely transcended the more traditional rock drumming of artists like Keith Moon, John Bonham or Charlie Watts. Also performing in the style later identified as freakbeat were The Idle Race, the most important Birmingham band of the 1960s not to achieve significant commercial success, who formed from the remains of The Nightriders in 1966, after the departure of Roy Wood and Mike Sheridan led to their replacement by a 19-year-old Jeff Lynne. By 1967 Lynne was clearly the band's leader, shaping its sound and direction and writing its original material. Their 1968 debut album The Birthday Party gained critical recommendations from musical figures as diverse as The Beatles, Marc Bolan, Kenny Everett and John Peel, but little commercial success, being too ambitious to gain mass popularity. When their more accessible 1969 follow-up Idle Race also failed to reach the charts Lynne left to join The Move.

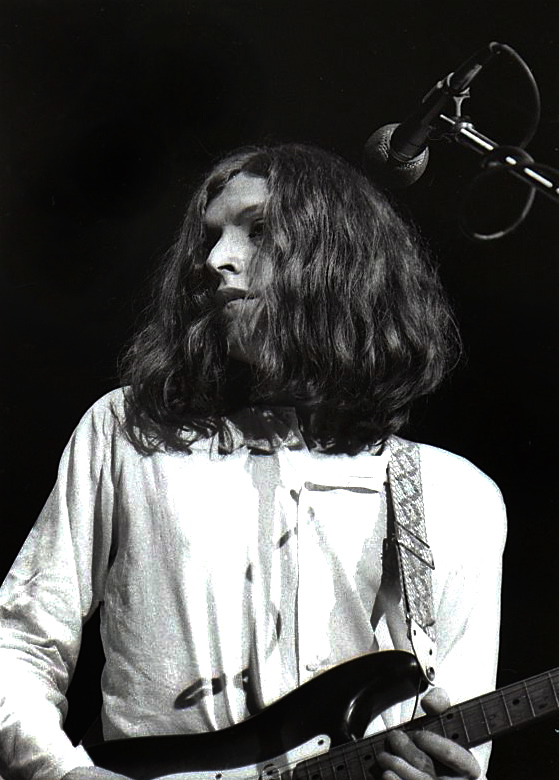
Steve Winwood performing with Traffic

Traffic introduced musical textures and layers previously unknown to rock through their multi-instrumental line-up and their incorporation of jazz, folk and Indian influences, becoming one of the most successful bands of the early seventies internationally, with four US Top 10 albums. The band was formed at The Elbow Room in Aston in April 1967 when Steve Winwood decided to quit The Spencer Davis Group at the height of their success to pursue more adventurous musical directions, joining together with guitarist Dave Mason and drummer Jim Capaldi from The Hellions and flautist and saxophonist Chris Wood from Locomotive. Their first two singles "Paper Sun" and "Hole in My Shoe" highlighted the groups instrumental virtuosity and reached the UK Top 5.

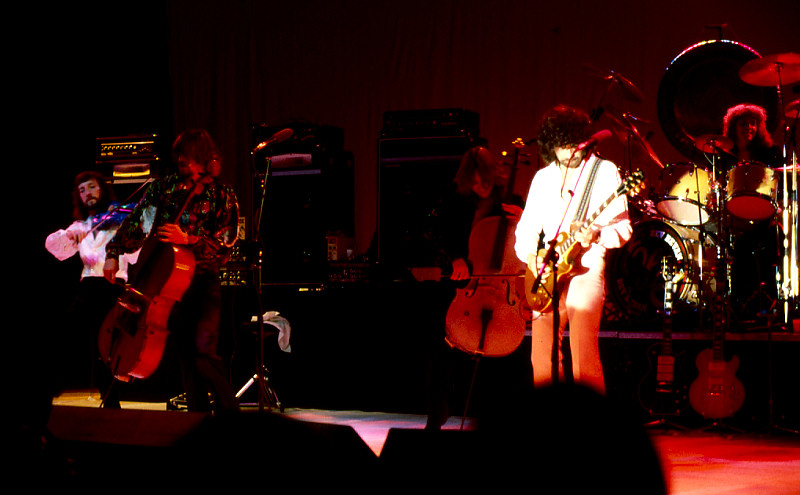
The Electric Light Orchestra in 1978.

Also in the late 1960s, there were psychedelic rock bands, such as Velvett Fogg a cult British psychedelic rock band. Tony Iommi was a member in mid-1968, but soon left to form Black Sabbath. Their lone eponymous album was released in January 1969, and re-released on CD by Sanctuary Records in 2002. Also Bachdenkel, who Rolling Stone called "Britain's Greatest Unknown Group".

In the 1970s members of The Move and The Uglys formed the Electric Light Orchestra and Wizzard.

Birmingham-based tape recorder company, Bradmatic Ltd helped develop and manufacture the Mellotron. Over the next 15 years, the Mellotron had a major impact on rock music and is a trademark sound of the progressive rock bands. Mike Pinder of the Moody Blues worked for that company and it is one of the reasons why he introduced that instrument in the band, giving its very typical sound.

== Early heavy metal ==
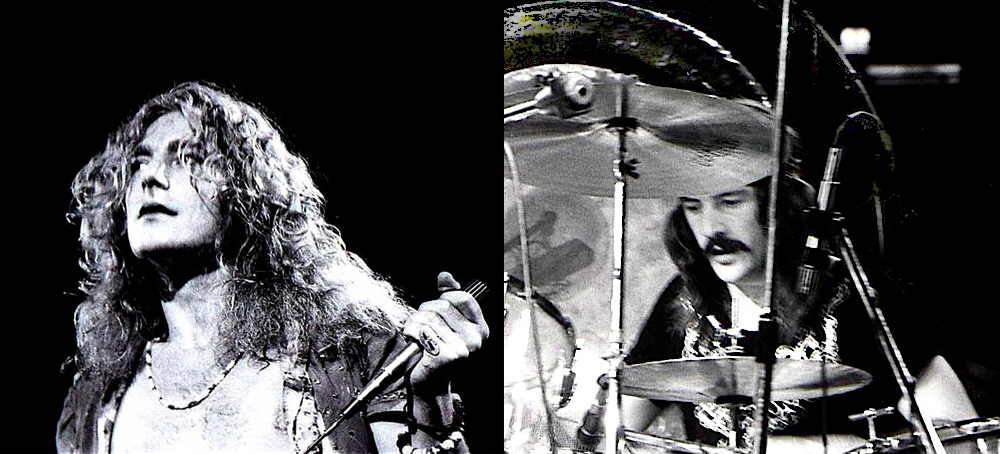
Robert Plant and John Bonham, who joined Led Zeppelin from the Birmingham-based Band of Joy

Birmingham in the late 1960s and early 1970s was the birthplace of heavy metal music, whose international success as a musical genre over subsequent decades has been rivalled only by hip-hop in the size of its global following, and which bears many hallmarks of its Birmingham origins. The city's location in the centre of England meant that its music scene was influenced both by the London-based British blues Revival and by the melodic pop songwriting of Liverpool, allowing it to apply Liverpool's harmonically inventive approach to London's high-volume guitar-dominated style, in the process moving beyond the conventions of both. Birmingham's local jazz tradition was to influence heavy metal's characteristic use of modal composition, and the dark sense of irony characteristic of the city's culture was to influence the genre's typical b-movie horror film lyrical style and its defiantly outsider stance. The industrial basis of Birmingham society in the 1960s and 1970s was also significant: early heavy metal artists described the mechanical monotony of industrial life, the bleakness of the post-war urban environment and the pulsating sound of factory machinery as influences on the sound they developed, and Black Sabbath's use of loosely stringed down-tuned guitars and power chords partly resulted from lead guitarist Tony Iommi's loss of the ends of two fingers on his right hand in an industrial accident with a sheet metal cutting machine. The style of music also had precedents among earlier local bands: aggressive performing styles had been a characteristic of the wild and destructive stage shows of The Move, and Chicken Shack's pioneering use of high volume Marshall Stacks had pushed the boundaries of loud and aggressive blues to new extremes.

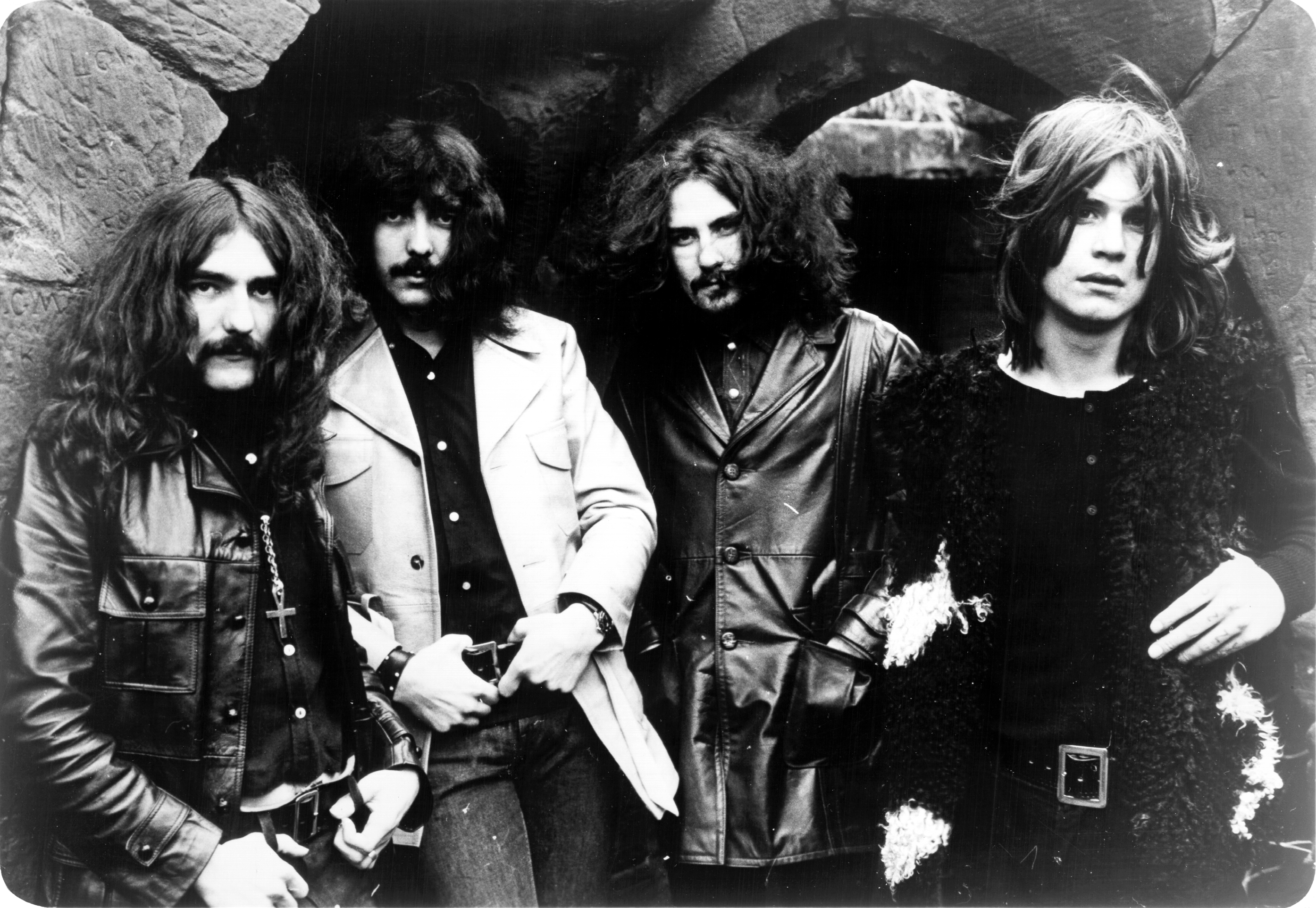
Black Sabbath

Critics disagree over which band can be thought of as the first true heavy metal band, with American commentators tending to favour Led Zeppelin and British commentators tending to favour Black Sabbath. Led Zeppelin formed in 1968 and was made up of two London-based musicians, one of whom was in The Yardbirds, and two from the Birmingham-based Band of Joy, marking an explicit combination of the musical influences of the two cities. The Yardbirds had extended the instrumental textures of the blues through extended jamming sessions, but it was the influence of the Midlands-based musicians – drummer John Bonham and vocalist Robert Plant – that would provide Led Zeppelin's harder edge and focus, and bring a more eclectic range of stylistic influences. While it remained based in blues and rock and roll conventions, the music of Led Zeppelin blended these with extreme volume and a highly experimental melodic and rhythmic approach, forging a much harder and heavier sound. This combination of intensity and finesse in Led Zeppelin's output redefined both mainstream and alternative rock music for the 1970s, particularly in the United States, where they remain the fourth-best-selling act in music history.

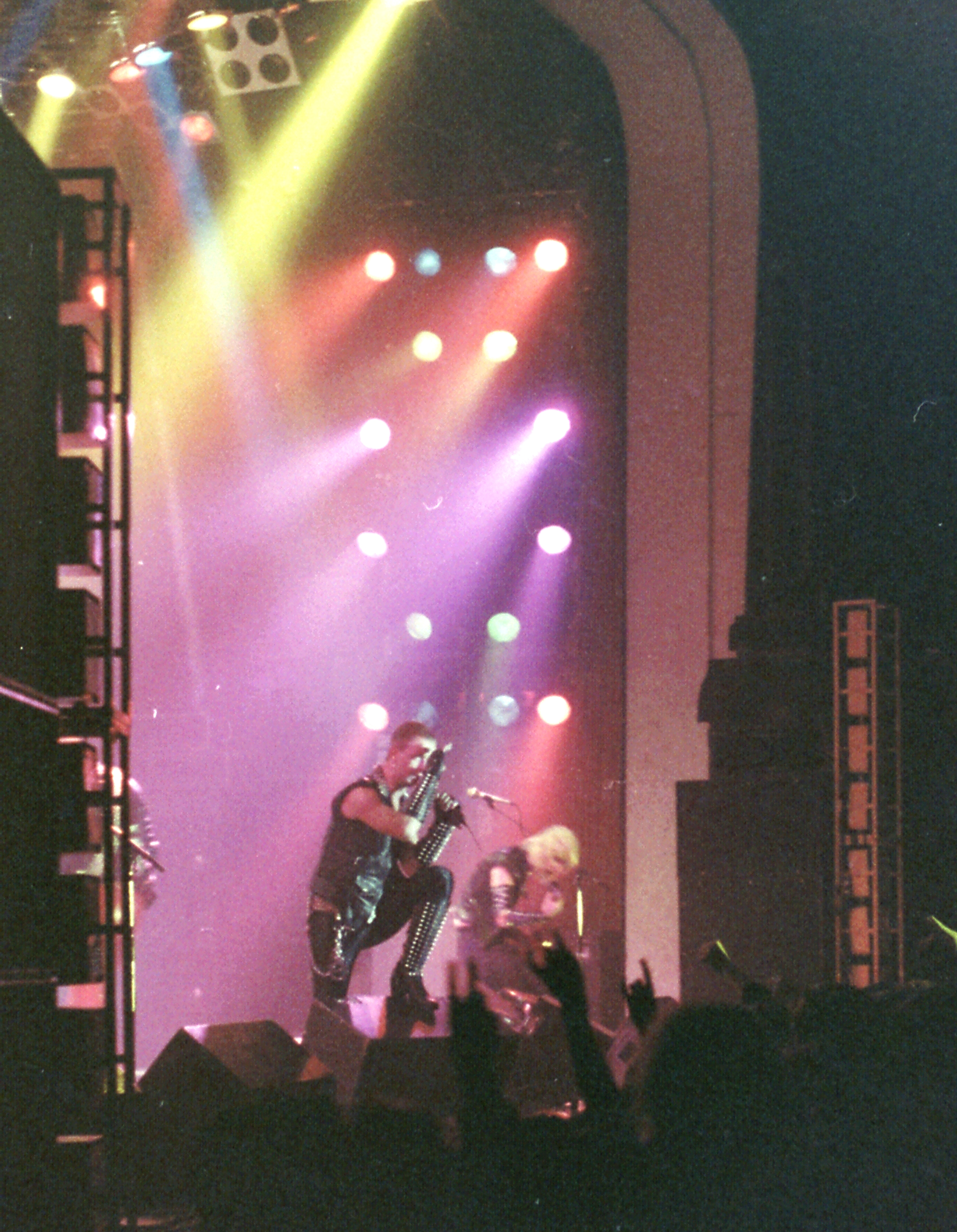
Judas Priest in 1981.

More radical in their departure from established musical conventions were Black Sabbath, whose origins lay as a band playing blues and rock and roll covers within the mainstream Birmingham music scene of the 1960s. From 1969 onwards they moved away from the traditional structures of rock and roll music entirely, using modal rather than three-chord blues forms and creating an entirely new set of musical codes based on multi-sectional design, unresolved tritones and Aeolian riffs. Their 1970 album Black Sabbath first saw the pattern of angular riffs, power chords, down-tuned guitars and crushingly high volume that would come to characterise heavy metal. Paranoid, their second album, refined and focused this model, and in the process "defined the sound and style of heavy metal more than any other album in rock history". Paranoid also marked Black Sabbath's commercial breakthrough, reaching number 1 in the UK album charts and number 8 in the US. Black Sabbath's influence is universal throughout heavy metal and its many subgenres, but their musical significance extends well beyond metal: their discovery that guitar-based music could be fundamentally alienating would lead directly to the sound of the Sex Pistols and the birth of punk; and their influence would be felt by bands as diverse as the post-punk Joy Division, the avant-garde Sonic Youth, the Seattle-based grunge bands Nirvana, Mudhoney, Soundgarden and Alice in Chains, Californian stoner rock, and even the rap of Ice-T, Cypress Hill and Eminem.

Also crucial to the emergence of heavy metal as an international phenomenon were Judas Priest, who moved beyond the early sound of the metal genre in the later 1970s, combining the doom-laden gothic feel of Black Sabbath with the fast, riff-based sound of Led Zeppelin, while adding their own distinctive two-guitar cutting edge. Their 1978 album Stained Class established the sonic template for the new wave of British heavy metal that would follow, removing the last traces of blues rock from the metal sound and taking it to new levels of power, speed, malevolence and musicality. By 1979 and the release of Killing Machine and the live album Unleashed in the East they had effectively redefined the whole genre, and with their 1980 album British Steel they brought the new sound decisively into the commercial mainstream. Judas Priest came to epitomise heavy metal more than any other band, with the look of motorbikes, leather, studs and spikes adopted by lead singer Rob Halford coming to define heavy metal's visual style. They were to form the essential link between the traditional heavy metal of the 1970s and the various genres of extreme metal that would follow, their sound laying the basis for the speed metal, death metal, thrash metal and black metal of the 1980s.

== Ska and reggae ==
Birmingham's booming post-war economy made it the main area alongside London for the settlement of West Indian immigrants from 1948 and throughout the 1950s. With black music and black audiences often excluded from mainstream clubs in Birmingham City Centre the 1960s and 1970s saw a distinctive West Indian culture of blues parties emerge in Birmingham districts such as Handsworth and Balsall Heath as the urban equivalent of the all-night communal "tea parties" of rural Jamaica. Blues parties were unlicensed gatherings usually held in empty private houses, where visitors paid on the door and electricity was often wired in from outside street lighting. Early Birmingham blues played calypso and rhythm and blues, but the early 1960s saw the rise of ska and from the late 1960s the scene was dominated by dub. Music would be provided by mobile sound systems, who would try to stand out from their competitors through the strength of the bass produced by their equipment; and by DJs toasting over the newest and most obscure dubplates, often going to great lengths to disguise the source of their records.

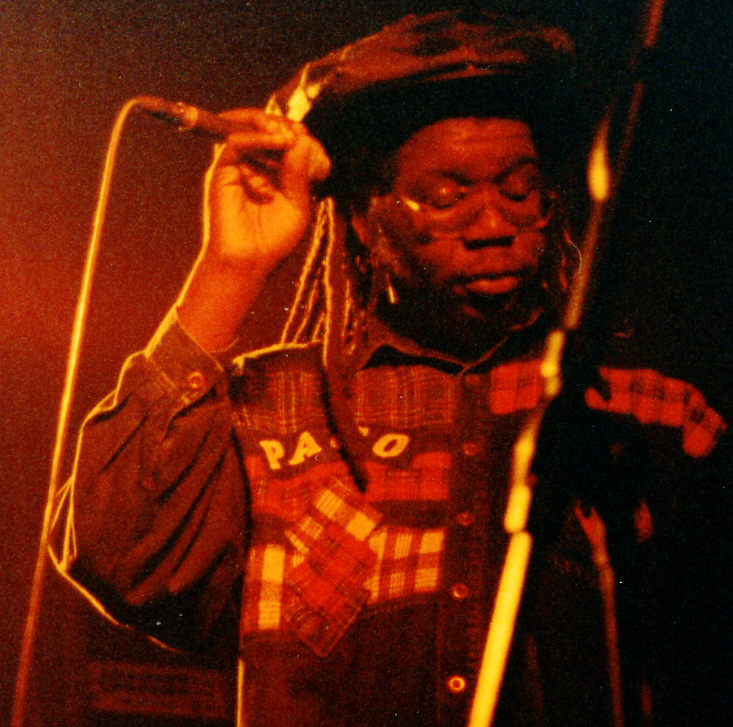
Toaster Macka B

Publicity for blues parties was largely through word of mouth or over pirate radio stations and generally did not include precise details of addresses or locations, so sound systems attracted loyal but highly localised followings. Sounds would also often "play out" in neighbouring areas or challenge other sound systems in a competitive sound clash, allowing the more prominent outfits to attract wider attention – during the 1970s and 1980s the better-known Handsworth sounds would attract visitors from as far afield as London, Manchester and Bristol. Notable Birmingham sound systems whose reputations extended beyond the city included Quaker City, which was founded in 1965; Duke Alloy, which was founded in 1966 and featured the toaster Astro who later became part of UB40; and Wassifa, which featured Macka B, the most influential British toaster of the 1980s. The founders of the reggae band Eclipse, who met at a blues party, later recalled "Blues would took place everywhere. You only had to go out in Lozells or down the Soho Rd, there was loads going on, you could stand and listen to the music coming out of the houses, pubs and clubs."

During the 1960s and 1970s, the West Midlands developed a culture of Black British music that was unique, remaining far less segregated from the white music scene than was the case in London. White and black musicians could routinely be seen jamming together in pubs in districts such as Handsworth and Balsall Heath and, as the cultural commentator Dick Hebdige observed, Birmingham was "one of the few places left in Britain where it's still possible for a white man to get into a shebeen without wearing a blue uniform and kicking the door down". The result was a free exchange of influence and support between the sound systems of the city's Jamaican-influenced musical culture and local bands of all races and genres, with particularly close relationships growing between the city's reggae and punk scenes. A close-knit core community of musicians emerged, combining varied musical influences with a commitment to a common goal. Birmingham bands were showing the influence of Jamaican music as early as 1968, when Locomotive had a minor UK hit with the ska single "Rudi's in Love", and, by 1969, ska nights at Birmingham City Centre clubs were attracting early skinheads dressed in tonic suits and loafers,

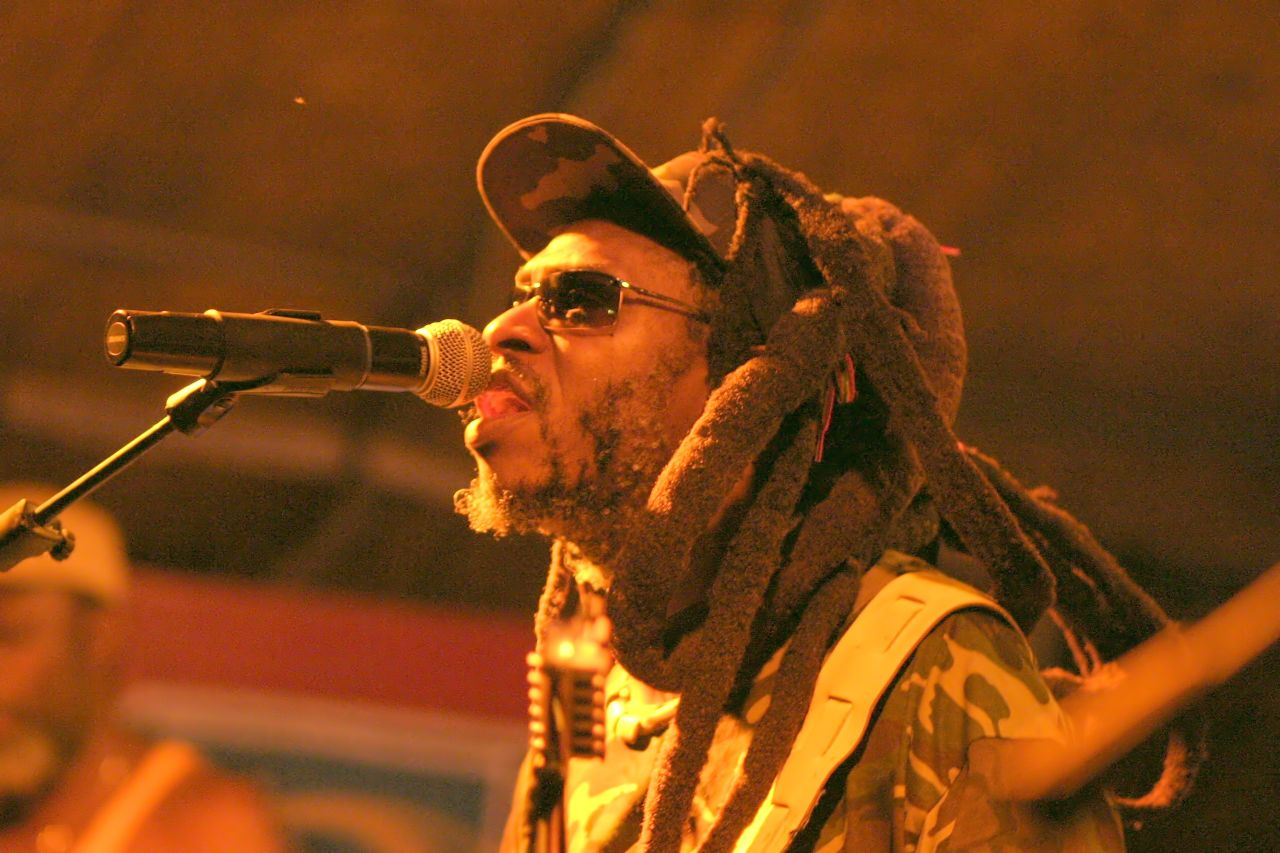
David Hinds of Steel Pulse

Birmingham's first major home-grown reggae band was Steel Pulse, who formed in Handsworth Wood in 1975 from a group of musicians who had been playing dub plates since the age of 15 and 16. One of Britain's greatest reggae bands in terms of both critical and commercial success, and one of very few bands from outside the island to have a significant impact on reggae within Jamaica itself, Steel Pulse were also the most militant of Britain's reggae bands of the 1970s with a reputation for uncompromising political ferocity. During their early years their music carried distinct jazz and Latin influences, but during the 1980s they brought in synthesisers and touches of R&B, later returning to a rootsier sound that showed that reflected the growth of dancehall and hip-hop. Their 1978 debut album Handsworth Revolution stood out from its peers in its political commitment and is still considered one of the landmark releases of British reggae.

The reggae subgenre lovers rock, would often be heard at blues parties during the 1970s and 1980s. The emotive Lovers rock song "Men Cry Too" by Beshara, is still considered to be one of the biggest and most popular songs within the subgenre. Later, Musical Youth, UB40 (the first truly mixed-race UK dub band), and Pato Banton found commercial success. AllMusic described UB40's edgy, unique take on reggae that combined British and Jamaican influences as "revolutionary, their sound unlike anything else on either island".

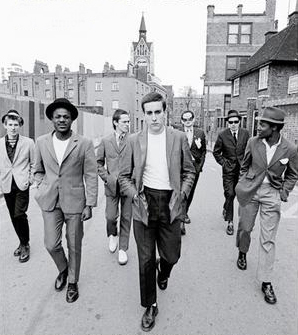
The Specials, from nearby Coventry, rose to prominence on the Birmingham music scene in 1978.

In the late 1970s, under the influence of punk rock, the casually multi-ethnic ska culture emerged into a coherent movement called 2 Tone, which featured politically charged lyrics, multi-racial bands, and musical influences including Jamaican ska, bluebeat, reggae northern soul and white English music hall. At the forefront of this development were The Specials, who were formed and based in nearby Coventry, but who came to prominence on the Birmingham music scene in 1978, holding a weekly residency at the Golden Eagle pub on Hill Street and playing as a support act for visiting punk acts playing in Birmingham. The Specials first attracted wider attention after standing in for The Clash at Barbarella's on Cumberland Street, and in 1979 established their own 2 Tone Records label to record their first single, "Gangsters", which quickly became an underground hit and started a run of seven consecutive top 10 hits culminating in 1981's "Ghost Town". With its eerie wailing noises, stabbing brass, doom-laden middle eastern musical motifs and dub-style breaks laid over a loping reggae beat, "Ghost Town" marked the birth of the tradition of sinister-sounding British pop that would later lead to the rise of trip hop and dubstep. More significant still were the song's lyrics: the day before "Ghost Town" reached number 1, Britain's inner cities erupted in rioting, and the song's despairing portrait of the collapse of Britain's cities come to symbolise the era, with its nihilistic line "can't go on no more ... the people getting angry" seeming retrospectively prophetic.

Even more eclectic in their influences were Handsworth's The Beat, who formed in 1978 with the intention of mixing punk's "high energy" with the "fluid movement" of dub, but whose sound also included influences from jazz, West African and Afro-Cuban music as well as rock, ska and reggae, creating an atmosphere of jittery tension and paranoia that aligned it more closely to post-punk. Like The Specials, the members of The Beat had varied backgrounds: Dave Wakeling, David Steele and Andy Cox had originally formed a punk band; St. Kitts-born drummer Everett Morton had a background in reggae and had drummed for Joan Armatrading, vocalist Ranking Roger had played drums with a Birmingham punk band as well as toasting over Birmingham sound systems. Saxophonist Saxa was a 60-year-old Jamaican who had played with first-wave ska artists such as Prince Buster and Desmond Dekker and who was recruited to the band after being discovered playing jazz in a Handsworth pub.

== Punk rock ==
Birmingham's earliest punk rock bands preceded the late 1976 emergence of the Sex Pistols and mainstream British punk, instead being influenced directly by the proto-punk of British glam-rock, American garage rock and German krautrock. The earliest were the Swell Maps, formed in 1972 by brothers Epic Soundtracks and Nikki Sudden, inspired by T. Rex, The Stooges and Can. The group produced hours of home recordings on reel-to-reel tapes over the course of the early and mid 1970s with Sudden later recalling that when he first saw the Sex Pistols in April 1976 "my reaction was that they sounded the same as what we were doing". Swell Maps "took punk's no-rules, do-it-yourself, destruction-of-rock promises literally" and "proceeded to create some of the most challenging, foreign, distinctive, and truly rebellious music of recent decades". Although never more than a cult success, they were to be highly influential in the emergence of the next generation of alternative rock, with Dinosaur Jr., R.E.M. and Pavement all citing the group as an influence, and Sonic Youth's Thurston Moore writing that "The Swell Maps had a lot to do with my upbringing".

Misspent Youth (band) formed in 1975, influenced of the New York Dolls and The Stooges but remaining heavily indebted to glam-rock. Although only loosely connected with punk they were considered to be Birmingham's finest live band of the era and built a strong local following, becoming the subject of a legendary epidemic of graffiti throughout the city and surrounding area and regularly selling out Friday nights at the city's leading punk venue Barbarella's by the end of 1978. Despite releasing a single in 1979 and appearing on BBC Television in 1980 they attracted little attention beyond the city and broke up a year later, but in carrying the influence of glam through the punk era they would influence Martin Degville, Boy George, Duran Duran and the birth of Birmingham's New Romantic scene.

The Midlands' most important early punks were The Prefects, considered by DJ John Peel to be better than either The Clash or the Sex Pistols. The group's earliest origins lay in Hednesford to the north of the city, where a group of musicians including Robert Lloyd, P. J. Royston, Graham Blunt and Joe Crow formed in 1975 influenced by the New York Dolls and Neu!, originally calling themselves the Church of England, later The Gestapo and finally – on the suggestion of Royston – The Prefects. Lloyd met Harborne's Apperley brothers at a Patti Smith concert in Birmingham in October 1976, later joining their band and bringing the name and several members from his previous band with him. The new band's first public gig in 1976 ended in a riot when they performed their first song "Birmingham's a Shithole", but by May 1977 they were opening The Clash's "White riot" tour at London's Rainbow Theatre, perfecting a "shambling, improvisational" repertoire that included the 10-second "I've got VD", a highly original interpretation of "Bohemian Rhapsody", and their most well-regarded track, the 10-minute "The Bristol Road leads to Dachau", an early example of the art-punk that would later emerge in the 1980s. The Prefects had no interest in making records, their sole recorded output being a single released after they had split up, and two Peel Sessions eventually released in 2004 as the compilation album The Prefects are Amateur Wankers. Distancing themselves form the wider punk movement – claiming "Bands like The Fall and Subway Sect are all dead serious... and we're a laugh" – their "incredibly prescient and self-effacing sense of humor" saw them "satirize the commodification of punk with clarity, precision, and humor long before anyone else had even realized the limitations of the so-called movement." Describing the "legendary Birmingham group" the journalist Jon Savage later wrote "The Prefects were always one of the most hermetic and confrontational groups. They spared no one, least of all the public."

The release of the Sex Pistols' first single "Anarchy in the UK" in October 1976 led to a wave of punk bands in Birmingham as in the rest of the country. The Accused released a single EP in 1979, their self-deprecating style illustrated by their two most popular songs: the self-explanatory "We're Crap", and "W.M.P.T.E." – a tribute to the West Midlands Passenger Transport Executive. A review of The Sussed in 1978 called them "a shambles", concluding "every town should have one band like The Sussed. Any town with two is in dead trouble" Dansette Damage were best known for their classic debut single, the "double b side" "N.M.E."/"The Only Sound", that became a favourite of John Peel and his producer John Walters and was later learned to have been produced by Robert Plant. The all-male Dangerous Girls started in 1978 with a post-punk sound influenced by Public Image Ltd, perversely moving in an increasingly punk direction for their series of singles, that were re-released on three compilation albums in 2001 and 2002. Of wider long term significance were The Killjoys, who were led by future Dexys Midnight Runners singer Kevin Rowland and grew out of an earlier band called Lucy and the Lovers in 1976. The success of their wild and snarling first single "Johnny won't go to Heaven" in 1977 saw the NME declare Rowland to be Johnny Rotten's successor as the voice of punk protest, but Rowland was already expressing dissatisfaction with punk's uniformity, complaining that "The original idea of punk was to be different and say what you wanted ... not just to copy everybody else". By 1978, in an early sign of the uncompromising eccentricity of Rowland's later career, the Killjoys were inspiring the hatred of punk audiences by performing Bobby Darin covers and country and western music at punk venues like London's 100 Club.

Birmingham's Charged GBH were, alongside Stoke-on-Trent's Discharge and Edinburgh's The Exploited, one of the three dominant bands of the second wave of British punk, which emerged at the start of the 1980s and "took it from the art schools and into the council estates", reacting against the perceived commercialisation of earlier punk to produce music that was "brutal, fast and very aggressive". G. B. H.'s influence helped codify the raw sound that would become known as street punk, becoming a prime influence on the mid-1980s emergence of the thrash metal bands Metallica and Slayer.

== Post-punk ==
During the late 1970s and early 1980s Birmingham was the home of a "vibrant but infamously fragmented and undervalued" post-punk scene. While other English cities produced identifiable scenes with unified sounds, such as the synth-pop pioneers of Sheffield or the sombre post-punk of Manchester, Birmingham produced a far more varied range of music that while often successful, influential and highly original, showed few signs of forming a single cohesive movement.

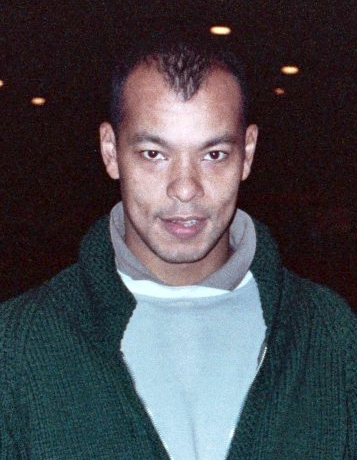
Roland Gift of Fine Young Cannibals

Refusing to conform to a conventional post-punk sound, Pigbag were formed in 1980 by Birmingham musicians Chris Hamlin and Roger Freeman while both were students in Cheltenham. Their first album Dr Heckle & Mr Jive was a highly avant-garde work that mixed punk, free jazz, funk, soul and ska, reaching levels of musical experimentalism comparable to Ligeti, AMM or Steve Reich, but deliberately undermining its seriousness with self-deprecating humour and jocular, punning titles. Despite being a challenging free jazz instrumental, their 1982 single "Papa's Got a Brand New Pigbag" was a major mainstream hit, reaching number 3 in the UK Singles Chart after it was championed by John Peel. Ex-punks Terry & Gerry also stood outside the post-punk mainstream, marrying witty and highly political lyrics to a stripped-down skiffle-revival sound between 1984 and 1986, briefly establishing a reputation as "one of England's most exciting bands of the '80s" and recording a high-profile Peel Session, but failing to break through to widespread commercial success. Swans Way achieved greater recognition for their highly individual and experimental sound, influenced by jazz, soul and French orchestral pop, with their 1984 single "Soul Train" reaching the Top 20 and becoming a classic of its day.

The most successful of Birmingham's eclectic soul- and jazz-influenced post-punks were Fine Young Cannibals, established in 1984 by two former members of The Beat – guitarist Andy Cox and bassist David Steele – who recruited Sparkhill-born former punk Roland Gift as a vocalist. The group's self-titled debut album mixed the influence of English pop, American soul and European dance music and met critical acclaim and some commercial success within the UK, but it was their 1989 second album, The Raw & the Cooked that propelled them to international stardom, reaching number 1 in the UK, the US and Australia and producing two US number 1 singles. The Raw & the Cooked was a "melting pot of styles", its "shopping list of genres" encompassing Mod, funk, Motown, classic British pop, R&B, punk, rock, and disco, while tying them all together into artful contemporary pop. to form "the perfect balance between artistic and commercial, organic and synthetic, past and present".

== New Romantics ==
The genesis of Birmingham's New Romantic scene – "the only one outside of London that ever really mattered" – lay in the 1975 opening of the Hurst Street boutique of fashion designers Kahn and Bell, whose influence was to ensure that Birmingham didn't wholly conform to the uniform punk aesthetic that dominated the rest of the country. By 1977 Martin Degville was designing and selling clothes from his own stall on Birmingham's Oasis fashion market and had become a legendary figure on Birmingham's club scene. Boy George later recalled that it was Degville's influence that led to his own relocation to the West Midlands in 1978: "he wasn't like the other punks, he was wearing stiletto heels and had a massive bleached quiff and huge padded shoulders. He looked brilliant."

As the 1980s arrived, the Rum Runner nightclub played a significant role in rock music in the city, particularly in the case of New Romantic supergroup Duran Duran. Dexys Midnight Runners, Stephen Duffy, The Au Pairs and The Bureau also emanated from the city's music scene at this time.

The Charlatans, Dodgy, Felt, The Lilac Time, and Ocean Colour Scene were other notable rock bands founded in the city and its surrounding area in this period. Pop Will Eat Itself formed in nearby Stourbridge and consisted of Birmingham band members, as did Ned's Atomic Dustbin.

== Bhangra ==
In the 1960s Birmingham was the birthplace of modern bhangra, a form of music which combines the influence of traditional Punjabi dance music with western popular music and urban black music such as reggae and hip-hop. By the 1980s Birmingham was well-established as the global centre of bhangra music production and bhangra culture, which despite remaining on the margins of the British mainstream has grown into a global cultural phenomenon embraced by members of the Indian diaspora worldwide from Los Angeles to Singapore.

The origins of British bhangra lie with Oriental Star Agencies, established by Muhammad Ayub as a small shop selling transistor radios on the Moseley Road in Balsall Heath in 1966, but soon including a business importing and selling recordings of traditional music from India and Pakistan. In 1969 OSA established a record label to record the work of local Birmingham bands Anari Sangeet Party and Bhujhangy Group, and it was Bhujhangy Group's early 1970 single "Bhabiye Akh Larr Gayee" that first took the momentous step of combining traditional Asian sounds with modern western musical instruments and influences. Over the following years a network of local musicians and distributors emerged, recording in studios such as Zella in Edgbaston and distributing their work on cassette through local pubs and electrical goods shops. With a young and culturally self-confident audience of second generation immigrants receptive to musical innovation and experiencing a wide range of music in multi-cultural districts such as Handsworth, bands such as Bhujhangy Group continued to experiment with integrating western music such as guitars into their sound. Newer groups began to take this further: DCS successfully fused bhangra music with rock, using only keyboards, electric guitar and a western drum kit in place of the traditional dhol; while Chirag Pehchan, another Birmingham bhangra band formed the late 1970s, combined bhangra with reggae, ragga, early hip-hop, soul, rock, and dance influences. By the late 1970s bhangra had become well established as a significant and distinctive cultural industry among South Asian communities both in Birmingham and in Southall in London.

The late 1980s and early 1990s marked the heyday of the grassroots bhangra scene. Although the music remained largely underground, with sales of bhangra albums excluded from the British charts due to the scene's separate and often informal distribution networks, successful bhangra bands could sell up to 30,000 cassettes a week, often outselling mainstream top 40 acts. Groups usually featured between 5 and 8 musicians, often freely exchanging members, making one-off recordings and performing at Asian nights and weddings, with only the most successful being able to build longer-term recording and performing careers. A network of late night and weekend events at local nightclubs was supplemented by "All-dayers" that could appeal to younger fans. Bhangra musicians began experimenting with recording technology and with tracks such as Apna Sangeet's 1988 "Soho Road Utey" and DCS's 1991 "Rule Britannia" started to locate their songs within a distinctive British South Asian experience. Handsworth's Soho Road in particular developed a global cultural resonance, symbolising the specific cultural social and political space occupied by British South Asians.

The city's cultural diversity also contributed to the blend of bhangra and ragga pioneered by Apache Indian in Handsworth. Bally Sagoo's 1994 single "Chura Liya" was the first Asian language record to enter the British mainstream top 20.

The late 1990s and early 21st century saw DJs, sampling and remixing gradually increase in importance in Birmingham bhangra and drum and bass grow as a musical influence. British bhangra became increasingly important within India itself, influencing both traditional folk music of the Punjab and wider cultural phenomena such as the music of the Bollywood film industry.

Birmingham's importance in worldwide Bhangra is partly a result of its widespread connections to other areas of South Asian culture, both on the Indian subcontinent and throughout the Indian Diaspora, and partly the result of its concentration of musical infrastructure, with an extensive web of record companies, distributors, recording artists, DJs and marketing activity. Suky Sohal from the band Achanak has also highlighted the importance of Birmingham's tradition of interaction between eclectic musical cultures: "It's such a thriving place for music, it's very sort of inspirational in that sense to produce music with the mixture of different cultures in the city. I mean I was brought up in a white school, I work in a black area, and I play for a bhangra band so I've seen a lot of different cultures, and that does help the music a lot. I think that is why Birmingham is thriving musically ... because you got a lot of different cultures musically, and in everyday life."

== Gospel, soul and contemporary R&B ==
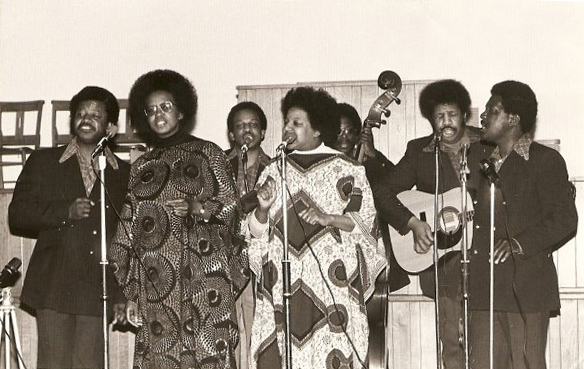
The Singing Stewarts, Britain's first major Gospel group

The Singing Stewarts, a family of five brothers and three sisters who moved to Handsworth from Trinidad in 1961, were the first Gospel group to make an impact in Britain. In 1964 they came to the attention of the Birmingham radio producer Charles Parker, whose resulting documentary "The Colony" was to give the first media exposure to black working-class music in Britain. With their repertoire ranging from negro spirituals to traditional Southern gospel and carrying a distinct Caribbean influence, their appeal transcended cultural barriers to a then-unprecedented degree and although they refused to sing secular music their audience extended to white non-churchgoers across Europe. In 1969 they became the first Gospel Group to be recorded by a major record company when their classic and now extremely rare album Oh Happy Day was recorded by Cyril Stapleton for PYE Records. Continuing Birmingham's tradition of pioneering gospel groups were the Majestic Singers, who formed in Handsworth in 1974 with 26 carefully selected singers from the New Testament Church of God and the intention "to bring to the black choir genre something that was peculiarly British." In 1978 the Irish recording engineer Les Moir first heard the "astonishingly accomplished" work of lead singer Maxine Simpson and pianist Steve Thompson, subsequently recording the 1979 album Free at Last, which would prove groundbreaking for UK Gospel music. The Majestic Singers were instrumental in developing the culture of Gospel music nationwide, promoting the formation groups in London, Manchester and Aberdeen as well as Birmingham.

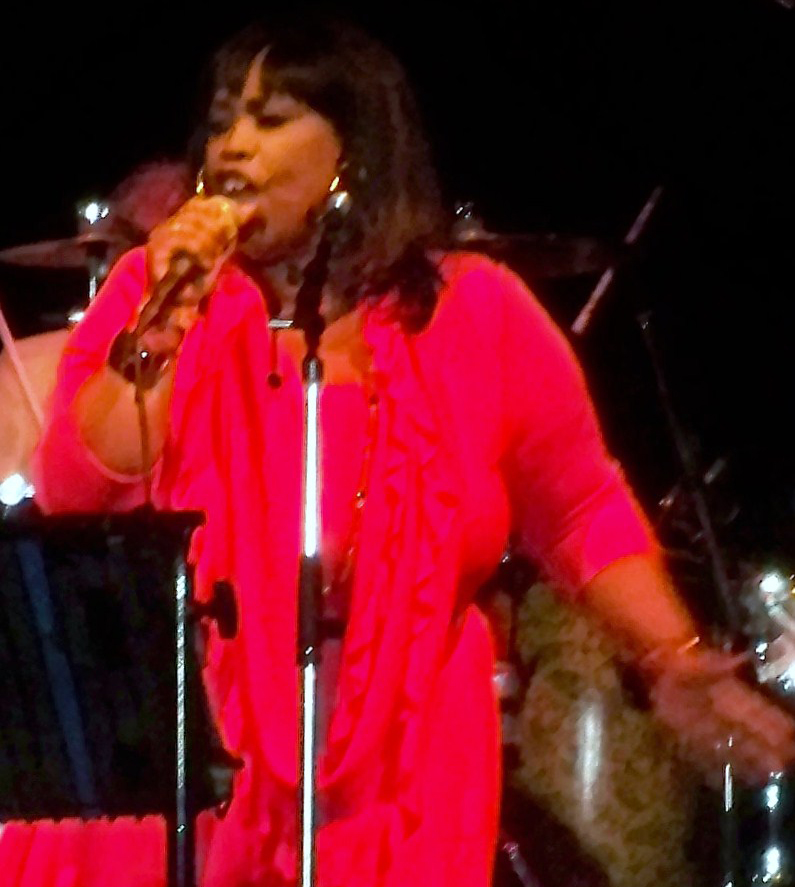
Ruby Turner

During the 1980s the West Midlands lay at the centre of the development of a recognisably British soul style as a series of locally inflected contemporary R&B artists emerged from the area. Jaki Graham was one of the most popular British R&B acts of the 1980s with a string of hits including "Could It Be I'm Falling in Love," "Round and Round" and "Set Me Free". Brought up in Handsworth and educated in Ladywood, she was spotted by a talent scout singing for a jazz-funk band in.1983. By the end of the 1980s she was established as the most successful Black British female artist of all time, and the first to have six consecutive Top 20 hits. Success in the United States followed with her single "Ain't Nobody" spending five weeks at number 1 in the US dance charts in 1994. Also brought up in Handsworth was Ruby Turner, the granddaughter of a noted Jamaican Gospel singer, who moved from Montego Bay to Birmingham at the age of nine. In 1986 she released her debut album Women Hold Up Half the Sky, which had an unusually strong gospel influence for a 1980s soul record and was to prove both a critical and commercial success. Over the next 11 years she got 8 singles in to the UK charts, and in 1990 her single "It's Gonna Be Alright" reached number 1 in the US R&B charts, an extremely rare achievement for a non-American artist.

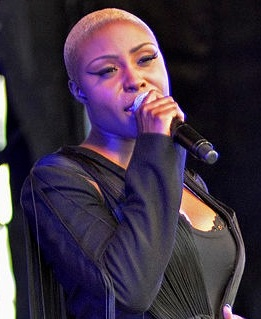
Laura Mvula at Glastonbury in 2013

Steve Winwood, who had been one of the leading figures of Birmingham music in the 1960s with the Spencer Davis Group and Traffic, returned as a solo artist in the 1980s with a hugely successful synthesiser-driven blue-eyed soul sound. His 1980 album Arc of a Diver was a platinum seller in the United States and its first single "While You See a Chance" was also a major international hit. He followed this with two further multi-platinum selling records over the course of the decade – 1986's Back in the High Life and 1988's Roll with It – and series of singles between 1986 and 1990 that all reached number 1 in the American singles charts, including "Higher Love", "The Finer Things", "Back in the High Life Again", "Roll With It" and "Holding On".

The most notable Birmingham soul artist of the early 21st century was Jamelia, who was brought up in Hockley, with an absent father with a conviction for armed robbery and a half-brother later convicted of a gangland murder. Signed to a record deal at 15 after sending an a cappella recording to representatives of Parlophone, she released her first album Drama in 2000, which met with modest commercial success and was accompanied by four singles which each made the Top 40. It was her second album Thank You, released after taking time away from music to raise her first daughter, which catapulted her to stardom, being accompanied by three Top 5 hit singles and seeing her win four MOBO Awards and the Q Award for "Best Single". Thank You stood out from other contemporary British R&B albums in its acknowledgment its British cultural roots and context, and included the title track "Thank You", a cathartic song about surviving domestic violence that peaked at number 2 in the UK charts.

Kings Heath-based Laura Mvula came to national attention in 2013, being nominated for both the Critics Choice award at the 2013 BRIT Awards and for the BBC Sound of 2013 poll. Although her debut album has been commended for being "full blown soul" rather than "pop with the occasional soul leanings", it has brought in a far wider range of influences, including the hook-laden psychedelic music of Birmingham retro-futurists Broadcast as well as the Gospel sound inherited from her time with Black Voices, creating a "sonic space all of her own" that has been dubbed "Gospeldelia".

== Grindcore and extreme metal ==
In the mid 1980s The Mermaid in Birmingham's Sparkhill district lay at the centre of the emergence of grindcore, which combined the influence of hardcore punk and death metal to form arguably the most extreme of all musical genres; and the band Napalm Death, the most influential and commercially successful band of all of the various genres of extreme metal. The Mermaid was a run-down inner-city pub whose upstairs room would host bands that would not be booked by more commercial venues in Birmingham City Centre. Justin Broadrick later remembered: "it was really just a shitty pub in a really shitty area, which just meant that you could get away with a lot more." Promoter Daz Russell started booking hardcore punk bands at the venue in late 1984 and it quickly become an essential stop for touring punk bands and a focal point for fans from all over the country. Napalm Death was formed in nearby Meriden in 1979 by Nik Bullen and Miles "Rat" Ratledge, influenced initially by hardcore punk bands such as Crass, Discharge and Birmingham's GBH. First adopting their name and a settled line-up in late 1981, they produced and traded cassette tapes internationally, and first performed in public in April 1981. Bullen met Justin Broadrick in Birmingham's Rag Market in 1983 and the two started making electronic and industrial music while Napalm Death temporarily ground to a halt. The band resumed activities in 1985 with Broadrick on guitar, increasingly coming under the influence of thrash metal acts such as Celtic Frost, and performing at The Mermaid for the first time in October 1985. Napalm Death soon became almost the house band at the Mermaid, with their growing local following ensuring good crowds for visiting bands.

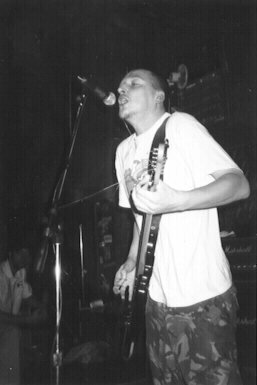
Justin Broadrick performing with industrial metal pioneers Godflesh

By this point Napalm Death had already developed the fusion of punk and metal styles described by Bullen as their objective: "we wanted that hardcore energy meeting slowed down, primitive metal riffs, and to basically marry that to a political message". The final characteristic of what would become the grindcore style was added when Mick Harris replaced Ratledge on drums in November 1985, introducing the fast 64th notes on the bass drum that became known as the blast beat. Although their new, ultra-fast style initially met bemusement amongst their fans, by March 1986 it had become established with a triumphant series of concerts, and in August 1986 the band recorded the demos that would later emerge as the A-side of their debut album Scum in an overnight session at Selly Oak's Rich Bitch studios. By the time the B-side of the album was recorded 7 months later the band's personnel had changed almost completely, with Bullen and Broadrick leaving and being replaced by Lee Dorian and Bill Steer, and only Harris remaining from the earlier line up. Despite this, the release of Scum would prove genre-defining, its "staggeringly intense" sound providing "a rallying call for what seemed like millions of bands to follow". Its influence would also extend well beyond the extreme metal and hardcore subcultures: its extensive radio airplay from John Peel saw it reach the indie Top 10 and the textures of its "unrelenting, intense sound" would attract the attention of exponents of wider experimental musical styles such as ambient music and free jazz.

Justin Broadrick initially left Napalm Death in 1986 to play drums with the Dudley-based grindcore band Head of David, but again grew to feel increasingly constrained by their one-dimensional approach. In 1988 he left to form his own band Godflesh, whose first two releases – the 1988 EP Godflesh and the 1990 album Streetcleaner – sounded unlike any other music up to that point, establishing the new genre of industrial metal from the influences of heavy metal and the more sonically experimental industrial music, and paving the way for the later mainstream success of more accessible examples of the genre such as Nine Inch Nails.

In 1991 Mick Harris also left Napalm Death to pursue more experimental musical directions, teaming up with Nik Bullen to form Scorn, whose first three albums brought a strong dub influence to bear on music that resembled Napalm Death slowed down to a crawl, forming a hybrid ambient metal sound. By the time of their fourth album Evansecence, however, Scorn's work had lost its metal elements and was increasingly based on sampling and electronic music, moving deeply into ambient dub. Harris also joined up with New York City-based musicians Bill Laswell and John Zorn to form Painkiller, whose sound mixed grindcore and free jazz.

== Hip hop and Dance music ==
The hip hop scene dates back to at least 1980, and has produced popular performers like Moorish Delta 7 and Brothers and Sisters.

When hip hop performer Afrika Bambaata visited Britain he inspired new rappers and hip hop DJs including Moorish Delta 7 Elements, Juice Aleem, Roc1, Mad Flow, Creative Habits, Lord Laing, Fraudulent Movements, and DJ Sparra (twice winner of the DMC mixing championships).

House had been played in the City from the mid-1980s, DJ's such as Constructive Trio, Rhythm Doctor at the Powerhouse. Rhythm Doctor worked in one of the shops selling a lot of the early house 12"'s, Tempest. Frenchy (Constructive Trio) also worked in a record shop selling house – Summit Records & Tapes as well as being involved in radio. Pretty B Boy (constructive Trio) had his own record shop opposite St Martin's Church. Mixmaster (constructive Trio) was, as his name suggests, a master of the mix, and also worked in radio.

There were places such as 49er's, Roccoco, Willies T Pot, Mojo, Dial B, Salvation..which played a mixture, from funk, jazz, soul through to house via hip hop and all sorts of everything. Bill, Dick used to do 49ers bar and Roccoco, and earlier Anthony's, along with Ean and Aidan, who did Mjo and Willie's T pot. Nathan dj'd at 49er's around this time, playing everything from Prince to House and Balearic.

The city embraced the national acid house scene in august 1988 with John Slowey and Lee Fisher's Hypnosis on a Thursday night at the Hummingbird which was Birminghams first Acid House / Balearic club. Followed in 1989 by The Snapper club at the same venue, which was Jock Lee and John Maher's Friday night, along with Jock and John, DJ's such as Martin & Bear, Pretty Boy B, amongst others. This span off into bank holiday all-dayers with guests including Lee Fisher, Sacha, Carl Cox etc. Although illegal acid house parties had been popping up in Birmingham before, the first proper legal all night acid party/rave was at The Hummingbird also, and was called Biology, which was a London organisation. Acid house nights such as Spectrum took place in Tamworth and at The Hummingbird in Birmingham. Land of Oz at The Dome with Paul Oakenfold and Trevor Fung in 1989 which occurred on a Wednesday night, the same night The Happy Mondays played at The Hummingbird. Pirate stations such as Fresh FM and PCRL help publicise the music and parties, which help expand the scene in Birmingham. West End Bar was a major meeting place before parties, with Steve Wells and Steve Griffiths and was another important venue throughout this period of time. Electribe 101 hit the charts in 1988 with 'talking with myself'.

Brothers and Sisters took place in the 'Coast to Coast' club in the old ATV television studios on Broad Street in the early 1990s. Then came Fungle Junk, held for many years beneath House music club Fun., and bringing The Psychonaughts, Andy Weatherall and the Scratch Perverts to the city.

Electronic artists include Big beat musicians Bentley Rhythm Ace, Experimental music producer Enarjay 808 the Terminator and Electronica bands Electribe 101, Mistys Big Adventure and Avrocar.

== Techno ==
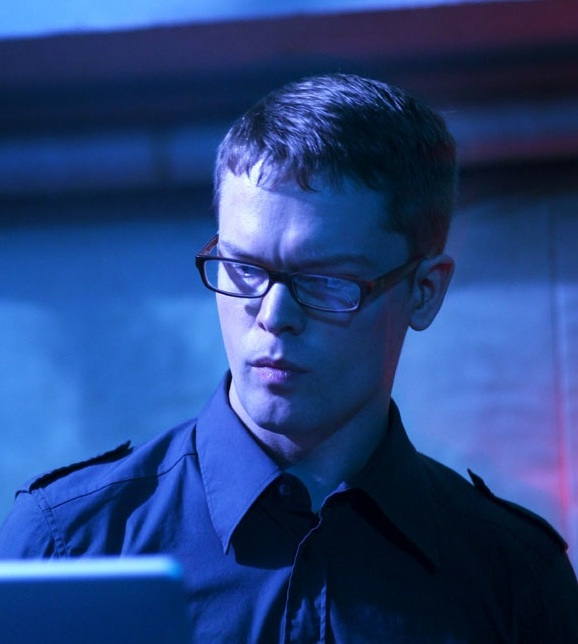
DJ and producer Surgeon, one of the pioneers of techno's Birmingham sound

The Birmingham-based journalist, DJ and record collector Neil Rushton was one of the first outsiders to discover Detroit's emerging techno sound in the late 1980s. It was Rushton's mid-1988 compilation album Techno! The New Dance Sound of Detroit that first identified techno as a distinct musical genre, also being responsible for giving the genre its name, and his Network Records label, based in Stratford House in Birmingham's Camp Hill, that would be instrumental in introducing Detroit techno to British and European audiences over the following years. The importance of Rushton to the emergence of techno was acknowledged in 2011 by Detroit pioneer Derrick May: "The guy discovered us. We were making music, but he brought us together and unified us and gave us the opportunity to attack the world and send our message out."

Over the following decade Birmingham would become synonymous with British techno and established alongside Detroit and Berlin as one of the major centres of techno worldwide as the home of the distinctive Birmingham sound, which differed from the techno of Detroit and Berlin through being stripped almost entirely of its bassline funk, leaving only the cold mechanical drive of its metallic percussion arrangements. Most closely identified with the city's Downwards Records label and its local producers Regis, Surgeon and Female, Birmingham techno's characteristic hard, fast and uncompromising style was influenced as much by the local industrial music scene that developed around Mick Harris of Napalm Death and Martyn Bates of Eyeless in Gaza as it was by the pioneers of American techno. Downwards would become one of the most important labels in world techno, and the "darkly reductionist" influence of its "huge slabs of unrelentingly unchanging minimalism" would be unmistakable in the development of the later techno scenes in New York City and at the Berghain in Berlin.

In 2002 Regis went on to form Sandwell District, initially a label and later an international production collective that included the New York-based Function and the Los Angeles-based Silent Servant, both of whom would briefly relocate to Birmingham. Sandwell District's sound built upon the minimalism that the earlier Birmingham sound had established as the dominant techno aesthetic of the early 2000s, but also challenged it, being characterised by a greater degree of subtlety and refinement and showing influences from wider musical genres including post-punk, shoegaze and death rock. Sandwell District would in turn to create a major shift in world techno and influence another generation of techno musicians. By the time that it announced its "glorious death" in 2012 the American Billboard magazine could write that "Sandwell District's influence on underground techno can hardly be overstated."

Away from the style that bears the city's name, Germ was one of the formative influences on early UK techno, pioneering the combination of the form and techniques of electronic dance music with the more "composerly" models of classical, industrial and experimental jazz music to form what would later become known as electronic listening music, becoming "one of the most influential, under-recognized forces of innovation in the European experimental electronic music scene". Originally a solo project of the Birmingham-born musician Tim Wright, Germ later developed into a collaboration with other musicians including trombonist Hilary Jeffrey, double-bassist Matt Miles, and producer John Dalby. In 1998 Wright and Jeffreys became founder members of the Birmingham-based spin-off project Sand which sought to combine electronic music with organic instrumentation. Wright has also released more dancefloor focused work as Tube Jerk.

== Ambient dub ==
Ambient dub was born as a genre in Birmingham in 1992, when the term was used by the city's independent label Beyond Records for their series of compilation albums documenting the music of the scene that had grown around the Birmingham club Oscillate. While the rest of Britain was dominated by rave, Birmingham developed an underground scene combining the practices of electronic music with the influence of local black and Asian music, particularly the production techniques of dub, to create a highly psychedelic downtempo sound that reinvented trance music by stretching the music out using echo, delay and reverb techniques. Oscillate incorporated these new sounds with surrounding visual effects to create what it called "heliocentric atmospheres", becoming "The club of the moment, making waves far beyond the Midlands".

Oscillate was more about live electronic music performances than DJs playing records and it quickly became the centre of a network of producers and other musical collaborators. The group most closely associated with the club was Higher Intelligence Agency, established at Oscillate by its founder Bobby Bird in May 1992 to improvise live tracks between records, releasing their first track on Beyond's first compilation Ambient Dub Volume 1. In 1993 they released their debut album Colourform and began to take their experimental live act around the country. Also associated with Beyond Records and performing regularly at Oscillate were Leamington Spa-based Banco de Gaia, who built on an ambient dub foundation with samples and elements from Eastern and Arabic music.

Rockers Hi-Fi was formed in 1991 by the former punk Richard "DJ Dick" Whittingham and former rock & roller Glyn Bush, who'd both fallen under the influence of Jamaican dub pioneers King Tubby and Lee "Scratch" Perry in the Birmingham club scene of the mid 1980s. Their debut single "Push Push" and debut album Rockers to Rockers marked the first fusion of the influences of dub and house music and "redefined dub for the acid house generation", going some way to establish the sound that would later become known as trip hop. In 1993 Whittingham and Bush formed the Different Drummer record label, which quickly grew an international roster of artists to become "the premier outlet for forward-thinking dub productions", building links with wider scenes including German and Austrian nu-jazz. They later also launched the Different Drummer sound system, which toured worldwide.

Former Napalm Death drummer Mick Harris's Scorn project severed its last sonic links to its grindcore roots with its 1994 release Evanescence, creating "a dark digital domain where fancy danceable beats pop under thick clouds of textured samples, deep bass and minimal muted vocals"; that redefined ambient dub by moving away from generic Roland TR-808 synthesiser elements and creating a sound much darker than that associated with Oscilllate. Harris' records as Lull went further into the ambient extremes of isolationism, dropping the drums and rhythm loops that characterised Scorn to focus entirely on looped tones and evolving textures, with songs drifting in and out as slow, steady progressions of tones, chimes and drones. Harris also released ambient and dub influenced albums under his own name in collaboration with musicians such as New York City's James Plotkin, and Bill Laswell and Italy's Eraldo Bernocchi.

== Jungle, drum, bass and garage ==
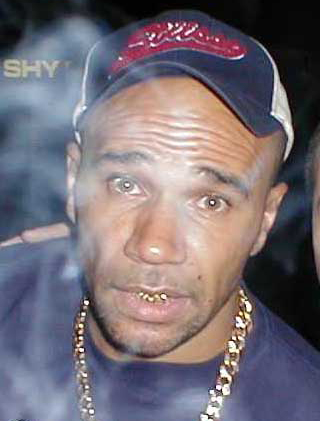
Goldie

Goldie was the first recognisable star of the genre of drum and bass, the first indigenously British form of dance music. Born to the north of Birmingham in Walsall and brought up in foster homes and local authority institutions across the West Midlands county, he spent his early adult life in various cities including Birmingham, London, New York City and Miami. He first built his reputation as a producer with a series of groundbreaking darkcore tracks in the early 1990s, including 1992's "Terminator", arguably the pivotal track of the entire scene. In 1992 he founded Metalheadz with fellow Birmingham-born DJ Kemistry and the following year released "Angel", the track which marked the start of the demise of the dark sound he had earlier epitomised, incorporating samples from Brian Eno and David Byrne and becoming the first track to successfully take hardcore in a more musical direction without losing its essence. In 1995 he took this fusion approach to its ultimate conclusion with the release of his debut album Timeless: an "archive of overlapping sounds from Goldie's past: Jamaican dub, Brit-soul, Detroit techno, hip-hop, and developments in jungle/drum 'n' bass", with Goldie himself crediting these eclectic musical tastes to his rootless Midlands upbringing: "in one room a kid would be playing Steel Pulse, while through the wall someone else had a Japan record on and another guy would be spinning Human League." Timeless was the first drum and bass record to achieve substantial mainstream success. Moving the genre from hardcore's low-brow populism into more progressive musical territory, it was "almost universally hailed as a masterpiece upon release" and left Goldie as the genre's unofficial figurehead, for the first time establishing an English figure with a profile that could match that of the stars of American hip-hop.

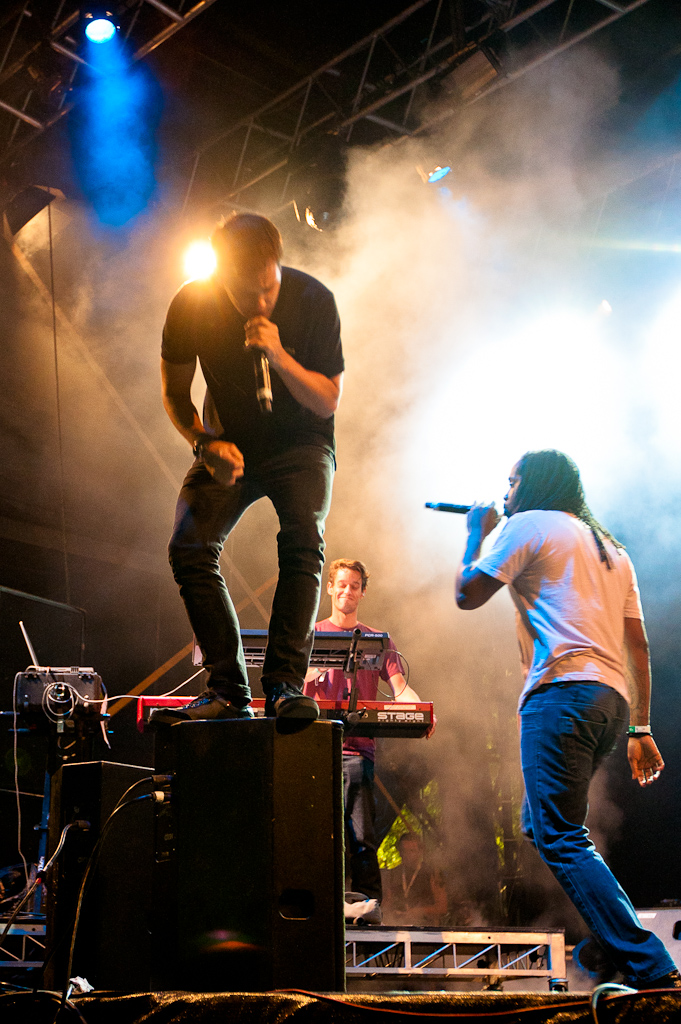
The Streets

Birmingham's Back 2 Basics marked the birth of a new minimalist strain of jungle in 1993 with their stripped-down early tracks "Back 2 Basics" and "Horns 4 '94". The label and its associated producers continued to maintain their faith in "the kind of phat beats and oleaginous basslines that would harden your arteries" over the following years while the wider jungle genre came to embrace more melodic forms. Notable releases included DJ Taktix's extremely rough cut-up 1994 track "The Way" and Asend & Ultravibe's later wistful laments "What kind of World", "Guardian Angel" and "Real Love". Most significant was the track "Dred Bass", released in 1994 by Asend & Ultravibe under the name Dead Dred, which managed to be highly innovative while remaining focused on the essence of jungle; its backwards bassline and skittering snare sound "constituted a landmark in jungle's development into a rhythmic psychedelia" and established the ultra-heavy bass sound that would dominate jungle for the next two years – "as complex and intelligent as any drum 'n' bass track ever made". Later Back 2 Basics work continued this trend with sparse bottom-heavy tracks such Northern Connexion's "Spanish Guitar" and Murphy's Law's even more pared-back "20 Seconds", while a set of releases placing gangsta rap samples over "incredibly evil basslines" laid the foundations of the G-funk-based direction of jump-up.

The most notable act to emerge from Birmingham's garage scene was The Streets, led by the vocalist, producer and instrumentalist Mike Skinner. The Streets' first album Original Pirate Material marked a major change in British music, moving beyond both the retro guitar-based indie bands of the early 2000s and the attempts of British rappers to imitate their more successful American counterparts, by rapping about the everyday details of English suburban existence in a recognisable Brummie accent. Skinner's songwriting connected the production values of garage, grime and 2-step with the English observational songwriting tradition of The Kinks and The Specials, while featuring a characteristically Brummie self-deprecating humour. His debut album was declared to be the album of the 2000s by The Guardian, who commented that it was "impossible to imagine how that decade might have sounded without it", and he would make four further albums over the following years, including the 2004 concept album A Grand Don't Come for Free and his final 2011 album Computers and Blues.

== Retro-futurism ==
While the music of the rest of Britain during the 1990s was dominated by the straightforward revivalism of Britpop, Birmingham developed a more irony-tinged retro-futurist subculture, producing music which was far more experimental in its sound, and whose relationship with the recent past was more ambiguous. The bands associated with the movement were highly varied in their style, ranging from the catchy and ethereal pop of Broadcast, to the more sinister and angular work of Pram and the enigmatically precise instrumental music of Plone. All were however united by their interest in old musical technology that had previously been thought of as modern, and its use to create an ironic sense of "nostalgia for a time when people were optimistic about the future". Tim Felton of Broadcast described how they would "take that from the past, move it forward and present it", though insisting that "it's not a true realisation of the past. It's all perception and reality, which are completely different" The American National Public Radio described Trish Keenan as "an ambassador between the parallel worlds of what happened and what might have been", noting that she was "interested in memory less for nostalgic reasons and more for the world and lives it distorted and rewrote."

Birmingham's divergence from the national mainstream was partly driven by the city's inherently eclectic musical culture. Rosie Cuckston of Pram, originally from Yorkshire, recalled how "coming to Birmingham, you suddenly realise that there's life outside of your pop or punk, and other influences start to feed in". An early review of Broadcast from 1996 described them as "laughing in the face of genres". The architectural critic Owen Hatherley has also linked the scene to Birmingham's unique recent history, as the booming economy and futuristic rebuilding of the postwar era gave way to the economic collapse and melancholic cityscape of the 1980s.

The roots of Birmingham's retro-futurist scene lay in the mid 1980s. The club night Sensateria ran from 1984 to 1994 in various Birmingham venues playing psychedelic and experimental music by artists such as Captain Beefheart and Frank Zappa. It was an important early meeting place, introducing key figures to seminal influences such as the late 1960s Californian band the United States of America. The term Retro-futurism was first applied to music by Brian Duffy, who used it to refer to the music of Stylophonic, which he established with Robert Shaw of Swan's Way in 1984 and whose performances involved 15 analogue synthesisers sequenced live on stage – "We were kind of doing this mix of Kraftwerk, The Walker Brothers and Marc Bolan ... it was synthesiser glam rock"

Pram were the scene's first major group, forming in 1988, with their early sound being limited to vocals and an accompanying theremin. Their minimalist and abrasive 1992 debut Gash stood out from the grunge and shoegazing that dominated alternative music at the time, instead anticipating later developments like lo-fi and post-rock, and their musical palette broadened rapidly over subsequent releases to encompass jazz and hip-hop elements and unusual instrumentation including glockenspiels, toy pianos and a Hawaiian bubble machine. The best known exponents of the scene were Broadcast, who formed in 1995 and of all the Birmingham retrofuturist bands were the most directly influenced by 1960s psychedelia. Fronted by the ethereal vocals of Trish Keenan, Broadcast combined influences as varied as the library music of Basil Kirchin, the children's music of Carl Orff and the soundtracks of Czechoslovak surrealist cinema, while continuing to produce identifiable pop songs. Although they largely eschewed mainstream commercial success, they acquired a large and international cult following and were cited as an influence by artists as diverse as Blur, Paul Weller and Danger Mouse.

== Indie and post-punk revival ==
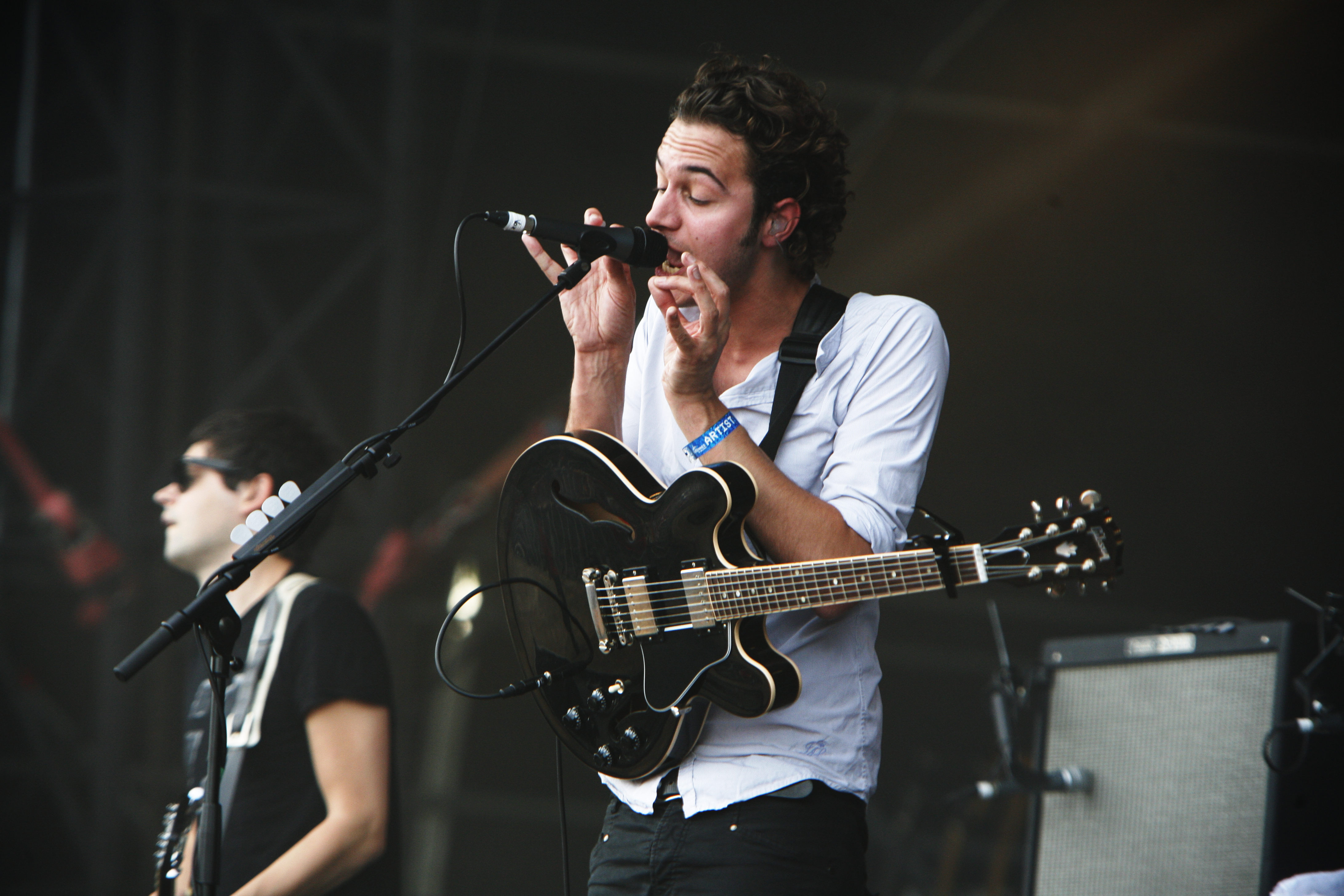
Editors were the second-biggest British band of the first decade of the 21st century

Editors were one of the leading bands of the indie and post-punk revival that spread across Europe and America during the first years of the 21st century. Formed in Stafford in 2002, they moved to Kings Heath in 2003 to seek a record deal in Birmingham, with the band acknowledging the city's "neon late nights" and "the romantic attraction of dark, imposing structures" as formative influences on the dark, angular atmosphere of their music. Dubbed "dark disco" for its "groove-inflected post-punk sound", their 2005 first album The Back Room was nominated for the Mercury Music Prize, and both this album and its 2006 follow-up An End Has a Start sold platinum.

Guillemots

Also nominated for the Mercury Prize in 2006 were Guillemots, the multinational band led by the Moseley and Bromsgrove raised singer, songwriter and multi-instrumentalist Fyfe Dangerfield. Their debut album Through the Windowpane was described by Mojo Magazine as marking "the rebirth of sweeping, experimental British rock music", combining influences from indie pop, jazz, samba, swingbeat and psychedelia, on an album that featured an orchestra, a colliery band, a guitar being played with an electric drill, a brass section and a song described by Stylus Magazine as "something approaching drum 'n' bass as played live and acoustic by idiot savants". Dangerfield belongs in the tradition of genre-defying Birmingham bands such as the Electric Light Orchestra and Dexys Midnight Runners that combined experimental music with catchy pop melodies, describing his carnivalesque vision: "I wanted to be in a band that was like a travelling circus, I didn't want to be in a band where everybody looks the same and listens to the same music... I wanted to get a band together that would be totally different, a bunch of misfits."

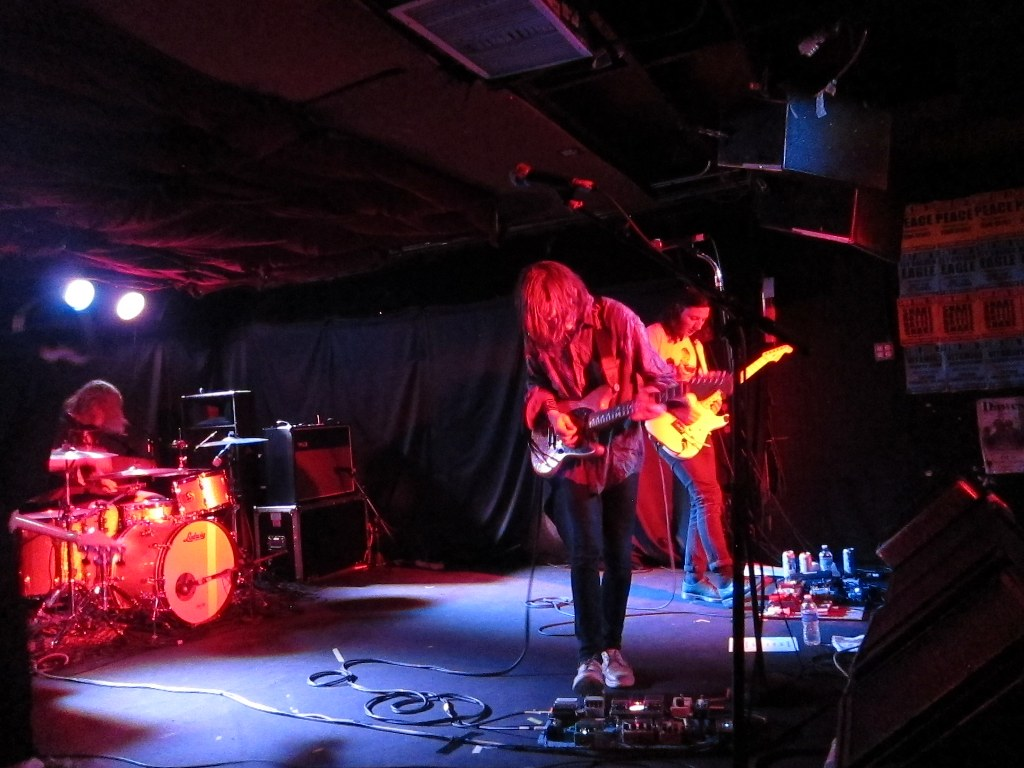
Peace in 2013, at the forefront of the emergence of the B-Town scene

Another Birmingham band whose music is characterised by complex arrangements and unusual instrumentation is Shady Bard whose lo-fi folk-influenced indie music is inspired by its founder Lawrence Becko's synesthesia.

Since 2012 the Digbeth-based B-Town scene has attracted widespread attention, led by bands such as Peace and Swim Deep, with the NME comparing Digbeth to London's Shoreditch, and The Independent writing that "Birmingham is fast becoming the best place in the UK to look to for the most exciting new music". Although many of the scene's leading bands don't sound very similar, critics have identified a common element as how the bands "all incorporate a slightly flippant attitude to their music, not concentrating on polishing their records to perfection, but playing for the joy of creating music and for entertaining their audiences."

== List of notable historical musical artists ==
Successful Birmingham singer-songwriters and musicians include Steve Gibbons, Mike Kellie (of Spooky Tooth), Blaze Bayley (former vocalist of Wolfsbane and Iron Maiden), Keith Law (of Velvett Fogg & Jardine) Jeff Lynne, Jamelia, Kelli Dayton of The Sneaker Pimps, Martin Barre (guitarist with Jethro Tull), Steve Cradock (guitarist for Ocean Colour Scene and Paul Weller), Stephen "Tin Tin" Duffy, Fritz Mcintyre (keyboardist of Simply Red), Christine Perfect (of Fleetwood Mac), Nick Rhodes, John Henry Rostill (bass guitarist/composer for The Shadows), Mike Skinner, John Taylor, Roger Taylor, Ted Turner (guitar/vocals, Wishbone Ash), Peter Overend Watts and Dave Mason.

== Contemporary venues, festivals and organisations ==
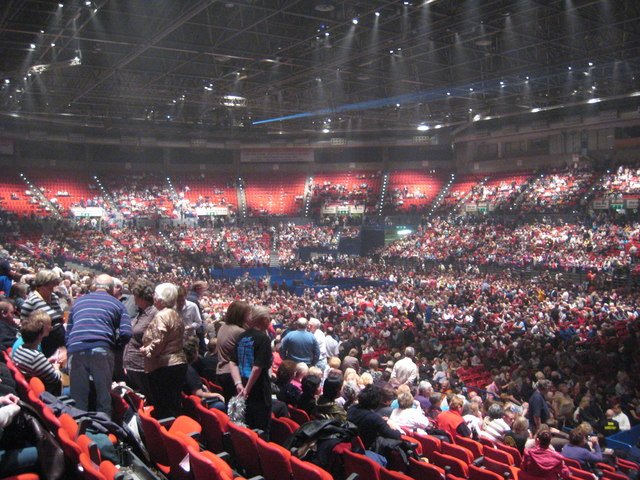
Birmingham's largest indoor venue, the National Indoor Arena

Birmingham's current music venues – large and small – include Symphony Hall at the ICC, The National Indoor Arena, O2 Academy Birmingham, the National Exhibition Centre, The CBSO Centre, The Glee Club, The Adrian Boult Hall at Birmingham Conservatoire, The Yardbird, mac (Midlands Arts Centre) at Cannon Hill Park, The Custard Factory, the Drum Arts Centre, The Jam House, and pub and bar venues including The Rainbow (Digbeth), The Bull's Head (in the suburb of Moseley), The Cross (Moseley), the Ceol Castle (Moseley), the Hare and Hounds (Kings Heath), Scruffy Murphy's, the Jug of Ale, The Queen's Arms (city centre), a branch of Barfly and the Hibernian. Leftfoot is a soul jazz and funk night that has featured on BBC Radio 1.

Party in the Park was Birmingham's largest annual music festival, at Cannon Hill Park, where up to 30,000 revellers of all ages listen to popular chart music. Now it has become a day for the unsigned of all genres and was brought back to life in 2013 as unsigned acts decided it was time for them to do a day of their own. The group Birmingham Promotions, a non-profit group made up of musicians, agents and promoters have come together to invest their own time and money into a day for the whole family. There is also Moseley Folk and Arts Festival (since 2006), which takes place in Moseley Park and mixes new with established folk acts.

Supersonic Festival has been in Birmingham annually since 2003, hosting experimental and unusual music, with bands such as The Pop Group, Richard Dawson, Wolf Eyes and Mogwai.

A short lived music festival was Gigbeth, first piloted in March 2006 and now annual on the first weekend of November in Digbeth. It was a festival celebrating local independent music from the West Midlands.

Notable dance music record labels include Network Records (of Altern8 fame), Different Drummer, Urban Dubz Records, Badger Promotions, Jibbering Records, Iron Man, Earko, FHT and Munchbreak Records. Punch Records, in the Custard Factory, run street dance and DJ training courses.

While there is a thriving music scene in the city and a number of rehearsal studios such as Robannas, Rich Bitch and Madhouse (many of which have their own demo recording studios) there are very few working at a professional level. Until Circle Studios opened its 3,000-square-foot (280 m^{2}) facility in 2007, aside from private studios in the hands of UB40 and Ocean Colour Scene and smaller studios such as Artisan Audio, there was no high-end recording studio operating in Birmingham.

Independent shops in the city selling records include Swordfish Records, Tempest Records, Jibbering Records, Punch Records, Old School Daze, Dance Music Finder Records, Three Shades Records and Hard To Find Records, which is the original 'dance music finder' in the UK and now trades as one of the largest vinyl record and DJ shops in the world. Summit Records sells mainly reggae and doubles as an Afro-Caribbean barbers.

Birmingham was the birthplace of Street Soul Productions, a record label established in 2005, which became a community organisation in 2008, and since then has concentrated on music workshops and events alongside online broadcasting. Street Soul Productions is aimed at an Alternative UK Hip Hop. It embraces a wide range of different styles, and incorporating emcees, singers, DJs, Producers and session musicians.

== Bibliography ==
- Burnham, Anthony (2009), "Built On Sand: A Birmingham Sampler '78–'86", FACT Magazine, London: The Vinyl Factory
- Cope, Andrew L. (2010), "Birmingham: The Cradle of All Things Heavy", Black Sabbath and the rise of heavy metal music, Farnham, Surrey: Ashgate, pp. 7–41, ISBN 978-0754668817
- Cotton, Ross (1 May 2012), "Retro-futurism: Birmingham's imaginary world", Something in the Water, Birmingham, pp. 22–39
- Dudrah, Rajinder Kumar (2002), "Cultural Production in the British Bhangra Music Industry: Music-Making, Locality, and Gender" (PDF), International Journal of Punjab Studies, 9: 197–229, archived from the original (PDF) on 12 October 2013
- Dudrah, Rajinder Kumar; Chana, Boy; Talwar, Ammo (2007), Bhangra: Birmingham and Beyond, Birmingham: Punch Records, ISBN 978-0709302568
- Glasper, Ian (2012), Trapped in a Scene: UK Hardcore 1985–1989 (Kindle ed.), London: Cherry Red Books, ASIN: B008P1GXWU
- Hebdige, Dick (1987), Cut 'n' Mix: Culture, Identity and Caribbean Music, New York: Taylor & Francis Group (published 2005), ISBN 978-0203359280
- Hornsby, Laurie (1999), Lavender, Mike (ed.), Brum rocked!, Birmingham: TGM, ISBN 978-0953695102
- Hornsby, Laurie (2003), Lavender, Mike (ed.), Brum rocked on!, Birmingham: TGM, ISBN 978-0953695157
- Mudrian, Albert (2004), Choosing Death: The Improbable History of Death Metal and Grindcore, Port Townsend, WA: Feral House, ISBN 978-1932595048
- Murray, Enda, ed. (1994), Sound System (Film), Firbolg Films
- Ogg, Alex (2006), No More Heroes: A Complete History of UK Punk from 1976 to 1980 (Kindle ed.), London: Cherry Red Books, ASIN B008X42GAW
- Reynolds, Simon (2009), Rip it Up and Start Again: Postpunk 1978–1984, London: Faber & Faber, ISBN 978-0571252275
- Rimmer, Dave (2003), New Romantics: The Look, London: Omnibus Press, ISBN 978-0711993969
- Ritu, D. J. (1999), "Bhangra/Asian Beat - one-way ticket to British Asia", in Broughton, Simon; Ellingham, Mark; Trillo, Richard (eds.), World music: the rough guide. Africa, Europe and the Middle East, London: Rough Guides, ISBN 978-1858286358
- Sarig, Roni (1998), Secret History of Rock: The Most Influential Bands You've Never Heard, New York: Billboard Books, ISBN 978-0823076697
- Shapiro, Peter (1999), Drum 'n' Bass: The Rough Guide, London: Rough Guides, ISBN 978-1858284330
- Smith, Steve Alexander (2009), British Black Gospel, Oxford: Monarch Books, ISBN 978-1854248961
- Toynbee, Jason (2005), "Birmingham", in Shepherd, John; Horn, David; Laing, Dave (eds.), Continuum Encyclopedia of Popular Music of the World, vol. 7, New York, pp. 354–355, ISBN 978-0826474360
- Valk, Robin (2010), Handsworth Evolution, Birmingham: Birmingham Music Heritage
