= Caribbean music in the United Kingdom =

Contribution to British Black music

People from the Caribbean have made significant contributions to British Black music for many generations.

== Trinidadian calypso ==
Large-scale Caribbean migration to England recommenced following the Second World War in 1948. The Empire Windrush carried almost 500 passengers from Jamaica, including Lord Kitchener, a calypso singer from Trinidad.By chance, a local newsreel company filmed him singing "London Is the Place for Me" as he got off the ship. The 1951 Festival of Britain brought the Trinidad All Steel Percussion Orchestra (TASPO) and Roaring Lion to public attention. The smart set in Oxford and Cambridge adopted both calypso and steelband for debutante parties. In 1959, Trinidadian Claudia Jones started the Notting Hill Carnival.They brought Mighty Sparrow and others directly from Trinidad.Edric Connor had arrived in England from Trinidad in 1944. He starred in a West End musical called Calypso in 1948.A white Danish duo, Nina & Frederik, recorded several calypsos from 1958 to 1962, scoring in the charts. Cy Grant (from Guyana) sang a song by Lord Kitchener in the TV drama A Man from the Sun in 1956. It told the story of Caribbean migrants. From 1957 to 1960, Grant sang calypsos on the BBC TV news programme Tonight. In 1962, English comedian Bernard Cribbins had a hit with "Gossip Calypso". In 2002, London Is the Place for Me: Trinidadian Calypso, 1950-1956 was finally released in Britain.

== Reggae and ska ==
Cecil Bustamante Campbell (Prince Buster) was born in 1938 in Orange Street, Kingston, Jamaica. In 1961, he signed to Blue Beat Records.

In 1962, Jamaica won its independence and Island Records was founded. One of the record label's producers, Chris Blackwell, brought Millie Small to Britain in 1963. Her high-pitched, slightly nasal voice had wide appeal with "My Boy Lollipop", which reached number 2 in the UK. It was perceived as a novelty pop song, not the start of a boom in ska. It was not until 1969 that reggae artists began to receive significant airplay. Dave and Ansell Collins, Ken Boothe and John Holt had hits.

Symarip (also known at various stages of their career as the Bees, the Pyramids, Seven Letters and Zubaba) were a ska and reggae band from the United Kingdom, originating in the late 1960s, when Frank Pitter and Michael Thomas founded the band as the Bees. The band's name was originally spelled Simaryp, which is an approximate reversal of the word "pyramids". Consisting of members of West Indian descent, Simaryp is widely marked as one of the first skinhead reggae bands, being one of the first to target skinheads as an audience. Their hits included "Skinhead Girl", "Skinhead Jamboree" and "Skinhead Moonstomp", the latter of which was based on the Derrick Morgan song, "Moon Hop".

Trojan Records was founded in 1968, named after producer Duke Reid, known as 'The Trojan'. It brought Jamaican recordings to Britain. Their first hit was Jimmy Cliff's "Wonderful World, Beautiful People" in 1969. The label had 28 other hits.

The first Jamaican performers to reach number one in Britain were Desmond Dekker and the Aces with "Israelites" in 1969. The second were Dave and Ansil Collins with "Double Barrel" in 1971, followed by Ken Boothe with his version of "Everything I Own" in 1974, and Althea & Donna with "Uptown Top Ranking" in 1977.

Bob Marley came from Jamaica to London and recorded Catch a Fire in 1972, returning to record Exodus and Kaya in 1977. Eddy Grant was born in Guyana in 1948 and grew up in Brixton. He was part of the Equals, the first multi-racial group to reach number one in the UK with "Baby Come Back" in 1968. He took Caribbean music further in the direction of rock than anyone else. His gritty voice took "Electric Avenue" to the top 10 twice. His studio in Barbados has been used by Sting and Elvis Costello.

== Roots and dub ==
Roots reggae was increasingly popular with the UK's black working-class youth from the 1970s onwards, its message of Rastafari and overcoming injustice striking a chord with those on the receiving end of racism and poverty. Jamaicans who had settled in the UK (and their children who had been born here) were instrumental in setting up a network of reggae soundsystems. The most popular soundsystems included Jah Shaka, Coxsone Outernational, Fatman, Jah Tubbys and Quaker City.

A number of producers such as Dennis Bovell, Mad Professor and Adrian Sherwood began to record UK and Jamaican artists and release their records.

Bands such as Aswad, Steel Pulse, Misty In Roots and Beshara released records and played gigs throughout the UK.

As roots music's popularity waned in Jamaica in the 1980s, soundsystems such as Jah Shaka kept the faith in the UK, influencing a new generation of producers, soundsystems and artists, including The Disciples, Iration Steppas, Jah Warrior and The Rootsman. This scene has been referred to as "UK Dub".

The 1990s saw a resurgence of interest in 70s roots reggae and dub with a number of UK-based specialist labels such as Pressure Sounds, Soul Jazz and Blood & Fire being set up to re-release classic recordings.

== "Punky Reggae Party" ==
"Punky Reggae Party" is a song written by Bob Marley as a positive response to the emerging UK punk scene.

Roots and Dub music gained popularity with UK punks in the mid-70s, with Don Letts playing reggae records alongside punk ones at the Roxy nightclub and Johnny Rotten citing Dr Alimantado's "Born for a Purpose" as one of his favourite records in a radio interview. After the Sex Pistols split, Rotten was sent to Jamaica by Virgin Records as a talent scout for their Frontline reggae sub-label.

The Clash started out as a straight-ahead punk rock group, but their first album covered "Police & Thieves", a reggae track by Junior Murvin. Their bass player Paul Simonon was a reggae enthusiast. Increasingly the group took significant influence from reggae, on tracks such as "The Guns of Brixton", which used themes of impoverished criminality and a renegade lifestyle, with a punky edge. Their track "(White Man) In Hammersmith Palais" was written about the group's experience at a reggae dance. Jamaican reggae producer Lee Perry was brought in to produce the tune "Complete Control".

The Ruts recorded the reggae-inspired "Babylon's Burning", "Jah War", "Love in Vain" and "Give Youth a Chance", while The Members recorded similar white reggae tracks such as "Don't Push" and "Offshore Banking Business". The Boomtown Rats similarly released a number of reggae-inspired records, such as "Banana Republic" and later "House on Fire".

Towards the end of the 1970s, punk and reggae groups would appear on the same bills at Rock Against Racism events.

== Lovers rock ==
While most of the developments in the music took place in Jamaica (dub, toasting, dancehall, ragga) there was one form that was born in Britain. Lovers rock, developed in the 1970s, was a smooth, soulful version of reggae, spearheaded by Dennis Brown.

The early years of "lovers rock" have two main resonances: London "blues parties" and discs by girl singers who sounded as if they were still worrying about their school reports. The record that kick-started the phenomenon was the 14-year-old Louisa Mark's plaintive reading of Robert Parker's soul hit, "Caught You In A Lie", with Matumbi as backing group and production by sound-system man Lloyd Coxsone (b. Lloyd Blackwood, Jamaica); this appeared on Coxsone's Safari imprint in 1975 and was impressive enough to see release in Jamaica by Gussie Clake. Several of Louisa Mark's subsequent titles, including "All My Loving" (Safari) and "Six Sixth Street" (Bushays), repeated the success and have remained favourites at revive sessions ever since.

Mark's hit was followed by Ginger Williams' "Tenderness" (Third World), and a genre was born-essentially Philly/Chicago soul ballads played over fat reggae basslines. The style was consolidated by the husband-and-wife team of Dennis and Eve Harris who had a big hit with the white singer T.T. Ross's massively popular "Last Date" (Lucky), another key record, and set up a new imprint, Lover's Rock, giving the genre its name.

Labels such as Fashion Records and Ariwa helped broaden the audience for lovers rock beyond its original teenage market. Artists including Peter Hunnigale, Sylvia Tella, Michael Gordon and Keith Douglas continued to achieve commercial success within the genre despite receiving limited coverage from mainstream music press.

== White reggae ==
The influence of reggae was felt in rock almost immediately, but usually surfaced as a tangential reference in some stars' isolated songs. The Beatles song 1964 "I Call Your Name," for instance, has a ska break; a few years later, they would appropriate the reggae rhythm for 1968 "Ob-La-Di, Ob-La-Da".

Chris Andrews (born 1942) was a songwriter for Sandie Shaw. The song "Yesterday Man" was inappropriate for her, so he sang it himself and it went to number 3 in the UK Singles Chart in 1965. At the time, the musical style was called bluebeat, a music genre that is now recognized by most as ska or reggae. He followed this with "To Whom It Concerns" (number 13 in 1965) and "Something on My Mind" (number 41 in 1966).

Paul McCartney bought Jamaican-imported singles, but this was not obvious in The Beatles' repertoire until "Ob-La-Di, Ob-La-Da" on the White Album. There was a gentle reggae beat in some of his later solo singles, such as "Another Day" and "Silly Love Songs". He also named one of his Christmas song covers "Rudolph The Red-Nosed Reggae". Other pop hits include "Sugar, Sugar" by the Archies (number 1 in 1969) and "I Can See Clearly Now" by Johnny Nash (number 5 in 1972). Also in the mid-1970s, art rockers 10cc released a few reggae-styled singles, including "Dreadlock Holiday".

Ska/reggae artist Judge Dread (named after a Prince Buster character) released his first single in 1972; the somewhat X-rated "Big Six", which went to number 11. Judge Dread (born Alexander Hughes) continued his popularity with other rude songs, chiefly enjoyed by skinheads, who had always been avid fans of ska and reggae. Skinheads were preceded by the mods, who were the first real white supporters of ska/bluebeat in the 1960s. Georgie Fame, a mod R&B favourite, popularised a ska feel in his music at times.

The Police's first top 20 single was "Roxanne" and although styled on bossa nova or tango had a reggae guitar sound. It was followed by "Can't Stand Losing You", "So Lonely", "Walking on the Moon" and others with more identifiably reggae beats. Sting's somewhat interesting Jamaican accent attracted criticism, but the band was commercially successful. Blondie's "The Tide is High" was perhaps the first big white reggae hit in Britain and also draws on the lovers rock elements of reggae. Both Harry Belafonte and Nina & Frederik had hits with "Mary's Boy Child", but it was Boney M who gave this slow ballad a reggae rhythm in 1978 and took it to number 1 in the UK Singles Chart for four weeks.

== Reggae ==
UB40, formed in Birmingham, achieved sustained commercial success with a style influenced by reggae. Alongside their original material, the band became known for recording cover versions of both reggae and non-reggae songs. These included "Kingston Town", "I Got You Babe", "Many Rivers to Cross" and "Here I Am (Come and Take Me)", Their version of "Red Red Wine" became a major hit; the band had been familiar with a reggae version of the song by Tony Tribe and were initially unaware that it had originally been written and recorded by Neil Diamond.

== 2-tone ==
2 Tone Records, founded in 1979, combined ska, reggae and rock, which evolved out of punk rock, spawning the 2 tone movement with bands such as the Specials, the Selecter, Madness and the Beat. The 2-tone sound continued and evolved into the 1980s, with bands such as the Hot Knives, the Loafers and Potato 5.

== Gospel ==
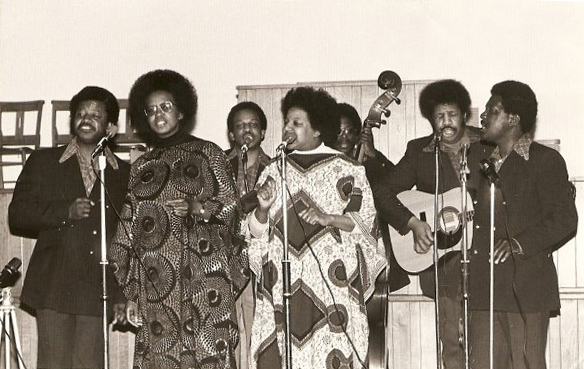
The Singing Stewarts performing at Newbold College

Gospel music, although a subgenre of black music in the UK today, also arrived in England in the early post-war years, along with the large-scale immigrant influx and their wide variety of musical tastes. Pioneers in this field include an eight-piece a cappella family group from Trinidad called the Singing Stewarts - Oscar Stewart, Ashmore Stewart, Frankie Stewart, Phylis Stewart, Gloria Stewart, Timothy Stewart, Thedore Stewart and Del Stewart - who were the first to appear on a major British record label in the late 1960s. They impressed many English audiences with their unique interpretation of negro spirituals and traditional gospel songs. Based in Birmingham in the Midlands, they appeared on numerous radio shows and participated in the prestigious Edinburgh Festival, again increasing awareness of this genre.

In later years and decades when black people began to settle in the UK, groups such as the Doyleys, Paradise, Lavine Hudson and the Bazil Meade-inspired London Community Gospel Choir began to drive the music much further towards the mainstream and out of the comfort zone of the black churches.

The Singing Stewarts are featured in the book British Black Gospel: The Foundations of This Vibrant UK Sound by Steve Alexander Smith. The Huddersfield-born Smith was inspired to write the book after spending time in the US in the mid-1990s and witnessing the best that black gospel could offer.

The book is the world's first to cover the underground British black gospel scene and is published with a 13-track CD.

== Folk music ==
While many immigrants from the Caribbean brought with them the folk music of the area, it was not until the 1960s when the Spinners, a folk group from Liverpool, England, who were the first multiracial singing group to have major success in the UK brought Caribbean folk music into the mainstream. Cliff Hall, their West Indian singer and guitarist, born in Cuba and brought up in Jamaica, brought many songs from the Caribbean to their repertoire including "Woman Sweeter Than Man", "Matty Rag" and "Linstead Market".

== See also ==
- British Afro-Caribbean community
- British black gospel
