= MD7 =

MD7 or MD-7 may refer to:

- Maryland Route 7
- Maryland's 7th congressional district
- Moorish Delta 7, a British hip-hop group
