= British Black music =

Music of the African diaspora

British Black music refers to music of the African diaspora, or music derived from the African diaspora which has been produced in Great Britain regardless of the ethnic background of the musicians.

== Awards ==
Since 1996, the annual British MOBO awards ceremony has honoured achievements in "music of black origin".

== Genres ==
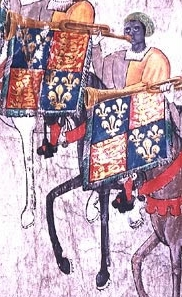
Extract from the Westminster Tournament Roll probably showing John Blanke, a trumpeter of the 16th century blowing a clarion trumpet.

- 2-step garage
- Afroswing
- Bassline
- Britfunk
- British black gospel
- British blues
- British hip hop
- British jazz
- British reggae
- British soul
- Drum and bass
- Dubstep
- Grime
- Jungle
- Lovers rock
- Progressive rap
- Ragga jungle
- Trip hop
- UK garage
- UK funky
- UK gospel
- UK drill

== Organisations and events ==
- African Society of Literati, Musicians, and Artists (established 1897)
- Music Of Black Origin Awards (MOBOs) (established 1996)
- Urban Music Seminar (1997 – 2004)

== Notable contributors to British black music ==
=== 16th century ===
- John Blanke (fl. 1501–1511)

=== 18th century ===
- George Bridgetower (1778 – 1860)
- Joseph Emidy (c. 1775 – 1835)
- Ignatius Sancho (c. 1729 – 1780)

=== 19th century ===
- Samuel Coleridge-Taylor (1875 – 1912)
- Fisk Jubilee Singers

=== 20th century ===
- Beverley Knight (born 1973)
- Billy Ocean (born 1950)
- Gabrielle (born 1969)
- Jaki Graham (born 1956)
- Joan Armatrading (born 1950)
- Junior Giscombe (born 1957)
- Ken "Snakehips" Johnson (1914 – 1941)
- Labi Siffre (born 1945)
- Lynden David Hall (1974 – 2006)
- Maxi Priest (born 1961)
- Mica Paris (born 1969)
- Omar (born 1968)
- Sade (born 1959)
- Shaznay Lewis (born 1975)
- Shola Ama (born 1979)
- Sonique (born 1965)
- Amazulu (band)
- Aswad
- Cleopatra
- D'Influence
- Five Star
- A Guy Called Gerald
- Heatwave (band)
- The Real Thing (British band)
- Imagination
- Loose Ends (band)
- Musical Youth
- Skin (Skunk Anansie)
- Soul II Soul
- Southern Syncopated Orchestra
- The Specials

=== Early 21st century ===
- AJ Tracey (born 1994)
- Arlo Parks (born 2000)
- Dave (born 1998)
- Dizzee Rascal (born 1984)
- FKA Twigs (born 1988)
- Ghetts (born 1984)
- J Hus (born 1996)
- Jammer (born 1982)
- Jim Legxacy (born 2000)
- JME (born 1985)
- Jorja Smith (born 1997)
- Kano (born 1985)
- Kele Okereke (born 1981)
- Labrinth (born 1989)
- Lady Leshurr (born 1987)
- Leigh-Anne Pinnock (born 1991)
- Lethal Bizzle (born 1984)
- Little Simz (born 1994)
- Michael Kiwanuka (born 1987)
- MNEK (born 1994)
- Ms Banks (born 1994)
- Raleigh Ritchie (born 1990)
- Sampha (born 1988)
- Skepta (born 1982)
- Stormzy (born 1993)
- Tinie Tempah (born 1988)
- Wiley (born 1979)
- Wretch 32 (born 1985)
- Rizzle Kicks
- Krept & Konan
- So Solid Crew

== See also ==
- Black British
- Caribbean music in the United Kingdom
- Music of Africa
- British Black Gospel
