= Velvett Fogg =

British band

- Origin: Birmingham, England
- Genre: Psychedelic rock
- Years active: 1968–1970
- Labels: Pye, Sanctuary, Castle, See For Miles, Past and Present, Bam-Caruso, Akarma, Seque, Rolling Stone, Metro, Pye/Esoteric
- Past members: Frank Wilson; Keith Law, Jardine, Paul Eastment; Mick Pollard; Graham Mullet; Tony Iommi; Ernie Handy; Bob Hewitt; Ian Leighton
- Website: Velvett Fogg Official Site

Velvett Fogg were a British psychedelic rock band. Tony Iommi was a member in mid-1968, but soon left to form Black Sabbath. Their lone eponymous album was released in January 1969, and re-released on CD by Sanctuary Records in 2002.

== Development ==
Velvett Fogg were one of many new bands within the underground scene, that were formed at the end of the 1960s that would attempt to take pop music to a higher level of creativity. Birmingham also had its own flourishing underground music scene during that time with a variety of innovative groups emerging. The line up of Velvett Fogg all came from within this alternative music scene in the city.

Velvett Fogg were formed in 1968 from members of a Birmingham band Gravy Train. Up front was soul singer Ernie Handy, Bob Hewitt was lead guitarist, with Graham Mullett on drums, and Mick Pollard on bass guitar. Londoner Frank Wilson who played Hammond organ, was also on vocals, eventually becoming band leader and lead vocalist. The newly formed band spent most of the year touring Germany playing at army bases and clubs. Their stage act included a light show and a go-go dancer.

== Velvett Fogg, the album ==
On their return to Birmingham, the band, now managed by an agency called Inter City Artists, were given a record deal by Jack Dorsey of Pye Records. It was also a time when it seemed that the more unusual or controversial a band was, then the greater chance there would be for success in the record business. The record label was looking to sign unusual underground music acts and Velvett Fogg were told to, in Jack Dorsey's words, "develop an image that would make people think you would piss on the pope!" (Keith Law).

The initial line-up of Velvett Fogg featured guitarist Tony Iommi (later with Black Sabbath). Iommi was in the line-up for only one gig before he left to be replaced temporarily by Ian Leighton. Leighton was "a great blues guitarist", said his friend Frank Wilson. It was during this time that Pye Records arranged a photo-shoot of the band for the cover of their proposed first album.

Before recording could begin in late 1968, Ian Leighton left the band and was replaced by guitarist/vocalist Paul Eastment (a cousin of Iommi). Paul Eastment contributed original compositions for the album, as did Frank Wilson, Graham Mullet and Mick Pollard.

Velvett Fogg recorded the tracks for their debut album on Pye Records under the direction of Jack Dorsey. Apparently, Dorsey aimed to get the band onto the then-popular progressive band wagon. "I was a classically trained pianist but we all had to play way below our capabilities" said Frank Wilson. The band were also allowed to record covers of a few songs they liked, and these included psychedelic-sounding versions of "New York Mining Disaster 1941" by The Bee Gees and Tim Rose's "Come Away Melinda".

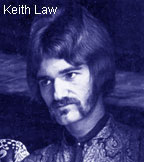
Keith Law in 1969

=== Keith Law ===
Original songs for the Velvett Fogg album were supplied by Keith Law, a local who became a friend of the band. A veteran of the West Midlands music scene, Law played with such groups as The Williamsons, Love and Understanding, Paint, and Jardine. In his initial writing sessions with the band Law came up with "Yellow Cave Woman", "Once Among The Trees" and "Within' The Night".

=== Album cover controversy ===
Velvett Fogg's self-titled album was released on the Pye label in January 1969. By far the most controversial feature of the album was its record cover, which displayed the pre-Paul Eastment line-up of the band wearing garish make-up/body-paint and costume, but also included two well-endowed young women, wearing nothing but strategically applied body paint. The package was accompanied by a typically obscure sleevenote by the disc jockey John Peel who commented that "there is a lot of good music on this record. Remember Velvett Fogg - you will hear the name again."

== "Telstar" single ==
Along with the Velvett Fogg album, Pye Records also released a single by the group. It was a cover of The Tornados instrumental, "Telstar", which was recorded at the request of Jack Dorsey, who hoped to cash in on the publicity surrounding the American Moon landings taking place at that time.

== Group disbanded ==
While receiving some radio play, the record did not sell enough copies to chart, and a big advertising campaign planned by the record company to promote the album never materialised. The band did some touring after the single came out. Perhaps discouraged by poor sales of the album, Pye seemed to lose interest in the band, so withdrew their backing. In the autumn of 1969 the group disbanded with the members going their separate ways. Frank Wilson said "I personally thought the first line-up in Germany was the best and most satisfying."

== Aftermath ==
Frank Wilson in Warhorse. 1970

Frank Wilson returned to London and joined Riot Squad and then The Rumble Band before following in Rick Wakeman's footsteps to join Warhorse in 1970.

Paul Eastment started a Birmingham band called Holy Ghost — later to become The Ghost, with whom he recorded a couple of albums. He later fronted another group called Resurrection, as well as recording with local folk singer, Shirley Kent.

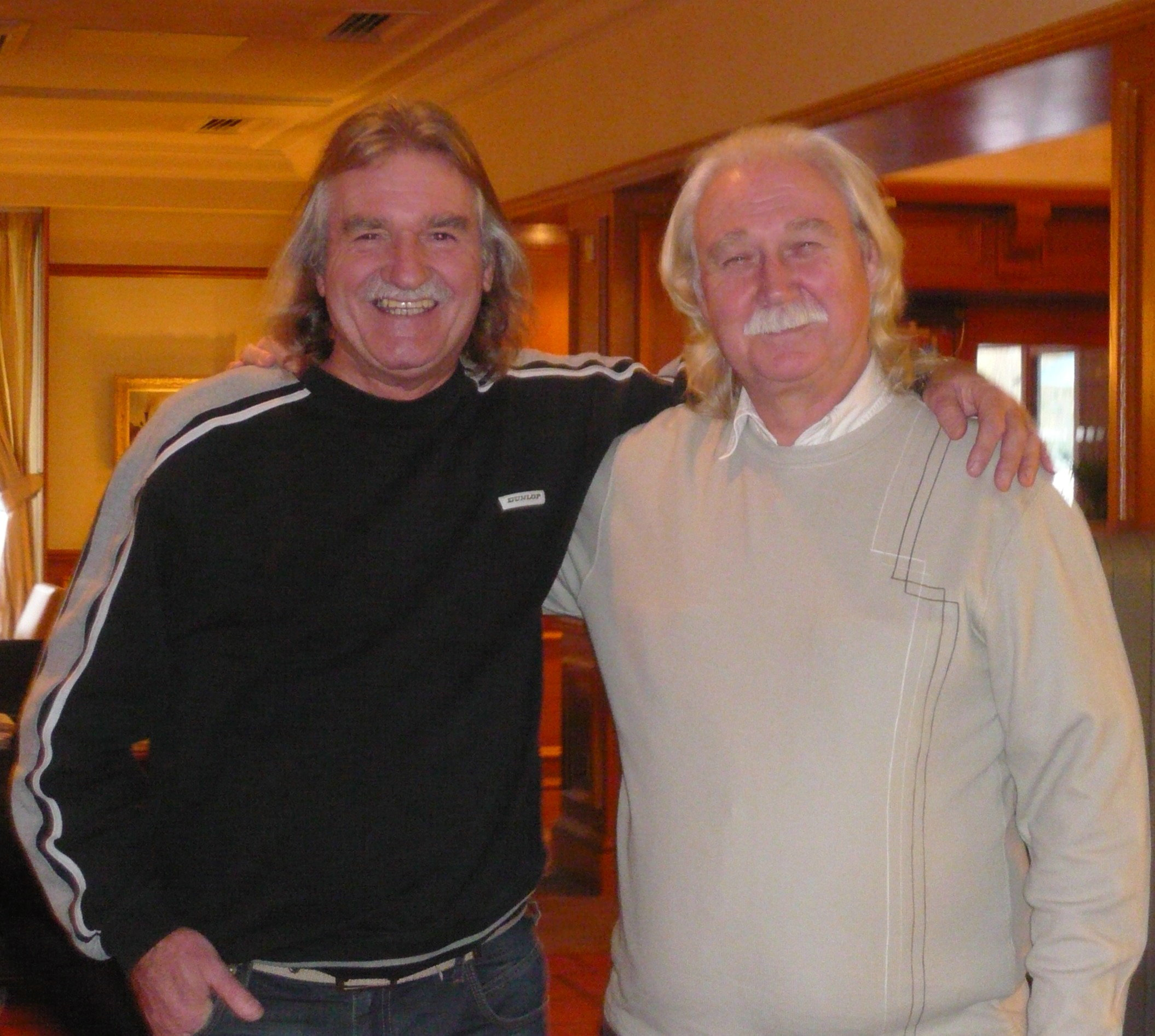
Keith Law and Frank Wilson, Maidstone 2009

During the years since Velvett Fogg's demise, demand amongst collectors for copies of their (now very rare) album has increased considerably. Original albums have changed hands for high prices with bootleg copies also known to be in circulation. In 2002, the Sanctuary Records Group re-issued the album officially for the first time on CD (CMRCD619).

Keith Law stayed in the music business, is still writing songs, and is now an entertainer in South West England. Frank Wilson, now performs with his band Run VT, and performs at venues in South East England. Keith Law and Frank Wilson are back together writing as Velvett Fogg Reloaded, and recording for a proposed new Velvett Fogg album.

== Discography ==
=== Albums ===
- Velvett Fogg

Releases

- LP, Pye Records (1969)
- CD, See for Miles (1989)
- CD, Castle Records/Sanctuary Records Group Ltd. (2003)
- LP, Akarma Records (Italy) (2007)

=== Singles ===
- "Telstar '69" / "Owed to the Dip" (1969)

=== Compilation appearances ===
- Pictures in the Sky, various artists - includes "Within' the Night" (Velvett Fogg) (Bam-Caruso Records, KIRI 083) (1988)
- Professor Jordan's Magic Sound Show, various artists - features "Lady Caroline" (Bam-Caruso Records, KIRI 098) (1988)
- Out of This World - Instrumental Diamonds Vol 3, various artists - features "Telstar '69" (Sequel Records, NEX CD 244) (1993)
- 2001: A Space Rock Odyssey: Classic Stoner Psychedelia from the Early 70's, various artists - features "Telstar '69" (Castle Records-Castle Music Ltd. [UK], CMDDD094 Sanctuary Records Group Ltd.) (2001)
- The Rubble Collection, Vol. 1-10 (box set), various artists, Volume 7 - includes "Within' the Night" (Velvett Fogg) (Past & Present Records) (2003)
- Pictures in the Sky, various artists - includes "Within' the Night" (Velvett Fogg) (Past and Present Records) (2003)
- Rare Trax Vol. 33 - Nine Miles High: British Psychedelia from the 60s and 70s, various artists - features "Come Away Melinda" (Rolling Stone [DEU] Records) (2004)
- Instro Hipsters Volume Five, various artists - features "Owed to the Dip" (Past & Present Records, PAPRCD2057) (2004)
- Maybe Someone Is Digging Underground - The Songs of the Bee Gees, various artists - features "New York Mining Disaster 1941" (Castle Music, CMQCD 963) (2005)
- Brumbeat: the Story of the 60s Midlands Sound, various artists, Disc 2 features "Wizard of Gobsolod" (Castle Records-Castle Music Ltd. [UK], CMEDD1146) (2006)
- Real Life Permanent Dreams: A Cornucopia of British Psychedelia 1965-1970, various artists - includes "Lady Caroline" (Castle Music Ltd. [UK], CMEDD1148, Sanctuary Records Group Ltd.) (2007)
- This Is Psychedelia, various artists - includes "Yellow Cave Woman" (Velvett Fogg) (Metro Records) (2007)
- Cave of Clear Light - The Pye & Dawn Records Underground Trip 1967 to 1975 (3CD set), various artists - includes "Yellow Cave Woman" (Velvett Fogg) (Pye/Esoteric [UK]) (2010)
