= Gigbeth =

Gigbeth is a music festival and conference held in Digbeth, Birmingham, England. First launched in March 2006, the festival was the creation of Birmingham-based producer, promoter, and performer Andy Bucknall. It is held annually on the first weekend in November. The festival has stages at different venues in the area including The Custard Factory and Digbeth Institute. The event is organised by Clare Edwards, winner of the 2008 Young Musical Entrepreneur of the Year. Gigbeth aims to support local musicians and to boost Birmingham's profile as a centre for music.

== Gigbeth 2006 ==
Dirty Pretty Things
The Raconteurs
Scott Matthews
The Twang
Nizlopi
Soweto Kinch
Orchestra of the Swan
DCS Bhangra
Shady Bard
Basil Gabbidon
Musical Youth

== Gigbeth 2007 ==
Nizlopi

Mr Hudson & The Library
Musical Youth
Achanak
Beardyman
Soweto Kinch
Orchestra of the Swan

== Gigbeth 2008 ==
The Sugarhill Gang
D:Ream
Stanton Warriors
Miles and Erica Hunt (The Wonder Stuff)
Oliver $
Guillemots
