= Avrocar (band) =

English electronica band

Avrocar was an electronica band from Birmingham, England. Band member Antony Harding has another more folk-oriented project called July Skies.

== Discography ==
- Cinematography
- Live at Ochre 7
- Guidance
- Against the Dying of the Light
- "Summer Blonde"
