= Singing Stewarts =

British Gospel music group

The Singing Stewarts were the first major British Gospel group. The five brothers and three sisters of the Stewart family were born in Trinidad and migrated to Handsworth in Birmingham in 1961. They were all members of the Seventh-day Adventist Church and under the training of their mother began to sing in an a cappella style songs that mixed traditional Southern gospel songs with Caribbean calypso.

In 1964 they were the subject of a TV documentary called The Colony produced by the BBC's Philip Donnellan and Radio Producer Charles Parker, which brought them to national attention, and in 1969 they were the first British gospel group to be recorded by a major record company when PYE Records released their album Oh Happy Day.
