= Moorish Delta 7 =

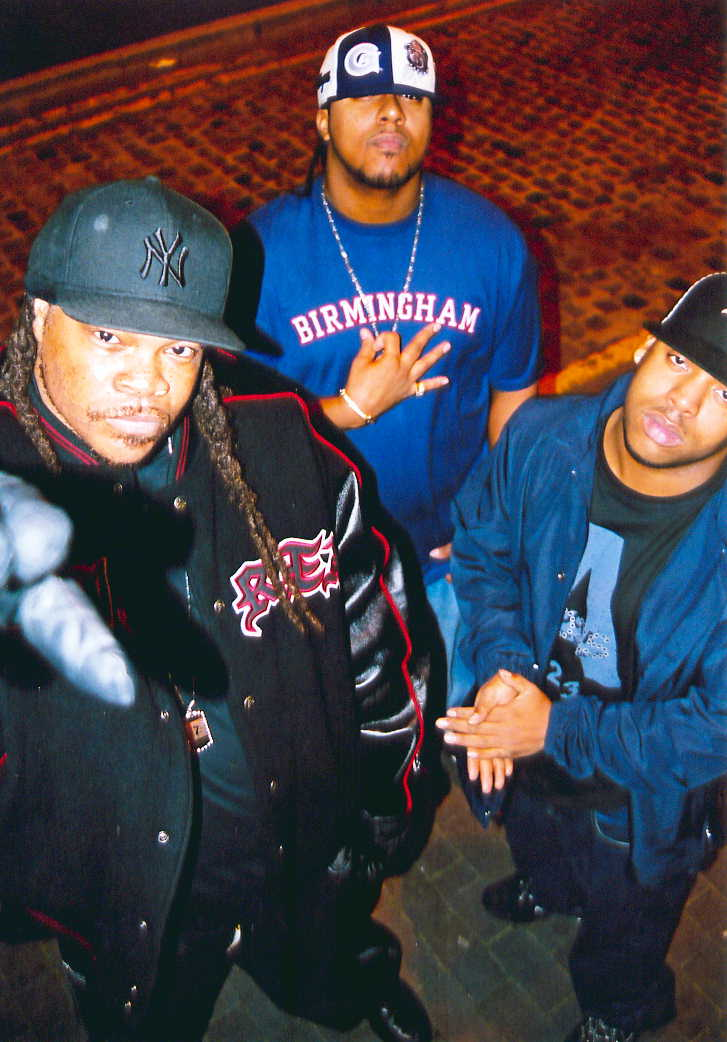
- From left to right: Cipher J.E.W.E.L.S, Jawar, and Malik

Background information
- Also known as: MD7
- Origin: Birmingham, England
- Genres: Hip hop
- Years active: 1995–present
- Labels: Seven Entertainment
- Members: Cipher J.E.W.E.L.S; Jawar; Malik
- Website: www.moorishdelta7.com

Moorish Delta 7 (also known as MD7) is a hip-hop/UK garage outfit from the Newtown area of Birmingham, England. The trio was formed in 1995 and has sold over 50,000 records.

== History ==
The group formed in 1995 as a growth of the then-large rap outfit Lyric Born Clique. Lyric Born Clique was an eight-piece rap collective featuring among many Golden Child, DJ Kingstun, Shortnerve, and Rawality. Initially, Moorish Delta 7 had four members with Shortnerve leaving shortly after the first EP. Their first release as 'Moorish Delta 7' was an EP on Quartz Records (another Birmingham record label) called Taking Four Wicked Heads on the Way to North Africa. The EP was a mixture of dark beats, insightful lyrics, street imagery, humour and political commentary. The group quickly became known for their high energy performances and quickly became popular with audiences in the UK.

Their next release was the 4 track single "The Art of Survival"/"Silent Screams"/"Number 1 Sound"/"Status" in 2001. The group had now evolved their music to include vivid cinematic soundscapes and continued to mix their subject matter switching from social commentary to humour with equal effect.

Influential figures in the Midlands hip-hop scene, they collaborated with a lot of local artists such as Shimm 1, Hoods Underground, Yogi, Big V, Law, Baby J, Shade 1 who among others formed the collective called Underworld.

Members of the group have now diverged into different areas with Cipher now producing for many different artists and Malik establishing a successful solo career collaborating with Amy Winehouse, Mark Ronson and others.

They have performed alongside DMX, Africa Bambaataa, Guru (Gang Star), Fabulous, Rodney P, 57th Dynasty, Out Da Ville, Mobb Deep, Estelle, DJ 279, Tim Westwood, Brother Ben, Immortal Technique, So Solid Crew, MSI Asylum, Pentalk, Mike GLC, Skinny Man, De La Soul, Royalists, Chubby Kids, Lyric L, Shabbazz the Disciple, Poetic, Freestyle, The Gravediggazz, The A Alikes, Fallacy, Blind Alphabets, Big Daddy Kane, Marley Marl, Jurassic Five, Roc 1, Tiny presents, Graf, BS5, C.O.V, Tubby T, The Villains, Bassman, Heartless Crew, Benjamin Zephaniah, Nicky Blackmarket, Ras Kwame, DJ Semtex, Big P and Skeme, amongst others.

In March 2008, the group collaborated with folk musician Seth Lakeman in a joint BBC and Arts Council England project. A programme named Made in England – Seth Lakeman, directed by Will Sergeant and broadcast on 23 April 2008 on BBC One, followed Seth and Moorish Delta 7 for 48 hours as they produced two records called "Find Your Way" and "Climate Change", which they performed live at The Concrete Bar in the Jewellery Quarter. The program which was made consequently won best regional documentary at the National TV Society awards in November 2008. It also provided a background into the work of the two musical outfits.

== Members ==
- Cipher J.E.W.E.L.S – also known as Knowledge Scientific (circa 1998)
- Malik
- Jawar

== Discography ==
=== Albums ===
- The Power & the Glory (2002)
- Life in the City (2006)

=== EPs ===
- Taking Four Wicked Heads on the Way to North Africa (1998)

=== Compilations ===
- The Experiment Vol. 1 (1998)
- Black Samurai Vol. 1 (1999)
- Black Samurai Vol. 2 (1999)
- UK Hip Hop Awards (Album) 2000
- Tim Westwood Compilation (Trust the DJ) 2000
- Underworld Compilation (2004)

=== Videos ===
Their first music video, "The Art of Survival", was one of the earliest MTV playlisted UK rap videos and set the tone for gritty, street related videos to come later.

- "Silent Screams" (2002)
- "Death Before Dishonour" (2002)
- "Don't Leave Me Lonely" (2003)
- "The Rain" (2005)
- "My Girl" (2006)
- "Levels" (2006)
- "Bootlegger" (2006)
- (Malik) "So Real" (2007)
- (Malik) "Blues Ground" (2007)
