= Steve Winwood discography =

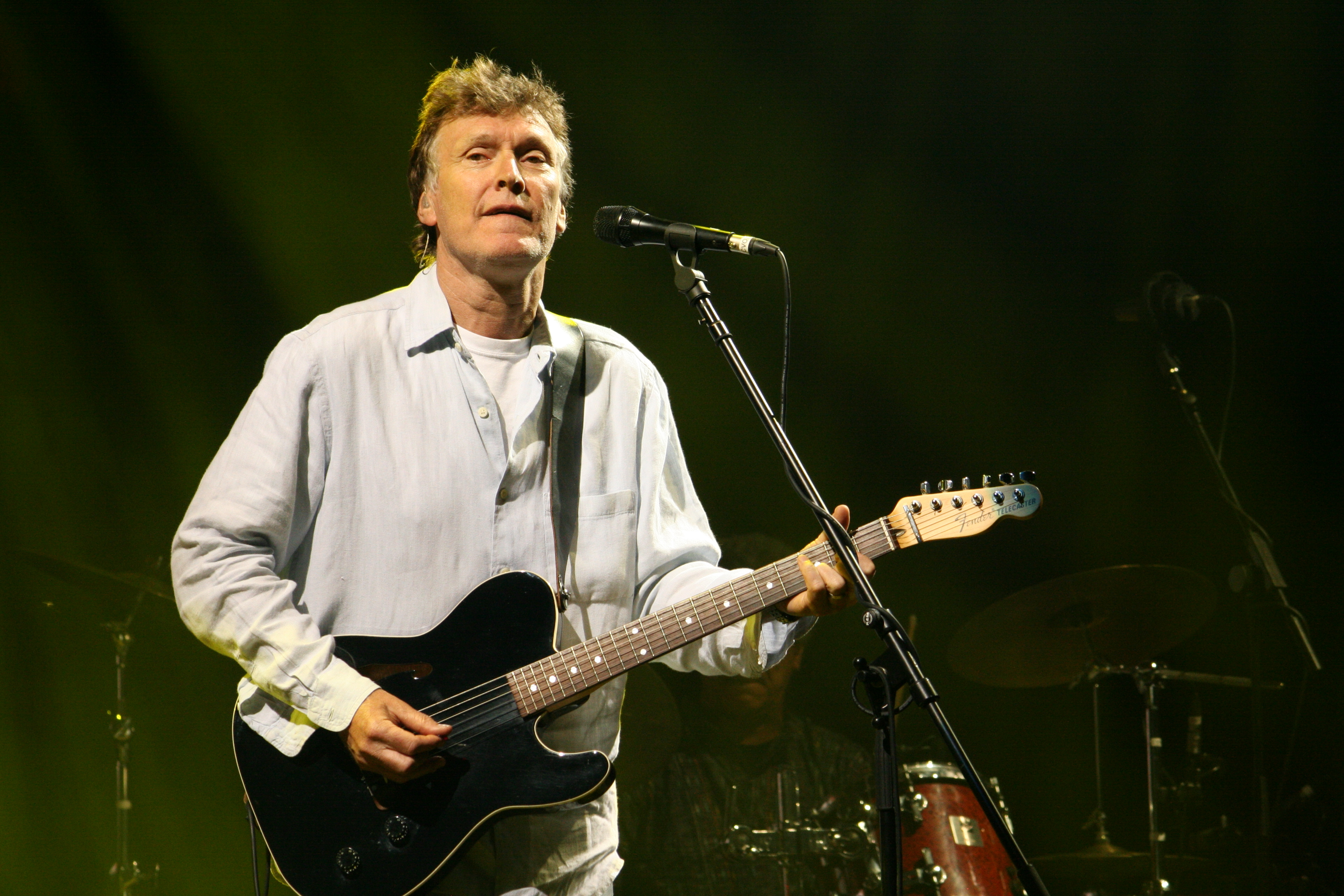
- Winwood in 2009
- Studio albums: 9
- Soundtrack albums: 2
- Live albums: 2
- Compilation albums: 9
- Singles: 29
- Video albums: 2
- Promotional singles: 15

The solo discography of Steve Winwood, a British rock artist, consists of nine studio albums, two live albums, nine compilation albums, and twenty-nine singles. After performing in various bands including the Spencer Davis Group, Traffic, Blind Faith, Ginger Baker's Air Force and Go, he launched a solo career in 1977.

Winwood's self-titled debut album was released on Island Records in June 1977. Although the album peaked at No. 12 in the United Kingdom and in the Top 40 in the United States, its singles failed to gain success in either country. His second album Arc of a Diver was issued in December 1980, and was certified Platinum in the United States and Silver in the United Kingdom. Its first track, "While You See a Chance", became a major hit in the United States, reaching No. 7 on the Billboard Hot 100. His 1982 follow-up album Talking Back to the Night did not produce any hits in the United States. However, its lead single "Still in the Game" reached No. 19 on the Canadian Singles Chart, and the second single, "Valerie", charted at No. 13 on the Mainstream Rock Tracks chart.

Back in the High Life (1986) was aimed more towards pop music, selling three million copies in the United States. The single "Higher Love" (taken from the album) became Winwood's first number one hit on the Billboard Hot 100 and Canadian Singles Chart, while also peaking at No. 13 on the UK Singles Chart. "Freedom Overspill", "Back in the High Life Again" and "The Finer Things" became major hits in the United States between 1986 and 1987. His fifth album Roll with It was released on Virgin Records in 1988, with the title track released as the lead single. That song became Winwood's second number one single on the Canadian Singles Chart and the Billboard Hot 100. However, it only became a minor hit in the United Kingdom, reaching No. 53. "Don't You Know What the Night Can Do?" and "Holding On" both became major hits on the Hot 100 and Hot Adult Contemporary Tracks chart in 1988. Refugees of the Heart (1990) contained more soul-inspired elements, debuting at No. 26 on the UK Albums Chart and No. 27 on the Billboard 200. Although its first single "One and Only Man" was only a minor UK hit, it reached No. 5 in Canada and No. 18 in the United States.

Winwood released his next album, Junction Seven, in 1997, which gained mixed reviews and had less success. It was followed by 2003's About Time and 2008's Nine Lives. According to the Recording Industry Association of America, he has sold over 7 million records in the United States alone.

== Albums ==
=== Studio albums ===
Title	Album details	Peak chart positions										Certifications
Title	Album details	UK	AUS	CAN	GER	JPN	NL	NZ	SWE	SWI	US	Certifications
Steve Winwood	Released: June 1977; Label: Island; Formats: LP, MC, 8-track	12	78	—	—	95	—	—	—	—	22	
Arc of a Diver	Released: 29 December 1980; Label: Island; Formats: LP, MC, 8-track	13	5	1	26	—	6	3	33	—	3	UK: Silver; CAN: Platinum; NZ: Gold; US: Platinum
Talking Back to the Night	Released: 2 August 1982; Label: Island; Formats: LP, MC	6	21	12	9	66	9	19	17	—	28	CAN: Gold
Back in the High Life	Released: 30 June 1986; Label: Island; Formats: CD, LP, MC	8	11	6	18	46	15	14	11	12	3	UK: Gold; NZ: Gold; US: 3× Platinum
Roll with It	Released: 20 June 1988; Label: Virgin; Formats: CD, LP, MC	4	16	3	7	42	21	16	3	4	1	UK: Gold; CAN: 2× Platinum; SWE: Gold; US: 2× Platinum
Refugees of the Heart	Released: 5 November 1990; Label: Virgin; Formats: CD, LP, MC	26	45	23	25	88	58	—	19	27	27	CAN: Gold; US: Gold
Junction Seven	Released: 2 June 1997; Label: Virgin; Formats: CD, HDCD, MC	32	137	—	15	60	—	—	55	38	123	
About Time	Released: 17 June 2003; Label: Wincraft Music; Formats: CD	97	—	—	37	174	—	—	—	—	126	
Nine Lives	Released: 29 April 2008; Label: Columbia; Formats: CD, 2×LP	31	—	—	22	—	51	34	—	74	12	
"—" denotes releases that did not chart or were not released in that territory.

=== Live albums ===
Title	Album details	Peak chart positions								Certifications
Title	Album details	UK	AUT	GER	IT	NL	SWE	SWI	US	Certifications
Live from Madison Square Garden (with Eric Clapton)	Released: 15 May 2009; Label: Reprise/Duck; Formats: 2×CD, 3×LP, digital download	40	25	8	13	60	44	33	14	GER: Gold
Greatest Hits Live	Released: 1 September 2017; Label: Wincraft Music; Formats: 2×CD, 4×LP, digital download	34	42	30	—	158	—	64	62	
"—" denotes releases that did not chart.

=== Compilation albums ===
Title	Album details	Peak chart positions								Certifications
Title	Album details	UK	AUS	CAN	GER	IT	JPN	NZ	US	Certifications
Winwood	Released: May 1971; Label: United Artists; Formats: LP, reel-to-reel; US-only release	—	—	—	—	—	—	—	93	
Chronicles	Released: 26 October 1987; Label: Island; Formats: CD, LP, MC	12	32	21	—	—	65	19	26	UK: Gold; NZ: Gold; US: Platinum
Keep On Running	Released: June 1991; Label: Island; Formats: CD, LP, MC	—	141	—	—	—	—	—	—	
The Finer Things	Released: 21 March 1995; Label: Island; Formats: 4×CD, 4×MC; US-only release	—	—	—	—	—	—	—	—	
20th Century Masters – The Millennium Collection: The Best of Steve Winwood	Released: 19 October 1999; Label: Island; Formats: CD; US-only release	—	—	—	—	—	—	—	—	
The Ultimate Collection	Released: August 2005; Label: Universal; Formats: 3×CD; Netherlands-only release	—	—	—	—	—	—	—	—	
The Island Years 1977–1986	Released: April 2007; Label: Island; Formats: 4×CD; Japan-only release	—	—	—	—	—	—	—	—	
Revolutions – The Very Best of Steve Winwood	Released: 7 June 2010; Label: Island/Wincraft Music; Formats: CD, digital download	11	—	—	33	78	—	—	—	UK: Gold
Icon	Released: 21 June 2011; Label: Island; Formats: CD	—	—	—	—	—	—	—	—	
"—" denotes releases that did not chart or were not released in that territory.

=== Video albums ===
Title	Album details	Certifications
Soundstage Presents Steve Winwood Live in Concert	Released: 2004; Label: Black Hill Pictures; Formats: DVD	
Live from Madison Square Garden (with Eric Clapton)	Released: 15 May 2009; Label: Reprise, Duck; Formats: 2×DVD, 2×Blu-ray	GER: Gold; US: 2× Platinum

== Singles ==
Title	Year	Peak chart positions										Album
Title	Year	UK	AUS	BEL (FL)	CAN	GER	NL	NZ	US	US AC	US Main	Album
"Time Is Running Out"	1977	—	—	—	—	—	—	—	—	—	—	Steve Winwood
"While You See a Chance"	1980	45	16	8	3	—	21	28	7	17	2	Arc of a Diver
"Spanish Dancer"	1981	—	—	—	—	—	—	—	—	—	—	Arc of a Diver
"Night Train"	1981	—	—	26	—	—	42	24	104	—	—	Arc of a Diver
"Arc of a Diver" (Note: "Arc of a Diver" was only released as a single in the US and Canada.)	1981	—	—	—	19	—	—	—	48	—	11	Arc of a Diver
"There's a River"	1981	—	—	—	—	—	—	—	—	—	—	Talking Back to the Night
"Still in the Game"	1982	—	90	24	19	—	29	—	47	—	8	Talking Back to the Night
"Valerie"	1982	51	98	—	34	—	—	—	70	—	13	Talking Back to the Night
"Your Silence Is Your Song"	1983	112	—	—	—	—	—	—	—	—	—	They Call It an Accident (soundtrack)
"Higher Love"	1986	13	8	31	1	49	26	11	1	7	1	Back in the High Life
"Freedom Overspill"	1986	69	—	—	39	—	—	—	20	—	4	Back in the High Life
"Back in the High Life Again"	1986	53	87	18	45	—	61	—	13	1	19	Back in the High Life
"The Finer Things" (Note: "The Finer Things" was only released as a single in the US, Canada, Australia, Japan and Continental Europe.)	1987	—	55	—	25	—	—	—	8	1	5	Back in the High Life
"Valerie" (remix)	1987	19	19	—	17	—	—	41	9	2	13	Chronicles
"Talking Back to the Night" (remix) (Note: "Talking Back to the Night" was only released as a single in the US, Canada and Australia.)	1988	—	—	—	92	—	—	—	57	7	17	Chronicles
"Roll with It"	1988	53	36	—	1	53	81	30	1	1	1	Roll with It
"Don't You Know What the Night Can Do?"	1988	89	94	—	2	—	—	46	6	2	1	Roll with It
"Holding On"	1988	—	—	—	3	—	—	—	11	1	2	Roll with It
"Hearts On Fire" (Note: "Hearts on Fire" was only released as a single in the US, Canada and Japan.)	1989	—	—	—	41	—	—	—	53	22	22	Roll with It
"One and Only Man"	1990	87	100	—	3	70	50	—	18	9	1	Refugees of the Heart
"I Will Be Here"	1991	96	121	—	76	—	—	—	—	40	—	Refugees of the Heart
"Reach for the Light" (Note: "Reach for the Light" was only released as a single in the US and Australia.)	1995	—	—	—	—	—	—	—	—	29	—	Balto (soundtrack)
"Spy in the House of Love"	1997	88	—	—	53	86	—	—	—	—	—	Junction Seven
"Gotta Get Back to My Baby" (Note: "Gotta Get Back to My Baby" was only released as a single in Continental Europe. It was also released promotionally in the UK.)	1997	—	—	—	—	89	—	—	—	—	—	Junction Seven
"Why Can't We Live Together?"	2003	—	—	—	—	—	—	—	—	—	—	About Time
"Different Light"	2003	—	—	—	—	—	—	—	—	—	—	About Time
"Spanish Dancer 2010"	2010	—	—	—	—	—	—	—	—	—	—	Revolutions – The Very Best of Steve Winwood
"Higher Love" (with Lily Winwood)	2016	—	—	—	—	—	—	—	—	—	—	Non-album singles
"Range Rover" (Ben Rector featuring Steve Winwood)	2021	—	—	—	—	—	—	—	—	—	—	Non-album singles
"—" denotes releases that did not chart or were not released in that territory.

=== Promotional singles ===
Title	Year	Peak chart positions	Album
Title	Year	US Main	Album
"Midland Maniac" (Note: Only released as a promotional single in Spain.)	1977	—	Steve Winwood
"Split Decision" (Note: Only released as a promotional single in the US.)	1986	3	Back in the High Life
"Take It As It Comes" (Note: "Take It As It Comes" was released promotionally in the UK as an LP sampler. It charted in the US due to airplay.)	1986	33	Back in the High Life
"Wake Me Up on Judgment Day"	1986	—	Back in the High Life
"Put on Your Dancing Shoes"	1988	25	Roll with It
"Another Deal Goes Down"	1990	10	Refugees of the Heart
"In the Light of Day"	1991	—	Refugees of the Heart
"Every Day (Oh Lord)"	1991	—	Refugees of the Heart
"Angel of Mercy"	1997	—	Junction Seven
"Plenty Lovin'"	1997	—	Junction Seven
"Phoenix Rising"	2003	—	About Time
"Dirty City" (with Eric Clapton)	2008	—	Live from Madison Square Garden
"I'm Not Drowning"	2008	—	Nine Lives
"Fly"	2008	—	Nine Lives
"Can't Find My Way Home"	2017	—	Greatest Hits Live
"—" denotes releases that did not chart or were not released in that territory.

== Soundtracks ==
- 1982 – They Call It an Accident (Goldeneye Productions). French film about a woman dealing with the loss of her son to a medical mistake.
- 1986 – The High Life (ITV Granada). A television documentary about the 1985 Tour de France experience of Scottish bicycle racer Robert Millar (later known as Philippa York).

== Other appearances ==
Song	Year	Album
Hammond organ on "Voodoo Chile" by Jimi Hendrix Experience	1968	Electric Ladyland
"Burn Down the Mission" (with Phil Collins)	1991	Two Rooms: Celebrating the Songs of Elton John & Bernie Taupin
"Give It Up" (with Etta James)	1992	The Right Time
"It's All Right"	1994	A Tribute to Curtis Mayfield
"Christmas Is Now Drawing Near at Hand"	1997	A Very Special Christmas 3
"I'm Ready"	2002	Jools Holland's Big Band Rhythm & Blues
"Call on Me"	2004	Re-recorded voice sample of "Valerie"
"I Need Thee Every Hour" (with Ashley Cleveland)	2005	Men and Angels Say
"Makes Me Wanna Pray" (with Christina Aguilera)	2006	Back to Basics
"Ain't No Love" (with Sam Moore)	2006	Overnight Sensational
"When the World Gets Small" (with Gov't Mule)	2013	Shout!
"Fire in the Belly" (with Van Morrison)	2015	Duets: Re-working the Catalogue
"Range Rover" (with Ben Rector)	2021	Non-album single
