= Revolutions – The Very Best of Steve Winwood =

Revolutions

Compilation album by Steve Winwood
- Released: 7 June 2010
- Genre: Rock, blue-eyed soul
- Length: 4:53:25
- Label: Island, Universal

Steve Winwood chronology
| Live from Madison Square Garden (2009) | Revolutions (2010) | Greatest Hits Live (2017) |

Alternative cover
- Single Disc Cover

Revolutions – The Very Best of Steve Winwood is the sixth compilation album by Steve Winwood. The album includes music from Winwood's solo career, as well as groups with which he has performed, including the Spencer Davis Group, Traffic, and Blind Faith. The CD was released as a box set and a single disc. As of October 2014, the box set is out of print (but can be purchased digitally), while the single disc is still available. The songs "The Finer Things" and "Roll With It" are exclusive to the single disc version and cannot be found on the box set.

In addition the version of "The Low Spark of High-Heeled Boys" on both versions of this compilation is a different mix where various solos not on the original album version are heard. There is no indication of this on the album, but like other songs on the compilation, it is clearly different.

== Reception ==
Professional ratings
Review scores
| Source | Rating |
|---|---|
| AllMusic | 4/5 stars |

Stevie Chick from BBC Music writes: "the four-CD box-set version of Revolutions examines [Winwood's] back-catalogue in great depth, but a simultaneously released 16-track single-CD package is faultless."

== Track listing ==
=== 4 CD Box Set ===
==== Disc 1 ====
1. "Keep on Running" (Jackie Edwards) 2:49
2. "Somebody Help Me" (Edwards) 2:04
3. "Gimme Some Lovin'" (Spencer Davis, Steve Winwood, Muff Winwood) 2:58
4. "I'm a Man" (Jimmy Miller, Winwood) 2:57
5. "Paper Sun" (Jim Capaldi, Winwood) 4:16
6. "Coloured Rain" (Capaldi, Winwood, Chris Wood) 2:43
7. "No Face, No Name, No Number" (Capaldi, Winwood) 3:33
8. "Heaven Is in Your Mind" (Capaldi, Winwood, Wood) 4:18
9. "Smiling Phases" (Capaldi, Winwood, Wood) 2:43
10. "Dear Mr. Fantasy" (Capaldi, Winwood, Wood) 5:40
11. "Pearly Queen" (Capaldi, Winwood) 4:20
12. "40,000 Headmen" (Capaldi, Miller, Winwood) 3:16
13. "No Time to Live" (Capaldi, Winwood) 5:20
14. "Who Knows What Tomorrow May Bring" (Capaldi, Winwood, Wood) 3:15
15. "Shanghai Noodle Factory" (Capaldi, Larry Fallon, Dave Mason, Miller, Winwood, Wood) 5:04
16. "Medicated Goo" (Miller, Winwood) 3:37
17. "Withering Tree" (Capaldi, Winwood) 3:12
18. "Well All Right" (Jerry Allison, Buddy Holly, Joe B. Mauldin, Norman Petty) 4:28
19. "Can't Find My Way Home" (Winwood) 3:18
20. "Presence of the Lord" (Eric Clapton) 4:53
- Tracks 1–4 by The Spencer Davis Group
- Tracks 5–17 by Traffic
- Tracks 18–20 by Blind Faith

==== Disc 2 ====
1. "Stranger to Himself" (Capaldi, Winwood) 3:54
2. "John Barleycorn (Must Die)" (traditional-arr. Winwood) 6:24
3. "Glad" (Winwood) 7:02
4. "Freedom Rider" (Capaldi, Winwood) 5:29
5. "Empty Pages" (Capaldi, Winwood) 4:36
6. "The Low Spark of High-Heeled Boys" (Capaldi, Winwood) 12:27
7. "Rainmaker" (Capaldi, Winwood) 7:45
8. "Shoot Out at the Fantasy Factory" (Capaldi, Winwood) 6:03
9. "Something New" (Capaldi, Winwood) 3:57
10. "Walking in the Wind" (Capaldi, Winwood) 6:47
11. "When the Eagle Flies" (Capaldi, Winwood) 4:26
12. "Mozambique" (Capaldi, Winwood) 4:27

All tracks by Traffic

==== Disc 3 ====
1. "Vacant Chair" (Viv Stanshall, Winwood) 6:53
2. "While You See a Chance" (Will Jennings, Winwood) 5:16
3. "Arc of a Diver" (Stanshall, Winwood) 5:29
4. "Spanish Dancer" (Jennings, Winwood) 6:11
5. "Night Train" (Jennings, Winwood) 7:51
6. "Valerie" (Jennings, Winwood) 4:08
7. "Higher Love" (Jennings, Winwood) 5:49
8. "Freedom Overspill" (George Fleming, James Hooker, Winwood) 4:17
9. "Back in the High Life Again" (Jennings, Winwood) 4:23
10. "Don't You Know What the Night Can Do?" (Jennings, Winwood) 4:29
11. "Spy in the House of Love" (Capaldi, Narada Michael Walden, Winwood) 4:45
12. "Different Light" (Winwood) 6:40
13. "Dirty City (featuring Eric Clapton) (Peter Godwin, Winwood) 7:48

All tracks by Steve Winwood

==== Disc 4 ====
1. "This Hammer" (Davis, Winwood, Winwood, Pete York) 2:19
2. "Waltz for Lumumba" (Winwood) 4:19
3. "When I Come Home" (Edwards, Winwood) 1:58
4. "Love" (Capaldi, Winwood) 3:05
5. "In the Light of Day" (Jennings, Winwood) 9:43
6. "There's a River" (Jennings, Winwood) 4:43
7. "Hold On" (Capaldi, Winwood) 4:29
8. "The Morning Side" (Jennings, Winwood) 5:12
9. "Far From Home" (Capaldi, Winwood) 8:36
10. "Holy Ground" (Capaldi, Davy Spillane, Winwood) 7:50
11. "State of Grace" (Capaldi, Winwood) 7:18
12. "Why Can't We Live Together" (Timmy Thomas) 6:43
13. "Domingo Morning" (Jose Pires de Almeida Neto, Winwood) 5:10
- Tracks 1–3 by The Spencer Davis Group
- Tracks 4 and 9–11 by Traffic
- Tracks 5–8 and 12–13 by Steve Winwood

=== US Single CD version ===
1. The Spencer Davis Group - "Gimme Some Lovin" 2:57
2. The Spencer Davis Group - "I'm a Man" 2:57
3. Traffic - "40,000 Headmen" 3:16
4. Traffic - "No Face, No Name, No Number" 3:32
5. Traffic - "Dear Mr. Fantasy" 5:37
6. Traffic - "The Low Spark Of High-Heeled Boys" [Edit] 11:31
7. Traffic - "Glad" 7:01
8. Blind Faith - "Can't Find My Way Home" 3:17
9. Steve Winwood - "While You See a Chance" [Edit] 4:10
10. Steve Winwood - "Valerie" 4:07
11. Steve Winwood - "Spanish Dancer 2010" [Radio Edit] 3:30
12. Steve Winwood - "The Finer Things" [Edit] (Jennings, Winwood) 4:11
13. Steve Winwood - "Higher Love" 5:48
14. Steve Winwood - "Back in the High Life Again" 4:23
15. Steve Winwood - "Roll with It" [Edit] (Jennings, Winwood) 4:29
16. Steve Winwood - "Dirty City" (Featuring Eric Clapton) [Edit] 4:03
17. Steve Winwood - "Don't You Know What The Night Can Do?" [Edit] 4:29

=== UK Single CD version ===
1. The Spencer Davis Group - "Keep On Running" 2:48
2. The Spencer Davis Group - "Somebody Help Me" 2:04
3. The Spencer Davis Group - "Gimme Some Lovin'" 2:57
4. The Spencer Davis Group - "I'm A Man" 2:57
5. Traffic - "40,000 Headmen" 3:16
6. Traffic - "Paper Sun" 4:16
7. Traffic - "No Face, No Name, No Number" 3:33
8. Traffic - "Dear Mr. Fantasy" 5:39
9. Blind Faith - "Can't Find My Way Home" 3:17
10. Steve Winwood - "While You See a Chance" 5:16
11. Steve Winwood - "Valerie" 4:07
12. Steve Winwood - "Spanish Dancer 2010" 6:11
13. Steve Winwood - "Higher Love" 5:48
14. Steve Winwood - "Back in the High Life Again" 4:23
15. Steve Winwood - "Roll with It" (Jennings, Winwood) 5:18
16. Steve Winwood - "Dirty City" (Featuring Eric Clapton) 7.48

== Charts ==
| Chart (2010) | Peak position |
|---|---|
| German Albums (Offizielle Top 100) | 33 |
| Greek Albums (IFPI) | 25 |
| Italian Albums (FIMI) | 78 |
| Scottish Albums (OCC) | 16 |
| UK Albums (OCC) | 11 |

== Certifications ==
| Region | Certification | Certified units/sales |
|---|---|---|
| United Kingdom (BPI) | Gold | 100,000^{‡} |
^{‡} Sales+streaming figures based on certification alone.
