= Greatest Hits Live (Steve Winwood album) =

Live album by Steve Winwood
- Released: 1 September 2017
- Venue: Various
- Genres: Rock; blues; blues rock; blue-eyed soul; funk; jazz; pop
- Length: 150:38
- Label: Wincraft Music
- Producer: James Towler

Steve Winwood chronology
Revolutions (2010)	Greatest Hits Live (2017)

Professional ratings
Review scores
Source	Rating
AllMusic	3.5/5 stars
All About Jazz	4/5 stars
Classic Rock	7/10

Greatest Hits Live (officially titled Winwood: Greatest Hits Live) is a double CD and four-LP live album by English musician and songwriter Steve Winwood, released on 1 September 2017 by Winwood's own label, Wincraft Music, and distributed by Thirty Tigers. The live album is Winwood's first album in nearly a decade and is made up of recordings from his personal archives of live performances in the span of his career.

Winwood performed songs from his solo career, as well as selections from his time in the bands Blind Faith, Traffic, and the Spencer Davis Group, as well as some covers. His band consisted of Jose Neto on guitar, Richard Bailey on drums, Paul Booth on saxophone, flute and Hammond organ, and Edson "Cafe" da Silva on percussion, whereas Winwood also switches from guitar, mandolin and Hammond organ.

== Background and release ==
Speaking about the live album, Winwood says, "I'm excited about the release because I have recorded every show for many years and so it evoked many memories of the performances and reactions from the fans over the years who have supported me... I suppose it is sort of a tribute to the band members and crew I've been fortunate to have with me on the road. The songs were chosen for being the ones most recognized throughout my career which have left an impression and so I hope the record will be a souvenir that brings to mind happy memories of a good time experienced at one of my shows."

== Critical reception ==
Stephen Thomas Erlewine of AllMusic admits that although fans of Winwood "looking for by-the-record versions of his big tunes may be disappointed", he still praises the versatility of the live performances, stating that "the limber, flexible arrangements are appealing, the band is expert, and Winwood is in fine voice". Doug Collette of All About Jazz applauds Winwood as he "re-imagines the selections, not just by some healthy improv, but also by stylistic cross-pollination that indirectly references his lesser-known endeavors." Reviewing the live record for Classic Rock, Ewald Funk calls Winwood an "all-rounder", and calls the LP "An interesting introduction for newcomers, and a refresher of fond memories for contemporary witnesses."

== Track listing (CD) ==
Disc one
No.	Title	Music	Length
1.	"I'm a Man" (Live)	Jimmy Miller/Steve Winwood	6:00
2.	"Them Changes" (Live)	Buddy Miles	5:24
3.	"Fly" (Live)	Peter Godwin/Jose Neto/Steve Winwood	8:56
4.	"Can't Find My Way Home" (Live)	Steve Winwood	4:49
5.	"Had to Cry Today" (Live)	Steve Winwood	6:45
6.	"Low Spark of High Heeled Boys" (Live)	Jim Capaldi/Steve Winwood	8:02
7.	"Empty Pages" (Live)	Steve Winwood	6:18
8.	"Back in the High Life Again" (Live)	Will Jennings/Steve Winwood	8:15
9.	"Higher Love" (Live)	Will Jennings/Steve Winwood	7:09
10.	"Dear Mr. Fantasy" (Live)	Jim Capaldi/Steve Winwood/Chris Wood	8:44
11.	"Gimme Some Lovin'" (Live)	Spencer Davis/Muff Winwood/Steve Winwood	5:28

Disc two
No.	Title	Music	Length
1.	"Rainmaker" (Live)	Jim Capaldi/Steve Winwood	8:05
2.	"Pearly Queen" (Live)	Jim Capaldi/Steve Winwood	5:22
3.	"Glad" (Live)	Steve Winwood	6:32
4.	"Why Can't We Live Together"	Timmy Thomas	6:11
5.	"40,000 Headmen" (Live)	Jim Capaldi/Steve Winwood	4:38
6.	"Walking in the Wind" (Live)	Jim Capaldi/Steve Winwood	7:14
7.	"Medicated Goo" (Live)	Jimmy Miller/Steve Winwood	6:04
8.	"John Barleycorn" (Live)	Traditional/Steve Winwood	7:07
9.	"While You See a Chance" (Live)	Will Jennings/Steve Winwood	6:11
10.	"Arc of a Diver" (Live)	Viv Stanshall/Steve Winwood	6:09
11.	"Freedom Overspill" (Live)	George Fleming/James Hooker/Steve Winwood	5:29
12.	"Roll with It" (Live)	Lamont Dozier/Brian Holland/Eddie Holland/Will Jennings/Steve Winwood	5:46

== Track listing (LP) ==
=== Side one ===
1. "I'm a Man" (Live)
2. "Them Changes" (Live)
3. "Fly" (Live)

=== Side two ===
1. "Can't Find My Way Home" (Live)
2. "Had to Cry Today" (Live)
3. "Low Spark of High Heeled Boys" (Live)

=== Side three ===
1. "Empty Pages" (Live)
2. "Back in the High Life Again" (Live)
3. "Higher Love" (Live)

=== Side four ===
1. "Dear Mr. Fantasy" (Live)
2. "Gimme Some Lovin'" (Live)

=== Side five ===
1. "Rainmaker" (Live)
2. "Pearly Queen" (Live)
3. "Glad" (Live)

=== Side six ===
1. "Why Can't We Live Together"
2. "40,000 Headmen" (Live)
3. "Walking in the Wind" (Live)

=== Side seven ===
1. "Medicated Goo" (Live)
2. "John Barleycorn" (Live)
3. "While You See a Chance" (Live)

=== Side eight ===
1. "Arc of a Diver" (Live)
2. "Freedom Overspill" (Live)
3. "Roll with It" (Live)

== Personnel ==
- Steve Winwood – vocals, guitar, mandolin, keyboards
- Jose Neto – guitar
- Richard Bailey – drums
- Paul Booth – saxophone, flute, keyboards, backing vocals
- Edson "Cafe" da Silva – percussion

== Charts ==
Chart (2017)	Peak position
Austrian Albums (Ö3 Austria)	42
Belgian Albums (Ultratop Flanders)	98
Belgian Albums (Ultratop Wallonia)	150
German Albums (Offizielle Top 100)	30
Dutch Albums (Album Top 100)	158
Scottish Albums (OCC)	26
Swiss Albums (Schweizer Hitparade)	64
UK Albums (OCC)	34
UK Americana Albums (Official Charts)	3
UK Independent Albums (Official Charts)	9
US Billboard 200	62
