= Chronicles (Steve Winwood album) =

Compilation album by Steve Winwood
- Released: 26 October 1987
- Recorded: 1977–1987
- Genres: Rock, blue-eyed soul, pop
- Length: 46:48
- Label: Island
- Producers: Steve Winwood, Tom Lord-Alge

Steve Winwood chronology
Back in the High Life (1986)	Chronicles (1987)	Roll with It (1988)

Professional ratings
Review scores
Source	Rating
Allmusic	4.5/5 stars
Christgau's Record Guide: The '80s	C+
New Musical Express	7/10

Chronicles is the first compilation album by Steve Winwood as a solo artist. The album contains some of his major hits up to this point and new remixes produced by Tom Lord-Alge, who had helped commercialize Winwood's sound on his previous album, Back in the High Life. One track, "Valerie", was originally released as a single for Winwood's 1982 album, Talking Back to the Night. Despite the original single being a commercial flop, the remix of the song included in this album peaked at No. 9 on the US charts and No. 19 in the UK. The album peaked at No. 26 on the Billboard 200 album chart and No. 12 in the UK.

It was Winwood's last release with Island Records, before his departure to Virgin Records.

== Track listing ==
All tracks are written by Steve Winwood and Will Jennings, unless otherwise noted

No.	Title	Writer(s)	Album	Length
1.	"Wake Me Up on Judgement Day"		Back in the High Life	5:42
2.	"While You See a Chance"		edited from Arc of a Diver	4:02
3.	"Vacant Chair"	Steve Winwood, Vivian Stanshall	edited from Steve Winwood	4:31
4.	"Help Me Angel" (Remix)		Original version on Talking Back to the Night	5:03
5.	"My Love's Leavin'"	Steve Winwood, Vivian Stanshall	Back in the High Life	5:12
6.	"Valerie" (Remix)		Original version on Talking Back to the Night	4:05
7.	"Arc of a Diver"	Steve Winwood, Vivian Stanshall	Arc of a Diver	5:25
8.	"Higher Love"		Edited from Back in the High Life	4:07
9.	"Spanish Dancer"		Arc of a Diver	4:35
10.	"Talking Back to the Night" (Remix)		Original version on Talking Back to the Night	4:06
Total length:				46:48

- 2, 3, 8, 9 & 10 are edited on vinyl editions (edit lengths shown above); CD/digital include full-length versions.
- 4, 6 & 10 are remixed by Tom Lord-Alge for this release.

== Charts ==
=== Weekly charts ===
Chart (1987–88)	Peak position
Australian Albums (Kent Music Report)	32
Canada Top Albums/CDs (RPM)	21
Japanese Albums (Oricon)	66
New Zealand Albums (RMNZ)	19
UK Albums (Official Charts)	12
US Billboard 200	26

=== Year-end charts ===
Chart (1988)	Peak position
US Billboard 200	91

== Certifications ==
Region	Certification	Certified units/sales
New Zealand (RMNZ)	Gold	7,500^{^}
United Kingdom (BPI)	Gold	100,000^{^}
United States (RIAA)	Platinum	1,000,000^{^}
^{^} Shipments figures based on certification alone.
