= Winwood =

Winwood is a British surname. Notable people with the surname include:

- Estelle Winwood (1883–1984), British actress
- Muff Winwood (born 1943), British musician and record company executive, brother of Steve Winwood
- Ralph Winwood (c. 1562–1617), British politician and diplomat
- Steve Winwood (born 1948), British musician
  - Winwood (album), a 1972 compilation album featuring the music of Steve Winwood
- Winwood, the fictional main character of the game Fate: Gates of Dawn

== See also ==
- Wynwood, a neighborhood in Miami, Florida
- Wynnewood (disambiguation)
- Wynnwood, on the National Register of Historic Places listings in Muscogee County, Georgia
