= Junction Seven =

Studio album by Steve Winwood
- Released: 2 June 1997
- Recorded: 1996
- Studio: Netherturkdonic Studios (Gloucestershire, England, UK); Tarpan Studios (San Rafael, California, USA); A&M Studios (Hollywood, California, USA); LeCrib Studios (Westport, Connecticut, USA)
- Genre: Funk
- Length: 57:36
- Label: Virgin
- Producer: Steve Winwood; Narada Michael Walden

Steve Winwood chronology
Refugees of the Heart (1990)	Junction Seven (1997)	About Time (2003)

Singles from Junction Seven
- 1. "Spy in the House of Love" Released: 1997; 2. "Gotta Get Back to My Baby" Released: 1997

Professional ratings
Review scores
Source	Rating
Uncut	1/5 stars

Junction Seven is the seventh solo studio album by the English musician and songwriter Steve Winwood, released in June 1997. The album broke the Top 40 in the UK but did not sell well in the US, and Winwood took a six-year break from making solo albums (returning in 2003 with About Time). This album was co-produced with Narada Michael Walden, while Winwood's wife Eugenia co-wrote several songs. Des'ree provided vocals on 'Plenty Lovin'.

Junction 7 is the nearest motorway junction to Winwood's childhood home, at Great Barr, Birmingham.

== Track listing ==
1. "Spy in the House of Love" (Winwood, Narada Michael Walden, Jim Capaldi) – 4:46
2. "Angel of Mercy" (Winwood, Walden, Capaldi) – 5:02
3. "Just Wanna Have Some Fun" (Winwood, Walden) – 4:57
4. "Let Your Love Come Down" (Winwood, Walden, Eugenia Winwood, Capaldi) – 5:48
5. "Real Love" (Winwood, Walden, Eugenia Winwood) – 5:21
6. "Fill Me Up" (Winwood, Eugenia Winwood) – 4:27
7. "Gotta Get Back to My Baby" (Winwood, Eugenia Winwood) – 4:52
8. "Someone Like You" (Winwood, Walden, Eugenia Winwood) – 4:39
9. "Family Affair" (Sylvester Stewart) – 5:17
10. "Plenty Lovin'" (Winwood, Walden) – 5:57
11. "Lord of the Street" (Winwood, Walden, Capaldi) – 5:26

== Personnel ==
- Steve Winwood – lead vocals, rhythm guitar (1, 10, 11), guitar solos (1), Wurlitzer electric piano (2), Hammond B3 organ (2, 3, 11), wah wah guitar solo (2), clavinet (3, 11), synth sax solo (3), organ (4), lead guitar (4), acoustic piano (5, 9, 11), acoustic guitar (6), additional keyboards (7), claves (7), horn arrangements (7), percussion (9)
- Michael McEvoy – additional keyboards (1, 2, 5), voice (2), synth vibes (4), additional acoustic piano (4), bass (5, 6), keyboards (6, 8), dobro (6), drum programming (6, 8), synth strings (8, 10), bass programming (8)
- Narada Michael Walden – keyboards (1, 3, 5, 8–10), bass (1, 3, 8), drums (1, 9, 11), drum programming (1–6, 8, 9, 11), Hammond B3 bass (2), percussion (2, 3, 5, 9, 11), synthesizers (3, 11), organ (4), cymbals (8), synth bass (9)
- Frank Martin – keyboards (3–5, 11), programming (3–5, 11), bass (5)
- Rebeca Mauleón-Santana – acoustic piano (7), horn arrangements (7)
- Jimi Fischer – wah wah guitar (1), additional drum programming (2), additional acoustic piano (4), additional bass (4)
- Vernon "Ice" Black – guitar (3)
- Lenny Kravitz – guitar (4)
- Nile Rodgers – guitar (9)
- José Neto – acoustic guitar, nylon electric guitar (10), guitar solo (10)
- Marc Van Wageningen – bass (7)
- Myron Dove – electric bass (9)
- Gary Brown – electric bass (10)
- Gigi Gonaway – percussion (1), MIDI drums (11)
- Walfredo Reyes Jr. – percussion (3, 4, 7, 11), drums (7)
- Walfredo Reyes Sr. – percussion (7), timbales (7)
- Daniel Reyes – congas (7)
- Jerry Hey – string arrangements and conductor (2, 5, 9), trumpet (3, 4), horn arrangements (3, 4)
- Nathan Rubin – concertmaster (2, 5, 9)
- Marc Russo – saxophones (3, 4)
- Melecio Magdaluyo – saxophones (7)
- Wayne Wallace – trombone (3, 4)
- Jeff Cressman – trombone (7)
- Louis Fasman – trumpet (7)
- Bill Ortiz – trumpet (7)
- Nikita Germaine – backing vocals (1–4, 7, 9, 11)
- Tina Gibson – backing vocals (1–4, 7, 9, 11)
- Skyler Jett – backing vocals (1–3, 7, 9, 11)
- Tony Lindsey – backing vocals (1–3, 7, 9)
- Annie Stocking – backing vocals (1–4, 7, 9, 11)
- Sandy Griffith – backing vocals (4, 8)
- Claytoven Richardson – backing vocals (4, 8)
- Simone Sauphanor – backing vocals (6, 7)
- Ruby Turner – backing vocals (6, 7)
- Eugenia Winwood – spoken word (6)
- Des'ree – lead vocals (10)

Party People on "Gotta Get Back To My Baby"

- Nikita Germaine, Tina Gibson, Skyler Jett, Tony Lindsey and Annie Stocking

== Production ==
- Steve Winwood – producer, arrangements
- Narada Michael Walden – producer, arrangements
- David Frazer – recording, mixing
- Mick Dolan – second engineer
- Jeff Gray – assistant engineer (1–4, 7, 11), MIDI technician (1–4, 7, 11)
- Andy Davies – studio assistant at Netherturkdonic Studios
- Marc "Elvis" Reyburn – additional engineer (3, 9)
- Jim Labinski – additional engineer (4)
- Gary Tole – additional engineer (9)
- Ted Jensen – mastering at Sterling Sound (New York City, New York, USA)
- Tony DeFranco – production administrator
- Shiloh Hobel – production coordinator
- Janice Lee – production coordinator
- Cherice Miller – production coordinator
- Kevin Walden – production coordinator
- Eugenia Winwood – creative director, project manager
- Annie Leibovitz – photography
- Viv Phillips – personal assistant to Steve Winwood
- Mick Newton – management
- Ron Weisner – management

== Charts ==
Chart (1997)	Peak position
Belgian Albums (Ultratop Flanders)	42
German Albums (Offizielle Top 100)	15
Japanese Albums (Oricon)	60
Scottish Albums (OCC)	50
Swedish Albums (Sverigetopplistan)	55
Swiss Albums (Schweizer Hitparade)	38
UK Albums (OCC)	32
US Billboard 200	123
