= Wynnewood =

Wynnewood may refer to several places in the United States:

- Wynnewood, Oklahoma
- Wynnewood, Pennsylvania
- Wynnewood (Tennessee), the largest existing log structure in Tennessee
- Wynnewood, Dallas, Texas, a neighborhood

== See also ==
- Winwood (disambiguation)
- Wynwood, a neighborhood in Miami, Florida
- Wynnwood, on the National Register of Historic Places listings in Muscogee County, Georgia
