= Live from Madison Square Garden (Eric Clapton and Steve Winwood album) =

Live album by Eric Clapton & Steve Winwood
- Released: 19 May 2009
- Recorded: 25–28 February 2008
- Venue: Madison Square Garden, New York City, New York
- Genre: Blues rock; rock; blues
- Length: 129:09
- Label: Duck / Reprise
- Producer: James Pluta, John McDermott, Scooter Weintraub

Eric Clapton chronology
Complete Clapton (2007)	Live from Madison Square Garden (2009)	Clapton (2010)

Steve Winwood chronology
Nine Lives (2008)	Live from Madison Square Garden (2009)	Revolutions (2010)

Professional ratings
Review scores
Source	Rating
Allmusic	3.5/5 stars

Live from Madison Square Garden is a double CD and DVD live album by Eric Clapton and Steve Winwood, which was released on 19 May 2009 by Duck / Reprise Records. The album is made up of recordings from Clapton and Winwood's performances at Madison Square Garden in February 2008. It is Clapton's ninth live album and Winwood's first live album as a solo artist.

The duo performed songs from their time in the band Blind Faith as well as selections from Traffic, Derek and the Dominos, Clapton's and Winwood's solo careers and some rock and blues covers. Their band consisted of Willie Weeks on bass, Ian Thomas on drums and Chris Stainton on keyboards.

== Background ==
Winwood and Clapton first crossed musical paths as members of the one-off group Eric Clapton and the Powerhouse in March 1966. They recorded songs issued on the Elektra Records compilation album What's Shakin'. Later they teamed up again in 1969 with the formation of Blind Faith, shortly after Clapton had left Cream. Blind Faith pioneered the fusion of rock and blues into tremendous studio and stage success. Despite critical and popular acclaim, the band was short-lived with only one album and a brief 1969 tour that debuted 12 July at Madison Square Garden and ended 24 August in Hawaii. Since then, Winwood and Clapton have remained friends but had only performed together a few times over the years; an occasional song at a charity event. In 1998, they both appeared in the movie Blues Brothers 2000 as members of the fictional blues group, the Louisiana Gator Boys (Willie Weeks was also a member). During Clapton's 2007 Crossroads Guitar Festival, Clapton and Winwood played six songs together including a few Blind Faith songs. After that successful experience, the two decided to collaborate again. The 2008 Madison Square Garden shows were the first full Winwood-Clapton concerts in almost 40 years.

The night before Buddy Miles died, a friend called him on his cell phone so he could hear Winwood and Clapton perform his best known song "Them Changes". When they found out the next day that Miles had died, they dedicated the performance of the song to him.

== Tour ==
On 11 February 2009, the pair announced a 14-city US tour that kicked off on 10 June 2009 in East Rutherford, New Jersey. They were joined on stage by Chris Stainton (keyboards), Willie Weeks (bass), Abe Laboriel Jr. (drums), as well as backing vocalists Sharon White and Michelle John.

== Recording, production and artwork ==
Live from Madison Square Garden was recorded from 25 to 28 February. The shows were recorded and mixed by James Towler, while the production was handled by James Pluta, John McDermott, and Scooter Weintraub with executive production by John Beug, Michael Eaton, Peter Jackson, and Tom Whalley. Most of the production staff were also involved in the recordings for Clapton's Crossroads Guitar Festivals.

The art direction for the album and DVD was Ellen Wakayama with the design handled by Donny Phillips of the Tehachapi hardcore bands The Warriors and Machines, and photography by Danny Clinch. Phillips is one of the lead graphic designers at Warner Bros. Records, which the other two people mentioned also work for. The artwork was based on the taijitu, although the colours on the packaging were red and blue instead of black and white.

Some issues have an incorrect track listing for CD 1, in the booklet, as "Low Down," which is not listed, should be Track 2. The track listing for CD 2 is correct, as are the track listings for both CDs as they appear on the back of the CD case. Also, the booklet does not include the recording dates (25–28 February 2008) or the timings for each track. The track listings and the timings, for both CDs in the set, shown below are correct.

== Track listing (CD) ==
Disc One
No.	Title	Music	Length
1.	"Had to Cry Today"	Steve Winwood	7:47
2.	"Low Down"	J.J. Cale	4:10
3.	"Them Changes"	Buddy Miles	5:10
4.	"Forever Man"	Jerry Lynn Williams	3:33
5.	"Sleeping in the Ground"	Sam Myers	4:50
6.	"Presence of the Lord"	Eric Clapton	5:23
7.	"Glad"	Steve Winwood	4:13
8.	"Well All Right"	Jerry Allison/Buddy Holly/Joe B. Mauldin/Norman Petty	5:35
9.	"Double Trouble"	Otis Rush	8:06
10.	"Pearly Queen"	Jim Capaldi/Steve Winwood	6:10
11.	"Tell the Truth"	Eric Clapton/Bobby Whitlock	6:42
12.	"No Face, No Name, No Number"	Jim Capaldi/Steve Winwood	4:09

Disc Two
No.	Title	Music	Length
1.	"After Midnight"	J.J. Cale	4:45
2.	"Split Decision"	Joe Walsh/Steve Winwood	6:25
3.	"Rambling on My Mind (Clapton only)"	Robert Johnson	4:01
4.	"Georgia on My Mind (Winwood only)"	Hoagy Carmichael/Stuart Gorrell	5:05
5.	"Little Wing"	Jimi Hendrix	6:42
6.	"Voodoo Chile"	Jimi Hendrix	16:23
7.	"Can't Find My Way Home"	Steve Winwood	5:33
8.	"Dear Mr. Fantasy"	Jim Capaldi/Steve Winwood/Chris Wood	7:41
9.	"Cocaine"	J.J. Cale	6:41

== Track listing (DVD) ==
=== Disc One ===
1. "Had to Cry Today"
2. "Them Changes"
3. "Forever Man"
4. "Sleeping in the Ground"
5. "Presence of the Lord"
6. "Glad"
7. "Well All Right"
8. "Double Trouble"
9. "Pearly Queen"
10. "Tell the Truth"
11. "No Face, No Name, No Number"
12. "After Midnight"
13. "Split Decision"
14. "Rambling on My Mind"
  - Clapton solo performance
15. "Georgia on My Mind"
  - Winwood solo performance
16. "Little Wing"
17. "Voodoo Chile"
18. "Can't Find My Way Home"
19. "Dear Mr. Fantasy"
20. "Cocaine"

=== Disc Two ===
- Documentary: The Road to Madison Square Garden
- Documentary: Rambling on My Mind (includes Clapton at soundcheck performing "Rambling on My Mind")
- Bonus Performances: "Low Down", "Kind Hearted Woman", "Crossroads"

== Track listing (Blu-ray) ==
The Blu-ray release carries the same material as the DVD release on a single disc. Video format is 1080p; audio is provided in LPCM 2.0 and DTS 5.1 formats.

== Personnel ==
- Eric Clapton – guitar, vocals
- Steve Winwood – guitar, keyboards, vocals
- Chris Stainton – keyboards
- Willie Weeks – bass
- Ian Thomas – drums

== Chart positions ==
=== Weekly charts ===
Chart (2009–2010)	Peak position
Australian Music DVD (ARIA)	10
Austrian Albums (Ö3 Austria)	25
Austrian Music DVD (Ö3 Austria)	3
Belgian Albums (Ultratop Flanders)	64
Belgian Albums (Ultratop Wallonia)	46
Belgian Music DVD (Ultratop Flanders)	7
Belgian Music DVD (Ultratop Wallonia)	6
Danish Music DVD (Hitlisten)	3
Dutch Albums (Album Top 100)	60
Dutch Music DVD (MegaCharts)	6
French Albums (SNEP)	34
German Albums (Offizielle Top 100)	8
German Music DVD (Offizielle Top 20)	2
Hungarian Music DVD (MAHASZ)	17
Italian Albums (FIMI)	13
Japanese Albums (Oricon)	63
Japanese Music DVD (Oricon)	18
Mexican Albums (Top 100 Mexico)	85
New Zealand Music DVD (RMNZ)	5
Norwegian Albums (VG-lista)	31
Norwegian Music DVD (VG-lista)	5
Romanian Albums (IFPI)	10
Spanish Albums (Promusicae)	29
Spanish Music DVD (PROMUSICAE)	8
Swedish Albums (Sverigetopplistan)	44
Swedish Music DVD (Sverigetopplistan)	1
Swiss Albums (Schweizer Hitparade)	33
Swiss Music DVD (Schweizer Hitparade)	5
UK Albums (OCC)	40
UK Music DVD (OCC)	3
US Billboard 200	14
US Digital Albums (Billboard)	21
US Music DVD (Billboard)	1
US Top Rock Albums (Billboard)	4
US Indie Store Album Sales (Billboard)	9

=== Year-end charts ===
Chart (2009)	Position
German Albums (Offizielle Top 100)	83

== Certifications ==
Region	Certification	Certified units/sales
Germany (BVMI)	Gold	100,000^{^}
Video release
Germany (BVMI)	Gold	25,000^{^}
United States (RIAA)	2× Platinum	200,000^{^}
^{^} Shipments figures based on certification alone.
