= Winwood (album) =

Compilation album by Steve Winwood
- Released: May 1971
- Recorded: 1966–1970
- Genres: Rock, blue-eyed soul
- Label: United Artists
- Producers: (original recordings) Chris Blackwell, Jimmy Miller, Steve Winwood, Guy Stevens, Jac Holzman

Steve Winwood chronology
Winwood (1971)	Steve Winwood (1977)

Professional ratings
Review scores
Source	Rating
AllMusic	3/5 stars

Winwood is the first compilation album of music featuring English musician Steve Winwood. This two-record set was issued in 1971 by United Artists Records and features music which Winwood performed with the Spencer Davis Group, Powerhouse, Traffic and Blind Faith. UA Records issued this album after Winwood's band Traffic left UA when their home label Island Records set up their own American operation. Issued without Winwood's authorization as catalogue number UAS-9950, it was taken off the market after legal action by Winwood and Island Records. It was then reissued with minor changes as catalogue number UAS-9964. Currently out of print, it was issued on CD by Universal Music of Japan for the Japanese market.

== Track listing ==
=== Side one ===
(All songs performed by the Spencer Davis Group unless otherwise indicated)

1. "Keep On Running" (Jackie Edwards) – 2:42
2. "Somebody Help Me" (Edwards) – 1:57
3. "Goodbye Stevie" (Steve Winwood, Muff Winwood, Spencer Davis, Peter York) – 2:22
4. "Cross Roads" (Robert Johnson) – 2:32 (performed by Eric Clapton and the Powerhouse)
5. "Gimme Some Lovin'" (Steve Winwood, Muff Winwood, Davis) – 2:53

=== Side two ===
(Tracks 1, 2 and 3 performed by the Spencer Davis Group, tracks 4, 5 and 6 performed by Traffic)

1. "I'm A Man" (Steve Winwood, Jimmy Miller) – 2:48
2. "I Can't Get Enough of It" (Steve Winwood, Miller) – 3:37
3. "Stevie's Blues" (Steve Winwood) – 3:50
4. "Paper Sun" [45 RPM single edit] (Steve Winwood, Jim Capaldi) – 3:26
5. "Heaven Is in Your Mind" (Steve Winwood, Capaldi, Chris Wood) – 4:11
6. "Coloured Rain" (Steve Winwood, Capaldi, Wood) – 2:44

=== Side three ===
(All songs performed by Traffic)

1. "Dear Mr. Fantasy" (Steve Winwood, Capaldi, Wood) – 5:33
2. "Smiling Phases" (Steve Winwood, Capaldi, Wood) – 2:36
3. "Dealer" (Capaldi) – 3:10
4. "Medicated Goo" (Steve Winwood, Miller) – 3:35
5. "Forty Thousand Headmen" (Steve Winwood, Capaldi) – 3:11
6. "Vagabond Virgin" (Dave Mason, Capaldi) – 5:10

=== Side four ===
(All songs performed by Traffic unless otherwise indicated)

1. "Sea of Joy" (Steve Winwood) – 5:19 (performed by Blind Faith)
2. "Empty Pages" (Steve Winwood, Capaldi) – 4:30
3. "Stranger to Himself" (Steve Winwood, Capaldi) – 3:45
4. "Freedom Rider" (Steve Winwood, Capaldi) – 5:25

== Charts ==
Chart (1971)	Peak position
US Billboard 200	93
