= José Neto (musician) =

José Pires de Almeida Neto
- Also known as: José Neto
- Born: 1954 (age 71–72); São Paulo, Brazil
- Occupation: Jazz Guitarist
- Instruments: Electric nylon string guitar with polysubbass
- Years active: 1970–present
- Website: www.joseneto.com

José Pires de Almeida Neto (born 1954) is a Brazilian guitarist known for playing jazz. In addition to acoustic and electric guitars, he plays an electric nylon string guitar with polysubbass strings.

== Life ==
Neto started learning guitar from his mother at the age of four and began classical guitar lessons at the age of twelve, later studying at the music academy in his hometown. Beginning in 1970, he taught the guitar and had his own band, "Plato". In 1978 he became a member of Harry Belafonte's band. In 1982 Neto moved to San Francisco and was soon playing with Tania Maria, Paquito D’Rivera, Hugh Masekela, Herbie Mann, and Airto Moreira. In 1990 he became the musical director and composer for the band Fourth World, along with Moreira and Flora Purim. He also has recorded with George Benson. Since 2001, he has played with the Netoband, playing at various festivals through Europe and the United States. As a result, Neto joined Steve Winwood's band as their 2003 world tour began. He has been seen performing with Winwood on The View, Good Morning America, and Late Night with David Letterman, among other national television programs.

He has lived in Fairfax, California since the 1980s.

== Discography ==
- Mountains and the Sea (1987), with Randy Tico, Airto Moreira, and Flora Purim on Water lily acoustics
- Neto (1993)
- In Memory of Thunder (1996)
- Seventh Wave – The Lucky One (2000)
- Newspaper Girl (2012)

with Harry Belafonte

- Paradise in Gazankulu
- Belafonte '89

with Fourth World

- Fourth World Recorded live at Ronnie Scott's (1992)
- Fourth World (1994)
- Fourth World [live] (1995)
- Encounters of the Fourth World (1995)
- Last Journey (1999)

with Steve Winwood

- About Time (2003)
- Nine Lives (2008)

== Lexicographical entry ==
- Martin Kunzler, Jazz-Lexikon Bd. 2. Reinbek 2002; ISBN 3-499-16513-9
