= Dirty City =

2008 single by Steve Winwood and Eric Clapton

Single by Steve Winwood and Eric Clapton

from the album Nine Lives
- Released: 19 February 2008
- Genre: Rock
- Length: 7:45 (album version); 4:01 (radio edit)
- Label: Sony BMG
- Songwriters: Steve Winwood, Peter Godwin

Steve Winwood singles chronology
"Different Light" (2003)	"Dirty City" (2008)	"Spanish Dancer 2010" (2010)

Eric Clapton singles chronology
"I Ain't Gonna Stand for It" (2001)	"Dirty City" (2008)	"Every Little Thing" (2013)

"Dirty City" is a rock song by English musician Steve Winwood from his album Nine Lives, released on February 19, 2008.

The song features Eric Clapton on guitar and reached number one on Adult Album Alternative radio for three weeks.
