= Nine Lives (Steve Winwood album) =

Studio album by Steve Winwood
- Released: 29 April 2008
- Genres: Rock; pop; blues; soul
- Length: 57:13
- Label: Columbia
- Producer: Steve Winwood

Steve Winwood chronology
| About Time (2003) | Nine Lives (2008) | Live from Madison Square Garden (2009) |

Professional ratings
Review scores
| Source | Rating |
|---|---|
| AllMusic | 4/5 stars |
| Billboard | (not rated) |
| USA Today | 3/4 stars |

Nine Lives is Steve Winwood's ninth solo studio album, released on 29 April 2008. It is his last to date.

The album's first single, "Dirty City" featuring guitarist Eric Clapton, held the number-one added single spot for three weeks in a row and peaked at the overall number-two spot on AAA Radio.

The album debuted at number 12 on the U.S. Billboard 200 chart, selling about 26,000 copies in its first week.

== Track listing ==
1. "I'm Not Drowning" (Steve Winwood, Peter Godwin) – 3:32
2. "Fly" (Winwood, Godwin, José Pires de Almeida Neto) – 7:49
3. "Raging Sea" (Winwood, Godwin, Neto) – 6:17
4. "Dirty City" (with Eric Clapton) (Winwood, Godwin) – 7:44
5. "We're All Looking" (Winwood, Godwin) – 5:25
6. "Hungry Man" (Winwood, Godwin, Neto) – 7:07
7. "Secrets" (Winwood, Godwin, Neto) – 6:41
8. "At Times We Do Forget" (Winwood, Godwin, Neto) – 5:57
9. "Other Shore" (Winwood, Godwin, Neto) – 6:41

== Personnel ==
- Steve Winwood – vocals, Hammond organ, guitars
- Tim Cansfield – guitars
- Eric Clapton – guitars, guitar solo (4)
- José Pires de Almeida Neto – guitars
- Richard Bailey – drums
- Karl Vanden Bossche – percussion
- Paul Booth – flute, saxophone, human whistle

== Production ==
- Steve Winwood – producer
- Johnson Somerset – associate producer
- James Towler – engineer, mixing
- Tony Cousins – mastering
- Josh Cheuse – art direction, design
- Sam Erickson – photography
- Juan Pont Lezica – photography

Studios

- Recorded and Mixed at Wincraft Studios (Gloucestershire, UK).
- Mastered at Metropolis Studios (London, UK).

== Charts ==
| Chart (2008) | Peak position |
|---|---|
| Belgian Albums (Ultratop Flanders) | 71 |
| Belgian Albums (Ultratop Wallonia) | 78 |
| Dutch Albums (Album Top 100) | 51 |
| French Albums (SNEP) | 177 |
| German Albums (Offizielle Top 100) | 22 |
| Italian Albums (FIMI) | 26 |
| New Zealand Albums (RMNZ) | 34 |
| Scottish Albums (Official Charts) | 36 |
| Swiss Albums (Schweizer Hitparade) | 24 |
| UK Albums (Official Charts) | 31 |
| US Billboard 200 | 12 |
| US Top Rock Albums (Billboard) | 6 |
