= About Time (Steve Winwood album) =

Studio album by Steve Winwood
- Released: 17 June 2003
- Genre: Rock
- Length: 69:41
- Label: Wincraft Music
- Producers: Johnson Somerset, Steve Winwood

Steve Winwood chronology
Junction Seven (1997)	About Time (2003)	Nine Lives (2008)

About Time is the eighth solo studio album by Steve Winwood, released in 2003. It was his first album since 1997 and it featured a return to a musical style more in line with his earlier work with Traffic. That style is emphasized in the three piece band lineup: Hammond B-3 organ, guitar and drums, occasionally joined by saxophone, flute, conga drums and miscellaneous percussion characteristic of the Traffic sound from 1971-1974.

== Critical reception ==
Professional ratings
Review scores
Source	Rating
AllMusic	3.5/5 stars
New York Post	3.5/4 stars

Reviewing for AllMusic, critic Stephen Thomas Erlewine wrote of the album "Winwood's voice is now a little rough (which comes as a surprise), it nevertheless fits the scaled-down, relaxed atmosphere. And if individual songs are not necessarily memorable, they don't necessarily need to be -- the feel is the thing here, and while it isn't first-rate Steve Winwood, it does feel like a welcome update from an old friend, which, after several years of waiting and several uneven records, is enough." Dan Aquilante of the New York Post praised About Time as a "very good" fusion of rock, funk, Latin and world-beat influences, highlighting its Hammond organ-driven arrangements, soulful vocals, musical experimentation and the funk-infused "Bully" as a standout.

== Track listing ==
1. "Different Light" (Steve Winwood) – 6:35
2. "Cigano (For the Gypsies)" (S. Winwood, José Neto) – 6:20
3. "Take It to the Final Hour" (S. Winwood, Anthony Crawford) – 5:36
4. "Why Can't We Live Together" (Timmy Thomas) – 6:39
5. "Domingo Morning" (S. Winwood, Neto) – 5:06
6. "Now That You're Alive" (S. Winwood, Eugenia Winwood) – 5:29
7. "Bully" (S. Winwood, E. Winwood) – 5:40
8. "Phoenix Rising" (S. Winwood, William Topley) – 7:26
9. "Horizon" (S. Winwood, E. Winwood) – 4:31
10. "Walking On" (S. Winwood, Crawford) – 4:54
11. "Silvia (Who Is She?)" (S. Winwood, Neto) – 11:25

=== Bonus disc, 2004 Expanded Edition ===
1. "Dear Mr. Fantasy" (live) (S. Winwood, J.Capaldi, C.Wood) – 8:17
2. "Why Can't We Live Together" (live) (Timmy Thomas) – 6:31
3. "Voodoo Chile" (Jimi Hendrix) – 14:49

== Personnel ==
- Steve Winwood – vocals, Hammond B3 organ
- José Pires de Almeida Neto – guitars
- Walfredo Reyes Jr. – drums, additional percussion (2, 4)
- Karl Vanden Bossche – congas (2, 4, 6–8, 10)
- Richard Bailey – timbales (2, 4, 6–8, 10)
- Karl Denson – saxophone (1, 6), flute (8, 10)

== Production ==
- Producer – Steve Winwood
- Associate Producer – Johnson Somerset
- Engineer – George Shilling
- Mixing and Assistant Engineer – James Towler
- Recorded and Mixed at Wincraft Studios
- Mastered by Tony Cousins at Metropolis Mastering (London, UK).
- Bonus Tracks mastered by Bunt Stafford-Clark at Townhouse Studios (London, UK).
- Artwork – Michael Rios
- Photography – Gordon Jackson
- CD Booklet – Andy Dutlinger and Mark Berger/Madison House Design
- Artist Management – Mick Newton at Atomic (London, UK); Madison House Inc. (Boulder, CO).
- Business Management – Brighton Jeffrey James (London, UK) and Charles Sussman (Nashville, TN).

== Charts ==
Chart (2003)	Peak position
German Albums (Offizielle Top 100)	37
Italian Albums (FIMI)	66
Japanese Albums (Oricon)	174
UK Albums (Official Charts)	97
UK Independent Albums (Official Charts)	10
US Billboard 200	126
US Independent Albums (Billboard)	4
