= Talking Back to the Night =

Studio album by Steve Winwood
- Released: 2 August 1982
- Recorded: November 1981 – June 1982
- Studios: Netherturkdonic, Gloucestershire, England
- Genres: Electropop; synth-pop
- Length: 40:32
- Label: Island
- Producer: Steve Winwood

Steve Winwood chronology
Arc of a Diver (1980)	Talking Back to the Night (1982)	Back in the High Life (1986)

Singles from Talking Back to the Night
- 1. "Valerie" Released: October 1982; 2. "Still in the Game" Released: 1982

Talking Back to the Night is the third solo studio album by English recording artist Steve Winwood. Released less than two years after the top 3 hit Arc of a Diver, it failed to see as much success as its predecessor, reaching #28 on the Billboard 200. "Valerie" was a minor hit in 1982, but when it and the title track were remixed and re-released in 1987 for Chronicles, the newer version of "Valerie" became a top 10 hit, while the remix of "Talking Back to the Night" hit the Billboard Hot 100, but failed to crack the Top 40. The tracks "Help Me Angel" and "Valerie" were also remixed for Chronicles, and was then released for the first time as a single.

Winwood played all of the instruments on the album.

== Critical reception ==
Professional ratings
Review scores
Source	Rating
AllMusic	3/5 stars
Christgau's Record Guide: The '80s	C
Rolling Stone	2/5 stars

Reviewing for Rolling Stone in 1982, Parke Puterbaugh said the album is "for the most part a bland, easy-listening electropop rut". Mark Cooper was critical of the album, saying that the music "lacks the eccentricity or excitement that characterised Traffic's best work", adding that the "ludicrous" synths "emphasise the blandness of Winwood's current style".

== Track listing ==
All tracks are written by Steve Winwood and Will Jennings.

Side one
No.	Title	Length
1.	"Valerie"	4:05
2.	"Big Girls Walk Away"	3:51
3.	"And I Go"	4:12
4.	"While There's a Candle Burning"	3:08
5.	"Still in the Game"	4:49

Side two
No.	Title	Length
6.	"It Was Happiness"	4:59
7.	"Help Me Angel"	5:05
8.	"Talking Back to the Night"	5:43
9.	"There's a River"	4:40
Total length:		40:32

== Personnel ==
- Steve Winwood – lead and backing vocals, Prophet-5, Multimoog (also used for fretless bass), Hammond B3 organ, Linn LM-1 programming
- Nicole Winwood – backing vocals (tracks 2 and 5)

Production

- Steve Winwood – producer, engineer, mixing
- John "Nobby" Clarke – assistant engineer
- Lynn Goldsmith – photography
- Tony Wright – artwork

== Charts ==
=== Weekly charts ===
Chart (1982)	Peak position
Australian Albums (Kent Music Report)	21
Canada Top Albums/CDs (RPM)	12
Dutch Albums (Album Top 100)	6
German Albums (Offizielle Top 100)	9
Japanese Albums (Oricon)	66
New Zealand Albums (RMNZ)	19
Norwegian Albums (VG-lista)	7
Swedish Albums (Sverigetopplistan)	17
UK Albums (Official Charts)	6
US Billboard 200	28

=== Year-end charts ===
Chart (1982)	Position
Canada Top Albums/CDs (RPM)	59

== Certifications ==
Region	Certification	Certified units/sales
Canada (Music Canada)	Gold	50,000^{^}
^{^} Shipments figures based on certification alone.
