= Valerie (Steve Winwood song) =

1982 single by Steve Winwood

- 1982 UK 7-inch vinyl single

Single by Steve Winwood

from the album Talking Back to the Night
- B-side: "Slowdown Sundown"
- Released: October 1982
- Recorded: 1981
- Studio: Netherturkdonic, Gloucestershire, England
- Genre: Synth-pop
- Length: 4:05
- Label: Island
- Songwriters: Steve Winwood; Will Jennings
- Producer: Steve Winwood

Steve Winwood singles chronology
"Still in the Game" (1982)	"Valerie" (1982)	"Talking Back to the Night" (1982)

Music video
- "Valerie" on YouTube

"Valerie '87"

Single by Steve Winwood

from the album Chronicles
- B-side: "Talking Back to the Night" (instrumental); "The Finer Things" (12" version)
- Released: September 5, 1987
- Recorded: 1987 (remix and overdubs)
- Genre: Synth-pop
- Length: 4:05
- Label: Island
- Songwriters: Steve Winwood; Will Jennings
- Producers: Steve Winwood; Tom Lord-Alge

Steve Winwood singles chronology
"The Finer Things" (1987)	"Valerie '87" (1987)	"Roll with It" (1988)

"Valerie" is a song written by English musician and songwriter Steve Winwood and Will Jennings, and originally recorded by Winwood for his third solo album, Talking Back to the Night (1982).

== Background ==
The song deals with a man reminiscing about a lost love he hopes to find again someday. In an interview with Songfacts, Will Jennings said: "Valerie is a real person, whose identity I will not reveal. She was almost at the top of the world in her profession and let it slip away from her. She was a dear friend and this was my tribute to her." It has been alleged, however, that he was thinking about singer Valerie Carter.

On its original release, the single reached number 51 on the UK Singles Chart and number 70 on the US Billboard Hot 100.

In 1987, a remix by Tom Lord-Alge was included as a single from Winwood's compilation album Chronicles. The remixed version of "Valerie" climbed to number 9 on the Billboard Hot 100 in late December 1987, and also reached number 19 on the UK Singles Chart. Both versions also reached number 13 on the U.S. Mainstream Rock Tracks chart.

DJ Falcon recalled in an interview that he and Thomas Bangalter, as a duo called Together, had sampled "Valerie" to create a track that they used in DJ sets. Falcon added that the duo had no intention of releasing it as a single, despite demand from various outlets.

Eric Prydz later sampled "Valerie" in 2004 for a house music track and presented it to Winwood, who was so impressed with what Prydz had done, he re-recorded the vocals to better fit the track. It was released as "Call on Me" that same year. "Call on Me" was, in turn, sampled in 2009's "Pass Out" from Chris Brown (featuring Eva Simons) on his Graffiti album, also co-produced by Prydz.

== Track listing ==
- 1982 single:
1. "Valerie"
2. "Slowdown Sundown"
- 1987 7-inch single:
1. "Valerie"
2. "Talking Back to the Night" (instrumental)
- 1987 12" and CD single:
1. "Valerie"
2. "Talking Back to the Night" (instrumental)
3. "The Finer Things" (12" version)

== Charts ==
=== 1982 release ===
Chart (1982)	Peak position
Australia (Kent Music Report)	98
Canada Top Singles (RPM)	34
UK Singles (Official Charts)	51
US Billboard Hot 100	70
US Mainstream Rock (Billboard)	13

=== 1987 release ===
Chart (1987–1988)	Peak position
Australia (Kent Music Report)	17
Canada Top Singles (RPM)	17
Canada Adult Contemporary (RPM)	3
Finland (Suomen virallinen lista)	20
Ireland (IRMA)	19
New Zealand (Recorded Music NZ)	41
UK Singles (OCC)	19
US Billboard Hot 100	9
US Adult Contemporary (Billboard)	2
US Album Rock Tracks (Billboard)	13

=== Year-end charts ===
Chart (1988)	Position
US Billboard Hot 100	96
US Adult Contemporary (Billboard)	21

== Certifications ==
Region	Certification	Certified units/sales
United Kingdom (BPI)	Silver	200,000^{‡}
^{‡} Sales+streaming figures based on certification alone.
