= The Finer Things (song) =

- US edition cover

Single by Steve Winwood

from the album Back in the High Life
- B-side: "Night Train (Instrumental)"
- Released: February 1987
- Genre: Pop, blue-eyed soul
- Length: 4:00 (Edit Version); 5:52 (Album Version)
- Label: Island
- Songwriters: Steve Winwood, Will Jennings
- Producers: Steve Winwood, Russ Titelman

Steve Winwood singles chronology
"Back in the High Life Again" (1986)	"The Finer Things" (1987)	"Valerie" (1987)

"The Finer Things" is a 1987 song written and performed by Steve Winwood. It was released as the fourth single from Winwood's 1986 album Back in the High Life. It went to number one for three weeks on the Adult Contemporary chart in 1987 and peaked at number eight on the Billboard Hot 100.

== Track listing ==
7": Island / 7-28498 United States

1. "The Finer Things" - 4:00
2. "Night Train" (Instrumental) - 4:10

12": Island / 608 876 Europe

1. "The Finer Things" - 8:25
2. "The Finer Things" (Instrumental) - 4:35

== Personnel ==
- Steve Winwood – lead vocals, keyboards, synth solo, drum machine programming, sequencer programming
- Robbie Kilgore – additional keyboards, synthesizer and sequencer programming
- Rob Mounsey – additional keyboards
- Andrew Thomas – PPG Waveterm synthesizer programming
- Paul Pesco – guitar
- Jimmy Bralower – additional drum machine programming
- John Robinson – drums
- Carole Steele – congas
- James Ingram – backing vocals
- Dan Hartman – backing vocals

== Charts ==
=== Weekly charts ===
Chart (1987)	Peak position
Canada Top Singles (RPM)	25
US Billboard Hot 100	8
US Adult Contemporary (Billboard)	1
US Mainstream Rock (Billboard)	5

=== Year-end charts ===
Year-end chart (1987)	Position
US Top Pop Singles (Billboard)	76
