= Will Jennings =

American songwriter and composer (1944–2024)

- Jennings in 2006

Background information
- Born: Wilbur Herschel Jennings; June 27, 1944; Kilgore, Texas, U.S.
- Died: September 6, 2024 (aged 80) Tyler, Texas, U.S.
- Occupations: Lyricist
- Spouse: Carole Elizabeth Thurman

Wilbur Herschel Jennings (June 27, 1944 – September 6, 2024) was an American lyricist. He wrote the lyrics for the songs "Up Where We Belong", "Higher Love", "Tears in Heaven", "My Heart Will Go On" and "Valerie". He was inducted into the Songwriters Hall of Fame and won three Grammy Awards, two Golden Globe Awards, and two Academy Awards.

== Background ==
Wilbur Herschel Jennings was born in Kilgore, Texas, on June 27, 1944, the youngest of three siblings. He had two sisters, Joyce and Gloria. He attended school near Tyler, Texas, in the Chapel Hill Independent School District. He graduated from Tyler Junior College and taught English at the college. In 1966, Jennings earned his B.A. from Stephen F. Austin State University in Nacogdoches, Texas; he earned a master's degree the following year and taught English there. He taught at the University of Wisconsin–Eau Claire for three years, then moved to Nashville, Tennessee, in 1971 to begin his songwriting career.

== Career ==
Jennings was described as "the most erudite of lyricists". He wrote for a variety of artists, including Steve Winwood, Whitney Houston, Eric Clapton, B.B. King, Joe Sample, Rodney Crowell, Mariah Carey, Jimmy Buffett, Barry Manilow, and Roy Orbison. In Nashville he worked with other composers, and his first big hit came when Manilow took his joint composition with Richard Kerr, "Looks Like We Made It", to number 1 in 1977.

With Steve Winwood, Jennings wrote a series of albums including Arc of a Diver, Talking Back to the Night, and Back in the High Life, an album that contained the hits "Higher Love", "The Finer Things", and "Back in the High Life Again". Winwood won the Record Of The Year and Outstanding Male Vocal Performance. Both Jennings and Winwood were nominated for the Song of the Year award for "Higher Love."

With Joe Sample, Jennings wrote "Street Life" (a world-wide hit for the Crusaders with singer Randy Crawford) and several songs for various albums by the Crusaders for guest vocalists, including Joe Cocker ("I'm So Glad I'm Standing Here Today"), and Bill Withers ("Soul Shadows"). Jennings and Sample also wrote the better part of three albums for B.B. King, Midnight Believer in 1978, Take It Home in 1979, and There Is Always One More Time in 1991.

Richard Kerr and Jennings wrote "Somewhere in the Night" and "Looks Like We Made It" for Barry Manilow and "I'll Never Love This Way Again" for Dionne Warwick. Deana Martin recorded one of Jennings's songs, "I Know What You Are", on her 2016 album Swing Street.

Jennings collaborated on many songs for film, the most notable being "Up Where We Belong" for An Officer and a Gentleman, a song that won the Academy Award in America and the BAFTA (British Academy Award) in the United Kingdom and was a number one hit for Joe Cocker and Jennifer Warnes. In 1997, Jennings wrote the world-wide number one Céline Dion hit "My Heart Will Go On" for the film Titanic with his collaborator James Horner. The song became one of the most successful songs of all time and won the Golden Globe Award and the Academy Award for Best Song. They also won Record of the Year, Song of the Year and Best Song Written for a Motion Picture at the 41st Grammy Awards. Titanic's director, James Cameron, had at first been opposed to having a theme song playing over the closing credits, but Horner, having composed the instrumental motif, felt that it needed words and secretly had Jennings write a lyric. Cameron liked it and included it in the film.

Among his other collaborations were two albums written with Jimmy Buffett and Michael Utley, Riddles in the Sand and The Last Mango in Paris. Jennings also wrote several songs for Roy Orbison's King of Hearts album.

In Nashville, Jennings wrote hits with Rodney Crowell, including "Many a Long & Lonesome Highway", "What Kind of Love", and "Please Remember Me", a number one country hit for Tim McGraw. Jennings also wrote "Tears in Heaven" with Eric Clapton, which won song of the Year and also won the Ivor Novello award for best song from a film.

Teaming with James Horner and Mariah Carey, Jennings wrote the lyrics for the central song in How the Grinch Stole Christmas!, "Where Are You Christmas?", sung by a character within the film and by Faith Hill at the end of the film. In 2002, Horner and Jennings contributed a song for the Oscar-winning film A Beautiful Mind. In 2002, Peter Wolf's new album, Sleepless, appeared with positive reviews. The album featured six songs written by Jennings and Wolf, who collaborated previously on Fool's Parade (1999) on Mercury Records.

Jennings and Joe Sample, the keyboard player for the Crusaders, went back to 1978 and began by writing the Midnight Believer album for B.B. King and then wrote the hit "Street Life" for the Crusaders album of the same name. Jennings and Sample also wrote "One Day I'll Fly Away", originally sung by Crawford, which was featured in the film Moulin Rouge!, along with another of Jennings's songs, "Up Where We Belong". In the film "One Day I'll Fly Away" was sung by Nicole Kidman and, in March 2002, was released as a single in the UK from the second soundtrack album to emerge from Moulin Rouge.

== Personal life and death ==
Jennings married Carole Elizabeth Thurman on August 14, 1965, in Tyler, Texas. Following several years of declining health, Jennings died at his home in Tyler on September 6, 2024, at the age of 80.

== Albums ==
- With Steve Winwood: Arc of a Diver, Talking Back to the Night, Back in the High Life, Roll with It, Chronicles, Refugees Of The Heart
- With Joe Sample, for B.B. King: Midnight Believer, Take It Home, There Is Always One More Time
- With Joe Sample, for various artists: The Crusaders Vocal Album
- With Joe Sample, for Randy Crawford: Now We May Begin
- With Jimmy Buffett: Riddles in the Sand, The Last Mango In Paris
- With Timothy B. Schmit and Bruce Gaitsch: Timothy B.
- With Richard Kerr: Welcome to the Club
- With Roy Orbison: King of Hearts
- With Peter Wolf: Fool's Parade, Sleepless, and Midnight Souvenirs

== Hits ==
- Steve Winwood:
  - "While You See a Chance" (No. 7 US)
  - "Still in the Game" (No. 47 US)
  - "Higher Love" (No. 1 US, nominated for Grammy Award for Song of the Year 1987)
  - "Back in the High Life Again" (No. 13 US)
  - "The Finer Things" (No. 8 US)
  - "Valerie" (No. 9 US)
  - "Roll with It" (No. 1 US)
  - "Don't You Know What the Night Can Do?" (No. 6 US)
- Eric Clapton:
  - "Tears in Heaven" (No. 2 US, nominated for a Golden Globe award, 1993 Grammy for Song of the Year, 1993 Ivor Novello award from British Academy of Songwriters, Composers, and Authors)
- Dionne Warwick:
  - "I'll Never Love This Way Again" (No. 5 US)
  - "No Night So Long" (No. 23 US)
- Randy Crawford/The Crusaders:
  - "Street Life" (No. 36 US)
  - "One Day I'll Fly Away"
- Barry Manilow:
  - "Somewhere in the Night" (No. 9 US)
  - "Looks Like We Made It" (No. 1 US)
- Whitney Houston:
  - "Didn't We Almost Have It All" (No. 1 US)
- Rodney Crowell:
  - "Many a Long and Lonesome Highway" (No. 3 Country)
  - "What Kind Of Love"
- Jimmy Buffett:
  - "Who's The Blonde Stranger?" (No. 37 Country)
  - "If The Phone Doesn't Ring, It's Me" (No. 16 Country)
- Joe Cocker and Jennifer Warnes:
  - "Up Where We Belong" (No. 1 US, American Academy Award, British Academy Award, Winner Tokyo Song Festival)
- Celine Dion:
  - "My Heart Will Go On" (No. 1 US, American Academy Award, Golden Globe Award, Grammy for Song of the Year)
- Tim McGraw:
  - "Please Remember Me" (No. 1 Country)
- Diana Ross:
  - "If We Hold on Together" (No. 23 Adult Contemporary)

== Awards and honours ==
He has received the following major awards:

- Academy Award (1997), Golden Globe Award (1997), Grammy Award for writing the lyrics to "My Heart Will Go On" performed by Céline Dion for the motion picture Titanic.
- Golden Globe Award (1991) for writing the lyrics for "Tears in Heaven" by Eric Clapton for the film Rush and also in 1991 for writing the song "Dreams to Dream" for the motion picture An American Tail: Fievel Goes West.
- Academy Award (1983), Golden Globe Award (1983) along with Jack Nitzsche and Buffy Sainte-Marie for writing the song "Up Where We Belong" performed by Joe Cocker and Jennifer Warnes from the motion picture An Officer and a Gentleman.
- BAFTA (British Academy of Film and Television Arts) award for "Up Where We Belong" with Jack Nitzsche and Buffy Sainte-Marie
- Grammy Award (1993): "Tears in Heaven" (shared with Eric Clapton)
- Grammy Award (nomination) (1986): "Higher Love"
- Grammy Award to Dionne Warwick (1979): "I'll Never Love This Way Again" (co-written with Richard Kerr)
- Academy Award (nomination) (1980): for writing the song "People Alone" for the motion picture The Competition.

Jennings was inducted into the Songwriters Hall of Fame in 2006 and the Nashville Songwriters Hall of Fame seven years later.
