= Steve Winwood (album) =

Studio album by Steve Winwood
- Released: June 1, 1977
- Recorded: 1976–1977
- Genres: Funk rock; blue-eyed soul; pop rock
- Length: 37:38
- Label: Island
- Producers: Steve Winwood, Chris Blackwell, Mark Miller Mundy

Steve Winwood chronology
Winwood (1971)	Steve Winwood (1977)	Arc of a Diver (1980)

Steve Winwood is the debut solo studio album by English blue-eyed soulster Steve Winwood. It was released in 1977, three years after the break-up of his former band, Traffic. Though the album sold moderately well in the US, it was a commercial disappointment compared to Traffic's recent albums, peaking at number 22 on the Billboard albums chart. In the UK, where Traffic's recent albums had only been moderately successful, Steve Winwood reached number 12 on The Official Charts. Island Records released two singles from the album, "Hold On" and "Time Is Running Out", both of which failed to chart.

== Background ==
The initial sessions for Winwood's debut album were conducted in Chipping Norton in October 1976, where roughly a dozen songs were recorded over the course of three weeks, with sessions beginning at 2 pm and ending at 3 am. These sessions were done with a band consisting of Junior Marvin on guitar, Alan Spenner on bass, John Susswell on drums, and Brother James on percussion. Phill Brown, who served as the album's recording engineer commented on the nature of the recording sessions.

The ambience was good and at times quite magical. While we were recording, Steve said little to anyone and just played, hunched over the Hammond, Fender Rhodes or piano, often wearing a dark blue duffel coat with the hood up. This seemed to accentuate his isolation and made it difficult for the musicians to make any eye contact with him.

All of the material recorded at Chipping Norton was scrapped and redone with a different band. These efforts also proved unsuccessful, so sessions were relocated to Basing Street Studios with Andy Newmark and Willie Weeks. Brown explained that they chose to leave Chipping Norton over the belief that Winwood would adapt better in a more urban area. Basic tracks were completed over the course of one week, with an additional four months spent on overdubs.

In July 1977, Island Records launched a support campaign in the United States to bolster the sales of Steve Winwood. These efforts included advertisements on album oriented rock radio, national and consumer print programs, streamers, full-colour posters, mobile displays, and t-shirts.

== Reception ==
Professional ratings
Review scores
Source	Rating
AllMusic	3/5 stars
Christgau's Record Guide	C−

Cashbox characterised the album as "a heady brew of delightfully mixed musical ingredients that entices you with its alluringly fresh sound and subtly addictive proprieties." They identified Winwood's vocals as one of the album's signature components along with some "old Traffic magic". Record World believed that songs such as "Vacant Chair" and "Time Is Running Out" would result in "a welcome return to the airwaves" for Winwood. Billboard thought that the album was "very pleasing and easy to grasp both rhythmically and lyrically" but lacked the "distinctive lyrical charm" and "spontaneity and crispness" of Winwood's previous work with his other bands.

Reviewing in Christgau's Record Guide: Rock Albums of the Seventies (1981), Robert Christgau wrote: "Combined with Stomu Yamashta's ersatz electronic classicism on Go, Winwood's chronic meandering seemed vaguely interesting. On its own again, it just seems vague."

== Track listing ==
All songs written by Steve Winwood and Jim Capaldi, except where noted.

Side one

1. "Hold On" – 4:32
2. "Time Is Running Out" – 6:30
3. "Midland Maniac" (Winwood) – 8:32

Side two

1. "Vacant Chair" (Winwood, Viv Stanshall) – 6:54
2. "Luck's In" – 5:23
3. "Let Me Make Something in Your Life" – 5:33

== Personnel ==
Track numbering refers to CD and digital releases of the album.

Musicians

- Steve Winwood – lead and backing vocals (all tracks), electric piano (1, 2, 5), synthesizer (1, 2, 4), electric guitar (1, 2, 5, 6), saxophone (1), organ (2, 3, 4, 6), clavinet (2), acoustic piano (3, 4, 6), harmonium (3), harpsichord (3), acoustic guitar (3), electric and acoustic basses (3), drums (3), percussion (3, 5)
- Junior Marvin – guitar (4)
- Willie Weeks – bass guitar (1, 2, 5, 6)
- Alan Spenner – bass guitar (4)
- Andy Newmark – drums (1, 2, 5, 6)
- John Susswell – drums (4)
- Brother James – percussion (1, 4)
- Jim Capaldi – percussion (2), backing vocal (2)
- Rebop Kwaku Baah – congas (2, 5)
- Nicole Winwood (credited as "Nicole") – backing vocal (2)

Production

- Steve Winwood – producer
- Chris Blackwell – producer
- Mark Miller Mundy – associate producer
- Phill Brown – recording engineer
- Robert Ash – assistant engineer
- Ray Doyle – assistant engineer
- Lee Hulko – mastering
- Fin Costello – photography
- James Hutcheson – cover design, paintings

== Charts ==
Chart (1977)	Peak position
Australian Albums (Kent Music Report)	38
Japanese Albums (Oricon)	95
UK Albums (Official Charts)	12
US Billboard 200	22
