= Back in the High Life Again =

1986 single by Steve Winwood

- Cover art for UK and non-US editions

Single by Steve Winwood

from the album Back in the High Life
- B-side: "Night Train (instrumental)"
- Released: 22 November 1986
- Recorded: Autumn 1985
- Studio: Unique Recording Studio, New York
- Genre: Soul
- Length: 5:35 (Album Version); 4:20 (Single Version)
- Label: Island – IS 303
- Songwriters: Steve Winwood; Will Jennings
- Producer: Russ Titelman

Steve Winwood singles chronology
"Freedom Overspill" (1986)	"Back in the High Life Again" (1986)	"The Finer Things" (1987)

Audio
- "Back in the High Life Again" on YouTube

"Back in the High Life Again" is a song with music by the English recording artist Steve Winwood and lyrics by the American songwriter Will Jennings. It was performed by Winwood, and included backing vocals by James Taylor and a prominent mandolin played by Winwood. The song was released in November 1986 as the fifth single from his fourth solo album Back in the High Life. The song was Winwood's second number 1 single on the US Adult Contemporary chart, where it stayed for three weeks. It also reached number 13 on the US Billboard Hot 100 in August 1987. It was nominated for the Grammy Award for Record of the Year in 1988.

== Music video ==
The music video for the song features scenes from Manassas, Virginia, particularly the train station.

== Track listing ==
7-inch: Island / IS 303 United Kingdom

1. "Back in the High Life Again" - 4:20
2. "Help Me Angel" - 5:06

7-inch: Island / 7-28472 United States

1. "Back in the High Life Again" - 4:09
2. "Night Train" (Instrumental) - 4:10

12-inch: Island / 12 IS 303 United Kingdom

1. "Back in the High Life Again" - 4:20
2. "Night Train" (Instrumental) - 4:08
3. "Help Me Angel" - 5:06

12-inch: Island / PRO-A-2620 United States

1. "Back in the High Life Again" - 4:20
2. "Back in the High Life Again" - 5:33

== Personnel ==
- Steve Winwood – lead vocals, piano, synthesizer, drum machine programming, mandolin, Moog bass
- Jimmy Bralower – additional drum machine programming
- Rob Mounsey – additional synthesizer
- John Robinson – drums
- James Taylor – harmony vocals

== Chart history ==
=== Weekly charts ===
Chart (1987)	Peak position
Australia (Kent Music Report)	87
Belgium (Ultratop 50 Flanders)	18
Canada Adult Contemporary (RPM)	24
Canada Top Singles (RPM)	45
Netherlands (Dutch Top 40 Tipparade)	3
Netherlands (Single Top 100)	61
UK Singles (Official Charts)	53
US Billboard Hot 100	13
US Adult Contemporary (Billboard)	1
US Mainstream Rock (Billboard)	19
US Cash Box Top 100	13

=== Year-end charts ===
Chart (1987)	Rank
US Billboard Adult Contemporary	11
US (Joel Whitburn's Pop Annual)	124
