= Arc of a Diver =

Studio album by Steve Winwood
- Released: 29 December 1980
- Recorded: 1980
- Studios: Netherturkdonic, Gloucestershire, England
- Genres: Soft rock; blue-eyed soul; pop
- Length: 39.49
- Label: Island
- Producer: Steve Winwood

Steve Winwood chronology
Steve Winwood (1977)	Arc of a Diver (1980)	Talking Back to the Night (1982)

Arc of a Diver is the second and breakout solo studio album by the English singer/multi-instrumentalist Steve Winwood. Released in 1980, Winwood played all of the instruments on the album.

The lead single, "While You See a Chance" (which peaked at number 7 on the Billboard Hot 100 in the United States), was Winwood's first solo hit. The album peaked at number 3 on the Billboard 200 album chart, establishing Winwood as a commercially viable act.

The cover artwork for the album is by Tony Wright. He took inspiration from Jazz by Henri Matisse, notably VIII: Icarus.

== Recording ==
The album was recorded at Winwood's Netherturkdonic Studios, built at his farm in Gloucestershire; he played all the instruments and wrote all the music, as well as producing and engineering the album himself.

== Critical reception ==
Professional ratings
Review scores
Source	Rating
AllMusic	4.5/5 stars
Christgau's Record Guide	B−
The Encyclopedia of Popular Music	5/5 stars
The Great Rock Discography	8/10
MusicHound Rock	4.5/5 stars
Record Collector	4/5 stars
Record Mirror	4/5 stars
Rolling Stone	4/5 stars
The Rolling Stone Album Guide	4.5/5 stars
Smash Hits	5/10

Reviewing for The Village Voice in June 1981, Robert Christgau credited Winwood for overdubbing all his self-performed instruments, but still found his brand of "British-international groove" more atmospheric than song-oriented and ultimately "lulling". Robert Palmer was more enthusiastic in The New York Times, saying that Winwood has transformed himself into a "rock traditionalist" with the album. While highlighting "Dust" and the album's title track as "first-rate lyrics", Palmer said that "Winwood's impressive playing and arranging and utterly distinctive vocals make several of his collaborations with Will Jennings, especially the brooding 'Night Train,' almost as memorable." In a retrospective review for AllMusic, William Ruhlmann wrote of the album, "Utterly unencumbered by the baggage of his long years in the music business, Winwood reinvents himself as a completely contemporary artist on this outstanding album, leading off with his best solo song, 'While You See a Chance'."

The album was included in the book 1001 Albums You Must Hear Before You Die, and was voted number 455 in the third edition (2000) of Colin Larkin's All Time Top 1000 Albums.

== Track listing ==
All songs written by Steve Winwood and Will Jennings except where noted.

=== Original release ===
Side one

1. "While You See a Chance" – 5:12
2. "Arc of a Diver" (Winwood, Vivian Stanshall) – 5:28
3. "Second-Hand Woman" (Winwood, George Fleming) – 3:41
4. "Slowdown Sundown" – 5:27

Side two

1. "Spanish Dancer" – 5:58
2. "Night Train" – 7:51
3. "Dust" (Winwood, Fleming) – 6:20

=== 2012 Deluxe reissue ===
Tracks 1–7 on disc one, per the 1980 release, with disc two containing bonus tracks.

1. "Arc of a Diver" [edited US single version] (Winwood, Stanshall) – 4:16
2. "Night Train" [instrumental version] – 6:44
3. "Spanish Dancer" [2010 version] – 6:13
4. "Arc of a Diver: The Steve Winwood Story" [originally aired on BBC Radio 2] – 56:33

Track 3 originally released on Revolutions – The Very Best of Steve Winwood.

== Personnel ==
- Steve Winwood – lead and backing vocals, Prophet-5, Minimoog, Yamaha CS-80, Hammond B3 organ, Steinway piano, Ovation acoustic guitar, Fender Stratocaster electric guitar, Ibanez mandolin, bass guitar, Multimoog (also used for keyboard fretless bass), Hayman and Ludwig drums, Linn LM-1 programming, percussion, producer, engineer, mixing
- John "Nobby" Clarke – additional engineer
- John Dent – mastering at The Sound Clinic (London, UK)
- Tony Wright – artwork
- Fin Costello – photography

== Charts ==
=== Weekly charts ===
Chart (1981)	Peak position
Australian Albums (Kent Music Report)	5
Canada Top Albums/CDs (RPM)	1
Dutch Albums (Album Top 100)	6
French Albums (SNEP)	3
German Albums (Offizielle Top 100)	26
New Zealand Albums (RMNZ)	3
Norwegian Albums (VG-lista)	24
Swedish Albums (Sverigetopplistan)	33
UK Albums (Official Charts)	13
US Billboard 200	3

=== Year-end charts ===
Chart (1981)	Peak position
Canada Top Albums/CDs (RPM)	12
Dutch Albums (Album Top 100)	35
German Albums (Offizielle Top 100)	49
New Zealand Albums (RMNZ)	15
US Billboard 200	17

== Sales and certifications ==
Region	Certification	Certified units/sales
Australia	—	70,000
Canada (Music Canada)	Platinum	100,000^{^}
United Kingdom (BPI)	Silver	60,000^{^}
United States (RIAA)	Platinum	1,000,000^{^}
^{^} Shipments figures based on certification alone.
