= While You See a Chance =

1980 single by Steve Winwood

- US single sleeve

Single by Steve Winwood

from the album Arc of a Diver
- B-side: "Vacant Chair"
- Released: 19 December 1980
- Recorded: 1980
- Studio: Netherturkdonic, Gloucestershire, England
- Genre: Pop
- Length: 5:11 (album version); 4:07 (single edit)
- Label: Island
- Songwriters: Steve Winwood; Will Jennings
- Producer: Steve Winwood

Steve Winwood singles chronology
"Time Is Running Out" (1977)	"While You See a Chance" (1980)	"Arc of a Diver" (1981)

Music video
- "While You See a Chance" on YouTube

Audio
- "While You See a Chance" (album version) on YouTube

"While You See a Chance" is a song performed by the English musician Steve Winwood, which he co-wrote with the American lyricist Will Jennings. It was first released as the lead single of his second studio album Arc of a Diver (1980).

In the United Kingdom, the single was released by Island Records in December 1980, with the song "Vacant Chair" (from his 1977 self-titled debut album) included as its B-side. A few months after its release, the song became Island Records' first cassette single. The song ultimately reached number 45 in Winwood's native UK.

According to Radio & Records, "While You See a Chance" was the fourth most-added song to US radio stations during the week of February 7, 1981. By the following week, 62% of reporting radio stations had included the song in their playlists. The song peaked at number 7 on the US Billboard Hot 100 in April 1981 and number 68 on the Billboard year-end top 100 for 1981. The song was a bigger hit in Canada, where it peaked at number 3.

== Background ==
Winwood co-wrote the song with Will Jennings, who developed the lyrics. When discussing the collaboration with Jennings, Winwood said that "we didn't talk about what the song was about. He just came up with the lyrics and it was right for me, right for him, and right for the song."

When the song was being mixed, Nobby Clark, who served as an engineer for the recording sessions, accidentally deleted the drum tracks by hitting the "record" feature on the mixing console. Attempts to fully restore the drums were unsuccessful, so Winwood took a Minimoog solo that he had played at the end of the song and repurposed it for the intro.

According to Clark, Winwood determined that the minimoog solo would be a "perfect way to open the song". Clark stated that "the disaster turned into something really memorable. It had been a terrible two weeks trying to patch things up and we ended with pure magic." Winwood played all the instruments on the song. By 1988, the song had received enough airplay to earn Winwood the Million Play award.

== Critical reception ==
Reviewing the single for Music Week, Tony Jasper felt that the song bore a resemblance to some of Winwood's previous work with the Spencer Davis Group, Blind Faith, and Traffic without sounding dated. Cashbox characterised the song as "solid pop, AOR fare from the veteran" with "layers of reverent keyboards [that] slowly give way to a more peppy tempo." Record World called the song's keyboard work "celestial" and "outstanding".

== Personnel ==
- Steve Winwood – lead and backing vocals, acoustic piano, organ, Minimoog synthesizer, drums, tambourine, congas

== Charts ==
=== Weekly charts ===
Chart (1981)	Peak position
Australia (Kent Music Report)	16
Belgium (Ultratop 50 Flanders)	8
Canada Top Singles (RPM)	3
Netherlands (Dutch Top 40)	10
Netherlands (Single Top 100)	21
New Zealand (Recorded Music NZ)	28
UK Singles (Official Charts)	45
US Billboard Hot 100	7
US Adult Contemporary (Billboard)	17
US Mainstream Rock (Billboard)	2
US Cash Box Top 100	10

=== Year-end charts ===
Chart (1981)	Position
Canada Top Singles (RPM)	23
Netherlands (Dutch Top 40)	96
US Billboard Hot 100	68
US Cash Box	72
