= Can't Find My Way Home =

1969 single by Blind Faith

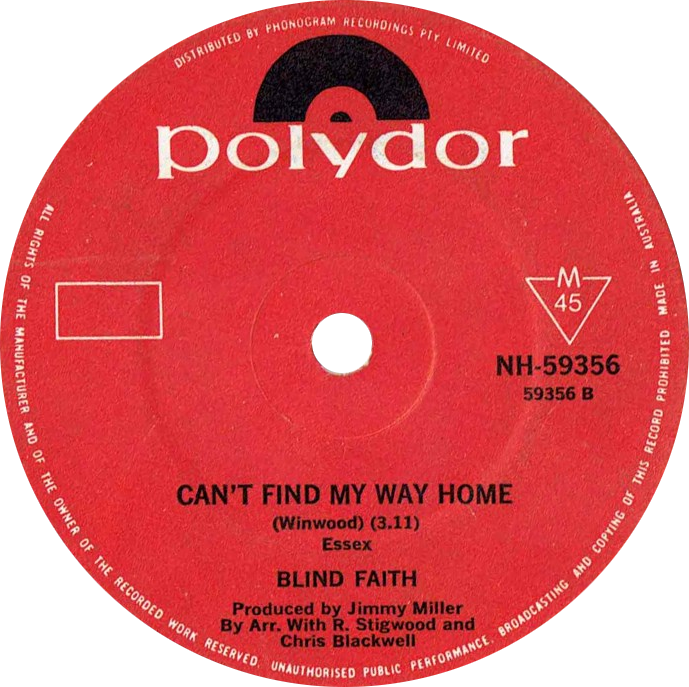
- B-side of Australian release of "Well, All Right"

Single by Blind Faith

from the album Blind Faith
- A-side: "Well All Right"
- Released: August 1969
- Recorded: London, Spring 1969
- Genre: Folk rock
- Length: 3:16
- Label: Polydor
- Songwriter: Steve Winwood
- Producer: Jimmy Miller

Official audio
- "Can't Find My Way Home" on YouTube

"Can't Find My Way Home" is a song written by Steve Winwood that was first released by the English rock supergroup Blind Faith on their 1969 self-titled lone album. The song was also issued as a single B-side in some countries in 1969 and as an A-side, on the RSO label in the United States, in 1977.

== Origin and meaning ==
Winwood appears to have never spoken publicly about the origin or meaning of the song. He has said that "When I write a song, I don't like to have to explain it afterwards. To me, it's like telling a joke, then having to explain it. The explanation doesn't add to the song at all."

== Personnel ==
- Steve Winwood – vocals, guitars, keyboards
- Eric Clapton – guitars
- Ric Grech – bass guitar
- Ginger Baker – drums, percussion

== Reception ==
Rolling Stone, in a review of the album, noted that the song featured "Ginger Baker's highly innovative percussion" and judged the lyric "...I'm wasted and I can't find my way home" to be "delightful".

== Cover versions ==
Eric Clapton tapped American actress and singer Yvonne Elliman to sing "Can't Find My Way Home" during his 1976 and 1977 concert tours.

Alternative dance supergroup Electronic covered the song in 1999 for their third album, Twisted Tenderness.
