= Steve Winwood =

English musician (born 1948)

Steve Winwood MBE
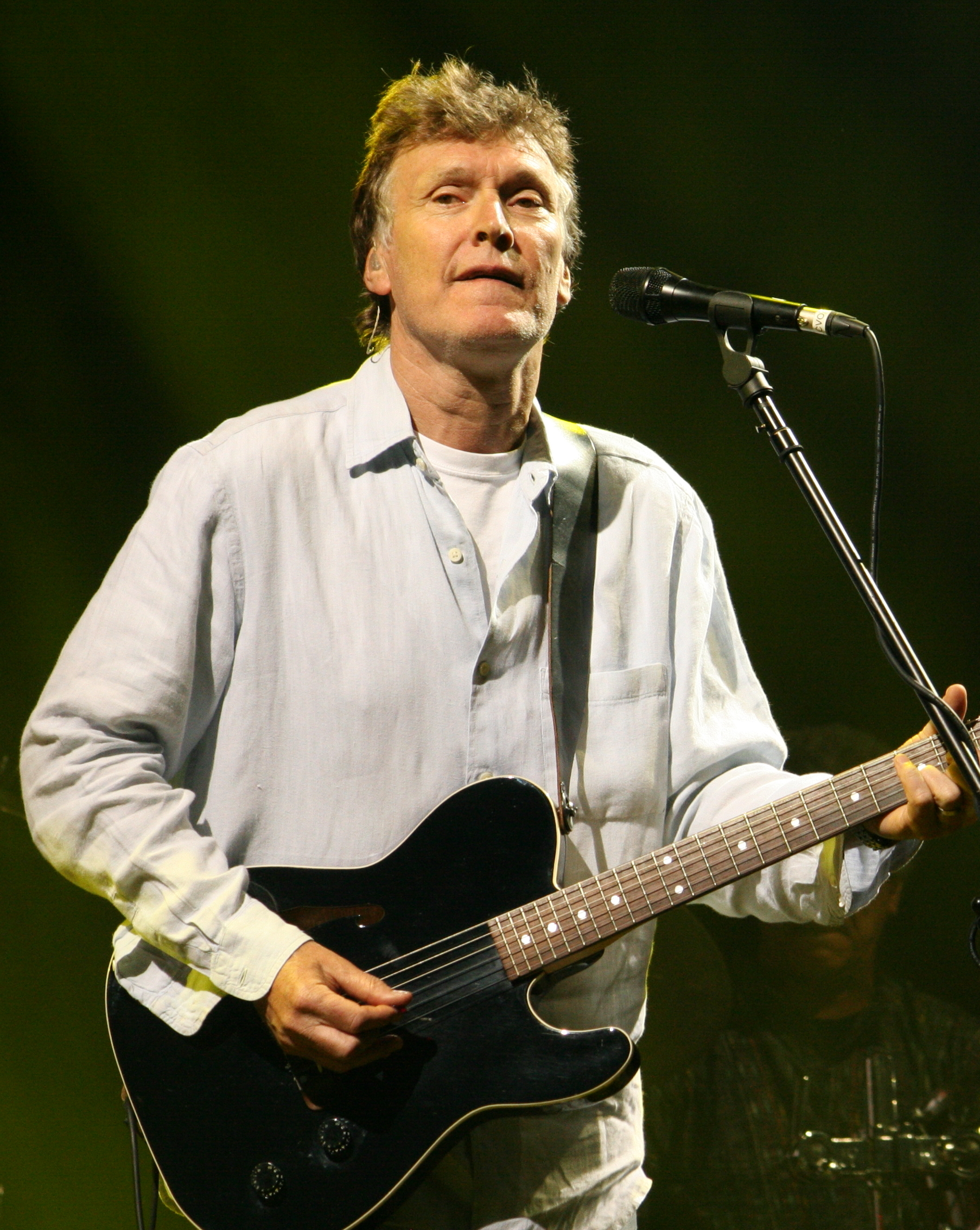
- Winwood in 2009

Background information
- Born: Stephen Lawrence Winwood; 12 May 1948 (age 78); Handsworth, Birmingham, England
- Genres: Blue-eyed soul; R&B; blues rock; pop
- Occupations: Musician; songwriter
- Instruments: Vocals; keyboards; guitar; mandolin; bass
- Years active: 1961–present
- Labels: Island; Virgin; Wincraft Music; Columbia
- Formerly of: The Muff Woody Jazz Band; The Spencer Davis Group; Eric Clapton and the Powerhouse; Traffic; Blind Faith; Ginger Baker's Air Force; The Third World; Go; The Louisiana Gator Boys; Hope Collective; One World Project
- Website: stevewinwood.com

Stephen Lawrence Winwood (born 12 May 1948) is an English musician and songwriter whose genres include blue-eyed soul, rhythm and blues, blues rock and pop rock. Though primarily a keyboard player, guitarist and vocalist prominent for his distinctive soulful high tenor voice, Winwood also plays other instruments including mandolin, electric bass, saxophone, flute, drums and percussion.

Winwood achieved fame during the 1960s and 1970s as an integral member of three successful bands: the Spencer Davis Group, Traffic and Blind Faith. During the 1980s his solo career flourished and he had a number of hit singles, including "While You See a Chance" (1980) from the album Arc of a Diver, and "Valerie" (1982) from Talking Back to the Night ("Valerie" became a hit when it was re-released with a remix from Winwood's 1987 compilation album Chronicles).

Winwood's 1986 album Back in the High Life marked his career zenith, with hit singles including "Back in the High Life Again", "The Finer Things", and the US Billboard Hot 100 No.1 hit "Higher Love". He reached No.1 on the Hot 100 again with "Roll with It" (1988) from the album Roll with It, with "Don't You Know What the Night Can Do?" and "Holding On" also charting highly the same year. Although his hit singles ceased after the 1980s, he continued to release new albums. His most recent album, Nine Lives, was released in 2008.

In 2004, Winwood was inducted into the Rock and Roll Hall of Fame as a member of Traffic. He has won two Grammy Awards and an Ivor Novello Award, and has been honoured as a BMI Icon. In 2008, Rolling Stone ranked Winwood the 33rd-greatest singer. In 2025, Winwood was appointed a Member of the Order of the British Empire (MBE) in the King's Birthday Honours.

== Early life ==
Winwood was born on 12 May 1948 in Handsworth, Birmingham. His father Lawrence, a foundryman by trade, was a semi-professional musician, playing mainly the saxophone and clarinet. Winwood began playing piano at the age of four while interested in swing and Dixieland jazz, and soon started playing drums and guitar. He was also a choirboy at St John the Evangelist's Church, Perry Barr. The family moved from Handsworth to Atlantic Road, Kingstanding, Birmingham, and he attended Great Barr School, one of the first comprehensive schools. He also attended classes at the Birmingham and Midland Institute to develop his skills as a pianist, but did not complete his course. During this time, he befriended future Fleetwood Mac member Christine Perfect.

At eight years of age, Winwood first performed with his father and elder brother Muff in the Ron Atkinson band. Muff Winwood later recalled that when Steve began playing regularly with him and his father in licensed pubs and clubs, the piano had to be turned with its back to the audience to try to hide him because he was so obviously underage.

== Career ==
=== Early years ===
While still a pupil at Great Barr School, Winwood was a part of the Birmingham blues rock scene, playing the Hammond C-3 organ and guitar, backing blues and rock legends such as Muddy Waters, John Lee Hooker, Howlin' Wolf, B. B. King, Chuck Berry and Bo Diddley on their United Kingdom tours, the custom at that time being for US singers to travel solo and be backed by pick-up bands. At this time, Winwood was living on Atlantic Road in Kingstanding, close to the Birmingham music halls where he played. Winwood modelled his singing after Ray Charles.

=== The Spencer Davis Group ===
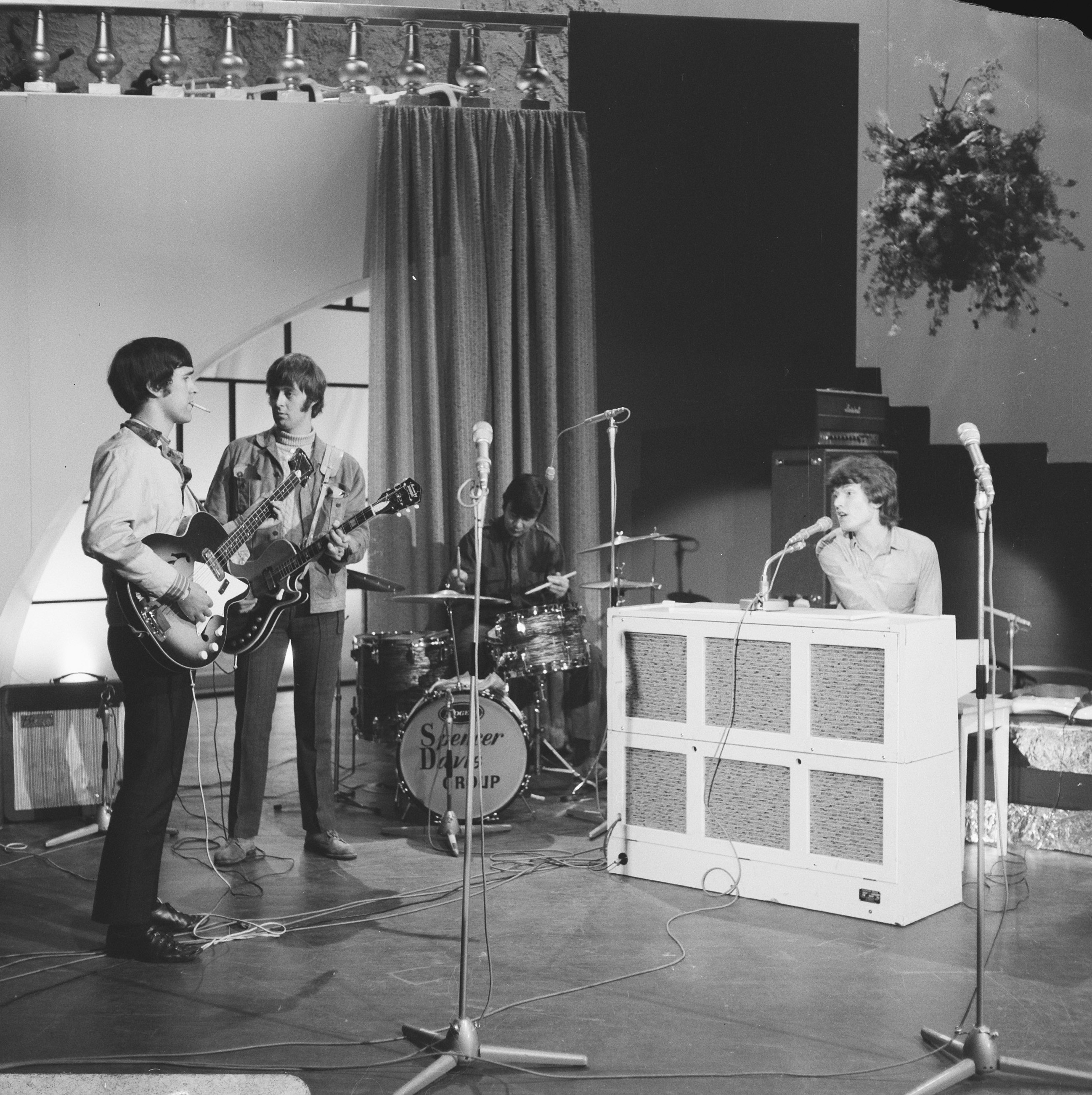
The Spencer Davis Group in 1966, L to R: Muff Winwood, Spencer Davis, Pete York, Steve Winwood

In 1963, Winwood (then known as "Stevie" Winwood) became singer and keyboardist of the Spencer Davis Group, with his older brother Muff Winwood on bass, Spencer Davis on guitar, and Pete York on drums. Davis had been impressed by the Winwood brothers after he saw them performing as the Muffy Wood Jazz Band at the Golden Eagle in Birmingham. The Spencer Davis Group made their debut at the Eagle and subsequently had a Monday-night residency there. Winwood's distinctive high tenor singing voice and vocal style drew comparisons to Ray Charles.

In 1964, the Spencer Davis Group signed their first recording contract with Island Records. Producer and founder Chris Blackwell later said of Winwood, "He was really the cornerstone of Island Records. He's a musical genius and because he was with Island all the other talent really wanted to be with Island." The group's first single "Dimples" was released 10 days after Winwood's 16th birthday.

The group had two UK No.1 singles in late 1965 and early 1966 with "Keep on Running" and "Somebody Help Me". The money from this success allowed Winwood to buy his own Hammond organ. Winwood co-wrote the band's breakthrough hits in America, "Gimme Some Lovin'" and "I'm a Man", both of which went Top 10 in the US and UK in late 1966 and early 1967. Winwood left the Spencer Davis Group in April 1967.

=== Traffic and Blind Faith ===
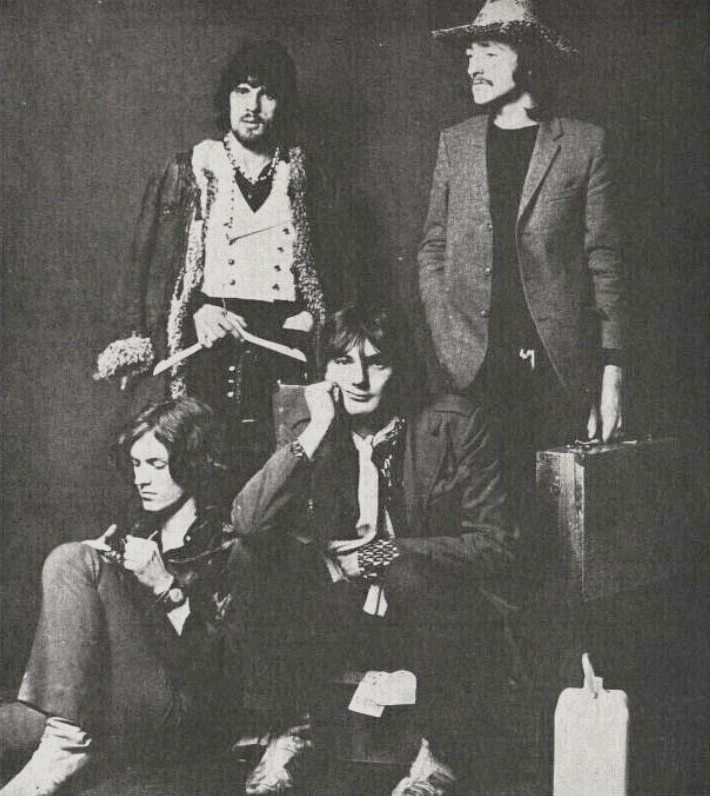
Traffic in 1968, clockwise from top left: Jim Capaldi, Dave Mason, Chris Wood, Winwood

Winwood met drummer Jim Capaldi, guitarist Dave Mason and multi-instrumentalist Chris Wood when they jammed together at The Elbow Room, a club in Aston, Birmingham. After Winwood left the Spencer Davis Group in April 1967, the quartet formed Traffic. Soon after, they rented a cottage near the rural village of Aston Tirrold, Berkshire (now Oxfordshire), to write and rehearse new music. This allowed them to escape the city and develop their music.

Early in Traffic's formation, Winwood and Capaldi formed a songwriting partnership, with Winwood writing music to match Capaldi's lyrics. This partnership was the source of most of Traffic's material, including popular songs such as "Paper Sun", "No Face, No Name, No Number", "Dear Mr. Fantasy", and "The Low Spark of High-Heeled Boys", and outlived the band, producing several songs for Winwood's and Capaldi's solo albums. Over the band's history, Winwood performed the majority of their lead vocals, keyboard instruments and guitars (guitars more so after Mason's departure in 1968). Traffic disbanded in early 1969 after two albums, Mr. Fantasy (1967) and Traffic (1968), with a third album, Last Exit, being issued later that year.

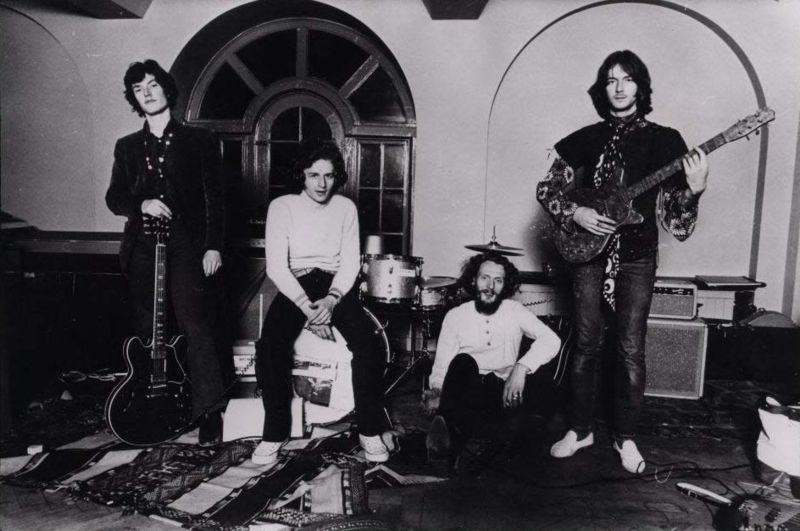
Blind Faith in 1969, L to R: Winwood, Ric Grech, Ginger Baker, Eric Clapton

Following Traffic's split, Winwood formed the supergroup Blind Faith, along with former Cream members Eric Clapton (guitar) and Ginger Baker (drums), and former Family member Ric Grech (bass). The band produced only one album, which reached No.1 in both the UK and US, and included "Can't Find My Way Home". The band was short-lived owing to Clapton's greater interest in Blind Faith's opening act on tour, Delaney & Bonnie & Friends; Clapton left the band at the tour's completion, bringing Blind Faith to an end.

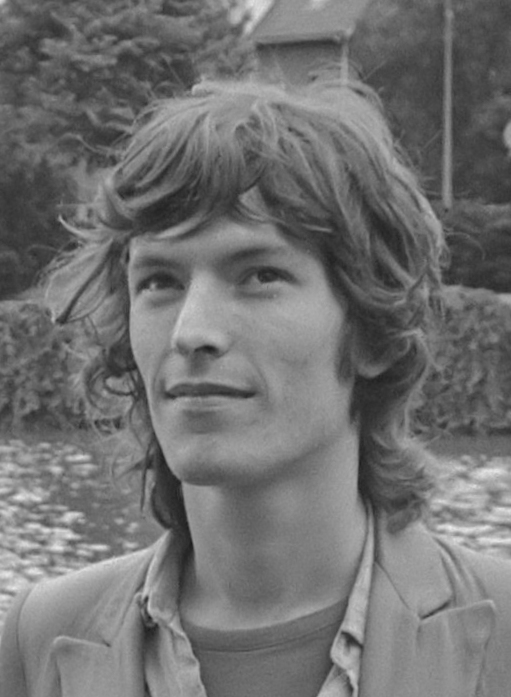
Winwood in 1970

In 1970, Winwood went into the studio to begin work on a solo album, tentatively titled Mad Shadows. He called in his former Traffic bandmates Jim Capaldi and Chris Wood to help, resulting in the Traffic reunion album, John Barleycorn Must Die. Traffic would continue for another five albums: Welcome to the Canteen (1971), The Low Spark of High Heeled Boys (1971), Shoot Out at the Fantasy Factory (1973), On the Road (1973) and When the Eagle Flies (1974). Weariness with the grind of touring and recording prompted Winwood to break up Traffic in 1974 and retire to session work for several years.

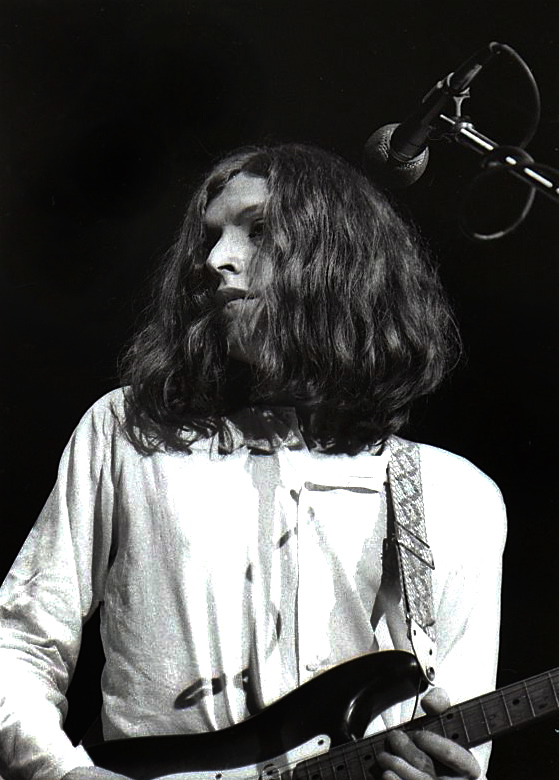
Winwood in 1973 on stage with Traffic

=== Other 1960s and 1970s work ===
In 1966, three years before Blind Faith, Winwood guested with Eric Clapton as part of the temporary group Eric Clapton and the Powerhouse. Three tracks were recorded and released on the 1966 various artists compilation album, What's Shakin'. In 1968, Winwood was recruited by Jimi Hendrix to play organ for "Voodoo Chile" on the Electric Ladyland album.

Following the end of Blind Faith, Winwood and Ric Grech continued working with Ginger Baker as part of Ginger Baker's Air Force, who also featured Winwood's Traffic bandmate Chris Wood. Winwood played on their self-titled first album, released in 1970.

In 1972, Winwood recorded the part of Captain Walker in the highly successful orchestral version of the Who's Tommy. He recorded a 1973 album with Remi Kabaka and Abdul Lasisi Amao (as 'The Third World'), Aiye-Keta. Later, after the unrelated reggae group Third World had formed, the album was re-released and identified by the band members' names. In 1976, Winwood provided vocals and keyboards on GO, a concept album by Japanese composer Stomu Yamashta. That same year, Winwood also played guitar on the Fania All Stars' Delicate and Jumpy record and performed as a guest with the band in their only UK appearance, a sold-out concert at the Lyceum Theatre, London.

Under pressure from Island Records, Winwood finally released his self-titled debut solo album in 1977. In 1979 he played keyboards on the Marianne Faithfull album Broken English, including synthesizer on the tracks "The Ballad of Lucy Jordan" and the title track, which were taken as singles from the album.

=== Solo career success ===
In 1980, Winwood released his second solo album, Arc of a Diver, which included his first solo hit, "While You See a Chance". This was followed by Talking Back to the Night in 1982, which featured the song "Valerie", which would eventually become a hit single upon re-release in 1987. Both Arc of a Diver and Talking Back to the Night were recorded at his home in Gloucestershire with Winwood playing all instruments.

In 1986, Winwood travelled to New York City for his next album project. There, he enlisted the help of a coterie of stars to record Back in the High Life. The album went triple platinum in the US, with its first single "Higher Love" reaching No.1 on the Billboard Hot 100 and earning Winwood Grammy Awards for Record of the Year and Best Male Pop Vocal Performance. He embarked on an extensive tour of North America in support of the album, and at the end of the tour, he divorced Nicole Weir in England then settled in the Nashville area with his new American wife, Eugenia Crafton.

With the exception of 1969's Blind Faith, Winwood had been with Island Records since the Spencer Davis Group's first single in 1964. However, at the peak of his commercial success, Winwood moved to Virgin Records and released the albums Roll with It (1988) and Refugees of the Heart (1990). Roll with It and its title track hit No.1 on the US album and singles charts in the summer of 1988.

=== Traffic reunion and subsequent work ===
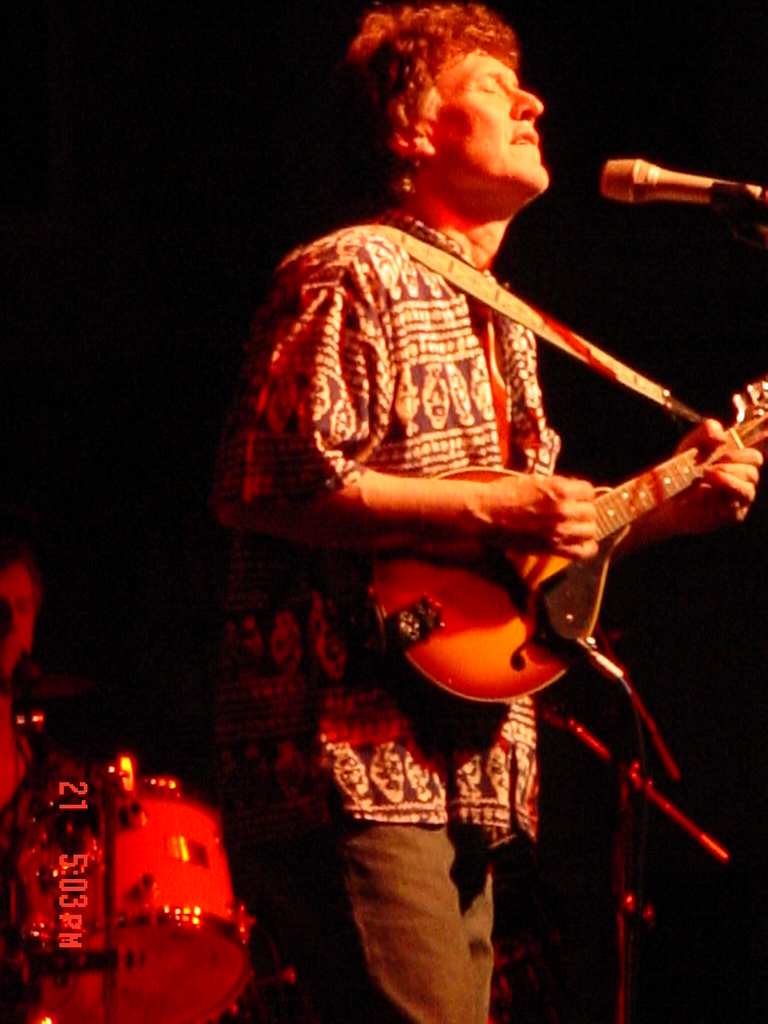
Winwood performing in Knoxville, Tennessee, 2005

In 1994, Winwood and Jim Capaldi reformed as Traffic for the album Far from Home. Despite lacking a significant hit, it broke the top 40 in both the UK and US. The band toured that year, which included a performance at the Woodstock '94 Festival. That same year, Winwood appeared on the A Tribute To Curtis Mayfield CD, recording Mayfield's "It's All Right".

In 1995, Winwood released "Reach for the Light" for the animated film Balto. Winwood's final Virgin album, Junction Seven, was released in 1997, reaching the UK top 40. Later that year, he toured the US, and sang with Chaka Khan at the VH-1 Honors.

In 1998, Winwood joined Tito Puente, Arturo Sandoval, Ed Calle and other musicians to form the band "Latin Crossings" for a European tour, after which they split without making any recordings. Winwood also appeared in the film Blues Brothers 2000, as a member of the Louisiana Gator Boys, appearing on stage with Isaac Hayes, Eric Clapton and KoKo Taylor at the battle of the bands competition.

In 2003, Winwood released a new album, About Time, on his new record label, Wincraft Music. In 2004, Eric Prydz sampled Winwood's 1982 song "Valerie" for the song "Call on Me". After hearing an early version, Winwood not only gave permission to use his song, but also re-recorded the samples for Prydz to use, to facilitate copyright clearance. The remix spent five weeks at No.1 on the UK Singles Chart.

In 2005, Winwood's Soundstage Performances DVD was released. That same year, he appeared on Grammy Award winner Ashley Cleveland's album Men and Angels Say, a mix of rock, blues and country arrangements of well-known hymns, including "I Need Thee Every Hour", which featured a vocal duet and organ performance. On her 2006 record Back to Basics, Christina Aguilera featured Winwood (using the piano and organ instrumentation from the John Barleycorn Must Die track "Glad") on her song "Makes Me Wanna Pray".

In May 2007, Winwood performed in support of the Countryside Alliance, an organisation opposed to the Hunting Act 2004, in a concert at Highclere Castle, joining fellow rock artists Eric Clapton, Bryan Ferry, Steve Harley and Kenney Jones. In July 2007, Winwood performed with Clapton in the latter's Crossroads Guitar Festival. Among the songs they played were "Presence of the Lord" and "Can't Find My Way Home" from their Blind Faith days, with Winwood playing several guitar leads during a six-song set. The two continued their collaboration with three sold-out nights at Madison Square Garden in New York City in February 2008.

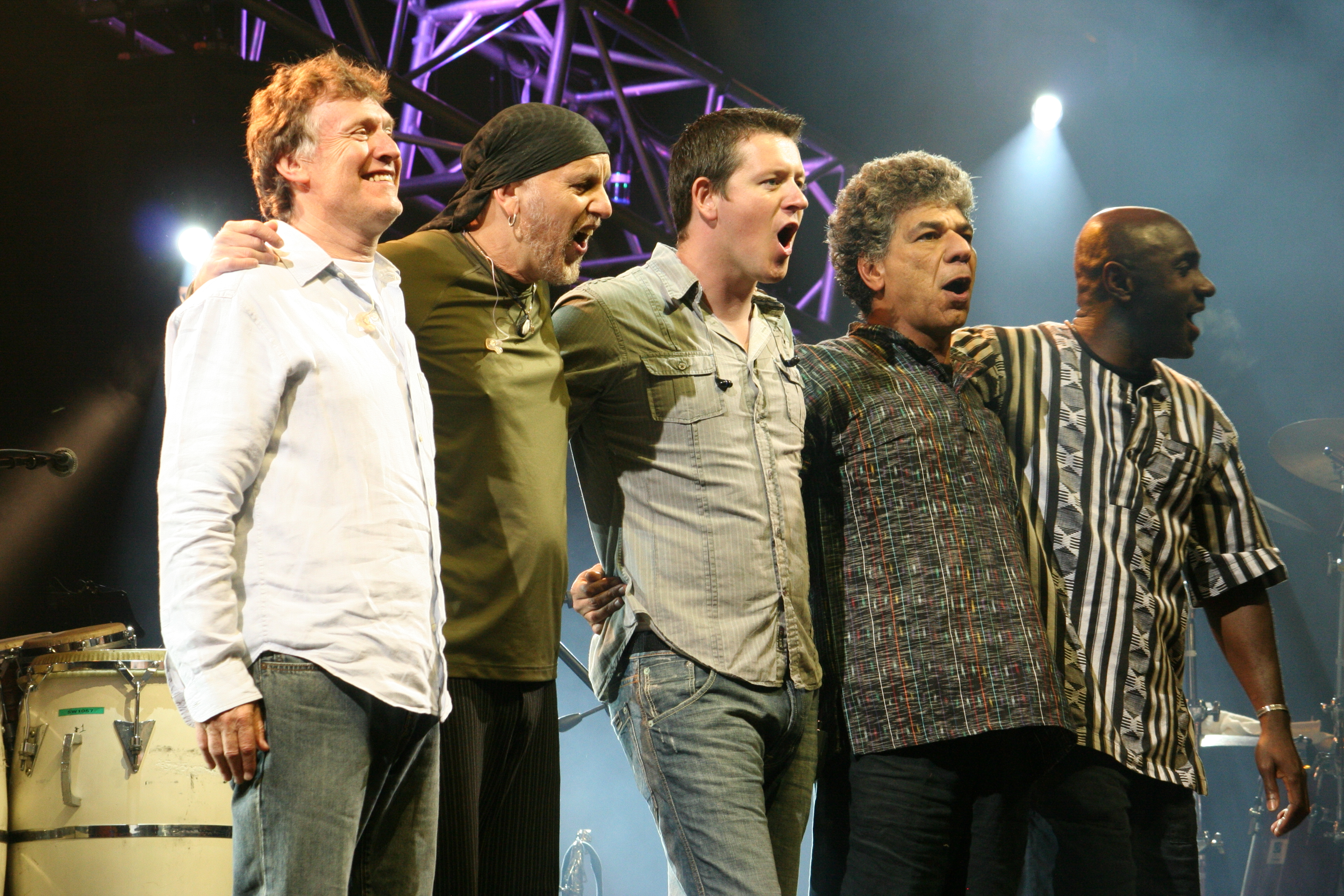
The Steve Winwood band in 2009 on tour

Winwood's next album, Nine Lives, was released in 2008. Nine Lives opened at No.12 on the Billboard 200 album chart, his highest US debut ever. On 19 February 2008, Winwood and Clapton released a collaborative EP through iTunes titled Dirty City. Clapton and Winwood released a CD and DVD of their Madison Square Garden shows and then toured together in the summer of 2009.

In 2008, Winwood was awarded an honorary doctorate from the Berklee College of Music to add to his honorary degree from Aston University, Birmingham.

=== Recent activity ===
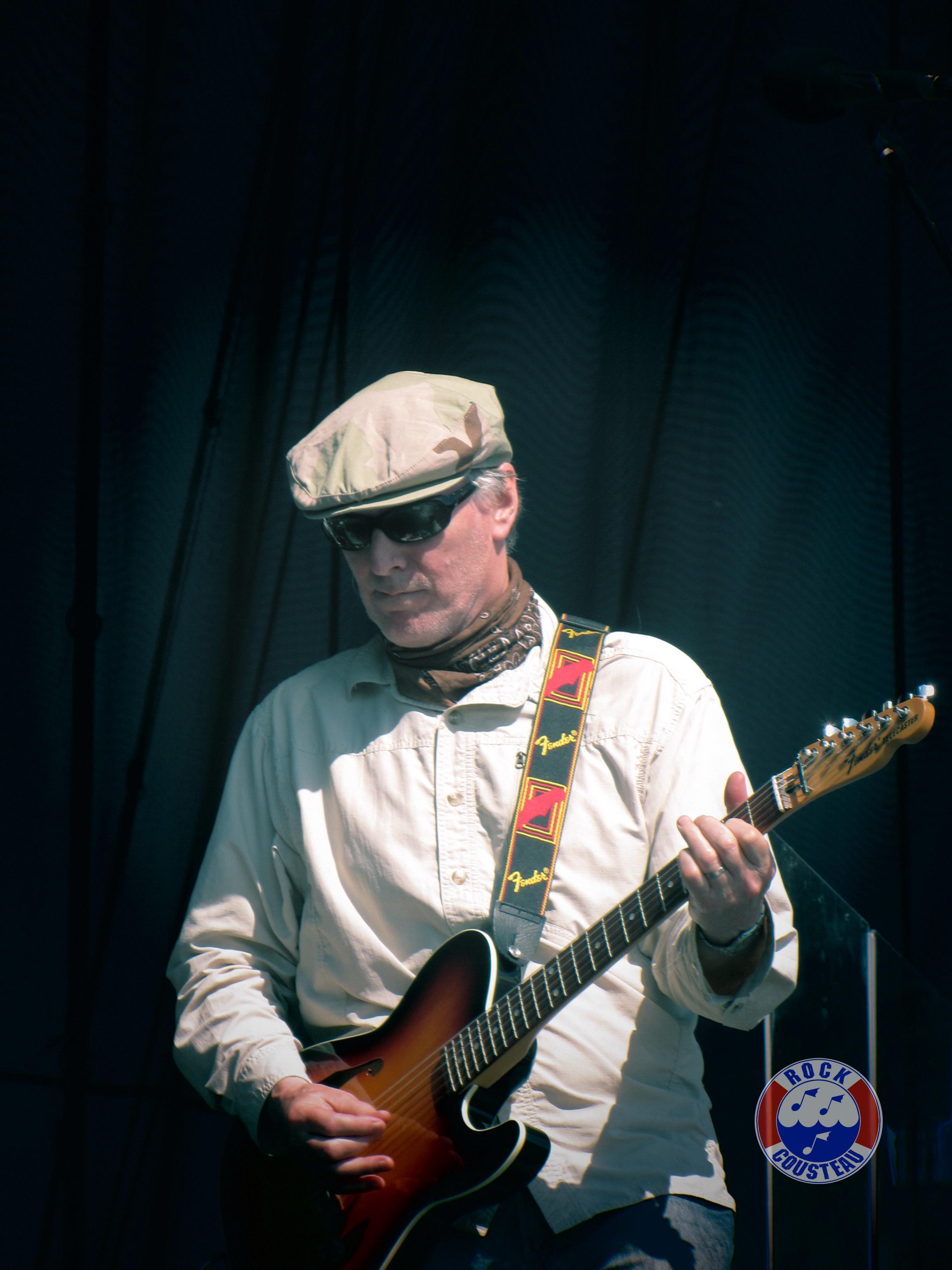
Winwood performing at the Hangout Music Festival in May 2012

On 28 March 2012, Winwood was one of Roger Daltrey's special guest stars for "An Evening with Roger Daltrey and Friends" gig, in aid of the Teenage Cancer Trust at the Royal Albert Hall.

In 2013, Winwood toured North America with Rod Stewart as part of the "Live the Life" tour. In 2014, Winwood toured North America with Tom Petty & the Heartbreakers.

On 17 February 2020, Winwood participated in "A Tribute to Ginger Baker", which took place at Eventim Apollo Hammersmith in London. Other participants were Ronnie Wood, Roger Waters and Eric Clapton. The concert was held in honour of Ginger Baker, his former band member in Blind Faith who had died the previous year.

On 7 May 2023, Winwood performed as part of the Coronation Concert at Windsor Castle where he sang "Higher Love" backed by virtual choirs from the Commonwealth realms.

In 2024 Winwood toured North America with the Doobie Brothers.

Winwood appears on Foreign Tongues, the studio album by The Rolling Stones, which was released on 10 July 2026.

== Songwriting ==
Winwood has spoken very little publicly about the origin or meaning of the songs he has written. He has said that "when I write a song, I don't like to have to explain it afterwards. To me, it's like telling a joke, then having to explain it. The explanation doesn't add to the song at all."

== Legacy ==
Winwood was inducted into the Rock and Roll Hall of Fame as a member of Traffic in 2004. In 2005, Winwood was honoured as a BMI Icon at the annual BMI London Awards for his "enduring influence on generations of music makers." In 2008, Rolling Stone ranked Winwood No.33 on its list of 100 Greatest Singers of All Time. Winwood has won two Grammy Awards.

He was nominated twice for a Brit Award for Best British Male Artist, in 1988 and 1989. In 2011, he received the Ivor Novello Award from the British Academy of Songwriters, Composers and Authors for Outstanding Song Collection.

== Personal life ==
Between 1978 and 1986, Winwood was married to Nicole Weir (d. 2005), who had contributed background vocals to some of his early solo work. The two married at Cheltenham Register Office.

Winwood's primary residence is a 300-year-old manor house in Turkdean in the Cotswolds, where he also has a recording studio. Winwood also has a home in Nashville, Tennessee, with his wife Eugenia Crafton, a Tennessee native whom he married in 1987. They have four children.

In 2011, one of Winwood's daughters, Mary Clare, married businessman Ben Elliot, later co-chairman of the Conservative Party between July 2019 and September 2022. The couple have two sons. Another daughter, Lilly, is a singer; she was featured with Winwood performing a duet of his song "Higher Love" in a Hershey commercial. She was the opening act and was backing singer for her father's 2018 Greatest Hits Live tour.

In June 2025 Winwood was appointed a Member of the Order of the British Empire (MBE) in the King's Birthday Honours for services to music.

== Discography ==
=== Solo ===
- Steve Winwood (1977)
- Arc of a Diver (1980)
- Talking Back to the Night (1982)
- Back in the High Life (1986)
- Roll with It (1988)
- Refugees of the Heart (1990)
- Junction Seven (1997)
- About Time (2003)
- Nine Lives (2008)
- Greatest Hits Live (2017)

=== The Spencer Davis Group ===
- Their First LP (1965)
- The Second Album (1966)
- Autumn '66 (1966)

=== Traffic ===
- Mr. Fantasy (1967)
- Traffic (1968)
- Last Exit (1969)
- John Barleycorn Must Die (1970)
- Welcome to the Canteen (1971)
- The Low Spark of High Heeled Boys (1971)
- Shoot Out at the Fantasy Factory (1973)
- On the Road (1973)
- When the Eagle Flies (1974)
- Far from Home (1994)
- The Last Great Traffic Jam (2005)

=== Blind Faith ===
- Blind Faith (1969)

=== Eric Clapton/Steve Winwood ===
- Live from Madison Square Garden (2009)

=== Ginger Baker's Air Force ===
- Ginger Baker's Air Force (1970)

=== The Third World ===
- Aiye-Keta (1973)

=== Go ===
- GO (1976)
- GO Live from Paris (1976)

=== Session work ===
- The Jimi Hendrix Experience – Electric Ladyland, 1968
- Joe Cocker – With a Little Help from My Friends, 1969
- McDonald and Giles – McDonald and Giles, 1970
- Jimi Hendrix – The Cry of Love, 1971
- B. B. King – B.B. King in London, 1971
- Reg King – Reg King, 1971 – credited as Mystery Man
- Howlin' Wolf – The London Howlin' Wolf Sessions, 1971
- Jim Capaldi – Oh How We Danced, 1972
- London Symphony Orchestra – Tommy – As Performed by the London Symphony Orchestra & Chamber Choir, 1972
- Shawn Phillips – Faces, 1972
- Eddie Harris – E.H. in the U.K., 1973
- Alvin Lee & Mylon LeFevre – On The Road To Freedom, 1973
- John Martyn – Inside Out, 1973
- Lou Reed – Berlin, 1973
- Jim Capaldi – Whale Meat Again, 1974
- Robert Palmer – Sneakin' Sally Through the Alley, 1974
- Vivian Stanshall – Men Opening Umbrellas Ahead, 1974
- Jim Capaldi – Short Cut Draw Blood, 1975
- Jade Warrior – Waves, 1975
- Toots and the Maytals – Reggae Got Soul, 1976
- Sandy Denny – Rendezvous, 1977
- John Martyn – One World, 1977
- Jim Capaldi – Daughter of the Night, 1978
- Pierre Moerlen's Gong – Downwind, 1978
- Vivian Stanshall – Sir Henry at Rawlinson End, 1978
- Marianne Faithfull – Broken English, 1979
- George Harrison – George Harrison, 1979
- Jim Capaldi – The Sweet Smell of... Success, 1980
- Jim Capaldi – Let the Thunder Cry, 1981
- Marianne Faithfull – Dangerous Acquaintances, 1981
- Jim Capaldi – Fierce Heart, 1983
- David Gilmour – About Face, 1984
- Christine McVie – Christine McVie, 1984
- Billy Joel – The Bridge, 1986
- Talk Talk – The Colour of Spring, 1986
- Dave Mason – Two Hearts, 1987
- Jimmy Buffett – Hot Water, 1988
- Jim Capaldi – Some Come Running, 1988
- Phil Collins – ...But Seriously, 1989
- Soulsister – Heat, 1990
- Davy Spillane – A Place Among the Stones, 1994
- Paul Weller – Stanley Road, 1995
- Kathy Troccoli – Corner of Eden, 1998
- Eric Clapton – Back Home, 2005
- Eric Clapton – Clapton, 2010
- Miranda Lambert – Four the Record, 2011
- Eric Clapton – Old Sock, 2013
- Gov't Mule – Shout!, 2013
- Bettye LaVette – LaVette!, 2023
- The Rolling Stones - Foreign Tongues, 2026

== See also ==
- List of British Grammy winners and nominees
