= Don't You Know What the Night Can Do? =

Single by Steve Winwood

from the album Roll with It
- B-side: "Don't You Know What the Night Can Do?" (instrumental)
- Released: August 1988
- Genre: Pop, rock
- Length: 4:25 (single remix); 6:54 (album version)
- Label: Virgin
- Songwriters: Steve Winwood, Will Jennings
- Producers: Steve Winwood, Tom Lord-Alge

Steve Winwood singles chronology
"Put on Your Dancing Shoes" (1988)	"Don't You Know What the Night Can Do?" (1988)	"Holding On" (1988)

"Don't You Know What the Night Can Do?" is a song recorded by Steve Winwood for his album, Roll with It, released on Virgin Records in 1988. Released as a single, it peaked at number six on the US Billboard Hot 100 chart and spent two weeks at number one on the Billboard Hot Mainstream Rock Tracks chart.

== Background and use in Michelob commercial ==
Prior to the 1988 release of the "Don't You Know What the Night Can Do?" single, the song was used in a national TV commercial for Michelob. Though some critics at the time condemned Winwood for "writing songs for business interests" (i.e., "selling out"), Winwood denied that the song had been written for the commercial. In the 27 August issue of Billboard, Winwood's manager, Ron Weisner, said that Winwood granted Michelob use of the song to obtain tour sponsorship. In the 1 December issue of Rolling Stone, Weisner reiterated that the song was written before the deal with Michelob was struck. In a 1990 biography, Winwood explained: "When [the album] was finished, but before it came out, [Michelob] took the song they wanted, and very quickly shot the commercial. So what happened was the commercial came out before the album. Then the LP was released and the first single which was 'Roll With It'. Six weeks later the second single was due to be released which was the song they used for the commercial. They started putting the commercial on the TV before the single was out. It looked like I had written a beer jingle!"

== Release and commercial reception ==
"Don't You Know What the Night Can Do?" was released in 1988 as the second international single from Roll With It. In the United States, the song peaked at number six on the Billboard Hot 100, becoming his 6th and last top 10 hit, and spent 11 weeks inside the Top 40. It reached number six on the Hot 100 Airplay chart and number eight on the Singles Sales chart. It also reached number two on the Adult Contemporary chart and spent two weeks atop the Hot Mainstream Rock Tracks chart. The song peaked at number 46 in New Zealand and number 89 in the United Kingdom.

== Track listing ==
7" Vinyl

No.	Title	Writer(s)	Length
1.	"Don't You Know What the Night Can Do? (single edit)"	Steve Winwood, Will Jennings	4:25
2.	"Don't You Know What the Night Can Do? (instrumental)"	Winwood, Jennings	4:07

=== Credits ===
- Steve Winwood – lead and backing vocals, keyboards, Fairlight programming
- Mike Lawler – additional keyboards
- John Robinson – drums
- Bashiri Johnson – percussion
- Tessa Niles – backing vocals
- Mark Williamson – backing vocals

== Charts ==
=== Weekly charts ===
Chart (1988)	Peak position
Canada Top Singles (RPM)	2
Italy Airplay (Music & Media)	12
New Zealand (RIANZ)	46
UK Singles (Official Charts Company)	89
US Billboard Hot 100	6
US Adult Contemporary (Billboard)	2
US Album Rock Tracks (Billboard)	1

=== Year-end charts ===
Chart (1988)	Position
US Billboard Hot 100	88
