= Hearts on Fire (Steve Winwood song) =

Single by Steve Winwood

from the album Roll with It
- B-side: Hearts on Fire (Instrumental)
- Released: 1989
- Genre: R&B, blue-eyed soul, rock
- Length: 4:07 (7" remix); 5:15 (album version)
- Label: Virgin
- Songwriters: Steve Winwood; Jim Capaldi
- Producers: Steve Winwood; Tom Lord-Alge

Steve Winwood singles chronology
"Holding On" (1988)	"Hearts on Fire" (1989)	"One and Only Man" (1990)

"Hearts on Fire" is a 1989 single by Steve Winwood from the album Roll with It. The song is about him meeting his second wife Eugenia; it was co-written with Winwood's past and future Traffic bandmate Jim Capaldi.

== Credits ==
- Steve Winwood – lead vocals, Hammond organ, Fairlight programming
- Mike Lawler – keyboards
- Paul Pesco – guitar
- John Robinson – drums
- The Memphis Horns
  - Wayne Jackson – trombone and trumpet
  - Andrew Love – tenor saxophone
- Tessa Niles – backing vocals
- Mark Williamson – backing vocals

== Charts ==
Chart (1988–1989)	Peak position
Canada Top Singles (RPM)	41
Italy Airplay (Music & Media)	13
US Billboard Hot 100	53
