= Roll with It =

Roll with It may refer to:

- Roll with It (album), an album by Steve Winwood
- "Roll with It" (Easton Corbin song)
- "Roll with It" (Steve Winwood song)
- "Roll with It" (Oasis song)
- "Roll with It", a song by the Steve Miller Band from Children of the Future
- "Roll with It", a song by Marc Mysterio
- "Roll with It", a song by Ani Difranco
- "Roll with It", a song by Backstreet Boys from their eponymous debut album
