= Freedom Overspill =

- Cover art for UK and non-US editions

Single by Steve Winwood

from the album Back in the High Life
- B-side: "Help Me Angel"
- Released: August 1986
- Recorded: Autumn 1985
- Studio: Unique Recording Studio, New York City
- Genre: Dance-rock, blue-eyed soul, funk rock
- Length: 5:33 (album version); 4:09 (single version)
- Label: Island - IS 294
- Songwriters: Steve Winwood, George Fleming, James Hooker
- Producer: Russ Titelman

Steve Winwood singles chronology
| "Higher Love" (1986) | "Freedom Overspill" (1986) | "Back in the High Life Again" (1986) |

Professional ratings
Review scores
| Source | Rating |
|---|---|
| Number One | 2/5 stars |

"Freedom Overspill" is a 1986 song by Steve Winwood that reached number 20 on the Billboard Hot 100 pop chart. It was the second single released from his fourth solo album, Back in the High Life. It was produced by Russ Titelman and Winwood. James Hooker, Winwood's touring keyboard player and a former member of the Amazing Rhythm Aces, was credited with co-writing the song with Winwood and George Fleming.

It appeared in the 1987 Ridley Scott film Someone to Watch Over Me, as well as the 1987 film Big Shots.

== Critical reception ==
Number One magazine said that "Freedom Overspill" was a "harmless enough song" and felt that it could have benefited from "slightly less perfect production". Cashbox opined that the song was less overtly commercial than the previous single on the album, "Higher Love", but believed that it would still perform well on various radio formats, particularly on contemporary hit radio. Billboard thought that the song evoked some of Winwood's "Stax/Volt influences that animated the Spencer Davis Group in his early performing days".

== Track listing ==
7": Island / IS 294 United Kingdom

1. "Freedom Overspill" - 4:09
2. "Spanish Dancer" - 3:07

7": Island / 7-28595 United States

1. "Freedom Overspill" - 4:09
2. "Help Me Angel" - 5:06

12": Island / 12 IS 294 United Kingdom

1. "Freedom Overspill" (Remix) - 8:30
2. "Freedom Overspill" - 5:33
3. "Spanish Dancer" 5:56
- Track 1 remixed by Steve Thompson and Michael Barbiero

12": Island / 0-20537 United States

1. "Freedom Overspill" (Remix) - 7:30
2. "Freedom Overspill" (Dub) - 6:00
3. "Higher Love" (Remix) 7:45
4. "Help Me Angel" - 5:06
- Tracks 1 and 2 remixed by Steve Thompson and Michael Barbiero
- Track 3 remixed by Tom Lord-Alge

== Personnel ==
- Steve Winwood – vocals, Hammond organ, synth bass, drum machine programming, sequencer programming
- Robbie Kilgore – synthesizer and sequencer programming
- Joe Walsh – slide guitar
- Eddie Martinez – rhythm guitar
- Jimmy Bralower – additional drum machine programming
- Steve Ferrone – drums
- Carole Steele – percussion
- Lewis Del Gatto – baritone and tenor saxophones
- Bob Mintzer – tenor saxophone
- George Young – alto saxophone
- Tom Malone – trombone
- Randy Brecker – trumpet
- David Frank – horn arrangements

== Charts ==
| Chart (1986) | Peak position |
|---|---|
| Canada Top Singles (RPM) | 39 |
| UK Singles (Official Charts) | 69 |
| US Billboard Hot 100 | 20 |
| US Mainstream Rock (Billboard) | 4 |
