= Holding On (Steve Winwood song) =

Single by Steve Winwood

from the album Roll with It
- B-side: Holding On (Instrumental)
- Released: November 1988
- Genre: R&B, blue-eyed soul, rock
- Length: 4:15 (single edit); 6:14 (album version)
- Label: Virgin
- Songwriter(s): Steve Winwood; Will Jennings
- Producer(s): Steve Winwood and Tom Lord-Alge

Steve Winwood singles chronology
"Roll with It" (1988)	"Holding On" (1988)	"Hearts on Fire" (1988)

"Holding On" is a 1988 single by Steve Winwood from the album Roll with It. The song was written by Winwood along with Will Jennings. "Holding On" was the last of four number ones for Winwood on the Adult Contemporary chart. The single went to number one for two weeks and peaked at number 11 on the Billboard Hot 100.

== Music video ==
The music video (directed by David Fincher) opens with an unidentified photographer taking out camera equipment. The rest of the video is shown in motion, with flashes indicating candid snapshots of various people from different walks of life: people walking on the street, patrons of a diner, women in formal dress, a dinner suggesting an underworld boss and his girlfriend (although they pose for the camera, others cover their faces or move to leave the table), a soldier just home from the war (presumed to be World War II) embracing his son, and an elderly couple in high spirits on a park bench.

Interspersed with these images are occasional scenes of Winwood playing solitaire in his room, then going out for a walk, having his shoes shined, having coffee at a diner, then finally returning to his room and lying on his bed as the sun shines through his window.

== Charts ==
=== Weekly charts ===
Chart (1989)	Peak position
Canada Top Singles (RPM)	3
US Billboard Hot 100	11
US Adult Contemporary (Billboard)	1

=== Year-end charts ===
Chart (1989)	Position
Canada Top Singles (RPM)	47

== Credits ==
- Steve Winwood – lead vocals, keyboards, Hammond organ, Fairlight programming, guitar
- Robbie Kilgore – additional keyboards
- Mike Lawler – additional keyboards
- John Robinson – drums
- Bashiri Johnson – percussion
- The Memphis Horns
  - Wayne Jackson – trombone and trumpet
  - Andrew Love – tenor saxophone
- Tessa Niles – backing vocals
- Mark Williamson – backing vocals
