= Deep Into It =

Studio album by Larry Carlton
- Released: 2001
- Genre: Smooth jazz
- Length: 55:00
- Label: Warner Bros.
- Producer: Larry Carlton, Paul Brown

Deep Into It is an album released by Larry Carlton in 2001. "I Can't Tell You Why" was originally recorded by Eagles in 1979. "Roll with It" was originally recorded by Steve Winwood in 1988.

== Track listing ==
All tracks by Larry Carlton except where noted

1. "Put It Where You Want It" (Larry Carlton, Joe Sample) – 4:15
2. "Deep into It" (Larry Carlton, Carl Burnett) – 4:20
3. Don't Break My Heart" (Larry Carlton, Carl Burnett) – 4:00
4. "I Still Believe (feat. Wendy Molten)" (Christopher Bolden / J.B. Eckl)– 4:00
5. " Morning Magic" (Larry Carlton, Carl Burnett)– 4:17
6. "It's a Groove Thang" – 4:45
7. "Closer to Home" – 3:48
8. "I Can't Tell You Why (feat. Shai)" (Glenn Frey / Don Henley / Timothy B. Schmit) – 4:27
9. "Like Butta'" – 5:07
10. "Roll with It" (Brian Holland / Will Jennings / Steve Winwood) – 5:23
11. "Put It Where You Want It" [Extended Version] (Bonus Track) (Larry Carlton, Joe Sample) – 10:38

== Personnel ==
- Larry Carlton - guitar, arrangements
- Chris Kent - bass (1/11, 6, 7, 9)
- Larry Kimpel - bass (4, 10)
- Ricky Peterson - organ (1/11); keyboards (4, 10); piano (7); Rhodes electric piano, organ (9)
- Deron Johnson - organ (2)
- Rick Jackson - Wurlitzer electric piano (1/11); keyboards (6); Rhodes electric piano (7); piano (9)
- Carl Burnett - keyboards, programming (2, 5); drum programming, bass, rhythm guitar (2)
- Rex Rideout - keyboards, drum programming (3)
- Larry Williams - add. keyboards (4–9); flute (5); saxophone (5, 10)
- Billy Kilson - drums (1/11, 6, 7, 9)
- Harvey Mason - drums (4, 10)
- Paulinho da Costa - percussion (1/11, 6, 7, 9)
- Lenny Castro - percussion (3, 4, 5, 10)
- Chris Potter - saxophone (1/11, 6, 7, 9)
- Kirk Whalum - saxophone (2, 10)
- Dan Higgins - saxophone (6, 9)
- Jerry Hey - flugelhorn (5); trumpet (6, 9, 10); horns arrangement (10)
- Bill Reichenbach - trombone (6, 9)
- Andy Martin - trombone (10)
- Wendy Moten - vocals (4)
- Shai - vocals, keyboards, drum programming (8)
- Carl Carwell - background vocals (4)
- Sue Ann Carwell - background vocals (4)

=== Producers ===
- Paul Brown - Engineer, Mixing, Producer
- Jerry Hey - Additional Production
- Rex Rideout - Additional Production
- Drew Bollman- Engineer
- Jennifer Brown - Sequencing
- Carl Burnett - Arrangement
- Koji Egawa - Digital Editing, Engineer
- Steve Genewick - Engineer
- Stephen Marcussen - Mastering
- Mark Larson - Art Direction, Design
- Stewart Whitmore -Digital Editing
- Lexy Shroyer - Production Coordination
- Señor McGuire - Photography
- David Rideau - Engineer
