= Back in the High Life =

1986 studio album by Steve Winwood

Studio album by Steve Winwood
- Released: 30 June 1986
- Recorded: August 1985 – May 1986
- Studios: Unique Recording, New York City; Power Station, New York City; Right Track, New York City; Giant Sound, New York City; Netherturkdonic, Turkdean
- Genres: Pop; rock; R&B; blue-eyed soul
- Length: 45:33
- Label: Island
- Producers: Russ Titelman, Steve Winwood

Steve Winwood chronology
Talking Back to the Night (1982)	Back in the High Life (1986)	Chronicles (1987)

Singles from Back in the High Life
- 1. "Higher Love" Released: 20 June 1986; 2. "Split Decision" Released: July 1986; 3. "Take It As It Comes" Released: August 1986; 4. "Freedom Overspill" Released: August 1986; 5. "Back in the High Life Again" Released: 22 November 1986; 6. "The Finer Things" Released: February 1987

Back in the High Life is the fourth solo album by the English singer, songwriter, and multi-instrumentalist Steve Winwood, released on 30 June 1986. The album proved to be Winwood's biggest success to that date, certified Gold in the UK and 3× Platinum in the US, and it reached the top twenty in most Western countries. It collected three Grammy Awards and generated five hit singles, starting with "Higher Love", which became Winwood's first Billboard Hot 100 number-one chart topper, coming twenty years after he first entered that chart with "Keep on Running" by the Spencer Davis Group. Other global hit singles from the album were "Freedom Overspill", "Back in the High Life Again" and "The Finer Things". The single "Split Decision", with ex-Eagles guitarist Joe Walsh, was also a hit on US rock stations.

Musically, the album was polished and sophisticated, representative of pop production in the 1980s, featuring Winwood's style of layered synthesisers and electronic drums that he had established with Arc of a Diver (1980). Unlike his two prior albums, on which he played every instrument himself, Winwood made extensive use of other musicians for this album, including Joe Walsh and Nile Rodgers on guitars and JR Robinson on drums. Winwood himself also performed on a large number of instruments, combining live-played instruments with synthesisers and programming. Prominent backing vocals were provided by established stars, including Chaka Khan on "Higher Love", James Ingram on "Finer Things", and James Taylor on the title track. The album showcased Winwood's lifelong fascination with the fusion of styles, bringing folk, gospel and Caribbean sounds into a rock, pop and R&B milieu.

The album was recorded and released during a time of significant change in Winwood's personal life. After touring North America to promote the album during August–November 1986, Winwood divorced in England and then married in New York City. He bought a second home in Nashville, where he organized his next project, Chronicles, a retrospective album of earlier songs, including some remixes engineered by Tom Lord-Alge, whom Winwood had befriended in the making of Back in the High Life.

== Background ==
Winwood's solo career had seen success in the UK with Steve Winwood in 1977 and Arc of a Diver in 1980, the latter being his first major solo US hit, reaching number 3 on the Billboard 200. His third album, Talking Back to the Night (1982), generated less of a response and was considered a let-down. The last two albums had been created by Winwood playing all the instruments himself at his technologically advanced Turkdean home studio "Netherturkdonic," but for his next project Winwood returned to working with other musicians for additional inspiration. He hired Los Angeleno Ron Weisner as manager, known for his work with Michael Jackson. Weisner pushed Winwood to record in London rather than at his home, where he was having relationship difficulties with his wife, Nicole. Winwood agreed to the London suggestion, but Weisner responded, "Well, forget London. Maybe you should go to New York."

Winwood was already acquainted with New York, having stayed at the Central Park South apartment of Chris Blackwell, the founder of Island Records. Blackwell had been serving as Winwood's quasi-manager for a few years, but Winwood was intent on moving in a new direction with Weisner. Weisner encouraged him to stop standing half-hidden behind the Hammond organ and accept his position as front man and entertainer. Winwood said in 1988, "I made a conscious effort to start working with musicians and producers and engineers. I got a manager. I have to say that those people are directly or indirectly responsible for my success now." Between sessions for Back in the High Life, Winwood booked another studio, where he scored synthesiser-based music for the documentary The High Life, about the 1985 Tour de France experience of Scottish bicycle racer Robert Millar (later known as Philippa York). The documentary was produced by ITV Granada; it aired in the weeks leading up to the 1986 Tour de France, in which Millar competed.

== Writing ==
Songwriting for the album began after Talking Back was released. Winwood wrote his own music but he usually relied on other lyricists. He collaborated again with Texan Will Jennings, a professor of English who had written the words to Winwood's song "While You See a Chance", a hit single in 1981. For this new project, Winwood's fourth solo album, the pair composed five more songs, two of which would become the biggest album hits: "Higher Love" and "Back in the High Life Again". Jennings carried the phrase "Back in the High Life" around as a song title idea written down in a notebook, but when he was at Winwood's house in late 1984 he wrote the rest of the lyric in half an hour, without any music. More than a year afterward, Winwood finally wrote the music, after being nudged to do so by Titelman, who was notified of its existence by Jennings. "Back in the High Life Again" came very near to being missed altogether. Winwood said about teaming with Jennings, "We've got absolutely no rules when we work together. Sometimes we start with the lyric, sometimes with the melody; sometimes we start with chorus and add the verses, and sometimes I write some of the lyrics myself. There are no formulas; things just happen naturally."

A second return collaborator was eccentric English songwriter and former Bonzo Dog Doo-Dah Band front man Vivian Stanshall, who had written the words for Winwood's "Dream Gerrard", appearing on Traffic's 1974 album When the Eagle Flies. The two often traded favours: Winwood played on both of Stanshall's solo albums in the 1970s. More recently, Stanshall had come up with the lyric to the song "Arc of a Diver", which provided the 1980 album title. Stanshall joined with Winwood to create a demo version of "My Love's Leavin'" at Netherturkdonic, engineered by Nobby Clarke, who was Winwood's right-hand man at the studio and on the road. Stanshall also wrote the lyric to "If That Gun's For Real" in the early '80s, described by Winwood as a witty "Percy Sledge–flavoured" number. The song was under consideration for Back in the High Life but was ultimately left off.

The third returning lyricist was George Fleming, an old friend of Winwood's and the nephew of James Bond creator Ian Fleming. George Fleming had written two songs for Arc of a Diver – "Second-hand Woman" and "Dust" – which were his first-ever compositions. In 1985, he brought Winwood the words for "Freedom Overspill". Winwood wrote most of the music for "Freedom Overspill", with significant contribution from ex–Amazing Rhythm Ace James Hooker, an American keyboard player who toured in Winwood's band starting in 1983.

== Recording ==
=== Power Station, Right Track Recording, and Giant Sound sessions ===
"The timing was right. Stevie was ready to try something different. He had been working on tracks for about a year and some of the songs were demoed pretty seriously. I wasn't brought in for any drastic changes. I think he might have wanted to take some responsibility off his own shoulders."
—Russ Titelman on being selected as co-producer

In July 1985, Winwood settled into New York City for August recording sessions at Power Station, getting an apartment off Madison Avenue near Central Park Zoo. Russ Titelman was chosen to co-produce the album because he was already familiar with Winwood's keyboard work on Titelman's earlier productions George Harrison (1979) and Christine McVie (1984). Titelman had also produced the Rufus/Chaka Khan song "Ain't Nobody", which won the artists a performance Grammy in 1984, and was one of Weisner's favourite songs, aiding in the selection of Titelman. Tracking began in Studio C at Power Station under engineer Jason Corsaro, with Winwood laying down drum machine, synth bass, and some vocal and instrument tracks. Drummer Jimmy Bralower assisted with the programming of electronic drums, even going to Winwood's apartment to work out the sequencing for "Back in the High Life Again", featuring a conga loop devised by Bralower on the Roland TR-808. Corsaro also engineered sessions at Right Track Recording. When Corsaro had to leave to honour a commitment with Fleetwood Mac, Titelman moved the project to Giant Sound for a couple of weeks in October.

=== The Lord-Alge brothers' involvement and Unique sessions ===
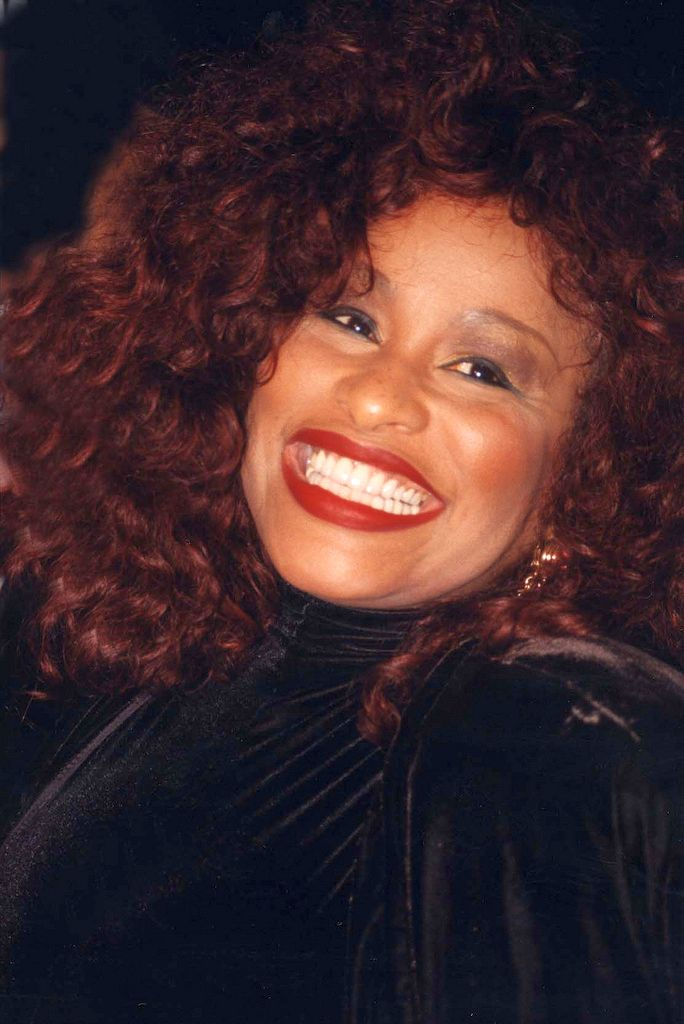
Chaka Khan sang background vocals on "Higher Love"

Session keyboard player Robbie Kilgore told Winwood and Titelman that he knew three talented brothers who engineered at a nearby studio with a wide selection of synthesisers: the brothers Chris, Jeff and Tom Lord-Alge at Unique Recording Studios. Kilgore took Titelman to Unique, where they discovered that the studio also had an SSL 4000E mixer just like Winwood's at Netherturkdonic, so Titelman moved the project there in early November 1985. Titelman was immediately impressed by the speed of Chris Lord-Alge. Winwood was delighted with all the choices of synthesiser, playing on them during all-night jam sessions in which he invited any interested musicians to join him. In the end, he stuck with a few favourite keyboards, including the familiar Hammond B3, a Minimoog, a Yamaha DX7, and a Roland Juno-60.

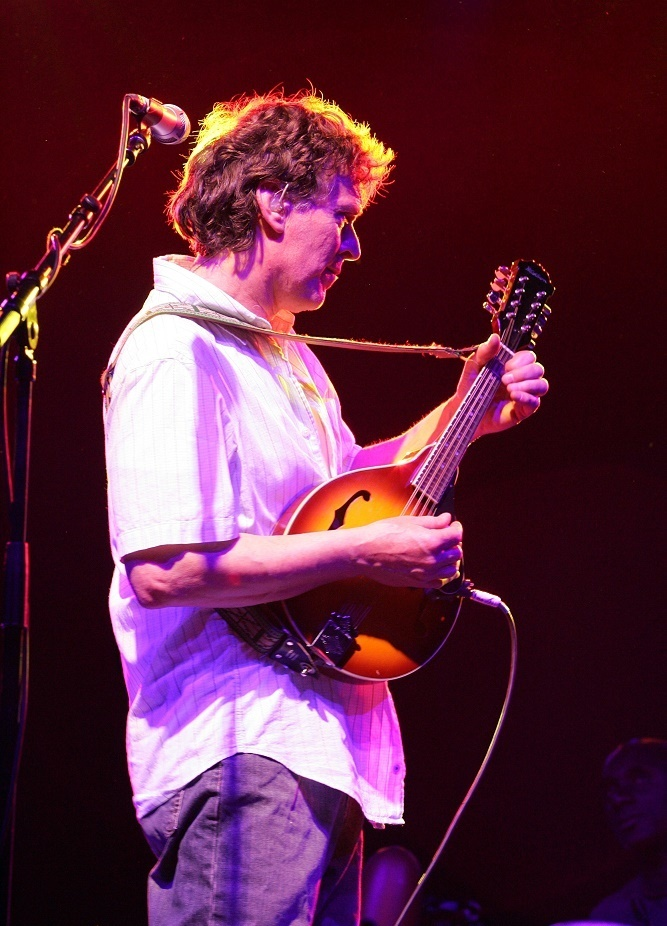
For the title track of the album, multi-instrumentalist Steve Winwood incorporated mandolin (pictured) along with piano, synth bass and a synth solo

Chris Lord-Alge was the more accomplished of the three engineer brothers, but he had been pushing Tom into positions of greater responsibility; Tom earned his way to become head engineer on the Winwood album, his first time in the role.

Back in the High Life was mixed through May 1986 by Tom Lord-Alge in Unique's Studio B on the 48-channel SSL 4000E. A pair of linked 24-track tape recorders was initially mixed down to stereo on a Studer A-80 half-inch 2-track deck. At one point the analogue Studer stopped working and the mix-down was shifted to a digital Mitsubishi X-80 open-reel 2-track recorder. The greater sonic clarity achieved this way was profound enough for Titelman and Winwood to decide that the whole album must be mixed to digital stereo. Tom said that Winwood taught him a few tricks on the SSL, and Tom returned the favour by showing Winwood a trick or two of his own. Titelman said Tom "uses the SSL like a player uses an instrument". According to Tom, between 10 and 20 percent of the Power Station and other previous tracks ended up on the album. The great majority of Back in the High Life came from overdubbing at Unique.

=== Drums ===
Once Winwood settled in at Unique, Titelman decided to bring in a real drummer to augment or replace the drum machine parts. On tape, the album already had Roland, LinnDrum and Simmons electronic drum sounds, but these were not setting the right tone for many of the songs. Session drummer John "JR" Robinson was called in from a nearby George Benson session, bringing his own drum equipment. JR had already worked with Titelman on Rufus and Chaka Khan dates, and he had many hit records under his belt, including the charity single "We Are the World" and Michael Jackson's multi-Platinum "Don't Stop 'Til You Get Enough". To get a larger-than-life drum sound, Titelman and the Lord-Alge brothers had the drums placed in the center of the main room of Studio B, with eight additional microphones positioned around the room to capture sound-wave reflections and increase the ratio of room ambience.

"Higher Love" was first tracked with a simple drum machine loop, which Titelman felt was "flat", not quite fitting with the synth layers, which had been created mainly by Kilgore. Titelman tried replacing all the electronic drums with JR playing live, but the producers felt that this, too, was not quite suitable. Instead, the rhythm part for the song was constructed as a combination of electronic drums, JR's live drums, and sequenced samples of JR's drums added later. Winwood instructed JR to make the snare overdubs feel like they were slightly rushing the tempo, to add excitement. JR noted that Winwood asked for high-pitched, bright sounds from the drum kit, so he chose brass snares such as a vintage 1930 Ludwig for "Split Decision", and the vintage Black Beauty on "Higher Love". JR tuned his drumheads high to satisfy Winwood, unlike another of JR's bandleaders, Bob Seger, who wanted only low-pitched drums. Real drums augmented or replaced the electronic drums on every song on the album except "My Love's Leavin'", on which the drum parts stayed purely electronic.

==== "Higher Love" drum-fill ====
"Higher Love"
The opening drum solo of "Higher Love", composed and performed by John "JR" Robinson. To get the metallic, ringing timbale-like sound, JR choked up on the drum stick and played rim-shots in a Latin music pattern on his brass snare drum.

Tom says he "clinched the gig" when he made a suggestion to Titelman as the overdubbing was winding down and mixing was soon to begin. The suggestion involved Tom moving one of JR's impromptu drum fills to the beginning of "Higher Love", by assigning a timing offset to one of two tape machines such that they first played the drum fill followed by the song coming in on the beat. Titelman was very happy with the result, and decided to open the album with this drum fill. The opening eventually became so famous that JR put it on his answering machine as a professional calling card. JR said the pattern was a Latin rim-shot technique across the top of his classic seamless brass Ludwig Black Beauty snare, unmuffled, with its snare wires disengaged, to emulate the sound of a timbale. He said, "it's one of the best drum intros I've ever played."

Titelman remembered the fill being played ad lib by JR while his friend Chaka Khan was preparing to sing her background vocals on "Higher Love", causing Khan to exclaim "What is that shit? It sounds like voodoo shit!" Tom Lord-Alge agreed that the drum fill was played as a lark after JR had completed his drum overdubs for "Higher Love". Tom said, "It was one of those happy accidents, and it happened because Chris always taught me that if the tape is rolling and there's a musician in the studio, make sure the tape machine is in record!"

=== Notable collaborators ===
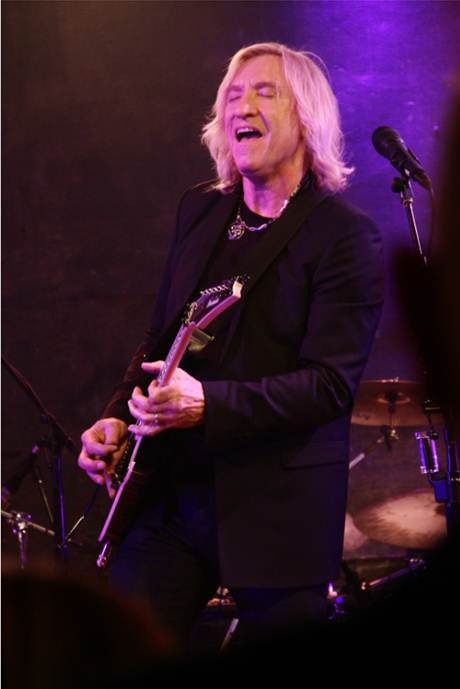
Joe Walsh co-wrote "Split Decision" with Winwood

Titelman tapped James Taylor to add background vocals to "Back in the High Life Again", after hearing the slowed-down Winwood and Bralower version. Titelman felt that the song fit Taylor's style perfectly. Another Titelman decision was to call Nile Rodgers to handle a guitar solo in "Wake Me Up on Judgment Day", for which Winwood wanted an interpretation different from his own. Chaka Khan, JR and drummer Mickey Curry were all Titelman's contacts. Titelman also brought in David Frank for his experience at turning out synthesiser horn parts. Titelman said, "I feel that basically I was a casting director in a lot of ways." But Winwood himself invited Eagles guitarist Joe Walsh to join the project. Walsh and Winwood had met during Walsh's James Gang years. More than a decade later Walsh phoned "out of the blue" to say hello, with Winwood immediately suggesting a songwriting collaboration. In October, the two wrote "Split Decision" together, the only song on the album written entirely during the recording process in New York. Walsh also performed slide guitar on "Freedom Overspill". Walsh tackled his electric guitar solo for "Split Decision" in a wholly unrehearsed performance – his usual style. Winwood felt challenged to do the same on synthesiser.

== Marketing and video ==
Back in the High Life was a Top 10 hit on the album charts in the United States, peaking at number 3, and has sold over five million copies. The single "Higher Love" first entered the US charts at number 77 during the week of 14 June 1986, then proceeded to top the singles chart at the end of August and win the Grammy Award for "Record of the Year"; "Back in the High Life Again" (US number 13), "The Finer Things" (US number 8, the second-biggest hit from the album), and "Freedom Overspill" (US number 20) were also big hits. "Split Decision" failed to chart in other countries but rose to number 3 on rock radio in the US. "Take It As It Comes" reached number 33 on U.S. rock radio. Island had promoted Back in the High Life successfully, basing the campaign on the idea that Winwood was on a "comeback".

A screenshot from the "Higher Love" video shows Winwood and Chaka Khan captured in motion, on black-and-white film in a hand-held camera.

Weisner pushed Winwood to promote the album with at least one video that could be shown on MTV. Island Records agreed. They chose "Higher Love", and selected Peter Kagan and Paula Greif to direct it, on the strength of their video for "The Love Parade" by the Dream Academy. Weisner relayed his wish that Winwood should look like an entertainer, that he should not hide behind the Hammond as in the past. Shooting took place in June 1986, primarily on 35 mm film stock, but sometimes using a hand-held camera, especially for black-and-white photography. One 16 mm Bolex and a Super 8 camera were used for these in-motion shots. Riding in a shopping trolley, Greif was pushed through the dance floor to capture movement. Laura Israel and Glenn Lazzaro edited the film to U-matic video, then mastered to 1-inch tape with a team of assistants. In the resulting video, Winwood is never shown playing an instrument. Instead, he sings far out in front of the band, he stands next to Chaka Khan, and he dances with several women wearing tropical clothing as different scenes change from colour to black-and-white. Nile Rodgers plays electric guitar in the band, wearing a vivid duster. At the 1987 MTV Video Music Awards, "Higher Love" was nominated for Video of the Year, Best Male Video, Best Editing, and Best Direction, but lost to Peter Gabriel's "Sledgehammer" in all four categories. The video was also nominated for Best Choreography, honouring Ed Love's work with the dancers, and it was nominated for Best Cinematography, crediting Kagan. "Higher Love" was nominated in the Viewers Choice category, which was won by U2's "With or Without You".

== Tour ==
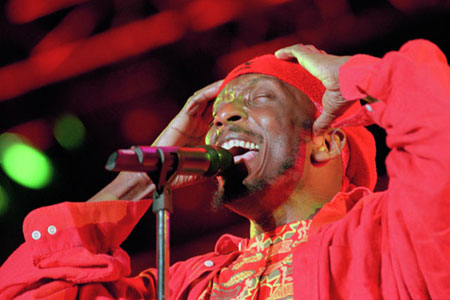
Jimmy Cliff opened for Winwood's tour

Winwood began a tour of North America to promote the album, starting on 22 August 1986 with a show at Pine Knob Music Theatre north of Detroit, with reggae artist Jimmy Cliff as the opening act. In Winwood's eight-piece band, James Hooker, co-writer of "Freedom Overspill", continued in his role as second keyboard player. Winwood's man in Turkdean, Nobby Clarke, resumed as road manager. The tour played dates in Ohio, Illinois, Maryland, New York, Pennsylvania, Massachusetts, Florida, Georgia, Tennessee and Arkansas. In October when he was "somewhere" in Texas, Winwood told the Los Angeles Times that he was seeing the largest audience reactions on the songs "Higher Love" and "Gimme Some Lovin'" (1966) – his "newest and oldest songs." He imagined that some of the younger audience members might be thinking "Gimme Some Lovin'" was a Blues Brothers cover because it had been in the film The Blues Brothers (1980).

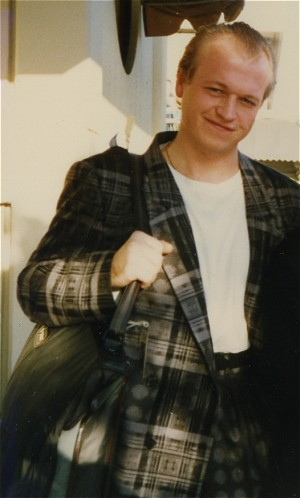
Mark King of Level 42

After Texas, Winwood played Colorado and Arizona, where English band Level 42 became the opening act. Their 1985 World Machine album had brought greater fame and introduced more electronic and pop elements to their sound. The Arizona Republic remarked about how well they fit with Winwood's style, both sharing a "multilayered instrumentation and a prominent beat." The tour continued through four dates in California, the fourth at the Concord Pavilion, where the San Francisco Examiner reviewed the show, noting that Winwood played very little guitar and a bit of mandolin, and performed his electric guitar solos on the keyboards to strike a "balance between his instruments and voice." Danny Wolinski on saxophone and Bob Leffert on trumpet were named as "outstanding" musicians. Winwood started the concert softly with "The Low Spark of High Heeled Boys", then finished big with "Back in the High Life Again".

Level 42 and Winwood's band moved up the Pacific Coast to Oregon and Washington, crossing into Canada for one night in British Columbia, and another in Alberta. They headed east to play nine more dates in the US plus one in Toronto. The tour ended on 23 November in Virginia at the Patriot Center. Not every show enjoyed good reviews: Rock critic Frank Rizzo in the Hartford Courant was unimpressed by Winwood in Connecticut's New Haven Coliseum, describing how most of the two-hour show was "less than captivating" because of Winwood's shyness onstage. Rizzo felt that a few hot solos from the band, and a rousing final number that got the crowd standing for "Gimme Some Lovin'", were not enough to make the show worthwhile. A month later, the Courant published rebuttals by two readers who had witnessed the same concert, one saying, "This was one of the best concerts I have ever attended, and judging from the clapping, dancing, singing and cheering of the audience, I assume that many others would agree with me."

== Critical reception ==
Professional ratings
Review scores
Source	Rating
AllMusic	4.5/5 stars
The Encyclopedia of Popular Music	4/5 stars
The Great Rock Discography	8/10
Los Angeles Times	2/4 stars
MusicHound Rock	4/5
The Rolling Stone Album Guide	3.5/5 stars
The Village Voice	C

Back in the High Life met with generally positive reviews. Writing in July 1986 for Rolling Stone, Timothy White hailed it as "the first undeniably superb record of an almost decade-long solo career" for Winwood. Stereo Review magazine's Mark Peel said the album "weds Winwood's sure sense of melody to gospel, r-&-b, African polyrhythm, and Philly soul grooves", adding, "it's Lite Soul, but Russ Titelman's production and the outstanding recording job bring out every instrument with a bite and clarity that are often spectacular." In the Los Angeles Times, Kristine McKenna wrote that Back in the High Life mostly "sounds as beautiful as the exemplary message of hope it espouses", with themes of "faith, confusion, [and] a yearning for spiritual clarity" making it more than just "a decidedly tasteful record".

The album was not without criticism. McKenna suggested that the songs are flawed by somewhat indulgent lengths, singling out the Walsh duet "Split Decision" for "meander[ing] about rather aimlessly". The Village Voice reviewer Robert Christgau was more critical. He found Winwood's lyrics to be truthful and unpretentious but ultimately "well-wrought banalities" and uninteresting, which he attributed to Winwood being "a wunderkind with more talent than brains", who "after two decades of special treatment … derives all the self-esteem he needs just from surviving, as they say." Geoffrey Himes, writing for The Washington Post, was dismissive, saying that Winwood's creativity had abandoned him in 1971, and that this new album was proof that "the spark is gone." He complimented "Higher Love" for its catchy melody and electronic production, but he criticised the album as a whole, saying, "The songs really have no content, though Winwood's gorgeous blue-eyed soul voice almost convinces you otherwise."

Retrospective appraisals have been positive. While reviewing Winwood's 1988 follow-up album Roll with It, Dennis Hunt of the Los Angeles Times called Back in the High Life "arguably the best R&B album by a white singer in the last five years". Years later, in The Rough Guide to Rock (2003), Justin Lewis declared it "the epitome of sophisticated mid-80s AOR, as Winwood adds Caribbean and gospel flavours to his pop, rock and R&B mix."

== Legacy ==
In the UK, Back in the High Life was certified Gold by BPI in August 1986. In the US, strong sales in 1986 ensured the album was certified Platinum by October. With steady sales through 1987, the album was certified 3× Platinum by the RIAA in January 1988.

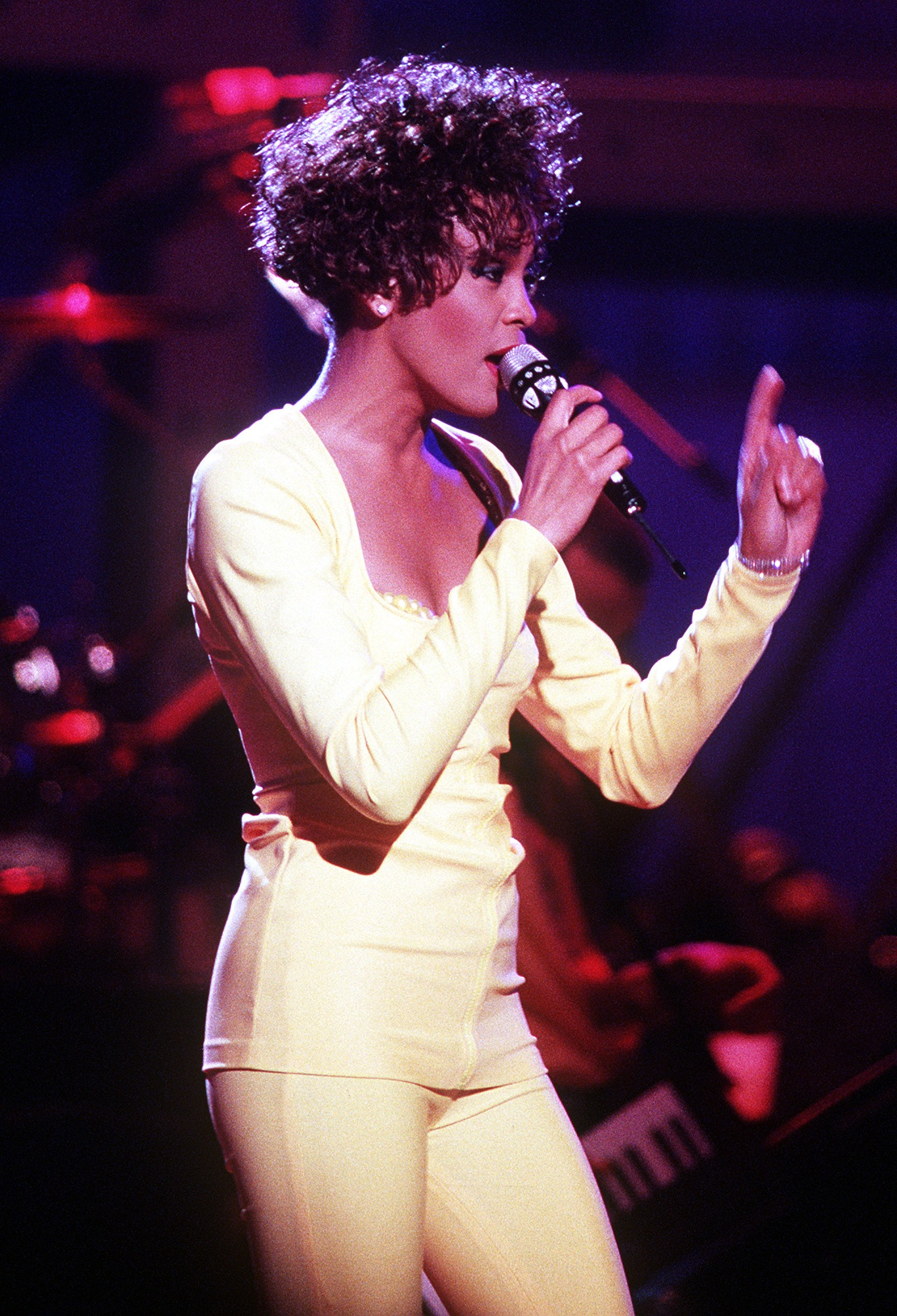
Whitney Houston's version of "Higher Love" was remixed posthumously in 2019

Winwood's wife Nicole separated from him in late 1985 while he was still recording on the other side of the Atlantic Ocean. Around the same time, Winwood went to hear a Junior Walker concert at the Lone Star Cafe in New York City and met a Nashville woman named Eugenia Crafton; the two struck up a relationship. Crafton was Winwood's girlfriend in mid-December 1985 when Will Jennings visited New York City with his own paramour, singer-songwriter Marshall Chapman. They went out as a foursome to enjoy the nightlife, and stayed at the Gramercy Park Hotel for a few days. Winwood kept his new girlfriend and failing marriage private: When he started his album tour in August 1986, he instructed his staff to inform journalists that he would not answer any questions about his personal life. Winwood's divorce was finalised in December 1986, then Crafton and Winwood married in January in a private ceremony held at Fifth Avenue Presbyterian Church. When he stepped up to the podium on 24 February 1987 to accept one of two Grammy Awards, Winwood said, "I'd like to say how much an award like that means to me. The more I'm involved in making records the more it seems to mean. So I would like to thank everyone who has written for me... And finally, I would like to thank my wife." Winwood settled in Nashville, and his first child, Mary Clare, was born in May 1987. The new Nashville vibe lent its sound to Winwood's fifth album, Roll With It, released in June 1988, which would eventually surpass Back in the High Life in sales.

The song "Higher Love" was covered by Irish singer-songwriter James Vincent McMorrow, who recorded a stripped-down ethereal acoustic version of it in 2011 for a compilation album called Silver Lining, produced to benefit the Irish charity Headstrong. The album raised €225,000. McMorrow's cover version was also used in Europe for an Amazon company advert. It was picked up again in 2017 for an American television commercial promoting the Hyundai Kona automobile. McMurrow said, "It's a beautiful melody, the chord structure of that song is really complex. When I used to play it on the guitar just to myself, I was always struck by how interesting it was." "Higher Love" was also covered by Whitney Houston in 1990, but her version was not widely heard as it was released only as a bonus track in Japan. In June 2019, seven years after Houston's death, Norwegian producer Kygo re-arranged and remixed her vocals to create a tropical house version. An accompanying video was released in August. The Houston/Kygo remix of "Higher Love" was certified Gold in the US in October 2019, and the next month it reached Platinum in the UK.

== Track listing ==
All tracks written by Steve Winwood and Will Jennings except where noted.

No.	Title	Writer(s)	Length
1.	"Higher Love"		5:51
2.	"Take It As It Comes"		5:24
3.	"Freedom Overspill"	Winwood, George Fleming, James Hooker	5:37
4.	"Back in the High Life Again"		5:35
5.	"The Finer Things"		5:49
6.	"Wake Me Up on Judgment Day"		5:52
7.	"Split Decision"	Winwood, Joe Walsh	6:00
8.	"My Love's Leavin'"	Winwood, Vivian Stanshall	5:21

== Personnel ==
Adapted from the album liner notes and AllMusic credits

=== Musicians ===
- Steve Winwood – lead vocals on all tracks; backing vocals on "Higher Love", "Take It As It Comes", "Freedom Overspill" and "My Love's Leavin'"; synthesiser on "Higher Love", "Back in the High Life Again", "Wake Me Up on Judgment Day" and "Split Decision"; drum machine programming on all tracks except "Take It As It Comes" and "Split Decision"; sequencer programming on "Higher Love", "Take It As It Comes", "Freedom Overspill", "The Finer Things" and "Wake Me Up on Judgment Day"; keyboards on "Take It As It Comes", "The Finer Things" and "My Love's Leavin'"; guitar on "Take It As It Comes" and "My Love's Leavin'"; Hammond organ on "Freedom Overspill" and "Split Decision"; synth bass on "Freedom Overspill", synth piano on "Back in the High Life Again", mandolin on "Back in the High Life Again", Moog bass on "Back in the High Life Again", "Split Decision" and "My Love's Leavin'"; synth solo on "The Finer Things" and "My Love's Leavin'"
- Andrew Thomas – PPG Waveterm synthesiser programming on "Higher Love", "The Finer Things" and "Wake Me Up on Judgment Day"
- Robbie Kilgore – synthesiser and sequencer programming; additional keyboards on "The Finer Things"; additional synthesiser on "Wake Me Up on Judgment Day" and "Split Decision"; synth bell on "My Love's Leavin'"
- Rob Mounsey – additional synthesiser on "Back in the High Life Again", additional keyboards on "The Finer Things", synth strings on "My Love's Leavin'"
- Philippe Saisse – synth bass on "Higher Love"
- Nile Rodgers – rhythm guitar on "Higher Love" and "Wake Me Up on Judgment Day"
- Eddie Martinez – lead guitar on "Higher Love", rhythm guitar on "Freedom Overspill"
- Joe Walsh – slide guitar on "Freedom Overspill", guitar on "Split Decision"
- Paul Pesco – guitar on "The Finer Things"
- Ira Siegel – lead guitar on "Wake Me Up on Judgment Day"
- John "JR" Robinson – drums on "Higher Love", "Back in the High Life Again", "The Finer Things", "Wake Me Up on Judgment Day" and "Split Decision"; drum solo on "Higher Love"
- Mickey Curry – drums on "Take It As It Comes"
- Steve Ferrone – drums on "Freedom Overspill"
- Carole Steele – tambourine and congas on "Higher Love"; tambourine on "Take It As It Comes" and "Split Decision"; congas on "The Finer Things"; percussion on "Freedom Overspill", "Wake Me Up on Judgment Day" and "My Love's Leavin'"
- Jimmy Bralower – additional drum machine programming on "Higher Love", "Freedom Overspill", "Back in the High Life Again", "The Finer Things" and "Wake Me Up on Judgment Day"
- David Frank – synth horns on "Higher Love" and "Wake Me Up on Judgment Day"
- Arif Mardin – synth string arrangements on "My Love's Leavin'"
- Chaka Khan – backing vocals on "Higher Love"
- James Taylor – backing vocals on "Back in the High Life Again"
- James Ingram and Dan Hartman – backing vocals on "The Finer Things"
- Jocelyn Brown, Connie Harvey and Mark Stevens – backing vocals on "Wake Me Up on Judgment Day" and "Split Decision"

==== Brass section on "Take It As It Comes" and "Freedom Overspill" ====
- Randy Brecker – trumpet
- Tom Malone – trombone
- George Young – alto saxophone
- Bob Mintzer and Lewis Del Gatto – tenor saxophone
- Lewis Del Gatto – baritone saxophone
- David Frank – horn arrangements

=== Production ===
- Steve Winwood – producer
- Russ Titelman – producer
- Laura Loncteaux – production coordinator
- Jill Dell'Abate – assistant production coordinator
- Ted Jensen – mastering at Sterling Sound, New York City.
- Jeffrey Kent Ayeroff – art direction
- Jeri McManus – art direction, cover design
- Arthur Elgort – photography

==== Netherturkdonic ====
- Nobby Clarke – additional engineering
- Sean Chenery – assistant engineer

==== Power Station ====
- Jason Corsaro – engineer
- John Goldberger – assistant engineer
- Rob Eaton – assistant engineer
- Roy Hendrickson – assistant engineer
- Steve Rinkoff – assistant engineer
- Shizuko Orishige – assistant engineer
- Bruce Lampcov – additional engineering
- Dave Greenberg – additional engineering
- Jim Boyer – additional engineering
- Malcolm Pollack – additional engineering

==== Right Track ====
- Scott Mabuchi – assistant engineer

==== Giant Sound ====
- Claude "Swifty" Achille – assistant engineer
- Jon Wolfson – additional engineering

==== Unique Recording ====
- Tom Lord-Alge – mixing, engineer
- Ed Bruder – assistant engineer
- Jeff Lord-Alge – assistant engineer
- Chris Lord-Alge – additional engineering

== Industry awards ==
=== Grammy Awards ===
Year	Nominee / work	Award	Result
1987	Back in the High Life (performed and produced by Steve Winwood, co-produced by Russ Titelman)	Album of the Year	Nominated
1987	Back in the High Life (engineered by Jason Corsaro and Tom Lord-Alge)	Best Engineered Non-Classical Album	Won
1987	"Higher Love" (composed by Steve Winwood and Will Jennings)	Song of the Year	Nominated
1987	"Higher Love" (performed and produced by Steve Winwood, co-produced by Russ Titelman)	Record of the Year	Won
1987	"Higher Love" (performed by Steve Winwood)	Best Pop Vocal Performance – Male	Won
1987	Steve Winwood, Russ Titelman	Non-Classical Producer of the Year	Nominated
1988	"Back in the High Life Again" (performed and produced by Steve Winwood, co-produced by Russ Titelman)	Record of the Year	Nominated

=== MTV Video Music Awards ===
Year	Nominee / work	Award	Result
1987	"Higher Love"	Video of the Year	Nominated
1987	"Higher Love"	Best Male Video	Nominated
1987	"Higher Love"	Viewer's Choice	Nominated
1987	"Higher Love" (Directors: Peter Kagan and Paula Greif)	Best Direction in a Video	Nominated
1987	"Higher Love" (Editors: Peter Kagan, Laura Israel and Glen Lazzarro)	Best Editing in a Video	Nominated
1987	"Higher Love" (Choreographer: Ed Love)	Best Choreography in a Video	Nominated
1987	"Higher Love" (Director of Photography: Peter Kagan)	Best Cinematography in a Video	Nominated
1988	"Back in the High Life Again"	Best Male Video	Nominated

== Charts ==
=== Weekly charts ===
Chart (1986–1987)	Peak position
Australian Albums (Kent Music Report)	11
Canada Top Albums/CDs (RPM)	6
Dutch Albums (Album Top 100)	15
German Albums (Offizielle Top 100)	18
Italian Albums (Musica e Dischi)	14
Japanese Albums (Oricon)	46
New Zealand Albums (RMNZ)	19
Norwegian Albums (VG-lista)	14
Swedish Albums (Sverigetopplistan)	11
Swiss Albums (Schweizer Hitparade)	12
UK Albums (Official Charts)	8
US Billboard 200	3
US Top R&B/Hip-Hop Albums (Billboard)	46

=== Year-end charts ===
Chart (1986)	Position
Australian Albums (Kent Music Report)	47
Canada Top Albums/CDs (RPM)	25
Dutch Albums (Album Top 100)	88
UK Albums (OCC)	68
US Billboard 200	69

Chart (1987)	Position
Canada Top Albums/CDs (RPM)	51
US Billboard 200	14

== Certifications ==
Region	Certification	Certified units/sales
New Zealand (RMNZ)	Gold	7,500^{^}
United Kingdom (BPI)	Gold	100,000^{^}
United States (RIAA)	3× Platinum	3,000,000^{^}
^{^} Shipments figures based on certification alone.
