= Higher Love =

1986 single by Steve Winwood

Single by Steve Winwood

from the album Back in the High Life
- B-side: "And I Go"
- Released: June 20, 1986
- Studio: Unique Recording (New York City)
- Genre: Soft rock; blues rock; blue-eyed soul
- Length: 5:51 (album version); 4:14 (single version)
- Label: Island – IS 288
- Songwriters: Steve Winwood; Will Jennings
- Producers: Russ Titelman; Steve Winwood

Steve Winwood singles chronology
"Valerie" (1982)	"Higher Love" (1986)	"Freedom Overspill" (1986)

Music video
- "Higher Love" on YouTube

"Higher Love" is a 1986 song by the English singer Steve Winwood. It was the first single released from his fourth solo studio album, Back in the High Life (1986). It was written by Winwood and Will Jennings and produced by Russ Titelman and Winwood. The backing vocals were performed by Chaka Khan, who also appeared in its music video.

"Higher Love" was Winwood's first Billboard Hot 100 number-one song, topping the chart for one week beginning 30 August 1986. "Higher Love" also spent four weeks atop the US Billboard Album Rock Tracks chart and earned two Grammy Awards, for Record of the Year and Best Male Pop Vocal Performance. It also peaked at number 13 in the United Kingdom, Winwood's highest charting solo entry there, and reached number one in Canada for a week.

Whitney Houston covered the song in 1990 and it was included as a bonus track on the Japanese edition of her third studio album I'm Your Baby Tonight. In 2016, Winwood made a version with his daughter Lilly Winwood, performing a duet for a Hershey commercial. Norwegian DJ Kygo reworked Houston's cover into a tropical house track in 2019, which was released as a single worldwide and hit number one on Billboard magazine's Dance Club Songs chart, making it Houston's highest-charting posthumous release to date.

== Background ==
Winwood recorded the album Back in the High Life at several studios in New York City, ending up at Unique Recording Studios where Tom Lord-Alge was engineering with his brothers. To round out the sounds on "Higher Love", producer Russ Titelman brought in two members of the funk/soul band Rufus: singer Chaka Khan and drummer John 'JR' Robinson. After recording his drum parts and while waiting for Khan to get set up, JR played an impromptu drum fill which Lord-Alge caught on tape. Lord-Alge connected this drum fill to the beginning of "Higher Love", by assigning a timing offset to one of two tape machines such that they first played the drum fill followed by the song coming in on the beat. Titelman was happy with the result and decided to open the album with this drum fill. JR used a Latin rimshot technique across the top of his classic seamless brass Ludwig Black Beauty snare, unmuffled, with its snare wires disengaged, to emulate the sound of a timbale. He said, "it's one of the best drum intros I've ever played."

Titelman remembered the fill being played ad lib by JR while Khan was preparing to sing her background vocals on "Higher Love", causing Khan to exclaim "What is that shit? It sounds like voodoo shit!" Lord-Alge agreed that the drum fill was played as a lark after JR completed his drum overdubs for "Higher Love". Tom said, "It was one of those happy accidents, and it happened because [sound engineer brother] Chris always taught me that if the tape is rolling and there's a musician in the studio, make sure the tape machine is in record!"

== Music video ==
The music video for the song uses the shorter single version and was shot in June 1986 by directors Peter Kagan and Paula Greif. Kagan and Greif shot an almost identical video for Duran Duran's "Notorious" in November of that year; coincidentally, both videos were nominated for several awards at the 1987 MTV Video Music Awards though neither won. Chaka Khan appears in the video, as does Nile Rodgers, who plays guitar with Winwood's band.

== Track listings ==
- 7-inch: Island / IS 288 United Kingdom
1. "Higher Love" – 4:14
2. "And I Go" – 4:12
- 7-inch: Island / 7-28710 United States
1. "Higher Love" – 4:14
2. "And I Go" – 4:12
- 12-inch: Island / 12 IS 288 United Kingdom
1. "Higher Love" (remix) – 7:45
2. "Higher Love" (instrumental) – 6:05
3. "And I Go" – 4:12

* Tracks one and two remixed by Tom Lord-Alge

- 12-inch: Island / PRO-A-2507 United States
1. "Higher Love" (edit) – 4:08
2. "Higher Love" (LP version) – 5:45

== Personnel ==
- Steve Winwood – lead and backing vocals, synthesizer, sequencer programming, and Oberheim DMX programming
- Chaka Khan – backing vocals
- Nile Rodgers – rhythm guitar
- Robbie Kilgore – synthesizer and sequencer programming
- Andrew Thomas – PPG Waveterm synthesizer programming
- David Frank – synthesizer horns and synth horn arrangement
- Philippe Saisse – synthesizer bass
- Eddie Martinez – lead guitar
- John Robinson – drums
- Jimmy Bralower – Oberheim DMX programming
- Carole Steele – congas, tambourine

== Charts ==
=== Weekly charts ===
Chart (1986–1987)	Peak position
Australia (Kent Music Report)	8
Belgium (Ultratop 50 Flanders)	31
Canada Top Singles (RPM)	1
Canada Adult Contemporary (RPM)	7
Europe (European Hot 100 Singles)	19
Finland (Suomen virallinen lista)	13
Ireland (IRMA)	11
Netherlands (Dutch Top 40)	24
Netherlands (Single Top 100)	26
New Zealand (Recorded Music NZ)	11
South Africa (Springbok Radio)	17
UK Singles (Official Charts)	13
US Billboard Hot 100	1
US Adult Contemporary (Billboard)	7
US Mainstream Rock Airplay (Billboard)	1
West Germany (GfK)	49

=== Year-end charts ===
Chart (1986)	Position
Australia (Kent Music Report)	68
Canada Top Singles (RPM)	35
US Billboard Hot 100	20

== Certifications ==
Region	Certification	Certified units/sales
New Zealand (RMNZ)	2× Platinum	60,000^{‡}
United Kingdom (BPI) Sales since 2005	Platinum	600,000^{‡}
^{‡} Sales+streaming figures based on certification alone.

== James Vincent McMorrow version ==
James Vincent McMorrow recorded a cover of the song for his charity album 'Silver Lining' which was recorded and produced by the students of Sound Training Centre in Dublin for the charity Headstrong. The cover was used as the soundtrack for television advertisements in the UK by LoveFilm in 2011.

=== Charts ===
Chart (2011)	Peak position
Ireland (IRMA)	4
Scottish Singles Sales (Official Charts)	22
UK Independent (Official Charts)	1
UK Singles (Official Charts)	21

== Kygo and Whitney Houston version ==
"Higher Love"

Single by Kygo and Whitney Houston

from the album Golden Hour and I Will Always Love You: The Best of Whitney Houston (reissue)
- Released: 28 June 2019
- Recorded: December 1989 (Houston's vocals); December 2018 (Kygo's arrangement)
- Studio: Right Track Recording (New York, NY) (Houston's vocals); Tarpan Studios (San Rafael, CA) (Kygo's arrangement)
- Genre: Tropical house
- Length: 3:48
- Label: RCA
- Songwriters: Steve Winwood; Will Jennings
- Producers: Kygo; Narada Michael Walden

Kygo singles chronology
"Kem kan eg ringe" (2019)	"Higher Love" (2019)	"Family" (2019)

Whitney Houston singles chronology
"Memories" (2016)	"Higher Love" (2019)	"How Will I Know (Whitney × Clean Bandit)" (2021)

Music video
- "Higher Love" on YouTube

A cover of "Higher Love" was released as a single by Norwegian DJ and record producer Kygo and late American singer Whitney Houston on 28 June 2019. The song was released to streaming and digital download formats on 28 June 2019 by the label RCA Records. The song is the lead single from Kygo's third studio album, Golden Hour. The song was also featured in a Ford Summer Sales Event commercial in 2020.

Houston's cover of the Winwood track was originally included on the Japanese edition of her third studio album, I'm Your Baby Tonight (1990). This version of the track was produced by American musician Narada Michael Walden, and therefore Walden is credited as a producer of "Higher Love" alongside Kygo. Houston performed her rendition of "Higher Love" at the 14 dates of her 1990 Feels So Right Tour in Japan.

In the UK, "Higher Love" was a commercial success, surpassing the Winwood version in terms of chart performance. It peaked at number two in the UK Singles Chart, making it Kygo's third top ten song there and first to reach the nation's top five, and Houston's eighteenth to peak within the top ten. It is also Houston's first posthumous top 10 track. She had last reached the top ten with "Million Dollar Bill" charting at number five in October 2009. Therefore, "Higher Love" became her highest-charting single in the UK since 1999 when "My Love Is Your Love" peaked at number two. In Scotland, the song peaked at number one.

Since its release, "Higher Love" has reached the top five in Croatia, Flanders, Ireland, Israel, Latvia, Norway, Slovakia, and Slovenia, plus the top ten in the Netherlands, Hungary, Sweden, and Switzerland. It also hit the top twenty charts in Australia, Austria, China, Czech Republic, and Wallonia. In the U.S., "Higher Love" debuted at number 63 on the Billboard Hot 100 chart, with 6.6 million US streams in its first week; it was also its peak position. The song topped Billboard's Dance Club Songs chart in the US, becoming Kygo's third number one on the chart and Houston's fourteenth.

In September 2020, the song was nominated at the Billboard Music Awards for Top Dance/Electronic Song. The Recording Industry Association of America (RIAA) would certify the single triple platinum in the US.

Notably, "Higher Love" was played immediately following Joe Biden's victory speech after his election as the 46th President of the United States on 7 November 2020. Writing for Billboard, Katie Bain described the song's use in a political setting: "Indeed, after Biden shared his vision of 'a nation united, a nation strengthened. A nation healed', 'Higher Love' backed up the message, particularly for those who know all the words... Few sentiments could so effectively summarize the weary travails of the American collective consciousness during the past four years."

The song also appears on the US and European vinyl edition of Houston's hits compilation album, I Will Always Love You: The Best of Whitney Houston released in October 2021 on RCA Records.

Starting in the 2026 Season, the North Carolina Courage of the National Women's Soccer League picked the Kygo/Whitney Houston version of "Higher Love" as their official club anthem after a vote among fans, players, and staff. The song is played before home kickoffs at WakeMed Soccer Park.

=== Music video ===
The official video, directed by Hannah Lux Davis, was made available on YouTube on 26 August 2019. It begins with a group of men in modern clothing walking through seemingly abandoned warehouses. They are impressed to see a 1980s aerobics class led by an instructor played by Canadian actress Vanessa Morgan. After initially being shooed away, the male lead walks into the room and suddenly wears a 1980s aerobics outfit. He starts dancing with the female lead and is eventually joined by his male companions.

The video has brief snippets of Whitney Houston's "I Wanna Dance with Somebody" music video showing on a TV along with posters of her from the 1987 Whitney album on the wall. In the end, the instructor is accidentally kicked in the face by one of the dancers and wakes up in a present-day outdoor café, revealing that the 1980s aerobics class was just a dream and that the male lead is actually her waiter.

=== Personnel ===
- Whitney Houston – lead vocals, backing vocals/arrangement, vocal production
- Narada Michael Walden – backing vocals arrangement, producer, arranger
- Kygo – producer, remixer, arranger
- Claytoven Richardson, Jeanie Tracy, Anne Stocking, Larry Batiste, Skyler Jett, Kitty Beethoven, Cynthia Shiloh, Greg "Gigi" Gonaway, Raz Kennedy, Cornell "CC" Carter, Lydette Stephens, Renee Cattaneo, Tina Thompson, Sylvester Jackson – backing vocals

=== Charts ===
==== Weekly charts ====
Chart (2019–2025)	Peak position
Australia (ARIA)	20
Austria (Ö3 Austria Top 40)	20
Belgium (Ultratop 50 Flanders)	4
Belgium (Ultratop 50 Wallonia)	12
Canada Hot 100 (Billboard)	22
Canada AC (Billboard)	3
Canada CHR/Top 40 (Billboard)	47
Canada Hot AC (Billboard)	13
China Airplay/FL (Billboard)	16
Croatia International Airplay (Top lista)	2
Czech Republic Airplay (ČNS IFPI)	2
Czech Republic Singles Digital (ČNS IFPI)	18
Denmark (Tracklisten)	28
Estonia (Eesti Tipp-40)	23
Estonia Airplay (TopHit)	67
Euro Digital Song Sales (Billboard)	2
France (SNEP)	72
Germany (GfK)	22
Germany Airplay (BVMI)	1
Greece International (IFPI)	29
Hungary (Rádiós Top 40)	6
Hungary (Single Top 40)	9
Hungary (Stream Top 40)	19
Ireland (IRMA)	4
Israel Airplay (Media Forest)	3
Latvia (LaIPA)	25
Lithuania (AGATA)	16
Lithuania Airplay (TopHit)	126
Netherlands (Dutch Top 40)	7
Netherlands (Single Top 100)	27
Mexico Airplay (Billboard)	18
New Zealand (Recorded Music NZ)	26
Norway (VG-lista)	2
Poland Airplay (ZPAV)	51
Portugal (AFP)	93
Romania (Airplay 100)	25
San Marino (SMRRTV Top 50)	26
Scottish Singles Sales (Official Charts)	1
Slovakia Airplay (ČNS IFPI)	3
Slovakia Singles Digital (ČNS IFPI)	13
Slovenia (SloTop50)	2
Sweden (Sverigetopplistan)	9
Switzerland (Schweizer Hitparade)	10
Ukraine Airplay (TopHit)	174
UK Singles (Official Charts)	2
US Billboard Hot 100	63
US Hot Dance/Electronic Songs (Billboard)	2
US Adult Contemporary (Billboard)	7
US Adult Pop Airplay (Billboard)	12
US Dance Club Songs (Billboard)	1
US Dance Airplay (Billboard)	2
US Pop Airplay (Billboard)	29
US Rolling Stone Top 100	27

==== Year-end charts ====
Chart (2019)	Position
Australia (ARIA)	82
Austria (Ö3 Austria Top 40)	45
Belgium (Ultratop Flanders)	27
Belgium (Ultratop Wallonia)	83
Canada (Canadian Hot 100)	63
Germany (Official German Charts)	58
Hungary (Rádiós Top 40)	73
Hungary (Single Top 40)	63
Iceland (Tónlistinn)	58
Ireland (IRMA)	39
Latvia (LaIPA)	71
Netherlands (Dutch Top 40)	23
Netherlands (Single Top 100)	58
Slovenia (SloTop50)	26
Sweden (Sverigetopplistan)	62
Tokyo (Tokio Hot 100)	38
Switzerland (Schweizer Hitparade)	30
UK Singles (OCC)	26
US Adult Contemporary (Billboard)	34
US Dance Club Songs (Billboard)	28
US Hot Dance/Electronic Songs (Billboard)	9

Chart (2020)	Position
Belgium (Ultratop Flanders)	81
Sweden (Sverigetopplistan)	91
UK Singles (OCC)	67
US Adult Contemporary (Billboard)	13
US Hot Dance/Electronic Songs (Billboard)	9

2024 year-end chart performance for "Higher Love"
Chart (2024)	Position
Estonia Airplay (TopHit)	170

=== Certifications ===
Region	Certification	Certified units/sales
Australia (ARIA)	3× Platinum	210,000^{‡}
Austria (IFPI Austria)	Platinum	30,000^{‡}
Belgium (BRMA)	Platinum	40,000^{‡}
Canada (Music Canada)	2× Platinum	160,000^{‡}
Denmark (IFPI Danmark)	2× Platinum	180,000^{‡}
France (SNEP)	Platinum	200,000^{‡}
Germany (BVMI)	Platinum	400,000^{‡}
Italy (FIMI)	Platinum	100,000^{‡}
Mexico (AMPROFON)	2× Platinum	120,000^{‡}
New Zealand (RMNZ)	4× Platinum	120,000^{‡}
Poland (ZPAV)	2× Platinum	40,000^{‡}
Spain (Promusicae)	Platinum	60,000^{‡}
Switzerland (IFPI Switzerland)	Platinum	20,000^{‡}
United Kingdom (BPI)	3× Platinum	1,800,000^{‡}
United States (RIAA)	3× Platinum	3,000,000^{‡}
^{‡} Sales+streaming figures based on certification alone.

== See also ==
- List of Billboard number-one dance songs of 2019
