= Refugees of the Heart =

Studio album by Steve Winwood
- Released: 5 November 1990
- Recorded: Winter 1989–Summer 1990
- Studios: Netherturkdonic Studios (Gloucestershire, England, UK); Emerald Sound (Nashville, Tennessee, USA)
- Genres: Rock, blue-eyed soul, pop
- Length: 46:59
- Label: Virgin
- Producer: Steve Winwood

Steve Winwood chronology
| Roll with It (1988) | Refugees of the Heart (1990) | Junction Seven (1997) |

Singles from Refugees of the Heart
- 1. "One and Only Man" Released: October 1990; 2. "I Will Be Here" Released: April 1991

Professional ratings
Review scores
| Source | Rating |
|---|---|
| AllMusic | 2.5/5 stars |
| Chicago Tribune | 2/4 stars |
| Robert Christgau | (dud) |
| Entertainment Weekly | C− |
| Los Angeles Times | 2.5/5 stars |
| People | (Neutral) |
| NME | 0.5/5 stars |
| Rolling Stone | 4/5 stars |

Refugees of the Heart is the sixth solo studio album by Steve Winwood, released in 1990. The album contained the hit single, "One and Only Man", which topped the Mainstream Rock Tracks chart, was No. 18 at Billboard's Hot 100 and saw the return of former Traffic bandmate Jim Capaldi to Winwood's songwriting team. A Traffic reunion followed in 1994, and because of that collaboration, Winwood would not release another solo album until 1997. "I Will Be Here" and "Another Deal Goes Down" were also released as singles.

Winwood stated about the closing track, “In the Light of Day”: 'When Will and I wrote the song (..) it was our idea of what Nelson Mandela's dream was, while he was in prison. It was really just a fantasy of ours, but that's what we based the song on.'

== Reception ==
NME said, "Winwood seems to have recorded this in his sleep. Stevie pulls every stale cliche out of his repertoire and gets a couple of witless friends to write equally tired lyrics for them. Retire now." Entertainment Weekly said, "this tasteful and exquisitely boring record is merely another exercise in rock professionalism; it's like being trapped in an hour-long TV commercial for an after-work singles bar."

== Track listing ==
All songs written by Steve Winwood and Will Jennings except where noted.

1. "You'll Keep on Searching" – 6:15
2. "Every Day (Oh Lord)" – 5:44
3. "One and Only Man" – (Steve Winwood, Jim Capaldi) 4:55
4. "I Will Be Here" – 5:50
5. "Another Deal Goes Down" – 4:55
6. "Running On" – 4:15
7. "Come Out and Dance" – 5:30
8. "In the Light of Day" – 9:35

== Non-album tracks ==
- Always (instrumental)
- In the Light of Day (instrumental version)

"Always" was the b-side to "One and Only Man", while the instrumental version of "In the Light of Day" was the b-side to "I Will Be Here". The instrumental version, an edit of the album version's backing track, runs for about 6 minutes and contains some improvisational work at the end not found on the album version.

== Personnel ==
- Steve Winwood – vocals, keyboards (1–6, 8), Hammond organ (1, 3–7), Minimoog solo (2), keyboard bass (3), guitar (3, 7), additional percussion (3), vibraphone solo (8), additional drums (8), keyboard programming, Fairlight programming, drum programming
- Mike Lawler – additional keyboards (1, 4)
- Anthony Crawford – guitar (1)
- Larry Byrom – guitar (2, 4, 6, 7), slide guitar (5)
- Michael Rhodes – bass guitar (1, 2, 4–7)
- Russ Kunkel – drums (1, 4, 5)
- Jim Capaldi – drums (2, 3, 7), percussion (3)
- Eddie Bayers – drums (6)
- Bashiri Johnson – percussion (1, 2, 4–8)
- Randall Bramblett – soprano saxophone (1), alto saxophone (7), tenor saxophone (8)
- Jim Horn – alto saxophone (4), baritone and tenor saxophones (7)
- Harvey Thomson – tenor saxophone (7)
- Michael Haynes – trumpet (7)

Production

- Produced by Steve Winwood
- Executive Producer and Management – John Clarke
- Engineered and Mixed by Tom Lord-Alge
- Assistant Engineer – Brian Harding (Nashville)
- Additional Engineering – Mick Dolan
- Mastered by Ted Jensen at Sterling Sound (New York, NY).
- Art Direction – Jeffrey Kent Ayeroff and Melanie Nissen
- Design – Mike Fink
- Photography – Andrew and Stuart Douglas

== Charts ==
=== Weekly charts ===
| Chart (1990–91) | Peak position |
|---|---|
| Australian Albums (ARIA) | 45 |
| Canada Top Albums/CDs (RPM) | 23 |
| Dutch Albums (Album Top 100) | 58 |
| German Albums (Offizielle Top 100) | 25 |
| Japanese Albums (Oricon) | 88 |
| Swedish Albums (Sverigetopplistan) | 19 |
| Swiss Albums (Schweizer Hitparade) | 27 |
| UK Albums (Official Charts) | 27 |
| US Billboard 200 | 26 |

=== Year-end charts ===
| Chart (1990) | Peak position |
|---|---|
| Canada Top Albums/CDs (RPM) | 97 |

== Certifications ==
| Region | Certification | Certified units/sales |
|---|---|---|
| Canada (Music Canada) | Gold | 50,000^{^} |
| United States (RIAA) | Gold | 500,000^{^} |
^{^} Shipments figures based on certification alone.
