= Roll with It (album) =

Studio album by Steve Winwood
- Released: 20 June 1988
- Recorded: Autumn 1987–Spring 1988
- Studios: Windmill Lane Studios (Dublin, Ireland); McClear Place Studio (Toronto, Canada)
- Genres: Rhythm and blues, Rock, blues, pop, blue-eyed soul, adult contemporary
- Length: 44:27
- Label: Virgin
- Producers: Steve Winwood; Tom Lord-Alge

Steve Winwood chronology
Chronicles (1987)	Roll with It (1988)	Refugees of the Heart (1990)

Singles from Roll with It
- 1. "Roll with It" Released: May 1988; 2. "Don't You Know What the Night Can Do?" Released: August 1988; 3. "Holding On" Released: November 1988; 4. "Hearts on Fire" Released: November 1989

Professional ratings
Review scores
Source	Rating
AllMusic	3/5 stars
Christgau's Record Guide: The '80s	B−
Deseret News	2.5/4 stars
Los Angeles Times	3/4 stars
The New York Times	(Positive)
People	(Mixed)
Rolling Stone	3/5 stars

Roll with It is the fifth solo studio album by the English blue-eyed soul artist Steve Winwood, released on 20 June 1988. It became one of Winwood's most commercially successful albums, reaching number four on the UK Albums Chart and number one on the US Billboard 200, and has sold over three million copies.

The title track topped the pop and rock singles charts; its success led to the subsequent singles "Don't You Know What the Night Can Do?" and "Holding On". "Don't You Know What the Night Can Do?" had been written by Winwood to be featured in an ad campaign for Michelob, which began running on American television on the day of the Roll with It album's US release. Two other tracks from Roll with It, "Hearts on Fire" and "Put on Your Dancing Shoes", also achieved radio airplay.

== Track listing ==
All songs written by Steve Winwood and Will Jennings except where noted.

1. "Roll with It" (Winwood, Jennings, Holland-Dozier-Holland) – 5:17
2. "Holding On" – 6:14
3. "The Morning Side" – 5:12
4. "Put on Your Dancing Shoes" – 5:10
5. "Don't You Know What the Night Can Do?" – 6:53
6. "Hearts on Fire" (Winwood, Jim Capaldi) – 5:14
7. "One More Morning" – 4:58
8. "Shining Song" – 5:29

== Personnel ==
- Steve Winwood – lead vocals, backing vocals (1, 2, 4–6, 8), acoustic piano (1, 7), Hammond organ (1, 2, 6, 7), Fairlight programming (1, 2, 4–6, 8), bass guitar (1, 7), drums (1), keyboards (2–5, 8), guitar (2, 4, 7), Moog bass (3), Minimoog solo (8)
- Mike Lawler – keyboards (1–8)
- Robbie Kilgore – keyboards (2, 4, 8)
- Paul Pesco – guitar (3, 6)
- John Robinson – drums (2–7)
- Bashiri Johnson – percussion (2–5, 7)
- Jimmy Bralower – percussion (4, 8), drum machine (4, 8)
- Tom Lord-Alge – tambourine (8)
- The Memphis Horns – horn arrangements (1, 2, 6, 7)
  - Andrew Love – tenor saxophone, sax solo (1)
  - Wayne Jackson – trombone, trumpet
- Mark Williamson – backing vocals (1, 2, 4–6, 8)
- Tessa Niles – backing vocals (1, 2, 4–6, 8)

Production

- Steve Winwood – producer
- Tom Lord-Alge – producer, engineer, mixing
- John Clarke – executive producer
- Jeff Lord-Alge – assistant engineer
- Mary Kettle – assistant engineer
- Paul Shubat – assistant engineer
- Ted Jensen – mastering at Sterling Sound (New York, NY).
- Lee Charteris – production coordination
- Jeffrey Kent Ayeroff – art direction
- Mick Haggerty – art direction, design
- Herb Ritts – photography

== Accolades ==
=== Grammy Awards ===
Year	Nominee / work	Award	Result
1989	Roll with It	Album of the Year	Nominated
1989	"Roll with It"	Record of the Year	Nominated
1989	"Roll with It"	Best Male Pop Vocal Performance	Nominated
1989	Tom Lord-Alge (engineer)	Best Engineered Album, Non Classical	Won

=== BRIT Awards ===
Year	Nominee / work	Award	Result
1989	Roll with It	Best British Album	Nominated
1989	Steve Winwood	Best British Male	Nominated

== Charts ==
=== Weekly charts ===
Chart (1988)	Peak position
Australian Albums (ARIA)	16
Canada Top Albums/CDs (RPM)	3
Dutch Albums (Album Top 100)	21
German Albums (Offizielle Top 100)	7
Italian Albums (Musica e Dischi)	17
Japanese Albums (Oricon)	53
New Zealand Albums (RMNZ)	16
Norwegian Albums (VG-lista)	11
Swedish Albums (Sverigetopplistan)	3
Swiss Albums (Schweizer Hitparade)	4
UK Albums (Official Charts)	4
US Billboard 200	1
US Top R&B/Hip-Hop Albums (Billboard)	93

=== Year-end charts ===
Chart (1988)	Peak position
Canada Top Albums/CDs (RPM)	11
US Billboard 200	34

== Certifications ==
Region	Certification	Certified units/sales
Canada (Music Canada)	2× Platinum	200,000^{^}
Sweden (GLF)	Gold	50,000^{^}
United Kingdom (BPI)	Gold	100,000^{^}
United States (RIAA)	2× Platinum	2,000,000^{^}
^{^} Shipments figures based on certification alone.
