= Roll with It (Steve Winwood song) =

1988 single by Steve Winwood

- Artwork for UK releases

Single by Steve Winwood

from the album Roll with It
- B-side: "The Morning Side"
- Released: May 1988
- Genre: Funk; R&B; pop; blue-eyed soul
- Length: 4:30 (single/video edit); 5:20 (album version)
- Label: Virgin
- Songwriters: Steve Winwood; Will Jennings; Holland-Dozier-Holland
- Producers: Steve Winwood, Tom Lord-Alge

Steve Winwood singles chronology
"Talking Back to the Night (remix)" (1988)	"Roll with It" (1988)	"Put on Your Dancing Shoes" (1988)

"Roll with It" is a song recorded by Steve Winwood for his album Roll with It, released on Virgin Records. It was written by Winwood and long-time collaborator Will Jennings. Publishing rights organization BMI later had Motown songwriters Holland-Dozier-Holland credited with co-writing the song due to its resemblance to the Junior Walker hit "(I'm a) Roadrunner".

== Release and reception ==
The single spent four straight weeks at No. 1 on the Billboard Hot 100 singles chart starting on the issue dating July 30, 1988. It topped the Billboard adult contemporary chart for two weeks, and also spent four weeks at No. 1 on the Billboard mainstream rock chart. In addition, the song reached No. 30 on the R&B chart. In the United Kingdom, the song reached No. 53 on the UK Singles Chart.

"Roll with It" was nominated for two Grammy Awards in 1989, Record of the Year and Best Male Pop Vocal performance. The album Roll with It was also nominated as Album of the Year.

== Music video ==
The music video, directed by David Fincher and filmed in sepia-tone, depicts Winwood performing the song in a bar. As he and his band play, bar patrons erotically dance with each other.

== Track listings ==
7-inch: Virgin / VS 1085 United Kingdom

1. "Roll with It" – 4:30
2. "The Morning Side" – 3:57

7-inch: Virgin / 7-99326 United States

1. "Roll with It" – 4:30
2. "The Morning Side" – 5:12

12-inch and CD Single: Virgin / VST 1085, VSCD 1085 United Kingdom

1. "Roll with It" (12-inch remix) – 9:56
2. "The Morning Side" – 3:57
3. "Roll with It" (7-inch remix) – 4:30
- Track 1 remixed by Bruce Forest and Frank Heller

12-inch: Virgin / 7 96648-0 United States

1. "Roll with It" (12-inch remix) – 9:53
2. "Roll with It" (Steve Testifies dub) – 6:44
3. "The Morning Side" (7-inch version) – 3:57

== Personnel ==
- Steve Winwood – lead and backing vocals, acoustic piano, Hammond organ, Fairlight CMI, bass, drums
- Mike Lawler – keyboards
- The Memphis Horns
  - Wayne Jackson – trombone and trumpet
  - Andrew Love – tenor saxophone
- Tessa Niles – backing vocals
- Mark Williamson – backing vocals

== Charts ==
=== Weekly charts ===
Chart (1988)	Peak position
Australia (ARIA)	36
Canada Retail Singles (The Record)	1
Canada Top Singles (RPM)	1
Canada Adult Contemporary (RPM)	1
Italy Airplay (Music & Media)	1
Netherlands (Dutch Top 40 Tipparade)	9
Netherlands (Single Top 100)	81
New Zealand (Recorded Music NZ)	30
UK Singles (Official Charts)	53
US Billboard Hot 100	1
US Adult Contemporary (Billboard)	1
US Dance Club Songs (Billboard)	21
US Dance Singles Sales (Billboard)	2
US Hot R&B/Hip-Hop Songs (Billboard)	30
US Mainstream Rock (Billboard)	1
West Germany (GfK)	53

=== Year-end charts ===
Chart (1988)	Position
Canada Top Singles (RPM)	13
US Billboard Hot 100	10
US 12-inch Singles Sales (Billboard)	42
US Adult Contemporary (Billboard)	19
US Album Rock Tracks (Billboard)	22
