= Tom Lord-Alge =

American music engineer and mixer

- Born: January 17, 1962 (age 64)
- Origin: New Jersey, U.S.
- Genres: Rock; pop; indie rock; indie pop; pop punk
- Occupations: Mixer; record producer; audio engineer
- Website: tomlord-alge.com

Tom Lord-Alge (born January 17, 1962) is an American music engineer and mixer. He began his career at Unique Recording in New York. Subsequently, he was the resident mixer at what used to be known as "South Beach Studios", located on the ground floor of the Marlin Hotel in Miami.

Lord-Alge received two Grammy Awards for his work on Steve Winwood's Back in the High Life (1986), and Roll with It (1988), both winning in the Best Engineered Recording – Non-Classical category. His third Grammy was for Santana's Supernatural (1999), which won Album of the Year. Lord-Alge has mixed records for U2, Simple Minds, The Rolling Stones, Pink, Sevendust, Peter Gabriel, Jean-Jacques Goldman, OMD, Sarah McLachlan, Dave Matthews Band, Blink-182, Avril Lavigne, Hanson, Sum 41, Live, Manic Street Preachers, New Found Glory, Story of the Year and Marilyn Manson, The Moffatts, among others.

== Career ==
After doing live sound engineering for some time, Lord-Alge joined his brother Chris at Unique Recording in New York City in 1984. He began working as an assistant to Chris, who was then a staff engineer, and later became staff engineer until 1988.

Lord-Alge's first major project was engineering Steve Winwood's Grammy-winning album Back in the High Life (1986) including its number one hit song "Higher Love". He went on to engineer Winwood's follow up Roll with It (1988) including its chart-topping title track. He then left Unique Recording to work as a freelance engineer and mixer. After briefly working in production, Lord-Alge decided around 1990 to focus exclusively on mixing, citing Bob Clearmountain's example as an influence on that decision.

Lord-Alge's turning point as a mixing engineer was in 1993 after mixing Crash Test Dummies' God Shuffled His Feet, featuring their hit "Mmm Mmm Mmm Mmm". Shortly thereafter he mixed Live's multi-platinum Throwing Copper, which to date has sold over eight million copies in the United States. The success of these albums marked the beginning of Lord-Alge's professional career as a mix engineer. He mixed out of South Beach Studios in Miami prior to it closing, and is represented exclusively by Global Positioning Services Management in Santa Monica.

Like Chris, Lord-Alge is well known for his extensive use of compression in mix down as both a creative and functional technique.

== Personal life ==
Lord-Alge is one of four brothers, two more of whom are audio and mixing engineers (Chris and Jeff Lord-Alge), and two sisters (Meg and Lisa). Their mother, Vivian Lord, was a jazz singer and pianist, while their father sold jukeboxes for a living. Tom Lord-Alge credits his brother Chris as being a strong influence on his early development as an engineer and mixer.
