= Taj's Blues =

Compilation album by Taj Mahal
- Released: June 16, 1992
- Genre: Blues
- Label: Columbia
- Producer: Taj Mahal, David Rubinson

Taj Mahal chronology
Like Never Before (1991)	Taj's Blues (1992)	World Music (1993)

Professional ratings
Review scores
Source	Rating
AllMusic	4/5 stars
The Penguin Guide to Blues Recordings	3/4 stars

Taj's Blues is a compilation album by American blues artist Taj Mahal.

== Track listing ==
1. "Leaving Trunk" (Sleepy John Estes) - 4:48 - from Taj Mahal (1968)
2. "Statesboro Blues" (Blind Willie McTell) - 2:56 - from Taj Mahal (1968)
3. "Everybody's Got To Change Sometime" (Sleepy John Estes) - 2:56 - from Taj Mahal (1968)
4. "Bound to Love Me Sometime" (Traditional, arranged by Taj Mahal) 4:27 - from Recycling The Blues & Other Related Stuff (1972)
5. "Frankie & Albert" (Mississippi John Hurt) - 3:58 - from Oooh So Good 'n Blues (1973)
6. "East Bay Woman" (Taj Mahal) - 2:17 - previously unreleased
7. "Dust My Broom" (Elmore James) - 4:29 - from Oooh So Good 'n Blues (1973)
8. "Corinna" (Taj Mahal, Jesse Ed Davis) - 3:01 - from The Natch'l Blues (1968)
9. "Jellyroll" (Taj Mahal) - 3:13 - from The Natch'l Blues (1968)
10. "Fishin' Blues" (Henry Thomas) - 3:07 - from De Ole Folks at Home (1969)
11. "Sounder Medley: Needed Time #2 / Curiosity Blues / Horse Shoes / Needed Time #3" (Lightnin' Hopkins, Taj Mahal) - 5:26 - from Sounder (original soundtrack) (1972)
12. "Country Blues #1" (Taj Mahal, Jesse Ed Davis) - 2:36 - from De Ole Folks at Home (1969)
