= The Real Thing (Taj Mahal album) =

Live album by Taj Mahal
- Released: 1971 (CD in 2000)
- Recorded: February 13, 1971
- Venue: Fillmore East, New York City
- Genre: Blues
- Length: 66:51
- Label: Columbia/Legacy
- Producer: David Rubinson (original recording), Bob Irwin (CD reissue)

Taj Mahal chronology
Giant Step/De Ole Folks at Home (1969)	The Real Thing (1971)	Happy Just to Be Like I Am (1972)

Professional ratings
Review scores
Source	Rating
AllMusic	3.5/5 stars
Christgau's Record Guide	B
Entertainment Weekly	B+
The Penguin Guide to Blues Recordings	3/4 stars
Rolling Stone	(not rated)

The Real Thing is a double live album by Taj Mahal, released in 1971. It was recorded on February 13, 1971, at the Fillmore East in New York City and features Taj Mahal backed by a band that includes four tuba players.

== Track listing ==
All tracks by Taj Mahal except where noted.

1. "Fishin' Blues" (Henry Thomas) – 2:58
2. "Ain't Gwine to Whistle Dixie (Any Mo')" (Chuck Blackwell, Jesse Ed Davis, Gary Gilmore, Taj Mahal) – 9:11
3. "Sweet Mama Janisse" – 3:32
4. "Going Up to the Country and Paint My Mailbox Blue" – 3:24
5. "Big Kneed Gal" – 5:34
6. "You're Going to Need Somebody on Your Bond" (Blind Willie Johnson) – 6:13
7. "Tom and Sally Drake" – 3:39
8. "Diving Duck Blues" (Sleepy John Estes) – 3:46
9. "John, Ain' It Hard" – 5:30
10. "She Caught the Katy (And Left Me a Mule to Ride)" (Taj Mahal, Yank Rachell) – 4:08
  - Omitted from the vinyl issue, added to 2000 CD issue. Studio recording appears on The Natch'l Blues (1968).
11. "You Ain't No Street Walker Mama, Honey but I Do Love the Way You Strut Your Stuff" – 18:56

== Personnel ==
- Taj Mahal – vocals, blues harp, chromatic harmonica, National steel-bodied guitar, five-string guitar (banjo), fife
- Howard Johnson – tuba (BB♭, F), flugelhorn, baritone saxophone, brass arrangements
- Bob Stewart – tuba (CC), flugelhorn, trumpet
- Joseph Daley – tuba (BB♭), valve trombone
- Earle McIntyre – tuba (E♭), bass trombone
- Bill Rich – Electric bass
- John Simon – piano, electric piano
- John Hall – Electric guitar
- Greg Thomas – drums
- Kwasi "Rocky" DziDzournu – congas

Technical

- Tim Geelan, Glen Kolotkin, Frank Abbey, Jerry Smith – engineer
- Anna Hornisher – cover, artwork, design
- Irene Harris – cover photography
