= The Best of Taj Mahal, Volume 1 =

Greatest hits album by Taj Mahal
- Released: 1981
- Genre: Blues, electric blues
- Length: 42:20
- Language: English
- Label: Columbia
- Producer: Taj Mahal

Taj Mahal chronology
Going Home (1980)	The Best of Taj Mahal, Volume 1 (1981)	Taj's Blues (1992)

The Best of Taj Mahal, Volume 1 is a blues compilation album by American Taj Mahal.

== Track listing ==
1. "Leaving Trunk" – 4:51
2. "She Caught the Katy and Left Me a Mule to Ride" - 3:30
3. "Fishing Blues" - 3:06
4. "Farther On Down the Road" - 3:22
5. "You're Going to Need Somebody on Your Bond" - 6:17
6. "Cakewalk Into Town" - 2:33
7. "Chevrolet" - 2:42
8. "Johnny Too Bad" - 3:15
9. "Take a Giant Step" - 4:18 (Carole King, Gerry Goffin)
10. "Ain't Gwine Whistle Dixie (Any Mo')" - 8:28
- Produced by Taj Mahal
- Produced by David Rubinson for the Fillmore Corporation

== Personnel ==
- Taj Mahal
