= Maestro (Taj Mahal album) =

Studio album by Taj Mahal
- Released: September 30, 2008
- Studio: Ultratone Studios (Los Angeles, CA); Sonikwire Studios (Irvine, CA); Capitol Studios (Los Angeles, CA); Westlake Recording Studios (Los Angeles, CA); The Shed (New Orleans, LA); Fat Tuesday Recording Studio (Honolulu, HI)
- Genre: Blues
- Label: Heads Up
- Producer: Ben Harper; Phantom Blues Band; Taj Mahal; Warren Haynes

Taj Mahal chronology
The Essential Taj Mahal (2005)	Maestro (2008)	Hidden Treasures of Taj Mahal (2012)

Professional ratings
Aggregate scores
Source	Rating
Metacritic	64/100
Review scores
Source	Rating
AllMusic	4/5 stars
Entertainment Weekly	B+
PopMatters	6/10
The Guardian	3/5 stars

Maestro is a studio album by American musician Taj Mahal. It was released on September 30, 2008, via Heads Up International. Recording sessions took place at Ultratone, Capitol Studios and Westlake Recording Studios in Los Angeles, Sonikwire Studios in Irvine, The Shed in New Orleans, and Fat Tuesday Recording Studio in Honolulu. Production was handled by Taj Mahal himself, the Phantom Blues Band, Warren Haynes and Ben Harper. It features guest appearances from the Phantom Blues Band, with whom he had recorded the Grammy-nominated albums Señor Blues and Shoutin' in Key, Los Lobos, New Orleans Social Club, Angélique Kidjo, Ben Harper, Jack Johnson, Ziggy Marley and the Hula Blues Band. Other contributors include Toumani Diabaté, with whom he had recorded the album Kulanjan, and his daughter, singer-songwriter Deva Mahal, with whom he had recorded several children's albums in the past.

It received a Grammy Award for Best Contemporary Blues Album nomination at the 2009 51st Annual Grammy Awards, but lost to Dr. John and the Lower 911's City That Care Forgot.

== Track listing ==
No.	Title	Writer(s)	Producer(s)	Length
1.	"Scratch My Back"	James Moore	Taj Mahal; The Phantom Blues Band	4:20
2.	"Never Let You Go"	Deva Mahal; Henry St. Claire Fredericks	Taj Mahal	4:43
3.	"Dust Me Down"	Ben Harper	Ben Harper	3:28
4.	"Further on Down the Road"	Jesse Edwin Davis III; Fredericks	Taj Mahal; The Phantom Blues Band	4:47
5.	"Black Man, Brown Man"	Fredericks	Taj Mahal	3:52
6.	"Zanzibar"	Angélique Kidjo; Fredericks	Taj Mahal	5:52
7.	"TV Mama"	Lou Willie Turner	Taj Mahal	3:43
8.	"I Can Make You Happy"	Fredericks	Warren Haynes	4:59
9.	"Slow Drag"	Fredericks	Taj Mahal; The Phantom Blues Band	6:33
10.	"Hello Josephine"	Antoine Domino; David Bartholomew	Warren Haynes	4:48
11.	"Strong Man Holler"	Fredericks	Taj Mahal	5:49
12.	"Diddy Wah Diddy"	Ellas McDaniel; Willie Dixon	Taj Mahal; The Phantom Blues Band	4:36

Vinyl bonus tracks
No.	Title	Writer(s)	Length
13.	"Mambo No. 5 (7-11)"	Pérez Prado
14.	"On a Little Bamboo Bridge"	Al Sherman; Archie Fletcher

== Personnel ==
- Henry St. Claire "Taj Mahal" Fredericks – vocals (tracks: 1–12, 14), ukulele (track 2), harmonica (tracks: 3, 4, 7, 8, 12), guitar (tracks: 3, 6, 8, 10, 11), banjo (tracks: 4, 5, 9), Epiphone Emperor guitar (track 13), National steelbodied guitar (track 14), producer (tracks: 1, 2, 4–7, 9, 11–13)
- Deva Mahal – backing vocals (track 2)
- Ben Harper – vocals & producer (track 3)
- C.C. White – backing vocals (track 3)
- Pebbles Phillips – backing vocals (track 3)
- Jack Johnson – vocals (track 4)
- David Nesta "Ziggy" Marley – vocals (track 5)
- Tracy Hazzard – backing vocals (track 5)
- Angélique Kidjo – vocals (track 6)
- Johnny Lee Schell – guitar (tracks: 1, 4, 9, 12, 13), engineering (tracks: 1, 4, 6, 9, 11–13)
- Cesar Rosas – guitar (tracks: 2, 7)
- David Hidalgo – guitar (tracks: 2, 7)
- Louis Pérez Jr. – jarana (tracks: 2, 7)
- Jason Mozersky – guitar (track 3)
- Takeshi Akimoto – guitar (track 5)
- Leo Nocentelli – guitar (tracks: 8, 10)
- Pancho Graham – slack-key guitar & acoustic bass (track 14)
- Carlos Andrade – slack-key guitar (track 14)
- Fred Lunt – Hawaiian steel guitar (track 14)
- Mike Finnigan – keyboards (tracks: 1, 4, 9, 12, 13)
- Steve Berlin – organ (track 2), baritone and tenor saxophone (track 7)
- Jason Yates – keyboards (track 3)
- Michael Hyde – keyboards (track 5)
- Henry Butler – piano (tracks: 8, 10)
- Ivan Neville – Hammond B3 organ (tracks: 8, 10)
- Mick Weaver – Hammond B3 organ (track 11)
- Larry Fulcher – bass (tracks: 1, 4, 9, 12, 13)
- Conrad Lozano – bass (tracks: 2, 7)
- Jesse Ingalls – bass (track 3)
- Paul "Pablo" Stennett – bass (track 5)
- Bill Rich – bass (tracks: 6, 11)
- George Porter Jr. – bass (tracks: 8, 10)
- Tony Braunagel – drums (tracks: 1, 4, 9, 12, 13)
- Cougar Estrada – drums (track 2)
- Michael Jerome – drums & percussion (track 3)
- Carlton "Santa" Davis – drums (track 5)
- Angel Roche – percussion (track 5)
- Kester Smith – drums (tracks: 6, 11, 14), percussion (track 6)
- Debra Dobkin – percussion (track 6)
- Raymond Weber – drums (tracks: 8, 10)
- Joe Sublett – tenor saxophone (tracks: 1, 4, 9, 13), baritone saxophone (tracks: 12, 13)
- Rudy Costa – alto saxophone (track 5), clarinet (track 14)
- Darrell Leonard – trumpet (tracks: 1, 4, 9, 13), trombonium (tracks: 4, 12, 13)
- Angela Wellman – trombone (track 2)
- Toumani Diabaté – kora (track 6)
- Bassekou Kouyate – ngoni (track 6)
- Billy Branch – harmonica (track 11)
- Patrick Cockett – ukulele (track 14)
- Warren Haynes – producer (tracks: 8, 10)
- Jean Hebrail – vocal producer (track 6)
- Joe McGrath – engineering (tracks: 1, 4, 9, 12, 13), mixing
- Mark Johnson – engineering (tracks: 2, 7)
- Danny Kalb – engineering & recording (track 3)
- Robert Carranza – vocal recording (track 4)
- Marc Moreau – engineering (track 5)
- Gordie Johnson – engineering (tracks: 8, 10)
- Ron Pendragon – engineering & recording (track 14)
- George Horn – mastering
- Jay Blakesberg – photography
- Michael Crook – photography
- Baron Wolman – photography

== Charts ==
Chart (2008)	Peak position
UK Jazz & Blues Albums (OCC)	29
US Top Blues Albums (Billboard)	2
