= Live at Ronnie Scott's (Taj Mahal album) =

Live album by Taj Mahal
- Released: 1990
- Genre: Blues
- Label: Castle Communications

Taj Mahal chronology
| Shake Sugaree (1988) | Live at Ronnie Scott's (1990) | Mule Bone (1991) |

Professional ratings
Review scores
| Source | Rating |
|---|---|
| Allmusic | link |

Live at Ronnie Scott's is an album by American blues artist Taj Mahal recorded at Ronnie Scott's Jazz Club in 1988 and released in 1990.

== Track listing ==
1. "Big Blues"
2. "Mail Box Blues"
3. "Stagger Lee"
4. "Come On in My Kitchen"
5. "Local, Local Girl"
6. "Soothin'"
7. "Fishin' Blues"
8. "Statesboro' Blues"
9. "Everybody Is Somebody"
10. "Taj Mahal Interview"
