= The Essential Taj Mahal =

Greatest hits album by Taj Mahal
- Released: October 16, 2005
- Genre: Blues

Taj Mahal chronology
Mkutano Meets the Culture Musical Club of Zanzibar (2005)	The Essential Taj Mahal (2005)	Maestro (2008)

Professional ratings
Review scores
Source	Rating
AllMusic	4/5 stars
The Penguin Guide to Blues Recordings	3.5/4 stars

The Essential Taj Mahal is a "best of" album by American blues artist Taj Mahal. AllMusic stated that "The Essential Taj Mahal pulls together the bluesman's Columbia, Warner, Gramavision Private Music, and Hannibal labels' recordings, making it the first truly cross-licensed compilation of his work.

== Track listing ==
Disc 1

1. "Leaving Trunk"
2. "Statesboro Blues"
3. "Celebrated Walkin' Blues"
4. "She Caught the Katy (And Left Me a Mule to Ride)"
5. "Corinna"
6. "Going Up to the Country Paint My Mailbox Blue"
7. "Take a Giant Step"
8. "Six Days on the Road"
9. "Country Blues #1"
10. "Fishin' Blues"
11. "Ain't Gwine Whistle Dixie (Anymo')"
12. "You're Gonna Need Somebody on Your Bond"
13. "Happy Just to Be Like I Am"
14. "West Indian Revelation"
15. "Texas Woman Blues"
16. "Cakewalk into Town"
17. "Frankie and Albert"
18. "Railroad Bill"

Disc 2

1. "Johnny Too Bad"
2. "Slave Driver"
3. "Clara St. Kitts Woman"
4. "When I Feel the Sea Beneath My Soul"
5. "Satisfied 'n' Tickled Too"
6. "Love Theme in the Key of D"
7. "Everybody is Somebody"
8. "Crossing (Lonely Day)"
9. "Don't Call Us"
10. "Big Legged Mommas Are Back in Style"
11. "That's How Strong My Love is"
12. "Here in the Dark"
13. "Lovin' in My Baby's Eyes"
14. "Señor Blues"
15. "New Hula Blues"
16. "Queen Bee"
17. "Cruisin'"
18. "John Henry"
