= Shake Sugaree =

Studio album by Taj Mahal
- Released: 1988
- Studio: MatraSound, Kapaa, Hawaii
- Genre: Blues
- Label: Music For Little People
- Producer: Taj Mahal

Taj Mahal chronology
Taj (1987)	Shake Sugaree (1988)	Live at Ronnie Scott's (1990)

Professional ratings
Review scores
Source	Rating
AllMusic	3/5 stars

Shake Sugaree - Taj Mahal Sings and Plays for Children is a 1988 album by American blues artist Taj Mahal. The title comes from one of the tracks, and was itself the title track of a 1967 album by Elizabeth Cotten, recorded in February 1965. Authorship of the song is attributed to Cotten.

== Track listing ==
1. "Fishin' Blues"
2. "Brown Girl in the Ring"
3. "Light Rain"
4. "Quavi, Quavi"
5. "Shake Sugaree" (Elizabeth Cotten)
6. "Funky Bluesy ABC's"
7. "Talkin' John Henry"
8. "Railroad Bill"
9. "A Soulful Tune"
10. "Little Brown Dog"

== Personnel ==
- Taj Mahal - vocals, guitar, mandolin, harmonica
- Ahmen Mahal, Deva Mahal - backing vocals
