= Hanapepe Dream =

Studio album by Taj Mahal
- Released: 2001
- Recorded: at Moments, Bremen, Germany, August 14–16, 2000; Messenger Studio, Kauai, Hawaii, February 17, 2000
- Genre: Worldbeat, blues, reggae, world fusion
- Length: 44:57
- Label: Tradition & Moderne; Tone-Cool Records
- Producer: Petra Hanisch, Carey Williams

Taj Mahal chronology
Sing a Happy Song: The Warner Bros. Recordings (2001)	Hanapepe Dream (2001)	Martin Scorsese Presents the Blues - Taj Mahal (2003)

Professional ratings
Review scores
Source	Rating
AllMusic	4/5 stars
The Penguin Guide to Blues Recordings	2.5/4 stars

Hanapepe Dream is an album by American blues/world artist Taj Mahal and Hawaiian music group The Hula Blues Band. It is the second mutual recording for Taj and that band after Sacred Island, aka Taj Mahal and the Hula Blues.

== Track listing ==
1. "Great Big Boat" (Taj Mahal)
2. "Blackjack Davey" (Traditional, adapted by Taj Mahal)
3. "Moonlight Lady" (Carlos Andrade, Pat Cockett)
4. "King Edward's Throne" (Music: Taj Mahal, words: traditional)
5. "African Herbsman" (Richie Havens)
6. "Baby You're My Destiny" (Taj Mahal)
7. "Stagger Lee" (Traditional, arrangement: Taj Mahal)
8. "Living' On Easy" (Traditional)
9. "My Creole Belle" (Mississippi John Hurt)
10. "All Along The Watchtower" (Bob Dylan)
11. "Hanapepe Dream" (Traditional)
