= Blue Light Boogie =

Blue Light Boogie may refer to:

- "Blue Light Boogie" (song), a 1950 song by Louis Jordan
- Blue Light Boogie (album), a 1999 album by Taj Mahal
