= Martin Scorsese Presents the Blues – Taj Mahal =

Martin Scorsese Presents the Blues - Taj Mahal

Compilation album by Taj Mahal
- Released: September 9, 2003
- Genre: Blues

Taj Mahal chronology
Hanapepe Dream (2001)	Martin Scorsese Presents the Blues - Taj Mahal (2003)	Blues with a Feeling: The Very Best of Taj Mahal (2003)

Professional ratings
Review scores
Source	Rating
The Penguin Guide to Blues Recordings	3/4 stars

Martin Scorsese Presents the Blues – Taj Mahal is an album by American blues artist Taj Mahal.

== Track listing ==
1. "Leaving Trunk"
2. "Dust My Broom"
3. "Corrina"
4. "Chevrolet"
5. "Going Up to the Country, Paint My Mailbox Blue"
6. "Statesboro Blues - Blind Willie McTell"
7. "She Caught the Katy (And Left Me a Mule to Ride)"
8. "Checkin' Up on My Baby"
9. "Bound to Love Me Some"
10. "Queen Bee"
11. "You're Gonna Need Somebody on Your Bond"
12. "Fishin' Blues"
13. "Six Days on the Road"
14. "Freight Train"
15. "Ain't That a Lot of Love"
