= The Best of Taj Mahal =

Greatest hits album by Taj Mahal
- Released: 2000
- Genre: Blues
- Label: Columbia/Legacy

Taj Mahal chronology
Kulanjan (1999)	The Best of Taj Mahal (2000)	The Best of the Private Years (2000)

The Best of Taj Mahal is an album by American blues artist Taj Mahal, released in 2000.

AllMusic commented that the collection "... functions as a nice introduction to Mahal's music".

== Track listing ==
1. "Statesboro Blues"
2. "Leaving Trunk"
3. "Corrina"
4. "Going Up To The Country, Paint My Mailbox Blue"
5. "She Caught The Katy and Left Me a Mule To Ride"
6. "Take a Giant Step"
7. "Six Days On The Road"
8. "Farther On Down The Road (You Will Accompany Me)"
9. "Fishin' Blues"
10. "Ain't Gwine To Whistle Dixie (Any Mo')"
11. "You're Going To Need Somebody On Your Bond"
12. "Cakewalk Into Town"
13. "Oh Susannah"
14. "Frankie and Albert"
15. "Chevrolet"
16. "Johnny Too Bad"
17. "Sweet Mama Janisse"
