= Coconut Man =

Coconut Man may refer to:

- Coconut man, the name of Dr. Luke's character in the music video for "Price Tag" by Jessie J feat. B.o.B
- "Coconut Man", a song by Taj Mahal from the album Sacred Island
