= Live & Direct (Taj Mahal album) =

Live album by Taj Mahal
- Released: 1979
- Recorded: 10 May 1979, Crystal Clear Studios
- Genre: Blues
- Label: Crystal Clear Records
- Producer: Taj Mahal, Ed Wodenjak

Taj Mahal chronology
Evolution (The Most Recent) (1977)	Live & Direct (1979)	Going Home (1980)

Professional ratings
Review scores
Source	Rating
AllMusic	2.5/5 stars
The Encyclopedia of Popular Music	3/5 stars
The Penguin Guide to Blues Recordings	2.5/4 stars

Live & Direct is an album by American blues artist Taj Mahal and the International Rhythm Band.

== Critical reception ==
Rolling Stone wrote that "the African-inspired songs here are slight, the Brazilian excursion sounds tired, and the funk and R&B numbers are simply not credible."

== Track listing ==
All tracks composed by Taj Mahal; except where indicated

1. "Jorge Ben" (Jorge Ben, Taj Mahal)
2. "Reggae Number 1"
3. "You're Gonna Need Somebody" (Buffy Sainte-Marie)
4. "Little Brown Dog" (Traditional)
5. "Take a Giant Step" (Gerry Goffin, Carole King)
6. "L-O-V-E, Love"
7. "And Who" (Robert Greenidge, Rudy Costa, Taj Mahal)
8. "Suva Serenade"
9. "Airplay"

== Personnel ==
- Taj Mahal - electric guitar, piano, lead vocals

The International Rhythm Band

- Rudy Costa - alto and soprano saxophone, flute, pan pipe, kalimba
- Robert Greenidge - steel drums
- Bill Rich - bass
- Jumma Santos - congas, timbales, assorted percussion
- Kester Smith - drums
- Ella Jamerson, Geri Johnson, Bianca Oden, Verlin Sandles, Ola Marie Tyler, Carey Williams - backing vocals
