= Shoutin' in Key =

Live album by Taj Mahal
- Released: 2000
- Recorded: November 9–11, 1998
- Genre: Blues
- Length: 55:40
- Label: Hannibal
- Producer: Tony Braunagel

Taj Mahal chronology
The Best of the Private Years (2000)	Shoutin' in Key (2000)	Sing a Happy Song: The Warner Bros. Recordings (2001)

Professional ratings
Review scores
Source	Rating
Allmusic	2.5/5 stars

Shoutin' in Key is a live album by American blues artist Taj Mahal.

== Track listing ==
1. "Honky Tonk" (Billy Butler, Bill Doggett, Clifford Scott, Shep Shepherd) – 6:19
2. "EZ Rider" (Taj Mahal) – 3:20
3. "Ain't That a Lot of Love" (Homer Banks, Willa Dean Parker) – 3:10
4. "Ev'ry Wind (In the River)" (Parker B. Dollaghan, Richard G. Feldman, Mahal) – 5:14
5. "Stranger in My Own Hometown" (Percy Mayfield) – 2:55
6. "Woulda Coulda Shoulda" (Mahal) – 3:43
7. "Leaving Trunk" (John Estes) – 6:06
8. "Rain from the Sky" (Delroy Wilson) – 3:28
9. "Mailbox Blues" (Mahal) – 3:49
10. "Cruisin'" (Johnny Lee Schell, Mahal, Tony Braunagel) –3:47
11. "Corrina" (traditional, arr. Mahal, Jesse Ed Davis) – 3:44
12. "Hoochi Coochie Coo" (Hank Ballard, Billy Myles) – 3:39
13. "Sentidos Dulce" (Mahal) – 6:26

== Personnel ==
- Taj Mahal – lead vocals, guitar, harmonica, resonator guitar, percussion

=== Phantom Blues Band ===
- Tony Braunagel – drums, background vocals, producer
- Denny Freeman – guitar
- Larry Fulcher – bass, background vocals
- Darrell Leonard – trumpet, trombone, flugelhorn
- Joe Sublett – saxophones
- Mick Weaver – Hammond B3 organ, piano

== Production ==
- Terry Becker – live recording engineer
- Steve Bigas – second engineer
- Joe McGrath – post-production engineer, mixing
- Carey Williams – MC

Recorded at The Mint, Los Angeles, November 9—11, 1998.
