= Will the Circle Be Unbroken, Volume III =

Studio album by Nitty Gritty Dirt Band
- Released: 2002
- Studio: Scruggs Sound (Berry Hill, Tennessee)
- Genre: Country, country rock, folk rock, bluegrass
- Length: 103:15
- Label: Capitol Nashville
- Producer: Randy Scruggs, Nitty Gritty Dirt Band

Nitty Gritty Dirt Band chronology
Bang Bang Bang (1999)	Will the Circle Be Unbroken, Volume III (2002)	Welcome to Woody Creek (2004)

Professional ratings
Review scores
Source	Rating
AllMusic	4/5 stars

Will the Circle Be Unbroken, Volume III is the 2002 album from The Nitty Gritty Dirt Band. This album reached 18 on the US Country chart. Earlier albums in the series include Will the Circle Be Unbroken and Will the Circle Be Unbroken: Volume II.

== Track listing ==
Disc 1

1. "Take Me in Your Lifeboat" (Traditional) – 3:42
2. "Milk Cow Blues" (Kokomo Arnold) – 5:05
3. "I Find Jesus" (Jimmy Ibbotson) – 3:55
4. "Hold Whatcha Got" (Jimmy Martin) – 2:56
5. "Mama's Opry" (Iris DeMent) – 4:23
6. "Diamonds in the Rough" (A. P. Carter, Maybelle Carter, Sara Carter) – 3:40
7. "Lonesome River" (Carter Stanley) – 4:24
8. "Some Dark Holler" (Traditional) – 3:20
9. "The Lowlands" (Gary Scruggs) – 3:51
10. "Love, Please Come Home" (Leon Jackson) – 2:50
11. "Goodnight Irene" (Huddie Ledbetter, John A. Lomax) – 4:31
12. "I Know What It Means to be Lonesome" (James Brockman, James Kendis, Nathaniel Vincent) – 3:50
13. "I'll Be Faithful to You" (Paul Kennerley) – 2:34
14. "Tears in the Holston River" (John R. Cash) – 4:15

Disc 2

1. "Fishin' Blues" (Traditional) – 4:32
2. "Save It, Save It" (Charles Rufus Shoffner) – 1:59
3. "Wheels" (Chris Hillman, Gram Parsons) – 3:16
4. "Roll in My Sweet Baby's Arms" (Traditional) – 3:57
5. "Oh Cumberland" (Matraca Berg, Gary Harrison) – 4:22
6. "I Am a Pilgrim" (Traditional) – 4:10
7. "Sallie Ann" (Earl Scruggs) – 2:38
8. "Catfish John" (Bob McDill, Alan Reynolds) – 4:08
9. "Roll the Stone Away" (Jeff Hanna, Marcus Hummon) – 4:11
10. "All Prayed Up" (Vince Gill) – 3:11
11. "Return to Dismal Swamp II" (Walter McEuen, William McEuen) – 3:18
12. "There is a Time" (Mitchell Jayne, Rodney Dillard) – 3:33
13. "Will the Circle Be Unbroken/Glory, Glory" (A. P. Carter, Traditional) – 4:40
14. "Farther Along" (Traditional) – 1:30

Enhanced CD Extras
Disc 2 also contains a behind the scenes video of the song "Take Me in Your Lifeboat".

== Personnel ==
- Jeff Hanna – lead and harmony vocals, guitar, mandolin, National slide guitar, washboard
- Jimmy Ibbotson – lead and harmony vocals, snare, percussion box, guitar, bouzouki, drum box, kick drum, porch board
- Bob Carpenter – harmony vocals, accordion
- Jimmie Fadden – harmonica, snare, harmony vocal
- John McEuen – banjo, mandolin, frailing banjo, finger style lead guitar, harmony vocal

Featured Lead vocalists

- Del McCoury – lead vocal, guitar
- Doc Watson – lead vocal, guitar
- Randy Scruggs – lead vocal, guitar, banjo, mandolin
- Jimmy Martin – lead vocal, guitar
- Iris DeMent – lead vocal, guitar
- June Carter Cash – lead vocal, autoharp
- Sam Bush – lead vocal, mandolin
- Dwight Yoakam – lead vocal, guitar
- Jaime Hanna – lead vocal, guitar, sticks
- Jonathan McEuen – lead vocal, guitar
- Willie Nelson – lead vocal, guitar
- Matraca Berg – lead vocal, harmony vocal, guitar
- Tom Petty – lead vocal, guitar
- Pat Enright – lead vocal, guitar
- Emmylou Harris – lead vocal, guitar, harmony vocal
- Johnny Cash – lead vocal, guitar
- Taj Mahal – lead vocal, archtop guitar
- Alison Krauss – lead vocal, fiddle
- Vince Gill – lead vocal, guitar
- Rodney Dillard – lead vocals, guitar
- Ricky Skaggs – lead vocals, mandolin

Special guest musicians

- Robbie McCoury – banjo
- Ronnie McCoury – mandolin
- Glen Duncan – fiddle
- Byron House – upright bass
- Richard Watson – guitar
- Josh Graves – dobro
- Ray Martin – harmony vocal, mandolin
- David Nance – harmony vocal, dobro
- Kevin Grantt – upright bass
- Earl Scruggs – banjo
- Dan Dugmore – dobro
- Glenn Worf – upright bass
- Mickey Raphael – harmonica
- David Jackson – upright bass
- Alan O'Bryant – banjo
- Stuart Duncan – fiddle
- Mike Compton – mandolin
- Dennis Crouch – upright bass
- Vassar Clements – fiddle
- Jerry Douglas – dobro
- Barry Bales – upright bass
- Tony Rice – lead guitar

== Chart performance ==
Chart (2002)	Peak position
U.S. Billboard Top Country Albums	18
U.S. Billboard 200	134
