= Blue Light Boogie (album) =

Compilation album by Taj Mahal
- Released: 27 April 1999
- Genre: Blues
- Length: 47:23
- Language: English
- Label: Private Music

Taj Mahal chronology
In Progress & In Motion: 1965-1998 (1998)	Blue Light Boogie (1999)	Kulanjan (1999)

Professional ratings
Review scores
Source	Rating
AllMusic	3/5 stars
The New Rolling Stone Album Guide	2.5/5 stars

Blue Light Boogie is an album by American blues artist Taj Mahal.

== Track listing ==
No.	Title	Writer(s)	Length
1.	"River of Love"	Porter Carroll/Richard Feldman/Jimmy Scott	4:07
2.	"Honky Tonk Women"	Mick Jagger/Keith Richards	4:39
3.	"Don't Call Us"	Feldman/Mahal	4:20
4.	"Take a Giant Step"	Gerry Goffin/Carole King	4:38
5.	"Down Home Girl"	Artie Butler/Jerry Leiber	3:43
6.	"Feats Don't Fail Me Now"	Paul Barrère/Lowell George/Martin Kibbee	3:19
7.	"Dark Angel"	Marty Grebb/Steven Seagal	3:26
8.	"Big Legged Mamas Are Back in Style"	Mahal	4:18
9.	"John the Revelator"	Rusty Goodman/Son House	3:54
10.	"Blue Light Boogie"	Dave Bartholomew/Jessie Mae Robinson	4:05
11.	"She Caught the Katy (And Left Me a Mule To Ride)"	Mahal/Yank Rachell	3:40
12.	"Mercedes Benz"	Janis Joplin/Michael McClure/Bob Neuwirth	3:14
