= Deva Mahal =

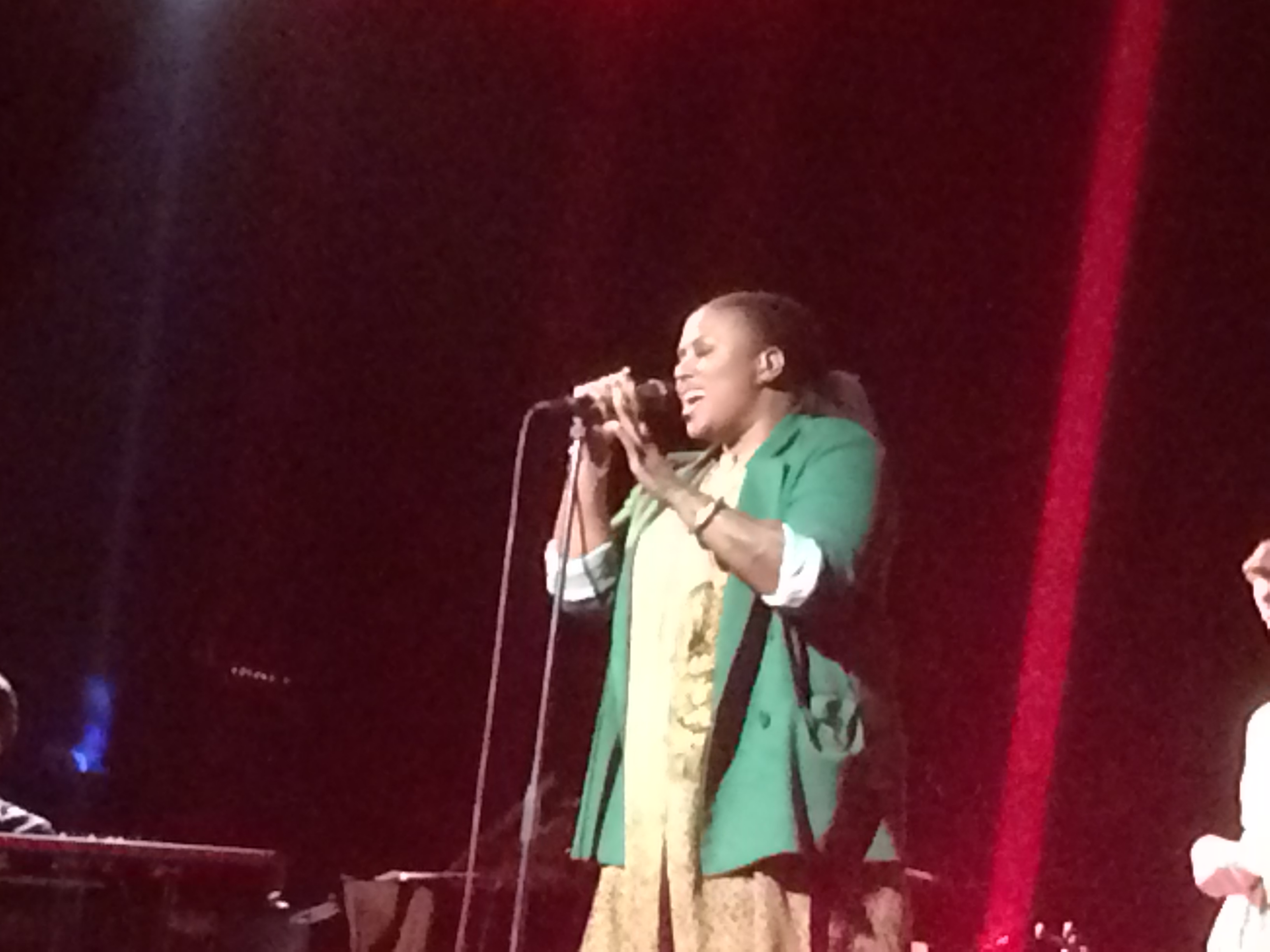
- Mahal in 2018

Background information
- Born: January 1, 1982 (age 44); Hawaii
- Genres: Soul, R&B
- Occupation: Singer
- Years active: 2017–present

Deva Salote Mahal (pronounced 'diva') is a soul and R&B singer. Mahal is the daughter of American blues musician Taj Mahal.

Deva joined father Taj Mahal in Michael Dorf's tribute to Aretha Franklin at Carnegie Hall in New York City on March 6, 2017. They performed "Chain of Fools". Other artists that performed included Todd Rundgren and Sarah Dash. One year later, Mahal returned to Carnegie Hall for Dorf's next tribute night, "The Music of Led Zeppelin". She was joined by Dap-Kings guitarist Binky Griptite on "Your Time Is Gonna Come".

== Early life ==
Deva Mahal was born in Hawaii to parents Taj Mahal and Inshirah Mahal. When she was 17, they moved to New Zealand before settling in New York City. She played with various artists around New York before pursuing a career as a solo artist.

== Career ==
=== Pre-2017: Early work ===
Mahal began writing and performing music as a child, gigging from age 5. She has worked with artists including TV on the Radio, Sharon Jones & The Dap Kings and Fat Freddy's Drop. Mahal provided backing vocals on Hollie Smith's Long Player and Fat Freddy's Drop's album Based on a True Story, track "Wandering Eye". She also collaborated with keyboardist Steph Brown in the band "Fredericks Brown" The duo toured and put out a pair of EPs together with guitarist Michael Taylor.

=== 2017: Deva Mahal EP ===
Mahal launched her solo career by initially releasing three songs as a self-titled extended play, Deva Mahal, in October 2017.

=== 2018: Run Deep ===
Mahal released her debut album 'Run Deep' March 23, 2018. The album was produced by Scott Jacoby. GRAMMY.com revealed she was their No. 1 'Best New Bands' from South by Southwest 2018.

=== 2019: "Goddamn" and "Your Only One" ===
Mahal released two singles, "Goddamn" and "Your Only One", following her debut album Run Deep. The singles were co-produced by Mahal and Son Little.

=== Musical style ===
Mahal's musical style ranges from Soul, Funk, R&B and Blues and she cites Tracy Chapman, Nina Simone and Lauryn Hill as some of her influences. Her soulful vocal style has been compared to Amy Winehouse.

== Personal life ==
In 2020, Mahal was featured on the second season of Netflix's dating reality show Dating Around where she identified as being attracted to both men and women. In the third episode, titled "Deva", she states she's been living in New Orleans since December 2019.

== Discography ==
=== Albums ===
Title	Album details
Run Deep	Released: March 23, 2018; Label: Motéma Music; Format: Digital download, streaming, CD, vinyl

List of albums (Appears on)
Title	Album details
Maestro	Released: 2008; Label: Motéma Music; Format: Digital download, streaming, CD

=== Extended plays ===
List of extended plays
Title	Extended play details
Deva Mahal	Released: October 27, 2017; Label: Motéma Music; Format: Digital download, streaming

=== Run Deep track listing ===
1. "Can't Call It Love"
2. "Snakes"
3. "Fire"
4. "Dream"
5. "Shards"
6. "Run Deep" (featuring Coco Peila)
7. "Turnt Up" (featuring Allen Stone)
8. "Superman" (Interlude)
9. "Optimist"
10. "Wicked"
11. "It's Down to You"
12. "Take a Giant Step"
