= Happy Just to Be Like I Am =

Studio album by Taj Mahal
- Released: 1971
- Genre: Blues
- Length: 42:36
- Label: Columbia
- Producers: Taj Mahal, David Rubinson

Taj Mahal chronology
The Real Thing (1971)	Happy Just to Be Like I Am (1971)	Recycling The Blues & Other Related Stuff (1972)

Professional ratings
Review scores
Source	Rating
AllMusic	3.5/5 stars
Christgau's Record Guide	B+
The Encyclopedia of Popular Music	2/5 stars
Rolling Stone	2/4 stars

Happy Just to Be Like I Am is the fourth studio album by American blues artist Taj Mahal.

== Reception ==
Christgau's Record Guide said in their review: "this relaxed, witty survey of musical Afro-America is strongest when its compositions verge on interpretations". Disc and Music Echo called it a "fine album, it's funky and it's gutsy, and there's splended brass on it". Rolling Stone Magazine said it is a "loose riotous blues 'n roots album", and that Taj Mahal is "nearly alone carrying the torch of the country music blues for other young black musicians to hear".

Eric Zoeckler wrote in the St. Louis Post-Dispatch that it is the "unconventional mixture of instruments, Taj's six-holed fife, a section of four tubas, gung-ko-gwees, flugelhorns and steel bodied guitars, that makes this recording the delight that it is".

== Track listing ==
All tracks composed by Taj Mahal; except where indicated

1. "Happy Just to Be Like I Am" (3:49)
2. "Stealin'" (Gus Cannon) (6:58)
3. "Oh, Susannah" (Traditional) (5:19)
4. "Eighteen Hammers" (5:45)
5. "Tomorrow May Not Be Your Day" (4:14)
6. "Chevrolet" (Ed Young, Lonnie Young) (2:45)
7. "West Indian Revelation (AKA West Indian Reservation)" (6:09)
8. "Black Spirit Boogie" (7:10)

== Personnel ==
- Taj Mahal - guitar, steel guitar, mandolin
- Bill Rich - bass
- Howard Johnson - baritone saxophone
- Jesse Ed Davis - guitar on "Oh Susanna" and "Chevrolet"
- Earl McIntyre - trombone
- Andy Narell - steel drums on "West Indian Revelation"
- John Simon - piano
- Hoshal Wright - guitar
- Kwasi "Rocky" Dzidzornu - conga
- Bob Stewart - flugelhorn
- Joseph Daley - tuba
- James Charles Otey, Jr. - drums

Technical

- Glen Kolotkin - engineer
- John Simon, Taj Mahal - mixing
