= Sing a Happy Song: The Warner Bros. Recordings =

Compilation album by Taj Mahal
- Released: August 23, 2001
- Genre: Blues

Taj Mahal chronology
Shoutin' in Key (2000)	Sing a Happy Song: The Warner Bros. Recordings (2001)	Hanapepe Dream (2001)

Professional ratings
Review scores
Source	Rating
AllMusic	2.5/5 stars
Rhino	not rated

Sing a Happy Song: The Warner Bros. Recordings is an album by American blues artist Taj Mahal.

== Track listing ==
Disc 1

1. "You Got It"
2. "Freight Train"
3. "Baby, You're My Destiny"
4. "Sailin' Into Walker's Cay"
5. "Truck Driver's Two-Step"
6. "The Four Mills Brothers"
7. "Honey Babe"
8. "Curry"
9. "Ain't Gwine Whistle Dixie (Any Mo')"
10. "Freight Train"
11. "Going Up to the Country, Paint My Mailbox Blue"
12. "Blackjack Davy"
13. "Truck Driver's Two-Step"
14. "Ain't Nobody's Business But My Own"
15. "Johnny Too Bad"

Disc 2

1. "Love Theme in the Key of D"
2. "Funky Butt"
3. "Brother's Doin' Time"
4. "Night Rider"
5. "Free the Brothers"
6. "Sentidos Dulce (Sweet Feelings)"
7. "The Funeral March"
8. "Malcolm's Song"
9. "David and Angela"
10. "Sing a Happy Song"
11. "Queen Bee"
12. "Lowdown Showdown"
13. "The Most Recent (Evolution) of Muthafusticus Modernusticus"
14. "Why You Do Me This Way"
15. "Salsa De Laventille"
16. "The Big Blues"
17. "Highnite"
18. "Southbound with the Hammer Down"
