= Mkutano Meets the Culture Musical Club of Zanzibar =

Studio album by Taj Mahal
- Released: 2005
- Recorded: September 13–17, 2003
- Genre: Blues
- Length: 48:28
- Label: Tradition & Moderne
- Producer: Petra Hanisch

Taj Mahal chronology
Live Catch (2004)	Mkutano Meets the Culture Musical Club of Zanzibar (2005)	The Essential Taj Mahal (2005)

Professional ratings
Review scores
Source	Rating
The Penguin Guide to Blues Recordings	3/4 stars

Mkutano Meets the Culture Musical Club of Zanzibar is an album by American blues artist Taj Mahal.

== Track listing ==
All songs written by Taj Mahal except as noted.

1. "Dhow Countries" – 7:48
2. "Muhoga wa jang'ombe" (Maalim Shaaban) – 6:11
3. "Zanzibar" – 3:19
4. "Catfish Blues" – 6:22
5. "Naahidi Kulienzi" (Makame Faki, Fatma Abdisalam) – 5:53
6. "Mkutano" – 3:52
7. "Done Changed My Way of Living" – 5:29
8. "M'Banjo" – 3:29
9. "Mpunga " (Chimbeni Kheri) – 6:05

== Personnel ==
- Taj Mahal - Banjo
- Kester Smith - Drums
- Bill Rich - Electric Bass
- Foum Faki - Dumbak, Bongos
- Mahmoud Juma - Double Bass
- Salah Yussuf - Dumbak, Bongos
- Rajab Suleiman - Gamun, Accordion
- Said Nassor - Udi
- Said Mwinyi - Accordion
- Haj Juma Wadi - Nai
- Taimur Rukun - Accordion
- Amour Haj - Sanduku
- Kesi Juma - First Violin
- Juma Shadhili - Violin
- Juma Abdallah - Violin
- Bi Kidude - Vocals
- Rukia Ramadhani - Vocals
- Makame Faki - Vocals
