= Recycling The Blues & Other Related Stuff =

Recycling the Blues & Other Related Stuff

Studio album by Taj Mahal
- Released: 1972
- Genre: Blues, acoustic blues
- Label: Columbia
- Producer: Taj Mahal

Taj Mahal chronology
| Happy Just to Be Like I Am (1971) | Recycling the Blues & Other Related Stuff (1972) | Oooh So Good 'n Blues (1973) |

Professional ratings
Review scores
| Source | Rating |
|---|---|
| AllMusic | 3/5 stars |
| Christgau's Record Guide | B |
| Record Collector | 4/5 stars |
| Rolling Stone | not rated |

Recycling the Blues & Other Related Stuff is the fifth studio album by Taj Mahal. Tracks 1–7 were recorded live; tracks 8–11 are studio recordings. The album cover shows a photograph of Taj Majal and Mississippi John Hurt taken by David Gahr backstage at the Newport Folk Festival in July 1964.

== Track listing ==
All songs written by Taj Mahal except as noted.

1. "Conch Intro" (not credited) – :30
2. "Kalimba" – 1:35
3. "Bound to Love Me Some" (Traditional) – 4:21
4. "Ricochet" – 4:17
5. "A Free Song (Rise Up Children Shake the Devil Out of Your Soul)" – 3:40
6. "Corinna" (Jesse Ed Davis, Taj Mahal) – 2:20
7. "Conch: Close" (not credited) – :33
8. "Cakewalk Into Town" – 2:32
9. "Sweet Home Chicago" (Traditional; Robert Johnson) – 6:45
10. "Texas Woman Blues" – 2:55
11. "Gitano Negro" – 8:30

== Personnel ==
- Taj Mahal - steel-bodied guitar, kalimba, banjo, conch, hand claps, upright bass
- The Pointer Sisters - backing vocals on "Sweet Home Chicago" and "Texas Woman Blues"
- Howard Johnson - hand claps and tuba on "Cakewalk Into Town"

Technical

- David Brown, George Engfer - engineer
