= Taj (album) =

Studio album by Taj Mahal
- Released: 1987
- Genre: Blues
- Label: Gramavision
- Producer: Taj Mahal

Taj Mahal chronology
| Going Home (1980) | Taj (1987) | Shake Sugaree (1988) |

Professional ratings
Review scores
| Source | Rating |
|---|---|
| Allmusic | 3/5 stars |

Taj is an album by American blues artist Taj Mahal. The cover photograph was by Robert Mapplethorpe.

== Track listing ==
All tracks composed by Taj Mahal; except where indicated

1. "Everybody is Somebody" (The Mighty Shadow)
2. "Paradise"
3. "Do I Love Her"
4. "Light of the Pacific" (Toni Fonoti)
5. "'Deed I Do"
6. "Soothin'" (Jae Mason)
7. "Pillow Talk" (Michael Burton, Sylvia Robinson)
8. "Local Local Girl"
9. "Kauai Kalypso"
10. "French Letter" (Toni Fonoti)

== Personnel ==
- Taj Mahal - acoustic and electric guitars, bass, percussion, keyboards, harmonica, lead and background vocals
- Jeanette Acosta - synthesizer
- Wayne Henderson - keyboards
- Ray Fitzpatrick - bass, percussion
- Inshirah Mahal - congas, percussion
- Larry McDonald - congas, percussion
- Babatunde Olatunji - djembe, congas, shekere, percussion
- Ralph MacDonald - congas, tambourine, percussion
- Robert Greenidge - steel drums, percussion
- Ozzie Williams - drums, DBX drum programming
- Kester Smith - drums
- Chris Simpson - nylon stringed Spanish guitar
- Tony Jones - electric bass, electric guitar
- Fred Lunt - steel guitar
- Jesse Ed Davis - lead guitar
- Kenny Lee Lewis - rhythm guitar
- Reggie Lucas - guitar
- Rudy Costa - alto saxophone
- Ron Brown - tenor saxophone
- Fernando Pullum - trumpet
- Larry Gittens - trumpet
- Garnett Brown - trombone
- Duane Benjamin - trombone
- Melody McCully - background vocals
- Pamela Vincent - background vocals
- Joyce Wilson - background vocals
