= Giant Step/De Ole Folks at Home =

Studio album by Taj Mahal
- Released: 1969
- Genres: Blues, country blues, Delta blues, Cajun
- Length: 69:15
- Label: Columbia
- Producer: David Rubinson

Taj Mahal chronology
The Natch'l Blues (1968)	Giant Step/De Ole Folks at Home (1969)	The Real Thing (1971)

Professional ratings
Review scores
Source	Rating
AllMusic	4.5/5 stars
The Penguin Guide to Blues Recordings	3/4 stars
Rolling Stone	(unfavorable)

Giant Step/De Ole Folks at Home is the third studio album by American blues musician Taj Mahal. A double album, the first disc (Giant Step) is electric, while the second (De Ole Folks at Home) is acoustic. Esquire included the album at number 27 on its list of "The 75 Albums Every Man Should Own".

== Track listing ==
Giant Step

1. "Ain't Gwine Whistle Dixie No More" (Taj Mahal, Jesse Ed Davis, Gary Gilmore, Chuck Blackwell)
2. "Take a Giant Step" (Carole King, Gerry Goffin)
3. "Give Your Woman What She Wants" (Taj Mahal, Joel Hirschhorn)
4. "Good Morning Little Schoolgirl" (Don Level, Bob Love)
5. "You're Gonna Need Somebody on Your Bond" (Blind Willie Johnson)
6. "Six Days on the Road" (Carl Montgomery, Earl Green)
7. "Farther on Down the Road (You Will Accompany Me)" (Taj Mahal, Jesse Ed Davis, Gary Gilmore, Chuck Blackwell)
8. "Keep Your Hands Off Her" (Huddie Ledbetter)
9. "Bacon Fat" (Robbie Robertson, Garth Hudson)

De Ole Folks at Home

1. "Linin' Track" (Huddie Ledbetter)
2. "Country Blues No. 1" (Traditional; arranged by Taj Mahal)
3. "Wild Ox Moan" (Vera Hall, Ruby Pickens Tartt)
4. "Light Rain Blues" (Taj Mahal)
5. "Little Soulful Tune" (Taj Mahal)
6. "Candy Man" (Rev. Gary Davis)
7. "Cluck Old Hen" (Traditional; arranged by Taj Mahal)
8. "Colored Aristocracy" (Traditional; arranged by Taj Mahal)
9. "Blind Boy Rag" (Taj Mahal)
10. "Stagger Lee" (Harold Logan, Lloyd Price)
11. "Cajun Tune" (Taj Mahal)
12. "Fishin' Blues" (Henry Thomas, Taj Mahal)
13. "Annie's Lover" (Traditional; arranged by Taj Mahal)

== Personnel ==
Giant Step

- Taj Mahal - vocals, harmonica, banjo, Mississippi national steel-bodied guitar
- Jesse Ed Davis - electric guitar, acoustic guitar, piano, organ
- Gary Gilmore - electric bass
- Chuck "Brother" Blackwell - drums

De Ole Folks at Home

- Taj Mahal - vocals, harmonica, guitar, banjo

Technical

- Brian Ross-Myring, Chris Hinshaw, Jerry Hochman - engineer
- Virginia Team - cover design
- Jesse Ed Davis - typography/hand lettering
