= Mule Bone (album) =

Studio album by Taj Mahal
- Released: November 1, 1991
- Genre: Blues
- Label: Gramavision
- Producer: Taj Mahal

Taj Mahal chronology
Live at Ronnie Scott's (1990)	Mule Bone (1991)	Like Never Before (1991)

Professional ratings
Review scores
Source	Rating
AllMusic	3/5 stars

Mule Bone is an album by American blues artist Taj Mahal. All lyrics are by Langston Hughes. Taj Mahal was nominated for a Grammy Award for his music for the Broadway staging of the play of the same name.

== Track listing ==
1. "Jubilee (Opening Theme)"
2. "Graveyard Mule (Hambone Rhyme)"
3. "Me and the Mule"
4. "Song for a Banjo Dance"
5. "But I Rode Some"
6. "Hey Hey Blues"
7. "Shake That Thing"
8. "Intermission Blues"
9. "Crossing (Lonely Day)"
10. "Bound No'th Blues"
11. "Finale"

== Personnel ==
- Taj Mahal - keyboards, bass, guitar, harmonica, banjo
- Abdul Wali - guitar
- Calvin "Fuzzy" Samuel - bass
- Kim Jordan - keyboards, synthesizer, percussion
- Marc Singer, Mike Sena - drums, percussion
