= Phantom Blues =

Studio album by Taj Mahal
- Released: February 27, 1996
- Recorded: May 8–14, 1995
- Studios: Sound City Studios, Van Nuys, CA
- Genre: Blues
- Label: Private Music
- Producer: John Porter

Taj Mahal chronology
Mumtaz Mahal (1995)	Phantom Blues (1996)	Señor Blues (1997)

Professional ratings
Review scores
Source	Rating
AllMusic	2.5/5 stars
The Penguin Guide to Blues Recordings	3/4 stars

Phantom Blues is a studio album by American blues artist Taj Mahal.

== Track listing ==
1. "Lovin' in My Baby's Eyes" (Taj Mahal)
2. "Cheatin' On You" (Jon Cleary)
3. "The Hustle Is On" (H.E. Owens)
4. "Here in the Dark" (Bernard Anders)
5. "Fanning the Flames" (Jon Cleary)
6. "I Need Your Loving" (Clarence Lewis, Don Gardner, James McDougal, Morris Levy)
7. "Ooh Poo Pah Doo" (Jessie Hill)
8. "Lonely Avenue" (Doc Pomus)
9. "Don't Tell Me" (Pat McLaughlin)
10. "What Am I Living For?" (Art Harris, Fred Jay)
11. "We're Gonna Make It" (Billy Davis, Carl William Smith, Gene Barge, Raynard Miner)
12. "Let the Four Winds Blow" (Dave Bartholomew, Antoine "Fats" Domino)
13. "(You've Got to) Love Her with a Feeling" (Freddie King, Sonny Thompson)
14. "The Car of Your Dreams" (James Kelly)

== Personnel ==
- Taj Mahal - lead vocals, dobro, harmonica
- Bonnie Raitt - additional vocal on 6
- Dean Parks - lead guitar on 5
- Eric Clapton - lead guitar on 4 and 13
- Joe McGrath, John Parks, Johnny Lee Schell - guitar
- Mike Campbell - 12-string guitar on 1
- John Porter - lead, acoustic and slide guitar
- James "Hutch" Hutchinson - bass guitar on 1
- Larry Fulcher - bass guitar on all tracks, except 1
- David Hidalgo - accordion on 12
- Jon Brion - chamberlin on 7, guitar on 14
- Jon Cleary - guitar, piano, Wurlitzer, clarinet
- Mick Weaver - organ
- Tony Braunagel - drums, percussion
- Myric "Freeze" Guillory - rubboard
- Bernard "Dr. B." Anderson, Joe Sublett - tenor saxophone
- Darrell Leonard - trumpet, trombone
- Alfie Silas Durio, Billie Barnum, Sir Harry Bowens, Regina Taylor, Sweet Pea Atkinson, Terrence Forsythe - backing vocals
