= Hidden Treasures of Taj Mahal =

Compilation album by Taj Mahal
- Released: 21 August 2012
- Recorded: 1969–1973
- Genre: Blues

Taj Mahal chronology
Maestro (2008)	Hidden Treasures of Taj Mahal (2012)

Hidden Treasures of Taj Mahal is a compilation album by American blues artist Taj Mahal. The first disc contains previously unreleased studio tracks recorded between 1969 and 1973. The second disc contains full live concert from April 18, 1970, at Royal Albert Hall in London, England.

== Track listing ==
=== Disc 1 ===
1. "Chainey Do"
2. "Sweet Mama Janisse" (Feb, 1970, Criteria Recording Studios)
3. "Yan Nah Mama Loo"
4. "Tomorrow May Not Be Your Day"
5. "I Pity The Poor Immigrant"
6. "Jacob's Ladder"
7. "Ain t Gwine Whistle Dixie (Any Mo')"
8. "Sweet Mama Janisse" (Jan, 1971 Bearsville Recording Studios, Woodstock, NY)
9. "You Ain t No Streetwalker, Honey But I Do Love The Way You Strut Your Stuff"
10. "Good Morning Little School Girl"
11. "Shady Grove"
12. "Butter"

=== Disc 2 ===
1. "Runnin By The Riverside"
2. "John, Ain't It Hard"
3. "Band Introduction"
4. "Sweet Mama Janisse"
5. "Big Fat"
6. "Diving Duck Blues"
7. "Checkin' Up On My Baby"
8. "Oh Susanna"
9. "Bacon Fat"
10. "Tomorrow May Not Be Your Day"
