= Blues with a Feeling: The Very Best of Taj Mahal =

Greatest hits album by Taj Mahal
- Released: September 23, 2003
- Genre: Blues
- Label: RCA/Victor

Taj Mahal chronology
Martin Scorsese Presents the Blues – Taj Mahal (2003)	Blues with a Feeling: The Very Best of Taj Mahal (2003)	Live Catch (2004)

Professional ratings
Review scores
Source	Rating
AllMusic	4/5 stars
The New Rolling Stone Album Guide	3.5/5 stars
The Penguin Guide to Blues Recordings	3/4 stars

Blues with a Feeling: The Very Best of Taj Mahal is an album by American blues artist Taj Mahal.

== Track listing ==
1. "Señor Blues"
2. "Don't Call Us"
3. "(You've Got to) Love Her with a Feeling"
4. "Lovin' in My Baby's Eyes"
5. "Betty and Dupree"
6. "Here in the Dark"
7. "That's How Strong My Love Is"
8. "Lonely Avenue"
9. "Mockingbird"
10. "Mailbox Blues"
11. "Think"
12. "Sitting on Top of the World"
13. "Mind Your Own Business"
14. "Cakewalk Into Town"
15. "Blues with a Feeling"
16. "Take a Giant Step"
17. "The New Hula Blues"
18. "The Hustle Is On"
19. "Let the Four Winds Blow"
20. "Blue Light Boogie"
