= In Progress & in Motion: 1965–1998 =

In Progress & In Motion: 1965-1998

Compilation album by Taj Mahal
- Released: October 13, 1998
- Genre: Blues

Taj Mahal chronology
Sacred Island (1998)	In Progress & In Motion: 1965-1998 (1998)	Blue Light Boogie (1999)

Professional ratings
Review scores
Source	Rating
The Penguin Guide to Blues Recordings	3.5/4 stars

In Progress & In Motion: 1965-1998 is a compilation album by American blues artist Taj Mahal, which was released in 1998.

== Track listing ==
Disc 1

1. "You're Gonna Need Somebody on Your Bond"
2. "Corrina"
3. "Checkin' Up on My Baby"
4. "Leavin' Trunk"
5. "Buck Dancer's Choice"
6. "Going Up to the Country Paint My Mailbox Blue"
7. "She Caught the Katy and Left Me a Mule to Ride"
8. "Ain't Gwine Whistle Dixie (Any Mo')"
9. "Stagger Lee"
10. "Built for Comfort"
11. "Natural Man"
12. "Railroad Bill"
13. "Texas Woman Blues"
14. "Early in the Morning"
15. "Dust My Broom"
16. "Blind Boy Rag"

Disc 2

1. "Oh Susannah"
2. "Cakewalk into Town"
3. "Fishin' Blues (1)"
4. "Nobody's Business But My Own"
5. "Sweet Mama Janisse"
6. "Little Red Hen Blues"
7. "Mary Don't You Weep"
8. "Sweet Home Chicago"
9. "Frankie And Albert"
10. "M'banjo"
11. "Statesboro Blues"
12. "Bye and Bye"
13. "Six Days on the Road"
14. "We Gonna Rock"
15. "Ain't It Funky Now"
16. "Tom and Sally Drake"
17. "Fishin' Blues"
18. "Blues with a Feeling"
19. "Freight Train"

Disc 3

1. "When I Feel the Sea Beneath My Soul"
2. "West Indian Revelation"
3. "Eighteen Hammers"
4. "Johnny Too Bad"
5. "Slave Driver"
6. "Clara St Kitts Woman"
7. "Do I Love Her"
8. "Everybody Is Somebody"
9. "But I Rode Some"
10. "Crossing"
11. "Sentidos Dulce"
12. "Most Recent Evolution of Muthafustieus Modernusticus"
13. "Curry"
14. "Follow the Drinking Gourd"
15. "Day O (The Banana Boat Song)"
16. "Little Brown Dog"
17. "Señor Blues"
18. "Ain't That a Lot of Love"
19. "Take a Giant Step"
