= Live Catch =

Live album by Taj Mahal
- Released: 2004
- Genre: Blues

Taj Mahal chronology
Blues with a Feeling: The Very Best of Taj Mahal (2003)	Live Catch (2004)	Mkutano Meets the Culture Musical Club of Zanzibar (2005)

Live Catch is an album by American blues artist Taj Mahal.

== Track listing ==
1. "Black Jack Davey"
2. "New Hula Blues"
3. "Good Morning Miss Brown"
4. "Annie Mae"
5. "Fishin' Blues"
6. "Going Up to the Country, Paint My Mailbox Blue"
7. "Big Blues"
8. "Creole Belle"
9. "Corinna"
10. "Stagger Lee"
11. "Freight Train"
12. "Sittin' on Top of the World"
13. "Blues Ain't Nothin'"
14. "Lovin' in My Baby's Eyes"
