= Evolution (The Most Recent) =

Studio album by Taj Mahal
- Released: 1977
- Genre: Blues
- Label: Warner Bros.

Taj Mahal chronology
Brothers (1977 soundtrack) (1977)	Evolution (The Most Recent) (1977)	Live & Direct (1979)

Professional ratings
Review scores
Source	Rating
AllMusic	2.5/5 stars
Christgau's Record Guide	C+
The Encyclopedia of Popular Music	2/5 stars

Evolution (The Most Recent) is an album by the American musician Taj Mahal, released in 1977.

== Track listing ==
1. "Sing a Happy Song"
2. "Queen Bee"
3. "Lowdown Showdown"
4. "The Most Recent (Evolution) of Muthafusticus Modernusticus"
5. "Why You Do Me This Way"
6. "Salsa de Laventille"
7. "The Big Blues"
8. "Highnite"
9. "Southbound with the Hammer Down"
