= Like Never Before =

Studio album by Taj Mahal
- Released: October 1991
- Genre: Blues
- Length: 47:11
- Label: Private Music
- Producer: Skip Drinkwater

Taj Mahal chronology
Mule Bone (1991)	Like Never Before (1991)	Taj's Blues (1992)

Professional ratings
Review scores
Source	Rating
AllMusic	3/5 stars
The Penguin Guide to Blues Recordings	3/4 stars
Rolling Stone	4/5 stars

Like Never Before is an album by the American blues artist Taj Mahal, released in 1991.

== Track listing ==
1. "Don't Call Us" (Richard Feldman, Taj Mahal)
2. "River of Love" (Jimmy Scott, Porter Carroll, Richard Feldman)
3. "Scattered" (Mark T. Jordan, Mark Pearson, Reed Nielson)
4. "Ev'ry Wind (In the River)" (Mark T. Jordan, Patrick Dollaghan, Richard Feldman, Taj Mahal)
5. "Blues with a Feeling" (Walter Jacobs)
6. "Squat That Rabbit" (Joe Nicolo, Taj Mahal)
7. "Take All the Time You Need" (Jerry Williams)
8. "Love Up" (John Martyn)
9. "Cakewalk Into Town" (Taj Mahal)
10. "Big Legged Mommas Are Back in Style" (Taj Mahal)
11. "Take a Giant Step" (Gerry Goffin, Carole King)
