= The Best of the Private Years =

Greatest hits album by Taj Mahal
- Released: April 18, 2000
- Genre: Blues

Taj Mahal chronology
The Best of Taj Mahal (2000)	The Best of the Private Years (2000)	Shoutin' in Key (2000)

Professional ratings
Review scores
Source	Rating
The Penguin Guide to Blues Recordings	2/4 stars

The Best of the Private Years is an album by American blues artist Taj Mahal, which was released in 2000. AllMusic's verdict on the collection was " Mahal has a rich history, and this collection is living proof that a good bluesman gets better with age".

== Track listing ==
1. "Blues Ain't Nothin'"
2. "Here In The Dark"
3. "Mind Your Own Business"
4. "Lovin' In My Baby's Eyes"
5. "Senor Blues"
6. "Ooh Poo Pah Doo" (Jessie Hill)
7. "Hoochi Coochi Coo"
8. "Mr Pitiful"
9. "I Need Your Loving"
10. "I'm Ready"
11. "Sophisticated Mama"
12. "Mockingbird"
13. "That's How Strong My Love Is"
