= Señor Blues (Taj Mahal album) =

Studio album by Taj Mahal
- Released: 1997
- Genres: Blues, rhythm and blues, soul blues, blues jazz
- Length: 51:17
- Label: Private Music
- Producer: John Porter

Taj Mahal chronology
Phantom Blues (1996)	Señor Blues (1997)	Sacred Island (1998)

Professional ratings
Review scores
Source	Rating
AllMusic	4/5 stars
The Encyclopedia of Popular Music	3/5 stars
The Penguin Guide to Blues Recordings	3/4 stars
(The New) Rolling Stone Album Guide	2.5/5 stars

Señor Blues is a 1997 studio album by the blues musician Taj Mahal. It contains a cover of James Brown's "Think". It won the Grammy Award for Best Contemporary Blues Album at the 40th Grammy Awards.

== Track listing ==
1. "Queen Bee" (Taj Mahal)
2. "Think" (Lowman Pauling)
3. "Irresistible You" (Al Kasha, Luther Dixon)
4. "Having a Real Bad Day" (Delbert McClinton, John Barlow Jarvis)
5. "Señor Blues" (Horace Silver)
6. "Sophisticated Mama" (Washboard Sam)
7. "Oh Lord, Things Are Gettin' Crazy Up in Here" (Jon Cleary)
8. "I Miss You Baby" (Freddie Simon)
9. "You Rascal You" (Sam Theard)
10. "Mind Your Own Business" (Hank Williams)
11. "21st Century Gypsy Singing Lover Man" (Taj Mahal, Jon Cleary)
12. "At Last (I Found a Love)" (Marvin Gaye, Anna Gordy Gaye, Elgie Stover)
13. "Mr. Pitiful" (Steve Cropper, Otis Redding)

== Personnel ==
- Taj Mahal – Vocals, harmonica, dobro, kazoo
- Johnny Lee Schell – guitar
- Jon Cleary – piano, Wurlitzer piano
- Mick Weaver – Hammond B-3 organ
- Larry Fulcher – bass
- Tony Braunagel – drums, percussion, tambourine
- Sir Harry Bowens, Donna Taylor, Terrence Forsythe – background vocals
- The Texacalli Horns:

Darrell Leonard – trumpet, trombone, French Horn
Joe Sublett – tenor saxophone
