= The Tumbler =

Studio album by John Martyn
- Released: October 1968
- Recorded: 11 July 1968
- Studio: Regent Sound, Denmark Street, London
- Genre: Folk music Folk rock
- Label: Island
- Producer: Al Stewart

John Martyn chronology
London Conversation (1967)	The Tumbler (1968)	Stormbringer! (1970)

Professional ratings
Review scores
Source	Rating
Allmusic	link
Mojo	3/5 stars

The Tumbler was John Martyn's second album, released on Island Records in 1968. The album shows a progression from his previous solo folk offering to a more expansive sound, including significant contributions from jazz flautist Harold McNair.

== Track listing ==
All tracks composed by John Martyn except where indicated.

1. "Sing a Song of Summer" – 2:22
2. "The River" – 2:59
3. "Goin' Down to Memphis" – 3:12
4. "The Gardeners" (Bill Lyons) – 3:15
5. "A Day at the Sea" – 2:35
6. "Fishin' Blues" (Henry Thomas) – 2:37
7. "Dusty" – 3:07
8. "Hello Train" – 2:36
9. "Winding Boy" (Jelly Roll Morton) – 2:22
10. "Fly on Home" (Martyn, Paul Wheeler) – 2:33
11. "Knuckledy Crunch and Slippledee-slee Song" – 2:55
12. "Seven Black Roses" – 4:02

== Personnel ==
- John Martyn – vocals, guitar, harmonica, keyboards
- Harold McNair – flute on "The River", "Dusty", "The Gardeners" and "Fly On Home"
- David Moses – double bass
- Paul Wheeler – guitar

Technical

- Francine Winham – photography
