= Taj Mahal (album) =

Studio album by Taj Mahal
- Released: February 1968
- Recorded: August 1967
- Genre: Blues rock
- Length: 32:55
- Label: Columbia
- Producers: Bob Irwin, David Rubinson

Taj Mahal chronology
Taj Mahal (1968)	The Natch'l Blues (1968)

Taj Mahal is the debut album by the American guitarist and vocalist Taj Mahal. Recorded in 1967, it contains blues songs by Sleepy John Estes, Robert Johnson, and Sonny Boy Williamson II reworked in contemporary blues- and folk-rock styles. Also included is Taj Mahal's adaptation of Blind Willie McTell's "Statesboro Blues", which inspired the popular Allman Brothers Band recording.

Taj Mahal, who provides the vocals and blues harmonica, is backed by guitarists Jesse Ed Davis and Ry Cooder. Columbia Records released the album in February 1968 to favorable reviews, however, it did not reach the album charts.

== Album cover ==
The Victorian house featured on the cover, known as the Salt Box, was once located on Bunker Hill Avenue in Los Angeles' Bunker Hill neighborhood. Designated a city landmark in 1962, it was one of only two homes that were saved and relocated, only for both to be destroyed by an arson-caused fire in 1969 while awaiting restoration at the future site of the Heritage Square Museum. Bunker Hill Avenue no longer exists and the entire 2-block area around the home's original location is now the site of the Wells Fargo Center.

== Critical reception ==
Professional ratings
Review scores
Source	Rating
AllMusic	5/5 stars
Entertainment Weekly	A
The Penguin Guide to Blues Recordings	3.5/4 stars

Music critic Bruce Eder gave the album five out of five stars. In his review for AllMusic, Eder described it as "as hard and exciting a mix of old and new blues sounds as surfaced on record … in what had to be one of the most quietly, defiantly iconoclastic records of 1968."

In a music review of Taj Mahal reissues for Entertainment Weekly, Tony Scherman gave the album an "A" and wrote that the album "explodes with high spirits; of Taj’s 30-plus albums, it might be the best."

== Track listing ==
Side 1

1. "Leaving Trunk" (Sleepy John Estes) – 4:51
2. "Statesboro Blues" (Blind Willie McTell, arr. Taj Mahal) – 2:59
3. "Checkin' Up on My Baby" (Sonny Boy Williamson II) – 4:55
4. "Everybody's Got to Change Sometime" (Estes) – 2:57

Side 2

1. "EZ Rider" (arr. Taj Mahal) – 3:04
2. "Dust My Broom" (Robert Johnson) – 2:39
3. "Diving Duck Blues" (Estes) – 2:42
4. "The Celebrated Walkin' Blues" (arr. Taj Mahal) – 8:52

== Personnel ==
The personnel listings in the album liner notes are not complete for each track. Taj Mahal provides all of the vocals and harmonica, but the rest of the musicians do not contribute to all tracks.

Musicians

- Taj Mahal – vocals, harmonica, slide guitar
- Jesse Ed Davis – lead guitar, slide guitar
- Ry Cooder – rhythm guitar, mandolin
- Bill Boatman – rhythm guitar
- James Thomas – bass
- Gary Gilmore – bass
- Sanford Konikoff – drums
- Chuck "Brother" Blackwell – drums

Production

- Raphael Valentin, Roy Halee – engineer
- Ron Coro – design
- Guy Webster – photography
