= Henry Thomas (blues musician) =

American country blues singer (1874–1930)

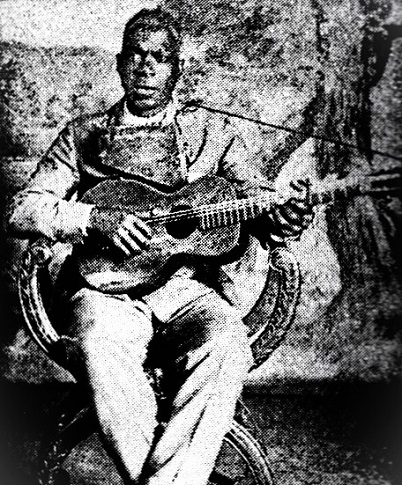
- Vocalion Records promotional photo of Thomas c. 1927

Background information
- Also known as: Ragtime Texas
- Born: 1874; Big Sandy, Texas, U.S.
- Died: 1930 (aged 55–56)
- Genres: Country blues; ragtime; gospel
- Occupations: Singer; songster; musician
- Instruments: Guitar; vocals; quills
- Years active: 1927–29 (recording career)
- Label: Vocalion

Henry Thomas (1874 – 1930) was an American country blues singer, songster and musician. Although his recording career, in the late 1920s, was brief, Thomas influenced performers including Bob Dylan, Taj Mahal, the Lovin' Spoonful, the Grateful Dead, and Canned Heat. Often billed as "Ragtime Texas", Thomas's style is an early example of what later became known as Texas blues guitar.

== Life and career ==
Thomas was born into a family of freed slaves in Big Sandy, Texas, in 1874. He began traveling the Texas railroad lines as a hobo after leaving home in his teens. He eventually earned his way as an itinerant songster, entertaining local populaces as well as railway employees.

He recorded 24 sides for Vocalion Records between 1927 and 1929, 23 of which were released. They include reels, gospel songs, minstrel songs, ragtime numbers, and blues. Besides guitar, Thomas accompanied himself on quills, a folk instrument fabricated from cane reeds whose sound is similar to the zampona played by musicians in Peru and Bolivia. His style of playing guitar was probably derived from banjo-picking styles.

His life and career after his last recordings in 1929 have not been chronicled. Although the blues researcher Mack McCormick stated that he saw a man in Houston in 1949 who met Thomas's description, most biographers indicate that Thomas died in 1930, when he would have been 55 or 56 years old.

== Legacy ==
Thomas's legacy has been sustained by his songs, which were revived by musicians beginning in the folk music revival of the early 1960s. Among the first of these was "Honey, Won't You Allow Me One More Chance", which was reinterpreted by Bob Dylan on the album The Freewheelin' Bob Dylan in 1963 under the title "Honey, Just Allow Me One More Chance". Dylan may have been introduced to Thomas through Harry Smith's 1952 compilation Anthology of American Folk Music, which includes two of Thomas' songs, "Old Country Stomp" and "Fishing Blues". Dylan may have heard Thomas's song on the 1962 album Henry Thomas Sings the Texas Blues. Dylan reworked the melody and almost totally rewrote the lyrics, but he credited Thomas as co-writer on his album Freewheelin'.

Thomas's song "Fishing Blues" was recorded by the folk-rock group the Lovin' Spoonful in 1965, for their hit debut album Do You Believe in Magic. The song was recorded two years later by Jim Kweskin and members of his band, who had been playing it for several years. It was a staple in the early set-lists of the blues musician Taj Mahal and appeared on one of his first albums, De Old Folks at Home, and has since been released on Mahal's compilation albums. John Martyn included the song on his 1968 album The Tumbler. The Nitty Gritty Dirt Band also covered the song on their album Will the Circle Be Unbroken, Volume III in 2002.

"Bull-Doze Blues", another of Thomas's Vocalion recordings, remained an obscure blues number until blues-rock group Canned Heat recorded "Going Up the Country" in 1968. Though rearranged, the Canned Heat song is musically the same, down to a faithful rendition of Thomas's quill solos by Jim Horn. The lyrics also borrow from Blind Willie McTell's "Statesboro Blues" (1928). Fellow band member Alan "Blind Owl" Wilson rewrote the lyrics entirely and received credit on the song's original release in 1968 on Canned Heat's third album, Living the Blues. The next year, the group played at the Woodstock Festival. The live performance of "Going Up the Country" was featured in the motion picture Woodstock and appeared as the second cut on the soundtrack album.

"Don't Ease Me In" was covered by the Grateful Dead on their first single in 1966, and on their album Go to Heaven. Thomas's recording of "Don't Ease Me In" is included on the compilation album The Music Never Stopped: Roots of the Grateful Dead.

Thomas's arrangement of "Cottonfield Blues" was performed by the early Delta blues musicians Garfield Akers and Mississippi Joe Callicott in 1929.

In 1966, the Lovin' Spoonful included an original song entitled "Henry Thomas" on their album, Hums of the Lovin' Spoonful.

In 1987, the band Brendan Croker and The 5 O'Clock Shadows included a song entitled "Henry Thomas (Deceased)" on their album, Boat Trips in the Bay.

In 1993, the band Deacon Blue included a song entitled "Last Night I Dreamed of Henry Thomas" on their album, Whatever You Say, Say Nothing.

In 2018, Charley Crockett dedicated his album, Lonesome as a Shadow, to Thomas.

In 2023, "Bull Doze Blues" was featured in Martin Scorsese's film Killers of the Flower Moon in an early scene where the Osage community are having their pictures taken.

== Recordings ==
Thomas recorded 24 sides for Vocalion Records, 23 of which were released. The following list is ordered by date of release; dates of recording are given after the song titles.

- 1927 – "John Henry" / "Cottonfield Blues", June 30, 1927, in Chicago, Vocalion 1094
- 1927 – "The Fox and the Hounds" / "Red River Blues", October 5, 1927, in Chicago, Vocalion 1137
- 1927 – "The Little Red Caboose" / "Bob McKinney", October 5, 1927, in Chicago, Vocalion 1138
- 1927 – "Shanty Blues" / "Woodhouse Blues", October 7, 1927, in Chicago, Vocalion 1139
- 1927 – "Jonah in the Wilderness" / "When the Train Comes Along", October 7, 1927 in Chicago, Vocalion 1140
- 1927 – "Honey, Won't You Allow Me One More Chance" / "Run, Mollie, Run", October 7, 1927, in Chicago, Vocalion 1141
- 1928 – "Don't Ease Me In" / "Texas Easy Street Blues", June 13, 1928, in Chicago, Vocalion 1197
- 1928 – "Bull-Doze Blues" / "Old Country Stomp", June 13, 1928, in Chicago, Vocalion 1230
- 1928 – "Texas Worried Blues" / "Fishing Blues", June 13, 1928, in Chicago, Vocalion 1249
- 1928 – "Arkansas", July 1, 1927, in Chicago, b/w Georgia Tom and Tampa Red, "Lonesome Man Blues", Vocalion 1286
- 1929 – "Railroadin' Some" / "Don't Leave Me Here", October 7, 1929, in Chicago, Vocalion 1443
- 1929 – "Charmin' Betsy" / "Lovin' Babe", October 7, 1929, in Chicago, Vocalion 1468

== See also ==
- Anthology of American Folk Music
- Origins of the blues
