= Fishing Blues =

1928 single by Henry Thomas

Single by Henry Thomas
- Released: 1928
- Recorded: Chicago, June 13, 1928
- Genre: Texas blues
- Length: 2:44
- Label: Vocalion
- Songwriter: Chris Smith

Henry Thomas singles chronology
"Bull-Doze Blues" / "Old Country Stomp" (1928)	"Fishing Blues" / "Texas Worried Blues" (1928)	"Arkansas" (1928)

"Fishing Blues" (also "Fishin' Blues") is a blues song written in 1911 by Chris Smith, who is best known for "Ballin' the Jack". "Fishing Blues" was first recorded in 1928 by "Ragtime Texas" Henry Thomas on vocals and guitar with the introduction and breaks played on quills, a type of panpipe. It is Roud Folk Song Index No. 17692.

The song ostensibly describes the pleasures of catching, cooking, and eating your own fish, particularly catfish. The refrain includes:

Here's a little somethin' I would like to relate,
Any fish bite, you've got good bait,
I'm a-goin' a-fishin', yes, I'm a-goin' a-fishin',
I'm a-goin' a-fishin' too.

== Recordings ==
- 1928 – Henry Thomas, 10-inch 78 rpm single Vocalion 1249
- 1930s{?) – Sam Chatmon, included on the 1979 album Sam Chatmon's Advice
- 1964 – Mike Seeger, on the album Mike Seeger
- 1965 – The Holy Modal Rounders, on the album The Holy Modal Rounders 2
- 1965 – The Lovin' Spoonful, on the album Do You Believe in Magic
- 1966 – Jim Kweskin and the Jug Band, on the album See Reverse Side for Title
- 1968 – John Martyn, on the album The Tumbler
- 1969 – Taj Mahal, on the album Giant Step/De Ole Folks at Home
- 1975 – Lillebjørn Nilsen, on the album Byen med det store hjertet
- 1977 – Richard Bargel, on the album Blue Steel
- 1984 – John Sebastian, on the 2001 album One Guy, One Guitar
- 1990 – Nappy Brown, on the album Apples and Lemons
- 2000 – Paramount Trio, on the album At the Crossroads of Collingwood and Fitzr
- 2001 – Felonius Blues Revue, on the album Sketches in Blue
- 2001 – David Thomas, on the album The Harry Smith Project: Anthology of American Folk Music Revisited
- 2001 – Claire Tomlinson, on the album Black, White and Blues, Vol. 1
- 2002 – Nitty Gritty Dirt Band, on the album Will the Circle Be Unbroken, Volume III
- 2002 – Teja and Luke, on the album Better Day
- 2003 – Disney, on the soundtrack album Finding Nemo: Ocean Favorites
- 2003 – Doofus, on the album Handful of Songs
- 2003 – Jean-Jacques Milteau, on the album Blue 3rd
- 2003 – Artie Traum, Chris Shaw and Tom Akstens, on the album Big Trout Radio: Songs About Fishing
- 2003 – David Thompson and Ben Winship, on the album Fishing Music
- 2004 – The Juggernauts, on the album As We Like It
- 2006 – Blues Etc., on the album Blues Etc.
- 2006 – Ben Bonham, on the album Kids Only
- 2006 – The Gutbucket Jug Band, on the album Raunchy, Paunchy, Rootless and Blue
- 2006 – Gareth Hedges and Lance Bennett, on the album Candy Man
- 2006 – Hell's Kitchen, on the album City Streets
- 2006 – Peter "Madcat" Ruth, on the album Live in Rio
- 2006 – Someday Baby, on the album Backbone Move
- 2007 – Bill and Kristin Morris, on the album Not Your Regular Cup of Tea
- 2008 – Steve Baker and Dick Bird, on the album King Kazoo
- 2008 – Electric Apricot, on the soundtrack album of the movie Electric Apricot: Quest for Festeroo
- 2009 – Graham Hine, on the album You'll Be Hearing from Me Real Soon
- 2015 – Spuyten Duyvil, on the album The Social Music Hour, Vol. 1
