= Oooh So Good 'n Blues =

Studio album by Taj Mahal
- Released: 1973
- Genre: Blues, acoustic blues
- Label: Columbia
- Producer: Taj Mahal

Taj Mahal chronology
Recycling The Blues & Other Related Stuff (1972)	Oooh So Good 'n Blues (1973)	Mo' Roots (1974)

Professional ratings
Review scores
Source	Rating
AllMusic	3/5 stars
Christgau's Record Guide	A−

Oooh So Good 'n Blues is the sixth studio American blues album by Taj Mahal.

== Track listing ==
1. "Buck Dancer's Choice" (Traditional; arranged by Taj Mahal)
2. "Little Red Hen" (Mahal)
3. "Oh Mama Don't You Know" (Mahal)
4. "Frankie and Albert" (Mississippi John Hurt)
5. "Railroad Bill" (John Work)
6. "Dust My Broom" (Elmore James)
7. "Built for Comfort" (Willie Dixon)
8. "Teacup's Jazzy Blues Tune" (Mahal)

== Personnel ==
- Taj Mahal - rhythm and electric guitar, mandolin, resonator guitar, acoustic bass, piano, blues harp
- Pointer Sisters - vocals on "Little Red Hen", "Frankie and Albert" and "Teacup's Jazzy Blues Tune"
- Raphael Grinage - acoustic bass on "Built For Comfort"
