= Going Home (Taj Mahal album) =

Compilation album by Taj Mahal
- Released: 1980
- Genre: Blues
- Label: Columbia

Taj Mahal chronology
Live & Direct (1979)	Going Home (1980)	Taj (1987)

Going Home is a compilation album by American blues artist Taj Mahal.

== Track listing ==
1. "Statesboro Blues" (Blind Willie McTell)
2. "Dust My Broom" (Elmore James)
3. "You Don't Miss Your Water ('Til You Well Runs Dry)" (William Bell)
4. "Good Morning Miss Brown" (Taj Mahal)
5. "Six Days On The Road" (Earl Green, Carl Montgomery)
6. "Sweet Home Chicago" (Traditional)
7. "Little Red Hen" (Taj Mahal)
8. "Frankie and Albert" (Mississippi John Hurt)
9. "Johnny Too Bad" (The Slickers)
10. "Blackjack Davey" (Taj Mahal)
11. "Satisfied 'N' Tickled Too"
12. "New E-Z Rider Blues"
13. "Brown-Eyed Handsome Man" (Chuck Berry)
14. "Clara (St. Kitts Woman)" (Taj Mahal)
