= The Natch'l Blues =

Studio album by Taj Mahal
- Released: December 23, 1968
- Recorded: May and October 1968
- Genre: Blues
- Length: 36:27
- Label: Columbia
- Producer: David Rubinson

Taj Mahal chronology
Taj Mahal (1968)	The Natch'l Blues (1968)	Giant Step/De Ole Folks at Home (1969)

Professional ratings
Review scores
Source	Rating
AllMusic	5/5 stars
Entertainment Weekly	A−
The Penguin Guide to Blues Recordings	3.5/4 stars
Rolling Stone	(positive)

The Natch'l Blues is the second studio album by American blues artist Taj Mahal, released in 1968.

== Track listing ==
All tracks composed by Taj Mahal, except where indicated:

Side 1

1. "Good Morning Miss Brown" – 3:13
2. "Corinna" (Mahal, Jesse Ed Davis) – 2:59
3. "I Ain't Gonna Let Nobody Steal My Jellyroll" – 3:12
4. "Going Up to the Country, Paint My Mailbox Blue" – 3:34
5. "Done Changed My Way of Living" – 7:02

Side 2

1. "She Caught the Katy and Left Me a Mule to Ride" (Mahal, Yank Rachell) – 3:27
2. "The Cuckoo" (Traditional) – 4:13
3. "You Don't Miss Your Water ('Til Your Well Runs Dry)" (William Bell) – 4:23
4. "Ain't That a Lot of Love" (Homer Banks, Deanie Parker) – 3:59

2000 CD reissue bonus tracks

1. "The Cuckoo" (Alternate Version) – 3:20
2. "New Stranger Blues" – 5:38
3. "Things Are Gonna Work Out Fine" – 3:15

== Personnel ==
- Taj Mahal – vocals, harmonica, Miss "National" resonator guitar
- Jesse Ed Davis – guitar, piano, brass arrangements
- Gary Gilmore – bass
- Chuck "Brother" Blackwell – drums
- Al Kooper – piano
- Earl Palmer – drums
