= Statesboro Blues =

Blues song written by Blind Willie McTell

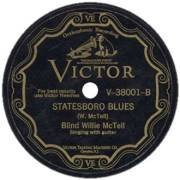

Single by Blind Willie McTell
- A-side: "Three Women Blues"
- Published: June 3, 1929 Southern Music Publishing Co., Inc., New York
- Released: January 1929
- Recorded: October 17, 1928
- Studio: Atlanta, Georgia
- Genre: Piedmont blues
- Length: 2:30
- Label: Victor Victor 38001
- Songwriter: Willie McTell

Official audio
- "Statesboro Blues" (Remastered 2002) on YouTube

"Statesboro Blues" is a Piedmont blues song written by Blind Willie McTell, who recorded it in 1928. The title refers to the town of Statesboro, Georgia. In 1968, Taj Mahal recorded a popular blues rock adaptation of the song with a prominent slide guitar part by Jesse Ed Davis. His rendition inspired a recording by the Allman Brothers Band, which is ranked number nine on Rolling Stone magazine's list of the "100 Greatest Guitar Songs of All Time". In 2005, the Atlanta Journal-Constitution ranked "Statesboro Blues" number 57 on its list of "100 Songs of the South". “Statesboro Blues" was inducted into the Grammy Hall of Fame in 2017.

== Original song ==
Although McTell was born in Thomson, Georgia, in an interview he called Statesboro "my real home." He made the first recording of the song for Victor, on October 17, 1928 (Victor #38001). The eight sides he recorded for Victor, including "Statesboro Blues", have been described as "superb examples of storytelling in music, coupled with dazzling guitar work."

== Lyrics ==
The lyrics, a first-person narrative, appear to relate the story of a man pleading with a woman to let him in her house; the speaker calls himself "Papa McTell" in the first stanza ("Have you got the nerve to drive Papa McTell from your door?"). Throughout the song, the woman, addressed as "mama," is alternately pleaded with (to go with the speaker "up the country") and threatened ("When I leave this time, pretty mama, I'm going away to stay"). Throughout the non-linear narrative, the "Statesboro blues" are invoked—an unexplained condition from which the speaker and his entire family seem to be suffering ("I woke up this morning / Had them Statesboro blues / I looked over in the corner: grandma and grandpa had 'em too"). Later versions, such as the one by the Allman Brothers Band, have shorter, simplified lyrics.

As with many blues lyrics, it can be difficult to establish a definitive narrative order for the stanzas. In the case of "Statesboro Blues," Richard Blaustein attempted a structural analysis of McTell's song in an approach influenced by Claude Lévi-Strauss; it is unclear whether his results are applicable to other blues songs.

In 2016, the song was selected for preservation in the National Recording Registry due to its "cultural, historic, or artistic significance". It is included on several compilations of McTell's recordings.

== Taj Mahal adaptation ==
In 1967, Taj Mahal recorded a "wonderful modernized version" of "Statesboro Blues" for his eponymous 1968 debut album. He had recorded the song earlier as a member of the group Rising Sons in 1965 or 1966; however, it was not released until 1992. His 1967 rendition reached a wide audience by being included on the best-selling Columbia/CBS sampler album The Rock Machine Turns You On. Taj Mahal's arrangement is credited with inspiring the Allman Brothers Band.

According to Pete Carr, who was a member of Hour Glass with brothers Duane and Gregg Allman, a performance by Mahal made a big impression on Duane: "We went to see Taj Mahal, and he had Jesse Ed Davis with him. They did 'Statesboro Blues,' and Davis played slide on it. After hearing that, Duane started practicing slide all the time." Another Hour Glass member, Paul Hornsby, added:

From the first time we saw them [the Taj Mahal band], we picked up 'Statesboro Blues' ... That was the first song that Duane played slide on in the Hour Glass. Of course, now when you think of 'Statesboro Blues,' you think of the Allman Brothers' version, [but] we pretty much did the same arrangement as Taj.

== The Allman Brothers Band version ==
The Allman Brothers Band recorded the song at the Fillmore East in March 1971 and first released it on the 1971 album At Fillmore East. Duane Allman contributes the slide guitar, which Rolling Stone later described as featuring "the moaning and squealing opening licks [that] have given fans chills at live shows."

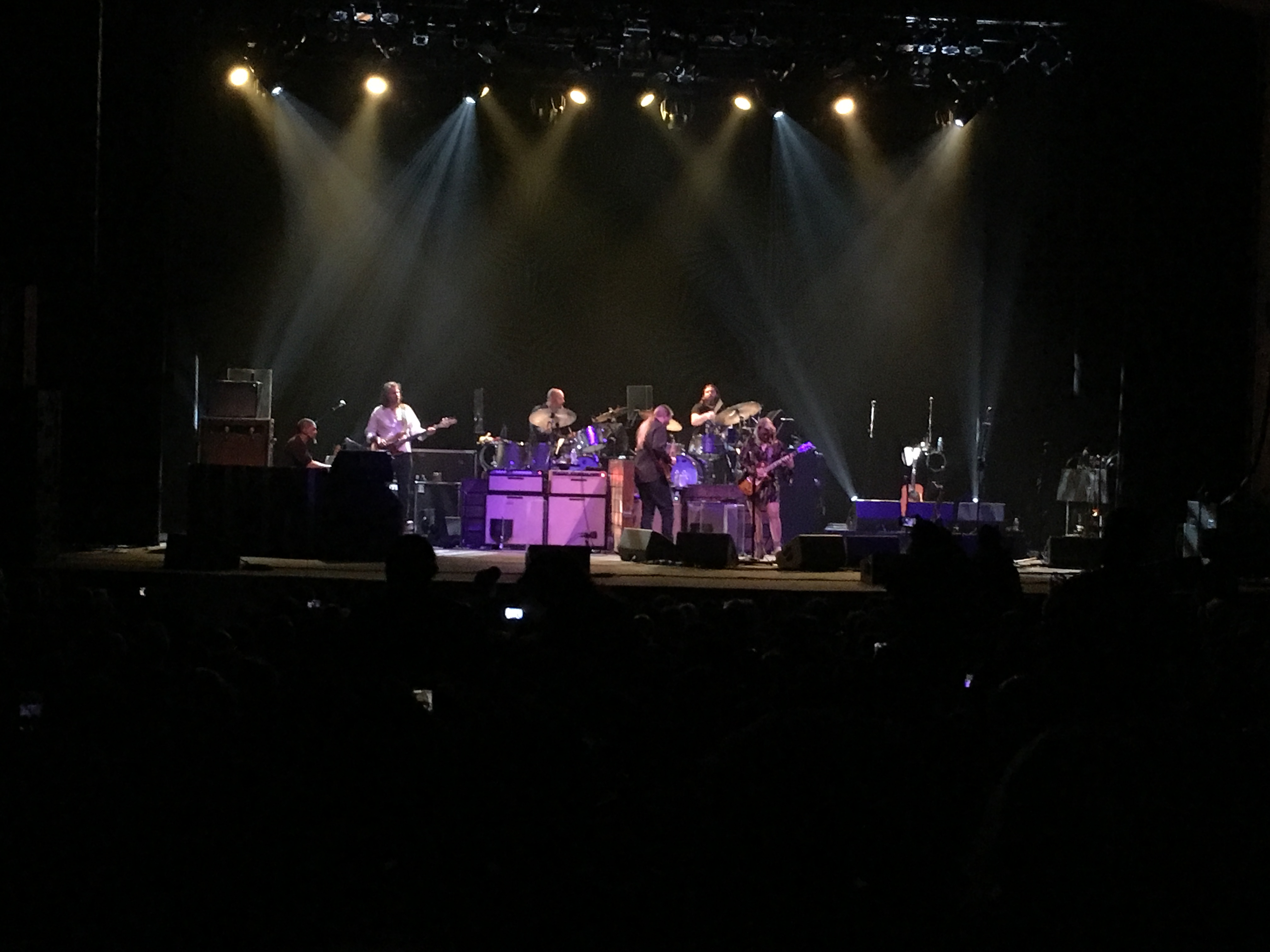
The Tedeschi Trucks Band performing "Statesboro Blues" in tribute fashion in 2018

Allman's slide riffs on "Statesboro Blues" have been analyzed and transcribed in guitar magazines and the tones of Allman's and Dickey Betts's guitars on the song were described by Guitar Player as among the "50 Greatest Tones of All Time." Allman's version comes from when his brother Gregg gave him a record by Taj Mahal (containing his version of "Statesboro Blues") and a bottle of Coricidin pills, both for his birthday and as Duane had a cold that day; a short while later, Duane, who had never played slide guitar before, washed the label from the Coricidin bottle after emptying out the pills and learned how to play the song, even exhibiting it to Gregg. After Allman's death in a motorcycle crash in 1971, the performance from the Fillmore East was included on the 1972 album An Anthology. In 2008, Rolling Stone magazine ranked the Allman Brothers Band's version of "Statesboro Blues" number nine in its list of the "100 Greatest Guitar Songs of All Time".

The song was still a staple of the Allman Brothers Band's live shows in later years, with either Derek Trucks or Warren Haynes playing slide guitar. Dickey Betts also continues to play the song live. It can also be found on the compilation album The Road Goes On Forever. Following the death of his uncle Butch Trucks in 2017, Derek Trucks often led the Tedeschi Trucks Band in tribute performances of "Statesboro Blues", with the band onstage reduced in size to match the original Allmans lineup and Trucks facing the drum position where his uncle had played.
