= Sacred Island =

Studio album by Taj Mahal
- Released: 1998
- Recorded: 1997
- Studios: Messenger Studios, Hawaii
- Genres: Blues, world fusion
- Length: 44:52
- Label: Private Music
- Producer: Carey Williams

Taj Mahal chronology
| Señor Blues (1997) | Sacred Island (1998) | In Progress & In Motion: 1965-1998 (1998) |

Alternative cover

Professional ratings
Review scores
| Source | Rating |
|---|---|
| AllMusic | 3/5 stars |
| Edmonton Journal | 4/5 stars |
| The Encyclopedia of Popular Music | 3/5 stars |
| The Penguin Guide to Blues Recordings | 2.5/4 stars |
| (The New) Rolling Stone Album Guide | 4/5 stars |

Sacred Island is an album by the American blues/world artist Taj Mahal and the Hawaiian music group the Hula Blues Band, released in 1998.

The album peaked at No. 5 on the Billboard Blues Albums chart.

== Production ==
"Coconut Man" is a rewrite of the Toots Hibbert song "Monkey Man"; "Betty and Dupree" is a cover of the Chuck Willis song.

== Critical reception ==
The Edmonton Journal wrote that "the sounds of tenor, baritone, and Liliu ukuleles, Hawaiian steel guitar, pan pipes and slack-key guitars combine with the main man's National dobro and harmonica to create a wonderful musical trip thru the islands." The Dayton Daily News thought that "a gentle Calypso backbeat snakes its way through the project, creating a warm, laid-back, breezy feel." The San Diego Union-Tribune noted "the shock of hearing [the] first song: 'The New Calypsonians' sounds a bit like a gruff-voiced Mose Allison singing reggae at Don Ho's lounge."

== Track listing ==
All tracks composed by Taj Mahal; except where indicated

1. "The Calypsonians"
2. "Coconut Man" (Frederic Hibbert)
3. "Sacred Island (Moku La'a)"
4. "Betty and Dupree" (Chuck Willis)
5. "The New Hula Blues"
6. "No Na Mamo" (Carlos Andrade)
7. "Mailbox Blues"
8. "Kanikapila" (Mahal, Rudy Costa, Kester Smith, Pancho Graham)
