= She Caught the Katy =

1968 blues song by Taj Mahal and James Rachell

"She Caught the Katy (And Left Me a Mule to Ride)" is an upbeat blues written by Taj Mahal and James Rachell. It was first released on Taj Mahal's 1968 album The Natch'l Blues, and it is one of Mahal's most famous compositions.

The song has since become a blues standard and has been covered many times. It was used on the soundtrack for the 1980 movie The Blues Brothers (the song plays over the opening credits as Jake Blues leaves prison). According to Judith Jacklin, John Belushi's widow, it was Belushi's favorite blues song.

The "Katy" refers to the Missouri–Kansas–Texas Railroad.

== See also ==
- List of train songs
