= Taj Mahal (musician) =

American blues musician (born 1942)

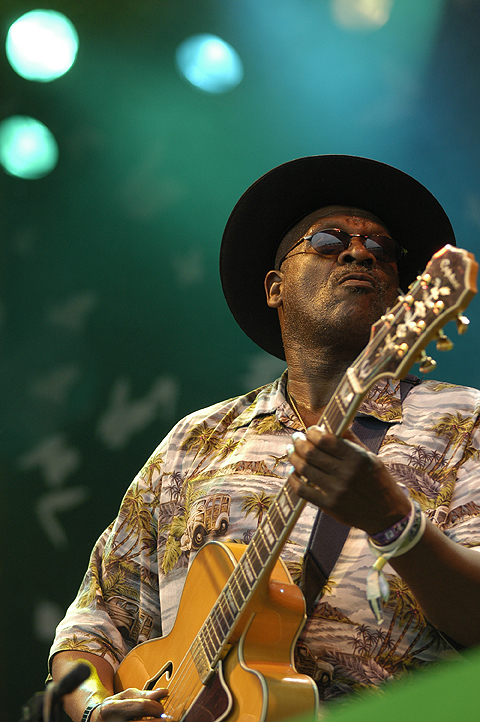
- Mahal in 2005
- Born: Henry St. Claire Fredericks Jr. May 17, 1942 (age 84); Harlem, Manhattan, New York City, U.S.
- Spouses: Anna de Leon; Inshirah Mahal (m. 1976)
- Relatives: Carole Fredericks (sister); Aya de Leon (daughter); Deva Mahal (daughter)
- Musical career
- Genres: Blues; blues rock; R&B; reggae; jazz; country blues; world music
- Occupations: Musician; songwriter
- Instruments: Vocals; guitar; banjo; harmonica; piano; ukulele
- Years active: 1964–present
- Labels: Columbia; Warner Bros.; Gramavision; Hannibal; Ruf; Private Music
- Formerly of: The Rising Sons
- Website: tajblues.com

Henry St. Claire Fredericks Jr. (born May 17, 1942), better known by his stage name Taj Mahal, is an American blues musician. He plays the guitar, piano, banjo, harmonica, and many other instruments along with singing and whistling, often incorporating elements of world music into his work. Mahal has done much to reshape the definition and scope of blues music over the course of his more than 50-year career by fusing it with nontraditional forms, including sounds from the Caribbean, Africa, India, Hawaii, and the South Pacific.

== Early life ==
Mahal was born Henry St. Claire Fredericks Jr. on May 17, 1942, in Harlem, New York. Growing up in Springfield, Massachusetts, he was raised in a musical environment: his mother was a member of a local gospel choir and his father, Henry Saint Claire Fredericks Sr., was an Afro-Caribbean jazz arranger and piano player.

The family owned a shortwave radio which received music broadcasts from around the world, exposing him at an early age to world music. Early in childhood he recognized the stark differences between the popular music of his day and the music that was played in his home. He also became interested in jazz, enjoying the works of musicians such as Charles Mingus, Thelonious Monk and Milt Jackson. His parents came of age during the Harlem Renaissance, instilling in their son a sense of pride in his Caribbean and African ancestry through their stories.

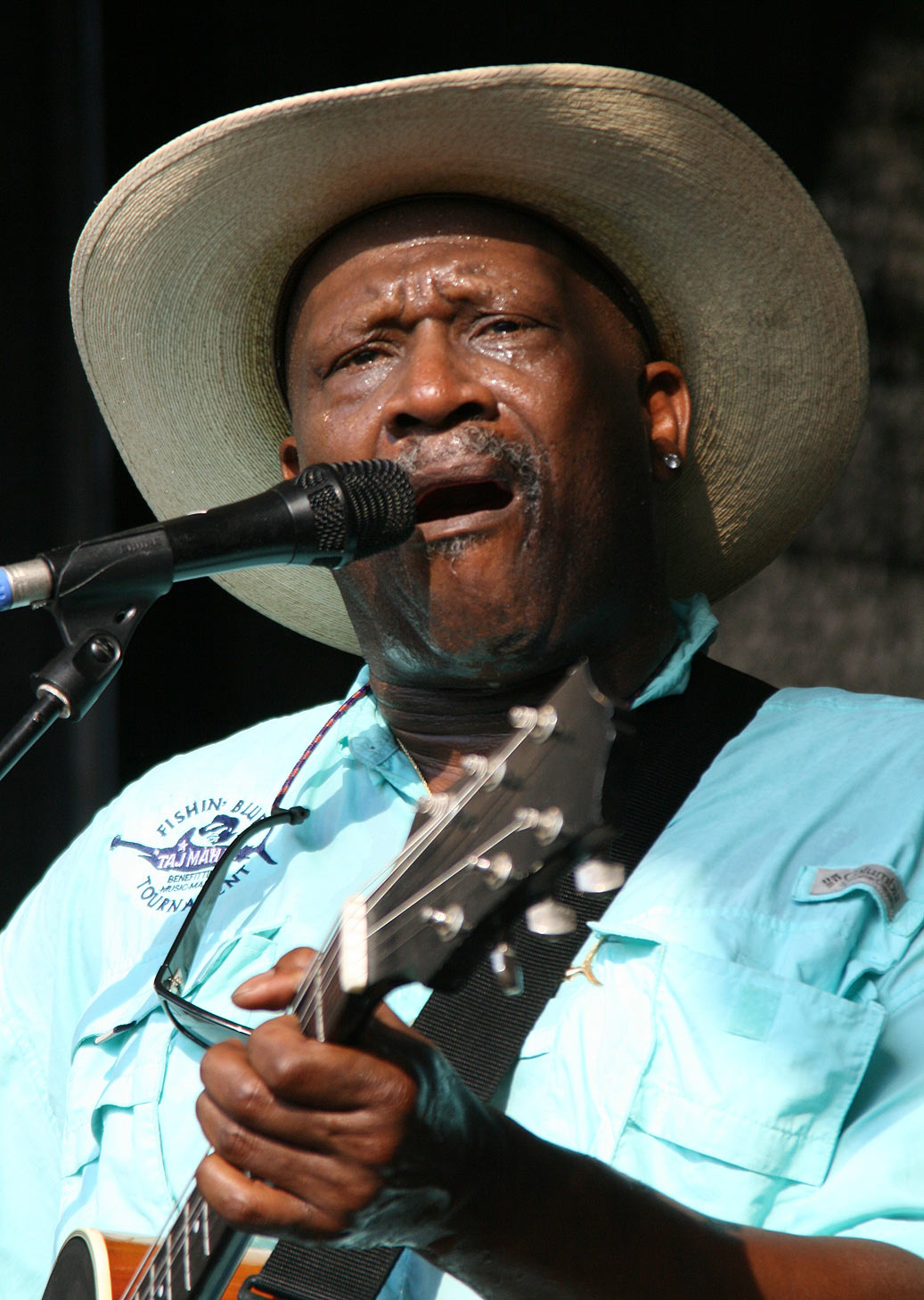
Mahal at the Museumsquartier in Vienna (Jazz-Fest Wien), 2007

Because his father was a musician, his home frequently hosted other musicians from the Caribbean, Africa, and the US. His father was called "The Genius" by Ella Fitzgerald before starting his family. Early on, Henry Jr. developed an interest in African music, which he studied assiduously as a young man. His parents encouraged him to pursue music, starting him out with classical piano lessons. He also studied the clarinet, trombone and harmonica.

When Henry Jr. was eleven years old, his father was killed in an accident at his construction company, crushed by a tractor when it flipped. It was an extremely traumatic experience for the boy. Henry Jr's mother remarried, and his stepfather owned a guitar which he began using at the age of 13 or 14. His first lessons were from a new neighbor from North Carolina of his own age who played acoustic blues guitar. This neighbor, Lynwood Perry, was the nephew of the famous bluesman Arthur "Big Boy" Crudup. In high school Henry Jr. sang in a doo-wop group.

For some time, Henry thought of pursuing farming over music. His passion began on a dairy farm in Palmer, Massachusetts, not far from Springfield, at the age of 16. By the time he was 19, he had become farm foreman. "I milked anywhere between thirty-five and seventy cows a day. I clipped udders. I grew corn. I grew Tennessee redtop clover. Alfalfa." Mahal believes in growing one's own food, saying, "You have a whole generation of kids who think everything comes out of a box and a can, and they don't know you can grow most of your food." Because of his personal support of the family farm, Mahal regularly performs at Farm Aid concerts.

Henry chose his stage name, Taj Mahal, from dreams he had about Mahatma Gandhi, India, and social tolerance. Henry started using the stage name in 1959 or 1961—around the same time he began attending the University of Massachusetts. Despite having attended a vocational agriculture school, becoming a member of the National FFA Organization, and majoring in animal husbandry and minoring in veterinary science and agronomy, Mahal decided to pursue music instead of farming. In college, he led a rhythm and blues band called Taj Mahal & The Elektras. Before heading for the US West Coast, he was also part of a duo with Jessie Lee Kincaid.

== Career ==
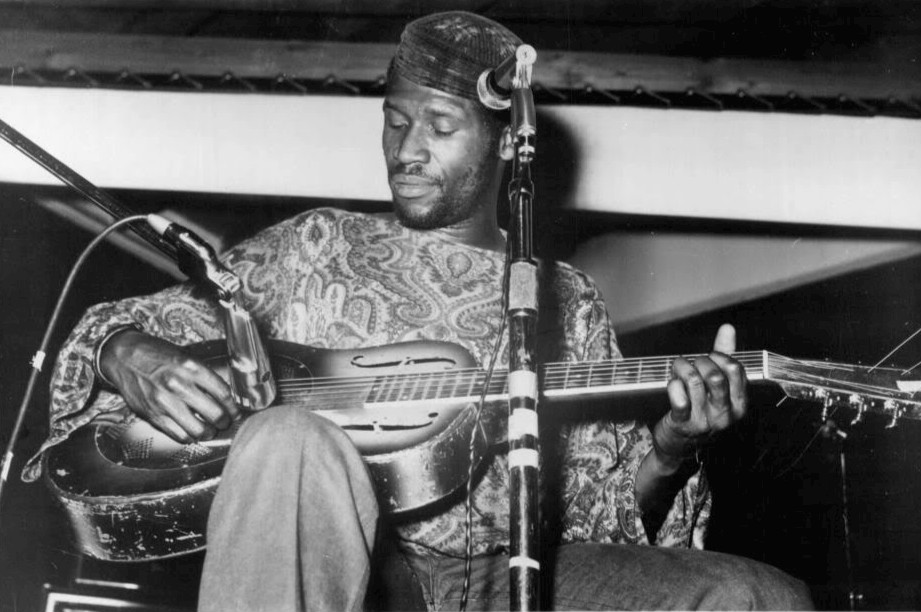
Taj Mahal performing in 1971 (Millard Agency photo)

Mahal moved to Santa Monica, California, in 1964 and formed Rising Sons with fellow blues rock musicians Ry Cooder, Jessie Lee Kincaid and future Byrds drummer Kevin Kelley, landing a record deal with Columbia Records soon after. After the Rising Sons disbanded, Jesse Ed Davis, a Kiowa native from Oklahoma, joined Taj Mahal and played guitar and piano on Mahal's first four albums. The group was one of the first interracial bands of the period, which may have hampered their commercial viability. However, Rising Sons bassist Gary Marker later recalled the band's members had come to a creative impasse and were unable to reconcile their musical and personal differences even with the guidance of veteran producer Terry Melcher. They recorded enough songs for a full-length album, but released only a single and the band soon broke up. However, Jesse Ed Davis would continue playing with Taj in his live bands into the early 70s. Legacy Records did release The Rising Sons Featuring Taj Mahal and Ry Cooder in 1992 with material from that period. During this time Mahal was also working with other musicians like Howlin' Wolf, Buddy Guy, Lightnin' Hopkins, and Muddy Waters.

Mahal stayed with Columbia for his solo career, releasing the self-titled Taj Mahal and The Natch'l Blues in 1968. His track "Statesboro Blues" was featured on side 2 of the very successful Columbia/CBS sampler album, The Rock Machine Turns You On, giving a huge early impetus to his career. Giant Step/De Old Folks at Home with session musician Jesse Ed Davis followed in 1969. During this time he and Cooder worked with the Rolling Stones, with whom he has performed at various times throughout his career. In 1968, he performed in the film The Rolling Stones Rock and Roll Circus. In 1969, he performed at the Gold Rush rock music festival in Amador County.

Mahal recorded a total of twelve albums for Columbia from the late 1960s into the 1970s. His work of the 1970s was especially important, in that his releases began incorporating West Indian and Caribbean music, jazz and reggae into the mix. In 1972, he acted in and wrote the film score for the movie Sounder, which starred Cicely Tyson. He reprised his role and returned as composer in the sequel, Part 2, Sounder.

In 1976 Mahal left Columbia and signed with Warner Bros. Records, recording three albums for them. One of these was another film score for 1977's Brothers; the album shares the same name. After his time with Warner Bros., he struggled to find another record contract, this being the era of heavy metal and disco music.

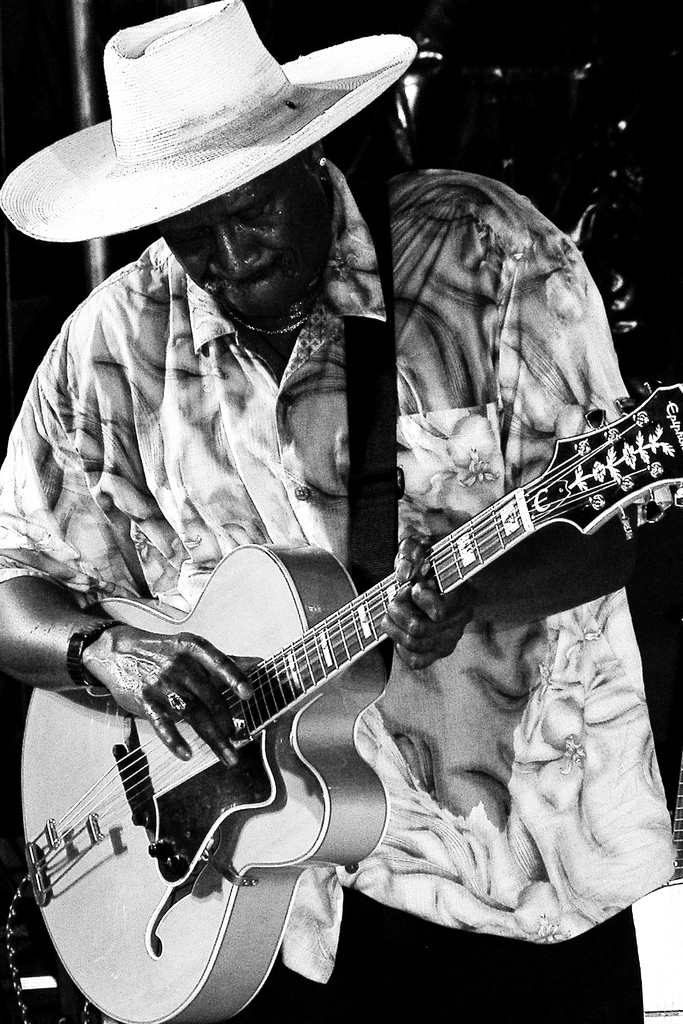
Taj Mahal at the Liri Blues Festival, Italy, in 2005

Stalled in his career, he decided to move to Kauaʻi, Hawaii in 1981 and soon formed the Hula Blues Band. Originally just a group of guys getting together for fishing and a good time, the band soon began performing regularly and touring. He maintained a low public profile in Hawaii throughout most of the 1980s before recording Taj in 1988 for Gramavision. This started a comeback of sorts for him, recording both for Gramavision and Hannibal Records during this time.

In the 1990s, Mahal became deeply involved in supporting the nonprofit Music Maker Relief Foundation. As of 2019, he was still on the Foundation's advisory board.

In the 1990s, he was on the Private Music label, releasing albums full of blues, pop, R&B and rock. He did collaborative works both with Eric Clapton and Etta James.

In 1995, he recorded a record fusing traditional American blues with Indian stringed instruments, Mumtaz Mahal, accompanied by Vishwa Mohan Bhatt on Mohan veena and N. Ravikiran on chitravina, a fretless lute.

In 1996, he appeared in the documentary film Blind Willie's Blues discussing blues legend Blind Willie McTell, who along with other songs, wrote the original "Statesboro Blues".

In 1998, in collaboration with renowned songwriter David Forman, producer Rick Chertoff and musicians Cyndi Lauper, Willie Nile, Joan Osborne, Rob Hyman, Garth Hudson and Levon Helm of the Band, and the Chieftains, he performed on the Americana album Largo based on the music of Antonín Dvořák.

In 1997, he won Best Contemporary Blues Album for Señor Blues at the Grammy Awards, followed by another Grammy for Shoutin' in Key in 2000. He performed the theme song to the children's television show Peep and the Big Wide World, which began broadcast in 2004.

In the late 1990s or early 2000s, Mahal moved to Berkeley, California, where he still lives today.

In 2002, Mahal appeared on the Red Hot Organization's compilation album Red Hot and Riot in tribute to Nigerian afrobeat musician Fela Kuti. The Paul Heck produced album was widely acclaimed, and all proceeds from the record were donated to AIDS charities.

Taj Mahal contributed to Olmecha Supreme's 2006 album hedfoneresonance. The Wellington-based group led by Mahal's son Imon Starr (Ahmen Mahal) also featured Deva Mahal on vocals.

Mahal partnered up with Keb' Mo' to release a joint album TajMo on May 5, 2017. The album has some guest appearances by Bonnie Raitt, Joe Walsh, Sheila E., and Lizz Wright, and has six original compositions and five covers, from artists and bands like John Mayer and The Who.

In 2013, Mahal appeared in the documentary film on Byrds founding member Gene Clark, 'The Byrd Who Flew Alone', produced by Four Suns Productions. Clark and Mahal had been friends for many years.

In June 2017, Mahal appeared in the award-winning documentary film The American Epic Sessions, directed by Bernard MacMahon, recording Charley Patton's "High Water Everywhere" on the first electrical sound recording system from the 1920s. Mahal appeared throughout the accompanying documentary series American Epic, commenting on the 1920s rural recording artists who had a profound influence on American music and on him personally.

== Personal life ==
Mahal's first marriage was to Anna de Leon. He refers to Anna in the song "Texas Woman Blues" with the spoken words "Señorita de Leon, escucha mi canción". That marriage produced one daughter, the novelist and professor Aya de Leon. Taj Mahal married Inshirah Geter on January 23, 1976, and together they have six children. His daughter Deva Mahal appeared on one episode of Dating Around.

== Musical style ==
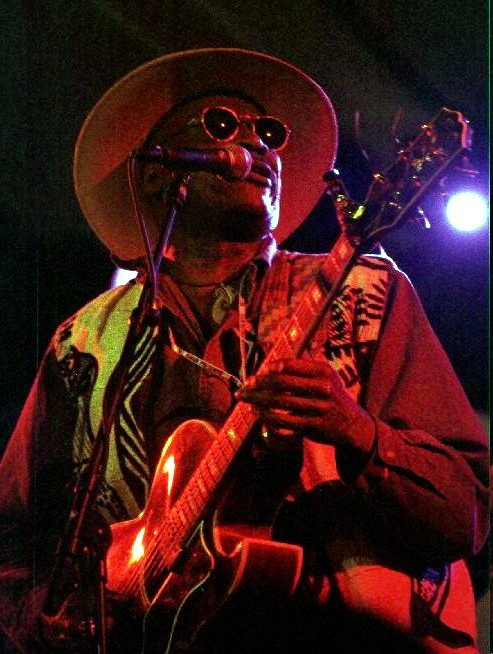
Taj Mahal performing at the 1997 North Sea Jazz Festival

Mahal leads with his thumb and middle finger when fingerpicking, rather than with his index finger as the majority of guitar players do. "I play with a flatpick," he says, "when I do a lot of blues leads." Early in his musical career Mahal studied the various styles of his favorite blues singers, including musicians like Jimmy Reed, Son House, Sleepy John Estes, Big Mama Thornton, Howlin' Wolf, Mississippi John Hurt, and Sonny Terry. He describes his hanging out at clubs like Club 47 in Massachusetts and Ash Grove in Los Angeles as "basic building blocks in the development of his music." Considered to be a scholar of blues music, his studies of ethnomusicology at the University of Massachusetts Amherst would come to introduce him further to the folk music of the Caribbean and West Africa. Over time he incorporated more and more African roots music into his musical palette, embracing elements of reggae, calypso, jazz, zydeco, R&B, gospel music, and the country blues—each of which having "served as the foundation of his unique sound." According to The Rough Guide to Rock, "It has been said that Taj Mahal was one of the first major artists, if not the first, to pursue the possibilities of world music. Even the blues he was playing in the early 70s – Recycling The Blues & Other Related Stuff (1972), Mo' Roots (1974) – showed an aptitude for spicing the mix with flavours that always kept him a yard or so distant from being an out-and-out blues performer." Concerning his voice, author David Evans writes that Mahal has "an extraordinary voice that ranges from gruff and gritty to smooth and sultry."

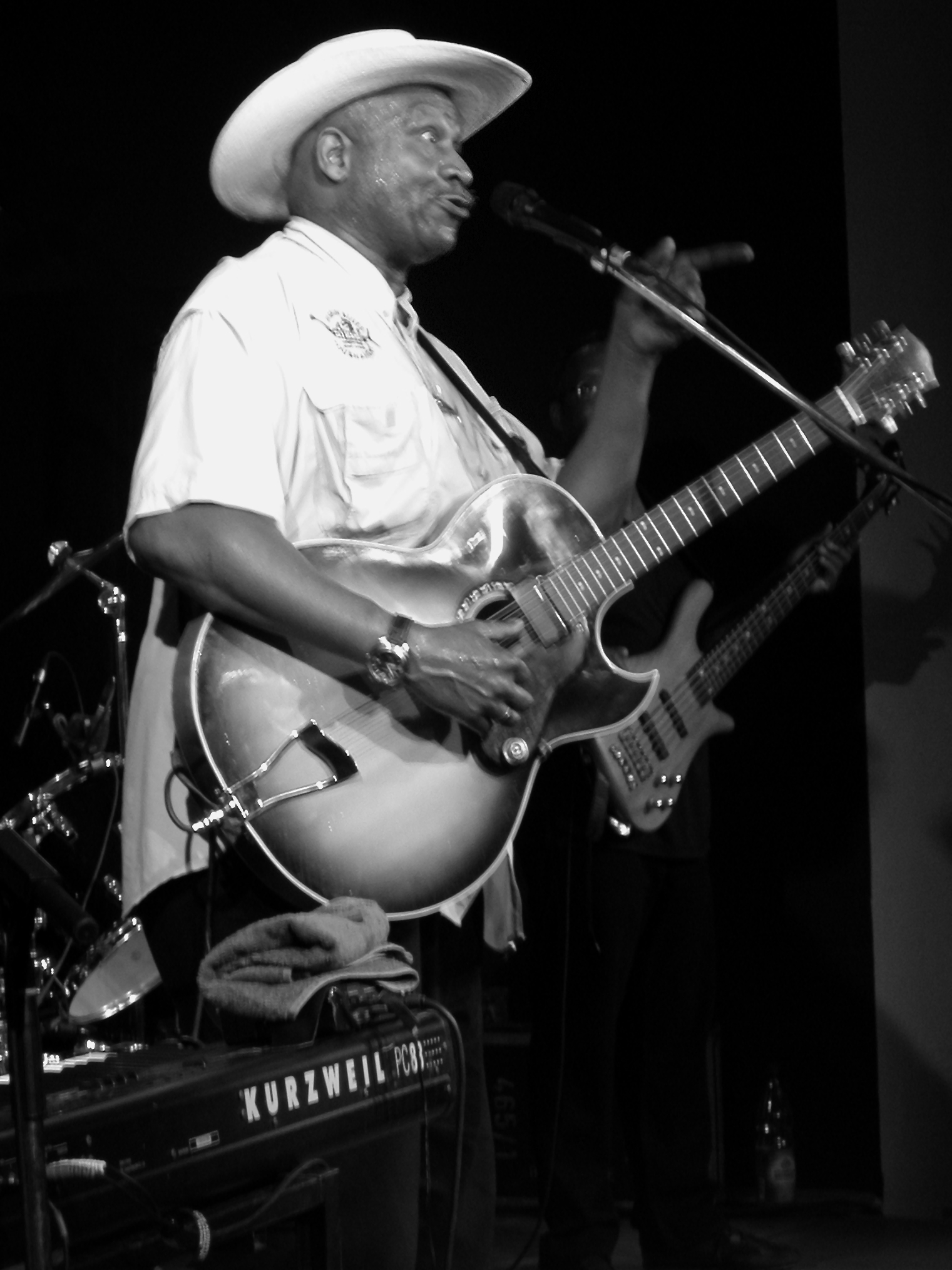
Taj Mahal in Niederstetten, Germany, June 2007

Taj Mahal believes that his 1999 album Kulanjan, which features him playing with the kora master of Mali's Griot tradition Toumani Diabaté, "embodies his musical and cultural spirit arriving full circle." To him it was an experience that allowed him to reconnect with his African heritage, striking him with a sense of coming home. He even changed his name to Dadi Kouyate, the first jali name, to drive this point home. Speaking of the experience and demonstrating the breadth of his eclecticism, he has said:

The microphones are listening in on a conversation between a 350-year-old orphan and its long-lost birth parents. I've got so much other music to play. But the point is that after recording with these Africans, basically if I don't play guitar for the rest of my life, that's fine with me....With Kulanjan, I think that Afro-Americans have the opportunity to not only see the instruments and the musicians, but they also see more about their culture and recognize the faces, the walks, the hands, the voices, and the sounds that are not the blues. Afro-American audiences had their eyes really opened for the first time. This was exciting for them to make this connection and pay a little more attention to this music than before.

Taj Mahal has said he prefers to do outdoor performances, saying: "The music was designed for people to move, and it's a bit difficult after a while to have people sitting like they're watching television. That's why I like to play outdoor festivals-because people will just dance. Theatre audiences need to ask themselves: 'What the hell is going on? We're asking these musicians to come and perform and then we sit there and draw all the energy out of the air.' That's why after a while I need a rest. It's too much of a drain. Often I don't allow that. I just play to the goddess of music-and I know she's dancing."

Mahal has been quoted as saying, "Eighty-one percent of the kids listening to rap were not black kids. Once there was a tremendous amount of money involved in it ... they totally moved it over to a material side. It just went off to a terrible direction. ...You can listen to my music from front to back, and you don't ever hear me moaning and crying about how bad you done treated me. I think that style of blues and that type of tone was something that happened as a result of many white people feeling very, very guilty about what went down."

== Awards ==
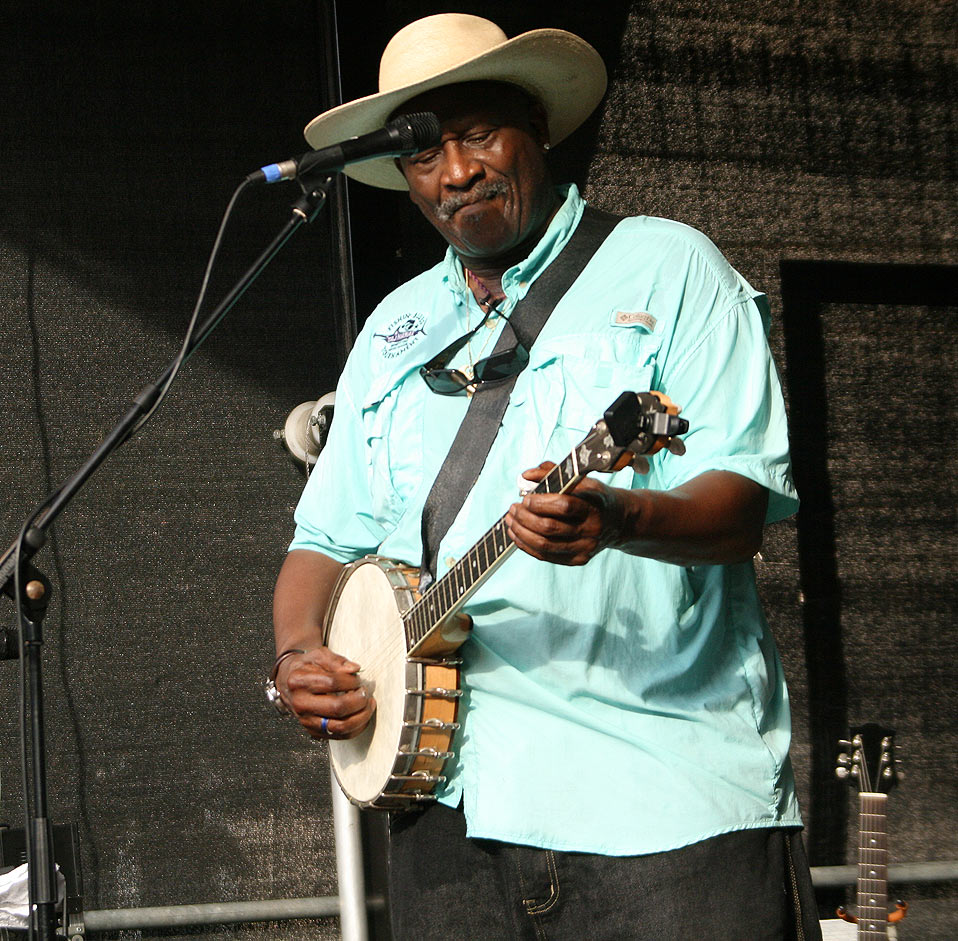
Taj Mahal on banjo at the Jazz-Fest, Wien, Austria in 2007

Taj Mahal has received five Grammy Awards (seventeen nominations) over his career.

- 1997 (Grammy Award) Best Contemporary Blues Album for Señor Blues
- 2000 (Grammy Award) Best Contemporary Blues Album for Shoutin' in Key
- 2006 (Blues Music Awards) Historical Album of the Year for The Essential Taj Mahal
- 2008 (Grammy Nomination) Best Contemporary Blues Album for Maestro
- 2018 (Grammy Award) Best Contemporary Blues Album for TajMo
- 2022 (Grammy Award) Best Traditional Blues Album for Get on Board
- 2025 (Grammy Award) Best Traditional Blues Album for Swingin' Live at the Church in Tulsa

On February 8, 2006, Taj Mahal was designated the official Blues Artist of the Commonwealth of Massachusetts.

In March 2006, Taj Mahal, along with his sister, the late Carole Fredericks, received the Foreign Language Advocacy Award from the Northeast Conference on the Teaching of Foreign Languages in recognition of their commitment to shine a spotlight on the vast potential of music to foster genuine intercultural communication.

On May 22, 2011, Taj Mahal received an honorary Doctor of Humanities degree from Wofford College in Spartanburg, South Carolina. He also made brief remarks and performed three songs. A video of the performance can be found online.

In 2014, Taj Mahal received the Americana Music Association's Lifetime Achievement award.

The Recording Academy named Taj Mahal a 2025 Lifetime Achievement Award honoree, for creative contributions of outstanding artistic significance to the field of recording.

== Discography ==
=== Albums ===
- 1968 – Taj Mahal
- 1968 – The Natch'l Blues
- 1969 – Giant Step/De Ole Folks at Home
- 1971 – Happy Just to Be Like I Am
- 1972 – Recycling The Blues & Other Related Stuff
- 1972 – Sounder (original soundtrack)
- 1973 – Oooh So Good 'n Blues
- 1974 – Mo' Roots
- 1975 – Music Keeps Me Together
- 1976 – Satisfied 'n' Tickled Too
- 1976 – Music Fuh Ya' (Musica Para Tu)
- 1977 – Brothers
- 1977 – Evolution (The Most Recent)
- 1987 – Taj
- 1988 – Shake Sugaree – Taj Mahal Sings and Plays for Children
- 1991 – Mule Bone
- 1991 – Like Never Before
- 1993 – Dancing the Blues
- 1995 – Mumtaz Mahal (with V.M. Bhatt and N. Ravikiran)
- 1996 – Phantom Blues
- 1997 – Señor Blues
- 1997 – Taj Mahal and the Hula Blues AKA Sacred Island (1998; with The Hula Blues Band)
- 1999 – Kulanjan (with Toumani Diabaté)
- 2001 – Hanapepe Dream (with The Hula Blues Band)
- 2005 – Mkutano Meets the Culture Musical Club of Zanzibar
- 2008 – Maestro
- 2012 – Hidden Treasures of Taj Mahal CD1 unreleased 1969–1973
- 2014 – Talkin' Christmas (with The Blind Boys of Alabama)
- 2016 – Labor of Love (recorded in 1998)
- 2017 – TajMo (with Keb' Mo')
- 2023 – Savoy
- 2025 – Room on the Porch (with Keb' Mo')
- 2026 – Time

=== Live albums ===
- 1971 – The Real Thing
- 1972 – Recycling The Blues & Other Related Stuff
- 1972 – Big Sur Festival – One Hand Clapping
- 1979 – Taj Mahal and The International Rhythm Band – Live & Direct
- 1990 – Live at Ronnie Scott's AKA Big Blues
- 1994 – An Evening of Acoustic Music
- 2000 – Taj Mahal and The Phantom Blues Band Live – Shoutin' in Key
- 2004 – Taj Mahal Trio – Live Catch
- 2007 – World Blues (recorded in 1971; reissue with additional material on a 2019 LP)
- 2012 – Hidden Treasures of Taj Mahal CD2 Live at the Royal Albert Hall 1970
- 2015 – Taj Mahal & The Hula Blues Band: Live From Kauaʻi
- 2016 – Live in San Francisco 1966
- 2020 – Taj Mahal Live – Live American Radio Broadcast AKA Johnny Too Bad – Live American Radio Broadcast AKA Taj Mahal – Ultrasonic Blues – The Full WLIR New York Broadcast 1974 AKA Live at Ultrasonic Studios
- 2020 – The Underground Pipeline – Gainesville, FL Broadcast 1978
- 2024 – Swingin' Live at the Church in Tulsa

=== Compilation albums ===
- 1980 – Going Home
- 1981 – The Best of Taj Mahal, Volume 1 (Columbia)
- 1992 – Taj's Blues
- 1993 – World Music
- 1994 – Taj Mahal – The Rising Sun collection No. 3 (reissued in 2004 as Sugar Mama Blues)
- 1998 – In Progress & In Motion: 1965-1998
- 1999 – Blue Light Boogie
- 2000 – The Best of Taj Mahal
- 2000 – The Best of the Private Years
- 2001 – Sing a Happy Song: The Warner Bros. Recordings
- 2003 – Martin Scorsese Presents the Blues – Taj Mahal
- 2003 – Blues with a Feeling: The Very Best of Taj Mahal
- 2005 – The Essential Taj Mahal
- 2014 – Sweet Mama Red
- 2019 – Taj Mahal – Ten songs for you

=== Various artists featuring Taj Mahal ===
- 1968 – The Rolling Stones Rock and Roll Circus
- 1968 – The Rock Machine Turns You On
- 1970 – Fill Your Head With Rock
- 1985 – Conjure: Music for the Texts of Ishmael Reed
- 1990 – The Hot Spot – original soundtrack
- 1991 – Vol Pour Sidney – one title only, other tracks by Charlie Watts, Elvin Jones, Pepsi, The Lonely Bears, Lee Konitz and others.
- 1992 – Rising Sons featuring Taj Mahal and Ry Cooder
- 1992 – Smilin' Island of Song by Cedella Marley Booker and Taj Mahal.
- 1993 – The Source by Ali Farka Touré (World Circuit WCD030; Hannibal 1375)
- 1993 – Peace Is the World Smiling
- 1997 – Follow the Drinking Gourd
- 1997 – Shakin' a Tailfeather
- 1997 – Right Now! by Howard Johnson
- 1998 – Scrapple – original soundtrack
- 1998 – Largo
- 1999 – Hippity Hop
- 2001 – "Strut" – with Jimmy Smith on his album Dot Com Blues
- 2002 – Jools Holland's Big Band Rhythm & Blues (Rhino) – contributing his version of "Outskirts of Town"
- 2002 – Will The Circle Be Unbroken, Volume III – Lead vocals on Fishin' Blues, and lead in and first verse of the title track, with Nitty Gritty Dirt Band, Alison Krauss, Doc Watson
- 2004 – Musicmakers with Taj Mahal (Music Maker 49)
- 2004 – Etta Baker with Taj Mahal (Music Maker 50)
- 2007 – Goin' Home: A Tribute to Fats Domino (Vanguard) – contributing his version of "My Girl Josephine"
- 2007 – Le Cœur d'un homme by Johnny Hallyday – duet on "T'Aimer si mal", written by French best-selling novelist Marc Levy
- 2009 – American Horizon – with Los Cenzontles, David Hidalgo
- 2011 – Play The Blues Live From Lincoln Jazz Center – with Wynton Marsalis and Eric Clapton, playing on "Just a Closer Walk With Thee" and "Corrine, Corrina"
- 2013 – "Poye 2" – with Bassekou Kouyate and Ngoni Ba on their album Jama Ko
- 2013 – "Winding Down" – with Sammy Hagar, Dave Zirbel, John Cuniberti, Mona Gnader, Vic Johnson on the album Sammy Hagar & Friends
- 2013 – Divided & United: The Songs of the Civil War – with a version of "Down by the Riverside"
- 2015 – "How Can a Poor Boy?" – with Van Morrison on his album Re-working the Catalogue
- 2017 – Music from The American Epic Sessions: Original Motion Picture Soundtrack – contributing his version of "High Water Everywhere"
- 2022 – Get on Board – with Ry Cooder
- 2026 – Faye Sings The Blues – with Faye Carol

== Filmography ==
Live DVDs

- 2002 – Live at Ronnie Scott's 1988
- 2006 – Taj Mahal/Phantom Blues Band Live at St. Lucia
- 2011 – Play The Blues Live From Lincoln Jazz Center – with Wynton Marsalis and Eric Clapton, playing on "Just a Closer Walk With Thee" and "Corrine, Corrina"

Movies

- 1967 - Festival as himself
- 1972 – Sounder as Ike Phillips
- 1976 – Part 2, Sounder as Ike Phillips
- 1977 – Scott Joplin as Poor Alfred
- 1977 – Brothers (composer)
- 1987 – The Man Who Broke 1,000 Chains as Bones
- 1991 – Bill & Ted's Bogus Journey as Gatekeeper
- 1992 – Zebrahead (composer)
- 1995 – Once Upon a Time... When We Were Colored as Mr. Will
- 1996 – Blind Willie's Blues (documentary film) Featured Interview
- 1996 – The Rolling Stones Rock and Roll Circus as himself
- 1998 – Outside Ozona as Dix Mayal
- 1998 – Six Days, Seven Nights as Entertainer
- 2000 – Songcatcher as Dexter Speaks
- 2002 – Divine Secrets of the Ya-Ya Sisterhood as Swing Band Singer
- 2004 – Killer Diller as J.R. Cox
- 2017 – American Epic as himself

TV shows

- 1977 – Saturday Night Live – Episode 048 Performer: Musical Guest
- 1985 – Theme song from Star Wars: Ewoks
- 1989 – Night Music – Musical Guest with Todd Rundgren
- 1992 – New WKRP in Cincinnati – Moss Dies as himself
- 1995 – The Mask: Animated Series – Additional voices
- 1996 – Aaahh!!! Real Monsters – Monster Blues as Ellis Robinson
- 1999 – Party of Five – Fillmore Street as himself
- 2003 – Arthur – Big Horns George as himself (voice)
- 2004 – Theme song from Peep and the Big Wide World
