= Jesse Ed Davis =

Native American guitarist from Oklahoma, U.S. (1944–1988)

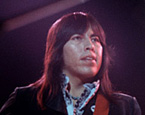
- Davis at the Concert for Bangladesh in 1971

Background information
- Born: Jesse Edwin Davis III; September 21, 1944; Norman, Oklahoma, U.S.
- Died: June 22, 1988 (aged 43) Los Angeles, California, U.S.
- Genres: Rock; blues
- Occupation: Musician
- Instrument: Guitar
- Years active: 1950s–1988
- Formerly of: Plastic Ono Band
- Spouses: Tantalayo Saenz; Kelly Brady

Jesse Edwin Davis III (September 21, 1944 – June 22, 1988) was a Native American guitarist. He was well regarded as a session artist and solo performer, was a member of Taj Mahal's backing band and played with musicians such as Bob Dylan, Eric Clapton, John Lennon, George Harrison, and Jackson Browne.

In 2018, Davis was posthumously inducted into the Native American Music Hall of Fame at the 18th Annual Native American Music Awards. Davis was an enrolled citizen of the Kiowa Indian Tribe of Oklahoma with Comanche, Muscogee, and Seminole ancestry.

== Early life and education ==
Davis was born in Norman, Oklahoma. His father, Jesse Edwin "Bus" Davis II, was a citizen of the Comanche Nation and a Muscogee and Seminole descendant. His father was also a prominent Native American artist whose nome d'arte was Asawoya or Running Wolf. His mother, Vivian Mae (Bea) Saunkeah, was Kiowa.

Davis began his musical career in the late 1950s in Oklahoma City and surrounding cities with John Ware (later a drummer for Emmylou Harris and Michael Nesmith during the First National Band era); John Selk (later a bass player for Donovan) late 1950s; Jerry Fisher (later a vocalist with Blood, Sweat & Tears); and drummer Bill Maxwell (later with Andrae Crouch).

Davis graduated from Northeast High School in 1962 and graduated with a degree in English literature from the University of Oklahoma. Even into his later years, it was remembered that he enjoyed quoting Socrates and Plato. By the mid-1960s, he left college to tour with Conway Twitty.

== Career ==
Davis eventually moved to California. For eight years, he lived in Marina del Rey with his companion, Patti Daley, and her son, Billy. Through his friendship with Levon Helm, he became friends with Leon Russell, who introduced him to recording session work.

Davis joined Taj Mahal and played guitar and piano on Mahal's first four albums. He played slide, lead and rhythm, country and even jazz during his three-year stint with Mahal. In a 1967 gig, Mahal played with a young Duane Allman in attendance, and Davis' slide guitar playing on Statesboro Blues that night would ignite Allman's interest in the technique. Mahal and his band were later invited to England by the Rolling Stones, and they appeared as a musical guest in The Rolling Stones Rock and Roll Circus.

He played in the "electric" disc of Mahal's double album Giant Step/De Ole Folks at Home (1969) and appeared in two songs of his fourth album Happy Just to Be Like I Am (1971).

In 1970, Davis played on and produced Roger Tillison's only album for Atco Records, a division of Atlantic. Davis and Tillison − both Oklahoman − were joined at the Record Plant by Bobby Bruce (fiddle), Larry Knechtel (organ and harmonica), Stan Szelest (piano); Billy Rich (bass); Jim Keltner (from Oklahoma, drums) and Sandy Konikoff (percussion); Don Preston and Joey Cooper were vocal accompanists. Roger Tillison's Album was recorded live. It was finally released on CD by Wounded Bird Records in 2008, with Davis playing electric guitar, bottleneck (slide) guitar and banjo.

In 1971, Davis recorded his first solo album after Atco Records signed a contract with him to record two albums with the label. The first was the album ¡Jesse Davis! (1971), which featured backing vocals by Gram Parsons and performances by Leon Russell and Eric Clapton, among others.

Davis was close friends with Gene Clark. In 1971, he played on and produced Clark's second solo album, White Light, and provided lead guitar on Clark's album No Other in 1974. On Jackson Browne's 1972 debut album, Davis played the electric guitar solo on Browne's hit song "Doctor, My Eyes".

After guesting with Russell on Bob Dylan's 1971 singles "Watching the River Flow" and “When I Paint My Masterpiece”, and collaborating in Albert King’s Lovejoy, Davis went on to work with George Harrison, performing at the ex-Beatle's 1971 Concert for Bangladesh at Madison Square Garden, along with Ringo Starr, Billy Preston, Russell, Keltner, Clapton and others.

Two more solo albums followed: in 1972 Ululu, which included the original release of Harrison's "Sue Me, Sue You Blues", and in 1973 Keep Me Comin, occasionally listed as Keep On Coming. Around this time, Davis began playing with John Lennon, for whom he played lead guitar on the albums Walls and Bridges (1974) and Rock 'n' Roll (1975). In addition, Davis was a guest performer on other albums by former Beatles: Harrison's Extra Texture (1975) and Starr's Goodnight Vienna (1974) and Ringo's Rotogravure (1976).

In the late summer and fall of 1975, he performed with the Faces as second guitarist throughout their final US tour. It was on this tour that Davis became addicted to drugs.

After the Faces tour, Davis continued to work as a session player. In addition to the artists listed above, Davis contributed to albums by Eric Clapton, Rod Stewart, Keith Moon, Steve Miller, Guthrie Thomas, Harry Nilsson, Ry Cooder, David Cassidy, Willie Nelson, Neil Diamond, Rick Danko, Van Dyke Parks and others. He played on Leonard Cohen's Death of a Ladies' Man (1977), produced by Phil Spector.

In 1977, Davis moved to Hawaii. In 1981, he returned to Los Angeles broke and ravaged by drug and alcohol addiction. In and out of clinics, Davis disappeared from the music industry for a time, spending much of the 1980s dealing with alcohol and drug addiction. In 1985 he formed and played in the Graffiti Band, which coupled his music with the poetry of the Native American activist John Trudell (American Indian Movement). The result of this collaboration was the album, released initially only on cassette, called AKA Grafitti Man, which Bob Dylan called the best album of the year.

In the spring of 1987, the Graffiti Band performed with Taj Mahal at the Palomino Club in North Hollywood, California. At this show, George Harrison, Bob Dylan, and John Fogerty got up from the audience to join Davis and Mahal in an unrehearsed set which included Fogerty's "Proud Mary" and Dylan's "Watching the River Flow", as well as classics such as "Blue Suede Shoes", "Peggy Sue", "Honey Don't", "Matchbox" and "Gone, Gone, Gone".

== Personal life ==
Davis had a relationship with Patti Daley for about ten years. He married Tantalayo Saenz and, after his first marriage ended, he married Kelly Brady.

In his last years, he served as drug and alcohol counselor at the American Indian Free Clinic in Long Beach.

Davis collapsed in the laundry room of an apartment building and was pronounced dead in Venice, Los Angeles, California, on June 22, 1988. Police stated that his death appeared to be the result of a drug overdose. Davis had a fresh needle mark on one arm and burned matches and tin foil were scattered on the ground nearby. He was 43 years old.

== Legacy ==
In 2002, Davis was posthumously inducted into the Oklahoma Jazz Hall of Fame.

In 2018, Jesse Ed Davis was inducted into the Native American Music Hall of Fame at the 18th Annual Native American Music Awards. A performance tribute was held by his former Graffiti band members, Mark Shark and Quiltman. His cousins Richenda Davis Bates and Constance Davis Carter accepted the induction.

Doug Miller and Joy Harjo (Mvskoke), three-time U.S. Poet Laureate and jazz saxophonist, co-curated an exhibition, Jesse Ed Davis: Natural Anthem at the Bob Dylan Center in Tulsa, Oklahoma in 2024. Miller wrote a biography, Washita Love Child: The Rise of Indigenous Rock Star Jesse Ed Davis (2024), to which Harjo contributed an essay.

== Discography ==
=== With Junior Markham & The Tulsa Review ===
- "Let 'em Roll Johnny" / "Operator Operator" (Uptown Records, 1967)
- "Black Cherry" / "Gonna Send You Back to Georgia" (Uptown Records, 1967)

=== With Taj Mahal ===
- Taj Mahal (Columbia Records, 1968)
- The Natch'l Blues (Columbia, 1968)
- Giant Step (Columbia, 1969)
- Happy Just to Be Like I Am (Columbia, 1971), guitar on "Oh Susanna" and "Chevrolet"
- The Rolling Stones Rock and Roll Circus (ABKCO Records, 1996)

=== As leader ===
- ¡Jesse Davis! (Atco Records, 1971)
- Ululu (Atco Records, 1972)
- Keep Me Comin or Keep On Coming (Epic Records, 1973)
  - Bonus Record (Epic Records, 1973), an exclusive interview in Los Angeles with KMET-FM's B. Mitchel Reed - Jesse "Ed" Davis talks about his background, his music, and his new album (promotional release for Keep Me Comin album)
- Red Dirt Boogie: The Atco Recordings 1970-1972 (Real Gone Music, 2017), compilation of his first two albums
- "Tomorrow May Not Be Your Day: The Unissued Atco Recordings 1970 - 1971" (Real Gone Music, 2025)

=== As sideman ===
- Daughters of Albion - Daughters of Albion (1968)
- Look Inside the Asylum Choir - The Asylum Choir (1968)
- Live at Bill Graham's Fillmore West - various artists (1969)
- "Watching the River Flow / When I Paint My Masterpiece" - Bob Dylan (1971)
- Roger Tillison's Album - Roger Tillison (1971)
- Minnows - Marc Benno (1971)
- Feel Your Groove - Ben Sidran (1971)
- There's Gotta Be a Change - Albert Collins (1971)
- Booker T. & Priscilla - Booker T. & Priscilla (1971)
- Warm Waters - Charles Lloyd (1971)
- She Used to Wanna Be a Ballerina - Buffy Sainte-Marie (1971)
- Leon Russell and the Shelter People - Leon Russell (1971)
- Asylum Choir II - The Asylum Choir (1971)
- Endless Boogie - John Lee Hooker (1971)
- Lovejoy - Albert King (1971)
- White Light - Gene Clark (1971)
- The Concert for Bangladesh - George Harrison & Friends (1971)
- Ambush - Marc Benno (1972)
- Out the Window - Jim Pulte (1972)
- Salty - Alex Richman (1972)
- L.A. Midnight - B.B. King (1972)
- Jackson Browne - Jackson Browne (1972)
- Recall the Beginning...A Journey from Eden - Steve Miller Band (1972)
- Rod Taylor - Rod Taylor (1973)
- These Foolish Things - Bryan Ferry (1973)
- Last of the Brooklyn Cowboys - Arlo Guthrie (1973)
- Home at Last - Wayne Berry (1974)
- Arlo Guthrie - Arlo Guthrie (1974)
- L.A. Turnaround - Bert Jansch (1974)
- No Other - Gene Clark (1974)
- Walls and Bridges - John Lennon (1974)
- A Toot and a Snore in '74 - John Lennon, Paul McCartney (bootleg, 1974)
- Goodnight Vienna - Ringo Starr (1974)
- Pussy Cats - Harry Nilsson (1974)
- That's a Plenty - Pointer Sisters (1974)
- ST11261 - Brewer & Shipley (1974)
- Burnin' Thing - Mac Davis (1975)
- The Eyes of an Only Child - Tom Jans (1975)
- See How the Years Have Gone By - Valdy (1975)
- Stars - Cher (1975)
- Two Sides of the Moon - Keith Moon (1975)
- Extra Texture (Read All About It) - George Harrison (1975)
- Rock 'n' Roll - John Lennon (1975)
- Duit on Mon Dei - Harry Nilsson (1975)
- Born to Be with You - Dion (1975)
- New Arrangement - Jackie DeShannon (1975)
- Earthbound - The 5th Dimension (1975)
- Midnight on the Water - David Bromberg Band (1975)
- Atlantic Crossing - Rod Stewart (1975)
- A Night on the Town - Rod Stewart (1976)
- Sandman - Harry Nilsson (1976)
- Diggin' It - Dunn & Rubini (1976)
- Cupid's Arrow - David Blue (1976)
- Welcome to Club Casablanca - Long John Baldry (1976)
- Time Is on My Side - Tracy Nelson (1976)
- Motion - Geoff Muldaur (1976)
- Attitudes - Attitudes (1976)
- Home Is Where the Heart Is - David Cassidy (1976)
- Beautiful Noise - Neil Diamond (1976)
- Slow Down World - Donovan (1976)
- No Reason to Cry - Eric Clapton (1976)
- Ringo's Rotogravure - Ringo Starr (1976)
- Clang of the Yankee Reaper - Van Dyke Parks (1976)
- Death of a Ladies' Man - Leonard Cohen (1977)
- Blue Collar (soundtrack) - with Captain Beefheart and Jack Nitzsche (1978)
- A Little Kiss in the Night - Ben Sidran (1978)
- "Precious Love" - Emmylou Harris (1980)
- The Legend of Jesse James - various artists (1980)
- Kent State (soundtrack) - various artists (1981)
- Hobo Eagle Thief - Guthrie Thomas (1983)
- AKA Graffiti Man - John Trudell (1986)
- Heart Jump Bouquet - John Trudell (1987)
- Taj - Taj Mahal (1987)
- Slide of Hand - Scott Colby (1987)
- It's a Sin to Be Rich - Lightnin' Hopkins (1992, recorded in 1972)
- "1000 Dollar Wedding" and "Hot Burrito #1" - Gram Parsons (1992, Extended play side B only, recorded in 1971)
