= Night People =

Night People or The Night People may refer to:

== Film and television ==
- Night People (1954 film), an American thriller by Nunnally Johnson
- Night People, a 2005 film featuring Katrina Bryan
- Night People (2015 film), an Irish horror film by Gerard Lough
- "Night People" (Doctors), a 2004 television episode

== Literature ==
- The Night People (novel), a 1947 novel by Francis Flagg
- Night People, a 1992 book by Barry Gifford
- The Night People, a 1977 novel by Jack Finney
- The Night People, a 2005 short-story collection by Michael Reaves

== Music ==
=== Groups and labels ===
- The Night People, an American band featured on the 1985 compilation album Highs in the Mid-Sixties, Volume 14
- Night People, a record label whose roster included Redrum

=== Albums ===
- Night People (Classix Nouveaux album) or the title song, 1981
- Night People (Lee Dorsey album) or the title song, 1978
- Night People (You Me at Six album) or the title song, 2017
- Night People, by Early Day Miners, 2011
- Night People, by Mort Herbert, 1956

=== Songs ===
- "Night People" (The Human League song), 2010
- "Night People", by the Agents, fronted by James Griffin, 1980
- "Night People", by Baker Gurvitz Army from Hearts on Fire, 1976
- "Night People", by Dio from Dream Evil, 1987
- "Night People", by John Cooper Clarke from Zip Style Method, 1982
- "Night People", by Kool & the Gang from Celebrate!, 1980
- "Night People", by Melba Moore from Burn, 1979
- "Night People", by Ray Stevens from Unreal!!!, 1970
- "Night People", by the Tubes from Love Bomb, 1985
- "Night People", written by Tommy Wolf and Fran Landesman for the Broadway musical The Nervous Set, 1959

== Other uses ==
- Night owl, a person who naturally stays up late at night
- Night People, a Marvel Comics team that included Demolition Man
- Night People, supernatural individuals in L. J. Smith's novel series Night World
