= Busta Jones =

American singer-songwriter (1951–1995)

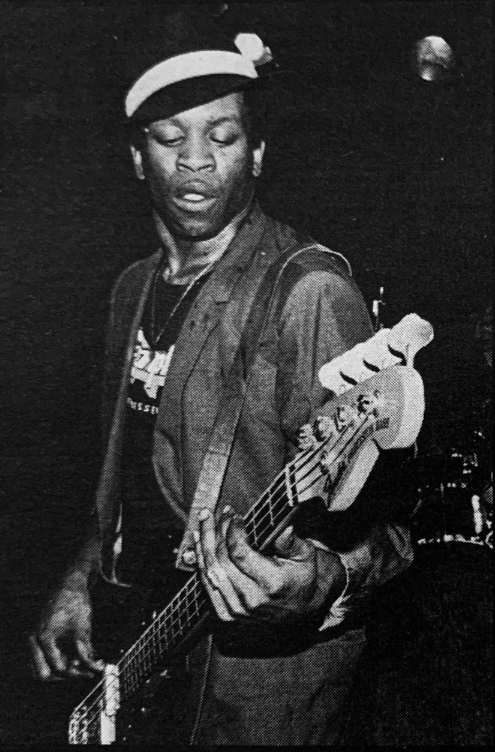
- Jones in 1983

Background information
- Born: Michael Jones; September 26, 1951; Memphis, Tennessee, U.S.
- Died: December 6, 1995 (aged 44) Memphis, Tennessee, U.S.
- Genres: New wave; experimental pop; alternative rock; post-punk; punk rock; funk; disco
- Occupations: Musician; singer-songwriter; artist; bassist
- Instrument: Bass
- Years active: 1969–1995
- Formerly of: Talking Heads; David Byrne; Brian Eno; Robert Fripp; Chris Spedding; The Ramones; Michel Pagliaro

Michael "Busta" Jones (born Michael Jones, September 26, 1951 – December 6, 1995) was an American musician, songwriter and producer. He is known for his bass work both live and in the studio with Albert King, Talking Heads, Gang of Four, Chris Spedding as well as many others during a decade spanning career that lasted from the late 1960s until his death in 1995.

== Early life ==
Jones was born in Memphis, Tennessee, on September 26, 1951. At an early age, he began to teach himself guitar. By the time he had reach his teens, Jones had earned himself a spot in Albert King's touring band on bass, playing alongside future collaborators and The Kinsey Report band members, Ralph Kinsey and Donald Kinsey.

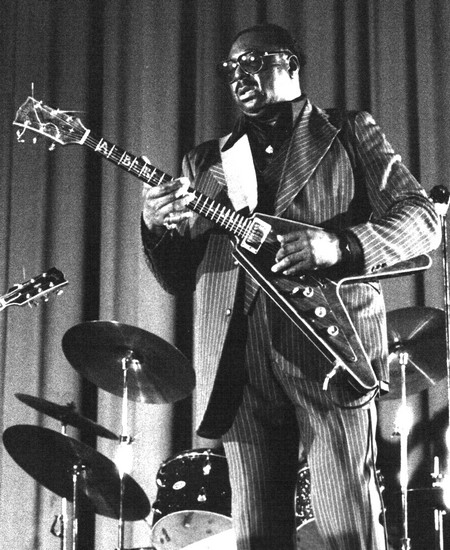
While playing with Albert King, Jones met brothers Albert and Donald Kinsey

== Career ==
=== Early career in Memphis (1969–1972) ===
Following his time with Albert King, Jones became increasingly involved with the blues revival music scene in Memphis, playing with musicians such as Jim Dickinson and Lee Baker. With Dickinson, Jones would play bass on the Delta Experimental Project, which was a series of compilation albums made up of recordings of older bluesmen from the Mississippi Delta, such as Sleepy John Estes and Johnny Woods. However, Jones didn't feel as deep a connection to older traditional blues as Dickinson, feeling that "I'd sit around with them and get the feel of it, but there wasn't really a bass guitar involved, it was mostly acoustic."

Rather Jones was much more into the idea of "crossover music," which is what drove him to work with white artists like Lee Baker in the band Moloch. Following lackluster sales of their self-titled debut, Moloch as a band more or less dissolved, leaving Baker as the sole original member. When reforming the band to create the follow-up 7-inch single, Baker recruited Jones to play bass for the songs "Cocaine Katy" and "The Terrorizing of Miss Nancy Jane", both released in 1972.

=== Moving to London, work with Sharks and Brian Eno (1972–1973) ===
Having a fascination with British bands who were at this time also creating a crossover sound, Jones would leave Memphis and join the British band Sharks in July 1972. Originally formed with ex-Free bassist Andy Fraser, drummer Marty Simon, guitarist Chris Spedding, and lead singer Stephen "Snips" Parsons, Sharks toured England, supporting acts like Roxy Music. Jones was recruited to replace Fraser after the latter left the band due to injuries sustained in a car accident following a Sharks gig.

Jones recorded bass for Shark's sophomore album Jab It In Yore Eye. Released in 1974, the album also features Jones' first songwriting credit for the song Baby Shine A Light. The new lineup of the band, which also included keyboardist Nick Judd, were recruited to play tracks on Brian Eno's first solo record Here Come The Warm Jets, which was recorded September 1973 and released January 1974.

=== Return to North America, work in the US and Canada (1973–1980) ===
Sharks would break up following their second album, and although the band would reunite in the 1990s and again in the late 2010s, Jones would not be a part of either lineup. Instead, Jones would again work with Donald and Ralph Kinsey and form the band White Lightnin'. The group would go on to put out a self titled album on Island Records, featuring production by Mountain bassist Felix Pappalardi and arrangements by future Talking Heads manager Gary Kurfirst. The band would open for acts like Aerosmith, Peter Frampton and Black Oak Arkansas.

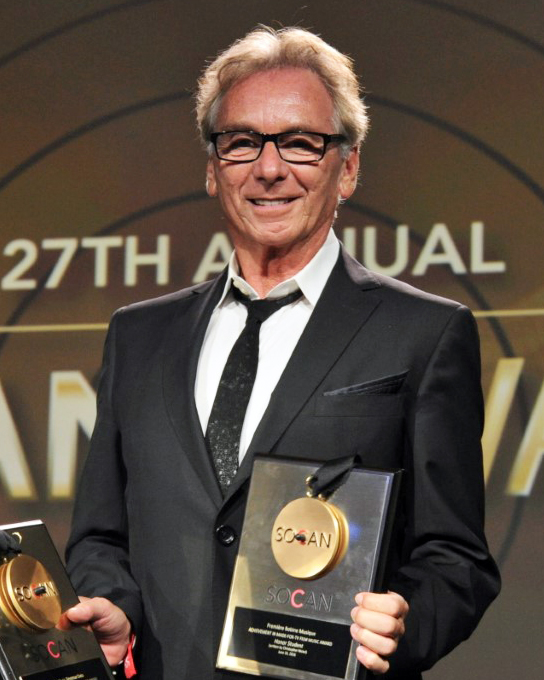
Marty Simon, who Jones had met while playing in Sharks, helped introduce Jones to the Canadian music scene.

By 1977, White Lightnin' had broken up and Jones would begin to work in the Canadian rock scene, especially around Montreal. Through his former Sharks bandmate, Marty Simon, Jones would begin working with Walter Rossi, Dwayne Ford as the backing band for Michel Pagliaro, sometimes dubbed "The Rockers." Although never releasing any recorded material, The Rockers would eventually become the studio musicians for a later project Rossi would do with George Lagios called Bombers.

Bombers would go on to release their first self titled album, Bombers, in 1978, with Jones providing both bass and vocals to the album's songs. Bombers was made up of mostly reworked tracks that were originally by Kurt Haunenstein, as well as a reworking of the traditional Mexican song "Per Quaiche Dollero in Piu", that was called "The Mexican" on the album.

Although Bombers was not a runaway success, the first album did generate enough buzz to warrant the band's sophomore album, appropriately titled Bombers 2. This time, the songs would be mostly originals written by Jones and Simon. Bombers 2 would spawn the minor hit "(Everybody) Get Dancin'", which peaked at #3 on the Billboard Dance Club chart in March 1979.

In 1979 and 1980, Jones would begin more directly working with members of the band Talking Heads. In September 1979, Jones would play backing bass alongside David Byrne, credited as "Absalm el Habib", on the Robert Fripp songs "Under Heavy Manners" and "The Zero of the Signified". Following this in early 1980 Jones was asked to play bass alongside Chris Frantz on drums for the Brian Eno-David Byrne album My Life In The Bush of Ghosts. Additionally, Jones would work with Jerry Harrison on two different projects. First, the self titled album for the band Double, which saw Jones writing music and playing multiple instruments alongside Harrison on keyboards and synthesizer, and then the self-titled EP for the band Escalators, which again had Jones writing most of the songs and Harrison playing guitar as well as synthesizer. Alongside all of these collaborations, Jones would also begin giving bass lessons to Tina Weymouth.

=== Solo album and touring with Talking Heads (1980–1981) ===
In late 1979, Jones would drop his first solo single "(You) Keep On Making Me Hot", produced with the help of a frequent Canadian collaborator, Gino Soccio. This would be followed by Busta Jones!, the only full length solo album Jones would ever release. Featuring performance by Parliament-Funkadelic members Tyrone Lampkin on drums and Bernie Worrell on keyboards and synthesizer, as well as longtime collaborator Walter Rossi. The album received lukewarm reviews, Hugh Wyatt of the New York Daily News called the album "hard-driving urban funk".

1980 would see Jones enter possibly his most well-known era of his career, his touring stint with Talking Heads. Following the recording of Talking Heads' fourth album Remain in Light, the band decided that in order to perform the newly recorded songs live, Talking Heads would have to expand from 4-piece core member group to a 9-person ensemble. Jones, having already worked directly with all band members individually at one point or another, was asked to join as a second bassist as well as tasked with the job of finding other musicians to be fill out the lineup. Jones would be responsible for recruiting both back up singer Dolete McDonald and percussionist Steve Scales for the tour.

McDonald and Jones had known and worked with each other previously, with McDonald having performed backing vocals for Jones' album. Steve Scales on the other hand, was openly thinking of quitting music altogether and going to business school. Luckily, Jones called Scales just in time, and he was onboard for the project.

This new expanded lineup would perform during 1980 and 1981 as part of the Remain in Light Tour. The first appearance with the large band was on August 23, 1980, at the Heatwave festival in Canada in front of 70,000 people; Robert Hilburn of the Los Angeles Times called the band's new music a "rock-funk sound with dramatic, near show-stopping force". Since the album wouldn't be released until October, Heatwave, as well as the following tour stop in Central Park, New York City, would be the first time songs like "Once in a Lifetime" and "Houses in Motion" were heard by the public. Jones would continue to tour with Talking Heads until February 28, 1981, when the tour ended in Tokyo Japan. But when Talking Heads began to tour again in 1982, Jones had left the lineup.

Live recordings from the Remain in Light Tour would end up on Talking Head's first live album, 1982's The Name of This Band is Talking Heads. With the album's release, Jones received recognition alongside other touring members for his contributions to the band's sound and direction. Terry Lawson of Dayton, Ohio's The Journal Herald said that "With the help of musicians like Busta Jones and Bernie Worrell, the Heads achieve a sort of suburban soulfulness that's cool, clean and precise."

=== Chris Spedding, Gang of Four, and other work post-Talking Heads in New York (1981–1983) ===
Within two weeks of finishing his time with Talking Heads, Jones would record yet another live album, this time with former Sharks bandmate Chris Spedding. The album, called Friday the 13th since it was recorded on Friday March 13, 1981, at Trax in New York City, was focused on a rock power trio performance of songs by both Spedding and Jones. Rounding out the trio for the album was drummer Tony Machine, who was known at the time for his work with the New York Dolls as well as solo projects by Doll's members David Johansen and Sylvain Sylvain. During the performance of the song "Hey Miss Betty", Spedding directly references Jones during some on stage banter, saying "Maybe you think you think we're taking a bit of a risk here, Friday the 13th, you know, doing a live album. But I ain't superstitious. I mean I've even got a black cat in the band."

The group would tour for most of 1981 under the name "The Trio", although occasionally billed as just "Chris Spedding" or "The Chris Spedding Band". Their show was loud and full of energy; Tom Harrison, music critic for The Province in Vancouver, British Columbia, wrote that The Trio's performance was "enough to batter the kidneys." Some time around late summer of 1981, Tony Machine would leave The Trio to work again with David Johansen. He was replaced by New York experimental composer percussionist David Van Tieghem.

Concurrent with The Trio tour, Jones would also play bass as a member of Gang of Four. Dave Allen, the band's previous bassist, had quit the band after a show in Montreal, Canada, following months of distress while touring. The other three members of Gang of Four would go to New York City in search of a replacement bassist for upcoming tour dates. They all knew Jones from his work with Talking Heads and Brian Eno and asked if he could do the dates. Jones agreed, and thus began a marathon rehearsal session to get Jones settled into the band. Although skeptical that Jones could so quickly replace Allen, guitarist Andy Gill and singer Jon King quickly changed their minds as they saw how immediately Jones understood the band's dynamic. Jones would play a number of shows with Gang of Four, most notably a gig at the Showbox in Seattle which had future members of Nirvana in the audience. King, when reflecting on Jones' time with the group said "There was incredible energy and an amazing audience. It became a transcendental symbiosis of crowd and band. The Busta Jones gigs were the best gigs we did, I think." Despite all of this, Jones would not continue to work with Gang of Four, being replaced by Sara Lee by the end of 1981.

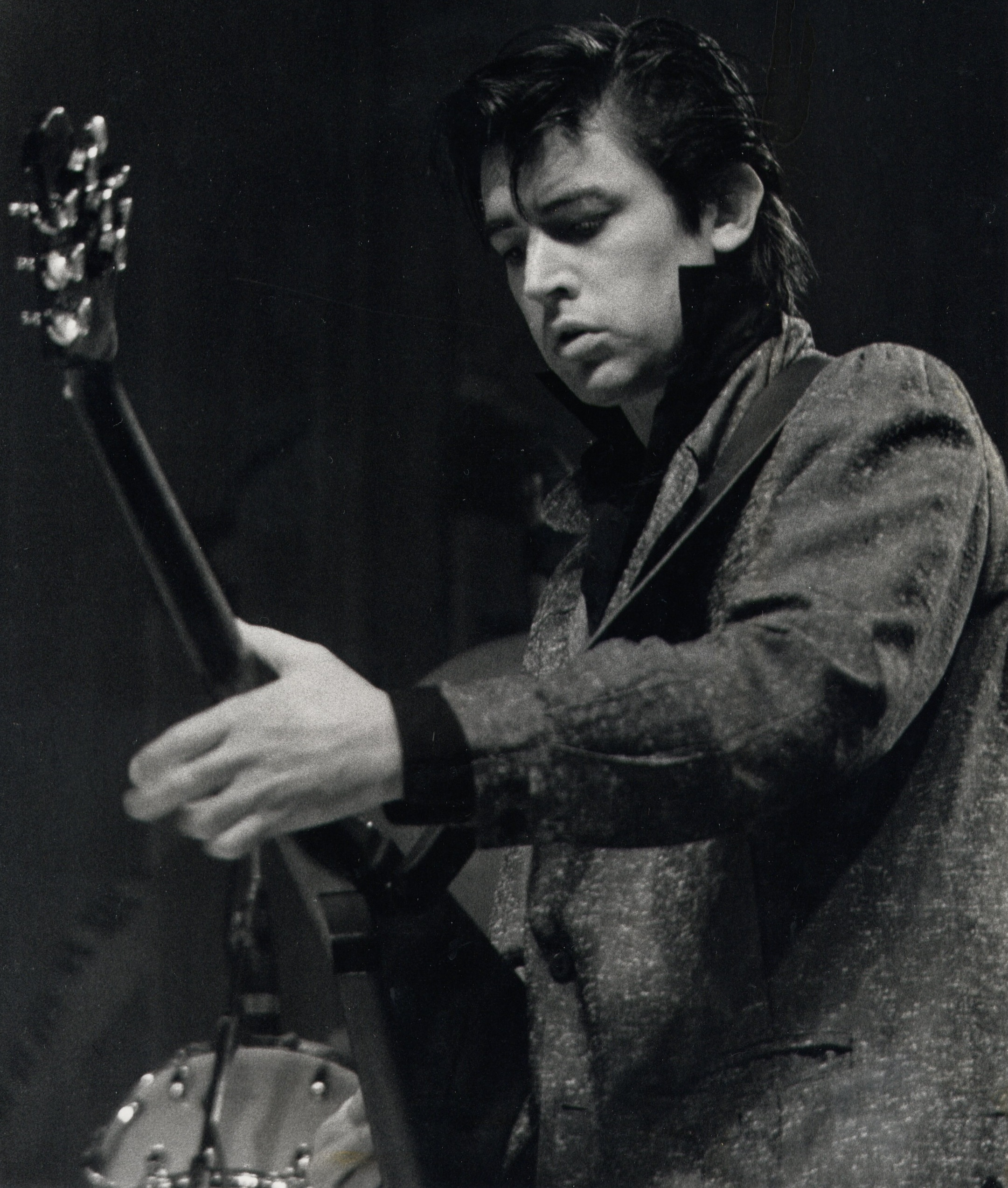
Following his stint with Talking Heads, Jones would collaborate once again with guitarist Chris Spedding.

Following his work with Chris Spedding, Jones would continue to work towards a music career in New York City. He would play at clubs like The Peppermint Lounge, The Mudd Club and The Danceteria. Former Talking Heads collaborators David Byrne, Jerry Harrison Bernie Worrell, and Dolette McDonald were known to come on stage and join Jones. These shows coincided with Jones' increasing relationship with musicians Dash Hoving and Marty Feier. Dash and Feier were both working on organizing a larger project that would be known as "The Seclusions." Although occasionally playing live, The Seclusions were more intended to be a studio project, recruiting a number of key players in the New York scene, including Jimmy Destri, Joey Ramone, Jimmy Ripp, and Jay Dee Daugherty. This collaboration with Joey Ramone would lead to future work for Jones with The Ramones. Jones co-wrote the song "Chasing the Night" off the Too Tough to Die record, with Joey Ramone and Dee Dee Ramone.

Despite this success, Jones would soon choose to leave New York City, although the reason remains unclear. Jones was known at this time to have issues with substance abuse, gaining the reputation as a "partyer" with "rough edges". Additionally, Jones felt as though he was being held back by his race at times. Even though Jones had worked with many punk and rock acts like The Ramones and Talking Heads, he still felt there were difficulties in pursuing the music he wanted to play. In an interview from 1982 Jones said:

It's hard for a black rock act to get a deal, because if you're black you're supposed to just do dance music. But I grew up listening to the same records as everyone else, not just Motown and Stax, but Cream and Hendrix, British rock bands. I've written a lot of rock songs over the years, and I really feel that it's time for me to get out and do all these things that I've never had a chance to do before.

Jones would leave New York City to return home to Memphis by the end of 1983.

=== Later career ===
Continuing his musical career in London, Jones worked with video director Robert Milton Wallace for "My Hands are Shaking" featuring harrowing footage from the Tiananmen Square massacre where Chinese authorities cracked down on a civil rights protest by students in 1989. When asked how he dealt with his own experiences of inequality and racism he said his mother had told him to "just laugh" and he did.

Jones died of heart failure on December 6, 1995, in Memphis, Tennessee.
