= Sharks (rock band) =

British rock band

Background information
- Origin: London, England
- Genres: Rock
- Years active: 1972–1974, 1993–1995, 2015–present
- Members: Steve Parsons (Snips); Chris Spedding; Paul Cook; Tosh Ogawa; Nick Judd
- Past members: Andy Fraser; Marty Simon; Busta Cherry Jones; Blair Cunningham; Jackie Badger
- Website: sharks-band.com

Sharks are a British rock band formed in 1972 by bassist Andy Fraser upon his departure from Free. They were signed to Island Records and were highly rated by critics, especially for Chris Spedding's guitar work.

The original line-up consisted of Fraser (bass, piano), Snips (real name, Steve Parsons) (vocals), Spedding (guitar) and Marty Simon (drums).

== History ==
=== Formation ===
Andy Fraser had originally contacted Chris Spedding, in July 1971, to discuss playing in his first post-Free band, Toby. When Fraser formed Sharks a year later, he contacted Spedding again and, this time, they agreed to work together. Fraser had already recruited his friend Marty Simon, so auditions were held for a singer to complete the line-up. Robert Palmer and Leo Sayer were turned down in favour of an unknown 21-year-old from Yorkshire, Steve Parsons, also known as Snips, originally spotted by Island A&R man Muff Winwood. Snips had previously fronted a Hull-based band called Nothingeverhappens. Parsons "played one song of his, "Snakes and Swallowtails" and he was in", Spedding later told Melody Maker.

=== 1970s ===
Sharks' first gig was in October 1972, in Islington and they played a few clubs in Europe during December 1972, before returning to London, to record their debut album.

In January & February 1973, Sharks embarked on a UK tour, playing clubs and universities. To promote the band, whilst touring, Chris Spedding customized his Pontiac Le Mans, fitting a shark fin on the roof and fibreglass teeth on the grille. On 19 February 1973, on the way back to London from a gig in Cleethorpes, the car skidded and hit a tree. Fraser suffered injuries to his wrist and, during recuperation, had second thoughts about the band.

After a short break, the band went back on the road in March and April, opening for Roxy Music, although Fraser had some difficulty playing with his injury. On 17 March, they made an appearance on the BBC Two programme, Old Grey Whistle Test. The tour ended on 15 April, in Cardiff.

Their debut album, First Water, was released in the same month to critical acclaim, but Fraser left shortly afterwards and the band began searching for a replacement. Those considered included Tom Robinson, Ric Grech and Boz Burrell. Mick Jagger then recommended a bass player from Memphis, Tennessee, Busta Cherry Jones, who joined in July 1973, along with the ex-Audience keyboard player, Nick Judd.

A new UK tour with this line-up began in September 1973 and ran through until March 1974, when their second album, Jab It in Yore Eye, was released. The band then toured the United States during April and May 1974, travelling in the same bus used by the Beatles on their first American tour in 1964. The first two albums of the band were described as a mixture of woozy blues and hard rock.

On their return to the UK, they began recording their third album (produced by John Entwistle of the Who), with the working title Music Breakout, in June 1974. However, Simon was unhappy with the recording and was replaced by Stuart Francis. Jones then decided to return to the States, selling one of Spedding's guitars, which he stole, to pay for the flight. With Island Records not keen on the original master recordings for the third album, financial support was withdrawn and the band folded in October 1974. The album had an unofficial release in 2016, under the title Car Crash Tapes.

Spedding continued his session work and solo career, whilst Snips joined Ginger Baker in the Baker Gurvitz Army and then went solo himself, before beginning a successful career as a film and TV composer.

=== 1990s ===
In 1993, Spedding and Snips began recording together again as Sharks, although the album, Like a Black Van Parked on a Dark Curve..., was not released until 1995. There was a one-off gig in London, in December 1995, featuring Snips, Spedding, Jackie Badger (bass), Blair Cunningham (drums) and Nick Judd (keyboards).

=== 2010s ===
In 2011, Chris Spedding and Steve Parsons re-united for a new project, King Mob, featuring Martin Chambers (ex-Pretenders) on drums, Glen Matlock (ex-Sex Pistols) on bass and a new guitarist, named 'Sixteen'. Their debut album, Force 9, was released on the Steamhammer label, in November 2011.

During 2013, Andy Fraser contacted Chris Spedding and the two performed UK gigs together for the first time in 40 years, backed by Fraser's band, Tobi. Fraser joined Spedding on his 2014 album Joyland, which was produced and co-written by Steve Parsons. The three musicians thought of reviving the band Sharks, however Fraser died soon after, in March 2015. Spedding and Parsons went ahead with the reformation, including Nick Judd from the previous incarnations of the band and adding the drummer Paul Cook (ex-Sex Pistols) and the bassist Tosh Ogawa.

In 2016, the band played at The Borderline in London, including new songs from the album they were preparing, and have continued playing live shows in the UK and Japan. Their 2017 show at the Lexington was described by Über Röck as 'one of the best club gigs I have seen last year and this'.

Sharks released the single "One Last Thrill" on 30 September 2016 and, in January 2017, the album Killers of the Deep (cover art by comic book artist Shaky Kane), both through 3Ms Records. Unlike the albums from the 1970s, which were produced by a record company, this time the musicians recorded the album on their own and had more control on their work. They made the recordings as live as possible, none of the tracks having more than four takes.

The album was well received, being mentioned the steady groove and the good song-writing quality, deserving to deliver the success that eluded Sharks first time round. The rock is more melodic, with the guitarist Spedding alternating between swamp-blues ("Killer On The New Tube") and sharp rockabilly ("Can’t Get The Devil").

Sharks themselves have been filming their 21st century revival for a documentary feature to be entitled One Last Thrill. In June 2017, they released a six-minute promo clip of the film through the Vive Le Rock website.

=== Not a Rock-Doc: A Shark's Tail ===
Steve Parsons and Anke Trojan directed the 2023 documentary Not a Rock-Doc: A Shark's Tail, about the ups and downs in the story of this band, from the success heights in the '70 to the issues that led to its dissolution and then to further insights around the subsequent reunion. Filmed in Berlin, Tokyo and London, the film was noticed for its integration of various angles of raw footage and for its humor and irony. The narrative is stirred by interactions with Steve Parsons and Chris Spedding, notably Jordan Mooney (Pamela Rooke) managing to bring to light previously unknown nuances in discussions with an otherwise tight Chris Spedding.

== Discography ==
- First Water (1973)
- Jab It in Yore Eye (1974)
- Music Breakout (produced in 1974, but unissued; released in 2016, under the title Car Crash Tapes)
- Like a Black Van Parked on a Dark Curve (1995)
- Killers of the Deep (2017)
- Ready Set Go (2018)
