= Gun (1960s band) =

British rock band

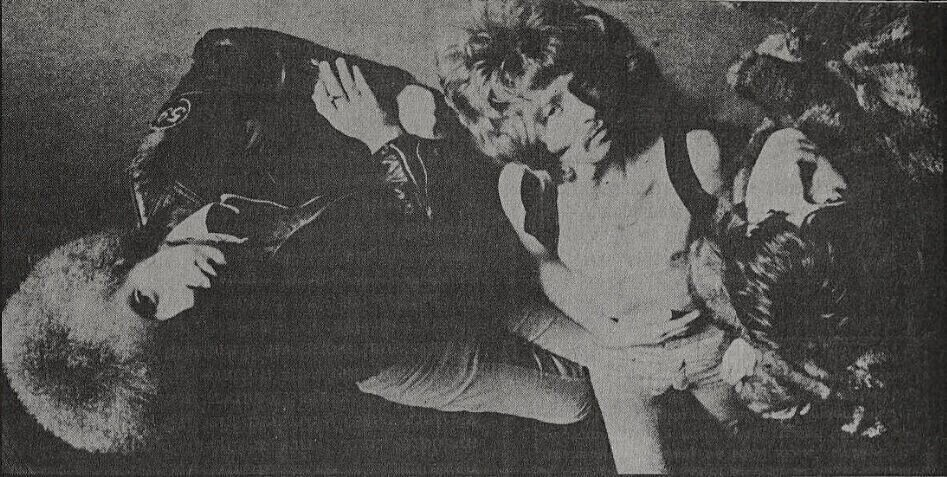
- c. 1969

Background information
- Origin: London, England
- Genres: Hard rock, psychedelic rock, proto-metal
- Years active: 1967–1970
- Label: CBS
- Past members: Adrian Gurvitz; Paul Gurvitz; Louie Farrell

The Gun were a late 1960s British rock guitar trio who had a single British Top Ten hit, "Race with the Devil" and recorded two albums before disbanding. The band included brothers Paul Gurvitz and Adrian Gurvitz.

== History ==
Evolving from the Ilford-based band, The Knack, which included guitarist/vocalist Paul Gurvitz (born Paul Anthony Gurvitz, 6 July 1944, High Wycombe, Buckinghamshire (although he was known by the surname Curtis until the early 1970s), his brother Adrian Gurvitz and drummer Louie Farrell, the trio changed their name in early 1968 to The Gun. The full Knack lineup had been Paul Curtis (Gurvitz) on guitar and vocals, Louie Farrell (born Brian John Farrell, 8 December 1947, Goodmayes, Essex) (who had joined The Knack in mid 1966) on drums, Gearie Kenworthy on bass guitar (born 17 October 1946), Tim Mycroft playing organ (born 1949, Purewell, Christchurch, Dorset died 1 January 2010), and for a short while, Jon Anderson of Yes. The Knack had regularly performed at the UFO Club, supporting bands such as Pink Floyd, Arthur Brown and Tomorrow. Recording sessions at Olympic Studios produced the unreleased single "Lights on the Wall", while in November 1967 they recorded for the BBC alternative music radio programme Top Gear and twice played on air. In early 1968, the band changed its line-up to a trio, with Paul Curtis (Gurvitz) on bass, Louie Farrell on drums and Adrian Curtis (Gurvitz) on guitar.

After being signed to CBS Records in early 1968, the band scored a hit with the opening track from their eponymous album (1968), "Race with the Devil". Issued as a single in October 1968, it reached the top 10 in the UK Singles Chart, number 35 on the Australian Singles Chart and number 1 in many UK territories in March 1969. Jimi Hendrix quoted the song's riff during his song "Machine Gun" at the Isle of Wight Festival in 1970, as did Status Quo on their song "Forty Five Hundred Times" during a stage show at Apollo Theatre in Glasgow in 1976. "Race with the Devil" has been covered by Judas Priest ((1977) on the 2001 remastered CD version of Sin After Sin), Black Oak Arkansas (on their 1977 album Race with the Devil), Girlschool (on their 1980 album Demolition), and Church of Misery (on their 1996 demo, released as a split album with Acrimony, and on their full-length LP Vol. 1).

Their debut album's cover is noteworthy as it was the first by Roger Dean (credited as "W. Roger Dean" on the back of the sleeve). AllMusic described it as having a "distinctive psych-flavoured proto-metal" sound. Their second album, Gunsight included "cover design + photos" by Hipgnosis and was released in 1969.

Despite releasing a number of other singles, and an attempt by their record label to identify them with the underground counter-culture, the band had no further hits.

== Aftermath ==
After a short time working separately, the Gurvitz brothers formed Three Man Army in 1971 and recorded three albums.

Between 1974 and 1976, Three Man Army became the Baker Gurvitz Army with Ginger Baker, the former drummer for Cream, in the line-up. The trio recorded three albums: Baker Gurvitz Army, Elysian Encounter and Hearts on Fire. During the same period, the Gurvitz brothers recorded two albums under the name The Graeme Edge Band, with drummer Graeme Edge of The Moody Blues: Kick Off Your Muddy Boots and Paradise Ballroom. It was not a touring band, and also featured Baker. Paul Gurvitz latterly toured as the Paul Gurvitz and the New Army.

== Discography ==
- Gun – March 1969
- Gunsight – December 1969
