= White Rock (film) =

- Film poster
- Directed by: Tony Maylam
- Written by: Tony Maylam
- Produced by: Michael Samuelson
- Narrated by: James Coburn
- Cinematography: Arthur Wooster
- Edited by: Gordon Swire
- Music by: Rick Wakeman
- Production company: Worldmark-Samuelson International Productions
- Distributed by: Harvey Weinstein and Bob Weinstein (US)
- Release date: January 29, 1977
- Running time: 76 minutes
- Country: United Kingdom
- Language: English

White Rock is a 1977 British documentary film about the 1976 Winter Olympics held in Innsbruck, Austria. The film was narrated by James Coburn, and directed by Tony Maylam. The film was nominated in 1977 for the Robert Flaherty Award (Feature Length Film, Documentary In Content) by the British Academy of Film and Television Arts. A soundtrack album, White Rock was released by Rick Wakeman in 1977 and it entered the UK Albums Chart on 12 February 1977, where it spent 9 weeks and reached number 14.

== Production and release ==
Michael Samuelson was given the chance to make the 1976 Winter Olympics film, and he contacted Tony Maylam to direct and write the film. However, they felt that only two films had "worked". Olympia by Leni Riefenstahl of the 1936 Summer Olympics held in Berlin and the Kon Ichikawa film Tokyo Olympiad of the 1964 Summer Olympics held in Tokyo. They decided that they did not want the film to be a documentary, but a feature film.

We came up with the concept of dealing with just six events - with each having its own theme and being representative of a particular sport. For example, among the Alpine sports, we've really gone all-out for the Men's Downhill - which is the glamorous, prestigious event rather than including the Ladies' Downhill, the Men's Slalom or the Men's Giant Slalom, events which the average viewer knows nothing about. We felt it would be better to choose a relative few of the representative sports of the Winter Olympics and do them really well, as opposed to spreading our coverage...With the James Coburn involvement we have given our audience a way to experience what it feels like to do these things.

— Tony Maylam

Tony Maylam made two music movies White Rock and Genesis: In Concert, also known as the Genesis Concert Movie, which is a movie shot in concert at The Apollo Theatre, Glasgow and the New Bingley Hall, Stafford with the rock group Genesis. They were screened together as a double bill. Rock promoters Harvey Weinstein and Bob Weinstein purchased the films for the US market and distributed them as Sensasia.

== See also ==
- Cinema of the United Kingdom
- Winter Olympic Games
