= Peter Lemer =

English jazz pianist

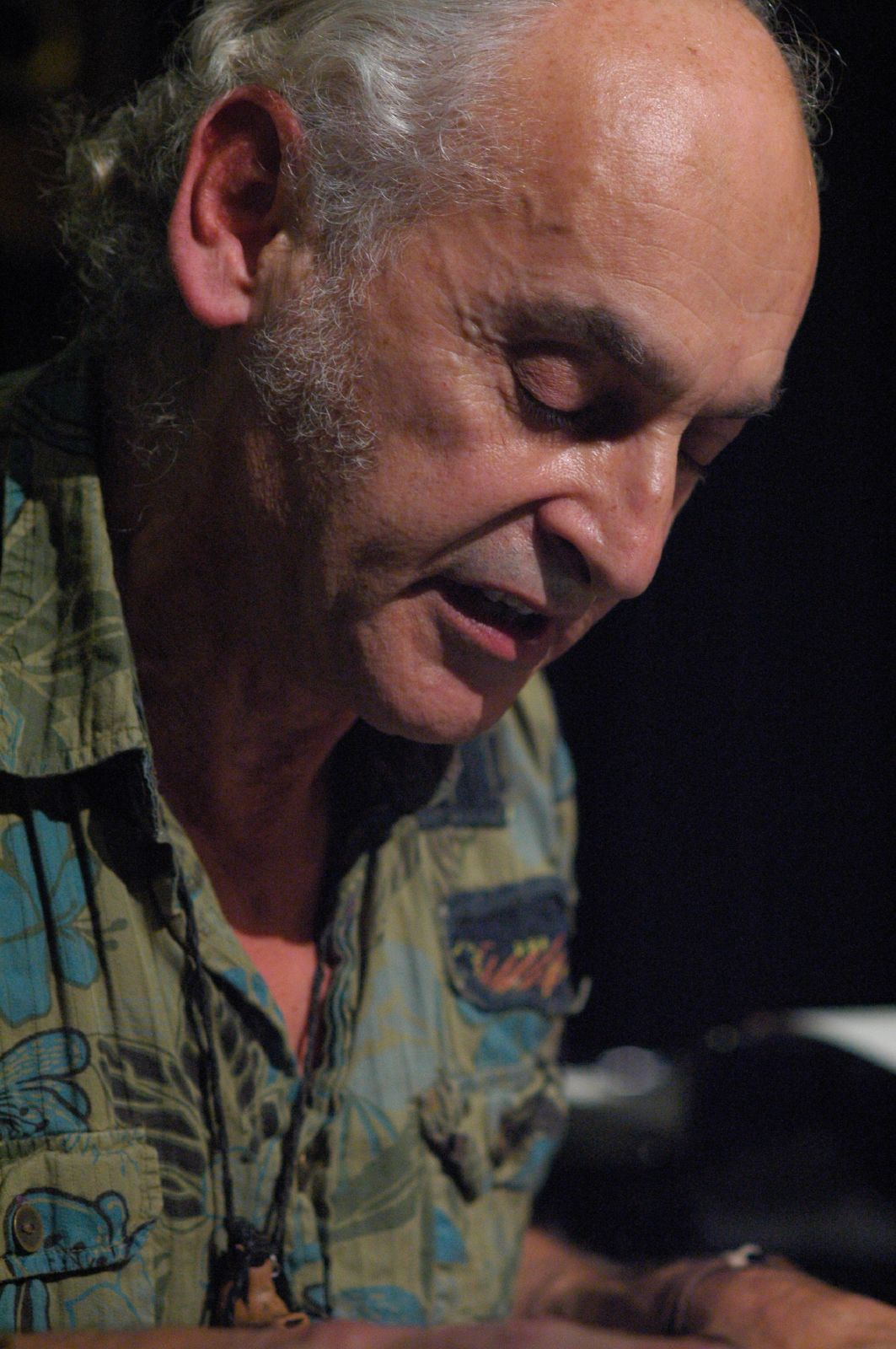

Background information
- Born: 14 June 1942 (age 83); London, England
- Occupation: Musician
- Instruments: Piano, keyboard
- Partner: Margaret Gardiner (2000–present)

Peter Naphtali Lemer (born 14 June 1942) is an English jazz musician. He worked with the Pete Lemer Quintet, Spontaneous Music Ensemble, Annette Peacock, Harry Beckett, Gilgamesh, Baker Gurvitz Army, Seventh Wave, Harry Beckett's Joy Unlimited, Pierre Moerlen's Gong, Mike Oldfield Group, In Cahoots, and Miller/Baker/Lemer. He currently works with In Cahoots, Peter Lemer Trio/Quartet, Barbara Thompson's Paraphernalia, and the Peter Lemer-Billy Thompson Quartet and Duo.

== Early life and education ==
Peter Lemer was born in London, England. He studied piano and composition at the Royal Academy of Music with Sven Weber and John Gardner, privately with Thomas Rajna, and then at workshops in London run by Jack Goldzweig (who had himself co-coached in New York with Mal Waldron and John Mehegan). Lemer then went to New York to study double bass with David Walter, attended workshops run by Bill Dixon, and studied piano with Jaki Byard and Paul Bley.

== Career ==
In 1965, Lemer formed a trio with John Stevens and Jeff Clyne, which opened the Little Theatre Club. In 1966, he formed the Peter Lemer Quintet, with Jon Hiseman on drums, George Khan on tenor sax, John Surman on baritone sax and Tony Reeves on bass. This band successfully played a season at Ronnie Scott's and helped to pave the way for the British free jazz movement of the late 1960s and early 1970s, along with the Mike Taylor trio. It cut one LP, Local Colour which was engineered by Eddie Kramer.

In 1969, Lemer worked with the Spontaneous Music Ensemble, an experimental jazz group.

In that year, he also joined Barbara Thompson. The relationship developed into Thompson forming Paraphernalia with husband Jon Hiseman. Paraphernalia became the most frequently performing jazz-oriented group in Europe, and Lemer was keyboardist for most of the years up to the present, including ten albums recorded live or at Thompson and Hiseman's Temple Music Studios.

In 1974, Lemer joined Gilgamesh and played several gigs and some BBC sessions. He subsequently became an in-demand session player.

In 1974, he joined Ken Elliot's Seventh Wave, a pioneer synthesiser-based rock band, appearing on their second album, Psi-Fi.

In 1975, he joined Ginger Baker, Mr Snips, and The Gurvitz brothers in the Baker Gurvitz Army - recording Elysian Encounter .

In 1976, he joined Jan Dukes de Grey briefly to record their final album, Strange Terrain. Although the album was recorded in 1976, it was only released in 2010.

In 1979, Lemer joined Mike Oldfield's fifty-piece touring band as one of two keyboard players. This led to him guesting on Moerlen's album Time is the Key.

Lemer has done much recent work with the band In Cahoots. With them, he played on the album Cutting Both Ways (1987) and toured Europe. He joined the band Paraphernalia in 1987 and played on the albums A Cry from the Heart (1987), Everlasting Flame (1993) and Shifting Sands.

Lemer subsequently worked with In Cahoots again. He played on the album Digging In (1991) and rejoined the band permanently in 1995. After two In Cahoots tours, Lemer devoted 1999 to touring with Paraphernalia in support of the album they had recently released. Paraphernalia is not currently touring while Barbara Thompson is fighting Parkinson's Disease.

Lemer's most recent albums include Players of Games recorded with Billy Thompson, Looking for Soup, All That with In Cahoots, and Never Say Goodbye recorded with Paraphernalia.

== Present ==
He is now coaching piano, improvisation, music technology. He also plays with the Spanish Harlow Orchestra.

He is also actively involved in lobbying to end global hunger and participates as Group Leader with Results UK, the premier UK citizen advocacy group to eradicate poverty globally.
