= Hurt by Love =

Hurt by Love may refer to:

- "Hurt by Love", 1996 song by BoDeans from Blend
- "Hurt by Love", 1977 song by Chris Spedding from The Very Best of Chris Spedding
- "Hurt by Love", 1964 song by Downliners Sect from The Sect
- "Hurt by Love", 1964 song by Inez Foxx
- "Hurt by Love", 1978 song by Nicol & Marsh
- "Hurt by Love", 2005 song by Terri Walker from L.O.V.E
- "Hurt by Love", song by the Clarendonians
