= Journal of a Contract Killer =

- Directed by: Tony Maylam
- Written by: Tony Maylam
- Produced by: Michele Damiano
- Starring: Justine Powell; Adam Leese; Jake Canuso; Marco Gambino; Heather Bleasdale; Isabella Damiano
- Cinematography: David Griffiths
- Edited by: Francis Molony
- Music by: Andrew Fisher; Stephen W. Parsons
- Production company: MJ Films
- Distributed by: Fabrication Films
- Release date: 1 March 2008 (U.S.)
- Running time: 90 minutes
- Country: United Kingdom
- Language: English

Journal of a Contract Killer is a 2008 film directed by Tony Maylam.

== Plot ==
Stephanie Komack was a big-class hooker and assassin for the Italian Mob. She now was working in London as a waitress, and a single mother to her seven-year-old daughter, the Mob tracks Stephanie down and persuade her to do one final job. That when the hit goes wrong and Stephanie soon realises the reality of her failure. They snatch her daughter as punishment, but didn't figure on Stephanie's capacity for revenge.
