= Hero (1987 film) =

- Hero DVD/VHS Cover
- Directed by: Tony Maylam
- Written by: Tony Maylam
- Produced by: Drummond Challis; Lee Stern
- Narrated by: Michael Caine
- Music by: Rick Wakeman
- Release date: 2 July 1987
- Running time: 86 minutes
- Country: United Kingdom
- Language: English

Hero (1987) is the official documentary film of the 1986 FIFA World Cup held in Mexico. The film was narrated by Michael Caine and the music score was written by Rick Wakeman. It focuses on the major matches of the 1986 World Cup, focusing on the background of the important players, their contributions to the team, and the major moments that occurred throughout the tournament.

Hero found the most success in Argentina since the focal point of the film was Diego Maradona and his role in the quarter-final match against England, more specifically the Hand of God goal and the Goal of the Century. The match and the championship were eventually won by Argentina. The film also enjoys cult status in the UK.

== Highlighted players ==
- (Argentina) Diego Maradona
- (Denmark) Preben Elkjær
- (Uruguay) Enzo Francescoli
- (France) Michel Platini
- (England) Gary Lineker
- (West Germany) Karl-Heinz Rummenigge
- (Spain) Emilio Butragueño
- (Brazil) Sócrates
- (Denmark) Michael Laudrup
- (Mexico) Hugo Sánchez

== Distribution ==
- West Germany: 2 July 1987
- Italy: 7 June 1990 (TV premiere)
- Worldwide: 27 November 2020 (FIFATV YouTube channel)
