= Three Man Army =

British hard rock band

Three Man Army was a British hard rock band active in the first half of the 1970s.

== History ==
The group was formed by Adrian Gurvitz and Paul Gurvitz, formerly of the Gun. Following that band's dissolution, Adrian played with Buddy Miles and Paul played with Parrish & Gurvitz, then reunited as Three Man Army. Their debut album, A Third of a Lifetime, featured both Buddy Miles, as well as Mike Kellie (from Spooky Tooth). Tony Newman, who had previously played with Sounds Incorporated and Jeff Beck, joined for the group's next two albums, and a fourth album was recorded but not released until 2005. Newman then left to play with David Bowie, and the Gurvitzes united with Ginger Baker as the Baker Gurvitz Army.

== Discography ==
=== A Third of a Lifetime (Pegasus Records, 1971) ===
Track Listing

1. "Butter Queen" - (Adrian Gurvitz, Keith Ellis) - 5:23
2. "Daze" - (Adrian Curtis, Lou Reizner) - 4:02
3. "Another Way" - (Adrian Gurvitz) - 6:49
4. "A Third of a Lifetime" - (Adrian Gurvitz) - 4:29
5. "Nice One" - (Adrian Gurvitz) - 4:10
6. "Three Man Army" - (Adrian Gurvitz) - 5:05
7. "Agent Man" - (Adrian Gurvitz) - 5:36
8. "See What I Took" - (Adrian Gurvitz) - 3:31
9. "Midnight" - (Adrian Gurvitz) - 5:23
10. "Together" - (Adrian Gurvitz) - 6:34

Bonus tracks

11. "What's Your Name (Single Version)" - (Adrian Gurvitz, Lee Baxter Hayes) - 3:31
12. "Travellin'" - (Adrian Gurvitz) - 4:00

Personnel

- Adrian Gurvitz - guitar, vocals, organ, Mellotron
- Paul Gurvitz - bass & vocals
- Mike Kellie - drums (all but 1)
- Buddy Miles - drums (1), organ (9)

=== Mahesha (issued in the US as Three Man Army) (Reprise/Polydor, 1973) ===
Track Listing

all tracks written by Adrian Gurvitz, except where noted.

1. "My Yiddishe Mamma" - (Jack Yellen, Lew Pollack) - 2:06
2. "Hold On - 3:43
3. "Come on Down To Earth - 3:54
4. "Take Me Down From The Mountain - 2:58
5. "Woman - 2:50
6. "Mahesha - 5:05
7. "Take A Look at the Light - 2:54
8. "Can I Leave The Summer - 4:02
9. "The Trip - 6:03

Personnel

- Adrian Gurvitz - guitar, vocals, keyboards
- Paul Gurvitz - bass, vocals
- Tony Newman - drums

=== Three Man Army Two (Reprise/Polydor, June 1974) ===
Track Listing

1. "Polecat Woman" - (Adrian Gurvitz, Lee Baxter Hayes) - 3:54
2. "Today" - (Adrian Gurvitz) - 6:19
3. "Flying" - (Adrian Gurvitz) - 3:08
4. "Space Is The Place" - (Adrian Gurvitz) - 6:20
5. "Irving" - (Adrian Gurvitz, Paul Gurvitz, Tony Newman) - 4:18
6. "I Can't Make The Blind See" - (Adrian Gurvitz, Lee Baxter Hayes) - 4:03
7. "Burning Angel" - (Adrian Gurvitz, Paul Gurvitz, Tony Newman) - 3:34
8. "In My Eyes" - (Adrian Gurvitz, Lee Baxter Hayes) - 5:07

Personnel

- Adrian Gurvitz - electric and slide guitars, vocals, organ
- Paul Gurvitz - bass, vocals, acoustic guitar
- Tony Newman - drums
- Peter Robinson - piano (4, 6)
- Doris Troy - backing vocals (6)
- Madelin Bell - backing vocals (6)
- Ruby James - backing vocals (6)

=== Three Man Army 3 (Revisited Records, SPV 304222CD - Recorded 1973–4 released 2005) ===
1. Three Days to Go 4:26
2. Dog's Life 2:56
3. Jubilee 4:34
4. Look at the Sun 3:18
5. Don't Wanna Go Right Now 5:21
6. Come to the Party 2:28
7. Let's Go Get Laid 3:52
8. Doctor 2:42
9. You'll Find Love 3:26
