= Adrian Gurvitz =

English musician (born 1949)

- Also known as: Adrian Curtis
- Born: Adrian Israel Gurvitz; 26 June 1949 (age 77); Stoke Newington, North London
- Genres: Rock, pop rock, soft rock, psychedelic rock, hard rock, blues rock
- Occupations: Singer-songwriter, musician, producer
- Instruments: Guitar, piano
- Years active: 1967–present
- Labels: Jet, RAK, EMI, Geffen, Playfull
- Formerly of: The Gun, Three Man Army, Baker Gurvitz Army

Adrian Israel Gurvitz (/ˈɡɜːrvɪts/; born 26 June 1949) is an English singer, songwriter, musician and record producer. His prolific songwriting ability has gained him hits with Eddie Money's No. 1 Billboard Mainstream Rock hit "The Love in Your Eyes" and with his own song "Classic", a No. 8 UK hit single, as well as the top 10 UK Rock Chart single "Race with the Devil", with his band Gun. He also co-wrote the track "Even If My Heart Would Break" from the Grammy Award-winning soundtrack The Bodyguard. His early bands Gun, Three Man Army and the Baker Gurvitz Army were major influences to the first wave of the British hard rock circuit. Gurvitz also gained notability as a lead guitarist, known for his intricate, hard-driving solos. Gurvitz was placed at No. 9 by Chris Welch of Melody Maker’s "Best Guitarists in the World" list.

== Early life ==
Gurvitz's father was the tour manager for Cliff Richard and the Shadows and the Kinks. Adrian started playing guitar at the age of eight and by age 15, he was touring in early bands like Screaming Lord Sutch, Billie Davis, and Crispian St. Peters. In 1967, he and his band Rupert's People, released the single "Reflections of Charles Brown" on Columbia Records. The song charted on the Australian pop charts at No. 13 in August 1967. It only just failed to reach the main chart in the UK, being listed as a "breaker" underneath the chart for three weeks in August 1967. (He was known by the surname Curtis until the early 1970s after which he returned to his original name Gurvitz).

== Career ==
As the lead guitarist and singer of the band the Gun, Gurvitz had his first major hit with "Race with the Devil" at age 18. Issued as a single in October 1968, it reached the top 10 on the UK Singles Chart and, in March 1969, it also became a big hit in many European countries. Jimi Hendrix quoted the song's riff during his song "Machine Gun" at the Isle of Wight Festival in 1970. "Race with the Devil" has been covered by Judas Priest (on the remastered CD version of Sin After Sin), Black Oak Arkansas (on the album Race with the Devil), Girlschool (on the album Demolition), and Church of Misery (on their 1996 demo, released as a split album with Acrimony, and on their full-length LP Vol. 1). Their debut album artwork cover is noteworthy as it was Roger Dean's first. After their second album, ''Gunsight, the band disbanded.

Not long after the Gun disbanded, Gurvitz began work on his first solo album, which turned into Three Man Army's debut album, A Third of a Lifetime. Three Man Army were signed to Reprise and Warner Bros. Records. The debut album featured several drummers, including Band of Gypsys drummer Buddy Miles.

Shortly after Jimi Hendrix's death, Miles invited Gurvitz to join his band, the Buddy Miles Express, on its US tour. The tour lasted for two solid years and they played in front of 50,000 people a night. On tour, Gurvitz contributed to Miles' 1973 album Chapter VII. It was during this tour that Gurvitz met Ginger Baker, drummer for Cream.

Gurvitz returned to the UK from his tour with Buddy Miles and met back up with his brother and Three Man Army bandmate Paul Gurvitz. Tony Newman, who had previously played with Sounds Incorporated and Rod Stewart, joined for the group's next two albums, Mahesha and Three Man Army Three. At the end of the third album, he teamed up to form the Baker Gurvitz Army with Ginger Baker.

The Baker Gurvitz Army signed to Vertigo Records in the UK and signed with Atlantic in the United States. Their album, Baker Gurvitz Army went gold, peaked at No. 22 on the UK Albums Chart and also entered the US Billboard 200 chart. They went on to produce two more gold albums together, Elysian Encounter (1975) and Hearts on Fire (1976).

Gurvitz was asked by drummer Graeme Edge of the Moody Blues to join his band, the Graeme Edge Band. He wanted Gurvitz to help write, sing and produce his next two albums, Kick Off Your Muddy Boots and Paradise Ballroom, which both charted in the US. The albums were released by Threshold and the cover illustrations were by Joe Petagno.

In 1979, Gurvitz went solo and recorded two albums with Jet Records. He recorded Sweet Vendetta with US studio musicians Jeff, Joe and Steve Porcaro, and David Paich who started the band Toto two years earlier. He later issued Il Assassino in 1980. After his deal with Jet Records ended, he signed with EMI/Rak in Europe and Geffen Records in the US. There he released his third album, Classic. Gurvitz reached success with the song "Classic", reaching No. 8 on the UK Singles Chart. "Classic" was one of the most played ballads in England in 1982. The follow-up single was "Your Dream".

During this time, Gurvitz wrote for Mickie Most's publishing company Rak Music Publishing. There, Gurvitz wrote songs for Earle Brown, Hot Chocolate, and in 1982 he wrote the England World Cup Squad song "England, We'll Fly the Flag" which was on the AA-side of "This Time (We'll Get It Right)", which hit No. 2 on the UK Singles Chart.

Gurvitz moved to the States and wrote Eddie Money's hit, "The Love in Your Eyes". It reached number 24 on the Billboard Hot 100 and number one on the Billboard Mainstream Rock Tracks chart. Gurvitz signed to Warner Chappell Music, where he wrote tracks for artists like Steve Perry, REO Speedwagon and Chicago. In 1992, he wrote "Even If My Heart Would Break", recorded by Aaron Neville and Kenny G. The song appeared in the film The Bodyguard and on its soundtrack album. The Bodyguard's soundtrack is one of the best-selling soundtrack albums of all time. It won a Grammy for Best Album of the Year in 1994 and has sold over 45 million copies worldwide. Also, Kenny G included the song on his platinum album Breathless.

In 2000, Gurvitz formed an American-British pop girl group, No Secrets. One of the members of the group was his daughter, Carly Lewis. They signed to Jive Records and their song, "Kids in America" peaked at No. 1 on the Billboard Heatseekers chart. It was also featured on the Jimmy Neutron movie soundtrack. No Secrets joined Aaron Carter in Toronto for the shooting of his video for "Oh Aaron", and they also collaborated in the taping of the song, providing background vocals. Gurvitz was hired by Walt Disney Records to produce and write songs for many of their in-house pop stars such as Jesse McCartney, Cheetah Girls and Anne Hathaway. He produced many of the Disneymania soundtracks, which landed him three gold albums.

In 2011, Gurvitz produced the song "Stevie on the Radio" for Pixie Lott featuring Stevie Wonder on the album Young Foolish Happy. The album went gold in the UK.

Most recently, Gurvitz has worked with Ziggy Marley and Andra Day, among others and as an executive at Buskin Records, which he founded alongside Jeffrey Evans, and with Warner Bros. Records in which Buskin has a partnership deal.

== Discography ==
=== Albums ===
Solo

- Sweet Vendetta (1979, Jet)
- The Way I Feel (1979, Jet)
- Il Assassino (1980, Jet)
- Classic (1982, RAK/ Geffen)
- Acoustic Heart (1996, Playfull)
- No Compromise (2000, Playfull)
- Classic Songs (Compilation) (2000, Playfull)
- Blood Sweat & Years (2024, Gurlou)

Bands

The Gun

- Gun (CBS, 1968)
- Gun Sight (CBS, 1969)

Three Man Army

- A Third of a Lifetime (One Way Records, 1971)
- Mahesha (issued in the US as Three Man Army) (Reprise/Polydor, 1973)
- Three Man Army Two (Reprise/Polydor, 1974)
- Three Man Army 3 (Revisited Records, SPV 304222CD – Recorded 1973–4 released 2005)

The Baker Gurvitz Army

- Baker Gurvitz Army (Vertigo/Atlantic, 1974)
- Elysian Encounter (Atco/Vertigo, 1975)
- Hearts of Fire (Repertoire/Vertigo, 1976)

The Graeme Edge Band, featuring Adrian Gurvtiz

- Kick Off Your Muddy Boots (Threshold, 1975)
- Paradise Ballroom (London/Decca, 1977)

=== Singles ===
- "Untouchable and Free" (1979)
- "The Way I Feel" (1979)
- "She's in Command" (1979)
- "Classic" (1982) UK No. 8, AUS No. 12
- "Your Dream" (1982) UK No. 61
- "Clown" (1982)
- "Corner of Love" (1983)
- "Hello Mum" (1983)

=== Songwriting credits/album appearances ===
- The England World Cup Squad - "England, We'll Fly The Flag" (1982)
- Hot Chocolate – Love Shot ("I'm Sorry", "Friend of Mine") (1983)
- Eddie Money – "The Love in Your Eyes" (1989) No. 24 on the Billboard Hot 100 and No. 1 Billboard's Mainstream Rock Tracks chart
- REO Speedwagon – The Second Decade of Rock and Roll 1981 to 1991 ("All Heaven Broke Loose") (1991)
- Henry Lee Summer – Way Past Midnight ("So Desperately") (1991)
- The Bodyguard Soundtrack – Kenny G and Aaron Neville – "Even if My Heart Would Break" (1992)
- Kenny G – Breathless ("Even if My Heart Would Break") (1992)
- Steve Perry – "It Won't Be You" (B-side to "Missing You" single) (1994)
- Various Artists – Überdosis G'fühl 2 ("Classic") (1997)
- Youssou N’Dour – Joko: From Village To Town ("My Hope is in You") (1999)
- CeCe Winans – self-titled album ("More Than What I Wanted", "Looking Back at You") (2001) US Top Gospel Album No. 2
- Bent – Their song "Magic Love" (2002) samples "The Way I Feel"
- No Secrets – No Secrets ("Hot", "I Know What I Want", "No Secrets") (2002)
- CeCe Winans – Throne Room (2003) US Top Gospel Album No. 1
- Bob Sinclar – Born in 69 ("The Way I Feel") (2009)
- Pixie Lott featuring Stevie Wonder – Young Foolish Happy ("Stevie on the Radio") (2011)
- Emii featuring Snoop Dogg – "Mr. Romeo" (2011)
- Andra Day – Cheers to the Fall (2015)
- Transviolet – Transviolet EP (2015)

== Albums/singles and songwriting achievements ==
This section shows the chart appearances and sales certifications of Gurvitz' work with bands he's been a member of, his solo work and albums/singles by other artists in which he has contributed as songwriter.

Artist	Album/single	Achievements	Year released
Rupert's People	"Reflections of Charles Brown"	UK Top 40, Australian No. 13	1967
The Gun	"Race with the Devil"	UK Top 10 chart, European Top Charts No. 1	1967
Baker Gurvitz Army	Baker Gurvitz Army	UK Top 20 chart, US Billboard charts, US: Gold	1974
Baker Gurvitz Army	Elysian Encounter	US Billboard charts, US: Gold	1975
Baker Gurvitz Army	Heart of Fire	US Billboard charts, US: Gold	1976
The Graeme Edge Band	Kick Off Your Muddy Boots	US Billboard Top 100 charts	1975
The Graeme Edge Band	Paradise Ballroom	US Billboard Top 100 charts	1977
Adrian Gurvitz	"Sweet Vendetta"	Japan: Smash hit	1979
Adrian Gurvitz	"Classic"	UK and European charts No. 8	1982
The England World Cup Squad	"This Time (We'll Get It Right)"	No. 1 UK chart, UK: Gold	1982
Eddie Money	"The Love in Your Eyes"	No. 24 Billboard Hot 100, No. 1 Billboard Mainstream Rock Tracks chart, US: Gold	1989
Kenny G and Aaron Neville	The Bodyguard: Soundtrack	No. 1 Selling Soundtrack of All Time, Grammy Album of the Year, WW: 45× Platinum	1992
Kenny G	Breathless	No. 1 Billboard, US: 18× Platinum	1992
Steve Perry	"Missing You"	No. 74 Billboard Hot 100, US: Gold	1994
Stevie Nicks	Party of Five Soundtrack – "Free Fallin'"	US: Gold	1996
Youssou N’Dour	"My Hope Is in You"	UK: Gold	1999
CeCe Winans	Throne Room	US Top Gospel Album No. 2	2001
Various Artists	Jimmy Neutron Soundtrack	Billboard 200 No. 6, US: Gold	2001
No Secrets	No Secrets	No. 1 Heatseekers Billboard Chart	2002
Various Artists	Disneymania	Billboard 200 No. 52, US: Gold	2002
Various Artists	Disneymania 2	Billboard 200 No. 29, US: Gold	2004
Various Artists	Disneymania 3	Billboard 200 No. 30, US: Gold	2005
Pixie Lott	Young Foolish Happy – "Stevie on the Radio" featuring Stevie Wonder	UK: Gold	2011
Emii	"Mr. Romeo" featuring Snoop Dogg	Top 20 Billboard chart	2012
Emii	"Time to Move On"	Music Week UK Commercial POP Club Chart No. 4, No. 9 Upfront Club Chart	2013
Andra Day	"Rise Up"	Billboard 200 No. 61	2015

== See also ==
- Hard rock
- Blues rock
- Adult contemporary music
