= Split Second (1992 film) =

1992 science fiction horror film by Tony Maylam

- Video release poster
- Directed by: Tony Maylam
- Written by: Gary Scott Thompson
- Produced by: Laura Gregory
- Starring: Rutger Hauer; Kim Cattrall; Neil Duncan; Michael J. Pollard
- Cinematography: Clive Tickner
- Edited by: Dan Rae
- Music by: Francis Haines; Stephen W. Parsons
- Production companies: Muse Productions; Challenge Films
- Distributed by: InterStar (US)
- Release date: 1 May 1992 (United States)
- Running time: 90 minutes
- Countries: United Kingdom; United States
- Language: English
- Budget: £2.5 million
- Box office: $6 million (UK/US)

Split Second is a 1992 dystopian buddy cop science fiction action horror film directed by Tony Maylam and Ian Sharp, and written by Gary Scott Thompson. A co-production between the United States and the United Kingdom, the film stars Rutger Hauer as a burnt-out police detective obsessively hunting down the mysterious serial killer who killed his partner several years prior. The film also features Kim Cattrall, Alastair Neil Duncan, Pete Postlethwaite, Ian Dury, and Alun Armstrong.

== Plot ==
In the year 2008, global warming and heavy rainfall has left large areas of London flooded. Rookie police officer Dick Durkin is assigned to partner with Harley Stone, a burnt-out and cynical veteran homicide detective. According to his commanding officer, Stone survives on "anxiety, coffee, and chocolate" after being wounded while failing to prevent the death of his partner Foster by a serial killer three years previously. Now, the murders have begun again and Stone is obsessed with the case. An Oxford-educated psychologist, Durkin is ordered to stick with Stone at all times and report any unstable behaviour. After investigating the scenes of several killings, they appear no closer to identifying the killer, although Stone seems to share some sort of psychic connection with him. Their only clues are that the murders seem to be linked with the lunar cycle, and that the killer takes an organ from each victim, apparently to eat them. Lab analysis of blood left during one encounter shows that the killer possesses multiple recombinant DNA strands, somehow having absorbed the DNA of its victims. Complicating matters is the return of Michelle, Foster's wife, with whom Stone had an affair.

While attempting to figure out the killer's motives and pattern, Stone and Durkin begin to bond as Durkin loosens up and starts to understand Stone. Durkin hypothesises that the killer is taunting Stone personally, following him and then killing someone at each location; Stone acquired a psychic link with the killer via the wound it dealt him. The killer then attacks a woman in Stone's apartment building, afterward kidnapping Michelle while the two detectives are downstairs. They track the killer deep into the flooded tunnels of the London Underground subway system and discover the truth: the killer is not human but a large, horrific and possibly demonic creature that is fast, savage, and bloodthirsty. Durkin figures out that Stone escaped from it ten years ago, and it is now fixated upon killing Stone, just as it previously killed Foster; each killing and "appearance" of the monster is an attempt to lure Stone closer and closer.

Finally learning where the creature makes its lair, Stone and Durkin head to the area, armed to the teeth and relying on Stone to find the monster just as it always finds him. They emerge into an abandoned underground train station to find Michelle suspended over the water as obvious bait. Stone frees her anyway, prompting the creature's appearance. During the fight, Durkin wounds the creature's chest, allowing Stone to pull the monster's heart out and kill it. However, as the three of them leave the station, bubbles of air are seen breaking the surface of the water, suggesting that there may be more than one monster.

== Cast ==
- Rutger Hauer as Harley Stone
- Kim Cattrall as Michelle McLaine
- Neil Duncan as Dick Durkin
- Michael J. Pollard as 'The Rat Catcher'
- Alun Armstrong as 'Thrasher'
- Pete Postlethwaite as Paulsen
- Ian Dury as Jay 'Jay-Jay'
- Roberta Eaton as Robin
- Tony Steedman as O'Donnell
- Steven Hartley as Foster McLaine
- Sara Stockbridge as Tiffany
- Daimon Richardson Army Soldier

== Production ==
Screenwriter Gary Scott Thompson wrote the original script titled Pentagram in 1988. Laura Gregory, producer and head of Challenge Films and production manager Susan Nicoletti discovered the script and thought it had great potential. They hired Tony Maylam to direct the film but wanted Thompson to make some changes to the script. His script was an action, horror and buddy cop film with occult overtones which took place in modern Los Angeles. The film included a ritualistic serial killer who had committed five murders every five years for the last quarter of the century and always leaves pentagram symbols after each death. One of the reasons why changes were demanded is because the script was considered to be too similar to another horror thriller which came out around the same time, The First Power (1990). Thompson changed the script during re-writes and his new version, titled Black Tide, was very close to the final film. It was set in a futuristic London which became flooded due to the effects of global warming. This new version of the script was sent to Rutger Hauer who loved it and agreed to star in the film. Though Thompson originally wrote the script with Harrison Ford in mind for the main role, he was happy that Hauer was cast as the lead.

During production, the script was changed several times; there were many discussions about what the main villain/creature should look like and what it would be, which left Stephen Norrington with three weeks to design the creature. The ending was also changed several times; Thompson re-writing it during filming. Hauer told him to re-write the script to make it more physical and with more focus on the psychic link that his character has with the creature. Due to all the stress during production, Maylam stepped back from finishing the film, so Ian Sharp and others involved in the film joined up to finish it. Sharp directed the finale which takes place in a flooded subway along with some other additional scenes and is credited as co-director in the ending credits. The movie was filmed in eight weeks, between June 17 and August 9 of 1991 and was widely released in April 1992.

Wendy Carlos, who composed the scores for A Clockwork Orange (1971), The Shining (1980), and Tron (1982), was hired to compose the score for Split Second but her score was rejected and replaced with a new soundtrack by Francis Haines and Stephen W. Parsons. Two tracks from Carlos' rejected score were included on her compilation album Rediscovering Lost Scores, Volume 2; both tracks were going to be used in the morgue scene.

Some scenes were deleted, a Japanese VHS version included two of the deleted scenes. In the first one, Stone and Durkin go to Durkin's apartment where they talk with his girlfriend Robin (played by actress Roberta Eaton, who is still credited in the film even though her scene was deleted). The second deleted scene features more dialogue between Stone and Durkin at the same time as the "monster" is killing a jogger and ripping his heart out. Stone and Durkin find the man's corpse afterward. These extra scenes are included as bonus features on the Blu-ray of the film released by 101 Films.

== Release ==
Split Second was theatrically released in the United States on May 1, 1992. Its home video release was in September 2 of that year. Although it was re-titled again sometime during production from Black Tide to Split Second, the movie had different titles in other countries, like Killer Instinct (in France) and Detective Stone (in Italy). Despite an exciting ad campaign and good word of mouth, the movie underperformed at the box office because it was released during the Los Angeles riots.

== Reception ==
Lawrence Cohn of Variety wrote, "Split Second is an extremely stupid monster film, boasting enough violence and special effects to satisfy less-discriminating vid fans." Chris Willman of the Los Angeles Times wrote, "It's hard to think of a less satisfying creature feature in recent memory than the simply terrible Split Second." Stephen Holden of The New York Times called it "fairly dull". Doug Brod of Entertainment Weekly called it "utterly soulless and imitative". In Time Out London, Nigel Floyd wrote, "This derivative eco-horror movie recycles dozens of disposable plots". However, largely due to the film's "unintentionally hilarious" nature and performances by the well-respected cast, the film has since developed a cult following.

The film grossed £375,000 in the United Kingdom. In the United States and Canada it grossed $5.4 million.

== Legacy ==
Belgian grindcore band Aborted used an image from the film for the cover of their first album, The Purity of Perversion (1999).
