= Genesis: In Concert =

- Directed by: Tony Maylam
- Produced by: Tony Maylam
- Starring: Tony Banks; Mike Rutherford; Steve Hackett; Phil Collins; Bill Bruford
- Music by: Genesis
- Production company: Worldmark-Samuelson International Productions
- Distributed by: EMI Film Distributors; Miramax
- Release date: 31 January 1977
- Running time: 45 minutes
- Language: English

Genesis: In Concert is a 1977 concert film directed and produced by Tony Maylam for the English progressive rock band Genesis. The recording of the film took place during concerts in Glasgow, Scotland and Stafford, England in 1976.

== Background ==
Genesis: In Concert documents the concert tour that Genesis embarked on in 1976, after their album A Trick of the Tail. This was the first album on which Phil Collins assumed the duties of lead vocalist (following the departure of Peter Gabriel). On the album, Collins sings lead vocals and plays drums. But since Collins wanted to focus on his singing duties during live shows, Genesis brought in former Yes and King Crimson drummer Bill Bruford to play drums and percussion during this tour; however, Collins still played drums onstage for extended instrumental sections, codas or introductions of songs and instrumental compositions and he would often play percussion, notably tambourine, as well.

The film premiered on 31 January 1977 at the ABC1 Cinema on Shaftesbury Avenue as a double bill with Maylam's other rock concert film, White Rock, with Princess Anne and Captain Mark Phillips in the audience. Its US premiere was held on 31 October 1977 at the Magno Screening Room in the MGM Building, New York City.

== Content ==
The movie combines film of two shows: one at the Apollo Theatre in Glasgow, Scotland on 9 July 1976, and one at Bingley Hall in Staffordshire, England on 10 July 1976.

During the songs "The Cinema Show," "Entangled," and "Supper's Ready," the footage of the concert cuts to other sequences, often in an abstract manner. These portions of the movie were shown on screens behind the band during the tour from which this movie was made.

The silent movie shown during the playing of "The Cinema Show" is a 1910 Italian silent comedy film, La nuova insegna dell'albergo del Globo (The New Sign for the Globe Hotel).

== Song list ==
1. "I Know What I Like (In Your Wardrobe)" (includes a snippet of "Stagnation")
2. "Fly on a Windshield" (Instrumental section)
3. "Broadway Melody of 1974" (Instrumental version)
4. "The Carpet Crawlers"
5. "The Cinema Show" (Instrumental section)
6. "Entangled"
7. "Supper's Ready" (Apocalypse in 9/8 / As Sure As Eggs Is Eggs)
8. "Los Endos"

== Musicians ==
- Tony Banks – keyboards, guitar, backing vocals
- Mike Rutherford – bass, guitar, backing vocals
- Steve Hackett – guitar
- Phil Collins – vocals, drums, percussion

with

- Bill Bruford – drums, percussion

== Home video ==
The film was released on VHS and laserdisc in Japan in 1994.

The 2007 reissue of A Trick of the Tail includes Genesis: In Concert as a feature on a bonus DVD.

The film was taken from the videotape master used for the laserdisc instead of a fresh transfer from film elements. Possibly as a result of reusing the laserdisc release's master, the DVD's audio and video are sped up to the PAL framerate (25 fps, when the original film elements may have been shot at 24 fps) and the pitch of the soundtrack is not corrected for the 4.167% increase in playback speed.

== Sources ==
- Bowler, Dave; Dray, Bryan (1992). Genesis – A Biography. Sidgwick & Jackson. ISBN 978-0-283-06132-5.
