= Enemy Within (album) =

1986 album by Chris Spedding

- 1986 New Rose LP (FRA)

Studio album by Chris Spedding
- Released: October 1986
- Recorded: 1982–1985
- Studio: Various: Mediasound; Intergalactic Studios; Skyline Studios
- Genre: Roots rock; pop rock
- Label: New Rose (France); Date (Germany)
- Producer: Chris Spedding

Chris Spedding chronology
Friday the 13th (1981)	Enemy Within (1986)	Cafe Days (1990)

Alternative cover
- 2009 Other Peoples Music CD

Enemy Within is the seventh solo studio album by English singer-songwriter and guitarist Chris Spedding. The album was originally released in October 1986, on the label New Rose Records in France, and in Germany on Date Records. The album was recorded over a period of three years starting in 1982, at three different recording studios. It was the six-year follow-up to his 1980 album I'm Not Like Everybody Else. The album features contributions from Tom Finn, Anton Fig, Jimmy Zoppi, David Van Tieghem, and Keith Lentin. The album was his last recording of original material for four years, until he released Cafe Days, in 1990.

When the album was released in late 1986, it received mixed reviews, and went largely unnoticed by the public, being a commercial disappointment, and even missed the album charts worldwide, alike all of his solo albums (to date).

It was later picked up for release by Repertoire Records in 2001, featuring rare bonus content. With the original album digitally remastered from the original 1/2" mix tapes; the bonus content consists of one outtake, and one live track.

== Critical reception ==
Professional ratings
Retrospective review
Review scores
Source	Rating
AllMusic	2.5/5 stars

=== Retrospective review ===
Enemy Within received mixed reviews from contemporary music critics. In his retrospective review for AllMusic, Mike DeGagne rated the album two and a half stars out of five. He praised the album for containing "enough fragments of mild rockabilly, pop, and traditional rock & roll." They also added that that made him sound "an awful lot like Mark Knopfler". However, they commented that "Spedding fails to unleash any real surprises"

== Track listing ==
All tracks composed by Chris Spedding; except where indicated.

Side one
No.	Title	Writer(s)	Length
1.	"Hologram"	Spedding, Marshall Crenshaw	3:25
2.	"Love's Made a Fool of You"	Buddy Holly, Bob Montgomery	4:03
3.	"Signs Of Love"		2:19
4.	"Street Walkin'"		3:20
5.	"Enemy Within"		3:22

Side two
No.	Title	Writer(s)	Length
6.	"Hi-Heel Shoes"		2:16
7.	"Counterfeit"		2:52
8.	"Girl"		2:40
9.	"American Dream"		3:07
10.	"Go West"	Spedding, John Cale, Jody Beach	3:40
11.	"Shakin' All Over"	Johnny Kidd, Guy Robinson	2:36

Additional tracks

Bonus tracks on compact disc release
No.	Title	Length
12.	"Lied to Me"	2:46
13.	"Mary Lou" (Live)	5:46

== Personnel ==
Credits are adapted from the album's liner notes.

- Chris Spedding - lead vocals; lead guitars; bass guitars; Casio synthesizer
- Anton Fig - drums; percussion
- Carter Cathcart - bass guitar; keyboards
- Amanda Blue - backing vocals

Additional musicians

- Keith Lentin - bass guitar and backing vocals on "Hologram"
- Cedric Samson - backing vocals on "Hologram"
- Diane Murray - backing vocals on "Hologram"
- David Van Tieghem - drums on "Go West"
- Dave Lebolt - keyboards on "Go West"
- Chris Bishop - bass guitar and backing vocals on "Go West"
- Tom Finn - backing vocals on "Go West"
