= Classic (Adrian Gurvitz song) =

1982 single by Adrian Gurvitz

Single by Adrian Gurvitz

from the album Classic
- Released: 1982
- Recorded: 1981
- Genre: Soft rock
- Length: 4:55 (album version); 3:39 (single version)
- Label: Rak
- Songwriter: Adrian Gurvitz
- Producers: Adrian Gurvitz, Paul Gurvitz

"Classic" is a song by British singer-songwriter Adrian Gurvitz. It was released as a single in early 1982 and is the title track of his 1982 album Classic. The song was a hit in his native UK, peaking at No. 8 on the UK Singles Chart as well as reaching No. 12 in Australia.

It was one of the most played ballads in England in 1982.

== Charts ==
=== Weekly charts ===
Weekly chart performance for "Classic"
| Chart (1982) | Position |
|---|---|
| Australia (Kent Music Report) | 12 |
| United Kingdom (OCC) | 8 |

=== Year-end charts ===
Year-end chart performance for "Classic"
| Chart (1982) | Position |
|---|---|
| Australia (Kent Music Report) | 47 |
