= Hearts on Fire (Baker Gurvitz Army album) =

Studio album by Baker Gurvitz Army
- Released: 1976
- Studios: The Point, London
- Genre: Rock
- Length: 37:20
- Labels: Repertoire Records (U.S.A.); Vertigo Records (Europe)
- Producer: Eddy Offord

Baker Gurvitz Army chronology
Elysian Encounter (1975)	Hearts on Fire (1976)

Professional ratings
Review scores
Source	Rating
Allmusic	3/5 stars

Hearts on Fire is Baker Gurvitz Army's third and final studio album, released in 1976.

== Track listing ==
1. "Hearts on Fire" (Ginger Baker) – 2:32
2. "Neon Lights" (Mr. Snips) – 4:38
3. "Smiling" (Paul Gurvitz) – 3:16
4. "Tracks of My Life" (Adrian Gurvitz) – 4:30
5. "Flying in and Out of Stardom" (A. Gurvitz) – 2:21
6. "Dancing the Night Away" (A. Gurvitz) – 3:26
7. "My Mind Is Healing" (A. Gurvitz) 3:54
8. "Thirsty for the Blues" (A. Gurvitz) – 5:18
9. "Night People" (A. Gurvitz) – 3:21
10. "Mystery" (Snips) – 4:04

== Personnel ==
=== Baker Gurvitz Army ===
- Ginger Baker – drums, percussion, vocals
- Adrian Gurvitz – guitar, vocals
- Paul Gurvitz – bass, vocals
- Mr. Snips – vocals

with

- Madeline Bell, Irene Chanter, Kay Garner – backing vocals on track 5
- Brian Chatton – clavinet, mini moog on track 3
- Ken Freeman – synthesizer strings on tracks 2, 5, 6
- Ann O'Dell – piano on track 4, 8, Hammond organ on track 3, 7

=== Technical ===
- Produced by Eddy Offord
- Mixed at Advision Studios
