= The Very Best of Chris Spedding =

Greatest hits album by Chris Spedding
- Released: 5 September 2005
- Genre: Pub rock, roots rock, rock & roll, power pop, punk rock
- Length: 1:17:44
- Label: EMI Gold

Chris Spedding chronology
Gesundheit! (1995)	The Very Best of Chris Spedding (2005)	Click Clack (2005)

The Very Best of Chris Spedding is the fifth greatest hits compilation album by the English guitarist Chris Spedding, released on 5 September 2005. It contains his best-known solo songs as well as those he recorded with the Vibrators.

== Track listing ==
1. "Rock and Roll Band" - Chris Spedding's New Band
2. "She's My Friend"
3. "White Lady"
4. "Don't Leave Me"
5. "Motor Bikin'"
6. "Working for the Union"
7. "Jump in My Car"
8. "New Girl in the Neighbourhood"
9. "Guitar Jamboree"
10. "Pogo Dancing" - Chris Spedding and The Vibrators
11. "Hurt By Love"
12. "Wild in the Street"
13. "Get Outa My Pagoda"
14. "Hey Miss Betty"
15. "Silver Bullet"
16. "Wild Wild Women"
17. "Road Runner"
18. "Gunfight"
19. "Bored, Bored"
20. "Breakout" (Live)
21. "Video Life"
22. "The Crying Game"
23. "I'm Not Like Everybody Else"
