= Chris Spedding =

Musical artist (born 1944)

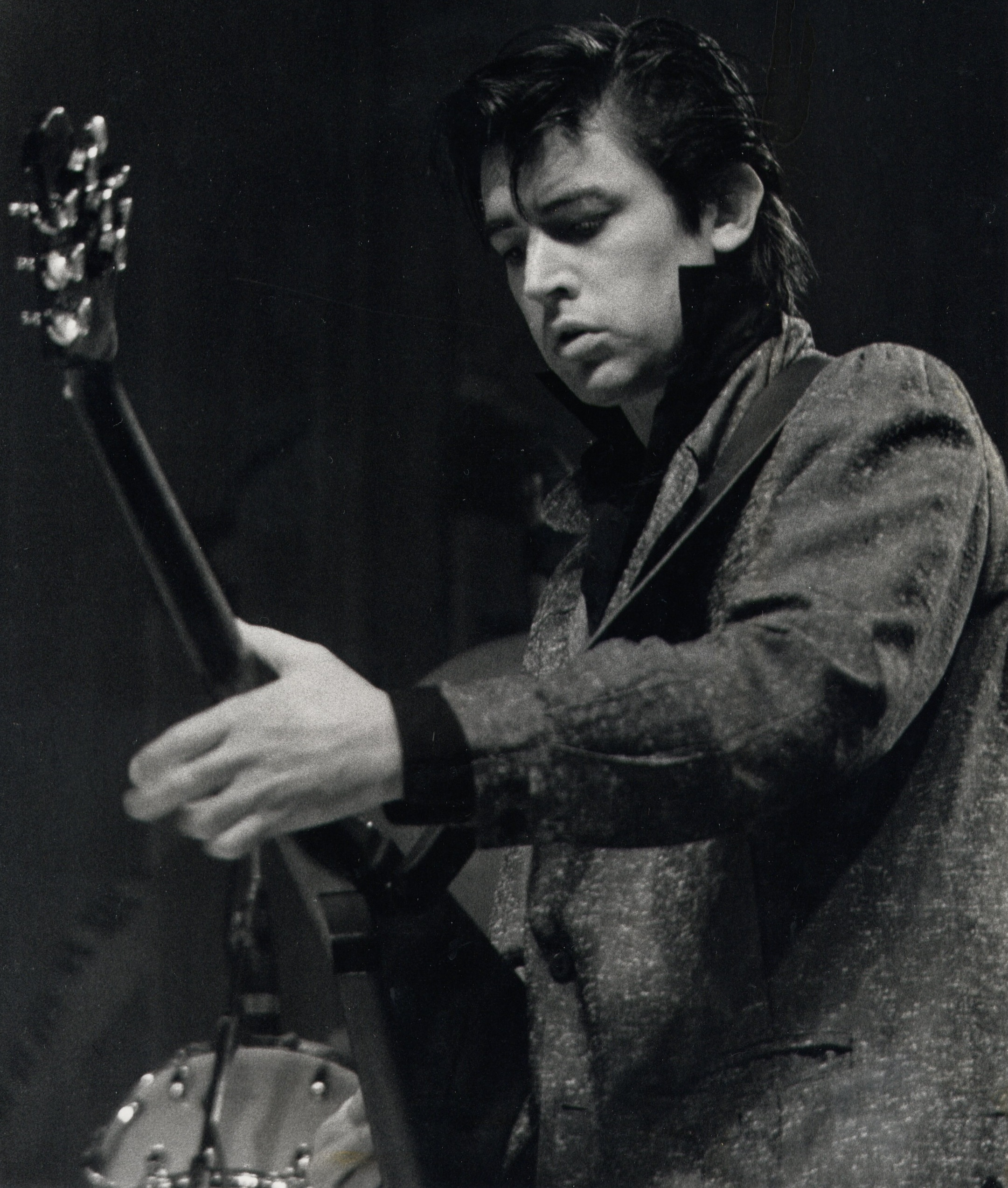
- Spedding performing in Toronto, Canada, 1979

Background information
- Born: Peter Robinson; 17 June 1944 (age 82); Staveley, Derbyshire, England
- Genres: Rock
- Occupations: Musician; singer; songwriter; record producer
- Instrument: Guitar
- Years active: Late 1960s–present
- Labels: RAK; Harvest; CBS; New Rose; Date
- Website: chrisspedding.com

Christopher John Spedding (born Peter Robinson, 17 June 1944) is an English guitarist and record producer. In a career spanning more than 50 years, Spedding is best known for his studio session work. By the early 1970s, he had become one of the most sought-after session guitarists in England. Spedding has played on and produced many albums and singles. He has also been a member of eleven rock bands: the Battered Ornaments, Frank Ricotti Quartet, King Mob, Mike Batt and Friends, Necessaries, Nucleus, Ricky Norton, Sharks, Trigger, and the Wombles. In May 1976, Spedding also produced the first Sex Pistols recordings.

AllMusic has described Spedding as "one of the UK's most versatile session guitarists, [he] has had a long career on two continents that saw him tackle nearly every style of rock and roll ...".

Spedding, a long-time friend of Chrissie Hynde, was a regular concert feature artist with the Pretenders on their US tour in March/April 1980. He appeared regularly during the band's encores, playing the guitar solos on their version of the Kinks' song "Stop Your Sobbing".

As well as his celebrated work as a session musician, Spedding pursued a solo career, releasing his debut album Songs Without Words in 1970. Since then, he has released fourteen studio albums, and two live albums. His only solo hit was 1975's "Motor Bikin'".

== Career ==
Chris Spedding was born in Staveley, Derbyshire, but was raised in Sheffield and Birmingham by adoptive parents Muriel and Jack Spedding, and renamed Christopher John Spedding.

Whilst still with the Battered Ornaments, which without the departing Pete Brown left Spedding as their frontman, he joined the Frank Ricotti Quartet, and played guitar on the album Our Point of View, released in July 1969. He was also invited to play on Jack Bruce's first and third solo albums, Songs for a Tailor (1969) and Harmony Row (1971).

Spedding then recorded his own instrumental album, Songs Without Words (1970) for Harvest Records, which was released only in Japan.

During this time, he was also playing jazz-fusion with Nucleus and recorded and toured with Mike Gibbs, featuring as lead soloist on the track "Five for England" on Gibbs's Tanglewood '63 album. He played guitar on the Pete Atkin/Clive James album Driving Through Mythical America. He was a session player on Harry Nilsson's breakthrough album, Nilsson Schmilsson, recorded in London. In 1970, he played on the original recording of Jesus Christ Superstar, and in 1971 he also played on Pieces of Me by Linda Hoyle and Coming from Reality by Sixto Rodriguez, who was later the subject of the 2012 documentary Searching for Sugar Man. During 1972–74, Spedding played a central role in Sharks, initially with ex-Free bassist Andy Fraser. They recorded two albums and toured with Roxy Music. After that, he toured and recorded with John Cale. He also played with Roy Harper's occasional backing band Trigger, notably on 1975's HQ album. In 1972–76, he played in Mike Batt's novelty band The Wombles taking part in their UK tour in full costume wielding his trademark Gibson Flying V.

In 1975, Spedding had a Top 20 solo hit in the UK with "Motor Bikin'", which he promoted with popular television appearances on Top of the Pops and Supersonic, dressed in leather motorcycling gear, with greased hair. On his 1976 single Pogo Dancing he was backed by punk rock band The Vibrators. When further hits failed to materialise, he subsequently became better known as a session guitarist, appearing and recording with Bryan Ferry, Roxy Music, Elton John, Brian Eno, Jack Bruce, Nick Mason, Art Garfunkel, Typically Tropical, Katie Melua and Ginger Baker, amongst others. His own album Chris Spedding (1975) was produced by Mickie Most. Spedding recorded a version of the American singer-songwriter Garland Jeffreys' song, "Wild in the Streets", on his own Hurt album. The song has since been covered by the Circle Jerks and is featured on Tony Hawk's American Wasteland.

Spedding was the producer of the Sex Pistols' first demos, which were recorded on 12 May 1976 at London's Majestic Studios, where he had recorded his contributions to Eno's album Here Come the Warm Jets and the Sharks track "Kung Fu". The three tracks recorded were "Problems", "No Feelings" and "Pretty Vacant"; there are persistent rumours that he played guitar and bass on their debut album, Never Mind the Bollocks, Here's the Sex Pistols, however both Sex Pistols guitarist Steve Jones and Spedding himself deny this entirely. The following year, Spedding featured extensively on the concept album Jeff Wayne's Musical Version of The War of the Worlds, issued in 1978.

Spedding moved to New York City, joined the Necessaries as a guitarist and songwriter, collaborated with drummer/percussionist David Van Tieghem, and worked extensively with Robert Gordon. Before long he was back in the UK and recorded another album of his own, I'm Not Like Everybody Else (1980). The same year he appeared on Joan Armatrading's album Me Myself I, playing lead guitar on a number of tracks, including the chart-hit title track. His live album, Friday the 13th was released in 1981. In 1982 he played on Nina Hagen's recording NunSexMonkRock, and over the next few years he continued his session work on such albums as Tom Waits' Rain Dogs, while periodically releasing solo material (Mean and Moody (1985), Enemy Within (1986) and Cafe Days (1990). He worked on several solo releases by Jerry Harrison (of Talking Heads) including the critically acclaimed album Casual Gods released in 1988, spawning the No. 7 hit on US Album Rock Tracks chart: "Rev It Up".

He played on the tracks "Not Such A Bad Boy", "So Bad" and "No Values" on Paul McCartney's Give My Regards to Broad Street released in 1984. Spedding recalls Ringo Starr, engineer Geoff Emerick and producer George Martin working on the same sessions as well as McCartney and his wife, Linda. In the same year he played on Roger Daltrey's solo album Parting Should Be Painless. Spedding was producer of the first two albums by the Canadian rockabilly band, the Razorbacks, titled Go to Town (1988) and Live a Little (1989). In 1995, he played on Willy DeVille's Big Easy Fantasy, and later that year, on his album Loup Garou.

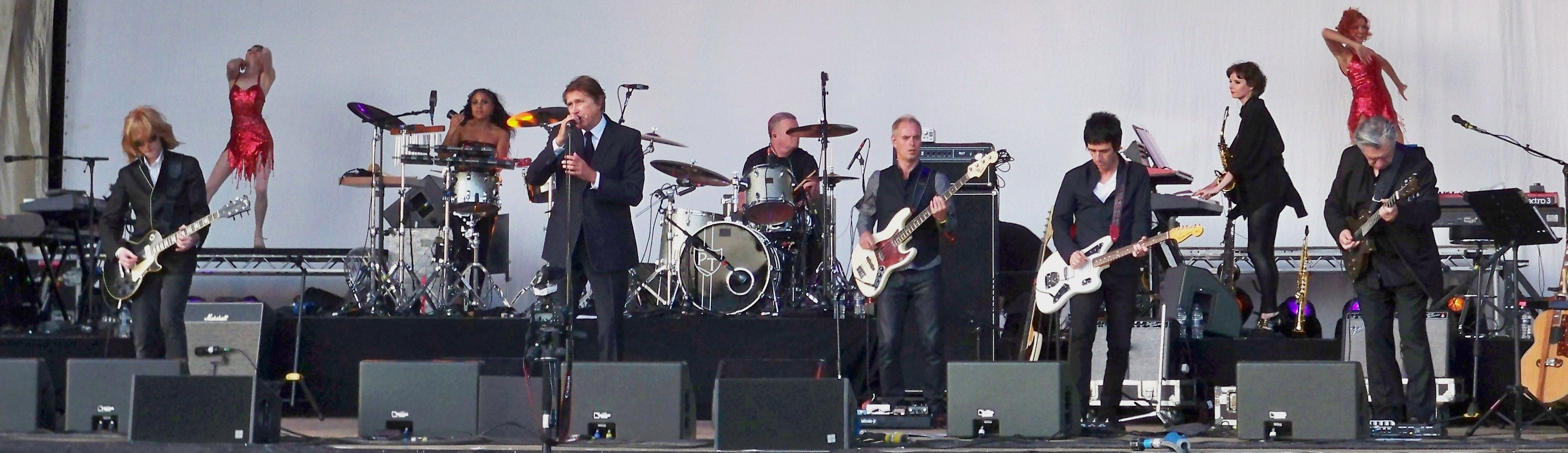
Spedding (far right) on stage with singer Bryan Ferry (centre) at GuilFest, 2012

Accepting an invitation, Spedding toured with a reformed Roxy Music in 2001. By now in his late fifties, Spedding's own blues rock offerings One Step Ahead of the Blues (2002) and Click Clack (2005) were released, followed by It's Now Or Never in 2007. He was one of only two musicians from the 1976 album Jeff Wayne's Musical Version of The War of the Worlds to return for Jeff Wayne's Black Smoke Band's 2006–2012 tour of Europe. He then featured on the 2012 album Jeff Wayne's Musical Version of The War of the Worlds – The New Generation, touring with the show in 2012 and 2014.

On 31 October 2011 the CD King Mob album was released featuring Spedding on guitar, Glen Matlock on bass, Martin Chambers on drums, Sixteen on guitar and fronted by Stephen W. Parsons, known as "Snips", a former member of the Sharks. Although both the album and live shows received positive reviews, King Mob announced that they were disbanding in September 2012.

In June 2014 Spedding appeared as a special guest playing guitar with Bryan Ferry at the 2014 Glastonbury Festival. In 2017 and 2019 he toured the US with Ferry.

== Select discography ==
=== Albums ===
- A Meal You Can Shake Hands with in the Dark with the Battered Ornaments (Harvest, SHVL 752, June 1969)
- Our Point of View for Frank Ricotti Quartet, CBS (1969)
- Songs for a Tailor for Jack Bruce, Polydor (1969)
- Deep Down Heavy (France) (1970) for Bob Downes, Music for Pleasure (MFP 5130)
- Elastic Rock with Nucleus, Vertigo (1970)
- Songs Without Words (Japan) Toshiba EMI (1970)
- Backwood Progression (UK) Harvest (1970)
- Harmony Row for Jack Bruce, Polydor (1971)
- We'll Talk About It Later with Nucleus, Vertigo (1971)
- Nilsson Schmilsson (1971) and Son of Schmilsson (1972) for Harry Nilsson, RCA Victor
- The Only Lick I Know (UK) Harvest (1972) – engineered by Alan Parsons at Abbey Road Studios
- Nowhere Road (1973) Deram / London, by ex-Savoy Brown vocalist Chris Youlden
- First Water (1973) and Jab it in Yore Eye (1974) as a member of Sharks, Island Records
- Chris Spedding (UK) RAK (1976) – produced by Mickie Most
- Hurt (UK) RAK (1977) – produced by Chris Thomas includes "Hurt By Love"
- In Your Mind (1977) for Bryan Ferry, Polydor Records
- Guitar Graffiti (UK) RAK (1978)
- I'm Not Like Everybody Else (UK) RAK (1980)
- Friday the 13th (US) Passport (1981)
- Enemy Within (France) New Rose (1986)
- Like Satin (France) New Rose (1988)
- Tightrope Walker (France) New Rose (1989)
- Cafe Days (France) New Rose (1990)
- Just Plug Him In! (France) New Rose (1991)
- Gesundheit! (France) Versailles/Sony (1995)
- Big Easy Fantasy (1995)
- Loup Garou (1995)
- One Step Ahead of the Blues (Belgium) Music Avenue (2002)/(UK) Repertoire (2009)
- The Very Best of Chris Spedding EMI Gold (2005)
- Click Clack (Germany) SPV GmbH (2005)
- It's Now Or Never (US) Ryko (2007)
- Pearls (2011)
- Joyland (2015)

=== Singles ===
- "Rock and Roll Band"/"Goodbye We Loved You (Madly)" (1969) A side credited to Chris Spedding's New Band/B side credited to Chris Spedding & The Battered Ornaments UK Harvest HAR 5013
- "My Bucket's Got a Hole in It"/"I Can't Boogie" (1975) UK Island WIP 6225
- "Motor Bikin'"/"Working for the Union" (1975) UK Rak RAK 210 No. 14, AUS No.63
- "Jump in My Car"/"Running Round" (1976) UK Rak RAK 228
- "New Girl in the Neighbourhood"/"Truck Drivin' Man" (1976) UK Rak RAK 232
- "Guitar Jamboree"/"Sweet Disposition" (1976) UK Rak RAK 236
- "Pogo Dancing"/"The Pose" with The Vibrators (1976) UK Rak RAK 246
- "Get Outta My Pagoda"/"Hey Miss Betty" (1977) UK Rak RAK 261
- "Silver Bullet"/"Wild Wild Women" (1977) UK Rak RAK 268
- "Bored Bored"/"Time Warp" (1978) UK Rak RAK 274
- "Gunfight"/"Evil" (1978) UK Rak RAK 282
- "Video Life"/"Frontal Lobotomy" (Live) (1979) UK Rak RAK 290
- "The Crying Game"/"Counterfeit" (1980) UK Rak RAK 323
- "I'm Not Like Everybody Else"/"Contract" (1981) UK Rak RAK 326

== Collaborations ==
With Joan Armatrading

- Me Myself I (A&M Records, 1980)

With John Cale

- Slow Dazzle (Island Records, 1975)
- Helen of Troy (Island Records, 1975)
- Music for a New Society (ZE Records, 1982)

With Roger Daltrey

- Parting Should Be Painless (Atlantic Records, 1984)

With Willy DeVille

- Loup Garou (EastWest Records, 1995)

With Diamond Dogs

- Macon Georgia Giant (Wild Kingdom, 2025)

With Donovan

- Cosmic Wheels (Columbia Records, 1973)

With Cass Elliot

- The Road Is No Place for a Lady (RCA Records, 1972)

With David Essex

- David Essex (Columbia Records, 1974)
- All the Fun of the Fair (Columbia Records, 1975)
- Imperial Wizard (Mercury Records, 1979)
- The Whisper (Mercury Records, 1983)

With Bryan Ferry

- Let's Stick Together (E.G. Records, 1976)
- In Your Mind (E.G. Records, 1977)
- Frantic (Virgin Records, 2002)
- Dylanesque (Virgin Records, 2007)
- Olympia (Virgin Records, 2010)
- Avonmore (BMG, 2014)

With Art Garfunkel

- Fate for Breakfast (Columbia Records, 1979)
- Scissors Cut (Columbia Records, 1981)

With Nina Hagen

- NunSexMonkRock (CBS Records, 1982)

With Elton John

- Madman Across the Water (Uni Records, 1971)

With John Lodge

- Natural Avenue (Decca, 1977)
- 10,000 Light Years Ago (Esoteric Antenna, 2015)

With Paul McCartney

- Pipes of Peace (Columbia Records, 1983)

With Katie Melua

- Call Off the Search (Dramatico, 2003)
- Piece by Piece (Dramatico, 2005)
- Pictures (Dramatico, 2007)
- Ketevan (Dramatico, 2013)

With Frankie Miller

- Full House (Chrysalis Records, 1977)
- Standing on the Edge (Capitol Records, 1982)
- Dancing in the Rain (Vertigo Records, 1986)

With Harry Nilsson

- Nilsson Schmilsson (RCA Victor, 1971)
- Son of Schmilsson (RCA Records, 1972)

With Paolo Nutini

- Caustic Love (Atlantic Records, 2014)

With Annette Peacock

- X-Dreams (Aura, 1978)

With John Phillips

- Pay Pack & Follow (Eagle Records, 2001)

With Rodriguez

- Coming from Reality (Sussex Records, 1971)

With Splinter

- Harder to Live (Dark Horse Records, 1975)

With The Vibrators

- Mars Casino (Cleopatra Records, 2020)

With Tom Waits

- Rain Dogs (Island Records, 1985)

With Jeff Wayne

- Jeff Wayne's Musical Version of the War of the Worlds (CBS Records, 1978)
