= Stephen W. Parsons =

British musician, composer and record producer

Steve Parsons
- Also known as: Snips, Mr. Snips, SWP
- Born: Stephen W. Parsons; 19 June 1951 (age 75); Bridlington, East Riding of Yorkshire, England
- Genres: Rock
- Occupations: Musician, composer, songwriter, record producer
- Website: http://www.stephenwparsons.com/

Stephen W. Parsons (born 19 June 1951, in Bridlington, East Riding of Yorkshire), also known as Steve Parsons, Stephen Parsons, Snips, Mr. Snips, SWP, is an English musician, composer, songwriter and record producer.

== Career ==
Steve Parsons debuted his musical career in the Hull scene, where (in the years 1968–1972) he played in several Beat music groups (21st Century, Spanish Leather, Flesh, Chest Fever and Nothineverappens). His talent was spotted by Island Records and, after a successful audition, he received an offer to join the newly created supergroup Sharks as lead singer and songwriter. The band included Chris Spedding and ex-Free bassist Andy Fraser. It was initially managed by Island founder Chris Blackwell.

The initial album, First Water, was released in 1973. The band travelled in a Sharkmobile (a customised Pontiac LeMans with a fin on the roof and teeth on the grill) and supported Roxy Music on their first UK tour. After this tour Fraser left the band due to musical differences and he was replaced by Busta 'Cherry' Jones from Memphis, Tennessee. The band added Nick Judd on keyboards and recorded their second album Jab It in Yore Eye. Sharks successfully toured the US in 1974, but were unable to build on this as they broke up at the end of the year.

As Mr. Snips, he joined the Baker Gurvitz Army in 1975 and sang on both their second album Elysian Encounter and their third Hearts on Fire. The band toured extensively in Europe and the US before breaking up. He then contributed vocals and songs to Ginger Baker's solo album Ginger Baker and Friends in 1977.

In the same year he contributed a vocal performance to the Intergalactic Touring Band, a science fiction concept album released on Passport Records in the US and Charisma Records in the UK. Other featured vocalists included Ben E. King and Arthur Brown.

In 1978, he released his first solo album Snips and the Video Kings on the Jet Records label. He toured with the Video Kings which included John Bentley, Clem Clempson, Graham Deakin and bassist Jackie Badger. The album was produced by Steve Lillywhite. Parsons also contributed songs to Chris Spedding's Guitar Graffiti album for RAK Records. In November, Parsons produced what was planned to be Adam and the Ants' second single for Decca Records, "I'm A Xerox Machine"/"Kick" recorded at RAK Studios, but the Ants were dropped from Decca before the single could be released. (Retitled "Zerox", re-recorded in May 1979 with Adam Ant self-producing and with a changed B-side "Whip In My Valise", the single was eventually released on Do It Records in mid 1979).

In 1979, Parsons married Jackie Badger and, as Snips, then signed to MAM Records, who released a single "9 O’Clock" which he co-produced with Midge Ure.

Spedding then produced the Snips album La Rocca in 1981 for EMI and the pair reunited briefly for live performances on a North American tour in the same year. Also in 1981, Parsons, as a film director, shot videos for acts from the Cherry Red Records including Men Without Hats.

In 1982, he began a career as a composer producer for film and television, under his real name Stephen Parsons. His early work included public information films for the COI and corporate work. From 1984 until 2005, he worked for advertising clients both in the UK and the US as a composer/producer of music for television and film. In 1988, he changed his screen credit to Stephen W Parsons to avoid confusion with a composer of Christian music named Stephen Parsons. His UK television credits include Call Red and two series of Fat Friends. In the US he worked on Push for the ABC network in 1998. In partnership with Francis Haines, he wrote the music for the Channel 4 animated documentary, Abductees.

His film credits include Howling II, Charlie, Funny Man, Journal of a Contract Killer and Nine Miles Down. Feature film scores in partnership with Francis Haines include Conspiracy of Silence (which won US National Board of Review of Motion Pictures Freedom of Expression 2004 award and Director John Deery won the Hartley-Merrill screenwriting award), Another 9½ Weeks, and Split Second.

Parsons produced and composed music for a number of instrumental albums between 1985 and 1997, including Dreams of Gold for Filmtrax, Passion for Theta Records and The Institute of Formal Research for Bubblehead Records. IoFR features solos by Zoot Horn Rollo, Guy Barker, Chris Spedding and Mick Taylor. Parsons also contributed four instrumental tracks to the Dungeons & Dragons First Quest concept album in 1986.

In 1989, he produced singer Steve Marriott's last album 30 Seconds to Midnite for Castle Records.

As screenwriter/producer and composer, his production company shot a pilot film for a television series based on the concepts of writer H.P. Lovecraft. The 45 min. pilot was released on DVD by Lurker Films in 2000 entitled Rough Magik (a.k.a. Dreams of Cthulhu). His contribution to the Lovecraft Mythos is detailed in The Lurker in the Lobby, a reference volume for film and TV adaptations of H.P. Lovecraft.

In 2011, as Stephen Parsons, he formed the band King Mob, which included Glen Matlock, Chris Spedding, Martin Chambers and rockabilly guitarist Sixteen. In 2012 they released the album Force 9 (produced by Parsons) on the SPV Steamhammer label.

Also in 2012, as SWP, he began writing a series of articles for the online magazine Trebuchet, which offer a personal view of the history and development of counter culture. His specialist subjects include: Philip K. Dick, Charles Manson and H. P. Lovecraft.

In 2013, he co-wrote and co-produced the Chris Spedding album Joyland for Cleopatra Records. Guest stars on the album included Bryan Ferry, Johnny Marr, Ian McShane and the late Andy Fraser.

In the same year he developed a health food company dedicated to California style blending. The brand is now known as Huna Blends and was the subject of a feature in the November 2015 issue of Women's Health magazine.

In late 2015, he reunited with Chris Spedding to perform Sharks songs as a tribute to Andy Fraser, who died earlier in the year. In 2017, Sharks released the new album Killers of the Deep (rated by Classic Rock magazine as one of the top 50 albums of the year so far). The new line up (including Paul Cook of the Sex Pistols) has so far toured the UK and Japan winning acclaim for their high energy and slightly chaotic stage shows.

The 21st Century revival of Sharks has been filmed for over two years and Parsons is now editing the material into a feature documentary entitled One Last Thrill.

== Discography ==
Solo

- Video King (1978)
- 9 O'Clock (1980)
- La Rocca! (1981)
- Passion (1988)

With Sharks

- First Water (1973)
- Jab It in Yore Eye (1974)
- Music Breakout (produced in 1974, released in 2016, under the title Car Crash Tapes)
- Like a Black Van Parked on a Dark Curve (1995)
- Killers of the Deep (2017)

With Baker Gurvitz Army

- Elysian Encounter (1975)
- Hearts on Fire (1976)

With Ginger Baker

- Ginger Baker and Friends (1977)

With Chris Spedding

- Guitar Graffiti (1978)
- Joyland (2013)

With King Mob

- Force 9 (2012)

== Selected film soundtracks ==
- Howling II (1985)
- Split Second (1992) (with Francis Haines)
- Funny Man (1994)
- Another 9½ Weeks (1997) (with Francis Haines)
- Conspiracy of Silence (2003) (with Francis Haines)
- Charlie (2003)
- Journal of a Contract Killer (2008)
- Nine Miles Down (2009)
