= Elysian Encounter =

Studio album by Baker Gurvitz Army
- Released: 1975
- Recorded: Island, London
- Length: 40:06
- Label: Atco (U.S.A., original release); Repertoire (U.S.A., reissue(s)); Vertigo (Europe); Mountain (England)
- Producer: Adrian Gurvitz, Ginger Baker, Anton Matthews

Baker Gurvitz Army chronology
Baker Gurvitz Army (1975)	Elysian Encounter (1975)	Hearts on Fire (1976)

Professional ratings
Review scores
Source	Rating
AllMusic	4.5/5 stars
The Rolling Stone Record Guide	2/5 stars

Elysian Encounter is the second album by the English band Baker Gurvitz Army, released in 1975.

== Track listing ==
All tracks composed by Adrian Gurvitz; except where noted.

1. "People" (Ginger Baker, Adrian Gurvitz) – 4:17
2. "The Key" (Ginger Baker, Paul Gurvitz) – 6:24
3. "Time" – 4:04
4. "The Gambler" – 4:23
5. "The Dreamer" – 3:41
6. "Remember" (Ginger Baker, Adrian Gurvitz) – 5:24
7. "The Artist" – 5:12
8. "The Hustler" (Ginger Baker, Adrian Gurvitz, Paul Gurvitz) – 6:41

== Personnel ==
- Mr. Snips - lead vocals (1, 2, 4, 5, 7, 8)
- Adrian Gurvitz - guitar, backing and lead (3, 6) vocals
- Peter Lemer - keyboards
- Paul Gurvitz - bass, backing vocals
- Ginger Baker - drums, backing vocals, percussion
- Anton Matthews - backing vocals, prime engineer

Mixed at Trident Studios and Advision Studios
