= Unreal!!! =

Studio album by Ray Stevens
- Released: November 1970
- Genre: Pop
- Label: Barnaby
- Producer: Ray Stevens

Ray Stevens chronology
Everything Is Beautiful (1970)	Unreal!!! (1970)	Rock & Roll Show (1971)

Unreal!!! is the seventh studio album by Ray Stevens and his second for Barnaby Records, released in 1970. Two singles ("America, Communicate With Me" and "Sunset Strip") were lifted from the album and were moderately successful on the Hot 100 pop singles chart. Each single reached the Top-20 on the Billboard Adult-Contemporary chart, indicating that Stevens' appeal, even as early as 1970, lay with the adult music buyers rather than the kids and teenagers. All but two of the tracks were written by Stevens himself, with one of the others, "Talking", being written by Stevens' brother, John Ragsdale.

On May 17, 2005, Collectables Records re-released this album and Stevens' previous album Everything Is Beautiful together on one CD.

The Detroit Free Press commented that only the songs "Sunset Strip" and "America, Communicate with Me" on the album were up to Stevens' usual standards.

== Track listing ==
Side 1
No.	Title	Writer(s)	Length
1.	"Sunset Strip"	Ray Stevens	3:37
2.	"Can We Get to That"	Ray Stevens	3:21
3.	"Imitation of Life"	Ray Stevens	3:08
4.	"Night People"	Ray Stevens	3:22
5.	"America, Communicate With Me"	Ray Stevens	3:06

Side 2
No.	Title	Writer(s)	Length
1.	"Come Around"	Bently Smith	2:48
2.	"Loving You on Paper"	Ray Stevens	3:17
3.	"Dream Girl"	Ray Stevens	2:35
4.	"Monkey See, Monkey Do"	Ray Stevens	2:38
5.	"Talking"	John Ragsdale	2:10
6.	"Islands"	Ray Stevens	2:40

== Album credits ==
- All songs arranged and produced by: Ray Stevens for Ahab Productions, Inc.
- Engineer: Charlie Tallent
- All songs published by: Ahab Music Co., Inc. (BMI)
- Front cover photo: Keats Tyler
- Back cover photo courtesy of NBC-TV

== Charts ==
Album - Billboard (North America)

Year	Chart	Position
1970	The Billboard 200	141

Singles - Billboard (North America)

Year	Single	Chart	Position
1970	"America, Communicate With Me"	Billboard Hot 100	45
1970	"America, Communicate With Me"	Billboard Adult Contemporary	12
1970	"America, Communicate With Me"	Canadian Singles Chart	34
1970	"Sunset Strip"	Billboard Hot 100	81
1970	"Sunset Strip"	Billboard Adult Contemporary	17
1970	"Sunset Strip"	Canadian Singles Chart	68
1970	"Sunset Strip"	Canadian RPM Hot Adult Contemporary Tracks	30
