= Bingley Hall, Stafford =

Bingley Hall
- Interactive map of the Bingley Hall area
- Alternative names: New Bingley Hall

General information
- Location: Stafford, England
- Coordinates: 52.8248°N 2.0653°W

Bingley Hall (also known as New Bingley Hall to distinguish itself from the Bingley Hall in Birmingham) is an exhibition hall located in Stafford, England, on the site of the Staffordshire County Showground. During the 1970s and 1980s it was a very popular concert venue.

== History ==
Notable performers include Bob Marley & The Wailers, Status Quo, Yes (3 sell out nights), The Rolling Stones, Pink Floyd, The Who, Rush, Black Sabbath, Abba, Genesis (who were filmed there in 1976 for Genesis: In Concert), Santana, David Bowie, ZZ Top, Motörhead, Eagles, Barry Manilow, Kiss, Queen, Rainbow, Electric Light Orchestra, and Bruce Springsteen and the E Street Band.
