= Forty Five Hundred Times =

Song by Status Quo

from the album Hello!
- Released: 1973 (Hello!), 1977 (Live!) 1991 (Rock 'til You Drop)
- Genre: Hard rock, prog rock, blues rock
- Length: 9:54 (Hello! version); 17:10 (Live! version); 12:56 (Rock' til You Drop version)
- Label: Vertigo Records
- Songwriters: Francis Rossi, Rick Parfitt

"Forty Five Hundred Times" is a song by British rock band Status Quo. It is the final track on their 1973 album Hello!, almost ten minutes long and regularly performed live. The group's frontmen, Francis Rossi and Rick Parfitt, have said it is one of their favourite songs by the band, with Parfitt using a special dropped tuning. While never released as a single, the song was #1 as voted by fans.

== Composition ==
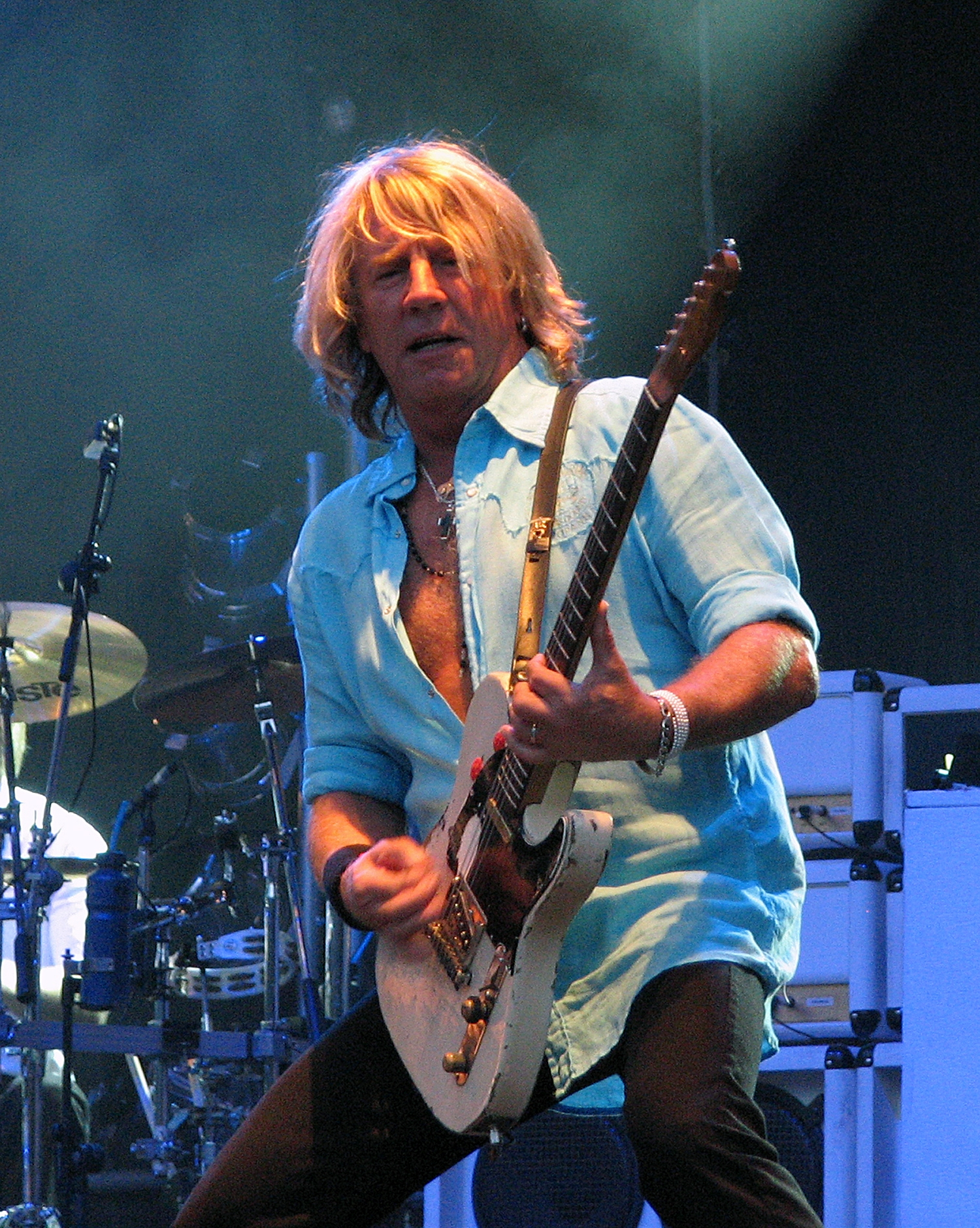
Rick Parfitt playing with Status Quo in 2007

The song was one of the few that members Francis Rossi and Rick Parfitt wrote together. Rossi recalled, "Each time we'd get something good Rick would try to improve it and we'd lose track of where we were. It was like pulling teeth, which is among the reasons why we stopped writing together." Parfitt sang lead and played rhythm guitar using an alternative tuning with the top and bottom strings retuned from E to B. He discovered the tuning while randomly playing around with the tuning pegs on his guitar after "a few glasses of wine". To get the required sound, he replaced the bottom string with a 60-gauge one from a bass guitar. The song features a time signature change from 4/4 to 6/8 partway through, before reverting to 4/4 at the end, albeit much faster than at the beginning. Jazz pianist John Mealing played as a guest on the track.

Rossi later said it was one of his favourite Quo songs (along with Hello! as an album generally), as did Parfitt, who enjoyed the improvised jam at the end of the track and declared it his favourite guitar moment with the band. He recalled, "The amps were all around the room, and we just sat in a circle and vibed with each other. Nobody knew where anybody was gonna go, and in those days, you didn’t give a fuck about overspill, so the amps were cranked. It was magical".

Of the title, Rossi remarked: "Rick and I were in a Yankee phase at the time… In 'real' English it would've been called 'Four Thousand, Five Hundred Times' – which doesn't quite work, does it?"

== Release ==
The song was first released in 1973 as the last track on Hello!. When that album was reissued on a Japanese compact disc in 1987, as a double set with the earlier Piledriver, "Forty Five Hundred Times" had to be dropped owing to space reasons.

The original studio version has been included on several compilation albums. The version on XS All Areas was shortened to roughly seven minutes. It was re-recorded for the album Rock 'til You Drop (1991), including the jam over Gotta Go Home as played live, though at twelve minutes, it is more brief than typical live versions (see below).

== Live performances ==
The song was not performed live when Hello! was first released, but was introduced into the set around 1975. For concert performances, Parfitt used a custom Gibson SG tuned specifically for the song, leaving the bottom B string slightly flat. It was subsequently played frequently, always elongated with a jam in E minor that originates from the song Gotta Go Home from Ma Kelly's Greasy Spoon. There is one bootleg from 1975 that includes the vocal from Gotta Go Home but the vocal was omitted thereafter.

The first released live version is extended to 17 minutes on 1977's Live!, recorded at the Glasgow Apollo. The longest versions available on bootlegs were played on the Never Too Late tour in 1981, clocking in at almost 24 minutes.

A 20-minute version was performed at the NEC Arena in 1982 at a charity concert for The Prince's Trust, with Coghlan's replacement Pete Kircher reinterpreting the original drum parts. This rendition was subsequently released in the expanded version of the album Live at the N.E.C. in 2017. The song disappeared from the set after the End of the Road tour in 1984, but it was reintroduced in 1990 (with the new rhythm section of John "Rhino" Edwards and Jeff Rich). These fifteen minute versions, played before the 1991 re-recording, marked the last time the song was extended greatly.

In 1993, the song was played in a shortened version for the first time, segueing into Junior's Wailing. The same configuration was used again in 1999. From 2000 onwards, Status Quo regularly played an abbreviated version which transitioned into Rain. It was performed the same way at the "Frantic Four" concerts in 2013 featuring original Quo members Rossi, Parfitt, Alan Lancaster and John Coghlan. In 2014, however, the classic line-up opted for a version closer to the original that segued into Gotta Go Home (with vocals), together clocking in at around eight minutes.
