= Baker Gurvitz Army (album) =

Studio album by Baker Gurvitz Army
- Released: 1975
- Studio: Ramport Studios, London
- Genre: Hard rock
- Length: 42:26
- Label: Janus (U.S.A.); Vertigo (Europe)
- Producer: Ginger Baker, Adrian Gurvitz, Paul Gurvitz

Baker Gurvitz Army chronology
Baker Gurvitz Army (1975)	Elysian Encounter (1975)

Professional ratings
Review scores
Source	Rating
Allmusic	4/5 stars

Baker Gurvitz Army is Baker Gurvitz Army's first studio album.

There was an orange vinyl re-issue in the UK as part of Record Store Day on 22 April 2023.

== Track listing ==
1. "Help Me" (Adrian Gurvitz) – 4:34
2. "Love Is" (Gurvitz) – 2:47
3. "Memory Lane" (Ginger Baker, Gurvitz) – 4:46
4. "Inside of Me" (Gurvitz) – 5:33
5. "I Wanna Live Again" (Baker, Gurvitz) – 4:22
6. "Mad Jack" (Baker, Gurvitz) – 7:54
7. "4 Phil" (Baker, Gurvitz) – 4:25
8. "Since Beginning" (Gurvitz) – 8:05

== Personnel ==
- Ginger Baker – drums, percussion, vibraphone, vocals
- Madeline Bell – vocals
- Cyrano – engineer
- Martyn Ford – orchestration
- Adrian Gurvitz – guitar, vocals
- Paul Gurvitz – bass guitar, vocals
- Rosetta Hightower – vocals
- Ulf Marquardt – liner notes
- Anton Matthews – mixing engineer
- John Mitchell – keyboards, backing vocals
- Barry St. John – vocals
- Liza Strike – vocals
- Mixed at Trident Studios and Island Studios

== Charts ==
Chart (1975)	Peak position
UK Albums (OCC)	22
