= Tony Maylam =

British film director

Tony Maylam (born May 26, 1943, in London) is a BAFTA-nominated English filmmaker, known for directing documentaries such as White Rock, the 1979 thriller The Riddle of the Sands, and horror films such as The Burning and Split Second.

== Life and career ==
Trained at the Royal Academy of Dramatic Art, he began his career as an actor and then television presenter for ZFB in Bermuda (The Tony Maylam Show) and the UK's ITV (Sportsweek), before concentrating solely on filmmaking. Always interested in sport, he began his cinematic career in 1972 with the film Cup Glory, a feature-length theatrical film with Richard Attenborough on the 100 years of the FA Cup. A number of films for television followed, which he wrote and directed, including Graham, on Graham Hill with Paul Newman (which was one of the highest rated documentaries shown on British television in the 1970s) and A Fast Drive in the Country with James Coburn. This led to White Rock, again featuring James Coburn, with a bestselling soundtrack by Rick Wakeman, which played in British cinemas for over six months and garnered wide international sales and recognition, including a 1977 BAFTA nomination for the Robert Flaherty Award (Feature Length Film, Documentary In Content).

Another Tony Maylam film which received an extensive cinema release in 1976 was Genesis in Concert, featuring Phil Collins, which, like White Rock, was shot in anamorphic Panavision. This led to Tony Maylam's first fictional feature film, an adaption of the classic novel, The Riddle of the Sands, starring Simon MacCorkindale, Michael York and Jenny Agutter, which he wrote and directed.

Bob and Harvey Weinstein then bought White Rock and Genesis for release in the United States and released it under the combined title of Sensasia (Harvey at the time was a major rock promoter based in Buffalo, New York). This led to the Weinstein brothers' first venture as full movie producers, the cult horror film The Burning, which Maylam directed and which was also the first film for Jason Alexander, Fisher Stevens and Holly Hunter. Whilst in the United States, Maylam also directed a movie for ABC television, The Sins of Dorian Gray, a 1983 made-for-TV adaptation of Oscar Wilde's novel The Picture of Dorian Gray that starred Anthony Perkins.

Tony Maylam also wrote and directed the sport film Hero, featuring Diego Maradona, the Official Film of the FIFA World Cup, which received wide acclaim during its international cinema release (including Argentina, where it was one of the biggest box-office successes of 1987).

Back in the UK, Maylam made the critically acclaimed feature-length film for the BBC, Across the Lake, starring Anthony Hopkins, which was one of the highest-rated dramas on British television throughout the 1980s.

Besides a substantial amount of commercial work for companies like Coca-Cola, Goodyear and Shell, in 1992, Maylam directed a science fiction thriller, Split Second, starring Rutger Hauer, which was widely shown internationally, including the biggest print-release of any independent British film in the US. In 2001, he wrote and directed the movie thriller Phoenix Blue, and in 2008, wrote and directed a thriller shot in Italy and London, Journal of a Contract Killer, which won Best Film and Best Actress at the New York International Independent Film and Video Festival.

Tony Maylam has also written and directed ten major documentaries for Speed/Fox TV under the title, Victory by Design. This award-winning series is continuing its run.

He married in 1985 French politician Joëlle Garriaud, now a member of the French Senate.

== Filmography ==
Fiction
Year	Title	Director	Writer	Notes
1979	The Riddle of the Sands	Yes	Yes	Also producer
1981	The Burning	Yes	Story	
1983	The Sins of Dorian Gray	Yes	No	Television films
1988	Across the Lake	Yes	No	Television films
1992	Split Second	Yes	No	
2001	Phoenix Blue	Yes	Yes	
2008	Journal of a Contract Killer	Yes	Yes	

Documentaries
Year	Title	Director	Writer	Producer	Notes
1972	Just to Prove It	Yes	Yes	No	
1972	Cup Glory	Yes	Yes	Yes	
1977	Genesis: In Concert	Yes	No	Yes	Live performances by the progressive rock band Genesis.
1977	White Rock	Yes	Yes	No	
1977	Olympic Harmony	Yes	Yes	No	Shorts
1980	Olympic Spirit	Yes	No	No	Shorts
1986	Hero: The Official Film of the 1986 FIFA World Cup	Yes	Yes	No	
2004–2005	Victory by Design	Yes	No	No	Series, 6 episodes
2006	Marque of a Legend: Cars	Yes	Yes	No	
