= Baker Gurvitz Army =

English rock band

- Origin: England
- Genres: Hard rock
- Years active: 1974–1976
- Labels: Repertoire; Janus Records; Major League Productions (MLP)
- Past members: Ginger Baker; Adrian Gurvitz; Paul Gurvitz; Peter Lemer; Stephen W. Parsons

Baker Gurvitz Army were an English rock group. Their self-titled debut album featured a blend of hard rock laced with Ginger Baker's jazz- and Afrobeat-influenced drumming. The lengthy "Mad Jack" was that album's outstanding track, and the album hit the US Billboard 200 chart, and peaked at number 22 in the UK Albums Chart. The two following albums contained similar material, although neither charted in the UK nor the US.

== History ==
When Cream split up in 1968, Ginger Baker was invited to join Blind Faith, which formed the following year. This was not such a successful venture and following its demise, Baker put together his own outfit, Ginger Baker's Air Force, in 1970.

Former The Gun and Three Man Army members, brothers Paul and Adrian Gurvitz were looking for a new way ahead after early successes, so they joined forces with Baker in 1974, changing the name of the band to reflect the union, plus switching branches of the military. In 1975 they recorded two studio albums, following with one more studio album in 1976. No live albums were released during the band's lifetime. However, the death of their manager led to the band breaking up in 1976. In 2003, a compilation album, Flying in And Out of Stardom, was released, including four new live songs.

== Discography ==
=== Studio albums ===
- Baker Gurvitz Army (1975)
- Elysian Encounter (1975)
- Hearts on Fire (1976)

=== Live albums ===
- Live in Derby '75 (2005)
- Live Live Live (2005)
- Still Alive (2008)
- Live in Milan Italy 1976 (2010) – Part of The Official Ginger Baker Bootleg Series

=== Other release ===
- Flying In & Out of Stardom – The Anthology (2003) (compilation)

== Members ==
- Ginger Baker: drums
- Adrian Gurvitz: guitar, vocals
- Paul Gurvitz: bass guitar, backing vocals
- Mr Snips a.k.a. Stephen W. Parsons: lead vocals
- Peter Lemer: keyboards
