= Ginger Baker at His Best =

Compilation album by Ginger Baker
- Released: 1972
- Recorded: 1969, 1970
- Genre: Rock
- Label: Polydor
- Producer: Ginger Baker

Ginger Baker chronology
Live! (1971)	Ginger Baker at His Best (1972)	Stratavarious (1974)

Ginger Baker at His Best was part of a set of four double albums consisting of selected individual and collective output of the British rock band Cream and that of its three members. The albums were released in 1972.

The Cream album was entitled Heavy Cream, and featured illustrations of Eric Clapton, Baker and Jack Bruce. Three additional albums were devoted to each individual band member - Jack Bruce at His Best, Eric Clapton at His Best, and Ginger Baker at His Best. The Baker album is drawn from his first two solo releases, Ginger Baker's Air Force and Ginger Baker's Air Force 2, as well as his work with Blind Faith. Between Baker's and Clapton's albums, the whole of the original Blind Faith album is covered.

== Track listing ==
Side 1
No.	Title	Writer(s)	Original album	Length
1.	"Let Me Ride"	Roebuck Staples	Ginger Baker's Air Force 2	4:22
2.	"Had to Cry Today"	Steve Winwood	Blind Faith	8:43
3.	"I Don't Want to Go On Without You"	Bert Berns, Jerry Wexler	Ginger Baker's Air Force 2	3:56

Side 2
No.	Title	Writer(s)	Original album	Length
4.	"Do What You Like"	Ginger Baker	Blind Faith	15:21

Side 3
No.	Title	Writer(s)	Original album	Length
5.	"Da Da Man"	Harold McNair	Ginger Baker's Air Force	7:12
6.	"Sweet Wine"	Ginger Baker, Janet Godfrey	Ginger Baker's Air Force 2	3:34
7.	"Well All Right"	Norman Petty, Buddy Holly, Jerry Allison, Joe B. Mauldin	Blind Faith	4:28

Side 4
No.	Title	Writer(s)	Original album	Length
8.	"Can't Find My Way Home"	Steve Winwood	Blind Faith	3:13
9.	"Aiko Biaye"	Remi Kabaka, Teddy Osei	Ginger Baker's Air Force	12:58
