= Satisfied 'n Tickled Too =

Studio album by Taj Mahal
- Released: 1976
- Genre: Blues, R&B
- Label: Columbia
- Producer: Taj Mahal

Taj Mahal chronology
Music Keeps Me Together (1975)	Satisfied 'n Tickled Too (1976)	Music Fuh Ya' (Musica Para Tu) (1976)

Professional ratings
Review scores
Source	Rating
AllMusic	2/5 stars
Christgau's Record Guide	B−

Satisfied 'n Tickled Too is the ninth studio album by Taj Mahal, and was released in 1976 on the Columbia Records label.

== Track listing ==
1. "Satisfied 'n Tickled Too" (Mississippi John Hurt)
2. "New E-Z Rider Blues" (Mahal)
3. "Black Man, Brown Man" (Mahal)
4. "Baby Love" (Mahal, Theodore Life, Bill Greene)
5. "Ain't Nobody's Business" (Irving Taylor)
6. "Misty Morning Ride" (Rudy Costa)
7. "Easy to Love" (Ray Fitzpatrick)
8. "Old Time Song - Old Time Love" (Hoshal Wright)
9. "We Tune" (Kester Smith)

== Personnel ==
- Taj Mahal – lead vocals, acoustic guitar, banjo, mandolin, harmonica
- Hoshal Wright - electric guitar
- Ray Fitzpatrick - bass
- Earl "Wire" Lindo - keyboards
- Rudy Costa - alto and soprano saxophone, clarinet, flute, kalimba
- Kester Smith - trap drums
- Kwasi "Rocki" Dzidzornu, Larry McDonald - percussion, congas
- Theodore Life – guitar on "Baby Love"
- Carl Larkin - guitar on "Baby Love"
- Don Moors - vibes on "Baby Love"
- Sam Cox - drums on "Baby Love"
- John Turk - keyboards
- Joachim Young - keyboards on "Baby Love"
- Stan Mulelland - bass on "Baby Love"
- Rafael Ramirez - congas on "Baby Love"
- Rich Myers - alto saxophone on "Baby Love"
- Mother's Children - backing vocals on "Baby Love"
- Andy Narell, Bill Greene - conductor, string and horn arrangement on "Baby Love"
- Fritz Heilbron, Gordon Rowley - trombone on "New E-Z Rider Blues"
- "Sweet" Annie Sampson, Sister Carol Fredricks, Jo Baker - backing vocals on "New E-Z Rider Blues"
