= London Hyde Park 1969 =

2005 live video album by Blind Faith

Video by Blind Faith
- Released: 2005 (UK); 2006 (US)
- Recorded: 7 June 1969
- Venue: Hyde Park, London
- Genre: Blues rock
- Length: 62:13
- Label: Sanctuary Visual Entertainment

London Hyde Park 1969 is the official video album by Blind Faith of their appearance at a free concert held in Hyde Park in London on 7 June 1969. It was released in the UK in 2005, and in the US and Canada in 2006. The concert was the band's debut performance and took place two months before the release of their debut album, Blind Faith, in August 1969.

The DVD contains the band's 45-minute performance at the event, plus additional material, including interviews with Steve Winwood, Ginger Baker and Eric Clapton, and videos of the band members performing in some of their former groups, namely the Spencer Davis Group, Traffic, Family and Cream.

== Reception ==
Professional ratings
Review scores
Source	Rating
AllMusic	4.5/5 stars
The Guardian	4/5 stars

In a review for AllMusic, Bret Adams described London Hyde Park 1969 as an "excellent" recording of the concert. He found Clapton's electric guitar on "Can't Find My Way Home" "fascinating" because he played acoustic guitar on that song on Blind Faith. He was also impressed with Winwood's keyboard playing on "Do What You Like" and "Presence of the Lord". Adams noted that while the inclusion of several covers in Blind Faith's set highlights one of the band's weaknesses, namely "a lack of original, fully realized songs", he called the event "pivotal" in the history of rock music.

Writing in Clouds and Clocks, Beppe Colli noted how "ill-at-ease" Clapton appeared at times, but complimented Winwood and Baker's performances. He cited "Can't Find My Way Home" as the set's best piece and described the video album overall as "an absolutely indispensable document".

In a review in Vintage Rock, Shawn Perry had mixed feelings about the video. He described the band's performance as "listless" and "sub-par at best". He felt that while Clapton played "flawlessly", he appeared "indifferent" and seemed happy to let Winwood take the lead. Perry said "Can’t Find My Way Home", "Do What You Like" and in particular "Presence of the Lord" came across nicely, and summed up the DVD, saying, "Warts and all, it’s still a worthwhile souvenir from a pivotal period in rock and roll."

== Track listing ==
Documentary
No.	Title	Writer(s)	Performer	Length
1.	"I Feel Free" (60s Intro)	Jack Bruce/Pete Brown	Cream	1:44
2.	"Steve Winwood interview"			0:09
3.	"I'm a Man" (Promo video clip)	Steve Winwood/Jimmy Miller	The Spencer Davis Group	0:45
4.	"Winwood interview contd."			0:24
5.	"Hole in My Shoe" (Promo video clip)	Dave Mason	Traffic	1:23
6.	"Dim" (Promo video clip)	Roger Chapman/John Whitney	Family	0:35
7.	"Ginger Baker interview"			0:14
8.	"Toad" (Cream's Farewell Concert)	Ginger Baker	Cream	0:39
9.	"Eric Clapton interview"			0:55
10.	"Sunshine of Your Love" (Cream's Farewell Concert)	Bruce/Eric Clapton/Brown	Cream	2:44
11.	"Blind Faith intro"			0:29
Total length:				10:01

Concert
No.	Title	Writer(s)	Performer	Length
1.	"Well All Right"	Holly/Allison/Mauldin/Petty	Blind Faith	2:01
2.	"Sea of Joy"	Winwood	Blind Faith	5:21
3.	"Sleeping in the Ground"	Sam Myers	Blind Faith	4:04
4.	"Under My Thumb"	Jagger/Richards	Blind Faith	5:36
5.	"Can't Find My Way Home" ( (Note: Listed in the DVD liner notes as "Can't Find My Way Back Home".))	Winwood	Blind Faith	5:41
6.	"Do What You Like"	Baker	Blind Faith	5:09
7.	"Presence of the Lord"	Clapton	Blind Faith	5:55
8.	"Means to an End"	Winwood/Jim Capaldi	Blind Faith	4:05
9.	"Had to Cry Today"	Winwood	Blind Faith	6:25
Total length:				44:17

Extra features
No.	Title	Writer(s)	Performer	Length
1.	"I'm a Man" (Promo video)	Winwood/Miller	The Spencer Davis Group	2:50
2.	"Hole in My Shoe" (Promo video)	Mason	Traffic	2:39
3.	"I'm So Glad" (Cream's Farewell Concert)	Skip James	Cream	2:26
Total length:				7:55

Source: Discogs, DVD

== Personnel ==
- Blind Faith
  - Ginger Baker – drums
  - Eric Clapton – guitar
  - Ric Grech (Note: Listed as "Rick Grech" in the DVD credits.) – bass guitar
  - Steve Winwood – keyboards, vocals
- Matthew Longfellow – editor
- Ghizela Rowe – producer
- Freddie Rowe – executive producer
- Robert Stigwood – executive producer

Source: DVD credits
