= World Music (Taj Mahal album) =

Studio album by Taj Mahal
- Released: June 1, 1993
- Genre: Blues, reggae, world music
- Label: Columbia

Taj Mahal chronology
Taj's Blues (1992)	World Music (1993)	Dancing the Blues (1993)

Professional ratings
Review scores
Source	Rating
AllMusic	4/5 stars
The Penguin Guide to Blues Recordings	3/4 stars

World Music is a compilation album by American blues artist Taj Mahal.

== Track listing ==
All tracks composed by Taj Mahal; except where indicated

1. "When I Feel the Sea Beneath My Soul" - 3:06 - from Music Keeps Me Together (1975)
2. "My Ancestors" - 4:05 - from Music Keeps Me Together (1975)
3. "Slave Driver" (Bob Marley) - 2:43 - from Mo' Roots (1974)
4. "West Indian Revelation" - 6:58 - from Music Keeps Me Together (1975)
5. "Kalimba" - 1:39 - from Recycling The Blues & Other Related Stuff (1972)
6. "Desperate Lover" - 2:44 - from Mo' Roots (1974)
7. "Clara (St. Kitts Woman)" - 4:02 - from Mo' Roots (1974)
8. "Cajun Waltz" - 6:03 - from Mo' Roots (1974)
9. "Roll, Turn, Spin" - 4:45 - from Music Keeps Me Together (1975)
10. "Johnny Too Bad" (The Slickers) - 3:15 - from Mo' Roots (1974)
11. "Brown Eyed Handsome Man" - 3:43 - from Music Keeps Me Together (1975)
12. "Blackjack Davey" - 3:37 - from Mo' Roots (1974)
13. "Music Keeps Me Together" (Earl Lindo) - 3:38 - from Music Keeps Me Together (1975)
14. "When I Feel the Sea Beneath My Soul (Reprise)" - 3:06
