= List of Blind Faith concerts =

The rock band Blind Faith, composed of Steve Winwood, Eric Clapton, Ginger Baker and Rick Grech played a small number of gigs in England, Scandinavia and the United States between June and August 1969. The first gig, on 7 June at Hyde Park, London was witnessed by 100,000 fans. This was followed by a series of dates in Scandinavia through the rest of the month, followed by a US tour starting in Madison Square Garden on 12 July. The US tour continued until the group's final concert on 24 August in Hawaii, after which the group split.

== List of concerts ==
Date	City	Country	Venue
Europe
7 June 1969	London	England	Hyde Park
12 June 1969	Helsinki	Finland	Kulttuuritalo
14 June 1969	Oslo	Norway	Njardhallen
16 June 1969	Stockholm	Sweden	Kungliga tennishallen
17 June 1969	Gothenburg	Sweden	Kulturpunkten
18 June 1969	Gothenburg	Sweden	Gothenburg Concert Hall
19 June 1969	Copenhagen	Denmark	K.B. Hallen
North America
11 July 1969	Newport	United States	Fort Adams State Park (cancelled)
12 July 1969	New York City	United States	Madison Square Garden
13 July 1969	Bridgeport	United States	John F. Kennedy Stadium
16 July 1969	Philadelphia	United States	Spectrum
18 July 1969	Toronto	Canada	Varsity Stadium
19 July 1969	Montreal	Canada	Montreal Forum
20 July 1969	Baltimore	United States	Baltimore Civic Center
23 July 1969	Kansas City	United States	Municipal Stadium
26 July 1969	West Allis	United States	Wisconsin State Fair Park
27 July 1969	Chicago	United States	International Amphitheatre
1 August 1969	Detroit	United States	Olympia Stadium
3 August 1969	St. Louis	United States	Kiel Auditorium
8 August 1969	Seattle	United States	Seattle Center Coliseum
9 August 1969	Vancouver	Canada	Pacific Coliseum
10 August 1969	Portland	United States	Memorial Coliseum
14 August 1969	Oakland	United States	Oakland-Alameda County Coliseum
15 August 1969	Inglewood	United States	The Forum
16 August 1969	Santa Barbara	United States	Earl Warren Showgrounds
19 August 1969	Houston	United States	Sam Houston Coliseum
20 August 1969	San Antonio	United States	HemisFair Arena
22 August 1969	Salt Lake City	United States	Salt Palace
23 August 1969	Phoenix	United States	Arizona Veterans Memorial Coliseum
24 August 1969	Honolulu	United States	Honolulu International Center
