= Mo' Roots =

Mo' Roots may refer to:

- Mo' Roots (Taj Mahal album), 1974
- Mo' Roots (Maceo Parker album), 1991
