= Stratavarious =

1972 studio album by Ginger Baker

Studio album by Ginger Baker
- Released: 1972
- Recorded: August 1971; 1969 ("Blood Brothers 69")
- Studio: Morgan Studios; IBC Studios ("Blood Brothers 69")
- Genre: Rock, Afrobeat, jazz fusion
- Length: 36:28
- Label: Polydor (original UK release); Atco (original US release); RSO (European reissue)
- Producer: Ginger Baker

Ginger Baker chronology
Winwood and Friends (1972)	Stratavarious (1972)	Baker Gurvitz Army (1974)

Professional ratings
Review scores
Source	Rating
Allmusic	3/5 stars

Stratavarious is an album by Ginger Baker, released by Polydor in 1972. Baker had many associations with an eclectic mix of musicians brought together under numerous band titles bearing his surname. Stratavarious is the only album that was released under the name of Ginger Baker without other associated names. The lineup on Stratavarious included Bobby Tench, vocalist and guitarist from The Jeff Beck Group, who plays guitar and bass as well as singing under the pseudonym Bobby Gass and the Nigerian pioneer of Afrobeat, Fela Kuti who appeared at concerts with Baker at this time.

The album was re-issued in 1998 on Polygram in the US under the title of Do What You Like, along with all of Ginger Baker's Air Force and Ginger Baker's Air Force 2.

== Track listing ==
Side 1
No.	Title	Length
1.	"Ariwo" (Traditional, arranged by Fela Kuti and Ginger Baker)	11:10
2.	"Tiwa (It's Our Own)" (Kuti)	5:51

Side 2
No.	Title	Length
3.	"Something Nice" (Bobby Tench, Baker)	4:21
4.	"Ju Ju" (Tench)	4:20
5.	"Blood Brothers 69" (Baker, Guy Warren)	8:00
6.	"Coda" (Baker)	2:46

== Personnel ==
- Ginger Baker - Drums, percussion, spoken word (6), effects (6)
- Fela Kuti - Organ (1 & 2), vocals (1 & 2), piano (3 & 4), choir (4)
- Bobby Tench - Bass (1–4), guitar (3 & 4), vocals (3 & 4)
- Alhaji JK Brimar - Percussion (1 & 2), choir (1, 2 & 4)
- Guy Warren - Drums (5)
- Damon Lyon-Shaw - Engineering (5)
- Dusty, Remi, Sandra - Choir (1–4)
