= List of Canadian number-one albums of 1969 =

In this page, there is the list of the Canadian number-one albums of 1969. The chart is compiled and published by RPM every Monday (except from August 2, when the chart is published every Saturday).

Issue date	Album	Artist
January 6	The Beatles	The Beatles
January 13	The Beatles	The Beatles
January 20	The Beatles	The Beatles
January 27	The Beatles	The Beatles
February 3	The Beatles	The Beatles
February 10	The Beatles	The Beatles
February 17	The Beatles	The Beatles
February 24	The Beatles	The Beatles
March 3	The Beatles	The Beatles
March 10	The Beatles	The Beatles
March 17	Yellow Submarine	The Beatles
March 24	Yellow Submarine	The Beatles
March 31	Blood, Sweat & Tears	Blood, Sweat & Tears
April 7	Hair	Soundtrack
April 14	Hair	Soundtrack
April 21	Hair	Soundtrack
April 28	Blood, Sweat & Tears	Blood, Sweat & Tears
May 5	Blood, Sweat & Tears	Blood, Sweat & Tears
May 12	Blood, Sweat & Tears	Blood, Sweat & Tears
May 19	Hair	Soundtrack
May 26	Hair	Soundtrack
June 2	Hair	Soundtrack
June 9	Hair	Soundtrack
June 16	Hair	Soundtrack
June 23	Hair	Soundtrack
June 30	Hair	Soundtrack
July 7	Hair	Soundtrack
July 14	Hair	Soundtrack
July 21	Hair	Soundtrack
July 28	Blood, Sweat & Tears	Blood, Sweat & Tears
August 2	Romeo & Juliet	Original Soundtrack
August 9	Hair	Soundtrack
August 16	Blood, Sweat & Tears	Blood, Sweat & Tears
August 23	Blood, Sweat & Tears	Blood, Sweat & Tears
August 30	Blood, Sweat & Tears	Blood, Sweat & Tears
September 6	Johnny Cash at San Quentin	Johnny Cash
September 13	Johnny Cash at San Quentin	Johnny Cash
September 20	Johnny Cash at San Quentin	Johnny Cash
September 27	Blind Faith	Blind Faith
October 4	Blind Faith	Blind Faith
October 11	Blind Faith	Blind Faith
October 18	Blind Faith	Blind Faith
October 25	Blind Faith	Blind Faith
November 1	Abbey Road	The Beatles
November 8	Abbey Road	The Beatles
November 15	Abbey Road	The Beatles
November 22	Abbey Road	The Beatles
November 29	Abbey Road	The Beatles
December 6	Abbey Road	The Beatles
December 13	Abbey Road	The Beatles
December 20	Abbey Road	The Beatles
December 27	Abbey Road	The Beatles

== See also ==
- 1969 in music
- RPM number-one hits of 1969
