= Ginger Baker's Air Force =

Jazz rock fusion supergroup led by drummer Ginger Baker

- Origin: London, England
- Genre: Jazz rock
- Years active: 1969–1971, 2015
- Labels: Atco; Polydor
- Past members: Ginger Baker; Graham Bond; Steve Winwood; Chris Wood; Denny Laine; Ric Grech; Remi Kabaka; Phil Seamen; Harold McNair; Jeanette Jacobs; Alan White; Eleanor Barooshian; Colin Gibson; Diane Stewart; Bud Beadle; Kenneth Craddock; Steve Gregory; Aliki Ashman; Rocky Dzidzornu; Neemoi "Speedy" Acquaye; Catherine James; Gasper Lawal; Johnny Haastrup

Ginger Baker's Air Force was a jazz rock fusion supergroup led by drummer Ginger Baker.

== History ==
The band formed in late 1969 upon the disbandment of Blind Faith. The original lineup consisted of Ginger Baker on drums, Steve Winwood on organ and vocals, Ric Grech on violin and bass, Jeanette Jacobs on vocals, Denny Laine on guitar and vocals, Phil Seamen on drums, Alan White on drums, Chris Wood on tenor sax and flute, Graham Bond on alto sax, Harold McNair on tenor sax and flute, and Remi Kabaka on percussion. Their first live shows, at Birmingham Town Hall in 1969 and the Royal Albert Hall, in 1970, also included Eleanor Barooshian (both Jacobs and Barooshian were former members of girl group The Cake).

The band released two albums, both in 1970: Ginger Baker's Air Force and Ginger Baker's Air Force 2. The second album involved substantially different personnel from the first, with Ginger Baker and Graham Bond being the primary constants between albums.

Ginger Baker's Air Force also played a set at Wembley Stadium (original) on 19 April 1970, during the start of the World Cup Rally, which went from London to Mexico City. They also played at the Hollywood Music Festival held at Leycett (near Newcastle-under-Lyme, Staffordshire, England), on 24 May 1970.

In late 2015 Baker announced he would be touring in 2016 with a new version of Ginger Baker's Air Force. The band booked a world tour under the name Ginger Baker's Air Force 3. Baker's blog said the band would be "showcasing new talent and collaborating with old friends." The band played one show in London on 26 January 2015; the performance was shortened and Baker had to take many breaks due to an injury he had previously sustained. In late February 2016 the entire tour was cancelled due to doctors having diagnosed Baker with "serious heart problems". Baker died in October 2019.

== Band members ==
=== Members ===
- Ginger Baker – drums, percussion, vocals (Jan. 1970 – Jan. 1971, 2015–2019; died 2019)
- Denny Laine – guitar, piano, vocals (Jan. 1970 – May 1970; died 2023)
- Ric Grech – bass, violin (Jan. 1970 – May 1970; died 1990)
- Harold McNair – saxophone, flute (Jan. 1970 – May 1970; died 1971)
- Chris Wood – saxophone, flute (Jan. 1970 – Mar.1970; died 1983)
- Graham Bond – saxophone, organ, piano, vocals (Jan. 1970 – Jan. 1971; died 1974)
- Phil Seamen – drums, percussion (Jan. 1970 – May 1970; died 1972)
- Steve Winwood – organ, bass, vocals (Jan. 1970 – Mar. 1970)
- Jeanette Jacobs – vocals (Jan. 1970 – May 1970; died 1982)
- Remi Kabaka – percussion, drums (Jan. 1970 – May 1970)
- Alan White – drums, piano (Mar. 1970 – May 1970; died 2022)
- Colin Gibson – bass, saxophone, guitar (Mar. 1970 – Jan. 1971)
- Diane Stewart – vocals (Mar. 1970 – Jan. 1971)
- Eleanor Barooshian – vocals (Mar. 1970 – May 1970; died 2016)
- Rocky Dzidzornu – percussion, congas (May 1970 – Sept. 1970; died 1993)
- Catherine James – vocals (May 1970 – Oct. 1970)
- Ken Craddock – guitar, organ, piano, vocals (Sept. 1970 – Jan. 1971; died 2002)
- Steve Gregory – saxophone, flute (Sept. 1970 – Jan. 1971)
- Bud Beadle – saxophone (Sept. 1970 – Jan.1971)
- Aliki Ashman – vocals (Sept. 1970 – Jan. 1971)
- Neemoi "Speedy" Acquaye – congas, percussion, drums (Sept. 1970 – Jan. 1971)
- Gasper Lawal – congas (Jan. 1971)
- Johnny Haastrup – vocals (Jan. 1971)

== Discography ==
=== Albums ===
- Ginger Baker's Air Force (Recorded Live at The Royal Albert Hall, London, 1970) LP X 2 Polydor – 2662 001 (1970) (UK)
- Ginger Baker's Air Force 2 (Recorded at Trident Studios, London, May and October 1970 and at Olympic Studios, London, September 1970) LP X 1 Polydor – 2383 029 (1970) (UK, USA, Italy)(Germany, France, Spain, Australia, New Zealand : different track listing)
- Live in Offenbach, Germany 1970 (Recorded Live in the Stadthalle, Offenbach Germany 1970) CD X 2 Voiceprint – VPTMQ055CD (2010) (UK)
- Do What You Like (Recorded Live at the Lyceum, London (UK) on 1 February 1971 and live at the City Hall, Sheffield (UK) on 7 December 1970 + studio outtakes, October 1970) CD X 1 ITM Archives ITM 920016 (2015) (UK)

=== Compilations ===
- Free Kings LP x1 Karussell – 2499 018 (1971) (Germany)
- Once Upon A Time LP X 2 RSO – 2658 138 (1972) (Germany)
- Pop Giants LP X 1 Brunswick – 2911 522 (1973) (Germany)
- Pop History LP X 2 Polydor – 2478 016/2478 017 (1974) (Germany)

=== Single ===
- Man of Constant Sorrow / Doin' It Polydor – 56380 (1970) (UK)

=== DVD ===
- Live 1970 (Filmed in 1970 for German television) DVD x 1, Stereo, NTSC, Gonzo Multimedia – HST035DVD (2010) (UK)
