= Rocky Dzidzornu =

Ghanaian percussionist (1932–1993)

- Dzidzornu playing with the Rolling Stones at the Rock and Roll Circus in 1968

Background information
- Also known as: Rocky Dijon
- Born: Kwasi Dzidzornu; 28 February 1932; Gold Coast
- Died: 13 March 1993 (aged 61) California, U.S.
- Genres: Rock; blues rock; funk; R&B; world music
- Occupation: Musician
- Instruments: Congas; percussion
- Years active: 1960s–1990s

Kwasi "Rocky" Dzidzornu (28 February 1932 – 13 March 1993), also known as Rocky Dijon, was a Ghanaian percussionist known for his 1960s and '70s work with rock and R&B artists.

== Biography ==
Dzidzornu was born in the British Gold Coast colony (later Ghana), on 28 February 1932. In the 1960s and 1970s, he played with acts such as the Rolling Stones, Nick Drake, Ginger Baker, Stevie Wonder, Billy Preston, Taj Mahal, and Joe Walsh.

In 1968, producer Jimmy Miller enlisted Dzidzornu to record with the Rolling Stones. He played on the albums Beggars Banquet (1968) and Let It Bleed (1969). He also appeared in The Rolling Stones Rock and Roll Circus concert and film. In 1971, he appeared on "Can't You Hear Me Knocking" from Sticky Fingers. Bill Wyman also enlisted him on his 1976 solo album Stone Alone.

War's drummer Harold Brown has named him as an important influence and also credits him with teaching Ginger Baker. Critic Ned Sublette has written that the addition of his conga drumming on "Sympathy for the Devil" transformed the song from "a dirge, and a dull one at that ... making it come alive".

Dzidzornu died in California on 13 March 1993.

== Selected discography ==
- 1968: The Rolling Stones, Beggars Banquet
- 1969: Nick Drake, Five Leaves Left
- 1969: The Rolling Stones, Let It Bleed
- 1970: John and Beverley Martyn, The Road to Ruin
- 1970: Ginger Baker's Air Force, Ginger Baker's Air Force 2
- 1970: Peter Bardens's Village, The Answer
- 1971: The Rolling Stones, Sticky Fingers
- 1971: Taj Mahal, The Real Thing
- 1971: Taj Mahal, Happy Just to Be Like I Am
- 1974: Stevie Wonder, Fulfillingness' First Finale
- 1974: Minnie Riperton, Perfect Angel
- 1974: Taj Mahal, Mo' Roots
- 1975: Taj Mahal, Music Keeps Me Together
- 1975: Billy Preston, It's My Pleasure
- 1975: Hugh Masekela, The Boys Don't Do It
- 1976: Bill Wyman, Stone Alone
- 1976: Joe Walsh, You Can't Argue with a Sick Mind
- 1976: Taj Mahal, Music Fuh Ya' (Musica Para Tu)
- 1977: Taj Mahal, Brothers
- 1981: Herbie Hancock, Magic Windows
- 1998: Ginger Baker, Do What You Like
- 2009: Jimi Hendrix, Valleys of Neptune
