= Music Keeps Me Together =

Studio album by Taj Mahal
- Released: 1975
- Studios: CBS Studios, San Francisco
- Genre: Blues
- Label: Columbia
- Producer: Taj Mahal

Taj Mahal chronology
Mo' Roots (1974)	Music Keeps Me Together (1975)	Satisfied 'N Tickled Too (1976)

Professional ratings
Review scores
Source	Rating
AllMusic	2/5 stars
Christgau's Record Guide	C+

Music Keeps Me Together is the eighth studio album by American blues artist Taj Mahal. The album was remixed at Sigma Sound Studios in Philadelphia by Jay Mark and Carl Paruolo.

== Track listing ==
All tracks composed by Taj Mahal; except where indicated

1. "Music Keeps Me Together" (Earl Lindo)
2. "When I Feel the Sea Beneath My Soul"
3. "Dear Ladies"
4. "Aristocracy" (poem: Inshirah Mahal; arranged and adapted by Taj Mahal)
5. "Further on Down the Road (You Will Accompany Me)" (lyrics: Taj Mahal; music: Taj Mahal, Chuck Blackwell, Jesse Ed Davis, Gary Gilmore)
6. "Roll, Turn, Spin" (Joseph Spence; arranged and adapted by Taj Mahal)
7. "West Indian Revelation"
8. "My Ancestors" (Demetriss Tapp)
9. "Brown Eyed Handsome Man" (Chuck Berry)
10. "Why?...And We Repeat/Why?...And We Repeat"

== Personnel ==
- Taj Mahal - vocals, guitar, banjo, piano, electric piano, mandolin
- Hoshal Wright - guitar
- Ray Fitzpatrick - bass
- Bill Rich - bass on "Why?...And We Repeat Why?...And We Repeat!"
- Earl Lindo - keyboards
- Kwasi Dzidzornu - congas on "Why?...And We Repeat Why?...And We Repeat!"
- Larry McDonald - percussion, congas
- Kester Smith - drums
- Rudy Costa - saxophone, clarinet
- "Sweet" Annie Sampson, Sister Carole Fredericks, Jo Baker - backing vocals
- Intergalactic Soul Messengers Band (ISMB) - ensemble
