= Eleanor Barooshian =

American musician (1950–2016)

Barooshian in 1967

Eleanor Barooshian (April 2, 1950 – August 30, 2016), also known as Eleanor Baruchian and as Chelsea Lee, was a member of the band the Cake (formed in New York in 1966).

== Career ==
One of five sisters, Eleanor was born in Weehawken, New Jersey; her parents were killed in an accident when she was 13. In the 1960s, Barooshian started out in Manhattan, New York, performing at Steve Paul's The Scene. She performed the Sonny & Cher hit "I Got You Babe" with Tiny Tim. She sang the male part, while Tiny Tim sang the female. The duo appeared in You Are What You Eat, a 1968 documentary film produced by Peter Yarrow. Yarrow cast them after seeing them perform at The Scene.

=== The Cake: 1966–1968 ===
In 1966, Jeanette Jacobs and Barbara Morillo recruited Barooshian to form their girl group The Cake. Based in Manhattan, New York, The Cake started out as an a cappella vocal trio, performing at The Scene. In 1967, the trio were discovered by producers Charles Greene and Brian Stone (Greene and Stone) at New York's Ondine Discotheque basement nightclub, located near the 59th Street bridge. The Cake signed with Decca and relocated to Los Angeles, California.

Barooshian was a songwriter, and wrote the majority of the group's songs, such as "Sadie" and "Island of Plenty".

In 1968, Barooshian contributed backing vocals to "Why Are We Sleeping?", a track on The Soft Machine, the 1968 debut album by the British psychedelic rock band of the same name.

=== Ginger Baker's Air Force: 1970 ===
Following the break-up of the Cake in 1968, Barooshian and fellow Cake member Jeanette Jacobs toured with Dr John, as his backing singers. They subsequently moved to London, UK, where they became part of Ginger Baker's Air Force. In 1970, she briefly joined Ginger Baker's Air Force, performing at their first live shows (March 1970 – May 1970), seen in April 1970, Copenhagen. She was not involved or credited on the 1970 album.

=== Tetsu: 1972 ===
In the early 1970s, Barooshian recorded an album in Japan with Tetsu Yamauchi titled Tetsu (1972). She contributed as a songwriter on the album and applied vocals on the songs "Wiki Wiki", "Alexandra Stone", "Who Would I Be in the World Babe", and "Baby Blue".

== Later years ==
Barooshian left the music scene, preferring to live in the United Kingdom. She married and went by the name Chelsea Lee. Later in life, she moved back to the United States, and took part in the 2006 reunion of The Cake.

== Influence ==
The Kevin Ayers song "Eleanor's Cake (Which Ate Her)" from the LP Joy of a Toy (1969) was written about Barooshian.

== Death ==
She died on August 30, 2016, at the age of 66.
