= List of number-one singles of 1969 (Canada) =

This is a list of the weekly Canadian RPM magazine (Note: The magazine's weekly record charts were digitized by the AV Trust. The collection is archived by Library and Archives Canada here. The PDF text search does not work unless you have additional software installed. You must view each entry on the chart for a match.) number one Top Singles chart of 1969. (Note: A collection of all the .pdf files cited is available here.) (Note: On 21 March 1966, the chart became the RPM 100, as expanded to the top 100 singles.)

Volume:Issue	Issue Date(s)	Song	Artist
10:19	6 January	"Wichita Lineman"	Glen Campbell
10:20	13 January	"Soulful Strut"	Young-Holt Unlimited
10:21	20 January	"I Started a Joke"	Bee Gees
10:22	27 January	"I Started a Joke"	Bee Gees
10:23	3 February	"Crimson and Clover"	Tommy James and the Shondells
10:24	10 February	"Touch Me"	The Doors
10:25	17 February	"Worst That Could Happen"	The Brooklyn Bridge
10:26	24 February	"Build Me Up Buttercup"	The Foundations
11:1	3 March	"You Showed Me"	The Turtles
11:2	10 March	"This Magic Moment"	Jay and the Americans
11:3	17 March	"Indian Giver"	1910 Fruitgum Company
11:4	24 March	"Dizzy"	Tommy Roe
11:5	31 March	"Time of the Season"	The Zombies
11:6	7 April	"Aquarius/Let the Sunshine In"	The 5th Dimension
11:7	14 April	"Aquarius/Let the Sunshine In"	The 5th Dimension
11:8	21 April	"Aquarius/Let the Sunshine In"	The 5th Dimension
11:9	28 April	"You've Made Me So Very Happy"	Blood, Sweat & Tears
11:10	5 May	"You've Made Me So Very Happy"	Blood, Sweat & Tears
11:11	12 May	"Hair"	The Cowsills
11:12	19 May	"Get Back"	The Beatles
11:13	26 May	"Get Back"	The Beatles
11:14	2 June	"Get Back"	The Beatles
11:15	9 June	"Get Back"	The Beatles
11:16	16 June	"Get Back"	The Beatles
11:17	23 June	"Get Back"	The Beatles
11:18	30 June	"Good Morning Starshine"	Oliver
11:19	7 July	"Spinning Wheel"	Blood, Sweat & Tears
11:20	14 July	"Spinning Wheel"	Blood, Sweat & Tears
11:21	21 July	"Spinning Wheel"	Blood, Sweat & Tears
11:23 (Note: Although the charts were corresponding, the archive numbered this as no. 23 instead of 22.)	28 July	"Crystal Blue Persuasion"	Tommy James and the Shondells
11:24	2 August	"In the Year 2525"	Zager and Evans
11:25	9 August	"Baby, I Love You"	Andy Kim
11:26	16 August	"Baby, I Love You"	Andy Kim
12:1	23 August	"When I Die"	Motherlode
12:2	30 August	"When I Die"	Motherlode
12:3	6 September	"Laughing"	The Guess Who
12:4	13 September	"Sugar, Sugar"	The Archies
12:5	20 September	"Sugar, Sugar"	The Archies
12:6	27 September	"Sugar, Sugar"	The Archies
12:7	4 October	"Jean"	Oliver
12:8	11 October	"Everybody's Talkin'"	Nilsson
12:9	18 October	"Suspicious Minds"	Elvis Presley
12:10	25 October	"Suspicious Minds"	Elvis Presley
12:11	1 November	"Suspicious Minds"	Elvis Presley
12:12	8 November	"Tracy"	The Cuff Links
12:13	15 November	"Something"	The Beatles
12:14	22 November	"Something"	The Beatles
12:15	29 November	"Something"	The Beatles
12:16	6 December	"Something"	The Beatles
12:17	13 December	"And When I Die"	Blood, Sweat & Tears
12:18	20 December	"And When I Die"	Blood, Sweat & Tears
12:19	27 December	"Leaving on a Jet Plane"	Peter, Paul and Mary

== See also ==
- 1969 in music
- List of Billboard Hot 100 number ones of 1969 (United States)
- List of Cashbox Top 100 number-one singles of 1969 (United States)
- List of Canadian number-one albums of 1969
