= Falling Off the Roof =

Studio album by Ginger Baker
- Released: 1996
- Genre: Jazz
- Label: Atlantic
- Producer: Ginger Baker, Malcolm Cecil

Ginger Baker chronology
Ginger Baker's Energy (1995)	Falling Off the Roof (1996)	Do What You Like (1998)

Falling Off the Roof is an album by the English musician Ginger Baker, released in 1996. It is credited to his trio, which included Charlie Haden on bass and Bill Frisell on guitar. It peaked at No. 13 on Billboard's Top Jazz Albums chart.

== Production ==
The album was produced by Baker and Malcolm Cecil and included original songs from each member of the trio. Baker fell off the roof of his Parker, Colorado, home three days prior to the start of the Seattle recording sessions; he played while dealing with the effects of a concussion and a broken rib. The album was finished in Los Angeles, in a studio next to one that was being used by Guns N' Roses. Baker liked neither the studio nor the musical style of the drummers used by Guns N' Roses. Jerry Hahn played guitar on "Sunday at the Hillcrest". Béla Fleck played banjo on three of the tracks. "Bemsha Swing" is a version of the Thelonious Monk composition. "Vino Vecchio" is a reworking of Cream's "Sweet Wine". "Au Privave" was written by Charlie Parker.

== Critical reception ==
Professional ratings
Review scores
Source	Rating
AllMusic	2.5/5 stars
The Buffalo News	4/5 stars
The Encyclopedia of Popular Music	4/5 stars
Houston Press	3.5/5 stars
Lincoln Journal Star	4/5 stars
MusicHound Jazz: The Essential Album Guide	3.5/5 stars
The Penguin Guide to Jazz on CD	3.5/4 stars

The Toronto Star noted that "it's the cranky Frisell melodics and harmonics, always on the edge but never over it, that attract". The Globe and Mail said that "Baker and Haden work wonderfully together at times ... but they can also bump along heavily, turning this esoteric set of originals and bebop classics ... into a rather hit-and-miss proposition." The Hartford Courant stated that the album "has a sparse, clear sound that effectively mixes elegance with power." The Ottawa Citizen opined that it "lacks the grace of its predecessor—substituting bombast for energy, and broad gestures for wry wit."

Stereo Review said that "the performances are trim and full of snap, thanks in no small part to the uncommon melodic lilt of Baker's rhythmic punctuations... He joins forces with Haden to lock in some irresistible grooves." The Pittsburgh Post-Gazette deemed Falling Off the Roof the seventh best jazz album of 1996; the album was also included on the Albuquerque Journal's list of the best jazz albums of the year.

The Encyclopedia of Popular Music noted, "Those who perceive Baker as the wild man of rock should investigate the excellent Falling Off the Roof".

== Track listing ==
No.	Title	Length
1.	"Falling Off the Roof"
2.	"Amarillo Barbados"
3.	"Bemsha Swing"
4.	"Sunday at the Hillcrest"
5.	"Au Privave"
6.	"Our Spanish Love Song"
7.	"C.B.C. Mimps"
8.	"Skeleton"
9.	"Vino Vecchio"
10.	"The Day the Sun Come Out"
11.	"Taney County"
