= Why? (Ginger Baker album) =

Studio album by Ginger Baker
- Released: 27 May 2014
- Genre: Jazz
- Length: 52:27
- Label: Motema Music
- Producer: Ginger Baker

Ginger Baker chronology
African Force: Palanquin's Pole (2006)	Why? (2014)

Professional ratings
Review scores
Source	Rating
AllMusic	3.5/5 stars

Why? is the final album by British drummer Ginger Baker. It was released in 2014 on Motema Music and was his first solo album in 16 years, as well as his final album.

== Track listing ==
1. "Ginger Spice" (Ron Miles) – 6:08
2. "12+ More Blues" (Alfred Ellis) – 7:25
3. "Cyril Davies" (Ginger Baker) – 6:44
4. "Footprints" (Wayne Shorter) – 6:56
5. "Aïn Témouchent" (Ginger Baker) – 6:46
6. "St. Thomas" (Sonny Rollins) – 6:04
7. "Aiko Biaye" (Traditional) – 7:28
8. "Why?" (Ginger Baker) – 4:45

== Personnel ==
- Ginger Baker – drums
- Pee Wee Ellis – saxophone
- Alec Dankworth – bass
- Abass Dodoo – percussion
