= Dancing the Blues =

Studio album by Taj Mahal
- Released: June 15, 1993
- Genre: Blues
- Length: 44:53
- Label: Private Music
- Producer: John Porter

Taj Mahal chronology
World Music (1993)	Dancing the Blues (1993)	An Evening of Acoustic Music (1994)

Dancing the Blues is an album by American blues artist Taj Mahal, released in 1993.

== Reception ==
Professional ratings
Review scores
Source	Rating
AllMusic	3/5 stars
The Penguin Guide to Blues Recordings	3/4 stars

Allmusic gave a positive review of the album, calling the music "inclusive" and "eclectic", and praising a number of the individual tracks.

== Track listing ==
1. "Blues Ain't Nothin'" (Taj Mahal) – 4:12
2. "Hard Way" (Grover McDaniel, T-Bone Walker) – 2:51
3. "Strut" (Mahal) – 3:39
4. "Going to the River" (Dave Bartholomew, Fats Domino) – 6:30
5. "Mockingbird" (Charlie Foxx, Inez Foxx) – 3:54
6. "Blue Light Boogie" (Jessie Mae Robinson) – 4:03
7. "The Hoochi Coochi Coo" (Hank Ballard, Billy Myles) – 2:54
8. "That's How Strong My Love Is" (Roosevelt Jamison) – 3:07
9. "Down Home Girl" (Arthur Butler, Jerry Leiber) – 3:40
10. "Stranger in My Own Home Town" (Percy Mayfield) – 2:42
11. "Sitting on Top of the World" (Lonnie Chatmon, Walter Vinson) – 3:28
12. "I'm Ready" (Sylvester Bradford, Fats Domino) – 3:53

CD Bonus Track

13. "I Can't Help Myself (Sugarpie Honeybunch)" (Brian Holland, Lamont Dozier & Edward Holland) – 2:43

== Personnel ==
- Taj Mahal – Lead Vocals, Organ, Guitar, Harmonica, Piano, Steel Guitar, Liner Notes
- Sir Harry Bowens – Background Vocals
- Tony Braunagel – Percussion, Drums
- Kurt DeMunbrun – Design
- Chuck Domanico – Upright Bass
- Jerry Finn – Second Engineer
- Bob Glaub – Bass
- Ron Goldstein – Executive Producer
- Marty Grebb – Alto, Baritone & Tenor Saxophone, Background Vocals
- Helix Hadar – Second Engineer
- Richie Hayward – Drums
- Etta James – Vocals
- William H. Johnson – Illustrations
- Darrell Leonard – Trombone, Trumpet, Trombonium
- Stephen Marcussen – Mastering
- Joe McGrath – Percussion, Engineer
- Ian McLagan – Organ, Piano
- Bill Payne – Piano
- Melanie Penny – Art Direction
- John Porter – Guitar, Producer
- Michito Sanchez – Percussion, Conga
- Johnny Lee Schell – Guitar, Background Vocals
- Joe Sublett – Soprano & Tenor Saxophone
- Texacali Horns – Horn
- Rich Veltrop – Second Engineer
- Robin Visotsky – Photography
- Mick Weaver – Organ
