= The Cake =

1960s American girl group

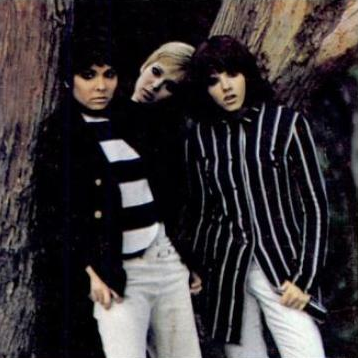
- The Cake in 1967 (left to right: Barbara Morillo, Eleanor Barooshian, and Jeanette Jacobs)

Background information
- Origin: New York, United States
- Genres: Baroque pop, psychedelic pop, R&B
- Years active: 1966–1968, 2006
- Label: Decca
- Past members: Jeanette Jacobs; Barbara Morillo; Eleanor Barooshian

The Cake was a 1960s girl group consisting of Jeanette Jacobs, Barbara Morillo and Eleanor Barooshian. They were managed and produced by Charles Greene and Brian Stone, two Sunset Strip impresarios who also managed Sonny & Cher, Buffalo Springfield and Iron Butterfly.

== History ==
=== The Cake: 1966–1968 ===
The Cake formed in Manhattan, New York in 1966. They started out as an a cappella vocal trio, performing at Steve Paul's The Scene. Barooshian performed the Sonny & Cher hit "I Got You Babe" with Tiny Tim. She sang the male part, while Tiny Tim sang the female. The duo appeared in You Are What You Eat, a 1968 documentary film produced by Peter Yarrow. Jacobs and Morillo recruited Barooshian, forming their androgynous, bohemian girl group the Cake.

In 1967, the trio were discovered by producers Charles Greene and Brian Stone (Greene and Stone) at New York's Ondine Discotheque basement nightclub, located near the 59th Street bridge. The Cake recorded the demos "Walking the Dog", "Something's Got a Hold on Me", and "Big Boy Pete", songs that did not necessarily reflect the group's sound. The Cake signed with Decca and relocated to Los Angeles, California.

Their debut single was the Jack Nitzsche-and-Jackie DeShannon–penned song "Baby, That's Me". The production of the song, which was arranged by Harold Battiste, mimicked the Wall of Sound technique created by Nitzsche and Phil Spector. Billboard named the song number 64 on their list of 100 Greatest Girl Group Songs of All Time.

The Cake recorded much of their own material, setting them apart from other girl groups of the time, and they also recorded R&B standards. Their own songs "Medieval Love", "Fire Fly" and "Rainbow Wood" were in the vein of 1960s baroque pop with intricate madrigal-style vocal harmonies. Their debut album, The Cake (1967), was released in December 1967 on Decca.

The group appeared on The Smothers Brothers Comedy Hour (performing "You Can Have Him"), Popendipity (performing "Mockingbird"), as well as on The Woody Woodbury Show, promoting their 1967 debut album release. There were a few scandals involved in the rehearsals and recording of these television appearances. For The Woody Woodbury Show, Barooshian wore an American flag t-shirt and when asked to change her shirt, Barooshian refused. As a result, she was not filmed during their performance on the show, the camera instead focusing on Jacobs and Morillo. There was also a scheduled television appearance of the Cake for the 1967 Miss Teenage America Pageant (performing "Rainbow Wood"). During rehearsals, it rained and became apparent that the group members were not wearing bras. The group were dropped from the bill. Teenage supporters of the Cake protested in front of the pageant's venue. The group's reputation was notorious.

Their second and final album, A Slice Of Cake, was released in 1968 on Decca. Both of the Cake's albums were recorded at the Gold Star Recording Studios in Los Angeles. But unlike their first album, all of the songs were originals with the majority written by Barooshian, supported by Battiste's folk and psychedelic arrangements. The song "P.T.280" was inspired by the group visiting the Who at the Beverly Hills Hotel, and the troubles of paying a taxi fare.

The Cake at Gold Star Studios

Their unsteady, conflicting relationship with managers Greene and Stone put a strain on the group. During the recording sessions, their managers had temporarily brought in a set of female singers with the intention of replacing the original members of the Cake—their harmonies can be heard on Barooshian's "Sadie". The uncredited harmony singers appeared on other songs with Jacobs on lead vocals, without the permission or involvement of Barooshian and Morillo. This tension pushed the three members apart. Greene and Stone salvaged what they could and released the album, without the girls' consent. They eventually departed from Los Angeles, with Jacobs and Barooshian headed for London.

In their time, the Cake were appreciated by Eric Burdon and guitarist Jimi Hendrix.

=== Post-breakup ===
Following the break-up of the Cake in 1968, Jacobs and Barooshian toured with Dr John, as his backing singers. New Orleans pianist Dr John, Malcolm John Rebennack, was a session musician on the Cake's albums.

==== Jeanette Jacobs ====
Jacobs married musician Chris Wood from the English group Traffic, in November 1972, at Kensington Register Office. Jacobs had first met Wood in late 1967, during the recording session of Jimi Hendrix's album Electric Ladyland (1968). She had briefly come to London, accompanying Hendrix. In 1969, Wood travelled to the US and joined Dr John on his tour, alongside Jacobs and Barooshian. In 1970, Jacobs followed Wood back to the UK, and became part of the supergroup Ginger Baker's Air Force. Jacobs appeared on the 1970 album Ginger Baker's Air Force, and sang on the songs "Da Da Man", "Early In The Morning", "Don't Care", "Aiko Biaye" and "Do What You Like". The married couple shared a West London flat, but Jacobs kept an open relationship and used drugs. She eventually left Wood in 1977. Jeanette Jacobs-Wood died on January 1, 1982, aged 32, from the effects of a fatal seizure. Towards the end of her life, Jacobs had regularly suffered with epilepsy. She had one son, Damien.

==== Eleanor Barooshian ====
In 1968, Barooshian contributed backing vocals to "Why Are We Sleeping?", a track on The Soft Machine, the 1968 debut album by the British psychedelic rock band of the same name. Barooshian relocated and lived in the UK, along with Jacobs. She briefly joined Ginger Baker's Air Force, performing at their first live shows (March–May 1970), seen in April 1970, Copenhagen. She was not involved or credited on the 1970 album. In the early 1970s, Barooshian recorded an album in Japan with Tetsu Yamauchi titled Tetsu (1972). She was a songwriter and applied vocals on the songs "Wiki Wiki", "Alexandra Stone", "Who Would I Be in the World Babe", and "Baby Blue". Later in life, she married and went by the name Chelsea Lee. Eleanor Barooshian died on August 30, 2016, aged 66.

==== Barbara Morillo ====
After disbanding in 1968, Morillo returned to New York, Metropolitan area. She began performing as a lead vocalist in a series of jazz groups including the Act (as a duo with Rahni Raines), Nightflyte (with Stephen Gaboury, Lincoln Goines, Kim Plainfield, Libby McLaren, and Roger Squitero), Ryo Kawasaki and the Golden Dragon, Bamboo (with Jason Shocair), and Triptic Soul (with violinist Karen Lee Larson). In the festive season, Morillo is part of the Carolling Carollers, an a capella group. Their CD won a New York Indie Award in 1997 as best album of the year. She is the leader of her own band, Barbara Morillo and Shrine.

== Influence ==
In 1967, the Cake was originally promoted with the line "the group that will be to music 1968 what the Beatles were to music 1964."

The Kevin Ayers song "Eleanor's Cake (Which Ate Her)" was written about Barooshian. The song appears on the album Joy of a Toy, released in 1969.

Jacobs was the inspiration for the Wings song "Medicine Jar". According to songwriter Colin Allen, "Medicine Jar was born out of my frustration, caused by Jeanette’s constant use of Mandies. The song’s line 'I know how you feel now your friends are dead' related to friends who had died because of drugs." The song was released in 1975, appearing on the Venus and Mars album.

Jacobs featured on the cover of TV Girl's Benny and the Jetts EP. The still was taken from the Cake's 1967 performance on the Smother Brothers Comedy Hour. "There's something about her that's so intriguing that's hard to pinpoint. She's stunningly beautiful but seems withdrawn and melancholy." The EP cover was meant to be a tribute to Jeanette and her mystical presence, but her bandmate Barooshian threatened legal action and the band TV Girl took down the image.

== Reunion ==
In 2006, after a thirty seven-year hiatus, Barooshian and Morillo reformed the Cake, to perform at a one-off Jimi Hendrix tribute concert in New York, held at the B.B. King Blues Club and organized by Hendrix archivist and documentary film-maker, David Kramer. The show also featured Buddy Miles, Johnny Winter, Jose Feliciano and Leon Hendrix. At the time, the Cake were interviewed for the Karmer Jimi Hendrix documentary, scheduled to be released in April 2024.

In 2017, the sole surviving member of the Cake, Morillo, performed live at the Stonewall Veterans Association Annual Conference on June 6, 2017. She sung "Baby, That's Me" and "What'd I Say".

Their two Decca albums have since been re-released on CD by Rev-Ola Records. A compilation album More of Cake Please, contains both albums. The only bonus track is a stereo version of "Baby, That's Me".

== Discography ==
=== Studio albums ===
- The Cake (Decca, 1967)
- A Slice of Cake (Decca, 1968)

=== Compilation ===
- More of Cake Please (Rev-Ola/Cherry Red, 2007)

=== Singles ===
- "Baby, That's Me" / "Mockingbird" (Decca, 1967)
- "You Can Have Him" / "I Know" (Decca, 1967)
- "Rainbow Wood" / "Fire Fly" (Decca, 1968)
- "Have You Heard The News 'Bout Miss Molly" / "P.T. 280" (Decca, 1968)
