= Music Fuh Ya' (Musica Para Tu) =

Studio album by Taj Mahal
- Released: 1977
- Studios: Blue Bear, San Francisco
- Genre: Blues
- Label: Warner Bros.
- Producer: Taj Mahal

Taj Mahal chronology
Satisfied 'n Tickled Too (1976)	Music Fuh Ya' (Musica Para Tu) (1977)	Brothers (1977 soundtrack) (1977)

Professional ratings
Review scores
Source	Rating
AllMusic	2.5/5 stars
Christgau's Record Guide	B
MusicHound Rock: The Essential Album Guide	4.5/5 stars
The New Rolling Stone Record Guide	1/5 stars

Music Fuh Ya' (Musica Para Tu) is an album by American blues artist Taj Mahal, released in 1977. It peaked at No. 134 on the Billboard 200.

== Track listing ==
All tracks composed and arranged by Taj Mahal; except where indicated

1. "You Got It"
2. "Freight Train" (Elizabeth Cotten)
3. "Baby, You're My Destiny"
4. "Sailin' into Walkers Cay"
5. "Truck Driver's Two Step"
6. "The Four Mills Brothers" (Durrie Parks)
7. "Honey Babe"
8. "Curry" (Ray Fitzpatrick)

== Personnel ==
- Taj Mahal – vocals, acoustic guitar, harmonica, banjo, mandolin
- Ray Fitzpatrick – bass, acoustic guitar, piano
- Rudy Costa – saxophone, bass, clarinet, flute, kalimba
- Larry McDonald – percussion, piano
- Kwasi Dzidzornu – congas, percussion
- Kester Smith – drums, percussion
- Robert Greenidge – steel drums
