= Blind Faith =

English rock supergroup (1969)

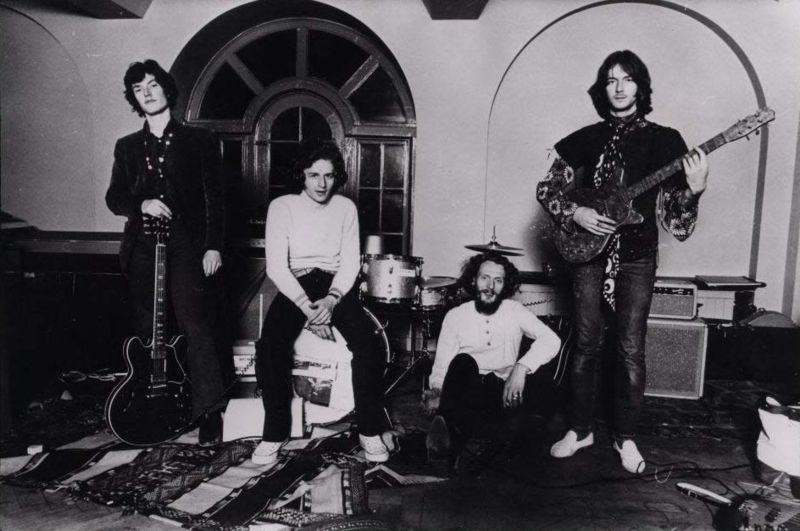
- Left to right: Steve Winwood, Ric Grech, Ginger Baker, Eric Clapton

Background information
- Origin: Ripley, Surrey, England
- Genres: Psychedelic rock; blues rock
- Years active: 1969
- Labels: Polydor; Island; RSO; ATCO
- Spinoffs: Ginger Baker's Air Force
- Spinoff of: Cream; Traffic
- Past members: Eric Clapton; Steve Winwood; Ginger Baker; Ric Grech

Blind Faith were an English rock supergroup that consisted of Steve Winwood, Eric Clapton, Ginger Baker, and Ric Grech. They followed the success of the members' former bands, including Clapton and Baker's former group Cream and Winwood's former group Traffic, but they disbanded after a few months, producing only one album and a three-month summer tour.

The group originated with informal jamming by Clapton and Winwood in early 1969 following the break-ups of Cream and Traffic. Baker joined them in rehearsals and they decided to form a group. Grech joined as the fourth member from the band Family in May, and they began recording their debut album, Blind Faith. It drew controversy for featuring a photograph of a topless 11-year-old girl on the front cover, which was quickly withdrawn and reissued with a different cover in the United States.

The first Blind Faith concert was on 7 June in front of an estimated 100,000 fans in Hyde Park, London, but they felt that they had not rehearsed enough and were unprepared. They subsequently played concerts in Scandinavia and the United States, but the lack of material in the live set led them to play old Cream and Traffic songs which pleased the audience but disillusioned the band. Clapton became increasingly isolated during the tour, preferring to spend time with support act Delaney & Bonnie, and Blind Faith disbanded immediately after their last performance. Clapton and Winwood both enjoyed the music that they played together in the group's limited time, and they have since collaborated on several tours playing Blind Faith material.

== Formation and early history ==
The origins of Blind Faith lay in the break-up of Cream in late 1968. The trio was a major critical and commercial success, with millions of record sales in a few years, bringing international popularity to the group and each member. However, the band was crumbling from within, because of frequent animosity between bassist Jack Bruce and drummer Ginger Baker, with Eric Clapton doing his best to mediate. Additionally, Clapton grew tired of playing commercially driven blues and hoped to progress with a new, experimental, less straitjacketed approach to the genre. The group disbanded in November 1968 following two concerts at the Royal Albert Hall.

Steve Winwood had faced similar problems to Clapton in the Spencer Davis Group, where he had been the lead singer for three years. Winwood wanted to experiment with the band's sound by infusing jazz elements, but left due to his musical differences, instead forming a new band, Traffic, in 1967. While that band was on hiatus in Christmas 1968, Winwood started to jam with his good friend Clapton in the latter's basement in Surrey, England. (Note: Clapton and Winwood had previously collaborated on the "Powerhouse" project, and Clapton had joined the Spencer Davis Group onstage at The Marquee club in London.) Clapton was pleased with the jam sessions with Winwood, but was hesitant to start a serious group. The music press were hopeful that Clapton would form a band even better than Cream. At one point, Clapton and Winwood thought they might record with Duck Dunn and Al Jackson Jr., the rhythm section of Booker T. & the M.G.'s.

In early 1969, Clapton and Winwood moved to Traffic's rehearsal cottage in Aston Tirrold, Berkshire. Baker turned up one day to sit in with them, and the three seriously considered forming a group. Clapton questioned letting Baker in the band, because he had promised Bruce that, if they were to work with one another again, all three of them would play. Clapton did not want to reunite with Cream barely nine weeks after the break-up, and did not want to deal with another band whose members had large reputations individually.

Winwood ultimately persuaded Clapton to finalize Baker's inclusion in the line-up, arguing that Baker strengthened their musicianship and that it would be hard to find an equally talented drummer. Traffic was put on hold and the other remaining members, multi-instrumentalist Chris Wood and drummer / singer Jim Capaldi, were informed. Winwood later realised that Clapton would probably have rather had Capaldi in the new group instead of Baker.

Clapton and Winwood's respective managers, Robert Stigwood and Chris Blackwell, said they would be happy to manage the new band. This created immediate tension; Stigwood wanted a quick money-making formula, while the band wanted time to write songs and develop as a unit. Winwood later said, "they wanted a supergroup and we didn't".

The formation of the group was announced to the press on 8 February 1969. By May, Ric Grech, bassist with Family, was invited to join them. He left Family midway through a US tour, causing considerable acrimony with the rest of the group. The new band's name was confirmed as "Blind Faith" around this time by Clapton, who thought it described everyone's self-belief that the band would be successful, no matter what happened.

== Recording ==
"Presence of the Lord"
29 second sample of the song "Presence of the Lord" as performed by Blind Faith

Because Winwood was signed to Island Records, he had to obtain permission from Blackwell, who owned the label, to appear on Polydor Records, to whom Clapton and Baker were signed in the U.K. A promotional single was released by Island, although the promotion was for the label itself. It was a single announcing the fact that they were moving their offices, titled "Change Of Address From 23 June 1969".

This one-sided promo featured an instrumental jam by Blind Faith, who were not mentioned on the label. The only other label info is the new address, phone number, and new cable address of Island. Recorded at Olympic Studios during session for the debut album, an estimated 500 copies of the single were pressed, and mostly sent to UK disc jockeys and other music industry insiders. The track was finally released widely when it appeared as a bonus track on the two-CD "Deluxe Edition" of the Blind Faith album in 2000, titled "Change Of Address Jam".

Upon its release in July 1969, the band's first and only album Blind Faith topped both the UK chart and Billboard's chart for Pop Album in the U.S. The album sold more than half a million copies in the first month of its release and helped rejuvenate sales of Cream albums. Best of Cream reached No. 3 in the Billboard charts at the same time that Blind Faith was at the top.

The cover art for the album was created by photographer Bob Seidemann, a personal friend and former flatmate of Clapton, who is known primarily for his photos of Janis Joplin and the Grateful Dead. The cover was nameless – only the wrapping paper told the buyer who the artist was and the name of the album. It provoked controversy because it featured a topless 11-year-old girl, holding in her hands a silver space ship. The US record company issued it with an alternative cover with a photograph of the band on the front. The model on the cover posed upon consent by her parents and was paid £40 (£581 as of 2025) for the shot.

During 2000 the entire album was remastered and re-released as a two-CD deluxe edition from Polydor that includes alternate takes, out-takes and studio rehearsal versions of the band's music created during the early months of 1969.

== Touring ==
News of Blind Faith's formation created a buzz of excitement among the public and press. The group debuted at a free concert at London's Hyde Park on 7 June 1969 in front of 100,000 fans. Capaldi and Wood attended the gig, as did Mick Jagger and Marianne Faithfull. The setlist contained all six numbers that would appear on the debut album, along with a cover of the Rolling Stones' "Under My Thumb", Traffic's "Means to an End", and Sam Myers' "Sleeping in the Ground". The performance was well received by fans, but troubled Clapton, who thought that the band's playing was sub-par. He spent much of the gig close to his amplifiers and not coming forward on stage; only Baker supplied any showmanship and theatrics during the set.

Though the group were still developing, their management insisted they continue touring to provide income. Clapton, knowing the band had not rehearsed enough and was unprepared, was reluctant to tour, but agreed to do so because he could collaborate with Winwood and had no better work offers. The recording of their album continued, followed by a short tour of Scandinavia, where the band played smaller gigs and was able to rehearse their sound and prepare it for bigger audiences in the US and UK. After Scandinavia, the band toured the United States, making their debut at Madison Square Garden on 12 July.

A major problem with the tour was that the band had only a few songs in their repertoire, barely enough to fill an hour, which the audience did not know well. Clapton in particular was against any lengthy jamming, which had been Cream's trademark, which would have allowed them to stretch out a set to a sufficient length. The group were forced to play old Cream and Traffic songs, to the delight of a crowd which usually preferred the old hits to the new Blind Faith material. Clapton resented being in a popular supergroup when he had intended to start a more low-key project. They were playing the same material from his Cream days, to please the audience and to fill the void left by the lack of adequate new material. Clapton wanted to play the Woodstock Festival, which occurred during the tour, but was outvoted by the rest of the group.

The tour was supported by opening acts Free, Taste, and R&B-based rock act Delaney & Bonnie. Because Clapton liked the soulful, folksy-sounding blues of Delaney & Bonnie, he began spending most of his time with them instead of Blind Faith, letting Winwood take a more prominent role in the band. Clapton even began sitting in on Delaney & Bonnie's opening sets, sometimes simply playing percussion, and showing more interest in them than his own band. He also wanted them to be the headliners instead of Blind Faith.

The band toured for seven more weeks in the US, finishing in Hawaii on 24 August. After the gig, Clapton and Winwood decided to end the group. Grech was immediately informed, but Baker did not find out until he had returned to England following a short holiday in Jamaica. When he finally got home to the UK, he met with Winwood and was upset to find that the band had disbanded.

== Aftermath ==
After the tour finished in August, various press reports speculated on future band activity, with Stigwood announcing that there would be further tours forthcoming. In October, the band issued a press release saying they had disbanded. There was no further activity from the group, though several tracks from the band can be found on Steve Winwood's 1995 retrospective album The Finer Things. In 2005, the live album London Hyde Park 1969 was released, documenting the entire concert at the park.

Clapton had mixed feelings about ending the group, and felt guilty about abandoning a project that Winwood had put more involvement into than himself. He stepped out of the spotlight, first to sit in with the Plastic Ono Band, and then to tour as a sideman for Delaney & Bonnie and Friends. This freed him of the attention that he had considered a plague to both Cream and Blind Faith. After his sideman stint, he took several members from Delaney & Bonnie to form a new super-group, Derek and the Dominos. He never dropped his Blind Faith repertoire completely, and occasionally performed "Presence of the Lord" and "Can't Find My Way Home" throughout his solo career.

Unlike Clapton, Baker had enjoyed his Blind Faith experience and looked to carry on an offshoot of the band in the form of Ginger Baker's Air Force with both Grech and Winwood. After a few shows together, Winwood left to record a solo album Mad Shadows, which turned into the Traffic album John Barleycorn Must Die. Clapton turned up backstage to a Traffic gig in 1970 and played dual lead guitar with Winwood on "Dear Mr. Fantasy", fuelling rumours of a reunion of the pair. Grech joined Traffic's touring band after the album was released, and played on the Traffic albums The Low Spark of High Heeled Boys and Welcome to the Canteen. Winwood would later go on to have a successful solo career, and Grech was a member of various groups before his death in 1990. Baker died on 6 October 2019, leaving Winwood and Clapton as the only two surviving members of Blind Faith.

== Clapton and Winwood reunions ==
Clapton and Winwood performed together again on stage as part of the Action for Research into Multiple Sclerosis (ARMS) tour in 1983. The shows were a benefit for former Small Faces and Faces member Ronnie Lane, who was suffering from the syndrome.

In July 2007, Clapton and Winwood reunited for a performance during the second Crossroads Guitar Festival held at the Toyota Park Center (later SeatGeek Stadium) of Bridgeview, Illinois, where the duo performed a number of Blind Faith songs as part of their set. That performance inspired the two to perform three reunion concerts at Madison Square Garden that took place on 25, 26 and 28 February 2008. It was not an official Blind Faith reunion, but simply "Winwood and Clapton". They performed the four songs on the first side of Blind Faith as well as selections from Traffic, Derek and the Dominos, Clapton's solo career and some covers. A DVD and a two-disc CD of these performances was released in 2009.

On 10 June 2009, Winwood and Clapton began a 14-date United States summer tour at the Izod Center in New Jersey, again including Blind Faith material in their setlist. Winwood and Clapton met again for a series of five concerts at London's Royal Albert Hall from 26 May to 1 June 2011. Clapton and Winwood both returned to play Hyde Park on 8 July 2018, though they performed separately.

In February 2020, Clapton and Winwood played a selection of Blind Faith material at a tribute gig to Baker at the Eventim Apollo.

== Members ==
- Steve Winwood – lead vocals, keyboards, lead guitar
- Eric Clapton – lead guitar, vocals
- Ric Grech – bass guitar, violin
- Ginger Baker – drums, percussion

== Discography ==
=== Album ===
- Blind Faith (1969)

=== Singles ===
- "Well All Right" / "Can't Find My Way Home" (1969) No. 20 NLD
- "Change of Address" / "Sales Office" (promotional single) (1969)

== Filmography ==
Film
Year	Title	Director
1970	Cucumber Castle	Hugh Gladwish

Videography
Year	Title
1969	London Hyde Park 1969

== See also ==
- List of Blind Faith concerts
