= Brothers (1977 soundtrack) =

Soundtrack album by Taj Mahal
- Released: 1977
- Recorded: August 1976
- Studio: Conway (Hollywood)
- Genre: Blues
- Length: 41:05
- Label: Warner Bros.
- Producer: Taj Mahal

Taj Mahal chronology
Music Fuh Ya' (Musica Para Tu) (1976)	Brothers (1977)	Evolution (The Most Recent) (1977)

Professional ratings
Review scores
Source	Rating
AllMusic	2/5 stars
Christgau's Record Guide	C−

Brothers is an album by American blues singer-songwriter and instrumentalist Taj Mahal. It was recorded in August 1976 at Conway Recording Studios in Hollywood and released the following year by Warner Bros. Records. It is the soundtrack to the 1977 film Brothers, with songs that music critic Richie Unterberger described as being "in the mode that Mahal was usually immersed in during the mid-1970s: bluesy, low-key tunes with a lot of Caribbean influence, particularly in the steel drums."

== Track listing ==
1. "Love Theme in the Key of D"
2. "Funky Butt"
3. "Brother's Doin' Time"
4. "Night Rider"
5. "Free the Brothers"
6. "Sentidos Dulce (Sweet Feelings)"
7. "Funeral March"
8. "Malcolm's Song"
9. "David and Angela"

== Personnel ==
Credits are adapted from AllMusic.

- Rudy Costa – Arranger, Bass, Clarinet, Flute, Flute (Alto), Kalimba, Musician, Sax (Alto), Sax (Soprano), Shekere, Vocals (Background), Wind
- Kwasi "Rocky" Dzidzornu – Arranger, Congas, Musician, Percussion, Vocals (Background)
- Ray Fitzpatrick – Arranger, Bass, Guitar, Keyboards, Musician, Vocals, Vocals (Background)
- Robert Greenidge – Arranger, Drums, Drums (Steel), Musician, Percussion, Vocals, Vocals (Background)
- Claudia Lennear – Vocals, Vocals (Background)
- Taj Mahal – Arranger, Banjo, Composer, Guitar, Harmonica, Musician, National Steel Guitar, Performer, Piano, Piano (Electric), Primary Artist, Producer, Vocals
- Larry McDonald – Arranger, Congas, Keyboards, Musician, Percussion, Vocals (Background)
- Alison Mills – Vocals, Vocals (Background)
- Kester Smith – Arranger, Musician, Percussion, Trap Kit, Vocals (Background)
