= Ginger Baker's Air Force (album) =

Live album by Ginger Baker's Air Force
- Released: 30 March 1970
- Recorded: 15 January 1970
- Venues: Royal Albert Hall, South Kensington, London
- Genres: Jazz-rock, Afro-fusion, blues rock
- Length: 78:02
- Labels: Polydor (UK & Canada); Atco (US)
- Producers: Ginger Baker, Jimmy Miller

Ginger Baker's Air Force chronology
Ginger Baker's Air Force (1970)	Ginger Baker's Air Force 2 (1970)

Professional ratings
Review scores
Source	Rating
AllMusic	4.5/5 stars
Christgau's Record Guide	D+

Ginger Baker's Air Force is the debut album by Ginger Baker's Air Force, released in 1970. This album is a recording of a sold-out live show at the Royal Albert Hall, on 15 January 1970, with the original ten-piece line up. The gatefold LP cover was designed left-handed, i.e., the front cover artwork was on what traditionally would be considered the back and vice versa.

== Critical reception ==
The album was not well received by critics, including Greil Marcus of Rolling Stone and Village Voice critic Robert Christgau, who found the sound quality "terrible" and complained that "bands led by drummers tend to leave a lot of space for drum solos". By contrast, Bruce Eder from AllMusic later said the album sounded good for a Royal Albert Hall recording and called it "a must-own for jazz-rock, Afro-fusion, blues-rock, or percussion fans".

== Track listing ==
Side 1
No.	Title	Writer(s)	Length
1.	"Da Da Man"	Harold McNair	7:16
2.	"Early in the Morning"	Traditional; arranged by Ginger Baker	11:13

Side 2
No.	Title	Writer(s)	Length
3.	"Don't Care"	Baker, Steve Winwood	12:32
4.	"Toad"	Baker	12:59

Side 3
No.	Title	Writer(s)	Length
5.	"Aiko Biaye"	Remi Kabaka, Teddy Osei	13:00
6.	"Man of Constant Sorrow"	Traditional; arranged by Denny Laine	3:50

Side 4
No.	Title	Writer(s)	Length
7.	"Do What You Like"	Baker	11:47
8.	"Doin' It"	Baker, Ric Grech	5:26

== Personnel ==
=== Musicians ===
- Ginger Baker – drums (all tracks), percussion (all tracks), timpani (all tracks), vocals ("Early in the Morning")
- Denny Laine – guitars, vocals ("Early in the Morning", "Man of Constant Sorrow")
- Ric Grech – bass guitar, violin ("Man of Constant Sorrow")
- Steve Winwood – Hammond organ, bass guitar ("Man of Constant Sorrow"), vocals ("Don't Care" and "Do What You Like")
- Chris Wood – tenor saxophone, flute
- Graham Bond – Hammond organ, alto saxophone ("Da Da Man"), vocals ("Aiko Biaye")
- Harold McNair – tenor and alto saxophones, alto flute
- Jeanette Jacobs – vocals ("Da Da Man" and "Don't Care")
- Remi Kabaka – drums, percussion ("Toad")
- Phil Seamen – drums, percussion ("Toad")

=== Production ===
- Ginger Baker – producer
- Jimmy Miller – producer
- Roy Thomas Baker – engineer
- Andy Johns – engineer
- Nigel Williamson – liner notes
- Russ Landau – reissue coordination

== Charts ==
Chart (1970)	Peak position
UK Albums (Official Charts)	37
US Billboard 200	33
