= Mo' Roots (Taj Mahal album) =

Studio album by Taj Mahal
- Released: 1974
- Recorded: CBS Studios, San Francisco, California
- Genre: Cajun
- Length: 33:57
- Label: Columbia
- Producer: Taj Mahal

Taj Mahal chronology
Oooh So Good 'n Blues (1973)	Mo' Roots (1974)	Music Keeps Me Together (1975)

Professional ratings
Review scores
Source	Rating
AllMusic	3/5 stars
Christgau's Record Guide	B+
The Penguin Guide to Blues Recordings	2.5/4 stars
Tom Hull	B+
DownBeat	2/5 stars

Mo' Roots is the seventh studio album by American blues artist Taj Mahal. The musician turned away from his normal fare to record a reggae inspired collection.

== Track listing ==
All tracks composed by Taj Mahal; except where indicated

1. "Johnny Too Bad" (Delroy Wilson, Winston Bailey, Hylton Beckford, Derrick Crooks)
2. "Black Jack Davey"
3. "Big Mama"
4. "Cajun Waltz"
5. "Slave Driver" (Bob Marley)
6. "Why Did You Have to Desert Me?"
7. "Desperate Lover" (Bob Andy)
8. "Clara (St. Kitts Woman)"

== Personnel ==
- Taj Mahal - vocals
- Hoshal Wright - guitar
- Bill Rich - bass
- Merl Saunders - organ
- Aston "Family Man" Barrett - ska piano
- Kwasi "Rocki" Dzidzornu - percussion, congas
- Kester Smith - trap drums
- Rudy Costa - soprano saxophone, flute
- Sister Carole Fredericks, Sister Claudia Lennear, Brother Tommy Henderson - backing vocals
