= Blind Faith (Blind Faith album) =

1969 album by Blind Faith

Studio album by Blind Faith
- Released: 9 August 1969
- Recorded: 20 February – 28 June 1969
- Studios: Olympic, London; Morgan, London
- Genres: Psychedelic rock; blues rock
- Length: 42:01
- Label: Polydor
- Producer: Jimmy Miller

Eric Clapton chronology
Best of Cream (1969)	Blind Faith (1969)	On Tour with Eric Clapton (1970)

Alternative cover
- US cover

Blind Faith is the only studio album by the English supergroup Blind Faith, originally released in the United States on 9 August 1969 on Atco Records, and in the United Kingdom on 22 August 1969 on Polydor Records and in Europe. It topped the album charts in the UK, Canada and US, and was listed at No. 40 on the US Soul Albums chart. It has been certified platinum by the RIAA.

== Background ==
The band contained two-thirds of the popular power trio Cream, in Ginger Baker and Eric Clapton, working in collaboration with British star Steve Winwood of the Spencer Davis Group and Traffic, along with Ric Grech of Family. They began to work out songs early in 1969, and in February and March the group was at Morgan Studios in London, although the first few almost-finished songs did not show up until they were at Olympic Studios in April and May under the direction of producer Jimmy Miller.

The recording of their album was interrupted by a tour of Scandinavia, then a US tour from 11 July (Newport) to 24 August (Hawaii), supported by Free, Taste and Delaney & Bonnie and Friends. Although a chart topper, the LP was recorded hurriedly and side two consisted of just two songs, one of them a 15-minute jam entitled "Do What You Like". Nevertheless, the band produced two hits, Winwood's "Can't Find My Way Home" and Clapton's "Presence of the Lord".

== Album cover ==
The cover was a photo by Bob Seidemann of a topless 11-year-old girl, Mariora Goschen, holding a silver-painted model of an aircraft, sculpted for the album shoot by Mick Milligan. The cover was mildly controversial in the British press, with some seeing the model aeroplane as phallic.

Seidemann wrote that he approached a girl, reported to be 14 years old, on the London Underground, asking her to model for the cover. He eventually met her parents, but she proved to be too old for the effect he wanted. Instead, the model he used was her younger sister, Mariora Goschen, who was reported to be 11 years old. Goschen recalled that she was coerced into posing for the picture. "My sister said, 'They'll give you a young horse. Do it!'" She was instead paid £40 (equivalent to £581.2 in 2025)

In America, Atco Records used a cover based on elements from a flyer for the band's Hyde Park concert of 7 June 1969.

== Release history ==
The album was released on vinyl in 1969 on Polydor Records in the UK and Europe, and on Atco Records in the US. Polydor released a compact disc in 1986, adding two previously unreleased tracks, "Exchange and Mart" and "Spending All My Days", recorded by Ric Grech for an unfinished solo album, supported by George Harrison, Denny Laine, and Trevor Burton.

An expanded edition of the album was released on 9 January 2001, with previously unreleased tracks and 'jams' included. The studio electric version of "Sleeping in the Ground" had previously been released on the four-disc boxed set for Clapton, Crossroads (released 1988, recorded 1963–1987, including several previously unreleased live or alternate studio recordings). The bonus disc of jams does not include bassist Grech, who had yet to join the band, but includes a guest percussionist, Guy Warner. Two live tracks from the 1969 Hyde Park concert not included here, "Sleeping in the Ground" and a cover of "Under My Thumb", are also available on Winwood's four-disc retrospective The Finer Things.

== Reception ==
Professional ratings
Review scores
Source	Rating
AllMusic	4/5 stars
Encyclopedia of Popular Music	4/5 stars
The Great Rock Discography	7/10
Louder	4.5/5 stars
MusicHound Rock	3.5/5
Music Story	4/5 stars
Q	4/5 stars
The Rolling Stone Album Guide	4/5 stars
The Village Voice	B

Commercially, Blind Faith charted at number one in both the US and the UK.

The album met with a mixed response from critics. Reviewing in August 1969 for The Village Voice, Robert Christgau found none of the songs exceptional and said, "I'm almost sure that when I'm through writing this I'll put the album away and only play it for guests. Unless I want to hear Clapton—‌he is at his best here because he is kept in check by the excesses of Winwood, who is rapidly turning into the greatest wasted talent in music. There. I said it and I'm glad." In Rolling Stone, Ed Leimbacher said of the quality, "not as much as I'd hoped, yet better than I'd expected." His colleagues at the magazine—‌Lester Bangs and John Morthland—‌were more impressed, especially Bangs in his appraisal of Clapton: "[With] Blind Faith, Clapton appears to have found his groove at last. Every solo is a model of economy, well- thought-out and well-executed with a good deal more subtlety and feeling than we have come to expect from Clapton."

Retrospective appraisals have been positive. According to Stereo Review in 1988, "for 20 years this has been a cornerstone in any basic rock library." AllMusic's Bruce Eder regarded the album as "one of the jewels of the Eric Clapton, Steve Winwood, and Ginger Baker catalogs". In 2016, Blind Faith was ranked 14th on Rolling Stone's list of "The 40 Greatest One Album Wonders", which described "Can't Find My Way Home" and "Presence of the Lord" as "incredible".

== Track listing ==
Side one
No.	Title	Writer(s)	Length
1.	"Had to Cry Today"	Steve Winwood	8:48
2.	"Can't Find My Way Home"	Winwood	3:16
3.	"Well All Right"	Buddy Holly; Jerry Allison; Joe B. Mauldin; Norman Petty	4:27
4.	"Presence of the Lord"	Eric Clapton	4:50
Total length:			21:21

Side two
No.	Title	Writer(s)	Length
5.	"Sea of Joy"	Winwood	5:22
6.	"Do What You Like"	Ginger Baker	15:18
Total length:			20:40 42:01

1986 CD bonus tracks
No.	Title	Writer(s)	Length
7.	"Exchange and Mart"	Ric Grech	4:18
8.	"Spending All My Days"	Grech	3:03
Total length:			49:22

=== Deluxe edition ===
2001 bonus tracks
No.	Title	Writer(s)	Length
7.	"Sleeping in the Ground"	Sam Myers	2:49
8.	"Can't Find My Way Home" (Electric version)	Winwood	5:40
9.	"Acoustic Jam"	Winwood; Clapton; Baker; Grech	15:50
10.	"Time Winds"	Winwood	3:15
11.	"Sleeping in the Ground" (Slow blues version)	Myers	4:44
Total length:			74:19

2001 bonus disc
No.	Title	Writer(s)	Length
1.	"Jam No. 1: Very Long & Good Jam"	Winwood; Clapton; Baker	14:01
2.	"Jam No. 2: Slow Jam No. 1"	Winwood; Clapton; Baker	15:06
3.	"Jam No. 3: Change of Address Jam"	Winwood; Clapton; Baker	12:06
4.	"Jam No. 4: Slow Jam No. 2"	Winwood; Clapton; Baker	16:06
Total length:			57:19

== Personnel ==
Blind Faith

- Steve Winwood – keyboards, lead vocals, guitars; bass guitar on "Presence of the Lord" and "Well All Right"; autoharp on "Sea of Joy"; bass pedals on "Jam No. 1–4"
- Eric Clapton – guitars; lead vocals on "Well All Right" and "Do What You Like"
- Ric Grech – bass guitar, violin on "Sea of Joy"; vocals on "Do What You Like"
- Ginger Baker – drums, percussion; vocals on "Do What You Like"

Guest

- Guy Warren – percussion on "Jam No. 1–4"

Production personnel

- Jimmy Miller – producer
- George Chkiantz, Keith Harwood, Andy Johns, Alan O'Duffy – engineers
- Alan O'Duffy, Andy Johns, Jimmy Miller – mixing
- Stanley Miller, Bob Seidemann – cover design and photography
- Chris Blackwell, Robert Stigwood – executive producers
- Margaret Goldfarb – production co-ordination
- Bill Levenson – reissue supervision
- Suha Gur – remastering
- Vartan – reissue art direction

== Charts ==
=== Weekly charts ===
Weekly chart performance for Blind Faith
Chart (1969–1970)	Peak position
Australian Albums (Kent Music Report)	2
Canadian Albums (RPM) (5wks@#1)	1
Danish Albums (Hitlisten)	1
Dutch Albums (Album Top 100)	1
Finnish Albums (Suomen virallinen lista)	5
French Albums (IFOP)	4
German Albums (Offizielle Top 100)	5
Japanese Albums (Oricon)	3
Norwegian Albums (VG-lista)	1
UK Albums (OCC)	1
US Billboard 200	1

1992 weekly chart performance for Blind Faith
Chart (1992)	Peak position
Spanish Albums (AFYVE)	9

2015 weekly chart performance for Blind Faith
Chart (2015)	Peak position
Croatian International Albums (HDU)	25

=== Year-end charts ===
Year-end chart performance for Blind Faith
Chart (1969)	Position
German Albums (Offizielle Top 100)	53
Norwegian Albums (VG-lista)	20
UK Albums (OCC)	35

== Certifications ==
Certifications for Blind Faith
Region	Certification	Certified units/sales
Australia (ARIA)	3× Platinum	150,000^{^}
Canada (Music Canada)	Gold	50,000^{^}
Spain (Promusicae)	Gold	50,000^{^}
United Kingdom (BPI)	Gold	100,000^{^}
United States (RIAA)	Platinum	1,000,000^{^}
Summaries
Worldwide (IFPI)	—	8,000,000
^{^} Shipments figures based on certification alone.

== See also ==
- List of Billboard 200 number-one albums of 1969
- List of Canadian number-one albums of 1969
- List of UK Albums Chart number ones of the 1960s
- List of controversial album art
