= Remi Kabaka =

- Born: 27 March 1945; Kano, Nigeria
- Died: 8 December 2025 (aged 80); Los Angeles, California, U.S.
- Occupation: Drummer
- Years active: 1970–2025
- Spouse: Bala Malan-Kabaka (m. 1969)
- Children: Remi Kabaka Jr.
- Musical career
- Genres: Jazz
- Instruments: Drums

Remi Kabaka (27 March 1945 - 8 December 2025) was a Nigerian Afro-rock avant-garde drummer. He worked with John Martyn, Hugh Masekela, on Rhythm of the Saints by Paul Simon, and Short Cut Draw Blood by Jim Capaldi. He was also an important figure in the 1970s afro-jazz scene, composing the music to the film Black Goddess.

Remi was the father of artist and musician Remi Kabaka Jr, who is the drummer and producer of the virtual rock group Gorillaz.

== Discography ==
- 1973: Aiye-Keta (with Steve Winwood and Abdul Lasisi Amao, as Third World)
- 1980: Roots Funkadelia (Polydor)
- 1983: Great Nation (R.A.K.)
- 2024: Mystic Souls appears as a guest with The Jazz Messiahs track #4, #5, #6, #7, #8) (Soulitude Records) JM S-1205-2 url=https://www.soulituderecords.com/the-jazz-messiahs
