= Ginger Baker's Air Force 2 =

Studio album by Ginger Baker's Air Force
- Released: December 1970
- Recorded: May & October 1970 (Trident Studios, London) – September 1970 (Olympic Studios, London)
- Genre: Jazz fusion
- Length: 43:54
- Label: Atco (U.S.); Polydor (UK & Canada)
- Producer: Ginger Baker, Rick Grech, Denny Laine & Graham Bond

Ginger Baker's Air Force chronology
Ginger Baker's Air Force (1970)	Ginger Baker's Air Force 2 (1970)

Professional ratings
Review scores
Source	Rating
AllMusic	4/5 stars

Ginger Baker's Air Force 2 was the second and final album by Ginger Baker's Air Force, released in 1970. In Germany, Australia and New Zealand it was released with a different track listing, including previously unreleased songs.

This album was recorded in a studio, unlike the previous one, featuring a different lineup of the band, with Denny Laine, Harold McNair, Aliki Ashman, and Ric Grech as "Additional personnel". Graham Bond took lead vocal duties along with Ginger Baker, Diane Stewart and Catherine James.

The album cover was designed left-handed; i.e. with the front cover printed on what traditionally would be considered the back and vice versa.

== Track listing ==
UK, USA and Italian version
No.	Title	Writer(s)	Length
1.	"Let Me Ride"	Roebuck Staples	4:22
2.	"Sweet Wine"	Ginger Baker, Janet Godfrey	3:34
3.	"Do U No Hu Yor Phrenz R?"	Baker	5:40
4.	"We Free Kings"	Baker	4:22
5.	"I Don't Want to Go on Without You"	Bert Berns, Jerry Wexler	3:56
6.	"Toady"	Baker	9:45
7.	"12 Gates of the City"	Graham Bond	4:05

German, French, Spanish, Australian and New Zealand version
No.	Title	Writer(s)	Length
1.	"We Free Kings" (Alternate take)		4:57
2.	"Caribbean Soup"	Harold McNair	3:10
3.	"Sunshine of Your Love"	Jack Bruce, Pete Brown, Eric Clapton	5:49
4.	"You Wouldn't Believe It"	Denny Laine, Baker	3:42
5.	"You Look Like You Could Use a Rest"	Rick Grech	5:42
6.	"Sweet Wine"		3:34
7.	"I Don't Want to Go on Without You"		3:56
8.	"Let Me Ride"		4:23

== Personnel ==
- Ginger Baker – drums, timpani, tubular bells, African drums, vocals
- Kenny Craddock – guitars, Hammond organ, piano, vocals
- Colin Gibson – bass guitar
- Graham Bond – alto saxophone, Hammond organ, piano, vocals
- Steve Gregory – tenor saxophone, flutes
- Bud Beadle – baritone, alto & tenor saxophones
- Diane Stewart – vocals
- Catherine James – vocals
- Neemoi "Speedy" Acquaye – drums, percussion, African drums

Additional personnel

- Denny Laine – guitars, piano, vocals
- Rick Grech – bass guitar
- Harold McNair – tenor & alto saxophones, flutes
- Aliki Ashman – vocals
- Rocky Dzidzornu – percussion, conga
