= Kester Smith =

American drummer

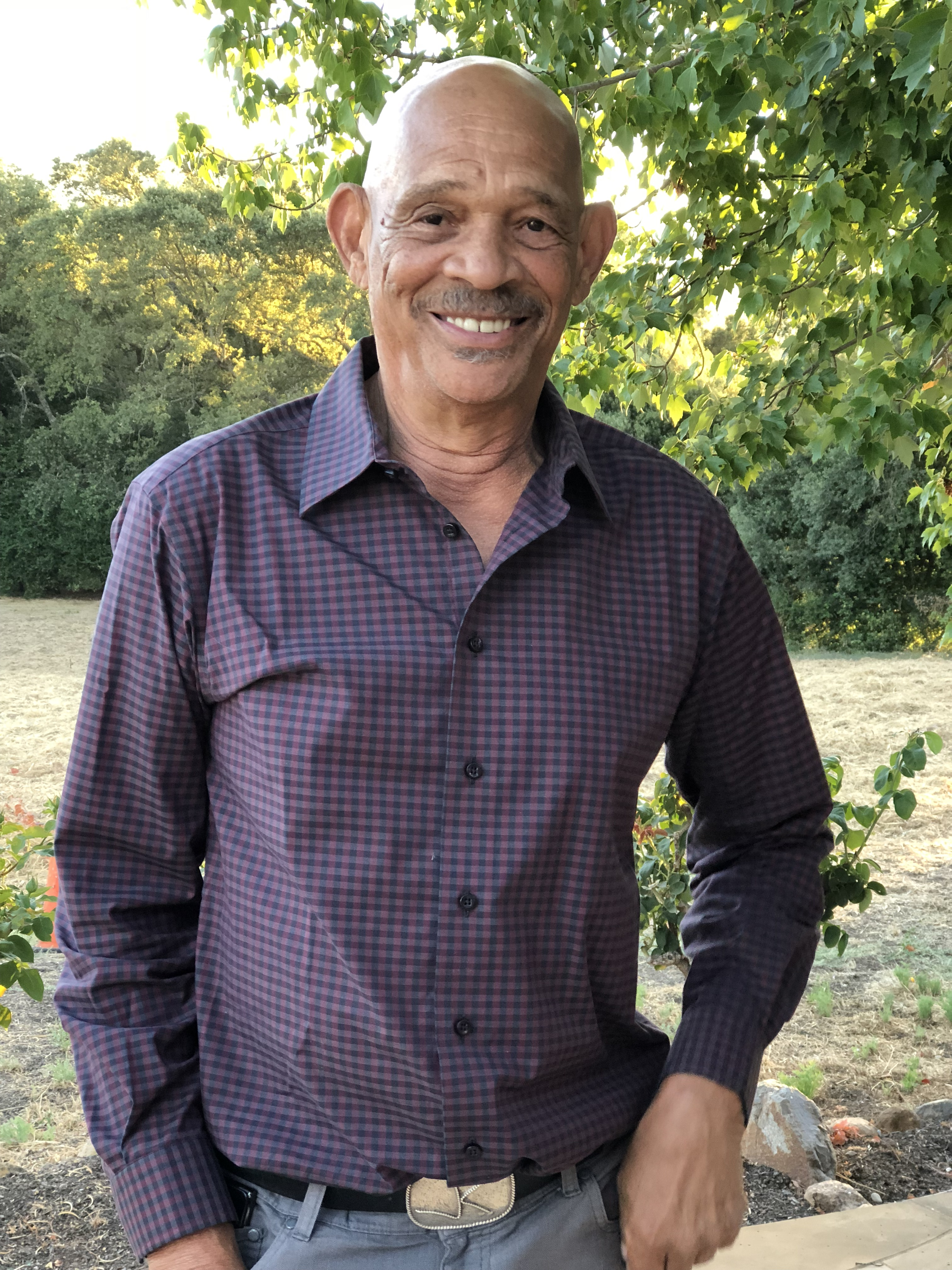
- Smith in 2018

Background information
- Born: May 14, 1941; Grenada
- Origin: Trinidad
- Died: January 15, 2024 (aged 82) Saint Helena, California
- Genres: Jazz; blues; world
- Occupation: Percussionist

Kester Winston "Smitty" Smith (May 14, 1941 – January 15, 2024) was an American percussionist. Born in Grenada and raised from a young age in Trinidad, he was the drummer for the Taj Mahal Trio and collaborated with jazz, blues and world musicians. He performed with and alongside Taj Mahal for over forty years. He recorded music with Taj Mahal, Geoff Muldaur, Peter Rowan, Cedella Booker, Morgan Freeman, Ellen McIlwaine, Mary Coughlan and Pinetop Perkins.

== Selected discography ==
- Taj Mahal, Mo' Roots, Columbia Records, 1974.
- Taj Mahalm Music Fuh Ya' (Musica Para Tu)
- Taj Mahal, Big Blues: Live at Ronnie Scott, Silverline Records, 1991
- Taj Mahal, Mule Bone, Gramavision, 1991
- Geoff Muldaur, Secret Handshake, HighTone Records, 1998
- Taj Mahal, Sugar Mama Blues, Just a Memory Records, 2004
- Taj Mahal, Maestro, Telarc, 2008
- Taj Mahal, Swingin' Live at the Church in Tulsa, Lightning Rod Records, 2024

== Death ==
Smith died surrounded by family, in his adopted hometown of St. Helena, California on January 15, 2024.
