= Ginger Baker =

English drummer (1939–2019)

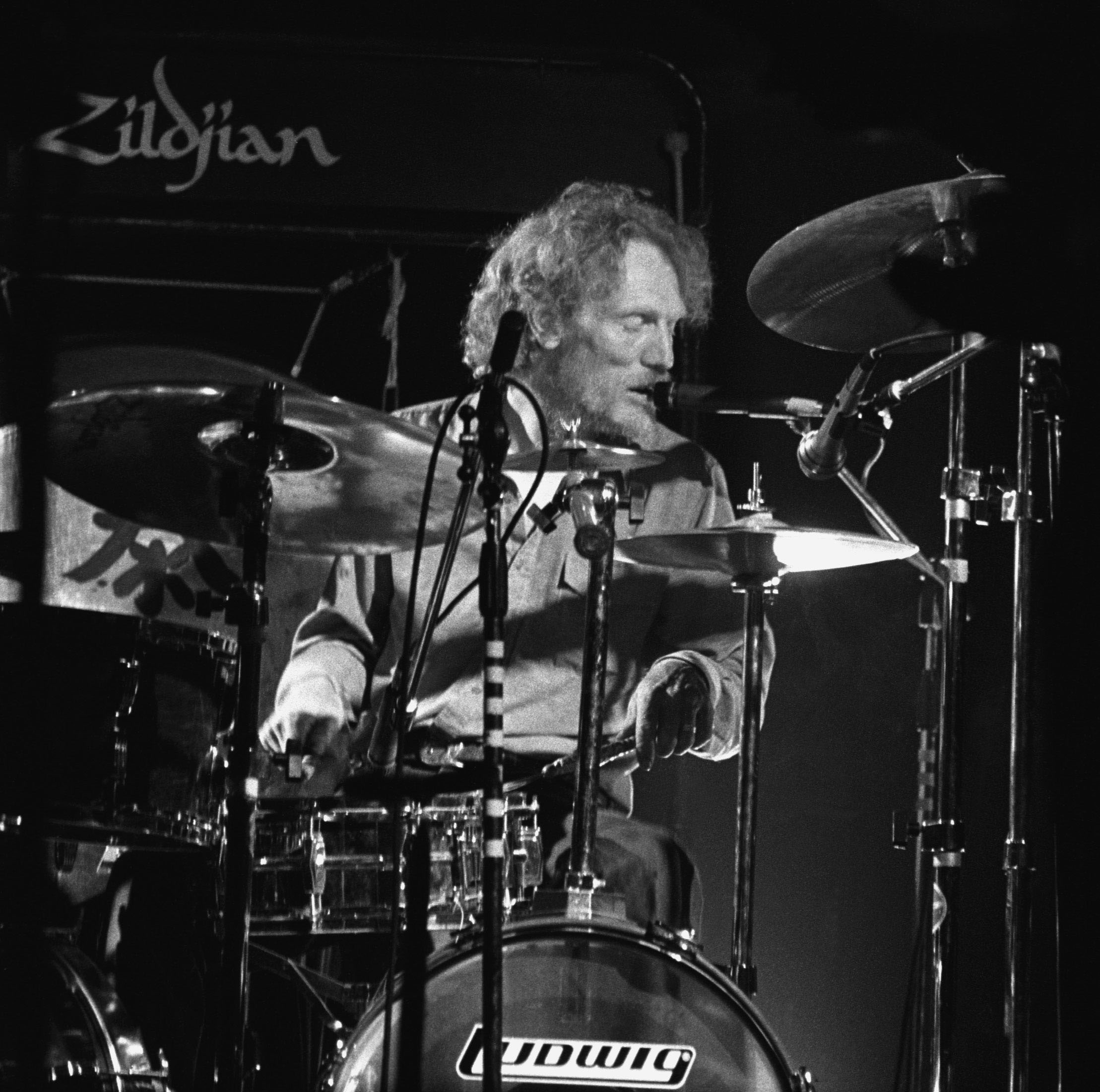
- Baker performing in 1984

Background information
- Born: Peter Edward Baker; 19 August 1939; Lewisham, South London, England
- Died: 6 October 2019 (aged 80) Canterbury, Kent, England
- Genres: Rock; blues rock; jazz rock; Afrobeat
- Occupation: Drummer
- Years active: 1950s–2015
- Labels: Polydor; Warner Bros.; Island
- Formerly of: Blues Incorporated; the Graham Bond Organisation; Cream; Ginger Baker's Air Force; Blind Faith; Ginger Baker and Friends; Baker Gurvitz Army; Hawkwind; Atomic Rooster; Masters of Reality; BBM; Ginger Baker Trio
- Website: gingerbaker.com

Peter Edward "Ginger" Baker (19 August 1939 – 6 October 2019) was an English drummer. His work in the 1960s and 1970s earned him the reputation of "rock's first superstar drummer", for a style that melded jazz and African rhythms and pioneered both jazz fusion and world music.

Baker gained early fame as a member of Blues Incorporated and the Graham Bond Organisation, both times alongside bassist Jack Bruce, with whom Baker would often clash. In 1966, Baker and Bruce joined guitarist Eric Clapton to form Cream, which achieved worldwide success but lasted only until 1968, in part due to Baker's and Bruce's volatile relationship. Following Cream, Baker worked again with Clapton in the short-lived band Blind Faith and formed Ginger Baker's Air Force. In the 1970s, Baker spent several years living and recording in Africa, often with Fela Kuti, in pursuit of his long-time interest in African music. He created the Baker Gurvitz Army with brothers Paul and Adrian Gurvitz in 1974. Among Baker's other collaborations are his work with Billy Preston, George Harrison, Paul McCartney, Hawkwind, Atomic Rooster, Public Image Ltd, Gary Moore, and Andy Summers.

Baker's drumming is regarded for its style, showmanship, and use of two bass drums instead of the conventional single one, after the manner of the jazz drummer Louie Bellson. In his early days, he performed lengthy drum solos, most notably in the Cream song "Toad", one of the earliest recorded examples in rock music. Baker was an inductee of the Rock and Roll Hall of Fame as a member of Cream in 1993 and of the Modern Drummer Hall of Fame in 2008. He was ranked 3rd on Rolling Stone's "100 Greatest Drummers of All Time" in 2016. Baker was noted for his eccentric, often self-destructive lifestyle, and he struggled with heroin addiction for many decades. He was married four times and fathered three children.

== Early life ==
Peter Edward Baker was born on 19 August 1939 in Lewisham, South London; he was nicknamed "Ginger" for his shock of flaming red hair. His mother, Ruby May (née Bayldon), worked in a tobacco shop. His father, Frederick Louvain Formidable Baker, was a bricklayer employed by his own father, who owned a building business. Frederick Baker also served as a lance corporal in the Royal Corps of Signals in World War II; he died in the 1943 Dodecanese campaign. Baker went to Pope Street School, where he was considered "one of the better players" in the football team, and then to Shooter's Hill Grammar School. While at school he joined Squadron 56 of the Air Training Corps, based at Woolwich and stayed with them for two or three years.

== Career ==
Baker began playing drums at around 15 years of age. In the early 1960s he took lessons from Phil Seamen, one of the leading British jazz drummers of the post-war era.

=== Early bands ===
In the 1960s he joined Blues Incorporated, the residential house band at Ealing Jazz Club, where he met bassist Jack Bruce. The two clashed often, but would be rhythm section partners again in the Graham Bond Organisation, a rhythm and blues group with strong jazz leanings. Their relationship was so volatile that Baker once attacked Bruce with a knife during a concert.

In March 1963, Baker played in the Johnny Burch Octet with Burch, Jack Bruce, Mike Falana, Stan Robinson, John Mumford and others.

=== Cream ===
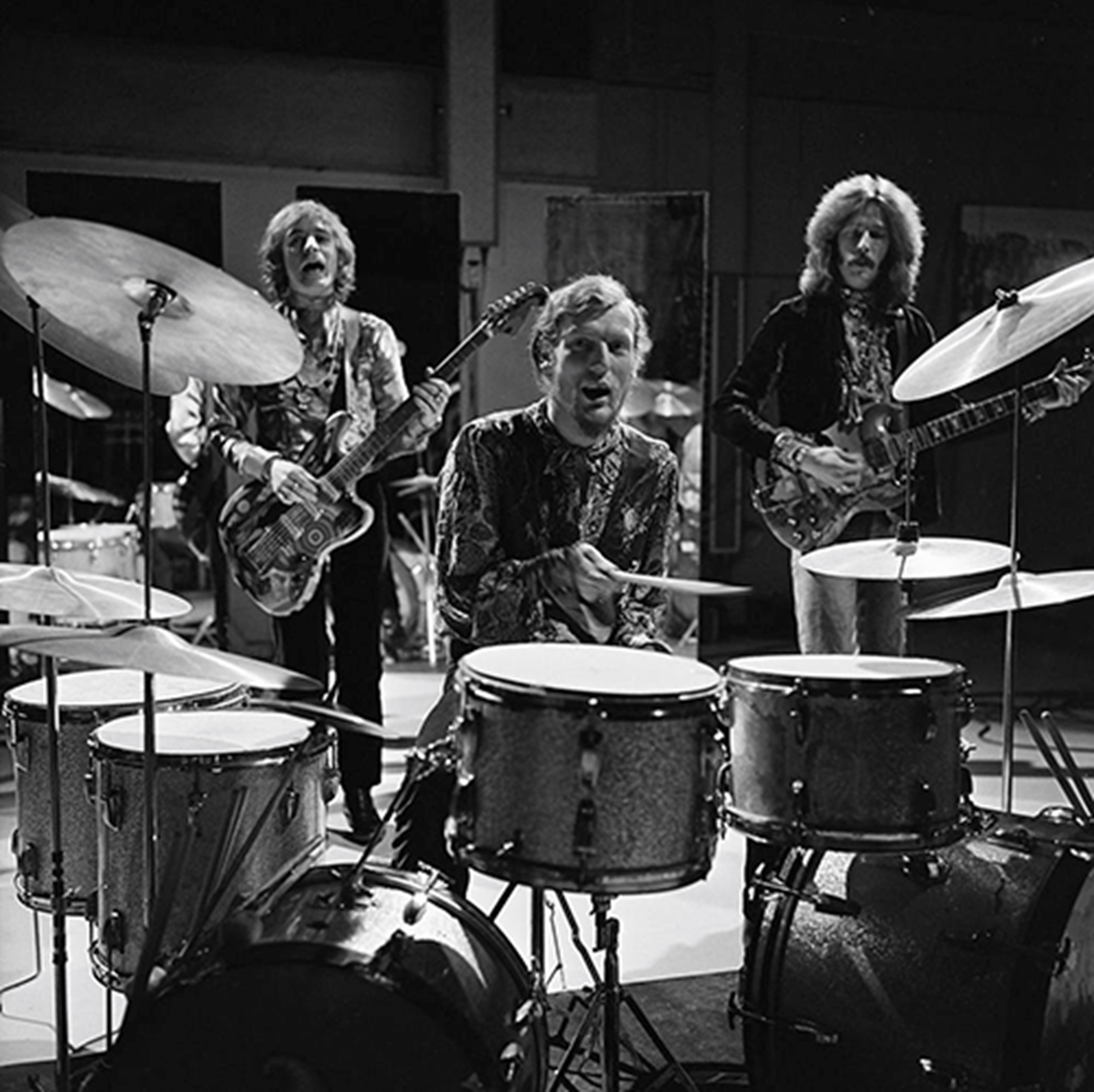
Cream performing on Dutch television in January 1968

Despite this volatile relationship, Baker and Bruce reunited in 1966 when they formed Cream with guitarist Eric Clapton. A fusion of blues, psychedelic rock and hard rock, the band released four albums in a little over two years before breaking up in 1968.

=== Blind Faith ===
Baker then joined the short-lived "supergroup" Blind Faith, comprising Eric Clapton, bassist Ric Grech from Family, and Steve Winwood from Traffic on keyboards and vocals. They released only one album, Blind Faith, before breaking up.

=== Ginger Baker's Air Force ===
In 1970 Baker formed, toured and recorded two albums with fusion rock group Ginger Baker's Air Force.

=== 1970s ===
Following Air Force, Baker created the short-lived "Ginger Baker Drum Choir", which released a sole single on Atco Records (and Polydor in Germany) in 1971. The 45 RPM record featured a three-piece drum ensemble and "call and response" vocals, with the song "Atunde! (We are here)" and "Atunde! (part 2)" on its A and B sides.

In November 1971, Baker decided to set up a recording studio in Lagos, then the capital of Nigeria. He decided that it would be an interesting experience to travel to Nigeria overland across the Sahara. Baker invited documentary filmmaker Tony Palmer to join him and the film Ginger Baker in Africa follows his odyssey as he makes his journey and finally arrives in Nigeria to set up his studio. After many frustrating setbacks and technical hitches, Batakota (ARC) studios opened at the end of January 1973, and operated successfully through the seventies as a facility for both local and western musicians. Paul McCartney and Wings recorded the song "Picasso's Last Words (Drink to Me)" for Band on the Run at the studio, with Baker playing a tin can full of gravel.

Baker sat in with Fela Kuti during recording sessions in 1971 released by Regal Zonophone as Live! Fela also appeared with Baker on Stratavarious (1972) alongside Bobby Gass, a pseudonym for Bobby Tench from the Jeff Beck Group. Stratavarious was later re-issued as part of the compilation Do What You Like (1998). Baker formed Baker Gurvitz Army with brothers Paul and Adrian Gurvitz in 1974 (encouraged by manager Bill Fehilly). The band recorded three albums, Baker Gurvitz Army (1974), Elysian Encounter (1975) and Hearts on Fire (1976), and the band toured through England and Europe in 1975. The band broke up in 1976, not long after the death of Fehilly in a plane crash.

=== 1980s ===
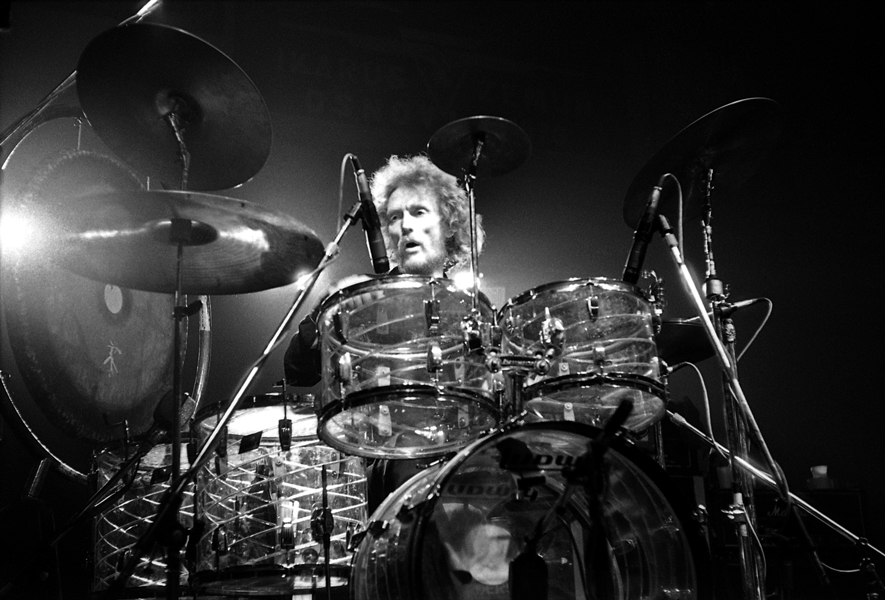
Baker in 1980

After the failure of the recording studio in Lagos, Baker spent most of the early 1980s on an olive farm in a small town in Tuscany, Italy. During this period, he played little music.

In 1980, Baker joined Hawkwind after initially playing as a session musician on the album Levitation. He left in 1981, after a tour. Live material and studio demos from that period which Baker participated in were included on two Hawkwind albums, released later in the 1980s. In 1985, he worked with producer Bill Laswell on Horses & Trees and then performed as a session musician on Album by Public Image Ltd.

Baker moved to Los Angeles in the late 1980s intending to become an actor. He unsuccessfully auditioned for the part of the Homeless Man in the 1989 "Weird Al" Yankovic comedy film UHF and appeared in the 1990 TV series Nasty Boys as Ginger.

=== 1990s ===
In 1992 Baker played with the hard rock group Masters of Reality with bassist Googe and singer/guitarist Chris Goss on the album Sunrise on the Sufferbus.

BBM (Bruce Baker Moore) formed in 1993. The short-lived power trio with the line-up of Baker, Jack Bruce and Irish blues rock guitarist Gary Moore recorded the album Around the Next Dream, released 1994.

Baker lived in Parker, Colorado between 1993 and 1999, in part due to his passion for polo. Baker not only participated in polo events at the Salisbury Equestrian Park, but he also sponsored an ongoing series of jam sessions and concerts at the equestrian centre on weekends. His past drug history increasingly caused him problems with U.S. immigration, so in 1999 he sold his property in Parker and moved to South Africa. In 1994, he formed the Ginger Baker Trio with bassist Charlie Haden and guitarist Bill Frisell.

=== 2000s and 2010s ===
On 3 May 2005, Baker reunited with Eric Clapton and Jack Bruce for a series of Cream concerts at the Royal Albert Hall and Madison Square Garden. The London concerts were recorded and released as Royal Albert Hall London May 2-3-5-6, 2005 (2005). In a Rolling Stone article written in 2009, Bruce is quoted as saying, "It's a knife-edge thing between me and Ginger. Nowadays, we're happily co-existing in different continents [Bruce, who died in 2014, lived in Britain, while Baker lived in South Africa] ... although I was thinking of asking him to move. He's still a bit too close".

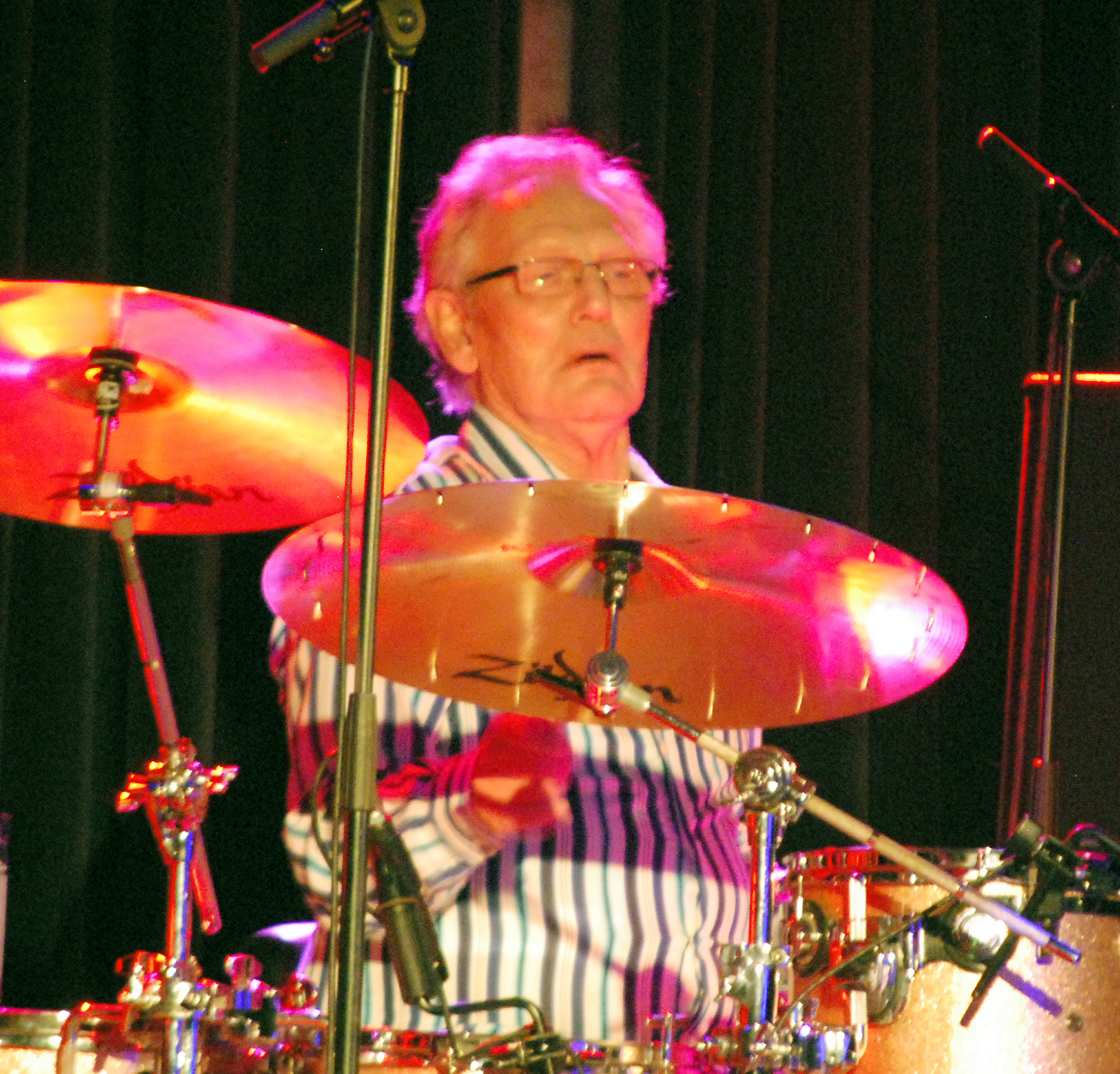
Baker in 2011

In 2008 a bank clerk, Lindiwe Noko, was charged with defrauding Baker of almost R 500,000 (equivalent to about US$60,500 at the time and US$90,500 currently). Baker said he had hired Noko as a personal assistant, paying her £7 per day (about R 100) for performing errands, and alleged she used this position to uncover his private banking information and make unauthorised withdrawals.

Noko claimed that the money was a gift after she and Baker became lovers. Baker replied, "I've a scar that only a woman who had a thing with me would know. It's there and she doesn't know it's there." Noko pleaded not guilty but was convicted of fraud. In October 2010, she was sentenced to three years of "correctional supervision", a type of community service. Baker called the sentence "a travesty".

His autobiography Hellraiser was published in 2009. In 2013 and 2014, he toured with the Ginger Baker Jazz Confusion, a quartet comprising Baker, saxophonist Alfred "Pee Wee" Ellis, bassist Alec Dankworth, and percussionist Abass Dodoo. In 2014, Baker signed with Motéma Music to release the album Why?.

== Documentaries ==
Ginger Baker in Africa (1971) documents Baker's drive by Range Rover, from Algeria to Nigeria, across the Sahara. At his destination, Lagos, he sets up a recording studio and jams with Fela Kuti.

In 2012, the Jay Bulger documentary film Beware of Mr. Baker about Baker's life had its world premiere at South by Southwest in Austin, Texas, where it won the Grand Jury Award for best documentary feature. It received its UK premiere on BBC One on 7 July 2015.

== Style and technique ==
Baker cited Phil Seamen, Art Blakey, Max Roach, Elvin Jones, Philly Joe Jones and Baby Dodds as main influences on his style. Although he was generally considered a pupil of Seamen, Baker stated that he was largely self-taught and he only played some exercises with Seamen.

Baker's early performance attracted attention for both his musicality and showmanship. While he became famous during his time with Cream for his wild, unpredictable, and flamboyant performances that were often viewed in a vein similar to that of Keith Moon from the Who, Baker also frequently employed a much more restrained and straightforward performance style influenced by the British jazz groups he heard during the late 1950s and early 1960s. Although he is usually categorised as having been a "rock drummer", Baker himself preferred to be viewed as a jazz drummer, or as just "a drummer".

Along with Moon, Baker was credited as one of the early pioneers of double bass drumming in rock. He recollected that in 1966 he began to adopt two bass drums in his setup after he and Moon watched drummer Sam Woodyard at a Duke Ellington concert. According to Baker:

Every drummer that ever played for Duke Ellington played a double bass drum kit. I went to a Duke Ellington concert in 1966 and Sam Woodyard was playing with Duke and he played some incredible tom-tom and two bass drum things, some of which I still use today and I just knew I had to get a two bass drum kit. Keith Moon was with me at that concert and we were discussing it and he went straight round to Premier and bought two kits which he stuck together. I had to wait for Ludwig to make a kit up for me, which they did—to my own specifications. So Moonie had the two bass drum kit some months before I did.

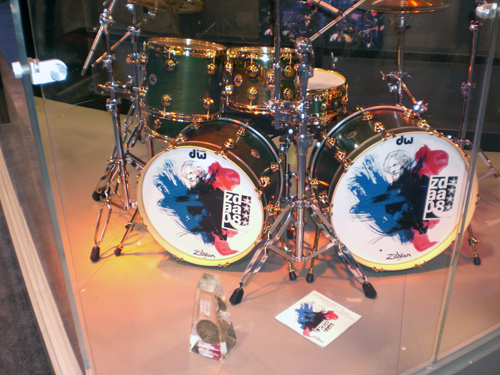
Baker's DW drumset (2009)

Baker preferred light, thin, fast-rebounding drum sticks (size 7A), usually held using a matched grip. Baker's playing made use of syncopation and ride cymbal patterns characteristic of bebop and other advanced forms of jazz, as well as the frequent application of African rhythms.

In his early days, he developed what would later become the archetypal rock drum solo, with the best known example being the five-minute-long instrumental "Toad" from Cream's debut album Fresh Cream (1966). Baker was one of the first drummers to move his left foot between his left bass drum pedal and hi-hat pedal to create various combinations. Somewhat atypically, Baker mounted all of the tom-toms on his drum kit in a vertical fashion, with the shells of the drums perpendicular to the floor, as opposed to the more common practice of angling the rack toms toward the player.

Baker's most recent kit was made by Drum Workshop. He used Ludwig Drums until the late 1990s. All of his cymbals were made by Zildjian; the 22-inch rivet ride cymbal and the 14-inch hi-hats he used were the same ones he used during the last two Cream tours in 1968.

== Legacy ==
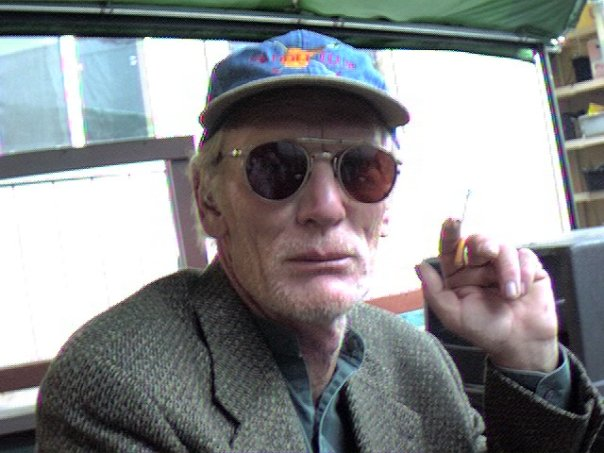
Ginger Baker in 1997

Baker's style influenced many drummers, including John Bonham, Peter Criss, Neil Peart, Stewart Copeland, Ian Paice, Terry Bozzio, Dave Lombardo, Tommy Aldridge, Bill Bruford, Alex Van Halen, Danny Seraphine and Nick Mason.

Modern Drummer magazine described him as "one of classic rock's first influential drumming superstars of the 1960s" and "one of classic rock's true drum gods". AllMusic described him as "the most influential percussionist of the 1960s" and stated that "virtually every drummer of every heavy metal band that has followed since that time has sought to emulate some aspect of Baker's playing". Although he is widely considered a pioneer of heavy metal drumming, Baker expressed his repugnance for the genre.

Drum! magazine listed Baker among the "50 Most Important Drummers of All Time" and has defined him as "one of the most imitated '60s drummers", stating also that "he forever changed the face of rock music". He was voted the third greatest drummer of all time in a Rolling Stone reader poll and has been considered the "drummer who practically invented the rock drum solo". In 2016, he was ranked 3rd on Rolling Stone's "100 Greatest Drummers of All Time".

According to author and columnist Ken Micallef in his book Classic Rock Drummers: "the pantheon of contemporary drummers from metal, fusion, and rock owe their very existence to Baker's trailblazing work with Cream". Neil Peart has said: "His playing was revolutionary – extrovert, primal and inventive. He set the bar for what rock drumming could be. [...] Every rock drummer since has been influenced in some way by Ginger – even if they don't know it".

== Personal life ==
Baker was infamous for his irascible personality and violent temper, as well as for confrontations with musicians and fans. Rolling Stone reporter David Fricke wrote in 2012 that even in old age, "you get close to Baker at your peril."

Baker was married four times and fathered three children. Baker and his first wife, Liz Finch, had their first child, Ginette Karen, on 20 December 1960. Baker's second daughter, Leda, was born 20 February 1968. Baker's son, Kofi Streatfield Baker, was born in March 1969 and named after Baker's friend, Ghanaian drummer Kofi Ghanaba. Kofi is also a drummer, notably playing with Uli Jon Roth and Glenn Hughes.

=== Illness and death ===
Baker struggled with heroin addiction throughout his life, having begun using the drug in the 1960s while a jazz drummer in London clubs. Each time he travelled to Africa, he would get sober temporarily only to relapse. He estimated that he stopped using the drug around 29 times during his life, but was only able to quit permanently after moving to a small Italian village in 1981 where he took up olive farming.

In February 2013, Baker said he had chronic obstructive pulmonary disease from years of heavy smoking, and chronic back pain from degenerative osteoarthritis. In February 2016, Baker was diagnosed with "serious heart issues" and cancelled all future gigs. Writing on his blog, he said, "Just seen doctor ... big shock ... no more gigs for this old drummer ... everything is off ... of all things I never thought it would be my heart ..."

In late March 2016, it was revealed that Baker was set for pioneering treatment. "There are two options for surgery and, depending on how strong my old lungs are, they may do both." He added, "Cardiologist is brilliant. Yesterday he inserted a tube into the artery at my right wrist and fed it all the way to my heart—quite an experience. He was taking pictures of my heart from inside—amazing technology ... He says he's going to get me playing again! Thanks all for your support". In June 2016, it was reported he was recovering from open heart surgery, but had also suffered a bad fall, which had caused swollen legs and feet.

On 25 September 2019, Baker's family reported that he was critically ill, and asked fans to keep him in their prayers. Baker died on 6 October 2019 at the age of 80, at a hospital in Canterbury from complications of COPD. On 23 October 2019, a private funeral service was held in Canterbury, Kent, with close family and friends.

== Discography ==
Solo

- Ginger Baker at His Best (1972)
- Stratavarious (Polydor, 1972)
- Eleven Sides of Baker (Mountain/Sire, 1976/1977)
- From Humble Oranges (CDG, 1983)
- Horses & Trees (Celluloid, 1986)
- No Material (ITM, 1989)
- Middle Passage (Axiom, 1990)
- Unseen Rain (Day Eight, 1992)
- Ginger Baker's Energy (ITM, 1992)
- Going Back Home (Atlantic, 1994)
- Ginger Baker The Album (ITM, 1995)
- Falling Off the Roof (Atlantic, 1996)
- Do What You Like (Polydor, 1998)
- Coward of the County (Atlantic, 1999)
- African Force (2001)
- African Force: Palanquin's Pole (2006)
- Why? (2014)

The Storyville Jazz Men and the Hugh Rainey Allstars

- Storyville Re-Visited (1958) also featuring Bob Wallis and Ginger Baker

Alexis Korner Blues Incorporated

- Alexis Korner and Friends (1963)

Graham Bond Organisation

- Live at Klooks Kleek (1964)
- The Sound of '65 (1965)
- There's a Bond Between Us (1965)

Cream discography

- Fresh Cream (Polydor, 1966)
- Disraeli Gears (Polydor, 1967)
- Wheels of Fire (Polydor, 1968)
- Goodbye (Polydor, 1969)
- Live Cream (Polydor, 1970)
- Live Cream Volume II (Polydor, 1972)
- BBC Sessions (2003)
- Royal Albert Hall London May 2-3-5-6, 2005 (Reprise, 2005)

Blind Faith discography

- Blind Faith (Polydor, 1969)

Ginger Baker's Air Force

- Ginger Baker's Air Force (Atco, 1970)
- Ginger Baker's Air Force II (Atco, 1970)

Baker Gurvitz Army

- Baker Gurvitz Army (Janus, 1974)
- Elysian Encounter (Atco, 1975)
- Hearts on Fire (Atco, 1976)
- Flying in and Out of Stardom (Castle, 2003)
- Greatest Hits (GB Music, 2003)
- Live in Derby (Major League Productions, 2005)
- Live (Revisited, 2005)

with Fela Kuti

- Fela's London Scene (EMI, 1971) – uncredited
- Why Black Man Dey Suffer (African Sounds, 1971)
- Live! (Regal Zonophone, 1972)

with Hawkwind

- Levitation (Bronze, 1980)
- Zones (Flicknife, 1983)
- This Is Hawkwind, Do Not Panic (Flicknife, 1984)

with others

- That's the Way God Planned It by Billy Preston (Apple, 1969)
- All Things Must Pass by George Harrison (Apple, 1970)
- Band on the Run by Paul McCartney and Wings (Apple, 1973)
- Album by Public Image Ltd (Elektra/Virgin, 1986)
- Unseen Rain with Jens Johansson and Jonas Hellborg (Day Eight, 1992)
- Sunrise on the Sufferbus by Masters of Reality (Chrysalis, 1992)
- Cities of the Heart by Jack Bruce (CMP, 1993)
- Around the Next Dream by BBM (Capitol, 1994)
- Synaesthesia by Andy Summers (CMP, 1996)
- Coward of the County by Ginger Baker and the Denver Jazz Quintet-to-Octet (DJQ2O) (Atlantic, 1999)

== General references ==
- Baker, Ginger; Baker, Ginette (7 June 2010). Ginger Baker, Hellraiser: The Autobiography of the World's Greatest Drummer. London: John Blake. ISBN 9781844549665. OCLC 847740966.
