= Native American-Serving Non-Tribal Institution =

Native American-Serving Non-Tribal Institutions (NASNTIs), also called Native American-Serving Institutions (NASIs) are colleges and universities in the United States, other than tribal colleges and universities, that serve an undergraduate population with at least 50% receiving Title IV needs-based assistance and in which Native American students constitute at least 10%. Qualifying institutions can apply for and receive grants from the Department of Education for programs related to serving Native American and low income students.

In the academic enrollment year 2012-13, there were 13,820 American Indian/Alaska Native students enrolled in Native American-Serving Non-Tribal Institutions.

== History ==
Native American-Serving Non-Tribal Institutions were first federally recognized by the Higher Education Opportunity Act of 2008, which also established funding for Predominantly Black Institutions (PBIs) and Asian American and Native American Pacific Islander-Serving Institutions (AANAPISIs).

== List of institutions ==
The following 26 institutions are Native American-Serving Non-Tribal Institutions eligible for federal funding for FY 2025.

- Alaska Pacific University
- Bladen Community College
- Carl Albert State College
- Central Wyoming College
- Clary Sage College
- Coconino Community College
- Community Care College
- Connors State College
- East Central University
- Eastern New Mexico University Ruidoso Branch Community College
- Eastern Oklahoma State College
- Fort Lewis College
- Heritage University
- Montana State University-Northern
- New Mexico State University-Grants
- Northeastern Oklahoma A&M College
- Northeastern State University
- Northern Oklahoma College
- Northland Pioneer College
- Oklahoma State University Institute of Technology
- Oklahoma Technical College
- Redlands Community College
- Richmond Community College
- Robeson Community College
- Rogers State University
- San Juan College
- Seminole State College (Oklahoma)
- Southeastern Oklahoma State University
- University of Alaska Fairbanks
- University of Alaska Southeast
- University of Minnesota-Morris
- University of New Mexico-Gallup Campus
- University of North Carolina at Pembroke
- University of Science and Arts of Oklahoma

== See also ==
- Minority-serving institution
- Indigenous education
- Contemporary Native American issues in the United States: Education
