= Swingin' Live at the Church in Tulsa =

Studio album by Taj Mahal
- Released: March 8, 2024
- Recorded: 2023
- Studio: The Church Studio, Tulsa, Oklahoma, US
- Genre: Blues
- Length: 58:04
- Language: English
- Label: Lightning Rod Records

Taj Mahal chronology
Savoy (2023)	Swingin' Live at the Church in Tulsa (2024)

It was the water I swam in. From this perspective, I could see I was really surrounded. I was deep in the water of the music. When I started, it was really important to play for myself. Then I had some opportunities to join different bands. I knew a lot of music to play. Those guys didn't know the origins of the music. I would bring them songs I would think they knew, and I had to teach them the songs. We ended up having bands that sounded so different. They were oriented toward: "It's on the radio, therefore it is." I was like, "It's in the universe, therefore it is." I realized if it wasn't somebody else's music, I didn't really know the music or the tradition or any of the people who were in it. That's when I started buckling down and paying attention.

—Taj Mahal on his attraction to American roots music and its influence on this recording.

Swingin' Live at the Church in Tulsa is a 2024 album by American blues musician Taj Mahal, recorded live before an audience in The Church Studio. It has received positive reviews from critics.

Swingin' Live at the Church in Tulsa won the 2025 Grammy Award for Best Traditional Blues Album.

== Reception ==
Writing for American Songwriter, Grant Britt stated that this album "mesmerizes" and the vocals are "like hearing the voice of God". In The Arts Fuse, Scott McLennan called this release "a snapshot of a vibrant octogenarian artist who is still moving forward" that will please blues purists with Mahal's musicianship. Swingin' Live at the Church in Tulsa was an editor's pick in Spill Magazine, where Ljubinko Zivkovic rated it 9 out of 10, praising the sextet of musicians and continuing that the music is "the good old blues in its purest (electric) form and that mastery that has not left him so far shines, both in his, the band's playing and Taj Mahal's always incredible vocal delivery".

== Track listing ==
1. "Betty and Dupree" (Chuck Willis) – 7:42
2. "Mailbox Blues" (Taj Mahal) – 4:06
3. "Queen Bee" (Mahal) – 6:03
4. "Lovin' in My Baby's Eyes" (Mahal) – 3:56
5. "Waiting for My Papa to Come Home" (Mahal) – 3:50
6. "Slow Drag" (Mahal) – 5:44
7. "Sitting On Top of the World" (Chester Burnett) – 5:48
8. "Twilight in Hawaii" (David Keliʻi) – 5:58
9. "Corrina" (Jesse Edwin Davis III and Mahal) – 5:11
10. "Mean Old World" (Aaron Walker and Marl Young) – 9:48

== Personnel ==
=== The Taj Mahal Sextet ===
- Taj Mahal – guitar, banjo, ukulele, piano, vocals
- Trey Hensley – acoustic guitar, vocals
- Rob Ickes – dobro guitar
- Bobby Ingano – Hawaiian lap steel guitar, Fender Stratocaster
- Bill Rich – bass guitar
- Kester Smith – drums

=== Technical ===
- Taj Mahal – producer
- Teresa Knox – executive producer
- Cade Roberts – sound engineer
- John DiBiase - mixing engineer
- Todd Divel – assistant engineer
- Dan Heinrichs – front-of-house engineer
- Phil Clarkin – photographer
- Matthew Simonson – videographer
- Nicholas Townsend - Mastering Engineer

== See also ==
- 2024 in American music
- List of 2024 albums
