= Asian American and Native American Pacific Islander-Serving Institution =

Federal designation for minority-serving colleges and universities in the U.S.

Asian American and Native American Pacific Islander–Serving Institutions
- Abbreviation: AANAPISI
- Formation: 2007
- Headquarters: Washington, D.C.
- Region served: United States
- Parent organization: United States Department of Education
- Website: www2.ed.gov/programs/aanapi/index.html

The Asian American and Native American Pacific Islander–Serving Institutions (AANAPISIs) are colleges and universities in the United States recognized by the federal government for enrolling significant numbers of Asian American and Pacific Islander (AAPI) students. The designation was created by Congress in 2007 under the Higher Education Act of 1965, as amended, and is administered by the United States Department of Education. AANAPISIs are part of the broader group of minority-serving institutions (MSIs).

== History ==
The AANAPISI designation was established through the College Cost Reduction and Access Act of 2007, which amended the Higher Education Act.

The creation of AANAPISIs followed years of advocacy by Asian American and Pacific Islander education coalitions, who argued that despite the "model minority" stereotype, AAPI students faced unique barriers in higher education, particularly in low-income and immigrant communities. The program was intended to provide resources comparable to those available to HBCUs and Hispanic-serving institutions.

== Eligibility ==
To qualify as an AANAPISI, an institution must:

- Have at least 10 percent of undergraduate students identifying as Asian American or Native American Pacific Islander.
- Be eligible as a minority-serving institution, which includes enrolling large proportions of students with financial need (as measured by Pell Grant eligibility).
- Demonstrate that additional federal funding would strengthen academic quality, student services, institutional management, and fiscal stability.

== Federal program ==
The United States Department of Education administers the Asian American and Native American Pacific Islander–Serving Institutions Program (AANAPISI Program), which provides competitive discretionary grants to eligible colleges and universities.

Grants may be used for:

- Academic program development and faculty support.
- Student support services, including tutoring, mentoring, and advising.
- Curriculum development in areas of high demand.
- Strengthening financial aid, technology, and library resources.

== Institutions ==
AANAPISI-designated institutions are concentrated in regions with significant AAPI populations, particularly in California, Hawaiʻi, New York and New Jersey. As of 2025, examples include:

- California State University, East Bay
- University of Hawaiʻi at Mānoa
- San Francisco State University
- Queens College, City University of New York
- De Anza College
- New Jersey Institute of Technology

== AANAPISI Week ==
This is an annual week of recognition that honors the impact and achievements of AANAPISIs and provides a platform for organizations, institutions, and communities to uplift and support historically underserved AANHPI students. AANAPISI Week takes place in the last week of September and is a federal designation created by Congress on September 27, 2007.

== See also ==
- Historically Black colleges and universities
- Hispanic-serving institution
- Tribal colleges and universities
- Minority-serving institution
- Asian Pacific Islander American Association of Colleges and Universities
