= Minority-serving institution =

Type of higher education institutiom in the United States

A minority-serving institution (MSI) is an institution of higher education in the United States that enroll a significant percentage of students from minority groups.

== Definition ==
The term MSI is defined in US federal statute under the Higher Education Act (HEA), and several federal agencies maintain a listing of eligible institutions that receive HEA funding designated for MSIs, such as the U.S. Department of Education and the National Science Foundation. Most MSIs qualify for federal funding based on annual undergraduate or graduate enrollment and graduation criteria (enrollment-driven MSIs, such as Hispanic-Serving Institutions (HSIs), Predominantly Black Institutions (PBIs), Native American-Serving Non-Tribal Institutions (NASNTIs), Alaska Native and Native Hawaiian-Serving Institutions (ANNHIs), and Asian American and Native American Pacific Islander-Serving Institutions (AANAPISIs)), while two types are statutorily defined: Historically Black Colleges and Universities (HBCUs) and Tribal Colleges and Universities (TCUs). For example, a report from the U.S. Department of Education on the characteristics of MSIs defined MSI based on either of two separate criteria: legislation (e.g. HBCU, TCU), or percentage of minority undergraduate enrollment based on IPEDS data (i.e. "institutions that enroll at least 25 percent of a specific minority group are designated as 'minority-serving' for that group").

== Disambiguation ==
The similar term “minority institutions” (MIs) is defined by § 365(3) of the Higher Education Act (HEA) of 1965 (20 U.S.C. § 1067k(3)).

== Background ==
Many MSIs, such as Historically black colleges and universities (HBCUs) and Tribal Colleges and Universities (TCUs), began in response to a history of inequality and a lack of access for people of color to majority institutions. MSIs overall now occupy a unique place in the nation, serving primarily, but not exclusively, low-income students, first generation students, and students of color. These institutions have highly diverse faculties and staffs, enhance student learning and promote leadership skills, and provide programs of study address deficiencies that originated at the primary and secondary level. MSIs play an important role in the nation’s economy by preparing a diverse workforce and prepare underrepresented students for graduate and professional school.

Until 2007, no federal legislation existed concerning institutions serving Asian American and Pacific Islanders. The College Cost Reduction and Access Act of 2007 made history, because it granted federal recognition to these institutions, making them eligible to be designated as minority serving institutions.

MSIs serve a large number of financially-challenged students: 98 percent of African Americans and Native Americans who enroll at HBCUs or TCUs receive or qualify for federal financial aid, and over 50% of all students enrolled at MSIs receive Pell Grant support. As a point of comparison, only 31 percent of all college students receive Pell Grant support. Moreover, nearly half of MSI students are first generation college students. In comparison, only 35 percent of students attending Predominantly White Institutions.

== Federal funding ==
MSIs are eligible for federal and private funding based on specific eligibility requirements, as determined by the funding agency.

Federal funding is provided directly to some MSIs under Title III of the Higher Education Act of 1965:

1. Historically Black Colleges and Universities (HBCU) – institutions founded prior to the enactment of the Civil Rights Act of 1964 that were created primarily to educate African Americans (e.g., Alabama State University, Morgan State University, and Texas Southern University)
2. Predominantly Black Institutions (PBI) – institutions that do not meet the legal definition of HBCUs, but primarily serve African Americans. Eligibility is based on serving an undergraduate population that is both low-income (at least 50% receiving Title IV needs-based assistance) and in which African American students constitute at least 40% (e.g., Georgia State University, Trinity Washington University, Community College of Philadelphia).
3. Hispanic-Serving Institutions (HSI) – institutions that serve an undergraduate population that is both low income (at least 50% receiving Title IV needs-based assistance) and in which Hispanic students constitute at least 25% (e.g., University of Texas at El Paso, Fresno Pacific University, and University of Texas Rio Grande Valley).
4. Tribal Colleges or Universities (TCU) – institutions of higher education which are formally controlled, or have been formally sanctioned, or chartered, by the governing body of a Native American tribe (e.g., Diné College).
5. Native American-Serving Non-Tribal Institutions (NANTI) – institutions other than TCUs that serve an undergraduate population that is both low-income (at least 50% receiving Title IV needs-based assistance) and in which American Indian students constitute at least 10% (e.g., Southeastern Oklahoma State University).
6. Alaskan Native or Native Hawaiian-Serving Institutions (ANNH or ANNHSI) – institutions that serve an undergraduate population that is both low income (at least 50% receiving Title IV needs-based assistance) and in which Alaska Native students constitute at least 20% or Hawaiian Native students constitute at least 10% (e.g., University of Alaska Fairbanks and University of Hawaii at Manoa).
7. Asian American and Native American Pacific Islander-Serving Institutions (AANAPISI) – institutions that serve an undergraduate population that is both low-income (at least 50% receiving Title IV needs-based assistance) and in which Asian American or Native American Pacific Islander students constitute at least 10% (e.g., California State University, Los Angeles, NJIT and University of Guam).

Strengthening Institutions Program (SIP) institutions serve a low-income undergraduate population (at least 50% receiving Title IV needs-based assistance) and are eligible for federal funding under Title III of the Higher Education Act of 1965. However, as there are no requirements for minority enrollment under Title III Part A, in some cases these institutions may or may not be considered MSIs.

== Executive Orders ==
Specific Executive Orders currently referencing MSIs include:

- E.O. 13779; White House Initiative To Promote Excellence and Innovation at Historically Black Colleges and Universities (February 28, 2017).
- E.O. 13230; White House Initiative on Educational Excellence for Hispanic Americans (October 17, 2001).
- E.O. 13270; Tribal Colleges and Universities (July 3, 2002).
- E.O. 13592; Improving American Indian and Alaska Native Educational Opportunities and Strengthening Tribal Colleges and Universities (December 2, 2011) (revokes E.O. 12270).
- E.O. 14049; White House Initiative on Advancing Educational Equity, Excellence, and Economic Opportunity for Native Americans and Strengthening Tribal Colleges and Universities (October 11, 2021) (supersedes E.O. 13592)
- E.O. 13336; American Indian and Alaska Native Education (April 30, 2004).
- E.O. 13515; Increasing Federal Programs for Asian American Pacific Islanders (October 19, 2009).
- E.O. 13078; Increasing Employment of Adults with Disabilities (March 18, 1998).
- Amendment to E.O. 13078; To Expand the Role of the National Task Force on Employment of Adults With Disabilities To Include a Focus on Youth (October 27, 2000).
