= Savoy (Taj Mahal album) =

Studio album by Taj Mahal
- Released: 2023
- Recorded: August 2022
- Studio: 25th Street Recording, Oakland, California, US
- Genre: Blues; Great American Songbook traditional pop; jazz
- Length: 58:35
- Language: English
- Label: Stony Plain
- Producer: Manny Moreira; John Simon

Taj Mahal chronology
The Underground Pipeline – Gainesville, FL Broadcast 1978 (2020)	Savoy (2023)	Swingin' Live at the Church in Tulsa (2024)

“Sometimes you just have to grow up. You can only feed ’em pablum for so long, and I never did. I don’t believe that people can grow if you pander to them. They’ll sit there and wait for you to put the spoon in their mouth.”

—Taj Mahal on musical experimentation on Savoy

Savoy is a 2023 studio album by American blues musician Taj Mahal. The recording is his first exploration of jazz and traditional pop and received positive reviews from critics.

== Reception ==
According to the review aggregator Metacritic, Savoy received "universal acclaim" based on a weighted average score of 88 out of 100 from six critic scores. Editors at AllMusic rated this album 4 out of 5 stars, with critic Thom Jurek writing that "this set offers blues-kissed reads of 14 tunes from the Great American Songbook" that "embodies the abundant joy of its predecessor, Get On Board: The Songs of Sonny Terry & Brownie McGhee" while "offer[ing] added nuance, color, dynamics, and musical sophistication" and "accomplishes the impossible by taking these (overly) familiar standards and breathing new life into them while simultaneously honoring their legacies as well as that of the historic Harlem ballroom"; the editorial board also chose this as one of the best blues albums of 2023. Lee Zimmerman of American Songwriter gave this 4 out of 5 stars, calling it "another triumph" in Mahal's discography, writing that "needless to say, Taj’s distinctive vocals and the backing band do justice to the material as far as revival and rejuvenation". Rock critic Robert Christgau rated Savoy an A, telling readers that "you owe it to yourself, and to history" to hear this music. Writing for Glide Magazine, Jim Hynes praised Mahal's phrasing and the musical arrangements by John Simon, but criticized the backing vocalists as not working with Mahal's singing.

No Depression's Grant Britt stated in a features on Mahal that, "the structures stay close to the originals, but Taj’s wheelbarrow-full-of-rocks-in-a-washing-machine vocals make them unique". At PopMatters, Steve Horowitz rated this release an 8 out of 10 for being "a lively record that snaps like a pair of hipster’s digits". In Relix, Jeff Tamarkin called this players and song choices on this album a "can’t-lose setup" that made for a release "that instantly ranks as one of the most enjoyable this American treasure, 55 years removed from his solo debut, has ever recorded". Savoy was an editor's pick in Spill Magazine, where Ljubinko Zivkovic rated it 9 out of 10, praising Mahal's ability to research the history of music and contextualize it with his blues styling, summing up "with such knowledge and personal touch the only thing you can get is some exceptional music". Clive Davis of The Times rated Savoy 4 out of 5 stars, praising how "husky vocals flat above a loose-limbed band", with recordings that prove that "Mahal has this repertoire in his blood".

== Track listing ==
1. "Stompin’ at the Savoy" (Edgar Sampson) – 3:44
2. "I’m Just a Lucky So and So" (Duke Ellington and Mack David) – 3:23
3. "Gee Baby, Ain’t I Good to You" (Andy Razaf and Don Redman) – 3:51
4. "Summertime" (George Gershwin) – 2:49
5. "Mood Indigo" (Barney Bigard, Ellington, and Irving Mills) – 4:09
6. "Is You Is or Is You Ain’t My Baby" (Billy Austin and Louis Jordan) – 4:36
7. "Do Nothin’ Till You Hear from Me" (Ellington and Bob Russell) – 5:06
8. "Sweet Georgia Brown" (Ben Bernie, Kenneth Casey, and Maceo Pinkard) – 3:18
9. "Baby It’s Cold Outside" (Frank Loesser) – 4:31
10. "Lady Be Good" (George Gershwin and Ira Gershwin) – 3:53
11. "Baby Won’t You Please Come Home" (Charles Warfield and Clarence Williams) – 3:25
12. "Caldonia" (Jordan) – 3:32
13. "Killer Joe" (Benny Golson) – 4:09
14. "One for My Baby" (Harold Arlen and Johnny Mercer) – 8:09

== Personnel ==
- Taj Mahal – guitar, vocals
- Hal Batt – mixing
- Jacob Batt – mastering
- Sheldon Brown – alto saxophone, clarinet, tenor saxophone
- Danny Caron – guitar
- Sandy Cressman – background vocals
- Ruth Davies – bass guitar
- Sandy Griffith – background vocals
- Carla Holbrook – background vocals
- Leesa Humphrey – background vocals
- Erik Jekabson – trumpet
- Mike Rinta - trombone
- Leon Joyce, Jr – drums
- Geoff Kulawick – executive production
- Charlotte McKinnon – background vocals
- Manny Moreira – production
- Maria Muldaur – vocal on "Baby It's Cold Outside"
- Holger Petersen – executive production
- Evan Price – violin on "Sweet Georgia Brown"
- Gabriel Shepard – engineering
- John Simon – piano, production
- Kirsten Strom – saxophone
- Leah Tysse – background vocals

== See also ==
- 2023 in American music
- List of 2023 albums
