= Teresa Knox =

American preservationist, philanthropist, and media producer

- Born: Tulsa, Oklahoma
- Education: MBA
- Alma mater: Oral Roberts University
- Years active: 1995 to Present
- Notable work: "Sanctuary of Sound"
- Honours: Tulsa Hall of Fame
- Website: https://www.schoolofhardknox.com/

Teresa Knox is an American businesswoman, historic preservationist, developer, and entertainment producer. She is the founder and former CEO of Community Care College, Clary Sage College, and Oklahoma Technical College which were started in 1995. She converted the colleges from a for-profit corporation to a public charity in 2015. In 2016, she bought and restored the recording studio, The Church Studio. A historic preservationist, Knox purchased and restored the Harwelden Mansion. Knox owns multiple commercial properties and has created a neighborhood called Studio Row. Knox produces the YouTube channel for The Church Studio which includes the shows Church Studio Legends and the Legacy Concert Series.

== Early life and business career ==
Knox was born in Tulsa, Oklahoma. She graduated with an MBA from Oral Roberts University. In high school, Knox worked for Sonic Drive-In for three years. Knox started her professional career as a dental assistant at age 18 years. After that, she had the idea of opening a dental assisting school, Community Care College, which Knox founded in 1995. the licensed and accredited institution of higher learning expanded later to include Clary Sage College and Oklahoma Technical College. After 20 years after its inception, Knox converted the colleges from a for-profit organization to a nonprofit organization in 2015. This unusual move was among the few nationwide approved by the United States Department of Education. The Colleges were acquired by a nonprofit founded by Knox, Community HigherEd, and she stepped down as CEO on December 31, 2015.

== Preservation ==
In 2016, Knox purchased a recording studio, The Church Studio, which was once owned by Tulsa native musician Leon Russell during the 1970s. In 2017, The Church Studio's building was added to the National Register of Historic Places of Tulsa County, Oklahoma. It took over five years to restore the property, which is now open as a recording studio, tourist attraction, music museum, and audio engineering school. Knox is CEO. She has worked on developing the neighborhood "Studio Row" surrounding the studio.

=== Roy Clark Archive ===
The Church Studio became the permanent home of the personal and professional archives of Country Music Hall of Fame member Roy Clark in 2026. Widow of Clark, Barbara Clark, donated the collection which includes photographs, awards, concert posters, TV scripts, stage and television wardrobe, memorabilia, and a vast collection of stringed instruments.

Knox described the acquisition as personally significant because Clark’s financial support of Tulsa’s Children’s Medical Center helped provide services for children with disabilities, including her brother Stevie, who has cerebral palsy. The Church Studio assumed responsibility of archives and making it available for public study and exhibition.

For The Church Studio, Knox has interviewed Kenny Loggins, Rita Coolidge, John Ford Coley, Jimmy Webb, Wes Studi, Mike Campbell (musician), Taj Mahal (musician), Gary Busey, Graham Russell, Tommy Emmanuel, Freda Payne, Willis Alan Ramsey, Bill Champlin, George Thorogood, David Teegarden, Jamie Oldaker and Claudia Lennear to name a few. Knox has produced films, including Man in Bronze and Mural of Space and Time, which was part of the Sundance Film Festival at Circle Cinema.

In 2017, Knox was named Tulsan of the Year by the Tulsa World.

In May 2018, Knox purchased and restored the historic property, Harwelden Mansion, a 1923 built, 15,000 square-foot Collegiate Gothic-Tudor styled mansion. The property is situated on one full city block, is located in the historic neighborhood of Maple Ridge, Tulsa and is minutes from the Gathering Place (Tulsa park). Harwelden Mansion is a boutique hotel and event center. The building was added to the National Register of Historic Places of Tulsa County, Oklahoma in 1978.

In 2023, Knox founded the annual music festival, Carney Fest. Tulsa Mayor G. T. Bynum declared April 15, 2023, "Teresa Knox Day."

In 2025, Taj Mahal thanked Knox during his acceptance speech for Best Traditional Blues Album at the 67th Annual Grammy Awards.

== Personal life ==
Knox and her husband, Ivan Acosta, were married in 1998. They have three children and live in Tulsa.
