= Harwelden Mansion =

Mansion in Tulsa, Oklahoma, U.S.

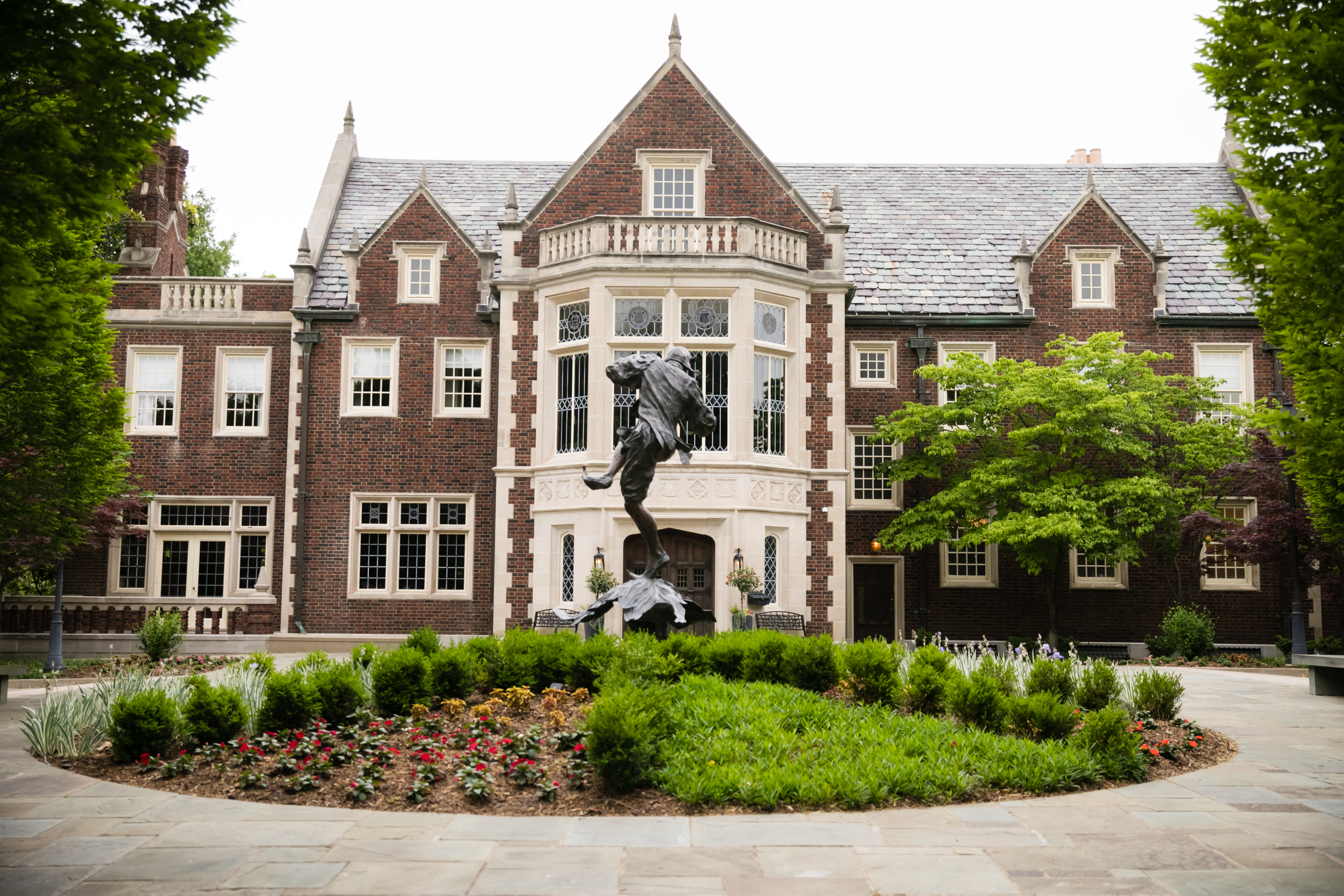
Harwelden Mansion

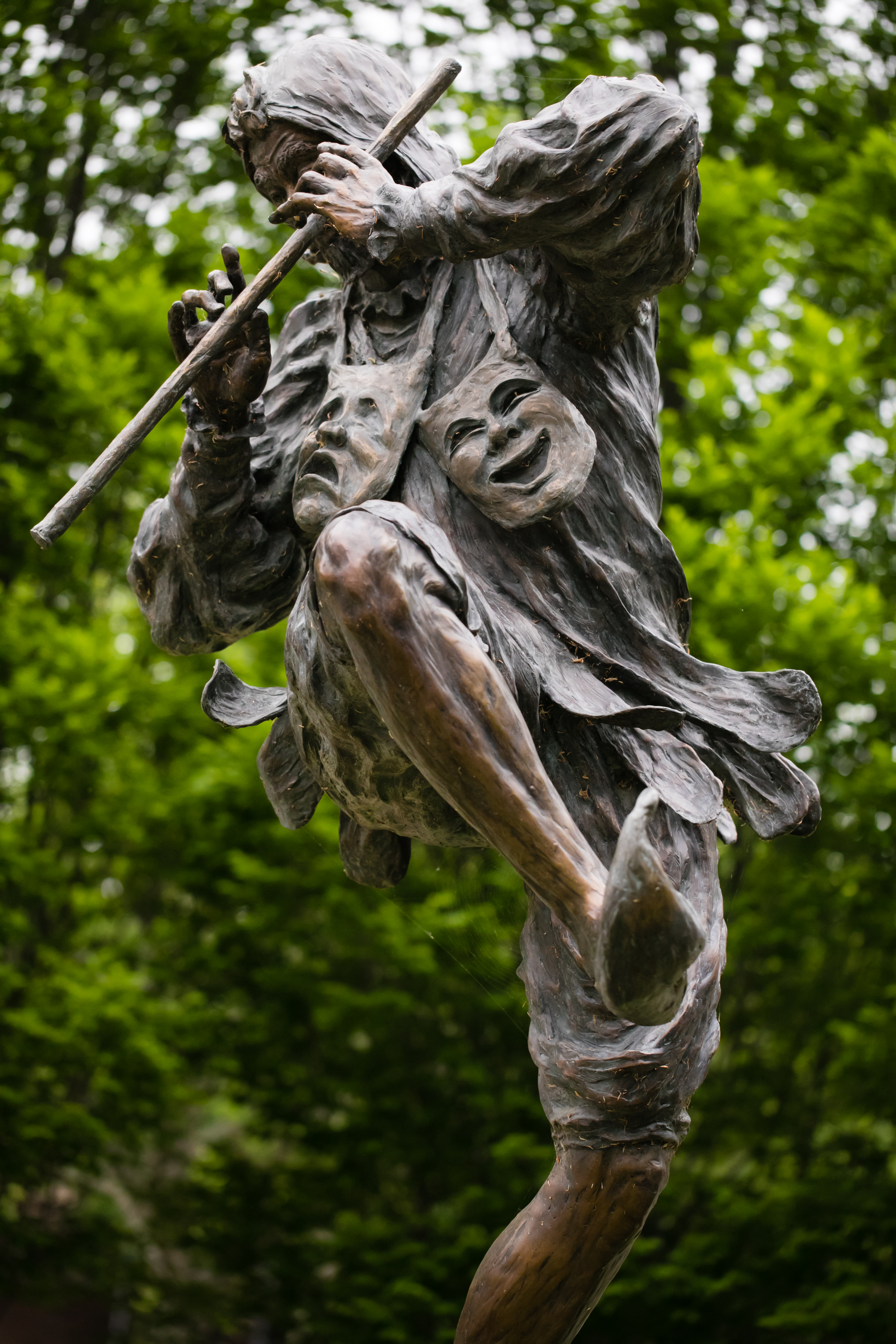
Bronze Statue

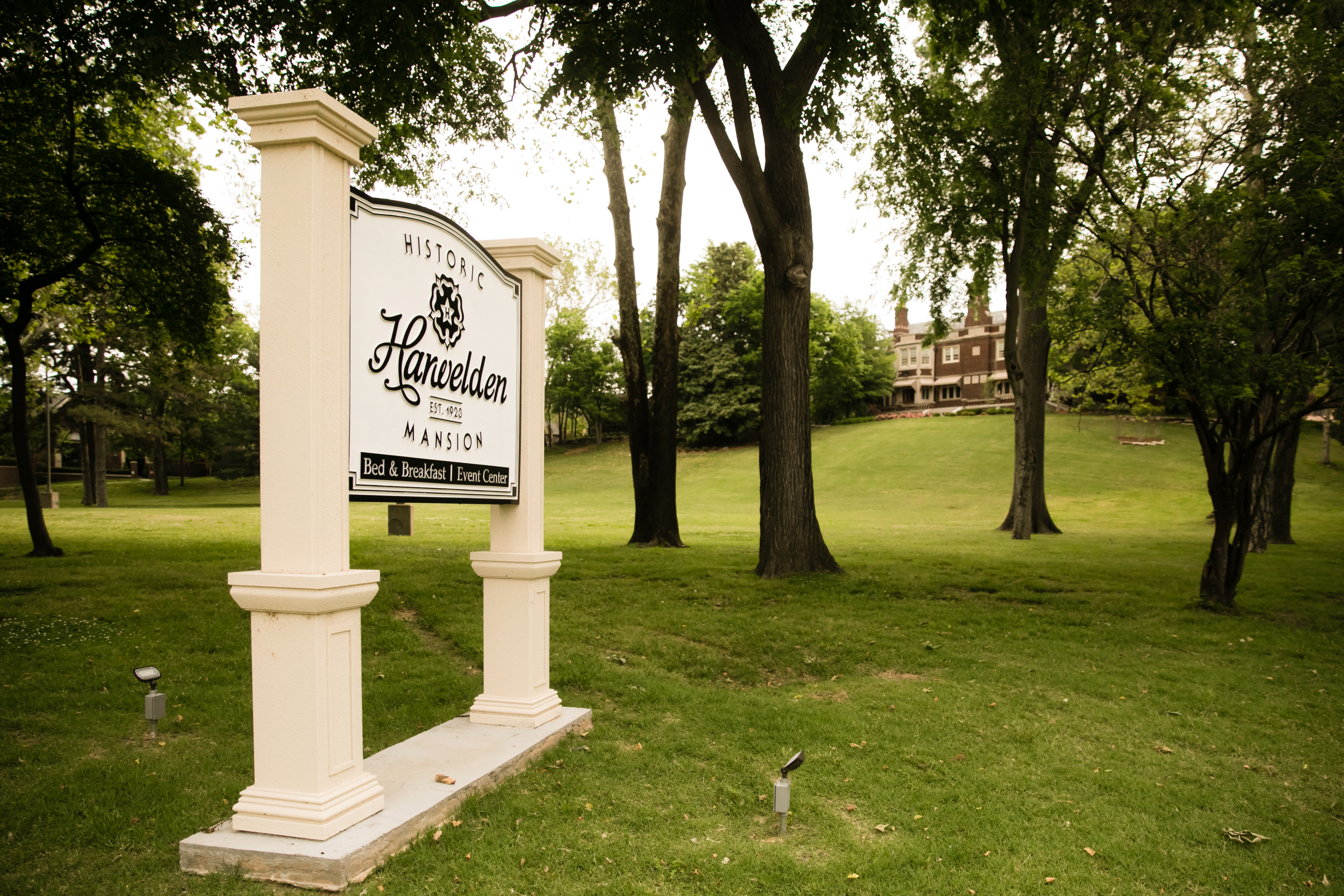
Harwelden Mansion Bed and Breakfast, west view overlooking the Arkansas River

Harwelden is a historical building, also known as Harwelden Mansion, and is an English Tudor-styled mansion with Collegiate Gothic elements in Tulsa, Oklahoma, United States, that is an Event Center and Bed and Breakfast. It was built in 1923 by a businessman and philanthropist, Earl P. Harwell. Previously owned by the Tulsa Arts and Humanities Society (AHHA), it is now owned and renovated by Teresa Knox in 2018. The mansion sits on one full city block overlooking the Arkansas River, minutes from the world-renowned Gathering Place.

It was listed on the National Register of Historic Places in 1978. The mansion and grounds were also documented by the Historic American Buildings Survey in 2009. Additionally, it sits within the NRHP-listed Riverside Historic Residential District, roughly bounded by the Midland Railway Bike Trail on the east, the Riverside View and Riverside Drive plats on the south, Riverside Drive and S. Boston Avenue on the west, and E. 21st and 24th Sts. on the north, which is an area known for Tudor Revival as well as Colonial Revival architectural styles.

== History ==
In 1923, a Tulsa-native businessman and philanthropist, Earl Palmer Harwell and his wife Mary built the Collegiate Gothic and English Tudor styled mansion, named Harwelden. It was designed and constructed by architects Wight and Wight and Long Construction from Kansas City, Missouri. Interior design was by William A. Franch and Company of Minneapolis, including for paneling, plaster-ornamented ceilings, oriental carpets and furnishings. The historic mansion was built when Tulsa was known as Oil Capital of the World.

Following the deaths of Harwell in 1950 and his wife's in 1967, the mansion was donated to the Arts Council of Tulsa. When the house was left to the Arts and Humanities Council, it included the original staircase runners, the living room rug, the lighting fixtures, selected furniture, and draperies, while most furnishings were bequeathed to relatives.

The mansion served as a headquarter for Arts Council of Tulsa and its governing body, AHHA Tulsa from 1969 to 2012. In February 1978, the mansion was added to the National Register of Historic Places of Tulsa County, Oklahoma.

=== Ownership ===
In 2019, the building is owned by Tulsa-native businesswoman Teresa Knox and her husband, Ivan Acosta. In May 2018, they purchased the mansion for $2.9 million and spent millions more during a two-year renovation.

The Harwelden Mansion is the sister property to The Church Studio and often houses celebrity artists that perform or record at the studio such as Kenny Loggins, Air Supply and Trace Adkins.

=== Programming ===
The historic mansion now serves as an event center, wedding venue, and bed and breakfast. The Harwelden Mansion offers various programming including traditional English Afternoon Tea and historic tours.

The Harwelden Mansion is rented for filming and has been used by A&E, Discovery Channel, SiriusXM, ABC Network, Mike Rowe, and various television channels.

Following the purchase of the mansion by Knox, a historic mailbox was stolen from the building but has since been replaced.
