= QuikTrip =

American convenience store chain

QuikTrip Corporation

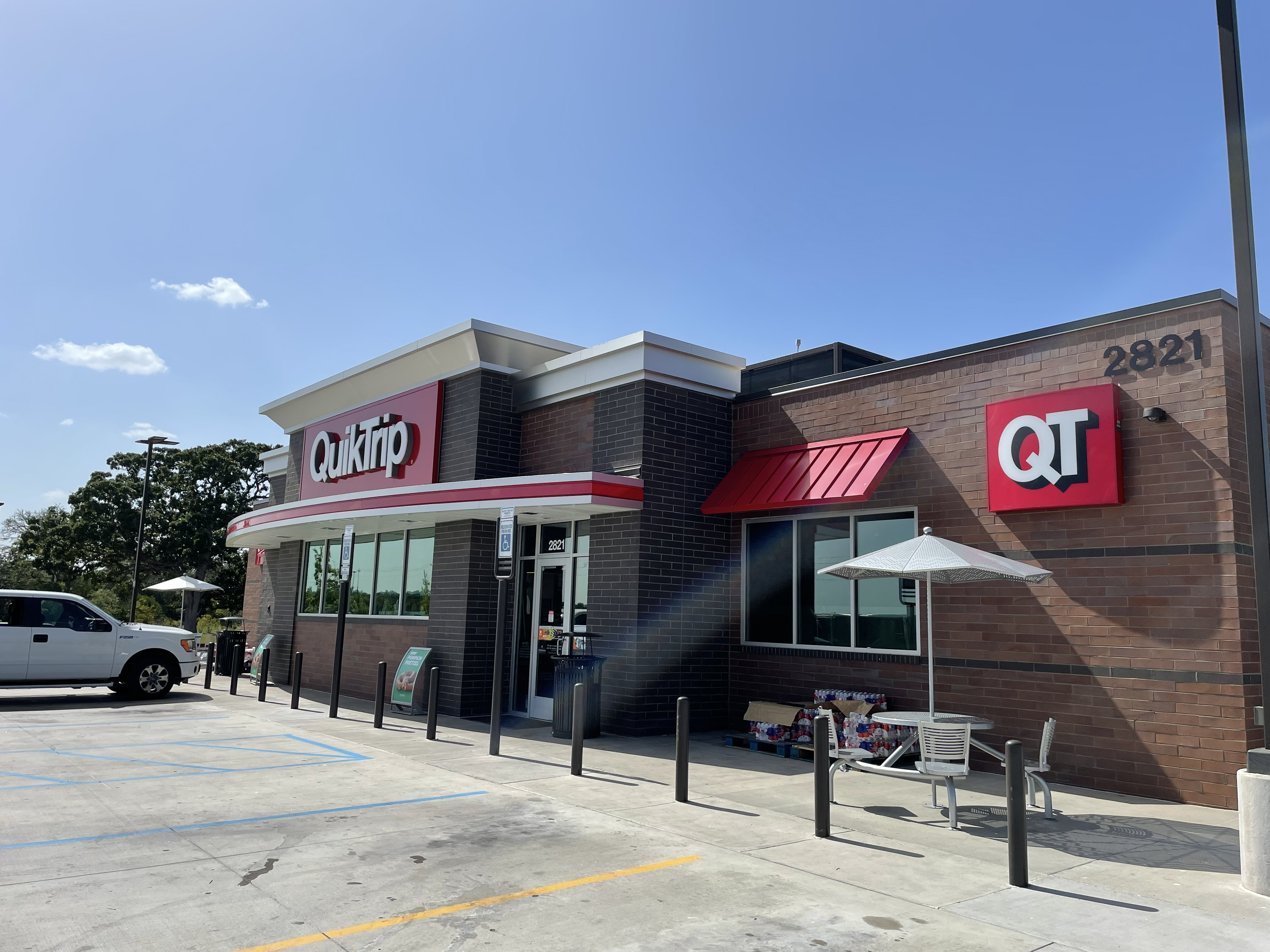
- QuikTrip location in Cedar Park, Texas
- Type: Private
- Industry: Retail
- Founded: September 25, 1958 (68 years ago) in Tulsa, Oklahoma, U.S.
- Founders: Burt Holmes; Chester Cadieux Sr.
- Headquarters: Tulsa, Oklahoma, United States
- Number of locations: 1,201 (February 2026)
- Area served: Midwestern, Southern, Western United States
- Key people: Chester "Chet" Cadieux Jr. (president and CEO)
- Products: Coffee; Hoagies; Prepared foods; Gasoline; Beverages; Snacks; Dairy products; Salads
- Services: Convenience store; Gas station; Fast food
- Revenue: ▲US$14.16 billion (FY 2024)
- Owner: Cadieux family Employees (20%)
- Number of employees: 31,000 (March 2025)
- Website: www.quiktrip.com

The QuikTrip Corporation, more commonly known as QuikTrip (QT), is an American chain of convenience stores based in Tulsa, Oklahoma, that operates in the Midwestern, Southern, and Western United States.

The first QuikTrip was opened in 1958 in Tulsa by Burt Holmes and Chester Cadieux. The company expanded outside of Oklahoma in 1968, and started selling gasoline in 1971. Chester's son, Chester "Chet" Cadieux Jr., is the current CEO.

In 2005, QuikTrip and Chevron were the first two retailers to earn a "Top Tier" rating from General Motors, BMW, Honda, Volkswagen, Audi, and Toyota. The "Top Tier" rating exceeds the United States Environmental Protection Agency's standards for gasoline additives.

QuikTrip was ranked as one of the 100 Best Companies to Work For. In January 2006, QT ranked No. 21, ninth among companies classified as "mid-size". In 2008, QT was ranked No. 27 on Fortune's Top 100 list. QuikTrip often uses this fact in recruiting new employees. QuikTrip also ranked No. 33 on Forbes magazine's list of largest private companies in 2016. In 2024, QuikTrip ranked second in the American Customer Satisfaction Index's survey of convenience stores, behind Pennsylvania-based chain Wawa.

== History ==
While driving through Dallas, Burt Holmes was intrigued by the success of 7-Eleven and decided to open a small grocery store in his home town of Tulsa. He took on classmate Chester Cadieux as a partner in his planned venture. Holmes and Cadieux each invested $5,000, and three other investors put up $2,000 each for the venture.

The first QuikTrip store was opened in a Tulsa strip mall in 1958, which sold a limited selection of groceries with high prices for the convenience. The chain grew rapidly, opening its first store outside Tulsa in 1964, expanding to Missouri in 1968 and Iowa in 1974. The company incorporated on May 19, 1958, originally naming the business Quick-Trip until Sam Karney, the art director of the sign shop, suggested the signage would be more balanced with four letters on each side. The "c" was dropped, and the name became Quik-Trip

QuikTrip began to sell gasoline in 1971 as states legalized self-service stations. In the early 1970s, co-founder Cadieux eliminated slow-moving merchandise from the stores' inventory, such as canned vegetables, and stocked a larger quantity of items priced low for high-volume sales, such as beer, soda, coffee, cigarettes, and candy. In 1976, it became one of the first convenience store chains to be open 24 hours a day. Also that year, it adopted its now-famous "QT" logo.

QuikTrip had its own branded goods marketed from the 1970s to the 1980s, including QT Beer—QT for "Quittin' Time". The ad campaign, "It's QT Time Again", would often show a dog named Lamar. The dog's owner was portrayed in television commercials by actor Ben Jones, who often asked the dog, "Ain't that right, Lamar?"

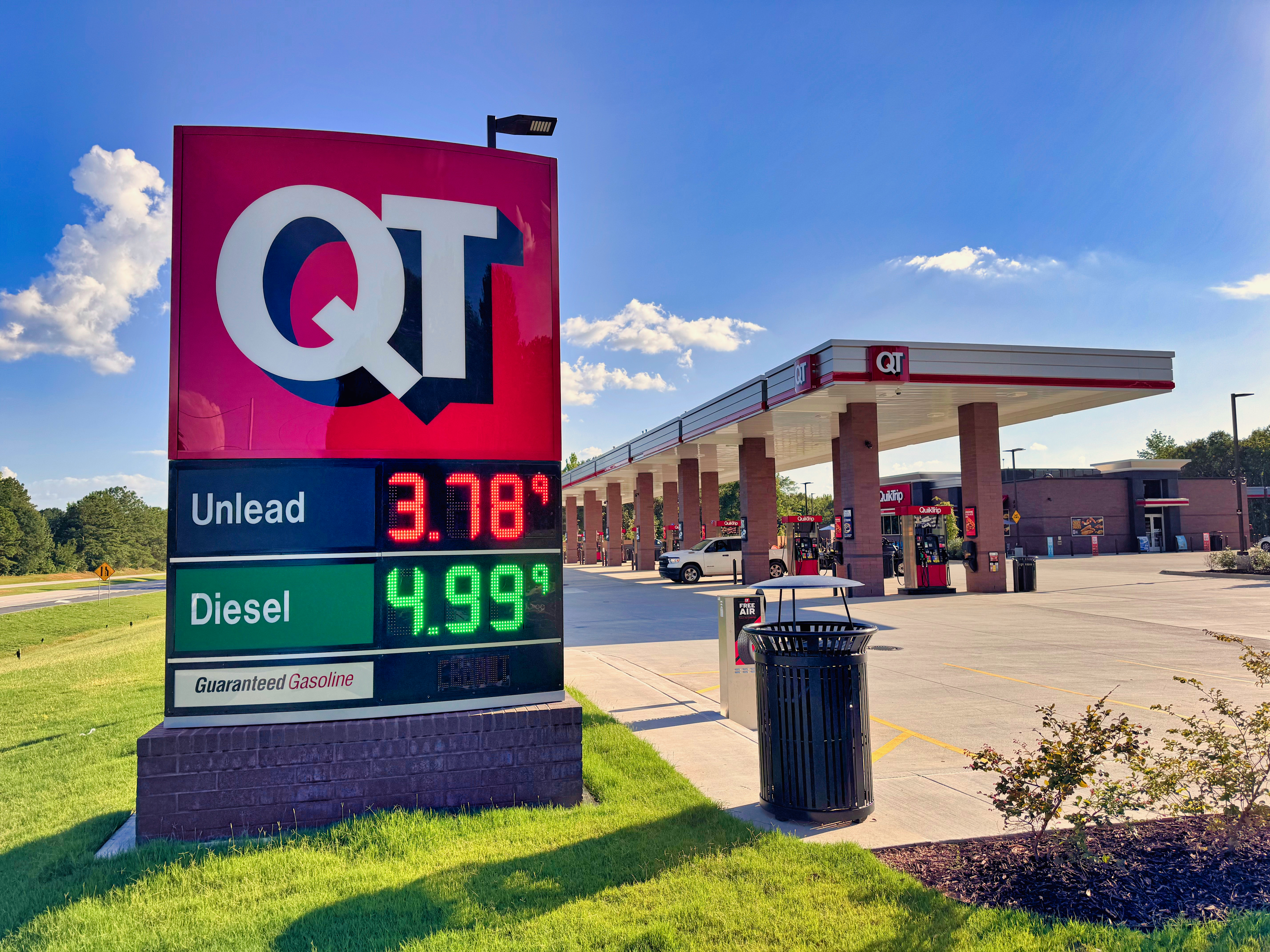
Exterior of a QuikTrip in Watkinsville, Georgia

In 1987, Cadieux was the first inductee into the Convenience Store Hall of Fame and was noted for being the first to offer self-serve fountain drinks, the first to design and offer a fast food module, the first to open a downtown convenience store, and the first to install personal computers in the stores and tie them to the company's mainframe.

In 1988, upon rapid expansions into the St. Louis and Atlanta markets, QuikTrip began a renovation of all stores, primarily replacing the earthtone exterior and interior with a bright red color scheme. The interior décor featured red countertops and a red quarry tile floor; with almond tile on the walls interspersed with painted red sections of the walls to create contrast. Some gold trim maintained continuity from the previous décor. The company also took more care with landscaping around the store. By the early 1990s, QuikTrip began to offer fast foods and fountain beverages at its stores, being the first convenience store to offer a self-serve soda fountain and a self-serve coffee bar. Expensive advertising led the company to phase out the private label beer by this time.

In 1994, QuikTrip acquired the former Memorex/Telex Communications headquarters in Tulsa and remodeled part of the building for its Oklahoma division. In 2003, QuikTrip decided to consolidate all employees into one corporate campus in south Tulsa and sold the building to Community Care College. In 2017, QuikTrip announced plans to expand into two additional markets in Texas, San Antonio and Austin. The first San Antonio store opened in October 2018, with three more locations opening in the following months. In 2019, Quiktrip announced plans through an internal video, that was also posted to their Instagram page, that they will be expanding into the Denver, Colorado market starting in 2022 with 5 stores planned for that year. They shared the video with the quote, "see you soon, Denver!" In October 2020, QuikTrip announced plans to enter the healthcare sector with 15 Tulsa-area MedWise Urgent Care clinics in the next two years.

In 2021, QuikTrip announced it would open its first stores in the Oklahoma City market, with its first two stores opening in 2024. This announcement coming shortly after 7 Eleven Inc acquired the 7 Eleven of Oklahoma stores after 67 years of independence from the global brand. The timing of QuikTrip's move into the OKC market brought rumors that the ownership of QuikTrip and the owners of 7 Eleven of Oklahoma had a deal to keep out of each other's markets as there never was a 7 Eleven store in Tulsa just as there had never been a QuikTrip in OKC.

In 2024, QuikTrip expanded into Ohio by opening locations in the Dayton, Ohio area. Dayton, which serves as a major long-haul crossroads for Interstate 70 & 75 and until 2022 served as the headquarters of Speedway in nearby Enon, has been a major target for convenience store expansion in recent years, with the area being targeted by Sheetz, Casey's, Wawa, RaceTrac, and Buc-ee's to compete with the area's traditional competitors Speedway and Circle K. QuikTrip's arrival in the area beat all of the aforementioned chains except Sheetz and Casey's.

In April 2025, QuikTrip opened its store in Indiana for the first time with its inaugural Hoosier State location opening in Daleville. This move comes as part of QuikTrip's aggressive 2025 expansion strategy, which includes multiple new locations across the Midwest. 2025 also saw the return of Quittin' Time Beer through a partnership with Tulsa craft brewers Marshall Brewing. Initially only available in Tulsa-area stores as a nostalgia item, its distribution has since expanded into its Kansas and Missouri locations. In February 2026, QuikTrip entered Florida by opening a store in Jefferson County, Florida In July 2026, QuikTrip opens its first Utah store in Marriott-Slaterville.

== Products and services ==
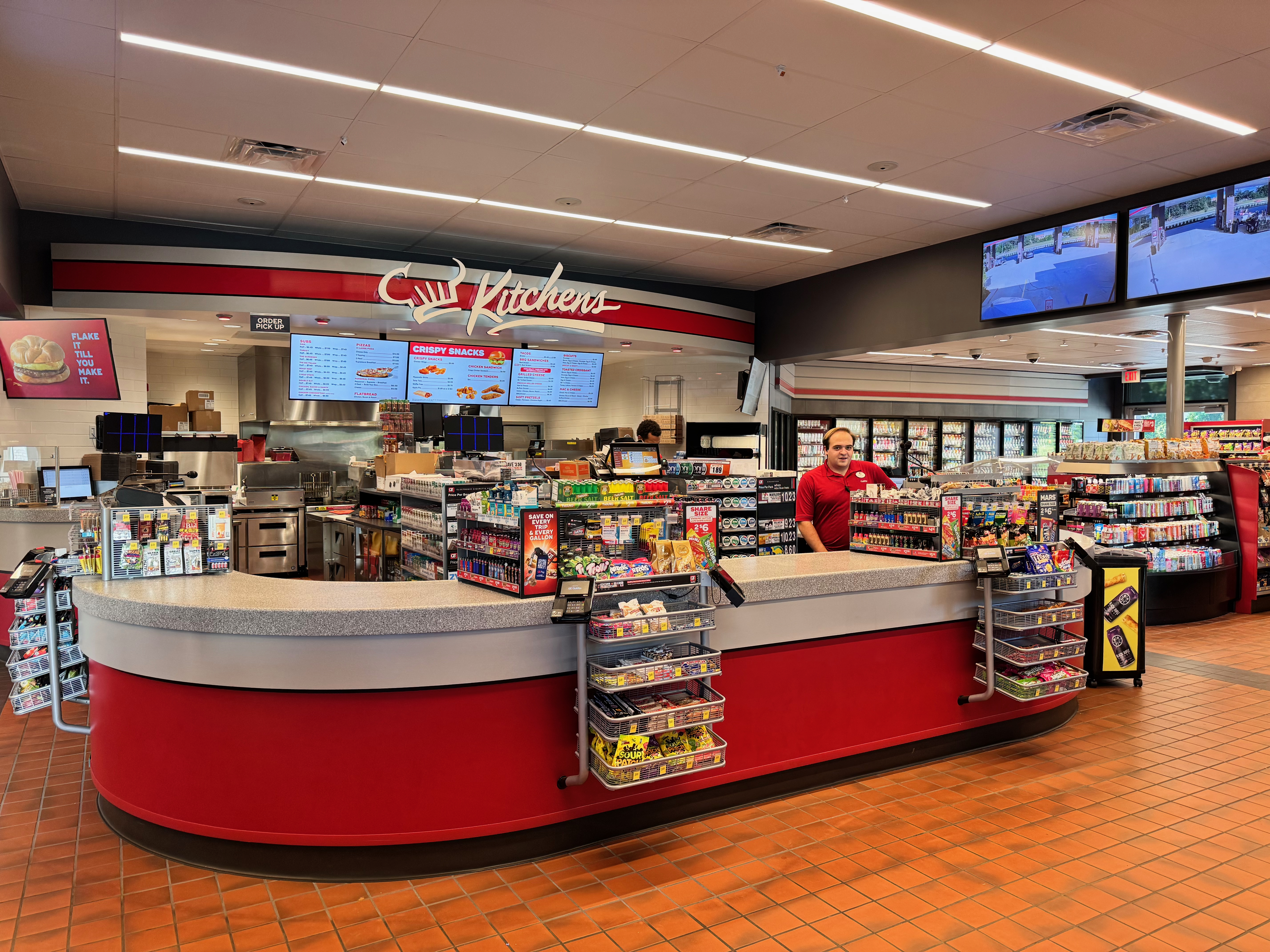
Interior of a typical QuikTrip store

In an attempt to increase speed and improve customer service at checkout, QuikTrip asks customers to stand at the counter versus standing in a long line. Employees are taught at orientation to go provide assistance on an additional register when the customer to cashier ratio exceeds 3:1, and to direct customers to the closest available checkout.

Since the early 1990s, QuikTrip has sold a private label brand of fast food, "Quick 'n Tasty" and "HOTZI sandwiches". "Quick 'n Tasty" heat-and-serve sandwiches include Texas Ham and Cheese, BarBQ Pork Rib, and the Super Po Boy. "HOTZI" breakfast sandwiches included the sausage, egg, and cheese biscuit and the breakfast burrito.

In 2012, QuikTrip began an initiative of offering fresh food made daily at its own bakery and commissary referred to as QT Kitchens. The products includes fresh sandwiches, wraps, salads, fruit, and various pastries made and delivered daily. Since then, QuikTrip has expanded the "QT Kitchens" brand to include actual kitchens in their stores with made-to-order hot food as well as specialty drinks. The company also retrofitted their older style stores to include the new kitchen operations, in addition to building entirely new "Gen 3" stores. These stores feature multiple entrances, a common floor-plan (coffee and tea, baked goods, grocery items and liquor in one wing; fountain sodas, hot dogs, chips and bottled non-alcoholic drinks in the other; and a deli case with sandwiches and candy in the middle) and are centered around the QT Kitchens counter, which provides made-to-order food as well as a grab-and-go selection of breakfast sandwiches in the morning and pizza slices in the afternoon and evening.

=== Travel centers ===
During rapid expansion in the late 1980s, some QuikTrip stores included large 'travel centers.' A smaller version of a truck stop, the travel centers included a 5,000-square-foot store, 12 gasoline pumps, five diesel pumps with an elevated canopy to accommodate large trucks, a truck scale, and a store to serve the needs of truck drivers.

=== Dual-branded stores ===
In 1994, QuikTrip began test-marketing a dual-brand concept in St. Louis, Kansas City, Springfield, and Atlanta, where a 3,000-square-foot Wendy's store was attached to each QuikTrip convenience store. In Des Moines, QuikTrip opened a new store with a Burger King with a separate entry and a drive-through window, but a passageway allowing movement between the convenience store and the restaurant.

=== Non-traditional stores ===
In October 2007, QuikTrip opened a store within the T-Mobile Center in Kansas City, Missouri. The location only offered concessions and not gasoline. The store was closed in mid-2013. The company's second store without gasoline—store No.1700— opened in midtown Atlanta at the Viewpoint Midtown condominium building on Peachtree Street. This store also subsequently closed in May 2024.

In 2008, QuikTrip signed an agreement with the city of Grand Prairie, Texas for naming rights to the Grand Prairie AirHogs' new stadium, to be named QuikTrip Park. The deal included a QuikTrip booth at the stadium selling QT Kitchens products at the park for store price.

== Locations ==
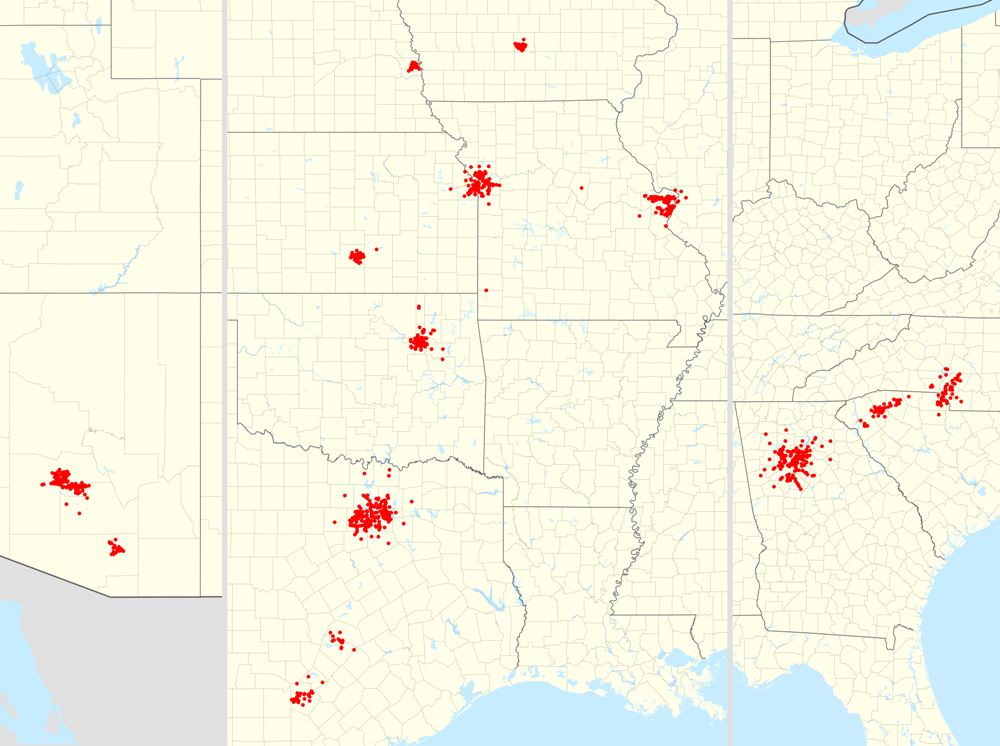
Map of QuikTrip locations as of October 2020.

QuikTrip operates over 1000 stores, which are located in the following areas of the United States:

- Alabama: Tuscaloosa metro (1 Store)
- Alabama: Auburn metro (1 Store)
- Arizona: Phoenix metro (102 stores)
- Arizona: Tucson metro (20 stores)
- Arkansas: Little Rock metro (2 stores)
- Colorado: Front Range Urban Corridor (23 stores)
- Florida: Florida Panhandle (2 stores)
- Georgia: Atlanta metro (139 stores)
- Illinois: Bloomington–Normal, Champaign–Urbana, Chicago, and Rockford metros, plus Effingham, Mount Vernon, and Peru (18 stores; not including locations in the Metro East area counted with Missouri)
- Indiana: Muncie area (1 store)
- Iowa: Des Moines metro (33 stores)
- Kansas: Wichita metro (39 stores)
- Kansas / Missouri: Kansas City metropolitan area (89 stores)
- Louisiana: Shreveport metro (2 stores)
- Louisiana: West Monroe metro (1 store)
- Mississippi: Jackson metro (5 stores)
- Missouri: Joplin metro (2 stores)
- Missouri / Illinois: St. Louis metro (75 stores)
- Nebraska: Omaha metro (16 stores)
- Nevada: Las Vegas Valley (1 store)
- North Carolina / South Carolina: Charlotte metro (48 stores)
- North Carolina: Asheville Metro (1 store)
- Oklahoma: Oklahoma City metro (2 stores)
- Oklahoma: Tulsa metro (82 stores)
- Remote Store Network: Lindale, Texas; Waco, Texas (2 stores)
- South Carolina: Greenville / Spartanburg metro (27 Stores)
- South Carolina: Columbia metro (3 stores)
- Tennessee: Memphis metro (2 stores)
- Tennessee: Nashville metro (4 stores)
- Tennessee: Chattanooga (2 stores)
- Texas: Dallas/Fort Worth metroplex (156 stores)
- Texas: Austin, Texas / San Antonio metro (62 stores)
- Texas: Amarillo, Texas (2 stores)
- Texas: Abilene, Texas (1 store)
- Texas: Houston (3 stores)
- Texas: El Paso (1 store)
- Texas: Laredo, Texas (2 stores)
- Utah: Marriott-Slaterville (1 store)

All stores are owned and operated by the company.

In the Atlanta and Dallas/Fort Worth metro areas, QuikTrip competes head to head with RaceTrac, an Atlanta-based convenience store chain that is very similar to QuikTrip inside and out. Both chains tend to have new clean facilities with abundant on-site lighting and a large convenience area. In many cases, the two competitors are located directly across the street or on opposite street corners from one another. In 2017, QuikTrip began expansion into the Austin and San Antonio metro areas, in direct competition with another similar rival, Buc-ee's. QuikTrip entered the Abilene, Texas market on June 3, 2021, with a travel center at Old Anson Road and Interstate 20.

Because the company operates stores in Iowa and Illinois, and retains the trademarks to the name within those states, competing chain Kwik Trip uses a different name for their stores in those states, Kwik Star.

As mentioned above, despite its Oklahoma base QuikTrip traditionally did not operate in Oklahoma City or its suburbs due to an informal agreement with the Brown family, owners of the 7-Eleven franchise in that area, where both chains did not infringe on each other's territory. For much of its history, 7-Eleven stores in OKC operated under a long-standing license and differed slightly from the national chain; when the parent company bought out the Browns in 2020, QuikTrip soon after announced plans to build locations in the state's capital. A similar non-competition agreement exists in North Carolina with the Sheetz chain, which is also privately owned and operates on a similar business model; QuikTrip has territorial rights to the greater Charlotte market, while Sheetz operates stores in much of the rest of the state.

QuikTrip has 102 locations in the Phoenix metropolitan area, but none located within the city limits of suburban Scottsdale. This is due to a city ordinance that regulates the design and build of gas and service stations within city limits. Neither the city nor the company will give in to the other (QuikTrip will not build a station conforming to the ordinance and Scottsdale will not make an exception for QuikTrip), therefore Scottsdale is the only city in the Phoenix area without a QuikTrip.

The company has run into similar issues in Overland Park, Kansas, but it is more from a desire to make the city more "pedestrian-friendly".
