= Maple Ridge, Tulsa =

- Maple Ridge Historic Residential District
- U.S. National Register of Historic Places
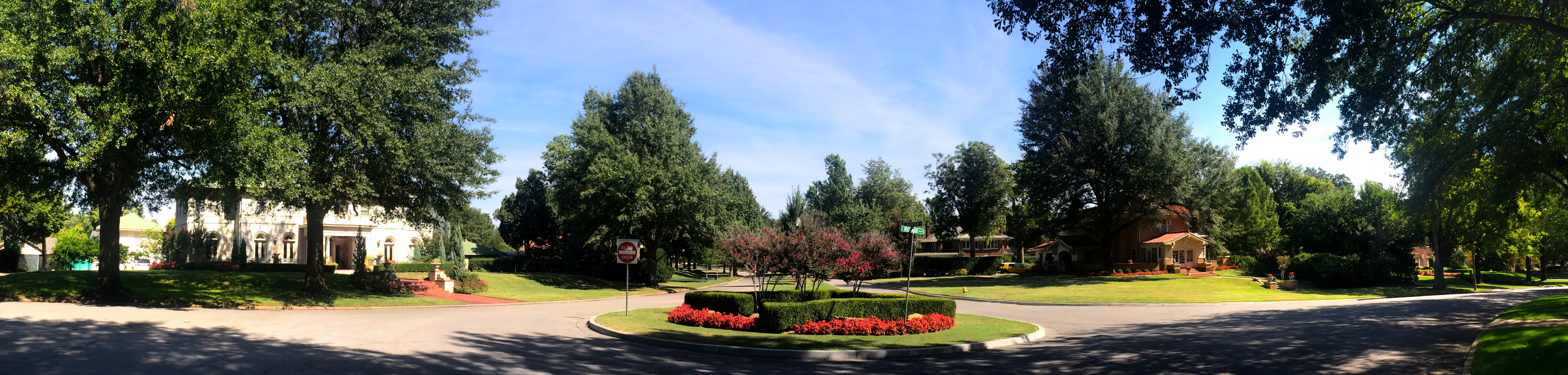
- Panorama from the Madison Avenue roundabout
- Location: Tulsa, OK
- Coordinates: 36.13336°N 95.97964°W
- Architects: Blair, John
- Architectural style: Late 19th and 20th Century Revivals, Prairie School, Bungalow/craftsman
- NRHP reference No.: 83002138
- Added to NRHP: April 6, 1983

Maple Ridge is a neighborhood and historic district in Tulsa, Oklahoma. It is bounded by the Inner Dispersal Loop (Highway 51) on the north, Hazel Boulevard on the south, Peoria Avenue on the east and the Midland Valley Railroad right of way on the west. The northern portion of the district, between 15th Street and 21st Street, has been zoned with Historic Preservation Overlay Zoning by the City of Tulsa and is called North Maple Ridge.

== NRHP listing ==
Maple Ridge Historic District (MRHD) was the first Tulsa neighborhood to be listed in the Oklahoma Landmarks Inventory. It was placed on the National Register of Historic Places on April 6, 1983, under National Register Criteria A and C. Its NRIS number is 83002138. The period of significance is given as 1912-1932. The district contains about 700 single-family residences

The Maple Ridge Historic District is significant because the development of the Maple Ridge area paralleled the growth of the banking and petroleum industry in Tulsa in the early 20th century. The people who built their homes in Maple Ridge made their wealth in the Glenn Pool Oil Strike of 1905, and the Cushing strike of 1912.

== General description ==
One of the largest historic areas in Tulsa, Maple Ridge encompasses many residential subdivisions beginning with the Southside Addition, platted in 1907. Entrepreneur Grant C. Stebbins was one of the developers and built his own home there in 1915. Although residential construction spans nearly thirty years, Maple Ridge's north, central, south and southwest sectors are contiguous and similar in style and scale. Large lots and homes were governed by the state's first subdivision regulations. However, nearly every combination of architectural styles imaginable is represented. The north neighborhood is the oldest and is largely made up of two-story brick and clapboarded mansions dating from approximately 1912. The central sector is a later and larger version of the northern mansions. The south and southwest sectors date from the late 1920s through the early 1930s with smaller two-story brick bungalows, Spanish stuccos, and adaptations of classical styles.

Architectural styles appearing in the MRHD include Italianate, Georgian Revival, Neo-Classical Revival, Federal and Colonial styles, Gothic, Tudor, Jacobethan, several Prairie styles, bungalows, and cottages.

Skelly House at 21st Street and Madison Avenue in Maple Ridge Historic District, Tulsa

The former home of Mr. and Mrs William G. Skelly is in the MRHD. The Skellys bought the house at 2107 Madison Avenue in 1923. Skelly's widow, Gertrude, donated the house and its furnishings to the University of Tulsa (TU) in 1957. TU sold the house to private owners in 1959, then repurchased it in 2012. It is now designated as Skelly House and serves as the home of the TU president. The house was added to the National Register of Historic Places in 1978.

Harwelden Mansion is an English Tudor mansion built in 1923 by oil baron E.P. Harwell and his wife, Mary Harwell which now serves as an Event Center and Bed and Breakfast. Other notable Maple Ridge homeowners included J. J. McGraw and Arthur Newlin, president and vice-president, respectively of Exchange National Bank (then the largest bank in Tulsa and direct ancestor of present-day BOK, the largest bank in Oklahoma); Waite Phillips, entrepreneur and builder of the Philtower and the present-day Philbrook Museum.

== Maple Ridge Association ==
The Maple Ridge Association was formed in 1964.and has been active since.
