= Road Ranger =

American Convenience Store Chain

Road Ranger, L.L.C.
- Company type: Private
- Industry: Retail (truck stops) (convenience stores)
- Founded: 1984; 42 years ago
- Headquarters: Schaumburg, Illinois
- Number of locations: 74 (Stores & Restaurants)
- Key people: Marko Zaro (CEO); Jorge Ortega (CFO)
- Revenue: $1.0 billion (2012)
- Number of employees: 1,100
- Website: roadrangerusa.com

Road Ranger is a Schaumburg, Illinois-based chain of travel centers, truck stops and convenience stores primarily found in the mid-western United States.

== History ==
The first Road Ranger was opened in 1984 in Rockford, Illinois, by Northern Illinois University business graduate Daniel "Dan" Arnold. The first location was purchased with $5,000 of Arnold's savings and a loan taken out by him and his wife.

Arnold sold the company to Phillips Petroleum in 1990 to pursue other interests in real estate and banking, but eventually restarted the company in 1994.

In 2008 Pilot Flying J announced it was partnering with Road Ranger and would market the diesel fuel at Road Ranger truck stop locations.

Road Ranger was owned by Daniel Arnold and co-owner Sunil Puri, founder of First Midwest Group. Arnold died on November 17, 2015.

On March 19, 2015, Road Ranger completed the sale of 42 convenience store locations in Iowa, Illinois and Kentucky to GPM Investments, leaving its focus on travel centers, usually in partnership with Pilot at that time.

On August 27, 2018, Santiago Chile based Enex (Empresa Nacional de Energía Enex S.A.), a subsidiary of Quiñenco, announced its intention to acquire Road Ranger for US$289 million, in what is believed to be the largest private company sale in Rockford, Illinois history.

On November 30, 2018 Enex announced it had completed the Road Ranger acquisition and announced its plans to grow Road Ranger in the US by three to four locations per year.

In early 2019 Road Ranger ended its relationship across the United States with Pilot Flying J. As of February 1, 2019, Road Ranger marketed diesel fuel to trucking companies and transportation providers across the United States under the Road Ranger trade name, unaffiliated with any other company or name.

== Top Tier Gasoline ==
Road Ranger distributes Top Tier Detergent Gasoline in its own branded Ranger Fuels offering, although in 2010 this was not available at all locations.

== Locations ==
Road Ranger operates 53 unaffiliated travel center and convenience store locations in the states of Illinois, Iowa, Indiana, Missouri, Texas, Arkansas and Wisconsin. There are 34 associated Subway Restaurants, Wendy's, Dickey's Barbecue Pit, Church's Chicken, Chester's International, Burger King, McDonald's, and other food franchises.

== Dixie Truck Stop ==
In 2012 Road Ranger purchased, remodeled, and began operating the Dixie Travel Plaza. Opened in 1928, the Dixie is one of the USA's original, and oldest truck stops.
