= Top Tier Detergent Gasoline =

Performance specifications and trademarks for fuel

Logo of Top Tier Detergent Gasoline

Logo of Top Tier Diesel Fuel

Top Tier Detergent Gasoline and Top Tier Diesel Fuel (both stylized TOP TIER) are performance specifications and trademarks for fuel, designed and supported by several automakers. BMW, General Motors (GM), Fiat Chrysler Automobiles, Ford, Honda (incl. Acura), Toyota, Volkswagen, Mercedes-Benz, Navistar, Audi, and Volvo support the gasoline standard, while General Motors, Volkswagen, Detroit Diesel, and Navistar support the diesel standard (as of 2018). Top Tier fuels must maintain levels of detergent additives that are believed to result in a higher standard of engine cleanliness and performance as compared to the United States Environmental Protection Agency (EPA) requirement. In addition, Top Tier fuels may not contain metallic additives, which can harm the vehicle emission system and create pollutants. As of 2026, Top Tier Detergent Gasoline is available from 105 licensed retail brands, and Top Tier Diesel Fuel is available from 6.

Licensed Top Tier fuel retailers use a higher level of detergent additive which can increase fuel economy and optimal engine performance. According to a Honda spokesman, the regular use of this type of gasoline results in improved engine life.

The Top Tier standards must apply to all grades of gasoline or diesel that a company sells, whether it is economy (low-octane) or premium (high-octane).

== History ==
In the late 1980s, automakers became concerned with fuel additives as more advanced fuel injection technology became widely used in new cars. The injectors often became clogged, and the problem was found to be inadequate levels of detergent additives in some gasoline. The automakers began to recommend specific brands of gas with adequate content to their customers. But some fuel marketers were still not using detergents, and in a move supported by the auto industry, the federal government mandated specific levels of additives. The United States EPA introduced the minimum gasoline detergent standard in 1995.

However, the new regulations had unintended consequences. The new EPA standards required lower levels of detergent additives than were then being used by a few major fuel marketers. When the new regulations came in, most gasoline marketers who had previously provided higher levels of detergents reduced the level of detergents in their gasolines to meet the new standard. The EPA detergent additive levels were designed to meet emissions standards but not engine longevity standards. Automakers said they were seeing persistent problems such as clogged fuel injectors, and contaminated combustion chambers, resulting in higher emissions and lower fuel economy.

By 2002, the automakers said their repair records suggested that the EPA standard for detergents was not high enough, but the EPA was not responsive when they asked them to increase the standards. These concerns were heightened by plans to introduce a new generation of vehicles that would meet the EPA's Tier Two environmental standards for reduced emissions. These vehicles require higher levels of detergents to avoid reduced performance. Cars with gasoline direct injection (GDI) have been especially prone to carbon buildup, and car makers recommend fuels with higher detergent levels to combat the problem. At first GDI was mainly available in high-end autos, but it is now being used in mid-range cars and economy cars, such as the Hyundai Sonata, Ford Focus and Hyundai Accent.

In 2004 representatives of BMW, General Motors, Honda, and Toyota got together to specify what makes a good fuel. Using recommendations from the Worldwide Fuel Charter, a global committee of automakers and engine manufacturers, they established a proprietary standard for a class of gasoline called "Top Tier" Detergent Gasoline The new standard required increased levels of detergents, and restricted metallic content. Volkswagen and Audi joined the group of automakers in 2007. Gas brands can participate and get a Top Tier license if they meet certain standards, which includes performance tests for intake valve and combustion chamber deposits, fuel injector fouling, and intake valve sticking. Additive manufacturers pay for the testing, the cost of which varies from year to year, while gasoline companies pay an annual fee based on the number of stations it operates to participate in the program.

In addition to higher detergent levels, Top Tier standards also require that gasoline be free of metallic additives, which can be harmful to the emissions control systems in cars.

In October 2017 a Top Tier Diesel Fuel program was launched.

== Purpose of detergents in gasoline ==
Detergent additives serve to prevent the buildup of engine "gunk", which can cause a host of mechanical problems. Automotive journalist Craig Cole writes, "Gasoline is an impure substance refined from a very impure base stock—crude oil. It's an explosive hydrocarbon cocktail containing all kinds of different chemicals. In addition to its own molecular variability, refiners and retailers incorporate additional substances into the mix, from ethanol alcohol to octane enhancers."

While General Motors' fuels engineer Andrew Buczynsky claims that no one has identified the exact molecule in gasoline that causes engine buildup, he suggests using Top Tier Detergent Gasoline to keep one's engine cleaner. Engine gunk typically builds up in fuel injectors and on intake valves, and if severe can result in reduced fuel efficiency, acceleration, and power. Left unchecked, engine gunk can also contribute to increased emissions, rough idling, and tendency to stall, and can therefore increase required motor repairs. When fuel injectors accumulate deposits, they do not distribute fuel evenly, creating pockets of too much fuel and too little fuel. Too-little fuel around the spark plug dampens the combustion that drives the piston downward and may cause a misfire. When the frequency of misfires reaches a certain point, the on-board computer turns on the check engine light on the dash. The repair for this type of problem depends on the severity of the deposits. In milder cases, a mechanic may solve the problem by adding a can of fuel-injector cleaner into the gas tank. However, in some cases, the fuel injectors must be replaced. Deposits formed on the intake valves may be removed via walnut shell blasting. In severe cases, a more costly cylinder-head rebuild may be necessary.

Certain forms of sulfur that refiners or pipelines may leave in finished gasoline, such as mercaptans and hydrogen sulfide, can contaminate fuel sending units and lead to erratic dashboard fuel gauge readings, which may be expensive to repair. However, this problem has become less common since 2006, since manufacturers have been making these units with improved alloys that are less affected by these forms of sulfur.

Chris Martin at Honda states, "We've supported it [Top Tier gasoline] because we've seen a benefit from it for our consumers in the long run...We don't require that our vehicle owners use Top Tier gas [but it helps] make sure the engines are going to last as long as they could."

== Characteristics of Top Tier gasoline ==
To be certified as Top Tier, a gasoline must pass a series of performance tests that demonstrate specified levels of the following:

- Deposit control on intake valves
- Deposit control on fuel injectors
- Deposit control on combustion chambers
- Prevention of intake-valve sticking

Gasoline marketers agree when they sign on to Top Tier program that all their grades of gasoline meet these standards. However, premium grade gasoline may have yet higher levels of detergent additives. Typically, Top Tier gasoline will contain two to three times the amount of detergent additives currently required by the EPA. The extra additives are estimated to cost less than a cent per gallon.

In addition to the detergent additive requirement, Top Tier gasoline cannot contain metallic additives, because they can be harmful to a car's emissions-control system.

According to its auto industry research and to automotive journalists, all vehicles will benefit from using Top Tier Detergent Gasoline over gasoline meeting the basic EPA standard. New vehicles will supposedly benefit by keeping their engine clean and running optimally, while older vehicles may benefit with increased engine performance and prolonged vehicle life.

== Reception ==
A 2007 USA Today article quoted three critics who say Top Tier gasoline has little or no benefit, but the same article quoted three endorsers of the new standard. Tom Magliozzi, co-host of NPR's weekly radio show, Car Talk, said that using top tier detergent gasoline is only critical on high-end vehicles. For other vehicles, he and another source said that periodic use of a concentrated engine cleaner every 100,000 miles will "often" clean out carbon buildup. However, journalist and automotive mechanics instructor Jim Kerr says that with some brands of gasoline, deposits can build up on intake valves in less than 10,000 kilometres (6,200 mi). And General Motors fuels engineer Andrew Buczynsky says the various engine-cleaning additives available at auto-parts stores should be used with caution. He said some work but most do not, and that care must be taken when using these additives because some may contaminate the catalytic converter. Also, if too much is used, the additive may cling to valve stems and cause them to hang open.

Magliozzi's co-host, Ray Magliozzi, said that to be sure of preventing buildup of fuel injectors and valves, motorists should use Top Tier gasoline "at least most of the time." Automotive mechanics instructor Jim Kerr concured, "All gasoline is not created equal...Top Tier does have benefits."

== Availability ==
In 2004 the standard was adopted by ten gasoline distributors. Chevron and QuikTrip were first, followed that same year by 76 Stations, Conoco, Phillips 66, Road Ranger, Kwik Trip/Star, Shell, and MFA Oil Company. Since then, many more gasoline distributors have met the proprietary standard and Top Tier gasoline can now be found in gas stations all over the US and Canada. Kwik Trip/Star has since stopped meeting Top Tier fuel standards.

Top Tier is also available from select brands in Canada, El Salvador, Guatemala, Honduras, Mexico, Panama, and Puerto Rico. Meeting this standard allows gasoline marketers to differentiate themselves from their competition. All stations selling the brand must meet Top Tier standards before the brand is qualified. They must pass separate tests measuring the ability of their gasoline to keep intake valves, combustion chambers, fuel injectors clean, and to prevent intake valves from sticking.

== See also ==
- Gasoline
- List of gasoline additives
- Vehicle emissions control
