= Community Care College =

Community college in Tulsa, Oklahoma

Coordinates: 36.1017°N 95.9053°W

- Type: Private career college
- Established: 1995
- Founders: Teresa Knox
- President: Kimberly Sebastian
- Location: Tulsa, Oklahoma, United States
- Campus: Suburban
- Colours: Red, Green, Orange
- Website: www.communitycarecollege.edu
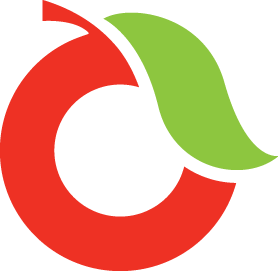

Community Care College is a private career college in Tulsa, Oklahoma. The college is the main campus of two branches, Clary Sage College and Oklahoma Technical College. Founded by entrepreneur and Tulsa Oklahoma native Teresa Knox in 1995 as Dental Directions: The School of Dental Assisting, the college eventually expanded its curriculum to other include career oriented programs. The colleges are licensed by the Oklahoma Board of Private Vocational Schools and accredited by the Accrediting Commission of Career Schools and Colleges.

== History ==
In 1995, Teresa Knox founded Dental Directions: The School of Dental Assisting. During its first year of business, Dental Directions graduated twelve students. In 1996, the college initiated application for accreditation with the Accrediting Bureau of Health Education Schools (ABHES). By mid-1998, more than 300 students had graduated from the Dental Assistant program. After this initial success, Dental Directions, Inc. began doing business under the name Community Care College (CCC) and ABHES accreditation was granted.

In 2003, the college moved to its current location at 4242 S. Sheridan Road after purchasing the building from QuikTrip. In 2004, CCC began offering Associate of Applied Science degrees, which was changed to an Associate of Occupational Science Business and Industry Management degree in 2017.

In December 2025, Community Care College, along with Oklahoma Technical College, both part of the Community Care College system, received a donation of US $16 million from philanthropist MacKenzie Scott. The gift was the largest single donation in the colleges' histories and was part of a series of major philanthropic gifts Scott directed to Oklahoma higher education institutions.

== Clary Sage College ==
Clary Sage College (CSC) is a cosmetology college based in Tulsa, Oklahoma. Clary Sage College was established by Teresa Knox in 2005 as a branch campus of Community Care College. The college grants the Associate of Occupational Science degree in several programs to students taking additional courses at the main campus, Community Care College.

The success of Community Care College led to a decision by Knox to expand the career-based college by creating a second campus. Clary Sage College was developed to provide an advanced education in the field of cosmetology, operating simultaneously as a cosmetology college and functioning spa so students could practice their skills and build clientele in a professional, real-world setting. In 2010, CSC expanded to include programs in Fashion and Interior Design. Summer of 2015, the college converted from for-profit to nonprofit status in order to expand educational opportunities to those that need it the most through increased scholarships and reduced tuition.

The school is accredited by the Accrediting Commission of Career Schools and Colleges (ACCSC) and licensed by the Oklahoma State Board of Cosmetology and the Oklahoma Board of Private Vocational Schools.

=== Campus ===
In 2006, construction began on the current campus at 3131 S Sheridan Road. The property sits on six acres and is one of the largest schools of its kind in the United States. The first floor was designed to resemble an upscale spa and includes a salon floor, barber shop, massage and esthetician clinics, pedicure and manicuring rooms, and a dispensary, all of which are used for the "hands-on" components of the curriculum of each program. The second floor hosts classrooms, computer lab and library.

In 2006, it began its expansion into a multi-campus college, starting with the establishment and construction of Clary Sage College. CSC was developed to provide an advanced education in the field of cosmetology, operating simultaneously as a cosmetology college and functioning spa so students could practice their skills in a professional setting. In 2010 the college expanded to include programs in Fashion and Interior Design.

== Oklahoma Technical College ==
The success of Clary Sage College led to a decision to establish Oklahoma Technical College (OTC), offering programs in Automotive Technology, AOS Diesel Technology, Diesel Technology, Electrical Technology, Welding, and Heating, Ventilation, Air Conditioning (HVAC) and Refrigeration. OTC opened in 2009.

The colleges operated under a for-profit corporation for 20 years but in 2015 the colleges became non-profit when their assets were acquired by a newly formed 501(c)(3) public charity, Community HigherEd.

== Programs and accreditation ==
Accrediting Body	Program
Accrediting Commission of Career Schools and Colleges (ACCSC)	AOS Accounting, Bookkeeping, AOS Business and Industry Management, Dental Assistant, Early Childhood Education, AOS Health Care Administration, Health Care Administration, Medical Assistant, AOS Medical Billing and Coding, Medical Billing and Coding, AOS Paralegal Studies, Paralegal Studies, AOS Surgical Technologist and Veterinary Assistant.
Accrediting Bureau of Health Education Schools (ABHES)	Medical Assistant (Residential)
Commission on Accreditation of Allied Health Education Programs (CAAHEP)	AOS Surgical Technologist

== Campus ==
In 2003, Community Care College moved its campus to the current location at 4242 S Sheridan Rd Tulsa, OK. This building was previously known as the QuikTrip building.
