= The Church Studio =

Historic church and recording studio in Tulsa, Oklahoma, United States

- U.S. National Register of Historic Places
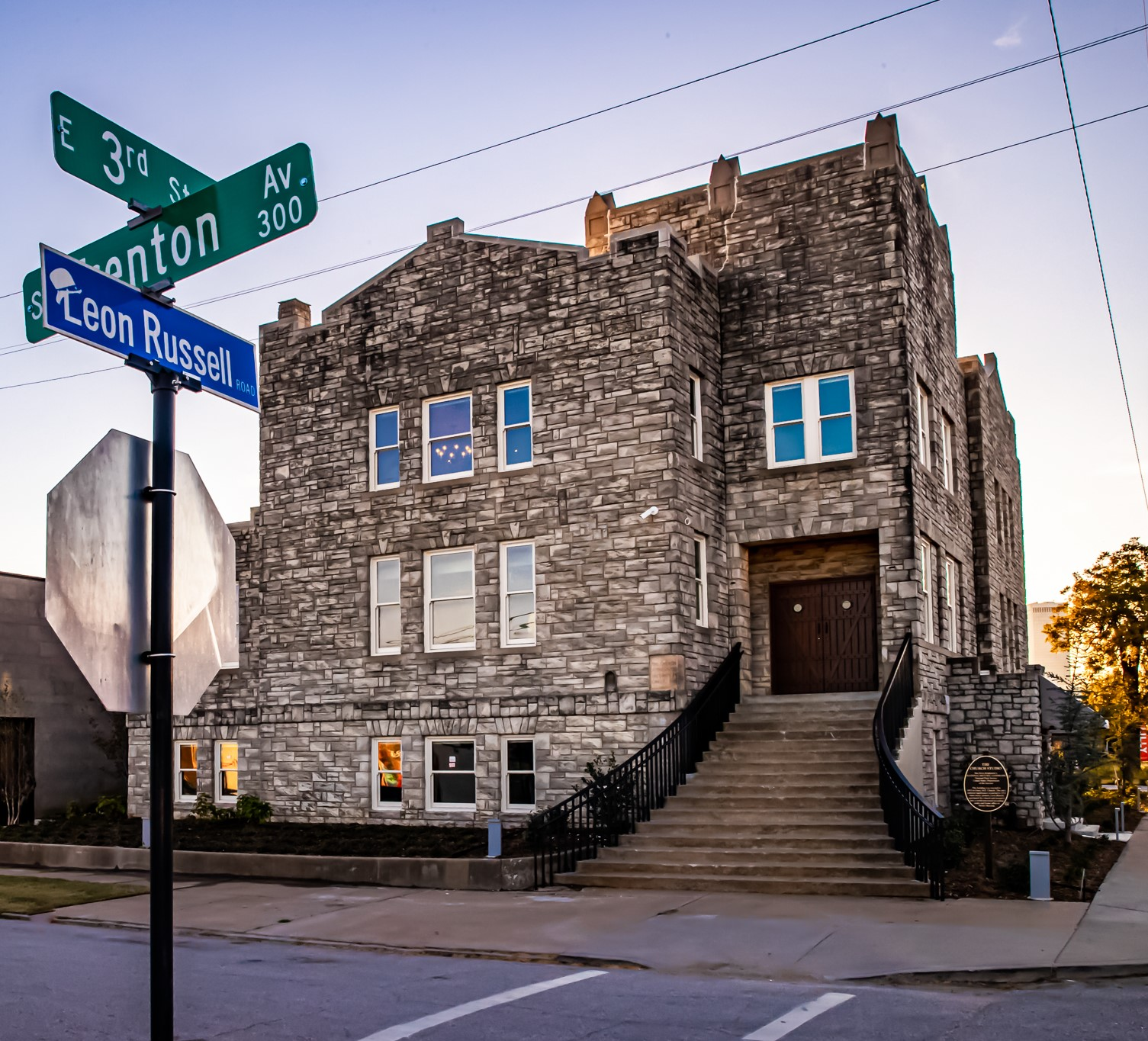
- The Church Studio
- Location: 304 S. Trenton Ave., Tulsa, Oklahoma
- Coordinates: 36°9′21″N 95°58′11″W
- Architect: Chris Lilly (renovation)
- Architectural style: Gothic Revival
- Website: The Church Studio
- NRHP reference No.: 100001595
- Added to NRHP: 8 September 2017

The Church Studio is a recording studio in the Pearl District of Tulsa, Oklahoma established in 1972 by musician, songwriter, and producer Leon Russell. Located in a converted church building, the studio has since been cited as being the heart of the Tulsa Sound.

== History ==
Originally built in 1915 as Grace Methodist Episcopal Church, the stone structure located at 304 South Trenton Avenue in Tulsa's Pearl District was converted to a recording studio in 1972 by Leon Russell, who bought the building and adjoining properties for his diverse recording activities and as a home for Shelter Records, the company he had previously started with partner Denny Cordell. Russell eventually sold the building. Tulsa musician Steve Ripley, leader of The Tractors and partners bought it in 1987 and retained ownership until 2006.

Numerous musicians recorded at The Church Studio during Russell's ownership, including Kansas (band), Willie Nelson, Stevie Wonder, Michael Bolton, Eric Clapton, Bonnie Raitt, Dwight Twilley, Dr. John, Charlie Wilson, Jimmy Buffett, Willis Alan Ramsey, JJ Cale, The Gap Band, Freddie King, Phoebe Snow and Peter Tosh. Mike Campbell (musician) and Tom Petty, with their early band Mudcrutch and later Tom Petty and the Heartbreakers, signed their first record deal with Shelter Records. The studio's equipment includes a vast collection of vintage microphones, tape machines, Fairchild 660 and NEVE 8068 mixing console purchased from Daniel Lanois that is pictured on the album cover of the Bob Dylan album Time Out of Mind. Other notable equipment pieces includes Dan Fogelberg's Yamaha C-7 grand piano and the Sakae drum kit of Jamie Oldaker, drummer of Eric Clapton.

Leon Russell was inducted into the Rock & Roll Hall of Fame and Songwriters Hall of Fame in 2011, and the Oklahoma Music Hall of Fame in 2006. Following Russell's death in 2016, flowers, paintings, memorabilia, and notes left by fans covered the church steps as a memorial.

== Restoration and reopening ==
In 2009, new owners Jakob and Randy Miller declared their intention to revive The Church Studio as a music facility. The following year, the Pearl District Association and the city of Tulsa collaborated to rename the section of East Third Street where the church is located as "Leon Russell Road."

In 2016 the building was purchased by Tulsa entrepreneur Teresa Knox and her husband Ivan Acosta, who expressed their intention to renovate the building (a process that was expected to take two years but took over five years), seek registration on the National Register of Historic Places, and use it as a recording studio and community facility.

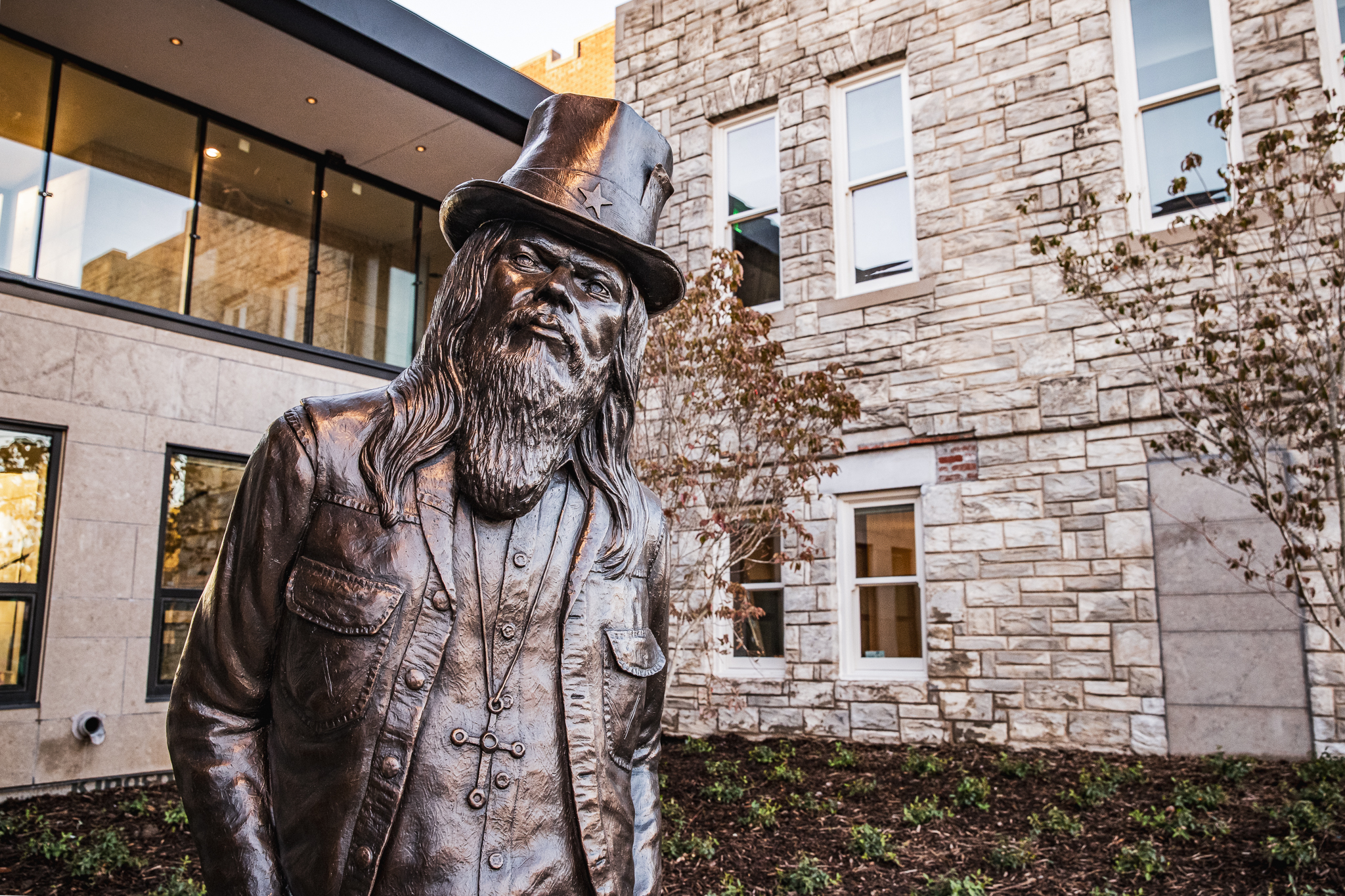
Leon Russell bronze statue located in front of The Church Studio.

In 2022, after over five years of renovation, The Church Studio reopened to the public on March 1, 2022, the 50th anniversary of Leon Russell's purchase of the building. The facility serves as a tourist attraction and includes a recording studio, concert and event venue, home of The Church Studio Archive, and audio engineering school. A series of highly curated concert events included performances by Bill Champlin and Kenny Loggins. Various musicians and bands have visited or recorded at the historic recording studio, which offers both analog and digital recording techniques, including Joe Bonamassa, 38 Special, Air Supply, Tommy Emmanuel, Lainey Wilson, Nick Mason, Bill Ward (musician), Lukas Nelson & Promise of the Real, George Thorogood Asleep at the Wheel, Marc Ribot, Kristin Chenoweth, Cory Henry The Oak Ridge Boys, The All-American Rejects, T Bone Burnett, Wes Studi, Gary Busey, Turnpike Troubadours, Rosanne Cash, The Mountain Goats, Elle King, and Ray Wylie Hubbard. In 2022, Dropkick Murphys recorded their album, This Machine Still Kills Fascists, at the studio. The lyrics on the album are written by Oklahoma native Woody Guthrie. Taj Mahal co-produced and recorded Swingin' Live at the Church in Tulsa and received a Grammy for Best Traditional Blues Album in 2024.

A life-sized bronze statue of Leon Russell as he appeared in 1972 when he purchased the church, including his Wrangler denim jacket, snake-skinned boots, cross necklace, and signature top hat, stands at the new entrance of The Church Studio. The statue, which took three years to complete, was created by artist Jim Franklin of Perry, Oklahoma, was commissioned by Teresa Knox, who also owns the copyright.

The building was listed on the National Register of Historic Places in 2017 due to its significance to American music culture and being the heart of the Tulsa Sound.

Grammy Awards lists the Church Studio a top 10 studio that takes fans behind the scenes.
