= In the First Place =

Single by the Remo Four
- Released: January 1999
- Recorded: January 1968
- Studio: Abbey Road Studios, London
- Genre: Psychedelic pop
- Length: 3:16
- Label: Pilar
- Songwriters: Colin Manley, Tony Ashton
- Producer: George Harrison

"In the First Place" is a song by the English rock group the Remo Four. It was released as a single in January 1999 to accompany the re-release of the 1968 psychedelic film Wonderwall, directed by Joe Massot. The song was written by Colin Manley and Tony Ashton of the Remo Four and recorded in London in January 1968 during the sessions for George Harrison's Wonderwall Music soundtrack album. Having produced the track for the band, Harrison unearthed the recording 30 years later when supplying Massot with the master tapes for the film's music. Ashton and the Remo Four's drummer, Roy Dyke, also recorded the song with their subsequent group, Ashton, Gardner and Dyke, in 1969.

A psychedelic pop song, "In the First Place" has been likened by some commentators to Harrison's 1967 Beatles track "Blue Jay Way". Massot sequenced the rediscovered recording as the opening track in his 1999 director's cut of Wonderwall. Backed by a new mix of the song, carried out by Paul Hicks, the single was issued to help pay for the cancer treatment being undergone by Manley, who died three months after its release. In 2014, the Remo Four version was included as a bonus track on the Apple Years reissue of Wonderwall Music.

== Background ==
Led by guitarist Colin Manley, the Remo Four were contemporaries of the Beatles in Liverpool's Merseybeat scene of the early 1960s. They then toured as a support act to the Beatles in 1964 but, despite being managed by Brian Epstein, the group failed to achieve commercial success and were without a recording contract by 1966. Late the following year, they reunited with George Harrison, who was starting his first musical project outside the Beatles – writing and recording the instrumental film score for director Joe Massot's psychedelic film Wonderwall. Since the band were in need of work and he required backing musicians for the non-Indian portions of the film soundtrack, Harrison offered the job to the Remo Four. The group's first session for Wonderwall took place on 22 December 1967 at EMI Studios (now Abbey Road Studios) in London.

== Recording ==
"In the First Place" was written by Manley and Tony Ashton, the Remo Four's keyboard player. The song was relatively unusual for the band, in that they were best known as a non-vocal group and had recently developed a soul-jazz sound in their live act. The song is in the psychedelic style typical of the era and recalls Harrison's "Blue Jay Way" in its combination of Indian and psychedelic influences. According to drummer Roy Dyke, the Indian influence was in keeping with the atmosphere during the sessions and the prevailing trend in London.

Although the 1999 single artwork lists 1967 as the year of recording, Beatles recording historian Matt Hurwitz identifies the date as 22 January 1968. Ashton was the vocalist on the track, which Harrison produced and also played guitar and sang on. (Note: According to author John Winn, Harrison most likely played acoustic guitar since he can be heard delivering the spoken count-in on the unedited recording.) Five takes of the song were taped that day at Abbey Road, with Ken Scott as the recording engineer.

Having adopted an approach whereby he created pieces of a certain mood and length, as determined by the film, Harrison did not include "In the First Place" in the soundtrack. According to author Alan Clayson, the song was unlikely to have been considered as a possible release by the Remo Four, had they been able to secure a recording contract, given that it was such a departure from their usual style. The group disbanded later in 1968 and then, without Manley, formed the trio Ashton, Gardner and Dyke. This band recorded the track – now titled "As It Was in the First Place" and with Ashton credited as the sole writer – for their 1969 album Ashton, Gardner and Dyke. The album received little attention, although the trio went on to enjoy chart success with their 1971 single "The Resurrection Shuffle". (Note: Harrison played guitar on the B-side to the 1971 single, "I'm Your Spiritual Breadman", in gratitude to Ashton for playing on his 1970 song "Isn't It a Pity".)

== Rediscovery ==
After its limited showings over 1968–69, Wonderwall earned a reputation as a lost film from London's psychedelic era and was remembered mainly for Harrison's Wonderwall Music soundtrack album. Among the influences Oasis adopted from the Beatles, Noel Gallagher titled their 1995 song "Wonderwall" after the album. The widespread popularity of Oasis' song encouraged Massot to revisit Wonderwall in November 1997 and prepare a director's cut of the film for general release. Harrison assisted in retrieving the master tapes of the musical soundtrack, so that the film's music could be presented in stereo for the first time, during which he discovered a reel containing the Remo Four's "In the First Place". In his notes to the engineers restoring the film's audio, Harrison was unable to remember who wrote the song and speculated that it had been used as "maybe a filler somewhere" in the original film.

The recording was remixed by Paul Hicks at Abbey Road Studios for inclusion in the new cut of Wonderwall. Massot used the song over the opening credits, replacing Harrison's Indian piece "Microbes".

== Release ==
"In the First Place" was issued as a CD single in January 1999 on the Pilar record label. Harrison was keen to see the Remo Four fully credited for the song, particularly as Manley was in poor health, and eschewed any acknowledgement of his own contribution other than as a producer. The A-side used the mix created at Abbey Road in 1968, while the B-side contained the new, shorter "movie mix". The release was marketed as "the single from Wonderwall". Proceeds from the single helped pay for Manley's cancer treatment. He died in April 1999, two months before Wonderwall finally received its first public screening in the United States, as part of a 1960s film festival in Hollywood.

The single, in both CD and vinyl formats, was also available as part of a limited-edition box set that compiled the DVD of the film with collectibles related to the production. In 2014, as part of the Apple Years 1968–75 reissues of his father's solo albums, Dhani Harrison included "In the First Place" as a bonus track on the remastered Wonderwall Music CD.

== Critical reception ==
Writing for Mojo in 2014, Mat Snow called "In the First Place" "amazing" and "a lysergic extra lap of the Magical Mystery Tour", referring to the Beatles' 1967 television film in which "Blue Jay Way" appeared. Richie Unterberger of AllMusic considers the song to be "decent minor-key psychedelic pop with prominent piano and heavy phasing effects", while New Zealand Herald critic Graham Reid describes it as "very Blue Jay Way".

Author Robert Rodriguez views "In the First Place" as both "a creature of its time and timeless", adding that its mood and atmosphere make the track "very much in the mold of 'Blue Jay Way'". In his article on the story behind "In the First Place", Martin Lewis also comments on the similarities with Harrison's 1967 song, and he describes the Remo Four track as "an extremely strong piece of psychedelic pop" that "perfectly matched the movie's mood".

== Sources ==
- Andy Bennett & Jon Stratton (eds), Britpop and the English Music Tradition (rev. edn), Ashgate Publishing (Farnham, UK, 2013; ISBN 978-1-4094-9407-2).
- Alan Clayson, George Harrison, Sanctuary (London, 2003; ISBN 1-86074-489-3).
- Bill Harry, The George Harrison Encyclopedia, Virgin Books (London, 2003; ISBN 978-0-7535-0822-0).
- Kevin Howlett, "Wonderwall Music" (liner note essay), Wonderwall Music CD booklet (Apple Records, 2014; produced by George Harrison).
- Simon Leng, While My Guitar Gently Weeps: The Music of George Harrison, Hal Leonard (Milwaukee, WI, 2006; ISBN 1-4234-0609-5).
- Chip Madinger & Mark Easter, Eight Arms to Hold You: The Solo Beatles Compendium, 44.1 Productions (Chesterfield, MO, 2000; ISBN 0-615-11724-4).
- Barry Miles, The Beatles Diary Volume 1: The Beatles Years, Omnibus Press (London, 2001; ISBN 0-7119-8308-9).
- Stuart Shea & Robert Rodriguez, Fab Four FAQ: Everything Left to Know About the Beatles ... and More!, Hal Leonard (New York, NY, 2007; ISBN 978-1-4234-2138-2).
- Gary Tillery, Working Class Mystic: A Spiritual Biography of George Harrison, Quest Books (Wheaton, IL, 2011; ISBN 978-0-8356-0900-5).
- John C. Winn, That Magic Feeling: The Beatles' Recorded Legacy, Volume Two, 1966–1970, Three Rivers Press (New York, NY, 2009; ISBN 978-0-307-45239-9).
