= First of the Big Bands =

Studio album by Tony Ashton and Jon Lord
- Released: April 1974
- Recorded: November 17, 1971 – late 1973
- Studio: Air Studios and Apple Studios, London, England
- Genre: Rock
- Label: Purple (UK); Warner Bros. (US); Line (1983 German reissue)
- Producer: Tony Ashton; Jon Lord

Tony Ashton chronology
It's Only a Movie (1973)	First of the Big Bands (1974)	Malice in Wonderland (1977)

Jon Lord chronology
Gemini Suite (1972)	First of the Big Bands (1974)	Windows (1974)

First of the Big Bands is a studio album by Tony Ashton of Ashton, Gardner and Dyke and Jon Lord of Deep Purple, released in April 1974 by Purple Records in the UK and Europe and Warner Bros. Records in the US. The project was Ashton's and Lord's brainchild and continuation of their working relationship after Ashton Gardner & Dyke helped out on Jon Lord's soundtrack album The Last Rebel from 1971. Stylistically, First of the Big Bands was the precursor to Paice Ashton Lord's Malice in Wonderland album from 1977. Most of the album was recorded at Air and Apple Studios, London, with additional work being completed at De Lane Lea and Island.

First of the Big Bands resulted in just two live performances, one of which was for the BBC. This was issued in 1993 as First of the Big Bands - BBC Live in Concert 1974.

In November 2010 a remastered edition of the album was released by Purple Records. It contains two bonus tracks – the single B-side "Sloeback" and an alternative version of "Down Side Upside Down".

== Track listing ==
All tracks are written by Tony Ashton and Jon Lord, except where noted

No.	Title	Writer(s)	Recording Date and Studio	Length
1.	"We're Gonna Make It"		November 17th 1971, Apple Studios	3.52
2.	"Downside Upside Down"		October 31st 1972, De Lane Lea; March 1973, Island	4.01
3.	"Band of the Salvation Army Band" (incl. Bringing In the Sheaves)		Autumn 1973, Air Studios	3.55
4.	"Silly Boy"		August 29th 1973, Air Studios	3.23
5.	"Surrender Me"	Ashton	1972	3.55
6.	"Celebration"		November 18th 1971, Air Studios	4:27
7.	"I Been Lonely"	Ashton		3.52
8.	"Shut Up"		November 1972, De Lane Lea	3.55
9.	"Ballad of Mr. Giver" (Featuring a reprise of "Celebration")		November 1972, De Lane Lea; March 1973, Island	6.09

Professional ratings
Review scores
Source	Rating
Allmusic	4.5/5 stars

== Personnel ==
=== Personnel ===
- Tony Ashton - Lead vocals, Hammond organ, piano
- Jon Lord - Hammond organ, piano
- Mick Clarke - guitars
- Jim Cregan - guitars
- Jerry Donahue - guitars
- Peter Frampton - guitars
- Pat Donaldson - bass
- Dave Caswell - trumpet
- Mike Davis - trumpet
- John Mumford - trombone
- Dick Parry - saxophone
- Howie Casey - saxophone
- Carmine Appice - drums
- Terry Cox - drums
- Ian Paice - drums
- Cozy Powell - drums
- Frank Ricotti - percussion, vibraphone
- Madeline Bell - backing vocals
- Tony Ferguson - backing vocals
- Jimmy Helms - backing vocals
- Kenny Rowe - backing vocals
- Graham White - backing vocals
- Jo Ann Williams - backing vocals
- Roger Willis - backing vocals

=== Technical ===
- Engineered by Martin Birch, Geoffrey Emerick, Alan Harris, John Middleton, John Mills and Bill Price
- Produced by Tony Ashton and Jon Lord
- John Kosh - cover design
- Peter Howe - photography
