= The Remo Four =

English rock band (1959–1970)

- Remo Four publicity photograph, circa 1964

Background information
- Origin: Liverpool, England
- Genres: Beat, rock and roll
- Years active: 1959–1970
- Labels: Pye, Piccadilly, Star-Club
- Past members: Colin Manley; Don Andrew; Keith Stokes; Harry Prytherch; Roy Dyke; Phil Rogers; Tony Ashton

The Remo Four were a 1950s–1960s rock band from Liverpool, England. They were contemporaries of The Beatles, and later had the same manager, Brian Epstein. Its members were Colin Manley (born Colin William Manley, 16 April 1942, in Old Swan, Liverpool, Lancashire; died 9 April 1999) (lead guitar/vocals), Phil Rogers (rhythm guitar/bass guitar/vocals) (born Philip Rogers, 5 March 1942, in Liverpool; died 14 January 2020), Don Andrew (born Donald M. Andrew, 14 July 1942, in Liverpool) (bass guitar/vocals), Keith Stokes (vocals/guitar) and Roy Dyke (drums) (born 13 February 1945, in Liverpool). Andrew and Manley were in the same class at school (Liverpool Institute for Boys) as Paul McCartney.

== Career ==
Colin Manley and Don Andrew formed the Remo Quartet in 1958, with singer/guitarist Keith Stokes (born in 1942 died 19 June 2010) and drummer Harry Prytherch (born 4 August 1941, Liverpool; died 13 October 2015). They progressed from playing local parties and contests to regular hall appearances, and turned professional, changing their name to the Remo Four in mid-1959. They played a mix of vocal harmony material and instrumental numbers in the manner of the Everly Brothers, the Shadows, the Ventures, and Chet Atkins.

The Remo Four were voted No. 3 Group in a 1961 Mersey Beat poll, and among their fans were the Beatles, fresh from a season in Hamburg, Germany. Both groups were among the regulars at the Cavern Club during 1961 and 1962, and both shared the bill with Gerry & The Pacemakers, Rory Storm and the Hurricanes, and Ted "Kingsize" Taylor and the Dominoes, at the 1961 "Operation Big Beat", a festival at New Brighton's Tower Ballroom. While the Beatles travelled back and forth to Hamburg, the Remo Four began playing U.S. Air Force bases in France, building their stage and musical experience. Johnny Sandon joined the band as vocalist in 1962, and stayed for two years.

Johnny Sandon & The Remo Four publicity photo, circa 1963

In early 1963, Prytherch left the band to marry and find a regular job, and was replaced by Roy Dyke. Stokes also left and was replaced by Phil Rogers. That year the band signed up with Brian Epstein's NEMS Enterprises and acquired a new lead singer, Tommy Quickly, and a recording contract with Piccadilly Records, backing Quickly on Lennon and McCartney's "Tip of My Tongue" and other songs. The band also released instrumentals, including a rendition of Henry Mancini's "Peter Gunn".

In a significant line-up change, Tony Ashton (keyboards/vocals) replaced Don Andrew, with Rogers moving to bass. Another NEMS artist, Billy J. Kramer, became a frontman for the band, which adopted the name "The New Dakotas" while backing him. Despite their talent and track record, the band's success in the record market was limited, and most of their work came as backing musicians, or as the house band in German clubs, including the Star-Club in Hamburg. They released an album, Smile!, on the Star-Club's own label in 1967, featuring elements of rock and jazz.

Late in 1967, George Harrison hired the Remo Four as his backing band for part of his first solo project, the soundtrack album to the movie Wonderwall. While the songs were mostly instrumentals, they did record one lyrical song, "In the First Place", with Harrison, which was left unreleased until the 1990s. (Note: Ashton, Gardner and Dyke reworked the song and recorded it as "As It Was in the First Place" in 1979) In the late 1960s, the band became Billy Fury's backing band.

Disbanding in 1970, Ashton and Dyke joined guitarist Kim Gardner, formerly of the Creation and the Birds (Note: not to be confused with the Byrds), to form Ashton, Gardner & Dyke, who later recorded a song called "Ballad of the Remo Four". Ashton later formed Paice Ashton Lord with Ian Paice and Jon Lord of Deep Purple. Manley became an accompanist for singers including Engelbert Humperdinck, and later joined the Swinging Blue Jeans. Andrew and Manley appeared with Gerry Marsden performing on stage in an episode of the UK soap opera Brookside in the 1990s. Manley died of cancer on 9 April 1999, and a memorial concert was held for him that June, with some of his former bandmates performing. Ashton also died of cancer, on 28 May 2001. Stokes died on 19 June 2010. Rogers died on 14 January 2020 in Buckinghamshire.

== Discography ==
Singles

- "Lies"/"On the Horizon" (with Johnny Sandon) (7 inch single; Pye 7N 15542; July 1963)
- "Magic Potion"/"Yes" (with Johnny Sandon) (7 inch single; Pye 7N 15559; July/August 1963)
- "Tip of My Tongue"/"Heaven Only Knows" (with Tommy Quickly) (7 inch single; Piccadilly 7N 35137; August 1963)
- "Kiss Me Now"/"No Other Love" (with Tommy Quickly) (7 inch single; Piccadilly 7N 35151; 1963)
- "Prove It"/"Haven't You Noticed" (with Tommy Quickly) (7 inch single; Piccadilly 7N 35167; 1964)
- "I Wish I Could Shimmy Like My Sister Kate"/"Peter Gunn" (7 inch single; Piccadilly 7N 35175 (1964)
- "You Might as Well Forget Him"/"It's as Simple as That" (with Tommy Quickly) (7 inch single; Piccadilly 7N 35183; 1964)
- "Sally Go Round the Roses"/"I Know a Girl" (7 inch single; Piccadilly 7N 35186; 1964)
- "Everybody knows"/"Closer to me" (with Gregory Phillips) (7 inch single; Pye 7N 15593; 1964)
- "Wild Side of Life"/"Forget the Other Guy" (with Tommy Quickly) (7 inch single; Pye 7N 15708; October 1964)
- "Humpty Dumpty"/"I'll Go Crazy" (with Tommy Quickly) (7 inch single; Pye 7N 15748; 1964)
- "Live Like a Lady"/"Sing Halleluja" (7inch single; Fontana TF 787; 1966)
- In the First Place (original Wonderwall Abbey Road mix)/ In the First Place (Wonderwall movie mix) (7 inch single; Pilar PILAR02V; 1998)
- In The First Place (CD single; Pilar PILAR01CD; 2000)
1. In The First Place (original Wonderwall Abbey Road mix)
2. In The First Place (Wonderwall movie mix)

Compilation albums

- Smile! (Star-Club 148 577; issued in Germany, 1967)
1. Heart Beat
2. Skate
3. No Money Down
4. Rock Candy
5. 7th Son
6. Roadrunner
7. Brother Where Are You
8. Jive Samba
9. Nothin's Too Good For My Baby
- The Best of Tommy Quickly, Johnny Sandon, Gregory Phillips and the Remo Four (CD album; See For Miles Records SEECD349; 1992)
1. Kiss Me Now
2. Tip Of My Tongue
3. Prove It
4. You Might As Well Forget Him
5. The Wild Side Of Life
6. Heaven Only Knows
7. No Other Love
8. Haven't You Noticed
9. It's As Simple As That
10. Forget The Other Guy
11. Humpty Dumpty
12. I Go Crazy
13. Lies
14. Yes
15. (I'd Be) A Legend In My Time
16. Sixteen Tons
17. Donna Means Heartbreak
18. On The Horizon
19. Magic Potion
20. Some Kinda Wonderful
21. Everybody Knows
22. Angie
23. Don't Bother Me
24. Closer To Me
25. Please Believe Me
26. Make Sure That You're Mine
27. I Wish I Could Shimmy Like My Sister Kate
28. Sally Go Round The Roses
29. I Know A Girl
30. Peter Gunn

(Tracks 1-12 feature Tommy Quickly, 13-20 feature Johnny Sandon, and 21-26 feature Gregory Phillips.)

- Smile! (CD album; Repertoire RR7034; issued in Germany, 21 November 1996) (Reissued by Bear Family Records – BCD 17105 AH; 2010)
1. Heart Beat
2. Skate
3. No Money Down
4. Rock Candy
5. 7th Son
6. Roadrunner
7. Brother Where Are You
8. Jive Samba
9. Nothin's Too Good For My Baby
10. Peter Gunn
11. Mickey's Monkey
12. Live Like A Lady
13. Sing Hallelujah
14. Dancing And Singing
15. Sing Hallelujah Alternate Take
16. Live Like A Lady Alternate Take
17. Live Like A Lady Instrumental Version

- Beat-Club - The Best of '66 (video DVD; Studio-Hamburg/Radio Bremen (Various Artists, issued in Germany, 2000) includes the following Remo Four performances recorded in 1966:
1. Peter Gunn
2. Super Girl (with Graham Bonney)
- Fab Gear! Beat Beat Beat Vol.1 (The Mersey Sound And Other Mop Top Rarities 1962-1963) (double CD album; Castle Music; Various Artists, 2001) includes the following Remo Four tracks:
1. Lies*
2. On the Horizon*
3. Yes*
4. Magic Potion*
5. Kiss Me Now**
6. No Other Love (Could Ever Be The Same)**

*with Johnny Sandon; ** with Tommy Quickly

- In My Liverpool Home Volume 2 - Merseybeat Mania! (CD album; Mastersound MSCD529; 2003) includes the following Remo Four tracks:
1. Perfidia (recorded live, 1961) - as the Remo Quartet
2. Sleepwalk (recorded live, 1962)
- Unearthed Merseybeat (CD album; Viper CD016; Various Artists; 2003) includes the following Remo Four tracks:
1. Trambone (recorded 1961)
2. Walk Don't Run (recorded 1961)
- The Remo Four - 40 Years of Music (CD album; Mastersound MSCD581; 2005)
1. Peter Gunn (recorded 1964)
2. I Know A Girl (recorded 1964)
3. Yes* (recorded 1963)
4. Lies* (recorded 1963)
5. The Wild Side of Life** (recorded 1964)
6. Intro to "Tribute For Colin" (1 June 1999) by Billy Butler
7. Walk Don't Run / Perfida by Dave Williams ("Tribute For Colin", 1999)
8. Heartbeat by Paul Andrew (son of Don Andrew) ("Tribute For Colin", 1999)
9. Intro 2 by Don Andrew ("Tribute For Colin", 1999)
10. Runaway by Mike Byrne ("Tribute For Colin", 1999)
11. Intro 3 ("Tribute For Colin", 1999)
12. Rainy Days Come Often (composed by C Manley) by Paul Andrew ("Tribute For Colin", 1999)
13. Intro 4 ("Tribute For Colin", 1999)
14. Sleepwalk by Dave Williams ("Tribute For Colin", 1999)
15. End applause ("Tribute For Colin", 1999)
16. Sleepwalk (by original lineup, recorded 1992)
17. Perfidia (recorded at The Iron Door, 1961)
18. Walk, Don't Run (recorded at The Iron Door, 1961)
19. Trambone (recorded at The Iron Door, 1961)
20. The Stranger (recorded at The Iron Door, 1961)

*with Johnny Sandon; ** with Tommy Quickly

- Beatschuppen - Essential Club Music From The 60s (virtual album)
- Music Torrent (Various Artists, 2005) includes the following Remo Four track:
1. Heart Beat (recorded at Atomic Cafe, Munich, date unknown)
