= Dream Scene (song) =

Song by George Harrison

from the album Wonderwall Music
- Published: Northern Songs
- Released: 1 November 1968
- Genre: Experimental, sound collage, psychedelia
- Length: 5:27
- Label: Apple
- Songwriter: George Harrison
- Producer: George Harrison

"Dream Scene" is an experimental composition by English rock musician George Harrison. It was released in November 1968 on his debut solo album, Wonderwall Music, which was the soundtrack to the psychedelic film Wonderwall, directed by Joe Massot. The track is an instrumental piece, apart from occasional non-English language vocals and a spoken word segment. It comprises three sections and combines meditative Indian sounds and singing with passages of Western instrumentation and avant-garde styling, including backwards tape loops and sound effects. After viewing an early edit of Wonderwall at Twickenham Film Studios, Harrison devised the piece to accompany a psychedelic dream sequence in the film. The song serves as the narrative for the sequence, in which a strait-laced professor imagines himself duelling with the fashion photographer boyfriend of the young woman he obsessively spies on through a hole in the wall separating their apartments.

Harrison edited "Dream Scene" together from recordings made at different stages of the recording process for Wonderwall Music. He began recording the "Swordfencing" segment in November 1967, following his work on the Beatles' Magical Mystery Tour film project, and completed the piece during final mixing for the Wonderwall soundtrack, in February 1968. The recording sessions took place in London and the Indian city of Bombay. English classical musician John Barham was one of the contributors in London, and played piano and flugelhorn on the track. The song has been recognised by several reviewers as a sonically adventurous work. Some of these writers highlight "Dream Scene" as a forerunner to John Lennon and Yoko Ono's "Revolution 9" – a more widely known sound collage piece, to which Harrison also contributed, that was released on the Beatles' White Album.

== Background and inspiration ==
George Harrison was offered the film score project for Wonderwall by the film's director, Joe Massot, in October 1967. Given his status as a junior songwriter in the Beatles to John Lennon and Paul McCartney, the project afforded Harrison his first opportunity to compose extensively for a single project. He accepted the assignment on the understanding that he had a free rein to create whatever music he wanted.

The lack of dialogue in Massot's film ensured that its soundtrack played an important role in the narrative. The story concerns an ageing scientist's voyeuristic interest in the glamorous life of his next-door neighbour, a fashion model. In the context of 1960s Swinging London, the contrast between their existences, on either side of a connecting wall, symbolised the division between traditional norms and the younger generation's progressive thinking.

Harrison viewed a rough edit of the film several times at Twickenham Film Studios to determine the type of music required for each scene. Using his notes from these screenings, which included precise timings for each segment, he then composed the musical pieces. Typically of many of the selections in Wonderwall, the title of "Dream Scene" conveys its place in the story. The track appears in the film's first, extended dream sequence and was originally titled "Dream Sequence". The scene consists of an imaginary duel between the scientist and the model's boyfriend, a fashion photographer. During the duel, their weapons change from swords to various giant-sized items, including a pen, an electric drill, a cigarette and a lipstick holder.

== Recording ==
"Dream Scene" is a composite of recorded segments using Western and Indian sounds that Harrison edited together. (Note: Harrison approached the Wonderwall soundtrack partly as a means to promote Indian classical music, further to his adoption of the genre into his work with the Beatles over 1966–67.) He began recording "Swordfencing" – a short piece that formed part of "Dream Scene" – on 22 November 1967. Following the completion of his work on the Beatles' Magical Mystery Tour, this session marked the start of recording for the Wonderwall soundtrack and took place at EMI Studios (now Abbey Road Studios) in London. Using a tabla player and flautists Richard Adeney and Jack Ellory, Harrison taped four takes of "Swordfencing", in addition to working on pieces titled "India", "Backwards Tabla" and "Backwards Tones". The following day, he recorded a further twelve takes, with a line-up comprising two oboe players, a trumpeter and two flautists. John Barham, who contributed to much of the Western music used in the soundtrack, wrote the arrangement for flutes, oboes and trumpet.

Barham also played piano and flugelhorn on "Dream Scene". Tommy Reilly played chromatic harmonica, having originally been invited to contribute to the country-and-western piece "Cowboy Music". In author Simon Leng's description, the London recordings for Wonderwall engendered a spirit of improvisation and spontaneity among Harrison's fellow musicians, which "let the music 'create itself'" from his ideas. Among the participants were avant-garde designers the Fool – Simon Posthuma, Marijke Koger and Josje Leeger – who had created the psychedelic-themed sets for Massot's film. According to musicologist Walter Everett, the Fool played woodwind instruments on "Dream Scene".

Other sounds and instrumentation on the Western portions of the track include drums, electric guitar, sound effects, backwards tape loops, and Mellotron. The Eastern sounds include hand drums, sitar and singing, the last of which Harrison sourced from a recording in EMI's tape library at Abbey Road. While author Bruce Spizer writes that the Indian musicians may well have included Aashish Khan and percussionist Mahapurush Misra, both of whom contributed to the Wonderwall soundtrack in London in December 1967, Harrison recorded most of the Indian music for the film in Bombay. The latter sessions took place at His Master's Voice's studios between 9 and 13 January 1968.

Harrison completed the soundtrack in London over the remainder of January, after which he and Ken Scott mixed the recordings. During this last process, Harrison edited "Swordfencing" into the piece on 11 February and overdubbed further sound effects. At 5:27 in length, "Dream Scene" was the longest selection included on the album that Harrison culled from the film's music soundtrack, Wonderwall Music.

== Structure and content ==
Aside from "Ski-ing", "Dream Scene" is the only selection on Wonderwall Music in which the Indian and Western musical styles are combined. The song consists of three distinct parts. The first is a meditative section featuring phase-shifted Indian instrumentation such as harp (swarmandal) and sitar, much of which is reversed through the use of backwards tape loops. Hand drums (tabla tarang) then enter, along with vocals (sung in Nepali) that pan from one side to the other across the stereo image. Leng describes the effect as "hauntingly fragile male and female Indian voices in a love duet".

The second part begins at 2:27 with what Leng terms "a charging John Barham piano vamp answered by a host of flutes". Drums and further orchestration also enter at this point. The third part starts at 3:23 with a portion of white noise atmospherics, which is soon contrasted by a graceful trumpet solo. Dual harmonica parts enter, interspersed with a police siren, followed by more backwards tape sounds; guitar, flange-treated piano and Mellotron are also heard. Music journalist D.J. Pangburn likens this final part to "Indian-inspired jazz". The song fades out with a slowed-down spoken voice over the sound of church bells.

Leng identifies "Dream Scene" as a "juxtaposition of opposites" due to its contrasting musical styles and moods. He notes that it was recorded several months before "Revolution 9" – Lennon's well-known sound collage, which incorporates musique concrète and other avant-garde elements, and was released on The Beatles (also known as the White Album). Authors Chip Madinger and Mark Easter similarly comment that Harrison's contribution to "Revolution 9" "may have been understated in retrospect after listening to ['Dream Scene']". (Note: Lennon described "Revolution 9" as a collaboration between himself and Yoko Ono. Harrison was the only other member of the Beatles to participate in the recording.)

== Release ==
Wonderwall Music was the first solo release by a member of the Beatles, as well as the first album issued on their new record label, Apple Records. Apple released the album on 1 November 1968 in Britain, with the US release following on 2 December. "Dream Scene" was sequenced as the final track on side one of the LP. In the US, Capitol Records, Apple's distributor, re-banded several of the tracks, so that the song appeared as part of a medley with the three tracks preceding it: "Greasy Legs", "Ski-ing" and "Gat Kirwani". On the mono version of the album, issued in the UK only, the mix for "Dream Scene" differed from the stereo release, due to the shorter fade-in given to the Indian segment and, in the final segment, differences in the content and positioning of the loops. The LP insert carried a message reading: "Special thanks to friends, loops and all the staff at EMI Bombay."

According to Simon Leng, the Wonderwall project demonstrated that "There were now three Beatles who held firm artistic visions". He highlights "Dream Scene" in particular, describing it as a "musical acid trip" that "rivals anything on Sgt. Pepper for sheer freak-out effect". In the 1980s, Harrison was dismissive of the Western music on the album, calling it "loads of horrible mellotron stuff and a police siren". Barham said he considered "Dream Scene" to be the album's "most extraordinary track".

== Critical reception ==
In a review for Uncut, Richard Williams likens Wonderwall Music to an exploded diagram of the Beatles' "overtly experimental period (1965–68)" on which "Dream Scene" is "a collage of found sounds, anticipating Lennon's 'Revolution No. 9'". New Zealand Herald critic Graham Reid calls the song "experimental in [the] finest sense of the word" and "by far the most psychedelic and out-there piece by any Beatle to that time". He adds that "towards the end you can almost anticipate Lennon's Revolution 9 coming in." In his review for Classic Rock magazine, former Mojo editor Paul Trynka describes it as "serene" and, along with "Greasy Legs" and "Party Seacombe" from the same album, an example of Harrison's standing as "a talented film composer with a gift for evocative soundscapes".

Writing for the Death and Taxes website, D.J. Pangburn highlights "Dream Scene" as his favourite track on an album that, as a non-vocal soundtrack, is often overlooked, yet contains individual pieces that show Harrison to be "every bit the psychedelic equal of Lennon" and "an astute musicologist and modern-day interpreter, surpassing even McCartney". Madison Desler of Paste includes the track in her list of the 20 best songs from Harrison's solo career. She writes: "'Dream Scene' is the standout [on Wonderwall Music]; an astral, Indian-influenced instrumental that goes from whimsical to nightmarish. It's the perfect accompaniment to the magic-mushrooms visuals of the scene, and evidence of a different side of Harrison's talents." In a review for Uncut's Ultimate Music Guide issue on Harrison, Jon Dale gives the song four stars out of five and says that Harrison "flies in tape loops, edits together drone sequences, spools everything backwards, winds a police siren around a blasting harmonica, and generally treats the studio ... as the playground it so rightly is".

== Sources ==
- Harry Castleman & Walter J. Podrazik, All Together Now: The First Complete Beatles Discography 1961–1975, Ballantine Books (New York, NY, 1976; ISBN 0-345-25680-8).
- Alan Clayson, George Harrison, Sanctuary (London, 2003; ISBN 1-86074-489-3).
- Walter Everett, The Beatles as Musicians: Revolver Through the Anthology, Oxford University Press (New York, NY, 1999; ISBN 0-19-509553-7).
- Bill Harry, The George Harrison Encyclopedia, Virgin Books (London, 2003; ISBN 978-0-7535-0822-0).
- Thom Holmes, Electronic and Experimental Music: Technology, Music, and Culture (4th edn), Routledge (New York, NY, 2012; ISBN 978-0-415-89636-8).
- Kevin Howlett, "Wonderwall Music" (liner note essay), Wonderwall Music CD booklet (Apple Records, 2014; produced by George Harrison).
- Ian Inglis, The Words and Music of George Harrison, Praeger (Santa Barbara, CA, 2010; ISBN 978-0-313-37532-3).
- Peter Lavezzoli, The Dawn of Indian Music in the West, Continuum (New York, NY, 2006; ISBN 0-8264-2819-3).
- Simon Leng, While My Guitar Gently Weeps: The Music of George Harrison, Hal Leonard (Milwaukee, WI, 2006; ISBN 1-4234-0609-5).
- Ian MacDonald, Revolution in the Head: The Beatles' Records and the Sixties, Pimlico (London, 1998; ISBN 0-7126-6697-4).
- Chip Madinger & Mark Easter, Eight Arms to Hold You: The Solo Beatles Compendium, 44.1 Productions (Chesterfield, MO, 2000; ISBN 0-615-11724-4).
- Barry Miles, The Beatles Diary Volume 1: The Beatles Years, Omnibus Press (London, 2001; ISBN 0-7119-8308-9).
- Mojo Special Limited Edition: 1000 Days of Revolution (The Beatles' Final Years – Jan 1, 1968 to Sept 27, 1970), Emap (London, 2003).
- Robert Rodriguez, Fab Four FAQ 2.0: The Beatles' Solo Years, 1970–1980, Backbeat Books (Milwaukee, WI, 2010; ISBN 978-1-4165-9093-4).
- Bruce Spizer, The Beatles Solo on Apple Records, 498 Productions (New Orleans, LA, 2005; ISBN 0-9662649-5-9).
- Kenneth Womack, The Beatles Encyclopedia: Everything Fab Four, ABC-CLIO (Santa Barbara, CA, 2014; ISBN 978-0-3133-9171-2).
