= Ashton, Gardner and Dyke =

British rock trio

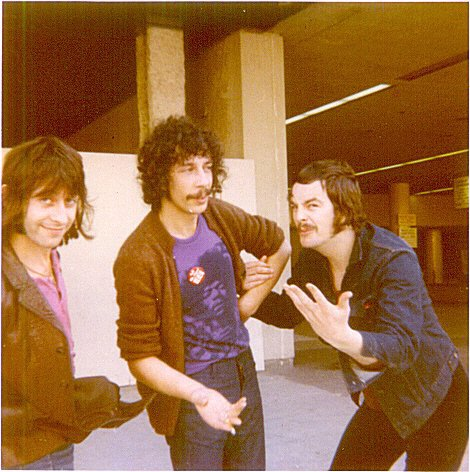
- Kim Gardner (left) and Tony Ashton (right) of the band (Roy Dyke is not pictured); in the centre is their supporting guitarist Mick Liber

Background information
- Also known as: Ashton, Gardner, Dyke and Co.
- Origin: London, England
- Genres: Rock; jazz-rock; blues-rock
- Years active: 1968–1972
- Labels: Polydor; Capitol
- Past members: Tony Ashton; Kim Gardner; Roy Dyke

Ashton, Gardner and Dyke were a British rock trio, most popular in the early 1970s. They are best remembered for their song, "The Resurrection Shuffle", a transatlantic Top 40 one-hit wonder in 1971.

== History ==
Founding band member Tony Ashton first met the drummer Roy Dyke when playing with various Blackpool-based groups.

Ashton was invited to join the Liverpool beat group The Remo Four as organist/vocalist, whilst Roy Dyke became the group's drummer, having joined them in 1963. Their best work came in 1966 when they released their album Smile!. Before their breakup in 1968, they backed George Harrison on his album Wonderwall Music. Harrison later played guitar on their song "I'm Your Spiritual Breadman".

Ashton and Dyke then joined forces in 1968 with the bassist Kim Gardner, who had previously played in minor British groups The Birds and The Creation. The three simply called themselves Ashton, Gardner and Dyke. Mick Liber, formerly of Python Lee Jackson, played lead guitar with the group.

They released their first single "Maiden Voyage"/"See The Sun In My Eyes" on Polydor Records in 1969, but it flopped. Also in the band for a period of time as the producer of their first single, and on the cover of their "Best Of" CD was ex-Bee Gees guitarist Vince Melouney.

However, their next single, "Resurrection Shuffle" on Capitol Records, made them household names. The song entered the UK Singles Chart on 16 January 1971, had a chart life of 14 weeks, and peaked at Number 3. The song reached number 40 in the U.S. Billboard Hot 100 chart. The song was their only hit record, earning them the designation of one-hit wonders. The trio soon hired a small group of musicians to help them perform on stage; these members were Scottish/Australian guitarist Mick Liber (of Python Lee Jackson fame), and a brass section that included Lyle Jenkins (saxophone) and Dave Caswell (trumpet) of the Birmingham band Galliard, as well as a trombone player, John Mumford (formerly of Bruce Turner's Jump band), was also briefly with them.

They performed the song on BBC's Top of the Pops, on 27 December 1971, with Ashton singing live and remembering most of the words. The song has since been covered by a number of artists, including Tom Jones and Clarence Clemons.

Their follow-up single "Can You Get It" lacked the general boisterous appeal of "Resurrection Shuffle", and failed to chart. Nevertheless, Ashton Gardner and Dyke persevered and recorded three albums. The trio also backed Irish singer Jonathan Kelly on his 1970 debut album and the following year, they appeared together with other British jazz and rock musicians on Leigh Stephens' Cast of Thousands (1971).

With the release of their final studio album, What A Bloody Long Days It's Been, came a change to the band name, as they were credited on the album as Ashton, Gardner, Dyke and Co., as a way to incorporate their supporting musicians without changing the recognisable name.

Their last recording together was a collaboration with Jon Lord on the soundtrack for a B movie, The Last Rebel, starring former gridiron star, Joe Namath. Ashton also appeared on Lord's first solo album Gemini Suite in 1972. The trio finally split the same year.

== Afterwards ==
After the band's demise, Tony Ashton went on to play for Medicine Head, and was briefly in Family before teaming up again with Deep Purple's Jon Lord in Ashton & Lord. Later still he appeared with Lord and Purple's drummer Ian Paice as Paice Ashton Lord. Dyke and then Gardner joined Badger.

Ashton died of cancer on 28 May 2001 in London, aged 55. Gardner also died of cancer on 24 October 2001, in Los Angeles, California, aged 53.

== Band members ==
Ashton, Gardner and Dyke

- Tony Ashton — (born Edward Anthony Ashton, 1 March 1946, Blackburn, Lancashire; died 28 May 2001) — keyboards, vocals
- Kim Gardner — (born 27 January 1948, Dulwich, London; died 24 October 2001) — bass
- Roy Dyke — (born 13 February 1945, Liverpool, Lancashire) — drums

Supporting musicians

- Vince Melouney (born 18 August 1945, Sydney, Australia) — guitar, producer (1969)
- Howie Casey (born 12 July 1937, Huyton, Liverpool, Lancashire) — saxophone (1970) (session saxophonist on "The Resurrection Shuffle")
- Mick Liber — (born 1 March 1944, Peebles, Scotland) — lead guitar (1971–1972)
- Dave Caswell (born 1 March 1942, Birmingham, Worcestershire) — trumpet (1971–1972)
- Lyle Jenkins (born 18 November 1937, Oxford, Oxfordshire; deceased) — saxophone (1971–1972)
- John Mumford (born 22 September 1940, London) — trombone (1971)

== Discography ==
=== Studio albums ===
Year	Title	Billboard 200	Label + Cat. No.
1969	Ashton, Gardner and Dyke	—	Polydor – 583 081
1971	The Worst of Ashton, Gardner and Dyke (US - Ashton, Gardner & Duke - Resurrection Shuffle)	185	Capitol – EST 563
1972	What A Bloody Long Day It's Been	—	Capitol – EST 862

=== Soundtracks ===
Year	Title	With	Label + Cat. No.
1971	The Last Rebel • Original Motion Picture Soundtrack	Jon Lord	Capitol – SW-827
2002	The Last Rebel (Expanded Edition)	Jon Lord	Purple – PUR 309

=== Live albums ===
Year	Title	Label + Cat. No.
2002	Let It Roll – Live 1971	Purple – PUR 307
2011	Live In Montreux 1970	Thompson Music

=== Singles ===
Year	Title	Label + Cat. No.	Peak chart positions												
Year	Title	Label + Cat. No.	UK	AUS (Go-Set)	AUS (KMR)	BEL (FLA)	BEL (WAL)	CAN	GER	IRE	MAL	NL (40)	NL (100)	US (BH)	US (CB)
1969	A: "Maiden Voyage" B: "See The Sun In My Eyes"	Polydor – 56306	—	—	—	—	—	—	—	—	—	—	—	—	—
1970	A: "The Resurrection Shuffle" B: "Hymn To Everyone"	Capitol – CL 15665	3	13	16	28	35	22	22	6	1	27	25	40	37
1971	A: "Can You Get It" B: "Delirium"	Capitol – CL 15684	—	—	—	—	—	—	44	—	—	33	24	—	—
1972	A: "Still Got A Long Way To Go"	Capitol	—	—	—	—	—	—	—	—	—	—	—	—	—

== See also ==
- List of one-hit wonders on the UK Singles Chart
