= Roy Dyke =

British drummer (born 1945)

- Born: 13 February 1945 (age 81); Liverpool, England
- Genres: Rock; pop; beat
- Instrument: Drums
- Years active: 1959–present
- Formerly of: The Remo Four, Ashton, Gardner and Dyke, Badger

Roy Dyke (born 13 February 1945 in Liverpool), is a rock drummer noted for his playing with The Remo Four, Ashton, Gardner and Dyke, and Badger.

== Career ==
One of Dyke's first bands was Mike & The Creoles in 1959. In early 1963, Dyke joined The Remo Four, replacing Harry Prytherch. In the early 1960s, the Remo Four backed Tommy Quickly, then briefly Billy J. Kramer (as "The New Dakotas"), and then in the late 1960s backed Billy Fury. They were also the backing band on George Harrison's first solo album, Wonderwall, in December 1968.* Spizer, Bruce (2005), The Beatles Solo on Apple Records, New Orleans, LA: 498 Productions, p. 206, ISBN 0-9662649-5-9.

In 1968, Dyke and Tony Ashton, who had joined The Remo Four as a keyboardist in 1965, teamed up with bassist Kim Gardner of The Creation and formed Ashton, Gardner and Dyke. In 1970, Ashton, Gardner and Dyke had their first and only UK charting single with "The Resurrection Shuffle". Written by Ashton, the song peaked at number three on the UK Charts. The trio also backed Irish singer Jonathan Kelly on his 1970 debut album, appeared on Leigh Stephens' Cast of Thousands in 1971, and in 1972, collaborated with Deep Purple keyboardist Jon Lord for the soundtrack of the film The Last Rebel. Shortly after the soundtrack, Ashton, Gardner and Dyke disbanded.

Around the same time AG&D disbanded, Dyke had joined Badger, a band formed by Tony Kaye, who had just left Yes. Dyke introduced Brian Parrish into the band as singer and guitarist, and the following year released their first album, One Live Badger. In 1974, just before recording their second album, White Lady, all but Dyke and Kaye left the band, briefly leaving Badger a duo, before Dyke recruited Gardner to join them on bass. White Lady was recorded over six months in New Orleans, featured Jeff Beck on the title track, and was released in June 1974, but soon after Gardner and singer Jackie Lomax left to form a new group, which led to Badgers dissolvement.

Dyke moved to Germany in 1975, and in 1978, joined Bauer, Garn & Dyke, with Hannes Bauer (born 1952) and Tom Garn. Formed by Bauer, he met Dyke in a supermarket and hired Garn from a music magazine. They released two studio albums. In 1980, Dyke was a featured artist on Axel Zwingenberger's album Power House Boogie. Dyke was for one time only an actor, appearing in the film Brennende Betten (Burning Bends in English), featuring Ian Dury, as an English worker. In spring 1994, he reunited with Ashton on German television, and performed the songs "Wooly Bully" and "No Money Down". In 1998, he joined German based band Boogie House. They released two live albums on CD with Dyke, and he was still a member of the group until he left in 2013.

== Personal life ==
Dyke is married to Stacia Blake, a former dancer with Hawkwind, and they have a daughter, who is also a musician in Germany. Dyke relocated to Germany in 1975, after visitors from Germany wanted him to play in a band with him in Hamburg.

== Discography ==
With The Remo Four

- Smile! (1966)
- Attention (1973)

With George Harrison

- Wonderwall Music (1968)

With Ashton, Gardner and Dyke

- Ashton Gardner and Dyke (1969)
- The Worst of Ashton, Gardner + Dyke (1970)
- What a Bloody Long Day It's Been (1972)
- Last Rebel (1973)
- Let it Roll: Live on Stage 1971 (2001)

With Badger

- One Live Badger (1973)
- White Lady (1974)

With Pat Travers

- Pat Travers (1976)
- Four Play (2005)

With Bauer, Garn & Dyke

- Sturmfrei (1979)
- Himmel, Arsch & Zwirn (1982)

With B.Sharp

- B.Sharp (1982)
- You're Making Me Mad (1983)
- Here Come the Blues Again (1991)

With Boogie House

- Just For Fun (1998)
- Cotton Club Jam (2003)

With other bands

- With Family Its Only a Movie (1973)
- With Curtiss Maldoon Maldoon (1973)
- With Medicine Head One and One is One (1973)
- With Chris Barber Drat that Frattle Rat (1974)
- With Axel Zwingenberger Powerhouse Boogie (1979)
