= Wonderwall Music =

Soundtrack album / studio album by George Harrison
- Released: 1 November 1968
- Recorded: 22 November 1967 – 11 February 1968
- Studios: EMI and De Lane Lea (London); His Master's Voice (Bombay)
- Genres: Indian classical; raga rock; experimental; world
- Length: 45:43
- Label: Apple
- Producer: George Harrison

George Harrison chronology
Wonderwall Music (1968)	Electronic Sound (1969)

Wonderwall Music is the debut solo studio album by the English musician George Harrison and the soundtrack to the 1968 film Wonderwall, directed by Joe Massot. Released in November 1968, it was the first solo album by a member of the Beatles, and the first album issued on the band's Apple record label. The tracks are mostly instrumental pieces, with some featuring non-English language vocals and one track with English lyrics, mostly short musical vignettes. Following his Indian-styled songs for the Beatles since 1966, he used the film score to further promote Indian classical music by introducing rock audiences to instruments that were relatively little known in the West — including shehnai, sarod, tar shehnai, tanpura and santoor. The Indian pieces are contrasted by Western musical selections, in the psychedelic rock, experimental, country and ragtime styles.

Harrison recorded the album between November 1967 and February 1968, with sessions taking place in London and Bombay. One of his collaborators on the project was classical pianist and orchestral arranger John Barham, while other contributors include Indian classical musicians Aashish Khan, Shivkumar Sharma, Shankar Ghosh and Mahapurush Misra. The Western music features contributions from Tony Ashton and his band the Remo Four, as well as guest appearances by Eric Clapton and Ringo Starr. Harrison recorded many other pieces that appeared in Wonderwall but not on the soundtrack album, and the Beatles' 1968 B-side "The Inner Light" also originated from his time in Bombay. Although the Wonderwall project marked the end of Harrison's direct involvement with Indian music as a musician and songwriter, it inspired his later collaborations with Ravi Shankar, including the 1974 Music Festival from India.

The album cover consists of a painting by American artist Bob Gill in which, as in Massot's film, two contrasting worlds are separated by a wall, with only a small gap allowing visual access between them. Harrison omitted his own name from the list of performing musicians, leading to an assumption that he had merely produced and arranged the music. The 2014 reissue of Wonderwall Music recognises his contributions on keyboards and guitar. The album was first remastered for CD release in 1992, for which former Apple executive Derek Taylor supplied a liner-note essay.

While viewed as a curiosity by some rock music critics, Wonderwall Music is recognised for its inventiveness in fusing Western and Eastern sounds, and as being a precursor to the 1980s world music trend. The album's title inspired that of Oasis' 1995 hit song "Wonderwall". Harrison's full soundtrack for the film was made available on DVD in early 2014, as part of the two-disc Wonderwall Collector's Edition. In September that year, the album was reissued in remastered form as part of Harrison's Apple Years 1968–75 box set, with the addition of three bonus tracks.

== Background ==
George Harrison first met Joe Massot while the Beatles were filming Help! in early 1965. He agreed to write the musical score for Massot's film Wonderwall in October 1967, after the Bee Gees had become unavailable. It was Harrison's first formal music project outside the Beatles and coincided with his continued immersion in Indian classical music. Since 1966, this association with India had given Harrison a distinct musical identity beside the band's primary songwriters, John Lennon and Paul McCartney. While he had minimal interest in the Beatles' main projects during 1967 – the album Sgt. Pepper's Lonely Hearts Club Band and their television film Magical Mystery Tour – Harrison led the group in terms of their shared philosophical direction, as his bandmates followed him in embracing Transcendental Meditation under the guidance of Maharishi Mahesh Yogi.

Harrison viewed Wonderwall at Twickenham Film Studios with Massot and was intrigued by the storyline. The film's premise concerns a lonely professor (played by Irish actor Jack MacGowran) and his increasing obsession with his female neighbour, a fashion model named Penny Lane (played by Jane Birkin), whom he spies on via a hole in the wall separating their apartments. In the context of 1960s Swinging London, the contrast between their existences symbolised the division between traditional norms and the younger generation's progressive thinking. In his soundtrack for the film, Harrison conveyed this contrast further in terms of the duality between psychedelia and his Hindu-aligned spiritual convictions. According to author Simon Leng: "The lack of dialogue left acres of room for music to speak, and a soupçon of cosmic apotheosis also helped ... Wonderwall touched on themes that would come to preoccupy George Harrison – critically, the objectification of celebrities and the shallowness of fame."

== Concept and composition ==
I was getting so into Indian music by then that I decided to use the assignment as an excuse for a musical anthology to help spread the word.

— George Harrison to Musician magazine, November 1987

Given full artistic control by Massot, Harrison approached the project as an opportunity to further educate rock and pop audiences in aspects of Indian music. Having incorporated sitar, tanpura, swarmandal, dilruba and tabla in his work with the Beatles, Harrison sought to include less well-known Indian musical instruments. Among these, the oboe-like shehnai, traditionally used in religious ceremonies, was an instrument that Harrison had enthused about after seeing Bismillah Khan perform at the Hollywood Bowl in August 1967. Also prominent on the soundtrack is the tar shehnai, a bow-played string instrument that is similar to an esraj. Other instrumentation introduced on Wonderwall Music includes the sarod, similar to a lute, and the santoor, a type of hammered dulcimer with up to 100 strings. Having used personnel from the Asian Music Circle in north London on his Beatles songs "Love You To" and "Within You Without You", in addition to his own sitar playing, Harrison decided to record part of the soundtrack in Bombay, the centre of India's film industry, in order to work with some of the country's best musicians.

The Wonderwall score was Harrison's first opportunity to compose extensively for a single project. He later described how he went about preparing the music: "I had a regular wind-up stopwatch and I watched the film to 'spot-in' the music with the watch. I wrote the timings down in my book, then I'd go to [the recording studio], make up a piece, record it." As with his songs for the Beatles over this period, including "Within You Without You" and "Blue Jay Way", he composed mainly on keyboard instruments such as piano or organ, rather than guitar. In addition to the Indian pieces, Harrison wrote and arranged selections in Western musical styles. In some cases, these pieces were outlined to the musicians at the recording session by Harrison, on guitar, and they then improvised on his ideas. With other selections, he first made a demo, which the musicians followed.

Harrison collaborated on much of the project with John Barham, who had studied composition under Harrison's sitar teacher, Ravi Shankar. A classically trained pianist and musical arranger, Barham notated some of the melodies that Harrison sang to him and transcribed them onto staves. Leng describes Barham as Harrison's "fellow traveler", due to the two musicians' shared appreciation of Indian classical music. He adds that their musical compatibility made Barham a natural choice over George Martin, the Beatles' producer and orchestral arranger. (Note: The Wonderwall sessions were officially Harrison's first as a producer, although he had directed the recording of "Love You To" and "Within You Without You" over 1966–67 with minimal input from Martin and the other Beatles.)

== Recording ==
=== London, November 1967 – January 1968 ===
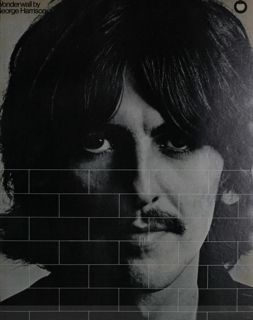
Billboard ad for Wonderwall Music, December 1968

The first session for the Wonderwall soundtrack took place on 22 November 1967 at EMI Studios (now Abbey Road Studios) in London. That day, Harrison recorded with a tabla player and flautists Richard Adeney and Jack Ellory, taping the pieces "Swordfencing", "India", "Backwards Tabla" and "Backwards Tones". On 23 November, he carried out further work on some of these selections, with two oboe players, a trumpeter and two flautists. Authors Chip Madinger and Mark Easter state that some of these recordings may have been used as musical cues in the film but excluded from the soundtrack album, while "Swordfencing" was a piece that Harrison incorporated into "Dream Scene" on the album. (Note: According to Madinger and Easter, in addition to most of what appears on the album, the Wonderwall film contained nineteen of Harrison's "musical cues and tracks ... ranging anywhere from ten seconds to a couple of minutes in length" that were omitted from the soundtrack album.) Over this period, Harrison also worked at a second London location, De Lane Lea Studios. According to a contemporary issue of Beatles Monthly magazine, the sessions continued at Abbey Road on 11, 20 and 31 December.

The contributing musicians included Indian sarodya Aashish Khan and tablist Mahapurush Misra, the last of whom was the regular accompanist to Khan's father, Ali Akbar Khan. Aashish Khan and Misra's contributions were recorded at Abbey Road, rather than later in India, since the pair were performing in London in December 1967. Barham attended this session and also contributed to some of the Western recordings for Wonderwall, playing piano, harmonium and flugelhorn, and providing orchestral arrangements for flutes, oboes and trumpet. Another session with some unnamed Indian musicians took place on 5 January 1968.

The main participants on the Western pieces were the Remo Four, whose first session with Harrison was on 22 December. The band were an instrumental group from Liverpool that had toured with the Beatles in 1964 and comprised Colin Manley (guitar), Tony Ashton (keyboards), Phillip Rogers (bass) and Roy Dyke (drums). Ashton contributed on tack (or jangle) piano and organ, and played the majority of the Mellotron parts that are prominent on the album.

Ringo Starr and Eric Clapton joined Harrison to record "Ski-ing" on 2–3 January. Credited only on the US release, under the pseudonym "Eddie Clayton", Clapton's appearance marked the first of several collaborations between him and Harrison over 1968–71. Peter Tork of the Monkees played banjo, although his contribution, recorded in December 1967, was to a track that only appeared in the film.

=== Bombay, January 1968 ===
It was fantastic really. The studio is on top of the offices ... [and] if you listen closely to some of the Indian tracks on the LP you can hear taxis going by ... I mixed everything as we did it there, and that was nice enough because you get spoiled working on eight and sixteen tracks.

— Harrison in 1992, recalling the primitive recording facilities at His Master's Voice studios in Bombay

Harrison recorded the rest of the Indian selections between 9 and 13 January at His Master's Voice in Bombay. In contrast to the multitrack recording carried out at Abbey Road, the music was captured on a two-track tape machine, which replaced the studio's usual mono equipment. Harrison recalled that EMI India's managing director, Bhaskar Menon, personally delivered this machine, a STEEDS stereo recorder, by train from Calcutta. The Bombay studio's soundproofing was similarly inadequate, resulting in traffic noise from the street below appearing on pieces such as "In the Park".

On 10 January, Reuters and BBC News filmed Harrison working with three of the Indian musicians at His Master's Voice. A brief portion of this footage was broadcast in Britain on 11 January. In Menon's recollection, following each day's recording session, Harrison returned to his rooms at the Taj Mahal Hotel and studiously documented his observations on the sounds and nuances of the various Indian instruments. Menon described the process as "a kind of immersion for him into the folk music of India".

According to author Alan Clayson, the Indian players were "fascinated" to be following Western rules of harmony for the first time. The musicians were recruited by Shambhu Das, who ran Shankar's Kinnara School of Music in Bombay, and Vijay Dubey, the head of A&R for His Master's Voice in India. (Note: A protégé of Shankar's, Das had handled much of Harrison's sitar tuition during the latter's visit to India in late 1966. Harrison sent Das a telegram on 29 December 1967, requesting "2 or 3 shanhai 3 sitar and one dha shanhai" for the Wonderwall sessions.) The shehnai players were Sharad Kumar and Hanuman Jadev, while the tar shehnaist was Vinayak Vora. Shambhu Das and Indranil Bhattacharya were the sitarists, and Chandrashekhar Naringrekar played surbahar (a low-register version of the sitar). The tablist was Shankar Ghosh, although the original album credits listed him on sitar.

Rijram Desad, a multi-instrumentalist whose past work included film scores and ballets with vocalists such as Lata Mangeshkar, played Indian harmonium and tabla tarang. (Note: A melodic percussion instrument, the tabla tarang consists of between ten and sixteen individually tuned hand drums, specifically the tabla's treble-variety dayan, which are set in a semicircle around the player.) Shivkumar Sharma contributed on santoor, and the bansuri (bamboo flute) was played by S.R. Kenkare. Hariprasad Chaurasia also contributed on bansuri, but only after the soundtrack pieces had been completed, and the efficient progress of the sessions allowed Harrison to record some other compositions.

=== London, January–February 1968 ===
After returning to England on 18 January, Harrison recorded the majority of the Western music for Wonderwall with the Remo Four, again at Abbey Road. Author Bruce Spizer writes that Harrison played piano, guitar and Mellotron on some of the Western tracks. In addition, according to Manley, Harrison provided the steel guitar part on "Cowboy Music", even though Manley is credited on the album sleeve. Also present at the sessions were Dutch designers the Fool – Simon Posthuma, Marijke Koger and Josje Leeger – who had created the psychedelic-themed sets for Massot's film. (Note: The Fool were the Beatles' preferred designers over 1967–68. In addition to carrying out individual assignments for Harrison and Lennon, they painted a three-storey-high mural on the outside wall of the band's new retail venture, Apple Boutique, in Baker Street, London.) Well known for his theme tune to BBC television's Dixon of Dock Green, Tommy Reilly played on the soundtrack after Harrison had asked Martin to suggest a good harmonica player.

At various stages while working on the project, Harrison returned to Twickenham to ensure that each musical piece married up with its scene in the film; he later recalled: "it always worked. It was always right." Final mixing began on 31 January, and a late overdubbing session took place on 11 February, when extra sound effects were added to "Dream Scene". Harrison mixed the recordings with Ken Scott, completing stereo and mono versions of the album. (Note: Among the differences in the mono Wonderwall Music, shorter fadeouts were used on some of the tracks. "Red Lady Too" was given a slightly longer fadeout, relative to the stereo mix, along with heavy flanging treatment on one of the piano parts.) Harrison then went back to India on 15 February, with Lennon and their wives, to study meditation with the Maharishi in Rishikesh.

Having been allocated a budget of £600, Harrison eventually spent £15,000 on recording the film soundtrack, paying the difference himself. One of the non-soundtrack pieces taped at the end of the Bombay sessions was "The Inner Light", which he completed at Abbey Road in early February. This song became the first Harrison composition to appear on a Beatles single when it was issued as the B-side to "Lady Madonna" in March 1968, a release that served to cover the band's absence in Rishikesh. The Remo Four song "In the First Place" was another product of the Wonderwall sessions, although the track remained unreleased until the late 1990s. In 1993, Harrison told Simpsons creator Matt Groening that Wonderwall Music had been his most enjoyable album to make.

== Musical content ==
The nineteen tracks on Wonderwall Music range from just over a minute in length to five-and-a-half minutes. On some pressings of the 1968 LP, various pieces lacked mastering rills between them; with these selections instead presented as medleys, the number of distinct album tracks was reduced to twelve. On many of the Indian selections, instruments such as sitar, surbahar and harmonium provide a drone-like backing, over which Harrison's chosen instrument plays the main musical theme.

In the original album credits, Harrison was listed as producer, writer and arranger but was not included among the performers, leading to an assumption that he did not play on the recordings. After consulting Barham in 2002 for his book While My Guitar Gently Weeps, Leng credited Harrison as a performing musician, and Spizer also recognised him in his track-by-track list, published in 2005. The performer credits in the 2014 reissue of Wonderwall Music rectified the situation, and list Harrison on piano and guitar.

=== Side one ===
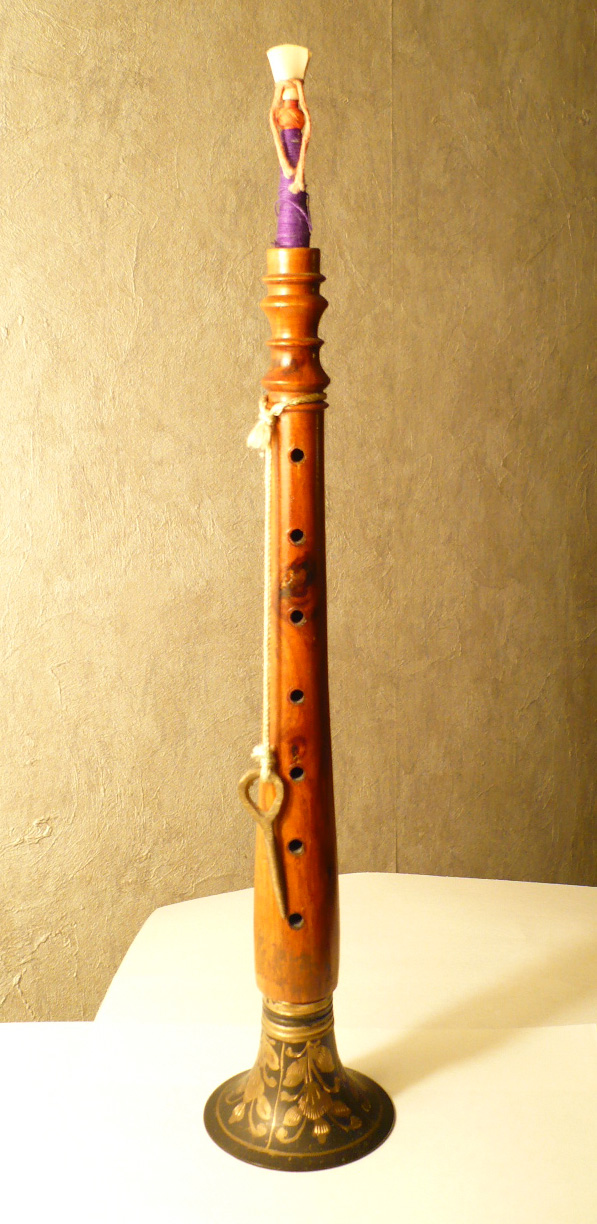
The double-reed shehnai, one of several Indian musical instruments Harrison used on Wonderwall Music

The album opens with "Microbes", which consists of call-and-response shehnai parts and was partly based on the raga Darbari Kanada. The waltz-time "Red Lady Too" includes what musicologist Walter Everett describes as "'Moonlight' Sonata-like suspensions on piano, honky-tonk piano, Mellotron, and drums". Ashton performed the tack piano part, with Barham supplying the lower-register piano accompaniment. On "Tabla and Pakavaj", Mahapurush Misra played the two types of hand drums named in the title, the barrel-shaped pakhavaj being another mainstay of Hindustani classical music. "In the Park" includes Sharma's santoor alternating solos with surbahar and tabla tarang. Neither of these last two tracks appears in the film.

Author Peter Lavezzoli recognises "Harrison's dry humor" in "the honky-tonk, piano-driven" "Drilling a Home". The song is subject to dramatic changing of pitch, from the key of G up to B♭, through the tape being sped up. In the film, only the portion up to the sound of a rainstorm is used. The ragtime feel of the track is accentuated by an arrangement that includes tack piano, horns and banjo, with the last two sounds created through Ashton's use of different settings on the Mellotron. Author Ian Inglis writes of the effectiveness of "Drilling a Home": "its jangle piano instantly recreates the mood of a crowded saloon in a frontier town, or a Laurel and Hardy or Keystone Cops pursuit." The track segues into "Guru Vandana", another Bombay-recorded piece featuring multiple shehnais. The title references Guru Vandana, a Hindu prayer in honour of God and one's teacher. "Greasy Legs" consists of harmonium and Mellotron, including parts played on the latter instrument's flute, organ and cello settings.

George told me he'd like me to play on something, or we'd write something as we went along ... You know, it was very experimental, and it was good fun.

— Eric Clapton, discussing his involvement on the track "Ski-ing"

On "Ski-ing", Clapton plays a blues-based guitar riff treated with a fuzz-tone effect, over a rock rhythm and heavy tanpura drone. While Spizer and Everett credit all four electric guitar parts (two of which were taped backwards) to Clapton alone, he recalls that "we put down this thing [on tape] and George then put backwards guitar on it." The seagull-like sounds of the guitars segue into "Gat Kirwani", a fast-paced Indian piece with Aashish Khan on sarod, backed by sitar and Misra's tabla. The performance is based on the similarly named raga, which Harrison had suggested that Khan play.

"Dream Scene" is a combination of segments that Harrison edited together. Along with "Ski-ing", it is the only track on the album that combines Indian and Western music. The song consists of three distinct pieces, the first of which is a meditative section containing phase-shifted instrumentation such as tabla tarang, harp (swarmandal) and sitar, and singing. (Note: Harrison sourced the vocals from EMI's sound library at Abbey Road.) The music is delivered via backwards-played tape loops as the vocals pan from one side to the other across the stereo image. The other two pieces include a section comprising Barham's piano and flutes, followed by a trumpet solo, harmonica interspersed with a police siren, and more backwards tape loops. The song fades out with a slowed-down spoken voice over the sound of church bells. Leng notes that "Dream Scene" was recorded several months before Lennon's experimental sound collage "Revolution 9", released on the double album The Beatles. (Note: Madinger and Easter similarly comment that Harrison's contribution to "Revolution 9" "may have been understated in retrospect after listening to this".)

=== Side two ===
"Party Seacombe" includes a rock accompaniment that Clayson likens to the style of Pink Floyd, and the song equally recalls the Beatles' instrumental "Flying", with which it shares a twenty-bar blues structure. Recorded with the Remo Four, it includes wah-effected lead guitars, one of which resembles the sound of a human voice; phase-shifted treatment on the acoustic rhythm guitar; and additional drums and percussion, possibly played by Starr. Writing for NME Originals in 2005, Adrian Thrills described the track as "Whimsical '60s psychedelia from George's experimental dabblings".

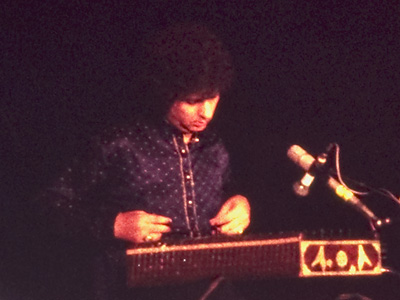
Shivkumar Sharma performing on santoor, an instrument he pioneered in Indian classical music

The two Indian pieces "Love Scene" and "Crying" form another medley, with the first track featuring Khan's call-and-response sarod parts. Overdubbing was unprecedented in Indian music until this time, and Khan later said he was "thrilled" with the effect on "Love Scene", where the sarods "[play] to each other like two lovers in a romantic mood". The piece resulted from Barham's suggestion that Khan play Mauj-Khamaj, a raga created by his grandfather, Allauddin Khan. Described by Madinger and Easter as "aptly titled", "Crying" contains the mournful tones of a tar shehnai. (Note: In 1981, Harrison used part of this recording of "Crying" at the end of "Save the World", the closing song on his album Somewhere in England.)

"Cowboy Music" is a country-and-western piece that Inglis likens to the incidental music typically heard in American westerns from the 1940s. The performance includes steel guitar and contributions from the Remo Four, along with Reilly on harmonica. Returning to the Indian style, "Fantasy Sequins" combines tar shehnai with harmonium, played by Desad, and bell-like percussion known as khas. (Note: According to author John Winn, "Fantasy Sequins" was the song being worked on when the BBC and Reuters crews filmed the 10 January session. Winn cites the line-up of musicians seen in the existing silent footage, and the fact that the visual images match the progression heard in the released song.) This track segues into "On the Bed", although Madinger and Easter say that the correct title, as it appeared on early US copies of the album, should be "Glass Box", which is the name given instead to the Indian piece that follows it. (Note: Madinger and Easter note that after viewing the Wonderwall film, it becomes "very apparent what the title of each track should be", given the context in which the two songs appear. Although the order was correct on US copies, the latter mis-titled "Cowboy Music" as "Cowboy Museum" in the track listing.) "On the Bed" opens with a piano riff from Harrison, which, in Leng's description, is complemented by "spacey steel guitar, and a fugue of flugelhorn countermelodies, added by Barham". The song includes backing from the Remo Four, and Big Jim Sullivan on bass. Harrison overdubbed the sitar-like steel guitar part.

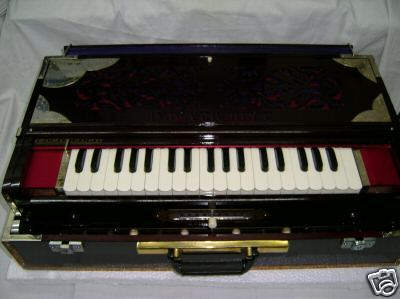
An encased, three-octave Indian harmonium

"Glass Box" is "a high-speed Indian raga", according to Spizer, with Indranil Bhattacharya on sitar. Everett describes "Wonderwall to Be Here" as a tune "based on a minor-mode I-♭VII-♭VI-V progression, styled like Liberacian variations on 'While My Guitar Gently Weeps'". The performance is led by Ashton, on piano, and also includes instrumentation such as organ, acoustic guitar, drums and percussion. Leng views the piece as the soundtrack's "best collective work", adding: "This moving music was a close fit with the scene it covered – a mute passage in which the implied lust of the aging academic turns to compassion for Jane Birkin['s character], whose suicide attempt he witnesses ... Harrison's melody was strongly empathetic to the first appearance of human feeling in the film."

The album closes with "Singing Om", in which a male Indian voice chants the sacred term Om over a musical backing of harmonium and bansuri. The piece is an early example of Harrison blending Vedic chanting with Western harmony, a concept that he explored further in his 1969–70 productions for the Radha Krishna Temple, and also in his post-Beatles songs such as "My Sweet Lord" and "Awaiting on You All".

== Film premiere and aftermath ==
Harrison attended the world premiere of Wonderwall, held at the Cannes Film Festival on 17 May 1968, accompanied by his wife Pattie Boyd, Starr and Birkin. Although he had expected the film's producers to purchase the soundtrack rights and issue the album independently, they declined to do so, leading Massot to suggest that Harrison release it on the Beatles' new label, Apple Records. Wonderwall Music therefore became Apple's first album release, as well as the first solo album by a member of the Beatles.

Inglis writes that Massot was impressed with "the accuracy with which [Harrison's music] illustrated and enhanced the images on screen". Massot asked Harrison to provide the soundtrack for a new film he had written, Zachariah, a western that was eventually made by director George Englund and released in 1970. (Note: According to Massot, he wrote Zachariah after joining Harrison in Rishikesh and witnessing him engaged in "some sort of meditation duel with Lennon to see who was the stronger character".) Although Harrison declined, he later supplied incidental music for Little Malcolm (1974), a film he produced under the aegis of Apple Films, before going on to contribute to soundtracks for his HandMade Films productions in the 1980s, including Time Bandits and Shanghai Surprise.

Together with "The Inner Light", the Wonderwall project marked the end of Harrison's overtly Indian musical phase. After filming his scenes for the Shankar documentary Raga in Los Angeles, in June 1968, he decided to abandon his sitar studies and return to his first instrument, the guitar. In an interview to promote his Apple signing Jackie Lomax, in September, Harrison said that, although Wonderwall Music represented a style of music he had moved on from in recent months, "I still like [the album]. I still think it's very good." He later cited the Bombay sessions for Wonderwall as the inspiration for his 1974 collaborations with Shankar – namely, the Music Festival from India and their subsequent North American tour. Both of these projects featured Indian musicians that Harrison first worked with in January 1968.

== Album artwork ==
Well I remember that wall, that brick ... Bob Gill and I never quite recovered our compatibility but the brick did have to go. Were we right? Yes.

— Derek Taylor, recalling difficulties with artist Bob Gill over Harrison's alteration to his cover design

Apple commissioned American artist Bob Gill to produce a painting for the front cover of Wonderwall Music. Gill recalls that he first attended a meeting at the company's headquarters, where the four Beatles emphasised the importance of the album for their new record label and outlined the concept behind the film. Gill painted a picture in the style of Belgian surrealist René Magritte, showing a formally dressed man "separated by a huge red brick wall from a group of happy bathing Indian maidens", Spizer writes. Apple executive Derek Taylor, whom Harrison had invited to help run the Beatles' label in early 1968, later wrote of Gill's submission: "It was a nice painting but missed the essence of hope." To Gill's chagrin, Harrison requested that a brick be removed from the wall, because he deemed it important to "give the fellow on the other side a chance, just as the Jack MacGowran character had a chance [in the film]".

Back cover of Wonderwall Music, showing a portion of the Berlin Wall

Along with Gill, John Kelly and Alan Aldridge were credited for designing the album's artwork. For the back cover of the LP, Harrison chose a photo of part of the Berlin Wall – a stock image from the Camera Press picture agency – which Kelly and Aldridge then manipulated and mirrored to represent a corner. Taylor describes the result as innovative for its time, with the wall made to look "proud and sharp as the prow of a liner". The sleeve was designed so that the rear face appeared upside down relative to the front. In America, some copies of the LP had the Berlin Wall image mistakenly printed on the front, which made for "a less than exciting cover to be sure", in Madinger and Easter's opinion.

The LP's sleeve insert included a black-and-white photograph of Harrison taken by Astrid Kirchherr, a friend since the Beatles' first residency in Hamburg, Germany, in 1960. Clayson cites Kirchherr's involvement as an example of Harrison's efforts to ensure that friends from the Beatles' pre-fame years were included in the Apple enterprise.

== Release ==
Apple Records originally scheduled the release for late August 1968 to coincide with the label's launch, which was marked by the highly publicised release of its "First Four" singles. (Note: In addition to "Hey Jude" by the Beatles, these four singles included Lomax's debut, "Sour Milk Sea", written and produced by Harrison.) As a result, parts of "Ski-ing", "Cowboy Music" and "Wonderwall to Be Here" were included in Apple, a ten-minute film designed to promote the new label at distributor EMI's international sales conferences. Delayed from this scheduled date, Wonderwall Music instead appeared in November, a few weeks before The Beatles. The release date was 1 November 1968 in Britain (with Apple catalogue number SAPCOR 1),, and 2 December in America (as Apple ST 3350). The mono version of the album was available only in the UK.

Promotion for Wonderwall Music consisted of print advertising, including a full-page advertisement in the 14 December issue of Billboard magazine, and an Apple-prepared poster that superimposed details from Gill's painting onto a photo of Harrison. The album's commercial impact was lessened by its unusual position of being the soundtrack to a film that had yet to receive a general release. (Note: Following the Cannes festival, the producers were unable to secure wide distribution for the film, which had a brief cinema run in London after opening at the CineCenta in Leicester Square in January 1969. In America, Wonderwall was screened publicly for the first time at a 1960s film festival in Hollywood in June 1999.) The album failed to chart in the United Kingdom, but performed surprisingly well in the United States. On Billboard's pop LPs listings, it had a sixteen-week chart run, peaking at number 49 for two weeks in March 1969. On the US Cash Box and Record World charts, the album peaked at numbers 39 and 33, respectively. Wonderwall Music also placed in the top 30 on Canada's RPM albums chart and in West Germany, where it peaked at number 22.

=== Reissues ===
Having been out of print since the 1970s, Wonderwall Music was remastered and issued on CD in June 1992, as part of Apple's campaign to reissue its entire catalogue. The CD booklet contained liner notes by Taylor, as well as stills from Wonderwall and a photo of Harrison working with some of the Indian musicians in 1968.

In November 1997, Massot began preparing a director's cut of Wonderwall, which omitted many of the musical cues that had appeared in the original film but not on the soundtrack album, and instead repeated tracks such as "Ski-ing" and "Cowboy Music" at different points in the film. Harrison supplied Massot with a tape containing various pieces recorded for Wonderwall, which led to the unearthing of the Remo Four's "In the First Place". A Manley–Ashton composition, "In the First Place" was released as a single in January 1999 with Harrison credited as producer, after Massot had incorporated the song into his new audio for the film. Harrison had played on the recording, but according to an article by Martin Lewis, he eschewed any credit as a performer. In March 2014, Harrison's full soundtrack was made available on DVD when the original cut of the film was included in the two-disc set Wonderwall Collector's Edition. (Note: Portions of "Ski-ing" and "Party Seacombe" appear in Martin Scorsese's 2011 documentary George Harrison: Living in the Material World, during which Clapton and Birkin discuss their participation in the project.)

The album was remastered again and reissued in September 2014, as part of the Harrison box set The Apple Years 1968–75. The CD booklet includes a liner-note essay by author Kevin Howlett and an introduction by British Indian composer Nitin Sawhney. The reissue added three bonus tracks: the previously unreleased "Almost Shankara", titled after an epithet for the Hindu deity Shiva and based on a traditional Indian raga; an alternate instrumental take of "The Inner Light", which opens with Harrison's instructions to the musicians at His Master's Voice; and "In the First Place" by the Remo Four". The reissue series was overseen by Harrison's son Dhani, also a film-score composer. In an interview with music journalist David Fricke, he described Wonderwall Music as his personal favourite of his father's Apple solo albums and "a cross of spaghetti-western music, the Chants of India things my Dad [did] with Ravi, and the Beatles' best freakouts". Coinciding with this reissue, the Wonderwall film and soundtrack was the subject of an event held at the Grammy Museum in Los Angeles, partly hosted by music journalist and television writer David Wild.

== Critical reception ==
=== Contemporary reviews ===
Record World's reviewer said that Wonderwall Music was an example of the Beatles beginning to "stretch out on their own separate tethers" and described the mix of Indian and Western music as "moody and pretty". According to Clayson, Films and Filming gave it a "glowing review". The magazine's writer, Gordon Gow, said that "the Harrison music replaces dialogue, waxing almost vocal like a cinema organist from the silent days." In his review for International Times, Barry Miles wrote:

A genius description and interpretation of how someone else is feeling. Their moods, loves, wants. A delicate light cobweb of music, Indian, Chinese, French Impressionist, Jingle-jangle piano, hot horn. The music of the '20s occurs throughout in evocative snatches ... Like Spike Jones and his City Slickers, only seen through the curtains of memories, parts of themes, incomplete lines. Then a '60s theme, a moving pattern of colours, bobbing the lilies on the pond.

Miles concluded by describing it as a "gentle human record". By contrast, Melody Maker's review read: "Heavily Indian-influenced music written, arranged and produced by George for the film. Much of the music fails to have much point away from the pictures."

Writing in February 1969, Geoffrey Cannon of The Guardian cited Wonderwall Music and recent individual projects by Lennon and McCartney for Apple as evidence that the three bandmates had "musical ideas which cannot be related to the Beatles". He added: "Playing these albums again and again, the threat of the Beatles' dissolution has become increasingly apparent to me." In his review of Harrison's 1969 experimental album, Electronic Sound, Ed Ward of Rolling Stone said that Wonderwall Music "clearly shows" Harrison to be a "consummate musician".

=== Retrospective assessment ===
==== Professional reviews ====
Professional ratings
Review scores
Source	Rating
AllMusic	2.5/5 stars
Billboard	"Vital Reissue"
Mojo	3/5 stars
MusicHound Rock	2/5 stars
OndaRock	5/10
The Rolling Stone Album Guide	2.5/5 stars
Uncut	3/5 stars

Musician said of the 1992 CD release: "Of all the Beatles-related esoterica, this 1968 soundtrack album is one of the choicest treasures ... a freewheeling tapestry of music and sound ... [and] a pastiche-like head trip with a mind all its own." Billboard's reviewer rated it a "Vital Reissue" (signifying a re-release or compilation that merits "special artistic, archival, and commercial interest") and described the album as an "often enchanting sequence of 19 harmonious themes and tone poems" and an "intriguing treat".

Writing for Rolling Stone in 2002, Mikal Gilmore described Wonderwall Music as "a soundtrack to a rarely seen film, though Harrison's music was inventive and the album remains among his best works". In the 2004 edition of The Rolling Stone Album Guide, however, Mac Randall gave the release two-and-a-half stars (out of five) and grouped it with Electronic Sound as being "interesting, though only for established fans". In a 2011 assessment for Mojo, John Harris said it was "As subtly inventive as you'd expect, though hardly compulsory." (Note: Rolling Stone included the album in its 2015 list titled "20 Terrible Debut Albums by Great Artists". Keith Harris said that the Indian selections "reduced a complex tradition to a collection of hip background sounds" and he concluded: "The best thing you can say about Wonderwall Music is that it's probably more historically significant than the LP of experimental twaddle John Lennon released a month later [Two Virgins].")

[As] a whole, it's a fascinating if musically slender mishmash of sounds from East and West, everything casually juxtaposed or superimposed without a care in the world ... As this and Harrison's second experimental release, Electronic Sound, undoubtedly proved, pigeonholing this Beatle was a dangerous thing.

— AllMusic critic Richard Ginell

In January 2012, Bryan Bierman of Magnet presented Wonderwall Music in the magazine's "Hidden Gems" series, lamenting that "the album has become an obscure piece of Beatles trivia instead of what it is: a fascinating experiment from one of popular music's most interesting figures." Bierman wrote that, while the Beatles held a familiar role as pioneers in rock music's new developments, the album showed Harrison breaking away and "creating fresh and unique sounds" of his own. In February 2011, the website Death and Taxes similarly identified the album as one of Harrison's two "Forgotten Solo Gems", along with Electronic Sound. (Note: Among the highlights, D.J. Pangburn cited "Red Lady Too" as indicative that Harrison was "every bit the psychedelic equal of Lennon", and "Drilling a Home" as revealing him to be "an astute musicologist and modern-day interpreter, surpassing even McCartney". Pangburn said that "Greasy Legs" could equally belong in a Wes Anderson film or on an album by Boards of Canada.)

Reviewing the 2014 Apple Years remaster for Uncut, Richard Williams writes that Wonderwall Music represents "an exploded diagram of a Beatles album", which includes "[d]reamy miniature ragas", "a pub knees-up gatecrashed by a Dixieland band ('Drilling A Home')" and "the bones of early acid-rock songs ('Red Lady Too' and 'Party Seacombe')". Williams describes the album as "a treat from start to finish" offering "an innocent optimism that will always be worth a listen". New Zealand Herald critic Graham Reid considers "Dream Scene" to be "by far the most psychedelic and out-there piece by any Beatle to that time", adding that "towards the end you can almost anticipate Lennon's Revolution 9 coming in." Reid describes the album as, variously, "peculiar and terrific" and "one of the most interesting and courageously different of [Harrison's] solo albums". In a review for Uncut's Ultimate Music Guide issue on Harrison, Jon Dale describes Wonderwall Music as "a beguiling, charming snapshot of a moment in time". He says that, in response to the soundtrack restrictions, Harrison skilfully abbreviates the Indian raga form, "somehow capturing an essence, and condensing it to the fleeting, the elemental", while similarly presenting Western experimentalism "cloaked in a velvet glove".

==== Biographers' appraisal ====
Author Robert Rodriguez writes that, although the brevity of each selection allowed little opportunity for progression beyond a basic motif, "sonically, the range explored even within the Western cues was astonishing". He adds: "The Indian cuts too were quite varied stylistically, showing open-minded listeners that there was more to the country's music than twanging sitars and thumping tablas." Simon Leng considers Wonderwall Music to be "a companion in spirit" to Bill Evans' Conversations with Myself, due to the doubling of the lead instrument in some of the Indian pieces; he comments on the significance of Harrison recording in India in January 1968: "There were now three Beatles who held firm artistic visions. The group was unraveling in earnest." Leng praises "Dream Scene" in particular, describing it as a "musical acid trip" that "rivals anything on Sgt. Pepper for sheer freak-out effect".

Ian Inglis views Wonderwall Music as "an assured and varied collection of music that ... perfectly complemented the juxtaposition of the exotic and the ordinary that Massot's film depicted". Among the selections he highlights as transcending their soundtrack role, Inglis describes "Microbes" as "a beautiful example of Harrison's ability to create forlorn, mournful, yearning soundscapes" and "Greasy Legs" as "a delicate and charming composition". Inglis concludes of Harrison's debut solo album: "it provides a fascinating summary of the myriad patterns of musical activity whose fusions stimulated the growth of psychedelic, underground, and progressive scenes in the late 1960s, and it is a key moment in the development of his preparations for life after the Beatles."

== Cultural influence and legacy ==
According to Dale, as the first solo release by a member of the band, Wonderwall Music is widely viewed as "the Marco Polo of Beatle solo albums", yet its true historical significance lies in its standing as "one of the first records to really bring Indian classical music into pop and rock, across the entire narrative of an album". Shambhu Das, who subsequently became a teacher and ambassador of Indian music in Canada, recognises the album as having helped inspire Indo–jazz fusion. American film-score composer Quincy Jones once described it as "the greatest soundtrack he had heard", according to Massot's recollection to BBC Radio presenter Spencer Leigh. (Note: For his part, Harrison was dismissive of the Western music on the album; in the 1980s he referred to it as "loads of horrible mellotron stuff and a police siren".)

Leng credits Wonderwall Music with having established Harrison as "a pioneer in fusing global music", and Madinger and Easter similarly view it as "an early example of what would eventually become known as 'World Music': the mixing of Western music with other types from around the globe". In his book The Dawn of Indian Music in the West, Peter Lavezzoli describes the album as "a charming potpourri of Indian and Western sounds"; he considers Harrison to be a principal figure in the introduction of Indian music to Western audiences, along with Yehudi Menuhin and John Coltrane, and groups him with Paul Simon, Peter Gabriel and Mickey Hart as the rock musicians most responsible for popularising world music. Writing for Mojo in 2011, Michael Simmons described Wonderwall Music as a "groundbreaking blend of Bombay and London", while Kevin Howlett comments in his 2014 liner-note essay that Harrison's decision to "travel to the source" and professionally record non-Western music was "unprecedented for a pop musician". Graeme Thomson, writing in The Guardian in March 2017, called Wonderwall Music "a world music crossover before such a notion even existed".

Clayson says that the album's influence was evident on mid-1990s Britpop acts such as Oasis, Supergrass and Ocean Colour Scene. Of these bands, Oasis took the title of their international hit "Wonderwall" from that of Harrison's album. (Note: In a 2001 interview, Massot said that his decision to re-release Wonderwall in the late 1990s was due to the interest generated through Oasis' hit song.) Like Clayson, music journalist Chris Ingham sees the most obvious example of Wonderwall Music's legacy in the raga rock sound of Kula Shaker, who also adopted lyrical influences from Harrison's work. The band's 1996 single "Govinda" was a cover of a Harrison-produced song by the Radha Krishna Temple, and its B-side, "Gokula", used an identical guitar riff to the one on "Ski-ing", resulting in a co-writing credit for Harrison. Crispian Mills reflected: "He allowed us a co-write for a piece of music he'd written with [Eric] Clapton for the Wonderwall soundtrack. We were playing this riff, and turned it into a song. Everyone said we wouldn't get permission because it was hallowed ground. We wrote to him, and he said: 'Yeah, it's cool. It's Eric's riff anyway.' We got it, and were thrilled. We have got a co-write with George, which is awesome.”The track "Ski-ing" was used as a walk-on song for Liam Gallagher and John Squire's 2024 tour.

== Track listing ==
All selections written by George Harrison, except where noted.

=== Original release ===
Side one

1. "Microbes" – 3:42
2. "Red Lady Too" – 1:56
3. "Tabla and Pakavaj" – 1:05
4. "In the Park" – 4:08
5. "Drilling a Home" – 3:08
6. "Guru Vandana" – 1:05
7. "Greasy Legs" – 1:28
8. "Ski-ing" – 1:50
9. "Gat Kirwani" – 1:15
10. "Dream Scene" – 5:26

Side two

1. "Party Seacombe" – 4:34
2. "Love Scene" – 4:17
3. "Crying" – 1:15
4. "Cowboy Music" – 1:29
5. "Fantasy Sequins" – 1:50
6. "On the Bed" – 2:22
7. "Glass Box" – 1:05
8. "Wonderwall to Be Here" – 1:25
9. "Singing Om" – 1:54

=== 2014 reissue ===
Track numbers 1 to 19 of the original release, with the following bonus tracks:

20. "In the First Place" (Colin Manley, Tony Ashton; performed by the Remo Four) – 3:17
21. "Almost Shankara" – 5:00
22. "The Inner Light" (alternate take, instrumental) – 3:43

== Personnel ==
- George Harrison – piano, Mellotron, electric and acoustic guitars, tape loops, musical arrangements; vocals ("Dream Scene", "Singing Om")
- John Barham – piano, flugelhorn, harmonium, orchestral arrangement
- Tony Ashton – tack piano, organ, Mellotron, piano, harmonium
- Colin Manley – electric and acoustic guitars, steel guitar
- Philip Rogers – bass guitar
- Roy Dyke – drums
- Tommy Reilly – harmonica
- Eric Clapton – electric guitar
- Ringo Starr – drums
- Big Jim Sullivan – bass guitar
- Aashish Khan – sarod
- Mahapurush Misra – tabla, pakhavaj
- Sharad Kumar – shehnai
- Hanuman Jadev – shehnai
- Shambhu Das – sitar
- Indranil Bhattacharya – sitar
- Shankar Ghosh – tabla
- Chandrashekhar Naringrekar – surbahar
- Shivkumar Sharma – santoor
- S.R. Kenkare – bansuri
- Vinayak Vora – tar shehnai
- Rijram Desad – harmonium, tabla tarang

== Charts ==
Chart (1968–69)	Position
Canadian RPM Top 50 Albums	39
US Billboard Top LPs	49
US Cash Box Top 100 Albums	39
US Record World Top LPs	33
West German Musikmarkt LP Hit-Parade	22

== See also ==
- Raga
- Shankar Family & Friends

== Sources ==
- Allison, Dale C. Jr. (2006), The Love There That's Sleeping: The Art and Spirituality of George Harrison, New York, NY: Continuum, ISBN 978-0-8264-1917-0.
- Badman, Keith (2001), The Beatles Diary Volume 2: After the Break-Up 1970–2001, London: Omnibus Press, ISBN 0-7119-8307-0.
- Brackett, Nathan; Hoard, Christian, eds. (2004), The New Rolling Stone Album Guide (4th ed.), New York, NY: Fireside/Simon & Schuster, ISBN 0-7432-0169-8.
- Castleman, Harry; Podrazik, Walter J. (1976), All Together Now: The First Complete Beatles Discography 1961–1975, New York, NY: Ballantine Books, ISBN 0-345-25680-8.
- Clayson, Alan (2003), George Harrison, London: Sanctuary, ISBN 1-86074-489-3.
- Doggett, Peter (2011), You Never Give Me Your Money: The Beatles After the Breakup, New York, NY: It Books, ISBN 978-0-06-177418-8.
- The Editors of Rolling Stone (2002), Harrison, New York, NY: Rolling Stone Press/Simon & Schuster, ISBN 0-7432-3581-9.
- Everett, Walter (1999), The Beatles as Musicians: Revolver Through the Anthology, New York, NY: Oxford University Press, ISBN 0-19-509553-7.
- Graff, Gary; Durchholz, Daniel, eds. (1999), MusicHound Rock: The Essential Album Guide, Farmington Hills, MI: Visible Ink Press, ISBN 1-57859-061-2.
- Greene, Joshua M. (2006), Here Comes the Sun: The Spiritual and Musical Journey of George Harrison, Hoboken, NJ: John Wiley & Sons, ISBN 978-0-470-12780-3.
- Harrison, Olivia (2011), George Harrison: Living in the Material World, New York, NY: Abrams, ISBN 978-1-4197-0220-4.
- Harry, Bill (2003), The George Harrison Encyclopedia, London: Virgin Books, ISBN 978-0-7535-0822-0.
- Howlett, Kevin (2014), "Wonderwall Music", Wonderwall Music (CD booklet), produced by George Harrison, Apple Records.
- Ingham, Chris (2006), The Rough Guide to the Beatles (2 ed.), London: Rough Guides/Penguin, ISBN 978-1-84836-525-4.
- Inglis, Ian (2010), The Words and Music of George Harrison, Santa Barbara, CA: Praeger, ISBN 978-0-313-37532-3.
- Lavezzoli, Peter (2006), The Dawn of Indian Music in the West, New York, NY: Continuum, ISBN 0-8264-2819-3.
- Leng, Simon (2006), While My Guitar Gently Weeps: The Music of George Harrison, Milwaukee, WI: Hal Leonard, ISBN 1-4234-0609-5.
- MacDonald, Ian (1998), Revolution in the Head: The Beatles' Records and the Sixties, London: Pimlico, ISBN 0-7126-6697-4.
- Madinger, Chip; Easter, Mark (2000), Eight Arms to Hold You: The Solo Beatles Compendium, Chesterfield, MO: 44.1 Productions, ISBN 0-615-11724-4.
- Miles, Barry (2001), The Beatles Diary Volume 1: The Beatles Years, London: Omnibus Press, ISBN 0-7119-8308-9.
- Mojo Special Limited Edition: 1000 Days of Revolution (The Beatles' Final Years – Jan 1, 1968 to Sept 27, 1970), London: Emap, 2003.
- Rodriguez, Robert (2010), Fab Four FAQ 2.0: The Beatles' Solo Years 1970–1980, Milwaukee, WI: Hal Leonard, ISBN 978-0-87930-968-8.
- Schaffner, Nicholas (1978), The Beatles Forever, New York, NY: McGraw-Hill, ISBN 0-07-055087-5.
- Schaffner, Nicholas (1982), The British Invasion: From the First Wave to the New Wave, New York, NY: McGraw-Hill, ISBN 0-07-055089-1.
- Simmons, Michael (November 2011), "Cry for a Shadow", Mojo, pp. 74–87.
- Spizer, Bruce (2005), The Beatles Solo on Apple Records, New Orleans, LA: 498 Productions, ISBN 0-9662649-5-9.
- Tillery, Gary (2011), Working Class Mystic: A Spiritual Biography of George Harrison, Wheaton, IL: Quest Books, ISBN 978-0-8356-0900-5.
- Winn, John C. (2009), That Magic Feeling: The Beatles' Recorded Legacy, Volume Two, 1966–1970, New York, NY: Three Rivers Press, ISBN 978-0-307-45239-9.
- World Music: The Rough Guide (Volume 2: Latin and North America, Caribbean, India, Asia and Pacific), London: Rough Guides/Penguin, 2000, ISBN 1-85828-636-0.
