= Paice Ashton Lord =

British rock band (1976–1978)

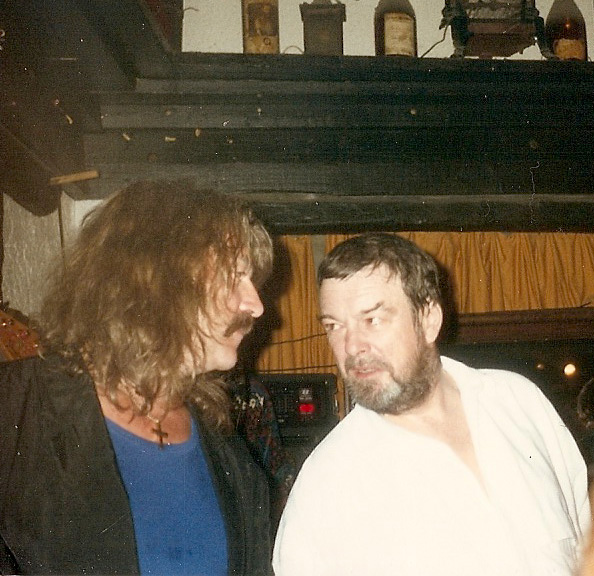
- Tony Ashton with Jon Lord, a gig at the Hotel Post, March 1990

Background information
- Also known as: PAL; Paice, Ashton & Lord
- Origin: England
- Genres: Hard rock; psychedelic rock; blues rock
- Years active: 1976–1978
- Label: Oyster (Polydor)
- Spinoffs: Whitesnake
- Spinoff of: Deep Purple
- Members: Ian Paice; Tony Ashton; Jon Lord; Bernie Marsden; Paul Martinez

Paice Ashton Lord was a short-lived British rock band featuring Deep Purple band members Ian Paice and Jon Lord with singer Tony Ashton. The band was formed in 1976, released its only album in 1977 and broke up in 1978.

== History ==
After Deep Purple broke up in 1976, drummer Ian Paice and keyboard player Jon Lord created a new band, Paice Ashton Lord, with friend Tony Ashton, a British keyboardist and singer of Ashton, Gardner and Dyke. After extensive auditions they chose Bernie Marsden to play electric guitar and Paul Martinez as the band's bassist.

Tony Ashton had previously played with Lord on the 1974 album First of the Big Bands and on Lord's Gemini Suite project in 1971, singing lead vocals on one track. He collaborated on Lord's solo work and Deep Purple bassist Roger Glover's solo projects.

Soon after Ashton broke his leg falling off a stage in the dark at a London concert, the group was wound up. Lord, Marsden and later Paice joined David Coverdale's band Whitesnake. Martinez joined Stan Webb's Chicken Shack for a short time, before joining John Otway for one album, and going on to play with Robert Plant. Later on, Paice played in Gary Moore's band, before he and Lord joined the re-formed Deep Purple in 1984.

Tony Ashton died of cancer on 28 May 2001. A memorial concert was held at the Buxton Opera House on 4 November that same year.

Jon Lord died of pancreatic cancer on 16 July 2012.

On 24 August 2023, Bernie Marsden died from bacterial meningitis.

Paul Martinez died in February 2024, at the age of 76. This left Ian Paice, as the only survivor from Paice Ashton Lord.

== Recordings ==
The band recorded their debut album Malice in Wonderland at Musicland Studios in Munich in September and October 1976. The record was released in February 1977. The music included elements of rhythm and blues, funk and soul, with several tracks featuring a brass section and backing vocals from Sheila and Jeanette McKinley. Despite some critical appreciation, the album was not a great commercial success. A second album was planned but was not released.

Film of the band recording the album in the studio was later released as Lifespan.

The band appeared on the BBC2 & BBC Radio 1 simulcast series "Sight And Sound: In Concert", in 1977, performing songs from "Malice In Wonderland", plus "The Ballad Of Mr. Giver", from Ashton & Lord's 1974 album, First of the Big Bands. This recording was later released, subsequently with a DVD.

An audiovisual recording of a 1977 Paice Ashton Lord concert in London was released on DVD in 2006.

In June 2000 Pete York and Jon Lord organised a testimonial concert for Tony Ashton at London's Abbey Road Studios to mark Ashton's apparent recovery from illness, named the 'Endangered Species Awards 2000'. 300 guests were invited and Tony Ashton was backed by artists including Lord, Paice, Marsden, Whitesnake's Neil Murray, Ringo Starr's son Zak Starkey and actor Ewan McGregor. A recording of 23 tracks from the event was released as 'Endangered Species' in 2009, featuring four Paice Ashton Lord songs.

Malice in Wonderland was re-released on CD in 2001 by Purple Records and 2019 by earMUSIC, each with an additional thirty minutes of songs intended for the unreleased second album. The earMUSIC release includes an extensive 24-page-booklet with new liner notes by Simon Robinson and previously unseen photos by Alan Messer. earMUSIC also re-released the album as 2LP gatefold.

== Discography ==
- 1977 Malice in Wonderland

Reissue 1995 (Repertoire Records), incl. three previously unreleased live tracks
Reissue 2001 (Purple Records), incl. eight previously unreleased studio recordings
Reissue 2019 (earMUSIC/Edel), incl. 24-page-booklet with liner notes and previously unreleased photos and eight remastered bonus tracks from the long-lost second album

- 1992 BBC Radio 1 Live in Concert / Live 1977

Recorded live on 10 March 1977 at the Golders Green Hippodrome, London, one song missing
Reissue 2012 (Hummingbird), remastered edition released as Live 1977, including previously missing song

- 2007 Paice Ashton Lord Live (DVD)

Recorded live on 10 March 1977 at the Golders Green Hippodrome, London, full recording

- 2009 Endangered Species (2CD+DCD)

Tony Ashton and friends, featuring Jon Lord, Ian Paice and Bernie Marsden, recorded live at Abbey Road in 2000. The album includes four songs by Paice Ashton Lord
