= Puppet Man (song) =

1970 song written by Neil Sedaka and Howard Greenfield

Single by The 5th Dimension

from the album Portrait
- B-side: "A Love Like Ours"
- Released: March 1970
- Genre: Soul
- Length: 2:58
- Label: Bell Records
- Songwriter: Sedaka-Greenfield
- Producer: Bones Howe

The 5th Dimension singles chronology
"The Girls' Song" (1970)	"Puppet Man" (1970)	"Save the Country" (1970)

"Puppet Man" is a song written by Neil Sedaka and Howard Greenfield. It was originally recorded by Sedaka on his 1969 Australian LP Workin' on a Groovy Thing, which saw a UK release under the title Sounds of Sedaka. In the UK, "Puppet Man" was released as the B-side of the single "Ebony Angel" on the MCA label

The first hit version was by The Fifth Dimension in 1970. The following year it was also a hit for Tom Jones.

The Fifth Dimension's original of "Puppet Man" reached #24 on the U.S. Billboard Hot 100 in the spring of 1970.

== Charts ==
Chart (1970)	Peak position
Australia (Kent Music Report)	19
Canada RPM Top Singles	31
U.S. Billboard Hot 100	24
U.S. Billboard Adult Contemporary	31
U.S. Cash Box Top 100	22

== Tom Jones version ==
"Puppet Man"

Single by Tom Jones

from the album Tom Jones Sings She's a Lady
- B-side: "Every Mile" "Resurrection Shuffle"
- Released: May 1971
- Recorded: 1970
- Genre: Pop
- Length: 2:53
- Label: Decca (UK), Parrot (US and Canada)
- Songwriter: Sedaka-Greenfield
- Producer: Gordon Mills

Tom Jones UK singles chronology
"She's a Lady" (1971)	"Puppet Man" (1971)	"Till" (1971)

Tom Jones' version was released the following spring. It reached No. 26 on the U.S. Billboard Hot 100, spending 10 weeks on the chart. For the first six weeks the single was backed with "Every Mile," then was changed to "Resurrection Shuffle", which also became a U.S. top 40 hit, reaching No. 38 and keeping the record on the charts an additional five weeks.

=== Charts ===
Chart (1971)	Peak position
Belgium (Ultratop 50 Flanders)	22
Belgium (Ultratop 50 Wallonia)	27
Canada RPM Top Singles	9
UK Singles (Official Charts)	49
US Billboard Hot 100	26
US Cash Box Top 100	14
West Germany (GfK)	36

== Other versions ==
A cover of the song was performed on The Muppet Show in 1980 by a Muppet version of Pinocchio playing into the literal lyrics of the song.
