= Kim Gardner =

English musician (1948–2001)

- Born: Christopher Gardner; 27 January 1948; Dulwich, London, England
- Died: 24 October 2001 (aged 53) Los Angeles, California, U.S.
- Instrument: Bass guitar
- Years active: 1960s–2001
- Formerly of: The Birds, The Creation, Ashton, Gardner & Dyke, Badger

Kim Gardner (27 January 1948 in Dulwich, London – 24 October 2001 in Los Angeles) was an English musician.

He was part of the British Invasion of the US during the 1960s, and recorded more than thirty albums during his music career.

== Early life ==
Kim Gardner and his neighbour Ronnie Wood shared a passion for both art and music. They began drawing and playing music together as teenagers in Yiewsley, England. From their late teens and onward, the focus was primarily on music.

== Career ==
While attending art college together in 1964 Gardner and Wood met Tony Munroe, Ali McKenzie and Pete McDaniels and formed The Thunderbirds. They were signed to Decca Records at the end of that year, and in 1965 released several singles, including "No Good Without You Baby" and "Leaving Here", after a name change from The Thunderbirds to The Birds.

In late 1965 the Birds left Decca to sign with Reaction Records, but Gardner and Wood quit the band and joined The Creation, a mod band popular in Europe, especially Germany. In 1967, Gardner recorded some tracks with Jon Lord, Ronnie Wood and Twink under the name Santa Barbara Machine Head, released on Blues Anytime Vol. 3. In 1968 at the dissolution of the Creation, Kim Gardner joined with Tony Ashton and Roy Dyke to form Ashton, Gardner & Dyke, a jazz-rock band.

By 1971 Ashton, Gardner & Dyke had a hit single "The Resurrection Shuffle". Their second album featured such guest performers as Eric Clapton and George Harrison. They disbanded shortly after producing a third album.

He was also a member of "Quiet Melon" with Rod Stewart.

Gardner moved to Los Angeles in 1974 and spent the rest of the 1970s as both a touring musician and session musician. During this time he played on twenty-seven albums for such artists as Bo Diddley and Eric Clapton. He toured with several bands including Pacific Gas & Electric.

In 1973, while recording an album with Jackie Lomax and George Harrison in New Orleans, Gardner met his future wife, Paula, a successful entrepreneur in the clothing business. They moved to Los Angeles in 1974, married and had three daughters, Eva, Ashlee and Camille.

In 1974 Gardner joined Badger as bassist, a group featuring Jackie Lomax on vocals with drummer Roy Dyke and keyboardist Tony Kaye (formerly of Yes) and guitarist Paul Pilnick (formerly of Stealers Wheel). The band released one record White Lady on the Epic label, produced by Allen Toussaint. Before the record was released Gardner and Lomax left the band to form White Lady, a short lived effort.

In 1982 Gardner opened a pub in Hollywood, The Cat & Fiddle pub at 2100 Laurel Canyon Boulevard. In 1985 the pub was relocated to 6530 Sunset Boulevard.

Gardner's passion for art was also revived during the 1980s and he became an accomplished painter, displaying lithographs of his artwork at the Cat and Fiddle.

In the mid 1980s Gardner was a member of Ian Wallace's Tea Bags group with Jackie Lomax, David Mansfield, Peter Banks and Graham Bell.

Gardner's last recording was a collaboration with Mitch Mitchell of the Jimi Hendrix Experience and Don Adey. There are several prominent guests featured on these recordings including Carmine Appice, Bruce Gary, Mick Taylor, Jackie Lomax, Brian Auger and Ivan Neville.

== Death ==
Gardner died of cancer on 24 October 2001. He was 53 years old.

== Partial filmography ==
- The Deadly Bees (1966) - Member of The Birds (uncredited)
