= Badger (band) =

British rock band

Badger were a British rock band from the early 1970s. The band was founded by keyboardist Tony Kaye after he left Yes, along with bassist and singer David Foster.

== Background ==
David Foster had been in the Warriors with Jon Anderson before Anderson co-founded Yes. Foster later worked with the band on their second album Time and a Word (1970). Kaye had worked on a solo project by Foster that was never released.

The pair found drummer Roy Dyke, formerly of Ashton, Gardner and Dyke, and Dyke suggested guitarist and vocalist Brian Parrish formerly of Parrish & Gurvitz which later became Frampton's Camel (after Parrish left P&G) on guitar. The new band began rehearsing in September 1972 and signed to Atlantic Records.

== One Live Badger (1973) ==
Badger's first release was the live album, One Live Badger, produced by Jon Anderson and Geoffrey Haslam, and was taken from a show opening for Yes at London's Rainbow Theatre. Five of the songs were co-written by the whole band, with a sixth by Parrish (initially written for Parrish & Gurvitz). The cover art was done by Roger Dean, the artist responsible for many of Yes's album covers, although Kaye left Yes before their partnership with Roger Dean.

=== Track listing ===
- Wheel Of Fortune 7:40
- Fountain 7:12
- Wind Of Change 7:00
- River 7:00
- The Preacher 3:35
- On The Way home 7:10

=== Personnel ===
- Tony Kaye; Hammond organ, piano, Minimoog, mellotron
- Brian Parrish : guitar, vocals
- David Foster : bass guitar, vocals
- Roy Dyke; drums

== White Lady (1974) ==
By 1974, the band had been reduced to Kaye and Dyke. They recruited bassist Kim Gardner, who had worked with Dyke in Ashton, Gardner and Dyke. Paul Pilnick, formerly of Stealers Wheel, joined on guitar, as did singer Jackie Lomax.

Lomax proceeded to turn them into the type of R&B/soul band he had used on his solo albums. The band became a vehicle for Lomax's songs and singing. During this period, they released one album, White Lady, on Epic Records, produced by Allen Toussaint. All ten songs were written or co-written by Lomax. Guests on the album included Jeff Beck (contributing a guitar solo to the title track).

However, before the album's release, the band had split into two factions, with Lomax and Gardner leading a short-lived band called White Lady, before Lomax returned to a solo career.

"White Lady" b/w "Don't Pull The Trigger" was released as a single in May 1974. The album was issued in June.

=== Track listing ===
- A Dream Of You 4:15
- Everybody Nobody 3'26
- Listen To Me 4:57
- Don't Pull The Trigger 4:06
- Just The Way It Goes 4:41
- White Lady 4:46
- Be With You 3:47
- Lord Who Give Me Life 3:04
- One More Dream To Hold 4:04
- The Hole Thing 6:10

=== Personnel ===
- Tony Kaye : keyboards, minimoog, mellotron
- Jackie Lomax : vocals, rhythm guitar
- Paul Pilnick : lead guitar
- Kim Gardner : bass guitar
- Roy Dyke : drums

=== Additional Musicians ===
- Jeff Beck lead guitar on "White Lady"
- Barry Bailey slide guitar on "Don't Pull The Trigger", "White Lady", "Be With You" and "Lord Who Give Me Life"
- Allen Toussaint horns, congas, piano, organ, background vocals
- Carl Blouin baritone saxophone, flute
- Alvin Thomas tenor saxophone
- Lester Caliste trumpet
- John Lango trombone
- Joan Harmon, Mercedes Davis, Teresipa Henry : background vocals
- Jessie Smith and Bobby Montgomery : background vocals on "Everybody Nobody" and "One More Dream To Hold"

== See also ==
- British rock
