= Before I Forget (Jon Lord album) =

Studio album by Jon Lord
- Released: 28 June 1982
- Recorded: September 1981; 17 February – 4 March 1982 at Britannia Row, London
- Genre: Folk-rock, rock
- Length: 39:23 (original LP); 1:16:07 (1994 and 1999 CD reissue); 51:20 (2012 CD reissue)
- Label: Harvest (original LP & 2012 CD reissue); RPM (1994 CD reissue); Purple (1999 CD reissue)
- Producer: Guy Bidmead, Jon Lord

Jon Lord chronology
Sarabande (1976)	Before I Forget (1982)	Pictured Within (1998)

Singles from Before I Forget
- 1. "Bach Onto This" Released: May 1982

Before I Forget is a 1982 album by Jon Lord, featuring a largely conventional eight-song line-up, no orchestra. The bulk of the songs are either mainstream rock tracks ("Hollywood Rock and Roll", "Chance on a Feeling") or, specifically on Side Two, a series of classical piano ballads sung by mother and daughter duo, Vicki Brown and Sam Brown (wife and daughter of entertainer Joe Brown) and vocalist Elmer Gantry. The album also features prolific session drummer (and National Youth Jazz Orchestra alumnus) Simon Phillips, Cozy Powell, Neil Murray, Simon Kirke, Boz Burrell, Mick Ralphs, and Tony Ashton. The album features a prominent use of synthesizers.

== Track listing ==
All songs written by Jon Lord, except for "Say It's Alright" written by Jon Lord and Elmer Gantry.

Side one

1. "Chance on a Feeling" – 4:06
2. "Tender Babes" (O Ye Tender Babes) (Thomas Tallis, arr. by Jon Lord) – 4:04
3. "Hollywood Rock And Roll – 4:06
4. "Bach Onto This" (Toccata and Fugue in D minor, BWV 565) (Johann Sebastian Bach, Jon Lord arr. by Jon Lord) – 7:59

Side two

5. "Before I Forget" – 5:04
6. "Say Its Alright" – 4:47
7. "Burntwood" – 4:00
8. "Where Are You?" – 5:00

RPM/Purple CD reissue bonus tracks (1994 and 1999)

9. "Going Home" – 4:03
10. "Pavane" (Maurice Ravel, arr. by Jon Lord) – 3:54
11. "Lady" – 5:31
12. "For a Friend" – 6:28
13. "Interview" – 16:43

Harvest CD reissue bonus track (2012)

11. "Bach Onto This" (7" single edit) – 4:03

== Personnel ==
- Jon Lord - piano, organ, keyboards, mini Moog
- Vicki Brown - lead (6, 11) and backing (1, 3, 5, 6) vocals
- Tony Ashton - lead vocals (3)
- Elmer Gantry - lead vocals (8)
- Sam Brown - backing vocals (1, 3, 5, 6)
- Bernie Marsden - guitar (1, 4), lead vocals (1)
- Mick Ralphs - guitar (3, 6, 9)
- Neil Murray - bass (1, 2, 4–7)
- Boz Burrell - bass (3, 9)
- Ian Paice - drums (1, 5)
- Simon Phillips - drums (4, 6)
- Cozy Powell - drums (2)
- Simon Kirke - drums (3, 9)

== Production notes ==
- Produced by Jon Lord
- Assisted by Guy Bidmead
- Engineered by Guy Bidmead
- Assistant engineer: Mike Johnson
- Mixed by Guy Bidmead and Mike Johnson
- Recorded at Britannia Row Studios, Sep 1981 and Feb-March 1982
