= Tar shehnai =

Indian musical instrument

The tar shehnai, also spelled tarshenai or sometimes tar shehanai, is an esraj (an Indian bowed instrument) whose sound is amplified by a metal horn attached to its sound board. The term is also used to refer to the horn itself. The horn of a phonograph has sometimes been used.

The instrument sounds similar to a violin or to a shehnai (an Indian reed instrument like an oboe or shawm). It is sometimes used instead of a shehnai when no shehnai player is available. The word tar means "stringed".

A tar shehnai played by Dakshinamohan Tagore is used in Satyajit Ray's film Pather Panchali to accompany the scene in which Harihar and Sarbajaya weep over the death of their daughter Durga. Ray said Tagore was "one of [the instrument's] best exponents", and that its high, "piercing" sound was "suggestive of grief".
