= Tony Ashton =

English musician (1946–2001)

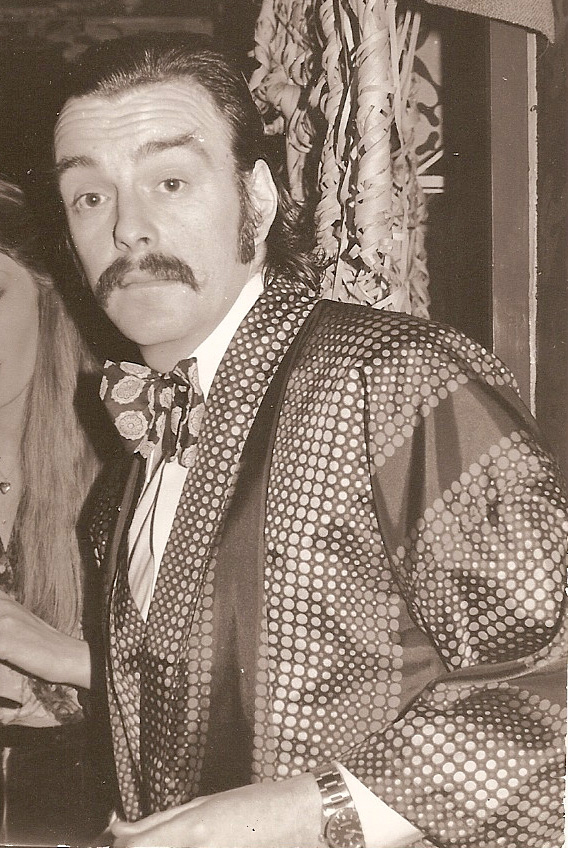
- Ashton at the Hotel Post, Zermatt, Switzerland on New Year's Eve, 1972

Background information
- Born: Edward Anthony Ashton; 1 March 1946; Blackburn, Lancashire, England
- Died: 28 May 2001 (aged 55) London, England
- Genres: Rock
- Occupations: Musician; singer; composer; record producer; artist
- Instruments: Piano; keyboards; vocals
- Years active: 1959–2001
- Formerly of: Ashton, Gardner and Dyke; Paice Ashton Lord; Family; the John Barry Seven; the Remo Four

Edward Anthony Ashton (1 March 1946 – 28 May 2001) was an English rock pianist, keyboardist, singer, record composer, producer and artist.

== Early life ==
Born in Blackburn, Lancashire, Ashton spent his formative years in the seaside town of Blackpool where his parents had an upright piano. When he was a child, his mother sent him to piano lessons. At the age of 13 in 1959, while Ashton was a student at St George's School, Blackpool, he joined a local group, the College Boys, on rhythm guitar and piano. When Ashton left school at the age of 15 he was already an accomplished pianist.

== Career ==
Ashton played in a jazz trio, the Tony Ashton Trio, with drummer John Laidlaw and bassist Pete Shelton in 1961 and 1962 at the Picador Club in Blackpool. Although his work began during the Beatles era, his roots lay firmly in soul, jazz and the blues. After playing with various Blackpool bands, Ashton was invited to join the Liverpool band the Remo Four as organist and vocalist. The band spent some time being the resident band at the Star Club in Hamburg; they followed this with a US tour accompanying the Beatles. They recorded some singles but their best work came in 1966 when they released their studio album Smile. Before they broke up in 1968 they backed George Harrison on his solo studio album Wonderwall Music (1968).

At the end of the 1960s Ashton formed a new group with Remo drummer Roy Dyke and bassist Kim Gardner. They called themselves Ashton, Gardner and Dyke. Their music, which was all composed by Ashton, was a fusion of R&B and jazz. The trio recorded three albums, but gained recognition in the United Kingdom in 1971, when the single "The Resurrection Shuffle" reached number three on the UK Singles Chart. Following this sudden success they failed to get any more hit singles and broke up in 1973. Ashton said: "The hit backfired on us and we ended up playing cabaret again. The best thing we did was playing with Herbie Mann at Ronnie Scott's. We wanted to be an album band, but once you've got a big hit, you're in the pop league."

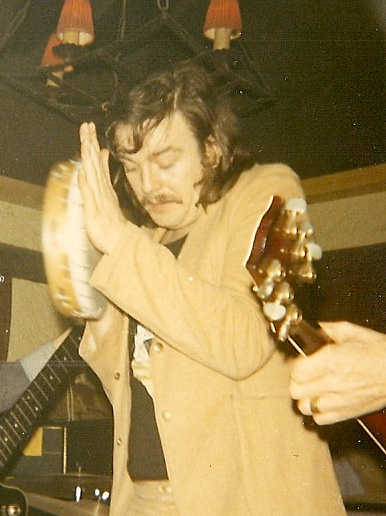
Ashton performing, 1971

Ashton also played with the Executives, the Mastersounds and on sessions with Jerry Lee Lewis, George Harrison, Eric Clapton and Paul McCartney. When Ashton, Gardner and Dyke broke up in 1973 Ashton briefly joined Family, and played a prominent role on the last Family studio album It's Only a Movie, sharing lead vocal duties with Roger Chapman on the title track and also on "Sweet Desiree".

Ashton met Deep Purple in the early 1970s, when the last recording of Ashton, Gardner and Dyke was a collaboration with keyboardist Jon Lord on the soundtrack for a B movie called The Last Rebel (1971). In the meantime, Ashton had appeared on Jon Lord's first solo studio album Gemini Suite in 1971. In 1973, Ashton joined the group Family for their last album and tour. That same year, he and David Coverdale and Glenn Hughes were guest vocalists on Jon Lord's live album Windows. Ashton and Lord became close friends. In the summer of 1974, during a break in Deep Purple's busy touring schedule, Ashton and Lord recorded their studio album First of the Big Bands (1975). This project was launched with a gig at the London Palladium the same year and the BBC taped a special live appearance at Golders Green Hippodrome in London. The album of this show combines rhythm and blues, boogie piano and Hammond organ with a big band. Ashton also contributed to Roger Glover's Butterfly Ball project. In these years, Ashton and Lord found a second home in Zermatt, an alpine resort in Switzerland, sometimes to ski, but more often to provide non-profit gigs in a unique complex (one hotel-two night-clubs-two restaurants and four pubs) called "Hotel Post" which was run by American-born Karl Ivarsson. Ashton managed to come to the place almost until his death, and Jon Lord was a regular visitor until his death even though the hotel did not exist anymore.

In August 1976, when Deep Purple broke up, Jon Lord and Ian Paice combined with Tony Ashton. The result was the formation of Paice Ashton Lord, a band rooted in funk, jazz and rock. The line-up was completed by future Whitesnake guitarist Bernie Marsden and bassist Paul Martinez. They recorded Malice in Wonderland in Munich and a nationwide tour of the UK was set in motion. The tour was cancelled while still in progress because of large financial losses. The band broke up leaving Ashton without a recording contract and poor prospects.

During the Eighties Ashton co-hosted a TV show with Rick Wakeman called GasTank. The show was aired every two weeks and, on each episode, there were guests ranging from Phil Lynott of Thin Lizzy to Ian Paice who sat in with the show's in-house band led by Ashton and Wakeman (others were Tony Fernandez and Chas Cronk). In between performances, the guests were interviewed by Wakeman. In 1984, Ashton was given a budget to record an album for EMI in Switzerland. The result was the album Live in the Studio, recorded in less than three days. After that, Ashton went through some hard times due to ill health and lack of work. Although he continued to perform sporadically, he did not release anything until 1988 with a single called "Saturday Night and Sunday Morning". In 1986, he married Sandra Naidoo and adopted her daughter Indira.

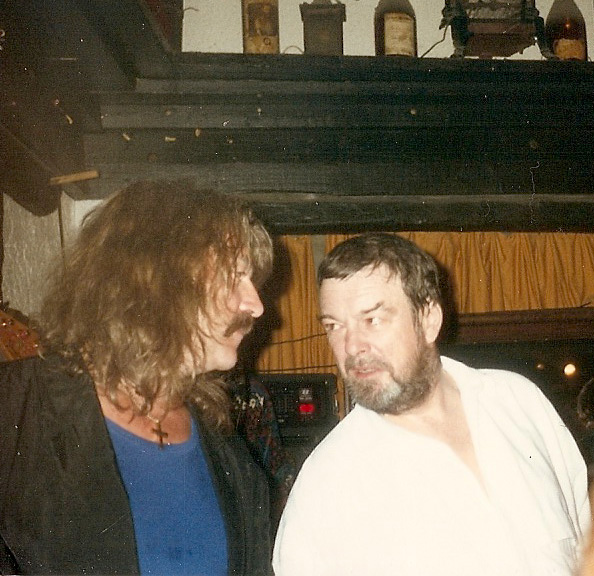
Tony Ashton and Jon Lord, 1990

== Final years ==
By the early 1990s, Ashton began to develop his second career as an artist. Many of Ashton's paintings were bought by the television presenter and DJ Chris Evans for exhibition at his art gallery, Well Hung, in Notting Hill. Apart from selling a lot of paintings (ink drawings and oil/acrylic), his work can be seen on the covers of various CDs, including his maxi-single Mr Ashton Sings Big Red and Other Love Songs. In 1996, Ashton played in some gigs in (Germany) and reunited with Bernie Marsden. Together they played at various Festivals (in Norway and in the UK).

In 2000, when he became seriously ill, a special benefit concert was recorded and filmed at EMI's Abbey Road Studios, featuring the many diverse talents of a number of Ashton's friends and colleagues over the years, including Jon Lord, Ian Paice, Micky Moody, Bernie Marsden, Howie Casey, Chris Barber, John Entwistle, Zak Starkey, Pete York, Zoot Money, Joe Brown, Geoff Emerick, Mike Figgis and Ewan McGregor. In the early nineties, Ashton also wrote the first of a planned trilogy of books, which has tales of various aspects of his career including Paice Ashton Lord, the GasTank TV series, and his love of Zermatt in Switzerland, which he first visited with Ashton, Gardner and Dyke in 1970, and which gave him the title for the book: Zermattitis: a Musicians' Guide to Going Downhill Fast. It has been recently published by Wymer Publishing, as a limited edition with a DVD of rare and previously unreleased film of Ashton, Gardner and Dyke, including a live performance from Montreux Jazz Festival 1970.

Ashton died from cancer on 28 May 2001 at his home in London at the age of 55.

== Discography ==
=== Albums ===
Year	Title	Artist(s)
1974	First of the Big Bands	Tony Ashton and Jon Lord
1977	Malice in Wonderland	Paice Ashton Lord
1984	Live in the Studio	

=== Live albums ===
Year Recorded	Title	Artist(s)
1992; 1977	BBC Live in Concert	Paice Ashton Lord
1993; 1974	BBC Live in Concert	Tony Ashton and Jon Lord
2006; 2000	Live at Abbey Road	Tony Ashton and Friends

==== Videos ====
Year Recorded	Title	Artist(s)
2007; 1977	Malice in Wonderland – Live	Paice Ashton Lord
2009; 2000	Endangered Species Live at Abbey Road – DVD	Tony Ashton and Friends
2011; 1970	Montreux Jazz Festival 1970	Ashton, Gardner and Dyke

=== Singles/EPs ===
Year	Title/Tracks	Artist(s)
1971	A: "You, Me and a Friend of Mine"; B: "I'm Dying for You"	
1972	A: "Surrender Me"; B: "Sloeback"	Ashton and Lord
1972	A: "Celebration"; B: "Sloeback"	Ashton and Lord
1974	A: "We're Gonna Make It"; B: "Band of the Salvation Army Band"	Ashton and Lord
1975	A: "The Resurrection Shuffle"; B: "Ballad of Mr. Giver"	Tony Ashton; Tony Ashton and Jon Lord
1976	A: "The Crezz"; B: "Sumthin' – Something"	
1983	A: "The Resurrection Shuffle"; B: "Gimme Some Time to Play"	Tony Ashton and Lynda Hayes
1988	A: "Saturday Night and Sunday Morning"; B: "Samedi Soir Dimanche Matin"	
1995	Big Red and Other Love Songs "Big Red" "Travelin Javelin" "Strange Day" "Travelin Javelin Reprise"	
1996	The Big Freedom Dance "The Big Freedom Dance" "Travelin Javelin"	

=== Session work/appearances ===
Year	Title	Artist(s)/Band	Notes
1971	Gemini Suite	Jon Lord with the London Symphony Orchestra	conductor: Sir Malcolm Arnold; vocals: Tony Ashton
1973	One & One Is One	Medicine Head	
1973	It's Only a Movie	Family	
1973	BBC Live in Concert	Family	keyboards and backing vocals: Tony Ashton
1973	Abyss	Jimmy Thomas	
1973	Rainbow	McGuinness Flint	
1973	If It Was So Simple	Longdancer	
1973	Rigor Mortis Sets In	John Entwistle	
1974	Windows	Jon Lord	Lead vocal: Tony Ashton
1974	Buzzard	Tucky Buzzard	
1974	Thru a Five	Medicine Head	
1974	The Butterfly Ball and the Grasshopper's Feast	Roger Glover and Guests	
1975	Mad Dog	John Entwistle	
1975	Broken Glass	Stan Webb	
1976	Wizard's Convention	Wizard's Convention	
1978	The Creeper	Stan Webb's Chicken Shack	
1979	Back to the Egg	Wings	Rockestra member on "Rockestra Theme" and "So Glad To See You"
1981	Roadie's Concerto	Chicken Shack	
1982	Before I Forget	Jon Lord	vocals: Tony Ashton
1985	Wind in the Willows	Eddie Hardin	
1991	My Way on the Highway	Guitar Shorty and Otis Grand	
1994	Unlucky Boy	Chicken Shack	
1995	Eddie Hardin's Wizard's Convention 2	Eddie Hardin and Friends	
1997	Eddie Hardin's Wizard's Convention 3	Eddie Hardin and Friends	
1999	The Masters: Wizard's Convention	Eddie Hardin/Wizard's Convention	
2006	Butterfly Ball – DVD	Roger Glover and Friends	
