= Windows (Jon Lord album) =

Live album by Jon Lord
- Released: September 1974
- Recorded: 1 June 1974
- Venue: Herkulessaal of the Munich Residenz, Germany
- Genre: Classical, Progressive rock
- Length: 48:47
- Label: Purple Records

Jon Lord chronology
Gemini Suite (1971)	Windows (1974)	Sarabande (1976)

Professional ratings
Review scores
Source	Rating
Allmusic	2/5 stars

Windows is a live album by Jon Lord and the German conductor and composer Eberhard Schoener. The music and the record are primarily credited to Lord. It was taped at a concert in Munich, (West) Germany on 1 June 1974 and the music is a mix between progressive rock and orchestral late romantic/modernist styles.

The piece on the first side, "Continuo on B-A-C-H" is a loose attempt to build on the unfinished triple fugue that closed Johann Sebastian Bach's "Art of the Fugue". The second side of the LP is a three-part composition called "Window". In the liner notes of the LP album Lord makes a comparison between the rhapsodic structure here and the renga tradition of chain composition of poetry in medieval Japan. The music of the middle section was lifted from Lord's earlier crossover effort Gemini Suite (1971).

Ray Fenwick, Tony Ashton, David Coverdale, Glenn Hughes and Lord himself perform as soloists along with the Munich Chamber Opera Orchestra conducted by Schoener. The album was released on LP by Purple Records (distributed by EMI) in September 1974 and reissued on CD (at least in West Germany) in 1987 by Line Records.

== Track listing ==
All compositions by Jon Lord and Eberhard Schoener

1. "Continuo On B.A.C.H." - 16:27
2. "Window" - 32:22
  1. "1st Movement - Renga"
  2. "2nd Movement - Gemini"
  3. "3rd Movement - Alla Marcia: Allegro"
- Catalog number of original LP: 1C 06295634

== Personnel ==
- The Orchestra of the Munich Chamber Opera conducted by Eberhard Schoener
- Jon Lord - piano, organ, ARP synthesizer
- David Coverdale - vocals
- Ray Fenwick - guitar
- Tony Ashton - piano, organ, vocals
- Glenn Hughes - bass, vocals
- Pete York - drums, percussion
- Eberhard Schoener - Moog synthesizer
- Ermina Santi, Sigune Von Osten - soprano vocals
- George Morrison - trumpet solo
- Gottfried Greiner - cello solo
- Gunter Salber - violin solo
