= Sarabande (album) =

Studio album by Jon Lord
- Released: October 1976
- Recorded: 3–6 September 1975
- Venue: Stadthalle, Oer-Erkenschwick
- Genre: Progressive rock, classical, jazz fusion, symphonic rock
- Label: Purple Records
- Producer: Jon Lord and Martin Birch

Jon Lord chronology
Windows (1974)	Sarabande (1976)	Before I Forget (1982)

Singles from Sarabande
- 1. "Bouree" Released: 27 August 1976

Professional ratings
Review scores
Source	Rating
Allmusic	link

Sarabande is the second solo album by Jon Lord recorded in September 1975 near Düsseldorf (Germany). The orchestra Philharmonia Hungarica was conducted by Eberhard Schoener.

The complete Sarabande suite was premiered in live performance in Budapest on 18 September 2010 and later in Sofia on 30 October and Essen on 15 November. Lord amended the 1975 orchestrations, and also orchestrated Aria, which was played on piano and synthesisers on the recording, and Caprice which was simply a group performance on record. 'Finale' was rearranged to allow the ‘parade of themes’ section (which was done with tape-loops on the recording) to be played live.

== Cover art ==
The cover shows the drawing of an ouroboros, a mythological snake, biting its own tail on which three naked women ride. The woman on the right stands in a position similar to the woman on the cover of Whitesnake's later Lovehunter album, on which Lord played. The original Jon Lord sleeve was designed by Kosh, and the illustration by Mike Bryan.

== Track listing ==
1. "Fantasia" – 3:30
2. "Sarabande" – 7:20
3. "Aria" – 3:42
4. "Gigue" – 11:06
5. "Bourée" – 11:00
6. "Pavane" – 7:35
7. "Caprice" – 3:12
8. "Finale" – 2:03

== Musicians ==
- Jon Lord - Hammond organ, piano, clavinet, synthesisers
- Andy Summers - Guitar
- Paul Karass - Bass guitar
- Pete York - Drums
- Mark Nauseef - Percussion
- The Philharmonia Hungarica directed by Eberhard Schoener

== Production notes ==
- Recorded 3–6 September 1975 at the Stadthalle Oer-Erkenschwick, near Düsseldorf, Germany with the Dieter Dierks Mobile Recording Studio, using Agfa P.E.M. 408 master tape
- Remixed by Martin Birch at Musicland Studios, Munich, Germany
- Assistant engineer: Hans Menzel
- Record mastered at Kendun Recorders, Burbank, California
- Produced by Jon Lord and Martin Birch
- Engineered by Martin Birch
- Technical advisor: Mike Phillips
- Project managed and overseen by Tony Edwards
