= The Birds (band) =

English band (1964–1967)

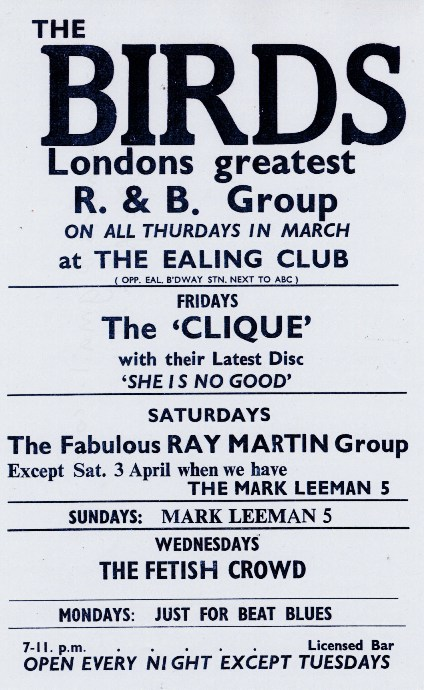
- Poster for the Birds at The Ealing Club, 1965

Background information
- Origin: London, England
- Genres: R&B, blues rock, freakbeat
- Years active: 1964–1967
- Labels: Decca, Reaction
- Past members: Ali McKenzie; Ronnie Wood; Tony Munroe; Kim Gardner; Bob Langham; Pete McDaniels; Richard Burkwood

The Birds were an English rhythm and blues band, formed in 1964 in London. They recorded fewer than a dozen songs and released only four singles.

Starting out with a hard R&B sound, they later began infusing it with Motown-style vocal harmonies. The best known former member of the Birds is Ronnie Wood playing lead guitar, who went on to join the Jeff Beck Group, the Creation, Faces and later the Rolling Stones.

== Career ==
Several members of the Birds grew up in the same neighbourhood in Yiewsley, Middlesex, and began playing together in 1964, while still in their teens. At first calling themselves the Thunderbirds, they started out playing local clubs and a neighbourhood community centre, but they soon expanded to a larger club circuit. When they were hired to play on the same bill as Chris Farlowe, whose back-up band was also called the Thunderbirds, they shortened their name to the Birds – a decision which would have significant ramifications later.

Their hard R&B sound was good enough to get them into a battle-of-the-bands contest held under the show Ready Steady Go!. When the band made their first television appearance, they caught the eye of Decca record company executives. The ensuing recording contract resulted in their first two singles, "You Don't Love Me" and "Leaving Here". The Birds seemed destined for stardom with their loud rhythm-and-blues based music, receiving equal billing with the Who at some concerts.

However, in the spring of 1965, the Los Angeles–based band the Byrds was dominating the UK Singles Chart with their folk-rock version of Bob Dylan's "Mr. Tambourine Man", released by the newly formed British CBS Records. When the Byrds arrived in England for their first British tour that summer, the Birds' manager, Leo de Clerck, took legal action to prevent them from using the name; the action failed, amid a flurry of national press and television coverage. The group parted ways with de Clerck soon afterwards.

After releasing the third Decca single in late 1965, the band moved to Reaction Records, whose director, Robert Stigwood, suggested they change their name to "Birds Birds", to distinguish themselves from the American band. In 1966, the band did an appearance in the horror film The Deadly Bees, performing their song "That's All I Need you For", and an excerpt from their recording of "How Can It Be" was featured in the 1966 British horror film The Psychopath. By 1967 the group had disbanded. Shindig! have described "How Can It Be" as "[condensing the band's] savage amped-up R&B into three minutes of ultra-compressed mod bravado." Both Gardner and Wood went on to join the Creation, with Gardner then joining Ashton, Gardner and Dyke.

In 2010, Ali McKenzie started to play gigs with the members of Small Fakers (a Small Faces tribute band), under the name the Birds. McKenzie died on 30 April 2021.

== Band members ==
- Ali McKenzie – Vocals, harmonica
- Ronnie Wood – Lead guitar, vocals
- Tony Munroe – Rhythm guitar, vocals
- Kim Gardner – Bass, vocals
- Bob Langham – Drums (1964)
- Pete McDaniels – Drums (1964–1966)

Session musician:

- Clem Cattini (drums on "Granny Rides Again", recorded in December 1966)

== Discography ==
=== Singles ===
- "You're on My Mind" (Ronnie Wood) / "You Don't Love Me (You Don't Care)" (Ellas McDaniel) (November 1964, Decca F 12031) (Producer: Franklyn Boyd)
- "Leaving Here" (Holland–Dozier–Holland) b/w "Next in Line" (Ronnie Wood) (April 1965, Decca F 12140) (Producer: Franklyn Boyd) – UK No. 45
- "No Good Without You Baby" (William Stevenson) / "How Can It Be?" (Ronnie Wood) (October 1965, Decca F 12257) (Producer: Franklyn Boyd)
- "Say Those Magic Words" (Bob Feldman, Doc Pomus, Jerry Goldstein, Mort Shuman, Richard Gottehrer) b/w "Daddy Daddy" (Ronnie Wood/Tony Munroe) (as "Birds Birds", September 1966, Reaction 591 005)
- "That's All That I Need You For" (Ronnie Wood, Tony Monroe, Ali MacKenzie) / "If I Were a Carpenter" (Tim Hardin) (February 2011, Birdsong Records ALI 001)

=== Other recorded songs ===
- "Good Times" / "La Poupée Qui Fait Non" (Michel Polnareff)
- "Granny Rides Again"
- "Run Run Run" (Pete Townshend)
- "That's All I Need You For" (Ronnie Wood/Tony Munroe)
- "You Shouldn't Do That" (Ronnie Wood)
- "What Hit Me" (Ronnie Wood/Tony Munroe)
- "N.S.U." (Jack Bruce)

=== Compilations ===
- The Collector's Guide to Rare British Birds – CD compilation album, released 20 June 2005, Deram Records
