= Gemini Suite =

Album by Jon Lord

Studio album by Jon Lord
- Released: October 1971
- Recorded: March 1971
- Studio: Abbey Road and De Lane Lea
- Genre: Classical, progressive rock
- Length: 47:45
- Label: Capitol Records

Jon Lord chronology
Gemini Suite (1971)	Windows (1974)

After the 1969 classical / rock fusion Concerto for Group and Orchestra, Jon Lord was commissioned to write a follow-up. This was Gemini Suite, five long movements inspired by the members of Deep Purple, and performed live in September 1970 at the Royal Festival Hall with The Light Music Society Orchestra (the album of the concert was issued in 1993 as Gemini Suite Live). Jon Lord then recorded it in the studio as his first solo project in 1971, with the London Symphony Orchestra conducted by Malcolm Arnold and soloists drawn from the rock world. Gemini Suite was an important step for Lord and led to albums such as Windows (1974) and Sarabande (1976).

The album was originally released in Europe and America in 1971 with different cover artwork. The 1973 US reissue featured a third version of the cover artwork. In 1983 the album was re-released on LP in Germany and four years later also for the first time on CD. The digital remastered version of the album premiered on CD in 2008.

== Studio album track listing ==
1. "Guitar" - Soloist: Albert Lee
2. "Piano" - Soloist: Jon Lord
3. "Drums" - Soloist: Ian Paice
4. "Vocals" - Soloist: Yvonne Elliman and Tony Ashton
5. "Bass guitar" - Soloist: Roger Glover
6. "Organ" - Soloist: Jon Lord

== Musicians ==
- Jon Lord: piano, organ
- Tony Ashton: vocals
- Yvonne Elliman: vocals
- Albert Lee: guitar
- Roger Glover: bass
- Ian Paice: drums
- London Symphony Orchestra conducted by Sir Malcolm Arnold

== Charts ==
Chart (1972)	Peak position
Australia (Kent Music Report)	42

== Production notes ==
- Composed and scored by Jon Lord
- Lyrics by Jon Lord
- Recorded at Abbey Road and De Lane Lea studios, London, March 1971
- Studio engineers: Mike Gray, Philip McDonald, Dave Stock
- Mixed by Martin Birch
- (2008 release) Tape archiving, sound restoration and digital remastering: Nick Watson, Fluid Studio
