= Wonderwall (film) =

1968 British film by Joe Massot

- Theatrical release poster
- Directed by: Joe Massot
- Screenplay by: G. Caín
- Story by: Gérard Brach
- Produced by: Andrew Braunsberg
- Starring: Jack MacGowran; Jane Birkin; Irene Handl; Richard Wattis; Iain Quarrier
- Cinematography: Harry Waxman
- Edited by: Rusty Coppleman
- Music by: George Harrison
- Production company: Alan Clore Films
- Distributed by: Compton-Cameo Films
- Release dates: 17 May 1968 (Cannes); 12 January 1969 (United Kingdom)
- Running time: 85 minutes
- Country: United Kingdom
- Language: English

Wonderwall is a 1968 British psychedelic film directed by Joe Massot (in his feature directorial debut) and starring Jack MacGowran, Jane Birkin, Irene Handl, Richard Wattis and Iain Quarrier, with a cameo by Dutch collective the Fool, who were also set designers for the film. The screenplay was by G. Cain from a story by Gérard Brach.

The soundtrack was composed by George Harrison and released as Wonderwall Music.

== Plot ==
Professor Oscar Collins is an eccentric middle-aged scientist who lives a reclusive life in a London flat. His next-door neighbour, a young model named Penny Lane, lives with her boyfriend, a photographer, in a brightly coloured flat. One evening, Collins is disturbed by sitar music coming from Penny's flat and discovers a hole in his wall through which he observes Penny modelling for a photo shoot. The following day, Collins again spies on Penny through the hole as she continues to model for photo shoots, prompting him to drill more holes in the wall.

Collins becomes increasingly obsessed with Penny, to the point of feigning illness and taking time off work so he can spend all his time spying on her. Penny begins to appear in Collins's dreams and fantasies, which become increasingly surreal and bizarre; when he imagines her in his own flat, he cannot get close to her because of an invisible wall separating them. As Collins's co-workers become worried about him, he is visited by one his co-workers, Perkins, but Collins turns him away, claiming he has contracted a new strain of measles and that he has been conducting experiments. Collins imagines himself and Penny as a couple getting married.

Collins is thrilled when Penny's boyfriend breaks up with her. Dressed as a magician, he sneaks into her flat and quickly hides in a closet when Penny comes home. The distraught young woman turns on the gas stove, swallows a handful of pills and lies down in her bed. Collins turns off the gas and enjoys a moment alone with Penny, finally being able to touch her, but he soon realises the seriousness of the situation and runs off to get help before performing CPR on her. Penny is taken to the hospital.

The next day, Collins is praised in the newspaper for saving Penny's life, and he returns to work. His co-workers congratulate him, and when he looks into his microscope, he sees Penny floating in space in a wedding dress, drifting into infinity.

== Cast ==
- Jack MacGowran as Professor Oscar Collins
- Jane Birkin as Penny Lane
- Richard Wattis as Perkins
- Irene Handl as Mrs Peurofoy
- Iain Quarrier as young man
- Beatrix Lehmann as mother
- Brian Walsh as photographer
- Sean Lynch as Riley
- Bee Duffell as Mrs Charmer
- Noel Trevarthen as policeman
- Suki Potier as woman at party (uncredited)
- Amanda Lear as woman at party (uncredited)
- Anita Pallenberg woman at party (uncredited)

== Release ==
The film premiered at the Cannes Film Festival on 17 May 1968, with George Harrison, his wife Pattie Boyd, Ringo Starr, his wife Maureen Cox, and the cast members of the film in attendance. The premiere in London was on 12 January 1969. The film won an award, but did not gain a proper distribution deal. A print finally appeared on the American midnight movies circuit in the 1970s, and on home video in the 1980s and 1990s, all of rather low technical quality.

In 1998, 30 years after the film's release, and with Massot an established film director, he decided to restore and re-release his first film. Harrison's search for master recordings turned up a lyrical song, "In the First Place" by the Remo Four, which he had not submitted the first time around, believing Massot wanted only instrumental music. "In the First Place" was released as a single in 1999. Harrison is believed to have not only produced it, but also sung and played on it, although he asked to be credited only as producer. Massot was happy to include the song in the restored film, which got a distribution deal.

The restored version of Wonderwall, both in theatrical and director's cut versions, is available on Blu-ray and DVD through Shout! Factory in the United States, with bonus features.

== Critical reception ==
The Monthly Film Bulletin wrote: "Skeletally, there is an idea here that might have worked – an idea, conceivably, for Polanski, Gerard Brach's usual collaborator. The treatment here, though, is almost wilfully self-destructive. On one side of the wall, there is Oscar living the standard farce life of the absent-minded professor, complete with quaint char Irene Handl and timid assistant Richard Wattis. On the other side loom the usual inert Swinging London fantasies – pop colours, art nouveau, Oriental bric-a-brac, Oriental Beatle music, a kind of bargain basement of pop. Assheton Gorton's sets have possibilities, particularly the jumbled accumulation of the ages in Oscar's flat and the vaguely pre-Raphaelite legends around the walls. But all this dated modishness is treated as though its mere presence were enough, so that the effect is a jangle of self-indulgent whimsy."

Budd Wilkins, writing for Slant Magazine, criticized the "slender-to-the-edge-of-nonexistent narrative" and "hopelessly square" underlying point, but enjoyed the film overall, saying it was "best taken for the sensory provocation of its eye-popping set designs and the spaced-out world music ambience of its soundtrack" in his 3.5/5 star review.

Keith Phipps, reviewing the film for The Dissolve, wrote "The film is mostly just an excuse to experiment. And while not all the experiments work out, the film remains a charming relic of a bygone era of light shows, sitar sounds, and over-the-top symbolism." On the review aggregator website Rotten Tomatoes, 80% of 5 critics' reviews are positive.
