= The Last Rebel (1971 film) =

1971 American western TV film

- Film poster
- Screenplay by: Warren Kiefer (credited as Lorenzo Sabatini)
- Story by: Warren Kiefer (credited as Lorenzo Sabatini); Rea Redifer
- Directed by: Larry G. Spangler (credited as Denys McCoy)
- Starring: Joe Namath
- Music by: Tony Ashton; Jon Lord
- Country of origin: United States
- Original language: English

Production
- Producer: Larry G. Spangler
- Cinematography: Carlo Carlini
- Editor: Frederick Muller
- Running time: 90 minutes
- Production companies: Glendenning; Orten; Spangler; U.S. Captail

Original release
- Release: August 9, 1971

The Last Rebel is a 1971 American Technicolor Western television film, directed by Larry G. Spangler (as Denys McCoy) and starring Joe Namath.

== Plot ==
Set in 1865 in southwest Missouri, at the close of the Civil War, the film follows the adventures of two Confederate men and a black man, whom they rescue from a lynching.

== Cast ==
- Joe Namath as "Captain" Hollis
- Jack Elam as Matt
- Woody Strode as Duncan
- Ty Hardin as The Sheriff
- Victoria George as Pearl
- Renato Romano as Deputy Virgil
- Marina Coffa as Camelia
- Annamaria Chio as Madam Dupres
- Mike Forrest as Cowboy
- Bruce Eweka as The Black Boy
- Jessica Dublin as Ruby, Pearl's partner
- Larry Laurence as Bedroom Man
- Sebastian Segriff as Union Officer
- Al Hassan as Al the Badman
- Art Johnson as Tall Soldier
- Paul Sheriff as Old Soldier
- Troy Patterson as 1st Rancher
- Rick Wells as 2nd Rancher
- Dominic Barto as Stagecoach Agent
- James Garbo as Deputy
- Tomas Rudy as Deputy
