= Joe Massot =

American film director (1933–2002)

- Born: 1933; United States
- Died: April 4, 2002 (aged 68–69); United States
- Occupations: Writer, film director

Joe Massot (1933 – April 4, 2002) was an American writer and film director who was known for the film Wonderwall (1968) which featured a soundtrack by George Harrison, and the Led Zeppelin concert film The Song Remains The Same (1976). The latter was not finished by Massot, being completed by Peter Clifton after the producer was unhappy with progress and removed Massot from the project. Massot's only other concert film was the 1980s ska film Dance Craze.

Other films Massot directed include Space Riders and Reflections on Love (1966), which was nominated as the best short film at the Cannes Film Festival. He is given writing credit on Space Riders, co-writing credit with The Firesign Theatre on Zachariah, and the George Lazenby film Universal Soldier.

Around Christmas 1985, Massot produced Slim Gaillard's Latin album Siboney, recorded at Gateway Studios in Battersea, London.
