= The Resurrection Shuffle =

1970 single by Ashton, Gardner and Dyke

Single by Ashton, Gardner and Dyke
- B-side: "Hymn to Everyone"
- Released: 20 November 1970
- Studio: De Lane Lea, London
- Genre: Blues rock
- Length: 3:17
- Label: Capitol
- Songwriter: Tony Ashton
- Producer: Tony Ashton

Ashton, Gardner and Dyke singles chronology
"Maiden Voyage" (1969)	"The Resurrection Shuffle" (1970)	"Can You Get It" (1971)

"The Resurrection Shuffle" is a song by British rock band Ashton, Gardner and Dyke, released as a single in November 1970. It became their only charting hit, peaking at number three on the UK Singles Chart and number 40 on the Billboard Hot 100.

== Background ==
"The Resurrection Shuffle" was recorded at De Lane Lea Studios on Dean Street in London and features Howie Casey playing saxophone.

Capitol decided to release this as a single over the song "I'm Your Spiritual Breadman" (featuring George Harrison playing guitar, assisting with production and helping with some of the lyrics), which had been scheduled for single release. However, the record label Capitol instead decided that "The Resurrection Shuffle" should be the next single.

Ashton, Gardner and Dyke went on tour with Deep Purple and shortly after this began, "The Resurrection Shuffle" was released as a single in November 1970. Within a few months, the single had gained significant popularity and by February the band were forced to leave the tour and to headline their own tour.

== Charts ==
Chart (1971)	Peak position
Australia (Go-Set)	13
Australia (Kent Music Report)	16
Belgium (Ultratop 50 Flanders)	28
Belgium (Ultratop 50 Wallonia)	35
Canada Top Singles (RPM)	22
Germany (GfK)	22
Ireland (IRMA)	6
Malaysia (Rediffusion)	1
Netherlands (Dutch Top 40)	27
Netherlands (Single Top 100)	25
UK Singles (Official Charts)	3
US Billboard Hot 100	40
US Cash Box Top 100	37

== Tom Jones version ==
"Resurrection Shuffle"
- Cover of the single released in France

Single by Tom Jones

from the album She's a Lady
- B-side: "Puppet Man"
- Released: June 1971
- Studio: Wessex Sound, London
- Length: 2:56
- Label: Parrot
- Songwriter: Tony Ashton
- Producer: Gordon Mills

Tom Jones singles chronology
"Puppet Man" (1971)	"Resurrection Shuffle" (1971)	"Till" (1971)

Welsh singer Tom Jones covered the song for his album She's a Lady, released in May 1971. Following the album's release in the US, "Resurrection Shuffle" was positively received and the record label, Parrot, decided to release it as a single, coupled with his current hit "Puppet Man", which had been released the previous month. "Resurrection Shuffle" was also released as a single in continental Europe with the B-side "Ebb Tide", and performed particularly well in France, where the single sold over 60,000 copies.

=== Charts ===
Chart (1971)	Peak position
Belgium (Ultratop 50 Wallonia)	16
Canada Top Singles (RPM)	35
US Billboard Hot 100	38
US Cash Box Top 100	40
