= The Finer Things (Steve Winwood album) =

Box set by Steve Winwood
- Released: 21 March 1995
- Recorded: 1964–1990
- Genre: Blue-eyed soul Rock; Blues-rock; Psychedelic rock Jazz
- Label: Island

Steve Winwood chronology
Far from Home (1994)	The Finer Things (1995)	Junction Seven (1997)

Professional ratings
Review scores
Source	Rating
AllMusic	4.5/5 stars
Pottsville Republican	(favourable)
The Plain Dealer	(favourable)
The Guardian	3/5 stars
The Birmingham Post	(favourable)
Stafford Post	7/10 stars
The Mail	6/10 stars
Los Angeles Times	2.5/4 stars
MusicHound Rock	5/5 stars

The Finer Things is a box set of recordings by Steve Winwood. It includes songs from his early days with The Spencer Davis Group through Traffic, Blind Faith and into his solo career.

== Background ==
The Finer Things was compiled by Peter Levinson, who at the time of its release was manager of catalogue development for PolyGram Records. Levinson said that he modelled the box set after Eric Clapton's Crossroads, which had been released in 1988. Island Records vice-president of marketing Matt Stringer, upon the box set's release, said that

We evaluate our catalog on a periodic basis to identify anything that is legitimately of value to the consumer and can be presented in a new or impressive or significant way, and this [The Finer Things] was certainly one of the projects that deserved to exist.

Winwood himself would take no part in the release or promotion of The Finer Things, with most of the liner notes based upon interviews with his Traffic-era producer Jimmy Miller. It is believed Winwood did approve of the project and that he spent the eight months before its release approving every step of its compiling.

Because the project was compiled before the release of Winwood's then-latest recording, Traffic's 1994 comeback album Far from Home, no songs from that album were included and the most recent recording dates from 1990. There were only a few rarities contained within the four discs of the box set – the most significant being two tracks from the "Eric Clapton and the Powerhouse" project from 1966.

== Track listing ==
Disc One
No.	Title	Writer(s)	Originally released	Length
1.	"Dimples" (Spencer Davis Group)	James Bracken/John Lee Hooker	Their First LP (1965)	2:19
2.	"I Can't Stand It" (Spencer Davis Group)	Steve McAllister	Their First LP (1965)	2:08
3.	"Every Little Bit Hurts" (Spencer Davis Group)	Ed Cobb	Their First LP (1965)	3:29
4.	"Strong Love" (Spencer Davis Group)	Mary Brown/Deadric Malone/Ed Silvers	The Second Album (1966)	2:13
5.	"Keep On Running" (Spencer Davis Group)	Jackie Edwards	The Second Album (1966)	2:45
6.	"Somebody Help Me" (Spencer Davis Group)	Jackie Edwards	The Second Album (1966)	2:01
7.	"When I Come Home" (Spencer Davis Group)	Jackie Edwards/Scott McKnight/Steve Winwood	Autumn '66 (1967)	1:57
8.	"I Want to Know" (Eric Clapton and the Powerhouse)	Sheila MacLeod	What's Shakin' (1966)	2:14
9.	"Crossroads" (Eric Clapton and the Powerhouse)	Robert Johnson	What's Shakin (1966)	2:16
10.	"Gimme Some Lovin" (Spencer Davis Group)	Spencer Davis/Muff Winwood/Steve Winwood	Gimme Some Lovin' (1967)	2:56
11.	"I'm a Man" (Spencer Davis Group)	Steve Winwood/Jimmy Miller	I'm a Man (1967)	2:55
12.	"Paper Sun" (Traffic)	Steve Winwood/Jim Capaldi	Mr. Fantasy (1967) (Note: Only included on the US version of Mr. Fantasy, though added to a 2000 reissue)	4:14
13.	"Dealer" (Traffic)	Steve Winwood/Jim Capaldi	Mr. Fantasy (1967)	3:11
14.	"Coloured Rain" (Traffic)	Steve Winwood/Jim Capaldi/Chris Wood	Mr. Fantasy (1967)	2:42
15.	"No Face, No Name, No Number" (Traffic)	Steve Winwood/Jim Capaldi	Mr. Fantasy (1967)	3:32
16.	"Heaven Is in Your Mind" (Traffic)	Steve Winwood/Jim Capaldi/Chris Wood	Mr. Fantasy (1967)	4:16
17.	"Smiling Phases" (Traffic)	Steve Winwood/Jim Capaldi/Chris Wood	Mr. Fantasy (1967)	2:40
18.	"Dear Mr. Fantasy" (Traffic)	Steve Winwood/Jim Capaldi/Chris Wood	Mr. Fantasy (1967)	5:38
19.	"Pearly Queen" (Traffic)	Steve Winwood/Jim Capaldi	Traffic (1968)	4:18
20.	"(Roamin' Thro' the Gloamin' With) 40,000 Headman" (Traffic)	Steve Winwood/Jim Capaldi	Traffic (1968)	3:13
21.	"No Time to Live" (Traffic)	Steve Winwood/Jim Capaldi	Traffic (1968)	5:19
22.	"Shanghai Noodle Factory" (Traffic)	Steve Winwood/Jim Capaldi/Chris Wood/Jimmy Miller/Larry Fallon	B-side of "Medicated Goo" single (Note: Included on 2005 reissue of Traffic.)	5:03
23.	"Medicated Goo" (Traffic)	Steve Winwood/Jimmy Miller	A-side of 1968 single	3:34
24.	"Withering Tree" (Traffic)	Steve Winwood/Jim Capaldi	B-side of "Feelin' Alright?" single (1968)	3:03

Disc Two
No.	Title	Writer(s)	Originally released	Length
1.	"Had to Cry Today" (Blind Faith)	Steve Winwood	Blind Faith (1969)	8:47
2.	"Can't Find My Way Home" (Blind Faith)	Steve Winwood	Blind Faith (1969)	5:40
3.	"Sea of Joy" (Blind Faith)	Steve Winwood	Blind Faith (1969)	5:22
4.	"Sleeping in the Ground [Live]" (Blind Faith)	Sam Myers	Previously unreleased (Note: Would ultimately be released in 2005 as part of London Hyde Park 1969)	4:33
5.	"Under My Thumb [Live]" (Blind Faith)	Mick Jagger/Keith Richards	Previously unreleased	5:48
6.	"Stranger to Himself" (Traffic)	Steve Winwood/Jim Capaldi	John Barleycorn Must Die (1970)	3:52
7.	"John Barleycorn" (Traffic)	Traditional/Steve Winwood	John Barleycorn Must Die (1970)	6:22
8.	"Glad" (Traffic)	Steve Winwood	John Barleycorn Must Die (1970)	6:58
9.	"Freedom Rider" (Traffic)	Steve Winwood/Jim Capaldi	John Barleycorn Must Die (1970)	5:26
10.	"Empty Pages" (Traffic)	Steve Winwood/Jim Capaldi	John Barleycorn Must Die (1970)	4:33
11.	"The Low Spark of High Heeled Boys" (Traffic)	Steve Winwood/Jim Capaldi	The Low Spark of High Heeled Boys (1971)	11:51
12.	"Rainmaker" (Traffic)	Steve Winwood/Jim Capaldi	The Low Spark of High Heeled Boys (1971)	7:51

Disc three
No.	Title	Writer(s)	Originally released	Length
1.	"Shoot Out at Fantasy Factory" (Traffic)	Steve Winwood/Jim Capaldi	Shoot Out at the Fantasy Factory (1973)	6:00
2.	"(Sometimes I Feel So) Uninspired [Live]" (Traffic)	Steve Winwood/Jim Capaldi	Shoot Out at the Fantasy Factory (1973)	10:30
3.	"Happy Vibes" (Steve Winwood, Remi Kabaka, Abdul Lasisi Amao)	Remi Kabaka	Previously unreleased version	4:53
4.	"Something New" (Traffic)	Steve Winwood/Jim Capaldi/Pat DiNizio	When the Eagle Flies (1974)	3:15
5.	"Dream Gerrard" (Traffic)	Steve Winwood/Vivian Stanshall	When the Eagle Flies (1974)	11:01
6.	"Walking in the Wind" (Traffic)	Steve Winwood/Jim Capaldi	When the Eagle Flies (1974)	6:53
7.	"When the Eagle Flies" (Traffic)	Steve Winwood/Jim Capaldi	When the Eagle Flies (1974)	4:24
8.	"Winner/Loser" (Stomu Yamashta's GO)	Steve Winwood	GO (1976)	4:17
9.	"Crossing the Line [Live]" (Stomu Yamashta's GO)	Michael Quartermain/Stomu Yamashta	GO Live from Paris (1976)	7:46
10.	"Hold On"	Steve Winwood/Jim Capaldi	Steve Winwood (1977)	4:31
11.	"Time Is Running Out"	Steve Winwood/Jim Capaldi	Steve Winwood (1977)	6:38
12.	"Vacant Chair"	Steve Winwood/Vivian Stanshall	Steve Winwood (1977)	6:55

Disc Four
No.	Title	Writer(s)	Originally released	Length
1.	"While You See a Chance"	Steve Winwood/Will Jennings	Arc of a Diver (1980)	5:15
2.	"Arc of a Diver"	Steve Winwood/Vivian Stanshall	Arc of a Diver (1980)	5:27
3.	"Spanish Dancer"	Steve Winwood/Will Jennings	Arc of a Diver (1980)	6:00
4.	"Night Train"	Duke Ellington/Steve Winwood/Will Jennings	Arc of a Diver (1980)	7:50
5.	"Dust"	Steve Winwood/George Fleming	Arc of a Diver (1980)	6:20
6.	"Valerie"	Steve Winwood/Will Jennings	Talking Back to the Night (1982)	4:07
7.	"Talking Back to the Night"	Steve Winwood/Will Jennings	Talking Back to the Night (1982)	5:45
8.	"Your Silence Is Your Song"	Steve Winwood/Will Jennings	Talking Back to the Night (1982)	5:15
9.	"Higher Love"	Steve Winwood/Will Jennings	Back in the High Life (1986)	5:47
10.	"Freedom Overspill"	Steve Winwood/George Fleming/Jake Hooker	Back in the High Life (1986)	4:15
11.	"Back in the High Life Again"	Steve Winwood/Will Jennings	Back in the High Life (1986)	4:22
12.	"The Finer Things"	Steve Winwood/Will Jennings	Back in the High Life (1986)	4:11
13.	"Roll with It"	Steve Winwood/Will Jennings	Roll with It (1988)	4:30
14.	"Don't You Know What the Night Can Do?"	Steve Winwood/Will Jennings	Roll with It (1988)	4:30
15.	"One and Only Man"	Steve Winwood/Jim Capaldi	Refugees of the Heart (1990)	4:39
