= The Spencer Davis Group discography =

Discography of English band The Spencer Davis Group

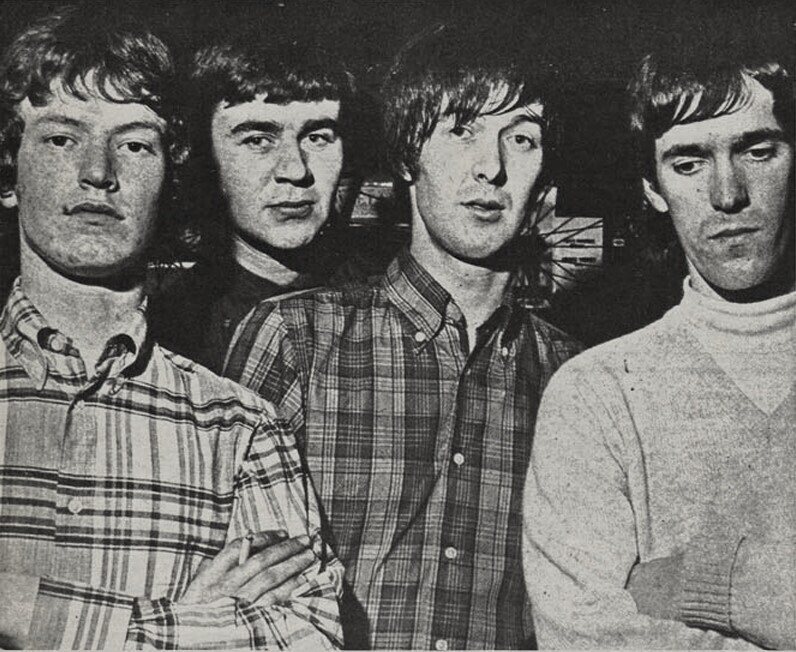
- the Spencer Davis Group in 1966
- Studio albums: 8
- Extended plays: 5
- Soundtrack albums: 1
- Live albums: 5
- Compilation albums: 27
- Singles: 30
- Video albums: 4

This article is the discography of British band The Spencer Davis Group.

== Albums ==
The Spencer Davis Group's first three studio albums were not released in the US and Canada. Instead, the first two albums released there were Gimme Some Lovin' and I'm a Man in 1967, both of which compiled tracks from the three studio albums.

=== Studio albums ===
Year	Title	Details	Peak chart positions	
Year	Title	Details	UK	GER
1965	Their First LP	Released: June 1965; Label: Fontana	6	—
1966	The Second Album	Released: 7 January 1966; Label: Fontana	3	—
1966	Autumn '66	Released: 26 August 1966; Label: Fontana	4	35
1968	With Their New Face On	Released: April 1968; Label: United Artists	—	—
1970	Funky	Released: 1970; Label: Date; Originally planned for release in 1969 in the UK as Letters From Edith but withdrawn. Then was released in the US by Date in 1970 as Funky but quickly withdrawn due to the dissolution of the label.	—	—
1973	Gluggo	Released: 1973; Label: Vertigo	—	—
1974	Living in a Back Street	Released: February 1974; Label: Vertigo	—	—
1986	Vibrate	Released: 1986; Label: Victoria; Only released in Spain	—	—
"—" denotes releases that did not chart or were not released

=== Live albums ===
Year	Title	Details
1995	Catch You on the Rebop: Live in Europe 73	Released: 1995; Label: RPM
1997	Payin' Them Blues Dues: The Spencer Davis Group...Alive in '97	Released: 1997; Label: Südpol; Only released in Germany
2004	Live in Manchester 2002	Released: 13 September 2004; Label: Angel Air
2006	Live at Blues Garage 2006	Released: 21 August 2006; Label: Cherry Red
2019	Live in Finland '67	Released: January 2019; Label: London Calling; Limited unofficial release

=== Soundtrack albums ===
Year	Title	Details
1968	Here We Go 'Round the Mulberry Bush	Released: 1968; Label: United Artists; Majority of tracks are by the Spencer Davis Group. Traffic perform three songs and another is by Andy Ellison

=== Compilation albums ===
Year	Title	Details	Peak chart positions		
Year	Title	Details	CAN	GER	US
1966	Beat with Soul	Released: 1966; Label: Fontana; Only released in Germany	—	10	—
1967	Gimme Some Lovin'	Released: February 1967; Label: United Artists; Only released in the US and Canada; Compilation of the band's first three studio albums plus the eponymous "Gimme Some Lovin'"	2	—	54
1967	I'm a Man	Released: June 1967; Label: United Artists; Only released in the US and Canada; Compilation of the band's first three studio albums plus the eponymous "I'm a Man" and its B-side "I Can't Get Enough of It"	4	—	83
1968	The Best of the Spencer Davis Group Featuring Stevie Winwood	Released: March 1968; Label: Island	—	—	—
1968	Spencer Davis' Greatest Hits	Released: March 1968; Label: United Artists; Only released in the US	—	—	195
1969	Heavies	Released: April 1969; Label: United Artists; Only released in the US	—	—	—
1972	Somebody Help Me	Released: 1972; Label: Island; Only released in Germany	—	—	—
1974	Gimme Some Lovin'	Released: 1974; Label: Island; Only released in Germany and the Netherlands	—	—	—
1975	The Very Best of the Spencer Davis Group	Released: 1975; Label: United Artists; Only released in the US	—	—	—
1984	Best of the Spencer Davis Group	Released: 1984; Label: Rhino; Only released in the US	—	—	—
1986	Greatest & Latest	Released: 1986; Label: PAR; Compilation of re-recorded tracks in 1986; Only released in the US	—	—	—
1987	The Best of the Spencer Davis Group	Released: 1987; Label: EMI America	—	—	—
1991	Keep On Running	Released: 1991; Label: Object Enterprises; Has been re-released under various labels as I'm a Man and Give Me Some Lovin'	—	—	—
1994	Taking Out Time 1967–1969	Released: 1994; Label: RPM	—	—	—
1996	Eight Gigs a Week — The Steve Winwood Years (2-CD)	Released: March 1996; Label: Island/Chronicles	—	—	—
1998	The Best of Spencer Davis Group	Released: 1998; Label: EMI-Capitol Special Markets; Only released in the US	—	—	—
1999	The Spencer Davis Group	Released: 1999; Label: Polydor/Island	—	—	—
2000	Mulberry Bush	Released: January 2000; Label: RPM	—	—	—
2000	Mojo Rhythms & Midnight Blues, Vol. 1: Sessions 1965–1968	Released: August 2000; Label: RPM	—	—	—
2000	Mojo Rhythms & Midnight Blues, Vol. 2: Shows 1965–1968	Released: November 2000; Label: RPM	—	—	—
2001	Live Anthology 1965–1968	Released: October 2001; Label: Varèse Sarabande; Only released in the US	—	—	—
2004	40th Anniversary: Keep on Running	Released: April 2004; Label: Cherry Red	—	—	—
2006	Studio & Stage: Essential Recordings	Released: 2006; Label: Metro	—	—	—
2007	The Complete Hit Collection	Released: 8 February 2007; Label: Weton-Wesgram	—	—	—
2011	Somebody Help Me: The Best of 1964–1968	Released: 27 September 2011; Label: Raven; Only released in Australia	—	—	—
2013	Keep on Running: The Collection	Released: 5 June 2013; Label: Cherry Red	—	—	—
2016	Taking Out Time: Complete Recordings 1967–1969	Released: 19 August 2016; Label: RPM	—	—	—
"—" denotes releases that did not chart or were not released

== EPs ==
Year	Title (Note: This is a list of EPs released in the UK. Various other EPs were released elsewhere)	Details	Peak chart positions
Year	Title	Details	UK
1965	You Put the Hurt on Me	Released: August 1965; Label: Fontana	4
1965	Every Little Bit Hurts	Released: October 1965; Label: Fontana	—
1966	Sittin' and Thinkin'	Released: May 1966; Label: Fontana	3
1978	Spencer Davis Group	Released: May 1978; Label: Island; Compilation EP	—
2017	Rambling Rose	Released: 22 April 2017; Label: Rhythm & Blues; Record Store Day release	—
"—" denotes releases that did not chart

== Singles ==
Year	Single	Peak chart positions										Album
Year	Single	UK	AUS	BE (WA)	CAN	GER	IRE	NL	NZ	SWE	US	Album
1964	"Dimples"	—	—	—	—	—	—	—	—	—	—	Their First LP
1964	"I Can't Stand It"	47	—	—	—	—	—	—	—	—	—	Their First LP
1965	"Every Little Bit Hurts"	41	—	—	9	—	—	—	—	—	—	Their First LP
1965	"Strong Love"	44	—	—	—	—	—	—	—	—	—	The Second Album
1965	"Keep On Running"	1	21 (Note: The Go-Set chart did not exist until October 1966, so chart position is taken from David Kent's retrospective charts.)	33	22	8	3	7	4	18	76	The Second Album
1966	"Somebody Help Me"	1	—	48	37	3	5	—	20	—	47	Autumn '66
1966	"This Hammer" (Norway and Sweden-only release)	—	—	—	—	—	—	—	—	—	—	The Second Album
1966	"Sittin' and Thinkin'" (Netherlands-only release)	—	—	—	—	—	—	—	—	—	—	Their First LP
1966	"When I Come Home"	12	—	49	—	20	—	—	—	—	—	Autumn '66
1966	"Together 'Til the End of Time" (Norway-only release)	—	—	—	—	—	—	—	—	—	—	Autumn '66
1966	"Take This Hurt Off Me" (Norway-only release)	—	—	—	—	—	—	—	—	—	—	Autumn '66
1966	"Georgia on My Mind" (Netherlands-only release)	—	—	—	—	—	—	—	—	—	—	The Second Album
1966	"Gimme Some Lovin'"	2	6	10	1	12	7	3	5	11	7	Non-album singles (Note: "Gimme Some Lovin'" was included on the US/Canada album Gimme Some Lovin'.)
1966	"Det war in Schöneberg" (Germany-only release)	—	—	—	—	—	—	—	—	—	—	Non-album singles
1966	"High Time Baby" (Norway-only release)	—	—	—	—	—	—	—	—	—	—	Autumn '66
1967	"I'm a Man"	9	9	22	1	17	—	7	—	4	10	Non-album single (Note: "I'm a Man" was included on the US/Canada album I'm a Man.)
1967	"Time Seller"	30	39	—	—	—	—	2	—	—	100	With Their New Face On
1967	"It's Gonna Work Out Fine" (New Zealand-only release)	—	—	—	—	—	—	—	—	—	—	Their First LP
1967	"When a Man Loves a Woman" (Italy-only release)	—	—	—	—	—	—	—	—	—	—	Autumn '66
1967	"Mr. Second Class"	35	—	—	—	33	—	—	—	—	—	With Their New Face On
1968	"After Tea"	56 (Note: Chart position is from the official UK "Breakers List".)	—	—	—	—	—	—	—	—	—	Non-album single
1968	"Looking Back" (US, Canada and Germany-only release)	—	—	—	—	—	—	—	—	—	113	Here We Go 'Round the Mulberry Bush
1968	"(Aquarius) Der Wassermann" (Germany and Netherlands-only release)	—	—	—	—	—	—	—	—	—	—	Non-album singles
1968	"Short Change"	—	—	—	—	—	—	—	—	—	—	Non-album singles
1971	"Magpie" (as 'The Murgatroyd Band')	—	—	—	—	—	—	—	—	—	—	Non-album singles
1973	"Don't You Let It Bring You Down" (US and Canada-only release)	—	—	—	—	—	—	—	—	—	—	Gluggo
1973	"Catch You on the Rebop"	—	—	—	—	—	—	—	—	—	—	Gluggo
1973	"Mr. Operator"	—	—	—	—	—	—	—	—	—	—	Gluggo
1973	"Livin' in a Back Street"	—	—	—	—	—	—	—	—	—	—	Living in the Back Street
1974	"Another Day" (Spain-only release)	—	—	—	—	—	—	—	—	—	—	Living in the Back Street
"—" denotes releases that did not chart or were not released

== Videos ==
=== Video albums ===
Year	Title	Details
2004	Live in Manchester	Released: 2 December 2004; Label: Angel Air; Medium: DVD; Live footage from Bridgewater Hall in Manchester in 2002
2005	Gimme Some Lovin': Live 1966	Released: 8 March 2005; Label: Cherry Red/Music Video Distributors; Medium: DVD
2008	Live	Released: November 2008; Label: Delta Music & Entertainment; Medium: DVD; Only released in Germany; Live footage from the Astor Theatre in Deal, Kent in 2006
2010	Beat Beat Beat	Released: 14 July 2008; Label: ABC Entertainment; Medium: DVD; Footage from the German TV programme Beat Beat Beat in 1966
