= When I Come Home =

Song written by Steve Winwood and Jackie Edwards

- Italian single sleeve

Single by the Spencer Davis Group

from the album Autumn '66
- B-side: "Trampoline"
- Released: 26 August 1966
- Recorded: 1966
- Genre: Blue-eyed soul; R&B
- Length: 1:57
- Label: Fontana
- Songwriter(s): Steve Winwood; Jackie Edwards
- Producer(s): Chris Blackwell

The Spencer Davis Group singles chronology
"Somebody Help Me" (1966)	"When I Come Home" (1966)	"Gimme Some Lovin'" (1966)

Audio
- "When I Come Home" on YouTube

"When I Come Home" is a song written by Steve Winwood and Jackie Edwards, first recorded by Winwood's band the Spencer Davis Group in 1966. Released as a single that summer, it reached number 12 in the UK Singles Chart. The single received mixed reviews upon release, with Penny Valentine deeming it inferior to their previous singles. The band was featured in the movie The Ghost Goes Gear (1966), miming to the track.

== Background and recording ==
By early 1966, the Spencer Davis Group had shot up in popularity, scoring a number-one single with "Keep On Running" (1965). This song was written by Jackie Edwards, a house songwriter for Island Records, who had their records distributed by Fontana Records, including those by the Spencer Davis Group. This led to a collaboration between Edwards and the band, whose lead singer and guitarist Steve Winwood started composing a follow-up to "Keep On Running", "When I Come Home". Winwood was inspired by fellow bands the Beatles and the Rolling Stones to compose original material. The session was produced by Island Records owner Chris Blackwell.

According to drummer Pete York, the group was experimenting with various instruments during their recording sessions which led to them adding extra percussion in the form of bongo drums on the recording. However, due to alleged exhaustion from Winwood during the session, "When I Come Home" was shelved in favour of a second song recorded at the same time, "Somebody Help Me", which was released as a single in place of "When I Come Home"; it reached number one in the UK. Additionally, "When I Come Home" had been conceived as a B-side. The song would be shelved until the group starred in the comedy film The Ghost Goes Gear (1966), miming to it, prompting Blackwell to issue it.

== Release and reception ==
"When I Come Home" was released through Fontana on 26 August 1966, backed by an instrumental song titled "Trampoline" written by Winwood; it was one of the first songs recorded by the group where he plays the hammond organ, which he later would do on following singles. Winwood was dissatisfied with the release, stating that the song had been much longer, which was cut by engineers, stating that "it's not a raver like the last two". Spencer Davis too, had wanted to issue a version of "Till the End of Time" as a single in place of "When I Come Home", though was advised against it. On the UK Singles chart it debuted on 7 September 1966 at a position of number 38. Despite being heavily promoted through television performances and the movie The Ghost Goes Gear, It only reached number 12 on 28 September, before dropping out at a position of number 43 on 2 November 1966.

Because of this perceived lack of success, Atco Records did not release the single in the US and because of the failure of their previous three singles there, they were dropped by the label. The Spencer Davis group themselves were not reportedly disappointed over the single's commercial failure, stating that "there were other things to life than hit singles". Blackwell however got anxious over this and to get them to record another hit, he demoed the song "Back Into My Life Again", written by Edwards and Jimmy Miller. They rejected it, passing it over to Love Affair instead. Despite this, it established a friendship between Miller and Winwood, the former who would produce the band's following single "Gimme Some Lovin'" (1966), and compose the successor to that, "I'm a Man". "When I Come Home" was included on the group's third album Autumn '66, released the same day as the single.

Upon release in the British press, it received primarily mixed reviews. Writing for Disc & Music Echo, Penny Valentine states that the single "isn't as great as one might expect", though notes that it isn't dreadful. She states that the single is gentle though "casually done", stating that the band's performance is lackluster. Though she believes the introductionary riff is good, she believes it's not "progressive enough", though ends by claiming that it will be a hit. In a blind date for Melody Maker, Small Faces bassist Ronnie Lane states that he "digs it", claiming "it's a gas" and that it "reminds me of a Don Covay number we [Small Faces] used to do. In Record Mirror, Norman Jopling and Peter Jones praise Winwood's vocals, claiming that it's "bluesy and husky." They note the "bass basis" and "rolling guitar phrases" of the song, while praising the vocal harmonization in some parts of it. Despite this, they claim it's note "whistle-able" despite "most likely becoming a hit".

== Charts ==
Chart performance for "When I Come Home"
Chart (1966)	Peak position
Belgium (Ultratop 50 Wallonia)	49
Sweden (Tio i Topp)	8
UK Disc & Music Echo Top 50	15
UK Melody Maker Pop 50	14
UK New Musical Express Top 30	14
UK Record Retailer Top 50	12
West Germany (Media Control)	20
