= Autumn '66 =

Studio album by the Spencer Davis Group
- Released: 2 September 1966
- Genre: R&B, beat
- Length: 32:59
- Label: Fontana TL5359
- Producer: Chris Blackwell

The Spencer Davis Group chronology
The Second Album (1966)	Autumn '66 (1966)	With Their New Face On (1968)

Singles from Autumn '66
- 1. "Somebody Help Me" Released: 18 March 1966 (UK) May, 1966 (US); 2. "When I Come Home" Released: 26 August 1966 (UK only)

Professional ratings
Review scores
Source	Rating
AllMusic	3/5 stars
The Encyclopedia of Popular Music	4/5 stars

Autumn' 66 is the third studio album by the British rock group the Spencer Davis Group released in September 1966. Although the album was not released in the US, the single "Somebody Help Me" was on the US Billboard Hot 100 charts for seven weeks and peaked at number 47 in July 1967, after having been their second consecutive number 1 hit in the UK. The album also contained the group's most recent UK hit single, "When I Come Home" (not released in America) plus the B-side to their first hit "Keep On Running", "High Time Baby".

Although never released in America, all but four tracks ("When A Man Loves A Woman", "Dust My Blues", "On the Green Light", and "Neighbour Neighbour") were released there either as album tracks or as B-sides.

The album peaked at number 4 on the UK chart on October 15, 1966 during a 20 week chart run.

== Reception ==
The AllMusic retrospective review by Richie Unterberger commented that "At the peak of their popularity, the Spencer Davis Group's albums were considerably less impressive than their hits", and criticized the album for relying too heavily on covers. However, they named the original songs "Somebody Help Me," "High Time Baby," "On the Green Light," and "When I Come Home" as highlights.

== Track listing ==
=== Side One ===
1. "Together 'Til the End of Time" (Frank Wilson) – 2:15)
2. "Take This Hurt Off Me" (Don Covay, Ron Dean Miller) – 2:44)
3. "Nobody Knows You When You're Down and Out" (Jimmy Cox) – 3:52)
4. "Midnight Special" (Traditional, arranged by Spencer Davis) – 2:13)
5. "When a Man Loves a Woman" (Andrew Wright, Calvin Lewis) – 3:08)
6. "When I Come Home" (Jackie Edwards, Steve Winwood) – 2:04

=== Side Two ===
1. "Mean Woman Blues" (Claude Demetrius) – 3:14
2. "Dust My Blues" (Elmore James) – 2:36
3. "On the Green Light" (S. Winwood) – 3:05
4. "Neighbour, Neighbour" (Huey Meaux) – 3:17
5. "High Time Baby" (S. Winwood, Davis, Muff Winwood, Pete York) – 2:31
6. "Somebody Help Me" (Edwards) – 2:00

== Personnel ==
=== The Spencer Davis Group ===
- Steve Winwood – lead guitar, organ, lead vocals (except where noted)
- Muff Winwood – bass
- Spencer Davis – rhythm guitar, vocals (lead vocal on "Midnight Special", "Dust My Blues" & "Neighbour, Neighbour")
- Pete York – drums, liner notes

=== Technical ===
- Chris Blackwell – producer
- Bob Auger – engineer
- Vic Singh – photography
