= Gluggo =

Studio album by Spencer Davis Group
- Released: 1973
- Studio: Advision Studios (track one) and Morgan Sound Studios (all others)
- Genre: Rock and roll
- Label: Vertigo, Mercury, Phonogram
- Producer: Spencer Davis Group

Spencer Davis Group chronology
Funky (1970)	Gluggo (1973)	Living in a Back Street (1974)

Gluggo is an album by the Spencer Davis Group, originally released in 1973 on Vertigo Records.

== Background ==
In 1969, the Spencer Davis Group recorded Funky, an album that was ultimately not released due to contract issues with their record label, although some pressings were bootlegged in the US in 1971.

Gluggo was their first album to feature keyboardist/vocalist Eddie Hardin, and original drummer Pete York since With Their New Face On in 1968. Hardin and York had released three albums as a duo in the interim while Hardin had cut the solo album. Bassist Charlie McCracken, formerly of Taste, who had played in a session capacity on With Their New Face On was now a full group member. Lead guitarist Ray Fenwick had played on individual tracks with this line-up before including the theme from the TV series Magpie but never on a full album before. The personnel on this recording included two of the original four members.

== Musical style ==
Although the Spencer Davis Group were known largely for jazz and blues inflected songs, this collection is much more rock oriented. Songs such as "Catch You on the Rebop", "Mr. Operator", and "Tumble Down Tenement Row" are characteristic of the group's 1960s sound, featuring precise drumbeats, loosely played organ, and hollered singing. Other songs include the instrumental "Today Gluggo, Tomorrow the World", a cover of the old blues "Trouble in Mind" (performed in the style of Nashville sound and twang vocals), and the country pop song "Legal Eagle Shuffle", which follows the genre's typical storyline of divorce and truck driving.

== Title and packaging ==
While the album's title is never defined, the LP packaging was designed with subway-style advertisements and marketing slogans promoting "gluggo" as a product along the lines of a detergent or an aphrodisiac; among the marketing tropes used are "unsolicited personal testimonials" and "9 out of 10 Doctors".

== Release ==
The original vinyl album had nine tracks, but the CD release has bonus tracks that include "Touching Cloth", the B-side to the single "Mr. Operator", and these latter two songs as previously unreleased rough mixes. "Don't You Let It Bring You Down" backed with "Today Gluggo, Tomorrow the World" was also released as a single.

In some territories, including Germany, the song "Alone" was substituted with "Living in a Backstreet", which also became the title track of the group's next album. CD reissues reflect this discrepancy with Alone included instead among the bonus tracks.

== Reception ==
Professional ratings
Review scores
Source	Rating
AllMusic	2.5/5 stars
Christgau's Record Guide	B

Reviewing Gluggo in December 1973 for Creem, Robert Christgau said "Davis has been putting out moderately enjoyable records for as long as I've kept track. This is a little less folky, worth investigating for non-charismatic, professional rock and roll." Joel Vance from Stereo Review called it "happy, loose, thoroughly professional", and "great fun", concluding that "it's good to have Spencer Davis back, undiluted and unbowed." Billboard also recommended the album for its mix of rock, blues, and folk. Commercially, Gluggo was unsuccessful, peaking at number 206 on Billboard's "Bubbling Under the Top LPs" chart.

== Track listing ==
=== Original vinyl edition ===
All tracks composed by Eddie Hardin and Ray Fenwick; except where indicated

=== Released on Vertigo Cat.nr 6360 088 ===
1. "Catch You on the Rebop" – (3:15)
2. "Don't You Let it Bring You Down" – (3:55)
3. "Alone" – (4:18)
4. "Today Gluggo, Tomorrow the World" (Pete York, Lionel Rubin) (3:43)
5. "Feeling Rude" – (3:17)
6. "Legal Eagle Shuffle" (Spencer Davis) (2:17)
7. "Trouble in Mind" (Richard M. Jones) (4:33)
8. "The Screw" - (3:45)
9. "Tumble Down Tenement Row" (Spencer Davis) (3:09)

=== German vinyl edition ===
1. "Catch You on the Rebop" – (3:15)
2. "Don't You Let it Bring You Down" – (3:55)
3. "Alone" – (4:18)
4. "Today Gluggo, Tomorrow the World" (Pete York, Lionel Rubin) (3:43)
5. "Feeling Rude" – (3:17)
6. "Mr. Operator" – (3:37)
7. "The Edge" – (2:21)
8. "The Screw" – (3:45)
9. "Tumble Down Tenement Row" (Spencer Davis) (3:09)

=== CD reissue ===
1. "Catch You on the Rebop" (E. Hardin / R. Fenwick) (3:15)
2. "Don't You Let it Bring You Down" (E. Hardin / R. Fenwick) (3:55)
3. "Living in a Backstreet" (R. Fenwick / E. Hardin) (3:24)
4. "Today Gluggo, Tomorrow the World" (P. York / L. Rubin) (3:43)
5. "Feeling Rude" (E. Hardin / R. Fenwick) (3:17)
6. "Mr. Operator" (E. Hardin / R. Fenwick) (3:37)
7. "The Edge" (E. Hardin / R. Fenwick) (2:21)
8. "The Screw" (E. Hardin / R. Fenwick) (3:45)
9. "Tumble Down Tenement Row" (S. Davis) (3:09)
10. "Alone" (E. Hardin / R. Fenwick) (4:18)
11. "Legal Eagle Shuffle" (S. Davis) (2:17)
12. "Trouble in Mind" (Richard M. Jones) (4:33)
13. "Touching Cloth" (P. York) (2:53) (B-side)
14. "Mr. Operator" (E. Hardin / R. Fenwick) (3:35)
15. "Touching Cloth" (P. York) (2:53)
- CD track listings vary by country.

== Personnel ==
Spencer Davis Group

- Spencer Davis – rhythm guitar, vocals
- Eddie Hardin – keyboards, vocals
- Ray Fenwick – lead guitar, vocals
- Charlie McCracken – bass, vocals
- Pete York – drums

Additional credits

- Dan Armstrong – programming
- Mike Butcher – engineering
- Gary Cooper – Steel Guitar
- Gilbert Kong – master recording
- Spencer Davis Group – production
