= Backstreet Boys (disambiguation) =

Backstreet Boys is an American boy band.

Backstreet Boys or Back Street Boys may also refer to:

Artists

- Wayne County and the Backstreet Boys, a short-lived punk rock band fronted by the singer now known as Jayne County

Albums

- The Backstreet Boys, a 1978 EP by British singer Patrik Fitzgerald
- Backstreet Boys (1996 album), studio album released worldwide except the US
- Backstreet Boys (1997 album), studio album only released in the US

Songs

- "Back Street Boys", by The Spencer Davis Group, from the album Living in a Back Street
