= Gimme Some Lovin' =

1966 single by the Spencer Davis Group

- Netherlands single picture sleeve

Single by the Spencer Davis Group
- B-side: "Blues in F"
- Released: 28 October 1966
- Recorded: 9–10 and 14 June 1966; 21 September 1966
- Studio: Philips (London)
- Genre: Rock; blues; blue-eyed soul; R&B
- Length: 2:56
- Label: Fontana (UK); United Artists (US)
- Songwriters: Steve Winwood; Spencer Davis; Muff Winwood
- Producers: Chris Blackwell; Jimmy Miller

The Spencer Davis Group singles chronology
"When I Come Home" (1966)	"Gimme Some Lovin'" (1966)	"I'm a Man" (1967)

Audio sample
- file; help

"Gimme Some Lovin'" is a song first recorded by the Spencer Davis Group. Released as a single in 1966, it reached the Top 10 of the record charts in several countries. Later, Rolling Stone included the song on its list of the 500 Greatest Songs.

Other artists have also recorded versions of the song; group singer Steve Winwood later recorded it live with Traffic and a rendition by the Blues Brothers reached number 18 on the main US singles chart.

== Background ==
As recalled by bassist Muff Winwood, the song was conceived, arranged, and rehearsed in just half an hour. At the time, the group was under pressure to come up with another hit, following the relatively poor showing of their previous single, "When I Come Home", written by Jamaican-born musician Jackie Edwards, who had also penned their earlier number one hits, "Keep On Running" and "Somebody Help Me". The band auditioned and rejected other songs Edwards offered them, and they let the matter slide until, with a recording session looming, manager Chris Blackwell took them to London, put them in a rehearsal room at the Marquee Club, and ordered them to come up with a new song:

"We started to mess about with riffs, and it must have been eleven o'clock in the morning. We hadn't been there half an hour, and this idea just came. We thought, bloody hell, this sounds really good. We fitted it all together and by about twelve o'clock, we had the whole song. Steve had been singing 'Gimme, gimme some loving' – you know, just yelling anything, so we decided to call it that. We worked out the middle eight and then went to a cafe that's still on the corner down the road. Blackwell came to see how we were going on, to find our equipment set up and us not there, and he storms into the cafe, absolutely screaming, 'How can you do this?' he screams. Don't worry, we said. We were all really confident. We took him back, and said, how's this for half an hour's work, and we knocked off 'Gimme Some Lovin' and he couldn't believe it. We cut it the following day and everything about it worked. That very night we played a North London club and tried it out on the public. It went down a storm. We knew we had another No. 1."

== Personnel ==
The Spencer Davis Group:

- Steve Winwood – lead vocals, organ, piano, percussion, lead guitar
- Spencer Davis – rhythm guitar, vocals
- Muff Winwood – bass, vocals
- Pete York – drums

== Chart performance ==
Chart (1966–1967)	Peak position
Australia (Kent Music Report)	6
Austria (Ö3 Austria Top 40)	4
Belgium (Ultratop 50 Flanders)	20
Belgium (Ultratop 50 Wallonia)	10
Canada Top Singles (RPM)	1
Germany (GfK)	12
Ireland (IRMA)	7
Netherlands (Single Top 100)	3
New Zealand (Listener)	5
UK (Singles Chart)	2
US (Billboard Hot 100)	7

== Lawsuit ==
In 2016, Willia Dean Parker and Rose Banks sued Mervyn Winwood, Steve Winwood, and Kobalt Music Publishing for copyright infringement, alleging that they plagiarized their 1965 song "Ain't That a Lot of Love". In 2019, it was ruled that the Spencer Davis Group did not plagiarize.

== Legacy ==
In 2004, Rolling Stone magazine ranked "Gimme Some Lovin'" at number 247 on its list of the 500 Greatest Songs of All Time. Winwood later recorded live versions of the song with Traffic for Welcome to the Canteen (1971) and The Last Great Traffic Jam (2005). In an album review for Welcome to the Canteen, AllMusic's William Ruhlmann wrote 'the [set list] capper was a rearranged version of Steve Winwood's old Spencer Davis Group hit "Gimme Some Lovin'." '

"Gimme Some Lovin'" has been recorded by several rock and other artists. Pop artist Olivia Newton-John covered it for her 1978 album, Totally Hot, which an album reviewer called "as close to a drunken party as one will get on a Newton-John album". A performance for the musical comedy film The Blues Brothers (1980) "featur[es] an arrangement notable for the horn section that replaces Steve Winwood's rumbling organ work", according to critic Bret Adams. Released as single by Atlantic Records, it reached number 18 on Billboard magazine's Hot 100 chart, number 22 on the Canadian RPM Top Singles chart, and number 20 on the Dutch Single Top 100. In 1990, British group Thunder recorded it for their debut album Backstreet Symphony. AllMusic writer Alex Henderson commented: "Another high point of this CD is an inspired cover of the Spencer Davis Group's 'Gimme Some Lovin',' which Thunder changes from blue-eyed soul/rock to straight-up hard rock."
