= Hey Darling =

Hey Darling may refer to:

== Songs ==
- "Hey Darling", by Ace of Base, from the album Da Capo
- "Hey Darling", by The Spencer Davis Group, from the album The Second Album
