= Their First LP =

Studio album by the Spencer Davis Group
- Released: June 1965
- Genre: British rhythm and blues
- Length: 32:59
- Label: Fontana
- Producer: Chris Blackwell

The Spencer Davis Group chronology
Their First LP (1965)	The Second Album (1966)

Singles from Their First LP
- 1. "Dimples" Released: 22 May 1964; 2. "I Can't Stand It" Released: 9 October 1964; 3. "Every Little Bit Hurts" Released: 5 February 1965; 4. "Sittin' and Thinkin'" Released: 18 July 1966; 5. "It's Gonna Work Out Fine" Released: July 1967

Professional ratings
Review scores
Source	Rating
AllMusic	3/5 stars
Encyclopedia of Popular Music	3/5 stars
New Musical Express	4/5 stars
Record Mirror	4/5 stars

Their First LP is the debut studio album by the Spencer Davis Group, released in the UK and Europe in June 1965. It peaked at number 6 on the UK Albums Chart. Although never released in its original incarnation in the US, a majority of the tracks from this album were later released in various compilations of the band marketed to US audiences.

== Release ==
Their First LP features the group's first three singles, "Dimples", "I Can't Stand It" and "Every Little Bit Hurts". Whilst "Dimples" missed the charts, the other two briefly entered the charts, though didn't peak above the Top 40. The fourth single, "Sitin' and Thinkin'" was released in July 1966, but only in the Netherlands. The final single, "It's Gonna Work Out Fine" was only released in New Zealand in July 1967.

Despite being released at the beginning of June 1965, Their First LP didn't enter the UK Albums Chart until the first week of January 1966, when their single "Keep On Running", included on their second album, was in the charts. It reached its peak three weeks later and spent a total of eight week in the album chart.

== Track listing ==
Side one
No.	Title	Writer(s)	Length
1.	"My Babe"	Bobby Hatfield, Bill Medley	2:41
2.	"Dimples"	John Lee Hooker	2:22
3.	"Searchin'"	Jerry Leiber, Mike Stoller	2:42
4.	"Every Little Bit Hurts"	Ed Cobb	3:29
5.	"I'm Blue (Gong Gong Song)"	Ike Turner	2:45
6.	"Sittin' and Thinkin'"	Spencer Davis	3:00

Side two
No.	Title	Writer(s)	Length
7.	"I Can't Stand It"	Smokey McAllister	2:11
8.	"Here Right Now"	Steve Winwood	3:15
9.	"Jump Back"	Rufus Thomas	1:47
10.	"It's Gonna Work Out Fine"	Joe Seneca, Rose Marie McCoy	3:06
11.	"Midnight Train"	Alvin Roy, Gerry Hicks	2:43
12.	"It Hurts Me So"	Winwood	2:58
Total length:			32:59

== Personnel ==
- Spencer Davis – vocals, guitar, harmonica
- Steve Winwood – lead vocals, guitar, harmonica, piano
- Muff Winwood – vocals, bass guitar
- Pete York – drums
- Kenny Salmon – organ (4, 8)
- Peter Asher – piano (5)
- Millie Small – vocals (5)

== Charts ==
Chart (1966)	Peak position
UK Albums (OCC)	6
