= The Second Album (The Spencer Davis Group album) =

Studio album by the Spencer Davis Group
- Released: 7 January 1966
- Genre: Blues rock
- Length: 36:38
- Label: Fontana
- Producers: Jimmy Miller; Chris Blackwell

The Spencer Davis Group chronology
Their First LP (1965)	The Second Album (1966)	Autumn '66 (1966)

Singles from The Second Album
- 1. "Strong Love" Released: 21 May 1965; 2. "Keep on Running" Released: 26 November 1965

Professional ratings
Review scores
Source	Rating
Record Mirror	4/5 stars

The Second Album is the second album by the British band the Spencer Davis Group, released in 1966. Many of the songs were a slightly experimental blend of beat, folk, jazz and blues. The album included the singles "Strong Love" (UK number 44) and Jackie Edwards' "Keep on Running" (which gave the group their first U.K. number 1). It also included the R&B standard "Georgia on My Mind". The album spent eighteen weeks on the U.K. album chart, peaking at number 3. While the album was not released in the US, the single "Keep on Running" was released in February, 1966, and spent four weeks on the Billboard Hot 100 chart peaking at number 74 on March 12. Other tracks from this album were later released in the U.S. on various compilations of the band.

Although never released in America, all but four tracks ("Strong Love", "I Washed My Hands In Muddy Water", "Since I Met You Baby", and "You Must Believe Me") were released on the group's American albums. "Strong Love" was released on compilation albums in Canada in 1967 and the US in 1984 respectively.

== Track listing ==
=== Side one ===
1. "Look Away" (Norman Meade, Bert Russell) – 2:45
2. "Keep on Running" (Jackie Edwards) – 2:51
3. "This Hammer" (Muff Winwood, Steve Winwood, Pete York, Spencer Davis) – 2:19
4. "Georgia On My Mind" (Hoagy Carmichael, Stuart Gorrell) – 4:44
5. "Please do Something" (Don Covay) – 2:27
6. "Let Me Down Easy" (Dee Dee Ford) – 3:06

=== Side two ===
7. "Strong Love" (Deadric Malone, Edward Silvers, Mary M. Brown) – 2:18
8. "I Washed My Hands In Muddy Water" (Joe Babcock) – 2:38
9. "Since I Met You Baby" (Ivory Joe Hunter) – 3:30
10. "You Must Believe Me" (Curtis Mayfield) – 2:49
11. "Hey Darling" (Davis, S. Winwood) – 4:49
12. "Watch Your Step" (Bobby Parker) – 2:57

== Personnel ==
=== The Spencer Davis Group ===
- Steve Winwood – lead guitar, lead vocals (1–7, 10–12), organ, piano
- Spencer Davis – rhythm guitar, backing and lead (8, 9) vocals
- Muff Winwood – bass guitar
- Pete York – drums, percussion

=== Technical ===
- Chris Blackwell – producer
- Clifford Jones – photography
- Chris Welch – liner notes
