= Golden Eagle, Birmingham =

The Golden Eagle
- Interactive map of the The Golden Eagle area

General information
- Status: Demolished
- Type: Public house
- Location: Hill Street, Birmingham, England
- Coordinates: 52.47860°N 1.90247°W
- Opening: 1930s
- Demolished: 1980s
- Client: Holt Brewery Company

The Golden Eagle was a 1930s public house in Birmingham, England, which became known as a venue for live music.

The pub stood on Hill Street, in Birmingham City Centre, between Victoria Square and the western end of New Street Station.

It closed in January 1984 and was demolished soon afterwards.

== Architecture ==
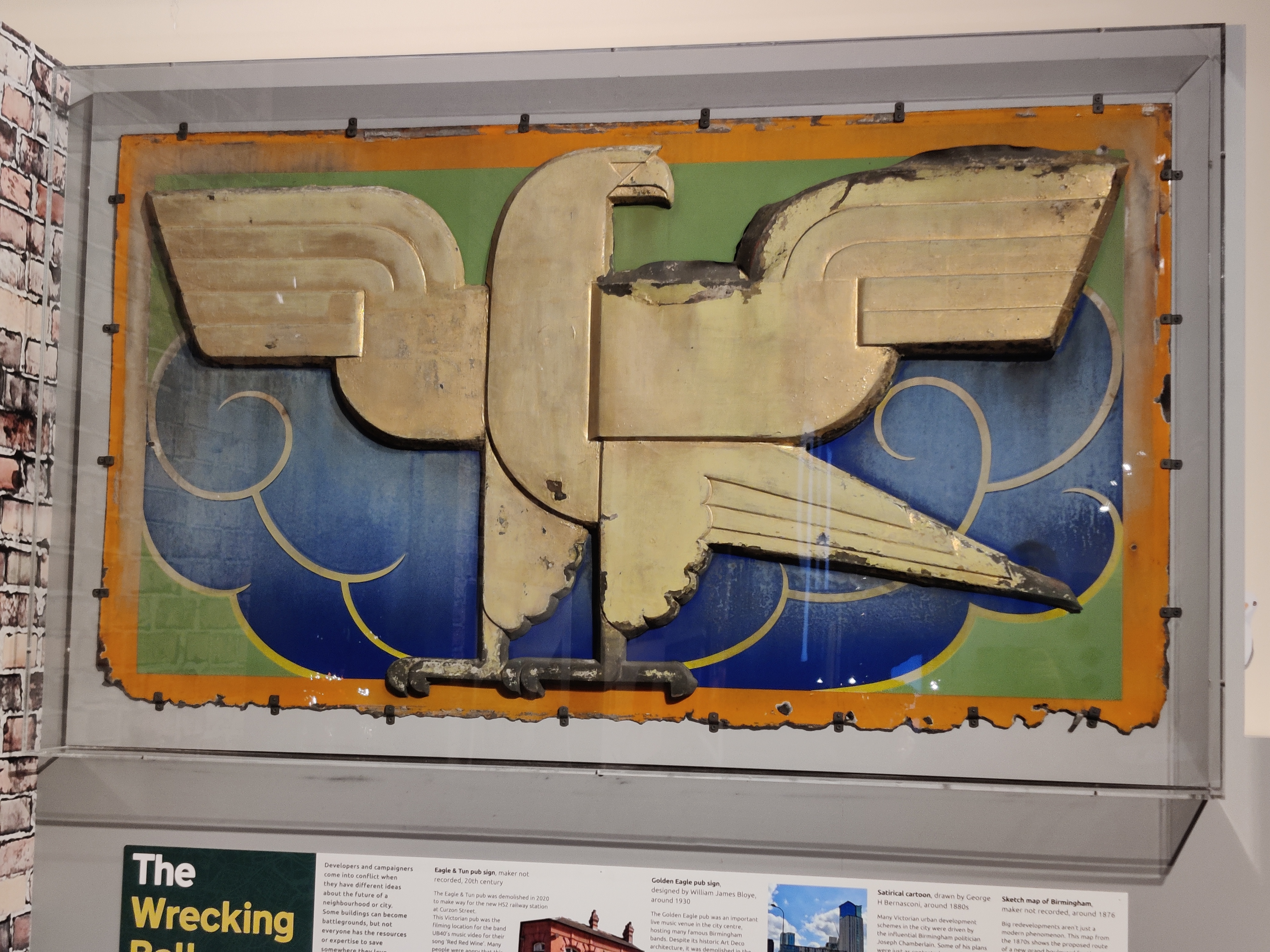
Pub sign by William Bloye, now on display in Birmingham Museum and Art Gallery

The building, commissioned by the Holt Brewery Company (and later operated by their successors, Ansells Brewery), in art deco style was clad in black stone, with a painted metal bas relief sculpture of a stylised golden eagle, by sculptor William Bloye, over the main entrance.

It was erected in the 1930s on the site of an earlier pub of the same name.

== Music ==
It was at the Golden Eagle, in 1963, that Spencer Davis met brothers Steve (then aged 14 and still at school) and Muff Winwood, performing there as the Muffy Wood Jazz Band, resulting in them forming the Spencer Davis Group. The Spencer Davis Group made their debut at the Eagle, and subsequently had a Monday-night residency here.

Other bands who played there before going on to bigger things include Iron Maiden and U2.

For a year from June 1973, the pub was home to a folk club, run by resident Birmingham folk/rock band Scotch Mist.

From 1976 to 1979, a club night, "Shoop Shoop", was held on Thursdays. Shoop Shoop was run by Mike Horseman and Pete King, the latter of whom went on to manage Steel Pulse.

== Legacy ==
In August 2018, Birmingham-based Two Towers brewery launched a "Golden Eagle" ruby ale, in their "Gone but Not Forgotten" range, to commemorate the pub.

The site of the pub subsequently became a car park. In November 2025, city council officers recommended that plans for a 16-storey tower block comprising student accommodation to be built in the site be approved by councillors.
