= Pete York =

English rock drummer (born 1942)

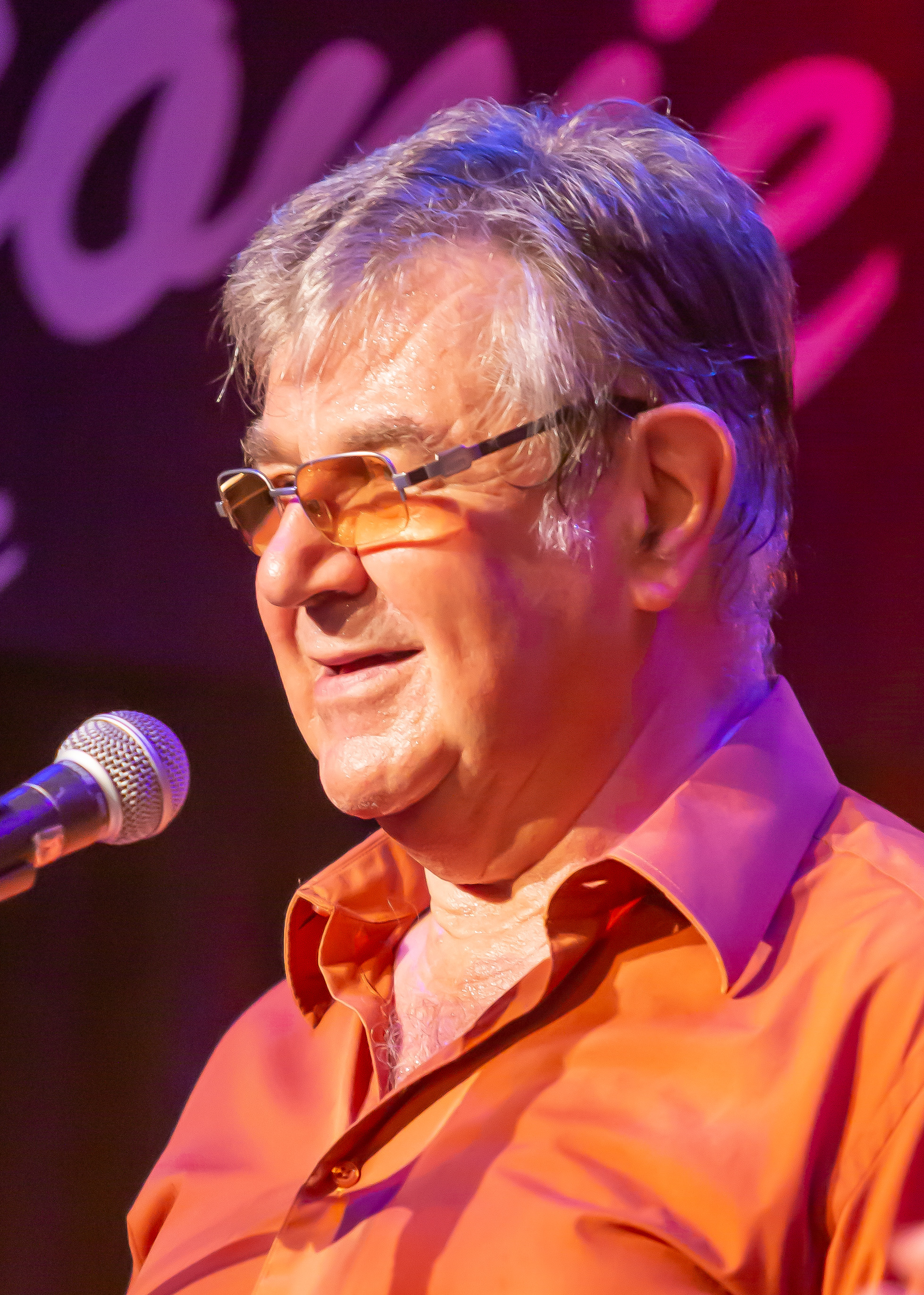
- York in 2013

Background information
- Born: Peter York; 15 August 1942 (age 84); Middlesbrough, Yorkshire, England
- Origin: Redcar, England
- Genres: Rock; R&B
- Instrument: Drums
- Years active: 1960s–present
- Label: Fontana
- Formerly of: The Spencer Davis Group, Hardin and York
- Website: peteyork.net

Peter York (born 15 August 1942) is an English rock drummer who has been performing since the 1960s. He is best known for his time with the Spencer Davis Group.

== Early life ==
York was born in Middlesbrough and grew up in Redcar. He started playing drums in 1950, aged seven or eight, when he banged on toy drums and his mothers cooking pots, while American jazz music would play on the radio.

York attended the Nottingham High School and learnt to play the trumpet and snare drum in a school band. His biggest influence as a teenager was Gene Krupa, and he would play drums in the Trent College Jazz Club, the school orchestra and an Army Cadet Force Band.

== Career ==
After leaving school in 1960, York moved to Birmingham, and got involved in the music scene. He was in an award-winning jazz group, with whom his first television appearance came with in 1962.

York was a member of Eric Clapton's Powerhouse—a short-lived blues band in 1966. It starred Eric Clapton (guitar), and featured Paul Jones (harmonica) and Jack Bruce (bass), Steve Winwood (vocals) with York (drums), and Ben Palmer (piano). Three recordings the band made were included on the 1966 compilation album, What's Shakin', which also featured recordings by American groups the Lovin' Spoonful and the Paul Butterfield Blues Band.

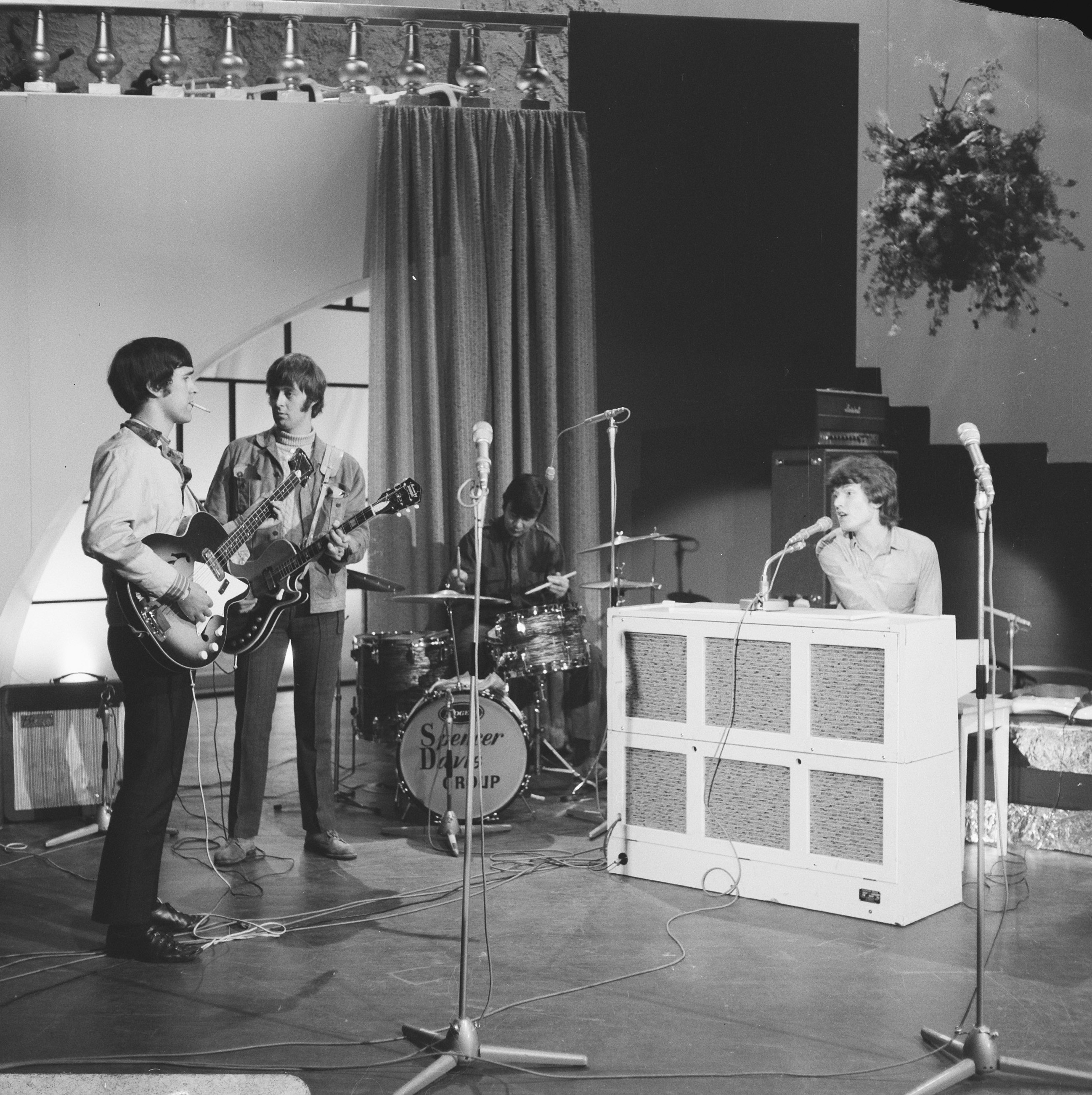
York (back, centre) performing with the Spencer Davis Group in 1966

He was one of the original members of the Spencer Davis Group, along with Spencer Davis and the brothers Steve and Muff Winwood, in 1963. York stayed with the band until 1969. In 1964, they signed to Fontana Records. They would release two consecutive records that topped the UK charts in 1965 and 1966 respectively, "Keep On Running" and "Somebody Help Me". They are also known for their 1966 recording, "Gimme Some Lovin'", which went to number 2 in the UK, and was a US top ten.

He left the Spencer Davis Group to form Hardin and York with Eddie Hardin, who had also been in the Spencer Davis Group. They recorded six studio albums throughout the 1970s, including a collaboration album with Norethern Irish blues guitarist, Charlie McCracken. In 1972, he formed The Pete York Percussion Band, which included three drummers and guitarist Miller Anderson. Amongst the three drummers were also occasional guest drummers, including Ian Paice (Deep Purple), Keef Hartley (The Keef Hartley Band), Roy Dyke (Ashton, Gardner and Dyke) and Keith Moon (The Who). A year later, he performed in Germany when German saxophonist Klaus Doldinger put together his own group, Passport, with a British star lineup featuring Alexis Korner, Brian Auger and Johnny Griffin.

In the 80s he fronted an all-star band called Olympic Rock & Blues Circus featuring a rotating line-up of the likes of Jon Lord, Miller Anderson, Tony Ashton, Brian Auger, Zoot Money, Colin Hodgkinson, Chris Farlowe and many others. Olympic Rock & Blues Circus toured primarily in Germany, in 1981/82 and 1989, and also appeared sporadically in the UK under the name Endangered Species.

In February 1987, York started his first German television series of "Superdrumming". Superdrumming was a yearly concert that featured many famous rock and blues drummers, and which were all recorded and released between 1987 and 1989. Superdrumming 1987 included Ian Paice, Louie Bellson, Cozy Powell, Gerry Brown and Simon Phillips; 1988 included Billy Cobham, Bill Bruford, Dave Mattacks, Zak Starkey, Nicko McBrain, Jon Lord and Eddie Hardin, and 1989 included Chris Farlowe, Zoot Money, Tony Ashton, Lord, Miller Anderson, and Colin Hodgkinson.

In August 1992, to celebrate his 50th birthday, York held his own show in Switzerland, to a crowd of 8,000. In the 1990s, York was in a revived version of the Spencer Davis Group, but without the Winwood brothers from the original lineup.

== Personal life ==
York married his wife, Mecky, on 16 June 1977. They had a daughter, born in 1979. On 31 August 2004, York fell off a ladder while fixing his security camera, but was healed in time for upcoming gigs.

== Discography ==
=== Solo projects ===
Unless there is a note in the "Notes" section, all releases were solo works, released as "Pete York".

| Year | Title | Notes |
|---|---|---|
| 1972 | The Pete York Percussion Band | Released as The Pete York Percussion Band |
| 1980 | Into the Furnace | Released as Pete York's New York |
| 1981 | What's the Racket | Released as Pete York's New York |
| 1981 | Open Road | |
| 1983 | Pete York's New York | Released as Pete York's New York |
| 1987 | Super Drumming Vol. 1 | |
| 1989 | Super Drumming Vol. 2 | |
| 1990 | Super Drumming Vol. 3 | |
| 1990 | String Time in New York | |
| 1994 | Superblues | |
| 1994 | Swinging Hollywood | |
| 1996 | Live – Listen Here! | Released as Pete York's Blue Jive Five |
| 1998 | Live – Second Set | Released as Pete York's Blue Jive Five |
| 1998 | Live & Swinging | Released as Pete York Jazz Stars |
| 2005 | Extension 345 – Live 1974 | Released as The Pete York Percussion Band |
| 2013 | Basiecally Speaking | Released as Pete York & Young Friends |

=== Groups ===
| Year | Artist | Title | Note |
|---|---|---|---|
| 1965 | The Spencer Davis Group | Their First LP | |
| 1966 | The Spencer Davis Group | The Second Album | |
| 1966 | Eric Clapton's Powerhouse | What's Shakin' | |
| 1966 | The Spencer Davis Group | Autumn '66 | |
| 1968 | The Spencer Davis Group | With Their New Face On | |
| 1969 | Hardin & York | Tomorrow Today | |
| 1970 | Hardin & York | The World's Smallest Big Band | |
| 1970 | Chris Harwood | Nice to Meet Miss Christine | |
| 1970 | Jade | Fly On Strangewings | |
| 1971 | Hardin & York | For the World | |
| 1971 | Nazareth | Nazareth | |
| 1971 | Keef Hartley | Little Big Band | |
| 1971 | Ray Fenwick | Keep America Beautiful, Get a Haircut | |
| 1971 | Les McCann | Invitation to Openness | |
| 1972 | Eddie Taylor | Ready for Eddie | |
| 1972 | Hardin & York | Pop History | |
| 1972 | Eddie Hardin | Home Is Where You Find It | |
| 1973 | The Spencer Davis Group | Gluggo | |
| 1973 | Willie Mabon | The Comeback | |
| 1974 | The Spencer Davis Group | Living in a Back Street | |
| 1974 | Hardin & York | Hardin & York with Charlie McCracken | |
| 1974 | Jon Lord | Windows | |
| 1974 | Cousin Joe | Bluesman from New Orleans | |
| 1974 | Big John Wrencher | Big John's Boogie | |
| 1975 | Eddie Playboy Taylor & The Blueshounds | Ready for Eddie | |
| 1975 | Mickey Baker | Take a Look Inside | |
| 1975 | Doldinger Jubilee | Doldinger Jubilee '75 | |
| 1976 | Jon Lord | Sarabande | |
| 1976 | Eddie Hardin | Wizard's Convention | |
| 1976 | Homesick James | Home Sweet Homesick James | |
| 1978 | Chris Barber | Sideways | |
| 1979 | Hardin & York | Hardin & New York | |
| 1981 | Eberhard Schoener | Bali-Agung | |
| 1981 | Olympic Rock & Blues Circus | Olympic Rock & Blues Circus | |
| 1982 | Eddie Hardin | Circumstantial Evidence | |
| 1983 | Rick Sanders/Pete York/Steve Richardson | String Time | |
| 1983 | Pete York/"Wolfhound" Wolfgang Schmid/Lenny Mac Dowell | Once Upon A Time... Der Rattenfänger Von Hameln | |
| 1983 | Brian Auger/Pete York/Chris Farlowe | Olympic Rock & Blues Circus | |
| 1984 | Pete York/"Wolfhound" Wolfgang Schmid/Lenny Mac Dowell | Wireless | |
| 1984 | Lenny MacDowell | Balance of Power | |
| 1985 | Spencer Davis/Pete York/Colin Hodgkinson | Live Together | |
| 1985 | Brian Auger/Pete York/Colin Hodgkinson | Steaming | |
| 1985 | Richard Souther | Heirbone | |
| 1986 | Konstantin Dahoam | Weider Dahoam | |
| 1986 | Richard Souther | Innermission | |
| 1987 | Margaret Becker | Never for Nothing | |
| 1988 | Chris Farlowe/Spencer Davis/Pete York/Colin Hodgkinson/Zoot Money/Miller Anderson | Extremely Live At Birmingham Town Hall | |
| 1988 | Margaret Becker | The Reckoning | |
| 1994 | Hardin & York | Live at the Marquee 1971 | |
| 1994 | Hardin & York | Hardin & York Live | Previously a Bootleg recording |
| 1995 | Hardin & York | Still a Few Pages | |
| 1997 | Hardin & York | Live in the 70's | |
| 1998 | Jon Lord | Pictured Within | |
| 2004 | Jon Lord | Beyond the Notes | |
| 2007 | Herman Rarebell/Pete York/Charly Antolini | Drum Legends – Live 2005 | |
| 2009 | GoodTimes-All-Star-Band | Good Times Songs | |
| 2011 | Helge und Band | Komm Hier Haste Ne Mark! Live | |
| 2011 | Jon Lord Blues Project | Live | |
