= Eric Clapton and the Powerhouse =

British blues rock band (1966)

- Also known as: Powerhouse; The Powerhouse
- Origin: London
- Genre: Rhythm & Blues
- Years active: 1966
- Label: Elektra
- Past members: Eric Clapton; Steve Winwood; Paul Jones; Jack Bruce; Pete York; Ben Palmer

Eric Clapton and the Powerhouse was a British Rhythm & Blues studio group formed in 1966. They recorded three songs, which were released on the Elektra Records compilation What's Shakin' in 1966. A possible fourth song remained unreleased.

== History ==
The Powerhouse was formed with full intention of being a short-lived studio project. In 1965 and 1966, American record producer Joe Boyd was in the process of opening a London office for Elektra Records and was looking for some British talent to feature on the first release from the label's local division, a sampler compilation album. Manfred Mann's singer Paul Jones suggested putting together an all-star band to mark the occasion.

This band featured Jones playing harmonica alongside Eric Clapton on guitar and Manfred Mann's Jack Bruce on bass together with Steve Winwood on vocals and Pete York on drums (both from the Spencer Davis Group), and Ben Palmer on piano, who had previously played with Clapton and Jones as a member of the Roosters and the Glands. Originally, Ginger Baker was intended to fill the drummer's position, but he was unavailable at the time.

=== What's Shakin' ===
The Powerhouse only recorded a few songs in March 1966 (produced by Boyd), three of which were released on the Elektra compilation album What's Shakin' alongside tracks by the Lovin' Spoonful, Al Kooper, Tom Rush and the Butterfield Blues Band. The album was later reissued in the UK under the title Good Time Music.

The tracks included were "Crossroads" (R. Johnson), "Steppin' Out" (M. Slim) and "I Want to Know" (S. MacLeod). There was a fourth song recorded, a "slow blues", but to this day it remains unreleased. "The slow blues was never issued, so they must have it on tape at Elektra somewhere", said Clapton in a March 1968 interview, printed in Guitar Player magazine in 1992. "It was pretty good, too."

Due to contractual constraints, Winwood was credited as "Steve Anglo" in the original album's liner notes. It has also been suggested that the song "I Want to Know" was in fact written by Jones under a pseudonym instead of his wife, Sheila MacLeod.

=== After the Powerhouse ===
Many members of the Powerhouse later played together as members of other bands. Bruce and Clapton formed Cream in 1966 with Ginger Baker, and Palmer later joined them as their tour manager. Clapton and Winwood have appeared together on numerous occasions, most notably from 1968 to 1969 as half of Blind Faith, with Ric Grech and again Ginger Baker.

Since their original release the Powerhouse recordings have been re-released intermittently, with the band being credited differently depending on the release: "Crossroads" was included on Winwood's compilation album Winwood in 1971 credited to 'Powerhouse'; "I Want to Know" was included on Clapton's compilation The History of Eric Clapton in 1972, crediting the band as 'The Powerhouse'; both "Crossroads" and "I Want to Know" were released together on Winwood's box-set The Finer Things in 1995, attributed simply to Eric Clapton; and all three previously released tracks, "Crossroads", "I Want to Know", and "Steppin' Out", were included in Jack Bruce's 2008 anthology Can You Follow? credited to 'Eric Clapton and the Powerhouse'.

== Band members ==
- Eric Clapton – guitar
- Steve Winwood (as Steve Anglo) – vocals
- Paul Jones (as Jacob Matthews) – harmonica
- Jack Bruce – bass
- Pete York (as Peter Howard) – drums
- Ben Palmer – piano
