= With Their New Face On =

Studio album by The Spencer Davis Group
- Released: 8 June 1968 (UK)
- Recorded: 1967–1968
- Length: 35:18
- Label: United Artists
- Producers: Mike Hurst, Spencer Davis, Eddie Hardin

The Spencer Davis Group chronology
Autumn '66 (1966)	With Their New Face On (1968)	Funky (1970)

Singles from With Their New Face On
- 1. "Time Seller / Don't Want You No More" Released: 21 July 1967; 2. "Mr. Second Class / Sanity Inspector" Released: 29 December 1967 (UK only)

With Their New Face On is the fourth studio album by the Spencer Davis Group, the first to be released after the departure of Steve Winwood (to form the group Traffic), and his brother Muff Winwood. The album was released in 1968 in both the UK and the U.S. on the United Artists label.

== Background ==
Following the departure of the Winwood brothers in April 1967, Spencer Davis and drummer Peter York were required to assemble a new lineup for the band. They recruited organist/vocalist Eddie Hardin, and guitarist/ vocalist Phil Sawyer, who had played in The Fleur de Lys and Shotgun Express. The band lacked a bassist, instead relying on the bass provided by Hardin's Hammond organ pedals. The new lineup made their debut at the Marquee club on 30 May.

The band's first recordings were made for the soundtrack to the movie Here We Go Round the Mulberry Bush, which also included contributions from Steve Winwood's new group, Traffic. The single "Time Seller" was released in July. Featuring a string section, the single marked a shift in the band's sound towards a more progressive direction. Sawyer departed the band in November, to be replaced by guitarist Ray Fenwick. He joined in time to appear on the release of the single "Mr. Second Class", released in December. "Time Seller" and "Mr. Second Class" charted on the UK charts at number 30 and number 35 respectively and were featured heavily on Tony Blackburn's Radio Caroline show.

The remaining tracks for With Their New Face On were recorded in the spring of 1968. "Time Seller" and "Don't Want You No More" were remixed, with Sawyer's vocals being overdubbed by Hardin and Fenwick respectively. Another single, "After Tea", was released in March, but failed to chart, and was not included on the album. The album was released on 8 June 1968 and likewise failed to chart. In October, both Hardin and York left the band, later to form the duo 'Hardin & York' in 1969.

The album reflected a shift in musical style, expanding the band's pop/R&B roots to include the popular psychedelia of the time, along with Classical Music elements.

"Don't Want You No More" would be covered by The Allman Brothers Band as an instrumental on their 1969 album, The Allman Brothers Band.

== Track listing ==
All tracks written by Spencer Davis and Eddie Hardin except where noted.

side one
No.	Title	Writer(s)	Length
1.	"With His New Face On"		3:20
2.	"Mr. Second Class"		3:16
3.	"Alec in Transitland"	Spencer Davis, Eddie Hardin, Kirk Duncan, Pete York	6:50
4.	"Sanity Inspector"		3:04
5.	"Feel Your Way"		2:59

side two
No.	Title	Writer(s)	Length
6.	"Morning Sun"	Davis, Hardin, Duncan, Nicky James	3:19
7.	"Moonshine"	Davis, Hardin, York	2:41
8.	"Don't Want You No More"	Davis, Sawyer	3:16
9.	"Time Seller"		2:53
10.	"Stop Me, I'm Falling"		3:30

== Personnel ==
- Eddie Hardin – lead vocals, keyboards
- Ray Fenwick – lead guitar, backing vocals, lead vocal on "Don't Want You No More".
- Spencer Davis – rhythm guitar, backing vocals, lead vocal on "Sanity Inspector"
- Pete York – drums, percussion
