= World Classic Rockers =

US musical group

- Also known as: WCR
- Origin: United States
- Genres: Rock, hard rock
- Years active: 1995–present
- Spinoff of: Steppenwolf; Toto; Badfinger; Wings; The Spencer Davis Group; Poco; Eagles; Vanilla Fudge; Foreigner; Lynyrd Skynyrd; Journey; Santana; Boston
- Members: Nick St. Nicholas; Michael Monarch; Randall Hall; Aynsley Dunbar; Greg Walker; Fran Cosmo
- Past members: Bobby Kimball; Rosilee; Joey Molland; Kurt Griffey; Richard Ward; Mike Younce; Denny Laine; Spencer Davis; Randy Meisner; Carmine Appice; Denny Seiwell; Fergie Frederiksen; Steve Stewart; Ron Wikso; Randall Hall; Russell Powell; Dave Coyle; Alex Ligertwood; Mark Hoyt; Juan del Castillo; Daniel Formica
- Website: http://www.worldclassicrockers.com

World Classic Rockers (or WCR) is a rock supergroup band that was founded based from Las Vegas in 1995 by Nick St. Nicholas of Steppenwolf. St. Nicholas has toured with the band since its inception, which, in similar fashion to Ringo Starr's All-Starr Band, rotates its lineup depending on the contributing musicians' projects at a given time.

WCR performed for the first time in Fort Lauderdale, Florida on December 10, 1995, with St. Nicholas, Bobby Kimball of Toto, and Joey Molland of Badfinger with Richard Ward (keys), Rosilee (vocals), Mike Younce (drums), and Kurt Griffey (guitar) in the backing band. The three joined Mike Pinera and his Classic Rock All-Stars in putting together a live show for the Harley-Davidson Toys for Tots Run.

== Band members ==
Official World Classic Rockers members
December 1995	Nick St. Nicholas (Steppenwolf) – bass, vocals; Bobby Kimball (Toto) – vocals; Rosilee – vocals; Joey Molland (Badfinger) – guitar, vocals; Kurt Griffey – guitar; Richard Ward – keyboards, Mike Younce – drums
Fall 1996	Nick St. Nicholas (Steppenwolf) – bass, vocals; Bobby Kimball (Toto) – vocals; Denny Laine (Wings) – guitar, vocals; Spencer Davis (Spencer Davis Group) – guitar, vocals; Michael Monarch (Steppenwolf) – guitar; Randy Meisner (Poco, Eagles) – bass, vocals; Carmine Appice (Vanilla Fudge) – drums
1997	Nick St. Nicholas (Steppenwolf) - bass, vocals; Bobby Kimball (Toto) - vocals; Denny Laine (Wings) - guitar, vocals; Michael Monarch (Steppenwolf) - guitar; Randy Meisner (Poco, Eagles) - bass, vocals; Rosilee - vocals; Joey Molland (Badfinger) - guitar, vocals; Kurt Griffey - guitar; Denny Seiwell (Wings) - drums
1998–2002	Nick St. Nicholas (Steppenwolf) - bass, vocals; Denny Laine (Wings) - guitar, vocals; Michael Monarch (Steppenwolf) - guitar; Randy Meisner (Poco, Eagles)- bass, vocals; Rosilee - vocals; Kurt Griffey - guitar; Fergie Frederiksen (Toto) - vocals; Spencer Davis (Spencer Davis Group) - guitar, vocals; Steve Stewart - keyboards, vocals; Ron Wikso (Foreigner) - drums
2002–2003	Nick St. Nicholas (Steppenwolf) - bass, vocals; Michael Monarch (Steppenwolf) - guitar; Randy Meisner (Poco, Eagles) - bass, vocals; Rosilee - vocals; Kurt Griffey - guitar, vocals; Fergie Frederiksen (Toto) - vocals; Steve Stewart - keyboards, vocals; Ron Wikso (Foreigner) - drums; Randall Hall (Lynyrd Skynyrd) - guitar, vocals
2003–2005	Nick St. Nicholas (Steppenwolf) - bass, vocals; Michael Monarch (Steppenwolf) - guitar; Randy Meisner (Poco, Eagles) - bass, vocals; Rosilee - vocals; Fergie Frederiksen (Toto) - vocals; Steve Stewart - keyboards, vocals; Randall Hall (Lynyrd Skynyrd) - guitar, vocals; Dave Coyle - guitar, vocals; Aynsley Dunbar (Journey) - drums
2005–2007	Nick St. Nicholas (Steppenwolf) - bass, vocals; Michael Monarch (Steppenwolf) - guitar; Rosilee - vocals; Fergie Frederiksen (Toto) - vocals; Steve Stewart - keyboards, vocals; Randall Hall (Lynyrd Skynryd) - guitar, vocals; Dave Coyle - guitar, vocals; Aynsley Dunbar (Journey) - drums; Alex Ligertwood (Santana) - vocals
2007	Nick St. Nicholas (Steppenwolf) - bass, vocals; Michael Monarch (Stepenwolf) - guitar; Fergie Frederiksen (Toto) - vocals; Steve Stewart - keyboards, vocals; Randall Hall (Lynyrd Skynryd) - guitar, vocals; Dave Coyle - guitar, vocals; Aynsley Dunbar (Journey) - drums; Alex Ligertwood (Santana) - vocals
2008	Nick St. Nicholas (Steppenwolf) - bass, vocals; Michael Monarch (Steppenwolf) - guitar; Fergie Frederiksen (Toto) - vocals; Randall Hall (Lynryd Skynryd) - guitar, vocals; Dave Coyle - guitar, vocals; Aynsley Dunbar (Journey) - drums; Fran Cosmo (Boston) - vocals, guitar; Mark Hoyt - keyboards, vocals
2008–2012	Nick St. Nicholas (Steppenwolf) - bass, vocals; Michael Monarch (Steppenwolf) - guitar; Fergie Frederiksen (Toto) - vocals; Randall Hall (Lynyrd Skynyrd) - guitar, vocals; Dave Coyle - guitar, vocals; Aynsley Dunbar (Journey) - drums; Fran Cosmo (Boston) - vocals, guitar; Mark Hoyt - keyboards, vocals; Greg Walker (Santana) - vocals
2012–2013	Nick St. Nicholas (Steppenwolf) - bass, vocals; Michael Monarch (Steppenwolf) - guitar; Randall Hall (Lynyrd Skynyrd) - guitar, vocals; Dave Coyle - guitar, vocals; Aynsley Dunbar (Journey) - drums; Fran Cosmo (Boston) - vocals, guitar; Mark Hoyt - keyboards, vocals; Greg Walker (Santana) - vocals
2013–2015	Nick St. Nicholas (Steppenwolf) - bass, vocals; Michael Monarch (Steppenwolf) - guitar; Randall Hall (Lynyrd Skynyrd) - guitar, vocals; Dave Coyle - guitar, vocals; Aynsley Dunbar (Journey) - drums; Fran Cosmo (Boston) - vocals, guitar; Mark Hoyt - keyboards, vocals; Greg Walker (Santana) - vocals; Juan del Castillo - vocals, percussion
2015–present	Nick St. Nicholas (Steppenwolf) - bass, vocals; Michael Monarch (Steppenwolf) - guitar; Randall Hall (Lynyrd Skynyrd) - guitar, vocals; Aynsley Dunbar (Journey) - drums; Fran Cosmo (Boston) - vocals, guitar; Greg Walker (Santana) - vocals
