= Sheila MacLeod =

Scottish author and feminist

- Born: 23 March 1939 (age 87); Stornoway, Isle of Lewis, Outer Hebrides, Scotland
- Occupation: Writer

Sheila MacLeod (born 23 March 1939) is a Scottish author and feminist.

== Biography ==
Sheila MacLeod was born on 23 March 1939 in Stornoway, Isle of Lewis, Outer Hebrides, Scotland. She attended the Wycombe Abbey School in Buckinghamshire, England before completing her degrees in English in Somerville College, Oxford. She got her Bachelor's in 1961 and her Masters in 1993. MacLeod later completed a Bachelor's in French from Birkbeck College, University of London in 1996.

MacLeod wrote for a number of publications including The Times Literary Supplement, Vogue, The Observer, and the Evening Standard. She also worked for Clarendon Press. Her novels ranged from science fiction to the non fantastic. MacLeod wrote a BBC television play in 1965 and another play in 1985.

She married Manfred Mann singer Paul Jones in 1963, but they later divorced. In 2013, she moved from London to Shaftesbury, Dorset.

She is credited with writing the song "I Want to Know", recorded by Eric Clapton and the Powerhouse (c. 1967) and by Ten Years After (1967).

== Bibliography ==
=== Novels ===
- The Moving Accident (1968)
- The Snow-White Soliloquies (1970)
- Letters From the Portuguese (1971)
- Xanthe and the Robots (1976)
- Circuit-Breaker (1977)
- Axioms (1984)

=== Teleplays ===
- They Put You Where You Are (with Paul Jones, 1965)
- God Speed Co-operation (1985)

=== Non-fiction ===
- D.H. Lawrence's Men and Women (1985)
- The Art of Starvation: An Adolescence Observed (1981)
