= Every Little Bit Hurts =

1964 single by Brenda Holloway

Single by Brenda Holloway

from the album Every Little Bit Hurts
- B-side: "Land of a Thousand Boys"
- Released: March 26, 1964
- Genre: Pop-soul
- Length: 3:17
- Label: Tamla
- Songwriter: Ed Cobb
- Producers: Hal Davis, Marc Gordon

Brenda Holloway singles chronology
"I Ain't Gonna Take You Back" (1964)	"Every Little Bit Hurts" (1964)	"I'll Always Love You" (1964)

"Every Little Bit Hurts"

Single by Spencer Davis Group

from the album Their First LP
- B-side: "It Hurts Me So"
- Released: 5 February 1965
- Genre: Pop, rock
- Label: Fontana
- Songwriter: Ed Cobb
- Producer: Chris Blackwell

Spencer Davis Group singles chronology
"I Can't Stand It" (1964)	"Every Little Bit Hurts" (1965)	"Strong Love" (1965)

"Every Little Bit Hurts" was originally a 1964 hit single for Motown soul singer Brenda Holloway, written by Ed Cobb and featured on Holloway's album of the same name.

== Background ==
Though Brenda Holloway was against recording the song again (she had recorded it in 1962 for Del-Fi before signing with Motown), she reluctantly recorded the song and the label released it in the summer of 1964 on Tamla. "Every Little Bit Hurts" was a big hit peaking at No. 13 on the Billboard Hot 100, and became one of Holloway's trademark singles.

== Covers ==
- Aretha Franklin recorded the song on her 1964 album Runnin' Out of Fools
- The Spencer Davis Group version from their 1965 album Their First LP reached No. 41 on the UK singles chart in early 1965. and No. 9 in Canada in 1967.
- In 1968, Small Faces recorded the song and included on The BBC Sessions LP.
- Released in October 1976, it was covered by Graeme "Shirley" Strachan (lead singer of Skyhooks) as his debut solo release and peaked at No. 3 on the Australian Kent Music Report Singles Charts.
- British band The Clash recorded a cover of the song in 1980 for Sandinista!, but the track didn't make it onto the album. It was instead released in 1991 on the box set Clash on Broadway
- Etta James released the song on her collection How Strong is a Woman --- The Island Sessions in 1993.
- Petula Clark
- Gladys Knight & The Pips
- Cilla Black
- The Tremeloes
- Bobby Rydell

== Chart history ==
Brenda Holloway

Chart (1964)	Peak position
U.S. Billboard Hot 100	13
U.S. Cash Box Top 100	18

Spencer Davis Group

Chart (1965–1967)	Peak position
Canada Top Singles (RPM)	9
Canada Adult Contemporary (RPM)	2
UK Singles (Official Charts)	41

Graeme "Shirley" Strachan

=== Weekly charts ===
Chart (1976–1977)	Peak position
Australia (Kent Music Report)	3

=== Year-end charts ===
Chart (1976)	Position
Australia (Kent Music Report)	37
Chart (1977)	Position
Australia (Kent Music Report)	74

== Alicia Keys version ==
"Every Little Bit Hurts"

Promotional single by Alicia Keys

from the album Unplugged
- Released: 2006
- Recorded: July 14, 2005
- Studio: Brooklyn Academy of Music (New York)
- Genre: Soul
- Length: 4:01
- Label: J
- Songwriter: Ed Cobb

Music video
- "Every Little Bit Hurts" on YouTube

"Every Little Bit Hurts" was covered by American singer-songwriter Alicia Keys during her MTV Unplugged performance at the Brooklyn Academy of Music on July 14, 2005. The performance was subsequently included on Keys' live album Unplugged (2005), and released as a promotional single.

=== Critical reception ===
Sal Cinquemani from Slant Magazine felt that Keys treated the song "like [a] vocal audition[...] and not the blank canvas[...] of an interpretive artist".

=== Music video ===
Directed by Justin Francis, the video premiered on January 17, 2006 on BET's 106 & Park.

=== Track listing ===
- US promotional CD single
1. "Every Little Bit Hurts" (Radio Edit) – 3:58
2. "Every Little Bit Hurts" (Call Out Hook) – 0:10
3. "Every Little Bit Hurts" (Radio Edit) (MP3 format) – 3:58
