= The Ghost Goes Gear =

1966 British film by Hugh Gladwish

- DVD cover
- Directed by: Hugh Gladwish
- Written by: Roger Dunton; Lionel Hoare
- Produced by: Lionel Hoare; Harry Field
- Starring: Spencer Davis Group; Sheila White; Nicholas Parsons
- Cinematography: Peter Hendry; George Stevens
- Edited by: Ronald Glenister
- Music by: John Shakespeare
- Production company: Associated British-Pathé
- Distributed by: Warner-Pathé Distributors
- Release date: September 1966
- Running time: 79 minutes
- Country: United Kingdom
- Language: English

The Ghost Goes Gear is a 1966 British second feature ('B') musical comedy film directed by Hugh Gladwish and starring the Spencer Davis Group, Sheila White and Nicholas Parsons. It was written by Roger Dunton and Lionel Hoare.

== Plot ==
A music group go to stay at the childhood home of their manager, a haunted manor house in the English countryside.

== Cast ==
- The Spencer Davis Group as themselves
- Nicholas Parsons as Algernon Rowthorpe Plumley
- Sheila White as Polly
- Lorne Gibson as ghost / himself
- Arthur Howard as vicar
- Jack Haig as Old Edwards
- Joan Ingram as Lady Rowthorpe
- Tony Sympson as Lord Plumley
- Emmett Hennessy as Butch
- Robert Langley as little boy
- Bernard Stone as cockney dad
- Janet Davies as cockney wife
- Huw Thomas as news presenter
- St. Louis Union as themselves
- The Three Bells as themselves
- Dave Berry as himself
- Acker Bilk as himself

== Release ==
It was released in the UK as support to One Million Years B.C.

== Critical reception ==
The Monthly Film Bulletin wrote: "Pared down for release to little more than half its original length, this musical farrago is an embarrassingly artless affair, dolled up with all kinds of camera trickery but uncomfortably reminiscent of the "quota quickie"."

The Independent wrote: "The expression on Spencer Davis's face throughout the entire running time of The Ghost Goes Gear (1966) is truly memorable. Forget L'Anne dernire Marienbad [sic] – any film featuring Nicholas Parsons, Stevie Winwood and a bequiffed folk-singing ghost is truly challenging the boundaries of cinema."
