= The Spencer Davis Group =

British rock band

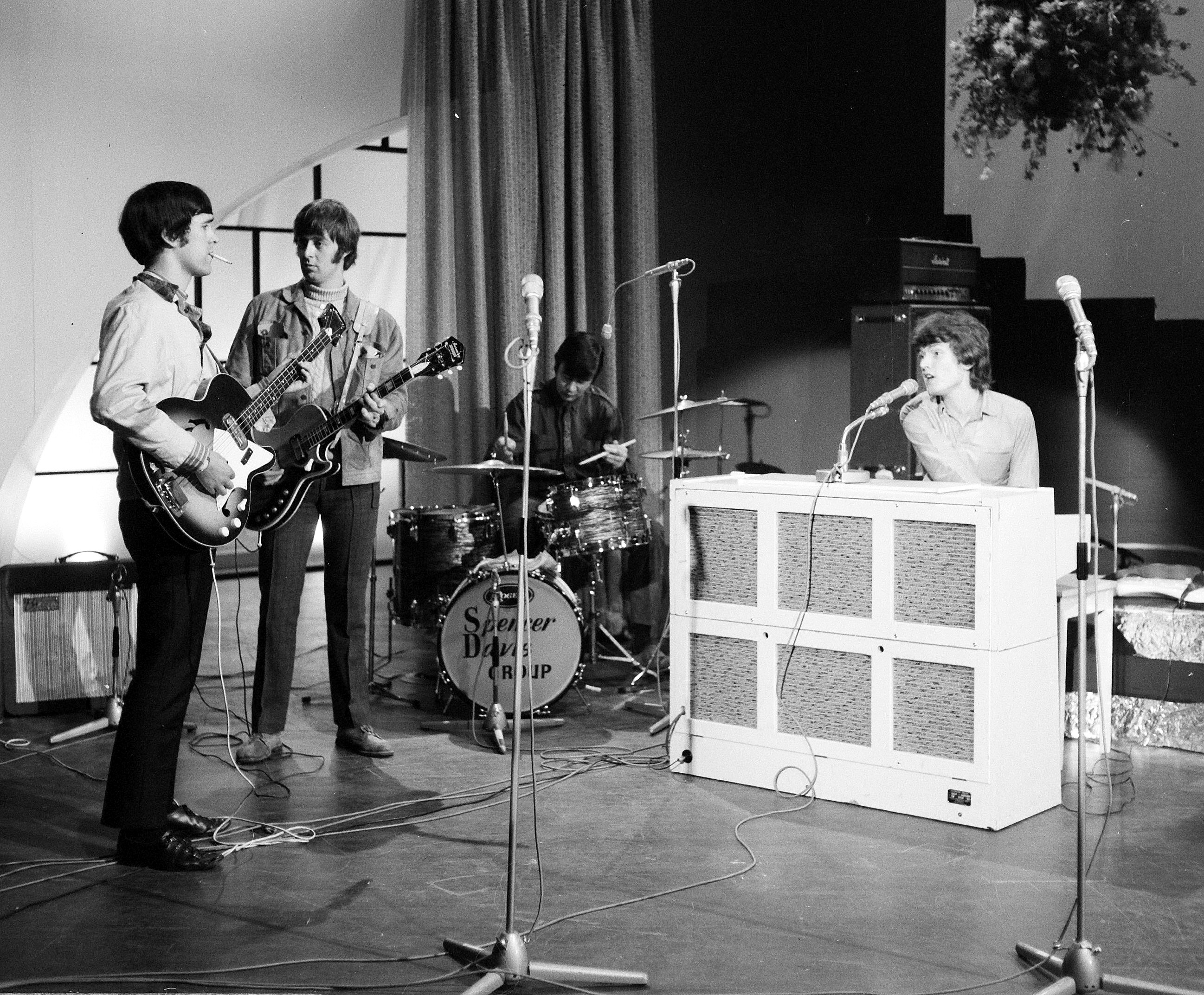
- The Spencer Davis Group rehearsing before a performance in Amsterdam in 1966; L-R: Muff Winwood, Spencer Davis, Pete York, and Steve Winwood

Background information
- Also known as: Spencer Davis R&B Quartet (1963–1964)
- Origin: Birmingham, Warwickshire, England
- Genres: Beat; R&B; blue-eyed soul; blues; rock
- Years active: 1963–1969; 1973–1974; 2006–2020
- Labels: Fontana; Island; United Artists
- Spinoffs: Eric Clapton and the Powerhouse; Traffic; Hardin and York; The Blueshounds; Class Rock All-Stars; World Classic Rockers
- Spinoff of: The Muff Woody Jazz Band
- Past members: Spencer Davis; Steve Winwood; Muff Winwood; Pete York; Eddie Hardin; Phil Sawyer; Ray Fenwick; Dee Murray; Dave Hynes; Nigel Olsson; John Hitchcock; Charlie McCracken; Jim Blair; Miller Anderson; Colin Hodgkinson; Steff Porzel; Ed Tree; Taras Prodaniuk; Jim Blazer; Tom Fillman
- Website: spencer-davis-group.com

The Spencer Davis Group were a British rock band formed in Birmingham in 1963 by Spencer Davis (guitar), brothers Steve Winwood (vocals, keyboards, and guitar) and Muff Winwood (bass guitar), and Pete York (drums). Their best known songs include the UK No. 1 hits "Keep On Running" and "Somebody Help Me" and the UK and US Top 10 hits "Gimme Some Lovin'" and "I'm a Man".

The Winwood brothers both left in 1967, with Steve going on to form the rock band Traffic, and Muff moving into music A&R and production. After releasing a few more singles and two more albums, the band split in 1969. Davis and York revived the group in 1973–1974, resulting in a further two albums. In 2006, the group was revived again, with Davis as the only original member, this time primarily as a touring act. Davis died on 19 October 2020, effectively ending the band.

== History ==
=== Formation ===
The Spencer Davis Group was formed in 1963 in Birmingham after Spencer Davis, a guitarist from Swansea, Wales encountered vocalist and organist Steve Winwood (then 14) and his bass playing brother Muff Winwood performing at a Birmingham pub, the Golden Eagle, as the Muff Woody Jazz Band. He recruited them and Pete York on drums to form the Rhythm and Blues Quartette, which performed regularly in the city.

In 1964, they signed their first recording contract after Chris Blackwell of Island Records saw them at an appearance in a local club; Blackwell also became their producer. Island was then a small independent label with UK Fontana contracted for distribution. Muff Winwood came up with the band's name, reasoning, "Spencer was the only one who enjoyed doing interviews, so I pointed out that if we called it the Spencer Davis Group, the rest of us could stay in bed and let him do them."

=== Breakthrough success ===
The group's first professional recording was a cover version of "Dimples", released as a single in 1964. In late 1965, they gained their first No. 1 single with "Keep On Running", written by reggae musician Jackie Edwards. In 1966, they followed this with another Jackie Edwards-written No. 1 hit "Somebody Help Me" and the Top 20 hit "When I Come Home", this song a collaboration between Edwards and Steve Winwood. "Keep On Running" and "Somebody Help Me" were issued as singles in the US on Atco during 1966, but due to lack of promotion, neither of them gained airplay or entered the American charts.

For the German market, the group released a medley of "Det war in Schöneberg, im Monat Mai" and "Mädel ruck ruck ruck an meine grüne Seite" (the first is from a 1913 Berlin operetta, the second is a Swabian traditional) as a tribute single for that audience, Davis having studied in West Berlin in the early 1960s. In late 1966 and early 1967, the group achieved two more hits with "Gimme Some Lovin'", which went Top 5, and "I'm a Man", which was in the Top 10.

Both of them sold over one million copies and were awarded gold record status. "Gimme Some Lovin'" was written by Davis and the Winwood brothers, while "I'm a Man" was written by Steve Winwood and the group's producer Jimmy Miller. The tracks proved to be their breakthrough in the US, where they were now signed to United Artists Records, both going Top 10 there.

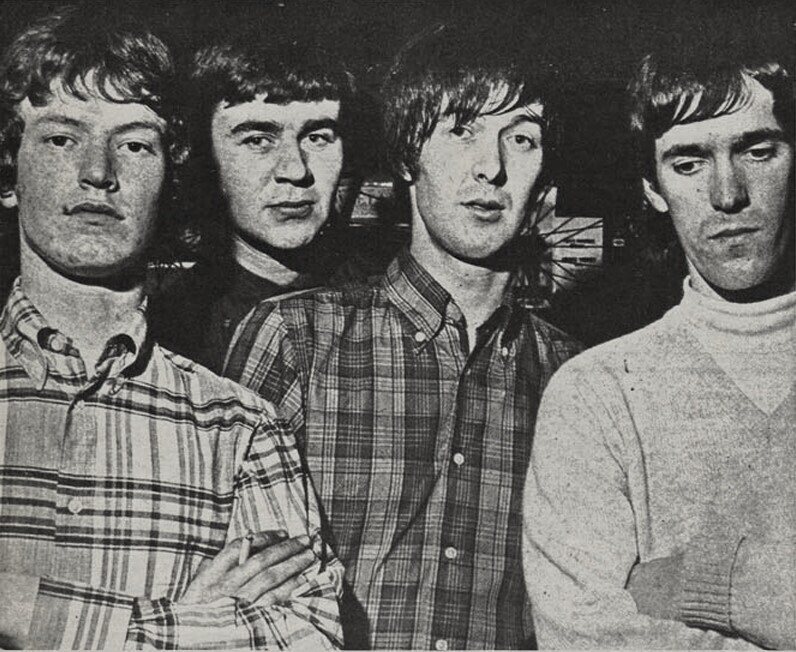
The Spencer Davis Group in mid-1966

In 1966, the group starred in The Ghost Goes Gear, a British musical comedy film, directed by Hugh Gladwish, and also featuring Sheila White and Nicholas Parsons. It was not well received and Winwood later considered it a career mistake.

=== Disbandment ===
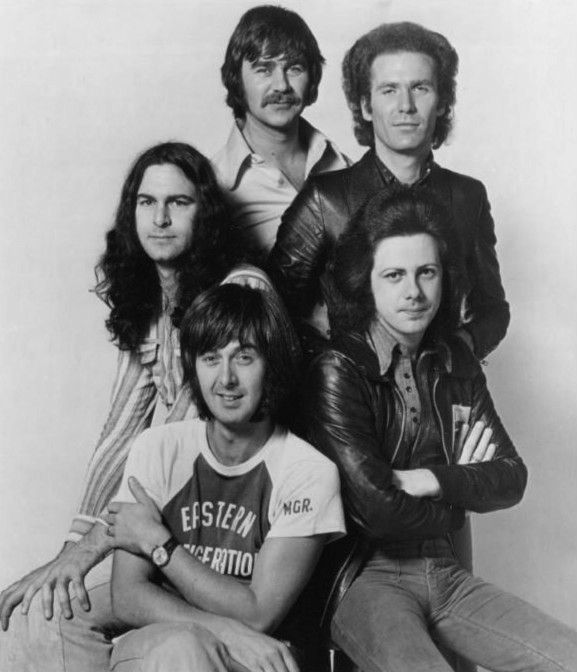
The Spencer Davis Group in 1974

Steve Winwood left the group in April 1967 to form Traffic; his brother, Muff, moved into the music industry working in artists and repertoire (A&R) at Island Records. In the same period, both the Spencer Davis Group and Traffic featured on the soundtrack of the film Here We Go Round the Mulberry Bush released in that year. After the Winwoods' departures, the Spencer Davis Group continued with the addition of guitarist Phil Sawyer (ex-Les Fleur de Lys) and keyboardist/vocalist Eddie Hardin (ex-A Wild Uncertainty). This line-up recorded several tunes for Here We Go Round The Mulberry Bush and released the psychedelia-sounding "Time Seller" single in July 1967; the b-side, "Don't Want You No More", also received radio airplay.

That was followed by "Mr. Second-Class" in late 1967, which received heavy airplay on Radio Caroline (a pirate radio ship off the British coast), and the album With Their New Face On in 1968. At that time Ray Fenwick had replaced Phil Sawyer. The group's last minor hit, "After Tea", was released at the same time by the German band The Rattles, providing competition that led finally to a temporary stop to all activities of the band. The song was originally recorded by the Dutch group After Tea, which included guitarist/singer Fenwick among its members.

After one further single ("Short Change"), Eddie Hardin and Pete York left to form the duo Hardin & York. They were replaced by future Elton John band member Dee Murray on bass and Dave Hynes on drums. Nigel Olsson, another future Elton John band member, replaced Hynes, and the line-up produced the album Funky in 1969 (only released in the USA on Date Records, a sub-label of Columbia Records in 1970) before splintering. Fenwick wrote all the songs and his 1971 solo album Keep America Beautiful, Get a Haircut also featured Murray and Olsson.

The group broke up on 19 July 1969.

=== Solo work and reunions ===
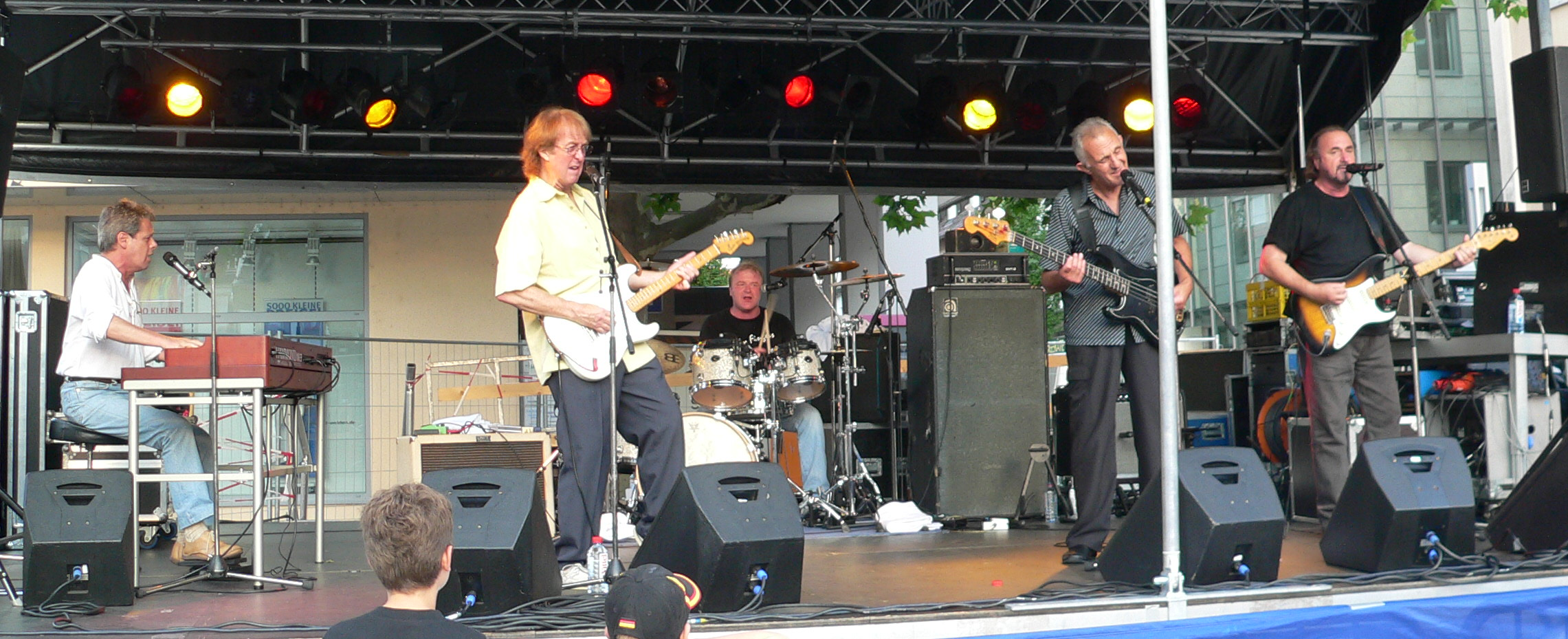
the Spencer Davis Group performing in 2006

The group reunited in 1973 with Davis, Fenwick, Hardin and York, and newcomer Charlie McCracken on bass. The group released the albums Gluggo (1973) and Living in a Back Street (1974) before again disbanding.

Davis continued working, however, producing some jazz-oriented albums in the late 1970s and early 1980s. On 7th July 1988 he appeared with Pete York (drums), Colin Hodgkinson (bass), Zoot Money (keyboards), and Miller Anderson (guitar) for an "R & B Reunion" at Birmingham Town Hall, introduced by Robin Valk and recorded for broadcast on BRMB Radio, Birmingham's independent local radio station. For the second half of the concert Chris Farlow joined the group.

The band re-formed in 2006, although only Davis and Hardin remained from the 1960s group line-ups. The Spencer Davis Group continued to tour the US and Europe, but with two differing line-ups; only Spencer Davis himself was present in both formations of the band. Hardin remained with the UK version of the band until his death in 2015. Davis died in Los Angeles on 19 October 2020, at the age of 81 while being treated for pneumonia.

== Cover versions of songs ==
The Spencer Davis Group–particularly its incarnation with Steve Winwood–proved to be influential, with many of the band's songs being recorded by other artists over the years. Among them are Chicago's cover of "I'm a Man"; The Allman Brothers Band's version of Davis's and Hardin's "Don't Want You No More" (both 1969); Three Dog Night's recording of "Can't Get Enough of It" (1970); and The Blues Brothers' "Gimme Some Lovin'" (1980).

The Grateful Dead covered Spencer Davis Group material in live performance on occasion. Spencer Davis performed "I'm a Man" with the Grateful Dead in a 1989 performance at Los Angeles's Great Western Forum.

== Band members ==
- Spencer Davis – rhythm guitar, backing and lead vocals, bass (1963–1969, 1973–1974; died 2020)
- Steve Winwood – lead vocals, lead guitar, keyboards (1963–1967)
- Muff Winwood – bass, backing vocals (1963–1967)
- Pete York – drums (1963–1968)
- Eddie Hardin – lead vocals, keyboards, bass pedals (1967–1969, 1973–1974; died 2015)
- Phil Sawyer – lead guitar, backing vocals (1967)
- Ray Fenwick – lead guitar, vocals (1967–1969; died 2022)
- Dee Murray – bass, backing vocals (1968–1969; died 1992)
- Dave Hynes – drums (1968)
- Nigel Olsson – drums (1968–1969)
- Charlie McCracken – bass, backing vocals (1973–1974)

== Discography ==
- Their First LP (1965)
- The Second Album (1966)
- Autumn '66 (1966)
- With Their New Face On (1968)
- Funky (1970)
- Gluggo (1973)
- Living in a Back Street (1974)
- Vibrate (1986)
