= Muff Winwood =

English musician and producer (born 1943)

- Winwood in 1966

Background information
- Born: Mervyn Winwood; 15 June 1943 (age 83); Erdington, Birmingham, England
- Genres: Rock; pop; jazz
- Occupations: Musician; backing vocalist; songwriter; record producer; music executive
- Instrument: Bass guitar
- Years active: 1961–present
- Formerly of: The Muff Woody Jazz Band; The Spencer Davis Group

Mervyn Winwood (born 15 June 1943), better known as Muff Winwood, is an English musician, songwriter and record producer. The elder brother of Steve Winwood, both were members of The Spencer Davis Group in the 1960s, in which Muff played bass guitar. Following his departure from the group he became an A&R executive and record producer.

== Early life ==
Mervyn Winwood was born in Erdington, Birmingham. Winwood's father, Lawrence, was a foundryman by trade, who also played tenor saxophone in dance bands and had a collection of jazz and blues records. The family moved from Handsworth to Atlantic Road, Kingstanding, Birmingham when Muff was a child.

Winwood attended Cranbourne Road Primary School and the new Great Barr School (one of the first comprehensive schools) and was a choir boy at St John's Church in the Perry Barr neighborhood of Birmingham. He first became interested in the guitar, then the bass. He was nicknamed "Muff" after the popular 1950s children's TV character Muffin the Mule.

== Career ==
=== The Spencer Davis Group ===
The Rhythm and Blues Quartette was formed in 1963 after Davis saw the Winwood brothers (Muff and Steve) at a Birmingham pub called the Golden Eagle, performing as the Muff Woody Jazz Band. At first, guitarist Spencer Davis was only interested in hiring Steve and "didn't care whether Muff came along or not." However, because Steve was only fifteen, he could not drive, and after Davis offered to personally drive him from place to place, Muff "jumped to the fore, ever sharp and said, "I will switch from guitar to bass and I have a driving license and I will bring him"", according to Davis. The group made their debut at the Golden Eagle and subsequently had a Monday-night residency there.

After recruiting drummer Pete York, the core lineup of the band was formed, and eventually Steve was made lead singer. Although Steve Winwood was lead singer, the group was renamed The Spencer Davis Group by Muff, according to him, because "Spencer was the only one who enjoyed doing interviews, so I pointed out that if we called it the Spencer Davis Group, the rest of us could stay in bed and let him do them."

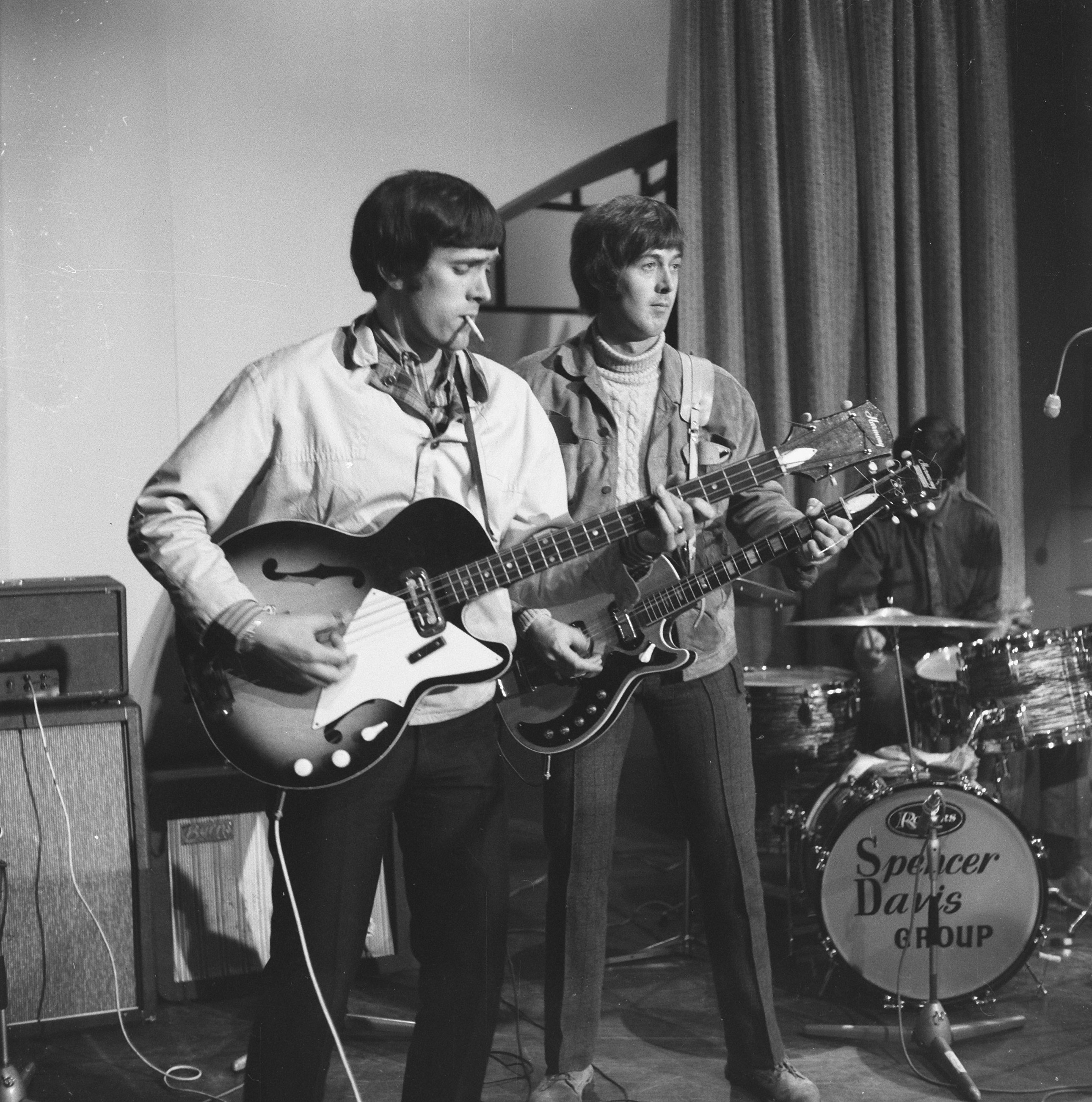
Winwood (on left) playing bass guitar for the Spencer Davis Group in Amsterdam, 1966

In 1964, they signed to Fontana Records. They would release two consecutive records that topped the UK charts in 1965 and 1966 respectively, "Keep On Running" and "Somebody Help Me". They are also known for their 1966 recording, "Gimme Some Lovin'", which went to number 2 in the UK, and was a US top ten.

In April 1967, Steve left the group and formed Traffic, and soon after, Muff left the group as well.

=== Record producer ===
After leaving the Spencer Davis Group in 1967, Winwood moved within the music industry to a position as A&R executive at Island Records. He was there until 1978, when he became an executive at the British office of CBS Records (which later became Sony Music), where he remained until well into the 1990s. As part of his A&R duties, Winwood signed Prefab Sprout, Terence Trent D'Arby, Sade, Shakin' Stevens and The Psychedelic Furs amongst others. He nearly signed on and managed Elton John, but contractual obligations prevented him.

In 1974, Winwood produced the Sparks hit album, Kimono My House along with its hit singles, "This Town Ain't Big Enough for Both of Us" and "Amateur Hour". "This Town Ain't Big Enough for Both of Us" contains sounds of gunshots, which was Winwood's idea; he bet Elton John that the song would be in the top 5 on the UK charts, which John betted against, and in the end, the song peaked at number two.

He also produced their other 1974 album, Propaganda (which included the "Never Turn Your Back on Mother Earth" single). Later, he produced the first Dire Straits album (1978).

His other work included production with The Fabulous Poodles, Marianne Faithfull, Nirvana (the UK band), Sutherland Brothers ("Sailing"), Traffic, Mott the Hoople, Bay City Rollers, Love Affair, Kevin Ayers, Patto, Unicorn, After the Fire and The Noel Redding Band.

He later became President of Sony UK’s A&R division and then managing director of Sony S2, eventually finishing his major label career in 2002 as President of UK Repertoire for Sony Music. He is also a honorary member of the British Record Producers Guild.

== Awards ==
On 2 November 2016, Winwood was declared an "A&R Icon" at that years A&R Awards.

Elton John has said of Winwood: "Muff winwood is without doubt one of the greatest A&Rs in the history of british music. He introduced me and millions of others to countless new talent. He was SO supportive of his acts. He was unbelievably helpful to me and Bernie in our early days which was invaluable and something I will never forget."

Dire Straits guitarist and lead vocalist Mark Knopfler said of Winwood: "I have happy memories of making the first Dire Straits album with Muff and Rhett Davies engineering in what was then Basing Street Studios off Ladbroke Grove. Muff was hard-working, straightforward and easy to work with and the album was recorded and mixed inside three weeks. I can still hear his Birmingham accent coming over the talk back after a take: ‘If we can’t make a record out of that we’re all custards.’ I still use that one now."

== Credits ==
=== Producer ===
Year	Title	Artist	Notes
1970	Patto	Patto	
1971	Patto	Hold Your Fire	
1971	Jimmy Cliff	Goodbye Yesterday	
1972	The Sutherland Brothers	The Sutherland Brothers Band	
1972	Patto	Roll 'Em, Smoke 'Em, Put Another Line Out	
1972	The Sutherland Brothers	Lifeboat	
1972	Mott the Hoople	All the Young Dudes	
1973	The Sutherland Brothers & Quiver	Dream Kid	
1974	Sparks	Propaganda	
1974	Sparks	Kimono My House	
1975	The Noel Redding Band	Clonakilty Cowboys	
1976	Kevin Ayers	Yes We Have No Mañanas (So Get Your Mañanas Today)	
1976	Dave Mason	Certified Live	
1977	Phillip Goodhand-Tait	Teaching an Old Dog New Tricks	
1977	Unicorn	One More Tomorrow	
1977	Milk 'N' Cookies	Milk 'N' Cookies	
1977	Deaf School	2nd Honeymoon/Don't Stop the World	
1978	Dire Straits	Dire Straits	
1979	Fabulous Poodles	Think Pink	
1980	Dire Straits	Making Movies	
1983	Kevin Ayers	The Kevin Ayers Collection	
1984	Hanoi Rocks	Two Steps from the Move	
1996	Russ Ballard	Winning/Barnet Dogs	
1999	Mark Knopfler	Metroland	
2002	Patto	Monkey's Bum	
2004	Tom Baxter	This Boy	
2007	Ebony Alleyne	Never Look Back	

== See also ==
- List of bass guitarists
