= Jackie Edwards (musician) =

Jamaican musician and songwriter (1938–1992)

- Born: Wilfred Gerald Edwards; 1938; Jamaica
- Died: 15 August 1992 (aged 53–54)
- Genres: Reggae
- Occupations: Musician, songwriter, record producer
- Years active: 1950–1992
- Label: Island

Wilfred Gerald "Jackie" Edwards (1938 – 15 August 1992), was a Jamaican musician, songwriter and record producer whose career took in ska, R&B, soul, rocksteady, reggae, and ballads.

== Career ==
Edwards was born in Jamaica in 1938 and grew up there with fourteen siblings. Strongly influenced by Nat King Cole, he began performing at the age of 14. Edwards came to the attention of Chris Blackwell in 1959. Edwards had four number-one singles in Jamaica between 1960 and 1961, all self-written ballads with Latin-influenced music.

When Blackwell set up Island Records in London in 1962, Edwards travelled with him. Edwards worked as a singer and songwriter for Island, recording as a solo artist and also duets with Millie Small, as well as performing duties such as delivering records. He wrote both "Keep On Running" and "Somebody Help Me", which became number-one singles in the United Kingdom for The Spencer Davis Group. He continued to work as a recording artist himself, with regular album releases through the mid-1980s. Much of his later work was produced by Bunny Lee. Edwards also worked with The Aggrovators; one of his most renowned songs he produced with that band was the roots sound systems favorite, a recut of Burning Spear's Invasion (Wadada). Dionne Bromfield covered his song "Oh Henry" on her album Introducing Dionne Bromfield in 2009.

Edwards worked as a producer, co-producing the 1977 album Move Up Starsky by The Mexicano. The majority of his catalog is published through Fairwood Music (UK) Ltd.

Edwards died in August 1992 from a heart attack.

== Discography ==
=== Albums ===
- The Most of Jackie Edwards (1963) – Island
- Stand Up for Jesus (1964) – Island
- Come on Home (1965) – Island
- By Demand (1966) – Island
- Pledging My Love (1966) – Island (with Millie Small)
- Premature Golden Sands (1967) – Island
- Put Your Tears Away (1969) – Island
- I Do Love You (1972) – Trojan
- Do You Believe in Love (1976) – Klik
- African Language (1977) – Harry J Records
- Let It Be Me (1978) – Jamaica Sound (with Hortense Ellis)
- Tell Me Darling (1978) – Imperial
- Sincerely (1978) – Trojan
- Come to Me Softly (1979) – Third World
- Nothing Takes the Place of You (1981) – Starlight
- King of the Ghetto (1982) – Black Music
- Tell It Like It Is (1982) – Starlight
- Love & Affection (1983) – Sky Note (feat. Kate Swadling)
- The Original 'Mr. Cool Ruler' (1983) – Vista Sounds
- The Dynamic Jackie Wilfred Edwards (1984) – Boss
- Musical Treasures Disco Style (198?) – Imperial
- Endless Love (1986) – World Enterprise
- Heart to Heart (1990) – Justice
- Escape (1995) – Peter Pan Industries
- Dearest (1995) – Lagoon
- In Paradise (1995) – Carl's Records

=== Compilation albums ===
- The Best of Jackie Edwards (1966) – Island
- The Best of Jackie & Millie (1967) – Trojan (with Millie Small)
- 20 Greatest Hits (1977) – Conflict
- Starlight (1978) – Pye
- 20 Super Hits (19??) – Sonic Sounds
- In Paradise (1994) – Trojan
- Memorial (19??) – Rhino
- Singing Hits from Studio One and More (1995) – Rhino
- Great Soul Hits: Put Your Tears Away (1997) – Marginal
- This Is My Story: A History of Jamaica's Greatest Balladeer (2005) – Trojan
- I Feel So Bad (2006) – Castle
- 50 Greatest Hits (2013) – Alexander Music Group

== See also ==
- List of reggae musicians
