= Spencer Davis =

Welsh musician (1939–2020)

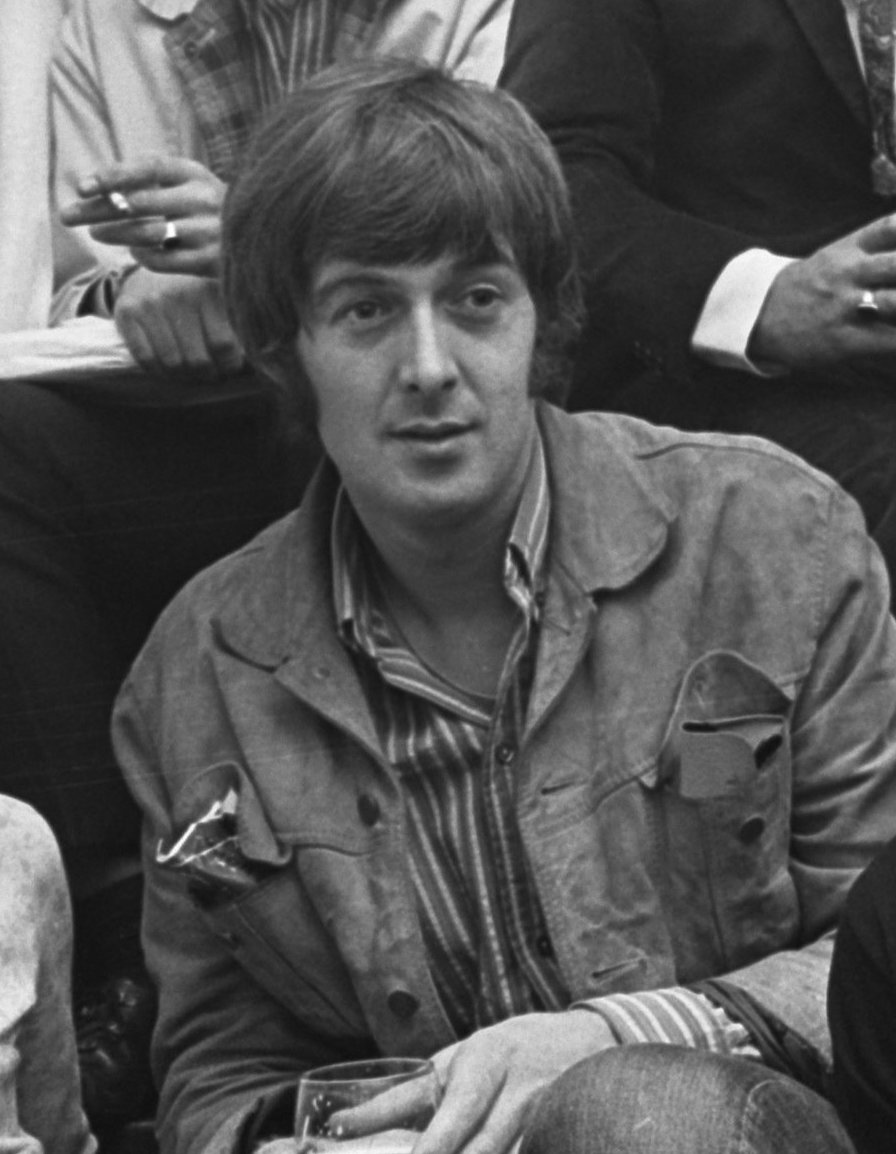
- Davis in 1966

Background information
- Born: Spencer David Nelson Davies; 17 July 1939; Swansea, Wales
- Died: 19 October 2020 (aged 81) Los Angeles, California, U.S.
- Genres: Rock; pop; rhythm and blues
- Occupation: Musician
- Instruments: Guitar; vocals; harmonica
- Years active: 1963–2020
- Labels: Fontana; United Artists
- Formerly of: The Muff Woody Jazz Band; The Spencer Davis Group; Class Rock All-Stars; World Classic Rockers
- Website: spencer-davis-group.com

Spencer Davis (born Spencer David Nelson Davies; 17 July 1939 – 19 October 2020) was a Welsh musician. He founded the Spencer Davis Group, a band that had several hits in the 1960s including "Keep On Running", "Somebody Help Me", "Gimme Some Lovin'" and "I'm a Man" all sung by Steve Winwood. Davis subsequently enjoyed success as an A&R executive with Island Records.

== Early life ==
Davis was born in Swansea, south-west Wales, on 17 July 1939. His father was a paratrooper during World War II. While his father was away, his uncle Herman was a musical influence on Davis, teaching him how to play the harmonica at age six. While growing up in Swansea, Davis lived through The Blitz: "The bombed city centre was my playground. I watched the town being absolutely destroyed." Davis's mother continued to live in the West Cross area of Swansea until her death.

He began learning to play harmonica and accordion at the age of six. He attended Dynevor School in Swansea and became proficient at speaking a few languages. He moved to London when he was 16 and began working in the civil service as a clerical officer at the Post Office Savings Bank in Hammersmith and then for HM Customs and Excise. However, he went back to his old school to study for A-levels in languages, becoming head boy in 1959.

In 1960, he moved to Birmingham, to read German at the University of Birmingham. In music circles, Davis was later known as "Professor".

== Career ==
=== Early music career ===
His early musical influences were skiffle, jazz, and blues. Musical artists who influenced Davis include Big Bill Broonzy, Huddy Ledbetter, Buddy Holly, Davey Graham, John Martyn, Alexis Korner, and Long John Baldry. By the time he was 16, Davis was hooked on the guitar and the American rhythm and blues music making its way across the Atlantic. With few opportunities to hear R&B in South Wales, Davis attended as many local gigs as practical.

When Davis moved to Birmingham as a student, he often performed on stage after his teaching day. While in Birmingham, he formed a musical and personal relationship with Christine Perfect who was later a member of Chicken Shack and then Fleetwood Mac. He was also in a band called The Zodiacs.

At some point in his early career, he chose his stagename, Spencer Davis, by simply dropping the 'e' from his surname, as a way to properly aid people as to how his surname was pronounced.

=== The Spencer Davis Group ===
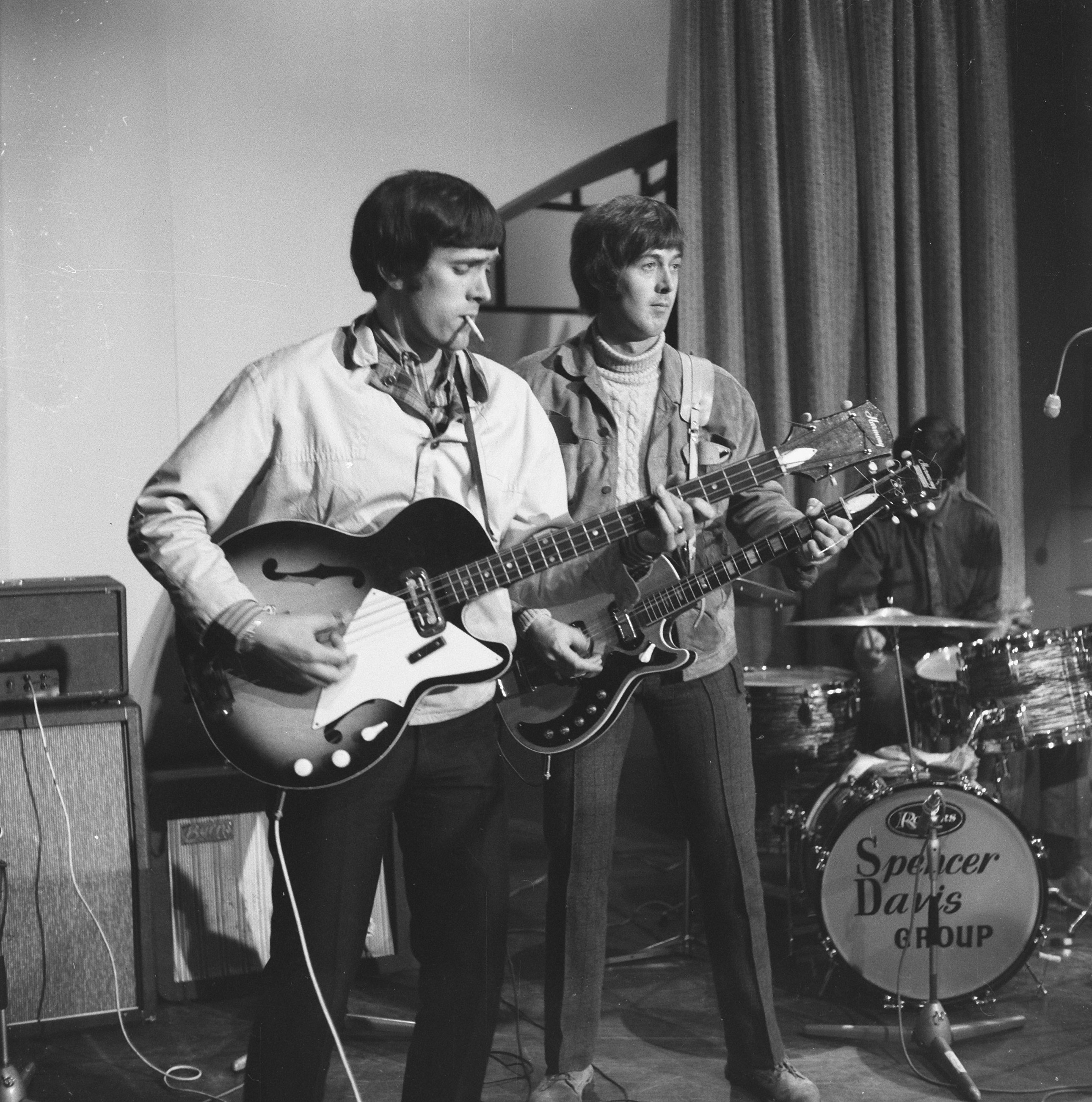
Davis (centre) rehearsing in Amsterdam (1966) with Muff Winwood on bass and Pete York on drums. (Steve Winwood is not pictured)

In 1963, Davis went to the Golden Eagle pub in Birmingham to see the Muff Woody Jazz Band, a traditional jazz band featuring Muff Winwood and his younger brother, Steve Winwood. Davis persuaded them to join him and drummer Pete York as the Rhythm and Blues Quartet. Davis performed on guitar, vocals and harmonica, Steve Winwood on guitar, organ and vocals, Muff Winwood on bass and Pete York on drums. They adopted the name the Spencer Davis Group, despite the fact that Davis was not the frontman, but instead Steve Winwood, who at the time of his hiring in 1963 was just fifteen years old. According to Muff, this name choice, which was thought up by him, was because "Spencer was the only one who enjoyed doing interviews, so I pointed out that if we called it the Spencer Davis Group, the rest of us could stay in bed and let him do them."

The group's live reputation attracted the attention of Island Records founder Chris Blackwell who signed the group to its first contract and became their manager. The group had No. 1 hits in the UK with consecutive single releases in 1965 and 1966 with "Keep On Running" and "Somebody Help Me". They are also known for their 1966 recording, "Gimme Some Lovin'", which went to number 2 in the UK, and was a US top ten.

The Spencer Davis Group continued after Winwood left to form Traffic in April 1967. The group recorded two more albums before splitting up in 1969. Another version of the group with Davis and York appeared in 1973 and disbanded in late 1974. Various incarnations of the band toured in later years under Davis's direction.

=== Solo career ===
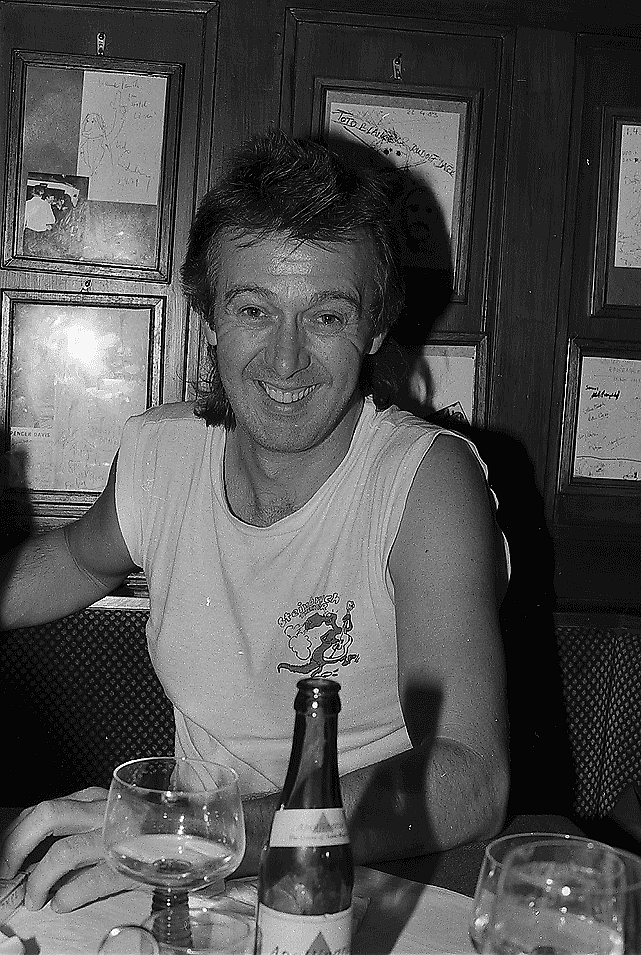
Davis in 1986

After the group broke up, Davis moved to California and recorded an acoustic album with Peter Jameson, It's Been So Long, for Mediarts in mid-1971. He followed it with a solo album, Mousetrap, for United Artists, produced by and featuring Sneaky Pete Kleinow. Neither album sold well. Soon after, he moved back to the UK, formed a new Spencer Davis Group and signed with Vertigo Records. In addition, Davis was an executive at Island Records in the mid-1970s.

As a promoter for Island Records, Davis worked with Bob Marley, Robert Palmer, and Eddie and the Hot Rods as well as promoting the solo career of former Spencer Davis Group member Steve Winwood.

In 1993, Davis formed the supergroup the Class Rock All-Stars. He left the group in 1995 to form World Classic Rockers with former Eagles bassist Randy Meisner, ex Toto singer Bobby Kimball, and ex Moody Blues and Wings guitarist Denny Laine.

=== Later life ===
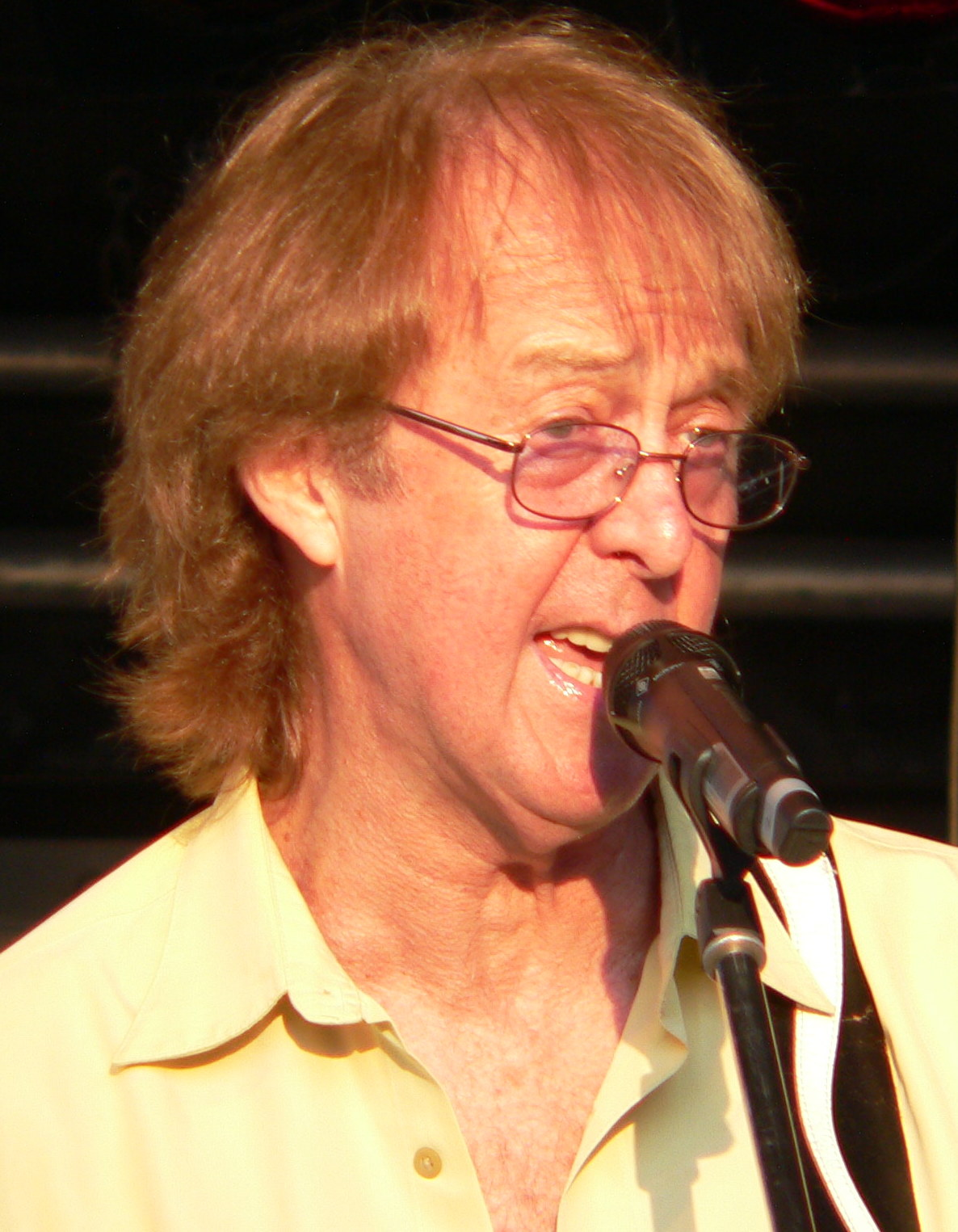
Davis performing in 2006

Davis reformed the Spencer Davis Group officially in 2006, and toured around Europe and America until his death. In later interviews, Davis expressed how he often felt overshadowed by the precocious presence in his band of the teenage prodigy Steve Winwood, who tended to receive most of the press coverage and fan attention.

During the summer of 2012, the Catalina Island Museum hosted an exhibition called "Gimme Some Lovin': The Spencer Davis Group", to celebrate Davis's musical career. To complement the museum show, the museum also hosted a symposium on "The British Invasion", where Davis was joined on a panel by, among others, Micky Dolenz of the Monkees and a July Fourth concert featuring Davis singing his hits with a backing band named 'The Catalina All Stars'.

== Personal life ==
Davis is survived by his partner, June Dante, three children, Lisa, Sarah and Gareth, and five grandchildren.

Davis was a supporter and honorary member of the Wales nationalist party, Plaid Cymru. From the mid-1970s onwards, Davis lived in Avalon on Catalina Island, a small island off the coast of Southern California.

Davis retained an affinity for Germany. He had studied German and played in clubs in Berlin early in his career. He watched both the building of the Berlin Wall in 1961 and its fall in 1989.

== Death ==
Davis died from pneumonia in Los Angeles on 19 October 2020 at the age of 81.

== Discography ==
=== As Spencer Davis ===
==== Studio Albums ====
Year	Title	Details
1971	It's Been So Long	With Peter Jameson; Released: 1971; Label: Mediarts
1972	Mousetrap	Released: 1972; Label: United Artists
1984	Crossfire	Released: 1984; Label: Allegiance Records
2006	So Far	Released: 2006; Label: Varèse Sarabande

==== Singles ====
Year	Title	Details
1971	It's Been So Long	With Peter Jameson; Released: 1971; Label: Mediarts
1972	Tried	Released: 1972; Label: United Artists
1972	Easy Rider	Released: 1972; Label: United Artists
1973	Rainy Season	Released: 1973; Label: United Artists
1984	Private Number	With Dusty Springfield; Released: 1984; Label: Allegiance
