= Somebody Help Me =

Single by the Spencer Davis Group

from the album Autumn '66
- B-side: "Stevie's Blues"
- Released: 18 March 1966
- Genre: British R&B, blue-eyed soul
- Label: Fontana (UK); Atco (US)
- Songwriter: Jackie Edwards
- Producer: Chris Blackwell

The Spencer Davis Group singles chronology
"Keep on Running" (1965)	"Somebody Help Me" (1966)	"When I Come Home" (1966)

"Somebody Help Me" is a single by the Spencer Davis Group, which was released in 1966. As with "Keep on Running", it was composed by Jackie Edwards.

== Chart performance ==
"Somebody Help Me" became the band's second consecutive and last number-one hit in the UK Singles Chart, staying at the summit for two weeks in April 1966. In the US, the song peaked at number 47 in July 1967. On the New Zealand listener chart it peaked at 20.

== Cover versions ==
- The Everly Brothers also released a version on their album Two Yanks in England, released in mid 1966.

== Song in popular culture ==
- It was used as the theme tune to the 1960s-era hospital-based ITV drama series The Royal, which ran from 2003 to 2011, and its short-lived spin-off The Royal Today, which first aired in 2008.
