= Keep On Running =

1965 single by Jackie Edwards

Song by Jackie Edwards

from the album Come on Home
- Released: 1965
- Recorded: 1965
- Genre: Reggae
- Label: Island
- Songwriter: Jackie Edwards
- Producer: Chris Blackwell

"Keep On Running" is a song written and first recorded by Jackie Edwards. It became a hit in the UK for the Spencer Davis Group; their version reached number one in the charts.

== Recordings ==
"Keep On Running" was written by Jamaican singer-songwriter Jackie Edwards, who as well as having been a singer, worked in the UK for Island Records as a songwriter. The song was recorded by Edwards for his album Come on Home, released in 1965, and he recorded it again in the mid-1970s for his album Do You Believe in Love.

=== The Spencer Davis Group version ===
"Keep On Running"

Single by the Spencer Davis Group
- B-side: "High Time Baby"
- Released: 26 November 1965
- Recorded: 21 October 1965
- Genre: Pop rock; blues rock; beat; blue-eyed soul; British R&B
- Label: Fontana TF632 (UK); Atco 45-6400 (US)
- Songwriter: Jackie Edwards
- Producer: Chris Blackwell

The Spencer Davis Group singles chronology
"Strong Love" (1965)	"Keep On Running" (1965)	"Somebody Help Me" (1966)

The song was recorded by the Spencer Davis Group and released as a single in November 1965 on Fontana Records, backed with "High Time Baby". At the time, Chris Blackwell, who produced the recording, was trying to establish his Island label in the UK and was managing the Spencer Davis Group. Scala Brown Associates loaned him money for the song in exchange for a substantial portion of his record label as collateral; thanks to the single's success, he was able to rapidly pay back the loan. It was a number one hit on the UK Singles Chart in January 1966. In the United States it reached number 76. On The New Zealand Listener charts it peaked at #4.

Personnel

- Steve Winwood – lead guitar, lead vocals
- Spencer Davis – rhythm guitar, backing vocals
- Muff Winwood – bass guitar
- Pete York – drums, percussion
- Adrian Kerridge – sound engineer

This version was included in the soundtrack of the film Buster (1988) and was used during the film's opening sequence that saw Buster Edwards (Phil Collins) steal a suit from a shop window for a friend's funeral.

The song was also included in the 2007 romantic comedy Run Fatboy Run directed by David Schwimmer.

=== John Alford version ===
A version of the song was a UK hit for John Alford in 1996, released as a double A-side with "If", and peaking at number 24.

=== Other versions ===
Several recordings in other languages were released internationally in early 1966.

Tom Jones recorded a version for his 1967 covers album 13 Smash Hits. This version was used during the end credits of the 2025 version of The Running Man.

The US rock group The Outsiders released the song as the first track on their debut LP, Time Won't Let Me.

Patrick Samson and Les Phéniciens realized a cover in Italian titled "Chi può dirmi" ("Who can tell me") (Philips, 373 741 BF) with lyrics by Maurizio Vandelli for the 1998 compilation Beat 600 - 60's & 70's golden nuggets tracks (Mercury Records, 565365 - 2).

"Keep On Running" has also been recorded by other artists including Robben Ford (as the title track of his 2003 album), The Romantics (on Live on Stage), and Queen's drummer Roger Taylor, during the recording session of his second solo album Strange Frontier in 1984.
