= Moonbound =

- Theatrical release poster
- Directed by: Ali Samadi Ahadi
- Written by: Ali Samadi Ahadi; Arne Nolting
- Based on: Little Peter's Journey to the Moon by Gerdt von Bassewitz
- Starring: Aleks Le; Raphael von Bargen; Drew Sarich; Cindy Robinson
- Music by: Ali N. Askin
- Production companies: Brave New Work; Coop99 Filmproduktion; Little Dream Entertainment
- Distributed by: Sola Media (International sales); Filmladen (Austria); Warner Bros. (Germany)
- Release dates: 24 June 2021 (Australia); 31 March 2022 (Germany and Austria)
- Running time: 84 minutes
- Countries: Germany; Austria
- Language: German
- Budget: €7,600,000
- Box office: €8,810,767

Moonbound (German: Peterchens Mondfahrt) is a 2021 animated fantasy adventure comedy film directed by Ali Samadi Ahadi with story by Ahadi and Arne Nolting and based on the 1915 children's book Little Peter's Journey to the Moon by Gerdt von Bassewitz.

== Plot ==
Years ago, Mr. Zoomzeman, a June bug with his wife lives in a birch tree populated by insects. One day, while the Zoomzemans get engaged and married during a wedding ceremony, the ceremony is interrupted by the arrival of a boss, alongside his two henchmen, who seizes the tree. Zoomzeman goes to a creek at a full moon, where he is taken to a nightfairy, and shares about what's happening. The nightfairy realizes about this, and, in anger, banishes the boss and the tree to the moon, leaving Zoomzeman homeless. The nightfairy informs him that the tree can be restored to its original place if an animal-loving human accompanies him.

In the present, Peter is a space loving boy, who lives with his sister Annabelle. One day, Zoomzeman arrives at their home, where he enlists both kids to head to the moon. Both kids are separated; Peter meets a sandman, while Annabelle, along with a group of star children, are abducted by the boss, now under the new name, the Moonman, along with his henchmen, who force them to work for him. Peter, Zoomzeman, and the Sandman, determined to rescue Annabelle, visit the nightfairy at her palace, where Peter tells her about Annabelle's kidnapping. The nightfairy agrees to allow Peter to head to the moon.

Meanwhile, Annabelle and Ms. Zoomzeman discover the Moonman's plan to fire a cannon at the nightfairy's palace at sunrise as revenge on her. Both end up imprisoned by the Moonman, but are quickly freed by Peter, Mr. Zoomzeman, and the Sandman. Ms. Zoomzeman reconciles with her husband, while Annabelle tells Peter about the Moonman's plan.

Peter, Annabelle, the Zoomzemans, and the Sandman arrive and confront the Moonman, but Peter is unable to stop the cannon in time. Although the palace is slightly damaged, the nightfairy is enraged about the Moonman's plan, prompting her to banish him to Mars, before bringing the birch tree back to its original place on Earth. Peter and Annabelle return home, while the Zoomzemans feel happy about their birch tree being back.

== Cast ==
Character	(Germany) Original German	(United States) English dub
Peter	Dirk Petrick	Aleks Le
Annabelle	Roxana Samadi	Lilian Gartner
Mr. Zoomzeman	Peter Simonischek	Howard Nightingall
Sandman	Raphael von Bargen (credited as Raphael van Bargen in US dub)	
Moonman	Tom Vogt	Drew Sarich
Nightfairy	Gerti Drassl	Cindy Robinson
Lightning Witch	Unknown	Melissa Mabie (credited as Mellisa Mabei)

== Production ==
The film is a German-Austrian co-production and is produced by Brave New Work in Cologne, Coop99 Filmproduktion in Vienna and Little Dream Entertainment in Hamburg. The animation was a split between Cologne-based Red Parrot Studios and D-Facto Motion in Cologne, Fish Blowing Bubbles in Munich, K-Effects in Vienna, ACHT.STUDIO in Frankfurt and Sophie Animation in Dalian. While the soundtrack was recorded by the Vienna Radio Symphony Orchestra.

== Release ==
The film was first released in Australia on 24 June 2021. It was later released in Germany and Austria on 31 March 2022.

== Reception ==
The film received negative reviews, with 17% score on Rotten Tomatoes according to 6 reviews.

== See also ==
- Peter in Magicland
