= Kohnstamm =

Kohnstamm is a German Jewish surname. Notable people with the surname include:

- Oskar Kohnstamm (1871–1917), German neurologist and psychiatrist
  - Kohnstamm's phenomenon, namesake neurophysiological phenomenon
- Max Kohnstamm (1914–2010), Dutch diplomat and historian
- Thomas Kohnstamm (born 1975), American writer
