= Little Peter's Journey to the Moon =

1912 German fairy tale

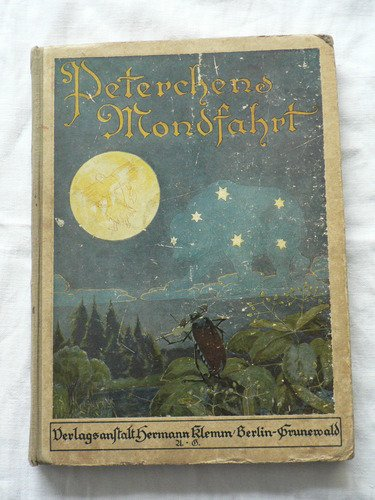
Original book cover from 1915

Little Peter's Journey to the Moon (German: Peterchens Mondfahrt) is a fairy tale written by German author and playwright Gerdt von Bassewitz. It was first performed as a play in Leipzig in 1912 and appeared in 1915 as a storybook for children with illustrations by Hans Baluschek. A 2007 English translation names the book Peter and Anneli's Journey to the Moon.

It is the story of Little Peter and his sister Anneli, who help a May beetle named Mr. Zoomzeman (German: Herr Summsemann) to retrieve his missing sixth leg from the Moon. After a fantastic and dangerous overnight adventure they recover the leg and are returned to their beds at home.

== Plot ==
A thief, stealing wood in the forest, had cut off Mr. Zoomzeman's great-great-grandfather's sixth leg many years before. The Night Fairy banished the thief to the Moon as punishment, but he took the leg with him, causing later generations of the Zoomzeman family to only have five legs.

The current Mr. Zoomzeman can break the curse and recover his missing leg if he finds two children who are pure of heart and have never been cruel to animals. He enters the house of Little Peter and his younger sister Anneli (Anneliese) and tells them the story. They promise to help him retrieve the lost leg. Mr. Zoomzeman teaches them a magical chant that allows them to fly and they set off for the Moon.

On the Moon they meet the Sandman, who looks after the star children, each corresponding to a child on Earth. As their own stars are untarnished and shine brightly it proves Peter and Anneli are pure of heart. The Sandman is impressed and offers to take the three heroes to the Night Fairy's tea party at her castle.

They travel in Sandman's celestial chariot, along the Milky Way, where the children learn about cosmic phenomena.

Meanwhile, the Night Fairy has invited many celestial guests to her midnight party. These include the thunder man (Donnermann), the wind bride (Windliesel), the cloud woman (Wolkenfrau), the lightning witch (Blitzhexe), Rainy Fritz (Regenfritz), the gale giant (Sturmriese), Hail Hans (Hagelhans), Mother Hulda (Frau Holle), Ice Max (Eismax), the vodyanoy (Wassermann), Mary-of-the-dew (Taumariechen), morning glory (Morgenröte), the afterglow (Abendröte), the morning star (Morgenstern) and the evening star (Abendstern) and the Queen of the Day (die Sonne). The Guardian of the Milky Way appears and complains about the chaos caused by the guests travelling to the meeting. The guests apologize and offer the guardian gifts.

Sandman and the adventurers arrive, surprising the guests as he is never usually late and by bringing humans. Mr. Zoomzeman's sad story prompts the celestial spirits to offer help. The Night Fairy asks the Guardian of the Milky Way to summon the Great Bear. Peter, Anneli and Mr. Zoomzeman are carried by the bear to the Moon cannon, via a meadow where gifts and sweets are grown for Christmas and past the nest where a hen lays colourful Easter eggs. The cannon fires the adventurers up onto a hill where the lost sixth leg is nailed to a sacred birch tree.

At the tree the heroes are confronted by the Man in the Moon, a cruel, violent cannibal. In the fight to prevent the children from being eaten the celestial spirits attack the Man in the Moon and Peter battles with his wooden toy sword. Anneli summons her and Peter's stars, who blind the Man in the Moon. The evil giant cannot see and gets lost in the deep moon woods.

Little Peter retrieves the sixth leg and Anneli attaches it to the unconscious beetle. Mr. Zoomzeman wakes and is delighted, but they must return to Earth immediately to avoid being stuck on the Moon forever. He uses an old charm which creates a hole. The children jump into the hole and fall back into their bedroom on Earth.

Dawn breaks and the children open the window to let Mr. Zoomzeman fly away. Their mother enters the bedroom bringing a gift of gingerbread from Father Christmas.

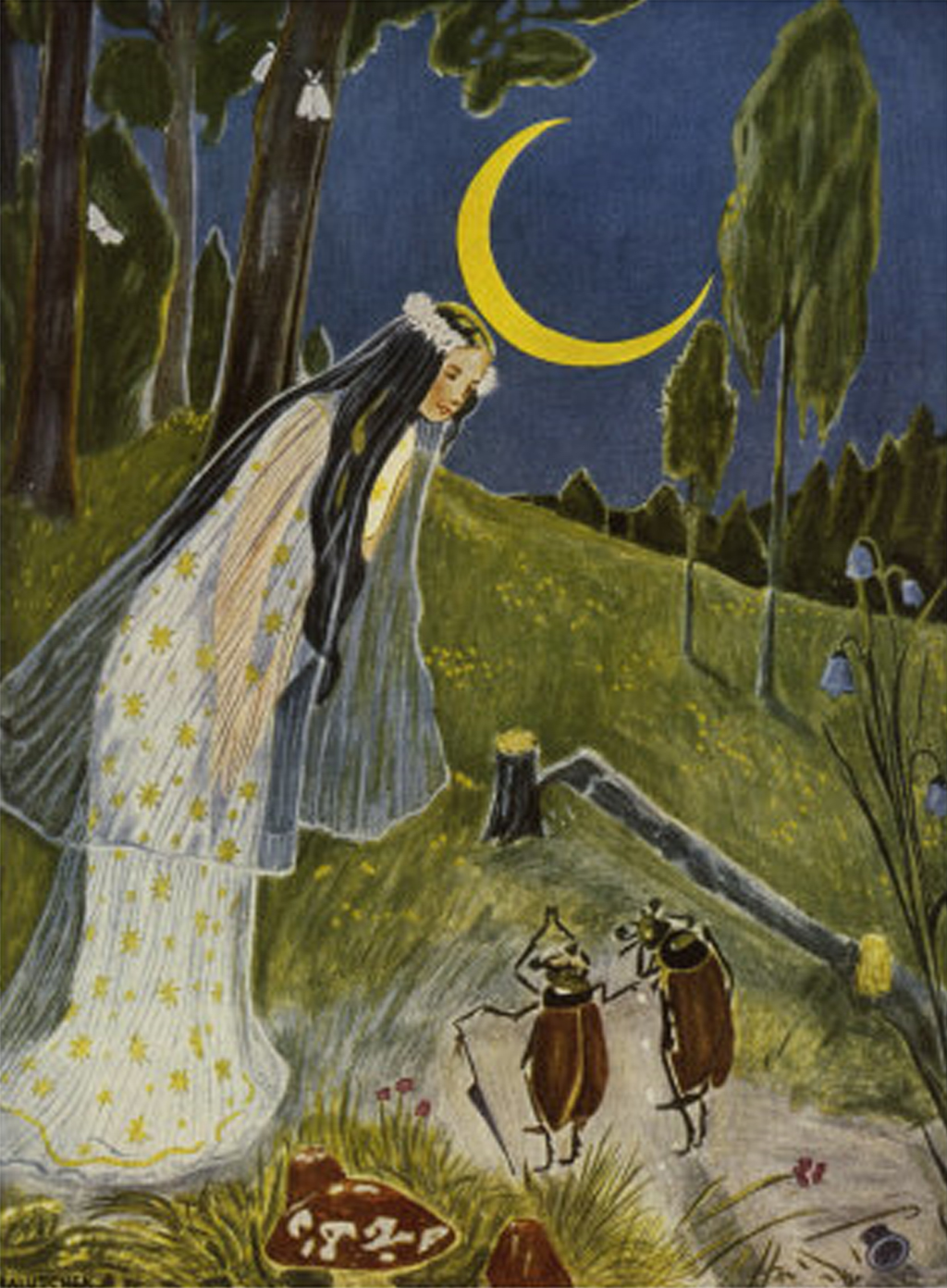
The Night Fairy

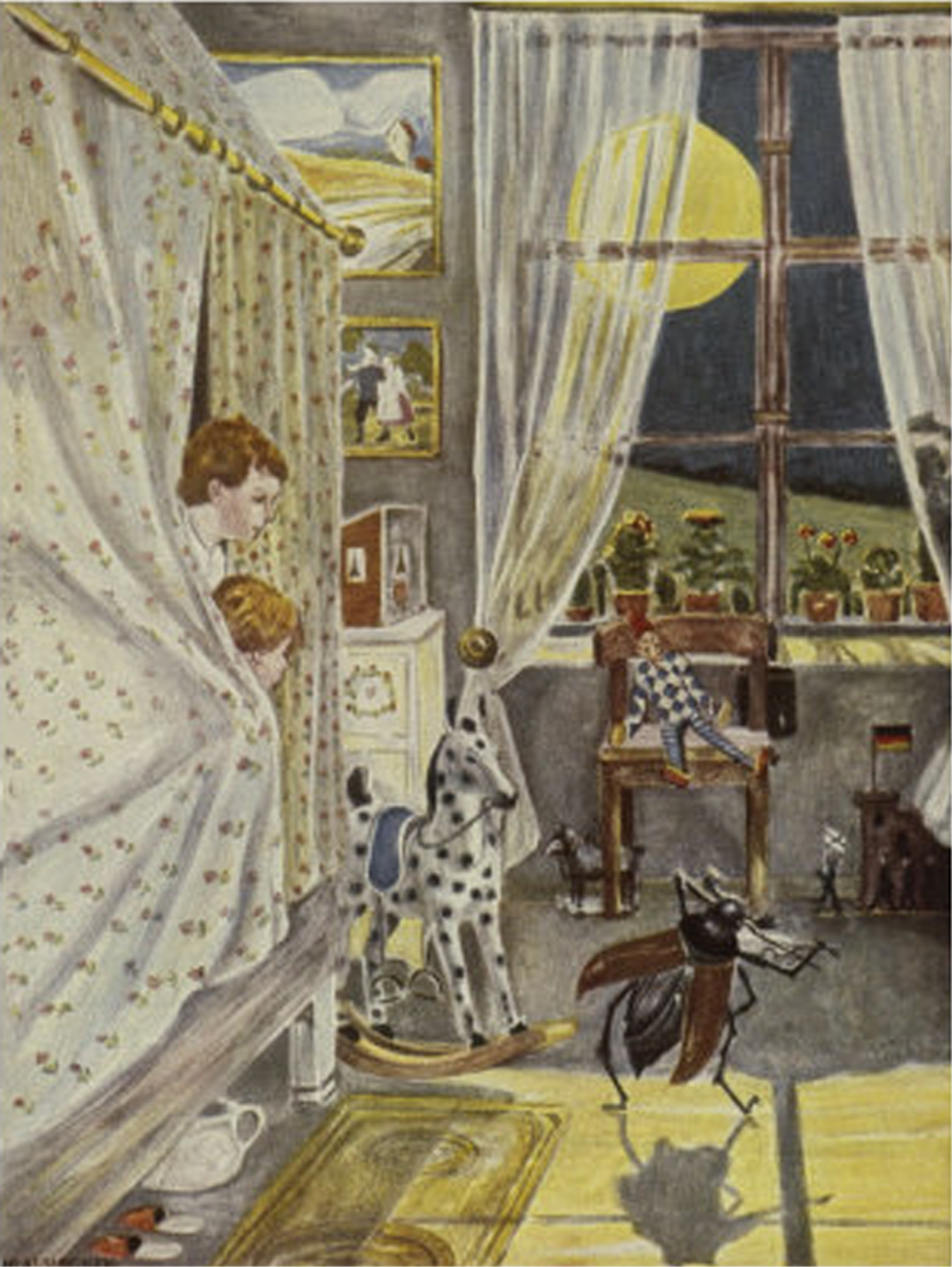
Meeting the children

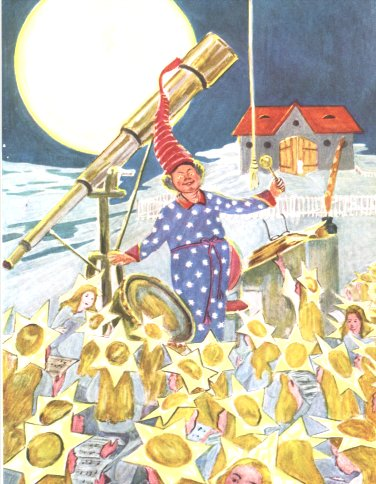
Star Meadow

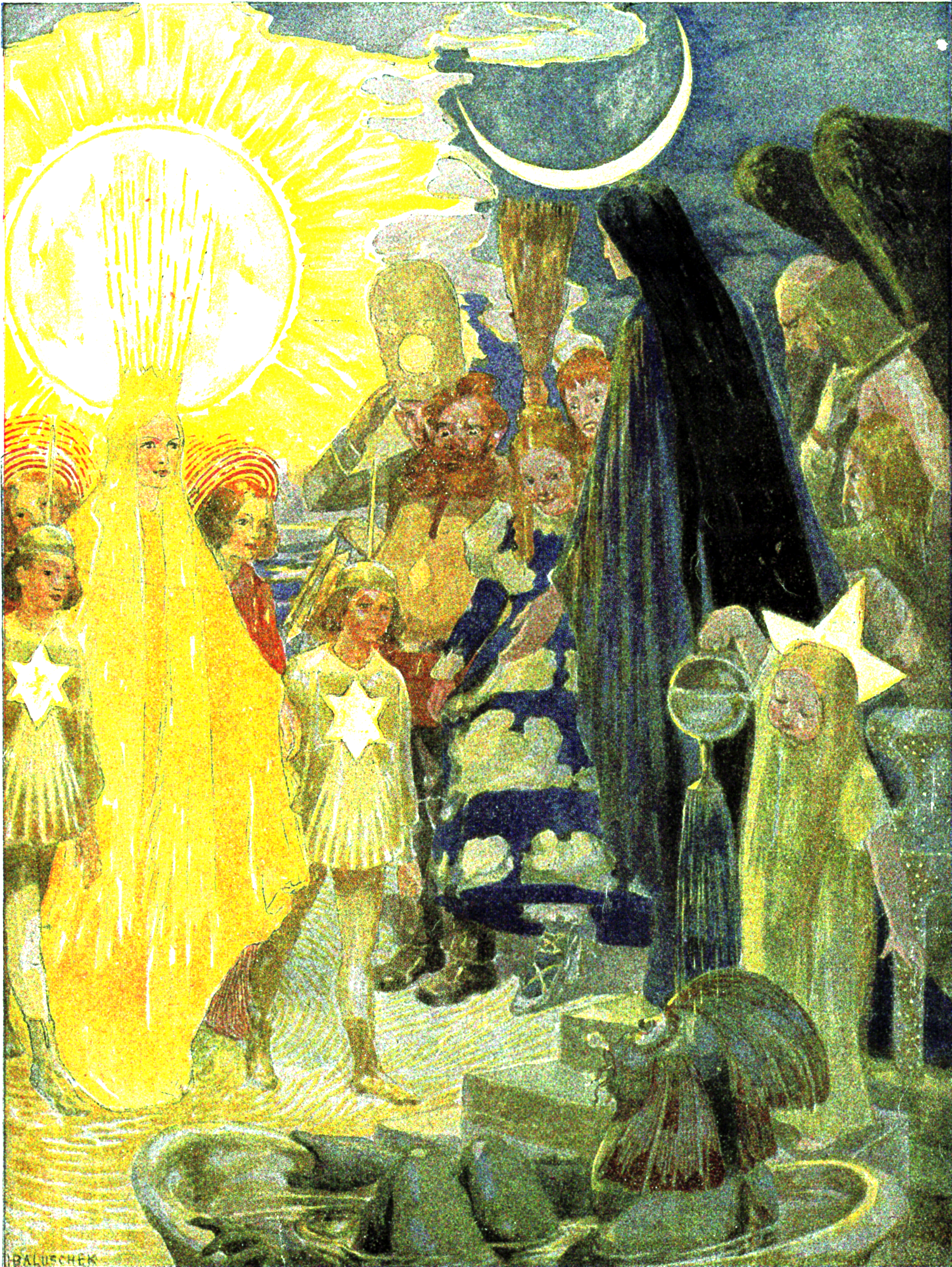
The Castle of the Night Fairy

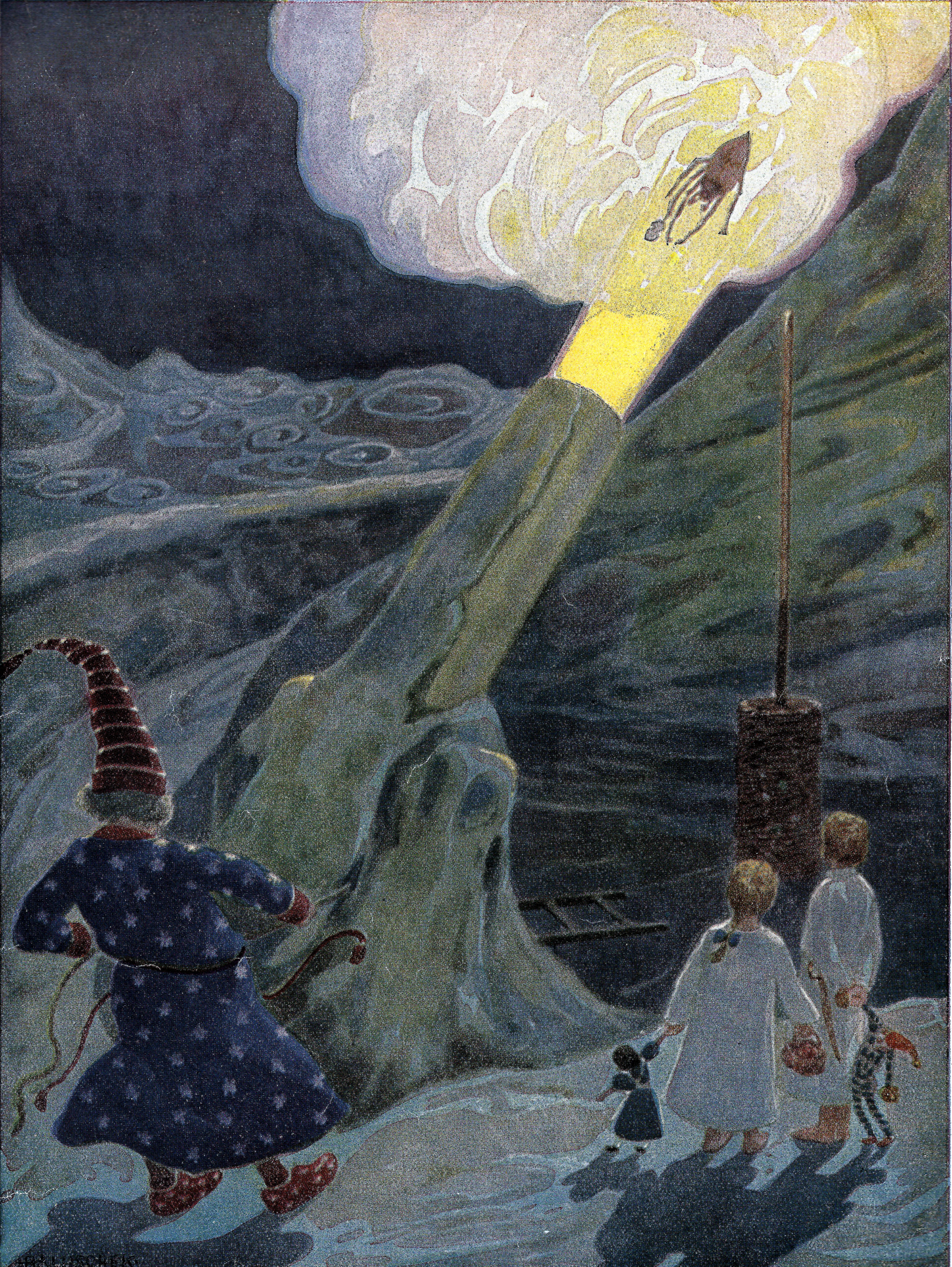
The Moon Cannon

== Background ==
In 2010 a biography of Otto Klemperer by Eva Weissweiler published in Germany stated that Peter and Anneli were based on the children of Oskar Kohnstamm, in whose sanatorium von Bassewitz had been a patient. Peter Kohnstamm (1908–1995) was the father of Angus Konstam.

== Film adaptations ==
A German television film based on the book first aired on Nordwestdeutscher Rundfunk in 1959. A 1990 animated film was directed by Wolfgang Urchs (Stowaways on the Ark), and released in English as Peter in Magicland. A 2021 animated movie Moonbound directed by Ali Samadi Ahadi was released in English.
