= The Seasons (2025 film) =

2025 Portuguese docufiction film

- Promotional poster
- Portuguese: As Estações
- Directed by: Maureen Fazendeiro
- Screenplay by: Maureen Fazendeiro
- Produced by: Luís Urbano; Sandro Aguilar; Valentina Novati; Beli Martínez; Lukas Valenta Rinner
- Starring: Simão Ramalho; Cláudio da Silva; Ana Potra; Manuel Leitão; António Sozinho
- Cinematography: Robin Fresson; Marta Simões
- Edited by: Telmo Churro; Maureen Fazendeiro
- Music by: Luís J Martins
- Production companies: O Som e a Fúria; Norte Productions; Filmika Galaika; Nabis Filmgroup
- Distributed by: Norte Distribution (France); Desforra Apache (Portugal); Square Eyes
- Release dates: 11 August 2025 (Locarno); 3 December 2025 (France)
- Running time: 82 minutes
- Countries: Portugal; France; Spain; Austria
- Languages: Portuguese; German

The Seasons (Portuguese: As Estações) is a 2025 docufiction film written and directed by Maureen Fazendeiro in her directorial feature debut. The film traces the passage of seasons while exploring both the documented and fictional histories of Portugal's Alentejo region and its successive inhabitants.

An international co-production, the film had its world premiere at the 78th Locarno Film Festival on 11 August 2025, in the Main Competition section, where it competed for Golden Leopard.

== Synopsis ==
The documentary unfolds as a layered exploration of the Alentejo region in Portugal, intertwining its historical narrative and local folklore through the lens of two German archaeologists. Their story is complemented by testimonies from rural inhabitants, archival field notes, scientific illustrations, amateur recordings, and artistic interpretations."

== Cast ==
- Simão Ramalho
- Cláudio da Silva
- Ana Potra
- Manuel Leitão
- António Sozinho

=== Voices ===
- Gerti Drassl
- Michaela Caspar
- Raphael von Bargen
- Toni Slama
- António Abel
- Simão Romeu

== Production ==
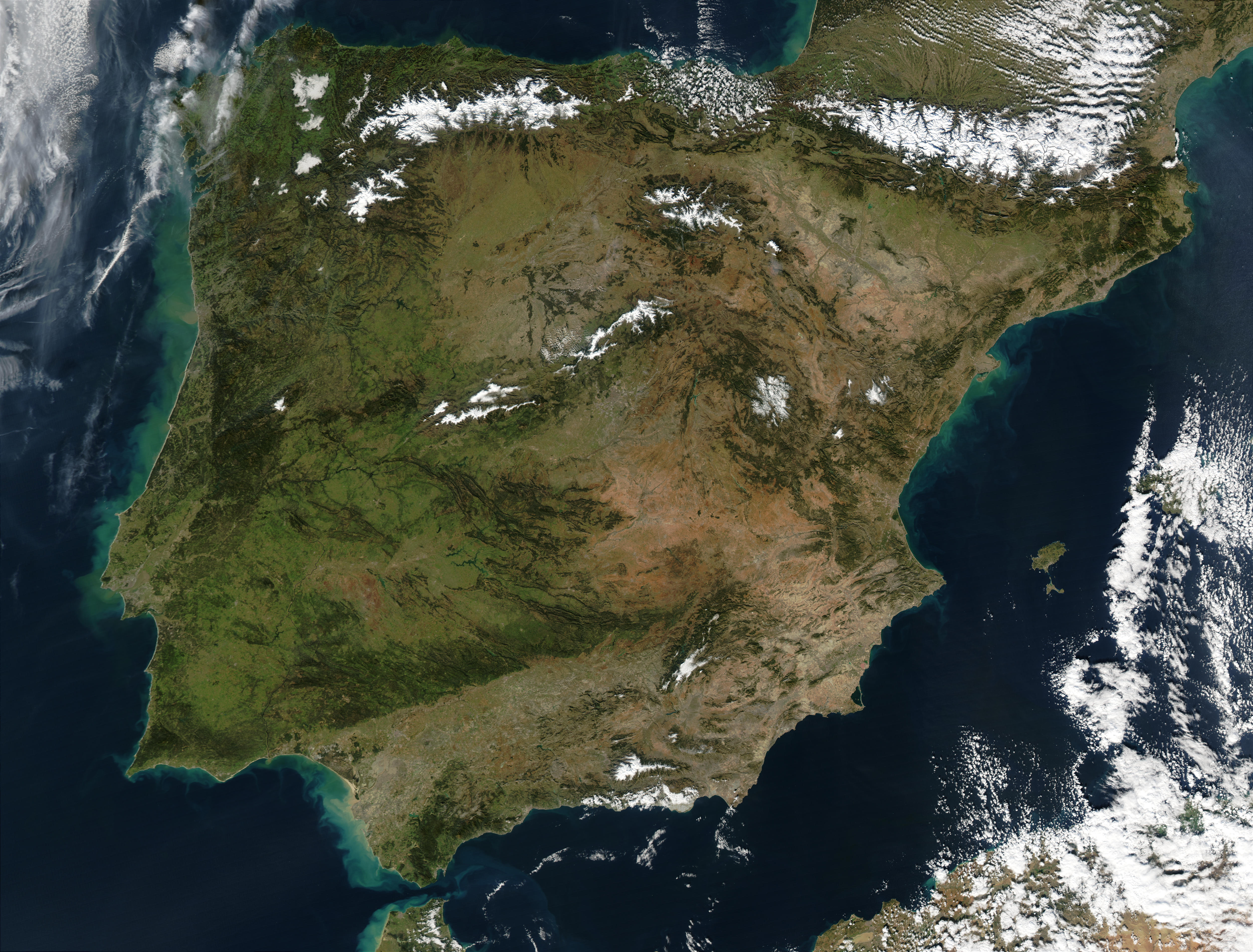
Satellite image of the Iberian Peninsula in January 2003

Development

The director and writer of the film Maureen Fazendeiro in an interview to the Variety said that She inspired by the legacy of archaeologists Georg and Vera Leisner—who "made the first inventory of megalithic monuments of the Iberian Peninsula, a work still very important today to understand the dawn of the European civilization". She retraced their journey through the Alentejo region. She further said, that there, she "met shepherds, archaeologists, poets, rural workers, trees and stones" and sought to "reassemble the historical time from those fragments," blending poetic observation with archaeological inquiry.

In July 2022, the film project was selected in FIDLab 2022 projects, the co-production incubator of French festival FIDMarseille, and won Sublimages prize in the showcase, known for its focus on experimental documentary and fiction features.

In 2023, the project was presented in The Ventura co-production market, which is supported by Institute of Cinematography and Audiovisual Arts, run in the collaboration of the Concello de Tui and Play-Doc, Tui International Film Festival.

The film was supported by the MEDIA Programme of the European Union, MEDIA sub-programme of Creative Europe, which is designed to support the European film and audiovisual industries, under its Development Support funding line.

== Release ==
The Seasons had its World Premiere at the 78th Locarno Film Festival on 11 August 2025, and competed for Golden Leopard.

The film was also screened in Wavelengths section of the 2025 Toronto International Film Festival on 11 September 2025 for its North American Premiere. It also competed in New Directors Competition at the São Paulo International Film Festival and had screening on 21 October 2025.

It was screened in the 'Time of History Section' of the 70th Valladolid International Film Festival on 28 October 2025, and at the International Documentary Film Festival Amsterdam on 14 November 2025 in the Paradocs section.

On 23 January 2026, it was screened at the Gothenburg Film Festival and on 21 April 2026, at the 41st Guadalajara International Film Festival in Ibero-American Documentary Feature Film section.

The film is distributed by Norte Distribution in France and Desforra Apache in Portugal.

It was released by Norte Distribution in French cinemas on 3 December 2025.

Vienna-based sales company Square Eyes acquired the international sales rights of the film in July, before its world premiere at the Locarno Film Festival.

== Accolades ==
Award	Date of ceremony	Category	Recipient	Result	Ref.
Locarno Film Festival	16 August 2025	Golden Leopard	The Seasons	Nominated	
Doclisboa	26 October 2025	Portuguese Authors Society Portuguese Competition Jury Award	The Seasons	Won	
