= Navíd Akhavan =

Iranian-German actor and film director

Navid Navid
- نوید اخوان
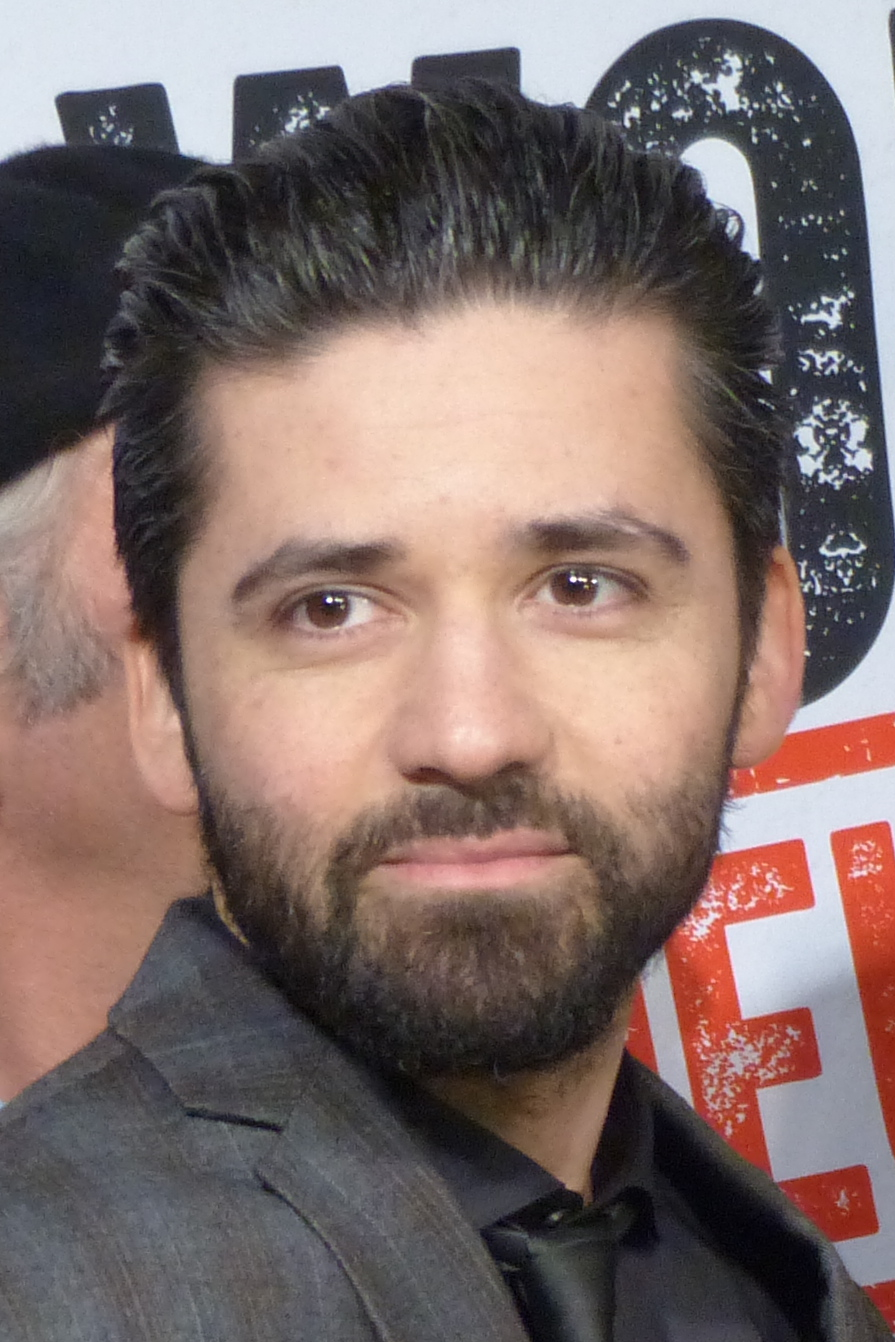
- Born: 9 June 1980 (age 46); Tehran, Iran
- Other name: Navid Akhavan
- Occupation: Actor / Director
- Years active: 2001–present
- Awards: Audience Award at the UMFF 2014
- Website: https://www.navidnavid.com/

Navid Akhavan (Persian: نوید اخوان; born 9 June 1980 in Tehran) is an Iranian-German actor and film director. He is also known as Navid Navid.

Navid was born in Teheran, Iran. Due to the Iran–Iraq War, Navid, aged 4, escaped with his family from his native country. After briefly living in the United States, they immigrated to Germany in 1985.

Navid grew up speaking English, German, and Persian. Due to his father's profession, an event manager, he was introduced to the stage and audience from an early age. He performed on stage for the first time when he was eight years old. Until the age of 16, he was the opening act of dozens of concerts.

After he graduated in 2001 from the "Schauspiel Zentrum", a school for performing arts in Cologne, Germany, he started to work as an actor in film, TV and theatre. He played the role of Lady Macbeth in William Shakespeare's Macbeth and Romeo in Romeo and Juliet at the Altonaer Theater in Hamburg, Germany.

In 2003, his first leading role in a film earned him a nomination at the Munich Film Festival in the category "Best Actor in a Leading Role" for his portrayal of Yunes in Elmar Fischer's Fremder Freund. In the same year, the film won the acclaimed First Steps Award, the Digital Visions Award, as well as the Audience Award at the Filmz Mainz Film Festival.

His other leading roles include Mohsen in Salami Aleikum and Jamal in 45 Minutes to Ramallah (both comedies directed by Ali Samadi Ahadi), as well as the drama For a Moment, Freedom (written and directed by Arash T. Riahi), which won 30 awards at international film festivals and was the Austrian entry for the Academy Awards in 2009. Navid has worked on films in German, Persian and English. In the Hollywood production Septembers of Shiraz, which can be seen on Netflix, he plays the part of Morteza next to Adrien Brody and Salma Hayek.

From 2005 until 2010, Navid and his brother Omid produced Persian pop music as "Navid & Omid". They released two studio albums (Faryad & Kolli Sefaresh), as well as several music videos during that time, all of which Navid wrote and directed.

Navid has also been working as a music video director for other singers. He has won awards at international film festivals with the music videos November's Fall and Habs, which he made for the Iranian legendary singer Ebi. The acclaimed music video Behesht, which Navid wrote and directed for the Iranian superstar Googoosh, gathered international attention since it was the first time a homosexual love story was portrayed in an Iranian music video. Some of the international articles include the Los Angeles Times, The Guardian, Die Welt, The World, De Volkskrant, The Times of Israel, Huffpost and Euronews.

Navid is also a guest teacher and gives workshops on how to direct actors and produce music videos at the SAE Berlin.

In 2020, he narrated Dalia Sofer's novel Man of My Time for Audible.

== Filmography (selection) ==
  - 2001: Anam
  - 2001: Happy Halloween
  - 2002: Drei Frauen, ein Plan und die ganz große Kohle
  - 2003: SK Kölsch
  - 2003: Fremder Freund
  - 2003: Wolffs Revier
  - 2004: SOKO Köln
  - 2005: Playa del futuro
  - 2005: Fremde Haut
  - 2005: König von Kreuzberg
  - 2006: SOKO Kitzbühel
  - 2007: Großstadtrevier (Episode Rufmord)
  - 2008: In letzter Sekunde
  - 2008: Ein Augenblick Freiheit
  - 2009: Women Without Men – Zanan-e Bedun-e Mardan
  - 2009: Salami Aleikum
  - 2010: Der Kriminalist (Episode Schuld und Sühne)
  - 2012: Mordkommission Istanbul (Episode Blutsbande)
  - 2012: Tatort (Episode Ein neues Leben)
  - 2012: Pastewka (Episode Die Lesung)
  - 2013: 45 Minuten bis Ramallah
  - 2013: 300 Worte Deutsch
  - 2014: Die Mamba
  - 2015: Septembers of Shiraz
  - 2017: Vacation from Life
  - 2018: Alarm für Cobra 11 – Die Autobahnpolizei (Episode Hooray for Bollywood)
  - 2018: Tatort (Episode Borowski und das Haus der Geister)
  - 2019: Die Spezialisten - Im Namen der Opfer
  - 2020: Professor T.
  - 2020: Trespassers
  - 2021: Nachtschicht

=== Awards ===
- Nomination at the Filmfest Munich for his performance in Fremder Freund (Category: Best Actor in a Leading Role)
- Audience Award at the UMFF for the music video Habs
