= SoundTrack Cologne =

Film conference in Cologne, Germany

- Genre: Film music, Game music, Media music, Sound design
- Frequency: Annual
- Locations: Cologne, Germany
- Years active: 2004–present
- Founded: 2004
- Website: www.soundtrackcologne.de

SoundTrack Cologne is a conference for music and sound in film, video games and media which has been held annually in Cologne, Germany, since 2004.

== Overview ==
SoundTrack Cologne is Europe's largest congress for music and sound in film, games and media. In some 50 round tables, panels, workshops and networking events, the focus is on current developments in the culture, law, marketing and technics of media music as well as business cases, professionalization and networking.

== SEE THE SOUND ==
SEE THE SOUND, the film programme of SoundTrack Cologne, shows the broad array of connecting image and sound and brings films about music to the big screen.

== European Education Alliance for Music and Sound in Media ==
EEAMS supports educators, students and industry professionals in the areas of filmmaking, sound design and media music composition and seeks to forge an inclusive framework to support collaborative links and to bridge interdisciplinary boundaries.

== Awards ==
- SoundTrack Cologne Lifetime Achievement Award
- Peer Raben Music Award
- WDR Filmscore Award
- European Talent Award: Best Sound Design
- See The Sound Music Documentary Award
- Award for the Best German Live Music TV-Show

=== Award Winners 2004 ===
- Juhan Vihterpal (Estonia) - New Sound in European Film
- Tom Werner, Michael Schlappa & Ralf Herrmann (Germany) – European Talent Award: Best Sound Design

=== Award Winners 2005 ===
- Maria Ushenina (Russia) – New Sound in European Film
- Christopher Wilson (Great Britain) – European Talent Award: Best Sound Design
- Dimitri Dodoras (Germany) - Skoda SoundTrack Award for students

=== Award Winners 2006 ===
- Paul van Vulpen (The Netherlands) – New Sound in European Film
- Matthias Heuser, Lief Thomas & Christiane Buchmann – European Talent Award: Best Sound Design

=== Award Winners 2007 ===
- Alexander Reumers (The Netherlands) – New Sound in European Film
- Ravian de Vries & Susanne Grünewald (The Netherlands) – European Talent Award: Best Sound Design

=== Award Winners 2008 ===
- Peter Thomas – SoundTrack Cologne Lifetime Achievement Award
- Joram Letwory (The Netherlands) – New Sound in European Film
- Henning Knoepfel (Great Britain) – European Talent Award: Best Sound Design
- Antoni Łazarkiewicz "Die zweite Frau" – German TV Music Award

=== Award Winners 2009 ===
- Irmin Schmidt – SoundTrack Cologne Lifetime Achievement Award
- Felix Rösch (Germany) – New Sound in European Film
- Phillip Specht (Germany) – European Talent Award: Best Sound Design
- Titas Petrikis (Lithuania) – Peer Raben Music Award
- Biber Gullatz & Andreas Schäfer (Komponist) "The Lost Father" – German TV Music Award

=== Award Winners 2010 ===
- Bruhn Christian Bruhn – SoundTrack Cologne Lifetime Achievement Award
- Martin Batchelar (Great Britain) – WDR Filmscore Award
- Jens Heuler & Dominik Campus (Germany) – European Talent Award: Best cooperation between composer and sound designer
- Jewgeni Birkhoff (Germany) – Peer Raben Music Award
- German TV Music Award

- Fabian Römer (Composer): "Tatort: Weil sie böse sind" - Best Music a TV Movie - Sven Rossenbach & Florian van Volxem: "Im Angesicht des Verbrechens" Best Music for a TV Series - Michael Kadelbach: Henners Traum – Das größte Tourismusprojekt Europas Best Music for a Documentary

=== Award Winners 2011 ===
- Horst Peter Koll – SoundTrack Cologne Lifetime Achievement Award
- Olivier Militon (France) – WDR Filmscore Award
- Nathan Blais (France) – European Talent Award: Best Sound Design
- Pablo Pico (France) – Peer Raben Music Award

=== Award Winners 2012 ===
- Michael Nyman – SoundTrack Cologne Lifetime Achievement Award
- John Chua (Singapore) – WDR Filmscore Award
- Sebastian Kübler (Germany) – European Talent Award: Best Sound Design
- Enrica Sciandrone (Italy/Great Britain) – Peer Raben Music Award

=== Award Winners 2013 ===
- Manfred Eicher – SoundTrack Cologne Lifetime Achievement Award
- Filip Šijanec (Slovenia) – WDR Filmscore Award
- Artur Khayrullin (Russia) – European Talent Award: Best Sound Design
- Rosanna Zünd (Switzerland) – Peer Raben Music Award
- Kidd Life (Denmark) – See The Sound Music Documentary Award
- Laurence Owen (Great Britain) – Früh Kölsch Audience Award for the Best Music in a Short Film

=== Award Winners 2014 ===
- Eberhard Schoener – SoundTrack Cologne Lifetime Achievement Award
- Marianna Liik (Estonia) – WDR Filmscore Award
- Friso Hoekstra (The Netherlands) – European Talent Award: Best Sound Design
- Denise Barth (Germany) – Peer Raben Music Award
- Europe in 8 Bits (Spain) – See The Sound Music Documentary Award

=== Award Winners 2015 ===
- Enjott Schneider – SoundTrack Cologne Lifetime Achievement Award
- Damian Scholl (Germany) – WDR Filmscore Award
- Armin Badde (Germany) – European Talent Award: Best Sound Design
- Stanislav Makovsky (Russia) – Peer Raben Music Award
- The Case of the Three Sided Dream (USA) – See The Sound Music Documentary Award

=== Award Winners 2016 ===
- Cliff Martinez – SoundTrack Cologne Lifetime Achievement Award
- Daniel Herget (Germany) – WDR Filmscore Award
- Jérémy Bocquet (France) – European Talent Award: Best Sound Design
- Filip Sijanec (Slovenia) – Peer Raben Music Award
- I Go Back Home - Jimmy Scott – See The Sound Music Documentary Award
- zdf@bauhaus - Award for the Best German Live Music TV-Show

=== Award Winners 2017 ===
- Bruce Broughton – SoundTrack Cologne Lifetime Achievement Award
- Thomas Chabalier (France) – WDR Filmscore Award
- Martin B. Janssen (France) – Peer Raben Music Award
- Liberation Day – See The Sound Music Documentary Award
- Berlin live - Award for the Best German Live Music TV-Show

=== Award Winners 2018 ===
- Craig Armstrong – SoundTrack Cologne Lifetime Achievement Award
- Ben Winkler (Germany) – WDR Filmscore Award
- Celia Ruiz Artacho (Spain) – European Talent Award: Best Sound Design
- Mateja Starič (Slovenia) – Peer Raben Music Award
- Silvana – See The Sound Music Documentary Award

=== Award Winners 2019 ===
- Klaus Doldinger – SoundTrack Cologne Lifetime Achievement Award
- Leon Maximilian Brückner (Germany) – WDR Filmscore Award
- Paul Clímaco Müller Reyes (Germany) – European Talent Award: Best Sound Design
- Mateo Ojeda (Colombia) – Peer Raben Music Award
- BNK48: Girls Don’t Cry – See The Sound Music Documentary Award

=== Award Winners 2020 ===
- Don Davis – SoundTrack Cologne Lifetime Achievement Award
- Fabian Zeidler (Germany) – WDR Filmscore Award
- Sinan Varis (Germany) – European Talent Award: Best Sound Design
- Alex Symcox (USA) – Peer Raben Music Award
- Everybody's Everything – See The Sound Music Documentary Award

=== Award Winners 2021 ===
- Rachel Portman – SoundTrack Cologne Lifetime Achievement Award
- Ludwig Peter Müller (Germany) – WDR Filmscore Award
- Maximilian Sattler (Germany) – European Talent Award: Best Sound Design
- Paulo Gallo – Peer Raben Music Award
- Shut up Sona – See The Sound Music Documentary Award

=== Award Winners 2022 ===
- Walter Murch – SoundTrack Cologne Lifetime Achievement Award
- Lorenzo Gioelli (Italy) – WDR Filmscore Award
- David Kamp (Germany) – Peer Raben Music Award
- Anonymous Club – See The Sound Music Documentary Award

=== Award Winners 2023 ===
- Mychael Danna – Lifetime Achievement Award
- Johann Grillenbeck (Germany) – WDR Filmscore Award
- Pavel Sitnikov (Russia) – European Talent Award: Best Sound Design
- Jan Willem de With (Germany/The Netherlands) – Peer Raben Music Award
- And Still I Sing – See The Sound Music Documentary Award

=== Award Winners 2024 ===
- Gustavo Santaolalla – Lifetime Achievement Award
- Florian Simon Krefting (Germany) – WDR Filmscore Award
- Jenny Winter (Germany) – European Talent Award: Best Sound Design
- Mári Mákó and Rozi Mákó (Hungary) – Peer Raben Music Award
- Elis & Tom. It Had to Be You – See The Sound Music Documentary Award

=== Award Winners 2025 ===
- Michael Abeles – Career Achievement Award
- Lucia Vité (Switzerland) – WDR Filmscore Award
- Melanie Gäb (Germany) – European Talent Award: Best Sound Design
- Clemens Gutjahr (Germany) – Peer Raben Music Award
- We are Fugazi from Washington D.C – See The Sound Music Documentary Award

== Speakers at SoundTrack Cologne (selection) ==
- Michael Abels (Pulitzer and Grammy winner; composer, Nope, Get Out)
- Petri Alanko (games composer Quantum Break, Alan Wake)
- Ali N. Askin (Lola-Award Winner; composer Leroy, Lost Children)
- Lesley Barber (composer Manchester by the Sea (film))
- Marcel Barsotti (composer)
- Gerd Baumann (Lola-Award winner; composer)
- Marco Beltrami (Oscar-nominated; composer I, Robot, Hellboy, Terminator 3: Rise of the Machines, Scream)
- Jean-Michel Bernard (composer The Science of Sleep)
- Volker Bertelmann (Oscar-nominated Lion (2016 film))
- Steve Blame (Screenwriter)
- Jongnic Bontemps (composer, Transformers: Rise of the Beasts)
- Amine Bouhafa (composer, The Man Who Sold His Skin)
- Boxed Ape (composer duo, The Casting of Frank Stone, Horizon Call of the Mountain)
- Bruce Broughton (composer Dallas, Silverado (film), Tombstone (film))
- Christian Bruhn (composer Captain Future)
- Anthony D'Amario (composer, Log Out)
- Dascha Dauenhauer (Winner of the German Film Award twice; composer, Islands)
- Sofia degli Alessandri-Hultquist (composer, Red, White & Royal Blue)
- Olivier Derivière (video games composer)
- Nainita Desai (composer, For Sama, American Murder - The Family Next Door, Call of Duty: Modern Warfare II)
- Maclaine Diemer (composer Rock band, Guild Wars)
- Björn Dixgård (singer and composer of Mando Diao)
- Klaus Doldinger (composer Das Boot, The NeverEnding Story (film), Tatort)
- Patrick Doyle (composer Harry Potter and the Goblet of Fire (film), Thor)
- Greg Edmonson (composer for film and TV King of the Hill (1997–2009), and the video game series Uncharted 1–3)
- Högni Egilsson (composer, Katla)
- Annette Focks (composer Krabat)
- John Frizzell (composer Alien Resurrection, Ghost Ship, The Reaping)
- Yoav Goren (Emmy Award Winner, music producer, film composer (i. a. Cloud Atlas (film), Spider-Man 2, The Da Vinci Code (film), Iron Man 3, The Lord of the Rings (film series)))
- Jason Graves (BAFTA-Award Winner and composer, i. a. for the video game series Dead Space (2008 video game), Heroes of Might and Magic, Silent Hunter or Tomb Raider)
- Jack Halama (composer, Who is Erin Carter?)
- Chris Hülsbeck (games composer, Turrican, The Great Giana Sisters)
- Jan A. P. Kaczmarek (Oscar-Winner & composer, Finding Neverland (film), Hachi: A Dog's Tale)
- Johnny Klimek (composer Run Lola Run, Cloud Atlas (film), Perfume: The Story of a Murderer (film))
- Harald Kloser (composer The Day After Tomorrow)
- Nathan Larson (composer, Boys Don´t Cry, High Fidelity, Margin Call)
- Antoni Łazarkiewicz (composer Winter Journey (2006 film))
- John Lunn (composer Downton Abbey, The Last Kingdom - 7 Kings must die)
- Nils Petter Molvær (trumpet player & composer Stratosphere Girl)
- John Ottman (composer & editor The Usual Suspects, X-Men (film series))
- Owen Pallett (Oscar-nominated, violinist, singer Her (film))
- Rachel Portman (composer, Oscar-Winner Emma (1996 theatrical film))
- Niki Reiser (Lola-Winner and composer Nowhere in Africa)
- Michael Riessler (composer Home from Home (2013 film))
- Edouard Rigaudière (composer, Log Out)
- Carsten Rocker (Tafiti)
- Jeff Rona (composer Traffic (2000 film), God of War (franchise))
- Marius Ruhland (composer Heaven)
- Stefan Ruzowitzky (Oscar-Winner; director The Counterfeiters)
- Dieter Schleip (composer)
- Volker Schlöndorff (director The Tin Drum)
- Irmin Schmidt (composer Can, Palermo Shooting)
- Garry Schyman (games composer BioShock)
- Mirjam Skal (composer, Vracht, Enjoy Your Stay, 111 - Echoes from Halifax)
- Venus Theory (video games composer, Avowed)
- Peter Thomas (composer Raumpatrouille)
- Kåre Vestrheim (HARPA Award winner 2025, composer, Power Play)
- Andreas Weidinger (composer)
- Matthias Weber (Lola-Winner, composer, Baywatch)
- Ralf Wengenmayr (composer Lissi und der wilde Kaiser, Der Schuh des Manitu)
- Bernd Wefelmeyer (conductor (1993 to 1995 Deutsches Filmorchester Babelsberg) and composer)
- Paul Wolinksi (video games composer)
- Bert Wrede (composer)
- Gabriel Yared (Oscar-Winner; composer The Lives of Others)
- Christopher Young (composer Spider Man 3, The Shipping News, Hellbound: Hellraiser III)
- Helmut Zerlett (composer, Lessons of a Dream)
- Inon Zur (games composer, Crysis, Fallout: New Vegas)
