= Akhavan =

Akhavan is a surname. Notable people with the surname include:

- Desiree Akhavan, American film director and actress
- Kazem Akhavan, Iranian diplomat kidnapped in Lebanon in 1982
- Mehdi Akhavan-Sales (1928–1990), Iranian poet
- Navíd Akhavan (born 1980), Iranian-German actor
- Payam Akhavan, Canadian lawyer
