= Michael Habeck =

German actor (1944–2011)

- Born: 23 April 1944; Bad Grönenbach, Germany
- Died: 4 February 2011 (aged 66); Munich, Germany
- Occupation: Actor
- Years active: 1965–2011

Michael Habeck (23 April 1944 – 4 February 2011) was a German actor, best known in Germany as the German voice of Oliver Hardy and Danny DeVito.

== Life ==
Habeck was born in Bad Grönenbach.

"After his training at the Ruth von Zerboni acting school in Munich, Michael Habeck had engagements at various German stages, including the Munich Kammerspiele, the Ruhrfestspiele Recklinghausen and at the Munich Volkstheater." As part of the Ruhr Festival in 1974, Habeck appeared as Lennox in Shakespeare's tragedy Macbeth, which was recorded by ARD and broadcast on television.

For years, Michael Habeck was present in television productions for children through the characters Oswin in the German preschool series Rappelkiste (1973–1984) and dubbing Ernie in Sesame Street, Barney Rubble in The Flintstones, Baby Fozzie in Muppet Babies (1984–1991) or as Mr. Rabbit in The Animals of Farthing Wood (1993–1996). In the animated series The Simpsons from 1991 to 1993. he dubbed the roles of Chief Wiggum in seasons two and three, Dr. Nick in season two and Groundskeeper Willie in season three. He was heard in the German dub of Asterix Conquers America.

He played in a considerable number of German series, including Tatort and Silas, and films. In 1984 Habeck received the Grimm Award for his role in the children's series Rappelkiste He also appeared in international productions, such as The Name of the Rose, where he played "the striking role of the corpulent bald monk Berengar", and Lexx, in which he played the role of Feppo.

Habeck was known for providing the German dubbing for Oliver Hardy after Bruno W. Pantel died, and Danny De Vito. He also dubbed several characters in the German version of The Muppet Show.

He died in Munich on 4 February 2011 after a short time of severe illness, aged 66.

== Filmography ==
Year	Title	Role	Notes
1972	Sie liebten sich einen Sommer	Boris	
1975	Carmina burana	The Monk	
1976	MitGift	Pförtner	
1983	Strange Fruits	Habek	
1985	Seitenstechen	Man in bus	
1986	The Name of the Rose	Berengar	
1988	The Bourne Identity	The Fat Man	2 episodes
1989	Lichtschlag	Erdmann	
1990	Die Richterin		
1992	Die schwache Stunde		
1992	Wir Enkelkinder	Ober	
1993	Texas - Doc Snyder hält die Welt in Atem	Buckliger (Elender)	
1995	Heaven or Bust	Nelson Lee	
1998	Lexx	Feppo	
2001	Himmlische Helden	Palkowic	
2008	Ossi's Eleven	Friedrich Preis	

=== German-language voice acting ===
Year	Title	Role	Notes
1979	Cola, Candy, Chocolate	Hotelchef Juanto	Uncredited
1990	Peter in Magicland	Milky Way Man	
1992	The Magic Voyage	Christopher Columbus	German version
1994	Asterix Conquers America	Lucullus	German version
1996	Pepolino and the Treasure of the Mermaid	The Glass Eye Pirate	
1999	Asterix and Obelix vs. Caesar	Caius Bonus	German version
2003	Till Eulenspiegel	Bäcker	
2004	Der Wixxer	Der Arsch mit den Ohren	Uncredited
2004	Home on the Range	Lucky Jack	German version
2005	Pettson & Findus - Tomtemaskinen	Weihnachtsmann / Briefträger	
