= Peter in Magicland =

1990 animated film by Wolfgang Urchs

Peter in Magicland: A Fantastic Journey
- Theatrical release poster
- Directed by: Wolfgang Urchs
- Written by: Alexander Kekulé; Wolfgang Urchs
- Based on: Little Peter's Journey to the Moon by Gerdt von Bassewitz
- Starring: André Schmidtsdorf; Nathalie del Castillo; Manfred Lichtenfeld; Friedrich W. Bauschulte
- Narrated by: Arne Elsholtz (German); William Roberts (English)
- Edited by: Gisela Haller
- Music by: Klaus Doldinger
- Production companies: Televersal; TC-Film; Trickfilmstudio; Iduna Film; ZDF
- Release date: 29 November 1990
- Running time: 80 minutes (cut version); 125 minutes (five-part version)
- Country: Germany
- Language: German

Peter in Magicland: A Fantastic Journey (German: Peterchens Mondfahrt) is a 1990 German animated children's fantasy film, based on Gerdt von Bassewitz's 1915 book Little Peter's Journey to the Moon. The film was released on 29 November 1990 in Germany.

== Plot ==
One night, siblings Peter and Annabelle are woken up by a noise in their bedroom that sounds like music. Upon investigating, they find the source: a beetle playing on his violin. The beetle introduces himself as Mr. Buzzworthy, the 5th descendant from the dynasty of Buzzworthy, who then tells them his tragic story: hundreds of years ago, on a Sunday morning, his great-great-great-grandfather was resting on a birch, when an evil woodcutter chopped the tree down and took it away, also taking the beetle's sixth leg (lower left arm) with him; as a consequence, all following generations were born only with five legs. Shortly after, the beetle is visited by a Night Fairy, who tells him that she punished the woodcutter by banishing him to the Moon along with the tree, thus becoming Moon Man. When the beetle realizes that his leg is missing, the Fairy advises him to search for two kind children who have never hurt anyone and are brave enough for a dangerous journey to the Moon.

Upon hearing the story, the children agree to help him retrieve his leg. After teaching the children how to fly and being granted flying licenses from three flight commission beetles, they set off towards the sky. After evading some of the mischievous Weather Makers, they reach Sandman, a wizard whose job is to make children fall asleep. Explaining the situation to him, he agrees to take them to the Night Fairy's castle in a coach pulled by butterflies. After evading the Makers again and getting their coach unstuck while on Milky Way, they finally reach the castle, where a party among the Makers is taking place. Reminding the Fairy of her promise, she gives them the Great Bear to help them get to the Moon, telling them that the Makers will help them in their journey only when they show true courage against any danger.

Reaching the Moon, they go through the Christmas Kingdom and Easter Nest to find some food for the Bear, before continuing on their journey. After fending off some hostile wolves, they arrive at a cannon which shoots Peter, Annabelle and Mr. Buzzworthy to the top of the mountain, where the tree with the beetle's leg stands. They encounter the Moon Man himself, and the Makers come to the children's aid, eventually defeating him by freezing him. Peter removes the leg from the tree and attaches it back to Mr. Buzzworthy, who is now overjoyed at having his long-lost leg back. When the sun rises, the ice from the Moon Man melts and he tries to attack them, but they escape him by flying into a chimney that wakes them up, revealing it all to be a dream. After their mother (who looks similar to the Night Fairy) checks on them, they find a beetle resting on their windowsill, who has all of his six legs. The beetle then flies away, while Peter and Annabelle wonder if they will ever fly with him again.

== Cast ==
Character	(Germany) Original German	(United Kingdom) English dub
Peter	André Schmidtsdorf	Kristopher Milnes (credited as Christopher Milnes)
Annabelle	Nathalie del Castillo	Becky Smith
Mr. Buzzworthy	Manfred Lichtenfeld	Peter Whitman
Sandman	Friedrich W. Bauschulte	Peter Hawkins
Night Fairy / Mother	Dagmar Heller	Liza Ross
Mother Cloud	Doris Jensen	Eve Karpf
Gingerbread Man	Willi Röbke	Stephen Tate
Storm Giant	Fritz von Hardenberg	William Roberts
Moon Man	Wolfgang Hess	Douglas Blackwell
Butterfly	Unknown	Julia Brahms (credited as Julia Brams)
Father Christmas	Walter Reichelt	John Bull
Sun Fairy	Nathalie del Castillo	Unknown
Rain Man	Udo Wachtveitl	Unknown
Milky Way Man	Michael Habeck	Unknown
Lightning Maker	Monika John	Unknown
Thunder Maker	Manfred Erdmann	Unknown
Wind Maker	Martina Dunker	Unknown
Water Man	Arne Elsholtz	Unknown
Max the Ice Maker	Pascal Breuer	Unknown

== Release ==
An 80-minute cut of the film was initially widely released as a full-length feature and a five-part miniseries. The uncut version first aired in December 1992 on ZDF.

== See also ==
- Little Peter's Journey to the Moon
- Moonbound
