= The Magic Voyage =

1992 animated film by Michael Schoemann

- Theatrical release poster
- Directed by: Michael Schoemann
- Written by: Klaus Birk; Jörg Grünler
- Story by: Ute Schoemann-Koll
- Produced by: Michael Schoemann
- Starring: Michael Habeck; Jens Wawrczeck
- Narrated by: Hans Paetsch
- Edited by: Karl Fugunt; Jean-Claude Piroué; Angelika Deumling; Günter Kujat; Cornelia Steinbrenner
- Music by: Harald Kloser; Thomas Schobel; Sam Spence
- Production companies: MS-Films; Bavaria Film; Zweites Deutsches Fernsehen (ZDF)
- Distributed by: Atlas Film (Germany); Hemdale Film Corporation (United States)
- Release date: 14 February 1992
- Running time: 82 minutes
- Country: Germany
- Languages: German; English
- Budget: $14.5 million
- Box office: $51,000

The Magic Voyage (German: Die Abenteuer von Pico & Columbus, lit. 'The Adventures of Pico and Columbus') is a 1992 German animated musical fantasy film produced and directed by Michael Schoemann. It was released in Germany by Atlas Film on 14 February 1992. The film was later dubbed in English and released in the United States and Canada: two English dubs were actually produced. The first one was a rare English dub released by Atlas Film, while the second English dub was produced by Hemdale Film Corporation, released as The Magic Voyage on 23 April 1993 with a new and better-known voice cast. The latter dub had a different music soundtrack, and both English dubs had different translations.

== Plot ==
In 1492, many believe that the Earth is flat and that ships could fall over the planet's edge; the dangers of the ocean have thus far prevented the extensive travel that would disprove this belief. However, Italian navigator Christopher Columbus theorizes that the Earth is a cube, which negatively affects his cartography.

An adventuring woodworm named Pico eats away the corners of Columbus' globe, which convinces him that the Earth is round. With the prospect of falling off the Earth eliminated, Columbus concludes that he could reach the Indies faster by sea travel than Marco Polo had done by land, and goes to present his theory to King Ferdinand and Queen Isabella of Spain in the hope of receiving funding for an expedition. Columbus' proposal outrages King Ferdinand, but the infatuated Queen Isabella is won over by his promise of spices, gold and jewellery, and she grants his request for three ships. King Ferdinand, not expecting Columbus to return, agrees to the voyage, but tells Columbus that he faces execution if he does not return with gold.

Meanwhile, Pico snoops around the castle and meets Marilyn, the princess of the moon sprites. Marilyn explains that her land was invaded by an evil insect swarm named the Swarm Lord, and she has been kept prisoner in the castle's chandelier until she reveals the secret of her powers to him. Pico and Marilyn attempt to escape, but the Swarm Lord returns and takes Marilyn to his kingdom in the still-undiscovered New World.

The next day, Columbus is about to set sail on the Santa Maria to discover the New World. Pico rushes to the ship, but is stopped by a trio of rats, who plan to eat him. Pico informs the rats of a food supply on Columbus' ship, but they leave Pico behind, and he narrowly reaches the ship by hitching a ride on a passing seagull. The rats, having learned that the ship is sailing to the supposed end of the world, attempt to steal Columbus' lifeboat and flee, but Pico dissuades them from the theft by convincing them that the New World is a land of cheese. Pico reunites with Columbus and explains that he needs to save Marilyn.

Columbus' crewmates overhear their captain talking to Pico and conclude that Columbus is crazy. That night, Pico learns of the crew's plot to kill Columbus to avoid sailing off the Earth's edge. He warns Columbus, who placates the crew with a song about heroic sailors. The next day, the crew's morale drops once more when a supposed island turns out to be a deserted Viking ship. As the crew try to hang Columbus, he sees the New World from the mast. The Swarm Lord appears and attempts to destroy the ship, but it manages to make it ashore.

Pico, Columbus, a beaver named Bob, and two surviving rats venture through the island's jungle and reach the Swarm Lord's Aztec temple. As the Swarm Lord attempts to steal Marilyn's powers, Pico rescues her while Columbus climbs to the top of the Swarm Lord's honeycomb and takes a golden idol. Columbus uses the idol to squash the Swarm Lord, and Bob destroys the temple by chewing through the honeycomb. The team escapes, but Marilyn drowns in a waterfall and is found lifeless on a floating flower. Once the sun rises, she comes back to life and Pico and Marilyn kiss. The natives of the island thank Columbus for destroying the Swarm Lord. The group sails off back to Spain, and Columbus is happy knowing that he discovered the New World and proved that the world is round.

== Cast ==
Character	Original German	English dub (Atlas Film version)	English dub (Hemdale version)
Christopher Columbus	Michael Habeck	Donald Arthur	Dom DeLuise
Pico the Woodworm	Jens Wawrczeck	—N/a	Corey Feldman
Marilyn	Katja Nottke	Elisabeth Von Molo	Irene Cara
Queen Isabella	Beate Hasenau	Helena Jungwirth	Samantha Eggar
King Ferdinand IV	Christian Schult	—N/a	Dan Haggerty
The Swarm Lord	Eric Vaessen	—N/a	Dan Haggerty
Diego	Eric Vaessen	—N/a	—N/a
Bob the Beaver	Lutz Mackensy	—N/a	—N/a
Narrator	Hans Paetsch	Jack Luceno	Mickey Rooney
Ritso the Rat	—N/a	Jack Luceno	—N/a
Julias the Rat	—N/a	Donald Arthur	—N/a
Gutter the Rat	—N/a	Phil Nibbelink	—N/a
Mortimer the Seagull	Chris Howland	Phil Nibbelink	—N/a
Geraldo	—N/a	J. Drew Lucas	—N/a
Sailor #2	—N/a	—N/a	—N/a
Sailor #3	Christian Schult	—N/a	—N/a
Native Chief	Eric Vaessen	Osman Ragheb	—N/a
Herald	Thomas Karallus	—N/a	—N/a

Daran Norris, Henry Crowell Jr., James Knapp, Brett Baxter Clark, Ted Prior and Rosemary Alexander provide additional voices in the Hemdale dub.

Marshall Raynor, Marcus Calvin, David Creedon, Nick Lloyd, Helena Jungwirth, Dilys Goggins, Elmore James, J. Drew Lucas, David Kehoe, Phil Nibbelink, Deborah Norris, Jack Luceno, Marian Schikorn, Ron Williams, Osman Ragheb, Ziad Ragheb, Elisabeth Von Molo, and David Williamson provide additional voices in the Atlas dub, though many of their roles are unidentified since they were not given specific credits.

== Musical numbers ==
The songs are written by Scott Santoro, except "Heaven Is" written by Harald Kloser, Tommy Schobel, Al Jarreau and Robby Scharf.

- "Christopher Columbus" (instrumental)
- "Pico the Adventurer" – Feldman
- "A Fella Like You" – Feldman and DeLuise
- "The World of Magic" – Cara
- "The Life of the Sea" – DeLuise
- "We'll Always Be Together" – Feldman and Cara
- "Heaven Is" – Jarreau

== Production ==
The Magic Voyage was originally released in Germany in 1992, the year when America celebrated the 500th anniversary of the famous voyage of Christopher Columbus. Other films released during this time of year include 1492: Conquest of Paradise, Carry On Columbus and Christopher Columbus: The Discovery.

At the time, it was the most expensive animated production in Germany, costing 14.5 million Deutsche Marks (8.3 million in dollars). During the initial German theatrical release, Schoemann said that it was intended to be a film about the discovery of America "from a more satirical view in order to differentiate ourselves clearly from the lofty views of history so we can present Columbus as a lovable, charming and befuddled scholar".

During initial production, the film would star the woodworm from Stowaways on the Ark (another German animated film produced by MS-Film), as well as a modest Columbus, but the film was altered once American partners started investing in it and saw potential for an international market. Phil Nibbelink served as animation director, while American animators Stanley Green, Kevin Richardson, Rick Morrison and George Singer manned the animation department. Production took three years.

=== English dub ===
Two English dubs were produced; the first features the voices of Donald Arthur as Columbus, as well as Nibbelink and several German voice actors in miscellaneous roles. The availability is rare, but it can be obtained through Malaysian VCD releases distributed by Berjaya HVN Sdn Bhd and Croatian VHS issuings with subtitles.

The second dub was recorded for the North American home video release with a more well-known cast, including Dom DeLuise as Columbus, Corey Feldman as Pico, Irene Cara as Marilyn and Mickey Rooney as the Narrator. Particularly notable in this dub is an abundance of ad-libbing. The U.S. dub was written by David T. Reilly and Visual Effects supervisor Scott Santoro.

== Release ==
When the film was theatrically released in 1992, only 10,000 people attended cinemas to watch the film. Ticket prices of the time were USD$5.10; by that time, this would come out to roughly $51,000.

=== Home media ===
The original German version was released by Warner Bros. in home media in France and Germany. Specifically, Warner Home Video released the film in Germany on VHS and LaserDisc, and Warner Vision on DVD in France, in cooperation with the Jean-Paul Bretagnolle Group (which would previously release it on VHS), in November 1999.

In North America, the second English dubbed version was issued by Hemdale Home Video on 3 December 1993. Image Entertainment and Faber International Films carried over the Hemdale English dub onto the DVD release, which came out on 28 September 1999. In the Netherlands, this version was dubbed in Dutch and released on VCD and VHS in 1995 by CNR Film & Video, and on DVD by First Look. Its title is Pico en het geheim van de gouden tempel (English: Pico and the Secret of the Golden Temple).

An Italian dub starring Tullio Solenghi as Columbus and Mino Caprio as Pico was released Alfadedis Entertainment on VHS.

== Merchandise ==
A book titled Pico & Columbus, written by Anna Benthin, was released in 1991 by Loewe Bindlach, prior the film's release in Germany. It was re-released in 1993 by Habel.
