= Salami Aleikum =

- Directed by: Ali Samadi Ahadi
- Written by: Ali Samadi Ahadi and Arne Nolting
- Produced by: Oliver Stoltz
- Starring: Navíd Akhavan, Anna Böger, Michael Niavarani, Wolfgang Stumph, Proschat Madani, Eva-Maria Radoy
- Cinematography: Bernhard Jasper
- Music by: Ali N. Askin
- Release date: July 23, 2009 (Germany)
- Running time: 99 min
- Country: Germany
- Languages: German, Persian

Salami Aleikum is a 2009 comedy film by Ali Samadi Ahadi about an Iranian migrant family in Germany who try to cope with life in exile. There are animation parts and some musical videoclips (Iranian music and dance) are included. Salami Aleikum was a successful film in Germany.

== Summary ==
Mohsen Taheri (Navíd Akhavan), son of a migrated Iranian butcher family, hates and is afraid of killing animals. When his father (Michael Niavarani) is sick, he has to go to the post-reunification East Germany to buy sheep. In a village there, Mohsen falls in love with former shot-putter Ana (Anna Böger) who is vegetarian. Mohsen tells them that he is from a Persian textile dynasty, and the villagers hope he saves the village's textile industry. Mohsen becomes more and more en vogue until his family come to find him.

== Prizes ==
Salami Aleikum won the International Filmfest Emden 2009, the second prize of the Bernhard Wicki Film Prize and the NDR Film Prize for the offspring. The film was nominated for the MFG-Star Baden-Baden 2009.

The film won the prize of the German Film Critics Award 2009, for Best Debut Film at the Berlinale. In 2010 the film's composer Ali N. Askin was nominated for the Deutscher Filmpreis. On 9 May 2012 Salami Aleikum received the Civis media prize.
