= Eberhard Schoener =

German musician, composer, conductor, and arranger

- Also known as: Eberhard Schöner
- Born: May 13, 1936 (age 90); Stuttgart, Germany
- Occupations: musician, composer, conductor
- Instrument: keyboards
- Years active: 1960s–present
- Website: eberhard-schoener.com

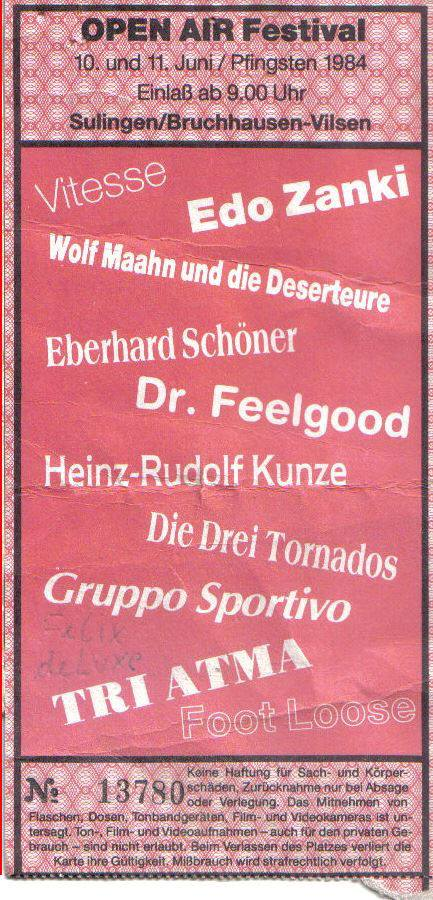
Lineup for the 1984 Bruchhausen-Festival in Lower Saxony, featuring Schoener alongside acts like Vitesse, Dr. Feelgood and Heinz Rudolf Kunze.

Eberhard Schoener (born 13 May 1936; [ˈeːbɐhaʁt ˈʃøːnɐ], also spelled Schöner) is a German musician, composer, conductor, and arranger. His activities combine many styles and formats. Originally a classical violinist and conductor of chamber music and opera, he was one of the early adopters and popularizers of the Moog synthesizer in Europe. In the 1970s he traveled to Indonesia and incorporated musical elements from Asia into his own work. He has collaborated with rock musicians such as Jon Lord and The Police and also with German electronic music pioneers Tangerine Dream on an orchestral arrangement for the "Mojave Plan" track for a live performance on a German TV show. He has composed film scores, videos, music for television, and an opera to be broadcast via the Internet. He has won numerous awards, including the 1975 Schwabing Art Prize for music, the 1992 Bambi Award for creativity and a lifetime achievement award at the Soundtrack Cologne Festival of Music and Sound in Film and the Media in November 2014.

== Career highlights ==
Sources:

- 1958 Studies Violin at the Academy of Music in Detmold (Nordwestdeutsche Musikakademie) under Professor Tibor Varga, chorister under Professor Eugen Pabst
- 1959 Scholarship at the Accademia Musicale Chigiana in Siena, conducting class under Sergiu Celibidache and chamber music under Quintetto Chiagiano
- 1960 First violin at the Bavarian State Opera House
- 1961 Foundation of the Munich Juvenile Symphony Orchester, known across the borders as "The Young Orchestra (Das junge Orchester)" in the ARD TV-series.
- 1964 Musical supervisor of the Bavarian Opera until 1968
- 1965 Foundation of the Munich Chamber Opera and since the artistic supervisor and conductor. Amongst others he conducted annual opera and concert performances at the Brunnenhof (Fountain-Courtyard) at the Residence Castle in Munich
- 1972 "Gianni Schicchi" by Giacomo Puccini as a public performance at the Olympic Games in Munich.
- 1973 The chamber opera "La Zingara" for German public television (ZDF)
- 1974 Collaborates with Jon Lord of Deep Purple on Windows and performance is televised also featuring David Coverdale, Glenn Hughes, and Pete York
- 1974 The opera "The Chief of the Theatre (Der Schauspieldirektor)" by W.A. Mozart music supervision and directed for television, starring Peter Ustinov as well as "The Bandmaster (Der Kapellmeister)" by Cimarosa. Both were published as a record through EMI-Classic.
- 1975 Conducts Philharmonia Hungarica for Sarabande album by Jon Lord of Deep Purple
- 1977 The fragment of an opera "Shakuntala" by Franz Schubert for the International Dance Theatre for German public television (ZDF).
- 1978 Records "Video Magic" and "Flashback" with Andy Summers, Sting and Stewart Copeland.
- 1981 Orchestral Arrangements and Conducting of "Mojave Plan" by Tangerine Dream played with the band for German Public Television at Circus Krone Building in Munich.
- 1987 "Pop-Stars perform Brecht/Weill": A concert at the Theatre of Hamburg recorded for television (NDR) featuring Sting, Gianna Nannini and Jack Bruce.
- 1989 Third music-festival on the Island Elba with the performance of the opera "Mozart & Salieri".

== Awards ==
Date	Award
1975	Schwabing Art Award for Music
1977	Nominated for the German Album Award
1977	Ministry of the Interior Award for the Script "Rita or the Goldopera"
1992	BAMBI for Creativity
1993	TELESTAR of German Television

== Discography ==
Album	Release date	Notes
The Box	1969	
Destruction of Harmony	1971	Electronic Music based on Bach
A Day's Lullaby	1971	
Meditation	1973	
Windows	1974	Collaboration with Jon Lord of Deep Purple, performed on live TV and released as album
Sarabande	1976	Conducts Hungarian Philharmonic for solo album by Jon Lord of Deep Purple
Bali Agúng	1975	
Music from Bali	1976	
Bastien and Bastienne	1976	
The Playwright Director	1976	
Trance-Formation	1977	
The Book	1977	
Flashback	1978	
Video Magic	1978	
Video Flashback	1979	Compilation: 5 tracks from 'Video Magic', and 2 each from 'Trance-Formation' and 'Flashback'
Events	1980	
Video Magic	1981	Compilation with same name as 1978 album: 4 tracks from that, plus 1 track from 'Trance-Formation', and 4 from 'Flashback'
Time Square	1981	
Eberhard Schoener with Sting, Andy Summers & Stewart Copeland of The Police	1981	Another compilation: 5 tracks from 'Flashback' and 2 from 'Video Magic'
Complicated Ladies	1982	
Spurensicherung	1983	
Sky Music / Mountain Music	1984	
1985 Track Securing	1985	
Eberhard Schoener System	1985	
Eberhard Schoener / Sting / Andy Summers	1986	Yet another compilation – As 1978 'Video Magic' except 1 track is replaced with 1 from 'Flashback'
Bon Voyage	1986	
Video Flashback	1988	
The Heritage of the Guldenbergs	1989	
Eberhard Schoener, Sting, Andy Summers	1986	
Bali Symphony – Trance Mission	1991	
Why Don't You Answer	1992	
Harmonia Mundi	1993	
Time Cycle	1994	
Palazzo dell'Amore / Cold Genius	1996	
Film Music "Derrick"	1998	
Hey Mr. Gentleman	1998	
Potsdamer Platz – Heart of Berlin	1988	
Namaste-Puja	1999	
Eberhard Schoener And Friends – crossing times and continents	2006	Compilation/Re-working (1977–2006)
