= Fremde Haut =

- German poster
- Directed by: Angelina Maccarone
- Written by: Angelina Maccarone; Judith Kaufmann
- Starring: Jasmin Tabatabai; Anneke Kim Sarnau; Navíd Akhavan
- Cinematography: Judith Kaufmann
- Release dates: 4 July 2005 (Karlovy Vary International Film Festival); 20 October 2005 (Germany)
- Running time: 97 minutes
- Countries: Germany, Austria
- Languages: German, Persian

Fremde Haut is a 2005 German film. It was directed by Angelina Maccarone and stars Jasmin Tabatabai, Anneke Kim Sarnau, and Navíd Akhavan. Its English title is Unveiled.

== Background ==
Writers Maccarone and Judith Kaufmann conceived the idea for the film in 1998. In 2002, Maccarone sent a copy of the script to actress Tabatabai, who reviewed it. As an Iranian, Tabatabai worked with Maccarone and Kaufmann to rewrite the story to be more realistic. For example, the main character became "more subtle, not as outspoken."

Maccarone describes her aspirations and ideas for the film in an interview with AfterEllen.com. One of the issues she wished to contradict was the idea of humanity being split into 'good' and 'evil.' She states, "I believe the world, the human, is more complex than that. The simple solutions that are suggested by polarities are dangerous. Thinking like "we are good, they are evil" has existed for a long time and justified a lot of horrible things people do to each other."

Maccarone has also described her desire to use the film to act as a commentary on the discrimination that queer people face. Picturing how homosexuals often have to defend their identities in ways that heterosexuals do not, the film acts as an insight in how majorities define what is "normal."

== Plot ==
The translator Fariba Tabrizi (29, played by Jasmin Tabatabai) is at risk of the death penalty in her own country, Iran, after the vice squad discovers she is homosexual. With support from a relative, Fariba flees to Germany. When she is in the refugee detention centre at Frankfurt Airport her application for asylum is rejected. She lives hour by hour with the fear of being deported. Her poor prospects are improved by the suicide of a fellow-inmate from Iran as she assumes his identity and, as Siamak Mustafai, and using his temporary permit of sojourn, is re-located to Swabia.

Fariba knows Germany only from literature and as a translator which leave her unprepared for the small town of Sielmingen compared to a large city like Teheran. Also, her security is threatened as, in the refugee home, she is obliged to uphold her male disguise in cramped quarters while she is not permitted to leave the Regional District of Esslingen. The only way to escape is by means of forged documents for which she needs money. With help from her roommate, she comes into contact with Lächle, the local godfather. He obtains an illegal, seasonal job for her in a sauerkraut processing factory alongside the closeknit local workers.

One, Anne is manoeuvred by her workmates into taking a bet. She will get a bike for her son if she can get a date with the refugee chap. Another, Uwe, finds it totally out of order that Anne is so solicitous about Siamak. His worries are not unfounded, since Anne derives pleasure from the strange foreigner. Under other circumstances Fariba would have been only too glad to respond to Anne's advances, but is afraid on account of the Siamak facade. With stubbornness, Anne drags Siamak to the boozy get-togethers of locals. In the process, they become close and Anne begins to get wind of Fariba's true identity.

When Siamak's permit of sojourn runs out, Fariba gets into arrears with the instalments for her documents. It becomes clear to her that she will never manage things on her own. She risks everything and takes Anne into her confidence. She wants at long last to be able to live as a woman again, to live out her profession, to enjoy big cities. To break away from the provinces would also be the fulfilment of a dream for Anne. She does not disappoint Fariba. Together they successfully go in for car theft. Fariba gets her new passport. The world is their oyster.

Fariba is out of her Siamak disguise, Uwe and the clique turn up in Anne's flat. Uwe demands an explanation. The row escalates. The noisy dispute leads to Fariba's downfall. During the routine check on account of disturbance, the falsified passport falls into the hands of the police. The system which she believed she had outwitted takes its relentless grip. Anne has to watch on helplessly as Fariba is put under arrest. On the plane to Iran however Fariba puts on her disguise as Siamak again and resolves that she will return to Anne.

The term "in orbit" is officially used by the UN to refer to asylum-seekers who find themselves orbiting around planet Earth because they can not find legal domicile anywhere.

== Title ==
The original German title translates as "stranger's skin." Maccarone said,

On the one hand it means to wear another person’s personality, and on the other it has an erotic notion to it.

The English title, Unveiled, was conceived by the U.S. distributor of the film.

== Cast ==
- Jasmin Tabatabai as Fariba Tabrizi
- Anneke Kim Sarnau as Anne
- Navíd Akhavan as Siamak Mustafai
- Georg Friedrich as Burkhardt

== Awards ==
In 2006, Jasmin Tabatabai was nominated for the German Film Award as Best Actress.

- Hessian Film Award 2005
- Seattle Film Festival 2005: "Best Narrative Feature"
- Image Nation Film Festival Montreal 2005: "Great Jury Prize"
- Cyprus International Film Festival 2006: Best Actress in a Feature Film (Jasmin Tabatabai), Best Director (Angelina Maccarone), Best Film (Golden Aphrodite Award)

== See also ==
- LGBT rights in Iran
- Iranian Railroad for Queer Refugees
- List of LGBT films directed by women
