= The Green Wave =

- Film poster
- Directed by: Ali Samadi Ahadi
- Written by: Ali Samadi Ahadi, Oliver Stoltz
- Edited by: Barbara Toennieshen
- Release date: October 5, 2010 (Hamburg)
- Running time: 80 minutes
- Countries: Iran, Germany
- Languages: German, English, Persian

The Green Wave is a 2010 documentary film directed by Ali Samadi Ahadi. It covers the 2009 Iranian presidential election protests and human rights violations in Iran. The film premiered at the 2010 Filmfest Hamburg.

== Synopsis ==
The film portrays the actions of the Iranian government, under President Mahmoud Ahmadinejad, as it deals with backlash from citizens following the allegedly fraudulent results of the 2009 Iranian presidential elections. The film includes Facebook posts, Tweets and video in order to tell the story.
