= Gerdt von Bassewitz =

German lieutenant and playwright (1878–1923)

Gerdt Bernhard von Bassewitz-Hohenluckow (4 January 1878 in Allewind, Kingdom of Württemberg – 6 February 1923 in Berlin) was a German lieutenant in the Prussian militia, a writer, a playwright, and an actor. He had his only great success with Little Peter's Journey to the Moon (Peterchens Mondfahrt), which began as a successful stage play in 1912 in Leipzig and was published as a book in 1915.

It became one of the best-loved German children's books and has been a bestseller in Germany to this day. After his success, von Bassewitz became assistant stage director in Cologne. Eventually, he moved to Berlin, where he made a living as a freelance writer.

On 6 February 1923, after a public reading at the Villa Siemens, he committed suicide at the age of 45.

== Life and career ==
He belonged to the Hohenluckow branch of the Mecklenburg line of the ancient noble family of Bassewitz. His father, Eberhard von Bassewitz, an active dragoon officer, had leased the Allewind estate. His mother was born a Thedens from Husum; his parents met during a visit of Johann Christoph Blumhardt in Bad Boll.

Shortly after their marriage, his father took over the family estate of Liebenow in the Neumark, which he sold two years later. To support the family, he accepted a position as forestry cashier in neighbouring Hohenwalde. The couple had four daughters, in addition to Gerdt.

From the age of nine, Bassewitz attended the boarding school (Alumnat) of the Moravian Church in Niesky near Görlitz. Two years later he moved to Putbus on Rügen, where he received a place at the Princely Pädagogium until 1898. He then joined the Prussian Army in Cottbus as an Avantageur (officer candidate). After attending the war school in Metz, he was commissioned as a lieutenant on 17 October 1899. A heart condition led to his transfer in 1901 to prison guard duty at Sonnenburg in the Neumark, then in 1902 to District Command II in Berlin. He was granted leave until 1903 and subsequently retired on health grounds.

Bassewitz later became an actor. From 1908 to 1911 he worked at the Cologne City Theatre under Max Martersteig as assistant director. He subsequently lived in Berlin as a freelance writer.

His best-known work is the children's play Peterchens Mondfahrt, which premiered with great success at the Leipzig City Theatre on 7 December 1912. On a February day in 1923 he gave a reading of this work at the Siemens Villa in Wannsee, left abruptly, and took his own life. Although he wrote several dramas, he remained largely unknown during his lifetime.

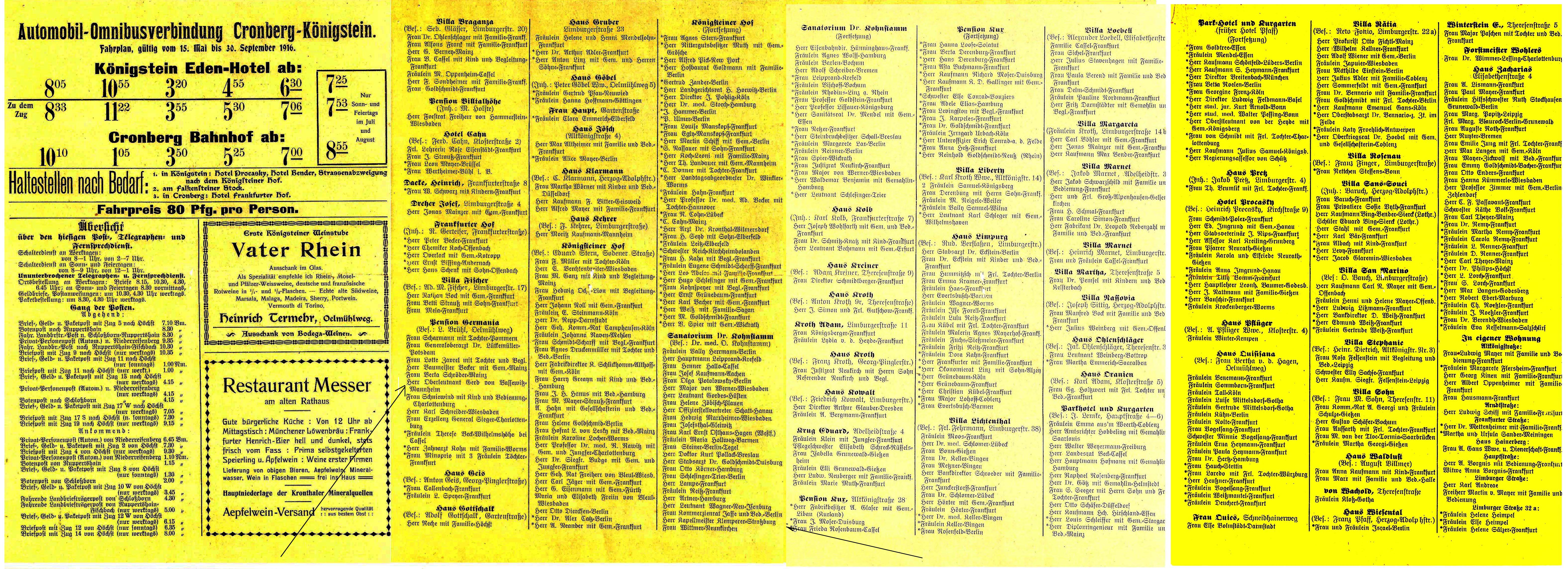
Guest list from 1916 – with G. von Bassewitz and Otto Klemperer (see arrow markings)

Oral tradition claims that Peterchens Mondfahrt was written in 1911 while Bassewitz was undergoing treatment at the sanatorium of Dr Oskar Kohnstamm in Königstein im Taunus, and that he used the doctor's children as models for the protagonists. The story was filmed twice (see Peterchens Mondfahrt (1959 film) and Peter in Magicland (1990 film)). In April 2012 the picture story Pips der Pilz – Ein Wald- und Weihnachtsmärchen with illustrations by Hans Baluschek was republished.

In a biography of the conductor Otto Klemperer, who met the writer in 1911 at Dr Kohnstamm's sanatorium, Eva Weissweiler writes:

He [...] meets a strange Mecklenburg nobleman, Gerdt von Bassewitz-Hohenluckow, once a lieutenant in the Prussian Landwehr who, to the horror of his clan, has turned to literature. In Königstein he writes a fairy tale for two of the four Kohnstamm children, Peter and Anneliese, aged three and eleven, which he titles Peterchens Mondfahrt.

Bassewitz was buried at the Nikolassee Evangelical Cemetery in Berlin; his grave was levelled in 1957.

== Contemporary accounts ==
Peter Kohnstamm later recalled the writer: "… he was in uniform, a tall, handsome man who reminded me of the singer (Herr Brinkmann) who sang Count Almaviva at the Frankfurt Opera during my schooldays. That is all I know...".

Franz Kafka described Bassewitz on 29 June 1912 in Leipzig: "… author of Judas, tall, nervous, dry face, movement in the hips, well-trained strong body. [...] All three [Bassewitz, Walter Hasenclever and Ernst Rowohlt] wave canes and arms."

== Works ==
List compiled by the author himself:

- Worte zu dir. Nature-philosophical essays. Eugen Diederichs, Jena 1907.
- Schahrazade. Play in three acts. Ernst Rowohlt, Leipzig 1911.
- Schahrazade. Opera in three acts, libretto by Gerdt von Bassewitz, music by Bernhard Sekles. Drei Masken Verlag, Berlin/Munich 1917.
- Judas. Tragedy in four acts. Ernst Rowohlt, Leipzig 1911.
- Peterchens Mondfahrt. Fairy-tale play in four scenes. Ernst Rowohlt, Leipzig 1912.
- Peterchens Mondfahrt. Fairy-tale picture book. Verlagsanstalt für Literatur und Kunst Hermann Klemm, Berlin-Grunewald 1916.
- Pips der Pilz. Fairy-tale play in five scenes for big and little people. Kurt Wolff Verlag, Leipzig 1916.
- Die Sunamitin. Drama in one prologue and three acts. Ernst Rowohlt, Leipzig 1912.

== See also ==
- Bassewitz
