= International Film Festival Play-Doc =

International documentary film festival of Tui

- Location: Tui, Galicia
- Founded: 2005
- Most recent: 2025
- Directors: Sara García Villanueva, Ángel Sánchez
- Festival date: May 7 to 11, 2025
- Website: https://www.play-doc.com/en/

Current: 21st
- 22nd 20th

The International Film Festival Play-Doc (Galician: Festival Internacional de Documentais Play-Doc) is a festival held annually in Tui, Galicia, dedicated to nonfiction cinema with a focus on local filmmaking.

== Profile ==
Play-Doc was established in 2005 by Sara García Villanueva and Ángel Sánchez. The festival is managed by the cultural association Enfoques and supported by Acción Cultural Española, it takes place annually in late April/early May in the Galician town of Tui. Apart from the main Galicia Competition, dedicated to contemporary cinema, the festival offers many retrospective selections and has an intimate, genial atmosphere where the audience and filmmakers can interact freely. The Resonancias section is managed by an independent group of ctitics and experts. Every edition of Play-Doc features special seminars, notably a Film Criticism Seminar, led by Ricardo Vieira Lisboa, as well as music events.

In 2005, Play-Doc collaborated with the Documania channel and established a special section Doc`amateur.

In 2014, Play-Doc was selected one of the 10 most important events in the world of documentary film by New York Best Fest Film Series association.

In 2024, Play-Doc inaugurated the Shadows section, dedicated to recovering the works of classic Galician filmmakers little known internationally.
