= Oskar Kohnstamm =

German neurologist and psychiatrist

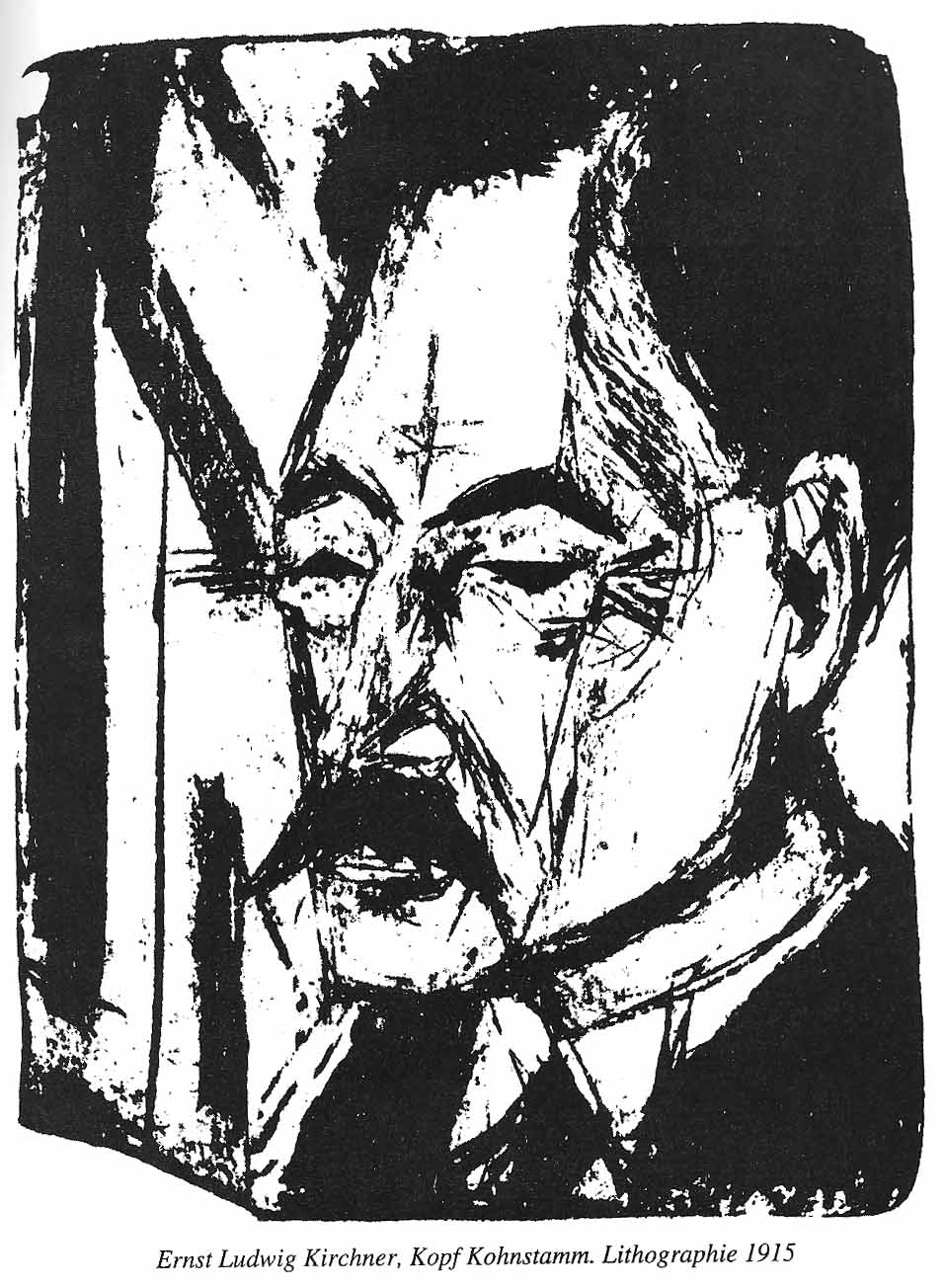
Oskar Kohnstamm 1915, Graphics by Ernst Ludwig Kirchner

Dr. Oskar Felix Kohnstamm (13 April 1871, in Pfungstadt – 6 November 1917, in Frankfurt am Main) was a German neurologist and psychiatrist. Initially trained in internal medicine in Giessen and Strassbourg he received his doctors degree in Berlin in 1894. Kohnstamm then began as a general practitioner in Königstein im Taunus, a small town in Hesse. There, he became more and more interested in neurology and psychiatry.

The phenomenon of muscle tension he observed is named after him with the name Kohnstamm's phenomenon. At the beginning of the 20th century, Oskar Kohnstamm founded a sanatorium in Königstein im Taunus which was intended to appeal to a group of intellectually high-quality patients, and which became internationally known.

== Life and work ==
His father was Moritz (Moses) Kohnstamm of Sephardic descent, and his mother was Pauline Wilhelmine Kohnstamm, née St. Goar.

His wife, Eva, daughter of Johannes Gad - one of Kohnstamm's Berlin professors, agreed to have occasionally depressive patients as guests in the house, who then got chores assigned in housekeeping, gardening or minding the children. Gradually, the idea ripened to build a small sanatorium for treating clinical depressions. The house, build in Jugendstil style, opened in 1905 and was expanded in 1912. Kohnstamm was no follower of Sigmund Freud but worked often with hypnosis.

Among his patients were three young men who would become world-famous: the painter Ernst Ludwig Kirchner, the actor Alexander Moissi, and the conductor Otto Klemperer.

Even the playwright Carl Sternheim was in medical treatment in Kohnstamms sanatorium during the First World War. The poets Stefan George, Karl Wolfskehl, the archaeologist Botho Graef and the architect Henry van de Velde have been friends of him. Gertrude Kingston was a cousin of him, Phyllis Konstam a niece. The tale Peter and Anneli's Journey to the Moon, which was written by a former patient Gerdt von Bassewitz, was playing in his sanatorium with his children as the main character.

== See also ==
- Kohnstamm's phenomenon
