= Raphael von Bargen =

German actor

Raphael von Bargen (born 22 March 1977) is a German TV, film and stage actor.

== Training ==
Born in Hamburg), where he studied to abitur level, he was next educated in music and philosophy. He completed his acting studies at the Max Reinhardt Seminar in Vienna in 2002. During his course he took several roles, including Alma (directed by Paulus Manker) as well as being directed three times by Stephanie Mohr - in Angriffe auf Anne (in the Spielbar of the Vienna Volkstheater), as Gottschalk in Käthchen von Heilbronn (at the Stadttheater Klagenfurt) and as Puck in A Midsummer Night's Dream.

== Awards and nominations ==
- Nestroy-Theaterpreis 2002 – Nominierung in der Kategorie Bester Nachwuchs für seine Darstellung des Hippolytos in Phaidras Liebe am Wiener Volkstheater
- 2008/09: Karl-Skraup-Preis für die Titelrolle in Peer Gynt am Wiener Volkstheater
- Nestroy-Theaterpreis 2011 – Nominierung in der Kategorie Beste Nebenrolle für seine Darstellung des Wächsters in Antigone am Wiener Volkstheater
- Nestroy-Theaterpreis 2012 – Nominierung in der Kategorie Bester Schauspieler für die Titelrolle in Woyzeck & The Tiger Lillies (Vereinigte Bühnen Wien in Kooperation mit dem MuseumsQuartier)
- Österreichischer Filmpreis 2017 – Nominierung als Bester männlicher Darsteller für Thank You for Bombing

== Selected filmography ==
- 2002: Kommissar Rex – Wenn Kinder sterben wollen
- 2004: Strafversetzt
- 2005: SOKO Kitzbühel – Schlittenfahrt in den Tod
- 2005: Mutig in die neuen Zeiten – Im Reich der Reblaus
- 2006: Mutig in die neuen Zeiten – Nur keine Wellen
- 2006: Mozart Werke Ges.m.b.H.
- 2008: Bible Code
- 2008: Der Winzerkönig – Erntezeit
- 2008: Darum (Director: Harald Sicheritz)
- 2009: SOKO Kitzbühel – Abgeschrieben
- 2009: Schnell ermittelt – Iris Litani
- 2011: SOKO Donau – Der Trojaner
- 2012: Grenzgänger (Director: Florian Flicker)
- 2012: SOKO Kitzbühel – Entsorgt
- 2013: Paul Kemp – Alles kein Problem – Die Hölle sind wir
- 2013: Tatort – Zwischen den Fronten
- 2013: Bad Fucking
- 2014: Clara Immerwahr
- 2015: Woman in Gold
- 2015: Thank You for Bombing
- 2018: SOKO Donau – Fadenspiel
- 2018: Universum History – Der Verrat des Kaisers
- 2018: Glauben, Leben, Sterben
- 2019: Die Toten von Salzburg – Mordwasser
- 2019: Vienna Blood
- seit 2019: Die Toten vom Bodensee (TV series)
  - 2019: Die Meerjungfrau
  - 2020: Fluch aus der Tiefe
  - 2020: Der Blutritt
- 2025: The Seasons, voice only
