= Kohnstamm's phenomenon =

Involuntary contraction of a muscle

First described by German neurologist Oskar Kohnstamm (1871–1917) in 1915, Kohnstamm's phenomenon is a sustained involuntary contraction of a muscle after a prolonged voluntary contraction. The simplest demonstration, sometimes called "the floating arms experiment", is to have a subject press the arms against a door frame or wall for about thirty seconds, and then step away. The arms will involuntarily rise.

Russian scientists Victor Gurfinkel, Mikhail Lebedev and Yuri Levick used Kohnstamm's phenomenon to activate tonogenic structures in humans and thereby demonstrate postural automatisms, such as neck reflexes.

== See also ==
- Motor control
