= Rappelkiste =

- Country of origin: Germany

Original release
- Network: ZDF
- Release: 30 September 1973 – 25 March 1984

Rappelkiste is a West German children's television series which aired from 1973 to 1984. Regarding its general conception and idea, it is very roughly comparable to Sesame Street in the English-speaking world. It was produced by ZDF and originally broadcast every Sunday on 2 pm. For its 1973–74 season, it was awarded the Adolf-Grimme-Preis.

== See also ==
- List of German television series
