= 45 Minutes to Ramallah =

45 Minutes to Ramallah is a German comedy film by the German-Iranian film director Ali Samadi Ahadi. The film was released in Germany on December 5, 2013. This comedy tells the story of two brothers, Rafik and Jamal, who have to bring the body of their deceased father from Jerusalem to Ramallah for his funeral. They only have to travel 25 km, but they have to go from Israel to Palestine and pretty much everything that can go wrong when you are traveling with a dead body does go wrong.

== Plot ==
Rafik, a Palestinian who grew up in East Jerusalem, lives in Germany and works in an Arabic restaurant. He has little desire to travel to Israel for his brother Jamal's wedding. But he accepts the invitation anyway, to do his mother a favor and because he has just lost his job. At the wedding, old arguments again break out with his short-tempered father, who dies. His father's final wish was to be buried in his birthplace near Ramallah, which is in the Palestinian Territories. Gritting their teeth, the two dissimilar and quarreling brothers undertake the daring mission of smuggling their father's body across the border in their own car. The journey itself should only take 45 minutes, but what was supposed to be a short trip turns into a hair-raising odyssey. With a lot of dark humor, the bizarre journey has the two brothers contending with the Israeli Police, a bunch of terrorists, and the Russian mafia breathing down their necks.

== Reception ==
“In his comedy '45 Minutes to Ramallah', the director takes a relaxed approach to the Middle East conflict and the prejudices between Palestinians and Israelis.”–filmstarts.de “Satirical trip through the minefield of the Middle East”–Kino-Zeit.de

== Awards ==
45 Minutes to Ramallah won the Golden Beaver and the Audience Beaver at the 2013 Biberach Film Festival.
