= Stowaways on the Ark =

1988 German animated adventure film

- German theatrical release poster
- Directed by: Wolfgang Urchs
- Written by: Wolfgang Urchs
- Story by: Ute Schoemann-Koll
- Produced by: Willi Benninger; Ute Schoemann-Koll; Michael Schoemann
- Edited by: Hannes Nikel
- Music by: Frank Pleyer
- Production companies: MS-Films; Paramount Filmproduction GmbH; Artemis Film GmbH; ZDF
- Distributed by: United International Pictures
- Release date: 24 March 1988
- Running time: 77 minutes
- Country: Germany
- Languages: German; English

Stowaways on the Ark is a 1988 German animated adventure film, released theatrically in Germany as In der Arche ist der Wurm drin (lit. The Worm Is in the Ark) by United International Pictures on 24 March 1988. It is inspired by the story of Noah's Ark from the Book of Genesis. The film was later released in the United States and Canada by Harmony Gold.

== Plot ==
An old woodworm who lives in a small piece of wood, near the top of a mountain, tells the story of his ancestors on their journey on the ark.

Willi, the oldest ancestor in the old worm's family tree, lives in a hole in a trunk, alongside his wife, Alice. One day, while both of them are eating in their house, it starts shaking. It turns out that this is one of the many trunks used to build an ark, constructed by a carpenter named Noah, who is discussing the construction plans with God. God tells him that in the ark, he and his family will be saved and that he has to save a couple from each animal species. Meanwhile, the said trunk gets cut some more so it can be placed in the ark's structure, and the couple starts panicking inside.

The construction finishes and God throws a bottle at the ark, to celebrate. It does not break, and he tries harder. It falls into the ark's deck, and termites inside the tapered cork of the bottle get strewed into the deck's floor. God manages to break a second one and instructs some crows to inform the animals about the ark. Then it is time for him to leave Noah. As Noah and his family help the animals to embark the ark, a female dragon who is carefully holding an egg tries to also embark, but while attempting to do so, her egg falls and breaks. Now she is not allowed to enter the ship, as she does not have a partner.

God sends rain to begin the flood, and the ark starts sailing. Willi discovers some dark tunnels on his way home, and fears that something terrible is going on there. As the days pass, Willi and Alice give birth to a lot of baby woodworms. The bear from the upper deck tries to breathe life into the deck by having the animals there make music with their sounds, while the one from the lower deck tries to prompt the ones there to sing, but the animals from the upper one get annoyed by the song of the others. After that, the animals are given food to eat, but they are not pleased with it, and each animal starts blaming the other deck for that.

Willi tells his children that the whole family needs to search these tunnels. The children do so, but animals from the decks hear them drilling through the wood, and once again, the bears from each deck start suspecting each other's deck for that. This relationship worsens with every happening inside the ark. Noah and his sons also realize that water is entering the storeroom, because of termites. Willi informs his children about the termites, and tells them to spread the word to other animals. They do so, but hardly anyone believes them. Meanwhile, as Willi and his children try to go to the main tunnel at the stern, he sees that the termites have captured his wife. He hears one of his children saying that the ants there can help them, as they release a smell that distracts the termites. Willi and two of his sons drill from where the ants are, to that tunnel, so the termites guarding Alice can get distracted from the smell and Willi can save her.

Suddenly, as the bears insist on blaming each other's deck for whatever is happening, some floors on the ark's inside crumble, and the animals fall down. Also, the ark starts flooding, and they start panicking. The bears from the upper and under decks find some honey and find out that it is sticky enough to plug the holes. Eventually, they become friends. Noah notices a tumulus of termites located at a part of the deck near the bow. It starts crumbling down and ends up floating in the sea. The animals try to find a way to repair the ark, and a walrus in the water instructs some whales to drag the ark to land. Noah's sons soon realize that the ark is ashore. With the water level lowered, the animals debark and the woodworm couple reunite.

After all the animals and the humans left, the woodworms stayed behind inside the ark, which became their home for many generations. Over the course of time, the ark shrank down to the remains where the old woodworm still lives today. He concluded that while many people search in vain for the remains of the ark for years, they never found it, for the more time passes, the less of the ark remains can be found.

== Cast ==
Title card.

Character	Original German version	English dub
Willi Worm	Wolfgang Ziffer	Peter Hawkins
Alice Worm	Dagmar Biener	Rosemary Miller
Noah	Arnold Marquis	Harry Towb
God	Friedrich Schoenfelder	John Graham
Old Woodworm	Heinz Theo Branding	Nigel Pegram
Grizzly Bear	Helmut Krauss	Kerry Shale
Brown Bear	Heinz Rabe	David Graham
Mrs Noah	Hannelore Minkus	Sue Sheriden
Javet	Karl Schulz	Nigel Pegram
Ham	Lutz Riedel	Peter Whitman
Max Woodpecker	Santiago Ziesmer	Unknown
Elephant	Edgar Ott	Unknown
Tiger	Kurt Goldstein	Unknown
Lion	Lothar Köster	Unknown
Raven	Eberhard Prüter	Unknown
Walrus Argos	Alexander Herzog	Unknown
Snake	Andrea Brix	Unknown
Eagle	Hermann Ebeling	Unknown
Armadillo	Hans-Helmut Müller	Unknown
Wildcat	Stefan Behrens	Unknown
Vulture	Wilfried Herbst	Unknown
Leopard	Eberhard Storeck	Unknown
Sam	Stefan Gossler	Unknown
Bert Woodworm	Tarek Helmy	Unknown
Archibald Woodworm	Simon Jäger	Unknown

== Production ==
Wolfgang Urchs initially came up with an idea for an adaptation of Candide. After the storyboard was given to the producers Dr. Ute Koll and Dr. Michael Schoemann, it was decided that it was too complex, and the producers tapped Urchs into working out an international story for children. At some point, the film was partly seized from Urchs' control. In some scenes, a model of the ark, built by Harald Kraut, one of the film's animators, is shot in live-action to be used via matte work, with live-action water, which is electronically colored. As Kraut says:

There was not much happening in animation in Germany until recently, and no studio has produced animation of an international standard. Anyone interested in good animation had to go to England or the USA... This film is going to change the situation entirely. At long last, we have set up an animation studio capable of full animation, the first in Germany.

— Harald Kraut, "Stowaways on the Ark", Animator (Spring 1988)

At the end of the film's production, the relationship between producer Michael Schoemann (who went on the direct The Magic Voyage, another German film also starring a woodworm) and Urchs was strained due to creative differences.

The footage shown on the woodworm's TV are scenes from Battlestar Galactica and the 1982 film Star Trek II: The Wrath of Khan.

A scene depicting an alpaca which can be seen in the English trailer was deleted from the final cut.

== Music ==
Stowaways On The Ark: Original Motion Picture Soundtrack

Soundtrack album by Frank Pleyer and Karel Gott
- Released: 1988
- Genres: Jazz; Children's; Stage & Screen
- Length: 62:37
- Label: JMP Records
- Producer: Siegi Pleyer (manager)

There was a European release of the film's original soundtrack in compact and vinyl discs, published by the Frank Pleyer company, Junior Musikproduktion Frank Pleyer KG. Recordings were made in Elmulab Studio, and Union Studios in Munich, and it was mastered in Tonstudio Ulrich Kraus.

=== Track listing ===
Lyrics by Fred Weyrich (tracks 1, 24, 30) and Frank Lenart (tracks 31, 33).

No.	Title	Length
1.	"Ein Altes Lied"	3:40
2.	"Mount Ararat"	2:00
3.	"The Cedar's Groove"	1:07
4.	"Earthquake For Lunch"	7:25
5.	"Building The Ark"	1:12
6.	"Naming Noah's Ark"	1:36
7.	"The Ravens Spread The Message"	1:01
8.	"Divine Farewell"	1:18
9.	"Collecting Passengers"	1:59
10.	"Willy's Cha Cha Cha"	0:37
11.	"Animal Convoy"	1:08
12.	"Mr. Polar Bear"	0:13
13.	"How To Lead An Elephant"	1:01
14.	"Poor Green Dragon"	2:03
15.	"Termite Headquarters Part 1"	0:42
16.	"A Family Matter"	1:17
17.	"Animal's Jam (Animal Dixie)"	2:58
18.	"Termite Headquarters Part 2"	1:57
19.	"Tunnel Boogie"	0:49
20.	"Ants On The March"	0:31
21.	"The Ark's On Trouble"	0:38
22.	"Say Good-Bye To Paradise"	0:21
23.	"The Children's Crusade"	2:22
24.	"Der Himmel Weint"	2:58
25.	"Alice In Captivity"	1:40
26.	"Help Is On Its Way"	1:23
27.	"Alice's Rescue"	1:21
28.	"Making Friends"	0:52
29.	"So Long Loud Mouth"	1:27
30.	"The Lazy Aristocrat"	0:23
31.	"We're Saved"	2:27
32.	"Schau Welch Ein Tag"	4:43
33.	"The Will Of Life"	3:41
34.	"A Lot Of Rain"	1:35
35.	"Time Is On Our Side"	4:43
Total length:		62:37

== Release ==
The film was featured at the 22nd Giffoni Film Festival. It was subsequently available on the German online children's streaming service, KIXI.

=== Home media ===
Under distribution by Harmony Gold, it was released in the United States by Celebrity Home Video, on May 27, 1992, on VHS (under the "Just for Kids" label), and in Latin America by Ledafilms S.A. and Argentina Home Video. In the UK, it was released on VHS by Entertainment UK and Castle Communications, under license by ADN Associates Ltd. In 2005, WVG Medien GmbH made a German DVD release. In other countries, the film was, later distributed by Atlas Film.

UIP would initially license the film to many home video distributors abroad. In Greece, it was released with subtitles on VHS, in May 1990, by Home Video Hellas. This is the only release to have the film's original theatrical poster as the cover. Atlas International later licensed it to home video distributors DG Film (Poland, VHS) and Pissanos International (Greece, DVD).

== See also ==
- The Magic Voyage - another German animated film produced by MS-Films, also starring a woodworm
