= Ali Samadi Ahadi =

- علی صمدی احدی
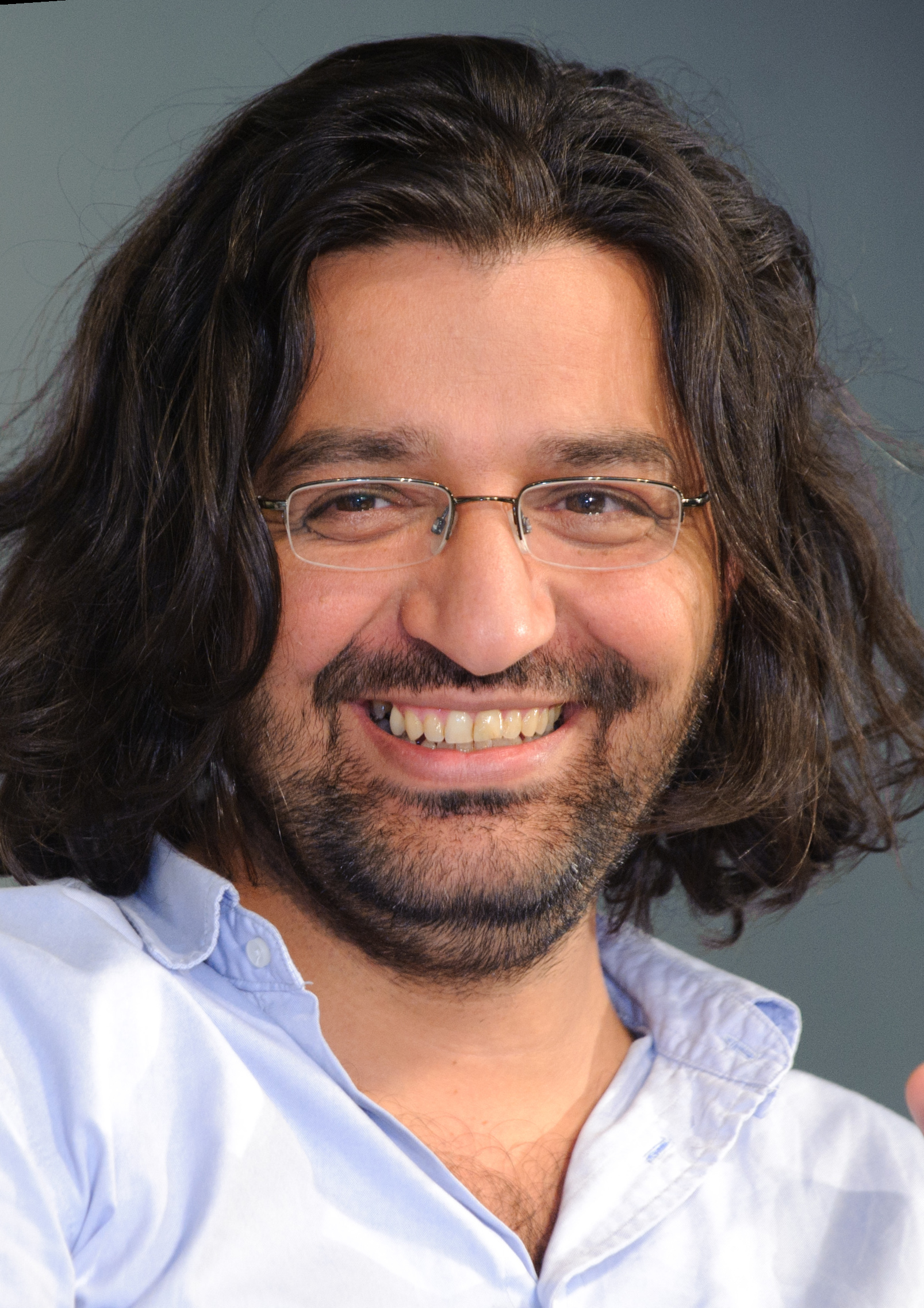
- Born: February 9, 1972 (age 53); Tabriz, Iran
- Notable work: Lost Children, Salami Aleikum, The Green Wave
- Website: www.ali-samadi-ahadi.de

Ali Samadi Ahadi (born 9 February 1972 in Tabriz, Iran) is an Iranian-German filmmaker and scriptwriter who has directed Lost Children, Salami Aleikum, The Green Wave, etc.

== Biography ==
Ali Samadi Ahadi was born in 1972 in Tabriz, Iran. He is an Iranian Azerbaijani. During Iran-Iraq War, at the age of 12 he escaped alone from home to avoid being killed in the war. He took his Abitur in Hannover and studied sociology and electronic media in Hannover. He has been working as an independent scriptwriter, director and editor. His documentary Africa Mayibuye had its premiere at the Filmfestival of Mannheim. His music documentary film Culture Clan was nominated for the Rose d'Or 2005 at the Montreux film festival.

Ali was diagnosed with leukemia in 2015 in Germany. He received the diagnosis after seeking care for "stomach pain" the same year.

== Filmography ==
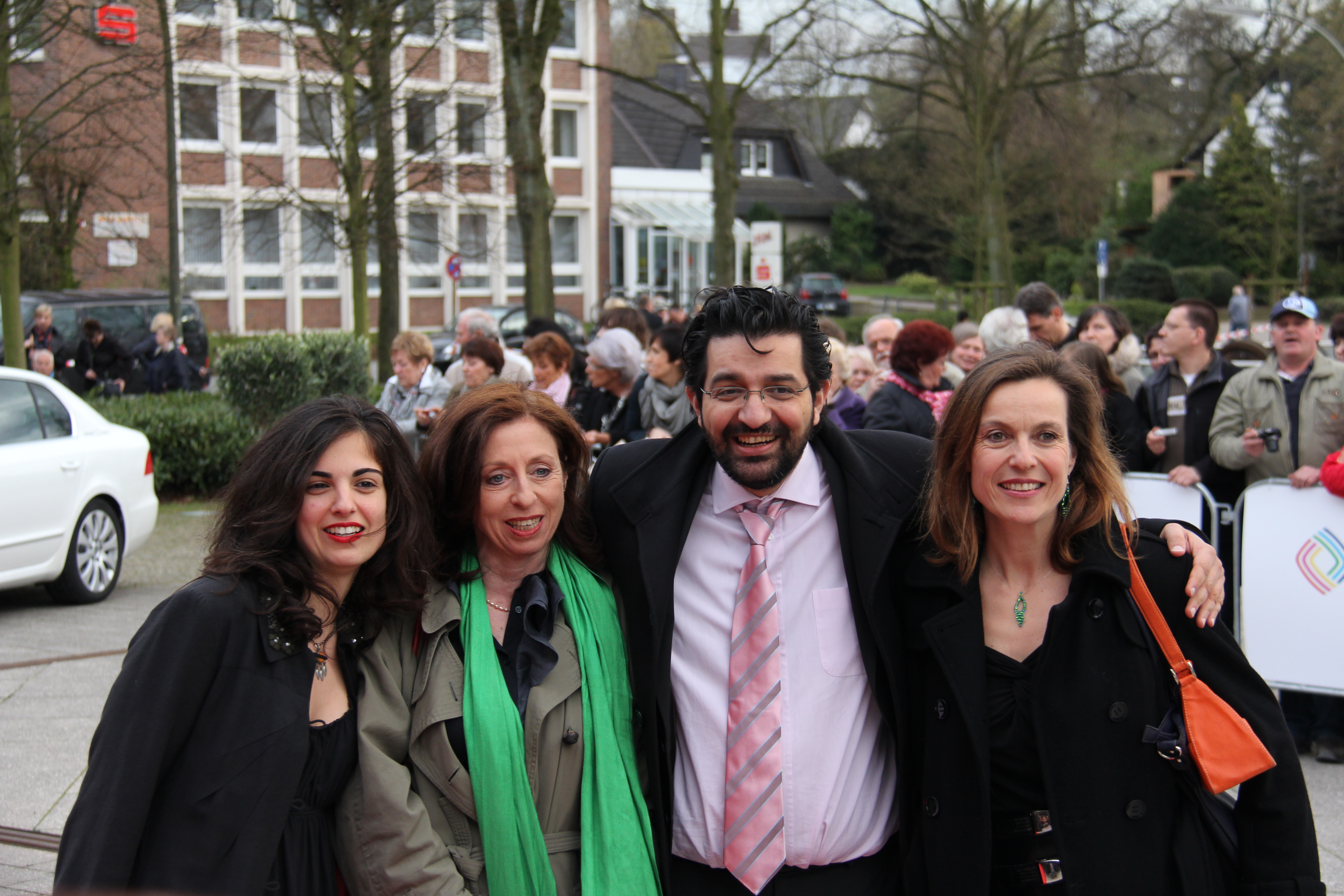
the team of documentary Iran: Elections 2009

- 1992: Leipziger Allerlei, Short film (together with Nils Loof and Rasmus Sievers)
- 1996: Geburtstag mit der Omi, Short film
- 1998: Goodbye Matze, Short film
- 2003: Culture Clan, documentary
- 2005: Lost Children, documentary (together with Oliver Stoltz)
- 2009: Salami Aleikum, Comedy, Social, Romance. mixture with animation
- 2010: Iran: Elections 2009, TV-documentary
- 2011: The Green Wave (2010 film), documentary
- 2013: 45 Minutes to Ramallah
- 2013: Pettersson und Findus - Kleiner Quälgeist, große Freundschaft (filming)
- 2021: Moonbound
- 2024: Seven Days
