= Durham Concerto =

Promotional material for the world première, Saturday 20 October 2007 at 7:30 pm, Durham Cathedral

The Durham Concerto is a classical work composed by Jon Lord. It was commissioned by Durham University and was first performed in Durham Cathedral on 20 October 2007, as part of the university's 175th anniversary celebrations.

Instead of the usual solo instrument typical of a classical concerto, the Durham Concerto gives solo opportunities to several different instruments: cello, violin, Northumbrian pipes and Hammond organ. At the premiere of the work, Lord himself played the Hammond organ part, and Kathryn Tickell the pipes.

== Movements ==
- Part I. Morning
  - The Cathedral at Dawn – solo violin, solo cello, Hammond organ
  - Durham Awakes – solo violin, solo cello, Hammond organ, Northumbrian pipes
- Part II. Afternoon
  - The Road from Lindisfarne – solo violin, solo cello, Northumbrian pipes<
  - From Prebends Bridge – solo cello
- Part III. Evening
  - Rags & Galas – solo violin, solo cello, Hammond organ
  - Durham Nocturne – solo violin, solo cello, Hammond organ, Northumbrian pipes

A typical performance lasts just under an hour.

== Recordings ==
- Royal Liverpool Philharmonic Orchestra, Mischa Damev (conductor), Matthew Barley (cello), Jon Lord (Hammond organ), Ruth Palmer (violin), Kathryn Tickell (Northumbrian pipes) • Avie • ASIN B000ZOWOCS • 28 January 2008
