= For Example =

For example may refer to:

- For Example, an album by IV Xample, 1995
- For Example Workshop Freie Musik 1969–1978, a 1979 compilation jazz LPs box featuring Bobby Few and others
- "For Example", a song by The Nice from the 1969 album Nice
- "For Example", a song by Jon Lord from the 2010 album To Notice Such Things
- "For Example", a song from the 2013 compilation album D'Kings Men
