= First of the Big Bands – BBC Live in Concert 1974 =

Live album by Tony Ashton and Jon Lord
- Released: 1993
- Recorded: September 12, 1974; London Palladium
- Genre: Rock
- Label: Windsong International
- Producer: Jeff Griffin

Tony Ashton chronology
Live in Studio (1984)	First of the Big Bands – BBC Live in Concert 1974 (1993)	Big Red and Other Love Songs (1995)

Jon Lord chronology
Gemini Suite Live (1993)	First of the Big Bands - BBC Live in Concert 1974 (1993)	The Best (1996)

First of the Big Bands – BBC Live in Concert 1974 is a live album recorded on September 12, 1974 at the London Palladium by Tony Ashton and Jon Lord and their all-star band featuring Ian Paice, Carmine Appice, Dick Parry and Max Middleton among others. The setlist features mainly songs off the album First of the Big Bands by Ashton & Lord, released in 1974. The live album was released in 1993 by Windsong International.

== Track listing ==
1. "We're Gonna Make It" (4.29)
2. "I've Been Lonely" (4.15)
3. "Silly Boy" (5.23)
4. "The Jam" (5.20)
5. "Downside Upside Down" (6.11)
6. "Shut Up" (3.42)
7. "Ballad of Mr. Giver" (7.12)
8. "Celebration" (5.29)
9. "The Resurrection Shuffle" (7.11)

== Production notes ==
- Recorded live at the London Palladium on September 12, 1974
- Produced by Jeff Griffin
- All tracks written by Jon Lord and Tony Ashton, except "I've Been Lonely" and "The Resurrection Shuffle" written by Tony Ashton
- An original sound recording made by BBC Radio 1 "Live in Concert"
- Compiled and co-ordinated by Jo Bourhill

== Personnel ==
- Tony Ashton - Hammond organ, piano, vocals
- Jon Lord - Hammond organ, piano
- Ian Paice - Drums
- Carmine Appice - Drums
- Pat Donaldson - Bass guitar
- Jim Cregan - guitar
- Ray Fenwick - guitar
- Dave Caswell - Trumpet
- Mike Davis - Trumpet
- Howie Casey - Saxophone
- Dick Parry - Saxophone
- Geoff Dolby - Saxophone
- John Mumford - Trombone
- Max Middleton - Electric piano
- Jimmy Helms - Backing vocals
- Madeline Bell - Backing vocals
- Jo-Ann Williams - Backing vocals
- Graham White - Backing vocals
- Kenny Rowe - Backing vocals
- Tony Ferguson - Backing vocals
- Roger Willis - Backing vocals
