= Pictured Within =

Studio album by Jon Lord
- Released: October 1998
- Recorded: 1997
- Studio: Maarweg Studio (Cologne)
- Length: 74:44
- Label: EMI
- Producer: Jon Lord

Jon Lord chronology
| Before I Forget (1982) | Pictured Within (1998) | Beyond the Notes (2004) |

Pictured Within was the first studio album from Deep Purple's Jon Lord in sixteen years. It features performances from Sam Brown, Miller Anderson, Pete York and Thijs van Leer among others. Pictured Within was released in October 1998 by Virgin Classics. "Wait a While", one of the few non-instrumental tracks off the album, performed by Sam Brown, was issued as a single in 1999. In addition, Jon Lord played a short tour of Germany in May 1999 to promote the album.

== Track listing ==
- Part 1 - The Valley
1. "Sunrise" (5:47)
2. "Pictured Within" (5:22) - Singer: Miller Anderson
3. "From the Windmill" (6:55)
- Part 2 - Blue Sky Dreams
1. "Circles Of Stone" (2:24)
2. "Menorca Blue" (4:10)
3. "Evening Song" (8:00) - Singer: Sam Brown
- Part 3 - Of Heroes and Heroines
1. "Music for Miriam" (4:48)
2. "Arc-En-Ciel" (4:29)
3. "Wait a While" (5:57) - Singer: Sam Brown
- Part 4 - Beneath A Higher Heaven
1. "Crystal Spa (Kyrie Eleison)" (14:40)
2. "The Mountain-Sunset" (5:24)
3. "A Different Sky" (6:49)

== Production notes ==
- All music composed by Jon Lord. Lyrics by Jon Lord ("Pictured Within") and Sam Brown ("Evening Song", "Wait a While")
- Mixed at the Everest Studios, Köln
- Recorded at Maarweg Studios, Köln, 1997
- Produced by Jon Lord
- Engineered by Frank Meyer
- Mixed by Frank Meyer and Jon Lord (assisted by Chris Heinemann)

== Personnel ==
- Jon Lord - piano
- Hagen Kuhr - cello
- Ina Stock - oboe, cor Anglais
- Frank Struck - French horn
- Rodrigo Reichel - violin
- Stefan Pintev - violin
- Vytas Sondeckis - cello
- Mike Routledge - viola
- Miller Anderson - vocal
- Sam Brown - vocal
- Mario Argandoña - percussion, voices
- Pete York - orchestral percussion
- Colin Hodgkinson - fretless bass
- Ravi - kora
- Thijs Van Leer - flute
- Rick Keller - soprano saxophone
- Sabine Van Baaren - voices
- Christina Lux-York - voices
- Serge Mailiard - voices
- Stefan Scheuss - voices
