= Beyond the Notes =

Studio album by Jon Lord
- Released: 27 September 2004
- Recorded: 14 June – 31 July 2004
- Label: EMI
- Producers: Mario Argandoña, Jon Lord

Jon Lord chronology
Pictured Within (1998)	Beyond the Notes (2004)	To Notice Such Things (2010)

Beyond the Notes is a studio album by former Deep Purple keyboard player Jon Lord, released in 2004. It features guest appearances from Frida (of ABBA), Sam Brown, Miller Anderson, Thijs van Leer, Pete York, and Trondheim Soloists.

== Track listing ==
1. "Miles Away" (7:40)
2. "De Profundis" (7:20)
3. "One from the Meadow" (8:14)
4. "Cologne Again" (6:45)
5. "I'll Send You a Postcard (Pavane for Tony)" (6:54)
6. "The Sun Will Shine Again" (4:22)
7. "A Smile When I Shook His Hand (In Memoriam George Harrison)" (7:30)
8. "November Calls" (5:03)
9. "The Telemann Experiment" (7:07)
10. "Music for Miriam (Version for String Orchestra)" (8:02)

All songs composed by Jon Lord. All lyrics by Sam Brown, except "November Calls" by Jon Lord

== Personnel ==
- Jon Lord - Piano, organ, keyboards
- Thijs van Leer - Flute
- Michael Heupel - Flute
- Paul Shigihara - Guitar
- Urs Fuchs - Bass guitar
- Mario Argandoña - Percussion, drums, backing vocals
- Matthias Krauss - Keyboards
- Gerhard Vetter - Oboe
- Andy Miles - Clarinet
- Pete York - Drums
- Emilia Amper - Nyckelharpa
- Sam Brown - Vocals ("One From The Meadow")
- Miller Anderson - Vocals ("November Calls")
- Frida - Vocals ("The Sun Will Shine Again")
- Sabine van Baaren - Backing vocals
- The Vocaleros - Voices
- Cologne String Ensemble Albert Jung
- Trondheim Soloists

== Production notes ==
- Produced by Mario Argandoña and Jon Lord
- Recorded and mixed at Hansa Haus-Studios, Bonn, Germany, June 14 - July 31, 2004
- Recordings engineered, overseen, mixed and mastered by Klaus Genuit
- "Miles Away" recordings engineered by Frank Meyer
- Additional recordings engineered by Manfred Zmarsly at Hansa Haus-Studios, and Mario Argandoña at Mo-Songs Studio, Cologne
- Strings on "The Sun Will Shine Again" recorded at Studio N, Cologne, Germany, sessions engineered by Gunter Kasper
