= Jon Lord =

English musician and composer (1941–2012)

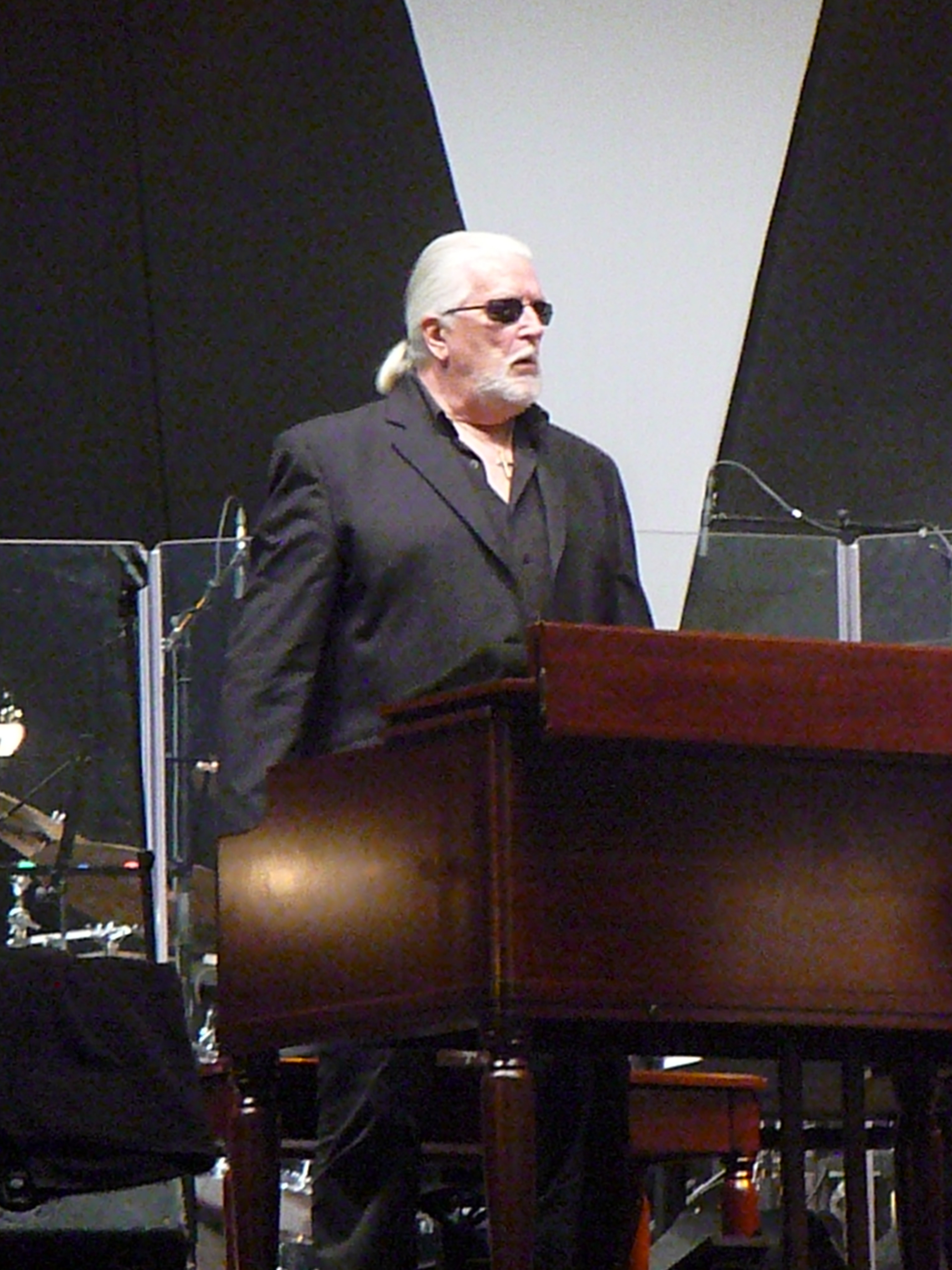
- Lord in 2010

Background information
- Born: John Douglas Lord; 9 June 1941; Leicester, England
- Died: 16 July 2012 (aged 71) London, England
- Genres: Rock; hard rock; heavy metal; blues rock; progressive rock; classical; jazz; jazz fusion
- Occupations: Musician; composer
- Instrument: Keyboards
- Years active: 1960–2012
- Labels: Purple; EMI; Harvest
- Formerly of: Deep Purple; Whitesnake; Paice Ashton Lord; The Artwoods; The Flower Pot Men

John Douglas "Jon" Lord (9 June 1941 – 16 July 2012) was an English keyboardist and composer. In 1968, Lord co-founded the hard rock band Deep Purple. Lord performed on most of the band's most popular songs; he and drummer Ian Paice were the only continuous members in the band between 1968 and 1976, and also from its revival in 1984 until his retirement in 2002. He also played for the bands Whitesnake, Paice Ashton Lord, the Artwoods, the Flower Pot Men and Santa Barbara Machine Head.

Lord became known for his pioneering work in fusing rock with classical or baroque forms, especially with Deep Purple. His distinctive organ playing during Deep Purple's hard rock period was essential to the band's signature heavy sound and contributed to the early development of heavy metal. On 11 November 2010, he was inducted as an Honorary Fellow of Stevenson College in Edinburgh, Scotland. On 15 July 2011, he was awarded an honorary Doctor of Music degree at De Montfort Hall by the University of Leicester. Lord was posthumously inducted into the Rock and Roll Hall of Fame on 8 April 2016 as a member of Deep Purple.

== Early life ==
=== Growing up in Leicester ===
Lord was born in Leicester on 9 June 1941 to Miriam (1912–1995; née Hudson) and Reginald Lord, and lived in the city until he was 20. His father was an amateur saxophonist and encouraged Lord to play music from an early age. He studied classical piano from the age of five, with a local teacher, Frederick Allt, and this focus on a classical grounding to his material was a recurring trademark in his work, in composition, in arranging and in his instrumental solos on piano, organ and electronic keyboards. In particular his influences ranged from Johann Sebastian Bach (a constant reference in his music and in his keyboard improvisation) to Medieval popular music and the English tradition of Edward Elgar. He attended Wyggeston Grammar School for Boys between 1952 and 1958 where he gained O Level passes in French, music and mathematics, participated in amateur dramatics and the school choir alongside his organ and piano studies, and then worked as a clerk in a solicitor's office for two years.

Lord absorbed the blues sounds that played a key part in his rock career, principally the raw sounds of the great American jazz and blues organists, such as Wild Bill Davis, Jimmy Smith, Jimmy McGriff ("All About My Girl") and Jack McDuff ("Rock Candy"), as well as the stage showmanship of Jerry Lee Lewis and performers like Buddy Holly, whom he saw perform at the De Montfort Hall in Leicester in March 1958. The jazz-blues organ style of black R&B organ players in the 1950s and 1960s, using the trademark blues-organ sound of the Hammond organ (B3 and C3 models) and combining it with the Leslie speaker system (the well-known Hammond-Leslie speaker combination), were seminal influences on Lord. Lord also stated that he was heavily influenced by the organ-based progressive rock played by Vanilla Fudge after seeing that band perform in Great Britain in 1967, and earlier by the personal direction he received from British organ pioneer Graham Bond.

=== Move to London ===
Lord moved to London in 1959–60, intent on an acting career and enrolling at the Central School of Speech and Drama, in London's Swiss Cottage. Following a celebrated student rebellion he became a founder of Drama Centre London, from where he graduated in 1964. Small acting parts followed, including in the British TV series, Emergency Ward 10, and Lord continued playing the piano and the organ in nightclubs and as a session musician to earn a living. He started his band career in London in 1960 with the jazz ensemble The Bill Ashton Combo. Ashton became a key figure in jazz education in Britain, creating what later became the National Youth Jazz Orchestra. Between 1960 and 1963, Lord and Ashton both moved on to Red Bludd's Bluesicians (also known as The Don Wilson Quartet), the latter of which featured the singer Arthur "Art" Wood, brother of guitarist Ronnie Wood. Wood had previously sung with Alexis Korner's Blues Incorporated and was a junior figure in the British blues movement.

Somewhere around this time, Lord altered his first name spelling from "John" to the perhaps more contemporary "Jon".

In this period, Lord's session credits included playing the keyboards in the number one song "You Really Got Me" by The Kinks, released in 1964; however in a Guitar World interview, Kinks frontman Ray Davies stated it was actually Arthur Greenslade playing piano on that particular track.

Following the break-up of Redd Bludd's Bluesicians in late 1963, Wood, Lord, and the drummer Red Dunnage put together a new band, The Art Wood Combo. This also included Derek Griffiths (guitar) and Malcolm Pool (bass guitar). Dunnage left in December 1964 to be replaced by Keef Hartley, who had previously replaced Ringo Starr in 'Rory Storm and the Hurricanes'. This band, later known as "The Artwoods", focused on the organ as the bluesy, rhythmic core of their sound, in common with the contemporary bands The Spencer Davis Group (with Steve Winwood on organ) and The Animals (with Alan Price on organ). They made appearances on the BBC's Saturday Club radio show and on such TV programs as Ready Steady Go!. They also performed abroad, and appeared on the first Ready Steady Goes Live, promoting their first single the Lead Belly song "Sweet Mary" — but significant commercial success eluded them. Their only charting single was "I Take What I Want", which reached number 28 on 8 May 1966.

This band regrouped in 1967 as the "St. Valentine's Day Massacre". This was an attempt to cash in on the 1930s gangster craze set off by the American film Bonnie and Clyde. Hartley left the band in 1967 to join John Mayall & the Bluesbreakers. Lord next founded the blues-influenced Santa Barbara Machine Head, featuring Art's younger brother, Ronnie Wood, writing and recording three powerful keyboard-driven instrumental tracks, giving a preview of the future style of Deep Purple. Soon thereafter, Lord went on to cover for the keyboard player Billy Day in The Flower Pot Men, where he met the bass guitarist Nick Simper along with drummer Carlo Little and guitarist Ged Peck. Lord and Simper then toured with this band in 1967 to promote its hit single "Let's Go to San Francisco", but the two never recorded with this band.

=== Formation of Deep Purple ===
In early 1967, through his roommate Chris Curtis of the Searchers, Lord met businessman Tony Edwards who was looking to invest in the music business alongside partners Ron Hire and John Coletta (HEC Enterprises). Session guitarist Ritchie Blackmore was called in and met Lord for the first time, but Chris Curtis's erratic behaviour led the trio nowhere. Edwards was impressed enough by Jon Lord to ask him to form a band after Curtis faded out. Said Edwards, "I couldn't really cope with [Curtis] but I had a great rapport with Jon Lord; here was somebody sensible, somebody I could communicate with on my level." Simper was contacted, and Blackmore was recalled from Hamburg. Although top British player Bobbie Clarke was the first choice as drummer, during the auditions for a singer, Rod Evans of "The Maze" came in with his own drummer, Ian Paice. Blackmore, who had been impressed by Paice's drumming when he met him in 1967, set up an audition for Paice as well. The band was called the "Roundabout" at first and began rehearsals at Deeves Hall in Hertfordshire. In March 1968, this became the "Mark 1" line-up of "Deep Purple": Lord, Simper, Blackmore, Paice, and Evans.

Lord also did session work in the late 1960s with the band "Boz", along with Blackmore (guitar) and Paice (drums), given that Boz was being produced by Derek Lawrence who produced Deep Purple's first three albums. Boz was led by Boz Burrell (vocals/guitar, later bassist for King Crimson and Bad Company) and also included Chas Hodges (bass guitar).

== Deep Purple (1968-1976/1984-2002) ==
=== 1968–1970 ===
It was in these three years that Lord's trademark keyboard sound emerged. Ignoring the emergence of the Moog synthesizer, as pioneered in rock by such players as Keith Emerson, Lord began experimenting with a keyboard sound produced by driving the Hammond organ through Marshall amplifiers in an effort to match the attack and volume of Blackmore's guitar. Lord's version was heavier than a blues sound, and it often featured distortion and a far harder, industrial type sound that became the trademark Jon Lord organ sound. Rick Wakeman publicly expressed admiration for Lord's mould-breaking work on the organ. This delivered a rhythmic foundation to complement Blackmore's speed and virtuosity on lead guitar. Lord also loved the sound of an RMI 368 Electra-Piano and Harpsichord, which he used on such songs as "Demon's Eye" and "Space Truckin'".

In 1973, Lord's original Hammond C3 malfunctioned and he bought another from Christine McVie of Fleetwood Mac. Also around this time, Lord and his keyboard technician, Mike Phillips, combined his Hammond C3 Organ with the RMI. Lord kept this particular Hammond C3 until his retirement from the band in 2002, when he passed it to successor Don Airey. That instrument was retired from stage use a few years later, as it had become "pretty knackered" according to Airey.

By pushing the Hammond-Leslie sound through Marshall amplification, Lord created a growling, heavy, mechanical sound which allowed him to compete with Blackmore as a soloist, with an organ that sounded as prominent as the lead guitar. Said one reviewer, "many have tried to imitate [Lord's] style, and all failed." Said Lord himself, "There's a way of playing a Hammond [that's] different. A lot of people make the mistake of thinking that you can play a Hammond with a piano technique. Well, you can, but it sounds like you are playing a Hammond with a piano technique. Really, you have to learn how to play an organ. It's a legato technique; it's a technique to achieve legato on a non-legato instrument."

In early Deep Purple recordings, Lord had appeared to be the leader of the band. Despite the cover songs "Hush" and "Kentucky Woman" becoming hits in North America, Deep Purple never made chart success in the UK until the Concerto for Group and Orchestra album dented the UK charts in early 1970. Lord's willingness later to play many of the key rhythm parts gave Blackmore the freedom to let loose both live and on record.

On Deep Purple's second and third albums, Lord began indulging his ambition to fuse rock with classical music. An early example of this is the song "Anthem" from the album The Book of Taliesyn (1968), but a more prominent example is the song "April" from the band's self-titled third album (1969). The song is recorded in three parts: (1) Lord and Blackmore only, on keyboards and acoustic guitar, respectively; (2) an orchestral arrangement complete with strings; and (3) the full rock band with vocals. Lord's ambition enhanced his reputation among fellow musicians, but caused tension within the group. Simper later said, "The reason the music lacked direction was Jon Lord fucked everything up with his classical ideas." Blackmore agreed to go along with Lord's experimentation, provided Blackmore was given the lead on the next band album.

The resulting Lord-composed Concerto For Group and Orchestra was one of rock's earliest attempts to fuse two distinct musical idioms. Performed live at the Royal Albert Hall on 24 September 1969 (with new band members Ian Gillan and Roger Glover, Evans and Simper having been fired), it was recorded by the BBC and later released as an album in December 1969. Concerto gave Deep Purple their first highly publicised taste of mainstream fame and gave Lord the confidence to believe that his experiment and his compositional skill had a future, as well as giving Lord the opportunity to work with established classical figures, such as conductor Sir Malcolm Arnold, who brought his skills to bear by helping Lord realise the work and to protect him from the inevitable disdain of the older members of the orchestra.

=== 1970–1976 ===
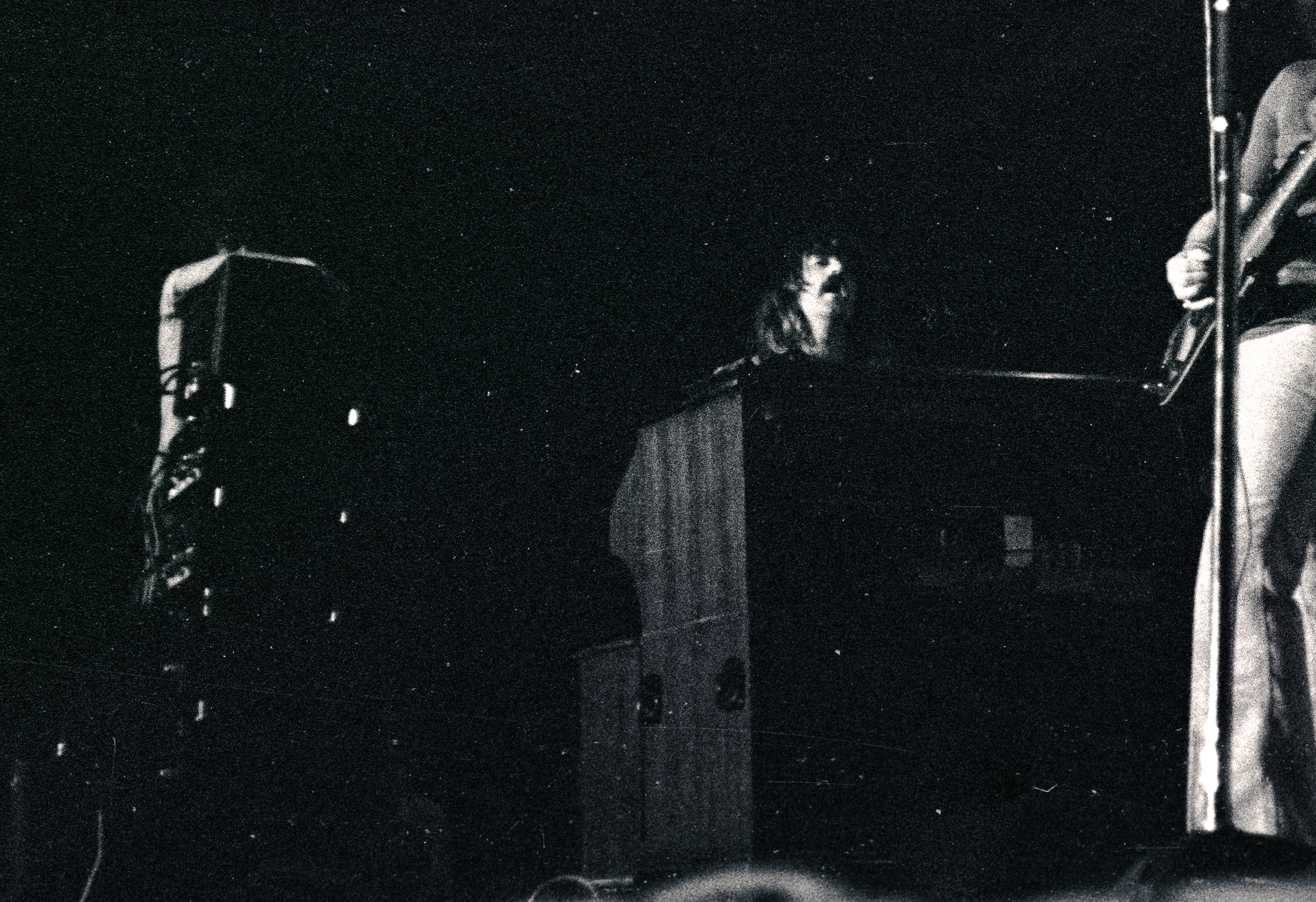
Lord with Deep Purple on tour at the Niedersachsenhalle, Hanover, Germany, 1970

Purple began work on Deep Purple in Rock, released by their new label Harvest in 1970 and now recognised as one of hard rock's key early works. Lord and Blackmore competed to out-dazzle each other, often in classical-style, midsection 'call and answer' improvisation (on tracks like "Speed King" and "Bloodsucker"), something they employed to great effect live. Ian Gillan said that Lord provided the idea on the main organ riff for "Child in Time" although the riff was also based on It's a Beautiful Day's 1969 psychedelic hit song "Bombay Calling". Lord's experimental solo on "Hard Lovin' Man" (complete with police-siren interpolation) from this album was his personal favourite among his Deep Purple studio performances.

Deep Purple released another six studio albums between 1971 (Fireball) and 1975 (Come Taste the Band). Gillan and Glover left in 1973 and Blackmore in 1975, and the band disintegrated in 1976. The highlights of Lord's Purple work in the period include the 1972 album Machine Head (featuring his rhythmic underpinnings on "Smoke on the Water" and "Space Truckin'", plus the organ solos on "Highway Star", "Pictures of Home" and "Lazy"), the sonic bombast of the Made in Japan live album (1972), an extended, effect-laden solo on "Rat Bat Blue" from the Who Do We Think We Are album (1973), and his overall playing on the Burn album from 1974.

Roger Glover would later describe Lord as a true "Zen-archer soloist", someone whose best keyboard improvisation often came at the first attempt. Lord's strict reliance on the Hammond C3 organ sound, as opposed to the synthesizer experimentation of his contemporaries, places him firmly in the jazz-blues category as a band musician and far from the progressive-rock sound of Keith Emerson and Rick Wakeman. Lord rarely ventured into the synthesizer territory on Purple albums, often limiting his experimentation to the use of the ring modulator with the Hammond, to give live performances on tracks like "Space Truckin'" a distinctive 'spacey' sound. Instances of his Deep Purple synthesizer use (he became an endorser of the ARP Odyssey) include "'A' 200", the final track from Burn, and "Love Child" on the Come Taste the Band album.

In early 1973 Lord stated: "We're as valid as anything by Beethoven."

== As a composer ==
Lord continued to focus on his classical aspirations alongside his Deep Purple career. The BBC, buoyed by the success of the Concerto, commissioned him to write another piece and the resulting "Gemini Suite" was performed by Deep Purple and the Light Music Society under Malcolm Arnold at the Royal Festival Hall in September 1970, and then in Munich with the Kammerorchester conducted by Eberhard Schoener in January 1972. It then became the basis for Lord's first solo album, Gemini Suite, released in November 1972, with vocals by Yvonne Elliman and Tony Ashton and with the London Symphony Orchestra backing a band that included Albert Lee on guitar.

Lord's collaboration with the highly experimental and supportive Schoener resulted in a second live performance of the Suite in late 1973 and a new Lord album with Schoener, entitled Windows, in 1974. It proved to be Lord's most experimental work and was released to mixed reactions. However, the dalliances with Bach on Windows and the pleasure of collaborating with Schoener resulted in perhaps Lord's most confident solo work and perhaps his strongest orchestral album, Sarabande, recorded in Germany in September 1975 with the Philharmonia Hungarica conducted by Schoener. Composed of eight pieces (from the opening sweep of Fantasia to the Finale), at least five pieces form the typical construction of a baroque dance suite. The key pieces (Sarabande, Gigue, Bouree, Pavane and Caprice) feature rich orchestration complemented sometimes by the interpolation of rock themes, played by a session band comprising Pete York, Mark Nauseef and Andy Summers, with organ and synthesizers played by Lord.

In March 1974, Lord and Paice had collaborated with friend Tony Ashton on First of the Big Bands, credited to 'Tony Ashton & Jon Lord' and featuring a rich array of session talent, including Carmine Appice, Ian Paice, Peter Frampton, and Pink Floyd saxophonist/sessioner Dick Parry. They performed much of the set live at the London Palladium in September 1974.

This formed the basis of Lord's first post-Deep Purple project Paice Ashton Lord, which lasted only a year and spawned a single album, Malice in Wonderland in 1977, recorded at Musicland Studios at the Arabella Hotel in Munich. A second album was begun but subsequently abandoned. He created an informal group of friends and collaborators including Ashton, Paice, Bernie Marsden, Boz Burrell and later, Bad Company's Mick Ralphs, Simon Kirke and others. Over the same period, Lord guested on albums by Maggie Bell, Nazareth and even folk artist Richard Digance.

Lord also guested as one of several keyboard players on the live performance of David Bedford's The Odyssey. The composer and musician (The Orchestral Tubular Bells (1975), Star's End (1974), The Rime Of The Ancient Mariner (1975)), performed a live concert of a musical version of Homer's play, at the Royal Albert Hall on 25 January 1977. Andy Summers, who found fame in The Police, played guitar on the Odyssey studio recording and asked Lord to be one of the keyboard players for this concert. The set began with a cut down live version of Sarabande, on which Summers had played on the studio recording session in September 1975.

Eager to pay off a huge tax bill upon his return the UK in the late-1970s (Purple's excesses included their own tour jet and a home Lord rented in Malibu from actress Ann-Margret and where he wrote the Sarabande album), Lord joined former Deep Purple band member David Coverdale's new band, Whitesnake in August 1978 (Ian Paice joined them in 1980 and stayed until 1982).

== Whitesnake, 1978–1984 ==
Lord's job in Whitesnake was largely limited to adding colour to round out a blues-rock sound that already accommodated two lead guitarists, Bernie Marsden and Micky Moody. He added a Yamaha CP-70 electric piano to his set-up and finally a huge bank of synthesizers onstage courtesy of Moog (Minimoog, Opus, Polymoog) so he could play the 12-bar blues the band often required and recreate string section and other effects. Such varied work is evident on tracks like "Here I Go Again", "Wine, Women and Song", "She's a Woman" and "Till the Day I Die". A number of singles entered the UK chart, taking the now 30-something Lord onto Top of the Pops with regularity between 1980 and 1983. He described himself as a poorly paid hired hand, but fans saw little of this discord and Whitesnake's commercial success kept him at the forefront of readers' polls as heavy rock's foremost keyboard maestro. His dissatisfaction (and Coverdale's eagerness to revamp the band's line-up and lower the average age to help crack the US market) led to the reunion of Deep Purple Mk II in 1984.

Jon Lord's last Whitesnake concert took place in the Swedish TV programme Måndagsbörsen on 16 April 1984.

While with Whitesnake, Lord also recorded two solo albums. 1982's Before I Forget featured a largely conventional eight-song line-up, no orchestra and with the bulk of the songs being either mainstream rock tracks ("Hollywood Rock And Roll", "Chance on a Feeling"), or – specifically on side two – songs sung by the mother and daughter duo Vicki Brown and Sam Brown and vocalist Elmer Gantry as well as piano and synthesiser instrumentals such as "Burntwood", named after Lord's stately Oxfordshire home at the time. The album also boasted the cream of British rock talent, including the session drummer (and National Youth Jazz Orchestra alumnus) Simon Phillips, Cozy Powell, Neil Murray, Simon Kirke, Boz Burrell and Mick Ralphs.

Additionally, Lord was commissioned by producer Patrick Gamble for Central Television to write the soundtrack for their 1984 TV series, Country Diary of an Edwardian Lady using themes composed by Lord. Lord became firmly established as a member of UK rock's "Oxfordshire mansion aristocracy" – with a home, Burntwood Hall, set in 23.5 acres (9.5 ha) at Goring-on-Thames, complete with its own cricket pitch and a hand-painted Challen baby grand piano previously owned by Shirley Bassey. He was asked to guest on albums by friends George Harrison (Gone Troppo from 1982) and Pink Floyd's David Gilmour (1984's About Face), Cozy Powell (Octopuss in 1983) and to play on an adaptation of Kenneth Grahame's 1908 classic, The Wind in the Willows. He composed and produced the score for White Fire (1984), which consisted largely of two songs performed by Limelight.

In the 1980s he was also a member of an all-star band called Olympic Rock & Blues Circus. Some musicians, including Lord, took part in Pete York's TV musical extravaganza Superdrumming between 1987 and 1989.

== Later work, 1984–2006 ==
Lord's re-emergence with Deep Purple in 1984 resulted in huge audiences for the reformed "Mk II" line-up, including 1985's second largest grossing tour in the US and an appearance in front of 80,000 rain-soaked fans headlining Knebworth on 22 June 1985, all to support the Perfect Strangers album. Playing with a rejuvenated Purple (including spells at a health farm to get the band, including Lord, into shape) and being onstage and in the studio with Blackmore, gave Lord the chance to push himself once again. His 'rubato' classical opening sequence to the album's opener, "Knocking at Your Back Door" (complete with F-Minor to G polychordal harmony sequence), gave Lord the chance to do his most powerful work for years, including the song "Perfect Strangers". Further Deep Purple albums followed, often of varying quality, and by the late-1990s, Lord was clearly keen to explore new avenues for his musical career.

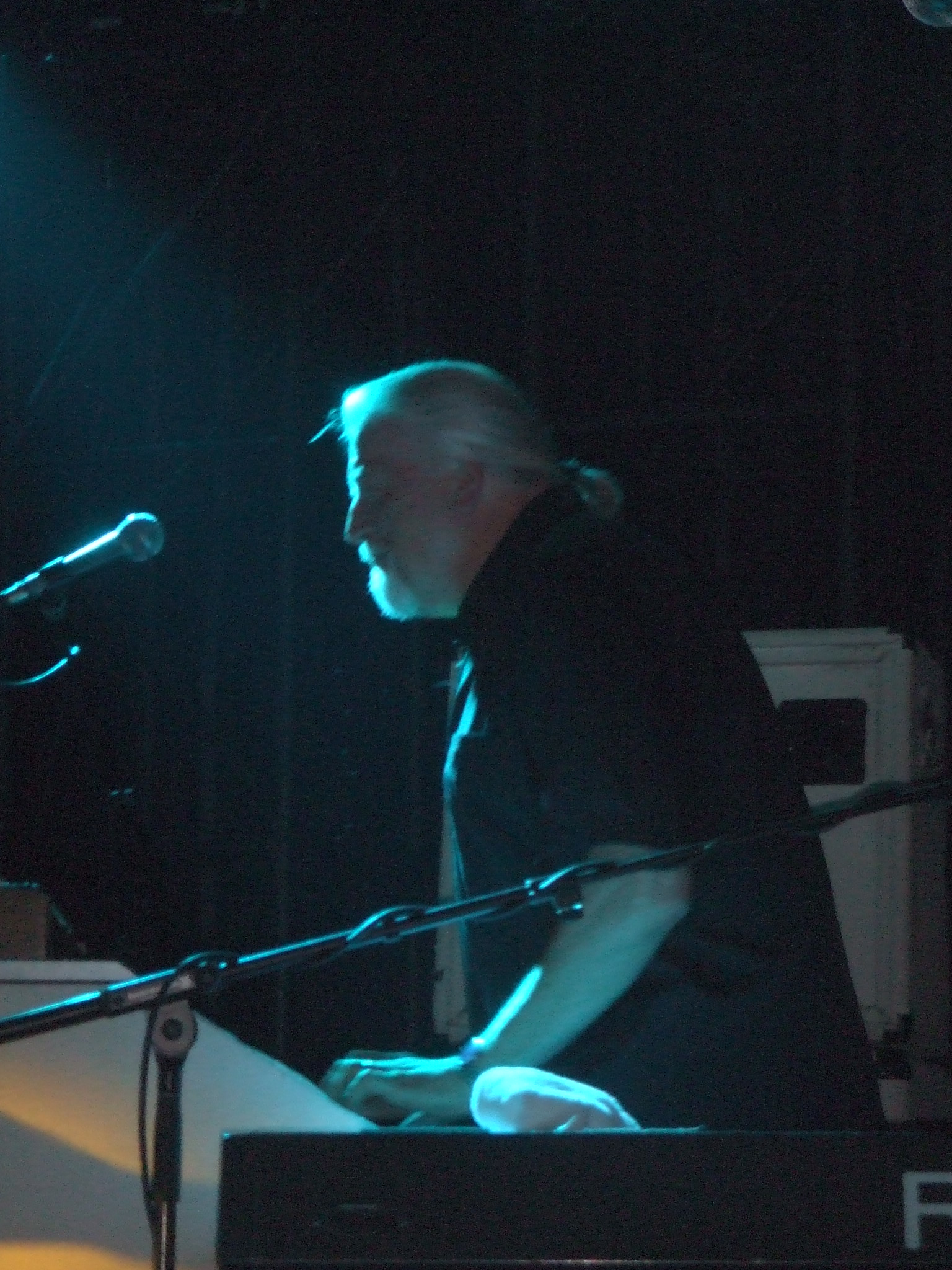
Lord performing for The Sunflower Jam, London, 2007

In 1997, he created perhaps his most personal work to date, Pictured Within, released in 1998 with a European tour to support it. Lord's mother Miriam had died in August 1995 and the album is inflected at all stages by Lord's sense of grief. Recorded largely in Lord's home-away-from-home, the city of Cologne, the album's themes are Elgarian and alpine in equal measure. Lord signed to Virgin Classics to release it, and perhaps saw it as the first stage in his eventual departure from Purple to embark on a low-key and altogether more gentle solo career. One song from Pictured Within, entitled "Wait A While", was later covered by Norwegian singer Sissel Kyrkjebø on her 2003/2004 album My Heart.

Lord finally retired from Deep Purple amicably after their UK tour in February 2002, preceded by a knee injury that eventually resolved itself without surgery and which brought keyboardist Don Airey into the band, initially as his temporary replacement. He said subsequently, "Leaving Deep Purple was just as traumatic as I had always suspected it would be and more so – if you see what I mean". He even dedicated a song to it on 2004's solo effort, Beyond the Notes, called "De Profundis". The album was recorded in Bonn with producer Mario Argandoña between June and July 2004.

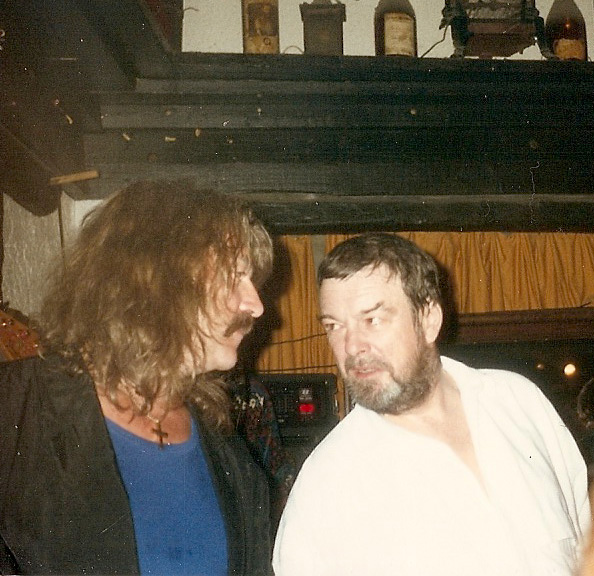
Tony Ashton (right) with Lord at a gig at the Hotel Post, March 1990

Pictured Within and Beyond the Notes provide the most personal work by Lord. He collaborated with former ABBA superstar and family friend Frida (Anni-Frid Lyngstad) on the 2004 track, "The Sun Will Shine Again" (with lyrics by Sam Brown), and performed with her across Europe. He subsequently also performed European concerts to première the 2007-scheduled orchestral piece Boom of the Tingling Strings.

In 2003 he also returned to his beloved R&B and blues heritage to record an album of standards in Sydney, with Australia's Jimmy Barnes, entitled Live in the Basement, by Jon Lord and the Hoochie Coochie Men. Lord was also happy to support the Sam Buxton Sunflower Jam Healing Trust and in September 2006, performed at a star-studded event to support the charity led by Ian Paice's wife, Jacky (twin sister of Lord's wife Vicky). Featured artists on stage with Lord included Paul Weller, Robert Plant, Phil Manzanera, Ian Paice and Bernie Marsden.

== Final work, after 2006 ==
Two Lord compositions, Boom of the Tingling Strings and "Disguises (Suite for String Orchestra)", were recorded in Denmark in 2006 and released in April 2008 on EMI Classics. Both featured the Odense orchestra, conducted by Paul Mann. Additionally, a second Hoochie Coochie Men album was recorded in July 2006 in London. This album, Danger – White Men Dancing, was released in October 2007. His Durham Concerto, commissioned by Durham University for its 175th anniversary celebrations, received its world premiere on 20 October 2007 in Durham Cathedral by the Royal Liverpool Philharmonic Orchestra, and featured soloists Lord on Hammond Organ, Kathryn Tickell on Northumbrian pipes, Matthew Barley on cello and Ruth Palmer on violin. It became a hit in Classic FM's "Hall of Fame", alongside his piano concerto Boom of the Tingling Strings.

Lord played piano on George Harrison's posthumously released Brainwashed album (2002) and became an important member of Harrison's social circle at Friar Park in Oxfordshire (Lord by now living first at Yewden Lodge in Hambleden and then at the time of his death at Hill House, in Fawley, Henley-On-Thames), the two having first met at Abbey Road studios in the early 1970s. He was also a close friend of Sir John Mortimer, the English barrister, dramatist, screenwriter, author and creator of British television series Rumpole of the Bailey, whom he had accompanied on many occasions during Mortimer's performances of "Mortimer Miscellany." In 2007, Lord joined Derek Griffiths, Colin Martin and Malcolm Pool at an Artwoods reunion at the ART Tribute night, at York House in Twickenham. Ali Mackenzie took over Art Wood's role on vocals, and Chris Hunt played drums. They were joined on stage by guitarist Ronnie Wood and vocalist Geno Washington. Lord released his solo album To Notice Such Things on 29 March 2010. Titled after the main work — a six-movement suite for solo flute, piano and string orchestra — the album was inspired by, and was dedicated to the memory of Sir John Mortimer, who died in January 2009. On its first day of release, the album entered Amazon's Movers And Shakers index, reaching No. 12 at the end of the day. Six days later it entered the UK's official classical chart at No. 4. Lord had been commissioned to compose a concerto for Hammond organ and orchestra with special parts for tympani. The piece was to be premiered with the Oslo Philharmonic Orchestra with Tom Vissgren on tympani in Oslo, Norway in Spring 2012. With Vladimir Ashkenazy and Josef Suk, Lord was one of three artistic sponsors of Toccata Classics.

Between 2008 and 2011, Lord performed at arts festivals ranging from Lichfield and Shipley in the UK to the Virada Cultural Festival in Brazil. On 1 September 2009, he opened the Fall Arts Salon at the ancient Roman Theatre in Plovdiv, Bulgaria, performing with the Plovdiv Philharmonic Orchestra under conductor Nayden Todorov. On 5 November 2009, Lord performed at the Palace Hall in Bucharest, Romania, with the Rousse Philharmonic Orchestra, again conducted by Nayden Todorov; the concert was released in 2011 as a live album and DVD, and subsequently reissued on vinyl. On 30 October 2010, Lord returned to Bulgaria for a concert at the National Palace of Culture in Sofia, with the Sofia Philharmonic Orchestra once again conducted by Nayden Todorov.

In July 2011, Lord performed his final live concert appearance, the Sunflower Jam at the Royal Albert Hall, where he premiered his joint composition, "It's not as big as it was", with Rick Wakeman. At that point, they had begun informal discussion on recording an album together. Up until 2011, Lord had also been working on material with recently formed rock supergroup WhoCares, also featuring singer Ian Gillan from Deep Purple, guitarist Tony Iommi from Black Sabbath, second guitarist Mikko Lindström from HIM, bassist Jason Newsted formerly from Metallica, and drummer Nicko McBrain from Iron Maiden, specifically the composition "Out of My Mind," in addition to new compositions with Steve Balsamo and a Hammond Organ concerto. Lord subsequently cancelled a performance of his "Durham Concerto" in Hagen, Germany, for what his website said was a continuation of his medical treatment (the concert, scheduled for 6 July 2012, would have been his return to live performance after treatment).

Lord's Concerto for Group and Orchestra was effectively recommissioned by him, recorded in Liverpool and at Abbey Road Studios across 2011 and under post-production in 2012 with the Liverpool Philharmonic Orchestra performing, conducted by long-time collaborator, conductor Paul Mann. The recording was at completion at the time of Lord's death, with Lord having been able to review the final master recordings. The album and DVD were subsequently released in 2012.

== Personal life ==
Lord has a younger brother, Stephen. Lord's first marriage, from 1969 to 1975, was to Judith Feldman, with whom he had one daughter, Sara. Lord's second wife, Victoria Frances Gibbs (died 2025), was a former girlfriend of Deep Purple bandmate Glenn Hughes and twin sister of Ian Paice's wife, Jacqueline. The couple had a daughter, Amy.

== Illness and death ==
In July 2011, Lord was diagnosed with pancreatic cancer. After treatment in both England and in Israel, he died on 16 July 2012 at the London Clinic following a pulmonary embolism. His internment was at the new churchyard of Saint Mary the Virgin Church in Hambleden.

== Influence and legacy ==
Lars Ulrich, founding member and drummer in Metallica commented, "Ever since my father took me to see them in 1973 in Copenhagen, at the impressionable age of 9, Deep Purple has been the most constant, continuous and inspiring musical presence in my life. They have meant more to me than any other band in existence, and have had an enormous part in shaping who I am. We can all be guilty of lightly throwing adjectives like 'unique,' 'one-of-a-kind' and 'pioneering' around when we want to describe our heroes and the people who've moved us, but there are no more fitting words than those right now and there simply was no musician like Jon Lord in the history of hard rock. Nobody. Period. There was nobody that played like him. There was nobody that sounded like him. There was nobody that wrote like him. There was nobody that looked like him. There was nobody more articulate, gentlemanly, warm, or fucking cooler that ever played keyboards or got anywhere near a keyboard. What he did was all his own."

Interviewed in 2012 for Blabbermouth.net, Motörhead frontman Lemmy said: "It's just a shame, because Jon Lord was, to a large extent, responsible for me being in rock and roll. He was in a band called the Artwoods years ago, with Ronnie Wood's brother Arthur. They were sort of a jazz-blues band, I guess. They played at the place in Wales where I was living, (Note: Probably Conwy, to where his family moved when Lemmy left school) this dingy little boozer, and I was talking to Jon and, like an idiot, he gave me his address in London. So, of course, I went down there and he wasn't there, but he was living at Art's mother's house where Ronnie Wood who was in a band called The Birds was living and they let me crash on the couch.... I saw him late last year in a hotel in Germany in Cologne. He was over there doing some orchestral stuff, and we talked in the bar for awhile.... I'm glad I saw him, since he's since departed."

Also in 2012, music critic Terence Towles Canote wrote shortly after Lord's death: "While many of his contemporaries would turn to the Moog synthesiser, Jon Lord continued to rely primarily on the Hammond organ. Of course, it must be pointed out that Jon Lord could make a Hammond organ do things that other keyboardists could only dream about. Jon Lord's playing not only stood out from the pack, it also held up over time. As a youth in the Eighties I could listen to old Deep Purple songs and they would not sound dated at all. It is an incredible achievement for any artist to create works that are essentially timeless, and that is precisely what Jon Lord did."

Former keyboard player of the rock band Yes, Rick Wakeman, who was a friend of Lord's, said he was "a great fan" and added "We were going to write and record an album before he became ill. His contribution to music and to classic rock was immeasurable and I will miss him terribly." In mid-2013, Wakeman presented a BBC One East Midlands-produced TV programme about Lord and his connection to the town of his birth.

Vocalist Anni-Frid Lyngstad of Abba described Jon Lord as her "dearest friend" and paid him tribute at the 2013 Zermatt Unplugged music festival, an annual event for which she and Lord served as patrons. "He was graceful, intelligent, polite, with a strong integrity," she said. "(He) had a strong empathy and a great deal of humour for his own and other people's weaknesses."

Keyboardist Keith Emerson said of Lord's death, "Jon left us now but his music and inspiration will live forever. I am deeply saddened by his departure." In a later interview in November 2013, he added, "In the early years I remember being quite jealous of Jon Lord – may he rest in peace. In September 1969 I heard he was debuting his "Concerto For Group & Orchestra" at the Royal Albert Hall, with none other than Malcolm Arnold conducting. Wow! I had to go along and see that. Jon and I ribbed each other, we were pretty much pals, but I walked away and thought: 'Shit, in a couple of weeks' time I'm going to be recording The Nice's Five Bridges Suite ... not at the Albert Hall but at the Fairfield Halls, Croydon!' A much more prosaic venue. Later, Jon wanted me to play on his solo album, Gemini Suite, but that was around the time ELP were breaking big and we were touring. He was a lovely guy, a real gentleman."

A tribute concert to Lord took place on 4 April 2014 at the Royal Albert Hall. Performers and presenters included Deep Purple, Bob Harris, Paul Weller, Bruce Dickinson, Alfie Boe, Jeremy Irons, Rick Wakeman, Joe Brown, Glenn Hughes, Kasia Laska, Miller Anderson and Steve Balsamo. Musical Director of the event was Paul Wix Wickens and the performance featured the Orion Orchestra conducted by Paul Mann.

In December 2012 the Mayor of Leicester, Sir Peter Soulsby, joined the campaign to honour Lord with a blue plaque at his childhood home at 120 Averill Road, where he lived until he was 20 years old, saying it would be "an important reminder of the city's contribution to the world of contemporary music."

Lord was posthumously inducted into the Rock and Roll Hall of Fame as a member of Deep Purple in April 2016.

In May 2019 Lord was posthumously awarded an Ivor Novello Award for International Achievement along with the surviving members of the Deep Purple MK II line up, at a ceremony at the Grosvenor House Hotel in London.

The Concerto For Group and Orchestra is toured regularly with Paul Mann conducting. Most recently in March and April 2023, a European and Brazilian tour took place across 11 dates in cities including Bucharest, Sofia, Zagreb and São Paulo featuring Bruce Dickinson performing the vocal parts. Members of Orquestra Sinfônica do Estado de São Paulo featured alongside Kaitner Z Doka on guitar, Bernhard Welz on drums, John O'Hara (Jethro Tull) on keyboards, Tanya O'Callaghan (Whitesnake) on bass and Mario Argandoña on percussion.

== Discography ==
=== Sessions ===
- 1964 Kinks (The Kinks, "You Really Got Me", piano, claimed by Lord himself, also organ on "Bald Headed Woman")
- 1967 Sound & Movement (The Leading Figures)
- 1968 I Shall Be Released/Down in the Flood (Boz Burrell, SP)
- 1968 Sun Dragon (Sun Dragon)
- 1968 Madena/Standing Still (Anan, SP)

=== Santa Barbara Machine Head ===
- 1968 Blues Anytime Vol. 3 ("Porcupine Juice", "Albert", "Rubber Monkey")

=== Solo and orchestral works with Deep Purple ===
- 1969 Concerto for Group and Orchestra (with Deep Purple)
- 1971 The Last Rebel (with Ashton, Gardner & Dyke) – motion picture soundtrack
- 1971 Gemini Suite
- 1974 First of the Big Bands (with Tony Ashton)
- 1974 Windows (with Eberhard Schoener, recorded live)
- 1976 Sarabande
- 1982 Before I Forget
- 1984 Country Diary of an Edwardian Lady (with Alfred Ralston) – TV series soundtrack
- 1993 Gemini Suite Live (with Deep Purple, recorded live in 1970)
- 1993 First of the Big Bands - BBC Live in Concert 1974 (with Tony Ashton, recorded live)
- 1998 Pictured Within
- 2000 In Concert with The London Symphony Orchestra (with Deep Purple, recorded live)
- 2003 Jon Lord With Pictures (DVD documentary)
- 2004 Beyond The Notes
- 2004 Beyond The Notes Live (DVD, recorded live)
- 2007 Durham Concerto
- 2008 Boom of the Tingling Strings
- 2010 To Notice Such Things
- 2011 Jon Lord Blues Project Live (recorded live in 2010)
- 2011 Jon Lord Live (recorded live in 2009)
- 2012 Concerto for Group and Orchestra (new studio version)

=== with The Hoochie Coochie Men ===
- 2003 Live at the Basement (recorded live)
- 2007 Danger – White Men Dancing

=== Film and TV appearances ===
- 1985 Water, (as himself, member of "The Singing Rebels' Band")
- 1991 Deep Purple – Heavy Metal Pioneers (Warner, interviewee)
- 1995 Rock Family Trees, ep. Deep Purple (BBC, interviewee)
- 2002 Classic Albums, ep. Deep Purple – Machine Head' (ITV, interviewee)
- 2004 The South Bank Show, ep. Malcolm Arnold – Toward the Unknown Region (ITV, interviewee)
- 2007 Ian Gillan: Highway Star – A Journey in Rock (feature documentary, interviewee)
- 2009 John Mortimer – A Life in Words (BBC, interviewee)
- 2009 Soul To Song, ep. Smoke on the Water (Japanese TV, interviewee)
- 2010 Heavy Metal Britannia (BBC, interviewee)
- 2010 I'm in a Rock n' Roll Band, ep. The Other One (BBC, interviewee)
- 2011 Metal Evolution (SkyArts, interviewee)
- 2011 How the Brits Rocked America, ep. Stairway to Heaven (BBC, interviewee)
- 2013 Deep Purple Remastered, ep. Deep Purple (VH1, interviewee)
- 2013 Jon Lord: It's All Music (BBC, interviewee)

=== Other credits ===
- 1972 What a Bloody Long Day It's Been (Ashton, Gardner & Dyke, "The Falling Song" – strings arr.)
- 1974 Rampant (Nazareth, "Glad When You're Gone", "Shanghai'd in Shanghai")
- 1975 American Blues Legends 1975 ("Biscuit Bakin' Mama", "Bury Me Back in the USA" – recorded live in 1975)
- 1975 Get Off II (NAPRA, with Ian Paice)
- 1976 Wizard's Convention (Eddie Hardin)
- 1978 More Than Meets the Eye (Joe Breen)
- 1979 Commercial Road (Richard Digance)
- 1979 And About Time Too (Bernie Marsden)
- 1980 Look at Me Now (Bernie Marsden)
- 1981 Line-Up (Graham Bonnet, "Don't Stand in the Open")
- 1982 Gone Troppo (George Harrison, "Circles")
- 1983 Octopuss (Cozy Powell)
- 1984 About Face (David Gilmour)
- 1985 The Wind in the Willows (Eddie Hardin)
- 1986 Detroit Diesel (Alvin Lee, "Ordinary Man", "Let's Go")
- 1989 Super Drumming Folge 1 & 2 (Pete York)
- 1990 Rock Aid Armenia – The Earthquake Album ("Smoke on the Water '90")
- 1990 About Love and Life (Vicki Brown, "We Are One")
- 1990 April Moon (Sam Brown, "Contradictions")
- 1990 Pete York Presents Super Drumming Volume 3 ("I Got Rhythm", "Heavy Ravel", "Gemini – Voice", "Windows")
- 1992 Cherkazoo & Other Stories (Ian Gillan, archival recordings 1972–74)
- 1992 The Wind in the Willows – A Rock Concert (Eddie Hardin, recorded live in 1991, DVD ed. 2003)
- 1992 The Drums Are Back (Cozy Powell, "The Rocket", "The Legend of the Glass Mountain")
- 1992 Zoom (Alvin Lee, "Real Life Blues", "Wake Up Moma")
- 1994 Carnival of Light (Ride, "Moonlight Medicine")
- 1994 How Does It Feel to Feel (Ride, EP, "Journey to the End of Universe")
- 1995 Still a Few Pages Left (Hardin & York, "Stuck on You")
- 2002 Brainwashed (George Harrison, "Brainwashed")
- 2003 Bluesheart (Miller Anderson, "Help Me", "Runnin' Blues")
- 2005 Legends of Rock – 50 Jahre Rock (CD/DVD, recorded live in 2004)
- 2005 Min Jul (Maria Arredondo, arrangements)
- 2006 Gillan's Inn (Ian Gillan, "When A Blind Man Cries", "Demon's Eye", "Smoke on the Water")
- 2008 Army of One (Espen Lind, "Sweet Love", "The Music Takes You There")
- 2009 Endangered Species – Live at Abbey Road 2000 (Tony Ashton & Friends, CD/DVD)
- 2009 Childline Rocks 2009 ("Pictured Within", "Child in Time", "You Keep on Moving")
- 2010 Stay Tuned (Bernhard Welz, "Child in Time")
- 2011 Dance (The Smith Quartet, writer of "Zarabanda Solitaria")
- 2011 Out of My Mind (WhoCares, charity CD single)
- 2011 The Odyssey, Live (David Bedford, recorded live in 1977)
- 2013 The Sunflower Jam 2012 (incl. JL's performance from 2011)
- 2013 BudaBest (Mandoki Soulmates)
- 2014 Celebrating Jon Lord (VA)
- 2016 Music for My Love - Celebrating the Life of a Special Woman (100+ New Works for String Orchestra, Vol. 1, writer of "Zarabanda Solitaria" - string vsn)
