= Boom of the Tingling Strings =

Piano concerto

Boom of the Tingling Strings is a piano concerto in four movements written by Jon Lord. Its first version was finished in November 2002, soon after Lord had left Deep Purple. The premiere performance of the concerto took place in Brisbane, Australia in February 2003, with pianist Michael Kieran Harvey and The Queensland Orchestra conducted by Paul Mann.

In December 2006 Boom of the Tingling Strings was recorded in Odense, Denmark with pianist Nelson Goerner and Odense Symfoniorkester conducted by Paul Mann. In March 2008 it was released on CD by EMI Classics. The album also consists of Lord's another composition Disguises, a suite in three movements, each a portrait of someone who inspired the composer.

The title was a quotation from a work by D. H. Lawrence.

== CD track listing ==
- Boom of the Tingling Strings
1. "Adagio assai" (8.52)
2. "L'istesso tempo" (6.22)
3. "Adagio" (7.26)
4. "Allegro giusto" (13.55)
- Disguises
1. "M.A.s.q.u.e. Poco adagio - Allegro moderato e poco pesante" (14.23)
2. "Music for Miriam. Adagio" (10.17)
3. "Il Buffone (G.C.). Allegro vivace" (10.58)

Total running time: 72.14

== Performers ==
- Nelson Goerner - piano
- Odense Symfoniorkester conducted by Paul Mann

== Production notes ==
- Recorded December 11–15, 2006, Carl Nielsen Hall, Odense, Denmark
- Producer and editor: Jorn Pedersen
- Balance engineer: Geoff Miles
