= To Notice Such Things =

Studio album by Jon Lord
- Released: 29 March 2010
- Label: Avie
- Producer: John Fraser

Jon Lord chronology
Beyond the Notes (2004)	To Notice Such Things (2010)

To Notice Such Things is a studio album by former Deep Purple keyboard player Jon Lord, commissioned and premiered with the composer by Shipley Arts Festival ( Artistic Director Andrew Bernardi ) in 2009 and later released through Avie in 2010. It is titled after the main work, a six-movement suite for solo flute, piano and string orchestra, composed by Lord in memory of his close friend the late Sir John Mortimer, CBE, QC. The music emanates from that which Lord composed for the stage show, Mortimer's Miscellany, which he also occasionally accompanied. To Notice Such Things is the last line of the Thomas Hardy poem "Afterwards", which ended the show.

Jon says of the piece, "I wanted to give the flute the job of speaking for John throughout the Suite; his laughter and his sighs, his wistfulness and occasional mild cantankerousness, his playfulness, and also the anguish and then the acceptance of his final days." The flute solo in the recording of To Notice Such Things, is performed by the Royal Liverpool Philharmonic Orchestra’s principal flautist Cormac Henry, who throughout the work engages in dexterous musical dialogue with Lord’s solo piano.

Jon Lord performed three movements from To Notice Such Things at Mortimer’s memorial service at Southwark Cathedral with Bernardi Music Group in November 2009, in front of an audience that included the Duchess of Cornwall, members of the Mortimer family, Peter Mandelson, Neil Kinnock, Jeremy Paxman, Alan Rickman, Peter O’Toole, Sir Tom Stoppard and Jeremy Irons, whose noble reading of "Afterwards" closes the recording of To Notice Such Things.

To Notice Such Things has been performed live several times, most notably on 16 June 2010 at Liverpool's Philharmonic Hall with Royal Liverpool Philharmonic Orchestra conducted by Clark Rundell.

== Track listing ==
1. "As I Walked Out One Evening" (4:15)
2. "At Court" (5:33)
3. "Turville Heath" (3:01)
4. "The Stick Dance" (4:45)
5. "The Winter of a Dormouse" (5:33)
6. "Afterwards" (3:56)
7. "Evening Song" (8:16)
8. "For Example" (9:12)
9. "Air on the Blue String" (6:33)
10. "Afterwards" (Poem by Thomas Hardy) (3:01)
- Tracks 1–6: To Notice Such Things - In memoriam of Sir John Mortimer, CBE, QC (1923–2009)
- Track 7: Original vocal version appears on Jon Lord's Pictured Within album
- Track 8: Dedicated to Øyvind Gimse and The Trondheim Soloists
- Track 9: Dedicated to Matthew Barley
- Track 10: Read by Jeremy Irons w/Jon Lord, piano

Total time: 54:25

Premiered and recorded live by Bernardi Music Group with the composer and flautist Bruce Martin on 5 July 2009 in Nuthurst.

Later recorded by Royal Liverpool Philharmonic Orchestra, Clark Rundell (conductor), Cormac Henry (flute on tracks 1–6), Jon Lord (piano), Thelma Handy (leader).

Recorded 30 September – 1 October 2009, The Friary, Liverpool. Producer: John Fraser. Engineer: Phil Hobbs.

Release date: 29 March 2010. Avie Records AV 2190
