= Mischa Damev =

Bulgarian-Swiss orchestral conductor

Mischa Damev (born 1963 in Sofia) is a Bulgarian-Swiss orchestral conductor.

He received his first musical training from his grandfather, the Bulgarian conductor Mihail Lefterov. When he was 10, his family moved from Bulgaria to Switzerland, where he studied piano at the Hochschule für Musik in Basel. He then studied with Alexis Weissenberg in Paris and Nikita Magaloff in Geneva.

On the advice of Mariss Jansons, he gave up his career as a concert pianist to become a conductor. He has had a highly successful international career, debuting with the Bulgarian National Radio Symphony Orchestra and spending some time as an assistant to Georges Prêtre and Vladimir Fedoseyev.

From 1990 to 1999, he was the first artistic director of the Orpheum Foundation for the Advancement of Young Soloists in Zurich. From 1992 to 2007, he was director of the Lilienberg Foundation piano festival. Since 2000, he has been a trustee of the International Master Prize Competition for Contemporary Symphonic Music in London. Since 2007, he has been director of the Kulturprozent-Classics program of the Swiss retail company Migros.

In addition to his promotion of young artists, he maintains a busy conducting schedule in Russia and Eastern Europe, Western Europe, and China. He has also collaborated with John Lord of the rock band Deep Purple.

== See also ==
- Orpheum official website
- Biography on Balletandopera.com
