= Nazareth discography =

Catalouging of published recordings by Scottish rock band

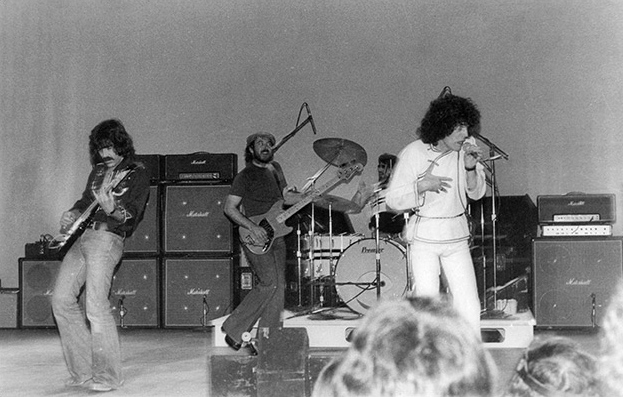
- Nazareth performing in 1976
- Studio albums: 25
- Extended plays: 2
- Live albums: 8
- Compilation albums: 7

This article contains a comprehensive collection of information related to recordings by the Scottish hard rock band, Nazareth.

== Studio albums ==
Title	Album details	Peak chart positions									Certifications
Title	Album details	CAN	US	AUT	GER	NOR	SWE	SWI	UK	UK Rock	Certifications
Nazareth	Released: 4 November 1971; Label: Pegasus	—	—	—	—	—	—	—	—	—	
Exercises	Released: July 1972; Label: Pegasus	—	—	—	—	—	—	—	—	—	
Razamanaz	Released: May 1973; Label: Mooncrest	39	157	—	48	—	—	—	11	—	CAN: Platinum
Loud 'n' Proud	Released: November 1973; Label: Mooncrest	17	150	1	8	9	—	—	10	—	CAN: Platinum; SWE: Gold
Rampant	Released: 26 April 1974; Label: Mooncrest	80	157	1	11	3	—	—	13	—	CAN: Gold
Hair of the Dog	Released: April 1975; Label: Mooncrest	20	17	7	27	5	—	—	—	—	CAN: Gold; US: Platinum
Close Enough for Rock 'n' Roll	Released: March 1976; Label: A&M	12	24	—	42	—	9	—	—	—	CAN: Gold
Play 'n' the Game	Released: November 1976; Label: A&M	14	75	—	—	—	14	—	—	—	CAN: Gold
Expect No Mercy	Released: November 1977; Label: A&M	78	82	—	—	—	—	—	—	—	CAN: Gold
No Mean City	Released: January 1979; Label: A&M	81	88	—	—	20	33	—	34	—	CAN: Gold
Malice in Wonderland	Released: January 1980; Label: A&M	19	41	—	43	9	—	—	—	—	CAN: Gold
The Fool Circle	Released: 6 February 1981; Label: NEMS	31	70	—	—	29	33	—	60	—	CAN: Gold
2XS	Released: June 1982; Label: Vertigo	74	122	—	42	9	—	—	—	—	
Sound Elixir	Released: June 1983; Label: Vertigo	—	—	—	52	8	—	—	—	—	
The Catch	Released: September 1984; Label: Vertigo	—	—	—	60	12	—	—	—	—	
Cinema	Released: February 1986; Label: Vertigo	—	—	—	—	18	—	—	—	—	
Snakes 'n' Ladders	Released: June 1989; Label: Vertigo	—	—	—	—	10	—	26	—	—	
No Jive	Released: 1 November 1991; Label: Mausoleum	—	—	31	—	—	—	36	—	—	
Move Me	Released: 17 October 1994; Label: Polydor	—	—	—	—	—	—	36	—	—	
Boogaloo	Released: 25 August 1998; Label: SPV GmbH	—	—	—	—	—	—	—	—	—	
The Newz	Released: 31 March 2008; Label: Edel	—	—	75	—	—	51	68	—	—	
Big Dogz	Released: 15 April 2011; Label: Edel	—	—	55	73	—	—	70	—	24	
Rock 'n' Roll Telephone	Released: 3 June 2014; Label: Edel	—	—	35	39	37	58	31	—	13	
Tattooed on My Brain	Released: 12 October 2018; Label: Frontiers	—	—	39	80	—	—	28	—	3	
Surviving the Law	Released: 15 April 2022; Label: Frontiers	—	—	68	—	—	—	10	—	7	
"—" denotes releases that did not chart or were not released in that territory.

== Live albums ==
Year	Album	Peak chart positions	
Year	Album	UK	US
1981	'Snaz	78	83
1991	BBC Radio 1 Live in Concert	—	—
1998	Live at the Beeb	—	—
2001	Back to the Trenches	—	—
2002	Homecoming	—	—
2002	Alive & Kicking	—	—
2004	The River Sessions Live 1981	—	—
2007	Live in Brazil	—	—
"—" denotes releases that did not chart or were not released in that territory.

== Compilation albums ==
Year	Album	Peak chart positions							Certifications
Year	Album	UK	US	CAN	AUS	GER	NOR	SWI	Certifications
1975	Greatest Hits	54	—	1	72	37	7	—	CAN: 2 X Platinum; GER: Gold; SWI: Gold; UK: Silver
1976	Hot Tracks	—	120	—	—	—	—	—	—
1984	The Very, Very Best of Nazareth	—	—	—	—	—	—	—	—
1985	The Ballad Album	—	—	—	—	—	5	—	Norway: Platinum; SWI: Gold
1990	The Ballad Album Vol.2	—	—	—	—	—	12	—	—
1990	The Singles Collection	—	—	—	—	—	—	—	—
1993	From the Vaults	—	—	—	—	—	—	—	—
1998	Greatest Hits Volume II	—	—	—	—	—	—	—	—
2001	The Very Best of Nazareth	—	—	—	—	—	23	—	—
2002	The Ballads	—	—	—	—	—	—	—	—
2004	Maximum XS: The Essential Nazareth	—	—	—	—	—	—	—	—
2004	Golden Hits Nazareth	—	—	—	—	—	—	—	—
2009	The Anthology	—	—	—	—	—	—	—	—
2012	The Singles	—	—	—	—	—	—	—	—
2020	The Ultimate Collection	93	—	—	—	—	—	—	—
"—" denotes releases that did not chart or were not released in that territory.

== Singles ==
This list includes only singles released in European and North American markets

Year	Single	Peak chart positions							Certification	Album
Year	Single	UK	US	CAN	SA	AUS	NLD	GER	Certification	Album
1972	"Dear John"	—	—	—	—	—	—	—		Nazareth
1972	"Morning Dew"	—	—	—	—	—	—	—		Nazareth
1972	"If You See My Baby"	—	—	—	—	—	—	—		non-album single
1972	"Hard Living"	—	—	—	—	—	—	—		non-album single
1973	"Broken Down Angel"	9	—	—	—	57	—	—		Razamanaz
1973	"Bad Bad Boy"	10	—	—	—	—	—	—		Razamanaz
1973	"Razamanaz"	—	117 (Note: These positions are from the Record World singles chart.)	—	—	—	—	—		Razamanaz
1973	"This Flight Tonight"	11	117	27	—	—	—	1		Loud 'n' Proud
1973	"Go Down Fighting"	—	—	—	—	—	—	—		Loud 'n' Proud
1974	"Shanghai'd in Shanghai"	41	—	—	—	—	—	14		Rampant
1974	"Glad When You're Gone"	—	—	—	—	—	—	—		Rampant
1974	"Love Hurts" (Note: UK peak in September 1977.)	41	8	1	1	8	1	30	US: Gold	Hair of the Dog
1975	"Hair of the Dog"	—	—	—	—	—	—	44		Hair of the Dog
1975	"My White Bicycle"	14	—	—	—	—	—	36		Greatest Hits
1975	"Holy Roller"	36	—	—	—	70	—	37		Greatest Hits
1976	"Carry Out Feelings"	—	—	79	—	—	—	—		Close Enough for Rock 'n' Roll
1976	"You're the Violin"	—	—	—	—	—	—	—		Close Enough for Rock 'n' Roll
1976	"Loretta"	—	—	84	—	—	—	—		Close Enough for Rock 'n' Roll
1976	"I Don't Want to Go On Without You"	—	—	—	13	—	—	—		Play 'n' the Game
1977	"I Want To (Do Everything For You)"	—	—	—	—	—	—	—		Play 'n' the Game
1977	"Somebody To Roll"	—	—	—	—	—	—	—		Play 'n' the Game
1977	Hot Tracks (EP)	15	—	—	—	—	—	—		Hot Tracks
1978	"Gone Dead Train"	49	—	—	—	—	—	—		Expect No Mercy
1978	"Shot Me Down"	—	113	—	—	—	—	—		Expect No Mercy
1978	"Place in Your Heart"	70	—	—	3	—	—	—		Expect No Mercy
1979	"May the Sunshine"	22	—	—	—	—	—	—		No Mean City
1979	"Whatever You Want Babe"	—	—	—	—	—	—	—		No Mean City
1979	"Star"	54	—	—	—	—	—	—		No Mean City
1980	"Holiday"	—	87	21	—	—	—	—		Malice in Wonderland
1980	"Heart's Grown Cold"	—	—	—	—	—	—	—		Malice in Wonderland
1980	"Big Boy"	—	—	—	—	—	—	—		Malice in Wonderland
1980	Nazareth Live (EP)	—	—	—	—	—	—	—		non-album single
1981	"Victoria"	—	—	—	—	—	—	—		The Fool Circle
1981	"Every Young Man's Dream"	—	—	—	—	—	—	—		The Fool Circle
1981	"Let Me Be Your Leader"	—	—	—	—	—	—	—		The Fool Circle
1981	"Morning Dew / Juicy Lucy"	—	—	—	—	—	—	—		'Snaz
1982	"Love Leads to Madness"	—	105	44	3	—	—	—		2XS
1982	"Dream On"	—	—	—	—	—	—	15		2XS
1983	"Games"	—	—	—	—	—	—	—		2XS
1983	"Where Are You Now"	—	—	—	—	—	—	—		Sound Elixir
1983	"Rags to Riches"	—	—	—	—	—	—	—		Sound Elixir
1984	"Party Down"	—	—	—	—	—	—	—		The Catch
1984	"Ruby Tuesday"	—	—	—	—	—	—	—		The Catch
1986	"Cinema"	—	—	—	—	—	—	—		Cinema
1989	"Piece of My Heart"	—	—	—	—	—	—	—		Snakes 'n' Ladders
1989	"Winner on the Night"	—	—	—	—	—	—	—		non-album single
1991	"Every Time It Rains"	—	—	—	—	—	—	—		No Jive
1992	"Tell Me That You Love Me"	—	—	—	—	—	—	—		No Jive
1994	"Move Me"	—	—	—	—	—	—	—		Move Me
1994	"Love Hurts" (with Munich Philharmonic Orchestra)	—	—	—	—	—	—	89		Non-album single
"—" denotes releases that did not chart or were not released in that territory.

== Videos ==
- Live in Texas (1981)
- Razamanaz — Live from London (1985)
- Homecoming — Greatest Hits Live in Glasgow (2002)
- From the Beginning (2005)
- Live from Classic T Stage (2005)
- Naza' Live Scottish TV 1980 (2005)
- Live in Brazil (2007)
- No Means of Escape (2015)

== Music videos ==
List of music videos
Title	Year
"Razamanaz"	1973
"Vigilante"	1973
"This Flight Tonight"	1973
"Love Hurts"	1974
"Hair of the Dog"	1975
"Miss Misery"	1975
"Holy Roller"	1975
"I Don't Want to Go on Without You"	1976
"Shot Me Down"	1977
"Expect No Mercy"	1977
"Gone Dead Train"	1978
"Place in Your Heart"	1978
"May the Sunshine"	1979
"Whatever You Want Babe"	1979
"Star"	1979
"Holiday"	1980
"Heart's Grown Cold"	1980
"Little Part of You"	1981
"Moonlight Eyes"	1981
"Let Me Be Your Leader"	1981
"Love Leads to Madness"	1982
"Dream On"	1982
"Where Are You Now"	1983
"Rain on the Window"	1983
"Party Down"	1984
"Animals"	1989
"Piece of My Heart"	1989
"Hang on to a Dream"	1989
"Every Time It Rains"	1991
"Move Me"	1994
"Talk Talk"	1998
"See Me"	2010
"God of the Mountain"	2012
"Tattooed on My Brain"	2018
"Strange Days"	2022

== Lyric videos ==
List of Lyric videos
Title	Year
"Runaway"	2022
