= 'Snaz =

Live album by Nazareth
- Released: September 1981
- Recorded: 23 May 1981
- Venue: Pacific Coliseum (Vancouver)
- Genre: Hard rock
- Length: 95:15 (original vinyl release and 2001 CD edition)
- Label: A&M
- Producer: John Punter

Nazareth chronology
The Fool Circle (1981)	'Snaz (1981)	2XS (1982)

Professional ratings
Review scores
Source	Rating
AllMusic	4/5 stars
Record Mirror	4/5 stars

'Snaz is a double live album by the Scottish hard rock band Nazareth, released in September 1981.

The title is rendered on the album artwork in all-capital letters, and when the gatefold-sleeve is opened, the title appears as "IT'SNAZ", but only "'SNAZ" is seen on the front cover when closed. AllMusic uses the shorter title without the apostrophe, as "Snaz", while Discogs includes the apostrophe, showing "'Snaz", and the Official Charts Company identified it as "Nazareth Live".

The album was recorded at the Pacific Coliseum in Vancouver, Canada, in May 1981 during the band's 1981 North American tour. The band recorded several of the dates on the tour but felt this one show was fine in its entirety. The album was mixed at The Manor, Oxfordshire.

The original LP featured two bonus studio tracks, "Juicy Lucy" and a re-recording of "Morning Dew". Together with "Crazy (A Suitable Case for Treatment)", from the Heavy Metal soundtrack, these were the first studio recordings of the new 6-piece line-up. In Germany, the LP originally came with a free bonus 1-sided 7", a remix of "Morning Dew" with the vocals sung in German, and thus titled "Morgentau". This was never issued separately, although it is sometimes (incorrectly) listed as a promo single.

Due to time-constraints, the original 1987 single-CD release dropped five tracks from the original vinyl ("Every Young Man's Dream", "Big Boy", "Let Me Be Your Leader" and the two studio cuts). The 1997 remaster by Rob Corich, on the Castle Communications / Essential label, again did not include all tracks, as the label did not consider a 2-CD set to be financially viable. However, it did restore "Let Me Be Your Leader", whilst the remaining four absent tracks were included on the 1998 reissue of The Fool Circle.

Eagle Records acquired the Nazareth back catalogue at the turn of the century, and set about reissues. In 2001 'Snaz was finally transferred to CD in its entirety, being a "30th Anniversary Edition" 2CD release, including all live tracks in the correct running-order, plus the two studio tracks that finish side D of the original vinyl. A sticker on the front drew attention to the fact, reading "Original complete double album available for the first time on CD. Digitally remastered."

In 2011 Salvo Records re-released the album with additional material from a Seattle concert together with "Crazy (A Suitable Case for Treatment)" and the German version of "Morning Dew" (titled Morgentau). Salvo's CD 1 comprises sides 1–3 of the original vinyl (tracks 1–15), while CD 2 consists of side 4 of the original vinyl, expanded with bonus tracks.

== Reception ==
In 2005, 'Snaz was ranked number 430 in Rock Hard magazine's book The 500 Greatest Rock & Metal Albums of All Time.

== Track listing ==
=== Side 1 ===
No.	Title	Writer(s)	Original album	Length
1.	"Telegram: On Your Way/ So You Want to Be a Rock 'n' Roll Star/ Sound Check"	Chris Hillman, Roger McGuinn/Agnew, Charlton, McCafferty, Sweet	Close Enough for Rock 'n' Roll (1976)	6:33
2.	"Razamanaz"	Manny Charlton, Dan McCafferty, Pete Agnew, Darrell Sweet	Razamanaz (1973)	4:23
3.	"I Want To (Do Everything for You)" (Joe Tex cover)	Joe Tex	Play 'n' the Game (1976)	5:16
4.	"This Flight Tonight" (Joni Mitchell cover)	Joni Mitchell	Loud 'N' Proud (1973)	3:46
5.	"Beggars Day" (Grin cover)	Nils Lofgren	Hair of the Dog (1975)	3:37

=== Side 2 ===
No.	Title	Writer(s)	Original album	Length
1.	"Every Young Man's Dream"	Sweet	The Fool Circle (1981)	3:54
2.	"Heart's Grown Cold"	Zal Cleminson	Malice in Wonderland (1980)	5:51
3.	"Java Blues" (Rick Danko cover)	Emmett Grogan, Rick Danko		5:06
4.	"Cocaine" (J.J. Cale cover)	J.J. Cale	The Fool Circle (1981)	5:04
5.	"Big Boy"	Cleminson	Malice in Wonderland (1980)	5:19

=== Side 3 ===
No.	Title	Writer(s)	Original album	Length
1.	"Holiday"	Manny Charlton, Dan McCafferty, Pete Agnew, Darrell Sweet	Malice in Wonderland (1980)	3:40
2.	"Dressed to Kill"	Manny Charlton, Dan McCafferty, Pete Agnew, Darrell Sweet	The Fool Circle (1981)	3:55
3.	"Hair of the Dog"	Manny Charlton, Dan McCafferty, Pete Agnew, Darrell Sweet	Hair of the Dog (1975)	6:07
4.	"Expect No Mercy"	Manny Charlton, Dan McCafferty, Pete Agnew, Darrell Sweet	Expect No Mercy (1977)	4:37
5.	"Shapes of Things" (The Yardbirds cover)	Jim McCarty, Keith Relf, Paul Samwell-Smith	Rampant (1974)	6:22

=== Side 4 ===
No.	Title	Writer(s)	Original album	Length
1.	"Let Me Be Your Leader"	Charlton	The Fool Circle (1981)	4:44
2.	"Love Hurts" (The Everly Brothers cover)	Boudleaux Bryant	Hair of the Dog (1975)	3:59
3.	"Tush" (ZZ Top cover)	Frank Beard, Billy Gibbons, Dusty Hill		4:55
4.	"Juicy Lucy (Studio Track)"	Manny Charlton, Dan McCafferty, Pete Agnew, Darrell Sweet	studio	4:17
5.	"Morning Dew (1981 Studio Version)" (Bonnie Dobson cover)	Bonnie Dobson, Tim Rose	studio	3:55

=== 2011 Salvo Disc 2 bonus tracks ===
No.	Title	Writer(s)	Length
6.	"Java Blues" (live in Seattle)	Emmett Grogan, Rick Danko	4:13
7.	"Cocaine" (live in Seattle)	J.J. Cale	5:09
8.	"Big Boy" (live in Seattle)	Zal Cleminson	5:04
9.	"Holiday" (live in Seattle)	Manny Charlton, Dan McCafferty, Pete Agnew, Darrell Sweet	3:34
10.	"Let Me Be Your Leader" (live in Seattle)	Manny Charlton	4:34
11.	"Dressed to Kill" (live in Seattle)	Manny Charlton, Dan McCafferty, Pete Agnew, Darrell Sweet	3:47
12.	"Hair of the Dog" (live in Seattle)	Manny Charlton, Dan McCafferty, Pete Agnew, Darrell Sweet	5:48
13.	"Morgentau" (German version of Morning Dew)	Bonnie Dobson, Tim Rose	4:01
14.	"Crazy (A Suitable Case for Treatment)" (from Heavy Metal soundtrack)	Manny Charlton, Dan McCafferty, Pete Agnew, Darrell Sweet	3:26

- Disc 1 of the 2011 Salvo Remaster includes Sides 1–3 of the original vinyl release. Disc 2 includes Side 4 plus the 9 bonus tracks listed above.
- Morgentau and Crazy (A Suitable Case for Treatment) are also available on Salvo reissue of The Fool Circle album; Morgentau is also available on the 30th anniversary edition of The Fool Circle album.

== Personnel ==
Nazareth

- Dan McCafferty – vocals
- Manny Charlton – guitar
- Billy Rankin – guitar, backing vocals
- John Locke – keyboards
- Pete Agnew – bass guitar, backing vocals
- Darrell Sweet – drums, backing vocals

== Charts ==
Chart (1981)	Peak position
UK Albums (Official Charts)	78
US Billboard 200	83
