= Greatest Hits (Nazareth album) =

Compilation album by Nazareth
- Released: 21 November 1975
- Recorded: 1972–1975
- Genre: Hard rock
- Length: 44:05
- Labels: Vertigo (Europe); A&M (US)
- Producer: Roger Glover

Nazareth chronology
Hair of the Dog (1975)	Greatest Hits (1975)	Close Enough for Rock 'n' Roll (1976)

Professional ratings
Review scores
Source	Rating
Allmusic	3/5 stars

Greatest Hits is a compilation album by the Scottish hard rock band Nazareth, released in 1975. By this time Nazareth had experienced considerable success with albums and singles. This compilation showcased tracks from the band's third album Razamanaz through their sixth album Hair of the Dog, as well as some non-album singles.

As part of the remastering of Nazareth's back-catalogue by Castle Communications in the mid-1990s, the original album was expanded in 1996 to encompass the self-titled first album through to the ninth studio offering, Expect No Mercy, whilst retaining the original running-order of the vinyl release.

As part of the same CD-remastering programme, Greatest Hits Volume II was released in 1998, on CD only. This covered the later period of the band.

== Track listing ==
All lyrics are written by Manny Charlton, Dan McCafferty, Pete Agnew, Darrell Sweet unless otherwise noted.

Greatest Hits track listing
No.	Title	Writer(s)	Length
1.	"Razamanaz"		3:53
2.	"Holy Roller"		3:25
3.	"Shanghai'd in Shanghai"		3:45
4.	"Love Hurts" (The Everly Brothers cover)	Boudleaux Bryant	3:54
5.	"Turn On Your Receiver"		3:21
6.	"Bad Bad Boy"		3:58
7.	"This Flight Tonight" (Joni Mitchell cover)	Joni Mitchell	3:25
8.	"Broken Down Angel"		3:46
9.	"Hair of the Dog"		3:17
10.	"Sunshine"		3:45
11.	"My White Bicycle" (Tomorrow cover)	Keith Hopkins, Ken Burgess	3:28
12.	"Woke Up This Morning"		3:45

1989 Vertigo CD bonus tracks
No.	Title	Writer(s)	Length
13.	"Expect No Mercy"		3:27
14.	"Dream On"		3:28
15.	"Where Are You Now"	Pete Agnew, Manny Charlton, Dan McCafferty, Darrell Sweet, Billy Rankin	3:55

1996 Castle CD bonus tracks
No.	Title	Writer(s)	Length
13.	"Morning Dew" (Bonnie Dobson cover; original version)	Bonnie Dobson, Tim Rose	3:45
14.	"Love Now You're Gone"		2:25
15.	"Carry Out Feelings"		3:18
16.	"I Want To (Do Everything For You)" (Joe Tex cover)	Joe Tex	4:18
17.	"Expect No Mercy"		3:26

- The 1996 remastered CD (Castle Communications ESMCD 369) added five bonus tracks listed above) and extensive booklet-notes, by Rob Corich (who did the remastering) and by McCafferty, Agnew and Sweet.

2010 Salvo CD bonus tracks
No.	Title	Writer(s)	Length
13.	"Expect No Mercy"		3:27
14.	"Telegram" "Part 1: On Your Way" "Part 2: So You Wanna Be a Rock 'n' Roll Star" (The Byrds cover) "Part 3: Sound Check" "Part 4: Here We Are Again"	Roger McGuinn, Chris Hillman	7:48
15.	"Just to Get Into It"		4:22
16.	"Teenage Nervous Breakdown" (Little Feat cover)	Lowell George	3:43
17.	"Morning Dew" (single; Bonnie Dobson cover)	Bonnie Dobson, Tim Rose	3:54
18.	"Go Down Fighting"		3:05
19.	"Dream On"		3:26
20.	"Every Time It Rains"	Billy Rankin	4:11

- The album was re-issued on CD in the UK again by Salvo Records in 2010. Again, the original running order was preserved with additional tracks added afterward to make the album a more comprehensive overview of the band's career. Two of these eight bonus tracks are from significantly later in the band's career, with "Dream On" coming from 1982's 2XS, and "Every Time It Rains" from 1991's No Jive.

== Personnel ==
- Dan McCafferty – vocals 1 2 3 4 5 6 7 8 9 10 11 12 13 14 15 16 17 18 19 20
- Darrell Sweet – drums 1 2 3 4 5 6 7 8 9 10 11 12 13 14 15 16 17 18 19 20
- Manny Charlton – guitar 1 2 3 4 5 6 7 8 9 10 11 12 13 14 15 16 17 18 19 20
- Pete Agnew – bass guitar, guitar 1 2 3 4 5 6 7 8 9 10 11 12 13 14 15 16 17 18 19 20
- Roger Glover – producer 1 2 3 4 5 6 7 8 9 10 11 12 13 14 15 16 17 18 19 20
- Pete York - tambourine 4

== Charts ==
=== Weekly charts ===
Chart (1975–76)	Peak position
Australian Albums (Kent Music Report)	72
Canada Top Albums/CDs (RPM)	1
Dutch Albums (Album Top 100)	2
German Albums (Offizielle Top 100)	37
New Zealand Albums (RMNZ)	21
Norwegian Albums (VG-lista)	7
Swedish Albums (Sverigetopplistan)	31
UK Albums (Official Charts)	54

=== Year-end charts ===
Chart (1976)	Position
Canada Top Albums/CDs (RPM)	9

Chart (2002)	Position
Canadian Metal Albums (Nielsen SoundScan)	81

== Certifications ==
Region	Certification	Certified units/sales
Canada (Music Canada)	2× Platinum	200,000^{^}
Germany (BVMI)	Gold	250,000^{^}
Switzerland (IFPI Switzerland)	Gold	25,000^{^}
United Kingdom (BPI)	Silver	60,000^{^}
^{^} Shipments figures based on certification alone.
