= Back to the Trenches =

Live album by Nazareth
- Released: 22 May 2001
- Genre: Hard rock
- Length: 144:41
- Label: Receiver
- Producer: Nazareth

Nazareth chronology
Live at the Beeb (1998)	Back to the Trenches (2001)	Homecoming (2002)

Professional ratings
Review scores
Source	Rating
Allmusic	3.5/5 stars

Back to the Trenches is a double live album by the Scottish hard rock band Nazareth, released in 2001. A collection of thirty-one live tracks taken from the soundboards of six concerts, on both sides of the Atlantic, between 1972 and 1984, only nine of these tunes are featured on the band's acclaimed 1981 double live album 'Snaz. A line on the CD sleeve says, "This brings you Nazareth in their element - up there doing it".

The CD comes with a 52-page booklet containing old photos and interviews with Pete Agnew and Dan McCafferty. It also was issued on vinyl.

Pete Frame of Rock Family Trees fame was commissioned to draw up a Nazareth family tree based on info taken from an interview.

== Disc one ==
- Tracks 1–10 Paris Theatre, London 1972 (same tracks as on BBC Radio 1 Live in Concert album
- Tracks 11–14 Hammersmith Odeon 1980

== Disc two ==
- Tracks 1–4 Glasgow Apollo 1981
- Tracks 5–11 Fort Pierce 1982
- Tracks 12–14 Vancouver 1983
- Tracks 15–17 Slough 1984

== CD1 track listing ==
All lyrics are written by Manny Charlton, Dan McCafferty, Pete Agnew, Darrell Sweet except indicated.

No.	Title	Writer(s)	Length
1.	"Morning Dew"	Bonnie Dobson, Tim Rose	7:05
2.	"Alcatraz"	Leon Russell	3:52
3.	"Vigilante Man"	Gwen Guthrie, Woody Guthrie	5:12
4.	"Razamanaz"		4:04
5.	"Night Woman"		3:26
6.	"Broken Down Angel"		4:00
7.	"Country Girl"		4:18
8.	"Woke Up This Morning"		4:40
9.	"Called Her Name"		4:18
10.	"Black Hearted Woman"	Gregg Allman	9:41
11.	"Talkin' to One of the Boys"		4:48
12.	"Broken Down Angel"		4:45
13.	"Heart's Grown Cold"	Zal Cleminson	5:40
14.	"Showdown at the Border"	Zal Cleminson	4:09

== CD2 track listing ==
All lyrics are written by Manny Charlton, Dan McCafferty, Pete Agnew, Darrell Sweet except indicated.

No.	Title	Writer(s)	Length
1.	"Hair of the Dog"		5:51
2.	"Expect No Mercy"		4:23
3.	"Love Hurts"	Boudleaux Bryant	4:06
4.	"Shapes of Things"	Jim McCarty, Keith Relf, Paul Samwell-Smith	5:47
5.	"Boys in the Band"		3:11
6.	"Beggars Day"	Nils Lofgren	3:34
7.	"This Flight Tonight"	Joni Mitchell	3:55
8.	"Love Leads to Madness"	McCafferty, Sweet, Charlton, Agnew, Rankin	4:12
9.	"Gatecrash"	McCafferty, Sweet, Charlton, Agnew, Rankin	3:18
10.	"Preservation"		4:19
11.	"Back to the Trenches"		4:16
12.	"All Night Radio"	McCafferty, Sweet, Charlton, Agnew, Rankin	5:26
13.	"Razamanaz"		4:28
14.	"Whippin' Boy"	McCafferty, Sweet, Charlton, Agnew, Rankin	4:24
15.	"Ruby Tuesday"	Keith Richards, Mick Jagger	3:44
16.	"Telegram, Pts. 1-3"		5:50
17.	"This Month's Messiah"		4:59

== Personnel ==
- Dan McCafferty – lead vocals (all tracks), bagpipes in "Hair of the Dog"
- Manny Charlton – guitars (all tracks)
- Billy Rankin – guitars (1981–1983 dates)
- Zal Cleminson – guitars (1980 dates)
- Pete Agnew – bass guitar, backing vocals (all tracks)
- John Locke – keyboards (1981–1982 dates)
- Darrell Sweet – drums (all tracks)
