= Bad Bad Boy =

Single by Nazareth

from the album Razamanaz
- B-side: "Hard Living"; "Spinning Top"
- Released: July 1973
- Genre: Hard rock; blues rock
- Label: Mooncrest
- Songwriters: Dan McCafferty; Darrell Sweet; Pete Agnew; Manny Charlton
- Producer: Roger Glover

Nazareth singles chronology
"Broken Down Angel" (1973)	"Bad Bad Boy" (1973)	"This Flight Tonight" (1973)

"Bad Bad Boy" is a song and single by Scottish rock group Nazareth. It was first released in 1973.

== Background and chart success ==
Musicians are Dan McCafferty on lead vocals, Darrell Sweet on percussion, Pete Agnew on bass guitar and Manny Charlton on electric guitar. The song came from their 1973 album Razamanaz. The song was the second of eleven of Nazareth's singles to appear in the UK Singles Chart. It reached number 10 in 1973, staying for nine weeks.

A 2010 re-issue of their 1973 album Loud 'n' Proud contained "Bad Bad Boy" as a bonus track not included on the original release. It was taken from a live recording from the Bob Harris show on BBC Radio.
