= Homecoming (Nazareth album) =

Live album by Nazareth
- Released: 23 April 2002
- Recorded: 2001
- Genre: Hard rock
- Length: 72:00
- Label: Eagle
- Producer: Dan Priest

Nazareth chronology
Back to the Trenches (2001)	Homecoming (2002)	Alive & Kicking (2003)

Professional ratings
Review scores
Source	Rating
Allmusic	2.5/5 stars

Homecoming is the second official live album by the Scottish hard rock band Nazareth, released in 2002. Recorded in Glasgow, Scotland in 2001, it may be regarded as the soundtrack to the DVD of the same name, with stage talk edited to allow the tracks to fit onto a single CD.

The CD tray insert states "The Greatest Hits Live In Glasgow".

== Track listing ==
All tracks are written by Manny Charlton, Dan McCafferty, Pete Agnew, Darrell Sweet unless otherwise noted

No.	Title	Writer(s)	Length
1.	"When the Lights Come Down"	Billy Rankin, Dan McCafferty, Pete Agnew, Darrell Sweet, Ronnie Leahy	3:12
2.	"Razamanaz"		4:45
3.	"Miss Misery (interpolating "Please don't Judas Me")"		7:05
4.	"Holiday"		3:34
5.	"Dream On"		4:09
6.	"Simple Solution"	Zal Cleminson	4:26
7.	"My White Bicycle"	Ken Burgess, Keith Hopkins	3:16
8.	"Walk by Yourself"		4:37
9.	"Bad Bad Boy"		3:56
10.	"Heart's Grown Cold"	Zal Cleminson	5:09
11.	"Broken Down Angel"		4:40
12.	"Whiskey Drinkin Woman"		4:41
13.	"Hair of the Dog"		6:17
14.	"This Flight Tonight"	Joni Mitchell	3:38
15.	"Beggars Day"	Nils Lofgren	3:51
16.	"Love Hurts"	Boudleaux Bryant	4:37

== Personnel ==
- Dan McCafferty - lead vocals, bagpipe talk box in "Hair of the Dog"
- Jimmy Murrison - guitars, backing vocals in "Hair of the Dog"
- Pete Agnew - bass guitar, backing vocals
- Ronnie Leahy - keyboards
- Lee Agnew - drums
