= Live at the Beeb =

Live album by Nazareth
- Released: 1998
- Recorded: 13 January 1972 – 27 November 1975
- Genre: Hard rock
- Length: 119:38
- Label: Snapper
- Producer: Nazareth

Nazareth chronology
Greatest Hits Volume II (1998)	Live at the Beeb (1998)	Back to the Trenches (2001)

Live at the Beeb is a double live album by the Scottish hard rock band Nazareth, released in 1998.

It is a 2CD release compiled from the band's recordings for BBC Radio 1 and released by arrangement with BBC Worldwide Music.

== CD1 track listing ==
All lyrics are written by Manny Charlton, Dan McCafferty, Pete Agnew, Darrell Sweet unless otherwise noted.

No.	Title	Writer(s)	Length
1.	"Called Her Name"		4:09
2.	"Fool About You"		2:48
3.	"Hard Living"		2:59
4.	"Goin' Down"	Don Nix	4:01
5.	"Razamanaz"		4:15
6.	"Broken Down Angel"		4:02
7.	"Night Woman"		3:25
8.	"Too Bad Too Sad"		2:50
9.	"Turn On Your Receiver"		3:36
10.	"Bad Bad Boy"		3:34
11.	"Shapes of Things"	Jim McCarty Keith Relf Paul Samwell-Smith	6:17
12.	"Silver Dollar Forger"		5:35
13.	"Glad When You're Gone"		4:16
14.	"Jet Lag"		6:39

== CD2 track listing ==
All lyrics are written by Manny Charlton, Dan McCafferty, Pete Agnew, Darrell Sweet except indicated unless otherwise noted.

No.	Title	Writer(s)	Length
1.	"Dear John"		3:51
2.	"Morning Dew"	Bonnie Dobson Tim Rose	6:47
3.	"Vigilante Man"	Woody Guthrie	5:32
4.	"Paper Sun"	Jim Capaldi Steve Winwood	5:17
5.	"Woke Up This Morning/ Boogie"		9:45
6.	"Love Hurts"	Boudleaux Bryant	4:21
7.	"Expect No Mercy"		3:43
8.	"This Flight Tonight"	Joni Mitchell	3:41
9.	"Whiskey Drinking Woman/ Hair Of the Dog"		7:14
10.	"Teenage Nervous Breakdown"	Lowell George	3:40
11.	"Road Ladies"	Frank Zappa	7:04
