= BBC Radio 1 Live in Concert (Nazareth album) =

Live album by Nazareth
- Released: 1991
- Recorded: June 8, 1972 and May 17, 1973
- Venue: Paris Theatre, London
- Genre: Hard rock
- Length: 51:02
- Label: Windsong International
- Producer: Jeff Griffin

Nazareth chronology
Razamanaz (1973)	BBC Radio 1 Live in Concert (1991)	Loud 'n' Proud (1973)

Professional ratings
Review scores
Source	Rating
Allmusic	3/5 stars

BBC Radio 1 Live in Concert is a live album by the Scottish hard rock band Nazareth, recorded for broadcast by the BBC at the Paris Theatre 8 June 1972 (wrongly listed as 5 June on CD) and 17 May 1973

== Track listing ==
All lyrics are written by Manny Charlton, Dan McCafferty, Pete Agnew, Darrell Sweet unless otherwise noted.

No.	Title	Writer(s)	Length
1.	"Morning Dew"	Bonnie Dobson, Tim Rose	7:05
2.	"Alcatraz"	Leon Russell	3:53
3.	"Vigilante Man"	Woody Guthrie	5:12
4.	"Razamanaz"		4:04
5.	"Night Woman"		3:26
6.	"Broken Down Angel"		4:03
7.	"Country Girl*"		4:19
8.	"Woke up This Morning*"		4:40
9.	"Called Her Name*"		4:19
10.	"Black Hearted Woman*"	Gregg Allman	9:51

* 08.06.1972, Paris Theatre, London

== Personnel ==
Nazareth

- Pete Agnew - bass guitar, piano, backing vocals
- Manny Charlton - guitar, backing vocals
- Dan McCafferty - vocals
- Darrell Sweet - drums, percussion, backing vocals

Technical

- Alan Gardner - liner notes
- Jeff Griffin - producer
- Jo Murphy - coordination, compilation
