= Surviving the Law =

Studio album by Nazareth
- Released: 15 April 2022
- Studio: Sub Station (Rosyth, Scotland)
- Genre: Hard rock; heavy metal
- Label: Frontiers
- Producer: Yann Rouiller

Nazareth chronology
Tattooed on My Brain (2018)	Surviving the Law (2022)

Surviving the Law is the 25th studio album by Scottish hard rock band Nazareth. It was released on 15 April 2022 by Frontiers Records and produced by Yann Rouiller who also worked with Nazareth on their previous albums, Tattooed on My Brain (2018), The Newz (2008) and Rock 'n' Roll Telephone (2014). It is the second and last Nazareth album to feature vocalist Carl Sentance before his departure from the band in 2025. Original singer Dan McCafferty had given his blessings to Nazareth's new singer and left the band in 2014 citing health issues. McCafferty died on 08 November 2022.

== Reception ==
Professional ratings
Review scores
Source	Rating
Total Spill Rating	(7/10)

Aaron Badgley of The Spill Magazine compares this to Tattooed on My Brain, their prior album. "Surviving the Law has a rougher edge. Here the band is much less polished" and he continues, "It is heavy metal, and at times they are dipping their toes in grunge."

== Track listing ==
No.	Title	Writer(s)	Length
1.	"Strange Days"	Lee Agnew	3:23
2.	"You Gotta Pass It Around"	Jimmy Murrison	3:22
3.	"Runaway"	Carl Sentance	3:36
4.	"Better Leave It Out"	Jimmy Murrison	3:34
5.	"Mind Bomb"	Lee Agnew	3:31
6.	"Sweet Kiss"	Jimmy Murrison	3:38
7.	"Falling In Love"	Carl Sentance	3:52
8.	"Waiting For The World To End"	Jimmy Murrison	2:50
9.	"Let The Whisky Flow"	Lee Agnew	3:52
10.	"Sinner"	Lee Agnew	2:03
11.	"Ciggies & Booze"	Jimmy Murrison	3:31
12.	"Psycho Skies"	Carl Sentance	3:32
13.	"Love Breaks"	Lee Agnew	3:16
14.	"You Made Me"	Pete Agnew	5:14

== Personnel ==
Nazareth

- Carl Sentance – lead and backing vocals
- Pete Agnew – bass guitar, backing vocals
- Jimmy Murrison – guitars, backing vocals
- Lee Agnew – drums, percussion, backing vocals

Additional musicians

- Ronnie Leahy – Organ on "You Made Me"
- Suzy Cargill – Djembe on "Let the Whisky Flow"

== Charts ==
Chart (2022)	Peak position
Austrian Albums (Ö3 Austria)	68
Scottish Albums (OCC)	45
Swiss Albums (Schweizer Hitparade)	10
UK Independent Albums (OCC)	28
UK Rock & Metal Albums (OCC)	7
