= Razamanaz =

Studio album by Nazareth
- Released: May 1973
- Studio: The Ganghut, Jamestown, Scotland with Pye Mobile Unit
- Genre: Hard rock
- Length: 34:24
- Label: Mooncrest
- Producer: Roger Glover

Nazareth chronology
Exercises (1972)	Razamanaz (1973)	Loud 'n' Proud (1973)

Professional ratings
Review scores
Source	Rating
AllMusic	4/5 stars

Razamanaz is the third studio album by the Scottish hard rock band Nazareth, released in May 1973. It was the band's first LP record to break the charts and was produced by Roger Glover of Deep Purple, who the band was on tour with at the time. "Woke Up This Morning" was re-recorded for this album.

== Background ==
Following the relatively soft rock and folk-oriented styles of their first two albums, Nazareth (1971) and Exercises (1972), the band pursued stronger guitar riffs and a more straightforward hard rock sound with Razamanaz. The album's title track, "Razamanaz", is an energetic song with elements of glam rock that gained popularity in the UK rock scene and became a staple of the band's live performances.

Razamanaz reached number 11 on the UK Albums Chart, and the singles "Broken Down Angel" and "Bad Bad Boy" peaked at numbers 9 and 10 on the UK Singles Chart, respectively, achieving commercial success. The album's success helped increase Nazareth's international recognition and paved the way for the subsequent albums Loud 'n' Proud (1973), Rampant (1974), and Hair of the Dog (1975).

Roger Glover helped to bring out the band's musical potential through this album and continued to produce their following albums, including Loud 'n' Proud and Rampant.

== Track listing ==
All tracks are written by Pete Agnew, Manny Charlton, Dan McCafferty, Darrell Sweet unless otherwise noted.

Side one
No.	Title	Writer(s)	Length
1.	"Razamanaz"		3:52
2.	"Alcatraz"	Leon Russell	4:23
3.	"Vigilante Man"	Woody Guthrie	5:21
4.	"Woke Up This Morning"		3:53

Side two
No.	Title	Length
5.	"Night Woman"	3:29
6.	"Bad Bad Boy"	3:55
7.	"Sold My Soul"	4:49
8.	"Too Bad, Too Sad"	2:55
9.	"Broken Down Angel"	3:45

=== 1996 Castle Communications Bonus Tracks ===
No.	Title	Writer(s)	Length
10.	"Hard Living" (B-side to Bad Bad Boy single in the UK)		3:03
11.	"Spinning Top" (B-side to Bad Bad Boy single in the UK)		3:06
12.	"Woke Up This Morning" (original version from Exercises album)		3:13
13.	"Witchdoctor Woman" (B-side to Broken Down Angel single, originally released on Nazareth album)	Charlton, McCafferty	4:07

=== 2001 30th Anniversary Bonus Track ===
No.	Title	Length
12.	"Razamanaz" (alternate edit)	3:26

- This remastered CD added three bonus tracks and extensive liner-notes:
- The master tapes for tracks 10 and 11 could not be located and here were 'cleaned up' from vinyl.

=== 2010 Salvo Records Remaster Bonus Tracks ===
No.	Title	Writer(s)	Length
10.	"Hard Living" (B-Side of Bad Bad Boy)		3:03
11.	"Spinning Top" (B-Side of Bad Bad Boy)		3:06
12.	"Razamanaz" (BBC Session)		4:15
13.	"Night Woman" (BBC Session)		3:25
14.	"Broken Down Angel" (BBC Session)		4:02
15.	"Vigilante Man" (BBC Session)	Woody Guthrie	5:04

- BBC sessions were recorded at Maida Vale Studios for the Bob Harris Show on BBC Radio 1. Producer: Pete Rizkema. Engineer: Bill Aitken. First transmission date: 26 March 1973.

=== Covers ===
- "Razamanaz" was covered by US punk band The Meatmen on their 1985 album War of the Superbikes.
- "Razamanaz" was covered by Danish technical thrash metal band Artillery on their 1990 album By Inheritance.
- "Razamanaz" was also recorded by Quiet Riot vocalist Kevin DuBrow, it appears on In for the Kill, a 2004 covers album.
- "Razamanaz" was also recorded by the Supersuckers. It appears on the 1992 compilation album The Songs All Sound the Same, listed as "Razzmanazz".
- "Razamanaz" was covered by Norwegian metal band Artch on their 1991 album For the Sake of Mankind.
- "Razamanaz" was covered by Swedish heavy metal band Morgana Lefay on their 1993 album Knowing Just as I.
- "Razamanaz" was covered by English heavy metal band Saxon on their 2023 album More Inspirations.

== Personnel ==
Nazareth

- Dan McCafferty – lead vocals
- Darrell Sweet – drums, percussion, backing vocals, liner notes
- Pete Agnew – bass guitar, backing vocals
- Manny Charlton – electric and acoustic guitars, slide guitar, banjo, backing vocals

Technical

- Roger Glover – producer, percussions on some tracks
- Alan Perkins – recording engineer (Pye Mobile Recording Unit)
- Geoffrey Emerick – sound engineer (AIR)
- Patrick Watters, Fin Costello – photography
- Mike Brown – remastering
- Robert M. Corich – remastering, liner notes, recovery of bonus tracks
- Dave Field – design

== Charts ==
Chart (1973)	Peak position
Canada Top Albums/CDs (RPM)	39
Finnish Albums (The Official Finnish Charts)	4
German Albums (Offizielle Top 100)	48
UK Albums (OCC)	11
US Billboard 200	157

== Certifications ==
Region	Certification	Certified units/sales
Canada (Music Canada)	Platinum	100,000^{^}
^{^} Shipments figures based on certification alone.
