= Hair of the Dog (album) =

Studio album by Nazareth
- Released: April 1975
- Studios: Escape, Egerton, Kent; AIR, London
- Genres: Hard rock; heavy metal; blues rock
- Length: 40:34
- Label: Mooncrest
- Producer: Manny Charlton

Nazareth chronology
Rampant (1974)	Hair of the Dog (1975)	Greatest Hits (1975)

Singles from Hair of the Dog
- 1. "Love Hurts" Released: 8 November 1974; 2. "Hair of the Dog" Released: 14 March 1975

Music video
- "Hair of the Dog" on YouTube

Music video
- "Love Hurts" on YouTube

Professional ratings
Review scores
Source	Rating
AllMusic	4.5/5 stars

Hair of the Dog is the sixth studio album by the Scottish hard rock band Nazareth, released in April 1975. The album was recorded at Escape Studios, Kent, with additional recording and mixing at AIR Studios, London. It is the group's best-known and highest-selling release, with over two million copies sold worldwide.

After three albums with Deep Purple's Roger Glover producing, Manny Charlton stepped into that position, one he filled for several subsequent albums.

== Background ==
Hair of The Dog was Nazareth's first big hit album (aside from the minor success of Razamanaz), including classics such as the title track, a version of The Everly Brothers' "Love Hurts" (on the US version, but not the Canadian/European, it replaced the original "Guilty"), "Beggars Day" and "Please Don't Judas Me".

According to Nazareth frontman Dan McCafferty, the track on Hair of the Dog in which a dishonest young woman finally meets her match provided the original album title with its recognizable chorus of "now you're messing with a… a son of a bitch!" (an "heir of the dog"). Nazareth's record label wasn't about to let them name the project Son of a Bitch. Thus, Hair of the Dog was selected as a compromise, putting the finishing touches on a career-defining release. The album title is often considered to be a shortened form of the phrase describing a folk hangover cure, "the hair of the dog that bit you".

The album was first reissued on CD in the USA in 1984; the disc was manufactured in Japan with the inserts printed in Japan. There are also remastered editions released since 1997 with different sets of bonus tracks. The name of the creature on the album cover is unknown.

The album cover art was designed by David Fairbrother-Roe.

A tribute came in 1993 when Guns N' Roses covered Nazareth's "Hair of the Dog" on "The Spaghetti Incident?"; consolation after they turned down Axl Rose's request for the group to play at his wedding. "Axl really made me more aware of Nazareth…" recalled GNR guitarist Slash, "because he can sing like that McCafferty guy, and really dug his voice. And so I remember listening to Nazareth a lot at one point." Rose mentioned McCafferty's vocals, specifically on "Love Hurts", as being very influential to his early singing development.

== Track listing ==
All songs written by Manny Charlton, Dan McCafferty, Pete Agnew, Darrell Sweet, except where noted.

Side one
No.	Title	Writer(s)	Length
1.	"Hair of the Dog"		4:11
2.	"Miss Misery"		4:40
3.	"Guilty" (International editions)	Randy Newman	3:38
4.	"Changin' Times"		6:03

Side two
No.	Title	Writer(s)	Length
5.	"a) Beggars Day" (Crazy Horse cover) (3:45) "b) Rose in the Heather (Note: Title per original LP release; at least one later reissue lists this track as "Rose in Heather".)" (2:46)	a) Nils Lofgren	6:31
6.	"Whiskey Drinkin' Woman"		5:29
7.	"Please Don't Judas Me"		9:48
8.	"Love Hurts" (The Everly Brothers cover; originally track 3 on US edition)	Boudleaux Bryant	3:53

The remastered editions include both "Guilty" (track 3) and "Love Hurts" (track 8) plus the following bonus tracks:

=== 1997 Castle Communications / Essential ===
No.	Title	Writer(s)	Length
9.	"Down" (B-side to "Love Hurts" single)		3:55
10.	"Railroad Boy" (B-side to "Holy Roller" single)	Darrell Sweet, Manny Charlton, Pete Agnew	4:07
11.	"Hair of the Dog" (single edit)		3:21

=== 2001 30th Anniversary Edition ===
No.	Title	Writer(s)	Length
9.	"Down" (B-side to "Love Hurts" single)		3:55
10.	"Holy Roller" (single A-side)		3:23
11.	"Railroad Boy" (B-side to "Holy Roller" single)	Darrell Sweet, Manny Charlton, Pete Agnew	4:07
12.	"Hair of the Dog" (single edit)		3:21
13.	"Holy Roller" (extended alternate mix)		4:16

=== 2010 Salvo Records Remaster ===
No.	Title	Writer(s)	Length
9.	"My White Bicycle" (Tomorrow cover; also available on the 30th anniversary edition of Close Enough for Rock 'n' Roll album)	Ken Burgess, Keith Hopkins	3:26
10.	"Holy Roller" (single)		3:25
11.	"Railroad Boy" (B-side of "Holy Roller")		4:07
12.	"Hair of the Dog" (BBC live recording)		3:47
13.	"Holy Roller" (BBC live recording)		4:22
14.	"Teenage Nervous Breakdown" (Little Feat cover; BBC live recording)	Lowell George	4:22
15.	"This Flight Tonight" (Joni Mitchell cover; BBC live recording)	Joni Mitchell	3:38
16.	"Road Ladies" (Frank Zappa cover; BBC live recording)	Frank Zappa	7:03

- BBC live recordings recorded at Paris Theatre. First transmission date: 27 November 1975
- The song "Hair of the Dog" was also covered by Guns N' Roses on their album The Spaghetti Incident? in 1993, and by Britny Fox on their album Boys in Heat in 1989.

== Personnel ==
Band members

- Dan McCafferty – lead & backing vocals, talk box on "Hair of the Dog"
- Manny Charlton – electric guitar, synthesizer
- Pete Agnew – bass, backing vocals
- Darrell Sweet – drums, percussion, backing vocals

Additional musicians

- Max Middleton – piano on "Guilty"
- Simon Phillips – tabla on "Please Don't Judas Me"
- Vicki Brown, Liza Strike, Barry St. John – backing vocals on "Guilty"
- Vicky Silva – backing vocals on "Please Don't Judas Me"

== Charts ==
Chart (1975–76)	Peak position
Austrian Albums (Ö3 Austria)	7
Canada Top Albums/CDs (RPM)	20
Finnish Albums (The Official Finnish Charts)	14
German Albums (Offizielle Top 100)	27
Norwegian Albums (VG-lista)	5
US Billboard 200	17

== Certifications ==
Region	Certification	Certified units/sales
Canada (Music Canada)	Gold	50,000^{^}
United States (RIAA)	Platinum	1,000,000^{^}
^{^} Shipments figures based on certification alone.
