= One Lonesome Saddle =

Studio album by Ray LaMontagne
- Genre: Folk
- Producer: Carl Franklin

One Lonesome Saddle is a self-released album by Ray LaMontagne. A small number of copies were given away and sold to various people before Ray Lamontagne instructed the album's producer Carl Franklin (no relation to film director and actor) to "Bury the recordings".

On October 1, 2009 Brandi Carlile opened for Ray at the Calvin Theater in Northampton Massachusetts. At that show I (Michael Phillips) personally gave a copy of One Lonesome Saddle to Brandi Carlile who was selling merch, and asked her if she would give it Ray along with a letter written by Carl Franklin. The letter introduced me as the person with the recording and contained very personal communications from Carl to Ray seeking to reconcile issues from their past. The letter also explained that Carl had given me the recording as I hoped to be able to release them online for everyone to enjoy. I asked Brandi Carlile if she would communicate this to Ray and give him the letter and CD. She enthusiastically agreed and ran backstage where Ray was preparing to take the stage. 10 minutes later she came back and told me that Ray said I could do whatever I wanted with the music. And that ray has "moved on" from it. A few days later I released the music in a discussion board for Ray Lamontagne fans. If you really want to verify this you could probably find that post somewhere. I have the original proposed cover art as well.

== Track listing ==
Two different versions of the album exist, with slightly different track listings on each.

=== Version 1 ===
1. "Down to the River"
2. "One Lonesome Saddle"
3. "Roadhouse Girl"
4. "Poor Boy"
5. "Carry Me"
6. "Hobo Blues"
7. "Sugar Mama"
8. "Shucking the Corn"
9. "Whiskey Train"
10. "Shelter"
11. "Crazy Dreamers"

=== The "OLS Sessions" ===
1. "Vigilante Man"
2. "Hobo Blues"
3. "One Lonesome Saddle"
4. "Poor Boy"
5. "Carry Me"
6. "Whiskey Train"
7. "Shelter"
8. "Big Boned Woman"
9. "Still Can't Feel the Gin"
10. "Roadhouse Girl"
11. "Everything I Need"
