= Tattooed on My Brain =

Studio album by Nazareth
- Released: 12 October 2018
- Label: Frontiers
- Producer: Yann Rouiller

Nazareth chronology
Rock 'n' Roll Telephone (2014)	Tattooed on My Brain (2018)	Surviving the Law (2022)

Tattooed on My Brain is the 24th studio album by the Scottish hard rock band Nazareth. It was released on 12 October 2018 by Frontiers Records. It was produced by Yann Rouiller who also worked with Nazareth on their previous albums, The Newz (2008) and Rock 'n' Roll Telephone (2014). It is the first Nazareth album to feature new vocalist Carl Sentance, replacing original singer Dan McCafferty who had to leave the band in 2013 due to health issues.

== Track listing ==
All lyrics are written by Carl Sentance, Pete Agnew, Jimmy Murrison and Lee Agnew.

No.	Title	Length
1.	"Never Dance with the Devil"	3:00
2.	"Tattooed on My Brain"	2:49
3.	"State of Emergency"	3:41
4.	"Rubik’s Romance"	4:05
5.	"Pole To Pole"	4:21
6.	"Push"	3:48
7.	"The Secret Is Out"	5:30
8.	"Don’t Throw Your Love Away"	3:37
9.	"Crazy Molly"	3:02
10.	"Silent Symphony"	3:48
11.	"What Goes Around"	4:00
12.	"Change"	3:56
13.	"You Call Me"	6:10

== Personnel ==
Nazareth

- Carl Sentance – lead vocals
- Jimmy Murrison – guitars
- Pete Agnew – bass guitar, backing vocals; lead vocals on "You Call Me"
- Lee Agnew – drums

== Charts ==
Chart (2018)	Peak position
Austrian Albums (Ö3 Austria)	39
Czech Albums (ČNS IFPI)	66
German Albums (Offizielle Top 100)	80
Scottish Albums (OCC)	43
Swiss Albums (Schweizer Hitparade)	28
UK Independent Albums (OCC)	23
UK Rock & Metal Albums (OCC)	3
