= Ship of Dreams =

Ship of Dreams may refer to:

- "Ship of Dreams", a song by Nazareth from their 1980 album Malice in Wonderland
- "Ship of Dreams", a song by Hawkwind from their 1990 album Space Bandits
- Ship of Dreams (album), a 2004 album by David Knopfler

== See also ==
- "The Ship of Dreams", referencing RMS Titanic in the 1997 eponymous film Titanic
