= Big Dogz =

Studio album by Nazareth
- Released: 15 April 2011
- Genres: Hard rock; blues rock
- Length: 55:39
- Label: Edel Records
- Producer: Jimmy Murrison

Nazareth chronology
The Newz (2008)	Big Dogz (2011)	Rock 'n' Roll Telephone (2014)

Professional ratings
Review scores
Source	Rating
Galeria Musical	3/5 stars
AllMusic	3.5/5 stars

Big Dogz is the twenty-second album by the Scottish rock band Nazareth, released in April 2011. It was produced by Jimmy Murrison.

== Track listing ==
All songs written by Nazareth

No.	Title	Length
1.	"Big Dog's Gonna Howl"	3:58
2.	"Claimed"	3:55
3.	"No Mean Monster"	5:01
4.	"When Jesus Comes to Save the World Again"	6:24
5.	"Radio"	4:17
6.	"Time and Tide"	7:20
7.	"Lifeboat"	4:58
8.	"The Toast"	3:59
9.	"Watch Your Back"	4:32
10.	"Butterfly"	5:30
11.	"Sleeptalker"	5:45

== Personnel ==
Nazareth

- Dan McCafferty - lead vocals
- Jimmy Murrison - guitars, backing vocals, piano
- Pete Agnew - bass, backing vocals
- Lee Agnew - drums, backing vocals

with:

- Pavel Bohatý - piano (10)
- Yann Roullier - shaker (5), tambourine (7)

== Charts ==
Chart (2011)	Peak position
Austrian Albums (Ö3 Austria)	55
German Albums (Offizielle Top 100)	73
UK Independent Albums (Official Charts)	42
UK Rock & Metal Albums (Official Charts)	24
Swiss Albums (Schweizer Hitparade)	70
