= Broken Down Angel =

Single by Nazareth

from the album Razamanaz
- B-side: "Witchdoctor Woman"
- Released: April 1973
- Length: 3:45
- Label: Mooncrest
- Songwriters: Dan McCafferty, Darrell Sweet, Pete Agnew, Manny Charlton
- Producer: Roger Glover

Nazareth singles chronology
"Broken Down Angel" (1973)	"Bad Bad Boy" (1973)

"Broken Down Angel" is a song and single by Scottish rock group Nazareth. It was first released in 1973.

== Background ==
The song features Dan McCafferty on lead vocals, Darrell Sweet on percussion, Pete Agnew on bass guitar and Manny Charlton on electric guitar. They wrote the track collectively. It was taken from their 1973 album Razamanaz, and proved to be popular on their tours undertaken in 1973. The same year it was featured on a live album, BBC Radio 1 Live in Concert. The song was the first of eleven of Nazareth's singles to appear in the UK Singles Chart. It reached number 9 in 1973, staying on the chart for 11 weeks.

== Charts ==
Chart (1973)	Peak position
Australian Singles (Kent Music Report)	57
Ireland (IRMA)	20
UK Singles (Official Charts)	9
