= Snakes 'n' Ladders =

Studio album by Nazareth
- Released: January 1989
- Genre: Hard rock
- Length: 49:04
- Label: Vertigo
- Producer: Joey Balin

Nazareth chronology
Cinema (1986)	Snakes 'n' Ladders (1989)	No Jive (1991)

Professional ratings
Review scores
Source	Rating
AllMusic	2/5 stars

Snakes 'n' Ladders is the seventeenth studio album by Scottish hard rock band Nazareth, released in 1989 through Vertigo Records. It was the final album to feature Manny Charlton, who left the band in 1990.

== Background ==
Snakes 'n' Ladders contains several cover songs alongside original songs by Nazareth. These include "Hang On to a Dream" by Tim Hardin and "Piece of My Heart", written by Bert Berns and Jerry Ragovoy. In particular, "Helpless" is a cover of a song written by Neil Young. The original version of "Helpless" appeared on Crosby, Stills, Nash & Young's album Déjà Vu.

Musically, the album prominently features Nazareth's characteristic hard rock and blues rock influences, particularly on tracks such as "Animals" and "Lady Luck". Some reviews have suggested that the album's production somewhat diminished the band's energy, while others have praised Charlton's guitar playing and McCafferty's vocals and subsequently reassessed the album as an overlooked gem.

Snakes 'n' Ladders was also the final Nazareth studio album to feature Charlton. He left the band in 1990.

== Track listing ==
All lyrics are written by Manny Charlton, Dan McCafferty, Pete Agnew, Darrell Sweet unless otherwise noted.

No.	Title	Writer(s)	Length
1.	"We Are Animals"	Manny Charlton	4:05
2.	"Lady Luck"		4:09
3.	"Hang On to a Dream" (Tim Hardin cover)	Tim Hardin	4:36
4.	"Piece of My Heart" (Erma Franklin cover)	Bert Berns, Jerry Ragovoy	4:28
5.	"Trouble"		4:58
6.	"The Key"	Manny Charlton	3:18
7.	"Back to School"	Agnew, Charlton, McCafferty, Sweet, Billy Rankin	4:53
8.	"Girls"		3:43
9.	"Donna - Get Off That Crack"	Manny Charlton	4:23
10.	"See You, See Me"		5:00
11.	"Helpless" (Crosby, Stills, Nash & Young cover)	Neil Young	4:58

1997 Castle Communications bonus tracks
No.	Title	Writer(s)	Length
12.	"Winner on the Night" (German single)	Dan McCafferty	4:12
13.	"Woke Up This Morning" (live)		5:34
14.	"Bad Bad Boy" (live)		4:36

- Three bonus tracks above are from German single Winner on the Night.

2002 (30th anniversary) bonus tracks
No.	Title	Writer(s)	Length
15.	"Hang On to a Dream" (Tim Hardin cover; single edit)	Tim Hardin	3:38
16.	"Lady Luck" (extended version)		6:00
17.	"We Are Animals" (edited alternate take)	Manny Charlton	3:28
18.	"Trouble" (single version)		3:33

== Personnel ==
Band members

- Dan McCafferty – vocals
- Manny Charlton – guitars, keyboards & computer programming
- Pete Agnew – bass guitar
- Darrell Sweet – drums

Other credits

- Joey Balin – producer
- Engineered and mixed by Martin Heyes
- Sleeve design – A.Backhausen, Cologne
- Illustration – Marc Klinnert
- Manny Elias – drum programming
- Phil Spalding – additional bass parts
- Dzal Martin – additional guitar parts
- Danny Cummings – percussion on "Trouble"
- Mark Feltham – harmonica on "Lady Luck"

== Charts ==
Chart (1989)	Peak position
Norwegian Albums (VG-lista)	10
Swiss Albums (Schweizer Hitparade)	26
