= Manny Charlton Band =

- Also known as: MCB
- Origin: Spain, United States
- Genres: Hard rock, Heavy metal, Roots rock
- Years active: 1998 — 2003; 2010 — 2022
- Labels: GB Records/4818 Records
- Past members: Manny Charlton; Steve Froese; Gary McGrath
- Website: www.mannycharltonband.com

The Manny Charlton Band is a band put together by Nazareth guitarist, Manny Charlton. The band has had members attached to the records made, example the “Hellacious” record includes singer Robin DeLorenzo on lead vocals, Tim Bogert of Vanilla Fudge, and drummer Walfredo Reyes Jr. They scheduled a tour for summer of 2012 and was supported by Robin Delorenzo, Andy Weaver and Gary McGrath as the band. The albumHellacious was produced by Gary Bryant McGrath (GB Records/4818 Records). The album includes some special guests such as Steven Adler of Guns N' Roses and Vivian Campbell of Def Leppard.

== Discography ==
Hellacious is the name of the Manny Charlton Band's 2012 album featuring the lineup named above. It has a set of original songs written by both Charlton and DeLorenzo and some remakes of Nazareth tunes. On July 1, 2012, producer and manager Gary McGrath announced the album's physical US release for August 14, 2012, and the album was released on March 15, 2013, in online stores.
