= Move Me (Nazareth album) =

Studio album by Nazareth
- Released: 17 October 1994
- Studio: at C.A.S. Studios Schuren, Germany
- Genre: Hard rock
- Length: 44:30
- Label: Polydor
- Producer: Tony Taventer, Nazareth

Nazareth chronology
From the Vaults (1993)	Move Me (1994)	Boogaloo (1998)

Professional ratings
Review scores
Source	Rating
Allmusic	3/5 stars

Move Me is the nineteenth studio album by the Scottish hard rock band Nazareth, released in 1994.

The sonic retooling of Nazareth continued with Billy Rankin standing his ground, taking on more songwriting responsibilities. Of the eleven tracks on the Move Me, eight are credited solely to Rankin, who also received co-writing credits on three others. Returning to CAS Studios in Shuren, Germany, Nazareth teamed up with Tony Taverner to handle the production.

== Track listing ==
All tracks are written by Billy Rankin unless otherwise noted

No.	Title	Writer(s)	Length
1.	"Let Me Be Your Dog"		4:36
2.	"Can't Shake Those Shakes"	Billy Rankin, Mick Paul	3:22
3.	"Crack Me Up"		3:42
4.	"Move Me"		3:45
5.	"Steamroller"	Pete Agnew, Rankin, Dan McCafferty	4:28
6.	"Stand By Your Beds"	Agnew, Rankin, Thom Hardwell	4:13
7.	"Rip It Up"		3:34
8.	"Demon Alcohol"		2:58
9.	"You Had It Comin'"		4:39
10.	"Bring It On Home to Mama"		4:00
11.	"Burning Down"		4:45

=== Bonus Tracks (The Unplugged Versions) ===
No.	Title	Writer(s)	Length
12.	"Razamanaz"	Agnew, Charlton, McCafferty, Sweet	4:34
13.	"My White Bicycle" (Tomorrow cover)	Ken Burgess, Keith Hopkins	2:56
14.	"This Flight Tonight" (Joni Mitchell cover)	Joni Mitchell	4:00

=== 1997 Castle Communications bonus tracks ===
No.	Title	Writer(s)	Length
12.	"Love Hurts" (The Everly Brothers cover; rock orchestra version)	Boudleaux Bryant	4:06
13.	"Razamanaz" (unplugged)	Agnew, Charlton, McCafferty, Sweet	4:34
14.	"My White Bicycle" (Tomorrow cover; unplugged)	Burgess, Hopkins	2:56
15.	"This Flight Tonight" (Joni Mitchell cover; unplugged)	Joni Mitchell	4:00

=== 2002 30th Anniversary bonus tracks ===
No.	Title	Writer(s)	Length
16.	"Let Me Be Your Dog" (edited version)		5:32
17.	"Can't Shake Those Shakes" (edited version)	Billy Rankin, Mick Paul	2:53
18.	"Move Me" (edited version)		3:35

=== 2011 Salvo and 2014 vinyl bonus track ===
No.	Title	Writer(s)	Length
16.	"Love Hurts" (The Everly Brothers cover; instrumental orchestra version)	Boudleaux Bryant	4:08

- The 2011 remastered CD release of Move Me was paired with Boogaloo

== Personnel ==
=== Band members ===
- Dan McCafferty - vocals
- Billy Rankin - guitars
- Pete Agnew - bass guitar
- Darrell Sweet - drums
- Produced by Tony Taverner and Nazareth

== Charts ==
Chart (1994)	Peak position
Swiss Albums (Schweizer Hitparade)	36
