= Rampant (album) =

Studio album by Nazareth
- Released: 26 April 1974
- Recorded: Montreux, Switzerland
- Genre: Hard rock
- Length: 39:43
- Label: Mooncrest
- Producers: Roger Glover, Manny Charlton

Nazareth chronology
Loud 'n' Proud (1973)	Rampant (1974)	Hair of the Dog (1975)

Professional ratings
Review scores
Source	Rating
AllMusic	3/5 stars

Rampant is the fifth studio album by the Scottish hard rock band Nazareth, released in 1974. It was their third album to be produced by Roger Glover, and proved to be the last time they would work with him.

The track "Loved and Lost" was sampled by DJ Shadow on "Enemy Lines" from his 2011 album The Less You Know, The Better.

== Background ==
It was recorded in 1974 on the shores of Lake Geneva in Montreux, Switzerland, with the help of the Rolling Stones Mobile Studio and produced by former Deep Purple's bassist Roger Glover, and this was his last collaboration with the group.

With this album, Nazareth make a slight musical change incorporating Southern rock intonations into some of their songs ("Glad When You're Gone", "Jet Lag" or the title that opens the "Silver Dollar Forger"). AllMusic critic Donald A. Guarisco compares the sound of the album as a cross between the sound of early AC/DC albums and Lynyrd Skynyrd's most "Hard rock" titles.

== Track listing ==
All tracks are written by Pete Agnew, Manny Charlton, Dan McCafferty, Darrell Sweet unless otherwise noted.

Side one
No.	Title	Length
1.	"Silver Dollar Forger (Parts 1 & 2)"	5:36
2.	"Glad When You're Gone"	4:17
3.	"Loved and Lost"	5:12
4.	"Shanghai'd in Shanghai"	3:43

Side two
No.	Title	Writer(s)	Length
5.	"Jet Lag"		6:43
6.	"Light My Way"		4:09
7.	"Sunshine"		4:15
8.	"a) Shapes of Things" "b) Space Safari"	a) McCarty, Relf, Samwell-Smith b) Agnew, Charlton, McCafferty, Sweet	6:21

=== 30th Anniversary Bonus Tracks ===
No.	Title	Writer(s)	Length
9.	"Shanghai'd in Shanghai" (US version)		3:42
10.	"Shapes of Things" (single edit)	McCarty, Relf, Samwell-Smith	3:21
11.	"Sunshine" (edited version)		2:59
12.	"Silver Dollar Forger" (edited version)		3:49

=== Salvo Records Remaster Bonus Tracks ===
Salvo Records released a version in 2010 with the following bonus tracks:

No.	Title	Length
9.	"Down" (B-side single to "Love Hurts")	3:54
10.	"Razamanaz" (BBC live recording from Golders Green Hippodrome, London, 24. 11. 1977)	4:32
11.	"Night Woman" (BBC live recording from Golders Green Hippodrome)	4:00
12.	"Alcatraz" (BBC live recording from Golders Green Hippodrome)	4:22
13.	"Vigilante Man" (BBC live recording from Golders Green Hippodrome)	5:43
14.	"Morning Dew" (BBC live recording from Golders Green Hippodrome)	7:38
15.	"Broken Down Angel" (BBC live recording from Golders Green Hippodrome)	4:26
16.	"Woke Up This Morning" (BBC live recording from Golders Green Hippodrome)	4:58

== Personnel ==
=== Band members ===
- Dan McCafferty – vocals, photography
- Pete Agnew – bass guitar, guitar, background vocals, liner notes
- Manny Charlton – guitars, producer, photography
- Darrell Sweet – drums, background vocals, liner notes, photography

=== Additional musicians ===
- Vicki Brown, Barry St. John, Liza Strike – background vocals
- Jon Lord – piano on "Glad When You're Gone" and "Shanghai'd In Shanghai
- Roger Glover – synthesizer on "Silver Dollar Forger (Parts 1 & 2)" and "Shapes Of Things/Space Safari"

=== Other credits ===
- Roger Glover – producer
- Richard Roy – assistant mastering engineer
- Red Steel – revised notes
- Louie Austin – engineer
- Robert M Corich and Mike Brown – remastering
- Mick Carpenter – project coordinator

== Charts ==
=== Weekly charts ===
Chart (1974)	Peak position
Austrian Albums (Ö3 Austria)	1
Canada Top Albums/CDs (RPM)	80
Finnish Albums (The Official Finnish Charts)	3
German Albums (Offizielle Top 100)	11
Norwegian Albums (VG-lista)	3
UK Albums (Official Charts)	13
US Billboard 200	157

=== Year-end charts ===
Chart (1974)	Position
German Albums (Offizielle Top 100)	34

== Certifications ==
Region	Certification	Certified units/sales
Canada (Music Canada)	Gold	50,000^{^}
^{^} Shipments figures based on certification alone.
