= Nazareth (album) =

Studio album by Nazareth
- Released: 4 November 1971
- Recorded: July–August 1971
- Studios: AIR, London: Trident, London
- Genres: Hard rock; blues rock; country rock
- Length: 40:21
- Labels: Pegasus (original UK release); Mooncrest (first UK reissue); Mountain Records (1975 UK reissue); Warner Bros. (original US release); A&M (1988 US reissue); Philips (Germany); Vertigo (Netherlands)
- Producer: Dave Hitchcock

Nazareth chronology
Nazareth (1971)	Exercises (1972)

Nazareth is the debut album by the Scottish hard rock band Nazareth, released in 1971. The album featured the hit single "Dear John" and a cover of "Morning Dew."

== Background ==
Nazareth originated in Dunfermline, Scotland, in 1961 as a cover band called The Shadettes. In their early years, they performed at local clubs and events, playing a variety of rock music and pop music.

In 1968, with the addition of guitarist Manny Charlton, the band began focusing on original material, and their sound gradually shifted toward a harder rock style.

By late 1968, the members took inspiration for their new name from the lyrics of "The Weight" by the Canadian-American rock band The Band, and adopted the name Nazareth. To pursue their musical career more seriously, they relocated from Scotland to London. There, the band members lived together in shared housing and began preparing for recording. They signed with Pegasus Records, marking the start of their official debut.

In the summer of 1971, Nazareth recorded their debut album at London's AIR Studios and Trident Studios. During this period, support from their manager, Bill Fehilly, and early guidance from Roger Glover, bassist of Deep Purple, played an important role in shaping the band's early work.

== Critical reception ==
Professional ratings
Review scores
Source	Rating
Allmusic	2.5/5 stars

Nazareth received little attention upon its initial release, but it was later reevaluated by critics and fans as a work that showcased the band's potential and musical individuality. In particular, its raw yet serious sound, which combined elements of blues rock and hard rock, is considered an important starting point that hinted at the direction of their subsequent works.

The music website Metal Music Archives described the album as "a work combining Scottish-infused blues with thunderous heavy rock," acknowledging its presence as a debut. In an interview with Louder Sound, bassist Pete Agnew recalled that the music of this period was filled with "unrefined, raw energy," citing the album as the moment when the band began to find their own distinctive sound.

== Track listing ==
All tracks are written by Manny Charlton, Dan McCafferty, Pete Agnew, Darrell Sweet unless otherwise noted.

Side one
No.	Title	Writer(s)	Length
1.	"Witchdoctor Woman"	Charlton, McCafferty	4:09
2.	"Dear John"		3:48
3.	"Empty Arms, Empty Heart"		3:15
4.	"I Had a Dream"		3:23
5.	"Red Light Lady"		6:00

Side two
No.	Title	Writer(s)	Length
6.	"Fat Man"	Agnew, Charlton, McCafferty	3:25
7.	"Country Girl"		4:05
8.	"Morning Dew" (Bonnie Dobson cover)	Bonnie Dobson	7:06
9.	"King Is Dead"		4:47

== Personnel ==
Nazareth

- Dan McCafferty - lead vocals
- Darrell Sweet - drums, backing vocals
- Pete Agnew - bass guitar, guitar, backing vocals, lead vocals (4)
- Manny Charlton - guitar, backing vocals

Additional musicians

- Dave Stewart - organ (5), harmonium (4)
- Pete Wingfield - piano (2, 7)
- Pete York - congas, jawbone, tambourine (9)
- B.J. Cole - slide guitar (7)
- Colin Frechter - string and brass arrangements (5, 9)

Technical

- Mike Brown - remastering
- Robert M. Corich - liner notes, remastering
- Roy Thomas Baker - engineer
- John Punter - string recording
- Dave Hitchcock - producer
- C.C.S. Associates - sleeve design
- Jim Wilson - photography
