= Holiday (Nazareth song) =

Single by Nazareth

from the album Malice in Wonderland
- B-side: "Talkin' About Love"
- Released: 1 February 1980
- Genre: AOR
- Length: 3:35
- Label: A&M; Mountain
- Songwriter: Nazareth
- Producer: Jeff Baxter

Nazareth singles chronology
"Every Young Man's Dream" (1980)	"Holiday" (1980)	"Dressed to Kill" (1980)

Audio
- "Holiday" on YouTube

"Holiday" is a song by Nazareth from their 1980 album Malice in Wonderland. The single reached No. 87 on the Billboard Hot 100, their only charting song apart from "Love Hurts". The music video featured the arcade game Super Road Champions. The song has also appeared on the 2002 compilation album, Nazology: Best of Nazareth. AllMusic's Donald Guarisco gave a positive review of the song in his review of the Malice in Wonderland album.

== Charts ==
Chart (1980)	Peak position
Canada Top Singles (RPM)	21
US Billboard Hot 100	87

== Certifications ==
Region	Certification	Certified units/sales
Canada (Music Canada)	Gold	75,000^{^}
^{^} Shipments figures based on certification alone.
