= Boogaloo (Nazareth album) =

1998 studio album by Nazareth

Studio album by Nazareth
- Released: 25 August 1998 (UK)
- Recorded: 1997
- Studio: Parkgate studios, Catsfield
- Genre: Hard rock
- Length: 50:45
- Label: SPV GmbH; Steamhammer (UK)
- Producer: Mike Ging

Nazareth chronology
| Move Me (1994) | Boogaloo (1998) | Greatest Hits Volume II (1998) |

Professional ratings
Review scores
| Source | Rating |
|---|---|
| AllMusic | 2/5 stars |

Boogaloo is the twentieth studio album by the Scottish hard rock band Nazareth, released in August 1998. It was produced by Mike Ging.

It was the last studio recording to feature drummer and founding member Darrell Sweet before his death in 1999. The album also features guest performances by bassist Pete Agnew's son Lee, who later replaced Sweet as the band's drummer. The album was recorded at the Parkgate studios, Catsfield in East Sussex in 1997. 11 of the 12 tracks were mixed in early 1998, with horns and guitar overdubs added. During the original recording, the Hale-Bopp comet was clearly visible.

Original versions of some tracks (as mixed in 1997), including one that didn't make the 1998 remix, were included in the Loud And Proud box set.

The character on the album artwork is known as 'Boogaloo'. The phrase comes from what the band would say when ready to go onstage – "Let's Boogaloo", a choice made in discussion with the fanclub editor who was present during the recording.

== Track listing ==
All lyrics are written by Pete Agnew, Dan McCafferty, Darrell Sweet, Jimmy Murrison, Ronnie Leahy.

| No. | Title | Writer(s) | Length |
|---|---|---|---|
| 1. | "Light Comes Down" | | 3:31 |
| 2. | "Cheerleader" | | 3:14 |
| 3. | "Loverman" | | 4:30 |
| 4. | "Open Up Woman" | | 4:29 |
| 5. | "Talk Talk" | | 3:52 |
| 6. | "Nothing So Good" | | 5:08 |
| 7. | "Party in the Kremlin" | | 3:37 |
| 8. | "God Save the South" | | 6:35 |
| 9. | "Robber and the Roadie" | | 4:21 |
| 10. | "Waiting" | | 5:43 |
| 11. | "May Heaven Keep You" | Agnew, Charlton, McCafferty, Sweet | 5:46 |

=== 2011 Salvo and 2014 vinyl bonus tracks ===
| No. | Title | Length |
|---|---|---|
| 12. | "Laid to Wasted" | 4:16 |
| 13. | "Walk By Yourself" | 5:02 |

- The bonus tracks are from The Very Best of Nazareth compilation (2001) released as part of 30th anniversary digitally remastered catalogue.
- The 2011 remastered CD release of Boogaloo was paired with Move Me.

== Personnel ==
Nazareth

- Pete Agnew – bass guitar, backing vocals
- Dan McCafferty – lead vocals
- Ronnie Leahy – keyboards
- Jimmy Murrison – guitars
- Darrell Sweet – drums

Additional personnel

- Lee Agnew – percussion
- Simon Clark – alto & baritone saxophones
- Tim Sanders – tenor saxophone
- Roddy Lorimer, Paul Spong – trumpet
