= Ronnie Leahy =

Scottish musician

- Born: Ronald Leahy; 4 October 1947 (age 78); Glasgow, Scotland
- Occupation: Musician
- Instruments: Keyboards
- Member of: Dr. Hip and the Blues Generation
- Formerly of: White Trash; Stone the Crows; The Dukes; Nazareth

Ronald Leahy (born 4 October 1947) is a Scottish keyboard player best known for his work with Jack Bruce, Jon Anderson and Steve Howe on Howe's second solo album. Leahy was also a member of Nazareth from 1998 to 2002, after which he retired from touring.

== Career ==
Leahy first gained recognition as keyboardist in the second line-up of Scottish band Stone the Crows. He also played in White Trash with whom he published four singles in 1969. This band was formed by Fraser Watson on guitar, Ian McMillan on bass and vocals, Ronnie Leahy on keyboards and drummer Timi Donald.

He also played with Tandoori Cassette, a short-lived rock band formed by Barriemore Barlow after leaving Jethro Tull in 1980, with Zal Cleminson of Nazareth on guitar and Charlie Tumahai on bass. And then he went on tour with Jon Anderson in Europe and also recorded Song of Seven the same year, and then in 1982 after he also played on Anderson's Animation album. He currently plays with Scottish-based blues band Dr. Hip and the Blues Operation.

== Discography ==
- White Trash : 4 singles :

- "Road to Nowhere" / "Illusions" (1969)
- "Golden Slumbers & Carry That Weight" / "Trash Can" (1969)
- "Golden Slumbers & Carry That Weight / "Trash Can" / "Road to Nowhere" / "Illusions" (Maxi-single, 1969)
- "Golden Slumbers Carry That Weight" / "Trash Can" (1969)

- Stone the Crows :

- Teenage Licks - (1971)
- Ontinuous Performance (1972)

- The Dukes :

- The Dukes (1979)

- Tandoori Cassette : 1 single :

- Angel Talk/Third World Briefcases (1980)

- Nazareth :

- Boogaloo (1998)
- Homecoming (2002) (Live)
- Alive & Kicking (2003) (Live)
- Surviving the Law (2022) guest appearance

== Participations ==
- The Dukes - The Dukes (1979)
- Steve Howe - The Steve Howe Album (1979)
- Jon Anderson - Song of Seven (1980)
- Jon Anderson - Animation (1982)

== Solo ==
- Ronnie Leahy : Ascendancy Music from the Edward Bennett Film (1983)
