= Rock 'n' Roll Telephone =

Studio album by Nazareth
- Released: 3 June 2014
- Genres: Hard rock; blues rock
- Length: 43:54
- Label: Union Square Music

Nazareth chronology
Big Dogz (2011)	Rock 'n' Roll Telephone (2014)	Tattooed on My Brain (2018)

Professional ratings
Review scores
Source	Rating
Get Ready to Rock	4/5 stars
Anti Music	5/5 stars

Rock 'n' Roll Telephone is the twenty-third album by Scottish rock band Nazareth, released in June 2014 by Union Square Music. It is their last album with original singer Dan McCafferty who left the group before its release, and later died in 2022.

== Track listing ==
All tracks written by Jimmy Murrison, Dan McCafferty, Pete Agnew and Lee Agnew

No.	Title	Length
1.	"Boom Bang Bang"	3:17
2.	"One Set of Bones"	3:27
3.	"Back 2B4"	4:52
4.	"Winter Sunlight"	3:29
5.	"Rock 'n' Roll Telephone"	5:45
6.	"Punch a Hole in the Sky"	3:49
7.	"Long Long Time"	4:18
8.	"The Right Time"	4:50
9.	"Not Today"	3:26
10.	"Speakeasy"	3:17
11.	"God of the Mountain"	3:42

Bonus tracks
No.	Title	Length
12.	"Just a Ride"	2:50
13.	"Wanna Feel Good?"	3:50
14.	"Big Boy" (live)	5:39
15.	"Kentucky Fried Blues" (live)	4:32
16.	"Sunshine" (live)	3:42
17.	"Expect No Mercy" (live)	5:07
18.	"God Save the South" (live)	7:00

== Personnel ==
Nazareth

- Dan McCafferty – lead vocals
- Jimmy Murrison – guitars, backing vocals, keyboards
- Pete Agnew – bass, backing vocals
- Lee Agnew – drums, backing vocals, percussion, keyboards

== Charts ==
Chart (2014)	Peak position
Austrian Albums (Ö3 Austria)	35
German Albums (Offizielle Top 100)	39
Norwegian Albums (VG-lista)	37
Scottish Albums (Official Charts)	60
Swedish Albums (Sverigetopplistan)	58
Swiss Albums (Schweizer Hitparade)	31
UK Independent Albums (Official Charts)	28
UK Rock & Metal Albums (Official Charts)	13
