= Loud 'n' Proud =

Studio album by Nazareth
- Released: November 1973
- Recorded: 1973
- Genres: Hard rock, heavy metal
- Length: 37:07
- Label: Mooncrest
- Producer: Roger Glover

Nazareth chronology
Razamanaz (1973)	Loud 'n' Proud (1973)	Rampant (1974)

Professional ratings
Review scores
Source	Rating
AllMusic	4/5 stars

Loud 'n' Proud is the fourth studio album by the Scottish hard rock band Nazareth, and their second album released in 1973. The album was produced by Deep Purple's bassist Roger Glover.

== Background ==
This album reached 10th place in the UK Albums Chart, making it the group's best-ranked album. It also reached number one on the Austrian charts. In 1976, it was certified as a platinum record in Canada.

The single, a cover of Joni Mitchell's "This Flight Tonight", reached number 11 on the UK charts and number one on the German charts. Joni Mitchell, who recorded this song in 1971 for her album Blue, was impressed by the band's cover and sometimes humorously introduced her live performances of the song at concerts by saying "I'm going to perform a Nazareth song."

== Track listing ==
All tracks are written by Pete Agnew, Manny Charlton, Dan McCafferty, Darrell Sweet unless otherwise noted.

Side one
No.	Title	Writer(s)	Length
1.	"Go Down Fighting"		3:07
2.	"Not Faking It"		4:01
3.	"Turn On Your Receiver"		3:19
4.	"Teenage Nervous Breakdown" (Little Feat cover)	Lowell George	3:43
5.	"Free Wheeler"		5:31

Side two
No.	Title	Writer(s)	Length
6.	"This Flight Tonight" (Joni Mitchell cover)	Joni Mitchell	3:24
7.	"Child in the Sun"		4:51
8.	"The Ballad of Hollis Brown" (Bob Dylan cover)	Bob Dylan	9:11

=== 1996 Castle Communications Bonus Tracks ===
No.	Title	Writer(s)	Length
9.	"This Flight Tonight (US Version)"	Joni Mitchell	3:24
10.	"Go Down Fighting (US Version)"		3:05
11.	"The Ballad of Hollis Brown (Edited Version)"	Bob Dylan	5:09

=== 2001 30th Anniversary Bonus Track ===
No.	Title	Writer(s)	Length
9.	"This Flight Tonight (US Version)"	Joni Mitchell	3:24
10.	"Go Down Fighting (US Version)"		3:05
11.	"The Ballad of Hollis Brown (Edited Version)"	Bob Dylan	5:09
12.	"Free Wheeler (Edited Version)"		4:37

=== 2010 Salvo Records Remaster Bonus Tracks ===
BBC Sessions:

No.	Title	Length
9.	"Turn On Your Receiver"	3:38
10.	"Too Bad Too Sad"	2:52
11.	"Razamanaz"	3:53
12.	"Bad Bad Boy"	3:35

- BBC live recordings, recorded for The Bob Harris Show. First transmission date was 13 August 1973

== Personnel ==
=== Band members ===
- Dan McCafferty – lead vocals
- Darrell Sweet – percussion, drums, backing vocals
- Pete Agnew – bass guitar, Fuzz bass (track 8), backing vocals
- Manny Charlton (Manuel Charlton) – lead, slide and acoustic guitars, backing vocals

=== Other credits ===
- Roger Glover – producer, percussion (track 5)
- Mike Brown, Robert M. Corich – remastering
- Geoff Emerick, Bob Harper, John Mills – engineers
- Dave Field – sleeve

== Charts ==
=== Weekly charts ===
Chart (1973–74)	Peak position
Austrian Albums (Ö3 Austria)	1
Canada Top Albums/CDs (RPM)	17
Finnish Albums (The Official Finnish Charts)	3
German Albums (Offizielle Top 100)	8
Norwegian Albums (VG-lista)	9
UK Albums (Official Charts)	10
US Billboard 200	150

=== Year-end charts ===
Chart (1974)	Position
German Albums (Offizielle Top 100)	33

== Certifications ==
Region	Certification	Certified units/sales
Canada (Music Canada)	Platinum	100,000^{^}
Sweden (GLF)	Gold	30,000
^{^} Shipments figures based on certification alone.
