= Malice in Wonderland (Nazareth album) =

Studio album by Nazareth
- Released: February 8, 1980
- Recorded: 1979
- Studio: Compass Point (Nassau, Bahamas)
- Genres: Hard rock; AOR; new wave
- Length: 41:23
- Label: A&M
- Producer: Jeff Baxter

Nazareth chronology
No Mean City (1979)	Malice in Wonderland (1980)	The Fool Circle (1981)

Professional ratings
Review scores
Source	Rating
AllMusic	4/5 stars
Record Mirror	3/5 stars
Select	1/5

Malice in Wonderland is the eleventh studio album by Scottish hard rock band Nazareth, released in February 1980. After the heavy lurch of the previous album, the band chose to follow a more commercial path and the album produced the hit singles "Holiday" and "Heart's Grown Cold". This is the second and last studio album to feature guitarist Zal Cleminson of the Sensational Alex Harvey Band as a member of the band.

The album was re-issued on Compact Disc in June 1990. The larger 2010 edition brought a range of bonus tracks, all extracted from a concert at the legendary Hammersmith Odeon, which were broadcast by the BBC for the In Concert program in 1980. It is a very varied album, with melodic and heavy songs like "Talkin' to One of the Boys" and "Showdown at the Border" and the flirtation with a reggae feeling in "Big Boy".

== Track listing ==
All tracks are written by Dan McCafferty, Zal Cleminson, Manny Charlton, Pete Agnew, Darrell Sweet unless otherwise noted.

Side one
No.	Title	Writer(s)	Length
1.	"Holiday"		3:29
2.	"Showdown at the Border"	Cleminson	4:11
3.	"Talkin' to One of the Boys"	Cleminson, McCafferty, Agnew	4:13
4.	"Heart's Grown Cold"	Cleminson	4:14
5.	"Fast Cars"		4:35

Side two
No.	Title	Writer(s)	Length
6.	"Big Boy"	Cleminson	3:38
7.	"Talkin' 'Bout Love"	McCafferty, Cleminson, Charlton, Agnew, Sweet, Jeff Baxter	3:57
8.	"Fallen Angel"		4:44
9.	"Ship of Dreams"	Charlton	4:09
10.	"Turning a New Leaf"		4:00

=== 1998 bonus tracks ===
No.	Title	Writer(s)	Length
11.	"Heart's Grown Cold" (live 7-inch EP version)	Cleminson	3:56
12.	"Razamanaz" (live 7-inch EP version)	Agnew, Charlton, McCafferty, Sweet	4:16
13.	"Hair of the Dog" (live 7-inch EP version)	Agnew, Charlton, McCafferty, Sweet	4:37
14.	"Talkin' to One of the Boys" (live 7-inch EP version)	Cleminson, McCafferty, Agnew	4:48

- This remastered CD, released on Castle Records subsidiary Essential Records (ESMCD 617) in 1998, added four bonus tracks and extensive liner notes:
- These live tracks were recorded at London's Hammersmith Odeon and had been originally released as a 2 x 7 inch vinyl EP in a gatefold sleeve.
- An identical release was later issued on another Castle Records subsidiary, Sanctuary Records.

=== 30th anniversary bonus tracks ===
No.	Title	Length
11.	"Holiday" (single edit)	3:21
12.	"Ship of Dreams" (single edit)	3:10
13.	"Heart's Grown Cold" (live 7-inch EP version)	3:55
14.	"Talkin' to One of the Boys" (live 7-inch EP version)	4:45
15.	"Showdown at the Border" (live)	4:08
16.	"Holiday" (live)	3:25
17.	"Heart's Grown Cold" (live)	4:22

- The Hammersmith live songs from the 1998 remaster are not all on the 30th Anniversary Remaster, the compilers choosing to keep only the two songs relevant to the track list for Malice In Wonderland and omitting Razamanaz and Hair of the Dog.

=== 2010 remastered bonus tracks ===
No.	Title	Writer(s)	Length
11.	"I Want To (Do Everything for You)" (BBC live recording)	Joe Tex	5:12
12.	"Showdown at the Border" (BBC live recording)	Cleminson	4:18
13.	"Beggar's Day" (BBC live recording)	Nils Lofgren	3:54
14.	"Big Boy" (BBC live recording)	Cleminson	5:17
15.	"Holiday/This Flight Tonight" (BBC Live Recording)	McCafferty, Cleminson, Charlton, Agnew, Sweet / Joni Mitchell	7:06
16.	"Expect No Mercy" (BBC Live Recording)	McCafferty, Charlton, Agnew, Sweet	3:45
17.	"Broken Down Angel" (BBC Live Recording)	McCafferty, Charlton, Agnew, Sweet	4:59

- This remastered CD was released by Salvo records (SALVOCD043), August 2010.
- These BBC live recordings were recorded at Hammersmith Odeon, March 16, 1980.
- The live recording of "Beggar's Day" has not been available before this release.

== Personnel ==
=== Band members ===
- Dan McCafferty – vocals
- Manny Charlton – lead guitars
- Zal Cleminson – guitars, synthesizer
- Pete Agnew – bass guitar, backing vocals
- Darrell Sweet – drums

=== Other credits ===
- Jeff Baxter – producer tracks 1–10, guitar, synthesizer
- Greg Mathieson – string arrangements on "Fallen Angel"
- Paulinho Da Costa – percussion on "Turning a New Leaf" and "Talkin' 'Bout Love"
- Alan Estes – vibes on "Fast Cars"
- Venetta Fields, Sherlie Matthews, Paulette Brown – backing vocals on "Heart's Grown Cold"
- Terri & the Semiconductors – backing vocals on "Big Boy"
- Nazareth – producer tracks 11–14.
- Recorded at Compass Point Studios in Nassau, Bahamas.
- Amy Nagasawa – album design

== Charts ==
Chart (1980)	Peak position
Canada Top Albums/CDs (RPM)	19
German Albums (Offizielle Top 100)	43
Norwegian Albums (VG-lista)	9
US Billboard 200	41

== Certifications ==
Region	Certification	Certified units/sales
Canada (Music Canada)	Gold	50,000^{^}
^{^} Shipments figures based on certification alone.
