= Close Enough for Rock 'n' Roll =

Studio album by Nazareth
- Released: March 1976
- Genres: Hard rock; AOR
- Length: 38:12
- Label: Mountain
- Producer: Manny Charlton

Nazareth chronology
Greatest Hits (1975)	Close Enough for Rock 'n' Roll (1976)	Hot Tracks (1976)

Professional ratings
Review scores
Source	Rating
AllMusic	2.5/5 stars
Select	1/5

Close Enough for Rock 'n' Roll is the seventh studio album by the Scottish hard rock band Nazareth, released in 1976.

The lead track, "Telegram", describes the band's experience while touring of hangovers, travel by aeroplane and limousine, customs, FM radio, girls, breakfast, press reception, soundcheck and finally the show over a guitar riff that bursts into a short version of the Byrds hit before returning to the riff and the story. It includes the album title in the lyrics. This references a saying among guitar players: "It doesn't matter if your guitar isn't fully in tune, as long as it's 'close enough for rock 'n' roll.'" "Telegram" (parts 1–3 only) was Nazareth's concert opener for many years, including the 1981 shows recorded for the Snaz album.

== Track listing ==
All tracks are written by Manny Charlton, Dan McCafferty, Pete Agnew, Darrell Sweet unless otherwise noted.

Side one
No.	Title	Writer(s)	Length
1.	"Telegram" "Part 1: On Your Way" "Part 2: So You Wanna Be a Rock 'n' Roll Star" "Part 3: Sound Check" "Part 4: Here We Are Again"	(Agnew, Charlton, McCafferty, Sweet), (Roger McGuinn, Chris Hillman)	7:54
2.	"Vicki"		2:24
3.	"Homesick Again"		4:30
4.	"Vancouver Shakedown"		4:04

Side two
No.	Title	Writer(s)	Length
5.	"Born Under the Wrong Sign"		3:56
6.	"Loretta"		3:18
7.	"Carry Out Feelings"		3:18
8.	"Lift the Lid"		3:51
9.	"You're the Violin"	Jeff Barry	4:43

30th anniversary bonus tracks
No.	Title	Writer(s)	Length
10.	"My White Bicycle" (single)	Ken Burgess, Keith Hopkins	5:21
11.	"You're the Violin" (edited A-side)	Jeff Barry	3:35
12.	"Loretta" (alternate single version)		2:36
13.	"Carry Out Feelings" (US single edit)		3:18
14.	"Lift the Lid" (alternate single version)		3:29
15.	"My White Bicycle" (original single version)	Ken Burgess, Keith Hopkins	3:28
16.	"Telegram" (edited version Parts 1 and 2)		4:28

== Personnel ==
Nazareth

- Dan McCafferty – lead vocals
- Manny Charlton – guitar, producer
- Pete Agnew – bass, backing vocals, guitar, piano
- Darrell Sweet – drums, percussion

Production

- Nick Blagona – engineer
- John Punter – engineer
- Hipgnosis – sleeve design and photos

== Charts ==
Chart (1976)	Peak position
Canada Top Albums/CDs (RPM)	12
Dutch Albums (Album Top 100)	10
German Albums (Offizielle Top 100)	42
New Zealand Albums (RMNZ)	40
Swedish Albums (Sverigetopplistan)	9
US Billboard 200	24

== Certifications ==
Region	Certification	Certified units/sales
Canada (Music Canada)	Gold	50,000^{^}
^{^} Shipments figures based on certification alone.
