= The Newz (album) =

Studio album by Nazareth
- Released: 31 March 2008
- Recorded: late 2007
- Genre: Hard rock; blues rock
- Length: 74:31
- Label: Edel Records
- Producer: Yann Rouiller

Nazareth chronology
Live in Brazil (2007)	The Newz (2008)	Big Dogz (2011)

Professional ratings
Review scores
Source	Rating
Allmusic	3.5/5 stars

The Newz is the twenty-first studio album by the hard rock band Nazareth, released in March 2008. It is the first album by the band to feature new drummer and Pete Agnew’s son Lee, who replaced original drummer Darrell Sweet, who died in 1999.

== Track listing ==
All songs by Dan McCafferty, Pete Agnew, Jimmy Murrison, and Lee Agnew

No.	Title	Length
1.	"Goin' Loco"	5:24
2.	"Day at the Beach"	4:55
3.	"Liar"	6:43
4.	"See Me"	4:53
5.	"Enough Love"	5:49
6.	"Warning"	4:35
7.	"Mean Streets"	4:15
8.	"Road Trip"	2:47
9.	"Gloria"	5:47
10.	"Keep On Travellin'"	3:56
11.	"Loggin' On"	4:47
12.	"The Gathering"	7:08
13.	"Dying Breed"	13:23

- "Dying Breed" Includes the hidden track "The Goblin King" featuring Rammstein starting at 9:05; The vinyl edition doesn't contain the hidden track.

== Personnel ==
Nazareth

- Pete Agnew - bass guitar, backing vocals
- Dan McCafferty - lead vocals
- Jimmy Murrison - guitars
- Lee Agnew - drums

== Charts ==
Chart (2008)	Peak position
Austrian Albums (Ö3 Austria)	75
Swedish Albums (Sverigetopplistan)	51
Swiss Albums (Schweizer Hitparade)	68
