= Hair of the Dog (song) =

1975 single by Nazareth

Single by Nazareth

from the album Hair of the Dog
- Released: 14 March 1975
- Recorded: 1974
- Genre: Hard rock
- Length: 4:11
- Label: A&M (US); Vertigo (Europe)
- Songwriters: Dan McCafferty, Pete Agnew, Manny Charlton, Darrell Sweet
- Producer: Manny Charlton

Nazareth singles chronology
"Sunshine" (1974)	"Hair of the Dog" (1975)	"My White Bicycle" (1975)

Audio
- "Hair of the Dog" on YouTube

"Hair of the Dog" is a song by Scottish rock band Nazareth, released on their 1975 studio album, Hair of the Dog. The song, alongside "Love Hurts", remains their most successful and popular. Guns N' Roses covered the song on their 1993 album "The Spaghetti Incident?".

== Personnel ==
=== Nazareth ===
- Dan McCafferty – vocals, talk box
- Manny Charlton – guitars, synthesizer
- Pete Agnew – bass, backing vocals
- Darrell Sweet – drums, cowbell, tambourine, backing vocals

== Cover versions ==
"Hair of the Dog"

Promotional single by Guns N' Roses

from the album "The Spaghetti Incident?"
- Released: 1994
- Recorded: 1993
- Genre: Hard rock
- Length: 3:55
- Label: Geffen
- Songwriters: Dan McCafferty, Pete Agnew, Manny Charlton, Darrell Sweet
- Producers: Guns N' Roses and Mike Clink

=== Guns N' Roses version ===
American hard rock band Guns N' Roses covered the song on their 1993 album, "The Spaghetti Incident?". The cover was consolation after Nazareth turned down GN'R frontman Axl Rose's request for the group to play at his wedding. "Axl really made me more aware of Nazareth…" recalled GNR guitarist Slash, "because he can sing like that McCafferty guy, and really dug his voice. And so I remember listening to Nazareth a lot at one point." This version features the signature guitar riff from the Beatles' "Day Tripper", which is similar to the main riff of "Hair of the Dog", as a gag at the end.

=== Britny Fox version ===
American glam metal band Britny Fox covered the song on their 1989 studio album, Boys in Heat.

== Charts ==
=== Original version ===
Chart (1975)	Peak position
Germany (GfK)	44

=== Guns N' Roses version ===
Chart (1994)	Peak position
US Mainstream Rock (Billboard)	11
