= Nazareth (band) =

Scottish hard rock band

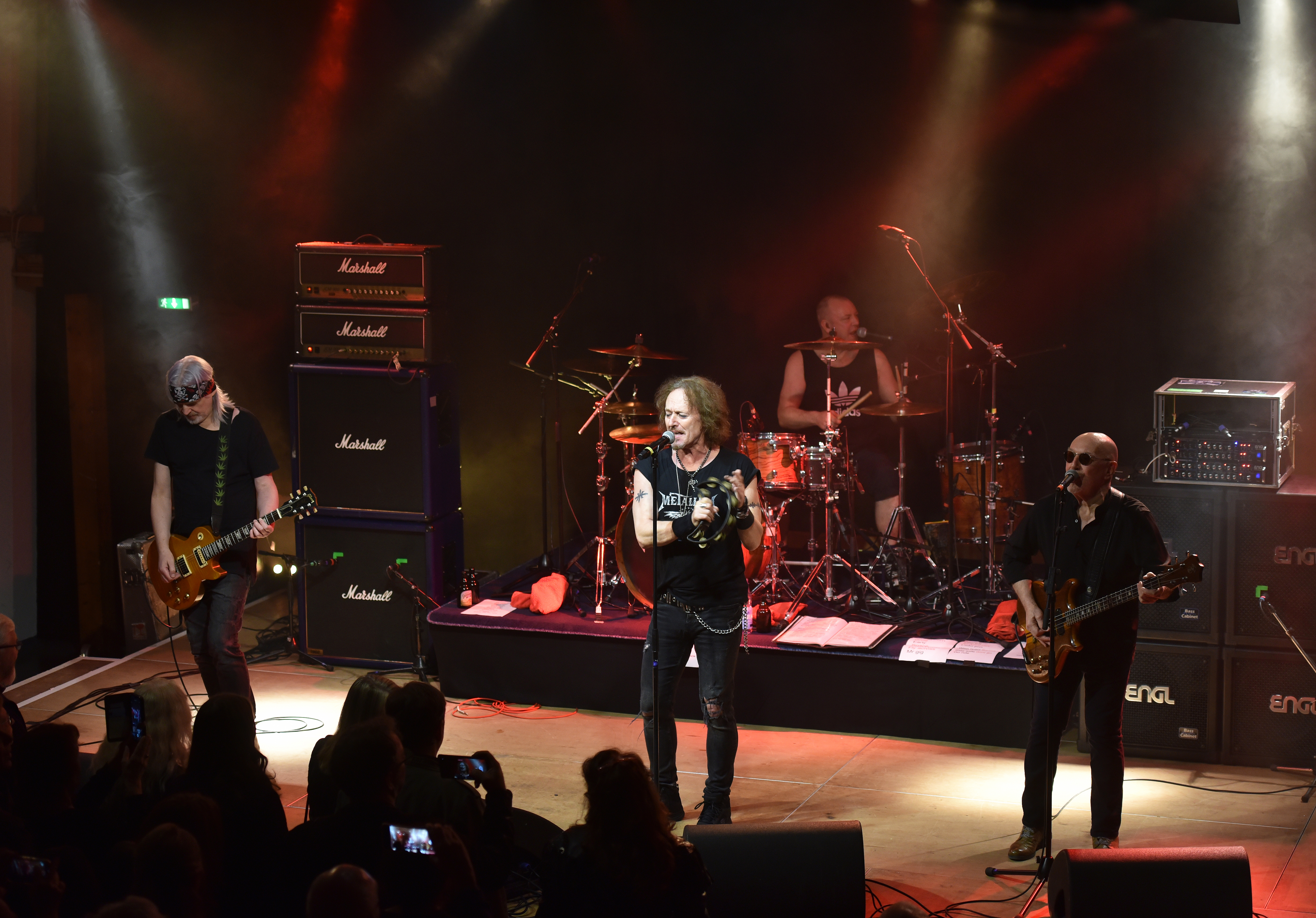
- Nazareth performing in 2022

Background information
- Origin: Dunfermline, Fife, Scotland
- Genres: Hard rock; heavy metal; blues rock
- Works: Discography
- Years active: 1968–present
- Labels: Mooncrest; NEMS Enterprises; A&M; Vertigo; Eagle
- Members: Pete Agnew; Jimmy Murrison; Lee Agnew; Gianni Pontillo
- Past members: Dan McCafferty; Darrell Sweet; Manny Charlton; Zal Cleminson; Billy Rankin; John Locke; Ronnie Leahy; Linton Osborne; Carl Sentance
- Website: nazareth.band

Nazareth are a Scottish hard rock band formed in Dunfermline in 1968 that had many hit singles and albums in Canada, the United Kingdom, and a number of other European countries beginning in the early 1970s. The breadth of their popularity expanded internationally, including in the United States, with their 1975 album Hair of the Dog, which featured their hits "Hair of the Dog" and a cover of the ballad "Love Hurts". They have continued to record and tour internationally for more than 50 years.

== Career ==
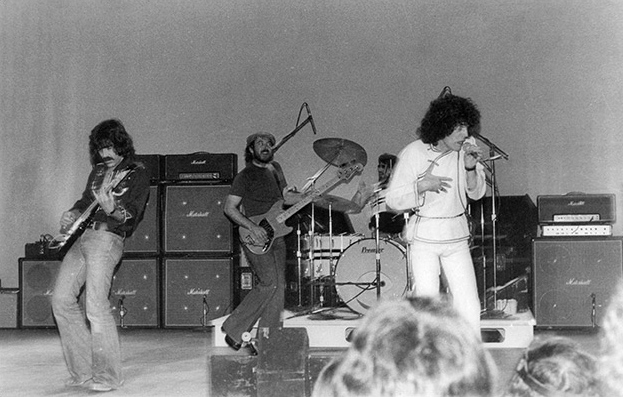
Nazareth performing in March 1976

Nazareth formed in December 1968 in Dunfermline, Scotland, from the remaining members of semi-professional local group the Shadettes (formed in 1961) by vocalist Dan McCafferty, guitarist Manny Charlton, bassist Pete Agnew (born 1946), and drummer Darrell Sweet (1947 - 1999). They were inspired by the Beatles and the Rolling Stones. Nazareth took their name from Nazareth, Pennsylvania, which is cited in the first line of the Band's classic song "The Weight" ("I pulled into Nazareth, was feelin' about half past dead...").

The band moved to London, England in 1970 and released their self titled debut album in 1971. After getting some attention with their second album Exercises, released in 1972, Nazareth supported Deep Purple on tour, and issued the Roger Glover-produced Razamanaz, in early 1973. This collection spawned two UK Top Ten hits, "Broken Down Angel" and "Bad Bad Boy". This was followed by Loud 'N' Proud in late 1973, which contained another hit with a cover of Joni Mitchell's song "This Flight Tonight". Then came another album Rampant, in 1974, that was equally successful although its only single, "Shanghai'd in Shanghai", narrowly missed the British Top 40. The non-album cover of Tomorrow's "My White Bicycle" was a UK Top 20 entry in 1975.

Hair of the Dog, released in April 1975, was produced by Manny Charlton, ending Roger Glover's association with the band. The title track – popularly, though incorrectly, known as "Son of a Bitch" due to its hook lyric – became a staple of 1970s rock radio. The American version of the album included a song originally recorded by the Everly Brothers: the melodic Boudleaux Bryant-penned ballad "Love Hurts". This became a hit in the UK and in the US, where it went platinum. The track became the band's only US Top Ten hit and was also a top 10 hit in nine other countries, reaching number 1 in six of them. The song was on the Norwegian chart for 60 weeks.

In 1979, second guitarist Zal Cleminson (previously of The Sensational Alex Harvey Band) was added to the line-up, remaining for two albums, No Mean City and Malice in Wonderland, and contributing numerous compositions. Malice in Wonderland contained the single "Holiday". In 1981, they contributed the song "Crazy (A Suitable Case for Treatment)" to the soundtrack to the film, Heavy Metal.

Various Nazareth line-ups continued to make studio albums and tour throughout the 1980s and 1990s, although their popularity had declined such that some albums no longer received either a UK or a US release. They remained popular in Europe, particularly Germany, where "Dream On" became a hit single. In 1991, Billy Rankin returned to replace Manny Charlton on the No Jive album, remaining with the band until 1994.

A tribute came in 1993 when Guns N' Roses covered Nazareth's "Hair of the Dog" on "The Spaghetti Incident?"; consolation after they turned down Axl Rose's request for the group to play at his wedding. "Axl really made me more aware of Nazareth…" recalled GNR guitarist Slash, "because he can sing like that McCafferty guy, and really dug his voice. And so I remember listening to Nazareth a lot at one point."

Rankin departed again in 1994, but with Jimmy Murrison and keyboard player Ronnie Leahy, Nazareth maintained a live following in Europe and the US.

Nazareth continued touring after Rankin's departure, with Jimmy Murrison and keyboard player Ronnie Leahy. While on tour in 1999, original drummer Darrell Sweet died at age 51 of a heart attack. He was replaced by bassist Pete Agnew's son Lee for later editions of the band.

On 4 August 2006, John Locke, the former keyboardist of the band, died from cancer at the age of 62.

In February 2008, The Newz was released on the Hamburg-based label, Edel Entertainment. The release of the album coincided with Nazareth's fortieth anniversary tour, which started on 25 January in Sweden and visited most of Europe, finished on 4 November 2008 in Norway. A follow-up album, Big Dogz, was released on 15 April 2011.

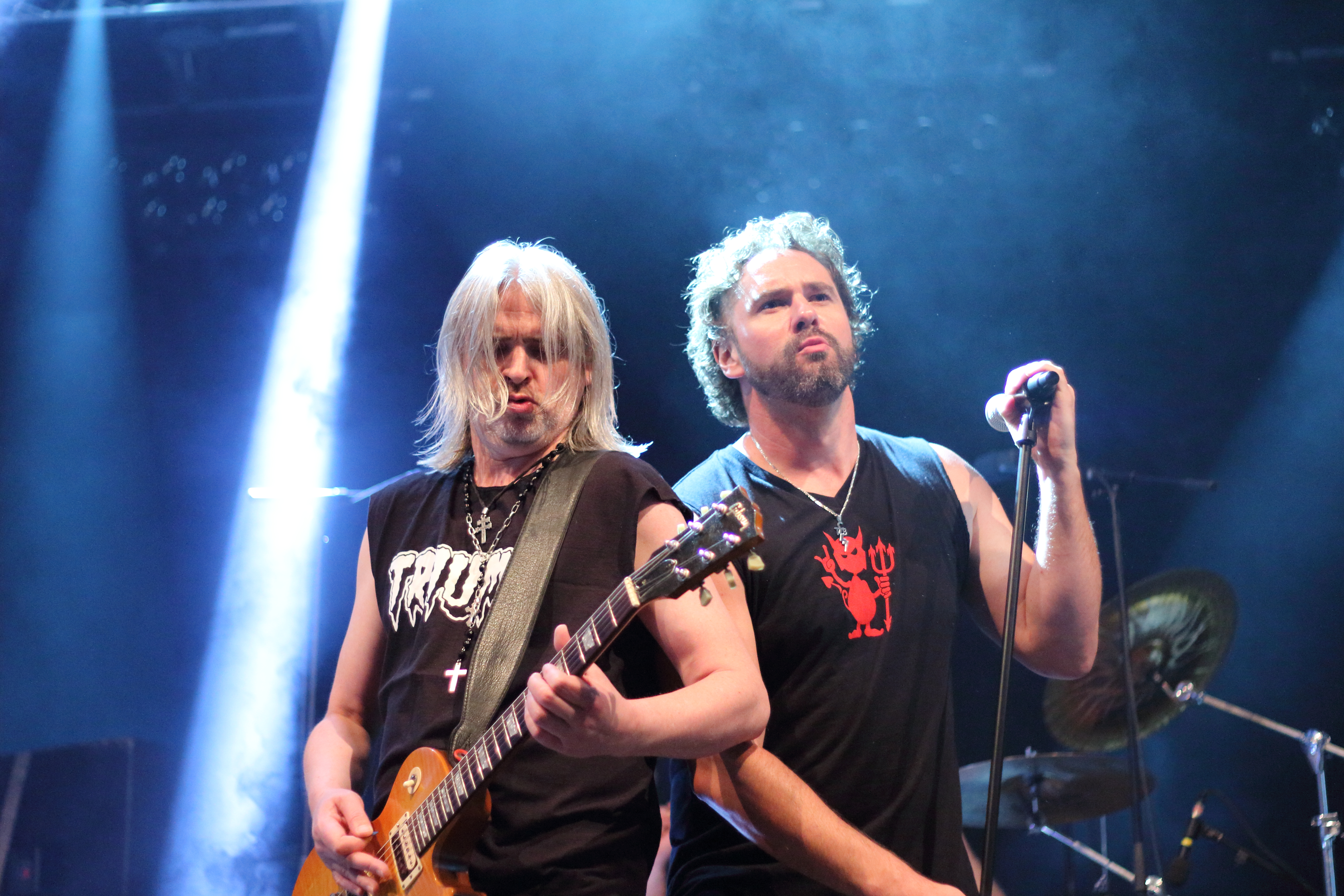
Jimmy Murrison and Linton Osborne at Picture On Festival, August 2014

Nazareth announced McCafferty's retirement from the band due to ill health on 28 August 2013, leaving Pete Agnew as the last remaining original member of the band. On 22 February 2014, it was announced that Scottish singer Linton Osborne was chosen as McCafferty's replacement, with the former singer's blessing. In December 2014, Nazareth announced the cancellation of several shows, and later postponement of their UK tour, due to Osborne contracting a virus that left him unable to perform. In a post on his Facebook page 16 January 2015, Osborne announced his departure from the band.

On 13 February 2015, the band announced that Carl Sentance, formerly of Persian Risk, Geezer Butler Band, and Krokus, was their new lead vocalist.

In October 2018, the album Tattooed on My Brain, was released via Frontiers Records. 'The 50th Anniversary Tour' followed, spanning 2018 and 2019, along with German hard rock band Formosa as support. Original guitarist Manny Charlton died on 5 July 2022, aged 80.

On 8 November 2022, Dan McCafferty died at the age of 76, thus leaving bassist Pete Agnew as the last surviving original member.

In December 2025, Sentance was replaced by the Italian singer Gianni Pontillo. Pontillo made his live debut with the band on 26 February 2026.

== Members ==
=== Current members ===
| Image | Name | Years active | Instruments | Release contributions |
|---|---|---|---|---|
| | Pete Agnew | 1968–present | bass; backing and occasional lead vocals; occasional guitar and piano | all releases |
| | Jimmy Murrison | 1994–present | guitars; backing vocals; occasional piano and keyboards | all releases from Boogaloo (1998) onwards |
| | Lee Agnew | 1999–present | drums; percussion; backing vocals; occasional keyboards | all releases from Boogaloo (1998) onwards |
| | Gianni Pontillo | 2025–present | lead vocals | none to date |

=== Former members ===
| Image | Name | Years active | Instruments | Release contributions |
|---|---|---|---|---|
| | Dan McCafferty | 1968–2013 (died 2022) | lead vocals; occasional bagpipes and talkbox | all releases from Nazareth (1971) to Rock 'n' Roll Telephone (2014) |
| | Darrell Sweet | 1968–1999 (until his death) | drums; percussion; backing vocals | all releases from Nazareth (1971) to Boogaloo (1998); Back to the Trenches (2001); The River Sessions Live 1981 (2004); From the Beginning (2005); Naza' Live Scottish TV 1980 (2005) |
| | Manny Charlton | 1968–1990 (died 2022) | guitars; backing vocals; occasional synthesizers, keyboards and programming | all releases from Nazareth (1971) to BBC Radio 1 Live in Concert (1991); Live at the Beeb (1998); Back to the Trenches (2001); The River Sessions Live 1981 (2004); From the Beginning (2005); Naza' Live Scottish TV 1980 (2005) |
| | Zal Cleminson | 1978–1980 | guitars; occasional synthesizer | No Mean City (1979); Malice in Wonderland (1980); The Fool Circle (1981) one track; Back to the Trenches (2001) |
| | Billy Rankin | 1980–1983; 1990–1994 | guitars; backing vocals; occasional keyboards | 'Snaz (1981); Live in Texas (1981); 2XS (1982); Sound Elixir (1983); No Jive (1991); Move Me (1994); Back to the Trenches (2001); The River Sessions Live 1981 (2004); Naza' Live Scottish TV 1980 (2005) |
| | John Locke | 1980–1982 (died 2006) | keyboards | The Fool Circle (1981); 'Snaz (1981); Live in Texas (1981); 2XS (1982); Back to the Trenches (2001); The River Sessions Live 1981 (2004); Naza' Live Scottish TV 1980 (2005) |
| | Ronnie Leahy | 1994–2002 (session guest 2022) | keyboards | Boogaloo (1998); Homecoming (2002); Homecoming — Greatest Hits Live in Glasgow (2002); Alive & Kicking (2003); Surviving the Law (2022) |
| | Linton Osborne | 2014–2015 | lead vocals | No Means of Escape DVD (2015) |
| | Carl Sentance | 2015–2025 | lead vocals; acoustic guitar | Tattooed on My Brain (2018); Surviving the Law (2022) |

=== Lineups ===
| Period | Members | Releases |
|---|---|---|
| December 1968 – September 1978 | Dan McCafferty – lead vocals; Manny Charlton – guitar, backing vocals; Pete Agnew – bass, backing and occ. lead vocals; Darrell Sweet – drums, backing vocals | Nazareth (1971); Exercises (1972); Razamanaz (1973); Loud 'n' Proud (1973); Rampant (1974); Hair of the Dog (1975); Close Enough for Rock 'n' Roll (1976); Play 'n' the Game (1976); Expect No Mercy (1977); BBC Radio 1 Live in Concert (1991); Live at the Beeb (1998); From the Beginning (2005) |
| September 1978 – July 1980 | Dan McCafferty – lead vocals; Manny Charlton – guitar, backing vocals; Pete Agnew – bass, backing vocals; Darrell Sweet – drums, backing vocals; Zal Cleminson – guitar | No Mean City (1979); Malice in Wonderland (1980); The Fool Circle (1981) one track; Back to the Trenches (2001) |
| July 1980 – Late 1982 | Dan McCafferty – lead vocals; Manny Charlton – guitar, backing vocals; Pete Agnew – bass, backing vocals; Darrell Sweet – drums, backing vocals; Billy Rankin – guitar, backing vocals; John Locke – keyboards | The Fool Circle (1981) without Rankin; 'Snaz (1981); Live in Texas (1981); 2XS (1982); Back to the Trenches (2001); The River Sessions Live 1981 (2004); Naza' Live Scottish TV 1980 (2005) |
| Late 1982 – 1983 | Dan McCafferty – lead vocals; Manny Charlton – guitar, backing vocals; Pete Agnew – bass, backing vocals; Darrell Sweet – drums, backing vocals; Billy Rankin – guitar, backing vocals, keyboards | Sound Elixir (1983); Back to the Trenches (2001) |
| 1983 – May 1990 | Dan McCafferty – lead vocals; Manny Charlton – guitar, backing vocals; Pete Agnew – bass, backing vocals; Darrell Sweet – drums, backing vocals | The Catch (1984); Razamanaz — Live from London (1985); Cinema (1986); Snakes 'n' Ladders (1989); Back to the Trenches (2001) |
| May 1990 – Late 1994 | Dan McCafferty – lead vocals; Pete Agnew – bass, backing vocals; Darrell Sweet – drums, backing vocals; Billy Rankin – guitar, backing vocals | No Jive (1991); Move Me (1994) |
| Late 1994 – April 1999 | Dan McCafferty – lead vocals; Pete Agnew – bass, backing vocals; Darrell Sweet – drums, backing vocals; Jimmy Murrison – guitar, backing vocals; Ronnie Leahy – keyboards | Boogaloo (1998) |
| April 1999 – Late 2002 | Dan McCafferty – lead vocals; Pete Agnew – bass, backing vocals; Jimmy Murrison – guitar, backing vocals; Ronnie Leahy – keyboards; Lee Agnew – drums, backing vocals | Homecoming (2002); Homecoming — Greatest Hits Live in Glasgow (2002); Alive & Kicking (2003) |
| Late 2002 – 2013 | Dan McCafferty – lead vocals; Pete Agnew – bass, backing vocals; Jimmy Murrison – guitar, backing vocals; Lee Agnew – drums, backing vocals | Live from Classic T Stage (2005); Live in Brazil (2007); The Newz (2008); Big Dogz (2011); Rock 'n' Roll Telephone (2014) |
| 2014 – January 2015 | Pete Agnew – bass, backing vocals; Jimmy Murrison – guitar, backing vocals; Lee Agnew – drums, backing vocals; Linton Osborne – lead vocals | No Means of Escape DVD (2015) |
| February 2015 – December 2025 | Pete Agnew – bass, backing and occ. lead vocals; Jimmy Murrison – guitar, backing vocals; Lee Agnew – drums, backing vocals; Carl Sentance – lead vocals | Tattooed on My Brain (2018); Surviving the Law (2022) |
| December 2025 – present | Pete Agnew – bass, backing and occ. lead vocals; Jimmy Murrison – guitar, backing vocals; Lee Agnew – drums, backing vocals; Gianni Pontillo – lead vocals | none to date |

== Discography ==
- Nazareth (1971)
- Exercises (1972)
- Razamanaz (1973)
- Loud 'n' Proud (1973)
- Rampant (1974)
- Hair of the Dog (1975)
- Close Enough for Rock 'n' Roll (1976)
- Play 'n' the Game (1976)
- Expect No Mercy (1977)
- No Mean City (1979)
- Malice in Wonderland (1980)
- The Fool Circle (1981)
- 2XS (1982)
- Sound Elixir (1983)
- The Catch (1984)
- Cinema (1986)
- Snakes 'n' Ladders (1989)
- No Jive (1991)
- Move Me (1994)
- Boogaloo (1998)
- The Newz (2008)
- Big Dogz (2011)
- Rock 'n' Roll Telephone (2014)
- Tattooed on My Brain (2018)
- Surviving the Law (2022)

== See also ==
- Music of Scotland
- List of Scottish musicians
- List of 1970s one-hit wonders in the United States
- List of performers on Top of the Pops
