= This Flight Tonight =

1971 song by Joni Mitchell; a hit for Nazareth

Song by Joni Mitchell

from the album Blue
- Released: 22 June 1971
- Genre: Folk
- Length: 2:51
- Label: Reprise
- Songwriter: Joni Mitchell
- Producer: Joni Mitchell

Official audio
- "This Flight Tonight" on YouTube

"This Flight Tonight" is a song originally by Joni Mitchell, from her 1971 album Blue. Scottish hard rock band Nazareth released the song as a single in 1973 that charted internationally.

== Original recording ==
Joni Mitchell wrote and released the song on her 1971 album Blue. The song tells of Mitchell's regrets as she leaves her lover on a flight and wishes to return. The track was also released as the B-side of "Carey".

Mitchell plays guitar and sings, and was the producer, pedal steel guitar is by Sneaky Pete Kleinow and Henry Lewy was the engineer.

== Nazareth cover ==
"This Flight Tonight"
- Cover of the 1973 German single

Single by Nazareth

from the album Loud 'n' Proud
- B-side: "Called Her Name"
- Released: October 1973
- Genre: Hard rock
- Label: Mooncrest
- Songwriter: Joni Mitchell
- Producer: Roger Glover

Nazareth singles chronology
"Broken Down Angel" (1973)	"This Flight Tonight" (1973)	"Love Hurts" (1974)

Video
- "This Flight Tonight" (Austrian TV, 1975) on YouTube

Scottish hard rock band Nazareth reworked the song in 1973. Their version, a driving hard-rock arrangement, was a hit in Canada, West Germany (where it reached number one) and the UK. It was produced by Roger Glover. The single reached number 11 in the UK Singles Chart in November 1973. The band re-recorded the song in 1991 for the album No Jive.

Writing in The Independent in 2012, Robert Webb said:

The Dunfermline hard-rockers Nazareth loved Blue. You remember them: the gap-toothed vocalist, Dan McCafferty, had hair like a kitchen scourer and a voice to match. They were bad, bad boys. Among the tracks on their 1973 album Loud 'n' Proud, produced by the former Deep Purple bassist Roger Glover, is a taut version of "This Flight". "We used to listen to Joni as we were travelling round in the van," recalls Nazareth's bass-player, Pete Agnew. "'This Flight Tonight' was a big favourite."

Mitchell was impressed with the makeover: "When she was recording at A&M, we were just starting an American tour," explains Agnew. "We all happened to be in the studio the day the single was released, so we were introduced to her and told her what we had done. She said, 'What, with a rock band?'" Joni paid the Scottish band the greatest compliment after "This Flight Tonight" became a worldwide hit for them, touching down at No 11 in the UK. "She was playing a gig in London and told the audience: 'I'd like to open with a Nazareth song'!".

Nancy Wilson revealed that the guitar riff for Nazareth's version of "This Flight Tonight" inspired the riff for the Heart song "Barracuda".

=== Charts ===
==== Weekly charts ====
Chart (1973–1974)	Peak position
Austria (Ö3 Austria Top 40)	2
Canada Top Singles (RPM)	27
Switzerland (Schweizer Hitparade)	5
UK Singles (Official Charts)	11
West Germany (GfK)	1

==== Year-end charts ====
Chart (1974)	Position
Austria (Ö3 Austria Top 40)	4
West Germany (Der Musikmarkt)	11
