= Vigilante Man =

Folk song by Woody Guthrie

Song by Woody Guthrie

from the album Dust Bowl Ballads
- Released: 1940
- Genre: Folk; Americana
- Length: 2:50
- Label: Victor
- Songwriter: Woody Guthrie

"Vigilante Man" is a song by Woody Guthrie, recorded and released in 1940 as one of his Dust Bowl Ballads.

The song is about the hired thugs ("vigilantes") who would violently chase away migrants to California trying to escape the Dust Bowl, a man-made ecological catastrophe in the American Great Plains during the 1930s. One verse refers to the murder of Preacher (Jim) Casy, a central figure in John Steinbecks' 1939 novel The Grapes of Wrath.

The tune was taken from "Sad and Lonesome Day", a song made popular by The Carter Family, which itself borrows from "See That My Grave Is Kept Clean" by Blind Lemon Jefferson.

== Recordings ==
The song has been recorded several times, including:

- 1940 – Woody Guthrie, on the album Dust Bowl Ballads
- 1972 – Ry Cooder, on the album Into the Purple Valley
- 1973 – Nazareth, on the album Razamanaz
- 1988 – Bruce Springsteen, on the album Folkways: A Vision Shared
- 1990 – Hindu Love Gods, on the album Hindu Love Gods
- 2015 – Adriano Viterbini, on the album Film O Sound
