= Love Hurts =

1960 song written by Boudleaux Bryant

- West German release picture sleeve

Song by the Everly Brothers

from the album A Date with the Everly Brothers
- Published: August 30, 1960 by Acuff-Rose Publications, Inc.
- Released: October 1960
- Recorded: July 1960
- Genre: Country
- Length: 2:22
- Label: Warner Bros. Nashville
- Songwriter: Boudleaux Bryant

Audio video
- "Love Hurts (2007 Remaster)" on YouTube

"Love Hurts" is a song written and composed by the American songwriter Boudleaux Bryant. First recorded by The Everly Brothers in July 1960, the song is best known in two hit versions by UK artists: by the Scottish hard rock band Nazareth for their 1975 LP Hair of the Dog and by the English singer-songwriter Jim Capaldi in 1975.

== Original version by the Everly Brothers ==
The song was introduced in October 1960 as an album track on A Date with the Everly Brothers but was never released as a single (A-side or B-side) by the Everlys. A falling out with their manager and publisher, Wesley Rose, prevented them from issuing it as a single, though it had been meant for them. It was after the quarrel was settled in 1964 that they rerecorded it for the 1965 album Rock 'n' Soul.

== Roy Orbison version ==
"Love Hurts"
- US picture sleeve

Single by Roy Orbison

from the album Crying
- A-side: "Running Scared"
- Released: March 1961
- Recorded: February 27, 1961
- Studio: RCA Victor Studio B, Nashville
- Genre: Pop
- Length: 2:26
- Label: Monument
- Songwriter: Boudleaux Bryant
- Producer: Fred Foster

Audio video
- "Love Hurts" on YouTube

Roy Orbison covered "Love Hurts" in 1961 and issued it as the B-side to "Running Scared." While "Running Scared" was an international hit, the B-side only picked up significant airplay in Australia. Consequently, chart figures for Australia show "Running Scared"/"Love Hurts" as a double A-Side, both sides peaking at No. 5. This makes Orbison's recording of "Love Hurts" the first version to be a hit.

Chart (1961)	Peak position
Australia	5

== Nazareth version ==
"Love Hurts"
- Netherlands single sleeve

Single by Nazareth

from the album Hair of the Dog
- B-side: "Down" (non-U.S.); "Hair of the Dog" (U.S.)
- Released: November 8, 1975
- Genre: Blues rock; hard rock; AOR
- Length: 3:53; 3:03 (U.S. single)
- Label: Mooncrest (UK); Vertigo (Europe); A&M (US/Canada)
- Songwriter: Boudleaux Bryant
- Producer: Manny Charlton

Nazareth singles chronology
"This Flight Tonight" (1973)	"Love Hurts" (1975)	"Shanghai'd in Shanghai" (1974)

Audio video
- "Love Hurts (Single Edit)" on YouTube

Performed as a power ballad, the Nazareth version is the most popular version of the song and the only rendition of "Love Hurts" to become a hit single in the United States, reaching No. 8 on the Billboard Hot 100 in early 1976. Billboard ranked it as the No. 23 song for 1976. As part of the "Hot Tracks" EP it also reached No. 15 in the UK in 1977. Nazareth's version was an international hit, peaking at No. 1 in Canada, the Netherlands, Belgium, South Africa and Norway. The Nazareth single was so successful in Norway that it charted for 61 weeks on the Norwegian charts (VG-lista Top 10), including 14 weeks at No. 1, making it the top single of all time in that country.

A later recording by Nazareth, featuring the Munich Philharmonic Orchestra, peaked at No. 89 in Germany in 1994.

The lyrics of the song were changed for Nazareth's 1975 album, where the original line "love is like a stove/it burns you when it's hot" was changed to "love is like a flame/it burns you when it's hot".

=== Charts and certifications ===
==== Weekly charts ====
Chart (1975–1977)	Peak position
Argentina	3
Australia (Kent Music Report)	8
Austria (Ö3 Austria Top 40)	11
Belgium (Ultratop 50 Flanders)	1
Belgium (Ultratop 50 Wallonia)	28
Canada Top Singles (RPM)	1
Netherlands (Single Top 100)	1
New Zealand (Recorded Music NZ)	4
Norway (VG-lista)	1
South Africa (Springbok Radio)	1
Sweden (Sverigetopplistan)	6
UK Singles (Official Charts)	41
US Billboard Hot 100	8
West Germany (GfK)	30

==== Year-end charts ====
Chart (1975)	Rank
South African Singles Chart	3

Chart (1976)	Rank
Australia (Kent Music Report)	45
Belgian BRT Top 30	10
Canadian RPM Top 200 Singles	14
Dutch Top 40	3
US Billboard Hot 100	23

==== All-time chart ====
Chart	Rank
Norway	1

==== Certifications ====
Region	Certification	Certified units/sales
Brazil (Pro-Música Brasil)	Gold	100,000^{*}
Canada (Music Canada)	Platinum	150,000^{^}
United States (RIAA)	Gold	1,000,000^{^}
^{*} Sales figures based on certification alone.^{^} Shipments figures based on certification alone.

=== In media ===
Nazareth's version was used in an advertisement for Esurance, and also in a series of advertisements by Zurich. The song was featured in Rob Zombie's remake of Halloween. A cover of the song by Canadian singer Nan Vernon was featured in the credits of its sequel, Halloween II.

== Jim Capaldi version ==
"Love Hurts"

Single by Jim Capaldi

from the album Short Cut Draw Blood
- B-side: "Sugar Honey"
- Released: November 1975
- Recorded: 1975
- Genre: Pop
- Length: 3:29
- Label: Island
- Songwriter: Boudleaux Bryant
- Producer: Steve Smith

Jim Capaldi singles chronology
"It's All Up to You" (1974)	"Love Hurts" (1975)	"Goodbye Love" (1976)

Audio video
- "Love Hurts" on YouTube

Jim Capaldi reached number 4 in the UK charts with his interpretation of "Love Hurts" in November 1975, which was to prove his highest-charting UK single. Described by Rolling Stone as having "a sense of pain very different from Roy Orbison's", the single also charted in the US, West Germany, and Sweden. Capaldi's version features his former Traffic bandmates Steve Winwood and Rosko Gee on piano and bass respectively.

=== Personnel ===
- Jim Capaldi - vocals
- Chris Spedding - guitar
- Steve Winwood - piano
- Jean Roussel - electric piano, minimoog
- Rosko Gee - bass
- Gerry Conway - drums
- Ray Allen - percussion
- Harry Robinson - string arrangements

=== Weekly charts ===
Chart (1975–1976)	Peak position
Australia (Kent Music Report)	6
Canada Top Singles (RPM)	15
Ireland (IRMA)	8
South Africa (Springbok)	13
Sweden	16
UK	4
US	97
West Germany	42

=== Year-end charts ===
Chart (1976)	Position
Australia (Kent Music Report)	31
Canada RPM	137

== Cher version ==
"Love Hurts"

Single by Cher

from the album Love Hurts
- B-side: "One Small Step"
- Released: November 25, 1991
- Length: 4:07
- Label: Geffen
- Songwriter: Boudleaux Bryant
- Producer: Richie Zito

Cher singles chronology
"Save Up All Your Tears" (1991)	"Love Hurts" (1991)	"Could've Been You" (1992)

Audio video
- "Love Hurts" on YouTube

American singer Cher recorded her first version in 1975 for the album Stars but did not release this version as a single. She later recorded a second version in 1991 for her album of the same name (1991). This version was a cover of Nazareth's version. The single became a minor hit in the UK in December 1991.

=== Track listings ===
- European 7-inch and cassette single
1. "Love Hurts" – 4:19
2. "One Small Step" – 3:27
- European 12-inch and CD single
1. "Love Hurts" – 4:19
2. "One Small Step" – 3:27
3. "Just Like Jesse James" – 4:06

=== Charts ===
Chart (1991)	Peak position
UK Singles (Official Charts)	43
UK Airplay (Music Week)	39

== See also ==
- List of 1970s one-hit wonders in the United States
