= Manny Charlton =

Scottish musician (1941–2022)

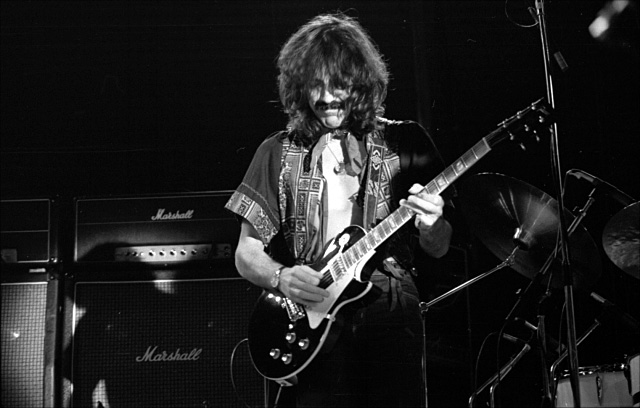
- Charlton in 1976

Background information
- Born: Manuel Charlton; 25 July 1941; La Línea, Cádiz, Spain
- Origin: Dunfermline, Fife, Scotland
- Died: 5 July 2022 (aged 80) Texas, U.S.
- Genres: Hard rock; heavy metal; blues rock; boogie rock
- Occupations: Musician; record producer
- Years active: 1958–2022
- Formerly of: Nazareth
- Website: mannycharltonband.com

Manuel Charlton (25 July 1941 – 5 July 2022) was a Scottish musician, record producer and founding member of the Scottish hard rock band Nazareth. He was the band's lead guitarist from 1968 to 1990. He also produced Nazareth albums in the 1970s, including Hair of the Dog.

== Career ==
=== Nazareth ===
Charlton was born in La Línea on 25 July 1941. His family emigrated from Spain to Scotland and settled in Dunfermline when he was two. Prior to joining Nazareth, he played in a few bands, most notably the Mark 5 and later the Red Hawks, until joining the local semi-pro Dunfermline band The Shadettes. In 1968, the band changed their name to Nazareth, inspired by the opening lyric from "The Weight", a song by The Band.

Charlton's bluesy style of playing, combined with Dan McCafferty's vocals, first came to the attention of wider rock audiences when Nazareth toured in 1971 as the opening act for Deep Purple. By 1973 they were headlining their own shows. Charlton was also the band's producer for many years, succeeding Deep Purple's Roger Glover, after the band decided they wanted to move in a new direction for the Hair of the Dog album. Hair of the Dog attained platinum sales in the United States and has to date sold in excess of two million copies. It contains their biggest hit "Love Hurts" which reached No. 8 in the United States.

Charlton also produced the self-titled Dan McCafferty debut LP in 1975, with a single "Out of Time" (1975) reaching # 41 in the UK chart. He went on to produce the Nazareth albums up to and including No Mean City (1979).

=== Appetite For Destruction (Guns N' Roses) ===
Axl Rose of Guns N' Roses initially wanted "the guy who produced Nazareth's Hair of the Dog" to produce what would become the band's breakthrough album. Charlton got the request from Geffen Records and produced several recordings at Sound City Studios (Los Angeles) in June 1986. At the end of the session they had 25 songs on tape, including "Paradise City", "Rocket Queen", "Welcome to the Jungle", "Nightrain", two versions of "Move to the City", "November Rain", "Shadow of your Love" (takes one and two), and "Reckless Life". After this initial work, he rejoined Nazareth in Europe, and Guns N' Roses hired Mike Clink to produce the album. Charlton's productions are included as bonuses on the 2018 reissue of Appetite for Destruction.

=== Exit from Nazareth ===
After leaving Nazareth in 1990, Charlton played some solo shows on the Scottish club circuit, and released his first solo album Drool in 1997, on the Red Steel record label with Neil Miller on vocals. The following year, he relocated to Texas, where he formed the Manny Charlton Band (MCB). The new band released a pair of albums – Stonkin and Klone This – before disbanding in 2003.

=== Doom ===
In 1995, Charlton sent to id Software, creator of Doom, a cassette tape featuring an untitled song that John Romero would later title "Blood on the Walls". The liner said, "For all the guys and gals at I.D. (sic) who came up with the coolest game this side of hell, kick some demon butt to this!!" It also said "distribute as shareware". The song is actually titled "Doom" from Charlton's album Drool.

=== Solo career ===
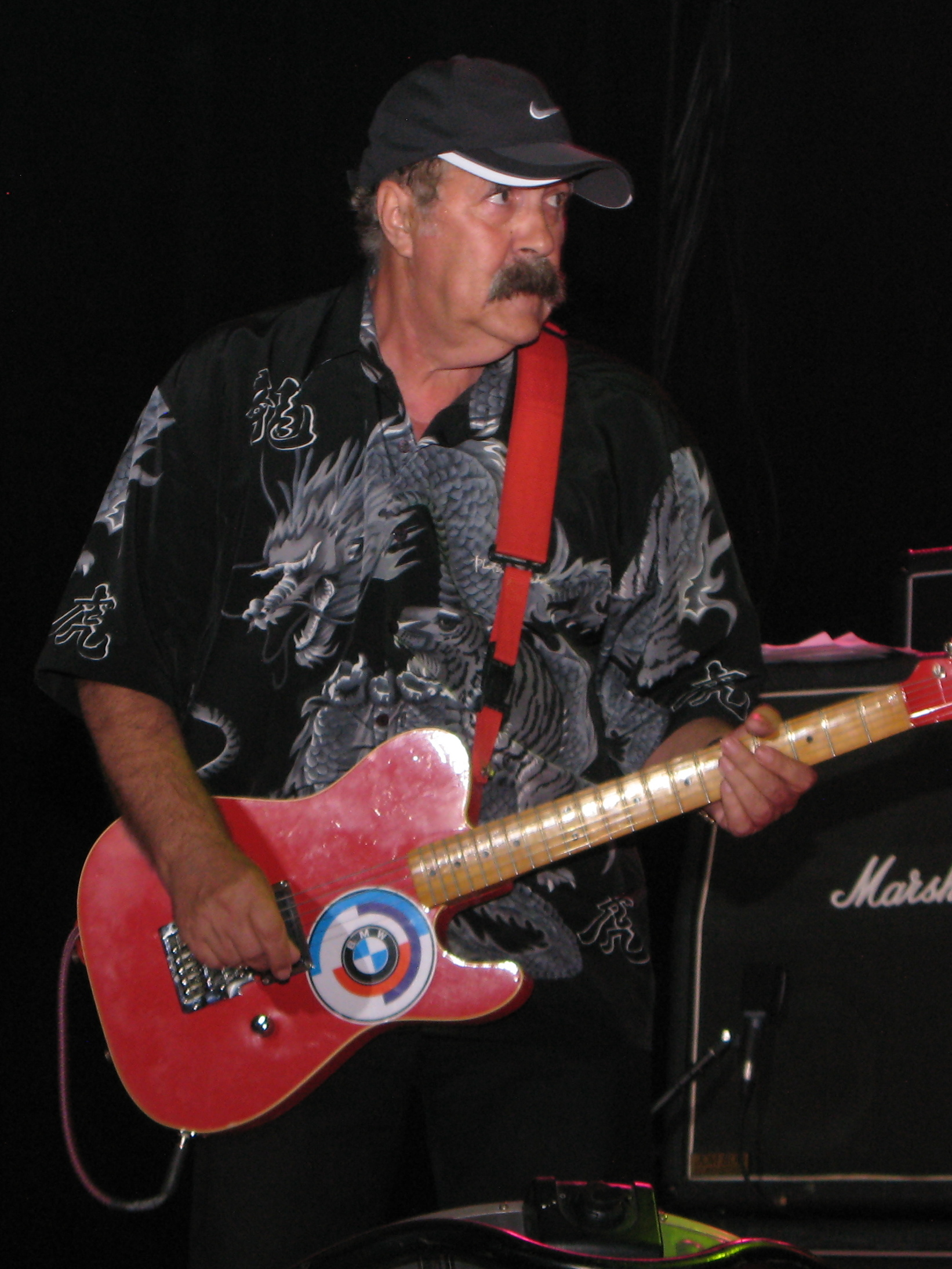
Charlton performing in 2008

In 2004, Charlton released Say The Word on the Scottish label River Records. 2005 saw the release of Sharp, which is on the whole a covers album, including Tim Hardin's "Hang On To A Dream" and Bob Dylan's "Shelter from the Storm". Later that same year, Charlton completed the follow-up to Sharp, titled Sharp Re-Loaded.

In early 2006, Charlton joined the Swedish rock band From Behind, who released their debut album titled Game Over, and toured in support of the album around Europe before disbanding in late 2007. The lead singer of the band was Nicky Moore, former member of Samson. Charlton then released a solo album Americana Deluxe, covering songs such as Fleetwood Mac's "Tusk".

In March 2013, Charlton released Hellacious co-produced by Gary Bryant (GB Records). This recording was made in California and featured Tim Bogert, Walfredo Reyes, Jr., Steven Adler, Vivian Campbell, and Robin DeLorenzo.

In 2014, Charlton's solo albums Sharp and Sharp Re-Loaded were issued as a double CD. Neil Jefferies of Classic Rock commended Charlton's production work, writing: "Among three Dylan songs tackled, 'All Along The Watchtower' is simply stunning, sidestepping both the original and Hendrix’s seminal version with quasi-reggae tones that cement Charlton’s reputation as a truly gifted arranger." In 2018, Atom Records released Créme De La Créme, an album celebrating the 'Best Of' Charlton's solo career.

== Personal life ==
Charlton was married to a woman named Isabel, whom he later divorced. They had a son and daughter together, Tony and Vicky. In 1997, he moved to Texas, where he married his second wife Julie. He relocated again to Córdoba (Spain) in 2015.

== Death ==
During a visit back to Texas, Charlton died on 5 July 2022 at the age of 80. His son had died six months earlier.

== Discography ==
- Nazareth (1971)
- Exercises (1972)
- Razamanaz (1973)
- Loud 'n' Proud (1973)
- Rampant (1974)
- Hair of the Dog (1975)
- Close Enough for Rock 'n' Roll (1976)
- Play 'n' the Game (1976)
- Expect No Mercy (1977)
- No Mean City (1979)
- Malice in Wonderland (1980)
- The Fool Circle (1981)
- 2XS (1982)
- Sound Elixir (1983)
- The Catch (1984)
- Cinema (1986)
- Snakes 'n' Ladders (1989)

=== Solo ===
- Manny Charlton – Drool (1999)
- Manny Charlton – Bravado (2000)
- Manny Charlton Band – Stonkin' (2002)
- Manny Charlton Band – Klone This (2003)
- Manny Charlton – Say The Word (2004)
- Manny Charlton – Sharp (2004)
- Manny Charlton – Sharp Re-Loaded (2005)
- From Behind – Game Over (2006)
- Manny Charlton – Americana Deluxe (2007)
- Manny Charlton – Then There's This (2008)
- Manny Charlton Band – Hellacious (2013)
- Manny Charlton – Sharp / Sharp Re-Loaded (2CD Reissue) (2014)
- Manny Charlton – Solo (2016)
- Manny Charlton – Creme de la Creme – a Best Of (2018)

=== Singles ===
- Manny Charlton Band – "It Does Something" (2012)

=== ROIO ===
- Nazareth with Manny Charlton – Rock ‘N’ Roll Resort (Live) (2008)

=== Contributions ===
- Dan McCafferty – Dan McCafferty (1975).
- Marseille – Red, White and Slightly Blue (1977)
- Streetheart – Under Heaven Over Hell (1978)
- Streetheart – Under My Thumb (EP) (1979)
- Streetheart – Quicksand shoes (1980)
- Vic Vergat – Walk away Renee (1980) (single)
- Guns N Roses – Appetite For Destruction (1986) – pre-production
- Jingo De Lunch – B.Y.E (1992)
- Various Artists – A Tribute To Led Zeppelin (2008)
- Robin DeLorenzo – Walkin' Miles in My Shoes (2014)
- The Fluffy Jackets – Fighting Demons (2014)
- The Mighty Mojos – Mojo Rising (EP) (2015)
- Billy Craig – Another Lazy Day (2015)
- Salem – "Tank" on the album Dark Days (2016)
- The Fluffy Jackets feat. Manny Charlton – Something from Nothing (CD + DVD) (2019)
- Joecephus And The George Jonestown Massacre – Heirs Of The Dog (2021) – guitar on "Changing Times"
