= Mooncrest Records =

UK record label

Mooncrest Records is a British record label that was founded in 1970, originally as a management company run by Tony Stratton-Smith of Charisma Records, and it started to release singles in 1973. The first single released on the label (and given the catalogue number MOON 1), "Broken Down Angel" by Nazareth, reached the top 10 of the UK singles charts in May 1973. The label's biggest charting success was The Hotshots' version of "Snoopy vs the Red Baron", which reached no. 4 two months later. The label was sold to Trojan Records in 1975, and via Trojan to the Sanctuary Group in 2001, and has had an intermittent history since the seventies.

The label re-issued some earlier albums (such as Shirley Collins' (No Roses) (1971), and Iain Matthews' (Journeys from Gospel Oak) (1972)), and then issued new albums by Nazareth (1973–75), Shakin' Stevens (Jungle Rock) (1976) and Alan Hull (Back to Basics) (1994). More recently they have handled Fairport Convention and Michael Chapman. The albums use the word "Crest" and the singles use the word "Moon" in their number. One single they issued was by Blessings in Disguise (Noddy Holder and Dave Hill from Slade), with their cover of "Crying in the Rain", in 1989. They tended to specialise in UK folk-rock and singer-songwriters.
