= Dan McCafferty =

Scottish singer and songwriter (1946–2022)

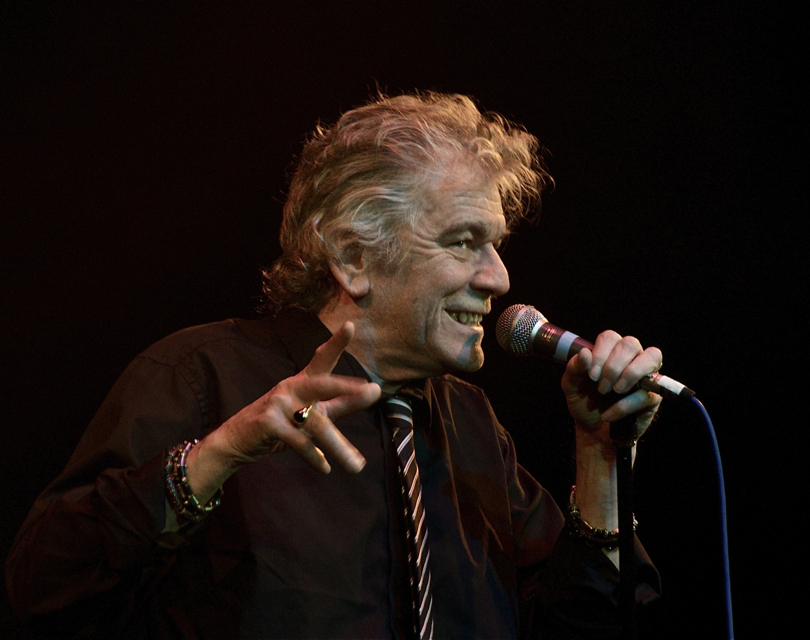
- McCafferty in 2010

Background information
- Born: William Daniel McCafferty; 14 October 1946; Dunfermline, Fife, Scotland
- Died: 8 November 2022 (aged 76) Scotland
- Genres: Hard rock; heavy metal; blues rock; rock and roll
- Occupations: Singer-songwriter; musician
- Instruments: Vocals; bagpipes
- Years active: 1961–2022

William Daniel McCafferty (14 October 1946 – 8 November 2022) was a Scottish vocalist and songwriter best known as the lead singer for the Scottish hard rock band Nazareth from its founding in 1968 to his retirement from touring with the band in 2013.

== Life and career ==
=== Nazareth and solo career ===
Under the influence of artists such as Little Richard, Elvis Presley, Chuck Berry and Otis Redding, he became one of the founding members of Nazareth in 1968. He appeared on all of Nazareth's albums up to 2014 and toured with them for 45 years. He co-wrote some of the big Nazareth hits, including "Broken Down Angel", and "Bad Bad Boy". He released three solo albums. In September 1975, his first solo single, a cover of The Rolling Stones 1966 song "Out of Time" peaked at number 41 in the UK.

=== Retirement from touring with Nazareth ===
On 29 August 2013, Nazareth announced McCafferty's retirement from touring with the band due to health issues. He elaborated on the specifics of the health issues and the state of his situation in an interview with the UK music magazine, Classic Rock. He stated that he had not suffered a stroke as had been reported in the press. He said that his chronic obstructive pulmonary disease (COPD) that has "worsened in recent years" had made him leave the stage in Switzerland in late August 2013 after only three songs, indicating that, "You don’t know when it's going to come on, but suddenly you can't breathe." Commenting about his most recent episode, at the Swiss festival, McCafferty maintained, "if you can't do the job you shouldn't be there — Nazareth's too big for that." McCafferty also revealed that another health problem was responsible for his onstage collapse at a concert in Canada in July 2013 – a burst stomach ulcer.

Although McCafferty retired from performing, Nazareth fans can still hear his voice on their 2014 album Rock 'n' Roll Telephone. The singer also revealed that he could record more new music, either with Nazareth or as a solo artist. He clarified: "To go into a studio and sing isn't like doing a gig. I could always make another record, but getting up to do an hour and three-quarters, and get people to pay money to come and see me — I can't do that." McCafferty expressed his appreciation to his fans near the end of the interview by saying: "Let everyone know I appreciate they've been there for all these years."

=== Semi-retired works ===
McCafferty continued to perform around the world and to record on occasion. On 21 June 2019, he released a new music video, titled "Tell Me", from his solo album Last Testament, issued in October of that year. It was his first solo record since 1987's Into the Ring.

== Personal life and death ==
McCafferty was born in Dunfermline, Fife. McCafferty was married and had two children.

McCafferty suffered from chronic obstructive pulmonary disease (COPD) and died on 8 November 2022, at the age of 76. Tributes were paid by rock musicians Brian Johnson and Axl Rose, both of whom mentioned him as an influence on their own singing.

== Discography ==
=== Solo discography ===
==== Albums ====
- Dan McCafferty (1975)
- Into the Ring (1987)
- Last Testament (2019)
- No Turning Back (2023)

==== Singles ====
- "Out of Time" (1975) # 41 UK
- "Watcha Gonna Do About It" (1975)
- "The Honky Tonk Downstairs" (1976)
- "Stay With Me Baby" (1978)
- "Starry Eyes" (1987)
- "Tell Me" (2019)
