= Malmquist =

Malmquist is a Swedish surname, which means "ore-branch". Alternative spellings include Malmqvist and Malmkvist. The name may refer to:

- Axel Johannes Malmquist (1882–1952), Swedish mathematician
- Göran Malmqvist (1924–2019), Swedish linguist
- Gunnar Malmquist (1893–1982), Swedish astronomer
- Linus Malmqvist (born 1981), Swedish football player
- Robin Malmkvist (born 1987), Swedish football player
- Siw Malmkvist (born 1936), Swedish singer
- Sten Malmquist (1917–2004), Swedish economist
- Tom Malmquist (born 1978), Swedish writer
- Walter Malmquist (born 1956), American skier

== Other uses ==
- 1527 Malmquista, a main-belt asteroid
- Malmquist bias, in observational astronomy
- Malmquist index, to compare the production technology of two economies
- Malmquist's theorem in differential equations
