= Hod =

Hod or HOD may refer to:

- Brick hod, a long-handled box for carrying bricks or mortar
- Coal scuttle, bucket-like container for carrying coal
- Hawk (plasterer's tool), used to hold plaster
- a container used to hold clams when clam digging

== Places ==
- Hod Hill, an archaeological site in Dorset, England
- Hod HaSharon, city in the Center District of Israel
- Hollinwood railway station, England
- Hodeida International Airport, in Yemen

=== Fictional locations ===
- Hod, an ancient city mentioned in Tales of the Abyss.

== People ==
- Henry Omaga-Diaz (born 1961), Filipino journalist
- Hod Eller (1894–1961), American baseball player
- Hod Fenner (1897–1954), American baseball player
- Hod Ford (1897–1977), American baseball player
- Hod Kibbie (1903–1975), American baseball player
- Hod Leverette (1889–1958), American baseball player
- Hod Lipson (born 1967), American engineer
- Hod Lisenbee (1898–1987), American baseball player
- Hod O'Brien (born 1936), American jazz pianist
- Hod Stuart (1879–1907), Canadian hockey player
- Nir Hod (born 1970), Israeli-American artist

== Religion ==
- Höðr, a god in Norse mythology

=== Judaism ===
- Hod (Kabbalah), part of the Tree of Life
- Hod (organization), an Israel-based organization for Jewish homosexuals
- Halachic Organ Donor Society, an Israeli medical organization

== Arts, entertainment, media ==
- Castlevania: Harmony of Dissonance, 2002 Game Boy Advance game

== Biology, medicine ==
- Histogram of oriented displacements, descriptor for 2D trajectories intended for describing trajectories of human joints
- Hypertrophic osteodystrophy, a bone disease in young dogs
- Outpatient clinic (hospital department), Hospital Outpatient Department

== Other uses ==
- Halo occupation distribution in cosmology and astrophysics
- Hereditarily ordinal definable, in set theory
- Heritage Open Days, annual UK event
- Hodiernal tense, grammatical term
- Holma language, spoken in Nigeria
- Hydrogen on demand, generating hydrogen for a fuel cell or internal combustion engine instantly when needed
- IBM Websphere Host On-Demand, a software from IBM

== See also ==
- Hodd (disambiguation)
- HOTD including HotD
