= HOTD =

HOTD, HotD, may refer to:

- Hair of the Dog (disambiguation)
- Highschool of the Dead, an anime and manga series
- The House of the Dead (disambiguation)
- House of the Dragon, an HBO live-action high fantasy TV series
- H.O.T.D., 2010 album by Maon Kurosaki

== See also ==
- hotdog
- HOD (disambiguation)
