= 1059 Mussorgskia =

Background asteroid

Discovery
- Discovered by: V. Albitzkij
- Discovery site: Simeiz Obs.
- Discovery date: 19 July 1925

Designations
- Pronunciation: /mʊˈsɔːrkskiə/
- Named after: Modest Mussorgsky (Russian composer)
- Alternative designations: 1925 OA · A916 KA; A917 UC · A920 HA
- Minor planet category: main-belt · (middle) background

Orbital characteristics
- Epoch 23 March 2018 (JD 2458200.5)
- Uncertainty parameter 0
- Observation arc: 97.85 yr (35,739 d)
- Aphelion: 3.1377 AU
- Perihelion: 2.1435 AU
- Semi-major axis: 2.6406 AU
- Eccentricity: 0.1882
- Orbital period (sidereal): 4.29 yr (1,567 d)
- Mean anomaly: 216.68°
- Mean motion: 0° 13^{m} 46.92^{s} / day
- Inclination: 10.097°
- Longitude of ascending node: 200.37°
- Argument of perihelion: 88.072°

Physical characteristics
- Mean diameter: 17.54±3.33 km 23.10±0.32 km 25.227±0.139 km 30.323±0.250 km 36.78 km (calculated)
- Synodic rotation period: 5.519±0.002 h 5.636 h 5.6362±0.0006 h
- Geometric albedo: 0.057 (assumed); 0.1010±0.0088; 0.174±0.026; 0.177±0.006; 0.23±0.21
- Spectral type: X · C (SDSS-MFB) (Note: Search for Unusual Spectroscopic Candidates Among 40313 minor planets from the 3rd Release of the Sloan Digital Sky Survey Moving Object Catalog (publication). SDSS-MFB (Masi Foglia Binzel) taxonomy (catalog).)
- Absolute magnitude (H): 10.70 · 10.84±0.24; 10.9 · 11.04

1059 Mussorgskia, provisional designation 1925 OA, is a background asteroid from the central regions of the asteroid belt, approximately 25 kilometers (16 miles) in diameter. It was discovered on 19 July 1925, by Soviet astronomer Vladimir Albitsky at the Simeiz Observatory on the Crimean peninsula. The asteroid was named for Russian composer Modest Mussorgsky. The X- or C-type asteroid has a rotation period of 5.636 hours.

== Orbit and classification ==
Mussorgskia is a non-family asteroid from the main belt's background population. It orbits the Sun in the central asteroid belt at a distance of 2.1–3.1 AU once every 4 years and 3 months (1,567 days; semi-major axis of 2.64 AU). Its orbit has an eccentricity of 0.19 and an inclination of 10° with respect to the ecliptic.

The asteroid was first observed as A916 KA at Simeiz in May 1916. The body's observation arc begins as 1920 HA at Heidelberg Observatory in April 1920, or more than 5 years prior to its official discovery observation at Simeiz.

== Physical characteristics ==
Mussorgskia has been characterized as a common X-type asteroid by Pan-STARRS' photometric survey. It is also characterized as a carbonaceous C-type asteroid in the SDSS-MFB (Masi Foglia Binzel) taxonomy.

=== Rotation period ===
In May 2002, two rotational lightcurves of Mussorgskia were obtained from photometric observations by Stephen Brincat at the Flarestar Observatory in Malta and by French amateur astronomer René Roy. Lightcurve analysis gave a rotation period of 5.519 and 5.6362 hours with a brightness amplitude of 0.20 and 0.21 magnitude, respectively (U=2/3). The Collaborative Asteroid Lightcurve Link adopts a period of 5.636 hours and a brightness variation between 0.2 and 0.21 magnitude (U=3).

=== Diameter and albedo ===
According to the surveys carried out by the Japanese Akari satellite and the NEOWISE mission of NASA's Wide-field Infrared Survey Explorer, Mussorgskia measures between 17.54 and 30.323 kilometers in diameter and its surface has an albedo between 0.1010 and 0.23.

CALL assumes a standard albedo for carbonaceous asteroids of 0.057 and consequently calculates a larger diameter of 36.78 kilometers based on an absolute magnitude of 10.9.

== Naming ==
This minor planet was named after Russian composer Modest Mussorgsky (1839–1881). The official naming citation was published by the Minor Planet Center in November 1952 (M.P.C. 837).
