= Hodd =

Hodd may refer to:

- Andrew Hodd, an English cricketer
- IL Hødd, a sports club in Norway
- Hodd, a 2009 book by Adam Thorpe
- Hodd Hill, a fort in Blackmore Vale
- Norman Hodd, an archdeacon of Blackburn

== See also ==
- Hod (disambiguation)
- Dennis Roy Hodds
