= 1783 Albitskij =

Asteroid

Discovery
- Discovered by: G. Neujmin
- Discovery site: Simeiz Obs.
- Discovery date: 24 March 1935

Designations
- Named after: Vladimir Albitzky (Soviet/Russian astronomer)
- Alternative designations: 1935 FJ · 1933 TB; 1952 BP_{1} · 1952 DP; 1970 GA_{1}
- Minor planet category: main-belt · (middle); Eunomia · Adeona

Orbital characteristics
- Epoch 4 September 2017 (JD 2458000.5)
- Uncertainty parameter 0
- Observation arc: 82.12 yr (29,993 days)
- Aphelion: 3.0132 AU
- Perihelion: 2.3124 AU
- Semi-major axis: 2.6628 AU
- Eccentricity: 0.1316
- Orbital period (sidereal): 4.35 yr (1,587 days)
- Mean anomaly: 23.419°
- Mean motion: 0° 13^{m} 36.48^{s} / day
- Inclination: 11.506°
- Longitude of ascending node: 189.51°
- Argument of perihelion: 315.93°

Physical characteristics
- Dimensions: 20.47±6.78 km 21.34 km (derived); 21.36±2.4 km (IRAS:3); 24.268±0.093 km 24.64±7.83 km 24.68±0.76 km 25.642±0.178 km
- Synodic rotation period: 12 h
- Geometric albedo: 0.033±0.003; 0.051±0.048; 0.0546±0.0091; 0.057±0.004; 0.06±0.07; 0.0706 (derived); 0.0738±0.019 (IRAS:3)
- Spectral type: SMASS = Ch · C
- Absolute magnitude (H): 11.80 · 11.85 · 11.90 · 12.0 · 12.01 · 12.14±0.00

1783 Albitskij, provisional designation 1935 FJ, is a carbonaceous Adeonian asteroid from the middle region of the asteroid belt, approximately 22 kilometers in diameter. It was discovered on 24 March 1935, by Georgian–Russian astronomer Grigory Neujmin at the Simeiz Observatory on the Crimean peninsula. The asteroid was named after Soviet astronomer Vladimir Albitzky.

== Orbit and classification ==
Albitskij is a member of the Adeona family (505), a large family of carbonaceous asteroids, when applying the Hierarchical Clustering Method to its proper orbital elements. It has also been dynamically classified as a member of the Eunomia family (as many other members of the Adeona family), which can be ruled out, due to the fact, that this family consist of stony rather than carbonaceous asteroid.

The asteroid orbits the Sun in the central main belt at a distance of 2.3–3.0 AU once every 4 years and 4 months (1,587 days). Its orbit has an eccentricity of 0.13 and an inclination of 12° with respect to the ecliptic.

In 1933, it was first identified as 1933 TB at the U.S. Oak Ridge Observatory in Massachusetts, two years prior to its discovery. The body's observation arc begins one month after its official discovery with the first used observation made at Uccle Observatory in Belgium.

== Physical characteristics ==
In the SMASS taxonomic scheme, Albitskij is a Ch-subtype, a hydrated C-type asteroid. It has also been characterized as a common carbonaceous C-type by Pan-STARRS photometric survey. This agrees with the overall spectral type of the Adeona family (505).

=== Rotation period ===
Published by Cláudia Angeli and Maria Barucci, a rotational lightcurve was obtained for this asteroid from photometric observations made at the French Haute-Provence and Pic du Midi observatories by astronomers at Meudon in the early 1990s. It gave a rotation period of 12 hours with a brightness amplitude of 0.4 magnitude (U=2).

=== Diameter and albedo ===
According to the surveys carried out by the Infrared Astronomical Satellite IRAS, the Japanese Akari satellite and NASA's Wide-field Infrared Survey Explorer with its subsequent NEOWISE mission, Albitskij measures between 20.47 and 25.6 kilometers in diameter and its surface has an albedo between 0.03 and 0.07.

The Collaborative Asteroid Lightcurve Link agrees with the results obtained by IRAS and derives an albedo of 0.07 and a diameter of 21.3 kilometers, based on an absolute magnitude of 11.85.

== Naming ==
This minor planet is named after Soviet astronomer, discoverer of minor planets and head of Simeiz Observatory, Vladimir Albitzky (1891–1952). His research included variable stars and the measurement of radial velocities. The official naming citation was published by the Minor Planet Center on 1 June 1980 (M.P.C. 5357).
