= 1283 Komsomolia =

Main-belt asteroid

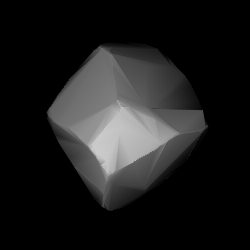
- Modelled shape of Komsomolia

Discovery
- Discovered by: V. Albitzkij
- Discovery site: Simeiz Obs.
- Discovery date: 25 September 1925

Designations
- Named after: Komsomol (USSR youth organization)
- Alternative designations: 1925 SC · 1931 VE_{1} 1951 EO_{2} · 1960 VC; 1962 EB · A902 TE
- Minor planet category: main-belt · (outer); background

Orbital characteristics
- Epoch 4 September 2017 (JD 2458000.5)
- Uncertainty parameter 0
- Observation arc: 115.00 yr (42,002 days)
- Aphelion: 3.8872 AU
- Perihelion: 2.4794 AU
- Semi-major axis: 3.1833 AU
- Eccentricity: 0.2211
- Orbital period (sidereal): 5.68 yr (2,075 days)
- Mean anomaly: 344.98°
- Mean motion: 0° 10^{m} 24.6^{s} / day
- Inclination: 8.9078°
- Longitude of ascending node: 157.74°
- Argument of perihelion: 235.05°

Physical characteristics
- Mean diameter: 26.78 km (derived); 26.87±1.1 km 29.205±0.338 km 29.569±0.373 km 33.12±0.57 km 36.09±7.15 km
- Synodic rotation period: 96 h
- Geometric albedo: 0.071±0.334; 0.123±0.005; 0.153±0.037; 0.1577±0.0113; 0.1703 (derived); 0.1856±0.017
- Spectral type: M
- Absolute magnitude (H): 10.30 · 10.4 · 10.61±0.27 · 10.70

1283 Komsomolia (prov. designation: 1925 SC) is a metallic background asteroid and potentially slow rotator from the outer regions of the asteroid belt. Discovered by Vladimir Albitsky in 1925, it was later named after Komsomol, a political youth organization of the former Soviet Union. The M-type asteroid has roughly a rotation period 96 hours of and measures approximately 30 kilometers (19 miles) in diameter.

== Discovery ==
Komsomolia was discovered on 25 September 1925, by Soviet astronomer Vladimir Albitsky at the Simeiz Observatory on the Crimean peninsula. It was independently discovered by German astronomer Karl Reinmuth at Heidelberg Observatory on 10 October 1925. Only the first discoverer is officially recognized. The asteroid was first observed as A902 TE at Heidelberg in October 1902.

== Orbit and classification ==
Komsomolia is a non-family asteroid of the main belt's background population when applying the hierarchical clustering method to its proper orbital elements. It orbits the Sun in the outer main-belt at a distance of 2.5–3.9 AU once every 5 years and 8 months (2,075 days). Its orbit has an eccentricity of 0.22 and an inclination of 9° with respect to the ecliptic. The body's observation arc begins at Heidelberg in October 1902, almost 23 years prior to its official discovery observation.

== Naming ==
This minor planet was named after Komsomol ("All-Union Leninist Young Communist League"), the youth wing of the Communist Party of the Soviet Union (CPSU). The official naming citation was published by the Minor Planet Center in November 1952 (M.P.C. 838).

== Physical characteristics ==
Komsomolia has been characterized as a metallic M-type asteroid by the Wide-field Infrared Survey Explorer (WISE). The Asteroid Lightcurve Database assumes it to be a carbonaceous C-type asteroid.

=== Rotation period ===
In December 2006, a fragmentary rotational lightcurve of Komsomolia was obtained from photometric observations by French amateur astronomer Pierre Antonini. Lightcurve analysis gave a rotation period of 96 hours with a brightness amplitude of 1.03 magnitude (U=1+).

=== Diameter and albedo ===
According to the surveys carried out by the Infrared Astronomical Satellite IRAS, the Japanese Akari satellite and the NEOWISE mission of NASA's WISE telescope, Komsomolia measures between 26.87 and 36.09 kilometers in diameter and its surface has an albedo between 0.071 and 0.1856. The Collaborative Asteroid Lightcurve Link derives an albedo of 0.1703 and a diameter of 26.78 kilometers based on an absolute magnitude of 10.4.
