= 1034 Mozartia =

Main-belt asteroid

Discovery
- Discovered by: V. Albitzkij
- Discovery site: Simeiz Obs.
- Discovery date: 7 September 1924

Designations
- Pronunciation: /moʊtˈsɑːrtiə/, /moʊˈzɑːrtiə/
- Named after: Wolfgang Amadeus Mozart (Austrian composer)
- Alternative designations: 1924 SS · 1971 DD_{2} 1999 DK_{7}
- Minor planet category: main-belt · (inner)

Orbital characteristics
- Epoch 4 September 2017 (JD 2458000.5)
- Uncertainty parameter 0
- Observation arc: 92.74 yr (33,873 days)
- Aphelion: 2.8959 AU
- Perihelion: 1.6899 AU
- Semi-major axis: 2.2929 AU
- Eccentricity: 0.2630
- Orbital period (sidereal): 3.47 yr (1,268 days)
- Mean anomaly: 303.07°
- Mean motion: 0° 17^{m} 2.04^{s} / day
- Inclination: 3.9709°
- Longitude of ascending node: 304.50°
- Argument of perihelion: 18.807°

Physical characteristics
- Mean diameter: 7.919±0.047 km
- Geometric albedo: 0.250±0.030
- Spectral type: SMASS = S
- Absolute magnitude (H): 12.1

1034 Mozartia, provisional designation 1924 SS, is a stony asteroid from the inner regions of the asteroid belt, approximately 8 kilometers in diameter. It was discovered on 7 September 1924, by Soviet Vladimir Albitsky at Simeiz Observatory on the Crimean peninsula, and named after Wolfgang Amadeus Mozart.

== Orbit and classification ==
Mozartia orbits the Sun in the inner main-belt at a distance of 1.7–2.9 AU once every 3 years and 6 months (1,268 days). Its orbit has an eccentricity of 0.26 and an inclination of 4° with respect to the ecliptic. The body's observation arc begins with its official discovery observation in 1924.

== Physical characteristics ==
In the SMASS classification, Mozartia is a common S-type asteroid.

=== Diameter and albedo ===
According to the survey carried out by NASA's Wide-field Infrared Survey Explorer with its subsequent NEOWISE mission, Mozartia measures 7.919 kilometers in diameter and its surface has an albedo of 0.250.

=== Lightcurves ===
As of 2017, no rotational lightcurve of Mozartia has been obtained. The body's rotation period and shape remain unknown.

== Naming ==
This minor planet was named after the influential Austrian composer Wolfgang Amadeus Mozart (1756–1791). The official naming citation was published by the Minor Planet Center in November 1952 (M.P.C. 837).
