= 1527 Malmquista =

Main-belt asteroid

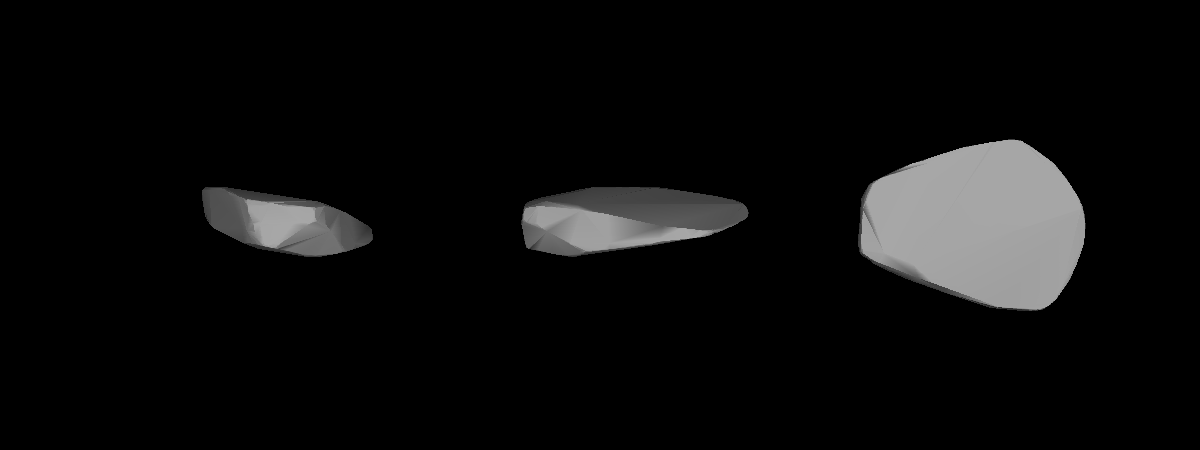
- Lightcurve-based 3D-model of Malmquista

Discovery
- Discovered by: Y. Väisälä
- Discovery site: Turku Obs.
- Discovery date: 18 October 1939

Designations
- Named after: Gunnar Malmquist (astronomer)
- Alternative designations: 1939 UG · 1929 TG; 1932 OB · 1972 TK; A909 TC
- Minor planet category: main-belt · Flora

Orbital characteristics
- Epoch 4 September 2017 (JD 2458000.5)
- Uncertainty parameter 0
- Observation arc: 87.47 yr (31,948 days)
- Aphelion: 2.6694 AU
- Perihelion: 1.7846 AU
- Semi-major axis: 2.2270 AU
- Eccentricity: 0.1987
- Orbital period (sidereal): 3.32 yr (1,214 days)
- Mean anomaly: 203.99°
- Mean motion: 0° 17^{m} 47.76^{s} / day
- Inclination: 5.1939°
- Longitude of ascending node: 16.133°
- Argument of perihelion: 304.49°

Physical characteristics
- Dimensions: 9.55±0.49 km 10.040±0.134 km 10.338±0.071 km 10.80 km (calculated)
- Synodic rotation period: 14.044±0.0244 h 14.0591 h 14.077±0.004 h
- Geometric albedo: 0.2202±0.0169; 0.24 (assumed); 0.307±0.037
- Spectral type: S
- Absolute magnitude (H): 12.0 · 12.2 · 12.481±0.002 (S)

1527 Malmquista (provisional designation 1939 UG) is a stony Florian asteroid from the inner regions of the asteroid belt, approximately 10 kilometers in diameter.

It was discovered on 18 October 1939, by Finnish astronomer Yrjö Väisälä at Turku Observatory in Southwest Finland. It was named for the Swedish astronomer Gunnar Malmquist.

== Orbit and classification ==
Malmquista is a member of the Flora family, one of the largest families of stony asteroids in the main belt. It orbits the Sun in the inner main-belt at a distance of 1.8–2.7 AU once every 3 years and 4 months (1,214 days). Its orbit has an eccentricity of 0.20 and an inclination of 5° with respect to the ecliptic. In 1909, it was first observed at Heidelberg Observatory as A909 TC. The body's observation arc begins at Lowell Observatory in 1929, when it was identified as 1929 TG, 10 years prior to its official discovery observation at Turku.

== Physical characteristics ==
=== Rotation period ===
In September 2002, a first rotational lightcurve of Malmquista was obtained from photometric observations by Stephen Brincat at Flarestar Observatory on the island of Malta. Lightcurve analysis gave a well-defined rotation period of 14.077 hours with a brightness variation of 0.60 magnitude (U=3). In September 2012, observations at the Palomar Transient Factory, California, gave a period of 14.044 hours and an amplitude of 0.42 magnitude (U=2).

=== Spin axis ===
In 2013, an international study modeled a lightcurve with a period of 14.0591 hours and found a spin axis of (5.0°, 80.0°) in ecliptic coordinates (λ, β) (U=n.a.).

=== Diameter and albedo ===
According to the survey carried out by NASA's Wide-field Infrared Survey Explorer with its subsequent NEOWISE mission, Malmquista measures between 9.55 and 10.338 kilometers in diameter and its surface has an albedo between 0.220 and 0.307. The Collaborative Asteroid Lightcurve Link assumes an albedo of 0.24 – derived from 8 Flora, a S-type asteroid and the family's largest member and namesake – and calculates a diameter of 10.80 kilometers with an absolute magnitude of 12.0.

== Naming ==
This minor planet was named after Swedish astronomer Gunnar Malmquist (1893–1982), director of the Uppsala Astronomical Observatory in Sweden. The official naming citation was published by the Minor Planet Center in January 1956 (M.P.C. 1350).
