= Vladimir Albitsky =

Soviet/Russian astronomer

Minor planets discovered: 10
see § List of discovered minor planets

Vladimir Aleksandrovich Albitzky (Russian: Владимир Александрович Альбицкий) (16 June 1891 – 15 June 1952) was a Soviet/Russian astronomer and discoverer of minor planets. In modern English transliteration, his surname would be given as Al'bitskii or Al'bitsky. In the literature, he is sometimes referred to as W. A. Albizkij, however his surname usually appears in the literature as "Albitzky". His asteroid discoveries are credited as "V. Albitskij".

He came to the Simeiz Observatory (Симеиз) in Crimea in 1922, working with G. A. Shajn and G. N. Neujmin, and became head of the observatory in 1934. The Minor Planet Center credits him with the discovery of 10 asteroids during 1923–1925.

The Eunomia asteroid 1783 Albitskij, discovered by astronomer Grigory Neujmin at Simeiz Observatory in 1935, was named in his honor.

== List of discovered minor planets ==
1002 Olbersia	15 August 1923	list
1007 Pawlowia	5 October 1923	list
1022 Olympiada	23 June 1924	list
1028 Lydina	6 November 1923	list
1030 Vitja	25 May 1924	list

1034 Mozartia	7 September 1924	list
1059 Mussorgskia	19 July 1925	list
1071 Brita	3 March 1924	list
1283 Komsomolia	25 September 1925	list
1330 Spiridonia	17 February 1925	list

== Papers by V.A. Albitzky ==
The total number of papers by V.A. Albitzky is about 88 according to his File from the Archive of the Pulkovo Observatory. Only 5 papers can be found at the ADS NASA, while the rest are given in a copy from the archive by Alex Gaina, including a great part of the observations of asteroids.

- ADS NASA
- Gaina Alex: Papers by V.A. Albitzky

A Russian version of the work concerning radial velocities of 343 stars can be found at:

- The Danish National Library

== See also ==
- List of minor planet discoverers § V. Albitskij
