= 1330 Spiridonia =

Dark background asteroid of primitive composition

Discovery
- Discovered by: V. Albitzkij
- Discovery site: Simeiz Obs.
- Discovery date: 17 February 1925

Designations
- Named after: Spiridon Zaslavskij (discoverer's brother-in-law)
- Alternative designations: 1925 DB · 1931 FA; 1933 QK_{1} · 1942 ED; 1950 OP · 1959 EZ; A922 SA
- Minor planet category: main-belt · (outer) background

Orbital characteristics
- Epoch 4 September 2017 (JD 2458000.5)
- Uncertainty parameter 0
- Observation arc: 95.12 yr (34,741 days)
- Aphelion: 3.4092 AU
- Perihelion: 2.9306 AU
- Semi-major axis: 3.1699 AU
- Eccentricity: 0.0755
- Orbital period (sidereal): 5.64 yr (2,061 days)
- Mean anomaly: 104.05°
- Mean motion: 0° 10^{m} 28.56^{s} / day
- Inclination: 15.957°
- Longitude of ascending node: 158.82°
- Argument of perihelion: 4.4832°

Physical characteristics
- Dimensions: 50.73±15.63 km 51.96±16.95 km 55.08±4.9 km 55.17 km (derived); 68.417±0.584 km 69.917±1.110 km 73.75±1.44 km 78.496±27.90 km
- Synodic rotation period: 9.626±0.002 h 9.67±0.01 h 10.3±0.03 h 10.3±0.3 h 10.302±0.001 h
- Geometric albedo: 0.029±0.001; 0.0297±0.0177; 0.0309±0.0051; 0.032±0.004; 0.0498±0.010; 0.0580 (derived); 0.06±0.04; 0.06±0.05
- Spectral type: Tholen = P B–V = 0.670; U–B = 0.170
- Absolute magnitude (H): 10.00 · 10.03 · 10.17 · 10.26±0.10

1330 Spiridonia, provisional designation 1925 DB, is a dark background asteroid of primitive composition, located in the outer regions of the asteroid belt, approximately 65 kilometers in diameter. It was discovered on 17 February 1925, by Soviet astronomer Vladimir Albitsky at the Simeiz Observatory on the Crimean peninsula. The asteroid was named after the discoverer's brother-in-law, Spiridon Zaslavskij.

== Orbit and classification ==
Spiridonia is a non-family asteroid from the main belt's background population. It orbits the Sun in the outer asteroid belt at a distance of 2.9–3.4 AU once every 5 years and 8 months (2,061 days; semi-major axis of 3.17 AU). Its orbit has an eccentricity of 0.08 and an inclination of 16° with respect to the ecliptic.

The asteroid was first identified as A922 SA at Heidelberg Observatory in September 1922. The body's observation arc begins at Yerkes Observatory in October 1934, more than 9 years after its official discovery observation at Simeiz.

== Physical characteristics ==
In the Tholen classification, Spiridonia is a primitive P-type asteroid.

=== Rotation period ===
Several rotational lightcurves of Spiridonia have been obtained from photometric observations since 2004. Analysis of the best-rated lightcurve by American photometrist Robert Stephens at the Santana Observatory (646) from April 2005, gave a rotation period of 9.67 hours with a brightness amplitude of 0.16 magnitude (U=3).

=== Diameter and albedo ===
According to the surveys carried out by the Infrared Astronomical Satellite IRAS, the Japanese Akari satellite and the NEOWISE mission of NASA's Wide-field Infrared Survey Explorer, Spiridonia measures between 50.73 and 78.496 kilometers in diameter and its surface has an albedo between 0.029 and 0.06.

The Collaborative Asteroid Lightcurve Link derives an albedo of 0.0580 and a diameter of 55.17 kilometers based on an absolute magnitude of 10.0.

1330 Spiridonia has been observed to occult 5 stars between 1993 and 2023.

== Naming ==
This minor planet was named after the discoverer's brother-in-law, Spiridon Zaslavskij (1883–1942), who was also the uncle of Viktorovich Zaslavskij (1925–1944), after whom the discoverer named the asteroid 1030 Vitja. The official naming citation was published by the Minor Planet Center on 15 July 1968 (M.P.C. 2882).
