= 1028 Lydina =

Carbonaceous main-belt asteroid

Discovery
- Discovered by: V. Albitzkij
- Discovery site: Simeiz Obs.
- Discovery date: 6 November 1923

Designations
- Named after: Lydia Il'inichna Albitskaya (discoverer's wife)
- Alternative designations: 1923 PG · A907 JF; A914 JA
- Minor planet category: main-belt · (outer) background · Cybele (Note: See online excerpt of Linda T. Elkins-Tanton's book Asteroids, meteorites, and comets (2011); and orbital criteria in Minor planet groups/families by projectpluto.com. Also see comment at Asteroid family § Cybele group.)

Orbital characteristics
- Epoch 23 March 2018 (JD 2458200.5)
- Uncertainty parameter 0
- Observation arc: 110.80 yr (40,471 d)
- Aphelion: 3.7695 AU
- Perihelion: 3.0454 AU
- Semi-major axis: 3.4075 AU
- Eccentricity: 0.1062
- Orbital period (sidereal): 6.29 yr (2,297 d)
- Mean anomaly: 346.68°
- Mean motion: 0° 9^{m} 24.12^{s} / day
- Inclination: 9.3940°
- Longitude of ascending node: 62.833°
- Argument of perihelion: 24.747°

Physical characteristics
- Mean diameter: 71.38±2.2 km 81.85±21.71 km 88.526±0.762 km 96.830±1.081 km 97.18±1.38 km
- Synodic rotation period: 11.674±0.002 h 11.680±0.005 h 15.69 h 48±1 h (poor)
- Geometric albedo: 0.0318±0.0054; 0.032±0.001; 0.038±0.006; 0.04±0.05; 0.0586±0.004
- Spectral type: Tholen = C B–V = 0.684; U–B = 0.276
- Absolute magnitude (H): 9.43; 10.31±0.76

1028 Lydina, provisional designation 1923 PG, is a carbonaceous background asteroid and member of the Cybele group from the outermost regions of the asteroid belt, approximately 82 kilometers (50 miles) in diameter. It was discovered at the Simeiz Observatory on the Crimean peninsula on 6 November 1923, by Soviet astronomer Vladimir Albitsky, who named it after his wife, Lydia Ilʹinichna Albitskaya. The dark C-type asteroid has a rotation period of 11.68 hours.

== Orbit and classification ==
Lydina is a non-family asteroid from the main belt's background population when applying the hierarchical clustering method to its proper orbital elements. Based on osculating Keplerian orbital elements, the asteroid is considered a member of the dynamical Cybele group, which are asteroid with low orbital inclinations and eccentricities, and with a semi-major axis between 3.3 and 3.5 AU, near the 4:7 orbital resonance with Jupiter.

It orbits the Sun in the outermost asteroid belt at a distance of 3.0–3.8 AU once every 6 years and 3 months (2,297 days; semi-major axis of 3.41 AU). Its orbit has an eccentricity of 0.11 and an inclination of 9° with respect to the ecliptic.

The body's observation arc begins with its first observation as A907 JF at Heidelberg Observatory in May 1907, more than 16 years prior to its official discovery observation at Simeiz.

== Physical characteristics ==
In the Tholen, Lydina is a carbonaceous C-type asteroid.

=== Rotation period ===
In November 2011, a rotational lightcurve of Lydina was obtained from photometric observations by Robert Stephens at his Santana Observatory (646) in California. Lightcurve analysis gave a well-defined rotation period of 11.680 hours with a brightness variation of 0.22 magnitude (U=3). Observations at the Italian Bassano Bresciano Observatory in December 2011 measured a concurring period 11.674 with an amplitude of 0.30 magnitude (U=3-). A previous observations at the Pico dos Dias Observatory (874), Brazil, gave a period of 15.69 hours, which Stephens interpreted as a 4:3-alias period solution of his results. A provisional lightcurve from March 2007, obtained by French amateur astronomers Pierre Antonini and Jean-Gabriel Bosch (48 hours) is of poor quality (U=1).

=== Diameter and albedo ===
According to the surveys carried out by the Infrared Astronomical Satellite IRAS, the Japanese Akari satellite and the NEOWISE mission of NASA's Wide-field Infrared Survey Explorer, Lydina measures between 71.38 and 97.18 kilometers in diameter and its surface has an albedo between 0.0318 and 0.0586.

The Collaborative Asteroid Lightcurve Link adopts the results obtained by IRAS, that is, an albedo of 0.0586 and a diameter of 71.38 kilometers based on an absolute magnitude of 9.43.

1028 Lydina has been observed to occult 5 stars between 2000 and 2023.

== Naming ==
This minor planet was named after Lydia Il'inichna Albitskaya, wife of the discoverer Vladimir Albitsky (1891–1952). No accurate naming citation was given for this asteroid in The Names of the Minor Planets. The author of the Dictionary of Minor Planets, Lutz Schmadel, learned about the naming circumstances from Nikolai Chernykh (1931–2004), who was himself a prolific long-time astronomer at Nauchnij, Crimea.
