= Parallax =

Difference in apparent position with viewing angle

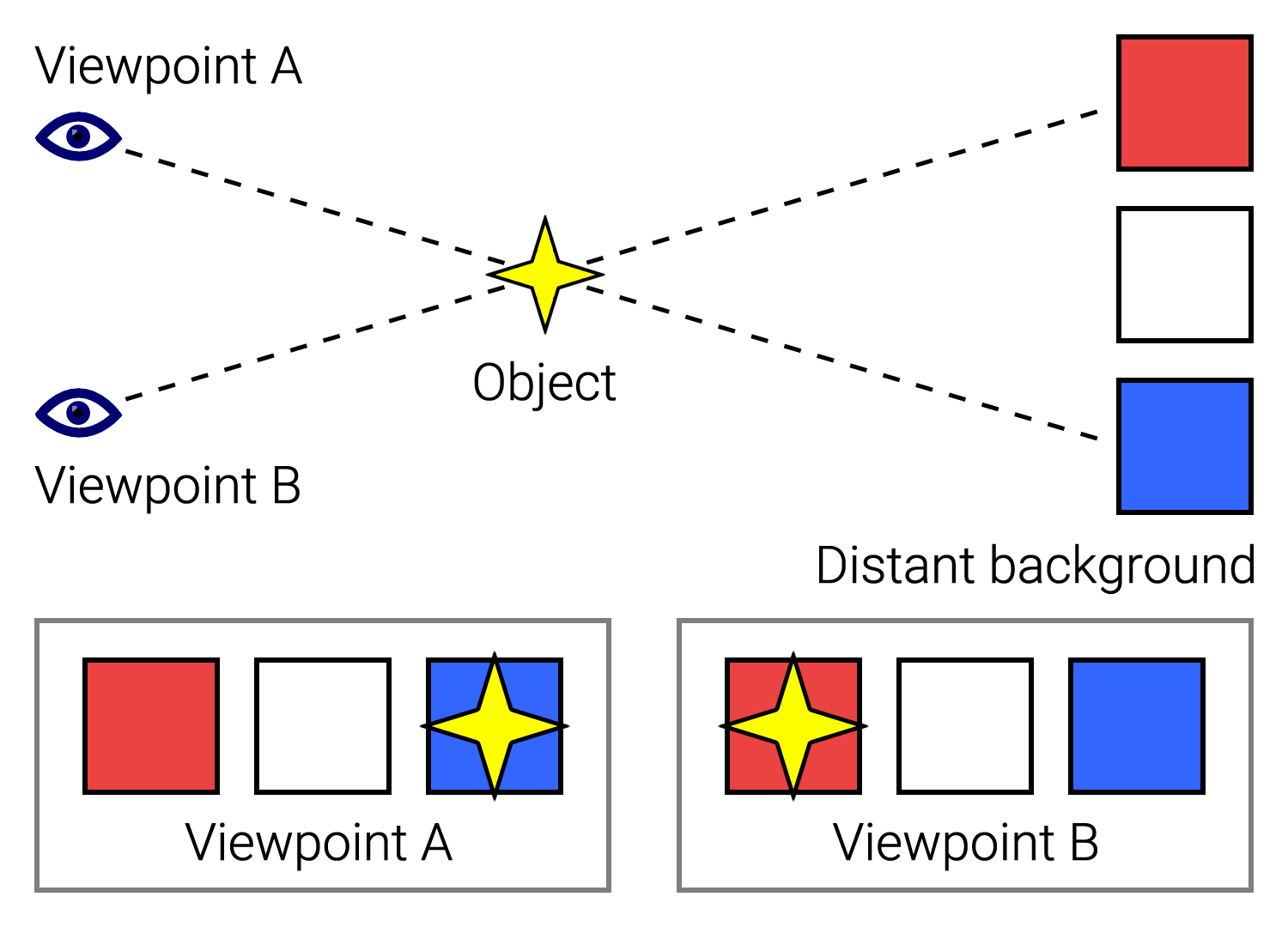
A simplified illustration of the parallax of an object against a distant background due to a perspective shift. When viewed from "Viewpoint A", the object appears to be in front of the blue square. When the viewpoint is changed to "Viewpoint B", the object appears to have moved in front of the red square.

This animation is an example of parallax. As the viewpoint moves side to side, the objects in the distance appear to move more slowly than the objects close to the camera. In this case, the white cube in front appears to move faster than the green cube in the middle of the far background.

Parallax is a displacement or difference in the apparent position of an object viewed along two different lines of sight and is measured by the angle or half-angle of inclination between those two lines. Due to foreshortening, nearby objects show a larger parallax than farther objects, so parallax can be used to determine distances.

To measure large distances, such as the distance of a planet or a star from Earth, astronomers use the principle of parallax. Here, the term parallax is the semi-angle of inclination between two sight-lines to the star, as observed when Earth is on opposite sides of the Sun in its orbit. (Note: In the past diurnal parallax was also used to measure distances to celestial objects within the Solar System. This method has now been superseded by more accurate techniques.) These distances form the lowest rung of what is called "the cosmic distance ladder"; they are the first in a succession of methods by which astronomers determine the distances to celestial objects and serve as a basis for other distance measurements in astronomy, which form the higher rungs of the ladder.

Because parallax is weak if the triangle formed with an object under observation and two observation points has an angle much greater than 90°, the use of parallax for distance measurements is usually restricted to objects that are directly "faced" by the baseline (the line between two observation points) of the formed triangles.

Parallax also affects optical instruments such as rifle scopes, binoculars, microscopes, and twin-lens reflex cameras that view objects from slightly different angles. Many animals, along with humans, have two eyes with overlapping visual fields that use parallax to gain depth perception; this process is known as stereopsis. In computer vision the effect is used for computer stereo vision, and there is a device called a parallax rangefinder that uses it to find the range and, in some variations, also altitude to a target.

A simple everyday example of parallax can be seen in the dashboards of motor vehicles that use a needle-style mechanical speedometer. When viewed from directly in front, the speed may show exactly 60, but when viewed from the passenger seat, the needle may appear to show a slightly different speed due to the angle of viewing combined with the displacement of the needle from the plane of the numerical dial.

== Visual perception ==
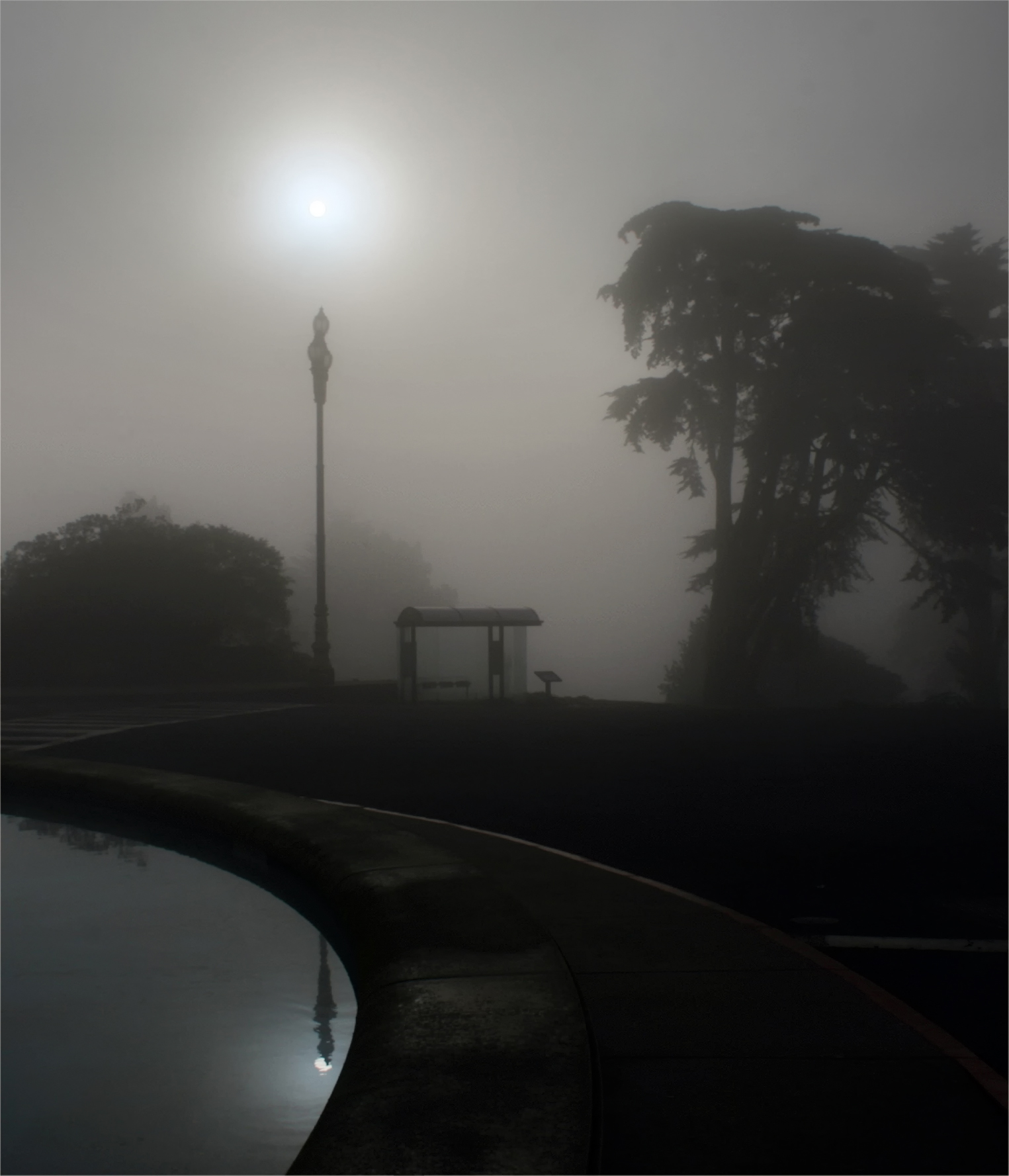
In this photograph, the Sun is visible above the top of the streetlight. In the reflection on the water, the Sun appears in line with the streetlight because the virtual image is formed from a different viewing position.

Because the eyes of humans and other animals are in different positions on the head, they present different views simultaneously. This is the basis of stereopsis, the process by which the brain exploits the parallax due to the different views from the eyes to gain depth perception and estimate distances to objects.

Some animals also use motion parallax, in which the animal (or just its head) moves to gain different viewpoints. For example, pigeons (whose eyes do not have overlapping fields of view and thus cannot use stereopsis) bob their heads up and down to see depth. Motion parallax is also exploited in wiggle stereoscopy, computer graphics that provide depth cues through viewpoint-shifting animation rather than through binocular vision. Parallax scrolling is used to create an illusion of depth in some 2D video games.

== Distance measurement ==
Parallax theory for finding naval distances. Once the triangle baseline length L and two angles at both sides of the baseline are known, all information of the triangle is determined, so the distance from the baseline to the naval object can be measured.

Parallax arises due to a change in viewpoint occurring due to the motion of the observer, of the observed, or both. What is essential is relative motion. By observing parallax, measuring angles, and using geometry, one can determine distance.

Distance measurement by parallax is a special case of the principle of triangulation, which states that, if one side length and two angles of a triangle are known, then the rest side lengths and the angle can be solved (i.e., the information of the triangle is fully determined). Thus, the careful measurement of the length of one baseline and two angles at the baseline edges can fix the scale of an entire triangulation network.

In astronomy, the triangle is extremely long and narrow, and by measuring both its shortest side length (the motion of the observer) and the small top angle (always less than 1 arcsecond, leaving the other two close to 90 degrees), the length of the long sides (in practice considered to be equal) can be determined. The distance d from the Sun to a star (measured in parsecs) is the reciprocal of the parallax p (measured in arcseconds): $d (\mathrm{pc}) = 1 / p (\mathrm{arcsec}).$ For example, the distance from the Sun to Proxima Centauri is 1/0.7687 = 1.3009 parsecs (4.243 ly), and a celestial object which distance is twice than this star has half the parallax 0.65045.

On Earth, a coincidence rangefinder or parallax rangefinder can be used to find the distance to a target. In surveying, the problem of resection explores angular measurements from a known baseline for determining an unknown point's coordinates.

== Astronomy ==
Stellar parallax motion from annual parallax. Half the apex angle is the parallax angle.

The blue dots (left) represent the observer. By drawing a line straight out to the star (right) from different positions and measuring the angle formed between the two (α), astronomers can measure the distance between the Earth and the star.

In astronomy, parallax is the apparent shift in position of a nearby celestial object relative to distant background objects which is caused by a change in the observer's point of view. This effect is most commonly used to measure the distance to nearby stars from two different positions in Earth's orbital cycle, usually six months apart. By measuring the parallax angle, the measure of change in a star's position from one point of measurement to another, astronomers can use trigonometry to calculate how far away the star is.

The concept hinges on the geometry of a triangle formed between the Earth at two different points in its orbit at one end and a star at the other. The parallax angle is half the angle (α) formed at the star between those two lines of sight. The closer the star is to the observer, the larger the angle would be.

Parallax is a foundational method in the cosmic distance ladder, a series of techniques astronomers use to measure distances in the universe. While parallax is only effective at measuring distances of nearby stars, space telescopes like Gaia have significantly expanded its effectiveness. Parallax remains the most direct and reliable method for measuring stellar distances, forming the basis for calibrating more indirect methods to measure distances to galaxies and beyond.

== Metrology ==
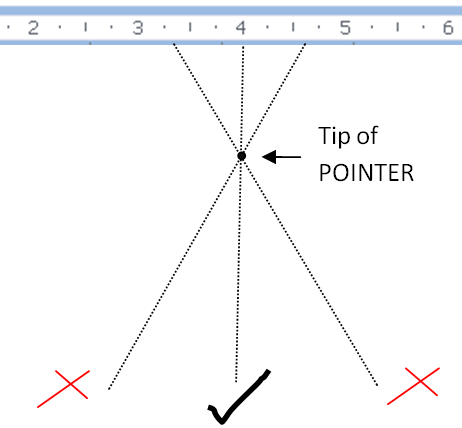
The correct line of sight is required to avoid parallax error where a different line of sight gives a different reading from a measurement instrument.

Measurements made by viewing the position of some markers relative to something to be measured are subject to an error caused by parallax, if the markers are some distance away from the object under measurement and not viewed from the correct position or angle. An example is reading the position of a pointer against a scale in an instrument such as an analog multimeter as shown in the right figure. The same effect alters the speed read on a car's speedometer by a driver in front of it and a passenger off to the side, values read from a graticule, not in actual contact with the display on an oscilloscope, etc.

To help the user avoid this problem, the scale is sometimes printed above a narrow strip of mirror, and the user's eye is positioned so that the pointer obscures its reflection, guaranteeing that the user's line of sight is perpendicular to the mirror and therefore to the scale.

== Photogrammetry ==
When viewed through a stereo viewer, an aerial picture pair offers a pronounced stereo effect of landscape and buildings. High buildings appear to "keel over" in the direction away from the center of the photograph. Measurements of this parallax are used to deduce the height of the buildings, provided that flying height and baseline distances are known. This is a key component of the process of photogrammetry.

== Photography ==
Parallax error can be seen when taking photos with many types of cameras, such as twin-lens reflex cameras and those including viewfinders (such as rangefinder cameras). In such cameras, the eye sees the subject through different optics (the viewfinder, or a second lens) than the one through which the photo is taken. As the viewfinder is often found above the lens of the camera, photos with parallax error are often slightly lower than intended, the classic example being the image of a person with their head cropped off. This problem is addressed in single-lens reflex cameras, in which the viewfinder sees through the same lens through which the photo is taken (with the aid of a movable mirror), thus avoiding parallax error.

Parallax is also an issue in image stitching, such as for panoramas.

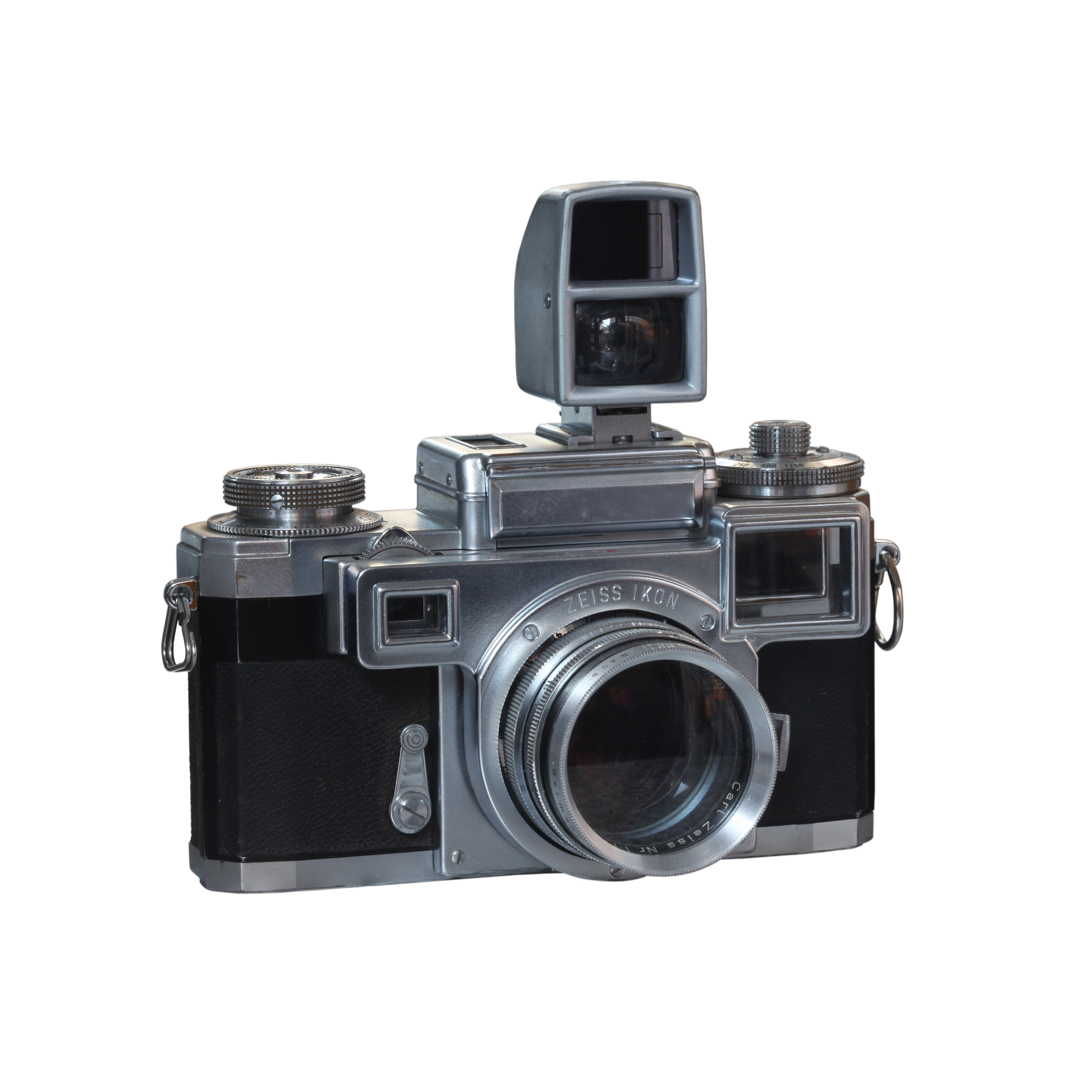
Contax III rangefinder camera with macro photography setting. Because the viewfinder is on top of the lens and near the subject, goggles are fitted in front of the rangefinder and a dedicated viewfinder is installed to compensate for parallax.

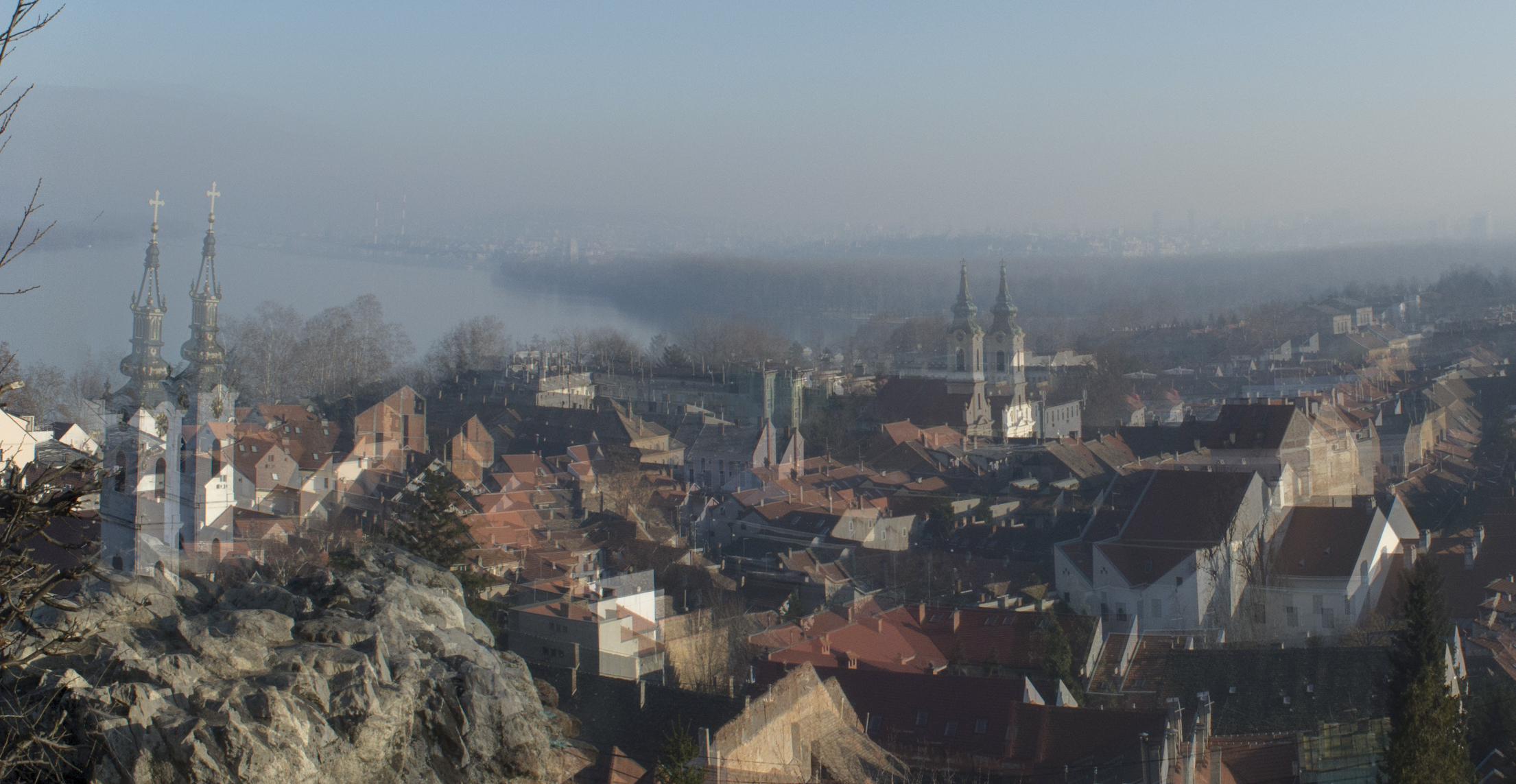
Failed panoramic image due to the parallax, since the axis of rotation of the tripod is not the same as the focal point.

== Weapon sights ==
Parallax affects sighting devices of ranged weapons in many ways. On sights fitted on small arms and bows, etc., the perpendicular distance between the sight and the weapon's launch axis (e.g. the bore axis of a gun)—generally referred to as "sight height"—can induce significant aiming errors when shooting at close range, particularly when shooting at small targets. This parallax error is compensated for (when needed) via calculations that also take in other variables such as bullet drop, windage, and the distance at which the target is expected to be. Sight height can be used to advantage when "sighting in" rifles for field use. A typical hunting rifle (.222 with telescopic sights) sighted in at 75m will still be useful from 50 to 200 m (55 to 219 yd) without needing further adjustment.

=== Optical sights ===
Simple animation demonstrating the effects of parallax compensation in telescopic sights, as the eye moves relative to the sight.

In some reticled optical instruments such as telescopes, microscopes, small arm telescopic sights and theodolites, parallax can create problems when a reticle (or its image) is not coincident with the image plane of a target. This is because when the reticle and the target are imaged in different planes, the user's eye will register the difference in parallax between the reticle and the target image (whenever eye position changes) as a relative lateral displacement on top of each other. The term parallax shift refers to the resultant apparent "floating" movements of the reticle over the target image when the user moves his/her head/eye laterally (up/down or left/right) behind the sight.

Parallax shift is particularly significant in precision shooting and long-range shooting because any involuntary deviations of the shooter's head or eye (which are often impossible to avoid) will create the impression that the aim has somewhat shifted, even if the gun's bore axis hasn't moved at all. If the shooter is unaware that the perceived "shift" is actually a counterintuitive optical illusion, he/she might actually end up ruining the aim by attempting to correct the aim. As most guns are calibrated according to the external ballistics measured during sighting-in, parallax shift basically can distract the shooter into voluntarily aiming away from the pre-established "zero" and thus missing the intended target.

To mitigate parallax shift, some telescopic sights are equipped with a parallax compensation mechanism, which consists of a movable optical element that moves the focus of the target image (at varying distances) into the same optical plane of the reticle or vice versa. Low-tier firearm scopes may have no parallax compensation because the practical demand for accuracy are not high, so their optical performances are acceptable without needing to eliminate parallax shift. In this case, the scope's optical specification is set up for a designated parallax-free distance that best suits their intended usage. Typical parallax-free distances for standard hunting scopes are 100 yards (91 m) as most game hunting shots rarely exceed 200 yards (180 m) and woodland stalking shots may be as close as 60 yards (55 m); while some scopes designed for field shooting or alpine/prairie hunting, where the targets are often located much farther away, may be adjusted to be parallax-free at ranges up to 300 yards (270 m) to make them better suited for longer ranges. On the other hand, competition- and tactical-oriented scopes (e.g. for military/paramilitary snipers and designated marksmen), which demand higher precision, typically have parallax compensation regardless of common target ranges. Scopes for guns with shorter practical ranges, such as air rifles, rimfire rifles, handguns and muzzleloaders, will also have parallax compensation down to within 50 m (55 yd), as the parallax is much more prominent at shorter distances. Airgun scopes, which are commonly used in varmint hunting of urban wildlife such as rodents and birds, are almost always found with parallax compensation, usually in the form of an adjustable objective (or "AO" for short) design, and may adjust down to as near as 3 metres (3.3 yd).

A non-magnifying reflector or "reflex" sight eliminates parallax for distant objects by using a collimating optic to image the reticle at infinity. For objects that are not infinitely far away, eye movement perpendicular to the device will cause parallax movement between the target and the reticle image that is proportional to how far the viewer's eye is off center in the cylindrical column of light created by the collimating optics. Firearm sights, such as some red dot sights, try to correct for this by not imaging the reticle at infinity, but instead at a designated target distance.

Spherical aberration in a reflector sight can also cause the reticle's image to move with change in eye position. Some reflector sights with optical systems that compensate for off-axis spherical aberration are marketed as "parallax free".

== Artillery-fire ==
Because of the positioning of field or naval artillery, each gun has a slightly different perspective of the target relative to the location of the fire-control system. When aiming guns at the target, the fire control system must compensate for parallax to assure that fire from each gun converges on the target.

== Art ==
Several of Mark Renn's sculptural works play with parallax, appearing abstract until viewed from a specific angle. One such sculpture is The Darwin Gate (pictured) in Shrewsbury, England, which from a certain angle appears to form a dome, according to Historic England, in "the form of a Saxon helmet with a Norman window... inspired by features of St Mary's Church which was attended by Charles Darwin as a boy".

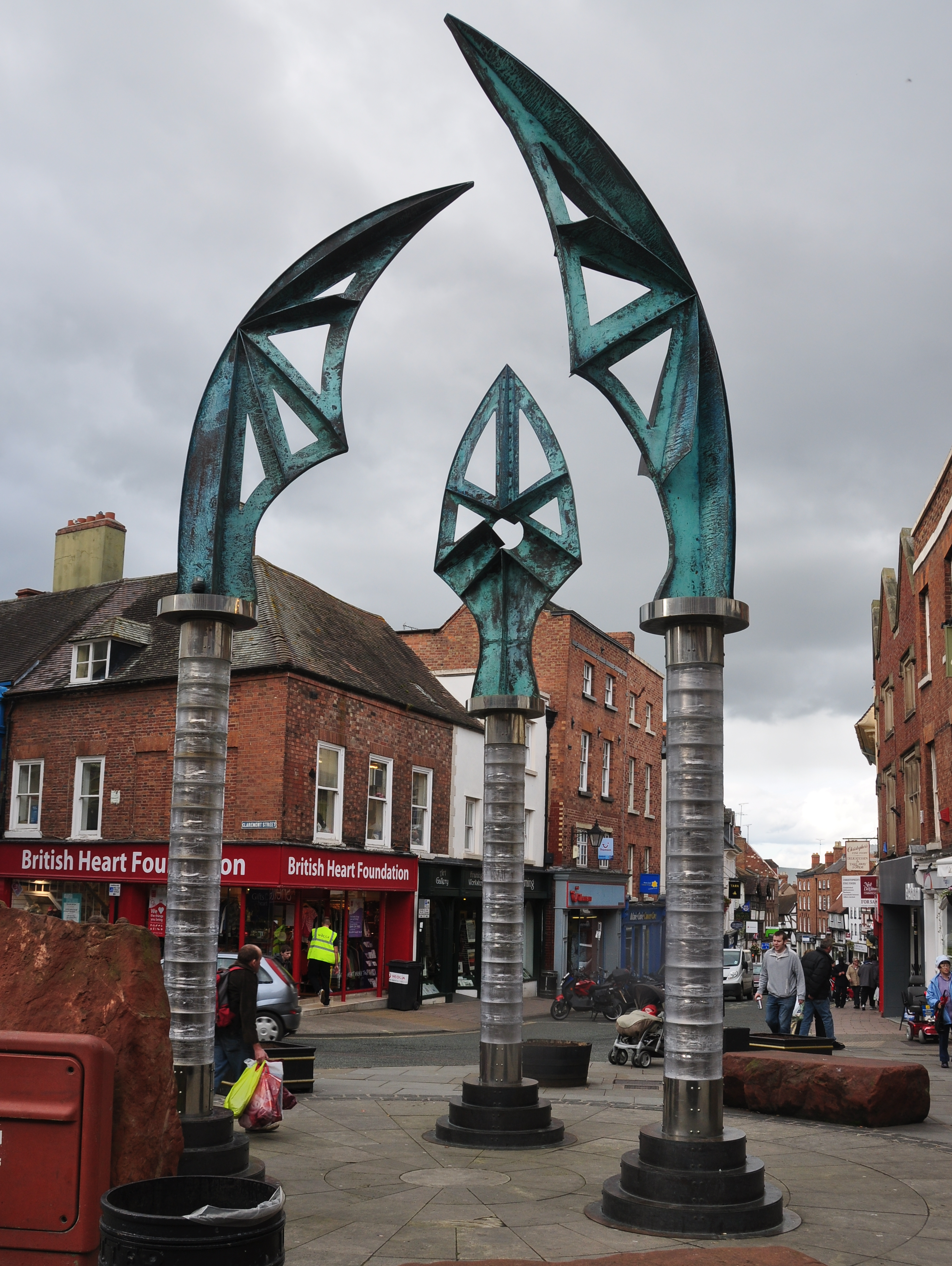
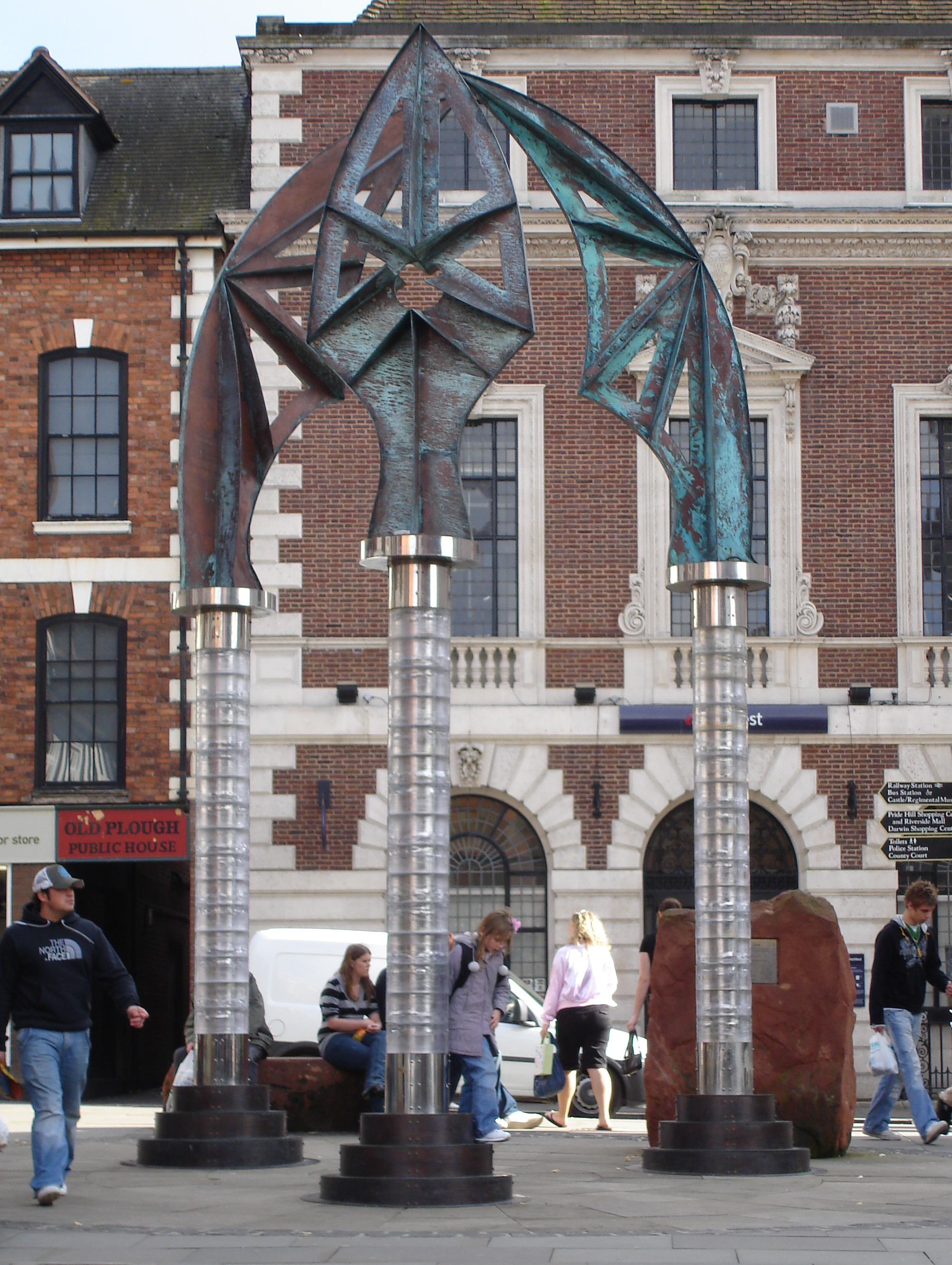
Viewed from a certain angle the curves of the three separate columns of The Darwin Gate appear to form a dome

== As a metaphor ==
In a philosophic/geometric sense: an apparent change in the direction of an object, caused by a change in observational position that provides a new line of sight. The apparent displacement, or difference of position, of an object, as seen from two different stations, or points of view. In contemporary writing, parallax can also be the same story, or a similar story from approximately the same timeline, from one book, told from a different perspective in another book. The word and concept feature prominently in James Joyce's 1922 novel, Ulysses. Orson Scott Card also used the term when referring to Ender's Shadow as compared to Ender's Game.

The metaphor is invoked by Slovenian philosopher Slavoj Žižek in his 2006 book The Parallax View, borrowing the concept of "parallax view" from the Japanese philosopher and literary critic Kojin Karatani. Žižek notes

The philosophical twist to be added (to parallax), of course, is that the observed distance is not simply "subjective", since the same object that exists "out there" is seen from two different stances or points of view. It is rather that, as Hegel would have put it, subject and object are inherently "mediated" so that an "epistemological" shift in the subject's point of view always reflects an "ontological" shift in the object itself. Or—to put it in Lacanese—the subject's gaze is always already inscribed into the perceived object itself, in the guise of its "blind spot", that which is "in the object more than the object itself", the point from which the object itself returns the gaze. "Sure the picture is in my eye, but I am also in the picture"...

— Slavoj Žižek, The Parallax View

== See also ==
- Binocular disparity
- Lutz–Kelker bias
- Parallax mapping, in computer graphics
- Parallax scrolling, in computer graphics
- Spectroscopic parallax
- Triangulation, wherein a point is calculated given its angles from other known points
- Trigonometry
- True range multilateration, wherein a point is calculated given its distances from other known points
- Xallarap

== Bibliography ==
- Hirshfeld, Alan w. (2001). Parallax: The Race to Measure the Cosmos. New York: W.H. Freeman. ISBN 978-0-7167-3711-7.
- Whipple, Fred L. (2007). Earth Moon and Planets. Read Books. ISBN 978-1-4067-6413-0..
- Zeilik, Michael A.; Gregory, Stephan A. (1998). Introductory Astronomy & Astrophysics (4th ed.). Saunders College Publishing. ISBN 978-0-03-006228-5.
