= 1022 Olympiada =

Near-Earth asteroid

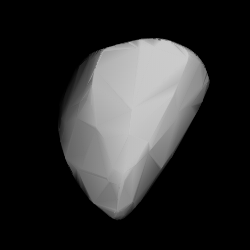
- Shape model of Olympiada from its lightcurve

Discovery
- Discovered by: V. Albitzkij
- Discovery site: Simeiz Obs.
- Discovery date: 23 June 1924

Designations
- Named after: Olimpiada Albitskaya (discoverer's mother)
- Alternative designations: 1924 RT · 1928 FQ; 1948 QO · 1957 OC; 1961 JF · 1962 QK; A910 NA
- Minor planet category: main-belt · (outer) background

Orbital characteristics
- Epoch 23 March 2018 (JD 2458200.5)
- Uncertainty parameter 0
- Observation arc: 106.79 yr (39,006 d)
- Aphelion: 3.2959 AU
- Perihelion: 2.3144 AU
- Semi-major axis: 2.8051 AU
- Eccentricity: 0.1749
- Orbital period (sidereal): 4.70 yr (1,716 d)
- Mean anomaly: 10.487°
- Mean motion: 0° 12^{m} 35.28^{s} / day
- Inclination: 21.054°
- Longitude of ascending node: 111.97°
- Argument of perihelion: 124.74°

Physical characteristics
- Mean diameter: 26.39±2.2 km 26.65 km (derived); 32.88±0.76 km 34.30±0.99 km
- Synodic rotation period: 3.822±0.006 h 3.833±0.005 h (Note: Lightcurve plot of (1022) Olympiada, Palmer Divide Observatory, B. D. Warner (2008). Rotation period 3.833±0.006 hours with a brightness amplitude of 0.34±0.02 mag. Quality code of 3. Summary figures at the LCDB); 3.8331±0.0006 h 3.83359±0.00005 h 3.834±0.001 h 3.835±0.0016 h 4.589±0.002 h (retracted)
- Geometric albedo: 0.105±0.005; 0.125±0.017; 0.1600±0.030; 0.2069 (derived)
- Spectral type: SMASS = X
- Absolute magnitude (H): 10.053±0.001 (R); 10.20; 10.46±0.26; 10.50

1022 Olympiada, provisional designation 1924 RT, is a background asteroid from the central regions of the asteroid belt, approximately 30 kilometers (19 miles) in diameter. It was discovered at the Simeiz Observatory on the Crimean peninsula on 23 June 1924, by Soviet astronomer Vladimir Albitsky, who named it after his mother, Olimpiada Albitskaya. The X-type asteroid has a short rotation period of 3.83 hours.

== Orbit and classification ==
Olympiada is a non-family asteroid from the main belt's background population. It orbits the Sun in the central asteroid belt at a distance of 2.3–3.3 AU once every 4 years and 8 months (1,716 days; semi-major axis of 2.81 AU). Its orbit has an eccentricity of 0.17 and an inclination of 21° with respect to the ecliptic.

The body's observation arc begins with its first observation as A910 NA at Heidelberg Observatory in July 1910, or nearly 14 years prior to its official discovery observation at Simeiz.

== Naming ==
This minor planet was named after Olimpiada Albitskaya, mother of the discoverer Vladimir Albitsky (1891–1952). No accurate naming citation was given for this asteroid in The Names of the Minor Planets. The author of the Dictionary of Minor Planets, Lutz Schmadel, learned about the naming circumstances from Nikolai Chernykh (1931–2004), a prolific long-time astronomer at Nauchnij, Crimea.

== Physical characteristics ==
In the SMASS classification, Olympiada is an X-type asteroid.

=== Rotation period ===
Several rotational lightcurves of Olympiada have been obtained from photometric observations by American astronomer Brian Warner at his Palmer Divide Observatory in Colorado. Analysis of the best-rated lightcurve from April 2008 gave a rotation period of 3.833 hours with a consolidated brightness variation between 0.27 and 0.66 magnitude (U=3), while the period of his first 1999-observation was later revised from 4.589 to 3.822 hours. For an asteroid of its size, it has a rather fast spin-rate.

This period is also in good agreement with other observations obtained by astronomers at the Belgrade Astronomical Observatory (3.8331 h; Δ0.35 mag) in March 2008, by astronomers at the Palomar Transient Factory (3.835 h; Δ0.46 mag) in January 2012, and by a group of Italian astronomers (3.834 h; Δ0.66 mag) in March 2017 (U=3/2/3).

=== Poles ===
In 2011, a modeled lightcurve using data from the Uppsala Asteroid Photometric Catalogue and other sources gave a concurring sidereal period 3.83359 hours, as well as two poles at (46.0°, 10.0°) and (242.0°, 52.0°) in ecliptic coordinates (λ, β) (Q=2+). Brian Warner also determined two spin axes at (40.0°, 18.0°) and (250.0°, 71.0°) using his data set from 2008 (Q=2).

=== Diameter and albedo ===
According to the surveys carried out by the Infrared Astronomical Satellite IRAS, the Japanese Akari satellite and the NEOWISE mission of NASA's Wide-field Infrared Survey Explorer, Olympiada measures between 26.39 and 34.30 kilometers in diameter and its surface has an albedo between 0.105 and 0.1600.

The Collaborative Asteroid Lightcurve Link derives an untypically high albedo of 0.2069 and a diameter of 26.65 kilometers based on an absolute magnitude of 10.2.
