= 1071 Brita =

Main-belt asteroid

Discovery
- Discovered by: V. Albitzkij
- Discovery site: Simeiz Obs.
- Discovery date: 3 March 1924

Designations
- Named after: Great Britain (part of British Isles)
- Alternative designations: 1924 RE · 1927 YB; 1947 BE · 1948 HB; 1948 JG · 1952 FJ; A910 EB · A917 SP
- Minor planet category: main-belt · (middle) background

Orbital characteristics
- Epoch 4 September 2017 (JD 2458000.5)
- Uncertainty parameter 0
- Observation arc: 107.06 yr (39,102 days)
- Aphelion: 3.1065 AU
- Perihelion: 2.4954 AU
- Semi-major axis: 2.8009 AU
- Eccentricity: 0.1091
- Orbital period (sidereal): 4.69 yr (1,712 days)
- Mean anomaly: 60.276°
- Mean motion: 0° 12^{m} 37.08^{s} / day
- Inclination: 5.3715°
- Longitude of ascending node: 52.571°
- Argument of perihelion: 27.137°

Physical characteristics
- Dimensions: 39.45±8.81 km 40.266±12.91 km 50.14 km (derived); 50.29±1.4 km 60.862±0.536 km 62.53±0.65 km 64.23±19.39 km
- Synodic rotation period: 5.8 h (poor); 5.805±0.002 h 5.8158±0.0003 h 5.8169±0.0003 h
- Geometric albedo: 0.03±0.02; 0.036±0.005; 0.042±0.001; 0.0486 (derived); 0.0524±0.0488; 0.0637±0.004; 0.07±0.03
- Spectral type: SMASS = Xk · X
- Absolute magnitude (H): 10.10 · 10.30 · 10.40 · 10.54±0.25 · 10.56

1071 Brita, provisional designation 1924 RE, is a dark asteroid from the background population of the intermediate asteroid belt, approximately 50 kilometers in diameter. It was discovered on 3 March 1924, by Soviet astronomer Vladimir Albitsky at the Simeiz Observatory on the Crimean peninsula. The asteroid was named after the island of Great Britain.

== Orbit and classification ==
Brita is a non-family asteroid from the main belt's background population. It orbits the Sun on the outer rim of the central asteroid belt at a distance of 2.5–3.1 AU once every 4 years and 8 months (1,712 days; semi-major axis of 2.80 AU). Its orbit has an eccentricity of 0.11 and an inclination of 5° with respect to the ecliptic.

The asteroid was first identified as A910 EB at Heidelberg Observatory in March 1910. The body's observation arc begins at Lowell Observatory in October 1931, more than 7 years after its official discovery observation Simeiz.

== Physical characteristics ==
In the SMASS classification, Brita is an Xk-subtype that transitions from the X-type to the rare K-type asteroids.

=== Rotation period ===
In 2001, a first, fragmentary lightcurve of Brita was published by a group of Brazilian and Argentine astronomers. Lightcurve analysis gave a rotation period of 5.8 hours with a brightness variation of 0.38 magnitude (U=1). Between 2008 and 2016, photometric observations gave three well-defined periods of 5.805, 5.8158 and 5.8169 hours and an amplitude of 0.19, 0.23 and 0.20 magnitude, respectively (U=3/3/3).

=== Diameter and albedo ===
According to the surveys carried out by the Infrared Astronomical Satellite IRAS, the Japanese Akari satellite and the NEOWISE mission of NASA's Wide-field Infrared Survey Explorer, Brita measures between 39.45 and 64.23 kilometers in diameter and its surface has an albedo between 0.03 and 0.07.

The Collaborative Asteroid Lightcurve Link derives an albedo of 0.0486 and a diameter of 50.14 kilometers based on an absolute magnitude of 10.4.

== Naming ==
This minor planet was named after the island of Great Britain, where the discovering observatory's 1-meter telescope was built. The author of the Dictionary of Minor Planet Names, Lutz Schmadel, learned about the naming circumstances from Crimean astronomers N. Solovaya and N. S. Chernykh (see 2325 Chernykh).
