= Malmquist's theorem =

In mathematics, Malmquist's theorem, is the name of any of the three theorems proved by Axel Johannes Malmquist (1913, 1920, 1941). These theorems restrict the forms of first order algebraic differential equations which have transcendental meromorphic or algebroid solutions.

== Statement of the theorems ==
Theorem (1913). If the differential equation

$$\frac{dw}{dz}=R(z,w)$$

where R(z,w) is a rational function, has a transcendental meromorphic solution, then R is a polynomial of degree at most 2 with respect to w; in other words the differential equation is a Riccati equation, or linear.

Theorem (1920). If an irreducible differential equation

$$F\left(\frac{dw}{dz},w,z\right)=0$$

where F is a polynomial, has a transcendental meromorphic solution, then the equation has no movable singularities. Moreover, it can be algebraically reduced either to a Riccati equation or to

$$\left(\frac{dw}{dz}\right)^2=a(z)P(z,w),$$

where P is a polynomial of degree 3 with respect to w.

Theorem (1941). If an irreducible differential equation

$$F\left(\frac{dw}{dz},w,z\right)=0,$$

where F is a polynomial, has a transcendental algebroid solution, then it can be algebraically reduced to an equation that has no movable singularities.

A modern account of theorems 1913, 1920 is given in the paper of A. Eremenko (1982).
