= 1030 Vitja =

Dark background asteroid from the outer regions of the asteroid belt

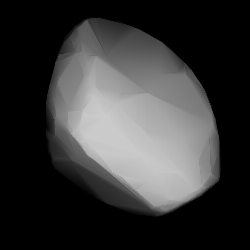
- Modelled shape of Vitja from its lightcurve

Discovery
- Discovered by: V. Albitzkij
- Discovery site: Simeiz Obs.
- Discovery date: 25 May 1924

Designations
- Named after: Viktor Zaslavskij (discoverer's relative)
- Alternative designations: 1924 RQ · 1961 AF; 1964 TB
- Minor planet category: main-belt · (outer) background

Orbital characteristics
- Epoch 23 March 2018 (JD 2458200.5)
- Uncertainty parameter 0
- Observation arc: 93.01 yr (33,972 d)
- Aphelion: 3.5067 AU
- Perihelion: 2.7357 AU
- Semi-major axis: 3.1212 AU
- Eccentricity: 0.1235
- Orbital period (sidereal): 5.51 yr (2,014 d)
- Mean anomaly: 38.994°
- Mean motion: 0° 10^{m} 43.32^{s} / day
- Inclination: 14.780°
- Longitude of ascending node: 187.86°
- Argument of perihelion: 6.2246°

Physical characteristics
- Mean diameter: 52.72±14.29 km 58.38±0.79 km 59.717±0.226 km 64.13±2.0 km 65.94±0.68 km 69.139±1.074 km
- Synodic rotation period: 5.7014±0.0003 h 6.332±0.001 h
- Geometric albedo: 0.0280±0.0121; 0.031±0.005; 0.0326±0.002; 0.040±0.001; 0.05±0.06
- Spectral type: P · C C (assumed)
- Absolute magnitude (H): 10.14±0.24; 10.30; 10.37

1030 Vitja, provisional designation 1924 RQ, is a dark background asteroid from the outer regions of the asteroid belt, approximately 60 kilometers (37 miles) in diameter. It was discovered on 25 May 1924, by Soviet–Russian astronomer Vladimir Albitsky at the Simeiz Observatory on the Crimean peninsula. The asteroid was named in honor of Viktor Zaslavskij (1925–1944), a relative of the discoverer.

== Orbit and classification ==
Vitja is a non-family asteroid from the main belt's background population. It orbits the Sun in the outer asteroid belt at a distance of 2.7–3.5 AU once every 5 years and 6 months (2,014 days; semi-major axis of 3.12 AU). Its orbit has an eccentricity of 0.12 and an inclination of 15° with respect to the ecliptic. The asteroid's first recorded observation was made a week after its official discovery at Heidelberg Observatory in June 1924, while its observation arc begins more than seven years later at Lowell Observatory in October 1931.

== Naming ==
This minor planet was named by the discoverer after his relative Viktor "Vitja" Viktorovich Zaslavskij (1925–1944), who died during World War II. He was the nephew of Spiridon Zaslavskij, the brother-in-law of the discoverer, after whom the asteroid 1330 Spiridonia was later named. No accurate naming citation was given for this asteroid in The Names of the Minor Planets. The author of the Dictionary of Minor Planets, Lutz Schmadel, researched the naming circumstances himself (LDS).

== Physical characteristics ==
Vitja has been characterized as a primitive P-type and carbonaceous C-type asteroid by the Wide-field Infrared Survey Explorer (WISE) and Pan-STARRS photometric survey, respectively. The Collaborative Asteroid Lightcurve Link (CALL) assumes it to be a very dark C-type asteroid.

=== Rotation period ===
In July 2007, a rotational lightcurve of Vitja was obtained from photometric observations by French amateur astronomer René Roy. Lightcurve analysis gave a rotation period of 5.7014 hours and a brightness variation of 0.18 magnitude (U=3-). Another observation by Andrea Ferrero at the Bigmuskie Observatory (B88) in Italy showed a period of 6.332 with an amplitude of 0.21 (U=2).

=== Diameter and albedo ===
According to the surveys carried out by the Infrared Astronomical Satellite IRAS, the Japanese Akari satellite and the NEOWISE mission of NASA's WISE telescope, Vitja measures between 52.72 and 69.139 kilometers (32.759 and 42.961 mi) in diameter and its surface has an albedo between 0.0280 and 0.05.

CALL adopts the results obtained by IRAS, that is, an albedo of 0.0326 and a diameter of 64.13 kilometers (39.85 mi) based on an absolute magnitude of 10.3.

Between 2007 and 2021, 1030 Vitja has been observed to occult four stars.
