= 1007 Pawlowia =

Asteroid

Discovery
- Discovered by: V. Albitzkij
- Discovery site: Simeiz Obs.
- Discovery date: 5 October 1923

Designations
- Named after: Ivan Pavlov (Russian physiologist)
- Alternative designations: 1923 OX · 1934 FE; 1954 UG_{1} · 1956 AK
- Minor planet category: main-belt · (middle) background

Orbital characteristics
- Epoch 4 September 2017 (JD 2458000.5)
- Uncertainty parameter 0
- Observation arc: 110.93 yr (40,516 days)
- Aphelion: 3.0098 AU
- Perihelion: 2.4048 AU
- Semi-major axis: 2.7073 AU
- Eccentricity: 0.1117
- Orbital period (sidereal): 4.45 yr (1,627 days)
- Mean anomaly: 25.348°
- Mean motion: 0° 13^{m} 16.68^{s} / day
- Inclination: 2.5423°
- Longitude of ascending node: 307.12°
- Argument of perihelion: 77.226°

Physical characteristics
- Dimensions: 18.264±0.090 km 19.263±0.062 km 20.47±7.78 km 20.83±5.50 km 24.13±0.47 km 32.03 km (calculated)
- Synodic rotation period: 8.23 h
- Geometric albedo: 0.057 (assumed); 0.080±0.004; 0.11±0.06; 0.11±0.08; 0.1200±0.0233; 0.145±0.012
- Spectral type: SMASS = K
- Absolute magnitude (H): 11.20 · 11.3 · 11.39 · 11.50

Pawlowia (minor planet designation: 1007 Pawlowia), provisional designation 1923 OX, is a background asteroid from the central regions of the asteroid belt, approximately 20 kilometers in diameter. It was discovered on 5 October 1923, by Soviet astronomer Vladimir Albitsky at the Simeiz Observatory on the Crimean peninsula. The asteroid was named after Russian physiologist and Nobelist Ivan Pavlov.

== Orbit and classification ==
Pawlowia is a non-family asteroid from the main belt's background population. It orbits the Sun in the central asteroid belt at a distance of 2.4–3.0 AU once every 4 years and 5 months (1,627 days; semi-major axis of 2.71 AU). Its orbit has an eccentricity of 0.11 and an inclination of 3° with respect to the ecliptic.

The asteroid was first imaged on a precovery taken at Lowell Observatory in December 1906. The body's observation arc begins at Simeiz on 30 October 1925, or 25 days after its official discovery observation (discovery record not listed).

== Physical characteristics ==
In the SMASS classification, Pawlowia is a K-type asteroid, which are common among members of the Eos family and known for their intermediate albedo.

=== Rotation period ===
In September 2003, a tentative rotational lightcurve of Pawlowia was obtained from photometric observations by American Maurice Clark at the Bucknell and Rosemary Hill Observatory in Pennsylvania and Florida, respectively. Analysis of the essentially flat lightcurve gave a poorly rated rotation period of 8.23 hours with a brightness amplitude of at least 0.02 magnitude (U=1). As of 2018, no secure period has been obtained.

=== Diameter and albedo ===
According to the surveys carried out by the Japanese Akari satellite and the NEOWISE mission of NASA's Wide-field Infrared Survey Explorer, Pawlowia measures between 18.264 and 24.13 kilometers in diameter and its surface has an albedo between 0.080 and 0.145.

The Collaborative Asteroid Lightcurve Link assumes a standard albedo for carbonaceous asteroids of 0.057 and consequently calculates a much larger diameter of 32.03 kilometers based on an absolute magnitude of 11.2.

== Naming ==
This minor planet was named after Russian biologist Ivan Pavlov (1849–1936), who was awarded the Nobel Prize in Physiology or Medicine in 1904 (see list of laureates). Pavlov is best known for his research on classical conditioning (Pavlov's dog).

The official naming citation was mentioned in The Names of the Minor Planets by Paul Herget in 1955 (H 96). The lunar crater Pavlov was also named in his honor.
