= Dennis Roy Hodds =

- Born: Dennis Roy Hodds; 8 May 1933
- Died: 8 April 1987 (aged 53); Cambridge, Norfolk
- Known for: Painter
- Notable work: Crucifixion, Maldon from the Estuary, Orwell Estuary, Figures by Hunstanton Pier, Leaving Yarmouth, Naval Manoeuvres, Haven Bridge – Great Yarmouth, Children playing on Gorleston Beach Summer.
- Movement: Impressionism

Dennis Roy Hodds also known as Roy Hodds (1933–1987) was an Impressionist artist between the 1960s and 1980s. Hodds initially used water colour but resided to oil paint on board. Hodds painted a range of subjects including harbour and beach scenes, fishing boats, steam drifters, landscapes and cityscapes around Norfolk and was well known for his free flowing style and exceptional use of colour.

== Biography ==
Dennis Roy Hodds was born on 8 May 1933 in 10 Fullers Hill, Great Yarmouth, Norfolk, England. He was the son of Lily May Hodds. Unfortunately nothing is known about Hodds's father and his mother died at the young age of 33. Dennis was 8 years of age and was cared for by his aunt Tilly in Belton, Norfolk and later settled in Gorleston, Norfolk. Hodds studied at the Lowestoft College of Art after winning a scholarship at the age of twelve. He married Dorothy May Hodds (née Knobbs) in March 1955 and they had four children. Hodds worked for the Great Yarmouth Borough Council as a painter and interior decorator but was forced to retire due to ill health. He spent his later life sketching and painting Norfolk scenery and many of his paintings have been exhibited throughout East Anglia. Hodds died in the Addenbrooke's Hospital in Cambridge of heart failure following a string of illnesses. After Hodds died the Great Yarmouth Guild of Artists and Craftsmen set up an annual competition in his memory.

== Local Publicity ==
=== Crucifixion ===
7 July 1960: ‘A YOUNG colleague went to the Tolhouse this week to have a look at the summer exhibition of the Yarmouth Guild of Artists and Craftsmen which finishes on 15 July. "It's a mixture as these things usually are," he writes "But there are one or two pieces which really make you think, which is essential". The most thought-provoking picture on show in his opinion is an oil-painting by D. R. Hodds called "Crucifixion"...He continues: "It is obviously symbolical of something because the object being crucified is a fantastic dream-creature. The head is almost a caricature with a crew-cut. It is lodged between a cleft at the top of the cross and through it has been thrust a bloodied stake. Its arms are coiled and twisted and droop over the cross-piece, and its body is skeletal. The legs appear to be held on to the body by a pair of braces, and the feet are thick claws."’. "Unknown". Great Yarmouth Mercury. Great Yarmouth. 7 July 1960.

=== Seago Award ===
Hodds is awarded the Edward Seago memorial print "The Anvil Cloud" after winning the Great Yarmouth Guild of Artists and Craftsmen annual competition. Hodds’winning painting was entitled "A Marshman's Cottage" "Unknown". Great Yarmouth Mercury. Great Yarmouth.

=== Long Service Award ===
In 1980 at the age of 47 Hodds receive a long service award for working for 20 years with the Great Yarmouth Borough Council's housing department as a painter and interior decorator. Hodds is handed the award by the Mayoress, Mrs. Irene Webb. "Unknown". Great Yarmouth Mercury. Great Yarmouth.

=== Vivid Imagination ===
2 September 1983: "Some members have fallen into the trap. But there is an example to all in the work of D. R. Hodds. With a vivid imagination and the introduction of unexpected colours, he puts his stamp on his landscape paintings, his ‘Acle’ being a fine example." Cary, John (2 September 1983). "Unknown". Great Yarmouth Mercury. Great Yarmouth.

=== Stamp of Maturity and Individuality ===
"One exhibitor whose work bears the stamp of maturity and individuality, yet keeps to the right side of that thin line is D. R. Hodds, whose style, with its broad masses, its atmospheric treatment of the East Anglian landscape, is instantly recognisable. What keeps his paintings out of a rut is their diversity of subject matter, and the artist's sense of composition." "Unknown". Great Yarmouth Mercury. Great Yarmouth.

=== Entry into the 20th Century British Marine Painting ===
19 September 1980: "Roy Hodds shares his (Geoffrey Chatten) interest in the sea and its cargo and has had two of his paintings in a forthcoming book titled 20th century British Marine Painting. He paints and portrays the waters of Yarmouth in a variety of moods, be it the quayside dwarfed by a heavy tanker dropping anchor or an ageing schooner taking refuge in a shaded backwater. He has been a member of the Yarmouth and District Society of Artists for 18 years, and has shown his paintings with the Royal Institute of Oil Painters and the Royal Society of Marine Artists for many years." G, R (19 September 1980). "Unknown".

=== Obituary Featured in the Great Yarmouth Mercury 16 April 1987 ===
16 April 1987: "YARMOUTH impressionist artist Roy Hodds, well known for landscape and marine studies, died last week after a long illness. Work by the painter who captured many Norfolk scenes on canvas [board], were included in a book on 20th century British marine painters. He exhibited at the Royal Institute of Oil Painters and the Royal Society of Marine Artists in London. Mr Hodds, aged 53, leaves a widow and four children. ‘This man was clearly in my humble submission, the best artist in Norfolk,’ commented Yarmouth gallery proprietor Mr Michael Wide, who has exhibited many Hodds paintings. And warm tributes also came from Mrs Margaret Carver, chairman of Yarmouth and District Society of Artists – to which Mr Hodds belonged for over 25 years. ‘He was a quiet and unassuming man but a very dedicated artist,’ she commented. Mrs Carver continued ‘His work was always personal and interesting and of very high standard. But most striking were his delightful colour scenes and arrangements of colour. He will be greatly missed in the society.’ "Unknown". Great Yarmouth Mercury. Great Yarmouth. 16 April 1987.
