= The House of the Dead (disambiguation) =

The House of the Dead is a horror video game franchise created by Sega.

The House of the Dead or House of the Dead may also refer to:

== Literature ==
- The House of the Dead (novel), an 1862 novel by Fyodor Dostoyevsky
  - From the House of the Dead, a 1930 opera by Leoš Janáček based on the novel

== Film, television and radio ==
- The House of the Dead (1932 film), a Soviet Russian film based on the novel of the same name
- The House of the Dead (1978 film), an American anthology horror film also known as Alien Zone
- House of the Dead (film), a 2003 film based on the video game
- House of the Dead 2 (film), a 2005 direct-to-video sequel to the 2003 film
- "The House of the Dead", an episode of the Torchwood: The Lost Files radio play

== Video games ==
- The House of the Dead, a series of video games
- The House of the Dead (video game), a 1997 video game and first in the franchise

== See also ==
- Juárez house of death
- Mortuary house
