= Algebroid function =

Solution of equation with analytic coefficients

In mathematics, an algebroid function is a solution of an algebraic equation whose coefficients are analytic functions. So y(z) is an algebroid function if it satisfies

$$a_d(z)y^d + \ldots + a_0(z) = 0,$$

where $a_k(z)$ are analytic. If this equation is irreducible then the function is d-valued, and can be defined on a Riemann surface having d sheets.
