= Sten Malmquist =

Swedish economist and statistician

Sten Malmquist (1917 – March 11, 2004) was a Swedish economist and statistician. Among his contributions he is famous for having constructed the Malmquist index.

Malmquist was born in Lund, and his father's work as an astronomer took the family first to Saltsjöbaden and then to Uppsala. After collaborating with Herman Wold on econometric studies of consumer demand, Malmquist got his Ph.D. in statistics from Uppsala University in 1948. Malmquist's work on duality and the metric theory of utility is still used in microeconomic theory. In 1954, he was appointed professor at Stockholm University College, later known as Stockholm University, and remained there until his retirement in 1983.

Malquist also published in probability theory, where he found a formula for the boundary probability for the Brownian motion within a finite time interval.
