= Histogram of oriented displacements =

Bi-dimensional trajectory descriptor

Histogram of oriented displacements (HOD) is a 2D trajectory descriptor. The trajectory is described using a histogram of the directions between each two consecutive points. Given a trajectory T = {P_{1}, P_{2}, P_{3}, ..., P_{n}}, where P_{t} is the 2D position at time t. For each pair of positions P_{t} and P_{t+1}, calculate the direction angle θ(t, t+1). Value of θ is between 0 and 360. A histogram of the quantized values of θ is created. If the histogram is of 8 bins, the first bin represents all θs between 0 and 45.

The histogram accumulates the lengths of the consecutive moves. For each θ, a specific histogram bin is determined. The length of the line between P_{t} and P_{t+1} is then added to the specific histogram bin.

To show the intuition behind the descriptor, consider the action of waving hands. At the end of the action, the hand falls down. When describing this down movement, the descriptor does not care about the position from which the hand started to fall. This fall will affect the histogram with the appropriate angles and lengths, regardless of the position where the hand started to fall.

HOD records for each moving point: how much it moves in each range of directions. HOD has a clear physical interpretation. It proposes that, a simple way to describe the motion of an object, is to indicate how much distance it moves in each direction. If the movement in all directions are saved accurately, the movement can be repeated from the initial position to the final destination regardless of the displacements order. However, the temporal information will be lost, as the order of movements is not stored-this is what we solve by applying the temporal pyramid, as shown in section \ref{sec:temp-pyramid}. If the angles quantization range is small, classifiers that use the descriptor will overfit. Generalization needs some slack in directions-which can be done by increasing the quantization range.
