= Hypertrophic osteodystrophy =

Bone disease in dogs

Hypertrophic Osteodystrophy (HOD) is a bone disease that occurs most often in fast-growing large and giant breed dogs; however, it also affects medium breed animals like the Australian Shepherd. The disorder is sometimes referred to as metaphyseal osteopathy, and typically first presents between the ages of 2 and 7 months. HOD is characterized by decreased blood flow to the metaphysis (the part of the bone adjacent to the joint) leading to a failure of ossification (bone formation) and necrosis and inflammation of cancellous bone. The disease is usually bilateral in the limb bones, especially the distal radius, ulna, and tibia.

The Weimaraner, Irish Setter, Boxer, German Shepherd, and Great Dane breeds are heavily represented in case reports of HOD in the veterinary literature, but the severity of symptoms and possible etiology may be different across the breeds. For example, familial clustering of the disease has been documented in the Weimaraner, but not in other breeds. The disease in the Weimaraner and Irish Setter can be particularly severe, with significant mortality observed in untreated dogs. The classical age of onset is typically 8 to 16 weeks of age, with males and females equally affected.

== Speculated causes of HOD ==
Causes have been speculated to include decreased Vitamin C uptake, increased vitamin (other than C) and mineral uptake, and infection with canine distemper virus(CDV). Decreased Vitamin C uptake has been dismissed as a cause, but excessive calcium supplementation remains a possibility. There is no evidence over-feeding is a significant cause. In Weimaraners, recent vaccination with a modified live vaccine has been a suspected cause, partly because HOD often presents immediately after a vaccination, and partly because of the autoimmune nature of the disorder. The canine distemper vaccination in particular has been a suspected causal factor due to the significant number of overlapping symptoms observed between systemically affected HOD puppies and dogs suffering from distemper, but to-date, no definitive linkage has been demonstrated. The cause of canine HOD largely remains unknown. However, because of the familial clustering, HOD in the Weimaraner is suspected to have a genetic, or partly genetic, origin.

== Clinical features ==
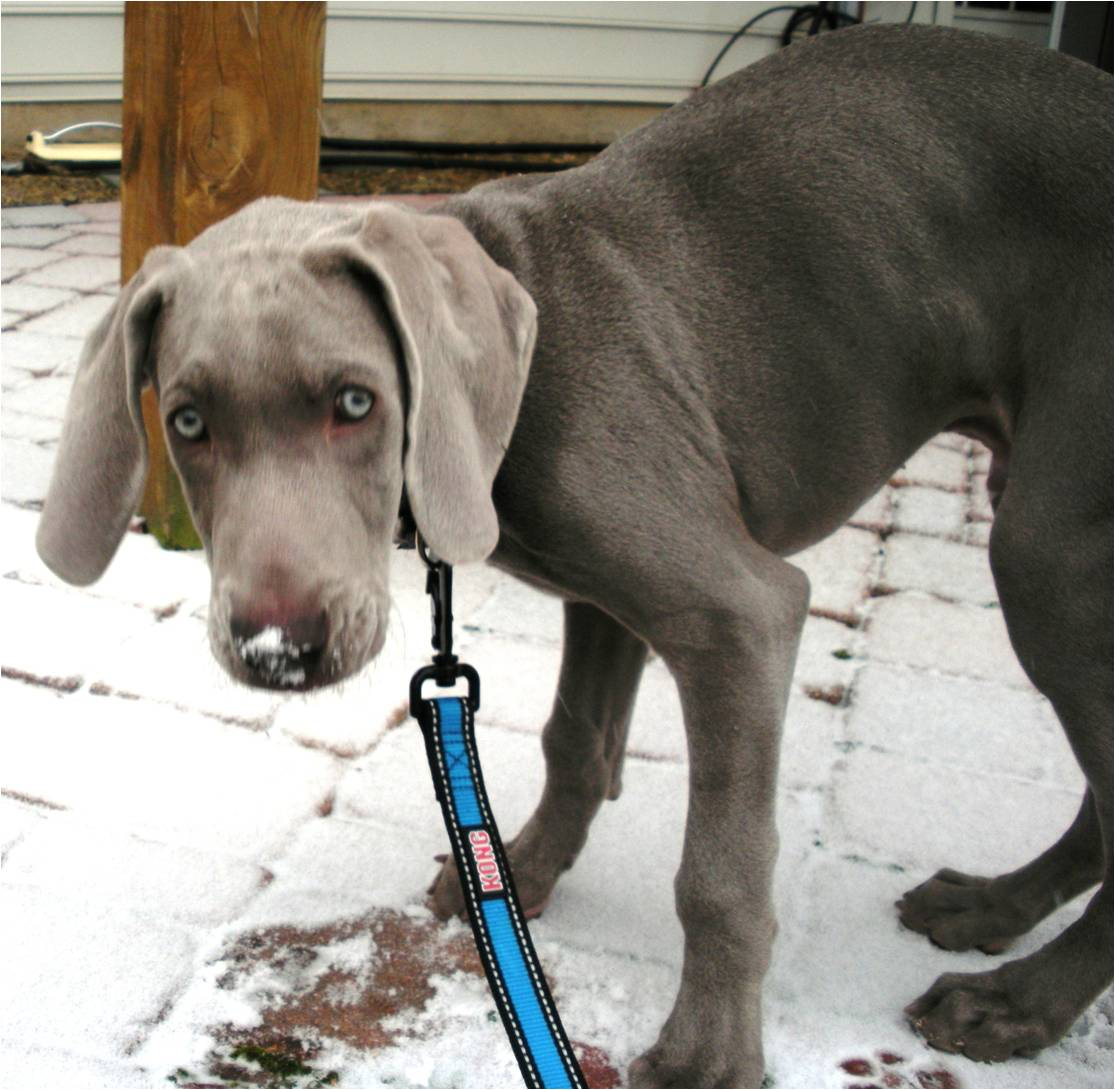
Figure 2: Characteristic roaching in 4-month-old Weimaraner puppy with HOD.

A primary characteristics of the condition is lameness. This is generally due to the swelling of the metaphysis of the long bones that is observed. Other bones may be affected, particularly the ribs, the metacarpal bones, the mandible, and the scapula. Lameness may present as mild limping or more severely as a reluctance or inability to stand. In some breeds and/or individuals, the stance of an HOD puppy as observed from behind has sometimes been described as “cow-hocked.” Shaking of limbs and a reluctance to put full body weight on the front legs is often observed. Sometimes the puppy will exhibit a characteristic “roaching” or arching of the spine when standing (see Figure 2).

Lameness is accompanied by pain upon palpation of affected bones, warmth in the limb as felt by the inside of the clinician's wrist, depression, and loss of appetite. Limb involvement is usually bilateral, typically involves the distal radius and ulna, and may be episodic. There is evidence to suggest that most dogs recover after one episode, but some relapse. Dogs suffering systemic manifestations of the disorder often have poorer prognoses. Systemic manifestations include fever, multiple body organ inflammation, nasal (nose) and ocular (eye) discharge, diarrhea, hyperkeratosis of the foot pads, pneumonia, and tooth enamel hypoplasia (many of these symptoms overlap with symptoms of CDV). Early diagnosis must be based on clinical signs, so prior to diagnosis other disorders should be ruled out (e.g., nutritional bone disease, and osteochondrosis).

== Radiographic features ==
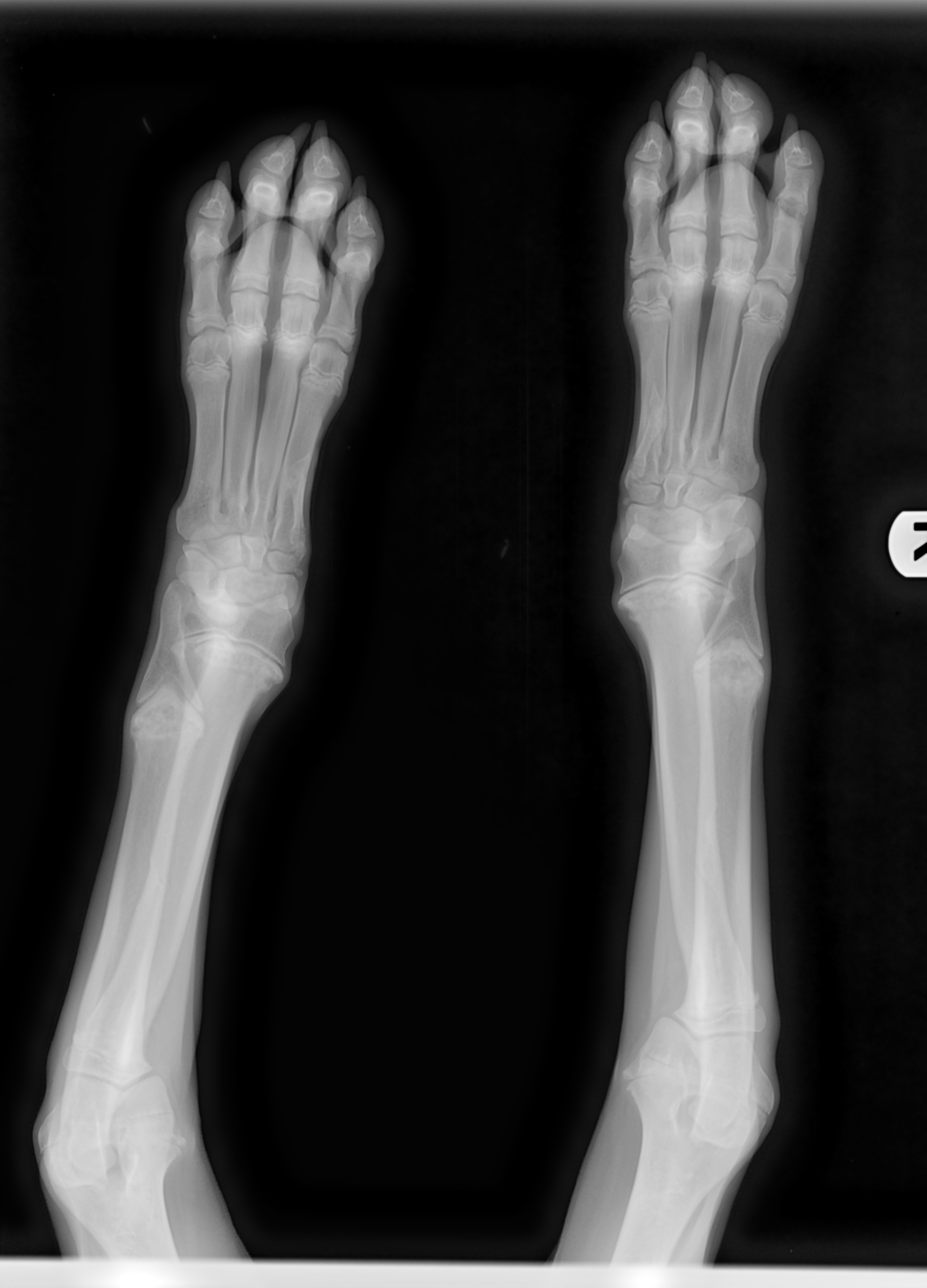
Figure 3: X-Ray image of HOD presentation in 4-month-old Weimaraner puppy. Note "moth-eaten" appearance of metaphyses.

Diagnosis relies on clinical signs and characteristic changes in radiographic images of the metaphyses. Bone changes can be observed on radiograph, and the disorder may progress to actual angular limb deformity. In the early stage of the illness, the metaphyseal area on X-ray may be observed to have an uneven radiolucent zone parallel to the physis with a thin band of increased radiodensity directly bordering the physis. Early stage radiographic changes have sometimes been described as having a "moth-eaten" appearance (see Figure 3). As the disease progresses, the radiolucent line may disappear and radiodensity may increase in the affected area as the body attempts to repair damage. Relapses can cause new radiolucent lines. This area is often followed by a dark line at the metaphysis, which may progress to new bone growth on the outside of that area. This area represents microfractures in the metaphysis and bone proliferation to bridge the defect in the periosteum.

== Treatment ==
Treatment options have been controversial. Mild illness is often successfully treated with pain medication (usually NSAIDs) and supportive care. Dogs presenting with severe, systemic symptoms not responding to NSAID treatment require more intensive treatment. The Weimaraner and Irish Setter American Kennel Club (AKC) parent clubs advocate the use of immunosuppressive doses of corticosteroids, supplemented with antibiotics and antacids (to compensate for the decreased thickness of the stomach's mucosal lining as a result of the corticosteroids and to decrease the possibility of forming stomach ulcers). More severe cases that are not recognized and treated early often require IV fluids, electrolytes, nutritional support, and significant nursing care to achieve successful results. AKC parent clubs have supported research into the genetic causes of HOD, and have reported fairly good success using this protocol, saving many puppies from unnecessary suffering, deformity, and death.

NOTE: Supplementation of Vitamin C is contraindicated due to an increase in calcium levels in the blood, possibly worsening the disease.

== Breeds at increased risk for HOD ==
- Alaskan Malamute
- American Akita
- Boxer
- Chesapeake Bay Retriever
- Dalmatian
- German Shepherd Dog
- Golden Retriever
- Great Dane
- Irish Setter
- Irish Wolfhound
- Japanese Akita
- Labrador Retriever
- Newfoundland
- Slovakian Rough Haired Pointer
- Weimaraner
