= Axel Johannes Malmquist =

Swedish mathematician (1882–1952)

Axel Johannes Malmquist (19 October 1882 in Hammars parish, Örebro county – 24 February 1952 in Solna) was a Swedish mathematician working in the area of ordinary differential equations.

He studied in the Stockholm University in 1900-1907 and obtained PhD in Stockholm in 1909. He worked in the university of Stockholm in 1903-1913, and then became a professor in the Stockholm Institute of Technology.

His most famous results are Malmquist theorems on first order algebraic differential equations, and discovery of Hamiltonian structure of Painlevé equations.
