= Luminosity function (astronomy) =

Astronomical measure

In astronomy, a luminosity function gives the number of stars or galaxies per luminosity interval. Luminosity functions are used to study the properties of large groups or classes of objects, such as the stars in clusters or the galaxies in the Local Group.

Note that the term "function" is slightly misleading, and the luminosity function might better be described as a luminosity distribution. Given a luminosity as input, the luminosity function essentially returns the abundance of objects with that luminosity (specifically, number density per luminosity interval).

== Main sequence luminosity function ==
The main sequence luminosity function maps the distribution of main sequence stars according to their luminosity. It is used to compare star formation and death rates, and evolutionary models, with observations. Main sequence luminosity functions vary depending on their host galaxy and on selection criteria for the stars, for example in the Solar neighbourhood or the Small Magellanic Cloud.

== White dwarf luminosity function ==
The white dwarf luminosity function (WDLF) gives the number of white dwarf stars with a given luminosity. As this is determined by the rates at which these stars form and cool, it is of interest for the information it gives about the physics of white dwarf cooling and the age and history of the Galaxy.

== Schechter luminosity function ==
The Schechter luminosity function $\phi$ provides an approximation of the abundance of galaxies in a luminosity interval $[L+dL]$. The luminosity function has units of a number density $n$ per unit luminosity and is given by a power law with an exponential cut-off at high luminosity

$$dn(L) = \phi~ dL = \phi^* \left(\frac{L}{L^*}\right)^\alpha \mathrm{e}^{-L/L^*} d\left(\frac{L}{L^*}\right),$$

where $L^*$ is a characteristic galaxy luminosity controlling the cut-off, and the normalization $\,\!\phi^*$ has units of number density.

Equivalently, this equation can be expressed in terms of log-quantities with

$$dn(L) = \ln(10) \phi^* \left(\frac{L}{L^*}\right)^{\alpha+1} \mathrm{e}^{-L/L^*} d\left(\log_{10}L\right).$$

The galaxy luminosity function may have different parameters for different populations and environments; it is not a universal function. One measurement from field galaxies is $\alpha=-1.25,\ \phi^* = 1.2 \times 10^{-2} \ h^3 \ \mathrm{Mpc}^{-3}$.

It is often more convenient to rewrite the Schechter function in terms of magnitudes, rather than luminosities. In this case, the Schechter function becomes:

$$n(M)~ dM = (0.4 \ \ln 10) \ \phi^*  \ [ 10^{ 0.4 ( M^* - M ) } ]^{ \alpha + 1}  \exp [ -10^{ 0.4 ( M^* - M ) } ] ~ dM .$$

Note that because the magnitude system is logarithmic, the power law has logarithmic slope $\alpha + 1$. This is why a Schechter function with $\alpha = -1$ is said to be flat.

Integrals of the Schechter function can be expressed via the incomplete gamma function

$$\int_a^b \left(\frac{L}{L^*}\right)^\alpha e^{-\left(\frac{L}{L^*}\right)} d \left(\frac{L}{L^*}\right)=\Gamma(\alpha+1,a)-\Gamma(\alpha+1,b)$$

Historically, the Schechter luminosity function was inspired by the Press–Schechter model. However, the connection between the two is not straight forward. If one assumes that every dark matter halo hosts one galaxy, then the Press-Schechter model yields a slope $\alpha\sim-3.5$ for galaxies instead of the value given above which is closer to -1. The reason for this failure is that large halos tend to have a large host galaxy and many smaller satellites, and small halos may not host any galaxies with stars. See, e.g., halo occupation distribution, for a more-detailed description of the halo-galaxy connection.
