= Hair of the dog (disambiguation) =

Hair of the dog is a colloquial English expression describing a cure or treatment for an alcohol-induced hangover.

Hair of the dog may also refer to:

- Hair of the Dog (film), a 1962 British comedy film
- Hair of the Dog Brewing Company, a microbrewery located in Portland, Oregon
- Hair of the Dog, Episode 148 of the Mythbusters television series

== Albums ==
- Hair of the Dog (album), a 1975 album by Nazareth
- Hair of the Dog, a 1989 compilation album by Tankard

== Songs ==
- "Hair of the Dog" (song), by Nazareth from the album of the same name
- "Hair of the Dog", by Mud from the 1975 album Use Your Imagination
- "Hair of the Dog", by Bauhaus from the 1981 album Mask
- "Hair of the Dog", by the Ramones from the 1986 album Animal Boy
- "Hair of the Dog", by The Poor from the 1994 album Who Cares
- "Hair of the Dog", by Loverboy from the 1997 album Six
- "Hair of the Dog", by Shooter Jennings from the 2006 album Electric Rodeo
- "Hair of the Dog", by Senses Fail from the 2008 album Life Is Not a Waiting Room
