= Gunnar Malmquist =

Swedish astronomer (1893–1982)

Karl Gunnar Malmquist (21 February 1893 – 27 June 1982) was a Swedish astronomer.

== Biography ==
Gunnar Malmquist was born in Ystad, where he completed his secondary school education before matriculating at the Lund University in 1911. He received his Ph.D. in 1921, was an amanuensis at the Lund Observatory 1915-1920 and a docent from 1920. He continued to work at the observatory in Lund until 1929, was observator at the Stockholm Observatory and taught at the Stockholm University College 1930–1939, and was Professor of Astronomy at the Uppsala University from 1939 until his retirement in 1959.

Malmquist was a student of Carl Charlier at Lund and became one of the best known members of the so-called "Lund school" in statistical astronomy. His work in that field led, among other things, to his observation of the Malmquist bias.

As professor at the Uppsala Astronomical Observatory he got interested in Schmidt telescopes and took the initiative, together with Åke Wallenquist, to get a large Schmidt telescope installed at Uppsala University's Kvistabergs Observatorium (Kvistaberg Observatory, 1964), at the time one of the largest Schmidt telescopes in the world with a mirror of 135 cm and a corrector plate of 100 cm. He also arranged for the university to construct a Schmidt telescope and build a dome at Mount Stromlo in Australia in 1956, "The Uppsala Southern Station".

The asteroid 1527 Malmquista was named after him.
