= Flarestar Observatory =

- Observatory code: 171
- Location: San Gwann, Malta
- Coordinates: 35°54′40″N 14°28′15″E
- Altitude: 126 m
- Established: 1999
- Website: http://flarestar.weebly.com

Telescopes
- Meade SSC-10: 0.25-m Schmidt-Cassegrain
- Location of Flarestar Observatory

Flarestar Observatory (obs. code: 171) is an astronomical observatory owned and operated and managed by astronomer and AAVSO-member Stephen M. Brincat. It is located near San Ġwann on the island country of Malta.

The observatory's principal instrument is a Meade 0.25-meter aperture Schmidt-Cassegrain Telescope (SCT), which is routinely employed for photometric observations of asteroids and monitoring variable stars.
