= Halo occupation distribution =

Parameter of the halo model of galaxy clustering

The halo occupation distribution (HOD) is a parameter of the halo model of galaxy clustering. The halo model provides one view of the large scale structure of the universe as clumps of dark matter, while the HOD provides a view of how galactic matter is distributed within each of the dark matter clumps. The HOD is used to describe three related properties of the halo model: the probability distribution relating the mass of a dark matter halo to the number of galaxies that form within that halo; the distribution in space of galactic matter within a dark matter halo; the distribution of velocities of galactic matter relative to dark matter within a dark matter halo.

== See also ==
- Dark matter
- Large-scale structure of the cosmos
- Galaxy formation and evolution
