= Hey-Hey-Hey Live Roskilde Festival 83 =

Live album by Warm Guns
- Released: 1983
- Recorded: Roskilde Festival July 1983
- Genre: Rock, New Wave
- Length: 36:06
- Label: Vertigo Records
- Producer: Jan Borges

Warm Guns chronology
Follow Your Heart Or Fall (1983)	Hey-Hey-Hey Live Roskilde Festival 83 (1983)	Hard Luck (1990)

Hey-Hey-Hey Live Roskilde Festival 83 is a live album by the Danish rock band Warm Guns, released in 1983.

Until 1983, the Roskilde Festival had rejected Warm Guns on the grounds that they didn't book Danish bands singing in English. However, the band finally got to play the festival's Rhythm Tent – a show recorded by the Danish National Radio. The band's Roskilde Festival debut was so successful, that the recording was used for the live album released in the fall of 1983.

== Track listing ==
=== Side 1 ===
1. "Rip Off" (Muhl/Hauschildt) – 3:53
2. "Nightcrawlers" (Muhl/Hauschildt) – 3:01
3. "Bedtime Story" (Muhl) – 2:50
4. "Every Teardrop Means A Lot" (Muhl) – 2:41
5. "Wonderkids" (Muhl/Muhl-Hauschildt) – 4:17
6. "I'll Get You" (Muhl/Muhl-Hauschildt) – 2:47

=== Side 2 ===
1. "Can't Give Or Take Anymore" (Muhl) – 3:26
2. "Wild Life" (Muhl) – 2:35
3. "Let's Go" (Muhl) – 3:16
4. "Someone Who Cares" (Muhl) – 3:52
5. "Under My Skin" (Muhl) – 3:22

== Personnel ==
- Lars Muhl – vocals
- Lars Hybel – guitar
- Jacob Perbøll – guitar
- Lars Kiehn – keyboards
- Kaj Weber – bass, backing vocals
- Troels Møller – drums, backing vocals

=== Production ===
- Robert Borges – producer
- Johnny – engineer
- Lars Poulsen – live mix
- Henrik Hambroe – lighting
- Johan Petersen – stage
- Kristian Mikael de Freitas Olesen – coverphoto
- Kristian Mikael de Freitas Olesen, Gorm Valentin & Muhl – additional photos
- Valle & Kiehn – cover design
