= Agitation Free =

German krautrock band

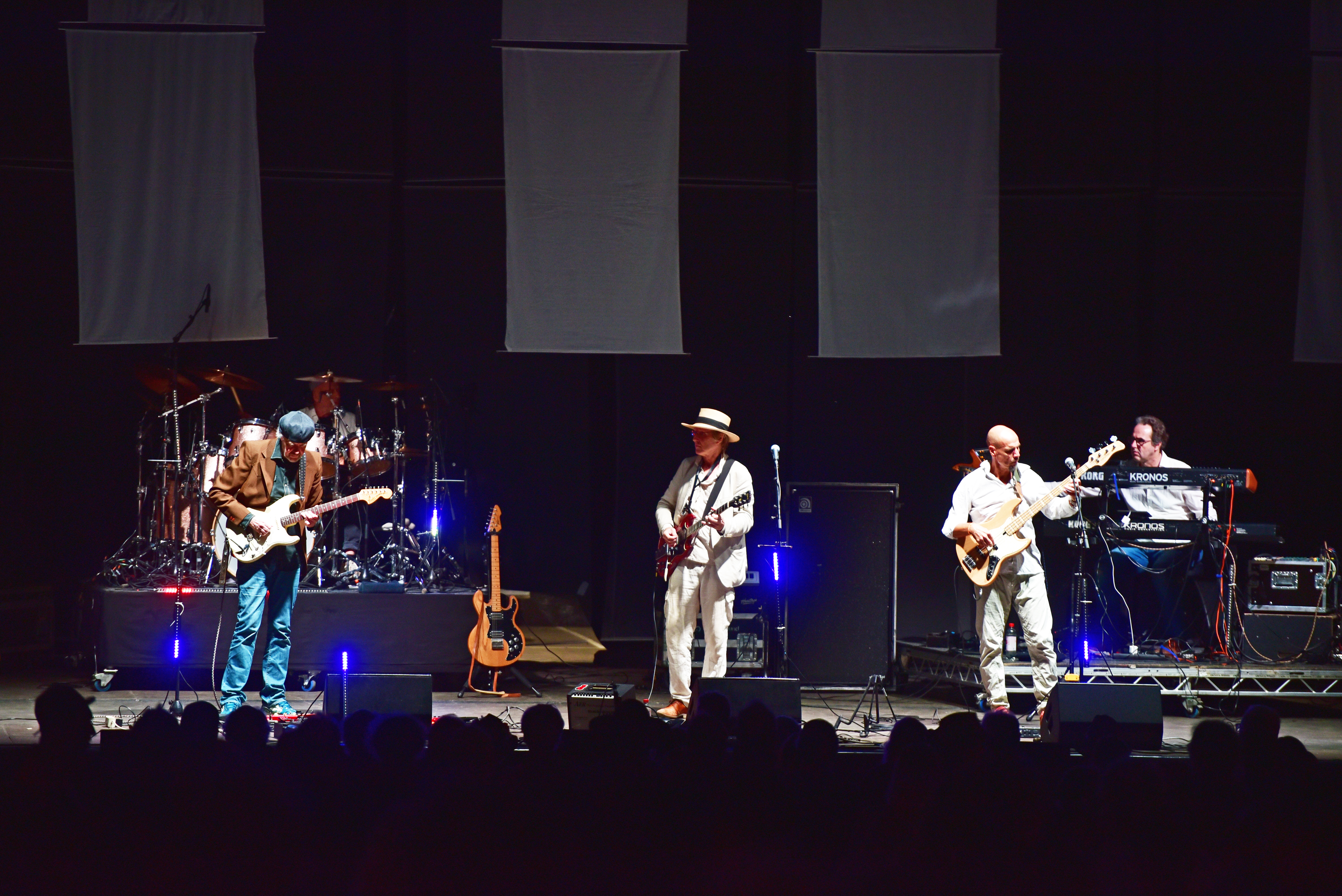
- Agitation Free performing in 2024

Background information
- Origin: Germany
- Genres: Experimental rock; krautrock; progressive rock; psychedelic rock; space rock
- Years active: 1967–1974, 1998, 2007, 2012–
- Labels: Vertigo, BMG, Barclay, Spalax, IRI, Prudence
- Past members: Michael Günther; Lutz Ulbrich; Christopher Franke; Lutz Ludwig Kramer; Axel Genrich; Jörg Schwenke; Burghard Rausch; Michael Hoenig; Stephan Diez; Gustl Lütjens

Agitation Free is a German experimental krautrock band formed in 1967 by Michael "Fame" Günther (bass guitar), Lutz "Lüül" Ulbrich (guitar), Lutz Ludwig Kramer (guitar) and Christopher Franke (drums).

== Name ==
They were initially called Agitation, a name they chose at random from a dictionary. The band had to change the name because another band with the same name already existed. Agitation Free was chosen based on a poster for a free show played in the early 1970s saying "Agitation Free" (meaning "free concert").

== History ==
After losing guitarist Ax Genrich to Guru Guru in 1970 (Genrich having replaced Kramer the same year) and drummer Franke to Tangerine Dream in 1971, the band recruited Jörg "Joshi" Schwenke (guitar), Burghard Rausch (drums) and Michael Hoenig (keyboards). They released their first album, Malesch, in 1972 on the Music Factory label. The album was inspired by their tour through Egypt, Greece and Cyprus, sponsored by the German Goethe Institute. Later that year, they performed at the 1972 Munich Olympics.

A second album was released in 1973, and guitarist Schwenke was replaced first by Stefan Diez, then Gustl Lütjens. The band disbanded in 1974.

Agitation Free reunited in 1998, with the 1974 line-up, and released River of Return in 1999. The band again reformed in 2007 for a series of concerts in Tokyo. In 2008, remastered CDs of their back catalogue were officially released, and in 2011 they released Shibuya Nights, recorded at their 2007 Tokyo concerts. In 2012, the band toured again to promote this album.

The band is included on the Nurse with Wound list.

== Musical style and sound ==
Agitation Free's music is psychedelic, experimental krautrock with elements of spaced-out ambient, experimental electronic and drone. The music for the most part consists of driving organ-patterned drone-like rock; seamless psychedelic cosmic musical textures with intricate musicianship and musical variety; hard, driving rock similar to Amon Düül II; and jamming that occasionally invokes the interplay and styles of Garcia, Weir and Lesh of The Grateful Dead and hints at a blues rock base not unlike The Allman Brothers Band. Many of their songs have a trance-inducing, psychedelic feel with sections of driving rock fueled by fiery and melodic moving guitar lines and solid, propelling and intricate drumming and a prominent bass line. All of Agitation Free's songs are instrumental apart from some recitation on "Haunted Island".

First Communication
A sample of the track "First Communication" from the album 2nd

Their first album Malesch features short interludes of recordings from Egypt. Their second, titled 2nd is more laid-back and upbeat, with longer structure, much more of an emphasis on traditional styled jamming like the Grateful Dead and a warmer and more straightforward sound. On Malesch the songs blend together to make a seamlessly flowing, tangential and uninterrupted musical journey, whereas on 2nd songs are more predictably structured, more varied in their sound and stand more as independent works.

Their sound is similar to, but fairly distinguishable from, other contemporary Krautrock bands such as Ash Ra Tempel, Amon Düül II, Guru Guru, Brainticket, Yatha Sidhra and Kalacakra, as well as the mixed-influence blues-based jam rock of The Grateful Dead and The Allman Brothers noticeable on 2nd, and slightly later and more symphonic bands like Asia Minor and Anyone's Daughter.

== Personnel ==
=== Members ===
- Lutz Ulbrich – guitars (1967–1974, 1998–1999, 2007, 2012–)
- Michael Günther – bass guitar (1967–1974, 1998–1999, 2007, 2012)
- Christopher Franke – drums (1967–1971)
- Lutz Ludwig Kramer – guitars (1967–1970)
- Michael Duwe – vocals (1967)
- Ax Genrich – guitars (1970)
- Jörg Schwenke – guitars (1970–1973)
- Michael Hoenig – keyboards, electronics (1971–1974, 2007, 2012–)
- Burghard Rausch – drums (1971–1974, 1998–1999, 2007, 2012–)
- Dietmar Burmeister – drums, percussion (1973)
- Stefan Diez – guitars (1973)
- Gustl Lütjens – guitars (1973–1974, 1998–1999, 2007, 2012–2013)
- Bernhard Arndt – keyboards (1974)
- Daniel Cordes – bass guitar (2012-)

=== Lineups ===
N.B. changes in bold

1967–1970	1970	1970–1971	1971–1973
**Lutz Ulbrich** – guitars; **Lutz Ludwig Kramer** – guitars; **Michael Günther** – bass guitar; **Christopher Franke** – drums	Lutz Ulbrich – guitars; Michael Günther – bass guitar; Christopher Franke – drums; **Axel Genrich** – guitars	Lutz Ulbrich – guitars; Michael Günther – bass guitar; Christopher Franke – drums; **Jörg Schwenke** – guitars	Lutz Ulbrich – guitars; Michael Günther – bass guitar; Jörg Schwenke – guitars; **Michael Hoenig** – keyboards, electronics; **Burghard Rausch** – drums
1973 spring	1973 mid	1973–1974	1974
Lutz Ulbrich – guitars; Michael Günther – bass guitar; Jörg Schwenke – guitars; Michael Hoenig – keyboards, electronics; Burghard Rausch – drums; **Dietmar Burmeister** – drums, percussion	Lutz Ulbrich – guitars; Michael Günther – bass guitar; Michael Hoenig – keyboards, electronics; Burghard Rausch – drums; **Stefan Diez** – guitars	Lutz Ulbrich – guitars; Michael Günther – bass guitar; Michael Hoenig – keyboards, electronics; Burghard Rausch – drums; **Gustl Lütjens** – guitars	Lutz Ulbrich – guitars; Michael Günther – bass guitar; Michael Hoenig – keyboards, electronics; Burghard Rausch – drums; Gustl Lütjens – guitars; **Bernhard Arndt** – keyboards
1975–1997	1998–1999	2000–2006	2007
**Disbanded**	Lutz Graf-Ulbrich – guitars, keyboards; Michael Günther – bass guitar; Burghard Rausch – drums; Gustl Lütjens – guitars, keyboards	**Disbanded**	Lutz Ulbrich – guitars; Michael Günther – bass guitar; Burghard Rausch – drums; Gustl Lütjens – guitars; **Michael Hoenig** – keyboards, electronics
2008–2011	2012	2013	2014–present
**Disbanded**	Lutz Graf-Ulbrich – guitars; Michael Günther – bass guitar; Burghard Rausch – drums; Gustl Lütjens – guitars; Michael Hoenig – keyboards, electronics	Lutz Graf-Ulbrich – guitars; Burghard Rausch – drums; Gustl Lütjens – guitars; Michael Hoenig – keyboards, electronics; **Daniel Cordes** – bass guitar	**Disbanded**

== Discography ==
- Malesch (1972)
- 2nd (1973)
- Last (released 1976, studio 1974 and live tracks 1971+1973)
- Fragments (released 1995 and again in 1996, studio 1974 and live 1971+1974)
- At the Cliffs of River Rhine aka Live '74 (released 1998, recorded live 1974) Garden of Delights
- The Other Sides of Agitation Free (released 1999, recorded in Berlin, 1974)
- River of Return (1999)
- Shibuya Nights (live February 2007 in Tokyo, released 2011 on Esoteric Recordings)
- Momentum (2023)
