= Hot Tracks =

Hot Tracks may refer to:

- Hot Tracks (album), the 1976 album by Nazareth
- Several song ranking lists published by Billboard magazine:
  - Hot Rap Tracks
  - Hot Digital Tracks
  - Hot Adult Contemporary Tracks
  - Hot Latin Tracks
  - Hot Gospel Tracks
- New York Hot Tracks, an American television series from 1983 to 1989
- Hot Tracks, a DJ remix service
