= Changes (Catapilla album) =

Studio album by Catapilla
- Released: 15 June 1972
- Recorded: 1971–72
- Genre: Progressive rock
- Length: 37:03
- Label: Vertigo
- Producer: Colin Caldwell

Catapilla chronology
Catapilla (1971)	Changes (1972)

Professional ratings
Review scores
Source	Rating
AllMusic	4/5 stars

Changes is the second album by the progressive rock band Catapilla.

== Track listing ==
All music written by Graham Wilson, Robert Calvert, and Anna Meek, except where noted. All lyrics written by Anna Meek.

Side one

1. "Reflections" – 12:06
2. "Charing Cross" – 6:45

Side two

3. "Thank Christ For George" – 12:07
4. "It Could Only Happen To Me" (music – Wilson, Calvert) – 6:45

== Personnel ==
- Anna Meek – vocals
- Carl Wassard – electric bass
- Graham Wilson – guitar
- Ralph Rolinson – organ, electric piano
- Robert Calvert – electric and acoustic saxophones
- Brian Hanson – drums
