= Exercises (album) =

Studio album by Nazareth
- Released: July 1972
- Studio: Trident Studios, London
- Genre: Soft rock; folk rock; blues rock
- Length: 35:04
- Label: Peg (original UK release); Mooncrest (first UK reissue); Mountain Records (1975 UK reissue); Warner Bros. (original US release); A&M (1981 US reissue); Philips (Germany & Netherlands); Vertigo (New Zealand)
- Producer: Roy Thomas Baker

Nazareth chronology
| Nazareth (1971) | Exercises (1972) | Razamanaz (1973) |

Professional ratings
Review scores
| Source | Rating |
|---|---|
| Allmusic | 2/5 stars |

Exercises is the second studio album by the Scottish hard rock band Nazareth, released in 1972. Although their music is most accurately described as "blues-tinged hard rock" (CD liner notes), this record is quite far from the band's more standard fare, featuring, quite surprisingly, a number of acoustic arrangements, several songs with orchestral strings, and traditional Scottish airs. Indeed, the album's "1692 (Glen Coe Massacre)" is about a real incident in Scottish history, namely, the massacre of Glencoe. The album is also significant for its Roy Thomas Baker production—only his third project, and well before his breakthrough works with Queen in the mid-seventies—and its oddly 'new wave' cover-art (designed by CCS Associates). An early version of the Razamanaz song, "Woke Up This Morning", also makes an appearance on Side 1. There were no cover versions on the album: it wouldn't be until their 10th studio album, No Mean City, that there was another album totally written by the band members.

== Track listing ==
All tracks are written by Pete Agnew, Manny Charlton, Dan McCafferty, Darrell Sweet.

Side one
| No. | Title | Length |
|---|---|---|
| 1. | "I Will Not Be Led" | 3:03 |
| 2. | "Cat's Eye, Apple Pie" | 3:04 |
| 3. | "In My Time" | 3:28 |
| 4. | "Woke Up This Morning" | 3:09 |
| 5. | "Called Her Name" | 4:32 |

Side two
| No. | Title | Length |
|---|---|---|
| 6. | "Fool About You" | 2:47 |
| 7. | "Love Now You're Gone" | 2:25 |
| 8. | "Madelaine" | 5:54 |
| 9. | "Sad Song" | 2:13 |
| 10. | "1692 (Glencoe Massacre)" | 3:59 |

== Personnel ==
Nazareth

- Dan McCafferty - vocals
- Darrell Sweet - drums, backing vocals
- Pete Agnew - bass guitar, acoustic guitar, backing vocals
- Manny Charlton - guitar, 12-string guitar, backing vocals

Additional musicians

- David Hentschel - synthesizer (A4, B2, B5)
- Jedd Lander - bagpipes (B5), harmonica (A2, B1)
- Colin Frechter - string arrangements (A1, B4, B5)

Technical

- Robert M. Corich - liner notes, remastering
- Laura Vallis - design
- Mike Brown - remastering
- Roy Thomas Baker - producer
- Dave Field - Logo Design
