= Bedtime Story (Warm Guns song) =

Single by Warm Guns

from the album Follow Your Heart or Fall
- B-side: "Love Waits for No One"
- Released: 1983
- Recorded: December 1982 – February 1983 Sweet Silence Studios, Copenhagen
- Genre: Rock, new wave
- Length: 2:59
- Label: Vertigo Records
- Songwriter(s): Lars Muhl
- Producer(s): Nils Henriksen

Warm Guns singles chronology
"'4 Heartbreakers Only (EP)'" (1982)	"Bedtime Story" (1983)

"Bedtime Story" is a song by the Danish rock band Warm Guns. It was released as a single from the band's 1983 album Follow Your Heart Or Fall.

The Danish pop rock band TV-2 covered the song in 1993 on the Lars Muhl tribute album From All of Us....

== Track listing ==
1. "Bedtime Story" (Muhl) – 2:59
2. "Love Waits for No One" (Muhl) – 3:42

== Personnel ==
- Lars Muhl – vocals, keyboards
- Lars Hybel – guitar
- Kaj Weber – bass
- Troels Møller – drums
- Pete Repete – keyboards
- Strings on "Love Waits For No One" arranged by Leif Pedersen
