= Robert Calvert (saxophonist) =

English saxophonist

Robert Calvert, also credited as Rob Calvert, is an English saxophonist, best known for his work with Catapilla, Spontaneous Music Ensemble and numerous offshoots of Gong, including Gilli Smyth and Daevid Allen. Calvert rejects categorization of his music, into jazz or other genres, concentrating on the spirit and meaning.

== Musical career ==
A founding member of progressive rock band Catapilla which was formed in the late 1960s, Calvert was one of one two constant members during the band's brief history, the other being guitarist Graham Wilson. He appears on both their albums, 1971's eponymous Catapilla and 1972's Changes.

In the 1970s Calvert studied improvised music with John Stevens, and Maggie Nicols and in 1975, he began appearing on John Stevens' albums, initially on free jazz band Spontaneous Music Ensemble's album SME + = SMO. Calvert's next two albums were Somewhere in Between (1976) and Mazin Ennit (1977) both by Steven's jazz-rock band John Stevens' Away, followed Steven's album Ah! (1977). In 1994 he appeared on John Stevens Dance Orchestra's A Luta Continua, but this had been recorded in 1977.

After a break, he returned in 1989 on two Mother Gong albums The Owl and the Tree and Wild Child, before appearing on Invisible Opera Company of Tibet's 1991 eponymous album. Remaining in the Gong circle he appeared on Gilli Smyth's 1993 album Every Witches Way, Mother Gong's She Made the World (1993), Eye (1994) Mother Gong (1994) and Tree in Fish (1994) He toured extensively with Gong and Mothergong throughout the 1990s

Since 1994 Calvert has played and improvised with the Howley Calvert George Trio, together with John Howley (better known as a painter) on piano and vocals, and Robert George on drums. The trio have performed widely, including tours of Poland in 1998 and 1999.

Calvert also began performing with Daevid Allen, including Allen and Harry Williamson's album Twenty Two Meanings (The Art Of Glissando Guitar Vol. 1) (1999).

== Discography ==
With Catapilla

- Catapilla (1971) Vertigo
- Changes (1972) Vertigo

With John Stevens

- SME + = SMO (1975) A Records
- Somewhere in Between (1976) Vertigo
- Mazin Ennit (1977) Vertigo
- Ah! (1990) Konnex Records
- A Luta Continua (1994) Konnex Records

With Mothergong

- The Owl and the Tree (1989) Demi Monde
- Eye (1994) Voiceprint
- Every Witches Way (1993) Voiceprint
- She Made the World (1993) Voiceprint
- Mother Gong (1994) Voiceprint
- Wild Child (1997) Spalax Music
- Tree in Fish (2004) Voiceprint

With Invisible Opera Company of Tibet

- Gorilla (1991) Voiceprint

With Glo

- Even as We (1995) GAS Records

Poetry

- Recoding Unamunos Quorum (1999) F..loose Productions

With Daevid Allen

- Twenty Two Meanings (1999) Gliss (with Harry Williamson)
- Gentle Genie (2004) Voiceprint

Compilations

- Passed Normal (1992) FOT Records (one track "Spiral Dance")
- The Best of Mother Gong (1997) Outer Music
- Australia Aquaria:She (2001) NMC Music
- Histories and Mysteries of Planet Gong (2004) Voiceprint
