= Sunny Jim Band =

British rock band in the 1970s and 80s

Sunny Jim Band was a British rock band in the late 1970s and early 1980s. They remained a performing band for almost a decade, and released two singles and a couple of albums between 1978 and 1981. Most of their work was done outside of the UK, largely in Continental Europe.

== History ==
The band was formed in Norwich, England in 1975. The guitarist and singer, Martin Allen and bass guitarist John C. Barry had met while studying for A levels at Norwich City College. The drummer and singer Jack Hazebroek, originally from the Netherlands but then living and working in Norwich, joined the duo from an advertisement in the Norwich Evening News.

The Sunny Jim Band were originally playing heavy 1970s funk a cross between The Meters, Creedence Clearwater Revival and Grand Funk Railroad. A self-financed single "Memories" / "Pretty Little Girl" was recorded at Nest Studios in Birmingham. Copies made their way to the Netherlands and resulted in the band leaving England for a Dutch tour in 1976.

The band soon based themselves in Amsterdam living at the H88 (Herengracht 88) bar and hotel. Didier Laget (discovered during the band's visit to Tours, France) joined to fill the missing lead guitar role in 1977. During 1976 and 1977, the band played regularly at Paradiso and Melkweg ("The Milky Way") Amsterdam, supporting Tom Robinson, and The Pixies. The Sunny Jim Band signed to the American impresario, Russ Carney's Tumasi Productions.

Groningen situated in the north of the Netherlands was a regular haunt for the band live during 1977, where they were approached by Herman Brood (who was often at their live shows), and who was also looking for a backing band at the time.

The band's first single "Thanks For The Music" / "Pretty Little Girl", was produced by Piet Souer and released by Phillips Holland in 1978. Jack Hazebroek left the band in 1978, and was replaced by drummer Jaap Vreenegoor. Sunny Jim Band started touring in West Germany and built up a reputation on the West-German live circuit. The band were becoming influenced by the wave of punk bands coming out of England. They were particularly influenced by The Police, Elvis Costello and by Herman Brood.

In 1979, Sierk Janszen replaced Jaap Vrenegoor on drums, joining in time to tour Hungary with the popular Hungarian band P.Mobil. They were the first Western band to play in Hungary since the Spencer Davis Group toured in the 1960s. Frank Henneke, the drummer of the Dutch band Turf, replaced Sierk Janszen who remained as part of the road crew.

Discovered in Hamburg at The Logo club by Ulf Krüger, the band were signed to Phonogram Germany in 1980, and recorded their first album, Maximum Pain, with Ulf Kruger as producer and Geoffrey Peacey as co-producer. The album was produced live in the studio in ten days in an effort to capture their live power. Frank Henneke was replaced on drums by a return to the band of Jaap Vrenegoor.

The single, "Mixed-Up" / "I Tried" was recorded in Germany, and released on the Vertigo label with Robert Jan Stipps producing. The band were looking for a more polished sound for their records, after being disappointed by the lack of positive reviews for Maximum Pain, and finally this led to Steve Nye being approached to produce their second LP, Jay.

German tours continued supporting Whitesnake, Joe Cocker and Stray Cats, and the band were recorded live in WDR Cologne TV studios and broadcast on the German television show Rockpalast.

The band returned to the UK to record their second album Jay in January, February and March 1981. This album was produced by Steve Nye at Air Studios in London, the recording engineers being Colin Fairley, and Steve Churchyard. Side two of the album opened with a reggae/glam rock fusion cover version of Bob Dylan's "Knockin' on Heaven's Door".

Sunny Jim Band supported The Boomtown Rats on a German tour in 1982, and the band continued in various versions including Lutz Oldemeier on drums until 1985.

John C. Barry and Martin Allen continued writing songs in the early 1980s, and briefly worked with Bruce Woolley. They were signed by EMI Cologne as The Graduates. Jack Hazebroek joined The Graduates sessions under guidance of Wolf Maahn. Icebox, Technological Revolution and The Good Things were recorded on the then new Mitsubishi digital tape system in Cologne.

John C. Barry left to pursue a career as an artist, lyricist and bassist in Berlin in 1986.

== Discography ==
=== Singles ===
- "Thanks For The Music" / "Pretty Little Girl" (1978) (Produced by Piet Souer for Philips)
- "Mixed Up" / "I Tried" (1980) (Produced by Robert Jan Stipps for Vertigo)

=== Albums ===
- Maximum Pain (1980) (Produced by Geoffrey Peacey and Ulf Krüger for Vertigo; Phonogram/Vertigo Germany 6435052)
- Jay (1981) (Produced by Steve Nye for Vertigo; Phonogram/Vertigo Germany 6435100)
