= Cinema (Nazareth album) =

Studio album by Nazareth
- Released: 22 February 1986
- Genre: Hard rock
- Length: 40:03
- Label: Vertigo
- Producer: Eddie Delana

Nazareth chronology
The Catch (1984)	Cinema (1986)	Snakes 'n' Ladders (1989)

Professional ratings
Review scores
Source	Rating
AllMusic	3/5 stars

Cinema is the sixteenth studio album by the Scottish hard rock band Nazareth, released in 1986 by Vertigo Records.

== Track listing ==
All tracks are written by Manny Charlton except where noted.

No.	Title	Writer(s)	Length
1.	"Cinema"	Agnew, Charlton, McCafferty, Sweet	4:41
2.	"Juliet"	Agnew, Charlton, McCafferty, Sweet	4:08
3.	"Just Another Heartache"		5:04
4.	"Other Side of You"		3:44
5.	"Hit the Fan"		3:37
6.	"One from the Heart"		4:24
7.	"Salty Salty"	Agnew, Charlton, McCafferty, Sweet	3:48
8.	"White Boy"		5:08
9.	"A Veteran's Song"	Agnew, Charlton, McCafferty, Sweet	5:29

Original CD bonus tracks
No.	Title	Writer(s)	Length
10.	"Telegram (Parts 1, 2 & 3)" (live from 'Snaz)	Chris Hillman, Roger McGuinn/Agnew, Charlton, McCafferty, Sweet	6:00
11.	"This Flight Tonight" (Joni Mitchell cover; live from 'Snaz)	Joni Mitchell	3:38

1997 Castle Communications bonus tracks
No.	Title	Writer(s)	Length
10.	"Just Another Heartache" (alternate version)		5:59
11.	"A Veteran's Song" (alternate version)	Agnew, Charlton, McCafferty, Sweet	5:46

2001 (30th anniversary) bonus tracks
No.	Title	Writer(s)	Length
12.	"White Boy" (edited version)		4:11
13.	"Cinema" (edited version)	Agnew, Charlton, McCafferty, Sweet	3:24

2011 Salvo bonus tracks – BBC Friday Rock Show 14.10.1984
No.	Title	Writer(s)	Length
10.	"Beggars Day" (Grin cover)	Nils Lofgren	4:11
11.	"Cocaine" (J.J. Cale cover)	J.J. Cale	3:55
12.	"Party Down"	Agnew, Charlton, McCafferty, Sweet	4:13
13.	"This Month's Messiah"	Agnew, Charlton, McCafferty, Sweet	5:23
14.	"This Flight Tonight" (Joni Mitchell cover)	Joni Mitchell	4:03
15.	"Bad Bad Boy"	Agnew, Charlton, McCafferty, Sweet	4:45
16.	"Teenage Nervous Breakdown" (Little Feat cover)	Lowell George	4:18

- The 2011 remastered CD release of Cinema was paired with The Catch

== Personnel ==
Band members

- Dan McCafferty – lead vocals
- Pete Agnew – bass, backing vocals
- Manny Charlton – guitars
- Darrell Sweet – drums, backing vocals

Other credits

- Eddie Delana – producer, engineer
- Calum Malcolm – emulator on "Cinema"
- Recorded at Pearl Sound Studios (Canton, Michigan), Cava Sound Workshops (Glasgow, Scotland), Castle Sound Studios (Pentcaitland, Scotland)
- Mixed at Jacobs Studios (Farnham, England)

== Charts ==
Chart (1986)	Peak position
Norwegian Albums (VG-lista)	18
