= No Mean City (album) =

Studio album by Nazareth
- Released: January 1979
- Studios: at Ballastowell Farm, Isle of Man
- Genre: Hard rock
- Length: 39:06
- Label: A&M
- Producer: Manny Charlton

Nazareth chronology
Expect No Mercy (1977)	No Mean City (1979)	Malice in Wonderland (1980)

Professional ratings
Review scores
Source	Rating
AllMusic	3/5 stars
Smash Hits	3/10

No Mean City is the tenth studio album by the Scottish hard rock band Nazareth, released in 1979. The album title comes from the 1935 novel No Mean City and features artwork illustrated by Rodney Matthews. With this record the band's sound was heavier, considering the addition of guitarist Zal Cleminson of The Sensational Alex Harvey Band. It sold very well at the time, with the main single "Star", preceded by "Whatever You Want Babe". The popularity of the album allowed the band to play with several big names such as Thin Lizzy, on their 1978/79 tour. It was their first album since their second release, Exercises in 1972, not to contain at least one cover song.

== Track listings ==
Side one
No.	Title	Writer(s)	Length
1.	"Just to Get into It"	Manny Charlton, Dan McCafferty, Pete Agnew, Darrell Sweet	4:24
2.	"May the Sunshine"	Charlton, McCafferty, Agnew, Sweet	4:55
3.	"Simple Solution (Parts 1 & 2)"	Zal Cleminson	4:59
4.	"Star"	Charlton, McCafferty	4:55

Side two
No.	Title	Writer(s)	Length
5.	"Claim to Fame"	Charlton	4:30
6.	"Whatever You Want Babe"	Charlton	3:42
7.	"What's in It for Me"	Charlton	4:19
8.	"No Mean City (Parts 1 & 2)"	Agnew, Charlton, Cleminson, McCafferty, Sweet	6:32

=== 30th anniversary bonus tracks ===
No.	Title	Writer(s)	Length
9.	"May the Sunshine" (single edit)	Agnew, Charlton, Cleminson, McCafferty, Sweet	3:31
10.	"Whatever You Want Babe" (single edit)	Manny Charlton	2:59
11.	"Star" (US Version)	Charlton, McCafferty	4:55
12.	"No Mean City" (alternate edit)	Agnew, Charlton, Cleminson, McCafferty, Sweet	3:32
13.	"Simple Solution" (edit)	Zal Cleminson	4:16

Earlier remasters included the song Greens as a bonus track. This is not available on the 30th Anniversary remaster of No Mean City, but is instead found on the same such remaster of Expect No Mercy.

=== 2010 remaster bonus tracks ===
No.	Title	Writer(s)	Length
9.	"May the Sunshine" (Single Edit)	Agnew, Charlton, Cleminson, McCafferty, Sweet	3:30
10.	"Snaefell"	Charlton, Zal Cleminson	3:36

== Personnel ==
=== Band members ===
- Pete Agnew – bass guitar, backing vocals
- Dan McCafferty – lead vocals
- Manny Charlton – guitars
- Zal Cleminson – guitars
- Darrell Sweet – drums

== Charts ==
Chart (1979)	Peak position
Canada Top Albums/CDs (RPM)	81
Norwegian Albums (VG-lista)	20
Swedish Albums (Sverigetopplistan)	33
UK Albums (Official Charts)	34
US Billboard 200	88

== Certifications ==
Region	Certification	Certified units/sales
Canada (Music Canada)	Gold	50,000^{^}
^{^} Shipments figures based on certification alone.
