= Malesch =

Studio album by Agitation Free
- Released: 1972
- Recorded: 1972, at Audio-Ton -Studio, Berlin
- Genre: Psychedelic rock; space rock
- Length: 40:06
- Label: Vertigo
- Producer: Wolfgang Sandner; Peter Strecker

Agitation Free chronology
Malesch (1972)	2nd (1973)

Professional ratings
Review scores
Source	Rating
Allmusic	4/5 stars

Malesch is the debut album by German rock group Agitation Free. It was released in 1972 on the Vertigo Records [Germany] label. It was reissued on CD in 1992 by the Spalax label and in 2001 by the Garden of Delights label, with another reissue in 2008 by Revisited Records. The album was inspired by the group's travels through Lebanon, Egypt, Greece, and Cyprus.

== Track listing ==
All songs written by Agitation Free.

Side one

1. "You Play for Us Today" – 6:15
2. "Sahara City" – 7:51
3. "Ala Tul" – 4:57

Side two

1. "Pulse" – 4:51
2. "Khan el Khalili" – 5:34
3. "Malesch" – 8:24
4. "Rücksturz" – 2:11

== Personnel ==
- Lutz "Lüül" Ulbrich – lead electric guitar (Gibson SG), twelve-string guitar, Bavarian zither, Hammond organ
- Michael Hoenig – EMS Synthi A, Vox Continental organ
- Jörg Schwenke – rhythm guitar (Fender Stratocaster)
- Michael Günther – Fender Jazz bass, live-tapes (Revox A77)
- Burghard Rausch – congas, drums, marimbaphone, timbales

Additional musicians

- Uli Pop – bongos on "You Play for Us Today"
- Peter Michael Hamel – Hammond organ
