= Catapilla =

English progressive rock band

- Cover of Catapilla's eponymous debut album.

Background information
- Origin: London, England
- Genres: Progressive rock, jazz rock, psychedelic rock
- Years active: 1970–72
- Label: Vertigo
- Past members: Anna Meek - Vocals; Robert Calvert - Saxophone; Dave Taylor - Bass; Graham Wilson - Guitar; Hugh Eaglestone - Saxophone; Thierry Rheinhardt - Woodwind; Malcom Frith - Drums; Carl Wassard - Bass; Ralph Rolinson - Keyboards; Brian Hanson - Drums

Catapilla was an English progressive rock band active in the early 1970s. They released two albums on the major record label Vertigo Records.

== History ==
The band was formed in 1970 in London, England. The original lineup consisted of saxophonists Robert Calvert and Hugh Eaglestone, drummer Malcolm Frith, bassist Dave Taylor, guitarist Graham Wilson, woodwinds player Thierry Rheinhardt, and vocalist Jo Meek. Jo Meek's time with the band was brief; she was replaced by her sister Anna by the time of the band's earliest live performances.

The band was discovered by Cliff Cooper of the Orange Music Electronic Company, who took on managing Catapilla and arranged for them to appear in a showcase event in front of an invited audience of music industry figures. Among them was Patrick Meehan, manager of Black Sabbath, who was sufficiently impressed to get Catapilla a recording contract with Vertigo Records. Meehan produced their first, eponymous album, released on Vertigo in late 1971. Following this release, the band set off on a Vertigo-sponsored tour of the UK, supporting Graham Bond and Roy Harper, which failed to earn them mainstream public recognition.

Following the tour, Eaglestone, Frith, Rheinhardt, and Taylor all left the band. The remnants of Catapilla reformed the group with the additions of Bryan Hanson (drums), Ralph Rolinson (keyboards) and Carl Wassard (bass), and returned to the studio to record their second album, Changes. It was released in 1972, again on Vertigo. The group disbanded shortly after the album's release.

Calvert went on to play in Gong off-shoots, The Invisible Opera Company of Tibet and Mother Gong with Daevid Allen and Gilli Smyth. Taylor formed the band Liar with Clive Brooks, ex-drummer with Egg. In the 1970s, Hugh Eaglestone set up a secondhand record shop, called Catapilla, in Exeter.

== Discography ==
- Catapilla (1971)
- Changes (1972)
- Embryonic Fusion (2022) previously unreleased 1970 rehearsal tape
