= 4 Heartbreakers Only =

EP by Warm Guns
- Released: 1982
- Recorded: Werner Studio, Copenhagen
- Length: 12:54
- Label: Vertigo Records
- Producer: Nils Henriksen

Warm Guns chronology
Wonderkids (1981)	4 Heartbreakers Only (1982)	Bedtime Story (1983)

4 Heartbreakers Only is an EP by Danish rock band Warm Guns, released in 1982.

The EP includes three new recordings and the previously released "The Young Go First". Danish singer Peter Belli recorded "Can't Give Or Take Anymore" in 1991 on the album "Yeah" with Danish lyrics as "Alt Hvad Jeg Har Kært" (Everything I Hold Dear).

== Track listing ==
=== Side 1 ===
1. "Can't Give or Take Anymore" (Muhl) – 3:26
2. "Wild Life" (Muhl) – 2:19

=== Side 2 ===
1. "The Young Go First" (Muhl) – 4:23
2. "Heart of Stone" (Jagger/Richards) – 2:46

== Personnel ==
- Lars Muhl – vocals, keyboards
- Lars Hybel – guitars
- Kaj Weber – bass
- Troels Møller – drums
- Jacob Perbøll – bass ("The Young Go First")
- Jens G. Nielsen – drums ("The Young Go First")
