= Billy Rankin (guitarist) =

Scottish guitarist

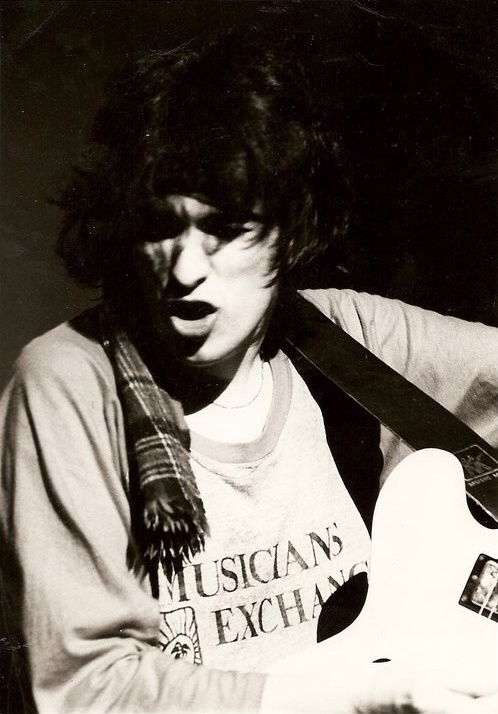
- Rankin in 1983

Background information
- Born: 25 April 1959 (age 66); Lennoxtown, Stirlingshire, Scotland
- Occupation: Musician
- Instruments: Guitar; vocals; keyboards
- Years active: 1974–present

William Rankin (born 25 April 1959) is a Scottish guitarist and singer active in the 1980s and 1990s. Best known for his work with Nazareth (1980–83 and 1990–94), he also had a successful solo career, including a US hit single "Baby Come Back". Rankin was part of multimedia group "Team Rock" prior to it going into administration in 2016.

== Biography ==
Rankin was born in Lennoxtown, Stirlingshire and educated at Kirkintilloch High School. Classically trained, he played cello at school and was granted a Scottish Region Music Scholarship in 1971, but preferred rock music to classical as he said in an interview, 'I was probably earning more than my cello teacher and learning more than he could ever teach me just by being in a rock band.' His first band Phase played the Scottish pub circuit when he was only 15 years old and, in 1978, he joined Zal Cleminson's Zal Band, featuring members of The Sensational Alex Harvey Band.

He joined Nazareth in 1980, replacing a departing Zal Cleminson, and appeared on their albums Snaz (1981), 2XS (1982) and Sound Elixir (1983) before leaving the band.

Rankin issued a solo album Growin' up Too Fast in 1984, and had a hit single that reached #52 on the Billboard Hot 100 with "Baby Come Back", taken from the album. A follow-up album called Crankin was released in Japan only in 1985, but with little success. He rejoined Nazareth in 1990, this time replacing original guitarist Manny Charlton, and recorded No Jive (1991) and Move Me (1994) before leaving the band again in 1994. As well as guitar, he also provided backing vocals and occasionally played keyboards.

After leaving Nazareth, he played at the Mick Ronson Memorial Concert, issued on CD in 1997. He also appears on a number of Nazareth retrospective and compilation albums, including Rock Ballads (1998), Back to the Trenches (2001), Live in Texas '81 (2004), The River Sessions (2004) and Hair of the Dog – Live (2007). His latest solo album Shake was released in 1999.

Rankin worked as a truck driver with the supermarket chain ASDA before getting a job as a presenter. Rankin was the breakfast presenter with 96.3 Rock Radio, Scotland's first classic rock station before the station was subject to a corporate acquisition, changing its name to Real Radio XS in the process. Rankin was not part of the reshuffle plans and parted company with the station in July 2012. Billy Rankin was part of "Team Rock Radio" and broadcast "The School of Rock" show, Saturday and Sunday mornings 9 am-midday (a streaming digital service).

== Discography ==
=== Solo singles ===
- "I Wanna Spend My Life with You"/"Jump Out the Window" (CBS 1979) Unreleased but mastered to vinyl
- "Can't Stop Now"/"Jump Out the Window" (CBS 1979)
- "Baby Come Back"/"Part of the Scenery" (A&M/Sony CBS 1983): Peaked at number 52 on the Billboard Hot 100 in May 1984.
- "Baby Come Back"/"Part of the Scenery"/"Baby's Got a Gun" 12-inch picture sleeve (A&M/Sony CBS 1983)
- "Call Me Automatic"- DJ Double sided single (A&M/Sony CBS 1983)
- "Come Out on Top"/b-side unknown (CBS/Sony Japan 1984)

=== Solo albums ===
- Growin' Up Too Fast (A & M Records 1983)
- Crankin' (A & M Records 1985)
- Shake (1999)

=== With Nazareth ===
- 'Snaz (1981)
- 2XS (1982)
- Sound Elixir (1983)
- No Jive (1991)
- Move Me (1994)

=== With Others ===
- Mick Ronson Memorial CD (1997) as a member of The Spiders from Mars with Joe Elliott, Trevor Bolder, Bill Nelson & Woody Woodmansey.
- A Tribute to Frankie Miller / "Drunken Nights in the City" track (2002)
- Runrig Mara (Chrysalis 1995) Backing vocals.
- "We're the Boys from East-end Park"/"Dunfermline, Dunfermline" (with Dan McCafferty, Gregor Able & team) for Dunfermline Athletic
- "Championi"/"Rangers Are Top" (with Brian Young) for Glasgow Rangers
- "Hamden Nights" (with Jay Crawford) for Scotland's National Team.

Rankin has also written Billy Rankin's School of Rock based on his stories and experiences over his career. Available online only.
