= Sound Elixir =

Studio album by Nazareth
- Released: June 1983
- Genre: Hard rock
- Length: 40:03
- Label: Vertigo
- Producer: Manny Charlton

Nazareth chronology
2XS (1982)	Sound Elixir (1983)	The Catch (1984)

Singles from Sound Elixir
- 1. "Where Are You Now" Released: July 1983

Professional ratings
Review scores
Source	Rating
AllMusic	3/5 stars

Sound Elixir is the fourteenth studio album by the Scottish hard rock band Nazareth, released in June 1983 by Vertigo Records.

== Track listing ==
All tracks are written by Pete Agnew, Manny Charlton, Dan McCafferty, Darrell Sweet and Billy Rankin.

No.	Title	Length
1.	"All Nite Radio"	4:08
2.	"Milk And Honey"	4:08
3.	"Whippin' Boy"	4:45
4.	"Rain On The Window"	4:23
5.	"Backroom Boys"	3:23
6.	"Why Don't You Read The Book?"	3:45
7.	"I Ran"	4:31
8.	"Rags To Riches"	3:27
9.	"Local Still"	3:32
10.	"Where Are You Now"	4:05

=== 1999 Castle Music Bonus Tracks ===
No.	Title	Length
11.	"On the Run" (B-side)	3:23
12.	"Where Are You Now" (alternate take)	4:32
13.	"Milk and Honey" (alternate edit)	4:20

=== 2002 30th Anniversary Bonus Tracks ===
No.	Title	Length
14.	"Whippin' Boy" (extended version)	5:16
15.	"All Nite Radio" (radio edit)	3:11

The 2011 remastered CD release of Sound Elixir was paired with 2XS, comprising tracks 12 through 21. No bonus material was added.

== Personnel ==
=== Band members ===
- Dan McCafferty – lead vocals
- Manny Charlton – guitars
- Billy Rankin – guitars, backing vocals, keyboards
- Pete Agnew – bass, backing vocals
- Darrell Sweet – drums, percussion

=== Other credits ===
- Calum Malcolm – engineer, keyboards
- Arthur Ward – art direction
- Matthew Curtis – graphic design

== Charts ==
Chart (1983)	Peak position
German Albums (Offizielle Top 100)	52
Norwegian Albums (VG-lista)	8
