= No Jive =

Studio album by Nazareth
- Released: 11 November 1991
- Recorded: 1991
- Studio: Cas Studios, Ingbert-Schüren, Germany
- Genre: Hard rock
- Length: 41:55
- Label: Mausoleum
- Producer: Nazareth

Nazareth chronology
Snakes 'n' Ladders (1989)	No Jive (1991)	From the Vaults (1993)

Professional ratings
Review scores
Source	Rating
Allmusic	link

No Jive is the eighteenth studio album by the Scottish hard rock band Nazareth, released in 1991. This album marked the return of guitarist Billy Rankin as a replacement for departing guitarist Manny Charlton.

== Track listing ==
All lyrics are written by Billy Rankin, Dan McCafferty, Pete Agnew, Darrell Sweet except where noted.

No.	Title	Writer(s)	Length
1.	"Hire and Fire"	Rankin, McCafferty, Agnew	5:10
2.	"Do You Wanna Play House"	Rankin, Agnew	5:01
3.	"Right Between the Eyes"	Rankin	3:06
4.	"Every Time It Rains"	Rankin	4:14
5.	"Keeping Our Love Alive"		3:18
6.	"Thinkin' Man's Nightmare"		4:01
7.	"Cover Your Heart"	Rankin	4:32
8.	"Lap of Luxury"		3:55
9.	"The Rowan Tree / Tell Me That You Love Me"		4:39
10.	"Cry Wolf"	Rankin, McCafferty	4:25

CD and compact cassette bonus track
No.	Title	Writer(s)	Length
11.	"This Flight Tonight" (Joni Mitchell cover, 1991 version)	Joni Mitchell	3:45

2002 (30th anniversary) bonus tracks
No.	Title	Writer(s)	Length
12.	"Hire and Fire" (edited version)	Rankin, McCafferty, Agnew	4:02
13.	"The Rowan Tree / Tell Me That You Love Me" (edited version)		6:15

== Personnel ==
Band members

- Dan McCafferty – vocals
- Billy Rankin – guitars
- Pete Agnew – bass guitar
- Darrell Sweet – drums, percussion

Other credits

- Peter Bizarre – keyboards
- Roland Peil – percussion
- Engineered by Ian Remmer
- Executive Producers – Micky Berresheim & Alfie Falckenbach
- Mixed by Mike Ging
- Sleeve design & artwork – Eric Philippe

== Charts ==
Chart (1991)	Peak position
Austrian Albums (Ö3 Austria)	31
Swiss Albums (Schweizer Hitparade)	36
