= From the Vaults (Nazareth album) =

Compilation album by Nazareth
- Released: 1993
- Genre: Hard rock
- Length: 74:04
- Label: Sequel
- Producer: Nazareth

Nazareth chronology
No Jive (1991)	From the Vaults (1993)	Move Me (1994)

From the Vaults is a compilation album by the Scottish hard rock band Nazareth, released in 1993.

Professional ratings
Review scores
Source	Rating
Allmusic	2/5 stars

== Track listing ==
No.	Title	Writer(s)	Length
1.	"Friends"	Agnew, Charlton, McCafferty, Sweet
2.	"If You See My Baby"	Agnew, Charlton, McCafferty, Sweet
3.	"Hard Living"	Agnew, Charlton, McCafferty, Sweet
4.	"Spinning Top"	Agnew, Charlton, McCafferty, Sweet
5.	"Love Hurts"	Boudleaux Bryant	4:44
6.	"Down"
7.	"My White Bicycle"
8.	"Railroad Boy"
9.	"You're the Violin"
10.	"Good Love"
11.	"Greens"
12.	"Desolation Road"
13.	"Heart's Grown Cold (Live)"
14.	"Razamanaz (Live)"
15.	"Hair of the Dog (Live)"
16.	"Talkin' to One of the Boys (Live)"
17.	"Morning Dew"	Bonnie Dobson
18.	"Juicy Lucy"
19.	"On the Run ( B-side, "Where are you now" ]"
