= First Shot Live =

Live album / Mini-album by Warm Guns
- Released: 1979
- Recorded: Recorded by Genlyd's Mobile Studio, 26 December 1978 at Århus Musikteater. Mixed at Werner Studio by Muhl, Werner Scherrer & Per Stan, 21 May 1979
- Genre: Rock, new wave
- Length: 26:04
- Label: Smash Records

Warm Guns chronology
First Shot Live (1979)	Instant Schlager (1980)

First Shot Live is a 1979 live mini-album by Danish rock band Warm Guns. It was the band's first release, recorded at their first-ever live performance.

At the concert, Warm Guns supported Danish punk band Lost Kids, whose female vocalist, Pussi Punk, guested on the song "Invisible Man". Per Møller left Warm Guns in 1979 and later recorded "Killing for Fun" with Anne Linnet Band on the album Cha Cha Cha (1982). Lars Muhl recorded "Elevator" on his solo album When Angels Fall (1991).

== Track listing ==
All songs by Lars Muhl, except "Killing for Fun" by Per Møller.

=== Side 1 ===
1. "Hip Shot" – 2:36
2. "Killing for Fun" – 3:47
3. "Elevator" – 3:16
4. "Never Lose Your Heart in the City" – 3:37

=== Side 2 ===
1. "Talk to Me" – 4:46
2. "Invisible Man" – 5:21
3. "Run 'N' Hide" – 2:38

== Personnel ==
- Lars Muhl – vocals, piano
- Lars Hybel – guitar, backing vocals
- Per Møller – guitar, backing vocals
- Jacob Perbøll – bass
- Jens G. Nielsen – drums

Additional musicians

- Pussi Punk – vocals on "Invisible Man"
