= 2XS =

Studio album by Nazareth
- Released: June 1982
- Recorded: January 1982
- Studios: AIR, Montserrat
- Genres: Hard rock; AOR
- Length: 40:53
- Label: Vertigo
- Producer: John Punter

Nazareth chronology
'Snaz (1981)	2XS (1982)	Sound Elixir (1983)

Singles from 2XS
- 1. "Love Leads to Madness" Released: 6 August 1982 (UK); 2. "Dream On" Released: August 1982 (US); 3. "Games" Released: 17 January 1983 (UK)

Professional ratings
Review scores
Source	Rating
AllMusic	3/5 stars

2XS is the thirteenth studio album by the Scottish hard rock band Nazareth, released internationally in 1982 by Vertigo Records, whereas its distribution was handled by NEMS International in the United Kingdom and by A&M Records in North America. Recorded and mixed at AIR Studios on the island of Montserrat, the album was produced and engineered by John Punter.

2XS peaked at number 122 in the United States during a ten-week chart stay, marking the last time Nazareth managed to reach the Billboard 200. Three singles were released from the album. The lead single, "Love Leads to Madness", reached number 3 in South Africa and the song itself was a US radio staple peaking at number 19 on the Billboard Mainstream Rock chart. While the second single, "Games", failed to chart elsewhere, the third one, "Dream On", was a European hit, reaching number 2 in Switzerland, number 4 in Austria and number 15 in Germany.

== Track listing ==
All tracks are written by Nazareth.

Side one
No.	Title	Length
1.	"Love Leads to Madness"	4:09
2.	"Boys in the Band"	3:07
3.	"You Love Another"	3:59
4.	"Gatecrash"	3:20
5.	"Games"	4:49

Side two
No.	Title	Length
6.	"Back to the Trenches"	4:03
7.	"Dream On"	3:28
8.	"Lonely in the Night"	4:23
9.	"Preservation"	4:03
10.	"Take the Rap"	2:42
11.	"Mexico"	2:52
Total length:		40:53

1999 Castle Music remastered edition bonus tracks
No.	Title	Length
12.	"Dream On" (single edit)	3:26
13.	"Juicy Lucy" (alternate edit)	4:10
14.	"Games" (alternate edit)	4:49
15.	"You Love Another" (alternate edit)	3:20
16.	"Love Leads to Madness" (alternate single version)	3:42
17.	"Dream On" (mono)	3:26
Total length:		63:40

2002 Eagle 30th anniversary edition bonus tracks
No.	Title	Length
18.	"Back to the Trenches" (extended version)	6:04
19.	"Love Leads to Madness" (alternate extended version)	7:12
Total length:		76:56

== Personnel ==
=== Nazareth ===
- Dan McCafferty – vocals
- Manny Charlton – lead guitar
- Billy Rankin – guitar, backing vocals
- John Locke – keyboards
- Pete Agnew – bass guitar, backing vocals
- Darrell Sweet – drums, percussion, backing vocals

=== Technical personnel ===
- John Punter – producer
- Mick Haggerty – art direction, design
- Jeffrey Kent Ayeroff – art direction
- Timothy Eames – design
- Aaron Rapoport – photography
- Hugh Brown – photography (inner sleeve)
- Frank Deluna – mastering (at A&M Mastering Studios, Los Angeles)

== Charts ==
Chart (1982)	Peak position
Canada Top Albums/CDs (RPM)	74
German Albums (Offizielle Top 100)	42
Norwegian Albums (VG-lista)	9
US Billboard 200	122
