= Follow Your Heart or Fall =

Studio album by Warm Guns
- Released: 1983
- Recorded: Sweet Silence Studios, Copenhagen Dec. 82. Feb. 83
- Genre: Rock, new wave
- Length: 34:09
- Label: Vertigo Records
- Producer: Nils Henriksen

Warm Guns chronology
| 4 Heartbreakers Only (1982) | Follow Your Heart or Fall (1983) | Hey-Hey-Hey Live Roskilde Festival 83 (1983) |

Album back cover
- (From left: Lars Muhl, Kaj Weber, Lars Hybel, Troels Møller)

Follow Your Heart or Fall is the third and last studio album by the Danish rock band Warm Guns, released in 1983.

== Track listing ==
=== Side 1 ===
1. "Bedtime Story" (Muhl) – 2:59
2. "I'm Just Blue" (Muhl) – 3:09
3. "Love Waits for No One" (Muhl) – 3:42
4. "The Girl's Not Happy" (Muhl-Hybel/Muhl) – 3:38
5. "Let's Go" (Muhl-Hybel/Muhl) – 3:11

=== Side 2 ===
1. "Every Teardrop Means a Lot" (Muhl) – 2:48
2. "Someone Who Cares" (Muhl) – 3:56
3. "The Night They Invented Champagne" (Hybel-Muhl/Muhl) – 3:40
4. "The Empty Bed" (Muhl) – 3:13
5. "You Can't Make It Alone" (Muhl) – 3:50

== Personnel ==
- Lars Muhl – vocals, keyboards
- Lars Hybel – guitar, bass on "The Girl's Not Happy"
- Kaj Weber – bass, backing vocals
- Troels Møller – drums, percussion, backing vocals

Additional musicians

- Pete Repete – keyboards
- Jeff King – backing vocals on "The Girl's Not Happy"
- Strings on "Love Waits for No One" arranged by Leif Pedersen

Production

- Warm Guns & Nils Henriksen – arrangements
- Nils Henriksen – producer
- Flemming Rasmussen – engineer
- Ernst M. Jørgensen – supervisor
- M.T. Purse – intellectual ideas on "I'm Just Blue"
- Lars "Fawlty" Paulsen – kicks and refreshments
- Finn Bjerre – cover design
- Thorkil Gudnason – cover photos
