= Instant Schlager =

Studio album by Warm Guns
- Released: May 1980
- Studio: Werner Studio, Copenhagen
- Genre: Rock, new wave
- Length: 32:11
- Label: Vertigo
- Producer: Robert Hauschildt & Warm Guns; Nils Henriksen

Warm Guns chronology
First Shot Live (1979)	Instant Schlager (1980)	Italiano Moderno (1981)

Instant Schlager is the first studio album by the Danish rock band Warm Guns, released in 1980 on Vertigo.

It was the band's second release, as they had released the live mini-album First Shot Live the year before. The single "The Young Go First" was a small national radio hit and an Australian Top 20 single. Danish singer Henning Stærk recorded "Under My Skin" on the EP Henning Stærk in 1981.

== Background and recording ==
Before recording, Warm Guns assembled in Lars Muhl's basement and began arranging the songs with the co-producer Robert Hauschildt. The musicians stood in a circle with two small amplifiers and tea towels placed over the drums. According to Lars Muhl, "From the center of the circle, Robert was in charge. Thanks to him, it was a tour de force of stripping a rockband to the bone. Anything unnecessary was removed."

Evenings were spent going over lyrical ideas, and three weeks later the arrangements were in place. In February 1980, Warm Guns began recording at Werner Studio in Copenhagen and recorded the album in two weeks. The album was produced by Robert Hauschildt and Warm Guns, except "The Young Go First" which was produced by Nils Henriksen.

== Release ==
The song "The Young Go First" became a small national hit and got radio airplay in Germany and Australia, where it reached the Australian top 20 singles chart. The Danish pop group Sound of Seduction covered the song in 1993 on the Lars Muhl tribute album From All of Us....

== Critical reception ==
According to the Danish magazine MM, the album title expressed the immediate intent in short form: utility music, pop, something that "hits". The band, and especially Muhl, was compared to Elvis Costello, as being "more Costello than Costello himself". MM wrote that Warm Guns performed just as easy, fast and determined as many English rock bands, and that the action and catchiness promised in the album title were evident in many of the songs - "The Young Go First", "Under My Skin" and "Shiny Shoes" - because of their semi-familiar melodies - "I’ll Get You", "She’s A Go Go Getter" and "Back In The 80′s", due to the band's aggression and dynamic energy.

== Track listing ==
=== Side 1 ===
1. Back In The 80s (Muhl) - 2:53
2. The Young Go First (Muhl) - 4:27
3. I'll Get You (Muhl/Muhl-Hauschildt) - 2:00
4. Welcome In The CIA (Muhl) - 2:14
5. Under My Skin (Muhl) - 3:19
6. She's A Go-Go-Getter (Muhl/Hauschildt) - 2:18

=== Side 2 ===
1. Run Deep (Muhl) - 2:48
2. Rip Off (Muhl/Hauschildt) - 2:33
3. Get Up (Muhl) - 2:34
4. Shiny Shoes (Muhl) - 2:52
5. Snapshot (Warm Guns) - 1:27
6. So What? (Muhl) - 2:41

== Personnel ==
- Lars Muhl - vocals, keyboards
- Lars Hybel - guitar, bass guitar
- Jacob Perbøll - guitar, bass guitar
- Jens G. Nielsen - drums

Production

- Robert Hauschildt & Warm Guns - producers
- Nils Henriksen - producer ("The Young Go First")
- Werner Scherrer - engineer
- Ernst Mikael Jørgensen - supervisor
- Poul Erik Veigaard - photographs
- Heartbreak Prod. - cover design
- ROCK ON - management
