= Italiano Moderno =

Studio album by Warm Guns
- Released: 1981
- Genre: Rock, new wave, power pop
- Length: 35:34
- Label: Vertigo Records
- Producer: Rod Huison; Nils Henriksen

Warm Guns chronology
Instant Schlager (1980)	Italiano Moderno (1981)	Follow Your Heart or Fall (1983)

Italiano Moderno is the second studio album by Danish rock band Warm Guns, released in 1981. It was re-released in 1982 with a new track list, replacing four album tracks with the EP 4 Heartbreakers Only.

== Track listing ==
=== Side 1 ===
1. "Arrivederci" (Muhl) – 2:50
2. "Wonderkids" (Muhl/Muhl-Hauschildt) – 3:33
3. "Big Sleep" (Muhl) – 2:23
4. "Golden Dreams" (Muhl-Hybel/Muhl) – 3:45
5. "Nightcrawlers" (Muhl/Hauschildt) – 2:48
6. "Public Enemies" (Muhl) – 2:59

=== Side 2 ===
1. "The Night Belongs to You" (Muhl) – 2:42
2. "Hard Luck" (Muhl) – 3:13
3. "Magic Motions" (Muhl) – 2:47
4. "Break or Bend" (Muhl) – 2:13
5. "Luckie Walkie" (Muhl) – 3:39
6. "No Alibi" (Muhl) – 2:39

== Recording ==
Produced by Rod Houison. Basic tracks recorded at Werner Studios, Copenhagen. Additional tracks and mix done at Eden Studios, London. Mixed by Rod Houison assisted by Nick Froome

"Arrivederci" and "Luckie Walkie" produced by Nils Henriksen and recorded at Werner Studios, Copenhagen.

== Personnel ==
- Lars Muhl: vocals & keyboards
- Lars Hybel: guitars & bass
- Frank Lorentzen: guitars & keyboards
- Jens G. Nielsen: drums

Additional musicians

- Georg Olesen: bass ("Big Sleep", "Golden Dreams", "Nightcrawlers", "Magic Motions")
- Jacob Perbøll: bass ("Arrivederci", "Luckie Walkie")

== Track listing (1982 version) ==
=== Side 1 ===
1. "Can't Give or Take Anymore" (Muhl) – 3:28
2. "Wild Life" (Muhl) – 2:20
3. "Luckie Walkie" (Muhl) – 3:39
4. "Arrivederci" (Muhl) – 2:50
5. "The Young Go First" (Muhl) – 4:23
6. "Heart of Stone" (Jagger/Richard) – 2:50

=== Side 2 ===
1. "Wonderkids" (Muhl/Muhl-Hauschildt) – 3:33
2. "Magic Motions" (Muhl) – 2:47
3. "Hard Luck" (Muhl) – 3:13
4. "Golden Dreams" (Muhl-Hybel/Muhl) – 3:45
5. "Nightcrawlers" (Muhl/Hauschildt) – 2:48
6. "Break or Bend" (Muhl) – 2:13
- Side 1 tracks 1, 2, 5 & 6 from 4 Heartbreakers Only (1982)
- Side 1 tracks 3 & 4 + side 2 tracks 1 – 6 from Italiano Moderno (original 1981 version)
- Side 1 track 5 originally from Instant Schlager (1980)
