= John Howley =

Australian painter (1931–2020)

John Howley (30 December 1931 – 25 May 2020) was an Australian painter whose core work is related to the Fantastic Art genre.

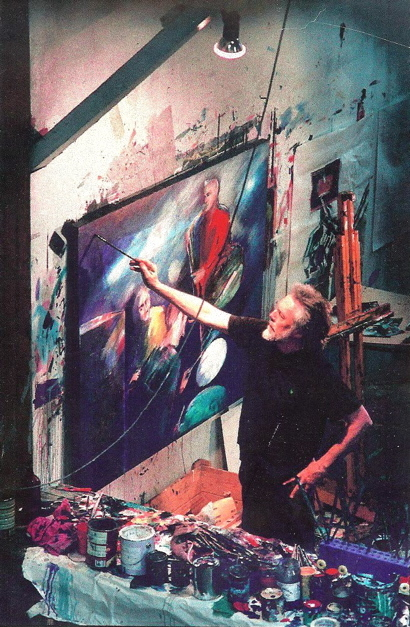
John Howley in his studio

== Life ==
Howley was born in Melbourne and studied at the National Gallery School of Art in Melbourne (1949–54) under Murray Griffin. In 1954 and again in 1955 he exhibited with Group Four, and in 1956 at Brummels Gallery, which established his reputation as an avant-garde artist. In 1962 he left Australia for England and spent 3 years traveling in Europe and North Africa painting and playing improvised music. From 1965 to 1967 he lived for two years in Tel Aviv, Israel where he had 5 exhibitions. In 1967 Howley returned to Melbourne and started to exhibit at Georges Mora's Tolarno Gallery. In 1980 he established with his Israeli curator wife The Acland Street Art Gallery that continued to exhibit Howley along with several other artists until 1989. The next year he moved to Williamstown, Melbourne dedicating himself to his painting and his involvement in improvised music. The artist now lives in countryside Victoria, Australia.

Howley painted 80 portraits and 2 commissioned murals Melbourne Airport and Royal Children's Hospital, Melbourne, (the latter mural with two other artists) and has exhibited in Germany, England, Israel, USA and Australia.

== Artistic development ==
In his student years John Howley's study of Renaissance masters was the first major influence in his work. Other influences from that time include German Expressionism and the Australian Social Realism movement. Howley's formal studies and draftsmanship enabled him to explore a variety of different expressive modes. His oeuvre is characterised by a constant search for new ways to comment on contemporary civilisation – mainly the transition into a technologically controlled society. His paintings create alternative and fantastic realities.

== Music ==
As well as a painter, Howley was also pianist and vocalist for the Howley, Calvert, George trio – an improvisational jazz trio, (1994–2007) including Robert Calvert on saxophone, and Robert George on drums.

== Death ==
John died on May 25, 2020, at the age of 88 in Bendigo, Australia from a brief illness.

== Bibliography ==
- 1968 McCulloch, Alan. Encyclopaedia of Australian Art, Melbourne : Hutchinson
- 1970 Bonython, Kym. Modern Australian Painting 1960–1970, Adelaide : Rigby
- 1971 Smith, Bernard. Australian Painting 1870–1970, Oxford
- 1971 Olsen, John. Review, Art in Australia, Vol. 8, No. 4
- 1975 Millar, Ronald. Civilized magic, Melbourne : Sorrett
- 1979 Germaine, Max. Artists and Galleries of Australia and New Zealand, Landsdowne
- 1980 Bonython, Kym. Modern Australian Painting, 1950–1975, Adelaide : Rigby
- 1981 Art & Artists of Australia, Macmillan Australia
- 1982 The Seventies : Australian paintings and tapestries from the collection of National Australia Bank, National Bank of Australasia
- 1983 Bonython, Kym. Modern Australian Painting, 1975–1980, Adelaide : Rigby
- 1988 The 1989 Australian Art Diary, Melbourne : Prendergast Publishers
- 1994 Drury, Neville. New Art Eight, Sydney : Craftsman House
- 1995 Heathcote, Christopher. A Quiet Revolution, Melbourne : Text Publishing
- 1998 Swingtime, Lawrence Wilson Art Gallery catalogue, Perth
- 1999 We Are Australian, Australian Multicultural Foundation

== Paintings ==
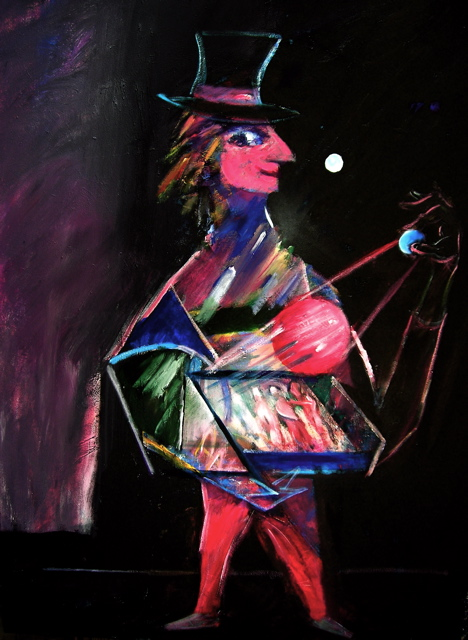
"We sell only the best people" (oil on canvas,123x91cm, 2006)

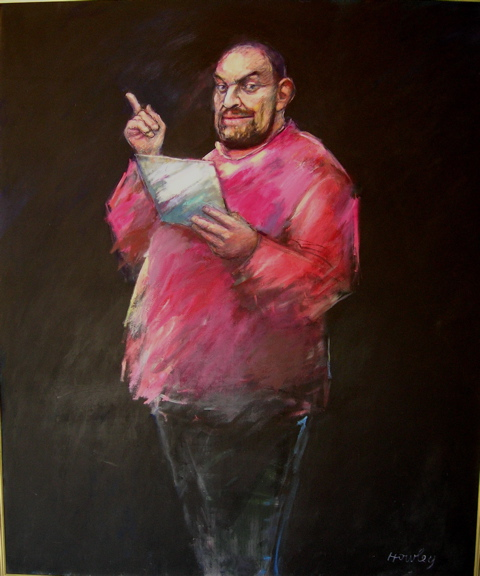
"Adrian Rawlins" (oil on canvas, 171x159cm, 1996)

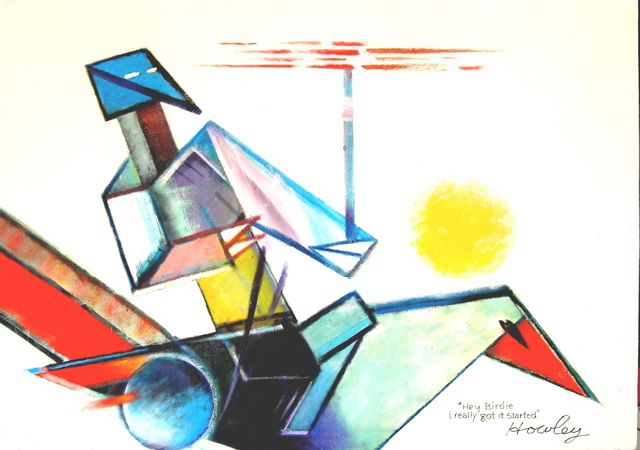
" Hey Birdie i really got it started" (acrylic on hardboard, 123x183cm, 1997)

"The hero" (oil on paper, 52x58cm, 1967)
