= The Catch (album) =

Studio album by Nazareth
- Released: September 1984
- Studio: Castlesound (Pencaitland, Scotland)
- Genre: Hard rock
- Length: 42:24
- Label: Vertigo
- Producer: John Eden

Nazareth chronology
| Sound Elixir (1983) | The Catch (1984) | Cinema (1986) |

Professional ratings
Review scores
| Source | Rating |
|---|---|
| AllMusic | 2/5 stars |

The Catch is the fifteenth studio album by the Scottish hard rock band Nazareth, released in 1984. The album in a way was a return to the Nazareth sound and tradition of the albums, covering songs like "Ruby Tuesday" and "Road to Nowhere".

== Track listing ==
All lyrics are written by Manny Charlton, Dan McCafferty, Pete Agnew, Darrell Sweet unless otherwise noted.

| No. | Title | Writer(s) | Length |
|---|---|---|---|
| 1. | "Party Down" | | 6:25 |
| 2. | "Ruby Tuesday" (The Rolling Stones cover) | Mick Jagger, Keith Richards | 3:27 |
| 3. | "Last Exit Brooklyn" | | 4:00 |
| 4. | "Moondance" | | 4:44 |
| 5. | "Love of Freedom" | | 4:28 |
| 6. | "This Month's Messiah" | | 5:16 |
| 7. | "You Don't Believe in Us" | | 6:37 |
| 8. | "Sweetheart Tree" | | 3:00 |
| 9. | "Road to Nowhere" | Gerry Goffin, Carole King | 4:01 |

=== 1997 Essential remaster bonus tracks ===
| No. | Title | Length |
|---|---|---|
| 10. | "Do You Think About It" (EP B-side) | 3:45 |
| 11. | "Last Exit Brooklyn" (edit) | 3:58 |

=== 2002 30th Anniversary bonus tracks ===
| No. | Title | Writer(s) | Length |
|---|---|---|---|
| 12. | "Ruby Tuesday" (extended single mix) | Jagger, Richards | 4:22 |
| 13. | "This Month's Messiah" (alternate version) | | 5:18 |

=== 2011 Salvo bonus tracks ===
| No. | Title | Length |
|---|---|---|
| 10. | "Do You Think About It" (EP B-side) | 3:45 |
| 11. | "Party Down" (single version) | 4:53 |

- The 2011 remastered CD release of The Catch was paired with Cinema

== Personnel ==
=== Band members ===
- Dan McCafferty – vocals
- Manny Charlton – guitars
- Pete Agnew – bass, guitars
- Darrell Sweet – drums

== Charts ==
| Chart (1984) | Peak position |
|---|---|
| German Albums (Offizielle Top 100) | 60 |
| Norwegian Albums (VG-lista) | 12 |
