= Warm Guns =

Danish band

- Warm Guns in 1980. From left: Jacob Perbøll, Jens G. Nielsen, Lars Hybel, Lars Muhl.

Background information
- Origin: Aarhus, Denmark
- Genres: Rock, new wave, power pop
- Years active: 1978–1984
- Labels: Vertigo; Smash
- Past members: Lars Muhl; Lars Hybel; Jens G. Nielsen; Jacob Perbøll; Per Møller; Frank Lorentzen; Kaj Weber; Troels Møller; Lars Kiehn

Warm Guns were a Danish band formed in Aarhus in 1978 by Lars Muhl. Influenced by punk and new wave in the late seventies, the band was often compared to artists like Elvis Costello. Among the band's more well-known songs were "The Young Go First" and "Wonderkids".

== History ==
Lars Muhl (vocals and keyboards) formed Warm Guns with Lars Hybel (guitar), Per Møller (guitar), Jacob Perbøll (bass) and Jens G. Nielsen (drums). The band played their first gig on 26 December 1978 at Århus Musikteater with the Danish punk band Lost Kids, among others. The concert was recorded and released in 1979 as the minialbum First Shot Live. Møller left Warm Guns the same year to play with Anne Linnet Band, after which the band continued as a four-piece.

1980 saw the release of their first studio album, Instant Schlager, released on PolyGram's Vertigo label. Songs like "The Young Go First" - an Australian Top 20 single and a small national radio hit - generated some interest in the band, but failed to make a greater impact.

Perbøll left the band around the turn of the year, while Frank Lorentzen (guitar and keyboards) became a new member. He contributed to the next studio album Italiano Moderno (1981) on which Georg Olesen (TV-2) helped out on bass. The album was recorded in Copenhagen and London with producers Nils Henriksen and Rod Huison. In 1981-82 Lorentzen left Warm Guns to join Bamses Venner, followed by Nielsen who left to focus on his regular band, Gnags.

With newcomers Kaj Weber (bass) and Troels Møller (drums) Warm Guns recorded the EP 4 Heartbreakers Only (1982) and third album Follow Your Heart Or Fall (1983). The album was recorded at Sweet Silence Studios in Copenhagen with Nils Henriksen producing. On the following tour an expanded lineup with Lars Kiehn (keyboards) and Jacob Perbøll (guitar) played the Roskilde Festival, where the live album Hey-Hey-Hey Live Roskilde Festival 83 (1983) was recorded.

After a 1984 tour, which included the band opening the Roskilde Festival, Warm Guns broke up at the end of the year. Lars Muhl in 1989: "The concert at Roskilde in '83 was our best so far and we got so many offers afterwards that we ended up out on the road again. That concert was supposed to be our farewell concert. "We couldn't sell records because we were an underground pop band, the kind of band you can't label. Before the '84 tour we had been struggling for a number of years without really achieving mainstream success. So things started to sour between us and we broke up after the tour."

After Warm Guns disbanded, Lars Muhl went on to a solo career, Lars Hybel played with The Intellectuals and C.V. Jørgensen, and Jacob Perbøll later joined Big Fat Snake.

== Discography ==
=== Albums ===
- Instant Schlager (1980)
- Italiano Moderno (1981)
- Follow Your Heart or Fall (1983)

=== Live albums ===
- First Shot Live (1979)
- Hey-Hey-Hey Live Roskilde Festival 83 (1983)

=== Compilations ===
- Hard Luck (1990)

=== EPs ===
- 4 Heartbreakers Only (1982)

=== Singles ===
- "Hip Shot" (1979)
- "The Young Go First" (1980)
- "Arrivederci" (1981)
- "Wonderkids" (1981)
- "Bedtime Story" (1983)
