= Eela Craig =

Austrian rock band

- Origin: Linz, Austria
- Genres: Rock music
- Years active: 1970–1988
- Labels: Virgin, Vertigo
- Members: Hubert Bognermayr (piano); Harald Zuschrader (guitar, recorder, saxophone); Gerhard Englisch (bass); Horst Waber (drums, percussion)); Heinz Gerstmair (guitar); Will Orthofer (vocals, saxophone)

Eela Craig was an Austrian rock band of the 1970s and 1980s, that combined progressive rock with jazz and classical music influences as well as Christian lyrics. The band's name is without known meaning.

== History ==
The band was founded in Linz in 1970, and recorded its first album, entitled Eela Craig, in 1971 with a circulation of 1,500. Critics compared this album with established bands such as Emerson, Lake & Palmer, King Crimson, Gentle Giant and Colosseum. The band had a few onstage performances with the Zürich Chamber Orchestra in 1972, which led to more performances in well-known opera houses of Italy, Germany and Austria, uncommon venues for a rock band at the time.

The band signed a contract with Virgin Records in 1975, to release a number of singles and albums, including the Christian concept album Missa Universalis, and a signature ethereal cover version of Chris de Burgh's "A Spaceman Came Travelling", both released in 1978.

Missa Universalis was a musical translation of a (Catholic) high mass, which embraced lyrics in Latin, German, English and French. The compositions resembled the works of Anton Bruckner, mixed with elements of rock and electronic music. The premiere was performed at the Brucknerfest of the city of Linz and received positive acceptance.

The band was largely inactive between 1982 and 1986, but the two founding members produced solo music under the Bognermayr/Zuschrader name with Bognermayr's own New Age label, Erdenklang. 1987 saw the release of three singles, which were targeted to match the contemporary pop music style. Eela Craig released their last album, Hit or Miss, in 1987.

On 17 November 1995, the band reunited for a one-time live performance in Linz. At the same time, Hubert Bognermayr published a compilation of the band's music entitled Symphonic Rock.

== Discography ==
=== Singles ===
- "Stories" / "Cheese" (1974)
- "A Spaceman Came Travelling" / "Heaven Sales" (1978)
- "Mo-bike Jive" / "Carry On" (1981)
- "Linz" / "Fühl mich so..." (1987)
- "Il Tempo..." / "Lovers in Love" (1987)
- "Weihnachtszeit" / (Instrumental) (1987)
- "Lord’s Prayer" / "Vaterunser" (1988)

=== Albums ===
- Eela Craig (1971)
- One Niter (1976)
- Hats of Glass (1977)
- Missa Universalis (1978)
- Virgin Oiland (1980)
- Hit or Miss (1988)

=== Compilations ===
- Symphonic Rock (1995)
