= Hubert Bognermayr =

Austrian composer

Hubert Bognermayr (6 April 1948 – 17 March 1999), was an Austrian composer and pioneer of electronic music.

Born in Linz, Bognermayr was one of the founders of the Ars Electronica festival in 1979. He was also founding member of the Austrian rock band Eela Craig, and founder of the Blue Chip Orchestra.

Starting from 1973 he held many live performances in opera houses and on classical festivals, some even premiered live on TV. At these occasions he often collaborated with well-known orchestras (e.g. Zurich, Vienna Festival, Hamburg State Opera, Salzburg). For Herbert von Karajan he created sound effects for use in opera productions (e.g. electronic bells in Parsifal, Salzburg 1980).

One early noteworthy production was the album 'Missa Universalis' (with Eela Craig, 1978). It was a concept album with complete music and texts for a Christian mass. Composition style was similar to Anton Bruckner, but using elements of modern Rock music and electronic music. It premiered highly acclaimed during the Brucknerfest in Linz.

Together with Harald Zuschrader he composed the work Erdenklang - computerakustische Klangsinfonie (Sound of Earth - computer acoustic sound symphony). It was performed entirely on the Fairlight CMI, and premiered during the Ars Electronica 1982, using five musical computers live on stage, together with a ballet.

The LP featured enthusiastic liner notes by Wendy Carlos, stating:

With the appearance of Erdenklang by Bognermayr and Zuschrader the medium of electronic music has crossed another threshold ... To me it has been a long tedious way for this to happen ... More than a medium is advanced. We might say that the symphony itself has come of age...

In 1984, Mike Oldfield noticed the ongoing success of the Erdenklang album and contacted him to help in sound programming for the Discovery tour.
