= The Owl and the Tree =

Studio album by Mother Gong & Daevid Allen
- Released: 1989
- Recorded: 1988
- Studio: Spring Studios, Melbourne, Australia
- Genre: Psychedelic folk, space rock
- Length: 50:54
- Label: Demi-Monde
- Producer: Robin Ayling, Harry Williamson

Mother Gong chronology
Fish in the Sky (1988)	The Owl and the Tree (1989)	Live 1991 (1991)

Professional ratings
Review scores
Source	Rating
AllMusic	4/5 stars
Classic Rock	7/10 stars

The Owl and the Tree is the 7th studio album of Mother Gong and was released in 1989.

== Track listing ==
1. "I Am a Tree" – 4:40
2. "Lament" – 3:36
3. "Hands" – 3:15
4. "Ally" – 4:11
5. "La Dea Madrí" – 7:05
6. "Owly Song" – 6:36
7. "I Am My Own Lover" – 14:31
8. "Love Poem" – 4:59
9. "Coda Wave" – 2:01

== Personnel ==
- Daevid Allen – vocal, glissando & acoustic guitars
- Gilli Smyth – speaking voice, spacewhisper & stillness
- Harry Williamson – synthesizers, keyboards, vocals
- Robert Calvert – breathing into microphones & saxophones
- Rob George – drums, percussions
- Conrad Henderson – bass guitar
- Tim Ayers – bass guitar
- Wandana Arrowheart – harmonium, voices
- Georgia O'hara – vocals

Production

- Robin Ayling – executive producer
- Paul Younghusband – layout design
