= Kirkintilloch High School =

Co-ed secondary school in Kirkintilloch, Scotland (UK)

Coordinates: 55.935°N 4.127°W

Kirkintilloch High school

Location
- Waterside Road; Kirkintilloch, East Dunbartonshire, G66 3PA; Scotland

Information
- Type: Comprehensive School
- Motto: In Deed and in Truth
- Established: 1973
- Local authority: East Dunbartonshire
- Head teacher: Maureen Daniel
- Teaching staff: 55+
- Gender: Co-educational
- Age: 11–12 to 16–18
- Enrollment: 581 in 2017
- Houses: 5 (Holmfield, Waverley, Solsgirth, Peel and Napier)
- Colours: Blue, white and black
- Feeder schools: Gartconner Primary; Harestanes Primary; Hillhead Primary; Oxgang Primary; Twechar Primary
- Website: http://www.kirkintilloch.e-dunbarton.sch.uk/

Kirkintilloch High School is a six-year co-educational secondary school located in the Oxgang area of Kirkintilloch, East Dunbartonshire, Scotland.

== School roll ==
There are around 600 pupils with an annual first year of five classes of up to thirty pupils each, all coming from six associated primary schools: Gartconner; Harestanes; Hillhead; Oxgang, Twechar and Craighead.

| School year | S1 | S2 | S3 | S4 | S5 | S6 | Total Roll | References |
|---|---|---|---|---|---|---|---|---|
| 2000/2001 | | | | | | | 754 | |
| 2001/2002 | | | | | | | 767 | |
| 2002/2003 | | | | | | | | |
| 2003/2004 | | | | | | | | |
| 2004/2005 | | | | | | | 705 | |
| 2005/2006 | | | | | | | 665 | |
| 2006/2007 | 119 | 124 | 123 | 142 | 89 | 51 | 648 | |
| 2007/2008 | 108 | 128 | 124 | 120 | 119 | 39 | 639 | |
| 2008/2009 | 111 | 109 | 129 | 122 | 97 | 63 | 632 | |
| 2009/2010 | 121 | 115 | 107 | 122 | 102 | 59 | 626 | |
| 2010/2011 | | | | | | | 619 | |
| 2011/2012 | | | | | | | | |
| 2012/2013 | | | | | | | 594 | |
| 2017/2018 | | | | | | | 581 | |

== Building ==
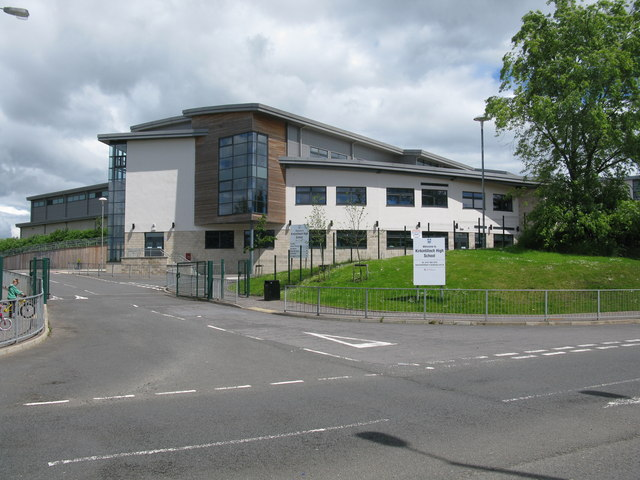
The 2009 building

As part of the Scottish Government's £134m PPP school's capital investment program, a new building opened to the pupils on 19 August 2009, replacing the thirty-six-year-old building on the same site. It was originally slated to open April 2009 but a 2008 fire delayed completion until August 2009.

== Alumni ==
- Andrew Crumey, novelist
- Billy Rankin, guitarist.
- James Scott, Hull City player.
- Gregg Wylde, Plymouth Argyle player.
