= Catapilla (album) =

Studio album by Catapilla
- Released: 1971
- Recorded: 1971
- Genre: Progressive rock
- Length: 48:50
- Label: Vertigo
- Producer: Patrick Meehan

Catapilla chronology
Catapilla (1971)	Changes (1972)

Professional ratings
Review scores
Source	Rating
AllMusic	2.5/5 stars

Catapilla is the first studio album by the progressive rock band Catapilla. It was released in 1971 on Vertigo Records.

== Track listing ==
All songs written by Graham Wilson, Thierry Reinhardt, Robert Calvert, Malcolm Frith, and Anna Meek.

Side one

1. "Naked Death" – 15:42
2. "Tumbleweed" – 3:57
3. "Promises" – 5:43

Side two

4. "Embryonic Fusion" – 24:08

== Personnel ==
- Anna Meek – vocals
- Dave Taylor – bass guitar
- Graham Wilson – guitar
- Hugh Eaglestone – tenor saxophone
- Robert Calvert – alto & tenor saxophones
- Thierry Rheinhardt – tenor & alto flute, clarinet
- Malcolm Frith – drums
