= Hot Tracks (album) =

Compilation album by Nazareth
- Released: 1976
- Genre: Hard rock
- Length: 44:22
- Label: A&M
- Producer: Manny Charlton

Nazareth chronology
Close Enough for Rock 'n' Roll (1976)	Hot Tracks (1976)	Play 'n' the Game (1976)

Professional ratings
Review scores
Source	Rating
Allmusic	3/5 stars

Hot Tracks is a compilation album by the Scottish hard rock band Nazareth, released in 1976. The album covers from 1973's Razamanaz album to 1976's Play 'n' the Game. The album also features a slightly longer version of "This Flight Tonight" and the single version of "I Want to Do Everything for You". A seven-inch EP featuring four tracks from the album ("Love Hurts", "This Flight Tonight", "Broken Down Angel" and "Hair Of The Dog") reached Number 15 in the UK singles chart in the following year.

== Track listing ==
All lyrics are written by Manny Charlton, Dan McCafferty, Pete Agnew, Darrell Sweet unless otherwise noted.

No.	Title	Writer(s)	Length
1.	"Love Hurts"	Boudleaux Bryant	3:51
2.	"Shanghai'd in Shanghai"		3:42
3.	"Carry Out Feelings"		3:16
4.	"Razamanaz"		3:47
5.	"Hair of the Dog"		4:02
6.	"I Want To (Do Everything for You)"	Joe Tex	3:10
7.	"This Flight Tonight"	Joni Mitchell	3:37
8.	"Broken Down Angel"		3:43
9.	"Born to Love"		3:55
10.	"My White Bicycle"	Ken Burgess, Keith West	3:30
11.	"Go Down Fighting"		3:03
12.	"Vancouver Shakedown"		4:01

== Personnel ==
- Dan McCafferty - vocals
- Darrell Sweet - drums
- Manny Charlton - guitar, producer
- Pete Agnew - bass guitar, guitar
- Pete York - tambourine

== Charts ==
Chart (1976)	Peak position
US Billboard 200	120
