= Vertigo Records =

British record label

- Parent company: Universal Music Group
- Founded: 1969; 57 years ago
- Distributors: Universal Music Germany; EMI Records (UK); Republic Records (U.S.)
- Genre: Hard rock; progressive rock; psychedelic rock; pop soul; heavy metal; glam metal (import bands)
- Country of origin: UK (originally); Germany (today)

Vertigo Records is a British record company. It was a subsidiary of the Philips/Phonogram record label, launched in 1969 to specialise in progressive rock and other non-mainstream musical styles. Today, it is operated by Universal Music Germany and the UK catalogue was folded into Mercury Records, which was absorbed in 2013 by Virgin EMI Records, which returned to the EMI Records name in June 2020.

== History ==
Alternate logo used in Canada

Vertigo was launched by Olav Wyper when he was Creative Director at Phonogram. It was launched as a competitor to labels such as Harvest (a prog subsidiary of EMI) and Deram (Decca). It was the home to bands such as Colosseum, Jade Warrior, Affinity, Ben and other bands from 'the "cutting edge" of the early-'70s British prog-folk-post-psych-early Heavy Metal circuit'. The first Vertigo releases came with a black and white spiral label, which was replaced with Roger Dean's spaceship design in 1973. Vertigo later became the European home to various hard rock bands signed to Mercury in North America, such as Bon Jovi, Rush and Kiss.

Vertigo is a division of Republic Records in the United States and operates as EMI Records in the UK, which in turn is a frontline music group operation of Universal Music UK. Island Records manages Vertigo's North American back catalogue that was once distributed by Mercury. In France, Vertigo France existed as a sub-label of Universal Music France's Barclay Records until 2014, when it was renamed as Island France. In Germany, Vertigo has merged with Capitol Records and is mainly used for German rock artists, and is named Vertigo/Capitol (notable contract exception here is Lewis Capaldi, he comes from UK). The label's legacy artists include Metallica (outside the US and Canada), Razorlight, Rush (Europe) and Dire Straits (except the US). More recent signings include The Rapture, The Killers (UK/Ireland), One Night Only, Amy Macdonald, Noisettes and Thee Unstrung between 2004 and 2005 and Kassidy in 2009. Black Sabbath returned to the label in 2013 (including the US and Canada for the first time via sister label Republic) until their dissolution in 2017 although former sister label Sanctuary Records Group acquired international rights to their back catalogue in the interim (the band were last on Vertigo in 1987).

Vertigo/Capitol (formerly Vertigo Berlin) is today the only active Vertigo label in the Universal Music Group. Artists signed to Vertigo/Capitol are Rammstein, Chvrches, Herbert Grönemeyer, Andreas Bourani, Haim, AnnenMayKantereit, Gzuz, Volbeat or Sportfreunde Stiller. Unheilig's sixth studio album Große Freiheit became one of the most successful albums in Germany of all time and sold 2 million albums. The collaboration album Palmen aus Plastik 2 by the rapper Bonez MC and RAF Camora stayed for 58 weeks at the German charts and was the first album to have 8 songs in the top 10 single charts in the release week. Shirin David's debut album Supersize was the first album by a female hip hop artist to chart at #1. Also international artists like Lana Del Rey, Dua Lipa, Sigrid or Scottish singer Lewis Capaldi launched their careers on Vertigo.

== Album discography ==
1969

- VO 1 Colosseum – Valentyne Suite
- VO 2 Juicy Lucy – Juicy Lucy
- VO 3 Manfred Mann Chapter Three – Manfred Mann Chapter Three

1970

- VO 4 Rod Stewart – An Old Raincoat Won't Ever Let You Down
- VO 5 Ancient Grease – Woman and Children First
- VO 6 Black Sabbath – Black Sabbath
- VO 7 Cressida – Cressida
- 6360 001 Fairfield Parlour – From Home to Home
- 6360 002 Gracious! – Gracious!
- 6360 003 Magna Carta – Seasons
- 6360 004 Affinity – Affinity
- 6360 005 Bob Downes – Electric City
- 6360 006 Uriah Heep – ...Very 'Eavy ...Very 'Umble
- 6360 007 May Blitz – May Blitz
- 6360 008 Nucleus – Elastic Rock
- 6360 009 Dr. Strangely Strange – Heavy Petting
- 6360 010 Jimmy Campbell – Half Baked
- 6360 011 Black Sabbath – Paranoid
- 6360 012 Manfred Mann Chapter Three – Volume 2
- 6360 013 Clear Blue Sky – Clear Blue Sky
- 6360 014 Juicy Lucy – Lie Back and Enjoy It
- 6360 015 Warhorse – Warhorse
- 6360 016 Patto – Patto
- 6360 017 Colosseum – Daughter of Time
- 6360 018 Beggars Opera – Act One
- 6360 019 Legend – Legend (Red Boot)
- 6360 020 Gentle Giant – Gentle Giant
- 6360 021 Graham Bond – Holy Magick
- 6360 023 Gravy Train – Gravy Train
- 6360 500 Rod Stewart – Gasoline Alley
- 6360 600 Lucifer's Friend - Lucifer's Friend
- 6360 601 Frumpy – All Will be Changed
- 6657 001 V/A – Vertigo Annual 1970; Double
- 6830 032 V/A – Vertigo Sampler July 1970

1971

- 6325 250 Thomas F Browne – Wednesday's Child
- 6342 010 Lighthouse – One Fine Morning
- 6342 011 Lighthouse – Thoughts of Moving on
- 6360 024 Keith Tippett – Dedicated to You, But You Weren't Listening
- 6360 025 Cressida – Asylum
- 6360 026 Still Life – Still Life
- 6360 027 Nucleus - We'll Talk About It Later
- 6360 028 Uriah Heep – Salisbury
- 6360 029 Catapilla – Catapilla
- 6360 030 Assagai – Assagai
- 6360 031 Nirvana – Local Anaesthetic
- 6360 032 Patto – Hold Your Fire
- 6360 033 Jade Warrior – Jade Warrior
- 6360 034 Ian Matthews – If You Saw Thro' My Eyes
- 6360 035 Manfred Mann Chapter Three – Manfred Mann Chapter Three (catalog number of Argentinian release)
- 6360 036 Juicy Lucy – Juicy Lucy (catalog number of Argentinian release)
- 6360 037 May Blitz – Second of May
- 6360 038 Daddy Longlegs – Oakdown Farm
- 6360 039 Ian Carr – Solar Plexus
- 6360 040 Magna Carta – Songs from the Wasties Orchard
- 6360 041 Gentle Giant – Acquiring the Taste
- 6360 042 Graham Bond – We Put Our Magick on You
- 6360 043 Tudor Lodge – Tudor Lodge
- 6360 044 (original catalog number of Dave Kelly's self-titled album, which was eventually released on Mercury)
- 6360 045 V/A – Heads Together, First Round
- 6360 046 Ramases – Space Hymns
- 6360 047 Black Sabbath – Black Sabbath (catalog number of Brazilian release)
- 6360 048 Dr. Z – Three Parts to My Soul
- 6360 049 Freedom – Through the Years
- 6360 050 Black Sabbath – Master of Reality
- 6360 051 Gravy Train – (A Ballad of) A Peaceful Man
- 6360 052 Ben – Ben
- 6360 053 Mike Absalom – Mike Absalom
- 6360 054 Beggars Opera – Waters of Change
- 6360 058 (original catalog number of Assagai's Zimbabwe, which was eventually released on Philips)
- 6360 060 Linda Hoyle – Pieces of Me
- 6360 062 Jade Warrior – Released

1972

- 6333 500/501 Aphrodite's Child – 666
- 6333 502 Aphrodite's Child – Break [Abbreviated single disc version of 666] [Brazil]
- 6357 007 Buffalo – Dead Forever...
- 6360 055 John Dummer – Blue
- 6360 056 Ian Matthews – Tigers Will Survive
- 6360 057 (unknown)
- 6360 059 Paul Jones – Crucifix in a Horse Shoe
- 6360 061 V/A – Superheavy Vol. 1 (label sampler released only in Peru)
- 6360 063 Legend – Moonshine
- 6360 064 Hokus Poke – Earth Harmony
- 6360 065 Ian Matthews - If You Saw Thru My Eyes German Reissue
- 6360 066 Warhorse – Red Sea
- 6360 067 Jackson Heights – 5th Avenue Bus
- 6360 068 Magna Carta – In Concert
- 6360 069 Gordon – Gordon
- 6360 070 Gentle Giant – Three Friends
- 6360 071 Black Sabbath – Vol 4
- 6360 072 Freedom – Is More Than a Word
- 6360 073 Beggars Opera – Pathfinder
- 6360 074 Catapilla – Changes
- 6360 075 (unknown)
- 6360 076 Ian Carr – Belladonna
- 6360 077 Jackson Heights – Ragamuffin's Fool
- 6360 078 V/A – Superheavy Vol. 2 (label sampler released only in Peru)
- 6360 079 Jade Warrior – Last Autumn's Dream
- 6360 080 Gentle Giant – Octopus
- 6360 081 Sensational Alex Harvey Band – Framed
- 6360 082 Status Quo – Piledriver
- 6360 602 Lucifer's Friend – Where the Groupies Killed the Blues
- 6360 603 Jackson Heights – 5th Avenue Bus [German release]
- 6360 604 Frumpy – By the Way
- 6360 605 Kravetz – Kravetz
- 6360 606 Brave New World – Impressions on Reading Aldous Huxley
- 6360 607 Agitation Free – Malesch
- 6360 608 Odin – Odin
- 6360 610 Tiger B. Smith – Tiger Rock
- 6360 700 Jim Croce – You Don't Mess Around with Jim
- 6360 800 The Fabulous Rhinestones – the Fabulous Rhinestones
- 6360 850 Pantheon – Orion
- 6641 055 Peter Michael Hamel – Hamel
- 6641 066 The Vertigo Trip; Double (Australia)
- 6641 077 Kraftwerk – Kraftwerk
- 6673 001 Aphrodite's Child – 666
- 6830 067 V/A – New Vertigo Popular Material
- FX 8602 Miki Curtis – The First Ear [Japan]
- FX 8603 Flied Egg – Dr. Siegel's Fried Egg Shooting Machine [Japan]
- FX 8605 Pico – ABC First
- FX 8606 Flied Egg – Goodbye
- FX 8607 Gypsy Blood – Gypsy Blood
- FX 8698 Katsumi Kahashi – Paris 2

1973

- 20X-4 Kiyoshi Hasegawa – Custom 20
- 6317 750 Aunt Mary – Janus
- 6325 251 Alan Stivell – Chemins de Terre
- 6325 252 Third World War – Third World War II
- 6357 101 Buffalo – Volcanic Rock
- 6360 083 John Dummer – Oobleedooblee Jubilee
- 6360 086 Jade Warrior - Eclipse Not released at the time
- 6360 087 Manfred Mann's Earth Band – Messin'
- 6360 088 The Spencer Davis Group – Gluggo
- 6360 089 Black Sabbath - 70's Pop Sound Spain
- 6360 090 Beggars Opera – Get Your Dog off Me
- 6360 091 Ian Carr with Nucleus – Labyrinth
- 6360 092 Jackson Heights – Bump 'n' Grind
- 6360 093 Magna Carta – Lord of the Ages
- 6360 094 Jade Warrior - 70's Pop Sound Spain
- 6360 095 Magna Carta - 70's Pop Sound Spain
- 6360 097 Decameron – Say Hello to the Band
- 6360 098 Status Quo – Hello!
- 6360 100 Ian Carr's Nucleus – Roots
- 6360 102 Spencer Davis Group - Gluggo German Issue
- 6360 103 The Sensational Alex Harvey Band – Next
- 6360 104 The Crickets – Remnants
- 6360 609 Atlantis – Atlantis
- 6360 611 Lucifer's Friend – I'm Just a Rock 'n' Roll Singer
- 6360 612 Between – And the Waters Opened
- 6360 613 Peter Michael Hamel – The Voice of Silence
- 6360 614 Atlantis – It's Getting Better
- 6360 615 Agitation Free – 2nd
- 6360 616 Kraftwerk – Ralf and Florian
- 6360 701 Jim Croce – Life and Times
- 6360 702 Jim Croce – I Got a Name
- 6360 900 Lindsay Marks – Lindsay Marks
- 6360 901 Shona Laing – Whispering Afraid
- 6366 100 Gentle Giant – In a Glass House
- 6366 101 (Note: For most countries outside the UK. UK release on WWA.) Black Sabbath – Sabbath, Bloody Sabbath
- 6414 851 Mantis – Turn Onto Music [New Zealand]
- 6499 693 Vangelis – Earth
- 6499 729 Magma – Mekanik Destruktiw Kommandoh [France]
- 6499 737 Nazareth – Loud 'n' Proud [France]
- 6499 738 Zao – Z=7L
- 6641 016 V/A - The Vertigo Trip (Australian Release Double Album)
- FX 8609 Kiyoshi Hasegawa – In Concert
- FX 8610 Captain Hiro and the Space Band – Lost or Found

1974

- 6303 103 Nazareth – Loud 'n' Proud [Germany]
- 6321 127 Van der Graaf Generator – The Aerosol Grey Machine [Netherlands]
- 6325 750 Magma – Kohntarkosz
- 6326 975 Freeway 75 – Boozed
- 6357 102 Buffalo – Only Want You for Your Body
- 6360 105 The Spencer Davis Group – Living in a Back Street
- 6360 106 Status Quo – Quo [Europe]
- 6360 107 Janne Schaffer – The Chinese
- 6360 110 Nucleus – Under the Sun
- 6360 112 The Sensational Alex Harvey Band – The Impossible Dream
- 6360 114 Brown's Home Brew – Together
- 6360 116 Thin Lizzy – Nightlife
- 6360 118 Janne Schaffer – Jan Schaffer's Second LP
- 6360 510 Van der Graaf Generator – The Aerosol Grey Machine [Italy]
- 6360 617 Tea – Tea
- 6360 618 Lucifer's Friend – Banquet
- 6360 619 Between – Dharana
- 6360 620 Kraftwerk – Autobahn
- 6360 621 Atlantis – Ooh Baby
- 6360 622 Hardin & York with Charlie McCracken – Hardin & York with Charlie McCracken
- 6360 625 The Chris Hinze Combination – Sister Slick
- 6360 852 Trace – Trace
- 6360 902 Dragon – Universal Radio
- 6366 104 The Groundhogs – Solid
- 6370 111 Greenslade – Spyglass Guest
- 6370 112 Chris Jagger – The Adventures of Valentine Vox the Ventriloquist
- 6370 401 Nazareth – Rampant
- 9102 001 Status Quo – Quo [UK]
- 9103 001 Gentle Giant – The Power and the Glory [France]
- 9103 200 Nazareth – Rampant [France]
- 9103 201 Baker Gurvitz Army – Baker Gurvitz Army

1975

- 6360 115 Ramases – Glass Top Coffin
- 6360 117 Status Quo – On the Level
- 6360 119 Nucleus – Snakehips Etcetera
- 6360 121 Thin Lizzy – Fighting
- 6360 122 The Sensational Alex Harvey Band – Live
- 6360 123 Streetwalkers – Downtown Flyers
- 6360 124 Nucleus – Alleycat
- 6360 126 City Boy – City Boy
- 6360 131 John Stevens' Away – John Stevens' Away
- 6360 623 Toto Blanke – Spider's Dance
- 6360 624 Virgo – Virgo
- 6360 626 Tea – The Ship
- 6360 629 Kraftwerk – Exceller 8
- 6360 630 Atlantis – Get on Board
- 6360 631 Cuby + Blizzards – Red, White, 'N Blue
- 6360 853 Kayak – Royal Bed Bouncer
- 6360 903 Dragon – Scented Gardens for the Blind
- 6366 113 Snafu – Situation Normal
- 6366 115 Black Sabbath – Sabotage
- 6370 405 Nazareth – Hair of the Dog
- 6370 407 Baker Gurvitz Army – Elysian Encounter [Germany]
- 6370 850 Far East Family Band – Nipponjin
- 9102 002 Status Quo – On the Level
- 9102 003 The Sensational Alex Harvey Band – Tomorrow Belongs to Me
- 9102 005 Streetwalkers – Downtown Flyers [France]
- 9103 202 Baker Gurvitz Army – Elysian Encounter [France]

1976

- 6357 103 Buffalo – Mother's Choice
- 6360 128 Status Quo – Blue for You
- 6360 129 Graham Parker – Howlin' Wind
- 6360 135 John Stevens' Away – Somewhere in Between
- 6360 136 City Boy – Dinner at the Ritz
- 6360 137 Graham Parker – Heat Treatment
- 6360 139 90 Degrees Inclusive – 90 Degrees Inclusive
- 6360 632 Bobby Stern & Head, Heart and Hands – Libra
- 6360 633 Lucifer's Friend – Mind Exploding
- 6360 634 Toto Blanke – Electric Circus
- 6360 635 Eela Craig – One Nighter
- 6360 636 Lady – Lady
- 6360 637 Tea – Tax Exile
- 6360 854 Kayak – The Last Encore
- 6360 855 Rick van der Linden and Trace – The White Ladies
- 6370 412 Nazareth – Close Enough for Rock 'n' Roll
- 6370 413 The Sensational Alex Harvey Band – The Penthouse Tapes [Germany]
- 6370 415 The Martin Ford Orchestra – Smoovin'
- 6370 416 Baker Gurvitz Army – Hearts on Fire
- 6370 417 The Sensational Alex Harvey Band – SAHB Stories
- 6370 418 Nazareth – Play 'n' the Game [Netherlands]
- 9102 006 Status Quo – Blue for You [France]
- 9102 007 The Sensational Alex Harvey Band – The Penthouse Tapes [UK]
- 9102 008 Thin Lizzy – Jailbreak
- 9102 009 Status Quo – Piledriver [France]
- 9102 010 Streetwalkers – Red Card
- 9102 012 Thin Lizzy – Johnny the Fox
- 9102 750 Black Sabbath – Technical Ecstasy [UK/France]
- 9103 204 Nazareth – Close Enough for Rock 'n' Roll [France]
- 9103 205 The Sensational Alex Harvey Band – The Penthouse Tapes [France]
- 9103 207 Nazareth – Play 'n' the Game [France]
- 9124 100 Black Sabbath – Technical Ecstasy

1977

- 6357 104 Buffalo – Average Rock 'n' Roller
- 6360 141 John Stevens' Away – Mazin Ennit
- 6360 145 Clover – Unavailable
- 6360 146 Magna Carta – Martin's Café
- 6360 147 The Sensational Alex Harvey Band – Vambo Rools 'Big Hits and Close Shaves
- 6360 148 Jerry Riopelle – Little Bit at a Time
- 6360 149 The Rumour – Max
- 6360 151 City Boy – Young Men Gone West
- 6360 152 Fairport Convention – The Bonny Bunch of Roses [Europe]
- 6360 155 Clover – Love on the Wire
- 6360 856 Kayak – Starlight Dancer
- 6370 421 SAHB – Fourplay
- 6370 425 Krazy Kat – Troubled Air
- 6641 580 Status Quo – Live!
- 6641 703 Streetwalkers – Live
- 9102 013 Streetwalkers – Vicious But Fair
- 9102 014 Status Quo – Rockin' All Over the World
- 9102 015 Fairport Convention – The Bonny Bunch of Roses [UK]
- 9102 016 Thin Lizzy – Bad Reputation
- 9102 017 Graham Parker and The Rumour – Stick to Me
- 9102 018 City Boy – Young Men Gone West [France]
- 9103 208 Nazareth – Expect No Mercy [France]
- 9124 360 Anthony Phillips – The Geese and the Ghost [Netherlands]

1978

- 6326 064 Vic Vea Band – Toad
- 6360 638 Eela Craig – Hats of Glass
- 6370 430 Joe Breen – More Than Meets the Eye
- 6413 506 Teaser – Teaser
- 6413 507 Kayak – Phantom of the Night
- 6641 797 Graham Parker and The Rumour – The Parkerilla
- 6641 807 Thin Lizzy – Live and Dangerous
- 9102 019 British Lions – British Lions
- 9102 020 Bethnal – Dangerous Times
- 9102 021 Dire Straits – Dire Straits
- 9102 022 Fairport Convention – Tipplers Tales
- 9102 024 Graham Parker and The Rumour – The Parkerilla [France]
- 9102 026/028 City Boy – Book Early
- 9102 027 Status Quo – If You Can't Stand the Heat...
- 9102 029 Bethnal – Crash Landing
- 9102 751 Black Sabbath – Never Say Die!
- 9103 210 Nazareth – No Mean City [France]
- 9124 101 Black Sabbath – Never Say Die! [Germany]
- 9124 361 Anthony Phillips – Wise After the Event [Germany]
- 9198 106 The Tapes – You Just Can't Sleep [Germany]
- 9198 187 Kayak – Phantom of the Night [Netherlands]

1979

- 6326 976 Flame Dream – Elements
- 6360 168 Graham Parker – Squeezing Out Sparks [Europe]
- 6360 169 Thin Lizzy – Black Rose: A Rock Legend
- 6360 170 Dire Straits – Communique [Europe]
- 6360 640 Duesenberg – Strangers
- 6360 642 Earth and Fire – Reality Fills Fantasy
- 6370 429 Voyager – Halfway Hotel [Germany]
- 6830 798 Transworld – The Makers of Music
- 9102 030 Graham Parker – Squeezing Out Sparks [UK]
- 9102 031 Dire Straits – Communique [UK]
- 9102 032 Thin Lizzy – Black Rose: A Rock Legend
- 9102 033 Geraint Watkins and the Dominators – Geraint Watkins and the Dominators
- 9102 034 Magna Carta – Seasons [French Reissue]
- 9102 035 Magna Carta – Lord of the Ages [French Reissue]
- 9102 036 City Boy – The Day the Earth Caught Fire
- 9102 037 Status Quo – Whatever You Want
- 9103 560 Anthony Phillips – Sides [France]
- 9124 362 Anthony Phillips – Sides
- 9198 430 Charlatan – Een Pa Hatten
- 9198 448 Jo Lemaire + Flouze – Jo Lemaire + Flouze

1980

- 6302 017 Black Sabbath – Heaven and Hell [Europe]
- 6302 057 Status Quo – Just Supposin'
- 6359 016 Paul Carrack – Nightbird
- 6359 024 City Boy – Heads are Rolling
- 6359 026 Dalek I – Compass Kumpas [Germany]
- 6359 030 Thin Lizzy – Chinatown
- 6359 034 Dire Straits – Making Movies
- 6359 039 Tom Robinson/Sector 27 – Sector 27
- 6360 177 Phil Lynott – Solo in Soho [Europe]
- 6360 641 Xynn – Dreams About Reality
- 6360 644 Schadel Bros. – You Can Match a Surprise
- 6370 432 Nazareth – Malice in Wonderland
- 6370 433 Voyager – Act of Love
- 6413 960 Kayak – Periscope Life
- 6435 050 Dreamworld – On Flight to the Light
- 6435 052 Sunny Jim Band – Maximum Pain
- 6435 059 Elephant – On My Feet Again
- 6435 060 Beggars Opera – Lifeline
- 6435 073 Xynn – Computed Man
- 6435 077 Duesenberg – Chapter IV
- 9102 038 Phil Lynott – Solo in Soho [UK]
- 9102 040 Def Leppard – On Through the Night
- 9102 752 Black Sabbath – Heaven and Hell [UK]
- 9198 686 Warm Guns – Instant Schlager

1981

- 6302 099 Nazareth – The Fool Circle
- 6302 104 Status Quo – Never Too Late
- 6302 119 Black Sabbath – Mob Rules
- 6302 151 Graham Bonnet – Line-Up
- 6302 162 Genesis – Abacab [Germany]
- 6344 234 Warm Guns – Italiano Moderno
- 6359 045 Def Leppard – High 'n' Dry
- 6359 066 City Boy – It's Personal
- 6359 083 Thin Lizzy – Renegade
- 6359 087 (Note: World outside of UK) Soft Cell – Non-Stop Erotic Cabaret
- 6367 016 Flame Dream – Out in the Dark
- 6367 025 Killer – Ladykiller
- 6435 094 Yello – Solid Pleasure
- 6435 100 Sunny Jim Band – Jay
- 6435 118 Elephant – Welcome to the China Shop
- 6435 123 Yello – Claro Que Si
- 6449 066 Kraftwerk - Elektro Kinetik
- 6650 006 Nazareth – 'Snaz

1982

- 6302 189 Status Quo – 1+9+8+2
- 6302 197 Nazareth – 2XS
- 6302 212 Brand X – Is There Anything About?
- 6359 099 ABC – The Lexicon of Love
- 6359 109 Dire Straits – Love Over Gold
- 6359 110 Soft Cell – Non Stop Ecstatic Dancing
- 6359 117 Phil Lynott – The Philip Lynott Album
- 6359 120 Marc and the Mambas – Untitled
- 6367 035 Killer – Thriller
- 6400 553 Warm Guns – 4 Heartbreakers Only
- 6435 144 Flame Dream – Supervision
- 6435 150 Novalis – Neumond
- 6435 156 Warning – Warning
- 6435 157 Nervous Germans – Nervosen Deutschen [Germany]
- 6435 160 Kriwanek & Vincent – Kriwanek & Vincent
- 6435 161 Tom Robinson – North by Northwest [Germany]
- 6483 334 T.V.C. – T.V.C.
- 6483 336 P.L.J. Band – Armageddon
- 6483 383 Made in Greece (Various Artists)
- 6650 008 Genesis – Three Sides Live [Germany]

1983

- 6359 124 Soft Cell – The Art of Falling Apart [Netherlands]
- 6435 197 Flame Dream – Travaganza
- 6650 009 Black Sabbath – Live Evil
- 810 427 TNT – TNT
- 810 457 Rao Kyao – Fado Bailado
- 811 014 Antonio Pinho Vargas – Outros Lugares
- 811 422 Jo Lemaire – Concorde
- 812 035 Satan Jokers – Les Fils Du Metal
- 812 142 Warm Guns – Follow Your Heart or Fall
- 812 166 Yello – You Gotta Say Yes to Another Excess
- 812 396 Nazareth – Sound Elixir
- 812 597 Novalis – Sterntaucher
- 812 882 Thin Lizzy – Life
- 814 090 Warning – Electric Eyes
- 814 286 Nervous Germans – Summer of Love
- 814 287 Genesis – Genesis [outside UK/Ireland/US/Canada]
- 814 363 Twelve Drummers Drumming – Twelve Drummers Drumming
- 814 396 Edoardo Bennato – E Arrivato Un Bastimento [Switzerland]
- 814 480 African Music (Various Artists)
- 814 661 ABC – Beauty Stab
- 818 018 Warm Guns – Hey-Hey-Hey
- VERS 2 Def Leppard – Pyromania
- VERL 3 Thin Lizzy – Thunder and Lightning
- VERL 4 Mark Knopfler – Local Hero
- VERS 5 Dio – Holy Diver
- VERD 6 Thin Lizzy – Life [Ireland]
- VERL 7 Coney Hatch – Outta Hand
- VERL 8 Black Sabbath – Born Again
- VERL 9 Kiss – Lick It Up
- VERH 10 Status Quo – Back to Back

1984

- 818 244 Dire Straits – Alchemy: Dire Straits Live
- 818 313 Satan Jokers – Trop Fou Pour Toi
- 818 416 ATC – Cut in Ice
- 818 430 Cherry – Als je dat maar weet
- 818 436 Soft Cell – This Last Night in Sodom
- 818 865 TNT – Knights of the New Thunder
- 818 947 Status Quo – Live at the N.E.C.
- VERH 12 Rush – Grace Under Pressure
- VERL 13 Lita Ford – Dancin' on the Edge
- VERL 14 Bon Jovi – Bon Jovi
- VERL 15 John Illsley – Never Told a Soul
- VERL 16 Dio – The Last in Line
- VERH 17 Mark Knopfler – Cal
- VERL 18 Kiss – Animalize
- VERL 20 Nazareth – The Catch
- VERH 42 Warlock – Burning the Witches

1985

- 822 820 Yello – Stella
- VERL 19 Randy California – Restless
- VERL 23 Coney Hatch – Friction
- VERL 24 Bon Jovi – 7800 Fahrenheit
- VERH 25 Dire Straits – Brothers in Arms
- VERL 26 Keel – The Right to Rock
- VERH 28 Warlock – Hellbound
- VERH 30 Dio – Sacred Heart
- VERH 31 Rush – Power Windows
- VERH 32 Kiss – Asylum

1986

- 830 300 Nazareth – Cinema
- VERH 29 Black Sabbath featuring Tony Iommi – Seventh Star
- VERL 33 Keel – The Final Frontier
- VERH 34 Frankie Miller – Dancing in the Rain
- VERH 36 Status Quo – In the Army Now
- VERH 37 Cinderella – Night Songs
- VERH 38 Bon Jovi – Slippery When Wet
- VERH 41 Warlock – True as Steel

1987

- 830 813 Ad Visser – Hi-Tec Heroes
- 830 821 Extrabreit – Sex After 3 Years in a Submarine
- VERH 39 TNT – Tell No Tales
- VERH 43 IQ – Nomzamo
- VERH 44 Tony MacAlpine – Maximum Security
- VERH 45 Jeff Paris – Wired Up
- VERH 46 Dio – Dream Evil
- VERH 47 Rush – Hold Your Fire
- VERH 48 Mortal Sin – Mayhemic Destruction
- VERH 49 Kiss – Crazy Nights
- VERH 50 Warlock – Triumph and Agony
- VERH 51 Black Sabbath – The Eternal Idol
- VERH 52 Tom Kimmel – 5 to 1
- VERH 53 Mark Knopfler – The Princess Bride

1988

- 836 596 1 Rata Blanca – Rata Blanca
- VERH 55 L.A. Guns – L.A. Guns
- VERH 57 China – China
- VERH 58 Status Quo – Ain't Complaining
- VERH 59 Cinderella – Long Cold Winter
- VERH 60 Vinnie Moore – Time Odyssey
- VERH 61 Metallica – ...and Justice for All
- VERH 62 Bon Jovi – New Jersey
- VERH 64 Dire Straits – Money For Nothing (Compilation)

1989

- 838 016 Doro – Force Majeure
- 838 592 L.A. Guns – Cocked & Loaded
- 838 913 Kiss – Hot in the Shade
- 842 098 Status Quo – Perfect Remedy
- 842 247 China – Sign in the Sky

1990s

- 846 033 Dio – Lock Up the Wolves
- 846 194 Doro – Doro
- 846 322 New Wave of British Heavy Metal '79 Revisited (Various Artists) [Canada]
- 846 908 Scorpions – Crazy World [Europe]
- 848 018 Cinderella – Heartbreak Station
- 848 341 Status Quo – Rock 'Til You Drop
- 510 022 Metallica – Metallica
- 510 102 Doro – True at Heart
- 510 146 All About Eve – Touched by Jesus
- 510 160 Dire Straits – On Every Street
- 510 230 Big Country – No Place Like Home
- 512 818 Treat – Treat
- 517 367 Status Quo – Live Alive Quo
- 514 309 Doro – Angels Never Die
- 518 252 Texas – Ricks Road
- 518 486 Dio – Strange Highways
- 518 866 Kerbdog – Kerbdog
- 526 804 Doro – Machine II Machine
- 514 732 Mark Knopfler – Golden Heart
- 532 618 Metallica – Load
- 536 409 Metallica – Reload
- 538 351 Metallica – Garage Inc.
- 546 797 Metallica – S&M

2000s

- 06024 9865 Metallica – St. Anger
- 9865465 The Rapture – Echoes
- 986680-3 Razorlight – Up All Night
- 987538-5 The Killers – Hot Fuss
- 9870970 Thee Unstrung – Psycho [7" single]
- 06025 1703 Razorlight – Razorlight
- 06025 1706 The Rapture – Pieces of the People We Love
- 1706 722 The Killers – Sam's Town
- 9856 134 Dirty Pretty Things – Waterloo to Anywhere
- 9877 358 Boy Kill Boy – Civilian
- 173 212-4 Amy Macdonald – This is the Life
- 1751 052 Tarja Turunen – My Winter Storm
- 175 183-9 One Night Only – Started a Fire
- 9841 570 Noisettes – What's the Time Mr. Wolf?
- 00602 5177 Metallica – Death Magnetic
- 1748 292 Boy Kill Boy – Stars and the Sea
- 1761 130 Johnny Flynn & The Sussex Wit – A Larum
- 1768 177 Noah and the Whale – Peaceful, the World Lays Me Down
- 177 236-7 Dirty Pretty Things – Romance at Short Notice
- 1785 121 The Killers – Day & Age
- 1789 891 Razorlight – Slipway Fires
- 1792 832 Noisettes – Wild Young Hearts
- BSAV 6971 Black Sabbath – Alternate Version 69-71

2010s

- 00602 5275 Unheilig – Grosse Freiheit
- 06025 2731 Shout Out Louds – Work
- Stromae – Cheese
- 06025 2742 Tarja – What Lies Beneath
- 06025 2754 Aloe Blacc – Good Things
- 2746 005 Brandon Flowers – Flamingo
- 275 381 4 Volbeat – Beyond Hell/Above Heaven
- HOPESTCJ1 Kassidy – Hope St.
- 2745 135 Chase & Status – No More Idols
- 530731 Metallica – Beyond Magnetic
- 60252 7815 Lou Reed and Metallica – Lulu
- 06025 2796 Unheilig – Lichter der Stadt
- 3718548 Soundgarden – King Animal
- 3735427 Black Sabbath – 13
- 3748162 2raumwohnung – Achtung Fertig
- 06025 3789 Klangkarussell – Netzwerk
- 3756342 Dua Lipa – Dua Lipa
- 0602577019036 Within Temptation – Resist
