= Play 'n' the Game =

Studio album by Nazareth
- Released: November 1976
- Studios: Le Studio (Morin-Heights, Quebec)
- Genres: Hard rock; AOR
- Length: 37:34
- Label: A&M
- Producer: Manny Charlton

Nazareth chronology
Hot Tracks (1976)	Play 'n' the Game (1976)	Expect No Mercy (1977)

Professional ratings
Review scores
Source	Rating
AllMusic	2.5/5 stars

Play 'n' the Game is the eighth studio album by Scottish hard rock band Nazareth, released in November 1976.

== Track listing ==
All tracks are written by Manny Charlton, Dan McCafferty, Pete Agnew, Darrell Sweet unless otherwise noted.

Side one
No.	Title	Writer(s)	Length
1.	"Somebody to Roll"		3:55
2.	"Down Home Girl" (Alvin Robinson cover)	Artie Butler, Jerry Leiber	5:04
3.	"Flying"		4:20
4.	"Waiting for the Man"		4:47

Side two
No.	Title	Writer(s)	Length
5.	"Born to Love"		3:58
6.	"I Want To (Do Everything for You)" (Joe Tex cover)	Joe Tex	4:18
7.	"I Don't Want to Go On Without You" (The Drifters cover)	Bert Berns, Jerry Wexler	3:46
8.	"Wild Honey" (The Beach Boys cover)	Brian Wilson, Mike Love	3:04
9.	"L.A. Girls"		3:52

=== 30th Anniversary Bonus Tracks 2006 ===
No.	Title	Writer(s)	Length
10.	"Good Love" (B-side)		3:51
11.	"I Don't Want To Go On Without You" (edited alternate take)	Bert Berns, Jerry Wexler	3:23
12.	"Waiting for the Man" (edited alternate take)		6:12
13.	"Somebody to Roll" (edited version)		3:30
14.	"Born to Love" (edited version)		3:33

== Personnel ==
=== Band members ===
- Dan McCafferty - vocals
- Manny Charlton - guitar
- Pete Agnew - bass guitar, guitar, background vocals
- Darrell Sweet - drums, percussion, background vocals

=== Other credits ===
- Nick Blagona - engineer
- Bob Ludwig - mastering
- Mike Brown - remastering
- Robert M. Corich - liner notes, remastering
- Laura Vallis - design

== Charts ==
Chart (1976)	Peak position
Canada Top Albums/CDs (RPM)	14
Swedish Albums (Sverigetopplistan)	14
US Billboard 200	75

== Certifications ==
Region	Certification	Certified units/sales
Canada (Music Canada)	Gold	50,000^{^}
^{^} Shipments figures based on certification alone.
