= Kalacakra =

German psychedelic rock band

Kalacakra was a 1970s German psychedelic rock underground band formed by the duo Claus Rauschenbach and Heinz Martin. Their sound carried a heavily eastern influence, with a lot of flute, sitar and percussions, and their style has been described as "mantric acid folk." "Kalacakra" refers to a Tibetan Buddhist concept of "time-cycles." The band released its only album, Crawling To Lhasa, in 1972. They recorded in German.

The album was re-released on CD in 2001 by Garden of Delights, featuring two bonus tracks absent from the 1972 release.

In 2002 after a gap of 30 years another album was released by the reformed band. The album was called "Peace" and contained a more New Age fare compared to the 1972 Krautrock.
