= Expect No Mercy =

Studio album by Nazareth
- Released: November 1977
- Recorded: Le Studio (Morin-Heights, Quebec)
- Genre: Hard rock
- Length: 35:20
- Label: Mountain
- Producer: Manny Charlton

Nazareth chronology
Play 'N' the Game (1976)	Expect No Mercy (1977)	No Mean City (1979)

Singles from Expect No Mercy
- 1. "Gone Dead Train" Released: 1978; 2. "Shot Me Down" Released: 1978; 3. "Place in Your Heart" Released: 1978

Professional ratings
Review scores
Source	Rating
AllMusic	3/5 stars
The Rolling Stone Album Guide	.5/5 stars

Expect No Mercy is the ninth studio album by Scottish hard rock band Nazareth, released in 1977. The original version was rejected by the label and these versions were the bonus tracks on the Salvo CD. The originally released version saw the reintroduction of a heaviness after the two previously more laid back albums and the tracks were noticeably shorter with only the final track clocking in at over four minutes.

== Track listing ==
All tracks are written by Manny Charlton, Dan McCafferty, Pete Agnew, Darrell Sweet unless otherwise noted.

Side one
No.	Title	Writer(s)	Length
1.	"Expect No Mercy"		3:27
2.	"Gone Dead Train"	Jack Nitzsche, Russ Titelman	3:44
3.	"Shot Me Down"	Manny Charlton	3:29
4.	"Revenge Is Sweet"	Manny Charlton	3:04
5.	"Gimme What's Mine"		3:45

Side two
No.	Title	Writer(s)	Length
6.	"Kentucky Fried Blues"		3:08
7.	"New York Broken Toy"		3:37
8.	"Busted"	Harlan Howard	3:40
9.	"Place in Your Heart"	Manny Charlton	3:01
10.	"All the King's Horses"	Charlton, McCafferty	4:23

=== 30th Anniversary Edition Bonus Tracks ===
All lyrics are written by Manny Charlton, Dan McCafferty, Pete Agnew, Darrell Sweet except indicated unless otherwise noted.

No.	Title	Writer(s)	Length
11.	"Greens" (B-Side)		2:50
12.	"Desolation Road" (B-Side)		2:58
13.	"Gone Dead Train" (Edited Version)	Jack Nitzsche, Russ Titelman	3:31
14.	"Expect No Mercy" (Alternate Version)		2:54
15.	"Place in Your Heart" (Alternate Edited Version)	Manny Charlton	4:31
16.	"Kentucky Fried Blues" (Edited Version)		2:49
17.	"Expect No Mercy" (Live)		3:19

=== Salvo Records Remaster Bonus Tracks ===
All lyrics are written by Manny Charlton, Dan McCafferty, Pete Agnew, Darrell Sweet except indicated unless otherwise noted.

No.	Title	Writer(s)	Length
11.	"Kentucky Fried Blues" (First Version)		3:17
12.	"Gone Dead Train" (First version)		3:24
13.	"Shot Me Down" (First version)	Manny Charlton	3:44
14.	"Greens"		4:16
15.	"Life of a Dog"		3:49
16.	"New York Broken Toy" (First Version)		2:49
17.	"Revenge Is Sweet" (First Version)	Manny Charlton	3:07
18.	"Desolation Road"		3:09
19.	"Can't Keep a Good Man Down"		4:18
20.	"Moonlight Eyes"		2:48

== Personnel ==
=== Band members ===
- Dan McCafferty - vocals
- Darrell Sweet - drums
- Pete Agnew - bass guitar, guitar
- Manny Charlton - guitar, producer

=== Other credits ===
- Nick Blagona - engineer
- Mike Brown - remastering
- Mick Carpenter - project coordinator
- Robert M. Corich - liner notes, coordination, remastering, research
- Joseph Geesin - liner notes
- Hugh Gilmour - reissue design
- Bill Sosin - photography
- Frank Frazetta - cover painting

== Charts ==
Chart (1977)	Peak position
Canada Top Albums/CDs (RPM)	78
US Billboard 200	82

== Certifications ==
Region	Certification	Certified units/sales
Canada (Music Canada)	Gold	50,000^{^}
^{^} Shipments figures based on certification alone.
