= Aarhus Amtstidende =

Newspaper published in Aarhus, Denmark (1866–1965)

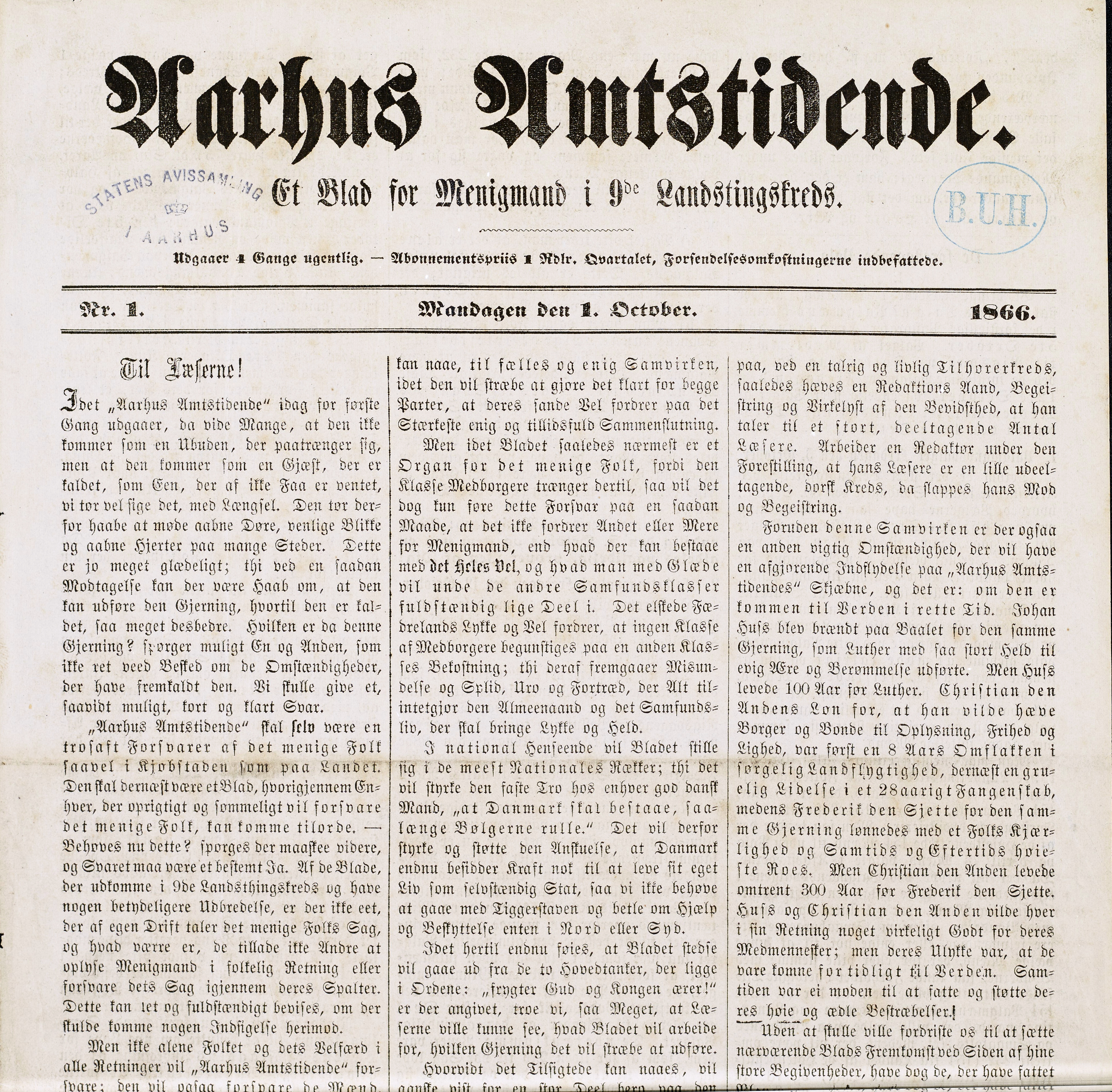
- Type: Cover page dated 1866
- Founded: 1 October 1866
- Ceased publication: 11 November 1965
- Language: Danish
- Headquarters: Aarhus
- Country: Denmark

Aarhus Amtstidende was a newspaper which was published in Aarhus between 1866 and 1965. During its long existence it adopted various political stances. It was started as a leftist publication, but then it became affiliated with the Venstre party.

== History and profile ==
The first issue of Aarhus Amtstidende was published on 1 October 1866. Its founders were Lars Bjørnbak, a leftist figure, and JCN Wistoft, a merchant. The reason for the establishment of the paper was Lars Bjørnbak's opposition to the constitutional revision carried out in the same year. Bertel Jensen was the editor of the paper. During its early years the paper was a leftist and polemical publication and defended the interests of the masses. Therefore, it gained popularity among rural people. Its rival was the conservative newspaper Århus Stiftstidende. In the 1890s, Aarhus Amtstidende became more versatile, but it again adopted its polemical style in the 1920s. This polemical stance led to a decrease in its circulation.

Later the paper became affiliated with Venstre party and had a classical liberal political stance. Its long term editor-in-chief was Jakob Peder Martin who held the post from 1928 to its closure in 1965.

Aarhus Amtstidende sold 11,171 copies in 1961. The paper folded on 11 November 1965 when it merged with Grenaa Folketidende.
