= Lars Muhl =

Danish writer, mystic and musician (born 1950)

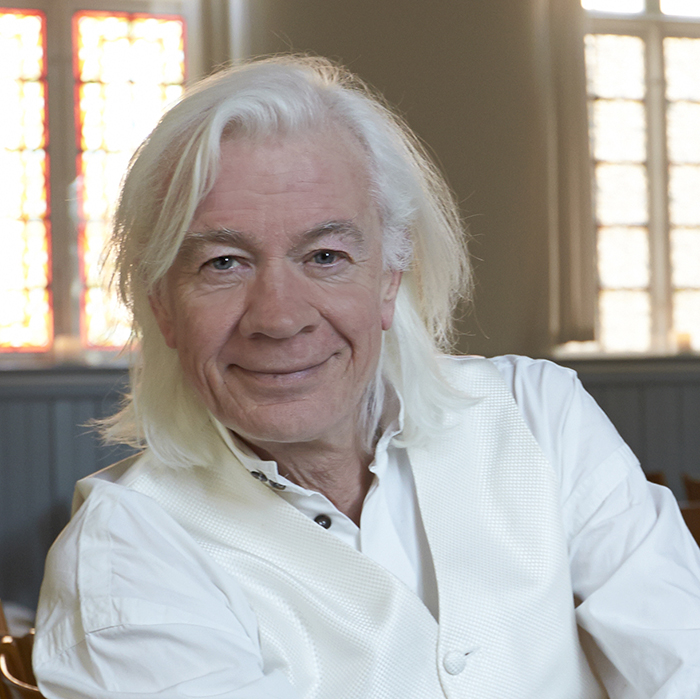
- Born: 14 November 1950 (age 76); Aarhus, Denmark
- Occupations: Author and musician
- Website: larsmuhl.dk

Lars Muhl is a Danish writer, mystic and musician, born in Aarhus, Denmark in 1950.

For many years, Lars Muhl was a successful singer-songwriter in Denmark. Concurrently with his music career, he has engaged with self-studies of comparative religion, esoteric knowledge and philosophy since 1965, and from 1988 he has focused on Aramaic, Christian and Jewish mysticism. He has written several books on these subjects and hosts workshops and lectures in Denmark and abroad.

== Biography ==
Lars Muhl started professional writing in 1965–66, at the age of 14, as a freelance journalist for the former regional newspaper Aarhus Amtstidende. In 1993, he debuted as an author with his memoirs Sjæl i Flammer (lit.: Soul in Flames) and has written numerous books since then. In Sjæl i Flammer, Muhl describes how his childhood was marked by his younger sister's all too early death in 1960 and he claims this as the triggering factor in releasing an unusually sensitive and highly developed form of perceptual ability (ESP), enabling him to feel other people's pain as well as perceive hidden aspects of life.

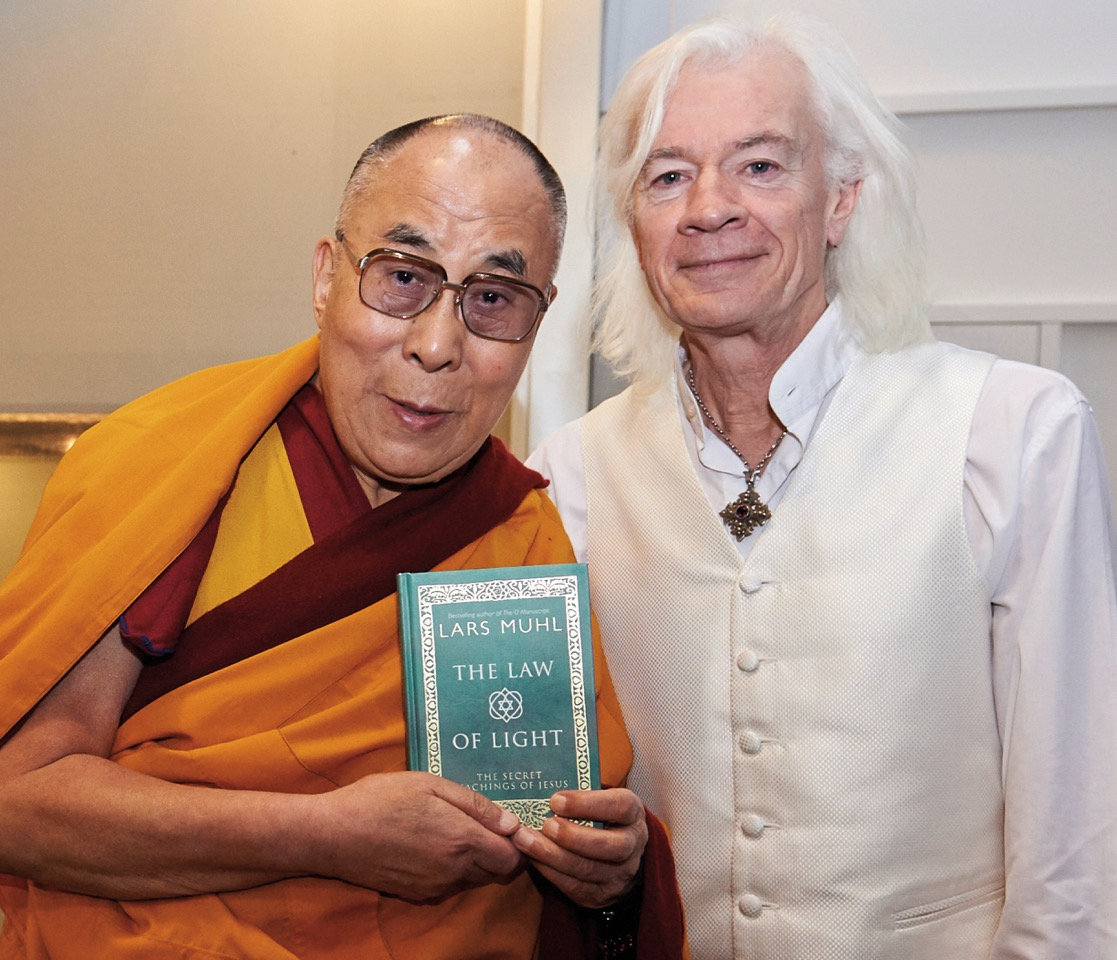
Lars Muhl's meeting with Dalai Lama in 2015

Lars Muhl became an active musician in 1966, when he wrote for and played in the band Dragon Five (1966–68). Since then, he has been in the rock bands Daisy (1968–74) and Warm Guns (1978–84), but has also performed and issued recordings as a solo artist and produced for other musicians. Muhl sings, plays keyboards, piano and guitar and he has composed many songs altogether of which quite a few has been interpreted by other musicians, both in Denmark and abroad. In Denmark, singer-songwriter Lis Sørensen has in particular performed Muhl-songs. In 1975–76, he studied at the Royal Academy of Music in Aarhus.

After falling ill in 1995, Lars Muhl stopped his musical career in 1999, to devote his time to esoteric studies and writing. In The Seer, Muhl describes how he was struck down by an illness that defied diagnosis, and kept him confined to his bed for three years, until, through a close friend, he came into contact with a seer, Calle de Montségur, who got him out of his sick bed and afterwards took him under his wing as a kind of “sorcerer’s apprentice”. This apprenticeship lasted from 1998 until 2003. This meeting resulted in the spiritual trilogy The O Manuscript (The Seer, The Magdalene and The Grail).

Lars Muhl married therapist Githa Ben-David in 2010 but the couple divorced in 2022. Lars has no biological children but has fathered 4 step children.

Lars Muhl entered on Watkins’ list of the 100 Most Spiritually Influential Living People in 2013.

== Discography ==
=== Daisy ===
- The Lonesome Brigade (1975)

  "Forever Beautiful"  (2025)

=== Warm Guns ===
- First Shot Live (1979)
- Instant Schlager (1980)
- Italiano Moderno (1981)
- Follow Your Heart or Fall (1983)
- Hey-Hey-Hey Live Roskilde Festival 83 (1983)
- Hard Luck (compilation) (1990)

=== Solo ===
- The Glorious Art of Breaking Little Girls' Hearts and Blowing Big Boys' Brains (1986)
- King of Croon (1988)
- When Angels Fall (1991)
- Kingdom Come (1994)
- Regnfang (from the musical Regnfang) (1996)
- Mandolina (1997)
- Till the End of Time – Best of Lars Muhl (1999)

=== Lars Muhl & Githa Ben-David ===
- To Heal the Space Between Us (Gilalai, 2011)
- Zeros (Gilalai, 2015)

== Bibliography ==
- Sjæl I Flammer (Hovedland 1993) (2nd edition 2008)
- Zoé (Hovedland 1995)
- Frejas Øje (Hovedland 1996)
- Skyggerejser (Hovedland 1998)
- Hjertets Stilhed – Samsøs Kraft (1999)
- Det Glemte Sprog (2000)
- Den Himmelske Vej (2000)
- Seeren fra Andalusien (Lindhardt og Ringhof 2002)
- Maria Magdalene (Lindhardt og Ringhof 2004)
- GRAL (Lindhardt og Ringhof 2006)
- Det Knuste Hjertes Visdom (Lemuel Books 2007)
- The O Manuscript - The Seer, The Magdalene and The Grail (Lemuel Books 2008)
- Det Aramæiske Mysterium (Lemuel Books 2008)
- Frejas Spådom (Lindhardt og Ringhof 2010)
- The Law of Light - The Aramaic Mystery (Gilalai 2010)
- Gralstrilogien (Lindhardt & Ringhof 2012)
- Terapeuternes Mysterieskole (Gilalai 2012)
- The Seer - Volume 1 of The O Manuscript (Watkins Publishing 2012)
- Taxo Luma – Fortællingen om en Avatar (Lindhardt & Ringhof 2012)
- Lysets Lov: Det Aramæiske Mysterium (Gilalai 2013)
- The O Manuscript - The Seer, The Magdalene and The Grail (reprint edition, Watkins Publishing 2013)
- The Law of Light: The Secret Teachings of Jesus (Watkins Publishing 2014)
- SHM - Lyset i mørket (Gilalai 2015)
- Seeren Special edition of Seeren fra Andalusien (Gilalai 2016)
- The Seer - Volume 1 of The O Manucript (reprint edition, Watkins Publishing 2016)
- The Magdalene - Volume 2 of The O Manucript (Watkins Publishing 2017)
- The Grail - Volume 3 of The O Manuscript (Watkins Publishing 2017)
- Drengen der gav den blinde sine øjne (Turbine 2017)
- Det Knuste Hjertes Visdom - Special edition (Gilalai 2017)
- The Gate of Light: Healing Practices to Connect You to Source Energy (Watkins Publishing 2018)
- Lyset i et menneskes hjerte - Bogen om det uendelige univers indeni (HarperCollins 2018)
- Verdens Frelser - SoulBooks (Gilalai 2019)
- The Wisdom of a Broken Heart (Gilalai 2019)
- Guds-formlen (Gilalai 2020)
- The God Formula (Gilalai 2020)
- Frihedens Øjeblik (Gilalai 2021)
- " The Light Within a Broken Heart" (Watkins Publishing 2022)
- " Skæbnespejlet" (Sacred Seed 2023)
- " The Sacred Numbers of Initiation" (Watkins 2023)
- " Hva' Saa!" (Frydenlund 2024)
- " Det Sande og Det Evige" m. Naleea Landmann (Frydenlund 2025)
- " The True and The Eternal" m. Naleea Landmann (Watkins 2025)

Lars Muhls books are all in Danish, except "The O Manuscript - The Seer, The Magdalene and The Grail", "The Law of Light", "The Gate of Light", "The Wisdom of a Broken Heart" and "The God Formula".

== Filmography ==
- The Seer (Gilalai 2016), the film has also been made in Danish (Seeren), in German (Der Seher) and in French (Le Voyant).
- Yeshua - Lost in Translation (Vision Film 2016)
- The Gate of Light (Gilalai 2016)
- The Note from Heaven - on vocal sound therapist Githa Ben-David (Gilalai 2017)
- … før øjet brister - et møde med fotografiker og sanger Poul Erik Veigaard (Gilalai 2017), a film on Danish photographer and singer Poul Erik Veigaard
- Drømmefangeren - en film om drømmetyder, musiker og forfatter Frank Lorentzen (Gilalai 2019), a film on Danish dream reader, musician and author Frank Lorentzen

== Sources ==
- "Kraks Blå Bog 2014-2015", Gads Forlag, 2014, ISBN 978-87-12-04983-8
- Discogs: Lars Muhl
- Bibliotek.dk: Bibliography (Lars Muhl) (in Danish)
- Lars Muhls own homepage
- Gilalai
- Cosmoporta
