= 50 Minute Technicolor Dream =

Compilation album by Tomorrow
- Released: 1998
- Recorded: Maida Vale Studios, Olympia Grand Hall, 1967
- Genre: Psychedelic rock
- Length: 55:00
- Label: RPM 184

Tomorrow chronology
Tomorrow (1968)	50 Minute Technicolor Dream (1998)

50 Minute Technicolor Dream is a compilation album that consists of mostly previously unreleased recordings by Tomorrow. Tracks 1–2 are unused demos for the film Blowup. Tracks 7–8 are from BBC Radio 1: "Top Gear" (the first "Peel Session", recorded 21 September 1967), recorded at Maida Vale Studios. Tracks 9–16 are live at "Christmas On Earth Continued" Friday, 22 December 1967, recorded at Kensington Olympia Grand & National Halls.

== Reception ==
Professional ratings
Review scores
Source	Rating
AllMusic	3/5 stars

AllMusic writer Richie Unterberger was positive about the album, writing that the album was interesting to listen to, and praised the liner notes.

== Track listing ==
1. "Am I Glad to See You" (Keith Hopkins, Ken Burgess) - 4:29
2. "Blow Up" - 1:53
3. "Caught in a Web" - 3:08
4. "Revolution" (Hopkins, Steve Howe) - 3:48
5. "Why" (David Crosby, Jim McGuinn) - 3:57
6. "Real Life Permanent Dream" (Hopkins) - 3:16
7. "Three Jolly Little Dwarfs" (Hopkins, Burgess) - 2:26
8. "Revolution" (Hopkins, Howe) - 4:11
9. "Caught in a Web" (live) - 3:22
10. "Shotgun & the Duck" (live) - 5:53
11. "My White Bicycle" (live) (Hopkins, Burgess) - 3:07
12. "Real Life Permanent Dream" (live) (Hopkins) - 2:32
13. "Revolution" (live) (Hopkins, Howe) - 3:32
14. "Why" (live) (Crosby, McGuinn) - 3:22
15. "Mr Rainbow" (live) - 2:41
16. "Strawberry Fields Forever" (live) (Lennon/McCartney) - 4:08

== Personnel ==
- Keith West – vocals
- Steve Howe – guitar
- Twink – drums
- Junior – bass guitar
