= Fou =

Fou may refer to:

== People ==
- Fou Fonoti (born 1991), American football player
- Fou Ts'ong (1934–2020), Chinese pianist
- Pama Fou (born 1990), Australian rugby union player

== Other uses ==
- Fou (instrument) (缻), an ancient Chinese percussion instrument
- Fou (album), by French progressive rock band Ange

== See also ==
- Le Fou (disambiguation)
- Folle blanche, a wine grape
- Fougamou Airport, in Gabon
