= My White Bicycle =

Single by Tomorrow

from the album Tomorrow
- B-side: "Claramount Lake"
- Released: May 1967
- Genre: Psychedelic rock
- Length: 3:17
- Label: Parlophone
- Songwriters: Keith Hopkins, Ken Burgess
- Producer: Mark Wirtz

Tomorrow singles chronology
"My White Bicycle" (1967)	"Revolution" (1967)

"My White Bicycle" is a song written by Keith West and Ken Burgess of the English rock band Tomorrow. Released in May 1967, it was the band's debut single.

== Background and recording ==
According to Tomorrow drummer John 'Twink' Alder, the song was inspired by the Dutch Provo movement, a loosely-affiliated anarchist group which instituted a bicycle-sharing system in Amsterdam: "They had white bicycles in Amsterdam and they used to leave them around the town. And if you were going somewhere and you needed to use a bike, you'd just take the bike and you'd go somewhere and just leave it. Whoever needed the bikes would take them and leave them when they were done."

The group recorded "My White Bicycle" in Abbey Road Studio 1, at the same time the Beatles were recording Sgt. Pepper's Lonely Hearts Club Band in Studio 2; John Lennon once entered Studio 1 while Tomorrow were recording. Lennon later wrote in Melody Maker that he considered the song to be a "psychedelic anthem", and the song subsequently became an underground hit.

For the whistle on the track, the band asked a policeman outside the studio to come in and blow his whistle into a microphone, despite the fact that the band members were all smoking illegal drugs during the session.

== Reception ==
The single failed to break the music charts.

Richie Unterberger of AllMusic wrote that the song was one of the first to prominently feature backwards guitar.

== Cover versions ==
- The Scottish rock band Nazareth did a cover version, which reached No. 14 in the UK Singles Chart in 1975.
- Actor Nigel Planer, as his character Neil the Hippy from TV-series The Young Ones, reached No. 97 with his cover in 1984.
- English singer-songwriter Robyn Hitchcock included a cover version on his album 1967: Vacations in the Past, a collection of covers of songs from 1967 (with one original song by Robyn) recorded to accompany his memoir. The album reached No. 62 in 2024.
