= Vu d'un chien =

Studio album by Ange
- Released: 1980
- Recorded: Studio Miraval, 83143 Le Val, Var, France
- Genre: Progressive rock
- Label: Philips
- Producer: Ange, Claude Bibonne

Ange chronology
Guet-Apens (1978)	Vu d'un chien (1980)	Moteur! (1981)

Christian Décamps & Fils chronology
Le Mal d'Adam (1979)	Vu d'un chien (1980)	Juste Une Ligne Bleue (1990)

Vu d'un chien is a studio album by the French progressive rock band Ange. It was released in 1980.

== Track listing ==
Side One:

1. "Les Temps modernes" (Christian Decamps, Francis Decamps) – 05:12
2. "Les Lorgnons" (Christian Decamps, Francis Decamps) – 03:58
3. "Foutez-moi la paix" (Christian Decamps, Francis Decamps) – 02:10
4. "Je travaille sans filet" (Christian Decamps, Francis Decamps) – 07:10

Side Two:

1. "La Suisse" (Christian Decamps, Francis Decamps) – 05:40
2. "Personne au bout du fil" (Christian Decamps, Francis Decamps) – 03:49
3. "Pour un rien" (Christian Decamps, Francis Decamps) – 02:48
4. "Vu d'un chien" (Christian Decamps, Francis Decamps) – 06:13

== Personnel ==
- Lead Vocals, Acoustic Guitar, Keyboards: Christian Decamps
- Keyboards, Backing Vocals: Francis Decamps
- Guitar: Robert Defer
- Bass, Backing Vocals: Didier Viseux
- Drums, Percussion: Jean-Pierre Guichard
