= Technicolor Dream =

Technicolor Dream or some variation thereof may refer to:

- The 14 Hour Technicolor Dream, a 1967 concert in London
- 50 Minute Technicolor Dream, a 1998 album by Tomorrow
- "Technicolor Dreams", a song by Status Quo from the album Picturesque Matchstickable Messages from the Status Quo, 1968
- "Technicolor Dreams", a song by the Bee Gees from the album This Is Where I Came In, 2001
