= Revolution (Tomorrow song) =

Single by Tomorrow

from the album Tomorrow
- A-side: "Revolution"
- B-side: "Three Jolly Little Dwarves"
- Released: August 1967
- Recorded: 1967
- Genre: Psychedelic rock
- Length: 3:48
- Label: Parlophone
- Songwriter(s): Keith Hopkins, Steve Howe
- Producer(s): Mark Wirtz

Tomorrow singles chronology
"My White Bicycle" (1967)	"Revolution" (1967)

"Revolution" is a song by the English psychedelic rock band Tomorrow. It was first released as a single in the UK by Parlophone in September 1967. The song also appeared on the group's self-titled album Tomorrow in February 1968. "Revolution" was written by Keith Alan Hopkins (better known as Keith West) and Steve Howe. It failed to break the music charts.

Several different recordings of the song have been released by Tomorrow. The 1999 CD reissue of Tomorrow also includes a previously unreleased studio demo recording of the song. This version does not have the orchestral overdubs but instead has some phasing effects not heard in the later recording. Both were recorded at EMI's Abbey Road Studios in London in mid 1967. Tomorrow performed this song for John Peel's radio show on the BBC, and there is also a live recording on the album 50 Minute Technicolor Dream.

AllMusic writer Richie Unterberger called "Revolution" an "infectious hippie anthem".
