= Ken Burgess (musician) =

British-Israeli musical artist (1944–2021)

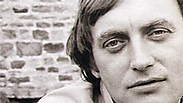
- Ken Burgess, 1978

Background information
- Born: 26 November 1944; Dagenham, Essex, England
- Died: 13 June 2021 (aged 76)
- Occupations: Musician, songwriter, composer, producer, singer, painter.
- Instruments: Guitar, vocals
- Years active: 1960–2021

Ken Burgess (26 November 1944 – June 13, 2021) was a British-Israeli producer, composer, songwriter, singer and painter. He was born and raised in Dagenham, London. Burgess produced and wrote songs for various bands and singers in England, France, America and Israel. His songs reached the top of the charts worldwide. All together, Burgess is registered as the producer and writer of over 500 songs.

== Career ==
Burgess taught himself guitar at the age of 9, and at the age of 14 joined his first rock group, the Teenbeats, which included lead singer Tony Colton and bass player Keith West. The group disbanded a year later.

Burgess continued writing songs together with Keith West. The two wrote songs for Keith's group Tomorrow, including the hit "My White Bicycle". The group recorded in Abbey Road studio 1, at the same time as The Beatles were recording in studio 2, and John Lennon entered the studio while Tomorrow were recording My White Bicycle. Later, Lennon wrote in the British international music magazine Melody Maker that he considered the song to be the "psychedelic anthem" and the song became an underground hit.

Ken Burgess produced, composed and wrote albums and songs for various groups and singers, including:

- Tomorrow – Tomorrow – 1968
- Riff Raff – Original Man – 1972
- Rare Bird – Rare Bird – 1972
- East of Eden – Sin City Girls – 1973
- Clive Westlake – Turn Your Light On Me – 1973
- Arthur Conley – Another Time, I Got You Babe – 1974
- David McWilliams – Livin's Just a State of Mind – 1974
- Zzebra – Zzebra – 1974, Panic – 1975
- Lenny Henry – Sweet Soul Dream, Never the Same as Yesterday – 1976
- Vincent Price – The Monster Mash, The Bard's Own Recipe – 1977
- Ken Burgess – Somewhere to Belong (solo album) – 1979
- Classical Mechanics – featuring Ken Burgess, Tommy Air, Liam Genockey and Alan Marshall – 1979
- Ange – Moteur! – 1981
- Alain Bashung – Pizza – 1981
- Navah Baruchin – Navah – 1982

Burgess also worked in various projects with musicians such as: Tommy Eyre, Jeff Beck, Liam Genockey, Trevor Murrel, John McCoy, Steve Howe, Steve Gregory, Richard Brunton, Steve Bird, Dave Quincy, Loughty Amao, Terry Smith, Garth Watroy, Jeff Allen, Roger Sutton, Gus Yeadon, Dion Estos and The London Symphony Orchestra.

In 1982 Burgess produced a Francis Lai project written for the female Israeli singer Navah Baruchin. Burgess later married Baruchin, and converted to become Jewish. After living together and working in France and England, the couple moved to Israel.

Burgess worked with various singers in Israel such as Danny Litany, Doron Mazar, Raffi Veinstock, Mordechai Ben David, Dudu Fisher, Yishai Lapidot, Amiran Dvir, Yeedle Werdyger, Tor Marquis and produced his own four solo albums:

- I'll Never Walk Alone in the Desert – 2000
- Rebuild His Kingdom – 2001
- Ken Burgess – 2004
- Somewhere to Belong (remake) – 2010

Burgess owned the recording studio "United Studio" in Israel and later on he retired and pursued his other passion of painting. Burgess painted landscapes and biblical events. His paintings are shown in his own exhibitions in Israel.
