= Tomorrow (Tomorrow album) =

Studio album by Tomorrow
- Released: February 1968
- Recorded: Spring 1967
- Genre: Psychedelic rock, psychedelic pop, freakbeat
- Length: 38:31
- Label: Parlophone
- Producer: Mark Wirtz

Tomorrow chronology
Tomorrow (1968)	50 Minute Technicolor Dream (1998)

Alternative covers
- Reissue (Harvest Records)

Tomorrow is the only studio album by the English psychedelic rock band Tomorrow. It was originally released in 1968 by EMI Parlophone in the U.K. in a black and white sleeve. A slightly different version of the album was also released in the U.S. in 1968 by Sire Records, one of the first releases on that label. Although it was not a success when it was first released, it is now widely regarded as one of the best psychedelic rock albums ever made.

== Background and recording ==
Tomorrow guitarist Steve Howe had been doing session work with producer Mark Wirtz, and Wirtz had shown interest in some of Tomorrow's songs, particularly "My White Bicycle". Impressed by the sound Wirtz achieved with their recording of "My White Bicycle", particularly the backwards effect in the beginning, Tomorrow retained him as producer for their album.

Nearly all of the songs on the album were written by Tomorrow singer Keith West and his school friend and songwriting partner Ken Burgess. With few exceptions, West wrote the lyrics by himself and the music was predominantly Burgess's, though West took on a larger role in writing the music as time went on. West's songwriting credits appear under his real name, Keith Hopkins; this was a concession to his family, who in his words "didn't feel it was really me unless they saw it in black and white."

The lyrics to "Three Jolly Little Dwarves" were written by West while experimenting with LSD.

During the album sessions Tomorrow recorded two completely different songs with the same title, "Now Your Time Has Come", only one of which appeared on the album. Wirtz and the band members were both at a loss to explain how the songs came to share a title. The "Now Your Time Has Come" which was excluded from the album appeared as a bonus track on the 1999 CD issue.

== Release ==
There was a long delay between initial recording sessions in spring 1967 and release in February 1968. By the time the album arrived in record stores, the psychedelic trend had already begun to abate. EMI provided a very small recording budget and would not allow prints of a colour album cover to be made, although some later re-issues were printed with a modified colour cover.

In 1976, Harvest Records (another EMI label) re-issued the album as part of its Harvest Heritage series, with catalogue number SHSM-2010. This edition features a new colour cover which states in large letters on the front: "featuring Keith West and Steve Howe". It includes an extra track as the second-to-last on side one, "Claramount Lake" (the B-side of "My White Bicycle").

In 1991, See For Miles Records re-issued the album (cat.# SEE CD 314), adding "Claremont Lake" (as track # 3) for a total of 12 songs, with liner notes by Dinnes Cruickshank.

In 1999, EMI released a CD version (EMI 4988192) with additional tracks by The Aquarian Age (band members Twink and Junior) and singer Keith West, and credited to "Tomorrow Featuring Keith West". "Why" is a cover of a song by The Byrds that originally appeared as the B-side to their single "Eight Miles High".

== Reception ==
Professional ratings
Review scores
Source	Rating
AllMusic	4.5/5 stars

In a retrospective review, AllMusic' Richie Unterberger described Tomorrow as "a solid effort", particularly praising the track "Hallucinations", though he felt the "self-conscious English whimsy" on some of the other tunes did not work. Mark Smotroff of Audiophile Reviews called the album "a knockout lost classic".

== Track listing ==
All songs written by Keith Hopkins and Ken Burgess, except where noted.

Side one

1. "My White Bicycle" – 3:18
2. "Colonel Brown" – 2:53
3. "Real Life Permanent Dream" (Hopkins) – 3:17
4. "Shy Boy" – 2:27
5. "Revolution" (Hopkins, Steve Howe) – 3:51

Side two

6. "The Incredible Journey of Timothy Chase" (Hopkins) – 3:19
7. "Auntie Mary's Dress Shop" – 2:47
8. "Strawberry Fields Forever" (Lennon/McCartney) – 4:00
9. "Three Jolly Little Dwarfs" – 2:28
10. "Now Your Time Has Come" – 4:54
11. "Hallucinations" – 2:43

1999 CD reissue bonus tracks

12. "Claramount Lake" – 3:02 (b-side of "My White Bicycle")
13. "Real Life Permanent Dream" (Hopkins) – 2:24 (studio demo recording)
14. "Why" (Roger McGuinn, David Crosby) – 3:59 (studio demo recording)
15. "Revolution" (Hopkins, Howe) – 3:50 (phased mono version, studio demo recording)
16. "Now Your Time Has Come" – 3:05
17. "10,000 Words In a Cardboard Box" (John Alder, John Wood) – 3:27 (by The Aquarian Age)
18. "Good Wizard Meets Naughty Wizard" (Alder, Wood, Mark Wirtz) – 4:42 (by The Aquarian Age)
19. "Me" (Alder, Wood) – 3:12 (by The Aquarian Age)
20. "On a Saturday" (Hopkins) – 3:13 (by Keith West)
21. "The Kid Was a Killer" (Hopkins) – 2:31 (by Keith West)
22. "She" (Hopkins) – 2:30 (by Keith West)
23. "The Visit" (Hopkins) – 4:05 (by Keith West)

== Personnel ==
Tomorrow

- Keith West – vocals
- Steve Howe – guitar
- Junior – bass
- Twink – drums

Additional musicians

- Mark Wirtz – organ, piano
- Ronnie Wood – bass (on tracks 20–23)
- Aynsley Dunbar – drums (on tracks 20–23)

Production

- Mark P. Wirtz with engineers Geoff Emerick, Peter Bown*
