= Excerpt from A Teenage Opera =

Single by Keith West
- B-side: "Theme From A Teenage Opera" (by The Mark Wirtz Orchestra)
- Released: 28 July 1967
- Recorded: February – April 1967
- Studio: EMI, London
- Genre: Psychedelic pop
- Length: 4:25
- Label: Parlophone
- Songwriters: Keith West; Mark Wirtz
- Producer: Mark Wirtz

Keith West singles chronology
"Excerpt from A Teenage Opera" (1967)	"Sam" (1967)

Performance on Beat-Club
- "Excerpt from A Teenage Opera" on YouTube

"Excerpt from A Teenage Opera" (also known as "Grocer Jack") is a 1967 single by Keith West, produced by Mark Wirtz. It was a big hit in Europe, peaking at number 2 on the UK Singles Chart. The single was part of a bigger A Teenage Opera project. The song was written by Wirtz and West, credited as "Philwit / Hopkins".

== History ==
According to Mark Wirtz, the song comes from a dream he had about an ageing door-to-door grocer named Jack in a small, turn-of-the-20th-century village, who was mocked by the children as he was taken for granted by the town folk. When Jack unexpectedly died, the town folk reacted with anger about the inconvenience of now having to be self-reliant about their staple provisions, while the children were heartbroken, in truth having loved and appreciated Jack all the while.

Working with EMI recording engineer Geoff Emerick at EMI Studios (later Abbey Road Studios) on a project called Mood Mosaic, Wirtz developed the idea which he called "Excerpt from 'A Teenage Opera'" because, he said: "That way, if the single is a hit, people will want an entire LP of the whole opera". The recording used the voices of children from the Corona Academy, with Keith West of the band Tomorrow, with whom Wirtz was also working, as lead vocalist, and his bandmate Steve Howe on guitar. Wirtz presented the song to Emerick in February 1967, and the pair worked on the track up until Wirtz presented it for EMI's chairmen in April 1967. The single was recorded at EMI with Emerick, Peter Bown, Peter Vince, and Malcolm Addey all acting as engineers.

== Release and legacy ==
At first, EMI executives were critical of the use of children's voices on a supposedly "rock" record, but Wirtz played an acetate of the record to Radio London DJ John Peel, who loved it and played it on his show. After its eventual release, it climbed the UK singles chart, reaching number 2 in September 1967 (behind "The Last Waltz" by Engelbert Humperdinck). The single was a major hit in Europe, but in the US only reached number 109 on Billboard's Bubbling Under Hot 100 chart in October 1967.

According to Wirtz, EMI treated the single as a one-off novelty, and refused to give the go-ahead for a full album until there had been a second hit single. Wirtz turned down an offer from Robert Stigwood to help develop the project. He continued to work on the project, which he intended to be "a kaleidoscope of stories, a bouquet of allegorical, tragicomic tales about a variety of characters and their fate, all related to each other by the common thread of living in the same imaginary turn-of the-century village. Each character distinguished him/herself by rebelliously pursuing a dream or lifestyle against all odds and in defiance of conformity, their ageless celebration of youth and individuality embodying the very spirit of Rock’n’Roll." However, Wirtz became involved in a contractual dispute with EMI, and the ending of the offshore radio stations around the UK with the introduction of Radio 1 led to changes in the company's marketing approach. The second single from the proposed Teenage Opera, "Sam", was only a modest hit, and Wirtz and West lost interest in the project and ended their working partnership.

In 2000, Wirtz wrote: "Quintessentially, what killed Teenage Opera was EMI's blind and stubborn procrastination and political tomfoolery, which ultimately shot us all to shit. Nevertheless, even in its incomplete form and ultimate failure, Teenage Opera entered the history books as a bright torch and shining star, having set a precedent and broken down barriers to pave the way for others to succeed where I had failed."

== Personnel ==
- Keith West — vocals
- Corona Academy children's choir — children vocals
- The Ivy League — backing vocals
- The Ladybirds — backing vocals
- Peter Lee Stirling — backing vocals
- Steve Howe — guitar
- Jim Sullivan — guitar
- Vic Flick — guitar
- Russ Stableford — bass
- Clem Cattini — drums
- Mark Wirtz Orchestra — orchestra

== Cultural references ==
The song was namechecked on Half Man Half Biscuit's song 'Our Tune' from the album McIntyre, Treadmore and Davitt (1991), the last lines of which are "Grocer Jack! Grocer Jack! Get off your back! Go into town!" from the chorus, except bellowed rather than sung.

== Chart performance ==
=== Weekly charts ===
Chart (1967–1968)	Peak position
Austria (Disc Parade)	11
Australia (Kent Music Report)	49
Belgium (Ultratop 50 Flanders)	2
Denmark (DR Top 20)	4
Ireland (RTÉ)	3
Malaysia (Radio Malaysia)	3
Netherlands (Dutch Top 40)	1
Netherlands (Single Top 100)	1
New Zealand (Listener)	10
Poland (Scout Radio)	4
Sweden (Kvällstoppen)	5
Sweden (Tio i Topp)	1
UK (Disc and Music Echo)	24
UK (Melody Maker)	2
UK (New Musical Express)	2
UK (Record Retailer)	2
US Billboard Bubbling Under Hot 100	109
US Record World Singles Coming Up	134
West Germany (Media Control)	2

=== Year-end charts ===
Chart (1967)	Peak position
Belgium (Ultratop 50 Flanders)	36
Netherlands (Dutch Top 40)	30
UK (Record Retailer)	18
