= Le Tour de la Question =

Le Tour de la Question or Le Tour De La Question may refer to:

- Le Tour de la Question (MC Solaar album), 1998
- Le Tour de la question (Ange album), 2007
