= Sève Qui Peut =

Studio album by Ange
- Released: 1989
- Recorded: Studio-Est, Pontarlier
- Genre: Progressive rock
- Label: Mélodie
- Producer: Francis Decamps, Christian Decamps

Ange chronology
Tout Feu Tout Flamme... C'est Pour De Rire (1987)	Sève Qui Peut (1989)	Vagabondages (1989)

Christian Décamps & Fils chronology
Le Mal D'Adam (1979)	Sève Qui Peut (1989)	Juste Une Ligne Bleue (1990)

Sève Qui Peut is a concept album by the French progressive rock band Ange about the French revolution, it was also a play and a ballet. It was released in 1989.

== Track listing ==
Side One:

1. "Aimer / Haïr" (Christian Decamps, Francis Decamps) – 07:55
2. "Vivre Avec Le Cœur" (Christian Decamps, Francis Decamps) – 04:58
3. "Les Plaisirs Faciles" (Christian Decamps, Francis Decamps) – 04:16
4. "L'or, L'argent Et La Lumière" (Christian Decamps, Francis Decamps) – 07:12

Side Two:

1. "Briser La Glace" (Christian Decamps, Francis Decamps) – 05:32
2. "Les Amours-Lumières" (Christian Decamps, Francis Decamps) – 04:28
3. "Non !!" (Christian Decamps, Francis Decamps) – 03:56
4. "Grands Sentiments" (Christian Decamps, Francis Decamps) – 04:20
5. "Sève Qui Peut" (Christian Decamps, Francis Decamps) – 08:06

== Personnel ==
- Lead Vocals, Acoustic Guitar, Keyboards: Christian Decamps
- Keyboards, Backing Vocals: Francis Decamps
- Guitar, Backing Vocals: Jean-Michel Brezovar
- Guitar: Robert Defer
- Bass: Daniel Haas
- Drums, Percussion: Jean-Pierre Guichard

=== Additional Musicians ===
- Vocals [Quercus Robur]: Bruno Nion
