= A Teenage Opera =

Soundtrack album by Mark Wirtz and Tomorrow
- Released: 1996
- Recorded: 1967
- Genre: Musical
- Label: EMI
- Producer: Mark Wirtz

A Teenage Opera is a musical project from the 1960s, created by record producer Mark Wirtz. The first song released from the project was "Excerpt from A Teenage Opera" ("Grocer Jack") recorded by Keith West in 1967. The album was not released until 1996, and a stage show was performed in 2017.

== History ==
According to Wirtz, he had been working on an idea for a rock opera since January 1966, when he was experimenting in his London studio and produced a piece of music entitled "A Touch of Velvet – A Sting of Brass", under the name of "Mood Mosaic". He was asked to join EMI as an in-house record producer and he accepted, starting in January 1967. He had already seen Pink Floyd start their career and he personally recommended them to be signed but thought the task of producing them would be better left to fellow producer Norman Smith. Wirtz decided to work with another band he had enjoyed, The In Crowd, who soon changed their name to Tomorrow. According to Wirtz, he dreamed up the idea of Grocer Jack soon after being contracted to EMI and in February 1967 shared the idea with his engineer Geoff Emerick, who agreed to work on it.

They decided to call it Excerpt from A Teenage Opera, to imply there was more to come and the recording was produced as part of the Mood Mosaic project. The title was inspired by producer Kim Fowley, who had a tendency to add an adjective "teenage" to a noun. The basic concept of A Teenage Opera was a series of sketches featuring different characters who lived in a fantasy village. These stories were to be told by a young man to a young girl. Wirtz intended the final project to be animated and later compared it to the Yellow Submarine by the Beatles. Wirtz used members of Tomorrow to produce the first recording. The first song, "Excerpt from A Teenage Opera" (Grocer Jack) was recorded by Keith West, and was played to EMI's product manager, Roy Featherstone, who reacted with bafflement. Nevertheless, when the song was released, it became a hit. The project was intended to be a two-record set to be released later, however, further test releases failed to chart, and EMI then shelved the project.

In 1996, a 23-track album featuring performances by Keith West, Tomorrow, Wirtz, Kippington Lodge, the Sweetshop, Zion de Gallier, and Steve Flynn was released.

== Production ==
The first song written was the story of Grocer Jack, the local grocer who was taken for granted until he died. Wirtz took an unused backing track from an old recording of his, a song called "Love Will Always Find A Way" and Steve Howe was asked to overdub the guitar. Wirtz had the character of Jack in his imagination but asked Keith West to write the lyrics for it. After West heard the music, he wrote the lyrics straightaway. Soon after, the single was recorded at Abbey Road Studios. The engineer, Geoff Emerick, who was working with the Beatles' Sgt. Pepper's Lonely Hearts Club Band album at the time, recorded the song in true stereo, a rarity at the time, with all the latest technology that was available. Wirtz and Emerick layered brass and strings onto the track and added a Clavioline motif for the introduction. The song itself featured the "Opera" trademark, the children's chorus, with singers from Corona Stage School.

=== Single releases ===
"Grocer Jack (Excerpt from A Teenage Opera)" was released on 28 July 1967 and was an instant hit. It was played continuously throughout the summer, later known as the Summer of Love and was helped into its number 2 spot by being played on pirate radio stations, particularly Radio London and Radio Caroline. It was also featured on the very first broadcast of Radio 1 on 30 September 1967. It was only kept off the number 1 spot by Engelbert Humperdinck's The Last Waltz and the enormous success of Grocer Jack got the media's attention. Rumours began circulating about the rest of the project; according to one source, the entire project had been completed by September and there was talk of a musical starring Cliff Richard. Another single, "Sam", again featuring West on vocals and Howe on guitar, was released in October. Despite Radio 1 DJ Tony Blackburn helping to promote it and Wirtz creating a special edit for airplay, "Sam" had less publicity than "Grocer Jack", and (with many of the pirate stations having then been shut down) received less airplay. "Sam" reached number 38 in the chart. Following this, West made the decision to leave the project; he found it difficult to work on two very different projects, and believed that it confused fans. Wirtz meanwhile completed "(He's Our Dear Old) Weatherman" (which had started out as "The Paranoiac Woodcutter"); this was the most complex recording so far, containing more than 100 different sounds. Like "Sam", it received very little airplay. Wirtz had already begun working on Tomorrow's album and recorded a remake of "Hallucinations" for single release. It was renamed to "Mr Rainbow". Wirtz produced this song, sung by Steve Flynn in August 1967. Another track from the album, "Shy Boy", was re-recorded by Kippington Lodge. These two songs were included on the album finally released in 1996.

Uncut asserted in April 2004 that "Sam" was a major influence on Pete Townshend's Tommy.

=== Other recordings ===
Wirtz composed a range of material around this time, releasing it under a series of pseudonyms. Much of the music produced in late 1967 became part of the project and was released on the 1996 album. There were two particular recordings that did not survive, "The Sad Story Of Simon And His Bugle" and "Two's Company, Three Thousand's A Crowd". The latter was a musical comedy, with the voices of Tim Rice and Samantha Jones. In January 1968 Wirtz married Ross Hannaman and subsequently recorded many songs co-written with her. The track "Barefoot and Tiptoe" was one of their collaborations and featured her voice, as well as the Band of the Irish Guards. It was released as by The Sweetshop but sales were poor. Wirtz was forced to shelve the project and concentrated on Tomorrow, whose album was released in February 1968. However, many songs were released over the years that were intended for the project, for example Dream Dream Dream, performed by Wirtz but credited as Zion De Gallier. An album released in Germany in 1968 contained what was the basis for the Theme from a Teenage Opera.

Grocer Jack was parodied in the mid-1970s on a flexi-disk (Private Eye recordings) released by the satirical magazine Private Eye. The words were changed to "Grocer Heath, Grocer Heath, cover up those awful teeth", referring to the prime minister, Edward Heath.

The song was also namechecked on Half Man Half Biscuit's song 'Our Tune' from the album 'McIntyre, Treadmore and Davitt' (1991), the last lines of which are "Grocer Jack! Grocer Jack! Get off your back! Go into town!" from the chorus, except bellowed rather than sung.

== Tracks ==
In 1996, Wirtz released a CD with every track recorded over the years intended for use in A Teenage Opera. Some of the songs (notably the two singles) were remixed in stereo.

The tracks are as follows:

1. Theme From A Teenage Opera (stereo, and little longer than the original single)
2. Festival Of Kings (stereo)
3. Grocer Jack (Excerpt from a Teenage Opera) (stereo)
4. The Paranoiac Woodcutter #1
5. Mr Rainbow
6. Glory's Theme (All Aboard!)
7. On A Saturday
8. Possum's Dance
9. Auntie Mary's Dress Shop (stereo)
10. Love & Occasional Rain (stereo)
11. Grocer Jack (Reprise)
12. Sam (stereo)
13. Farewell to A Broken Doll (stereo)
14. (He's Our Dear Old) Weatherman
15. Shy Boy
16. Grocer Jack's Dream
17. Barefoot & Tiptoe
18. Knickerbocker Glory
19. Dream Dream Dream
20. Colonel Brown (stereo)
21. Cellophane Mary Jane
22. Paranoic Woodcutter #2
23. Theme From A Teenage Opera (end titles) (stereo)

== Stage Show ==
In July 2017, it was announced that a stage show for 'A Teenage Opera' has been written, with script and additional lyrics by Pete Gallagher and featuring the songs of Wirtz and West, produced by Youth Music Theatre UK. Its world premiere would have been held at South Hill Park arts centre in Bracknell on 11 August, with the hope of transferring the production to London.

== See also ==
- Mark Wirtz
- Keith West
- Ross Hannaman
