= Le Cimetière des arlequins =

Studio album by Ange
- Released: 1973
- Studio: Studio Des Dames, Studio Hérouville
- Genre: Progressive rock
- Length: 35:33
- Label: Philips

Ange chronology
Caricatures (1972)	Le Cimetière des arlequins (1973)	Au-delà du délire (1974)

Professional ratings
Review scores
Source	Rating
Allmusic	3/5 stars

Le Cimetière des arlequins is the second album by the French progressive rock band Ange, released in 1973.

== Track listing ==
1. "Ces gens-là" (Jacques Brel) – 4:45
2. "Aujourd'hui c'est la fête chez l'apprenti-sorcier" (J.M. Brézovar/C. Décamps) – 3:30
3. "Bivouac (1ère partie)" (C. Décamps/F. Décamps) – 5:27
4. "L'Espionne lesbienne" (C. Décamps/D. Haas) – 2:50
5. "Bivouac (final)" (C. Décamps/F. Décamps) – 3:00
6. "De temps en temps" (C. Décamps/F. Décamps) – 4:04
7. "La Route aux cyprès" (C. Décamps/D. Haas) – 3:20
8. "Le Cimetière des arlequins" (C. Décamps/G. Jelsch) – 8:47

== Personnel ==
- Jean Michel Brezovar – Guitars, Flute, Vocals
- Christian Décamps – Piano, Keyboards, Hammond organ, Vocals
- Francis Decamps – Keyboards, Mellotron, Vocals
- Daniel Haas – Bass and Acoustic guitar
- Gerald Jelsch – Drums, Percussion

== Release history ==
Date	Format	Label	Catalog
1973	LP	Philips	9101022
1974	LP	Philips	6325037
1990	CD	Philips	842238
1998	CD	Universal/Polygram	

== Certifications ==
Region	Certification	Certified units/sales
France (SNEP)	Gold	100,000^{*}
^{*} Sales figures based on certification alone.
