= Love Changes Everything =

Love Changes Everything may refer to:

- "Love Changes Everything" (song), a song from the musical Aspects of Love, originally sung by Michael Ball
- Love Changes Everything (Sarah Brightman album), 2005
- "Love Changes (Everything)", a 1987 single from Climie Fisher, later covered by Musikk
- Love Changes Everything (Aaron Lines album), 2001, and its title song
- "Love Changes Everything", a single by Honeymoon Suite from their 1988 album Racing After Midnight
