= La Gare de Troyes (album) =

Studio album by Ange
- Released: 1983
- Recorded: Studio Jean Jaures, Paris 19ème, Studio Miraval, 83143 Le Val, Var, France
- Genre: Progressive rock
- Label: Philips
- Producer: Dominique Mouton

Ange chronology
| À propos de... (1978) | La Gare de Troyes (1983) | Fou (1983) |

Christian Décamps & Fils chronology
| Le Mal D'Adam (1979) | La Gare de Troyes (1980) | Juste Une Ligne Bleue (1990) |

La Gare de Troyes is a concept album by the French progressive rock band Ange; it was also a play and a ballet. It was released in 1983.

== Track listing ==
Side One:

1. "La Gare De Troyes" (Christian Decamps, Francis Decamps) – 03:41
2. "A Saute-Mouton" (Christian Decamps, Francis Decamps) – 04:21
3. "Questions D'générations" (Christian Decamps, Francis Decamps) – 04:13
4. "Va-T'en" (Christian Decamps, Francis Decamps) – 04:24
5. "Les Moments Bizarres" (Christian Decamps, Francis Decamps) – 04:31

Side Two:

1. "Shéhérazade" (Christian Decamps, Francis Decamps) – 04:14
2. "Les Jardins" (Christian Decamps, Francis Decamps) – 03:51
3. "Neuf Heures" (Christian Decamps, Francis Decamps) – 04:33
4. "Tout Bleu !" (Christian Decamps, Francis Decamps) – 09:18

== Personnel ==
- Lead Vocals, Pianos: Christian Decamps
- Keyboards, Backing Vocals: Francis Decamps
- Guitar: Serge Cuenot
- Bass: Laurent Sigrist
- Drums, Percussion: Jean-Claude Potin

=== Additional Musicians ===
- Vocals: Guy Boley
- Vocals: Tristan Gros
- Saxophone: Marc Fontana
- Emulator, PPG, Programmation: Guy Battarel
- Backing Vocals: Anne
- Backing Vocals: Maria
