= Uschi Nerke =

German actress and media personality (born 1944)

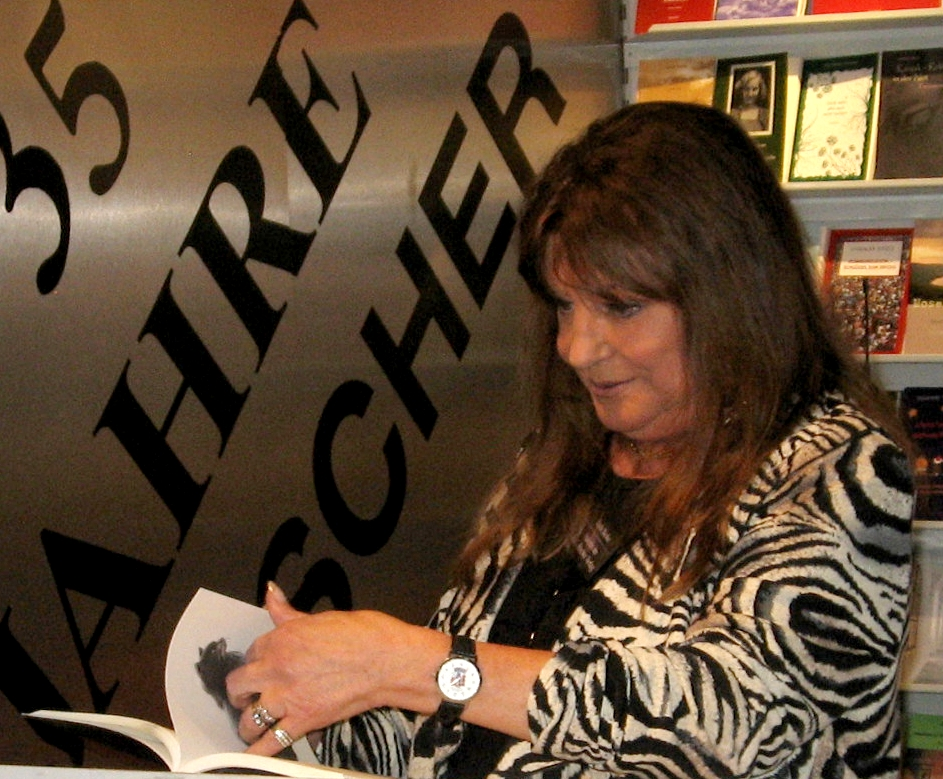
- Nerke In 2012
- Born: Ursula Nerke-Petersen; January 14, 1944 (age 82); Komotau, Sudetenland, Germany
- Years active: 1962-1978, 2011-2013
- Television: Beat-Club, Musikladen
- Spouse: Günther Petersen (m. 1988)
- Children: 1

Ursula Nerke-Petersen (born 14 January 1944) is a German actress and television presenter. She became well known as host of the monthly music television show Beat-Club that ran from 1965 to 1972 and as host of its successor Musikladen until 1978.

== Biography ==
Uschi Nerke was born in Komotau, now Chomutov, Czech Republic.

Nerke's family was expelled from Sudetenland in 1946. After attending school in Hamburg and, from 1957, in Bremen, Nerke apprenticed as a draftswoman from 1962 to 1965 at the Baugewerkschule, which later became the Hochschule Bremen, while simultaneously studying architecture. From 1968 to 1978, after graduating as an engineer, she ran her own architectural practice.

In the early 1960s, Nerke appeared as a singer, was discovered by Hans Hee and released a single under the name Karina on Teldec with the hit songs "Ein kleiner Traum" and "Hier ist mein Platz". Rudi Carrell then recommended her as a presenter.

From 1965 to 1972 and again from 1980 to 1981, she hosted the Beat-Club on Radio Bremen television with changing partners. One of Nerke's swear words in 1966 or 1967 during a live broadcast earned him a warning from her boss, Mike Leckebusch.

In the follow-up program Musikladen, she was on camera with Manfred Sexauer from 1972 to 1979. For this, she received the Bravo Otto Gold Award in the "TV presenter" category in 1975 and the Bravo Otto Bronze Award in the "TV star" category in 1976.

In 2011, Nerke-Petersen recorded two songs, "At Your Side" and "Wishing Me Away", composed by Norbert Görder and produced by Taff Staff Music of Herford.

Until January 12, 2013, she presented her own radio program Beat-Club on Radio Bremen Eins every Saturday from 1 to 3 p.m. She appeared as a presenter at many events during that time.

== Personal life ==
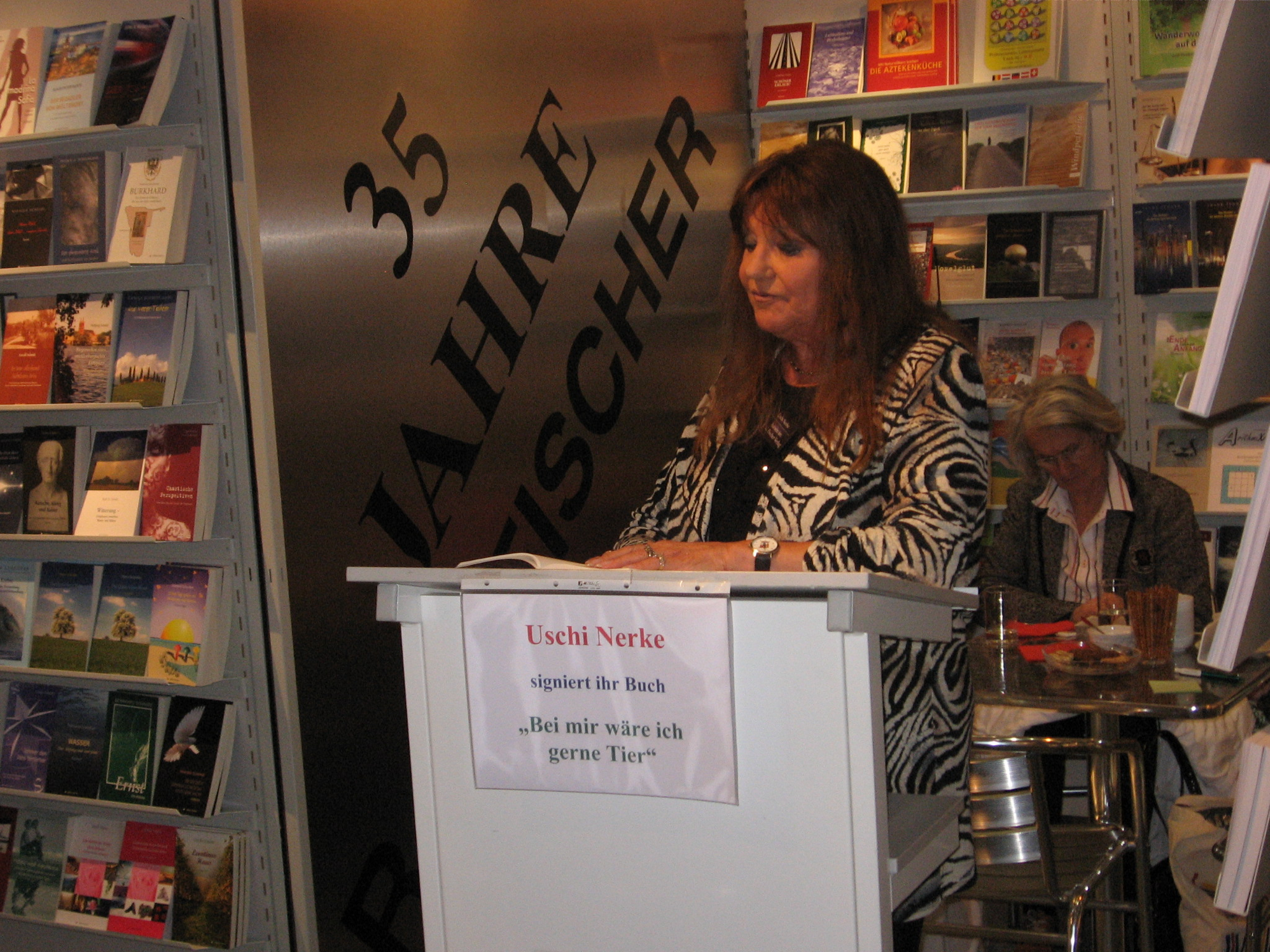
Nerke, pictured in 2012.

Nerke has a son (born in 1978) from her first marriage in 1978. She has been married to textile merchant Günther Petersen since 1988 and lives in Seevetal, near Hamburg.

== Filmography ==
Title	Year	Role	Notes
Beat-Club	1965–1972	Host	Television series
Die Montagsmaler	1975	Herself	Television series
Musikladen	1972–1978	Co-host	Television series
Stayin' Alive – 50 Jahre Bee Gees	2013	Herself	Documentary
