= Émile Jacotey =

Emile Jacotey

Studio album by Ange
- Released: 1975
- Recorded: at Studios des Dames, Paris
- Genre: Progressive rock
- Length: 43:21
- Label: Philips
- Producer: Ange, Philips, J.C. Pognant

Ange chronology
Au-delà du délire (1974)	Emile Jacotey (1975)	Par les fils de Mandrin (1976)

Professional ratings
Review scores
Source	Rating
Allmusic	3/5 stars

Emile Jacotey is the fourth album by the French progressive rock band Ange, released in 1975.

== Track listing ==
1. "Bêle, bêle petite chèvre" (C. Décamps/D. Haas) – 3:50
2. "Sur la trace des fées" (C. Décamps/J.M. Brézovar) – 4:48
3. "Le Nain de Stanislas" (C. Décamps/F. Décamps) – 5:45
4. "Jour après jour" (C. Décamps/D. Haas) – 3:09
5. "Ode à Emile" (C. Décamps/J.M. Brézovar) – 3:03
6. "Ego et Deus" - 17:40
  - "Ego et Deus" (C. Décamps/F. Décamps) – 4:07
  - "J'irai dormir plus loin que ton sommeil" (C. Décamps/D. Haas) – 4:11
  - "Aurélia" (C. Décamps/J.M. Brézovar) – 2:54
  - "Les Noces" (C. Décamps/G. Biger) – 6:28
7. "Le Marchand de planètes" (C. Décamps/G. Biger) – 4:17

== Personnel ==
- Guenole Biger – percussion, drums, electric guitar on "Jour après jour", marimba on "Bêle, bêle petite chèvre", vibraphone on "Ode à Emile"
- Jean Michel Brezovar – electric guitar, vocals
- Christian Décamps – percussions, keyboards, vocals
- Francis Decamps – organ, synthesizer, piano, vocals
- Daniel Haas – acoustic guitar, bass, guitar

== Release history ==
Date	Format	Label	Catalog
1975	LP	Philips	9101 012
1998	CD	Philips	842 240–2

== Certifications ==
Region	Certification	Certified units/sales
France (SNEP)	Gold	100,000^{*}
^{*} Sales figures based on certification alone.
