= Caricatures (Ange album) =

Studio album by Ange
- Released: 1972
- Studios: Studio Davout, Editions Chappell
- Genre: Progressive rock
- Length: 40:23
- Labels: Philips, Éditions Chappell
- Producers: Philips, Claude Bibonne

Ange chronology
Caricatures (1972)	Le Cimetière des arlequins (1973)

Caricatures is the first album by the French progressive rock band Ange, released in 1972.

== Track listing ==
Tracks listings are:

1. "Biafra 80 (Introduction)" (F. Décamps) – 3:50
2. "Tels quels" (C. & F. Décamps/C. Décamps) – 6:55
3. "Dignité" (F. Décamps/R.Lombardo) – 9:35
4. "Le Soir du diable" (J.M. Brézovar/C. Décamps) – 4:32
5. "Caricatures" (F. Décamps/C. Décamps) – 12:46
6. "Biafra 80 (Final)" (F. Décamps) – 2:22

== Personnel ==
Musicians:

- Christian Décamps – Hammond organ, piano, lead vocals
- Jean Michel Brezovar – rhythm, lead and acoustic guitars, flute, vocals
- Francis Décamps – keyboards, vocals
- Daniel Haas – bass, additional guitars
- Gerald Jelsch – drums

== Release history ==
Date	Format	Label	Catalog
1972	LP	Philips	6332 066
1973	LP, Reissue	Philips	6325 181
1998	CD, Reissue	Concord	FGBG 4201.AR
