= Tout Feu Tout Flamme... C'est Pour De Rire =

Studio album by Ange
- Released: 1987
- Recorded: Studio Marianne, February - June 1987
- Genre: Progressive rock
- Length: 41:16
- Label: Mélodie
- Producer: Francis Decamps, Christian Decamps

Ange chronology
Egna (1986)	Tout Feu Tout Flamme... C'est Pour De Rire (1987)	Sève Qui Peut (1989)

Christian Décamps & Fils chronology
Le Mal D'Adam (1979)	Tout Feu Tout Flamme... C'est Pour De Rire (1987)	Juste Une Ligne Bleue (1990)

Tout Feu Tout Flamme... C'est Pour De Rire is a studio album by the French progressive rock band Ange. It was released in 1987.

== Track listing ==
Side One:

1. "Tout Feu, Tout Flamme [Version 87]" (Christian Decamps, Francis Decamps) – 04:35
2. "Tout Contre Tout" (Christian Decamps, Francis Decamps) – 05:24
3. "Coquille D'œuf" (Christian Decamps, Francis Decamps) – 03:35
4. "C'est Pour De Rire" (Christian Decamps, Francis Decamps) – 07:22

Side Two:

1. "Sur Les Grands Espaces Bleus" (Christian Decamps, Francis Decamps) – 06:46
2. "3 X 1 = Nous" (Christian Decamps, Francis Decamps) – 03:37
3. "J'suis Pas D'ici" (Christian Decamps, Francis Decamps) – 02:17
4. "Il Est Le Soleil" (Christian Decamps, Francis Decamps) – 07:40

== Personnel ==
- Lead Vocals: Christian Decamps
- Keyboards, Backing Vocals: Francis Decamps
- Guitar except on "Tout Feu, Tout Flamme": Serge Cuenot
- Bass except on "Tout Feu, Tout Flamme": Laurent Sigrist
- Drums, Percussion, Backing Vocals: Francis Meyer

=== Additional Musicians ===
- Guitar on "Tout Feu, Tout Flamme": Jean-Michel Brezovar
- Bass on "Tout Feu, Tout Flamme": Daniel Haas
- Backing Vocals: Martine Kesselburg
- Backing Vocals: Eva Santi
