= Tome VI (Ange album) =

Live album by Ange
- Released: 1977
- Label: Philips
- Producer: Claude Bibonne

Ange chronology
Par les fils de Mandrin (1976)	Tome VI (1977)	En concert : Live 1970-1971 (1977)

Tome VI, released in 1977, is the first live album by the French progressive rock band Ange.

== Track listing ==
(lengths taken from the CD release)

Side One:

1. "Fils De Lumière" (Christian Decamps, Francis Decamps) – 04:33
2. "Les Longues Nuits D'Isaac" (Christian Decamps, Francis Decamps) – 04:27
3. "Ballade Pour Une Orgie" (Christian Decamps, Jean-Michel Brezovar) – 04:38
4. "Ode À Émile" (Christian Decamps, Jean-Michel Brezovar) – 03:45

Side Two:

1. "Dignité" (R. Lombardo, Francis Decamps) – 15:51

Side Three:

1. "Le Chien, La Poubelle Et La Rose" (Christian Decamps, Francis Decamps) – 13:12
2. "Sur La Trace Des Fées" (Christian Decamps, Jean-Michel Brezovar) – 05:11

Side Four:

1. "Hymne À La Vie" (Christian Decamps, Jean-Michel Brezovar) (tot. 13:45)
  1. "Cantique" (Christian Decamps, Jean-Michel Brezovar) – 05:23
  2. "Procession" (Christian Decamps, Jean-Michel Brezovar) – 05:22
  3. "Hymne" (Christian Decamps, Jean-Michel Brezovar) – 03:00
2. "Ces Gens-Là" (Jacques Brel) – 06:02

== CD Track listing ==
1. "Fils De Lumière" (Christian Decamps, Francis Decamps) – 04:33
2. "Les Longues Nuits D'Isaac" (Christian Decamps, Francis Decamps) – 04:27
3. "Ballade Pour Une Orgie" (Christian Decamps, Jean-Michel Brezovar) – 04:38
4. "Ode À Émile" (Christian Decamps, Jean-Michel Brezovar) – 03:45
5. "Dignité" (R. Lombardo, Francis Decamps) – 15:51
6. "Le Chien, La Poubelle Et La Rose" (Christian Decamps, Francis Decamps) – 13:12
7. "Sur La Trace Des Fées" (Christian Decamps, Jean-Michel Brezovar) – 05:11
8. "Hymne À La Vie 1: Cantique" (Christian Decamps, Jean-Michel Brezovar) – 05:23
9. "Hymne À La Vie 2: Procession" (Christian Decamps, Jean-Michel Brezovar) – 05:22
10. "Hymne À La Vie 3: Hymne" (Christian Decamps, Jean-Michel Brezovar) – 03:00
11. "Ces Gens-Là" (Jacques Brel) – 06:02

== Personnel ==
- Christian Decamps – vocals, piano, percussion, accordion
- Jean Michel Brezovar – electric guitar, acoustic guitar, vocals
- Francis Decamps – organ, A.R.P. synthesizer, mellotron, vocals
- Daniel Haas – bass, acoustic guitar
- Jean Pierre Guichard – drums, percussion, harmonica, vocals
