= En concert 1970–1971 =

Live album by Ange
- Released: 1977
- Recorded: Belfort Janvier 1971, Mars 1971
- Genre: Progressive rock
- Label: RCA
- Producer: Jean-Claude Pognant

Ange chronology
Tome VI : Live 1977 (1977)	En concert 1970–1971 (1977)	Guet-Apens (1979)

En concert 1970–1971 is a live album by the French progressive rock band Ange. It was released by their ex-manager in 1978 against the will of the band.

== Track listing ==
Side One:

1. "Zup" (Francis Decamps) – 02:56
2. "Atome" (Christian Decamps, Francis Decamps) – 17:06

Side Two:

1. "Opus 69" (Francis Decamps) – 03:03
2. "Présentation" (Christian Decamps, Francis Decamps) – 00:36
3. "Général Machin" (Christian Decamps, Francis Decamps) – 03:12
4. "Assis Sur L'univers" (Christian Decamps, Francis Decamps) – 08:20

Side Three:

1. "Professeur Flouze" (Christian Decamps, Francis Decamps) – 04:22
2. "Messaline" (Christian Decamps, Francis Decamps) – 03:14
3. "Cauchemar" (Christian Decamps) – 06:46

Side Four:

1. "Prophétie" (Christian Decamps, Francis Decamps) – 22:34

== Personnel ==
- Lead Vocals, Hammond Organ: Christian Decamps
- Viscount Organ: Francis Decamps
- Guitar, Backing Vocals: Jean-Michel Brezovar
- Drums, Percussion: Gerard Jelsh

=== Additional musicians ===
- Rhythm Guitar on "Présentation", "Général Machin", "Assis Sur L'univers", "Professeur Flouze", "Messaline", "Cauchemar": Jean-Claude Rio
- Bass, Flute on "Présentation", "Général Machin", "Assis Sur L'univers", "Professeur Flouze", "Messaline", "Cauchemar": Patrick Kachanian
- Flute on "Zup", "Atome", "Opus 69", "Prophétie": Jean-Michel Brezovar
- Bass on "Zup", "Atome", "Opus 69", "Prophétie": Daniel Haas
