= La Voiture À Eau =

Studio album by Ange
- Released: 1999
- Recorded: Audiosoft, Ensisheim, 8–23 May 1999
- Genre: Progressive rock
- Label: M10
- Producer: UPDLM

Ange chronology
Un P'tit Tour Et Puis S'en Vont : Live 1995 (1995)	La Voiture À Eau (1999)	Rêves Parties (2000)

La Voiture À Eau is a Studio album by the French progressive rock band Ange. It was released in 1999.

== Track listing ==
1. "Le Rêve Est À Rêver [2ème Service]" (Christian Decamps, Hassan Hajdi) – 05:55
2. "Psychosomagique Génie" (Christian Decamps, Tristan Decamps) – 06:20
3. "Eureka" (Tristan Decamps) – 02:24
4. "Bilboquet" (Christian Decamps) – 04:02
5. "Elle Fait Mes Rides" (Christian Decamps) – 03:33
6. "Eurékâ In Extenso" (Tristan Decamps) – 02:30
7. "L'eau Qui Dort" (Christian Decamps) – 05:02
8. "Archimède" (Christian Decamps, Tristan Decamps) – 03:55
9. "Coma Des Mortels" (Christian Decamps) – 05:01
10. "Quelquefois" (Christian Decamps, Samir Bouadi, David Moreau) – 04:30
11. "Ethnies" (Christian Decamps, Christian Decamps, Hervé Rouyer) – 05:12
12. "Patisonges Et Mentisseries" (Christian Decamps, Thierry Sidhoum) – 01:46
13. "Mémoires De Jacob Delafon" (Christian Decamps) – 05:14
14. "Et Gandhi L'indou Dit Tout Doux" (Christian Decamps) – 03:44
15. "La Serrure Ou La Clé" (Christian Decamps) – 04:17
16. "Jardin Secret" (Christian Decamps) – 04:55
17. "La Voiture À Eau" (Christian Decamps) – 03:55

== Personnel ==
- Lead Vocals, Acoustic Guitar, Keyboards: Christian Decamps
- Keyboards, Backing Vocals: Tristan Decamps
- Guitar, Backing Vocals: Hassan Hajdi
- Bass, Backing Vocals: Thierry Sidhoum
- Drums, Percussion: Hervé Rouyer
