= Par les fils de Mandrin =

Studio album by Ange
- Released: 1976
- Recorded: May–June 1976
- Studio: Studios de Dames, Paris
- Genre: Progressive rock
- Length: 41:19
- Label: Philips
- Producer: Claude Bibonne

Ange chronology
Émile Jacotey (1975)	Par les fils de Mandrin (1976)	Tome VI : Live 1977 (1977)

Professional ratings
Review scores
Source	Rating
Allmusic	4/5 stars

Par les fils de Mandrin is the fifth album by the French progressive rock band Ange, released in 1976.

== Track listing ==
1. "Par les fils de Mandrin" (C. Décamps/J.M. Brézovar) – 4:48
2. "Au café du Colibri" (C. Décamps/J.P. Guichard) – 4:02
3. "Ainsi s'en ira la pluie" (C. Décamps/J.P. Guichard) – 6:08
4. "Autour du feu" (C. Décamps/D. Haas) – 3:06
5. "Saltimbanques" (C. Décamps/D. Haas) – 3:36
6. "Des yeux couleur d'enfants" (C. Décamps/F. Décamps) – 4:20
7. "Atlantis - Les Géants de la 3ème lune" (C. Décamps/F. Décamps) – 5:05
8. "Hymne à la vie" (C. Décamps/J.M. Brézovar) – 9:44
  - "Cantique" – 4:16
  - "Procession" – 3:52
  - "Hymne" – 1:37

== Personnel ==
- Daniel Haas – bass, acoustic guitar
- Jean Michel Brezovar – electric guitar, acoustic guitar, vocals
- Jean Pierre Guichard – drums, percussion, harmonica, vocals
- Francis Decamps – organ, A.R.P. synthesizer, mellotron, vocals
- Christian Decamps – vocals, piano, percussion, accordion

== Release history ==
Date	Format	Label	Catalog
1976	LP	Philips	9101 090
1976	Cass	Philips	7102 536

== Certifications ==
Region	Certification	Certified units/sales
France (SNEP)	Gold	100,000^{*}
^{*} Sales figures based on certification alone.
