= Souffleurs De Vers =

Studio album by Ange
- Released: 2007
- Recorded: La Noiseraie, Saint-Bresson, Haute-Saône, 1 September 2004 - 21 February 2005
- Genre: Progressive rock
- Label: Wagram
- Producer: UPDLM

Ange chronology
Zénith An II (2007)	Souffleurs De Vers (2007)	Souffleurs De Vers Tour (2009)

Souffleurs De Vers is a Studio album by the French progressive rock band Ange. It was released in 2007.

== Track listing ==
1. "Tous Les Boomerangs Du Monde" (Christian Decamps) – 04:52
2. "Les Écluses" (Christian Decamps) – 04:57
3. "Dieu Est Un Escroc" (Christian Decamps) – 08:15
4. "Nouvelles Du Ciel" (Christian Decamps, Christian Decamps, Tristan Decamps) – 03:17
5. "Interlude" (Christian Decamps, Tristan Decamps, Caroline Crozat) – 02:01
6. "Où Vont Les Escargots ?" (Christian Decamps) – 04:20
7. "Coupée En Deux" (Christian Decamps) – 05:58
8. "Les Beaux Restes" (Christian Decamps) – 04:19
9. "Souffleurs De Vers [Synopsis]" (Christian Decamps, Tristan Decamps) – 03:07
10. "Souffleurs De Vers [Le Film]" (Christian Decamps) – 16:43
11. "Journal Intime" (Christian Decamps) – 02:33

== Personnel ==
- Lead Vocals, Acoustic Guitar, Keyboards, Accordion: Christian Decamps
- Vocals, Lead Vocals on "Coupée En Deux": Caroline Crozat
- Keyboards, Backing Vocals, Lead Vocals on "Nouvelles Du Ciel": Tristan Decamps
- Guitar, Backing Vocals: Hassan Hajdi
- Bass, Backing Vocals: Thierry Sidhoum
- Drums, Percussion: Benoît Cazzulini
