= Egna (album) =

Studio album by Ange
- Released: 1986
- Recorded: Superbar, Midibox, 06 Le Bar Sur Loup
- Genre: Progressive rock
- Label: Trema
- Producer: Jean-Pierre Massiera, Christian Decamps

Ange chronology
Fou (1984)	Egna (1986)	Tout Feu Tout Flamme... C'est Pour De Rire (1987)

Christian Décamps & Fils chronology
Le Mal D'Adam (1979)	Egna (1986)	Juste Une Ligne Bleue (1990)

Egna is a studio album by the French progressive rock band Ange. It was released in 1986.

== Track listing ==
Side One:

1. "C'est Après Coup Que Ça Fait Mal" (Christian Decamps, Francis Decamps) – 04:45
2. "Fais Pas La Gueule !" (Christian Decamps, Francis Decamps) – 04:40
3. "Revoir Les Sorcières De Salem" (Christian Decamps, Francis Decamps) – 03:25
4. "Les Dessins Animés" (Christian Decamps, Francis Decamps) – 03:05

Side Two:

1. "Cœur De Paille, Cœur De Pierre" (Christian Decamps, Francis Decamps) – 04:08
2. "Le Dernier Romantique" (Christian Decamps, Francis Decamps) – 04:20
3. "Le Cul Qui Jazze" (Christian Decamps, Francis Decamps) – 05:50
4. "Tout Comme Dans Un Livre" (Christian Decamps, Francis Decamps) – 05:27

== Personnel ==
- Male Vocals: Christian Decamps
- Keyboards: Francis "Didou" Decamps
- Guitar: Serge "Doudou" Cuenot
- Bass: Laurent Sigrist
- Drums, Percussion: Jean-Claude Potin
- Female Vocal: Martine Kesselburg

=== Additional musicians ===
- Programmation: Bernard Torelli
- Litter And Menus: Auberge Bretonne
