= Escale À Ch'tiland =

Live album by Ange
- Released: 2011
- Recorded: Théâtre Sébastopol, Lille, 19 March 2010
- Genre: Progressive rock
- Label: L'autre Distribution
- Producer: Christian Decamps

Ange chronology
Le Bois Travaille Même Le Dimanche (2010)	Escale À Ch'tiland (2011)	Moyen-Âge (2012)

Escale À Ch'tiland is a Live album by the French progressive rock band Ange. It was released in 2011.

== Track listing ==
Disc One:

1. "Ces Gens-Là" (Jacques Brel) – 05:50
2. "Le Cimetière Des Arlequins" (Christian Decamps, Gerard Jelsh) – 08:25
3. "Les Yeux D'un Fou" (Christian Decamps, Francis Decamps) – 04:16
4. "Le Rêve Est À Rêver [2ème Service]" (Christian Decamps, Hassan Hajdi) – 06:20
5. "Le Marchand De Planètes" (Christian Decamps, Guenolé Biger) – 07:33
6. "Sur La Trace Des Fées" (Christian Decamps, Jean-Michel Brezovar) – 06:00
7. "Les Eaux Du Gange" (Christian Decamps) – 05:23
8. "Neuf Heures" (Christian Decamps, Francis Decamps) – 05:23
9. "Les Collines Roses" (Caroline Crozat, Tristan Decamps) – 04:00
10. "Le Vieux De La Montagne" (Christian Decamps, Francis Decamps) – 08:10
11. "Couleurs En Colère" (Christian Decamps, Francis Decamps) – 07:20

Disc Two:

1. "Les Enfants Du Hasard" (Christian Decamps, Francis Decamps) – 06:30
2. "Capitaine Cœur De Miel" (Christian Decamps, Francis Decamps) – 19:10
3. "Hors-La-Loi" (Christian Decamps) – 05:20
4. "L'œil Et L'ouïe" (Christian Decamps) – 07:07
5. "Hymne À La Vie" (Christian Decamps, Jean-Michel Brezovar) – 12:47
  - "Cantique" (Christian Decamps, Jean-Michel Brezovar)
  - "Procession" (Christian Decamps, Jean-Michel Brezovar)
  - "Hymne" (Christian Decamps, Jean-Michel Brezovar)
6. "Shéhérazade" (Christian Decamps, Francis Decamps) – 04:55

DVD:

1. "Ces Gens-Là" (Jacques Brel) – 05:50
2. "Le Cimetière Des Arlequins" (Christian Decamps, Gerard Jelsh) – 08:25
3. "Les Yeux D'un Fou" (Christian Decamps, Francis Decamps) – 04:16
4. "Le Rêve Est À Rêver [2ème Service]" (Christian Decamps, Hassan Hajdi) – 06:20
5. "Le Marchand De Planètes" (Christian Decamps, Guenolé Biger) – 07:33
6. "Sur La Trace Des Fées" (Christian Decamps, Jean-Michel Brezovar) – 06:00
7. "Les Eaux Du Gange" (Christian Decamps) – 05:23
8. "Neuf Heures" (Christian Decamps, Francis Decamps) – 05:23
9. "Fou" (Christian Decamps, Francis Decamps)
10. "Le Vieux De La Montagne" (Christian Decamps, Francis Decamps) – 08:10
11. "Couleurs En Colère" (Christian Decamps, Francis Decamps) – 07:20
12. "Les Enfants Du Hasard" (Christian Decamps, Francis Decamps) – 06:30
13. "Capitaine Cœur De Miel" (Christian Decamps, Francis Decamps) – 19:10
14. "Hors-La-Loi" (Christian Decamps) – 05:20
15. "L'œil Et L'ouïe" (Christian Decamps) – 07:07
16. "Hymne À La Vie" (Christian Decamps, Jean-Michel Brezovar) – 12:47
  - "Cantique" (Christian Decamps, Jean-Michel Brezovar)
  - "Procession" (Christian Decamps, Jean-Michel Brezovar)
  - "Hymne" (Christian Decamps, Jean-Michel Brezovar)
17. "Shéhérazade" (Christian Decamps, Francis Decamps) – 04:55
18. "Le Ballon De Billy" (Christian Decamps, Francis Decamps)
19. "Ode À Émile" (Christian Decamps, Jean-Michel Brezovar)

Bonus:

1. "Le Pied En Coulisses [Documentaire]" (Amandine Pinto - Décamps)

== Personnel ==
- Lead Vocals, Keyboards, Guitar, Percussions: Christian Decamps
- Vocals, Percussions, Backing Vocals: Caroline Crozat
- Keyboards, Backing Vocals, Programming, Backing Vocals: Tristan Decamps
- Guitars, Backing Vocals: Hassan Hajdi
- Bass, Backing Vocals, Backing Vocals: Thierry Sidhoum
- Drums, Percussion: Benoit Cazzulini
