= Au-delà du délire =

Studio album by Ange
- Released: 1974
- Studio: Studio Des Dames
- Genre: Progressive rock
- Length: 37:57
- Label: Philips, Éditions Chappell
- Producer: Claude Gibonne

Ange chronology
Le Cimetière des arlequins (1973)	Au-delà du délire (1974)	Émile Jacotey (1975)

Professional ratings
Review scores
Source	Rating
Allmusic	4.5/5.0 stars

Au-delà du délire is the third album by the French progressive rock band Ange, released in 1974. The French edition of Rolling Stone magazine named this album the 73rd greatest French rock album (out of 100).

== Track listing ==
1. "Godevin le vilain" (C. Décamps) – 2:59
2. "Les Longues Nuits d'Isaac" (C. Décamps/F. Décamps) – 4:13
3. "Si j'étais le messie" (C. Décamps/G. Jelsch) – 3:03
4. "Ballade pour une orgie" (C. Décamps/J.M. Brézovar) – 3:20
5. "Exode" (C. Décamps/F. Décamps) – 4:59
6. "La Bataille du sucre (La Colère des dieux)" (C. Décamps/D. Haas) – 6:29
7. "Fils de lumière" (C. Décamps/F. Décamps) – 3:52
8. "Au-delà du délire" (C. Décamps/J.M. Brézovar) – 9:02

== Personnel ==
=== Ange ===
- Jean Michel Brezovar – guitar, vocals, flute
- Christian Décamps – Hammond organ, piano, harpsichord, vocals
- Francis Decamps – keyboards, vocals
- Daniel Haas – bass, guitar
- Gerald Jelsch – drums, percussion

=== Additional musicians ===
- Eric Bibonne – voice of the child on "La Bataille du sucre"
- Michel Lefloch – voice of Bernhard l'Hermite on "Au-delà du délire"
- Henry Loustau – violin on "Godevin le vilain"

== Release history ==
Date	Format	Label	Catalog
1974	LP	Philips	9101004
	CD	Philips; Phonogram	8422392; PG 899

== Certifications ==
Region	Certification	Certified units/sales
France (SNEP)	Gold	100,000^{*}
^{*} Sales figures based on certification alone.
