= Zénith An II =

Live album by Ange
- Released: 2007
- Recorded: Zenith, Paris, 13 October 2002
- Genre: Progressive rock
- Label: Muséa
- Producer: Muséa

Ange chronology
| Le Tour De La Question (2007) | Zénith An II (2007) | Souffleurs De Vers (2007) |

Zénith An II is a live album by the French progressive rock band Ange. It was released in 2007.

== Track listing ==
Disc One:

1. "Nonne Assistante À Personne À Tanger" (Christian Decamps, Francis Decamps) – 10:12
2. "Ethnies" (Christian Decamps, Christian Decamps, Hervé Rouyer) – 03:53
3. "Le Ballon De Billy" (Christian Decamps, Francis Decamps) – 07:42
4. "Adrénaline" (Christian Decamps) – 07:06
5. "Jusqu'où Iront-Ils" (Christian Decamps, Tristan Decamps) – 08:49
6. "Culinaire Lingus" (Christian Decamps) – 05:38
7. "Virgule" (Christian Decamps, Claude Demet) – 03:04
8. "Ode À Émile" (Christian Decamps, Jean-Michel Brezovar) – 03:30
9. "Sur La Trace Des Fées" (Christian Decamps, Jean-Michel Brezovar) – 05:08
10. "Au Delà Du Délire" (Christian Decamps, Jean-Michel Brezovar) – 08:59
11. "Le Bal Des Laze" (Pierre Delanoé, Michel Polnareff) – 07:11

Disc Two:

1. "Lola Bomembre - Sketch" (Christian Decamps, Caroline Crozat) – 02:32
2. "On Sexe" (Christian Decamps, Tristan Decamps) – 08:32
3. "Shéhérazade" (Christian Decamps, Francis Decamps) – 04:32
4. "Si J'étais Le Messie" (Christian Decamps, Gerard Jelsh) – 05:54
5. "Crever D'amour [Prélude]" (Christian Decamps, Francis Decamps) – 03:12
6. "Cadavres Exquis" (Christian Decamps) – 12:18
7. "Présentation" (Christian Decamps, Chraz) – 03:53
8. "Docteur Man" (Christian Decamps, Francis Decamps) – 04:00
9. "Vu D'un Chien" (Christian Decamps, Francis Decamps) – 08:14
10. "Ces Gens-Là" (Jacques Brel) – 06:35
11. "Autour D'un Cadavre Exquis" (Christian Decamps) – 11:19

== Personnel ==
- Lead Vocals, Acoustic Guitar, Keyboards: Christian Decamps
- Vocals: Caroline Crozat
- Keyboards, Backing Vocals: Tristan Decamps
- Guitar, Backing Vocals: Hassan Hajdi
- Bass, Backing Vocals: Thierry Sidhoum
- Drums, Percussion: Hervé Rouyer

=== Additional Musicians ===
- Presentation: Chraz
- Violin, on "Adrénaline": Gilles Pequinot
- Recorder, Gimbarde on "On sexe": Gilles Pequinot
- Acoustic Guitar on "Virgule", Guitar on "Autour D'un Cadavre Exquis": Claude Demet
- Bass on "Ode À Émile", "Sur La Trace Des Fées", "Au Delà Du Délire": Daniel Haas
- Drums on "Ode À Émile", "Sur La Trace Des Fées", Percussion on "Au Delà Du Délire": Guénolé Biger
- Vocals on "Shéhérazade": Francis Lalanne
- Vocals, Guitar on "Si J'étais Le Messie": Jean-Marc Miro
- Tablas on "Si J'étais Le Messie": Manu
- Guitar on "Vu D'un Chien", "Autour D'un Cadavre Exquis": Serge Cuenot
- Guitar on "Autour D'un Cadavre Exquis": Jean-Pascal Boffo
- Guitar on "Autour D'un Cadavre Exquis": Norbert Krief
- Painting: Juan Ramirez
