= Dave Lee Travis =

English radio and TV presenter (born 1945)

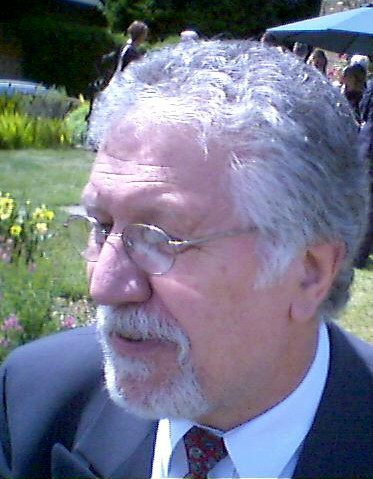
- Travis in 2004
- Born: David Patrick Griffin; 25 May 1945 (age 81); Buxton, Derbyshire, England
- Other names: DLT; The Hairy Monster; The Hairy Cornflake
- Occupations: Radio and television presenter
- Years active: 1965-2012, 2018-present
- Spouse: Marianne Bergqvist (m. 1971)

David Patrick Griffin (born 25 May 1945), known professionally as Dave Lee Travis, is an English disc jockey and television presenter. As of 2026 he presents a Sunday programme between 10 am and 12 noon on Heritage Chart Radio.

Travis began his broadcasting career on the pirate radio station Radio Caroline in 1965. He moved to BBC Radio 1, where he became one of the station's leading presenters during the 1970s and 1980s. He was a frequent presenter of BBC1 TV programme Top of the Pops. His other television work has included presenting The Golden Oldie Picture Show and providing commentary for the Eurovision Song Contest. Following his resignation from the BBC in 1993, he worked for several British commercial radio stations.

In November 2012, Travis was arrested by officers from Operation Yewtree on suspicion of historical sexual offences, which he denied. In February 2014, he was found not guilty on twelve of the counts, with the jury unable to reach a decision on two further counts. Travis faced a retrial on the two outstanding counts, with an additional alleged offence from 1995. The retrial began on 5 September 2014. On 23 September, he was found guilty of one count of indecent assault and on 26 September given a three-month prison sentence suspended for two years.

== Early life and career ==
Born in Buxton, Derbyshire, Travis was raised in Manchester. His father was a stage manager and he attended Manchester Central Grammar School for Boys.

Travis's first jobs were as a graphic designer, a designer of shop interiors and a photographer. At night and weekends he began working as a DJ at the Oasis Club in Manchester, making use of a Dansette autochanger. Giving up his other jobs, he went on a self-created and promoted UK tour of clubs, ballrooms and theatres presenting his own DJ shows. Consequently, he was asked by Herman's Hermits to become the tour manager and warm-up DJ on their next tour of the United States, supporting Bobby Vee and Freddy Cannon. On his return to the UK, Travis returned to the north of England and continued to promote his own shows in Blackpool, Bury and the surrounding areas.

== Radio ==
=== Radio Caroline ===
In September 1965, Travis started work at the offshore pirate radio station Radio Caroline South from the MV Mi Amigo off the Essex coast, later moving onto Radio Caroline North from the MV Fredericia off the Isle of Man until mid-August 1967. From spring 1966 until early 1969 he co-presented the monthly Beat-Club pop programme, on television in Germany together with Uschi Nerke.

=== BBC Radio 1 ===
In 1967, offshore pirate radio was outlawed by the Marine, &c., Broadcasting (Offences) Act 1967. Travis returned to Manchester to present the daily radio show Pop North on Radio 1 in 1968, and hosted Saturday afternoon programmes in the 4 to 5:30 pm slot. In 1969, he took over a Sunday morning show from 10 am to midday. In 1971, he was promoted to the weekday lunchtime show from 11 am to 1 pm, moving back to Sunday mornings in 1973 and also presenting the Radio 1 Club on Thursdays from 5 to 7 pm. He also presented the Sunday afternoon request show between 3 and 5 pm.

In 1976, an on-air parody of C. W. McCall's US hit "Convoy" led to a release of the song "Convoy GB" as a single, recorded with fellow DJ Paul Burnett under the name Laurie Lingo and the Dipsticks. The song reached number four in the UK Singles Chart and Travis appeared as the song's narrator "Super Scouse" on Top of the Pops.

In 1976, Travis took over the weekday teatime slot, 4:30pm–5:45pm (extended to run between 4:30pm–7pm in 1977). He then took over The Radio 1 Breakfast Show from Noel Edmonds in May 1978 and continued in this slot until January 1981. He nicknamed himself "the Hairy Cornflake" during his time as the Radio 1 Breakfast Show host, having previously used the nickname "The Hairy Monster".

In January 1981, Travis moved to weekday afternoons from 2:30pm to 4:30pm. Later that year he moved back to the weekday lunchtime slot from 11:30am to 2pm, before moving to a Saturday morning show in 1983 from 10am to 1pm, then Sunday mornings from 10am to 1pm in 1987, taking over both Saturday and Sunday in September 1988.

=== On-air resignation ===
On 8 August 1993, Travis resigned on-air during his Sunday morning show, stating that he could not agree with changes that were being made to Radio 1. Travis told his audience that changes were afoot that he could not tolerate "and I really want to put the record straight at this point and I thought you ought to know – changes are being made here which go against my principles and I just cannot agree with them".

=== A Jolly Good Show ===
From 1981 to 2001, Travis presented the BBC World Service music request programme A Jolly Good Show, having taken over from Noel Edmonds. In June 2011, Burmese pro-democracy leader Aung San Suu Kyi said the programme had given her a lifeline. The Nobel Peace Prize winner, who had spent 15 years under house arrest from 1989, told the BBC that A Jolly Good Show had made her "world much more complete". Travis said he was "touched" but "not surprised" that she had remembered it.

=== Since 1993 ===
On leaving Radio 1, Travis hosted a networked Sunday morning show (10am–1pm) across some of the UK's commercial radio stations. He later worked at Classic Gold.

In 2002, Travis left Classic Gold to work for the British Army's Garrison FM. From March 2003 to March 2007, Travis returned to the BBC, and presented a Sunday morning show from 9 am to noon on BBC Three Counties Radio, his local BBC radio station.

Travis is a member of the Radio Academy Hall of Fame.

Travis worked at the Magic Network from July 2006 until 2012. Following his arrest on sexual assault allegations, the station suspended him and did not renew his contract.

Travis returned to the airwaves in April 2018, presenting a Saturday show on United DJs Radio. He left in September 2018 due to back pain but returned on 29 February 2020. United DJs Radio closed down in May 2021.

In February 2025, it was announced Travis would be joining Heritage Chart Radio to host a Sunday-morning programme from 10 am to 12 noon, starting on 2 March 2025.

== Television ==
Travis presented the German TV show Beat-Club, where he introduced such acts as Cream, the Jimi Hendrix Experience and Steamhammer.

In November 1973, Travis first presented BBC1's Top of the Pops as a replacement for Kenny Everett. Travis remained a regular presenter until 1984. He was also the presenter of The Golden Oldie Picture Show in the mid-1980s, an attempt by the BBC to create videos for classic pop songs that pre-dated the video age.

Travis provided the UK commentary for the Eurovision Song Contest 1971 in Dublin, Ireland, and in 1985 presented the Eurovision Song Contest Previews on BBC1.

On 14 February 2000, Travis was the subject of the This Is Your Life programme on British TV.

Travis narrated various Granada Men & Motors programmes, such as Top Ten Bikes.

In 2007, Travis appeared in the video for the Comic Relief version of the Proclaimers song "I'm Gonna Be (500 Miles)", performed by Peter Kay and Matt Lucas.

Other TV appearances include The Weakest Link, Noel's House Party, The Mrs Merton Show, Stars Reunited, Kick Start, Dave's Lee's and Travis's and Today with Des and Mel.

== Conviction for indecent assault ==
In October 2012, two former BBC employees alleged that Travis had sexually assaulted several women during his time at the BBC. One of the women, who was 17 at the time, claimed in the media after making a formal statement to police that Travis put his hand up her skirt in 1977. The other, presenter Vivien Creegor, claimed Travis "jiggled her breasts" when she was live on BBC Radio 4 in the 1980s. On 15 November 2012, Travis was arrested at his home by the Metropolitan Police as part of the Operation Yewtree inquiry. He was the fourth person to be arrested as part of the investigation.

In October 2013, Travis was charged with 14 allegations of indecent assault and one of sexual assault between 1976 and 2008, relating to 11 female complainants aged between 15 and 29 at the time of the alleged offences. He pleaded not guilty and the trial began in January 2014 at Southwark Crown Court. On 13 February 2014, Travis was found not guilty on twelve counts, and the jury failed to reach a verdict on the remaining two counts. Following the verdict, Travis told reporters: "I do not feel like there is a victory in any way, shape or form. On the contrary, I think you already know that I have been through a year-and-a-half of hell on this." On 24 February, it was reported that the prosecution was seeking a retrial on the two outstanding counts.

On 28 March 2014, it was reported Travis would face another charge of indecent assault as well as the retrial on the two outstanding counts. On 15 April, it was reported he was facing another charge of indecent assault on a woman aged over 16 in 1995. He appeared at Westminster Magistrates' Court on 24 April, where he denied the charges. His trial began on 5 September at Southwark Crown Court. On 23 September, Travis was found guilty of indecently assaulting a female researcher working on The Mrs Merton Show in 1995. He was found not guilty of indecently assaulting another woman while appearing in a production of Aladdin in 1990. The jury was unable to reach a verdict on a third charge from 2008, involving a journalist who visited his home. On Friday 26 September 2014 he was sentenced to three months in prison, suspended for two years.

The Attorney General's office rejected four complaints that the sentence was too lenient. On 8 December 2015, the Court of Appeal rejected Travis's bid to overturn his conviction.

As a result of his conviction, episodes of Top of the Pops that were presented by Travis are no longer repeated.

== Personal life ==
As of 2014, Travis lived in Buckland, Buckinghamshire. On 6 May 1971, he married Marianne Bergqvist, who is originally from Sweden.

His interests include photography and classic cars. In 1987, he published a book of his photographs of well-known women, called A Bit of a Star, which he dedicated to his late father. In the 1970s, Travis was a regular drag racer.

Media offices
Preceded by David Gell	Eurovision Song Contest UK Commentator; 1971	Succeeded by Tom Fleming
Preceded by Noel Edmonds	BBC Radio 1 Breakfast Show Presenter; 1978–1980	Succeeded by Mike Read
