= Guet-apens =

Studio album by the French progressive rock band Ange (1978)

Studio album by Ange
- Released: 1978
- Studio: Studio 20
- Genre: Progressive Rock
- Label: Philips
- Producer: Ange, Claude Bibonne

Ange chronology
En concert : Live 1970-1971	Guet-apens	Vu d'un chien

Guet-apens is the sixth studio album by the French progressive rock band Ange and the first without Jean Michel Brezovar and Daniel Haas. It was released in 1978.

== Track listing ==
Side One:

1. "A Colin-Maillard" (Christian Decamps, Francis Decamps) – 08:06
2. "Dans les poches du berger" (Christian Decamps, Jean-Pierre Guichard) – 05:41
3. "Un trou dans la case" (Christian Decamps, Claude Demet) – 05:30
4. "Virgule" (Christian Decamps, Claude Demet) – 01:58

Side Two:

1. "Réveille-toi!" (Christian Decamps, Mick Piellard) – 05:25
2. "Capitaine Cœur de Miel" (Christian Decamps, Francis Decamps) – 14:00

== Personnel ==
- Christian Decamps – Lead Vocals, Acoustic Guitar, Keyboards
- Claude Demet – electric guitar, acoustic guitar
- Francis Decamps – Organ, A.R.P. Synthesizer, Keyboards, Backing Vocals
- Gerald Renard – bass, Backing Vocals
- Jean Pierre Guichard – drums, percussions
