= Le Bois Travaille Même Le Dimanche =

Studio album by Ange
- Released: 2010
- Recorded: La Noiseraie, Saint-Bresson, Haute-Saône, Dizzcover Studio, Liverdun, 10 August - 25 November 2009
- Genre: Progressive rock
- Label: UPDLM
- Producer: UPDLM

Ange chronology
Souffleurs De Vers Tour (2009)	Le Bois Travaille Même Le Dimanche (2010)	Escale À Ch'tiland (2011)

Le Bois Travaille Même Le Dimanche is a Studio album by the French progressive rock band Ange. It was released in 2010.

== Track listing ==
1. "Des Papillons, Des Cerfs Volants" (Christian Decamps) – 07:31
2. "Hors-La-Loi" (Christian Decamps) – 05:02
3. "Le Bois Travaille, Même Le Dimanche" (Christian Decamps) – 12:40
4. "Sous Le Nez De Pinocchio" (Christian Decamps) – 04:48
5. "Voyage En Autarcie" (Christian Decamps) – 07:05
6. "Jamais Seul" (Christian Decamps) – 03:30
7. "L'œil Et L'ouïe" (Christian Decamps) – 05:54
8. "Clown Blanc" (Christian Decamps) – 03:28
9. "Dames Et Dominos" (Christian Decamps) – 03:53
10. "Les Collines Roses" (Caroline Crozat, Tristan Decamps) – 03:51
11. "Ultime Atome (Anatomie D'un Conte À Rebours)" (Christian Decamps) – 03:51
12. "A L'ombre Des Pictogrammes" (Christian Decamps) – 06:27

== Personnel ==
- Vocals, Acoustic Guitar, Keyboards, Sequences, Accordion: Christian Decamps
- Vocals: Caroline Crozat
- Keyboards, Guitar, Sequences, Backing Vocals: Tristan Decamps
- Guitar, Backing Vocals: Hassan Hajdi
- Bass, Backing Vocals: Thierry Sidhoum
- Drums, Percussion: Benoît Cazzulini
- Producer, mixing: Laurent Lepagneau
