= Ross Hannaman =

British singer

Rosalind Judith Hannaman is a British singer, mostly active in the 1960s.

== Career ==
Hannaman was born and raised in London. She signed to EMI in 1967 to pursue a career in pop music. She was initially managed by Tim Rice, and he and Andrew Lloyd Webber wrote both of her singles and their subsequent B-sides. Her debut single, "Down Thru' Summer" (b/w "I’ll Give All My Love to Southend"), was released in 1967. It received airplay on the offshore pirate radio station Radio London, made the station's Fab 40 chart, but did not feature in the official UK Singles Chart. Shortly afterward her second single, "1969", was released. Its B-side was a lush ballad titled "Probably on Thursday". Like its predecessor, "1969" went nowhere on the UK chart and Hannaman's solo career ended. Both of the singles are very rare and highly sought after by Andrew Lloyd Webber and Tim Rice collectors.

In the liner notes of the 2006 CD compilation, That's my Story (Sunbeam SBRCD5017), Tim Rice notes that it was he who played tambourine on "I'll Give all my Love to Southend".

Ross was named "face of the year" in 1968 by the Evening Standard, and she then married EMI producer Mark Wirtz. They wrote songs using the aliases "Philwit and Bigsby". Together and under the name The Sweetshop, Wirtz and Hannaman recorded the song "Barefoot and Tiptoe", as part of his unfinished recording A Teenage Opera. Wirtz and Hannaman subsequently divorced.

== Singles ==
- "Down Thru' Summer"/"I'll Give All My Love to Southend" (1967, Columbia DB8217)
- "1969"/"Probably on Thursday" (1967, Columbia DB8288)

The Sweetshop

- "Barefoot and Tiptoe" (Parlophone R5707)

== Re-releases ==
- "Barefoot & Tiptoe" appears on the RPM CD A Teenage Opera.
- Andrew Lloyd Webber: Now & Forever five-CD box set (2003) contains "Down Thru' Summer" (although an edited version) and "I'll Give All My Love to Southend" on disc 5.
- Go Girl: Dream Babes Volume Four (2003) contains an edited version of "Down Thru' Summer" (identical to the Andrew Lloyd Webber: Now & Forever release) as well as a mini-biography of Hannaman. It also includes a photo from a magazine article and a very rare colour photo of Hannaman with Mark Wirtz.
- That’s My Story by Tim Rice & Friends (2006) contains both singles from 1967, as well as their B-sides.
  - This re-release contains "Down Thru' Summer" in its entirety, as it appears on the original vinyl single; when re-released on the other compilations listed, two unique lines were cut near the end of the song.

== Sheet music ==
- "Down Thru' Summer" (1967)

== Song cover ==
- A demo version of the song "Probably On Thursday" was recorded with a slightly different melody, as well as some lyrical changes, in 1989 by Sarah Brightman, at the time the wife of Andrew Lloyd Webber; this was released in 2005 on the CD Love Changes Everything, a compilation of Brightman's work with Lloyd Webber. The title is mis-printed on the album packaging as "Probably On A Thursday". Brightman never sings the word "a" during the song.
