= Souffleurs De Vers Tour =

Live album by Ange
- Released: 2009
- Recorded: Le Splendid, Lille, 15 March 2008
- Genre: Progressive rock
- Label: Wagram
- Producer: UPDLM

Ange chronology
Souffleurs De Vers (2007)	Souffleurs De Vers Tour (2009)	Le Bois Travaille Même Le Dimanche (2010)

Souffleurs De Vers Tour is a live album by the French progressive rock band Ange. It was released in 2009.

== Track listing ==
1. "Tous Les Boomerangs Du Monde" (Christian Decamps) – 04:39
2. "La Gare De Troyes" (Christian Decamps, Francis Decamps) – 04:48
3. "Exode" (Christian Decamps, Francis Decamps) – 05:00
4. "Dieu Est Un Escroc" (Christian Decamps) – 09:02
5. "La Bête" (Christian Decamps) – 08:09
6. "Aurélia" (Christian Decamps, Jean-Michel Brezovar) – 03:40
7. "Nouvelles Du Ciel" (Christian Decamps, Christian Decamps, Tristan Decamps) – 04:55
8. "Coupée En Deux" (Christian Decamps) – 07:04
9. "Je Travaille Sans Filet" (Christian Decamps, Francis Decamps) – 07:20
10. "Souffleurs De Vers [Le Film]" (Christian Decamps) – 19:00

DVD:

1. "Tous Les Boomerangs Du Monde" (Christian Decamps)
2. "La Gare De Troyes" (Christian Decamps, Francis Decamps)
3. "Exode" (Christian Decamps, Francis Decamps)
4. "Dieu Est Un Escroc" (Christian Decamps)
5. "La Bête" (Christian Decamps)
6. "Aurélia" (Christian Decamps, Jean-Michel Brezovar)
7. "Nouvelles Du Ciel" (Christian Decamps, Christian Decamps, Tristan Decamps)
8. "Coupée En Deux" (Christian Decamps)
9. "Je Travaille Sans Filet" (Christian Decamps, Francis Decamps)
10. "Saga" (Christian Decamps, Francis Decamps)
11. "Ode À Émile" (Christian Decamps, Jean-Michel Brezovar)
12. "Souffleurs De Vers [Synopsis]" (Christian Decamps, Tristan Decamps)
13. "Souffleurs De Vers [Le Film]" (Christian Decamps)

DVD - Bonus Tracks:

1. "Les Beaux Restes" (Christian Decamps - Christian Decamps)
2. "Saga [Version Longue]" (Francis Decamps)
3. "Les Noces" (Christian Decamps, Guenolé Biger)
4. "Quasimodo" (Christian Decamps)
5. "Galerie Photos" (Christian Decamps)

== Personnel ==
- Lead Vocals, Acoustic Guitar, Keyboards, Accordion: Christian Decamps
- Vocals, Percussion: Caroline Crozat
- Keyboards, Backing Vocals: Tristan Decamps
- Guitar, Backing Vocals: Hassan Hajdi
- Bass, Backing Vocals: Thierry Sidhoum
- Drums, Percussion: Benoît Cazzulini
