= Keith West =

English rock singer and songwriter (born 1944)

- Born: Keith Alan Hopkins; 6 December 1944 (age 81); Dagenham, Essex, England
- Occupations: Singer, songwriter
- Years active: Mid-1960s–present
- Labels: Parlophone, Kuckuck (FRG)
- Formerly of: Tomorrow, The In Crowd, Moonrider

Keith Alan Hopkins (born 6 December 1944, Dagenham, Essex, England), known by his stage name Keith West, is a British rock singer, songwriter and music producer. He is best known for his single "Excerpt from A Teenage Opera" ("Grocer Jack"), which reached No. 2 on the UK Singles Chart.

West was also the lead singer of various groups including Tomorrow, a 1960s psychedelic rock band. West wrote most of his own songs (credited to Keith Hopkins), often in collaboration with Ken Burgess. Despite critical acclaim and support from BBC Radio 1 DJ John Peel, who featured Tomorrow on his The Perfumed Garden show, the group was not a major commercial success.

== Career ==
In 1964, West became lead singer of The In Crowd, a band from London, who later changed their name to Tomorrow. The following year The In Crowd recorded three singles for Parlophone. Another member of these groups was guitarist Steve Howe, later of the band Yes.

In 1967, West became acquainted with Mark Wirtz, a record producer who had already created the instrumental title "A Touch of Velvet, a Sting of Brass" (1965). The melody later became the theme music for the German television programmes Beat-Club and Musikladen. West was also a participant in Wirtz's A Teenage Opera project: he was the singer of "Excerpt from A Teenage Opera", also known as "Grocer Jack", which reached number 2 on the UK Singles Chart in 1967. He also performed "Sam", which reached the bottom end of the UK Top 40 the same year.

In August 1967, Tomorrow released a single of a Hopkins/Howe song titled "Revolution". West released the solo single "On a Saturday" on Parlophone in 1968. Other musicians who appeared on that single were guitarist Howe, bassist Ronnie Wood, and drummer Aynsley Dunbar. It has since been included on the remastered CD version of the Tomorrow album (1999).

In 1971, West released a solo album, Wherever My Love Goes, on the German progressive rock record label Kuckuck. It featured his songwriting partner Ken Burgess and steel guitarist Glenn Ross Campbell (ex-The Misunderstood). Two tracks on the album were produced by Andrew Loog Oldham.

By the mid-1970s, West was the lead singer of a group called Moonrider, which also featured John Weider, Chico Greenwood (later to perform with Murray Head) and Bruce Thomas.

Today, West continues to produce and record music, which is used primarily within the advertising industry. He is also associated with Burns Guitars.

In 2021, the official biography of Keith West was published in the book Thinking About Tomorrow – Excerpts from the life of Keith West.

== Discography ==
=== Albums ===
- Wherever My Love Goes (1971)

=== Singles ===
Year	Single	Chart Positions					
Year	Single	UK	BEL	DE	NLD	NZ	US
1967	"Excerpt from A Teenage Opera"	2	2	2	1	10	109 (Note: Bubbling Under chart)
1967	"Sam"	38	—	—	Tip	—	—
1968	"On A Saturday"	—	—	—	—	—	—
"—" denotes releases that did not chart or were not released to that territory
