= Ange (band) =

French progressive rock band

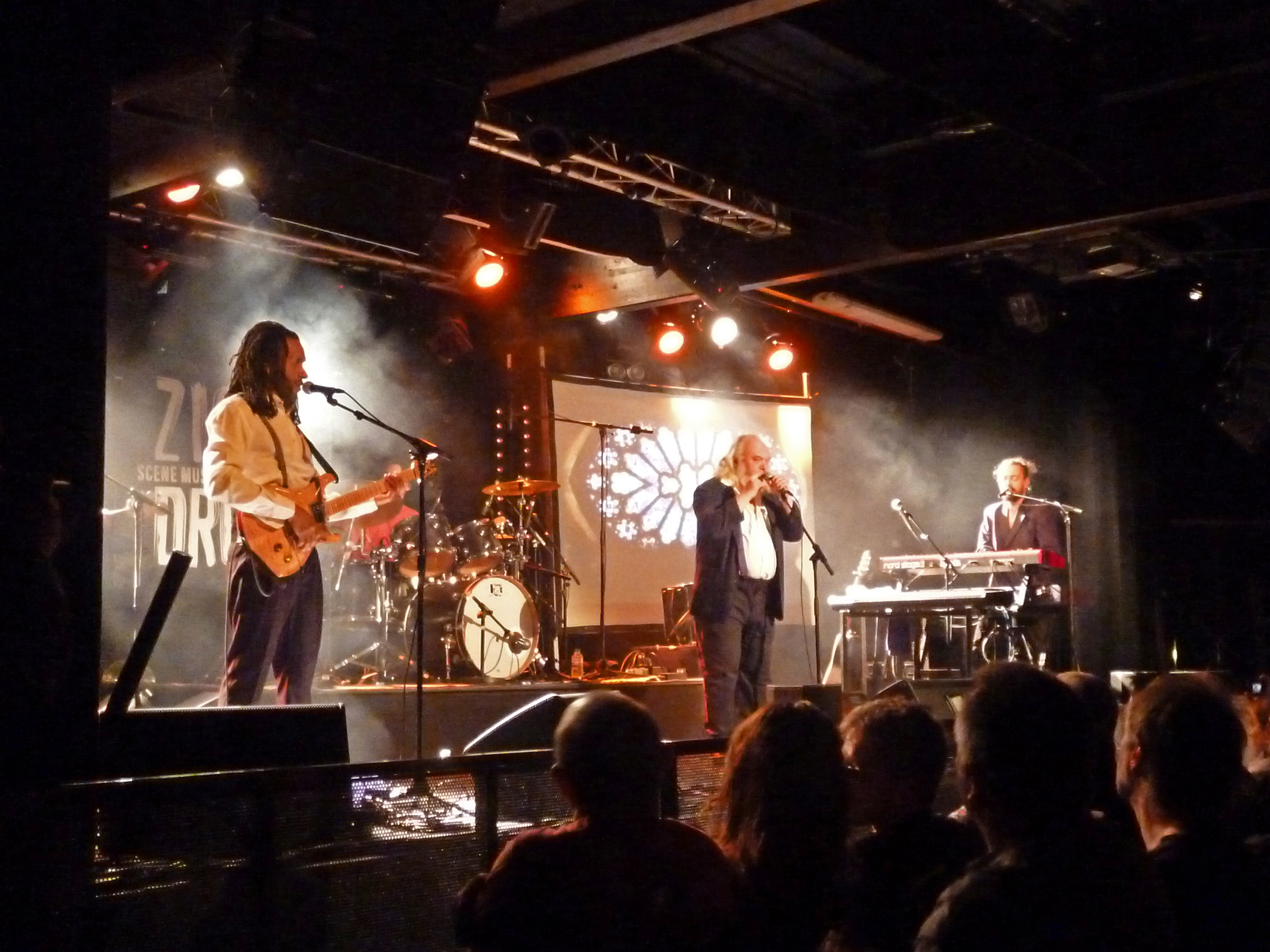
- Ange's concert in Compiègne, on 7 May 2016.

Background information
- Origin: Belfort, Bourgogne-Franche-Comté, France
- Genres: Progressive rock
- Years active: 1969–1995; 1999–present
- Labels: Verycords, Artdisto, Musea, Sergent Major Cie (early), Philips Records (early)
- Members: Christian Décamps; Tristan Décamps; Thierry Sidhoum; Benoit Cazzulini; Hassan Hajdi
- Past members: Francis Décamps; Jean-Michel Brézovar; Daniel Haas; Gérard Jelsch; Frederick Chojnacki
- Website: www.ange-updlm.com

Ange (French pronunciation: [ɑ̃ʒ], lit. 'Angel') is a French progressive rock band formed in September 1969 by the Décamps brothers, Francis (keyboards) and Christian (vocals, accordion, acoustic guitar and keyboards).

Since its inception the band's music has been inspired by medieval texts and fantasy.

== History ==
Ange was initially influenced by Procol Harum and King Crimson, and their music was quite theatrical and poetic. Their first success in France was the cover of a Jacques Brel song, Ces gens-là, on their second album Le Cimetière des Arlequins. The band provided its first concert on January 30, 1970, at the cultural center "La Pépinière", in Belfort, France. They performed 110 concerts in England from 1973 to 1976, opening for Genesis at the Reading Festival in England, on August 26, 1973, fronting some 30.000 listeners.

One of the reasons for which the band was unable to break through into the British market was because they sang in French. Ange eventually released an English-speaking version of its fifth album Par les fils de Mandrin (By the sons of Mandrin), which was hard to find and sold poorly, although this version has since been made available on CD. Unfortunately, after three albums, the quality of creation had started to decrease, and Par les fils de Mandrin was probably not a good choice to try to break into the British market.

Following Par les fils de Mandrin and the live double album Tome VI, the band issued a mellotron–centered album, Guet-apens, and then had a more rock-oriented change of direction, although various progressive reformations occurred over the years, e.g. for the 1992 album Les larmes du Dalaï-Lama. Sponsored by the French radio RTL, Ange relentlessly toured until the end of 1977, welcoming an average of 5,000 to 6,000 listeners per show. During their first years (generally regarded as the best ones), the other three members of the band were Jean-Michel Brézovar on guitar and flute, Gérard Jelsch on drums, and Daniel Haas on bass (and acoustic guitar). In 1995, Ange played their farewell tour.

Christian Décamps released a few albums as "Christian Décamps et Fils" ("Christian Décamps and Son"), before taking over the name "Ange" in 1999, and is backed by his band for his solo albums. The new lineup has issued several albums from La voiture à eau in 1999, performed on 2006 edition of NEARfest and is still on the road in 2025.

Francis Décamps and Jean-Michel Brézovar have also released solo albums.

== Keyboards ==
The keyboard sounds of the '70s-era band, while reminiscent of a mellotron, were in fact generated from a Viscount organ through a modded Hammond reverb. However, an actual mellotron was played on the album Par Les Fils De Mandrin in 1976.

== Studio discography ==
- (1972) Caricatures
- (1973) Le Cimetière des arlequins
- (1974) Au-delà du délire
- (1975) Émile Jacotey
- (1976) Par les fils de Mandrin
- (1978) Guet-Apens
- (1980) Vu d'un Chien
- (1981) Moteur!
- (1982) À propos de...
- (1983) La Gare de Troyes
- (1984) Fou
- (1986) Egna
- (1987) Tout Feu Tout Flamme... C'est Pour De Rire
- (1989) Sève Qui Peut
- (1992) Les Larmes Du Dalaï Lama
- (1999) La Voiture À Eau
- (2001) Culinaire Lingus
- (2005) ?
- (2007) Souffleurs De Vers
- (2010) Le Bois Travaille Même Le Dimanche
- (2012) Moyen-Âge
- (2014) Émile Jacotey Résurrection
- (2018) Heureux
- (2025) Cunégonde

== Complete discography ==
=== Christian and Francis Décamps era ===
- Caricatures (1972)
- Le Cimetière des arlequins (1973)
- Au-delà du délire (1974)
- Émile Jacotey (1975)
- Par les fils de Mandrin (1976)
- Tome VI : Live 1977 (1977, 2LP, 1CD)
- En concert : Live 1970-1971 (1977, 2LP, 1CD)
- Guet-Apens (1978)
- Vu D'un Chien (1980)
- Moteur! (1981)
- À propos de... (1982)
- La Gare de Troyes (1983)
- Fou (1984)
- Egna (1986)
- Tout Feu Tout Flamme... C'est Pour De Rire (1987)
- Sève Qui Peut (1989)
- Vagabondages (Compilation) (1989)
- Les Larmes Du Dalaï Lama (1992)
- Mémo (Compilation) (1994)
- Un P'tit Tour Et Puis S'en Vont : Live 1995 (2CD, 1995)
- Ad Libitum (3CD Compilation, 1999)
- Tome 87 (Live) (2002)
- Ange En Concert : Par Les Fils De Mandrin (Millésimé 77) (2003)

=== Christian and Tristan Décamps era ===
- La Voiture À Eau (1999)
- Rêves Parties (2000, live, 2CD)
- Culinaire Lingus (2001)
- ? (2005)
- Le Tour De La Question (2007)
- Zénith An II (2007, live, 2CD)
- Souffleurs De Vers (2007)
- Souffleurs De Vers Tour (Live CD+DVD, 2009)
- Le Bois Travaille Même Le Dimanche (2010)
- Escale À Ch'tiland (2CD+DVD, 2011, live)
- Moyen-Âge (2012)
- Emile Jacotey Résurrection (2014)
- Emile Jacotey Résurrection Live (CD+DVD, 2015)
- La Bataille du sucre (2015, ltd ed w/ 4 songs)
- Heureux (2018)

=== Christian Décamps & Fils ===
- Le Mal D'Adam (1979)
- Juste Une Ligne Bleue (1990)
- Nu (1994)
- V'soul Vesoul V'soul (1995)
- 3ème Étoile À Gauche (1997)
- Poèmes De La Noiseraie (1998)
- Murmures (2003)
- Psychédélice (2008)

- From 1997 on, Ange Fanclub Un pied dans la marge has produced at least 20 CD or DVD containing mostly live material.

== Personnel ==
=== Current members ===
- Christian Décamps - Lead vocals, Keyboards (after 1970)
- Tristan Décamps - Keyboards, Backing Vocals (after 1997)
- Hassan Hajdi - Guitars (after 1997)
- Thierry Sidhoum - Bass (after 1997)
- Benoît Cazzulini - Drums (after 2003)

=== Former Members ===
- Francis Décamps - Keyboards, Vocals (1970–1995)
- Jean-Michel Brézovar - Guitars (1970–1977, 1988–1989, 1991–1995)
- Jean-Claude Rio - Rhythmic Guitar (1970)
- Patrick Kachanian - Bass, Flute (1970)
- Daniel Haas - Bass (1971–1977, 1988–1995)
- Gérard Jelsch - Drums, Percussions (1970–1974, 1994–1995)
- Guénolé Biger - Drums, Percussions (1975)
- Jean-Pierre Guichard - Drums (1976–1981, 1988–1992)
- Claude Demet - Guitars (1978, 1990)
- Gérald Renard - Bass (1978–1979)
- Mauro Serri - Guitars (1979)
- Jean-Marie Schreiner - Drums (1979, 1990)
- J. Frieden - Keyboards (1979)
- J. Migaud - Keyboards (1979)
- Robert Defer - Guitars (1980–1981, 1990)
- Didier Viseux - Bass (1980–1981)
- Frederick Chojnacki - Bass (1980–1981)
- Serge Cuénot - Guitars (1982–1987, 1990)
- Laurent Sigrist - Bass (1982–1987)
- Gabriel Troyan - Bass in Tout feu tout flamme (1987)
- Jean-Claude Potin - Drums (1982–1986)
- Francis Meyer - Drums (1987)
- Martine Kesselburg - Choir in Tout feu tout flamme (1987) - Vocals (1990)
- Eva Santi - Choir in Tout feu tout flamme (1987)
- Bruno Nion - Vocals in Sève qui peut (1989)
- Fabrice Bony - Drums (1993)
- Jean-Pascal Boffo - Guitars (1995)
- Hervé Rouyer - Drums, Percussions (1995, 1997–2002)
- Caroline Crozat - Vocals, Choir (2001–2010)

== Bibliography ==
- Ange, le livre des légendes subtitled L'anthologie définitive sur le groupe mythique du rock français by Thierry Busson, Xavier Chatagnon and Bruno Versmisse, 292 pages, Éclipse éditions, 1995. ISBN 2-911494-00-8

== See also ==
- Timeline of progressive rock
