= Fou (album) =

Studio album by Ange
- Released: 1984
- Recorded: Superbar, Midibox, 06 Le Bar Sur Loup
- Genre: Progressive rock
- Label: Trema
- Producer: Jean-Pierre Massiera, Christian Decamps

Ange chronology
La Gare de Troyes (1983)	Fou (1984)	Egna (1986)

Christian Décamps & Fils chronology
Le Mal D'Adam (1979)	Fou (1984)	Juste Une Ligne Bleue (1990)

Fou is a concept album by the French progressive rock band Ange. It was released in 1984.

== Track listing ==
Side One:

1. "Les Yeux D'un Fou" (Christian Decamps, Francis Decamps) – 03:55
2. "(Je N'suis) Là Pour Personne" (Christian Decamps, Francis Decamps) – 04:10
3. "Piège À Cœur" (Christian Decamps, Francis Decamps) – 03:59
4. "Harmonie" (Christian Decamps, Francis Decamps) – 03:44
5. "(Hé !) Cobaye" (Christian Decamps, Francis Decamps) – 03:33

Side Two:

1. "Les Fous Demandent Un Roi" (Christian Decamps, Philippe Farrari, Francis Decamps) – 05:27
2. "Guignols" (Christian Decamps, Francis Decamps) – 03:28
3. "Guignols [La Chasse]" (Christian Decamps, Francis Decamps) – 02:07
4. "Fou" (Christian Decamps, Francis Decamps) – 04:12
5. "Crever D'amour [Prélude]" (Christian Decamps, Francis Decamps) – 02:40
6. "Crever D'amour [Coït Terminal]" (Christian Decamps, Philippe Farrari, Francis Decamps) – 04:20

== Personnel ==
- Lead Vocals, Pianos: Christian Decamps
- Keyboards, Backing Vocals: Francis Decamps
- Guitar: Serge Cuenot
- Bass: Laurent Sigrist
- Drums, Percussion: Jean-Claude Potin

=== Additional Musicians ===
- Sequences: Fred Betin
- Drums Machines: Jean-Claude Potin
- Litter And Menus: Auberge des Santons
