= Musikladen =

German music television programme (1972-1984)

- Genre: Music
- Presented by: Manfred Sexauer; Uschi Nerke; Auwa; Christine Röthig
- Theme music composer: Mark Wirtz
- Country of origin: West Germany
- Original language: German
- No. of episodes: 90

Production
- Producer: Mike Leckebusch
- Production locations: Bremen, West Germany
- Camera setup: Studio Hamburg
- Running time: 30–75 minutes

Original release
- Network: Radio Bremen
- Release: 13 December 1972 – 29 November 1984

Related
- Beat-Club; Extratour

Musikladen (German: The Music Shop) is a West German music television programme that ran from 1972 to 1984. The show continued the 1960s Beat-Club under a new name, and in turn was replaced by Extratour.

== History ==
Around ninety episodes were aired, plus fifty-nine as Musikladen extra, with most being made in the period between 1974 and 1979. All episodes were produced by Radio Bremen and directed by Michael Leckebusch.

A normal episode of Musikladen usually featured several live performances by guest musicians, and ran around forty-five minutes. Some episodes were longer, and a few were shorter. In the 1980s, music videos were shown along with live performances. The show's theme was "A Touch of Velvet – A Sting of Brass" by Mood Mosaic, which had also been used on Beat-Club.

In 1977, Dolly Parton appeared as a guest on the show, performing her song "Do I Ever Cross Your Mind".

Manfred Sexauer hosted the show with various others. From 12 December 1972 to 20 August 1979, Uschi Nerke, the veteran from Beat-Club, moderated the programme with Sexauer. After she left, 'Auwa' (August-Walter Thiemann) joined. He would stay for a year, quitting on 15 January 1981, with Sexauer handling the hosting duties alone until 3 May 1984, when he was joined by Christine Röthig. They both moderated Musikladen until its end on 29 November 1984.

Clips from the program can now be seen on VH1 Classic, and several DVD compilations have been released. All the episodes air frequently in an edited form, mostly after midnight, on various German television stations, like NDR, RBB and BFS (BR3). 3Sat also airs Musikladen occasionally.

== The Go-Go Girls ==
The Go-Go Girls were dancers who choreographed to songs on the Musikladen shows. The original Go-Go Girls - Monika, Sally and Sylvia - were chosen in 1977 and first appeared in Episode 33. After Sylvia left the show, Angelika was added in Episode 47 (December 1979). The trio remained with the show until its end in 1984.
