= Le Tour de la question (Ange album) =

Le Tour De La Question

Live album by Ange
- Released: 2007
- Recorded: Mix Festival, Vielsam, Belgium, 12 November 2005
- Genre: Progressive rock
- Label: Wagram
- Producer: Didier Leonard

Ange chronology
? (Point D'interrogation) (2005)	Le Tour De La Question (2007)	Zénith An II (2007)

Le Tour de la question is a Live album by the French progressive rock band Ange. It was released in 2007.

== Track listing ==
1. "Aujourd'hui C'est La Fête Chez L'apprenti Sorcier" (Christian Decamps, Jean-Michel Brezovar) – 05:00
2. "Le Couteau Suisse" (Christian Decamps, Tristan Decamps) – 03:58
3. "Histoires D'Outre Rêve" (Christian Decamps) – 10:37
4. "Vu D'un Chien" (Christian Decamps, Francis Decamps) – 06:40
5. "Si J'étais Le Messie" (Christian Decamps, Gerard Jelsh) – 04:31
6. "Jour Après Jour" (Christian Decamps, Francis Decamps) – 06:41
7. "Entre Foutre Et Foot" (Christian Decamps) – 03:00
8. "Harmonie" (Christian Decamps, Francis Decamps) – 07:20
9. "Le Cœur À Corps" (Caroline Crozat, Caroline Crozat, Christian Decamps) – 05:03
10. "Le Chien, La Poubelle Et La Rose" (Christian Decamps, Francis Decamps) – 08:53
11. "Ces Gens-Là" (Jacques Brel) – 06:07

DVD:

1. "Le Tour De La Question [Poème]" (Christian Decamps) – 01:48
2. "Le Couteau Suisse" (Christian Decamps, Tristan Decamps) – 03:55
3. "Aujourd'hui C'est La Fête Chez L'apprenti Sorcier" (Christian Decamps, Jean-Michel Brezovar) – 04:40
4. "Ricochets" (Christian Decamps) – 07:13
5. "Histoires D'Outre Rêve" (Christian Decamps) – 10:34
6. "Vu D'un Chien" (Christian Decamps, Francis Decamps) – 06:23
7. "Si J'étais Le Messie" (Christian Decamps, Gerard Jelsh) – 04:42
8. "Jour Après Jour" (Christian Decamps, Francis Decamps) – 06:22
9. "Entre Foutre Et Foot" (Christian Decamps) – 03:52
10. "Harmonie" (Christian Decamps, Francis Decamps) – 07:06
11. "Le Cœur À Corps" (Caroline Crozat, Caroline Crozat, Christian Decamps) – 05:02
12. "Le Ballon De Billy" (Christian Decamps, Francis Decamps) – 08:25
13. "Gag [Parodie De "L'été Indien"]" – 01:36
14. "Jazzouillis" (Christian Decamps) – 03:58
15. "Fils De Lumière" (Christian Decamps, Francis Decamps) – 07:02
16. "Le Chien, La Poubelle Et La Rose" (Christian Decamps, Francis Decamps) – 07:37
17. "Ces Gens-Là" (Jacques Brel) – 06:11
18. "Quasimodo" (Christian Decamps) – 13:45
19. "Capitaine Cœur De Miel" (Christian Decamps, Francis Decamps) – 18:43

== Personnel ==
- Lead Vocals, Acoustic Guitar, Keyboards, Accordion: Christian Decamps
- Vocals: Caroline Crozat
- Keyboards, Backing Vocals: Tristan Decamps
- Guitar, Backing Vocals: Hassan Hajdi
- Bass, Backing Vocals: Thierry Sidhoum
- Drums, Percussion: Benoît Cazzulini
