= Moteur! =

Studio album by Ange
- Released: 1981
- Recorded: Maison Rouge Studio, London SW6
- Genre: Progressive rock
- Label: Philips
- Producer: Ken Burgess

Ange chronology
Vu d'un ahien (1979)	Moteur! (1981)	À propos de... (1982)

Christian Décamps & Fils chronology
Le Mal d'Adam (1979)	Moteur! (1981)	Juste une ligne bleue (1990)

Moteur! is a studio album by the French progressive rock band Ange. It was released in 1981.

== Track listing ==
Side One:

1. "Tant pis l'indien" (Christian Decamps, Francis Decamps) – 03:48
2. "Saga" (Christian Decamps, Francis Decamps) – 05:08
3. "Rien n'est trop beau pour toi" (Christian Decamps, Francis Decamps) – 02:07
4. "Mourir, souffrir" (Christian Decamps, Didier Viseux) – 03:35
5. "Touchez pas à mon ciné" (Christian Decamps, Francis Decamps) – 05:09

Side Two:

1. "Détective privé" (Christian Decamps, Francis Decamps, Didier Viseux) – 03:02
2. "Un autre jazz" (Christian Decamps, Francis Decamps) – 03:15
3. "Moi, pas idiot !" (Christian Decamps, Francis Decamps) – 04:10
4. "Assis !" (Christian Decamps, Francis Decamps) – 05:24
5. "Chatte, chatte" (Christian Decamps, Francis Decamps) – 04:05

== Personnel ==
- Lead Vocals, Pianos: Christian Decamps
- Keyboards, Backing Vocals: Francis Decamps
- Guitar: Robert Defer
- Bass, Backing Vocals: Didier Viseux
- Drums, Percussion: Jean-Pierre Guichard
