= Le Fou =

Le Fou or Lefou may refer to:

- Judex Lefou (b. 1966), a Mauritian hurdler
- Le Fou (Disney), a character in Disney's Beauty and the Beast

== See also ==
- Le Fou d'Elsa, a 1963 novel written by Louis Aragon
- Pierrot le Fou, a 1965 film directed by Jean-Luc Godard
