= Manfred Sexauer =

German radio and television host (1930–2014)

Manfred Sexauer (2 August 1930 – 20 July 2014) was a German radio and television host, most notable of the German music show Der Musikladen. From 1964, Sexauer worked as a television moderator at Saarländischer Rundfunk. He was a recipient of the Saarland Order of Merit (1989) and the German Cross of Merit (2000).
