= Tomorrow (band) =

English musical group (1967–1968)

- Origin: London, England
- Genres: Psychedelic rock; psychedelic pop; freakbeat
- Years active: 1967–1968
- Labels: Parlophone/EMI, Harvest Heritage/EMI, Sire
- Past members: Keith West; Steve Howe; John "Junior" Wood; John "Twink" Alder

Tomorrow (previously known as the In Crowd and Four Plus One) were an English musical group active in the 1960s, whose music touched on psychedelic rock, pop and freakbeat. Despite critical acclaim and support from DJ John Peel, who featured them on his radio show The Perfumed Garden, the band never achieved great commercial success.

They were among the first psychedelic bands in England, along with Pink Floyd and Soft Machine. Tomorrow recorded the first John Peel show session on BBC Radio 1 on 21 September 1967. The band included Keith West (of "Excerpt from A Teenage Opera" fame) on vocals, and Steve Howe (who would later join the British progressive rock band Yes) on guitars.

== History ==
As the In Crowd, (not to be confused with the "Questions and Answers" In Crowd) they recorded the songs "Am I Glad to See You" and "Blow-Up" especially for the film Blowup in 1966. The two songs remained unused when the Yardbirds were hired to film the nightclub sequence that the In Crowd would have appeared in.

As Tomorrow, they appeared in the 1967 film Smashing Time under the name of the Snarks. Bassist Junior (real name John Wood) was ill during shooting of the film and was replaced by John Pearce, a clothes dealer. Again, their music was not used in the film. Instead, the music used in the film is performed by Skip Bifferty.

During 1967 the band released two singles, one of which, "My White Bicycle", was later covered by heavy rock act Nazareth, and as a novelty record by Neil the Hippy (Nigel Planer) of the British sitcom The Young Ones. According to drummer Twink, the song was inspired by the Dutch Provos, an anarchist group in Amsterdam that had instituted a community bicycle program: "they had white bicycles in Amsterdam and they used to leave them around the town. And if you were going somewhere and you needed to use a bike, you'd just take the bike and you'd go somewhere and just leave it. Whoever needed the bikes would take them and leave them when they were done."

In Joe Boyd's book White Bicycles – Making Music in the 1960s he asserts the band's performance of "Revolution" one night at the UFO Club was the apotheosis of the 1960s UK underground. Tomorrow also jammed with Jimi Hendrix at the UFO Club. There was a long delay between their 1967 single releases and the eventual release of their self-titled album in February 1968, and the album would fail commercially.

Tomorrow singer Keith West became better known as a participant in Mark Wirtz's A Teenage Opera project that gave him the solo hit single "Excerpt from 'A Teenage Opera' (Grocer Jack)" in 1967. His solo success so eclipsed the group that promoters began billing them as "Tomorrow featuring Keith West" and even insisting that the band perform "Excerpt from 'A Teenage Opera'" during their shows. West considered this to be what ended Tomorrow, as it rubbed it in for the members that the band was not going anywhere.

Twink and Junior split off and formed The Aquarian Age, which recorded one single before disbanding. West and guitarist Steve Howe in turn tried forming a band with Ronnie Wood (no relation to Junior) on bass and Aynsley Dunbar on drums, but though they recorded a handful of tracks nothing came of it. When two of these tracks were released as a single, "On a Saturday" b/w "The Kid Was a Killer", they were credited to Keith West solo. Howe later joined progressive rock band Yes, whilst Twink joined the Pretty Things in order to complete their concept album, S.F. Sorrow, before forming the Pink Fairies. Junior sometimes played bass with Jeff Beck.

In 2021, the official biography of Keith West, Thinking About Tomorrow – Excerpts from the life of Keith West, was published.

== Members ==
- Keith West – vocals
- Steve Howe – guitars
- John "Junior" Wood – bass
- John "Twink" Adler – drums

== Discography ==
=== Albums ===
- Tomorrow (Parlophone [UK] / Sire [US], February 1968)
- 50 Minute Technicolor Dream (RPM 184, 1998)
- Permanent Dream (Cherry Red Records, 2023)

=== Singles ===
As The In Crowd:

- "That's How Strong My Love Is" / "Things She Says" (single, Parlophone R5276, April 1965) – UK No. 48
- "Stop, Wait a Minute" / "You're on Your Own" (single, Parlophone R5328, September 1965)
- "Why Must They Criticise" / "I Don't Mind" (single, Parlophone R5364, November 1965)

As Tomorrow:

- "My White Bicycle" / "Claramount Lake" (single, Parlophone R5597, May 1967)
- "Revolution" / "Three Jolly Little Dwarfs" (single, Parlophone R5627, September 1967) – UK No. 56 (Note: Chart position is from the official UK "Breakers List".)
