= Beat-Club =

German music television programme (1965-1972)

- Genre: Music
- Created by: Gerhard Augustin and Mike Leckebusch
- Presented by: Gerhard Augustin (1965); Eddie Vickers (1965–1966); Uschi Nerke; Dave Lee Travis (1966–1969); Dave Dee (1969–1970)
- Opening theme: Mood Mosaic: "A Touch of Velvet - A Sting of Brass"
- Composer: Mark Wirtz (theme)
- Country of origin: West Germany
- Original language: German
- No. of episodes: 83

Production
- Producers: Radio Bremen, WDR (1969–1972)
- Production locations: Bremen, West Germany (unless stated below); Tiles Club, London (episode 11); Hamburg, West Germany (episode 16); Marquee Club, London (episode 18); West Berlin, West Germany (episode 24)
- Camera setup: Studio Hamburg
- Running time: 30–60 minutes

Original release
- Network: ARD (Radio Bremen)
- Release: 25 September 1965 – 9 December 1972

Beat-Club is a West German music programme that ran from September 1965 to December 1972. It was broadcast from Bremen, West Germany on Erstes Deutsches Fernsehen, the national public television channel of the ARD, and produced by one of its members, Radio Bremen, later co-produced by WDR following the 38th episode.

== History ==
Beat-Club was co-created by Gerhard Augustin and Mike Leckebusch. The show premiered on 25 September 1965 with Augustin and Uschi Nerke hosting. German television personality Wilhelm Wieben opened the first show with a short speech. After eight episodes, Augustin stepped down from his hosting role and was replaced by British disc-jockey Dave Lee Travis.

The show immediately caused a sensation and achieved cult status in West Germany among the youth, while being detested by some older people. The show's earlier episodes featured live performances, and was set in front of a plain brick wall. It underwent a revamp in 1966, when a more professional look was adopted with large cards in the background displaying the names of the performers, who now mimed to their hit records (the standard practice on most music shows from the era) in front of the studio audience. (A companion series, Beat Beat Beat, continued to run live performances.) Around this time, a troupe of young women billed the "Go-Go-Girls," were introduced to dance to songs when their performers could not appear.

In early 1969, Travis was replaced by British singer Dave Dee. On 31 December 1969, Beat-Club switched to colour and again featured live performances, but without an audience. Dee departed in 1970, leaving Nerke as the lone host.

In the later years of its run, the series was known for incorporating psychedelic visual effects during many performances, many concentrating on images of the performers in the background. When the show switched to colour, the effects became much more vivid.

The Grateful Dead performed on the show on 21 April 1972, halfway through their European tour. The band played songs like "Truckin'". This is believed to be the last professionally filmed appearance of Ron "Pigpen" McKernan, who retired from the band shortly after the end of the tour, due to medical reasons (he died in March 1973). In 2014, the footage had its first theatrical screening in theatres across America.

== Acts on the show ==
In its seven-year run, before being replaced by Musikladen, the show featured artists such as the following:

- Alice Cooper
- Amon Düül II
- The Animals
- Arthur Brown
- Ashton, Gardner & Dyke
- Atomic Rooster
- Badfinger
- Barry St. John
- The Beach Boys
- Bee Gees
- Beggars Opera
- Black Sabbath
- Blue Cheer
- Can
- Canned Heat
- Captain Beefheart
- Caravan
- Cherry Wainer
- Chicago
- Chuck Berry
- Cream
- Dave Davies
- David Bowie
- Delaney, Bonnie & Friends
- Deep Purple
- The Doors
- The Easybeats
- Emerson, Lake & Palmer
- The Equals
- Eric Burdon and War
- Family
- Fanny
- Fleetwood Mac
- The Flower Pot Men
- Fotheringay
- Frank Zappa
- Free
- Frumpy
- Gene Pitney
- Golden Earring
- Grapefruit (band)
- Grateful Dead
- Guru Guru
- Harry Nilsson
- The Hollies
- Ike & Tina Turner
- Iron Butterfly
- James Gang
- Janis Joplin
- Jethro Tull
- Jimi Hendrix
- Joe Cocker
- Joy & The Hit Kids
- Julie Driscoll & Brian Auger and the Trinity
- King Crimson
- The Kinks
- Kraftwerk
- The Liverbirds
- Led Zeppelin
- Lucifer's Friend
- Lulu
- Manassas
- Manfred Mann
- The Moody Blues
- MC5
- Mountain
- The Move
- Osibisa
- Popol Vuh
- P. P. Arnold
- Rare Bird
- Redbone
- Richie Havens
- Robin Gibb
- The Rolling Stones
- Rory Gallagher
- Sandie Shaw
- Santana
- Scott McKenzie
- Sharon Tandy
- Small Faces
- Soft Machine
- Sonny & Cher
- Spirit
- Status Quo
- Steppenwolf
- Stone the Crows
- Ten Years After
- Third World War
- Three Dog Night
- Thunderclap Newman
- Tiny Tim
- T. Rex
- UFO
- Vanilla Fudge
- The Walker Brothers
- The Who
- Yes
- Zager and Evans

Performances from the show were seen on VH1 Classic, and reruns in several European countries. Several DVD collections of the show have also been released.

== Relaunch ==
Beat-Club is now broadcast on Sunday afternoons between 1 and 3 pm, as a weekly radio programme on Radio Bremen 1, and on a web channel offered by the radio station. The radio show is hosted by Nerke, who reprised her role as presenter for the series.

The 2008 Video on demand web portal launched for both Beat-Club and Musikladen was replaced by a YouTube channel in 2010.
