= Mark Wirtz =

French record producer (1943–2020)

- Wirtz pictured in Savannah, Georgia, 2007
- Born: Mark Philipp Wirtz; 3 September 1943; Strasbourg, France
- Died: 7 August 2020 (aged 76); Springfield, Dougherty, Georgia, United States
- Spouse: Amanda Wirtz
- Partner: Jeff Janning
- Website: www.markwirtz.com

Mark Philipp Wirtz (3 September 1943 – 7 August 2020) was a German French pop music record producer, composer, singer, musician, author, and comedian. Wirtz is best known for A Teenage Opera concept album, a project he devised while working under contract to EMI at Abbey Road Studios with Beatles engineer Geoff Emerick. The first single from the planned album, "Excerpt from A Teenage Opera" by Keith West, was a number 2 hit on the UK Singles Chart in September 1967 and encapsulates Wirtz's signature style, described by Mojo magazine as "Phil Spector scoring Camberwick Green". Another track produced and arranged by Wirtz, the 1966 single "A Touch of Velvet – A Sting of Brass" credited to The Mood-Mosaic featuring the Ladybirds, became well-known in Germany as the theme tune for the Radio Bremen television show Musikladen, and was used by some radio stations and DJs in the United Kingdom as an ident, notably Dave Lee Travis on Radio Caroline.

== Biography ==
=== Early life ===
Wirtz was born in Strasbourg, and raised in Cologne, Germany. He moved to England in 1962.

=== Early career (1960s) ===
Mark Wirtz began his music career while studying art at London's Fairfield College of Arts and Sciences. According to a former flatmate, "Three things already stood out in him at the age of seventeen: his prodigious talent as an artist – he could paint original work in the style of any of the grand masters; his natural ability as a musician – he could pick out any tune on the piano by ear; and his zany sense of humour – he idolized the comedian Jerry Lewis."

He was studying drama at the Royal Academy of Dramatic Art when his college rock band, The Beatcrackers, were signed to a recording contract in 1963 as Mark Rogers and the Marksmen by EMI producer Norman Newell. They recorded a single, "Bubble Pop". By 1965 Wirtz had started his first independent production company, and worked with Marlene Dietrich as well as releasing his own instrumentals under various pseudonyms. In 1966, he wrote and produced the single "A Touch of Velvet – A Sting of Brass", an orchestral production credited to The Mood-Mosaic with vocals by the Ladybirds, which became a popular theme tune on pirate radio stations. He also produced and directed the debut recording of jazz singer Belle Gonzalez in 1965.

In 1967, Wirtz accepted EMI veteran producer/A&R chief Norrie Paramor's offer to join EMI Records as in-house producer. Working at Abbey Road Studios alongside the Beatles and Pink Floyd, often with engineer Geoff Emerick, Wirtz wrote and produced landmark recordings by artists such as Keith West, Tomorrow, and Kippington Lodge. He reached global success with his production of "Excerpt from A Teenage Opera" (also known as "Grocer Jack"), recorded by Keith West. Though never completed or released as an entire work, the idea of a rock opera became influential.

Wirtz was married to singer Ross Hannaman for a period of time. Together, they wrote and recorded the song "Barefoot and Tiptoe" under the name The Sweetshop, erroneously believed to have been from A Teenage Opera. Wirtz and Hannaman divorced in 1969, at which time Wirtz teamed up with poetry writer Maria Feltham to record Wirtz's concept album, Philwit and Pegasus, for composer Les Reed's Chapter One label.

In 1969, his creative freedom restricted by drastic changes in A&R policy, Wirtz resigned his post at EMI Records to return to independent production. Associations with Larry Page's Penny Farthing label, Samantha Jones, and Kris Ife followed, during which Wirtz formed a co-writing partnership ("Learning 2 Live With Love", MWET/Spyderbaby (2005); "One Night Stand", MWET/Anthony Rivers (2005), and the Cooking For Cannibals soundtrack album (2007).

=== 1970s ===
In 1970, Wirtz moved to Los Angeles to accept an invitation by his fellow expatriate producer and friend Denny Cordell to work with him at Hollywood's Shelter Records. In 1973, Wirtz signed a writer/artist/producer contract with Capitol Records for whom he recorded two albums, Balloon and Hothouse Smiles. Both were released under the name "Marc Wirtz".

In 1975, dropped by Capitol for his refusal to tour or perform publicly, he signed with producer Tom Catalano and veteran publisher Dan Crewe's RCA-distributed TomCat label, a short-lived association because of the label folding only weeks after Wirtz's first single release, "We Could Have Laughed Forever". Having become a parent in the same year, Wirtz dropped his "loose cannon" career pursuits and, under the name of Marc Peters, became a freelance session arranger/conductor in partnership with several producers, including Kim Fowley and Jimmy Bowen. He subsequently created numerous pop, R&B and country songs that featured an array of artists as diverse as Helen Reddy, Leon Russell, Vicky Leandros, Kim Carnes, Dean Martin, and Anthony Newley.

In 1979, signed by Russ Regan to Interworld Music/CBS Records as writer and producer, Wirtz produced his third solo album, Lost Pets, sequentially joined by guitarists Richard Bennett and John Beland, keyboard players Alan Lindgren and Tom Hensley, drummers Billy Thomas and Denny Seiwell, and bassists David Hungate and Les Hurdle. However, the production was never finished due to Wirtz's decision to concentrate on his family, leading to a 20-year hiatus from the music business.

=== Hiatus from music ===
During those years, after savings had run out and royalties had dwindled, Wirtz took on a gamut of jobs, including telemarketer, waiter, maître d', bloodstock agent, interpreter, voice-over artist, seminar leader and eventually sales manager for a Geneva merger and acquisition firm.

While taking acting classes during off-times and in the pursuit of a new career as a novelist, Wirtz also realized a lifelong ambition to be a comedian by studying and performing at Hollywood's Groundlings Improv Theater, to eventually take his first steps onto the stages of Hollywood's comedy clubs, including The Comedy Store and The Improv.

In 1996, Wirtz moved to Savannah, Georgia, where he became an award-winning freelance magazine columnist/critic, writing about food and drama, while publishing his first novels, Sisyphus Rocks and Love Is Eggshaped, as well as selling paintings in a Savannah gallery.

=== Later years and death ===
In 2004, giving in to the plea from his daughter Nicole (by now resident in Spain) to produce her rock-band-leader boyfriend's debut album, Wirtz flew to Barcelona and returned to the studio for the first time in many years to produce Les Philippes' Philharmonic Philanthropy. Before year's end, the band's album was No. 1 in the independent label charts. Wirtz continued his rebounded studio activities by subsequently producing his own Mark Wirtz Eartheatre solo album Love Is Eggshaped, Spyderbaby UK's Glassblower CD, and Anthony Rivers' Marked Confidential.

In January 2006, Wirtz found a path back into comedy by collaborating with Jacksonville, Florida's "Jax Comics" group of working comedians, initially working out at the Comedy Zone, then moving on by touring the southeast's comedy club s in the development of his stand-up comedy act. In 2010, Wirtz produced an all-new solo studio album, Lost Pets 2, scheduled for international release by PoppyDisc Records in October 2010.

Wirtz died on the morning of 7 August 2020 from Pick's disease.
