= The Thirteenth Dream =

Studio album by Spirit
- Released: June 1984
- Recorded: 1982
- Length: 39:59
- Label: Mercury
- Producer: David DeVore

Spirit chronology
...Potato Land (1981)	The Thirteenth Dream (1984)	Rapture in the Chambers (1989)

Professional ratings
Review scores
Source	Rating
Allmusic	2.5/5 stars

The Thirteenth Dream was the second (and final) "reunion" album from Spirit, and their eleventh album overall. It features re-recordings of seven of their best-loved tracks, along with three new songs. The most noteworthy things that can be said about the album are in regard to the excellent fidelity of the album, as it was originally recorded by an audiophile label and is an early digital recording (dating from December 1982), and that it was the first Spirit album to be released on CD, as it appeared in that format from Mercury Records in West Germany in 1984 (consequently, it is also one of the best sounding early CD releases from a rock band, probably due to the recording technology that was implemented).

As previously mentioned, this album was originally released on CD in 1984. However, the original CD is incredibly rare. It was later reissued in 2004 by Beat Goes On in a two-fer with Future Games.

A version of "Elijah" (originally released on Spirit) was recorded during these sessions and issued as the B-side of a maxi single. It has not appeared on any of the CD releases, nor on the LP.

The album was issued as Spirit of '84 by Mercury in the United States, with a different cover photo.

Artwork for the U.S. version of the album

== Track listing ==
All songs written by Jay Ferguson except noted.

No.	Title	Writer(s)	Original album	Length
1.	"Black Satin Nights"		new song	3:12
2.	"Mr Skin"	Ferguson, California, Andes, Cassidy, Locke	Twelve Dreams of Dr. Sardonicus	3:39
3.	"Mechanical World"	Andes, Ferguson	Spirit	5:50
4.	"Pick It Up"		new song	3:00
5.	"All Over The World"	California, Crawford, Henke	new song	3:57
6.	"1984"	California	1969 single	3:59
7.	"Uncle Jack"		Spirit	2:59
8.	"Nature's Way"	California	Twelve Dreams of Dr. Sardonicus	2:44
9.	"Fresh Garbage"		Spirit	3:05
10.	"I Got a Line on You"	California	The Family That Plays Together	7:34

== Personnel ==
=== Spirit ===
- Randy California - guitar, vocals
- Mark Andes - bass, vocals
- Ed Cassidy - percussion, drums
- Jay Ferguson - guitar, vocals
- John Locke - keyboards

=== Additional musicians ===
- Jeff "Skunk" Baxter - guitar
- Bob Welch - guitar, vocals
- Joe Lala - percussion
- Matt Andes - guitar, vocals
- Howard Leese - guitar
- Gary Myrick - guitar
- Neal Doughty - keyboards
- Jerry Jumonville - saxophone
- Curly Smith - percussion, drums, vocals
- Keith Knudsen - percussion, drums
- Bruce Gary - percussion, vocals
- Alan Gratzer - percussion, vocals
- Bobby LaKind - percussion

=== Production ===
- David DeVore - producer
- Gary W. Gratzer - executive producer
- Thomas L. Chavey - executive producer
- Michael Verdick - mixing
- Mike Nocito - mixing
- Allen Sides - engineer
- Stan Katayama - assistant engineer
- Mark Richardson - assistant engineer
- Mark Ettel - assistant engineer
- Art Ache - art direction, illustrations
- Patti Heid - art direction, illustrations
