= Al Staehely =

American musical artist and lawyer (born 1945)

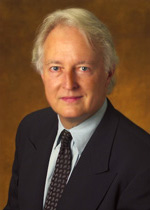
- Staehely in 1999

Background information
- Born: Al Staehely Jr. December 27, 1945 (age 80); Austin, Texas, U.S.
- Genres: Rock
- Occupations: Musician; songwriter; entertainment lawyer
- Instruments: Guitar; bass guitar; vocals
- Years active: 1970s
- Labels: Polydor; Epic
- Website: alstaehely.com

Al Staehely is an American singer/songwriter from the 1970s. He was featured in Spirit, The Staehely Brothers, The Nick Gravenites / John Cipollina Band and recorded with labels such as Epic and Polydor.

He is now an entertainment lawyer based in Houston, Texas. He has specialized in legal matters pertaining to the music and film industries since 1979.

== Music career ==
After receiving his undergraduate degree from the University of Texas at Austin in 1967 and J.D. from the University of Texas School of Law in 1970, Staehely was admitted to the Texas bar before moving to Los Angeles. In 1971, he replaced John Arliss (who briefly succeeded Mark Andes) as bassist in the already-established Spirit, touring with drummer Ed Cassidy and keyboardist John Locke as a trio while guitarist Randy California convalesced from a horse accident. Shortly thereafter, California departed the group and was replaced by Staehley's brother, John Christian Staehely. Under the aegis of producer David Briggs (best known for his lifelong collaboration with Neil Young), the new quartet recorded Feedback (1972), which showcased the bassist as the band's lead vocalist and principal songwriter.

Two years later, he wrote ten songs for a Staehely Brothers album (Sta-Hay-Lee) also released on Epic Records. Later, Polydor released a solo album by Al Staehely. His songs have been recorded by Keith Moon, Bobbie Gentry, Patti Dahlstrom, Nick Gravenites, John Cipollina, Marty Balin, Peter Cox and Hodges, James & Smith.

In an interview, Staley said, "Law didn't lead me to music. Music delivered me to law. Like so many others, I played in bands while in high school (Austin, Texas), in university (The University of Texas) and in law school (The University of Texas School of Law). Unlike most others, I didn't practice law for almost ten years after graduating. I joined the group Spirit, wrote songs, recorded for Epic records and toured the world."

== Entertainment lawyer ==
His clients include musicians, record labels, music publishing companies, and distribution companies. He handles various matters related to recording, publishing, sub-publishing, and licensing both domestically and internationally.

Staehely has represented film production companies, optioned life-story rights, and cleared music rights for films including the Academy Award-nominated documentary For All Mankind. He also represents clients with respect to litigation in all matters related to the entertainment business, including copyright and trademark issues.

In addition to his practice, Staehely has taught music publishing and music business law at both the Art Institute of Houston and St. Thomas University, also in Houston. He has also served as adjunct professor at the University of Houston Law Center, teaching entertainment law.

Staehely is also a member of The National Academy of Recording Arts and Sciences, the International Association of Entertainment Lawyers, and the entertainment and sports law section of the Texas Bar and the American Bar Association.

== Discography ==
- Cadillac Cowboys – Al Staehely & The Explosives, 2013, SteadyBoy Records
- Rockpalast: West Coast Legends, Vol. 1 – John Cipollina/Nick Gravenites Band, 2009, Fresh Fruit
- Stahaley's Comet – Al Staehely, 1982, Polydor (originally released in Europe; re-released in the U.S. by SteadyBoy Records under the name "Al Staehely & 10K Hrs.")
- Monkey Medicine – Nick Gravenites-John Cipollina Band, 1982, Big Beat Records
- Sta.Hay.Lee – The Staehely Brothers, 1973, Epic Records
- Feedback – Spirit, 1972, Epic Records

== Songs ==
- "Your Man In Rio", 2016, Artist - Al Staehely, Single
- "Heart of Texas (The Texas Christmas Song)", 2013, Artist – Al Staehely featuring Mickey Raphael, Single
- "Bailout Blues", 2013, Artist – Al Staehely & The Explosives, Album – Cadillac Cowboys
- "Feel The Heat", 2013, Artist – Peter Cox, Album – Riding the Blinds
- "Longshot", 1982, Artist – Al Staehely, Album – Stahaley's Comets
- "The Bluer Side of Town", 1982, Artist – Al Staehely, Album – Stahaley's Comet
- "Ice on Fire", 1982, Artist – Al Staehely, Album – Stahaley's Comet
- "Coastin'", 1982, Artist – Al Staehely, Album – Stahaley's Comet
- "Mr. X-Terminator", 1982, Artist – Al Staehely, Album – Stahaley's Comet
- "Lovin' Tuff", 1982, Artist – Al Staehely, Album – Stahaley's Comet
- "Low Threshold for Pleasure", 1982, Artist – Al Staehely, Album – Stahaley's Comet
- "Hot Rods and Cool Women", 1982, Artist – The Nick Gravenites, John Cipollina Band, Album – Monkey Medicine
- "Signs of Life", 1982, Artist – The Nick Gravenites John Cipollina Band, Album – Monkey Medicine
- "Trust Me", 1982, Artist – The Nick Gravenites John Cipollina Band, Album – Monkey Medicine
- "Mercy of the Moon", 1991, Artist – Marty Balin, Album – Better Generation
- "Louisiana", 1975, Artist – Patti Dahlstrom, Album – Your Place or Mine
- "He Did Me Wrong, But He Did It Right", 1975, Artist – Patti Dahlstrom, Album – Your Place or Mine
- "Without Love", 1976, Artist – Patti Dahlstrom, Album – Livin' It Thru
- "Lookin' for Love", 1976, Artist – Patti Dahlstrom, Album – Livin' It Thru
- "Crazy Like a Fox", 1975, Artist – Keith Moon, Album – Two Sides of the Moon
- "Future Shock", 1973, Artist – The Staehely Bros., Album – Sta.Hay.Lee
- "Woman in Love", 1973, Artist – The Staehely Bros., Album – Sta.Hay.Lee
- "Woe is Me", 1973, Artist – The Staehely Bros., Album – Sta.Hay.Lee
- "Loco Motive", 1973, Artist – The Staehely Bros., Album – Sta.Hay.Lee
- "Soldiers in the Night", 1973, Artist – The Staehely Bros., Album – Sta.Hay.Lee
- "Captain Zombie Meets Unfellini", 1973, Artist – The Staehely Bros., Album – Sta.Hay.Lee
- "Rockin' in the Bush", 1973, Artist – The Staehely Bros., Album – Sta.Hay.Lee
- "You Won't Be Sorry", 1973, Artist – The Staehely Bros., Album – Sta.Hay.Lee
- "Chelsea Girls", 1971, Artist – Spirit, Album – Feedback
- "Cadillac Cowboys", 1971, Artist – Spirit, Album – Feedback
- "Ripe and Ready", 1971, Artist – Spirit, Album – Feedback
- "Earth Shaker", 1971, Artist – Spirit, Album – Feedback
- "Mellow Morning", 1971, Artist – Spirit, Album – Feedback
- "Right on Time", 1971, Artist – Spirit, Album – Feedback
- "Witch", 1971, Artist – Spirit, Album – Feedback
- "New York City", 1971, Artist – Spirit, Album – Feedback
