= Live at La Paloma =

Live album by Spirit
- Released: 1995
- Recorded: Sep 16, 1977 – Oct 16, 1993
- Label: C.R.E.W.
- Producer: Randy California

Spirit chronology
Chronicles, 1967–1992 (1991)	Live at La Paloma (1995)	California Blues (1996)

Professional ratings
Review scores
Source	Rating
Allmusic	3/5 stars

Live at La Paloma is a live album by the hard rock band Spirit. Eleven of the 16 tracks were recorded on October 16, 1993 at the La Paloma Theater in Encinitas, California.

== Track listing ==
All songs written by Randy California except noted.

No.	Title	Writer(s)	Length
1.	"Life Has Just Begun"		2:55
2.	"Sadana"	California, Cassidy, Monahan	3:05
3.	"Mr Skin"	Jay Ferguson	3:49
4.	"Hey Joe"	Billy Roberts	4:26
5.	"I Got a Line on You"		3:11
6.	"Prelude-Nothin To Hide"		3:34
7.	"Like a Rolling Stone"	Bob Dylan	5:56
8.	"Going Back To Jones"		3:54
9.	"Living In This World"		3:00
10.	"Magic Wand"		4:28
11.	"Give A Life, Take A Life"		2:35
12.	"La Paloma Jam-Electro Jam"	California, Cassidy, Monahan	4:08
13.	"1984"		4:20
14.	"Jamaica Jam"		2:16
15.	"Super La Paloma Jam"	California, Cassidy, Monahan	11:32
16.	"Nature's Way"		3:09

== Personnel ==
=== Spirit ===
- Randy California - Guitar, Vocals
- Ed Cassidy - Drums, Vocals
- Larry Knight - Bass
- Steve Loria - Bass, Digital Editing
- Scott Monahan - Bass, Keyboards, Vocals, Key Bass

Guest Appearance:

- John Locke - Piano
