= Model Shop (album) =

Soundtrack album by Spirit
- Released: Feb 8, 2005
- Recorded: 1968
- Genre: Rock
- Length: 40:57
- Label: Sundazed Music
- Producer: Lou Adler

Spirit chronology
The Family That Plays Together (1968)	Model Shop (2005)	Clear (1969)

Professional ratings
Review scores
Source	Rating
Allmusic	2.5/5 stars

Model Shop is a 2005 album by the Los Angeles group, Spirit, which collects the material they recorded in 1968, for the soundtrack to Jacques Demy's film Model Shop. Chronologically, the album's material falls in between their second and third albums, The Family That Plays Together (1968) and Clear (1969) respectively.

For his film, director Jacques Demy wanted a band that captured the vibe of Los Angeles as he saw it. After hearing Spirit perform in an L.A. club, he decided that they would be the perfect group for his film's soundtrack. However, the film itself was considered a failure and no soundtrack album was released at the time. Most of the material remained unreleased until 2005, following the discovery of a master tape of the original mono mixes.

Model Shop differs from other Spirit albums of the era, in that most of the songs were written collaboratively. Also, with the exception of "Now or Anywhere" and "Green Gorilla", the pieces are exclusively instrumental and highlight the Jazz leanings of the band.

There are noticeable musical overlaps between the pieces on the soundtrack and Spirit's second and third albums. Work on Model Shop had begun in the middle of recording sessions for The Family That Plays Together, and two outtakes from that album, "Fog" and "Now or Anywhere", would appear in different form on the soundtrack. Later, when Spirit began to gather material for Clear, the band drew from much of the material on the unreleased soundtrack. For example, "Model Shop II" became the title song to Clear and "Song for Lola" was used as part of "Ice".

== See also ==
- Model Shop (film)

== Notes ==
Ever since 1991's Time Circle, 1968–1972 compilation album, bits and pieces from the soundtrack have been appearing on Spirit re-releases and later compilations. This official release marks the first time that all of the Model Shop recordings have been taken from the actual monophonic master mix of the film soundtrack. Previously issued recordings have often been alternate takes or were stereo mixes with increased production.

== Track listing ==
All songs by Ferguson, Locke, California, Andes, and Cassidy, except as indicated.

1. "The Moving Van" – 1:56
2. "Mellow Fellow" (instrumental) (Cassidy, Locke) – 2:50
3. "Now Or Anywhere" – 4:39
4. "Fog" (instrumental) – 2:24
5. "Green Gorilla" – 2:13
6. "Model Shop I" – 2:01
7. "Model Shop II (Clear)" (instrumental) – 4:08
8. "The Rehearsal Theme" (instrumental) – 1:11
9. "Song For Lola" — 5:47
10. "Eventide" (instrumental) (Locke) – 3:36
11. "Coral" (instrumental) (Locke) – 4:22
12. "Aren't You Glad" (Ferguson) – 5:25
  - demo version of a song never intended for the soundtrack; the final mix appeared on The Family That Plays Together
- Tracks 1–11 were on the soundtrack.
- Tracks 2, 4–6, 10–12, are previously unissued original mixes.

== Personnel ==
=== Spirit ===
- Randy California – guitar
- Mark Andes – bass
- Ed Cassidy – drums
- Jay Ferguson – vocals, percussion
- John Locke – keyboards

=== Technical ===
- Lou Adler – producer
- Stephanie Kennedy – production coordination
- Bob Irwin – mastering
- Tim Livingston – project manager
- Jayme Pieruzzi – project manager
- Mick Skidmore – liner notes
- Jeff Smith – design
