= Time Circle, 1968–1972 =

Greatest hits album by Spirit
- Released: Jul 23, 1991
- Recorded: 1968–72
- Genre: Rock
- Label: Epic/Legacy
- Producer: Lou Adler (disc 1; disc 2, tracks 1–8); Spirit (disc 2, tracks 9–10, 20); David Briggs (disc 2, tracks 11–19)

Spirit chronology
Tent of Miracles (1990)	Time Circle, 1968–1972 (1991)	Chronicles, 1967–1992 (1991)

Professional ratings
Review scores
Source	Rating
Allmusic	4.5/5 stars

Time Circle is a compilation album by Spirit, issued in 1991.

This set draws heavily from the four albums released by the original line-up on Ode Records and Epic Records. It also includes some outtakes and versions of songs from then unreleased soundtrack work (Model Shop). At the time that this set was released, Twelve Dreams of Dr. Sardonicus was the only studio album by the original group still in print.

Several of the outtakes were later included on the 1996 reissues of the first four albums. The remixes of the tracks on The Family That Plays Together (necessitated because the master mix was lost shortly after the album's release) are different from the 1996 re-release.

== Tracks listing ==
=== Disc One ===
No.	Title	Length
1.	"Fresh Garbage"
2.	"Uncle Jack"
3.	"Mechanical World"
4.	"Taurus"
5.	"Girl In Your Eye"
6.	"Straight Arrow"
7.	"Topanga Windows"
8.	"Grammophone Man"
9.	"The Great Canyon Fire In General"
10.	"I Got a Line on You"
11.	"It Shall Be"
12.	"Poor Richard"
13.	"Silky Sam"
14.	"Sherozode"
15.	"All The Same"
16.	"Dream Within A Dream"
17.	"Aren't You Glad"
18.	"Eventide"
19.	"Model Shop Theme (The Moving Van)"
20.	"Green Gorilla"
21.	"Rehearsal Theme"

- Tracks 1–9 from Spirit
- Tracks 10–13, 15–17 from The Family That Plays Together
- Track 14 is an outtake from The Family That Plays Together
- Tracks 18–21 from sessions for the Model Shop soundtrack
- Tracks 10–20 are new remixes

=== Disc Two ===
No.	Title	Length
1.	"Fog"
2.	"Now Or Anywhere"
3.	"Dark Eyed Woman"
4.	"So Little Time To Fly"
5.	"Ground Hog"
6.	"Ice"
7.	"I'm Truckin'"
8.	"New Dope In Town"
9.	"1984"
10.	"Sweet Stella Baby"
11.	"Prelude - Nothin' To Hide"
12.	"Nature's Way"
13.	"Animal Zoo"
14.	"Love Has Found A Way"
15.	"Why Can't I Be Free"
16.	"Mr. Skin"
17.	"When I Touch You"
18.	"Street Worm"
19.	"Morning Will Come"
20.	"Turn To The Right"

- Tracks 1–2 are outtakes from The Family That Plays Together
- Tracks 3–8 from Clear
- Tracks 9–10 are from single 45 rpm only release, 1969
- Tracks 11–19 from Twelve Dreams of Dr. Sardonicus
- Track 20 from the Potato Land sessions
