= Kapt. Kopter and the (Fabulous) Twirly Birds =

Studio album by Randy California
- Released: September 1972
- Recorded: 1972
- Studios: Larrabee, Sunwest and Sound City Studios, Los Angeles, California
- Length: 40:26
- Label: Epic
- Producers: Kapt. Kopter (Robin Wolfe, Randy California)

Randy California chronology
Kapt. Kopter and the (Fabulous) Twirly Birds (1972)	Euro-American (1982)

Kapt. Kopter and the (Fabulous) Twirly Birds is a 1972 studio album by Randy California.

== Background ==
This album was recorded and released following Randy California's departure from Spirit. Originally the band was named "Helicopter" and was billed as that at The Whisky a GoGo for a show. Randy California met DeeDee the Whisky's secretary opening day who laughed at the band's name. He asked her what she would call them and her reply was "Something memorable like 'Captain Copter & the Whirlybirds'!" Randy loved it and immediately changed the band's name. DeeDee is credited on the album for naming the band.

Spirit's fourth LP, Twelve Dreams of Dr. Sardonicus, reached the charts but took an inordinate amount of time to receive attention (the album would eventually be certified gold by the RIAA in 1976). As a result, Jay Ferguson and Mark Andes departed Spirit to form Jo Jo Gunne with Andes' brother Matt (whose slide guitar work had previously appeared in "Prelude: Nothin' to Hide" on the Sardonicus album) and drummer Curly Smith.

Following the departure of Jay Ferguson and Mark Andes in early 1971, Spirit recruited John Arliss (and later John Fine) on bass and resumed playing live shows in March 1971. Randy California, however, was also growing disenchanted in Spirit and left the band in July 1971, along with bassist John Fine. They were replaced by brothers Al and John Staehely (on bass and guitar, respectively), and Spirit went on to record Feedback without Randy.

Randy spent much of his time afterwards in jam sessions with various musicians in Topanga Canyon clubs, particularly a club known as The Corral. Some of the musicians who appeared in these jam sessions, along with Noel Redding (under the pseudonym 'Clit McTorius'), Leslie Sampson (the drummer from Noel's band Road, under the pseudonym 'Henry Manchovitz') and Ed Cassidy (as 'Cass Strange'), would end up working with Randy when he started recording solo material in 1972. The resulting album featured numerous covers of the works of contemporary acts such as the Beatles and James Brown, with less emphasis upon original material by Randy. The album was also heavily influenced by the death of Jimi Hendrix in 1970, who had been friends with Randy since they played together in Jimmy James and the Blue Flames.

== Promotion and reception ==
Professional ratings
Review scores
Source	Rating
AllMusic	3/5 stars
Christgau's Record Guide	B
Classic Rock	7/10 stars
The Rolling Stone Album Guide	4/5 stars

On November 7, 1972, shortly after the album's release, Epic released a promotional-only single to radio stations. Reflecting the album's division between covers and original material, the single featured a cover of Rufus Thomas' "Walkin' the Dog" on one side and an original by Randy entitled "Live for the Day" on the opposite side (neither song was released on the original album). Neither the album or the single were commercially successful.

Randy convened a touring band during the same period under the Kapt. Kopter and the (Fabulous) Twirly Birds moniker. The group, which featured Ed Cassidy on drums and Larry "Fuzzy" Knight on bass, supported the album by playing shows around the Los Angeles area, including a few performances for the radio station KPFK. Several months after the album's release, this group would tour Europe as Spirit under pressure from booking agents who wanted to capitalize on Spirit's name and were not interested in Randy's solo work.

Critical opinions of the album are mixed. William Ruhlmann, reviewing the album for AllMusic, wrote that the cover songs "became almost unrecognizable frames for California's improvisations. At least the covers were actual songs, which was more than you could say for the originals", before concluding that "Kapt. Kopter ended up proving that California was not ready to be promoted from a group guitarist who sang and wrote occasionally." However, Robert Christgau stated that, while he did not have a passion for "sheer dense weirdness", the album's "tunefully distorted guitar (and vocal) showcase will grow on you if you give it half a chance". Gavin Martin of Classic Rock in his positive review remarks how the album reflects the strong spiritual and musical connection with Jimi Hendrix, although California shows here an "individual, densely layered" sensibility which puts him "several light years ahead of the pack."

Despite the album's critical reception, there has been enough continuing interest in the album to warrant numerous LP and CD reissues. The initial CD release of this album by Edsel Records contained both tracks from the promotional single that Epic released in 1972. The later CD reissues by Sony Music and Acadia also feature these tracks along with an additional instrumental track entitled "Rebel".

== Track listing ==
Side one
No.	Title	Writer(s)	Length
1.	"Downer"	Randy California	5:36
2.	"Devil"	California	4:13
3.	"I Don't Want Nobody"	James Brown	4:25
4.	"Day Tripper"	John Lennon, Paul McCartney	3:00
5.	"Mother and Child Reunion"	Paul Simon	2:51

Side two
No.	Title	Writer(s)	Length
6.	"Things Yet to Come"	Victor Keith Phillips, Lenny Lee Goldsmith	8:12
7.	"Rain"	Lennon, McCartney	8:38
8.	"Rainbow"	California	3:31

CD Reissue bonus tracks
No.	Title	Writer(s)	Length
9.	"Walkin' the Dog"	Rufus Thomas	3:01
10.	"Live for the Day"	California	3:23
11.	"Rebel"	California	4:21

== Personnel ==
- Randy California – vocals, guitar, waterbass on "Rainbow", producer
- Charlie Bundy – bass
- Noel Redding (credited as 'Clit McTorius') - bass on tracks 1, 6, 7
- Larry "Fuzzy" Knight – bass on track 5
- Tim McGovern - drums
- Leslie Sampson (credited as 'Henry Manchovitz') - drums on tracks 1, 6, 7
- Ed Cassidy (credited as 'Cass Strange') - drums on tracks 5 and 8
- Janet Wolfe, Robin Wolfe - background vocals
- Roger Dollarhide – engineer
