= Feedback (Spirit album) =

Studio album by Spirit
- Released: March 1972
- Recorded: November 1971
- Genre: Rock
- Length: 38:31
- Label: Epic
- Producer: David Briggs

Spirit chronology
Twelve Dreams of Dr. Sardonicus (1970)	Feedback (1972)	Spirit of '76 (1975)

Professional ratings
Review scores
Source	Rating
Allmusic	link
Christgau's Record Guide	B−
Rolling Stone	link

Feedback is the fifth album by the rock band Spirit. Released in 1972, it was the first Spirit album without original members Jay Ferguson and Mark Andes, and it was also the only Spirit album that did not feature Randy California performing on it, as California had left the group to pursue a solo career (Kapt. Kopter and the (Fabulous) Twirly Birds).

Feedback reached the same chart position on the U.S. Billboard album charts as its predecessor, Twelve Dreams of Dr. Sardonicus.

== Description ==
Feedback was the only Spirit album to feature John and Al Staehely as band members. Musically it was a different turn for the band, in favor of a country influenced hard rock style and lyrics mostly dealing with conventional male-female love topics, with only the tracks "Darkness" and the instrumentals "Puesta Del Scam" and "Trancas Fog-Out" recalling Spirit's earlier psychedelic rock. Although the album was not widely heard in later years, it finally surfaced on compact disc and received some extremely satisfying notices. The Feedback tour saw the remaining original members (Locke and Cassidy) leave the band during the tour, and John and Al Staehely regrouped the band under a new name, Sta-Hay-Lee, recording another album self-titled under the Sta-Hay-Lee name in 1973. John Staehely would later join Jay Ferguson's band Jo Jo Gunne.

Al Staehely, already a lawyer at the time, went on to become a full-time entertainment lawyer.

== Track listing ==
All songs written by Al Staehely except noted.

No.	Title	Writer(s)	Length
1.	"Chelsea Girls"		3:38
2.	"Cadillac Cowboys"		3:41
3.	"Puesta Del Scam (instrumental)"	Locke	2:10
4.	"Ripe and Ready"		3:53
5.	"Darkness"	Locke	4:59
6.	"Earth Shaker"		4:02
7.	"Mellow Morning"	Andes, A. Staehely	2:30
8.	"Right on Time"		2:50
9.	"Trancas Fog-Out (instrumental)"	Locke	2:46
10.	"Witch"		5:25
11.	"New York City †"

- † - CD bonus track

== Personnel ==
=== Spirit ===
- John Christian Staehely [credited as Chris Staehely] – guitar, backing vocals
- John Locke – keyboards
- Al Staehely – bass, lead vocals
- Ed Cassidy – drums

=== Production ===
- David Briggs – producer
- David Brown – engineer

== Charts ==
Chart (1972)	Peak position
US Billboard 200	63
