= Information (disambiguation) =

Information or info is the resolution of uncertainty, or a collection of related data or knowledge about a topic.

Information may also refer to:

- Information sign, a board or placard giving local information, or pointer to a tourist information source
- Information technology, the means of processing, storage, or transmission of data
- Information theory, the mathematical theory of information and communication
- Information (formal criminal charge), a formal criminal charge made by a prosecutor without a grand-jury indictment

== Books ==
- Information: The New Language of Science, a 2003 book by Hans Christian von Baeyer
- The Information (novel), by Martin Amis (1995)
- The Information: A History, a Theory, a Flood, a 2011 book by James Gleick

== Periodicals ==
- Dagbladet Information, a Danish newspaper
- The Information (website), a subscription-based digital media company

== Music ==
=== Albums ===
- Information (Berlin album), 1980
- Information (Dave Edmunds album), 1983
- The Information (Beck album), 2006
- Information, a 1997 album by Classified
- Information, a 1995 album by Toenut
- Information, an EP by Eliot Sumner

=== Songs ===
- "Information" (Dredg song), 2009
- "Information", by Gwen Stefani, an unreleased song
- "Information", by Spirit, from the album The Adventures of Kaptain Kopter & Commander Cassidy in Potato Land

== Related disambiguation articles ==
- Info (disambiguation)
- Inform (disambiguation)
- Information source (disambiguation)

== See also ==
- Data, or data used in computing
- Directory assistance, a phone service used to find out a specific telephone number and/or address of a residence, business, or government entity
- Fisher information, in statistics
- Help desk, an information service point
- In Formation, a 1982 album by Kronos Quartet
- In Formation (magazine), an American magazine about the social impact of technology
- Information wants to be free, an expression that means either that all people should be able to access information freely, or that information (formulated as an actor) naturally strives to become as freely available among people as possible
- Point of information (competitive debate)
- Philosophy of information
