= Rapture in the Chambers =

Studio album by Spirit
- Released: 1989
- Length: 38:44
- Label: I.R.S.
- Producer: Randy California

Spirit chronology
The Thirteenth Dream (1984)	Rapture in the Chambers (1989)	Tent of Miracles (1990)

Professional ratings
Review scores
Source	Rating
AllMusic	3.5/5 stars

Rapture in the Chambers is the 12th album by Spirit. It was their first "proper" album since their 1984 album Spirit of 84, which had featured the entire original line-up. Their albums since that time had mostly consisted of archival releases. It was also their final album for an established label, I.R.S. Records.

The primary line-up for this album was Randy California, Ed Cassidy, and John Locke. Mark Andes also appeared on two tracks, and Randy's sister Janet provided harmony vocals on Hard Love and She-Ra: Princess of Power.

== Track listing ==
All songs written by Randy California except noted.

No.	Title	Writer(s)	Length
1.	"Hard Love"	Andes, California	3:18
2.	"Love Tonight"		2:45
3.	"Thinking Of"		4:10
4.	"Rapture in the Chambers"		3:15
5.	"Mojo Man"		2:29
6.	"Contact"	California, Locke	2:42
7.	"The Prisoner"		4:16
8.	"One Track Mind"		3:22
9.	"Enchanted Forest"		3:28
10.	"Human Sexuality"		2:56
11.	"She-Ra: Princess of Power"	California, Cassidy, Locke	4:35
12.	"End Suite"	California, Cassidy	1:28

== Personnel ==
=== Spirit ===
- Randy California – guitars, lead vocals, bass (2–8, 10–12)
- John Locke – keyboards, sound effects
- Ed Cassidy – drums (all but 1), percussion

Additional personnel

- Janet Wolfe – backing vocals
- Mark Andes – bass (1, 9)
- Curly Smith – drums (1)

=== Production ===
- Mike Nile – engineer
- Scott Campbell – engineer
- Donald Krieger – art direction, design
- Rocky Schenck – photography
