= The Best of Spirit =

Greatest hits album by Spirit
- Released: 1973
- Genre: Rock
- Length: 36:45
- Label: Epic
- Producer: David Briggs (tracks A3, A4, B2, B4, B6); Lou Adler (tracks A2, A5, B1, B3, B5); Spirit (track A1)

Spirit chronology
Golden Spirit (1972)	The Best of Spirit (1973)	Spirit of '76 (1975)

The Best of Spirit is a 1973 Epic Records compilation by the American rock band Spirit.

== Reception ==
Professional ratings
Review scores
Source	Rating
AllMusic	4.5/5 stars
The Encyclopedia of Popular Music	3/5 stars
MusicHound Rock	4/5 stars
Tom Hull	C+
Robert Christgau	B+

Billboard magazine concluded it was a "good introduction for those unfamiliar with the group and a fine anthology for their fans." Cashbox magazine commented that "this collection of "Greatest Hits" has the entire era wrapped up into one solid album of tightly performed rock and roll." Record World called it a "marvelous 'Best of' package."

== Track listing ==
Tracks A1. A3, B1, B2 and B4 written by Randy California, all other tracks written or co-written by Jay Ferguson, track B5 co-written by Randy and Jay Ferguson, track A2 co-written by Jay Ferguson and Mark Andes,

Side one

1. "1984" – 3:37
2. "Mechanical World" – 5:18
3. "Nature's Way" – 2:29
4. "Animal Zoo" – 3:17
5. "Fresh Garbage" – 3:12

Side two

1. "I Got a Line on You" – 2:39
2. "Prelude/Nothin' to Hide" – 3:41
3. "Uncle Jack" – 2:45
4. "Morning Will Come" – 2:52
5. "Dark Eyed Woman" – 3:08
6. "Mr. Skin" – 3:51

== Chart ==
Chart performance for The Best of Spirit
Chart (1973)	Peak position
US Billboard 200	119
