= California Blues =

Studio album by Spirit
- Released: December 3, 1996
- Length: 44:43
- Label: Werc Crew
- Producer: Randy California

Spirit chronology
Live at la Paloma (1995)	California Blues (1996)	Live from the Time Coast (2004)

Professional ratings
Review scores
Source	Rating
Allmusic	3.5/5 stars

California Blues is the 14th and final studio album of the band Spirit, due to the death of guitarist/singer/songwriter Randy California one month after its release.

== Track listing ==
All songs written by Randy California except noted.

No.	Title	Writer(s)	Length
1.	"California Blues"		3:48
2.	"Look Over Yonder"	Jimi Hendrix	2:35
3.	"The River"		4:22
4.	"Call On Me"		2:58
5.	"Crossroads"	Robert Johnson	5:46
6.	"Song for Clyde"		5:40
7.	"Pawn Shop Blues"	Brownie McGhee, Sonny Terry	2:48
8.	"Sugar Mama"	Chester Arthur Burnett	3:18
9.	"Red House [live]"	Hendrix	6:12
10.	"Gimme Some Lovin'"	Davis, Winwood, Winwood	3:36
11.	"We Believe"		3:40
12.	"One World/Like a Dog/Poem for John Lennon/Shoes Back On/Tell – Everyone [live]"		22:46

== Personnel ==
=== Spirit ===
- Randy California - guitar, vocals
- Ed Cassidy - drums, vocals
- Matt Andes - slide guitar
- Steve Loria - bass
- Rachel Andes - vocals

=== Guests ===
- Robbie Krieger - guitar
- John Locke - piano
- Spencer Davis - guitar, vocals
- Bob Nichols - drums (track 3) "The River"
- Denise (Gula) Schriedel - Keyboards/Strings (Track 4) "Call on Me"
