= Spirit (Spirit album) =

Studio album by Spirit
- Released: January 22, 1968
- Recorded: August 31–November 17, 1967
- Genres: Psychedelic; rock; jazz; blues; folk rock; psychedelic pop
- Length: 41:55
- Label: Ode
- Producer: Lou Adler

Spirit chronology
Spirit (1968)	The Family That Plays Together (1968)

Singles from Spirit
- 1. "Mechanical World" Released: 1968

Professional ratings
Review scores
Source	Rating
AllMusic	4.5/5 stars
The Encyclopedia of Popular Music	4/5 stars
Rolling Stone	(favorable)

Spirit is the debut studio album by American rock band Spirit, released on January 22, 1968 by Ode Records. The album was commercially successful, spending more than six months on the Billboard album charts, peaking at No. 31. It was voted number 658 in Colin Larkin's All Time Top 1000 Albums 3rd Edition (2000).

== Similarity to "Stairway to Heaven" ==
The guitar part of "Taurus" is said to have influenced Led Zeppelin's Jimmy Page in writing "Stairway to Heaven". Led Zeppelin opened for Spirit on an American tour in 1968, and also borrowed from "Fresh-Garbage" in live performances of the song "As Long as I Have You".

== Release history ==
In 1973, Epic released a two-disc LP repackage of Spirit and Clear simply titled Spirit.

The album was first issued on compact disc in 1996 by Sony. The original 1968 stereo mixes were not available for this release, so the album was remixed in stereo from the original multitrack tapes. This edition also includes four previously unreleased bonus tracks.

In 2017, Audio Fidelity reissued the album as a numbered limited edition hybrid SACD. This edition was remastered from the original 1968 stereo master tapes, which had not been commercially available since the LP release was discontinued in the 1970s. The 2017 edition also includes bonus tracks in the same mixes as those on the 1996 reissue.

== Track listing ==
Side one
No.	Title	Writer(s)	Length
1.	"Fresh-Garbage"	Jay Ferguson	3:11
2.	"Uncle Jack"	Ferguson	2:44
3.	"Mechanical World"	Mark Andes; Ferguson	5:15
4.	"Taurus" (instrumental)	Randy California	2:37
5.	"Girl in Your Eye"	Ferguson	3:15
6.	"Straight Arrow"	Ferguson	2:50

Side two
No.	Title	Writer(s)	Length
7.	"Topanga Windows"	Ferguson	3:36
8.	"Gramophone Man"	Ferguson; John Locke; California; Andes; Ed Cassidy	3:49
9.	"Water Woman"	Ferguson	2:11
10.	"The Great Canyon Fire in General"	Ferguson	2:46
11.	"Elijah" (instrumental)	Locke	10:42

1996 reissue bonus tracks
No.	Title	Writer(s)	Length
12.	"Veruska" (instrumental)	California	2:50
13.	"Free Spirit" (instrumental)	Locke	4:27
14.	"If I Had a Woman"	California	3:11
15.	"Elijah" (instrumental; alternate take #2)	Locke	9:42

== Personnel ==
Spirit

- Jay Ferguson – lead vocals, percussion
- Randy California – guitar, backing vocals, bass, lead vocals (track 14)
- John Locke – keyboards
- Mark Andes – bass, backing vocals
- Ed Cassidy – drums, percussion

Production

- Lou Adler – producer
- Marty Paich – string & horn arrangements
- Eirik Wangberg, Armin Steiner & Mike Leitz – engineers
- Corporate Head – album design
- Tom Wilkes – art direction
- Guy Webster – cover photo
- Jay Thompson – back cover photo
- Terry Clements, Marshall Blonstein, Doug Wallack – assistance
- Vic Anesini – mastering, mixing
- Nicholas Bennett – packaging manager
- Adam Block – project director, project coordinator
- Bob Irwin – producer, compilation producer
- Jeff Smith – package design
- Jay Thompson – photography, insert photography

== Charts ==
Chart (1968)	Peak position
US Billboard 200	31

== See also ==
- Stairway to Heaven lawsuit
