= Tent of Miracles (album) =

Studio album by Spirit
- Released: 1990
- Length: 43:57
- Label: Line
- Producer: Randy California

Spirit chronology
Rapture in the Chambers (1988)	Tent of Miracles (1990)	Time Circle, 1968–1972 (1991)

Professional ratings
Review scores
Source	Rating
Allmusic	3/5 stars

Tent of Miracles is the thirteenth studio album by the band Spirit released through Line Records in 1990. It features original Spirit members Randy California, Ed Cassidy and newcomer Mike Nile.

== Track listing ==
All songs written by Randy California except noted.

No.	Title	Writer(s)	Length
1.	"Borderline"	Cassidy	1:54
2.	"Zandu"		4:24
3.	"Love From Here"		3:47
4.	"Ship of Fools"	Nile	4:10
5.	"Burning Love"		3:06
6.	"Tent of Miracles"	Nile	5:55
7.	"Logical Answers"		2:26
8.	"Old Black Magic"	Nile	3:20
9.	"Neglected Emotion"		2:04
10.	"Imaginary Mask"	California, Cassidy, Nile	2:25
11.	"Stuttgart Says Good-Bye"	California, Cassidy	6:32
12.	"Deep in This Land"	Nile	3:54

== Personnel ==
=== Spirit ===
- Randy California – Guitars, vocals, bass
- Ed Cassidy – Drums, percussion
- Mike Nile – Bass, vocals

=== Production ===
- Kevin Gray – Mastering
