= Live from the Time Coast =

Live album by Spirit
- Released: October 25, 2004
- Recorded: November 18, 1989 – March 27, 1994
- Length: 155:57
- Label: Acadia
- Producer: Mick Skidmore

Spirit chronology
California Blues (1993)	Live from the Time Coast (2004)

Professional ratings
Review scores
Source	Rating
Allmusic	4/5 stars

Live from the Time Coast is a double live CD by Spirit with 28 tracks. It is the fourth album to be released from the archives of the late Randy California. Recorded between 1989 and 1996, with a line-up that features founding members Randy California and drummer Ed Cassidy with Mike Nile on bass. This incarnation of Spirit is referred to by Spirit's hard-core followers as "The Tent Of Miracles Band".

Never released in any form previously and recorded in a number of venues from Manchester to Colorado and from London to Utah.

== Track listing ==
All songs written by Randy California except as noted.

No.	Title	Writer(s)	Length
1.	"Soldier"		3:50
2.	"Mike and Bob's Party"	California, Nile, Valuck	7:12
3.	"Rapture in the Chambers"		6:21
4.	"Love Tonight"		3:04
5.	"Tent of Miracles"	Nile	5:13
6.	"All Along the Watchtower"	Bob Dylan	13:38
7.	"Ship of Fools"	Nile	5:14
8.	"Golden Jam"	California, Cassidy, Nile, Valuck	6:59
9.	"Dark Eyed Woman"	California, Ferguson	5:41
10.	"I Got a Line on You"		3:43
11.	"Jam Free"		7:12
12.	"Downer"		8:51
13.	"In a Young Man's Eyes/Life Has Just Begun"		6:43
14.	"Future in My Hands"		3:10
15.	"Victim of Society"		2:31
16.	"Holy Man"		2:55
17.	"Love from Here"		14:02
18.	"Fresh Garbage"	Ferguson	11:00
19.	"Taurus"		1:31
20.	"Darlin' If"		3:08
21.	"Burning Love"		3:43
22.	"Logical Answers"		4:08
23.	"Blues for a Nation"	Nile	2:43
24.	"Old Black Magic"	Nile	4:45
25.	"Animal Zoo"	Ferguson	4:18
26.	"Deep in This Land"	Nile	4:03
27.	"Zandu"		4:36
28.	"Turn to the Right"		3:38
29.	"Working in New York"		2:05
Total length:			155:57

== Personnel ==
=== Spirit ===
- Randy California – guitar, harmonica, vocals
- Ed Cassidy – percussion, drums
- Mike Nile – bass, vocals
- Scott Monahan – keyboards, vocals
- George Valuck – keyboards

=== Production ===
- Mick Skidmore – producer, mastering
- Pete Tytler – artwork
