= Model Shop =

Model Shop may refer to:

- Model Shop (film), a 1969 Jacques Demy film
- Model Shop (album), the soundtrack to the film, recorded by Spirit
