= The Adventures of Kaptain Kopter & Commander Cassidy in Potato Land =

Studio album by Spirit
- Released: 1981
- Recorded: 1972–73
- Length: 38:31
- Labels: Rhino (USA); Beggars Banquet (UK); Line (Germany)
- Producer: Randy California

Spirit chronology
Future Games (1977)	The Adventures of Kaptain Kopter & Commander Cassidy in Potato Land (1981)	The Thirteenth Dream (1984)

Professional ratings
Review scores
Source	Rating
Allmusic	3/5 stars

The Adventures of Kaptain Kopter & Commander Cassidy in Potato Land was originally recorded by Randy California and Ed Cassidy during the 1972/73 hiatus period of Spirit. A concept album of sorts, interspersed with dialogue, its original scheduled release in May 1973 was cancelled by Epic Records. It was eventually released in an abridged form in 1981, with the first half as new recordings and the second comprising original recordings remixed with overdubs. A reworked and fuller version, still somewhat erroneously credited to Spirit, was released in 2006 and remains available as The Original Potato Land.

== Track listing ==
All songs written by Randy California except noted.

No.	Title	Length
1.	"We've Got a Lot to Learn"	2:16
2.	"Potatoland Theme"	5:09
3.	"Open Up Your Heart"	4:58
4.	"Morning Light"	3:42
5.	"Potatoland Prelude"	2:10
6.	"Potatoland Introduction"	2:27
7.	"Turn to the Right"	5:51
8.	"Donut House"	2:59
9.	"Fish Fry Road"	3:51
10.	"Information"	2:54
11.	"My Friend"	2:14

== Personnel ==
=== Spirit ===
- Randy California – vocals, guitars, bass, miscellaneous devices
- Ed Cassidy – drums, percussion
- John Locke – keyboards
- George Valuck – keyboards

=== Additional musicians ===
- Michael K. Lee – keyboards, vocals
- Mike Bunnell – Strings, Arranger, Conductor, Horn, Keyboards
- Joe Green – Strings, Saxophone
- Kari Nile – Keyboards
- Jeff Jarvis – Horn
- Chuck Snyder – Horn
- Mike Thornburgh – Horn

=== Production ===
- Robert Lee – Engineer
- Mike Stone – Engineer
- Sarah Bullington Berner – Engineer
- Gary Brandt – Engineer
- Bob Burnham – Engineer
- Arnie Acosta – Mastering
- Kathe Schreyer – Design

== Charts ==
Chart (1981)	Peak position
UK Albums (Official Charts)	40
