= Taurus (instrumental) =

Instrumental by Spirit

from the album Spirit
- Released: January 22, 1968
- Recorded: November 1967
- Genre: Psychedelic folk
- Length: 2:37
- Label: Epic Records
- Songwriter: Randy California
- Producer: Lou Adler

"Taurus" is an instrumental by American rock band Spirit, recorded in November 1967 by guitarist/singer Randy California. The recording was released in 1968 on the band's debut album, Spirit. It is perhaps best known for having similarities with the 1971 Led Zeppelin song "Stairway to Heaven", in which guitarist Jimmy Page used an opening acoustic guitar arpeggio bearing a resemblance to the instrumental without any legal permission from the band.

== "Stairway to Heaven" similarity ==
It was alleged that Jimmy Page of Led Zeppelin used the descending guitar-figure from "Taurus" for Led Zeppelin's signature song "Stairway to Heaven". Led Zeppelin had opened for Spirit in an early American tour, providing the possibility that Led Zeppelin had heard the Spirit song before "Stairway to Heaven" was written. In the liner notes to the 1996 reissue of Spirit's debut album, Randy California wrote:

People always ask me why "Stairway to Heaven" sounds exactly like "Taurus", which was released two years earlier. I know Led Zeppelin also played "Fresh Garbage" in their live set. They opened up for us on their first American tour.

== Lawsuit ==
The estate of Randy California, who died in 1997, filed a copyright infringement suit in 2014 seeking a co-writing credit for California on "Stairway to Heaven." In April 2016, California Central District Court Judge Gary Klausner ruled that there were sufficient similarities between the songs to call for Jimmy Page and Robert Plant, credited as co-writers of "Stairway to Heaven", to stand trial by jury for copyright infringement.

The trial began on June 14, 2016. On June 15, 2016, Jimmy Page spent hours on the witness stand testifying. By law, the jury was not allowed to hear original recordings of the songs; instead, they heard an expert perform both songs in court using original sheet music.

The trial concluded on June 23, 2016, with the jury, after one hour of deliberation, finding that Led Zeppelin was not guilty of copyright infringement, determining that while Plant and Page had access to "Taurus", the song's riff was not "intrinsically similar" to the opening of "Stairway to Heaven."

The Wolfe estate filed an appeal, and in September 2018, a three judge panel of the United States Court of Appeals for the Ninth Circuit in San Francisco, California, citing a series of errors by the previous case's judge, ruled 3–0 to throw out the 2016 district court's decision. According to the appeals court decision, the 2016 trial judge erred in failing to instruct jurors that the trustee could prevail if Wolfe had created a "sufficiently original combination" of "otherwise unprotectable music elements," and also in instructing jurors about the copyrighting of music elements in the public domain. In March 2020, the 9th US Circuit Court of Appeals sitting en banc, voted 9 to 2 to let stand the 2016 jury verdict in favor of Led Zeppelin. In October 2020, the Supreme Court of the United States refused to hear the case, leaving the Ninth Circuit's decision in place and effectively ending the dispute.
