= Spirit of '76 (album) =

Studio album by Spirit
- Released: May 1975
- Genre: Psychedelic rock; progressive rock; jam band
- Length: 82:14
- Label: Mercury
- Producer: Randy California

Spirit chronology
Feedback (1972)	Spirit of '76 (1975)	Son of Spirit (1975)

Professional ratings
Review scores
Source	Rating
AllMusic	3.5/5 stars

Spirit of '76, released in May 1975, was the first of four albums that Spirit would (initially) release for Mercury Records, and their sixth album overall. Though all four albums were influenced by the time that Randy California spent living in Hawaii, this album bears that influence more than any of the others (aside from maybe Future Games). Though it was largely ignored upon its first release, many fans consider it to be one of Spirit's best albums.

Most of this double album was compiled as part of the Mercury Years compilation in 1997. It was properly reissued on CD by Beat Goes On in 2003.

== Track listing ==
All songs written by Randy California and Ed Cassidy except noted.

=== Disc One ===
No.	Title	Writer(s)	Length
1.	"America, The Beautiful/The Times They Are A-Changing"	Bates, Ward/Dylan	5:27
2.	"Victim Of Society"		3:00
3.	"Lady Of The Lakes"		2:52
4.	"Tampa Jam Pt. 1"		0:54
5.	"Maunaloa"	California	2:02
6.	"What Do I Have?"	California	2:04
7.	"Sunrise"		3:00
8.	"Walking the Dog"	R. Thomas	3:13
9.	"Tampa Jam Pt. 2"		1:03
10.	"Joker On The Run"	California, Cassidy, Keene	3:53
11.	"When?"	California	4:27
12.	"Like a Rolling Stone"	Dylan	8:54

=== Disc Two ===
No.	Title	Writer(s)	Length
1.	"Once Again"		3:19
2.	"Feeling In Time"		3:27
3.	"Happy"	Mick Jagger, Keith Richards	3:19
4.	"Jack Bond"	Burt Shonberg	1:39
5.	"My Road"	California	4:13
6.	"Tampa Jam Pt. 3"		0:54
7.	"Thank You Lord"	California	1:45
8.	"Urantia"		4:04
9.	"Guide Me"		3:47
10.	"Veruska"	California, Cassidy, Andes	3:57
11.	"Hey Joe"	Billy Roberts	6:30
12.	"Jack Bond Pt. 2"	Shonberg	0:51
13.	"The Star-Spangled Banner"	Francis Scott Key, John Stafford Smith	3:40

== Personnel ==
=== Personnel ===
Spirit

- Randy California – vocals, all instruments except otherwise noted
- Ed Cassidy – drums

Additional musicians

- Barry Keane – bass
- Benji – harpsichord, Moog synthesizer

=== Production ===
- Blair Mooney – engineer
- Craig Renton – assistant engineer

== Charts ==
Chart (1975)	Peak position
US Billboard 200	147
