= Information resource =

An information resource may refer to:

- Resource (computer science), any component of limited availability in a computer system
- Web resource, a data source accessible at the World Wide Web

== See also ==
- Information source (disambiguation)
