= Clear (Spirit album) =

Studio album by Spirit
- Released: September 1969
- Recorded: February 9, 1968 – August 27, 1969
- Genre: Rock
- Length: 42:25
- Label: Ode
- Producer: Lou Adler

Spirit chronology
The Family That Plays Together (1968)	Clear (1969)	Twelve Dreams of Dr. Sardonicus (1970)

Professional ratings
Review scores
Source	Rating
AllMusic	4/5 stars
The Village Voice	C+

Clear is the third studio album by American rock band Spirit. It was released in September 1969 by Ode Records.

The album was written largely in the wake of Spirit's work on the soundtrack to the 1968 film Model Shop. Several of the band members have said that they felt there wasn't enough time for developing the album after releasing two albums in 1968, recording a soundtrack and constantly touring. The album contains "So Little Time To Fly", "Dark Eyed Woman" and "New Dope In Town", as well as three instrumentals.

== Critical reception ==
Reviewing for The Village Voice in 1969, Robert Christgau called Spirit "a talented group with guts of cellophane" and lead vocalist/guitarist Randy California "the rock equivalent of the cool, progressive jazzman of the '50s". He commended the album for focusing the better songs on side one of the LP, saying its "mostly excellent rock" shows Spirit "can be very good", but found songs like "Ice" on side two indicative of how "incredibly empty" the band can be as well.

== 1996 re-release ==
The original Ode Records recording of Clear would be later restored by Sony in 1996. The second edition includes both sides of the "1984" single, the song "Fuller Brush Man" (which hasn't appeared elsewhere), and a piece entitled "Coral", which is also available on the Model Shop soundtrack but is present here in an elaborately produced version. "Coral" is a dedication to groupie Coral Shields, the 11-year-old sister of Sable Starr whom Randy California was dating at the time.

== Track listing ==
Side one
No.	Title	Writer(s)	Length
1.	"Dark Eyed Woman"	Randy California; Jay Ferguson	3:07
2.	"Apple Orchard"	Mark Andes; California; Ed Cassidy; Ferguson; John Locke	4:07
3.	"So Little Time to Fly"	California; Locke	2:49
4.	"Ground Hog"	Ferguson	3:04
5.	"Cold Wind"	Ferguson	3:24
6.	"Policeman's Ball"	Ferguson	2:21

Side two
No.	Title	Writer(s)	Length
7.	"Ice" (instrumental)	Locke	5:52
8.	"Give a Life, Take a Life"	California; Lou Adler	3:23
9.	"I'm Truckin'"	Ferguson	2:25
10.	"Clear" (instrumental)	California; Ferguson	4:09
11.	"Caught" (instrumental)	Locke	3:10
12.	"New Dope in Town"	Andes; California; Cassidy; Ferguson; Locke	4:24
Total length:			42:15

1996 reissue bonus tracks
No.	Title	Writer(s)	Length
13.	"1984" (A-side of Ode single ZS7 128)	California	3:37
14.	"Sweet Stella Baby" (B-side of Ode single ZS7 128)	Ferguson	2:55
15.	"Fuller Brush Man"	Ferguson	3:19
16.	"Coral" (instrumental/includes a commercial for the album during the last minute of the track)	Locke; Cassidy	3:05
Total length:			55:11

== Personnel ==
=== Spirit ===
- Jay Ferguson – lead (1, 4–6, 8, 9, 14, 15) and backing vocals, percussion
- Randy California – guitars, backing and lead vocals (2, 3, 12, 13)
- John Locke – keyboards
- Mark Andes – bass, backing vocals
- Ed Cassidy – drums, percussion

=== Production ===
- Lou Adler – Producer
- Vic Anesini – Mastering, Mixing
- Stachowaik – Engineer
- Steiner – Engineer
- Weinbang – Engineer
- Adam Block – Project Director
- Jeff Smith – Design
- Tom Wilkes – Design
- Guy Webster – Photography

== Charts ==
Chart (1969)	Peak position
Canada Top Albums/CDs (RPM)	29
US Billboard 200	55
