= Hine Ma Tov =

Jewish hymn

Hine (or Hinay or Hinei) Ma Tov (Hebrew: הִנֵּה מַה טוֹב) is a Jewish hymn traditionally sung at Shabbat feasts.

== Origins ==
Its lyrics are from the first verse of Psalm 133, which is translated by the JPS Tanakh as "How good and how pleasant it is that brothers dwell together."

== Lyrics and transliteration ==
English translation	Romanisation	Hebrew
Behold how good and how pleasing	Hinnē ma ṭov uma nāʿim	הִנֵּה מַה טוֹב וּמַה נָּעִים
For brothers/siblings (Note: In Hebrew, the masculine includes the feminine when a mixed group of people are concerned.) to sit together in unity	ševet̲ āḥim gam yaḥad̲	שֶׁבֶת אָחִים גַּם יַחַד

== Popularity ==
Hine Ma Tov continues to be a popular hymn for several Israeli folk dances and is a common song sung by school children and Jewish and Israeli scouting groups. It has been recorded by artists as diverse as Theodore Bikel, The Weavers, Dalida, Meir Finkelstein, Ishtar, the Miami Boys Choir, Joshua Aaron, the Abayudaya of Uganda and the dub group Adonai and I. Harry Belafonte recorded a version on his 1960 album, Belafonte Returns to Carnegie Hall. '60s rock band Spirit recorded an original adaptation for their second studio album, The Family That Plays Together, simply titled "Jewish."

The lyrics of Hine Ma Tov, when translated into English, form the basis for several songs in contemporary Christian music, as well as in various hymnals.

=== Version by the Miami Boys Choir ===
One version Hine Ma Tov was arranged by Yerachmiel Begun, the director of the Miami Boys Choir. Silvio Berlfein choreographed the dance.

=== In popular entertainment ===
In the 1977 television film Raid on Entebbe, Yonathan Netanyahu and Sammy Berg lead the Israeli commandos in singing the refrain while the commandos' plane is en route to rescue the hostages. It is also played during the closing credits. The song also features in the 1990 film Europa Europa where the lyrics are translated as "How sweet it is to be sitting, surrounded by all of your brothers".
