= Tent of Miracles =

Tent of Miracles may refer to:

- Tent of Miracles (album), by the band Spirit
- Tent of Miracles (novel), by Jorge Amado
