= NFO =

NFO may refer to:

== Computing ==
- .nfo, for informational text files with software
- .nfo, for Folio Infobase data files

== Finance ==
- Net financial obligations (or liabilities), of a business
- New fund offer, in Indian mutual funds

== Other uses ==
- National Farmers Organization, an American producerist movement
- Naval Flight Officer, United States Navy and Marine Corps
- The Night Flight Orchestra, a Swedish hard rock band
- NFO, EMS code for Norwegian Forest Cat in the Fédération Internationale Féline
- Nottingham Forest F.C., an association football club

== See also ==
- Info (disambiguation)
