= The Family That Plays Together =

Studio album by Spirit
- Released: December 4, 1968
- Recorded: March 11–September 18, 1968
- Genres: Rock and roll; jazz; classical; country; blues; rock; blues rock
- Length: 34:44
- Label: Ode
- Producer: Lou Adler

Spirit chronology
Spirit (1968)	The Family That Plays Together (1968)	Clear (1969)

Singles from The Family That Plays Together
- 1. "I Got a Line on You" Released: 1968

Professional ratings
Review scores
Source	Rating
AllMusic	4.5/5 stars
Rolling Stone	(positive)
Encyclopedia of Popular Music	5/5 stars

The Family That Plays Together is the second album by the American rock band Spirit. It was released by Ode Records in December 1968. It was voted number 575 in Colin Larkin's All Time Top 1000 Albums 3rd Edition (2000).

The cover was photographed at the Sunset Highland Motel, 6830 Sunset Boulevard in Hollywood, California, across the street from Hollywood High School.

== Title ==
The title alludes to the slogan "The family that prays together stays together", created by ad-writer Al Scalpone for the Family Rosary Crusade and popular in American and British parlance beginning in the 1940s. During this time the band lived together in a house in Topanga, California, near Los Angeles. The title was also inspired by the stepson-stepfather relationship between lead guitarist Randy California and percussionist Ed Cassidy.

== Music ==
The group expands on psychedelic rock and moves toward an early form of progressive rock. "It Shall Be" and "Silky Sam" incorporate jazz influences. "Jewish" has Hebrew lyrics taken from the traditional song "Hine Ma Tov", based on King David's Psalm 133. The album's string and horn arrangements were by Marty Paich, who also created arrangements for the group's self-titled debut album.

== Release history ==
After the first issue, the stereo master tapes for this album were locked in storage and unavailable. Because of this, subsequent CD releases by Sony, as well as the recent vinyl reissue by Sundazed Music, are taken from new stereo mixes made from the original multi-track tapes by Bob Irwin, Randy California and Ed Cassidy in 1996. Liner notes on the 1996 CD reissue state that it was "mixed and mastered by Vic Anesini, Sony Music Studios, New York". (The tracks that appeared on the Time Circle, 1968–1972 compilation were remixed as well, though those mixes are different.)

The 1996 CD reissue also contains five bonus tracks. Two of these appeared on the Time Circle, 1968–1972 compilation, while the other three are previously unissued.

In 2017, Audio Fidelity reissued the album as a numbered limited edition hybrid SACD. This was the first release to use the original stereo mixes since the 1970s. This edition also includes bonus tracks in the same mixes as on the 1996 reissue.

== Track listing ==
Side one
No.	Title	Writer(s)	Length
1.	"I Got a Line on You"	Randy California	2:39
2.	"It Shall Be"	California; John Locke	3:24
3.	"Poor Richard"	Jay Ferguson	2:31
4.	"Silky Sam"	Ferguson	4:57
5.	"Drunkard"	Ferguson	2:27
6.	"Darlin' If"	California	3:37

Side two
No.	Title	Writer(s)	Length
7.	"It's All the Same"	California; Ed Cassidy	4:41
8.	"Jewish"	California	3:23
9.	"Dream Within a Dream"	Ferguson	3:13
10.	"She Smiles"	Ferguson	2:30
11.	"Aren't You Glad"	Ferguson	5:25

1996 reissue bonus tracks
No.	Title	Writer(s)	Length
12.	"Fog" (instrumental)	Locke; California	2:23
13.	"So Little to Say"	Ferguson	2:58
14.	"Mellow Fellow" (instrumental)	Locke	3:46
15.	"Now or Anywhere"	Ferguson	4:20
16.	"Space Chile" (instrumental)	Locke	6:25

== Personnel ==
=== Spirit ===
- Jay Ferguson - lead vocals (2–5, 9–11, 13, 15), keyboards, percussion
- Randy California - lead guitar, lead vocals (1, 3, 6–8) backing vocals, bass
- John Locke - keyboards
- Mark Andes - bass, backing vocals
- Ed Cassidy - drums, percussion

=== Production ===
- Lou Adler - producer
- Bob Irwin - producer
- Marty Paich - horn arrangements, string arrangements
- Vic Anesini - mastering, mixing (reissue)
- Armin Stiener - engineer
- Adam Block - project director
- Tom Wilkes - art direction
- Guy Webster - photography

== Charts ==
Chart (1969)	Peak position
Canada Top Albums/CDs (RPM)	46
US Billboard 200	22
