= Chronicles, 1967–1992 =

Greatest hits album by Spirit
- Released: September 27, 1991
- Recorded: 1967–91
- Genre: Rock
- Length: 72:52
- Label: Line
- Producer: Barry Hansen (tracks 1–4, 22); Spirit (tracks 5–21)

Spirit chronology
Time Circle, 1968–1972 (1991)	Chronicles, 1967–1992 (1991)	Live at la Paloma (1995)

Professional ratings
Review scores
Source	Rating
Allmusic	link

Chronicles, 1967–1992 is a compilation album from the band Spirit. It followed on the heels of the previous year's compilation Time Circle, 1968–1972, which had focused on releasing material from the band's first four studio albums. Chronicles concentrates on unreleased material, such as outtakes, alternate and live versions, and some re-recordings.

== Track listing ==
No.	Title	Length
1.	"If I Had a Woman"	3:17
2.	"Darlin"	3:05
3.	"Hey Joe"	3:36
4.	" I Can't Stand It"	2:50
5.	"Genetic Dreams"	2:02
6.	"Fresh Garbage"	3:49
7.	"Somebody Loves You"	2:42
8.	"Lake of Love"	3:19
9.	"King of Days"	3:04
10.	"I Want Somebody"	2:07
11.	"Reelin' in the Night"	2:41
12.	"Cass Drums"	0:47
13.	"Holy Man"	2:30
14.	"Salvation"	3:47
15.	"Would You Believe"	2:21
16.	"Time to Fly"	2:58
17.	"Nature's Way"	3:11
18.	"Stuck in L.A."	2:33
19.	"Darlin' If"	3:23
20.	"Kokomo"	4:08
21.	"Circle-Prelude"	2:53
22.	"Elijah"	11:52
Total length:		72:52

- 1–4, 22 are from Spirit's 1967 demo tape
- 5–6 are live versions, 5, 8, 10–15 circa 1974
- 7 circa 1975, 9 year unknown
- 16–21 are 1991 recordings
