= Hans Christian von Baeyer =

American physicist

- Born: 1938 (age 87–88)
- Education: Columbia University; University of Miami; Vanderbilt University
- Awards: Andrew Gemant Award (2005); National Magazine Award (1991)
- Scientific career
- Fields: Physics
- Workplaces: College of William and Mary

Hans Christian von Baeyer (born 1938) is a Chancellor Professor of Physics at the College of William and Mary. His books include Information: The New Language of Science, Warmth Disperses and Time Passes: The History of Heat, and QBism: The Future of Quantum Physics.

He received the Science Journalism Award of the American Association for the Advancement of Science and the National Magazine Award in the category "Essays and Criticism," which cites his "uncommon literary grace". In addition, he also won the 2005 Andrew Gemant Award for science writing, for prose "crisp, captivating and illuminating" with "depth, passion and clarity" in the ideas conveyed.

Von Baeyer was born in Germany and left the country during World War II. He graduated from Columbia College in 1958 and received his M.S. from the University of Miami and Ph.D. from Vanderbilt University. He is a descendant of German geologist and military officer Johann Jacob Baeyer, whose son, Adolf von Baeyer, won the 1905 Nobel Prize in Chemistry.

In 1976, von Baeyer was selected as a Fellow of the American Physical Society.

== Bibliography ==
- Baeyer, Hans Christian von (1984). Rainbows, Snowflakes, and Quarks: Physics and the World Around Us. New York: McGraw-Hill.
- — (1993). The Fermi solution: Essays on Science. New York: Random House. ISBN 0-679-40031-1.
- — (1994). Taming the Atom: The Emergence of the Visible Microworld (Penguin Science). London, England: Penguin Books Ltd. ISBN 0-14-015621-6.
- — (July 1995). "Black holes, ants, & roller coasters". Discover. 16 (7): 54–61.
- — (1999). Warmth Disperses and Time Passes: The History of Heat. New York: The Modern Library. ISBN 0-375-75372-9. OCLC 633751312.
  - First published as: Baeyer, Hans Christian von (1998). Maxwell's Demon: Why Warmth Disperses and Time Passes. Random House. ISBN 9780679433422. OCLC 37695758.
- — (2004). Information: The New Language of Science. Cambridge: Harvard University Press. ISBN 0-674-01387-5.
- — (2016). QBism: The Future of Quantum Physics. Cambridge, Mass.: Harvard University Press. ISBN 9780674545342. OCLC 984642826.
