= Dave Waterbury =

- Genres: Pop, rock
- Occupations: Musician, singer-songwriter, producer
- Instruments: Bass, guitar, vocals, keyboard, drums
- Years active: 1979–present
- Website: http://www.davewaterbury.net/

Dave Waterbury is an American music producer, musician, and songwriter from Hoffman Estates, Illinois.

== General information ==
Waterbury was a member the rock band Spirit, having of played bass guitar and sang on three tours in the 1980s. He was also a member of and toured with the group The Box Tops in 1979.

== Background ==
As musician, producer, songwriter, or all three at once, Waterbury has worked with members of The Doors (Robbie Krieger), and Suicidal Tendencies guitarist (Anthony Gallo), Tears for Fears, Randy California, Pink, Mark Kendall of Great White, Ray Charles, 4 Non Blondes, Michael Jackson (Leon Abner), Terri Nunn of Berlin, Betsy of "Bitch", Marco Mendoza (of Whitesnake and Ted Nugent), The Zeros' Sammy Serious, Paul McCartney & Wings, The Doobie Brothers (Michael McDonald and Keith Knutsen), Guitar Jack, Uli Jon Roth of Scorpions, drummer Brian Tichy, Los Angeles Lakers cheerleaders, Chris Poland of Megadeth, David Eagle (Tina Turner's band), and bassist Renny J of (Parliament) and Donna Summer.
