= The Fool Circle =

Studio album by Nazareth
- Released: 6 February 1981
- Studio: AIR (Montserrat)
- Genre: Hard rock
- Length: 36:23
- Label: NEMS
- Producer: Jeff Baxter

Nazareth chronology
Malice in Wonderland (1980)	The Fool Circle (1981)	'Snaz (1981)

Professional ratings
Review scores
Source	Rating
AllMusic	1.5/5 stars

The Fool Circle is the twelfth studio album by Scottish hard rock band Nazareth, released in February 1981. "Cocaine" was a live cover of the song written by J. J. Cale and recorded in 1977 by Eric Clapton. There are remastered editions of the album with different sets of bonus tracks.

Because in 1997 Castle Communications was unwilling to produce a 2-CD set of the double live album 'Snaz, four tracks were removed so that a remastered version could be released on a single CD. Rob Corich, who was doing the remastering, included these songs here as bonus tracks to rectify this.

The Fool Circle is notable for a reggae sound on many of the songs. In an interview bassist Pete Agnew commented: "'Fool Circle' was the nearest we came to making a concept album, trying to inject a bit of humour into a pretty heavy subject. I think the fact that we recorded it on the island of Montserrat might account for a teeny bit of reggae poking its way through."

== Track listing ==
No.	Title	Writer(s)	Length
1.	"Dressed to Kill"	Pete Agnew, Dan McCafferty	3:30
2.	"Another Year"	Manny Charlton	3:28
3.	"Moonlight Eyes"	McCafferty	3:33
4.	"Pop the Silo"	Agnew, McCafferty	3:18
5.	"Let Me Be Your Leader"	Charlton	3:49
6.	"We Are the People"	Agnew, McCafferty	3:33
7.	"Every Young Man's Dream"	Darrell Sweet	3:16
8.	"Little Part of You"	Charlton	3:28
9.	"Cocaine" (J.J. Cale cover; live)	J.J. Cale	4:34
10.	"Victoria"	Sweet	3:19

- Cocaine was recorded at Wendler Arena, Saginaw, Michigan on 25 May 1980.

=== 2002 30th Anniversary Bonus Tracks ===
No.	Title	Writer(s)	Length
11.	"Morning Dew" (1981 version)	Dobson, Rose	3:56
12.	"Dressed to Kill" (single edit)	McCafferty, Agnew	3:47
13.	"Pop the Silo" (single edit; B-side of Dressed To Kill)	McCafferty, Agnew	3:18
14.	"Let Me Be Your Leader" (live)	Manny Charlton	4:16
15.	"Dressed to Kill" (live)	McCafferty, Agnew	3:32
16.	"Pop the Silo" (live)	McCafferty, Agnew	1:15
17.	"Morgentau" (German language version of Morning Dew)	Dobson, Rose	4:03

=== 2010 Salvo Remaster Bonus Tracks ===
No.	Title	Writer(s)	Length
11.	"Morgentau" (German version of Morning Dew)	Dobson, Rose	4:01
12.	"Crazy (A Suitable Case for Treatment)" (from the Heavy Metal soundtrack)	McCafferty, Charlton, Agnew, Sweet	3:25
13.	"Razamanaz" (live 7-inch EP version)	McCafferty, Charlton, Agnew, Sweet	4:23
14.	"Heart's Grown Cold" (live 7-inch EP version)	Cleminson	5:43
15.	"Talkin' to One of the Boys" (live 7-inch EP version)	Cleminson, McCafferty, Agnew	4:43
16.	"Hair of the Dog" (live 7-inch EP version)	McCafferty, Charlton, Agnew, Sweet	4:54

- Morgentau and Crazy (A Suitable Case for Treatment) are also available on Salvo reissue of 'Snaz album.
- The last four tracks are from unedited version of the EP Nazareth Live released in 1980.

== Personnel ==
=== Band members ===
- Dan McCafferty – vocals
- Manny Charlton – guitars
- Pete Agnew – bass, vocals
- Darrell Sweet – drums

=== Additional musicians ===
- Zal Cleminson – 12-string acoustic guitar on "Cocaine"
- John Locke – keyboards
- Jeff Baxter – synthesizer, vocoder

=== Other credits ===
- Recorded and mixed at AIR Studios
- Geoff Emerick – sound engineer
- Alan Schmidt and Pat Carroll – sleeve design
- Illustration by Chris Moore

== Charts ==
Chart (1981)	Peak position
Canada Top Albums/CDs (RPM)	31
Norwegian Albums (VG-lista)	29
Swedish Albums (Sverigetopplistan)	33
UK Albums (Official Charts)	60
US Billboard 200	70

== Certifications ==
Region	Certification	Certified units/sales
Canada (Music Canada)	Gold	50,000^{^}
^{^} Shipments figures based on certification alone.
