= Information: The New Language of Science =

Book by Hans Christian von Baeyer

- Author: Hans Christian von Baeyer
- Subject: Information Science
- Publication date: 2003

Information: The New Language of Science is a 2003 book by Hans Christian von Baeyer, Chancellor Professor of Physics at the College of William and Mary, examining contemporary information science.
