= Model Shop (film) =

1969 film by Jacques Demy

- Theatrical release poster
- Directed by: Jacques Demy
- Written by: Jacques Demy; Carole Eastman; (English dialogue; credited as Adrien Joyce)
- Produced by: Jacques Demy
- Starring: Anouk Aimée; Gary Lockwood; Alexandra Hay
- Cinematography: Michel Hugo
- Edited by: Walter Thompson
- Music by: Spirit
- Distributed by: Columbia Pictures (United States); Les Écrans de Paris (France)
- Release dates: 11 February 1969 (New York City); 1 April 1969 (United States); 14 May 1969 (France)
- Running time: 97 minutes
- Countries: United States; France
- Language: English
- Budget: $1 million

Model Shop is a 1969 romantic drama film written, directed and produced by Jacques Demy, starring Anouk Aimée, Gary Lockwood and Alexandra Hay, and featuring a guest appearance by Spirit who recorded the accompanying soundtrack. Demy made Model Shop, which was his first English-language film, following the international success of his film The Umbrellas of Cherbourg (1964). Aimée reprises the title role from Demy's 1961 French-language film Lola.

Model Shop makes explicit the fact that Demy's films take place in the same narrative universe. It weaves together the plots of Lola, The Umbrellas of Cherbourg and Bay of Angels (1963).

== Plot ==
In Los Angeles, 26-year-old architect George Matthews is floundering. He is unemployed and in debt, his live-in girlfriend, aspiring actress Gloria, is tired of him, and his car is about to be repossessed.

Going round to friends to scrounge $100 to stave off the finance company, he sees a beautiful foreign woman in a white convertible and follows her to a mansion in the hills.

On the street, he sees the beautiful woman again and follows her. She enters a model shop, a tawdry studio where customers can take erotic photographs, and he books a session with her, but she is uninterested in his attentions. When calling his parents, he learns that his draft notice has arrived, and he must report for Army duty the next week. For the first time, he comes face-to-face with his own mortality.

At home, he finds that Gloria has landed a job with a new admirer, who is taking her out for the evening. Obsessed with the enigmatic foreigner, he returns to the model shop and books another session with her. She tells him she is French, named Cécile but working as Lola, and recounts some of her problems. Abandoned by her husband Michel for a female gambler named Jackie Demaistre, she is trying to make enough money to return to France and her son.

In a tender night of drinking and lovemaking at Lola's apartment, George and Lola talk of their failed romances, their dashed dreams, philosophy, and mortality. Through their conversation, they each find the willpower to continue living, and George gives her the money he had borrowed to save his car. The next morning, when George goes home, he finds Gloria packing to leave. He phones Lola, but her roommate tells him she flew to Paris that morning, having enough cash for a plane ticket. As they talk, a tow truck outside is removing his car. He tells the roommate: "I just wanted to tell her that I love her. I wanted her to know that I was going to begin again. It sounds stupid, I know. But a person can always try."

== Cast ==
- Anouk Aimée as Lola / Cecile
- Gary Lockwood as George Matthews
- Alexandra Hay as Gloria
- Carol Cole as Barbara
- Tom Fielding as Gerry
- Severn Darden as camera shop owner
- Neil Elliot as Fred
- Jacqueline Mille as model No. 1
- Duke Hobbie as David
- Anne Randall as model No. 2
- Craig Littler as Rob
- Hilarie Thompson as girl hippie
- Fred Willard as Gas Station Attendant
- Jon Lawson as Tony
- Jeanne Sorel as secretary
- Jon Hill as newspaper editor

== Production ==
Demy later told the Los Angeles Times:

I came here for a vacation, not to make a movie. But I fell in love with LA. I just had to make a film. It's so marvellous. When I left Paris it was dead. Now I've missed the revolution and everything. But I had been so depressed, so discouraged. I said I must go someplace where something's happening. I don't want to be pretentious but I want The Model Shop to be Los Angeles, 1968 – like Rossellini's Europa '51. Lola is a very small part. She ties the story together. Everything is like a puzzle: it fits together. I want to forget Cherbourg, Rochefort. I've gone as far as I can with that. I needed another language, new problems. This won't be a Hollywood movie. I told them I like to shoot on location, use real people whenever possible. The sound stage, big stars, big budget – I wouldn't enjoy that. I learned the city by driving – from one end of Sunset to the other, down Western all the way to Long Beach. LA has the perfect proportions for film. It fits the frame perfectly.

Demy initially wanted to have a new face in the leading role, and chose the then-unknown Harrison Ford. Columbia Pictures, however, had no confidence in Ford's abilities and demanded that Demy hire a more experienced actor. Gary Lockwood was eventually cast on the basis of his performance in 2001: A Space Odyssey. Demy says Lockwood "had nothing to do in Space Odyssey but he knew how to move. He's very natural, very simple."

Alexandra Hay was cast after Demy saw her in Michael McClure's play The Beard. She was under contract to Columbia, who financed the film. "Alexandra is a free bird", said Demy. "In a certain way she is like Jeanne Moreau ... She has the same strong will. She will succeed because she wants to act. I think maybe Bette Davis was that way too."

Filming began in June 1968. Anouk Aimée did not arrive until four weeks into filming, well after she was expected. Eventually, after Columbia Pictures sent her an ultimatum, Aimée arrived, and filming resumed. "I did Jacques's first film so it has to be that I do his first American film", said Aimée.

Carole Eastman (under the name Adrien Joyce) wrote English dialogue for the film. The Los Angeles rock band Spirit both appears in the film and recorded a soundtrack that was not released commercially for 36 years after the film appeared in theaters.

The building exterior and interior office of the Open City newspaper at 4369 Melrose Avenue appear in a scene, where George visits to talk about his issues with the draft and then learns of his draft notice on the phone with his parents.

The din of Los Angeles oil rigs and the blanket of 1960s LA smog appear in scenes.

== Reception ==
The film performed poorly at the box office. Demy's wife Agnès Varda later said Demy "was less than happy with what Columbia did with Model Shop. They killed it! I don't say it was the greatest picture but opening it in double features in the suburbs! Columbia really let him do what he wanted but he didn't get the point early enough: if you make a cheap movie they don't think anything of it."

Critic Jonathan Rosenbaum views Model Shop as one of Demy's most critically underrated and neglected films, writing that "the play between actuality and artifice is the most complex and unconventional" in the film.

Adrian Martin also celebrated the "still-too-little seen" Model Shop. He notes how it is "keyed into the mild eventfulness of the fait divers, undeniably emotional and momentous events happening to, or resonating within, derisory bodies that can scarcely support, transmit, narrate or pass on that emotion."

Ignatiy Vishnevetsky of The A.V. Club is also a major proponent of Model Shop, writing that Demy's film is "obsessively escapist" and that "every film [Demy] made, whether it had singing in it or not, was essentially a musical; he could make the sad streets of Nantes into an MGM back lot.". In 2011, he included it in his "Cine-Autobiography", a list of unranked films which "opened doors or made [him] turn a corner.".

Charlotte Garson notes how the films of Demy, as in the works of Balzac and Proust, create a universe in which not only themes but characters reappear. A few of the recurring motifs in Model Shop are chance making or marring relationships, lovers parted by war, women surviving by near-prostitution and the US as a world of sunshine where people drive open-top cars. Cécile is not only a character from Lola, which also featured her husband Michel, her lover Frankie and her child, but was mentioned in Les Demoiselles de Rochefort as well. Another mention is of the gambler Jackie from La Baie des Anges.

Model Shop is included on Sight & Sound's "75 Hidden Gems" list. Films on the list were selected by 75 international critics as "unduly obscure and worthy of greater eminence".

When promoting Model Shop, Demy said he wanted to make an all-singing musical in the United States about students titled The Interview, something that never materialised.

== Legacy ==
Quentin Tarantino has cited Model Shop as an inspiration for his 2019 film Once Upon a Time in Hollywood. Likewise, Greta Gerwig has cited the film as an inspiration for her 2023 film Barbie.

== See also ==
- Model Shop, album by Spirit
