= I Got a Line on You =

1968 single by Spirit

Single by Spirit

from the album The Family That Plays Together
- B-side: "She Smiles"
- Released: October 1968
- Recorded: March 11–September 18, 1968
- Genre: Progressive rock; hard rock
- Length: 2:37 (album version); 2:46 (greatest hits version)
- Label: Ode
- Songwriter: Randy California
- Producer: Lou Adler

Spirit singles chronology
"Mechanical World" (1968)	"I Got a Line on You" (1968)	"Dark Eyed Woman" (1969)

"I Got a Line on You" is a rock song by American rock band Spirit, originally recorded during the sessions for their second album, The Family That Plays Together, between March 11 and September 18, 1968. Widely considered to be a rock classic, the song was composed by guitarist/singer Randy California (then 17 years old) and produced by Lou Adler. The single credits engineering by Eric Wienbang. Released as a single ahead of the album by Ode Records in the US in October 1968, it began a slow rise up the charts.

It was picked up by college radio in late November. It was the second single released by the band. The B-side was "She Smiles" (Ode catalog number ZS7-115). 2:37 in length, the song finally peaked at No. 25 on the U.S. Top 100 on March 15, 1969, and No. 28 in Canada, March 24.

Some international versions were released later in 1968 and early 1969, distributed by CBS Records or Columbia Records. Some were produced in psychedelic colored vinyl patterns, while the Ode release was on plain black vinyl with a plain yellow label. The album version was slightly longer at 2:39, while the greatest hits version (Time Circle, 1968-1972) is timed at 2:47. A 7:34 version appears on the band's final reunion album, 1984's The Thirteenth Dream.

== Reviews ==
A Billboard review brief called it "the near definitive rock single". Matthew Greenwald of AllMusic said it is "Driven by a fabulously funky guitar riff and some very accessible lyrics, the song is a rock classic from beginning to end."

== Cover versions ==
The song has been covered by Blackfoot, Chagall Guevara, Patrick Cowley, Alice Cooper, Jeff Healey, Juicy Lucy, Who Watchiz Ze Watchmain, Ile Kallio, Kim Mitchell, Mushroom with Gary Floyd, The Woggles, and the supergroup Hollywood Vampires. Cover versions by Joe Moss and the Danish band Lost and Found were released as "I've Got A Line On You". Country band 1880 released a version titled "I Gotta Line on You". Because of the lyrics, occasionally "Babe" has been added to the end of the song title.

== Use in popular culture ==
The song was used in the trailer for the Coen Brothers' 2008 film Burn After Reading.
