= Jimmy James and the Blue Flames =

1966 rock band fronted by Jimi Hendrix

- Also known as: The Blue Flames; the Rain Flowers; the Blue Flame
- Origin: New York City
- Genres: Rock; blues; R&B
- Years active: 1966
- Past members: Jimi Hendrix; Randy California; Randy Palmer; Danny Casey

Jimmy James and the Blue Flames was an American rock group that was fronted by Jimi Hendrix, who was then going by the name "Jimmy James". The band was Hendrix's first extended foray into the 1966 Greenwich Village music scene and included future Spirit guitarist Randy California, then 15 years old. At various New York clubs, they played a mix of rock, blues, and rhythm and blues songs as well as early versions of songs that became part of the Jimi Hendrix Experience repertoire. It was at such a performance that the Animals' bassist Chas Chandler first heard their rendition of "Hey Joe" and decided to invite Hendrix to England and become his producer and manager.

== Background ==
After his discharge from the United States Army in 1962, Jimi Hendrix toured and recorded with several well-known R&B artists, including the Isley Brothers and Little Richard. By 1965, he had become more or less established in New York's Harlem neighborhood and performed with local R&B outfits Curtis Knight and the Squires and King Curtis. However, by mid-1966, Hendrix became disillusioned with the confines of the R&B scene and barely subsistence-level wages. Following the advice of folk singer and guitarist Richie Havens, he began exploring New York's Greenwich Village, a bohemian-style enclave of Manhattan.

At the time, the Village had a vibrant and diverse music scene and Hendrix was able to land a gig at the Cafe Wha? backed by the house band. He soon attracted other musicians and settled on the name Jimmy James and the Blue Flames, although he would later sometimes refer to the band as "the Rain Flowers", "the Blue Flames" and "the Blue Flame". According to Randy California, "All I remember was that it was being called Jimmy James & the Blue Flames. Maybe it was changed for one night ... just for fun". Hendrix chose "the Blue Flames" as a nod to Memphis blues singer Junior Parker's backup band (with the accomplished guitarists Pat Hare, succeeded by Wayne Bennett and Mel Brown) and because it rhymed with his stage name, Jimmy James.

At first, the band was a trio with Hendrix, bassist Randy Palmer and drummer Dan Casey. (Note: Dan Palmer and Dan Casey both were from Texas and played in the band Clouds.) They soon added a second guitarist, Randy Wolfe, who Hendrix met at Manny's Music. With two Randys in the band, Hendrix called Wolfe "Randy California" and Palmer "Randy Texas" after their home states and, according to Roby, he became "Jimi James" (California was unaware that his last name was Hendrix until radio show host Dr. Demento showed him the Are You Experienced album cover and he heard the songs). Although Jeff Baxter claims that he sat in on bass when Palmer was unavailable, California did not recall him. Drummer Danny Taylor, who later played with Silver Apples, also claims to have sat in with the band.

== Repertoire ==
At the Cafe Wha?, one of the first songs performed by Jimmy James and the Blue Flames was "Wild Thing", then a Top-40 radio hit by the Troggs. Another was "Hey Joe" – Hendrix preferred the slower, moodier version by folk musician Tim Rose over the fast hit rendition by the Leaves. Other songs included Bob Dylan's "Like a Rolling Stone", "Hang On Sloopy" and "House of the Rising Sun". Sometime Hendrix collaborator Paul Caruso recalled a performance of the Beatles' "Rain" with the bassist attempting to sing John Lennon's backwards vocal at the end of the song. Randy California also remembered "High Heel Sneakers", "Jimmy Reed kind of songs", and "some standard blues things", such as Muddy Waters and Bo Diddley songs, also found on John Hammond Jr.'s blues-rock album So Many Roads (1965). During his time in the Village, Hendrix was distancing himself from the Harlem R&B scene, where he felt overly criticized because of his evolving guitar style and lifestyle. However, he continued to play covers of R&B hits with the Blue Flames, such as "Shotgun", "In the Midnight Hour" and "Mercy, Mercy", a song he had recorded with Don Covay. (Note: In his sometimes controversial biography, Charles R. Cross also lists "Killing Floor", "Knock on Wood" and "Summertime" that are not mentioned elsewhere.)

Also performed were early versions of Hendrix compositions that the Experience later recorded. Hendrix biographer Keith Shadwick commented

He [Hendrix] continued to compose new tunes so that the Blue Flames were not just a covers band. People around him at this time remember Hendrix playing embryonic versions (or at least portions) of "Third Stone from the Sun", "The Wind Cries Mary" and "Remember" in addition to "Red House".

The Blue Flames also performed "Mr. Bad Luck", later recorded by the Experience, which first appeared as "Look Over Yonder" on Rainbow Bridge and later on Valleys of Neptune; later Hendrix biographer/producer John McDermott identified "Mr. Bad Luck" as "among the few original compositions Hendrix performed in tiny Greenwich Village nightspots as a little known guitarist fronting Jimmy James & the Blue Flames in 1966". According to Frank Von Elmo, an early jam partner, they also played an early "Foxy Lady" and guitarist Bob Kulick remembered "a primitive version of 'Third Stone from the Sun'". When Are You Experienced was first released, early supporter Linda Keith (who brought Hendrix to the attention of Chandler) said "none of the tracks [on the album] were a complete surprise to her, because most featured riffs, patterns and ideas she'd first heard in Greenwich Village that summer [of 1966]".

== Performances ==
According to Randy California, Jimmy James and the Blue Flames often played five sets a night, sometimes six days a week for little more than tips. After about a month into their three month stint at the Cafe Wha?, the group, with Hendrix as the focus, began to receive attention from the music establishment. Giorgio Gomelsky (producer for the Yardbirds), Andrew Loog Oldham (the Rolling Stones), John Hammond (Dylan/Columbia Records), and Seymour Stein (Sire Records) were among those who scouted the group's performances. Other musicians who caught their sets around New York included members of the Rolling Stones, the Lovin' Spoonful, the Paul Butterfield Blues Band, and the Animals. In an interview, Butterfield guitarist Mike Bloomfield described Hendrix's guitar work:

H-bombs were going off, guided missiles were flying – I can't tell you the sounds he was getting out of his instrument. He was getting every sound I was ever to hear him get, right there in that room with a Stratocaster, a [Fender] Twin [amplifier], a Maestro fuzz [box], and that was all – he was doing it mainly through extreme volume ... That day, Hendrix was laying things on me that were more sounds than licks, but I found, after hearing him two or three more times, that he was into pure melodic playing and lyricism as much as he was into sounds. He had melded them into a perfect blend.

John Hammond Jr., who recorded several early blues-rock albums with members of the Band, Charlie Musselwhite and Bloomfield, also became involved with Jimmy James and the Blue Flames. In addition to Hendrix, Hammond had been "particularly impressed with Randy California's slide [guitar] technique". After several rehearsals with the group, they backed Hammond during his two-week engagement at the Village's Cafe au Go Go during late August and September. They were dubbed the "Screaming Night Hawkes [sic]", although in a newspaper ad, they were listed as "John Hammond & the Blue Flame". Hammond remembered Al Kooper and Barry Goldberg occasionally sitting in on keyboards and Hendrix performing one solo number by Bo Diddley, possibly "I'm a Man". Other musicians who recalled their shows include Buzzy Linhart (who later added vibraphone to Hendrix's "Drifting"), Robbie Robertson, John Sebastian and Stefan Grossman.

== Chas Chandler and breakup ==
Jimmy James and the Blue Flames managed to attract a lot of attention during their short run and the Animals' Chas Chandler was the first to offer the all-important deal. Chandler had just heard Tim Rose's folk-rock arrangement of the Billy Roberts song "Hey Joe" and thought that it might be a good vehicle to launch a new artist and his career as a producer. By chance, when Linda Keith brought him to hear the Blue Flames in August, the first song they played was "Hey Joe"; in the often repeated Bob Kulick quote, Chandler "became so excited he spilled his milkshake all over himself". (Note: At that time, Cafe Wha? did not have a license to sell alcoholic beverages.) Upon his return to New York in September, Chas Chandler brought Michael Jeffery to hear Hendrix with Hammond at the Cafe au Go Go and the two agreed to become Hendrix's co-managers.

Although it would have been fitting to continue in a blues-based vein that was then popular with the Paul Butterfield Blues Band, John Hammond, and the Blues Project,

Hendrix already knew that he was looking for more than that. He was looking for an all-inclusive musical language. Chas Chandler's encouragement and advice suggested that he could encompass those ambitions. The future, it seemed, was with Chandler.

Hendrix wanted to keep the group together, but bringing them to England (with California still a minor) was unworkable. He expressed his discomfort to several other Village musicians: "Jimi felt guilty, but he was going through with it", recalled Ellen McIlwaine, a folk singer whom Hendrix had accompanied at the Cafe Au Go Go. Although his economic circumstances had not improved appreciably, playing with the Blue Flames enabled him to explore his own sound and material. It also allowed him to raise his expectations – after one last gig with Curtis Knight and the Squires, where he was again criticized for being too flashy and loud, he ripped out his guitar cord and announced, "That's the last time I play this shit. I'm going to England."

== Notes ==
Footnotes

Citations

References

- Belmo; Loveless, Steve (1998). Jimi Hendrix: Experience the Music. Burlington, Ontario: Collector's Guide Publishing. ISBN 1-896522-45-9.
- Black, Johnny (1999). Jimi Hendrix: The Ultimate Experience. New York City: Thunder's Mouth Press. ISBN 1-56025-240-5.
- Brown, Tony (1992). Jimi Hendrix: A Visual Documentary – His Life, Loves and Music. London: Omnibus Press. ISBN 978-0-7119-2761-2.
- Cross, Charles R. (2005). Room Full of Mirrors: A Biography of Jimi Hendrix (1st. Trade Paperback ed.). New York City: Hyperion Books. ISBN 0-7868-8841-5.
- McDermott, John; Kramer, Eddie; Cox, Billy (2009). Ultimate Hendrix. New York City: Backbeat Books. ISBN 978-0-87930-938-1.
- McDermott, John (1997). South Saturn Delta (CD booklet). Jimi Hendrix. Universal City, California: MCA Records. MCAD-11684.
- McDermott, John (2010). Valleys of Neptune (CD booklet). Jimi Hendrix. New York City: Legacy Recordings. 88697 64056 2.
- Roby, Steven (October–November 1994). "Randy California interview". Straight Ahead (The International Jimi Hendrix Fanzine).
- Roby, Steven (2002). Black Gold: The Lost Archives of Jimi Hendrix. New York City: Billboard Books. ISBN 0-8230-7854-X.
- Roby, Steven; Schreiber, Brad (2010). Becoming Jimi Hendrix. Cambridge, Massachusetts: Da Capo Press. ISBN 978-0-306-81910-0.
- Shadwick, Keith (2003). Jimi Hendrix: Musician. San Francisco: Backbeat Books. ISBN 0-87930-764-1.
