= Twelve Dreams of Dr. Sardonicus =

Studio album by Spirit
- Released: November 27, 1970
- Recorded: April–October 1970
- Studios: Sound City Studios Van Nuys, CA
- Genres: Psychedelic rock, progressive rock
- Length: 38:58
- Label: Epic
- Producer: David Briggs

Spirit chronology
| Clear (1969) | Twelve Dreams of Dr. Sardonicus (1970) | Feedback (1972) |

Professional ratings
Review scores
| Source | Rating |
|---|---|
| AllMusic | 4.5/5 stars |
| Christgau's Record Guide | B |
| Encyclopedia of Popular Music | 5/5 stars |

Twelve Dreams of Dr. Sardonicus is the fourth album by the American rock band Spirit. It was produced by David Briggs, who is best known for his work with Neil Young. The original LP was released in November 1970 by Epic. The band's lowest charting album to that point, it peaked at No. 63 on the Billboard 200 in February 1971, spending only fourteen weeks on the chart. However, it sold well as a catalog item and became the band's only album to ultimately attain a RIAA gold certification in the U.S., achieving that status in 1976. On the Canadian RPM Magazine Top 100 charts, the album reached no. 49 and was in the top 100 for 10 weeks.

"Nature's Way" became one of Spirit's signature songs, but was not a big hit at the time, peaking at No. 111 on the Billboard pop chart in 1971. To capitalize on the album's enduring appeal, "Mr. Skin" (the B-side of "Nature's Way") was released as an A-side in 1973 and also charted, peaking at No. 92. It was voted number 332 in Colin Larkin's All Time Top 1000 Albums 3rd Edition (2000).

Despite these commercial limitations, Twelve Dreams of Dr. Sardonicus enjoyed significant airing on college FM radio. The album was re-issued on CD in 1988 by MFSL, without bonus tracks, and in 1996 by Sony in remastered form, with bonus tracks. A 2022 two-CD release by Cherry Red Records also included several bonus tracks and a 1970 performance at the Fillmore West.

== Reception ==
Writing in Rolling Stone, Nick Tosches opined that the album was a "blockbuster" despite some shortcomings.

== Track listing ==
All tracks are written by Randy California, except where noted.

Side one
| No. | Title | Writer(s) | Length |
|---|---|---|---|
| 1. | "Prelude – Nothin' to Hide" | | 3:41 |
| 2. | "Nature's Way" | | 2:30 |
| 3. | "Animal Zoo" | Jay Ferguson | 3:20 |
| 4. | "Love Has Found a Way" | California; John Locke | 2:42 |
| 5. | "Why Can't I Be Free" | | 1:03 |
| 6. | "Mr. Skin" | Ferguson | 3:50 |

Side two
| No. | Title | Writer(s) | Length |
|---|---|---|---|
| 7. | "Space Child" (instrumental) | Locke | 3:26 |
| 8. | "When I Touch You" | Ferguson | 5:35 |
| 9. | "Street Worm" | Ferguson | 3:40 |
| 10. | "Life Has Just Begun" | | 3:22 |
| 11. | "Morning Will Come" | | 2:58 |
| 12. | "Soldier" | | 2:43 |
| Total length: | | | 38:58 |

1996 reissue bonus tracks
| No. | Title | Writer(s) | Length |
|---|---|---|---|
| 13. | "Rougher Road" | | 3:16 |
| 14. | "Animal Zoo" (mono single version) | Ferguson | 3:10 |
| 15. | "Morning Will Come" (alternate mono mix) | | 2:58 |
| 16. | "Red Light Roll On" | | 5:40 |
| Total length: | | | 52:22 |

== Personnel ==
=== Spirit ===
- Jay Ferguson – vocals (1, 3, 4, 6, 8, 9, 10, 14), percussion, keyboards
- Randy California – guitars, vocals (1, 2, 4, 5, 10–13, 15, 16), bass
- John Locke – keyboards, art direction
- Mark Andes – bass, vocals
- Ed Cassidy – drums, percussion

=== Additional personnel ===
- Matt Andes – Dobro (on "Nothin' to Hide")

=== Production ===
- David Briggs – Producer
- Vic Anesini – Mastering
- Adam Block – Project Director
- David Blumberg – Horn Arrangements ("Mr. Skin", "Morning Will Come")
- Ira Cohen – Photography
- Jeff Smith – Package Design
- Bob Irwin – Compilation Producer

== Charts ==
| Chart (1970–71) | Peak position |
|---|---|
| Canada Top Albums/CDs (RPM) | 49 |
| UK Albums (Official Charts) | 29 |
| US Billboard 200 | 63 |

| Chart (2022) | Peak position |
|---|---|
| UK Independent Albums (Official Charts) | 38 |
| UK Rock & Metal Albums (Official Charts) | 10 |

== Certifications ==
| Region | Certification | Certified units/sales |
|---|---|---|
| United States (RIAA) | Gold | 500,000^{^} |
^{^} Shipments figures based on certification alone.

== See also ==
- Mr. Sardonicus, a 1961 horror film
