= Info =

Info is shorthand for "information". It may also refer to:

== Computing ==
- .info, a generic top-level domain
- info:, a URI scheme for information assets with identifiers in public namespaces
- info (Unix), a command used to view documentation produced by GNU Texinfo
- Info.com, a search engine aggregator
- .info, the filename extension for metadata files used by the Amiga Workbench
- .nfo, a filename extension for informational text files accompanying compressed software.

== Media ==
- 3CatInfo (TV channel), a Catalan television news channel
- Info TV, a Lithuanian news television station
- La Chaîne Info, a French television news channel
- MDR Info, the former name of German radio station MDR Aktuell
- RTS Info, Swiss-French television news channel
- SRF info, a Swiss-German television news channel
- SWI swissinfo, a Swiss news and information portal
- TVP Info, a Polish television news channel
- TVR Info, a Romanian television news channel
- ZDFinfo, a German television channel

== Other uses ==
- Info (band), an industrial metal band from Colombia
- Info-chan, a character in Yandere Simulator
- .info (magazine), a computer magazine
- International Fortean Organization, publishers of the INFO Journal
- Miss Info or Minya Oh, an American radio presenter
