= Information source =

Information source may refer to:

- Information source (mathematics), a kind of sequence of random variables
- Source text, a text (sometimes oral) from which information or ideas are derived
- Guide to information sources, a kind of "metabibliography". Ideally it is not just a listing of bibliographies, reference works and other source texts, but more like a textbook introducing users to the information sources in a given field (in general).
- U+2139 ℹ INFORMATION SOURCE, a grapheme used to indicate the existence of an information board or to highlight other information in a manual
