= Spirit (band) =

American rock band founded in 1967

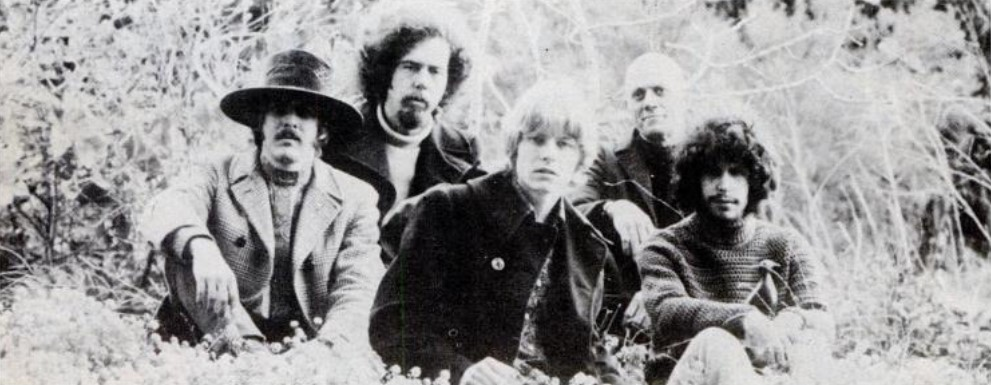
- The original lineup of the band in 1968. Left to right: Jay Ferguson, John Locke, Mark Andes, Ed Cassidy, Randy California

Background information
- Origin: Los Angeles, California, U.S.
- Genres: Psychedelic rock; progressive rock; art rock
- Years active: 1967–1973; 1974–1979; 1982–1997
- Labels: Ode; Epic; Repertoire Records; Mercury; Rhino; Beggars Banquet; Line Records
- Past members: See below

Spirit was an American rock band founded in 1967 and based in Los Angeles. Their most commercially successful single in the United States was "I Got a Line on You". They were also known for their albums, including their self-titled debut album, The Family That Plays Together, Clear, and Twelve Dreams of Dr. Sardonicus.

== Original lineup ==
The original lineup of the group evolved from a Los Angeles band, the Red Roosters, which included Randy California (born Randy Craig Wolfe; guitars, vocals), Mark Andes (bass) and Jay Ferguson (vocals, percussion). With the addition of California's stepfather Ed Cassidy on drums, and keyboard player John Locke, the new band was originally named the Spirits Rebellious (after a book by Kahlil Gibran), but the name was soon shortened to Spirit. Before returning to his native state, California previously played with Jimi Hendrix as a member of Jimmy James and the Blue Flames in New York City's Greenwich Village in 1966. Hendrix gave Randy Wolfe the nickname "Randy California" to distinguish him from Randy Palmer, whom Hendrix named "Randy Texas".

Cassidy was recognizable by his shaved head (hence his nickname "Mr. Skin", later the title of a Spirit song) and his fondness for wearing black. Born in 1923, he was about twenty years older than the rest of the group. Although his earlier career was primarily in jazz (including stints with Cannonball Adderley, Gerry Mulligan, Roland Kirk, Thelonious Monk and Lee Konitz), he had served as the founding drummer of Rising Sons, an early blues rock vehicle for Taj Mahal and Ry Cooder.

== 1960s ==
Early demo recordings by the band were produced by their Topanga Canyon roommate Barry Hansen, later known as the radio host Dr. Demento. In August 1967, the record producer Lou Adler (known for his work with The Mamas & the Papas and The Grass Roots) signed the band to his label, Ode Records. The group's first album, Spirit, was released in 1968. "Mechanical World" was released as a single (it lists the playing time merely as "very long"). The album was a hit, reaching number 31 on the Billboard 200 and staying on the chart for seven months. A song from the album, "Fresh Garbage", was included on the CBS sampler album The Rock Machine Turns You On, released in 1968 in the UK, Europe and South Africa, and was the UK's first introduction to the band.

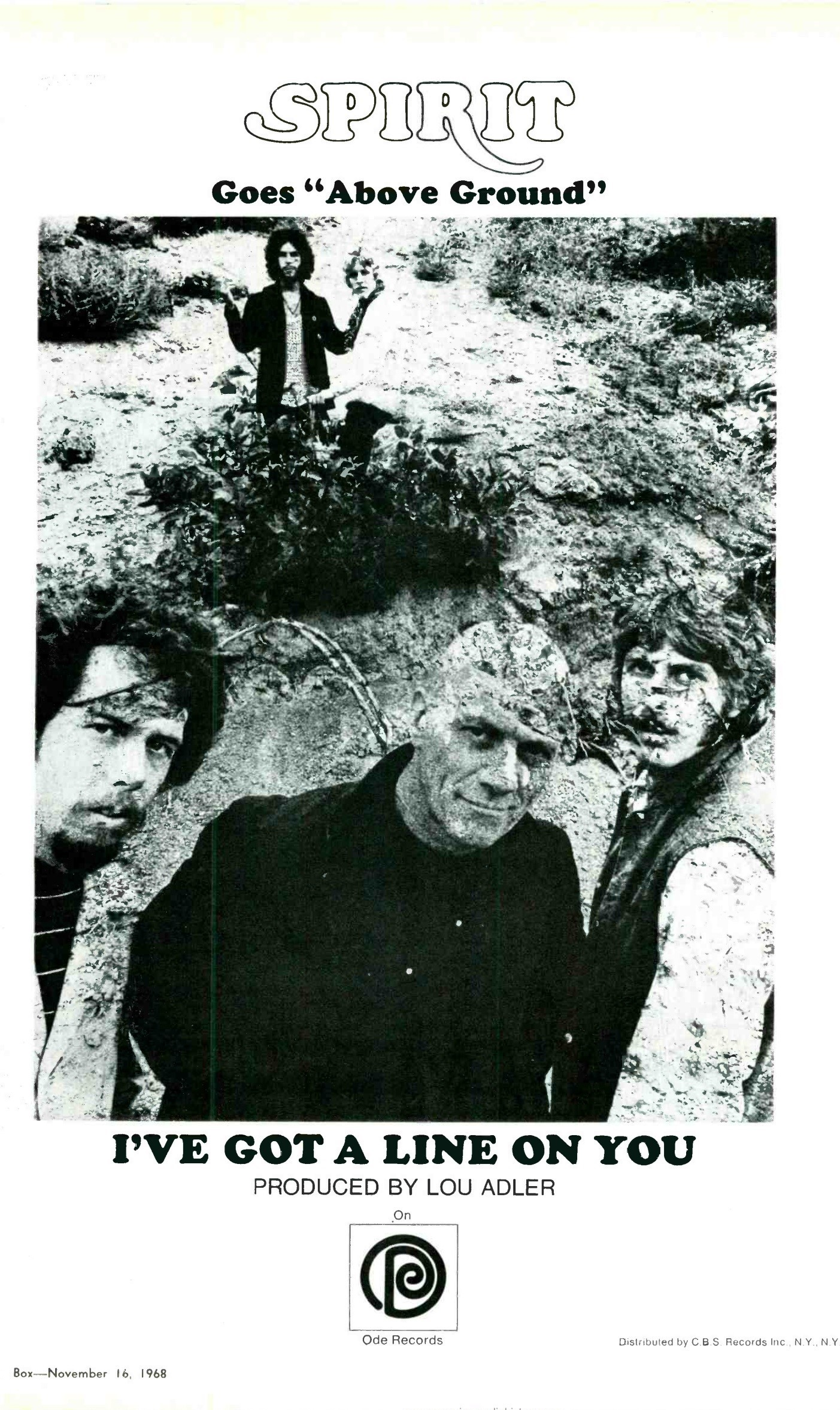
Cashbox advertisement, November 16, 1968

The band capitalized on the success of their first album with another single, "I Got a Line on You". Released in November 1968, a month before their second album, The Family That Plays Together, it became their biggest hit single, reaching number 25 on the charts (number 28 in Canada). The album matched its success, reaching number 22. In December, they appeared at the Denver Auditorium, with support band Led Zeppelin, who soon after interpolated parts of Spirit's song "Fresh Garbage" in an extended medley based around their cover of Bob Elgin and Jerry Ragavoy's "As Long as I Have You" (initially popularized by Garnet Mimms) during their early 1969 concerts. Spirit also appeared with Led Zeppelin at two outdoor music festivals in July 1969. Jimmy Page's use of a theremin has been attributed to his seeing Randy California use one that he had mounted to his amplifier. Guitar World magazine stated that "California's most enduring legacy may well be the fingerpicked acoustic theme of the song 'Taurus', which Jimmy Page was accused of copying note for note for the introduction to 'Stairway to Heaven'." The Independent noted the similarity in 1997. In 2014, Mark Andes and a trust acting on behalf of Randy California filed a copyright infringement suit against Led Zeppelin in an attempt to obtain a writing credit for "Stairway to Heaven". Page denied copying "Taurus", and the suit was unsuccessful. The verdict was overturned on appeal in September 2018. On March 9, 2020, the Ninth Circuit re-instated the original jury verdict.

After the success of their early records, the group was asked by French film director Jacques Demy to record the soundtrack to his film Model Shop, and they also made a brief appearance in the film. Their third album, Clear, released in 1969, reached No. 55 on the chart.

== "1984" and the Sardonicus era ==
In late 1969, Lou Adler moved distribution of his record label, Ode Records, from Columbia Records to A&M Records. As part of the termination agreement, Columbia was allowed to keep the group under contract. Further releases would be shifted to the Epic Records label.

After the release of Clear, the group recorded the song "1984", written by California and produced by the group on their own. After being released in February 1970, it placed at No. 69 on the Billboard chart and No. 66 on the RPM chart. The song would finally see general release on The Best of Spirit in 1973. The song was later covered by Nash the Slash on his 1984 album American Band-ages.

In 1970, Spirit started working on their fourth LP Twelve Dreams of Dr. Sardonicus. The band chose frequent Neil Young collaborator David Briggs as the producer at the recommendation of the singer-songwriter, an acquaintance from the Topanga Canyon scene. It was a prolific time for the group's writers, and the album was released in late 1970, peaking at No. 63 in early 1971 in the US, and No. 49 in Canada. The album included Randy California's "Nature's Way", a minor hit (No. 111) which was written in an afternoon during an engagement at the Fillmore West in San Francisco.

Epic also released an early mix of "Animal Zoo" as a single, but it too only made it to No. 97 on the chart. Like The Who's Tommy and Pink Floyd's The Dark Side of the Moon, Twelve Dreams of Dr. Sardonicus is critically regarded as a landmark of art rock, with a tapestry of literary themes about the fragility of life and the complexity of the human experience, illustrated by recurring lyric "life has just begun", and continued the group's pioneering exploration of environmental issues in their lyrics (cf. "Fresh Garbage"). The album is also notable for its inventive production and the use of a modular Moog synthesizer.

== 1971–73 ==
After the group undertook a promotional tour to support the album Twelve Dreams of Dr. Sardonicus, Ferguson and Andes left the group, forming Jo Jo Gunne. California had accused them of plotting to take over the group. Their final gig with Spirit occurred on January 30, 1971, which almost ended with a fist-fight.

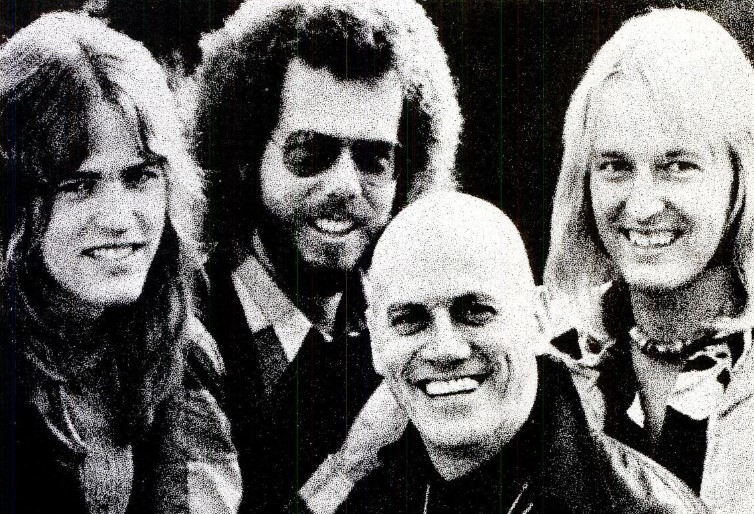
Spirit in 1972. Left to right: John Chris Staehely, John Locke, Ed Cassidy, Al Staehely

John Arliss initially took Andes' place. California was still in the lineup, but he had suffered a head injury from a horse riding accident and was unable to tour. Shortly thereafter, bassist and recent University of Texas School of Law graduate Al Staehely was recruited by Locke and Cassidy to replace Arliss. The trio toured briefly before deciding that they had to add a guitarist to do the music justice. Al's brother, John Christian (Chris) Staehely, auditioned for the band and was quickly brought on board, departing the Texas rock group Krackerjack.

The Staehelys, Cassidy and Locke recorded the 1972 album Feedback in Columbia/Epic's Hollywood studios. It was a different turn for the group, showing more of a country rock influence pervading their jazzier tendencies, but it met with only a mild commercial response, reaching No. 63 in the chart. While the tour for Feedback proceeded well for much of that year, Cassidy and Locke lacked an affinity for roots-based music and soon left the lineup. The Staehely brothers completed the critically successful tour with drummer Stu Perry before dissolving the group in mid-1973 and releasing their own album, Sta-Hay-Lee.

California, meanwhile, had recorded and issued his first solo album, Kapt. Kopter and the (Fabulous) Twirly Birds, also on Epic Records in late 1972. Featuring appearances by Noel Redding (as "Clit McTorius"), Leslie Sampson (the drummer from Redding's band Road; as "Henry Manchovitz"), and Cassidy, the album had a hard rock sound. Following a brief tour in support of the album in the Los Angeles area with Cassidy and bassist Larry "Fuzzy" Knight, California toured Europe with this trio under the imprimatur of Spirit amid pressure from booking agents who wanted to capitalize on the band's name and were not interested in his solo work. During this period, a follow-up album (The Adventures Of Kaptain Kopter And Commander Cassidy In Potato Land) also was recorded with Cassidy. Although Locke made a guest appearance, it was not intended as a Spirit album at the time. California moved to Molokai, Hawaii, after Epic rejected the completed album.

In 1973, Epic Records decided to re-issue the group's first and third albums as a two-fer entitled Spirit in response to Sardonicus continuing to sell well as a catalog item; eventually, Sardonicus earned the band's only RIAA gold certification in 1976. That same year, Epic issued The Best of Spirit compilation album alongside the Sardonicus track "Mr. Skin" as a single. "Mr. Skin" became another minor hit (peaking at No. 92), and the two-fer also hit the charts along with The Best of Spirit. Cassidy decided to capitalize on the new demand for the group and put together an entirely new group for touring purposes, which lasted throughout the year.

== The Mercury years (1974–79) ==
In 1974, Cassidy made it a point to find and re-establish contact with his stepson. He eventually persuaded California to return to the mainland and give the band another shot. Andes worked with the duo for a while, but never intended to stay, as he was in the process of forming the group Firefall at the same time. Andes was replaced by former Frank Zappa sound engineer Barry Keene.

In early 1975, the group was scheduled to open for Ten Years After at a show in Florida, but when the headlining band backed out at the last minute, Spirit was granted permission to take over the theater for the evening. After going around to local radio stations to promote the show and setting a low ($3) ticket price, Spirit managed to sell out the 3,000-seat theater. Using the profits from the show, they blocked out as much time as they could at Studio 70 in Tampa, Florida.

After recording a large amount of material at the studio, manager Marshall Berle (the nephew of Milton Berle) offered the cache of tapes to Mercury Records. On the basis of the material, the group was offered a contract, and a double album entitled Spirit of '76 was culled from the material and released in May 1975. The album peaked at No. 147 and garnered some FM airplay, so they quickly followed it up with Son of Spirit, released later that year and featuring many songs taken from the same sessions.

For the tour in support of Son of Spirit, Locke re-joined the group. Eventually, Andes returned to the lineup as well, and although Ferguson declined to participate in the group reunion at first, the band (with the addition of Mark's brother Matt Andes as a second guitarist) recorded an album entitled Farther Along, released in late 1976.

=== First full reunion and Future Games ===
For a few shows at the Santa Monica Civic Auditorium, Ferguson re-joined the group. Neil Young created an incident during the final show's encore of "Like a Rolling Stone" when he walked on stage inebriated. California would later claim that he did not recognize Young, but at the time was angry with Young for upstaging what he saw as his own comeback. California moved over in front of Neil and began pushing him backwards, away from the microphone, back past the drumkit and offstage. Young, along with other influential artists including New Hollywood director Hal Ashby, had been visiting the band backstage before they went on, and Locke (a friend of Young) had invited the guitarist to join them in their encore. When Locke saw California pushing Young offstage, he got up from his piano and said that he had had enough and did not ever want to play with California again, walking off stage. Cassidy initially quelled the situation by leaving his kit and physically pulling both California and Young back onstage to the microphone to close out the song, asking the audience to sing along with them. After finishing the song, the band members argued backstage over what had unfolded leading to the end of the reunion.

Afterwards, California assembled Future Games: A Magical Kahauna Dream with Cassidy and limited assistance from session musicians. The experimental album included a Hendrix-influenced cover of "All Along the Watchtower" and underpinned science fiction-based lyrical themes with many samples from Star Trek: The Original Series in a variant of filk. Although Mercury approved its release in early 1977, it received no promotion and peaked at No. 179 on the U.S. chart, ending what little commercial momentum the group might have regained. It also (initially) ended their contract with Mercury. During this period, Ferguson was having success in his solo career with the hits "Thunder Island" (1977; No. 9) and "Shakedown Cruise" (1979; No. 31).

=== Return to trio ===
In a reprise of the Kapt. Kopter-era trio, California, Cassidy and Larry "Fuzzy" Knight toured extensively as Spirit throughout 1978; an English leg saw the band headline a triple bill that included post-punk ensemble Alternative TV and The Police. Throughout the tour, California doubled on the foot-controlled Moog Taurus to partially compensate for the lack of a keyboardist. The German TV/radio programme Rockpalast recorded and broadcast Spirit's entire show of March 4/5, 1978, including the encore jam where Dickey Betts joined the band. This trio lineup also recorded a heavily overdubbed live album (also released in 1978) that was released in slightly different configurations in several countries by different independent labels. It was not a commercial success, and after the tour's end in 1979, California left the group again.

== The 1980s and beyond ==
After Spirit's demise, California put together another group with the short-lived intent of restarting his solo career. While in England, a fan presented him with a petition of 5,000 signatures requesting the release of the Potato Land album from 1973. Consequently, in 1981, California released an overdubbed selection of tracks from the original album alongside several unrelated songs dating from the late 1970s. Contrary to the intention of the original sessions, it was released under the imprimatur of Spirit in the United States by Rhino Records a nascent archival label with ties to Dr. Demento and in Britain by Beggars Banquet Records, a well-regarded independent label specializing in punk rock and its derivations. It was the only Spirit album other than Sardonicus to chart in Britain, peaking at No. 40 in the UK Albums Chart and receiving airplay on BBC Radio 1.

On February 14, 1982, Spirit, performed as a three-piece band, Randy California, Ed Cassidy and an unknown bass player, at Kiel Auditorium in St. Louis, Missouri. The show was sponsored and heavily promoted by local rock radio station K-SHE 95 and billed as; "K-SHE 95 presents the 5th Annual St. Valentine's Day Massacre," JOHN KAY & STEPPENWOLF, w/special guests; SPIRIT. The show was a near sell out with a little over 7,000 to 8,000 in attendance. California's second solo album, Euro-American, was released in 1982 by Beggars Banquet. It featured a lineup including drummer Preston Heyman. During this period, California performed on the second tier at the 1982 Glastonbury Festival. When the power generator failed—allegedly because the operator had fallen asleep stoned and neglected to refill the fuel—Heyman performed a twenty-minute solo while the situation was rectified.

In December 1982, the original Spirit lineup re-formed and recorded several songs from their first four albums (as well as a few new tracks) live on a soundstage. The band was joined by several guests, including Jeff Baxter and Bob Welch. The resulting Spirit of '84 (released internationally as The Thirteenth Dream) was initially recorded for an audiophile label; however, Mercury Records re-signed the band (including a California solo deal) and released the album in 1984. The album was only a moderate critical success and failed to chart. While some of the original members went on to do other projects, California and Cassidy continued touring with new members Scott Monahan on keyboards and Dave Waterbury on bass.

California headed to England and recorded his third solo album, the contemporary hard rock effort Restless, for which Heyman (who played on the track "Jack Rabbit") secured a deal with Phonogram for in late 1985. Following a few live dates in England, California returned to the United States and resumed touring extensively with Cassidy, Monahan, and Waterbury. There was one more solo album from California: a collection of material entitled Shattered Dreams that was released in 1986.

In 1988, California secured a deal for Spirit with prominent independent label I.R.S. Records (best known for cultivating R.E.M. and The Go-Go's), leading Locke to rejoin the band. They recorded an album entitled Rapture in the Chambers at the Malibu, California, recording studio Nileland, where studio owner/engineer, bassist and vocalist Mike Nile was asked to join the band. Although the group (including California, Cassidy, Locke, Nile, Monahan, and George Valuck on keyboards) toured extensively in support, the album failed to chart. California, Cassidy, and Nile continued to tour as a power trio while self-releasing Tent of Miracles in 1990. Nile contributed heavily to the album, writing songs and sharing lead vocals.

Spirit continued working almost continually for the next six years. Although they only released one album after Tent of Miracles, the group was always either recording or touring. California had his own home recording studio since the early 1980s, though he had been making home recordings for years prior to that. This came to an end on January 2, 1997, when California drowned off the coast of Hawaii. He had been surfing with his son, who got caught in a riptide. He managed to push his son to safety but ended up losing his own life.

While Cassidy played a few dates with Spirit alumni under the name "Spirit Revisited" in 1998, California's death was effectively the end of the group. Locke died of complications resulting from lymphoma in August 2006. Cassidy died on December 6, 2012, in San Jose, California, at age 89.

== Posthumous ==
California's death, however, did not mark the end of the emergence of Spirit material. Starting in 2000, there have been five collections of previously unreleased studio and live material, four of which were two-CD sets. California had also prepared an anthology of material from the group's first stint with Mercury Records entitled The Mercury Years. The two-CD set was released in early 1997, though it raised the ire of some fans who did not care for the fact that some of the material had been re-edited or featured overdubbing that was not present on the original releases.

Likewise, nearly all of Spirit's original albums are currently in print on CD. This is thanks to the efforts of Sony Music (with the Epic catalog, though Collector's Choice Music was the first to reissue Feedback on CD in the U.S., following a brief release on disc in France in the late 1990s) and Beat Goes On alongside Edsel, both UK labels (with the Mercury catalog, some of which had made it to CD prior to Beat Goes On and Edsel reissuing all of their Mercury albums). Their later independent albums are available through the group's website. The one album that is unavailable at this time is Rapture In The Chambers, which has not been reissued since the original 1989 release, though it was released on CD at that time.

Spirit has also found its work sampled by modern artists several times. The most notable of these was the "Extra P. Remix" of the song "Resurrection" by Common (which samples "Ice" from Clear) and "Feel Good Time" by Pink (which samples the track "Fresh Garbage").

In 2015, "I Got a Line On You" was covered by Alice Cooper's super group the Hollywood Vampires on the album of the same name.

In 2022, "The Other Song" was used for the outro of the Season 3, Episode 6, '710N' episode of the "Barry" series

== Musical style ==
"The notes identify them as 'pioneers' of 'topical lyrics that were realized by the production of the song,' which makes me think again about the way the first two cuts, '1984' and 'Mechanical World,' shift texture and tempo. By the stars, I do believe these fellows helped invent art-rock. This is not an unmixed distinction, but it could be worse: the topicality is a notch above ordinary rock sci-fi (they have a sense of humor), the derivations more jazz than classical. The big plus here though, is that great shining 2:39 of hard rock guitar, Randy California's 'I Got a Line on You.'"

— The Best of Spirit review in Christgau's Record Guide: Rock Albums of the Seventies (1981)

According to AllMusic, Spirit was an "ambitious and acclaimed West Coast psychedelic band that fused hard rock to jazz, blues, country, and folk"; Formed by an eclectic group of musicians who had backgrounds in rock, pop, folk, blues, classical music and jazz, Spirit "had an eclectic musical style in keeping with the early days of progressive rock" and they "seemed determined to out-eclecticize everybody else on the California psychedelic scene, with [their] melange of rock, jazz, blues, folk-rock, and even a bit of classical and Indian music." Robert Christgau wrote that Randy California was "the rock equivalent of the cool, progressive jazzman of the '50s".

== Band members ==
Original lineup

- Randy California – guitar, vocals (1967–1972, 1972–1973, 1974–1979, 1982–1997; died 1997)
- Ed Cassidy – drums (1967–1972, 1972–1973, 1974–1979, 1982–1997; died 2012)
- John Locke – keyboards (1967–1972, 1976, 1982–1985, 1988–1989; died 2006)
- Mark Andes – bass, guitar, vocals (1967–1971, 1974, 1976, 1982–85, 1988–1989)
- Jay Ferguson – vocals, percussion, keyboards, guitar (1967–1971, 1976, 1982–1985)

Later members

Following Sardonicus, many musicians passed through the group's ranks. Most of them did not make a huge contribution to the group's sound, but some did. The most important of the later group members are listed here:

- John Arliss – bass (1971)
- Al Staehely – bass, lead vocals (1971–1973)
- John Christian Staehely – guitar, vocals (1971–1973)
- Stu Perry – drums (1972–1973) (Note: Perry is best known for portraying the drummer who was crushed by the grand piano in The Poseidon Adventure.)
- Scott Shelly – guitar, vocals (1973–1974)
- Donnie Dacus – guitar, vocals (1973–1974)
- Steve Olitski – keyboards (1973–1974)
- Steve Edwards – guitar, vocals (1973–1974)
- Barry Keene – bass (1974–1976)
- Benji – keyboards (1975)
- Matt Andes – guitar, vocals (1976, 1995–1997)
- Larry "Fuzzy" Knight – bass, vocals (1972–1973, 1976–1979)
- Terry Anderson – vocals (1976–1977)
- Scott Monahan – keyboards, bass, vocals (1985–1988, 1990–1995)
- Dave Waterbury – bass, vocals (1985–1988)
- Mike Nile – bass, vocals (1988–1993)
- George Valuck – keyboards (1990–1995)
- Steve "Liberty" Loria – bass, vocals (1993–1997)
- Gordon Patriarca – bass (1995–1996)
- Rachel Andes – vocals (1995–1997)
- Walter Egan – bass, vocals (1997)

== Discography ==
=== Albums ===
Year	Album	US Top 200	UK Albums Chart	Canada	Certification	Label
1968	Spirit	31				Ode
1968	The Family That Plays Together	22		46		Ode
1969	Clear	55		29		Ode
1970	Twelve Dreams of Dr. Sardonicus	63	29	49	US: Gold	Epic
1972	Feedback	63				Epic
1975	Spirit of '76	147				Mercury
1975	Son of Spirit					Mercury
1976	Farther Along	179				Mercury
1977	Future Games					Mercury
1981	The Adventures of Kaptain Kopter & Commander Cassidy in Potato Land		40			Rhino
1984	The Thirteenth Dream / Spirit of '84 [U.S. title]	206				Mercury
1989	Rapture in the Chambers					I.R.S.
1990	Tent of Miracles					Dolphin
1996	California Blues					W.E.R.C. C.R.E.W.
2005	Model Shop (Soundtrack)					Sundazed

=== Live albums ===
Year	Album	US Top 200	UK Albums Chart	Label
1978	Live			Potato
1978	Made in Germany			Kinghat Records
1992	Chronicles, 1967–1992			W.E.R.C. C.R.E.W.
1995	Live at la Paloma			W.E.R.C. C.R.E.W.
2003	Blues from the Soul			Acadia
2004	Live from the Time Coast			Acadia
2006	The Original Potato Land			Acadia
2007	Salvation – The Spirit of '74			Acadia
2008	Rock and Roll Planet...1977–1979			Acadia
2009	California Blues Redux			Audio Fidelity
2010	The Last Euro Tour			Floating World
2011	Tales from the Westside			Floating World
2011	The Original Potato Land			Floating World
2012	Two Sides of a Rainbow – Live at the Rainbow, London 1978			Floating World
2016	Live at the Ash Grove 1967 Volume 1			Flashback

=== Compilations ===
Year	Album	US Top 200	UK Albums Chart
1973	The Best of Spirit	119	
1973	Spirit (reissue of first and third albums)	191	
1975	The Family That Plays Together/Feedback		
1991	Time Circle, 1968–1972		
1997	The Mercury Years		
2000	Cosmic Smile		
2002	Sea Dream		
2005	Son of America		

=== Singles ===
Year	Song titles	US	CAN	Label
1968	"Mechanical World"	123	77	Ode / Columbia
1968	"I Got a Line on You"	25	28	Ode / Columbia
1969	"Dark Eyed Woman"	118		Ode / Columbia
1969	"1984"	69	66	Ode / Columbia
1970	"Animal Zoo"	97		Epic
1970	"Mr. Skin"			Epic
1971	"Nature's Way"	111		Epic
1972	"Mr. Skin" [reissue]	92		Epic
1972	"Cadillac Cowboys"			Epic
1975	"Lady of the Lakes"			Mercury
1975	"Holy Man"			Mercury
1976	"Farther Along"			Mercury
1980	"Turn to the Right"			Rhino
