= Line Records =

- Company type: Private company
- Industry: Music entertainment
- Founded: 1992
- Headquarters: Rio de Janeiro, RJ, Brazil
- Owner: Universal Church of the Kingdom of God

Line Records is a Brazilian gospel record label and it belongs to Universal Church of the Kingdom of God. Was founded in Rio de Janeiro, in 1992 with the intent to tend the gospel music demand. In February 2012, it was announced that Line Records was planning to wind down and pay off its debts over the next five years.

== Artists ==
- Adilson Silva
- Adriana Ferreira
- Adriana Marques
- Banda Audiolife
- Banda Catedral
- Bruna Melo
- Comunidade Bereana
- Cristina Mel
- David Fantazzini
- Fernanda Lara
- Francisco de Assis
- George Hilton
- Gilson Campos
- Gisele Nascimento
- Isis Regina
- J.Neto
- Jamily
- Janaina Brandão
- Juliana Evely
- Kades Singers
- Kim
- Leo Portela
- Leonor
- Ma-Lu
- Mara Maravilha
- Marcelo Brayner
- Marcelo Domingues
- Marcelo Nascimento
- Márcio Pinheiro
- Melissa
- Michelle Nascimento
- Ministério Vem, Ó Deus
- Moysés
- Paulo César Baruk
- Pérolas
- Regis Danese
- Renato Suhett
- Robinson Monteiro
- Rogério Luis
- Salgadinho
- Soraya Moraes
- Sula Miranda
- Gustavo Sibilio Borges

== See also ==
- Rede Aleluia
- Universal Church of the Kingdom of God
