= Mark Andes =

American bassist

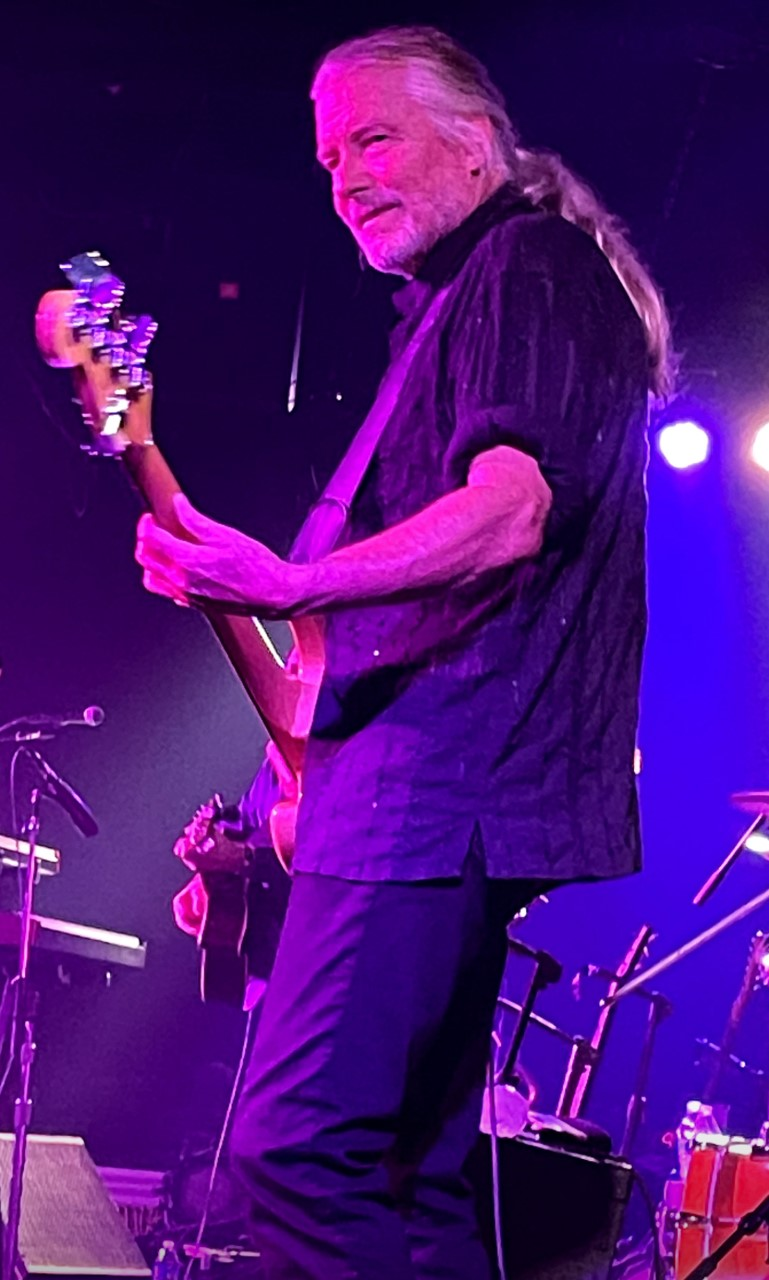
- Andes performing in 2021

Background information
- Born: February 19, 1948 (age 78); Philadelphia, Pennsylvania, U.S.
- Genres: Rock; jazz fusion; blues
- Occupation: Bassist
- Years active: 1965–present
- Website: markandesmusic.com

Mark Andes (born February 19, 1948) is an American musician, known for his work as a bassist with Canned Heat, Spirit, Jo Jo Gunne, Firefall, Heart, and Robert Mirabal.

== Early life ==
Andes was born in Philadelphia, but grew up in Los Angeles, one of two sons of actor Keith Andes (1920–2005).

== Career ==
As a teenager, he was an early member of Canned Heat, but left before the band was signed to a recording contract. Andes was a founding member of the band Spirit. He played bass on their first four albums and on some subsequent reunion albums. During a bout with the flu, Mark co-wrote one of Spirit's first singles, "Mechanical World," with fellow Spirit member Jay Ferguson who was a friend from high school.

Spirit was noted for its hybrid sound of rock and jazz styles. The group released groundbreaking works such as Twelve Dreams of Dr. Sardonicus (1970), that critically were lauded later, but commercial success largely eluded them at the time.

When the original line-up of Spirit broke up, Andes and Jay Ferguson formed the band Jo Jo Gunne. He recruited his brother, Matt Andes, to play guitar. Andes only recorded one album with Jo Jo Gunne before semi-retiring from music around 1972. During his stay, the band had a Top 40 hit with the song "Run Run Run". When Jo Jo Gunne reformed for a new album and gigs in 2004, Andes was included in the line-up.

Andes moved to Boulder, Colorado, where he lived in the basement of local musician Jeff Reaves. In 1975, he was recruited by former Flying Burrito Brothers vocalist Rick Roberts and former Byrds and Flying Burrito Brothers drummer Michael Clarke to form the country-rock band Firefall. For six years, Mark would be in a band that had a string of hit singles, including the Top 10 hit, "You Are the Woman." During the early 1980s, Andes also collaborated briefly with future Yes guitarist Trevor Rabin and future Quiet Riot drummer Frank Banali.

Following a move back to California, and some session work, Andes joined Heart. He appeared on their final album for Epic Records, Passionworks (1983), and remained with the band until 1993. During this time, Heart found mainstream success, with several number one singles, and a number one album, Heart (1985). After a decade with Heart, Andes returned to session work.

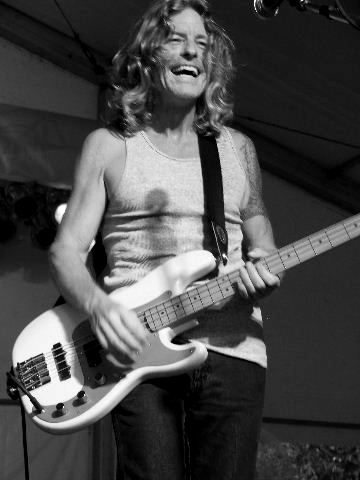
Andes at ACL Festival 2006

In 1995, he joined up with Native American musician Robert Mirabal to collaborate on his album entitled Mirabal.

In 1998, he played bass in the backing band for Iain Matthews (The Swinelakers) on their European tour. He plays on Iain Matthews' album A Tiniest Wham released in 2000.

Andes played in Austin, Texas, with Ian McLagan and the Bump Band, Alejandro Escovedo, Jo Carol Pierce, and Three Balls of Fire. He very briefly played in a band called MPTU with drummer Pat Mastelotto (King Crimson, Mr. Mister), singer Malford Milligan and Phil Brown (Little Feat). Andes now lives near Houston in Magnolia, Texas, with his wife Valerie. He released his first solo album, Real World Magic, in February 2009.

In 2012, Andes played with Kenny Cordray & Love Street on the album titled It Takes Everything.

Andes began playing with Firefall again in 2014, becoming the third original member in the band's current lineup, along with Jock Bartley and David Muse.

He played with French artist Chardeau on his albums Fauves & Pastels (2015) and Sanguines (2017), with Robert Lamm and Jason Scheff (Chicago), John McFee (Doobie Brothers), Brian Auger (Oblivion Express) and Jerry Goodman (Mahavishnu Orchestra).

== Discography ==
=== Spirit ===
- Spirit – 1968
- The Family That Plays Together – 1968
- Clear – 1969
- Twelve Dreams of Dr. Sardonicus – 1970
- Farther Along – 1976
- The Thirteenth Dream – 1984
- Rapture in the Chambers – 1989

=== Jo Jo Gunne ===
- Jo Jo Gunne – 1972
- Jumpin' the Gunne – 1973
- Big Chain – 2005

=== Firefall ===
- Firefall – 1976
- Luna Sea – 1977
- Élan – 1978
- Undertow – 1979

=== Heart ===
- Passionworks – 1983
- Heart – 1985
- Bad Animals – 1987
- Brigade – 1990
- Rock the House Live! – 1991

=== Solo ===
- Real World Magic - 2009

=== Other appearances ===
- John Fahey: The Yellow Princess – 1968
- Richard Torrance: Anything's Possible – 1978
- Jay Ferguson: White Noise – 1982
- Kim Carnes: Café Racers – 1983
- Joe Walsh: The Confessor – 1985
- Eliza Gilkyson: Legends of Rainmaker - 1989
- Dan Fogelberg: Something Old, Something New, Something Borrowed...and Some Blues – 1994, 1995 album released 2000
- Mirabal: Mirabal – 1997
- Robert McEntee: Preserving the Error – 1999
- Iain Matthews: A Tiniest Wham – 2000
- Jackie Lomax: The Ballad of Liverpool Slim – 2001
- Jon Dee Graham: Hooray for the Moon – 2002
- David Lee Holt: Perpetual Motion – 2004
- The Champion Sisters: Unfit to be Tied – 2011
- John Egenes: The Stone Soup Sessions – 2011
- Kenny Cordray & Love Street: It Takes Everything – 2012
- Peter Blast: Painting Without Canvas – 2015
- Peter Blast: Wind Horses – 2017
- Chardeau: Fauves & Pastels – 2015
- Chardeau: Sanguines – 2017
- Mark Taylor Project: Tales From The Yellow Rose – 2021
- Tommy Taylor (musician): Across The Stars – 2023
