= John Locke (musician) =

American keyboardist (1943–2006)

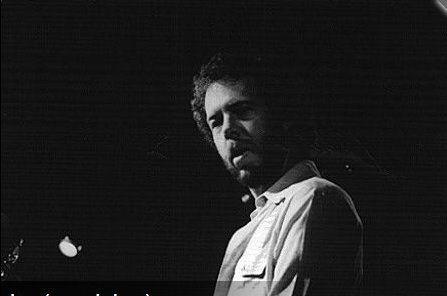
- Locke on stage in Louisiana, October 31, 1975

Background information
- Born: John Tilden Locke; September 25, 1943; Los Angeles, California, U.S.
- Died: August 4, 2006 (aged 62) Ojai, California, U.S.
- Genres: Hard rock, rock
- Occupation: Keyboardist
- Years active: 1962–2006
- Formerly of: Spirit, Nazareth

John Tilden Locke (September 25, 1943 – August 4, 2006) was an American keyboardist and a member of the rock group Spirit. In the early 1980s, he was a member of the band Nazareth.

== Early life ==
Locke was born in Los Angeles, California. His father was a classical violinist and his mother sang operas and was a composer. Locke's mother, Marty, was a classically trained pianist, who taught John how to play the piano. As a teenager, he played in a band with Robby Krieger, later of The Doors.

== Career ==
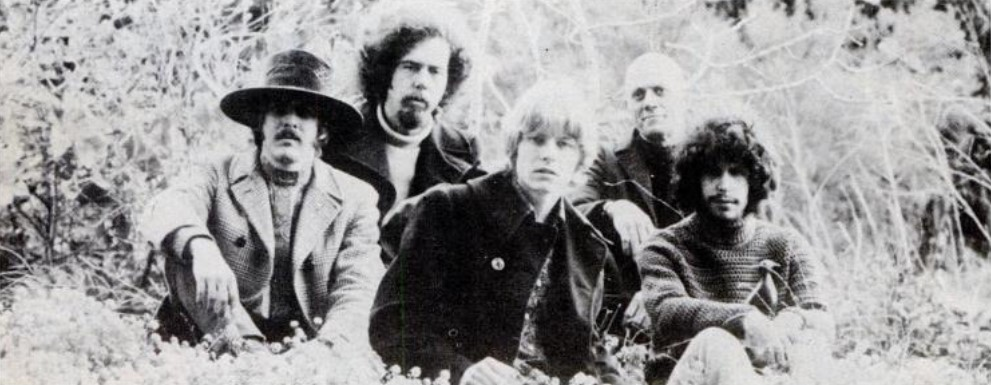
Locke (second from left) in Spirit in 1968

Locke met drummer Ed Cassidy, through his band The New Jazz Trio. In 1967 he formed the Red Roosters with the guitarist Randy California, Cassidy's stepson. A year later they had changed the name to Spirit and signed a deal with Ode Records for four albums. He remained involved with the band during most of his career. After a failed reunion of original Spirit members in 1976, Locke vowed to never work with California again, however he would later join California in Spirit, as well as play on some of California's solo albums.

Besides Spirit, he performed on the Tom Rush album Wrong End of the Rainbow. In the period 1980–1982 he performed with the Scottish band Nazareth and appeared on three albums: The Fool Circle, 'Snaz, and 2XS. He also played keyboards on the Stray Cats album Gonna Ball, and on Randy California's solo albums Euro-American and Restless. Locke later ran his own recording studio.

== Death ==
Locke died from Lymphoma in Ojai, California pm August 4, 2006, at the age of 62. He was survived by his son, Alex.
