= Randy California =

American guitarist and singer (1951–1997)

Background information
- Born: Randy Craig Wolfe; February 20, 1951; Los Angeles, California, U.S.
- Died: January 2, 1997 (aged 45) Molokai, Hawaii, U.S.
- Instruments: Vocals, guitar
- Years active: 1965–1997
- Formerly of: Spirit, Jimmy James and the Blue Flames

Randy Craig Wolfe (February 20, 1951 – January 2, 1997), known as Randy California, was an American guitarist, singer and songwriter, and one of the original members of the rock group Spirit, formed in 1967.

== Life and career ==
California was born Randy Craig Wolfe to Robert Wolfe and Bernice Wolfe (née Pearl) and grew up in a musical Jewish family in Los Angeles. He spent his early years studying varied styles at the family's Los Angeles folk club, the Ash Grove, which was founded by his uncle, Ed Pearl. He was 15 years old when his mother and new stepfather, Ed Cassidy (later to become a founding member of the band Spirit, with Randy), moved to New York City in the summer of 1966 because Cassidy had a number of jazz gigs lined up. It was there, at Manny's Music, that he met Jimi Hendrix.

He played in Hendrix's band Jimmy James and the Blue Flames that summer. California, Cassidy and Pearl lived in an apartment building in Forest Hills, Queens, called the Balfour, whose other residents included future Steely Dan co-founder Walter Becker, who cited California's blues-based guitar style as an influence on his own playing.

The stage name "Randy California" was given to him by Hendrix to distinguish him from another Randy in the band, Randy Palmer, whom Hendrix dubbed "Randy Texas". When Hendrix and California were invited to come to England by Chas Chandler, former bassist of British Invasion band the Animals—who became Hendrix's manager and producer—Randy's parents refused to allow him to go, insisting the 15-year-old stay and finish high school. By some accounts, Chandler wanted Hendrix as the only guitarist for the band and nixed California's going to England.

Together with Cassidy, songwriter/front man Jay Ferguson, bassist Mark Andes (with whom California and Cassidy had initially formed a band called the Red Roosters) and keyboardist John Locke, California founded the band Spirit. Their first, self-titled album was released in January 1968, a month before California's 17th birthday.

He then wrote the band's biggest hit, 1968's "I Got a Line on You" for Spirit's second album, The Family That Plays Together. He also wrote the single "1984", inspired by George Orwell's novel of the same name. Released in early 1970, "the song was so pointed against the U.S. government that it was banned from many radio stations, although it was a huge hit in Germany." In Canada the song reached No. 66. California also wrote Spirit's other hit, "Nature's Way", for the band's best-selling album, Twelve Dreams of Dr. Sardonicus.

== Career ==
Spirit was invited to open for Jimi Hendrix at Woodstock. However, band manager/producer Lou Adler—who had been one of the founders of the rock festival movement two years earlier, as a partner (with Mamas & Papas frontman John Phillips) in the Monterey Pop Festival, where Hendrix premiered in the U.S.—opposed it because the band was busy promoting their latest album, Clear.

When Ferguson and Andes left Spirit to form Jo Jo Gunne due to the slow sales of Sardonicus, and then his dear friend Hendrix died, a depressed California left Spirit. He recorded Kapt. Kopter & The Fabulous Twirly Birds, which included California and Cassidy's version of Paul Simon's "Mother and Child Reunion" plus a slew of Hendrix-inspired tracks (also featuring former Experience bassist Noel Redding, AKA 'Clit McTorius'). In 1972 the album was released at virtually the same moment as Jo Jo Gunne's first, eponymous album that featured "Run, Run Run" and a Spirit album called Feedback that was recorded by Cassidy and Locke (who were Spirit's jazz influences) and guitarist/bassist brother duo Al and John Staehely, who wrote and sang most of the material on the LP.

== Stairway to Heaven copyright dispute ==
In writing Led Zeppelin's "Stairway to Heaven", Jimmy Page allegedly lifted California's guitar riff from "Taurus", an instrumental song from the first Spirit album. Led Zeppelin was on the same bill as Spirit on two American music festival dates in 1969. In the liner notes for the 1996 reissue of Spirit's first album, California stated: "people always ask me why 'Stairway to Heaven' sounds exactly like 'Taurus,' which was released two years earlier. I know Led Zeppelin also played 'Fresh Garbage' in their live set. They opened up for us on their first American tour". The fact that "Fresh Garbage" was a track from the same album that includes the song "Taurus" further suggested that Led Zeppelin was likely aware of the song enough to lead to a belated 2014 copyright infringement and injunction lawsuit against the reissue of Led Zeppelin IV, with the lawyer stating, "The idea behind this is to make sure that Randy California is given a writing credit on 'Stairway to Heaven'."

In June 2016, after a trial that included audio recordings of several versions of both songs but not the Spirit and Led Zeppelin recordings, and also featured testimony from Page and bandmate Robert Plant explaining the songwriting process for "Stairway", a jury ruled that Page and Plant had not copied "Taurus". The decision came under appeal because the judge did not permit the two sound recordings to be played and instead allowed only sheet music. Copyright law had been expanded to include sound recordings in 1974. In September 2018, this decision was overturned. A new trial was unanimously ordered by a three-judge panel of the Ninth U.S. Circuit Court of Appeals in San Francisco on the basis that U.S. District Judge R. Gary Klausner gave jurors erroneous information about copyright law. The panel's decision was subsequently vacated when the Ninth Circuit voted to rehear the case en banc. In September 2019 the appeals court heard introductory arguments and began deliberations as to whether a new trial is in fact warranted. The main issue is that the recording of "Stairway to Heaven" resembles "Taurus" much more than does the printed sheet music, and comments by the court have indicated a possible inclination to hold that only the sheet music pertains to the copyright. On March 9, 2020, the Ninth Circuit ruled against California's estate and re-instated the June 2016 jury verdict. This ruling effectively eliminated the "inverse ratio" rule and could have tremendous impact on future copyright law in the recording industry. In October 2020, the Supreme Court of the United States refused to hear the case, leaving the Ninth Circuit's decision in place and effectively ending the dispute.

== Death ==
California drowned in the Pacific Ocean on January 2, 1997 at the age of 45 while rescuing his 12-year-old son Quinn from a rip current near his mother's home at Molokai, Hawaii. He managed to push Quinn (who survived) toward the shore.

The Randy Craig Wolfe Trust was established after his death and, using royalties from California's recording contracts, financially supports the Randy California Project, an after-school music education program for underprivileged elementary school children in Ventura County.

== Solo albums ==
- Kapt. Kopter and the (Fabulous) Twirly Birds (1972)
- Euro-American (1982)
- Restless (1985)
- Shattered Dreams (1986)
- The Euro-American Years, 1979–1983 (2007) 4-CD set

== Videotaped performances ==
- Night of the Guitar, Hammersmith Odeon, London, November 26, 1988, CD: (IRSD-83000)
- Live at La Paloma Theatre, Encinitas, CA, MTV Video for the song "Hey Joe"
