= Ed Cassidy =

American drummer (1923–2012)

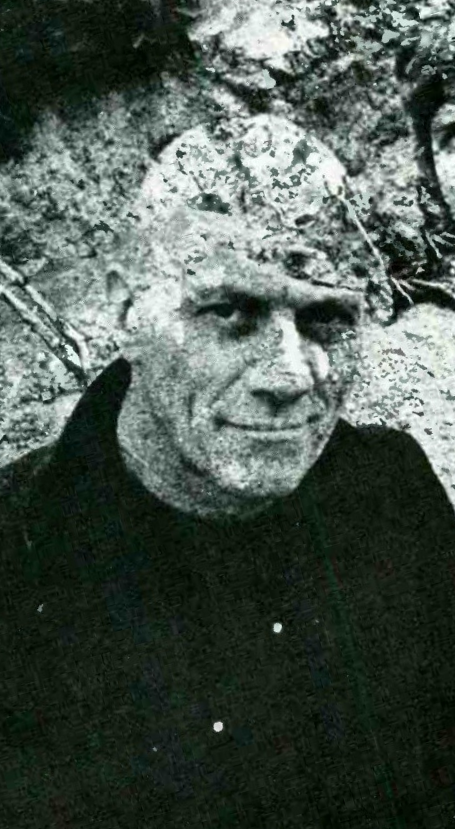
- Cassidy in 1968

Background information
- Born: May 4, 1923; Harvey, Illinois, U.S.
- Origin: Bakersfield, California, U.S.
- Died: December 6, 2012 (aged 89) San Jose, California, U.S.
- Genres: Jazz; rock
- Instrument: Drums
- Years active: 1937–2012

Edward Claude Cassidy (May 4, 1923 – December 6, 2012) was an American jazz and rock drummer who was one of the founders of the rock group Spirit in 1967.

== Biography ==
Cassidy was born in Harvey, Illinois, a south suburb of Chicago on May 4, 1923. His family moved to Bakersfield, California in 1931. Cassidy began his career as a professional musician in 1937. He served in the U.S. Navy during World War II, and after his discharge held many jobs before becoming a full-time musician again. At one time in the late 1940s, Cassidy played 282 consecutive one-nighters in 17 states. He worked in show bands, Dixieland, and country and western bands, and on film soundtracks, as well as having a brief stint with the San Francisco Opera.

In 1950, Cassidy enrolled at college to get a musical teaching credential. However, after a year, he decided to move to Southern California to meet more jazz musicians and perhaps form a group of his own. During this period, Cassidy performed together with many leading jazz musicians including Art Pepper, Cannonball Adderley, Roland Kirk, Lee Konitz and Gerry Mulligan.

With Taj Mahal and Ry Cooder, Cassidy formed the Rising Sons in 1964. After that, he formed the Red Roosters in 1965, with his fourteen-year-old stepson Randy California, Jay Ferguson and Mark Andes. Adding John Locke, they became Spirit in 1967. Cassidy sported a shaved head, which was unusual at that time, and he always wore black. He used a single bass drum, and two large parade bass drums as floor toms. Because California stepped out of the group for a period of time in 1972, following the death of Jimi Hendrix, Cassidy was the only member who played with all various line-ups of Spirit on almost 20 albums over almost 30 years. Spirit finally disbanded following California's death in 1997. Cassidy later performed with Merrell Fankhauser in the Fankhauser Cassidy Band.

From the mid-1970s, Cassidy also worked as an actor, including live improvisation.

== Personal life and death ==
Cassidy had a wife, Beverly, a daughter, Carol Ann Griffith, a son, Christian Padriack Cassidy, and several stepchildren and grandchildren. He had previously been married to Bernice Pearl Wolfe, the mother of Randy California. Cassidy wrote, studied history, and continued to correspond with fans from his residence in Southern California until his death. He died of cancer in San Jose at the age of 89 on 6 December 2012.
