= The Return =

The Return may refer to:

== Literature ==
=== Comics ===
- Heroes Reborn: The Return, a 1997 mini-series following Marvel Comics Heroes Reborn (1996 comic)
- Supreme: The Return, a 1999 comic book limited series featuring Supreme
- Batman: The Return, a 2010 DC Comics one-shot
- Sweet Tooth: The Return, a 2020 Vertigo six-issue limited series, the sequel to Sweet Tooth
- Mighty Morphin Power Rangers: The Return, a 2024 Power Rangers four-issue comic book limited series

=== Fiction ===
- "The Return", an 1894 short story by Robert Murray Gilchrist in the collection The Stone Dragon and Other Tragic Romances
- "The Return" (Conrad short story), by Joseph Conrad, 1898
- The Return, a 1910 novel by Walter de la Mare
- "The Return" or "Homecoming", a 1946 short story by Andrei Platonov
- "The Return" (Piper and McGuire short story), by H. Beam Piper and John J. McGuire, 1954/1960
- The Return (Droit novel), by Michel Droit, 1964
- The Return, a 1968 novel by Lionel Fanthorpe under the pseudonym Pel Torro
- The Return, a 1973 novel by Isidore Haiblum
- The Return, a 1978 novel by Evelyn Anthony
- The Return, a 1981 novel by K. S. Maniam
- The Return, a 1987 novel by Richard Laymon
- The Return, a 1987 novel by Sonia Levitin
- The Return, a 1988 novel by Terry Harknett as George G. Gilman, in the Adam Steele series
- America 2040: The Return, a 1988 novel by Hugh Zachary as Evan Innes, in the America 2040 series
- The Return (Paulsen novel), or The River, by Gary Paulsen, 1991
- The Return, a novel written in 1985 by Edwin Charles Tubb in the Dumarest series
- Remember Me 2: The Return, a 1994 novel by Christopher Pike, in the Remember Me series
- The Return (Nesser novel), by Håkan Nesser, 1995
- The Return, a 1996 novel by Gene Edwards, in the Chronicles of the Door series
- The Return (Shatner novel), a 1997 Star Trek novel by William Shatner
- The Return, a 1999 novel by Brian Freemantle as Andrea Hart
- The Return, a 1999 novel by Marilyn Kaye, in the Last on Earth trilogy
- The Return (Applegate novel), a 2000 book in the Animorphs series by K. A. Applegate
- The Return (Aldrin and Barnes novel), by Buzz Aldrin and John Barnes, 2000
- The Return, a 2001 novel by Peter Turnbull
- The Return, a 2002 novel by Bentley Little
- The Return, a 2006 novel by John Vornholt based on the TV series Flight 29 Down
- X-Men: The Return, a 2007 novel by Chris Roberson
- The Return, a 2008 novel by Victoria Hislop
- The Return, a 2009 novel by Ben Bova, in the Grand Tour novel series
- The Return (L'énigme du retour), a 2009 book by Dany Laferrière
- The Vampire Diaries: The Return, a 2009–2011 trilogy of novels by L. J. Smith
- The Return (short story collection), by Roberto Bolaño, 2010

=== Non-fiction ===
- The Return, by Petru Popescu, 1997
- The Return: Grace and the Prodigal, J.John and Chris Walley, 2010
- The Return (memoir), by Hisham Matar, 2016

=== Plays ===
- The Return (play), by Reg Cribb, 2001
- The Return, a 2022 play by John Harvey

== Films ==
- The Return (1916 film), starring William S. Hooser
- The Return (1921 film), a silent British film by Fred Paul
- The Return (1979 film), a Yugoslav film
- The Return (1980 film), an American science fiction film
- Cocoon: The Return, a 1988 American science fiction comedy-drama film
- Nostos: The Return, a 1989 Italian adventure drama film
- The Return (1992 film), a Danish film about the return of Jesus
- Bonanza: The Return, a 1993 American Western TV film
- Cagney & Lacey: The Return, a 1994 American police procedural drama TV film
- Universal Soldier: The Return, a 1999 American science fiction action film
- The Return (2003 film) (Vozvrashcheniye), a Russian drama film
- The Return, a 2003 British TV film starring Julie Walters
- The Return (2006 film), an American psychological horror film starring Sarah Michelle Gellar
- The Return, or The Lucky Ones, a 2008 film
- The Return (2013 film), a Venezuelan film
- The Return (2024 film), a film adaptation of The Odyssey by Homer

== Television ==
=== Episodes ===
- "Chapter 24: The Return", an episode of The Mandalorian
- "The Return", Aahat season 1, episodes 82–83 (1997)
- "The Return" (Agents of S.H.I.E.L.D.) (2017)
- "The Return", @Gina Yei: WithAllMyHeartAndMore episode 9 (2023)
- "The Return" (Arrow) (2015)
- "The Return", Baahubali: The Lost Legends season 5, episode 9 (2020)
- "The Return" (Ben 10) (2007)
- "The Return", Beowulf: Return to the Shieldlands episode 1 (2015)
- "The Return", Black Saddle season 2, episode 21 (1960)
- "The Return", Bonanza season 6, episode 31 (1965)
- "The Return", Criminal Minds season 9, episode 8 (2013)
- "The Return", Crusoe episode 13 (2009)
- "The Return", Dilbert season 2, episode 13 (2000)
- "The Return", Doctor Who season 3, episode 28; episode 3 of The Ark (1966)
- "The Return", Falcon Crest season 9, episode 20 (1990)
- "The Return", Finders Keepers season 1, episode 5 (1991)
- "The Return", Fright Krewe season 2, episode 6 (2024)
- "The Return" (Girls) (2012)
- "The Return", Hawkeye episode 22 (1995)
- "The Return", Hollywood 7 episode 13 (2001)
- "The Return" (Homeland)
- "The Return", JAG season 5, episode 4 (1999)
- "The Return", Johnny Staccato episode 14 (1959)
- "The Return", Justice League Unlimited season 1, episode 8 (2004)
- "The Return", Kong: The Animated Series season 1, episodes 1–2 (2001)
- "The Return", Lawman season 1, episode 32 (1959)
- "The Return", Meet the Wife series 5, episode 3 (1966)
- "The Return", Megas XLR season 2, episode 2 (2004)
- "The Return", Ocean Girl series 2, episode 1 (1995)
- "The Return", Offspring season 2, episode 1 (2011)
- "The Return" (Once Upon a Time)
- "The Return", Owen, M.D. series 1, episodes 33–34 (1972)
- "The Return", Phoenix II episode 4 (1993)
- "The Return", Power Rangers Mystic Force episode 30 (2006)
- "The Return", Queen of Swords episode 17 (2001)
- "The Return", Room 104 season 2, episode 9 (2018)
- "The Return", Scavengers Reign episode 11 (2023)
- "The Return", Shin Ikki Tousen episode 1 (2022)
- "The Return", Speed Racer: The Next Generation season 2, episodes 1–3 (2011)
- "The Return" (Star Wars: The Bad Batch) (2024)
- "The Return" (Stargate Atlantis) (2006/2007)
- "The Return", Starman episode 1 (1986)
- "The Return", Stupid, Stupid Man season 2, episode 5 (2008)
- "The Return", T. J. Hooker season 3, episode 1 (1983)
- "The Return" (The Amazing World of Gumball) (2015)
- "The Return", The Curse of Civil War Gold season 2, episode 1 (2019)
- "The Return", The Family Business season 4, episode 8 (2022)
- "The Return!", The Guild season 3, episode 10 (2009)
- "The Return", The Hollow season 2, episode 3 (2020)
- "The Return", The Immortal episode 12 (1970)
- "The Return", The Legend of Prince Valiant episode 14 (1991)
- "The Return", The Lone Ranger season 4, episode 46 (1955)
- "The Return", The Morose Mononokean season 2, episode 11 (2019)
- "The Return", The Musketeers series 2, episode 5 (2015)
- "The Return" (The Office) (2007)
- "The Return" (Once Upon a Time) (2012)
- "The Return", The Secret of Eel Island series 2, episode 1 (2005)
- "The Return", The Secret of Skinwalker Ranch season 4, episode 7 (2023)
- "The Return", The Secret World of Alex Mack season 4, episode 14 (1997)
- "The Return", The Stranded episode 2 (2019)
- "The Return" (The Vampire Diaries) (2010)
- "The Return", The Waltons season 6, episodes 23–24 (1978)
- "The Return", V: The Series episode 19 (1985)
- "The Return", Viper season 4, episode 1 (1998)
- "The Return" (What We Do in the Shadows) (2020)
- "The Return", Window on Main Street episode 1 (1961)
- "The Return", Young Dracula series 3, episode 10 (2011)

=== Series ===
- Twin Peaks season 3, billed as Twin Peaks: The Return, 2017
- The Returned (French TV series) (Les Revenants), 2012
- Heroes II: The Return, 1991

== Music ==
=== Albums ===
- The Return (Hi-Five album), 2005
- The Return (Kamaal Williams album), 2018
- The Return (Nonpoint album), 2014
- The Return (Pat Martino album), 1987
- The Return (Pharao album), 1998
- The Return (Ruben Studdard album), 2006
- The Return (Sampa the Great album), 2019
- The Return (Shinhwa album), 2012
- The Return (Vanilla Fudge album), 2002
- The Return, a 1995 album by Melodie MC
- The Return, a 2011 album by Machel Montano
- The Return, a 2012 album by actress and singer Lauryn Hill
- The Return, a 2023 album by Living Legends
- The Return......, a 1985 album by Bathory

=== Songs ===
- "The Return", a song by Danny Brown from his 2013 album Old
- "The Return", a song by Hypocrisy from their 2013 album End of Disclosure
- "The Return", a song by Killswitch Engage from their 2009 album Killswitch Engage
- "The Return", a song by Omnium Gatherum from their 2008 album The Redshift
- "The Return", a song by Shadow of Intent from their 2017 album Reclaimer
- "The Return", a song by War of Ages from their 2019 album Void

== Other uses ==
- 2021 Tampa Bay Buccaneers–New England Patriots game, known as "The Return"

== See also ==
- Awda (disambiguation) (Arabic, 'Return')
  - Palestinian right of return, Al-Awda
- Return (disambiguation)
- Returner (disambiguation)
- The Returned (disambiguation)
- The Returning, a 1990 Australia-New Zealand horror film
