= Return =

(The) Return(s) may refer to:

== Business , economics, and finance ==
- Product return, the process of bringing back merchandise to a retailer for a refund or exchange
- Rate of return, the financial term for the profit or loss derived from an investment
- Return on investment (ROI), the financial gain after an expense.
- Returns (economics), the benefit distributed to the owner of a factor of production
- Tax return, a form on which a taxpayer makes an annual statement of income and personal circumstances, used by the tax authorities to assess liability for tax

== Technology ==
- Aux-return, the input complement of an Aux-send output
- Carriage return, a key on an alphanumeric keyboard commonly equated with the "enter" key
- Return (architecture), the receding edge of a flat face
- "Return", synonym of "register", "grille" in HVAC system
- Return code, a method of messaging status in software
- Return statement, a computer programming statement that ends a subroutine and resumes execution where the subroutine was called

== Arts and entertainment ==
=== Film ===
- Return, a 1954 Hong Kong film directed by Lee Dut
- Return (1985 film), a film directed by Andrew Silver
- The Return (2003 film), a Russian film directed by Andrey Zvyagintsev
- Wide Awake (2007 film), a South Korean film also known as Return
- Return (2010 film), a short film directed by Harri J. Rantala
- Return (2011 film), an independent film directed by Liza Johnson
- The Return (2024 film), a drama film by Uberto Pasolini, based on Homer's Odyssey

=== Literature ===
- Nostoi (Greek: Νόστοι, Nostoi, "Returns"), a lost epic in ancient Greek literature, thought to have been completed in the sixth or seventh century BC
- Return, a 1997 novel by Al Sarrantonio, the first installment in the Five Worlds trilogy
- Return, a 2003 novel by Karen Kingsbury with Gary Smalley, the third installment in the Redemption series
- A Return (Spanish: El regreso), a 2005 novel by Alberto Manguel
- Return, a 2010 novella by Peter S. Beagle
- Return, a 2019 novel by Morgan Rice, the fourth installment in The Invasion Chronicles

=== Music ===
- Return (iKon album)
- Return (Jack DeJohnette album)
- Return (The Winans album), 1990
- Return, an album by David Rovics
- Return (band), a Norwegian 80s pop/rock band
- "Return", a song by OK Go from the 2002 album OK Go
- "Return", a song by Shed Seven from album Let It Ride
- "Return", a song by The Wedding from the 2008 EP The Sound, The Steel
- "Return", a single by Natalie Hemby from Puxico (album) (2017)
- Returns (album), a 2009 album by Return to Forever
- Return (EP), a 2011 EP by F.T. Island

=== Television ===
- "Return" (Law & Order), 2000
- "Return" (The Secret Circle), 2012
- "Return" (Succession), 2019
- "Returns" (Slow Horses), 2024
- The Returns, a 2009 ballet by William Forsythe
- Return (TV series), a 2018 South Korean TV series
- Return (Polish TV series) a 2022 Polish TV series

== People ==
- Return J. Meigs Sr. (1740–1823), American Revolutionary War officer, federal Indian agent
- Return J. Meigs Jr. (1764–1825), Governor of Ohio, U.S. Postmaster General
- Return Torrey (1835–1893), American politician

== Other uses ==
- Election returns, denoting the resulting tallies of election ballots
- Return Point, Antarctica
- In gridiron football (American or Canadian), "return" can refer to either:

- Kickoff return
- Punt return

- Nostoi ("Returns"), a lost ancient Greek epic

== See also ==
- Abnormal return, the difference in behaviour between one stock and the overall stock market
- Diminishing returns, referring to a decrease of efficiency with scaling
- Return channel
- The Return (disambiguation)
- The Returned (disambiguation)
- Returner (disambiguation)
- The Returning, a 1990 Australia-New Zealand horror film
