= Farther Along =

Farther Along may refer to:

- Farther Along (novel), a 2008 novel by Donald Harington
- Farther Along (The Byrds album), 1971
- Farther Along, a 1988 compilation album by The Flying Burrito Brothers
- Farther Along (Spirit album), 1976
- "Farther Along" (song), a 1911 Southern Gospel song
