= Future Games (Spirit album) =

Studio album by Spirit
- Released: April 1977
- Studio: Studios 70, Tampa
- Genre: Psychedelia; rock; pop; collage
- Length: 43:38
- Label: Mercury
- Producer: Dr. Sardonicus

Spirit chronology
Farther Along (1976)	Future Games (1977)	...Potato Land (1981)

Singles from Future Games
- 1. "All Along the Watchtower" Released: May 1977

Future Games (subtitled A Magical-Kahauna Dream) is the ninth studio album by American rock band Spirit. Released in April 1977, it was their final album for Mercury Records and the last of their four "comeback" releases of the mid-1970s. It is essentially a solo project for frontman Randy California, who recorded it with drummer Ed Cassidy, though he later expressed dissatisfaction with the recording.

An album of psychedelic, rock and pop music, Future Games features 22 short tracks and is characterised by its textural guitar work, disorientating sound, fizzy production, concise melodies, use of sound collage and dialogue samples from American television, film and radio – in particular, the science fiction series Star Trek and the episode "Turnabout Intruder". The record reflects California's interests in science fiction, Hawaii and The Urantia Book; among its songs are two collaborations with Kim Fowley and a cover of Bob Dylan's "All Along the Watchtower", which was released as a single.

Housed in a sleeve depicting a half-naked California pulling a macho guitar pose, the album was the follow-up to the commercially unsuccessful Farther Along (1976). Future Games was similarly unsuccessful and did not chart in either the UK or the US. Music critics have drawn attention to the record's eccentric content and conceptual focus. It has since been cited as an early example of a 'collage-pop' album due to its heavy dependence on samples.

== Background and recording ==
Future Games (subtitled A Magical-Kahauna Dream) was the final of four Spirit albums released in the mid-1970s that, according to journalist Max Bell, cemented frontman Randy California's reputation as "one of the strangest dudes on the planet", following Spirit of '76 (1975), Son of Spirit (1976) and a reunion for the band's original lineup, Farther Along (1976). These releases marked Spirit's "comeback" following their success in the late 1960s and the shelving of the ill-fated Potato Land project earlier in the 1970s; according to Paul Lester, the rapid succession of these four albums over two years was "to the astonishment of their small but fanatical following." Spirit of '76, Farther Along and Future Games have also been described as California's trilogy of "Time Coast" recordings, released at a time when he eschewed the more hedonistic elements of his lifestyle for a fitness regime.

As Farther Along had been a commercial failure, Future Games was crafted in part as a response. The album is effectively a solo project by California, recorded at Studios 70, Tampa, in a manner likened by critic Steve Burgess of Dark Star magazine to "sitting at home with a console." The record features California's stepfather Ed Cassidy on drums, while Dr. Demento was on hand as an extra presence during the sessions. "Dr. Sardonicus" is credited as producer. According to Phil McMullen, California had been "germinating, hatching and sifting" over the record since his April 1973 sojourn in Hawaii, where he subsequently moved to. The musician later expressed dissatisfaction with the album, telling an interviewer in June 1978 that he had not listened to it "for a long time". He added "there was a certain point I reached, while making that album, where I felt that there was a real cosmic type of all-involved great sound to it and then I changed it, y'know, 'cause people were telling me not to do this or not to do that – there were a lot of influences in it..." The record was mastered by Wally Traugott.

== Composition ==
=== Musical style and themes ===
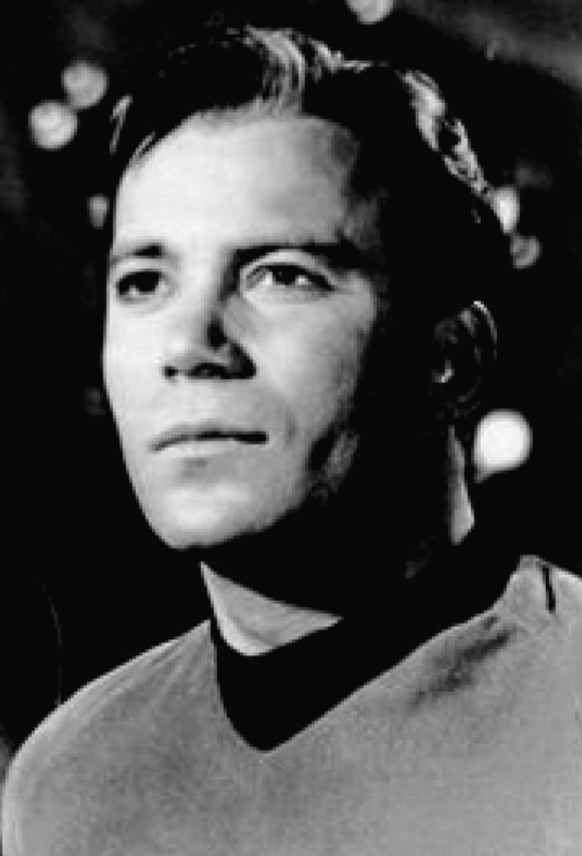
Captain Kirk from Star Trek, whose dialogue is sampled on the album.

A psychedelic album, Future Games features 22 tracks or "song-bites", some as brief as 14 seconds and none no longer than four minutes. The songs are characterised by concise melodies and California's "fizzy, trebly production", with swirling sounds obscuring the music and the consistent use of garbled, distorted vocals. The album's disorientating sound is heightened by the use of sampled dialogue from pop culture detritus, including excerpts of conversation from citizens band radio, 'wireless' script and synchronised snatches of American television and movies, such as taped snippets from Star Trek, which break up the record's melodies. Dark Star characterises the album as "a kaleidoscopic starburst of space music, tone colours, acid whimsy, sound collage and multi-textural guitar rock", while critic Max Bell calls it a conceptually confusing album which blends Spirit's "Hendrix meets Zappa" elements into "22 tracks of interwoven dementia".

California's interests in science fiction and Hawaii are present on the album, which is partly based on The Urantia Book (1955), a tome which contends that Earth's true name is Urantia and that "the planet is part of a larger galactic federation called Uversa." Lester wrote that California used science fiction "as a means to express his own altered state" and that the use of such themes was well-timed, as the record's release coincided with that of Star Wars and the then-current public demand for "all things interstellar". He also contends that despite being "weird", the "bright and buoyant" album appeared on paper to be a commercial project, due to it being "a series of infectious pop songs" interlaced with snippets from Star Trek, at the time "the world's biggest TV sci-fi show". Overall, Lester describes the record as "pretty druggy, steeped in FX and episodes of Star Trek," noting the heavy amount of sonic trickery but with California's pop sensibilities intact.

=== Songs ===
The album opens with "CB Talk", which features music from a car radio. On "Kahauna Dream", California plays what Bell describes as a "chain of sinuous notes around a framework of bubbling percussion and somnambulant singing." Two collaborations with Kim Fowley, "Buried in My Brain" and "Bionic Unit", are split by a Dr. Demento dialogue sample. "So Happy Now" is a very short song with Beach Boys-style vocals and has been compared to "throwaway moments of bliss" from that group's "Magic Transistor Radio" (1973); it is followed by Spirit's heavy version of Bob Dylan's "All Along the Watchtower", a less faithful cover than California's earlier interpretations of "Hey Joe" and "The Times They Are a-Changin'". Preceded by connecting sound effects, the recording shows the musician moving into "his Jimi Hendrix mode" with expressive guitar lines, but is considered to be uncommercial, as with the following song "Would You Believe?", whose intro features unsettling reverbed voices phased between left and right speakers in a manner comparable to Throbbing Gristle.

Excerpts from Star Trek, especially the body swap-themed episode "Turnabout Intruder", are interspersed heavily throughout the album's second side, although Paramount did not take legal action. "Star Trek Dreaming", "Interlude XM" and "The Romulan Experience" feature the characters of Bones and Captain Kirk. Written by Cassidy, "China Doll" is relatively straightforward, while "Detroit City" is a tribute to Cobo Hall. "Freakout Frog", which has drawn comparison to Richard Meltzer, samples Kermit the Frog of the Muppets and features a "zonked lyric" working incongruently against the riff, while "Monkey See Monkey Do" uses Ronettes-style echo and back-up vocals from Kaptain Kopter and Terry Anderson. According to critic Joe Viglione, it is "a fusion of nutiness and pop that sounds inspired by drugs and a Dr. Demento programme". The final track, "The Journey of Nomad", is a protest song about the Cold War and was co-written by California with Tom Hall.

== Release and promotion ==
Future Games was released in April 1977 by Mercury Records; it was Spirit's final album for the label. The sleeve was designed by Joe Kotleba with photography from Hauser and D'Orio; on the front cover, California is photographed naked from the waist up, pulling a macho guitar pose that has been compared to Ted Nugent, while on the back cover, he is depicted half-naked in what Viglione calls "a blatant and egotistical move, almost claiming that he is Spirit." As Viglion highlights, the back cover also gives "thank you" messages to Dr. Demento and Anderson, but not to Gene Roddenberry. Future Games was commercially unsuccessful, failing to chart in either the US or UK. In May 1977, "All Along the Watchtower" was released as a single with "Further Along" as its B-side; this also failed to chart. Following the album's release, Spirit headlined a tour of the United Kingdom, with the Police as support. In August 1977, the original Spirit line-up reunited for a one-off concert which ended acrimoniously when Neil Young, who joined the band for their encore of "Like a Rolling Stone", was knocked off stage by California.

== Critical reception ==
Professional ratings
Review scores
Source	Rating
AllMusic	2/5 stars
The Encyclopedia of Popular Music	3/5 stars
The Great Rock Discography	4/10
The Rolling Stone Album Guide	1/5 stars

In a contemporary review for New Musical Express, Bell deemed Future Games to be Spirit's weirdest and most impenetrable release, featuring "a myriad of sound, effect and stone beauty in composition" that almost result in a 1970s equivalent to Hendrix's Electric Ladyland (1968). He wrote that, unlike the "flashbacks" that constitute the previous two Spirit albums, Future Games is "solid window pane" that openly disregards standard rock techniques, which is why listeners do not "decipher the solos" or follow Cassidy's drumming, and concluded that: "Hearing is believing that Randy California has tripped out on his own genius. Again. If I had my way I'd make you buy this record." Walrus reviewed the album in their section on LPs they consider to "have an extra edge" and commented: "Making it with minimums is a high art. Randy California has developed the ability to suspend sound portraits across a wall using lovely melodies and marvelous images. He creates his own space, he is very conceptual."

Less favorably, Dave Marsh of Rolling Stone opined that Future Games deserved to be the "last freakout" by the "noble post-psychedelic" band and added: "The way some of these aging hippies hang around, it's not hard to see why they believe in reincarnation". Carol Clerk of the Gazette and Post stated that while Spirit were among the late 1960s' most important and innovative groups, they had become "a parody of their former selves", criticizing them for wasting their talents by delving deeper into psychedelia, a style she deemed to have "long gone", instead of "moving ahead and making what would probably be a worthwhile contribution to contemporary music." Clerk believed "nostalgic hippies" would prefer Steve Hillage and dismissed the album for resembling what "the BBC sound effects department might dream up to accompany a film or play about the old days in Haight-Ashbury."

In a retrospective review for AllMusic, Viglione wrote that although, as with California's best work, the album contains "flashes of inspiration and brilliance", such as the title track, overall it was a "good, but not great record". He believed that removing the Star Trek samples would have led to "a collector's item" of more interest. Reviewing it for the "hidden treasures" column in The Guardian, Lester called it "a masterpiece" that, despite its "canny appreciation of the late-1970s zeitgeist", failed to grip the public. He opined that "Monkey See Monkey Do", "China Doll" and "Freakout Frog" resemble "Top 10 smashes in that alternative reality where Todd Rundgren was a True Star, although only a madman, or a genius, would throw away a melody as sublime as 'So Happy Now' in a quarter of a minute. Still, that's probably why California was never that popular – more of a delusional populist. It also explains why Future Games still sounds like the future, 36 years on."

== Legacy ==
Lester states that as Future Games is composed of television and film samples, it is arguably "the first collage-pop album", predating Brian Eno and David Byrne's My Life in the Bush of Ghosts (1981). He also contends that, as an early 1977 release, Future Games "now seems incredibly punk", citing its short songs, succinct melodies, do-it-yourself ethos and extremely applied "notions of individualism and non-conformity", likening it sound to a fusion of the Ramones with the "spaced-out freakiness" of the Grateful Dead. In Uncut, he had drawn attention to California's "liquid fretwork" and described the album as "a masterpiece of sci-fidelia, The Prisoner on plastic". Phil McMullen of Ptolemaic Terrascope considers Future Games to be a "masterpiece" and "near-solo conceptual kaleidoscope", and argues that it matches Spirit of '76 as one of California's finest albums, while Steve Burgess of Dark Star has called it a "radical album by anyone's standards". Ian MacDonald cites Future Games as the zany album that completes Spirit's mid-70s oeuvre and calls it "a genially impenetrable jeu d'esprit harking back to Spirit of 76 in its loose, freeflowing, impressionistic ethos."

== Track listing ==
All songs written by Randy California except where noted.

Side one
No.	Title	Writer(s)	Length
1.	"CB Talk"		0:42
2.	"Stars Are Love"		2:29
3.	"Kahauna Dream"		2:44
4.	"Buried in My Brain"	California, Fowley, Blair Mooney, Carla Savage	2:55
5.	"Bionic Unit"	California, Fowley, Mooney	2:52
6.	"So Happy Now"		0:19
7.	"All Along the Watchtower"	Bob Dylan	4:27
8.	"Would You Believe"		3:13
9.	"Jack Bond Speaks"	California, Burt Shonberg	1:17

Side two
No.	Title	Writer(s)	Length
10.	"Star Trek Dreaming"		2:16
11.	"Interlude XM"		0:26
12.	"China Doll"	California, Cassidy	2:00
13.	"Hawaiian Times"		0:10
14.	"Gorn Attack"	Timothy Blanton, California	2:10
15.	"Interlude 2001"		0:25
16.	"Detroit City"	California, Cassidy	3:55
17.	"Freakout Frog"	California, Cassidy	1:57
18.	"The Romulan Experience"		0:57
19.	"Monkey See, Monkey Do"		1:39
20.	"Mt. Olympus"		0:25
21.	"The Journey of Nomad"	California, Tom Hall	2:30
22.	"Ending"		3:50

== Personnel ==
Adapted from the liner notes of Future Games

- Randy California – guitar, vocals, bass, engineer
- Ed Cassidy – drums, percussion
- Joe Kotleba – synthesizer
- Terry Anderson – backing vocals ("Monkey See Monkey Do")
- Blair Mooney – engineer
- Jim Schubert – art direction
- Hauser and D'Orio – photography
- Wally Traugott – mastering
