= Reign of Steel =

- GURPS Reign of Steel a role-playing sourcebook introduced in 1997
- A Reign of Steel a novel introduced in 2014
