= Andrew Silver =

Andrew Silver may refer to:

- Andrew Silver (producer) (born 1942), film director, writer and producer
- Andrew Silver (speedway rider) (born 1967), former international motorcycle speedway rider
- Casey Silver, real name Andrew Silver
