= Returner (disambiguation) =

Returner may refer to:

- Returner, a 2002 Japanese science fiction film
- Kick returner, a gridiron football position
- "Returner" (Gang of Youths song), 2022
- "Returner (Yami no Shūen)", a single released by Gackt in 2007
- The Returner (album), an album released by Allison Russell in 2023

== See also ==
- Return (disambiguation)
- The Return (disambiguation)
- The Returned (disambiguation)
- The Returning, a 1990 Australia-New Zealand horror film
