= The Returned =

The Returned may refer to:

== Films ==
- The Returned (2004 film), a 2004 French horror film
- The Returned (2013 film), a 2013 Spanish-Canadian zombie film

== Literature ==
- The Returned (novel), a 2013 novel by American author Jason Mott

== Television ==
- Les Revenants (TV series), a 2012 French supernatural drama television series based on the 2004 film
- The Returned (U.S. TV series), a 2015 remake of the French TV series
- "The Returned", an episode of the U.S. TV series Resurrection, based on Mott's novel

== See also ==
- Return (disambiguation)
- Returner (disambiguation)
- The Return (disambiguation)
- The Returning, a 1990 Australia-New Zealand horror film
