= With =

With is a preposition in English.

With or WITH may also refer to:

== Arts and media ==
=== Radio stations ===
- WITH (FM), a radio station (90.1 FM) licensed to Ithaca, New York, United States
- WFOA, a radio station (1230 AM) licensed to Baltimore, Maryland, United States, which used the call sign WITH from 1941 until 2006
- WZFT, a radio station (104.3 FM) licensed to Baltimore, Maryland, United States, which used the call sign WITH-FM from 1949 until 1974

=== Other uses in arts and media ===
- With (character), a character in D. N. Angel
- With (novel), a novel by Donald Harrington
- With (album), a 2014 album by TVXQ
- With (EP), a 2021 EP by Nam Woo-hyun

== Other uses ==
- with, a Python keyword; see dispose pattern
- Carl Johannes With (1877–1923), Danish doctor and arachnologist
- Woodlands Integrated Transport Hub, a bus interchange located in Woodlands, Singapore
