= Stay More: The World of Donald Harington =

- Directed by: Brian Walter
- Production company: Brian Walter Productions
- Release date: November 25, 2013
- Running time: 95 minutes
- Country: United States
- Language: English

Stay More: The World of Donald Harington is a 2013 documentary film about author Donald Harington, produced by Brian Walter. It is based on interviews that Walter conducted with Harington and his wife in 2006–07.

== Synopsis ==
In this documentary, Donald Harington defines the background of Stay More, the fictional Ozark village where Harington's novels are based. Harington shares his childhood memories of the small town of Drakes Creek (the town that was the model for Stay More) and looked back on his uneasy relationships with his parents and the upsetting loss of his hearing at the age of 12. Harington reflects on the dubious delights of getting his initial novels into print, with their sales on no occasion matching the favorable notices, blending these stories with the humorous perceptions on the writer's life (particularly the writerly penchant for liquor, religion, and sex). What emerges is a bittersweet portrait of an inspired but haunted artist, a writer genuinely rooted in American folk traditions whose triumphs seem always to be matched by deep disappointments, a novelist who not only blends comic relief into his tragedies but poignant "tragic relief" into his comedies.
