= Some Other Place. The Right Place. =

1973 novel by Donald Harington

First edition (publ. Little, Brown)

Some Other Place. The Right Place. is a novel by Donald Harington which was published in 1973. It is a story about growing up and understanding how the world works. There are many aspects to life and all must be realized before true growth occurs.

The book was adapted into the film Return in 1985.

== Plot overview ==
Diana Stoving seeks out Day Whittacker, the 18-year-old boy whose English teacher claims through hypnotism and age regression is Diana's dead grandfather Daniel Lyam Montross. Diana and Day travel together in search of the truth behind the hypnotism and Daniel's life. Intermixed with finding truth are unforeseen romances and events leading Diana and Day to unimaginable truths.

=== Extended plot ===
Overture

Diana and Susan are driving when they hit a pot hole and must stop at a dealership. While there, Diana reads an article about age regression and decides to meet the teacher hypnotist that the article is about. After Susan leaves, Diana poses as a reporter and meets Mr. Sedgely who tells her about Day Whittacker after she shows interest in the boy claiming to be Daniel Lyam Montross. Diana goes to the Whittacker house and poses as a Life magazine researcher. As Diana leaves, Day rushes out and asks for the truth. A few days after Diana's visit, Day disappears.

Diana and Day go to Mr. Sedgely's house so Diana can see Day hypnotized. Mr. Sedgely enables Diana to put Day into a hypnotized state by saying, “Go to sleep.” Day cannot remember anything that happens under hypnosis. The next day Diana and Day leave for Connecticut and Diana puts Day to sleep, but cannot figure out how to wake him up. As such, Day finally awakes disoriented and wanting to go back home. Eventually, the two arrive at Cornwall and are searching for Dudleytown in heavy rain. Day asks Miss Evans how to reach Dudleytown and she tells them of a road. The car gets stuck and Diana and Day must continue on foot. They find some cellar holes and Day builds a fire after the rain stops. They travel in the wrong direction and find shelter under a boulder. Diana hypnotizes Day and has “Daniel” lead her to his house.

When Day awakens, they find the car and stay at the McDonough Motor Lodge where they learn the legend of Dudleytown and eat. That night, the two decide to stick together because neither has anything to believe in and they talk throughout the night. When Diana wakes up the next day, she thinks she is dreaming. She buys camping gear and finds Day hitchhiking when she returns because he thought that she left him. The two then set up camp and find a waterfall while hiking. Diana quickly skinny-dips but feels someone watching. However, Day is cooking dinner when she returns and they relax.

First Movement: Landscape with Two Figures

The first chapter goes into the past from Daniel's perspective at his birth. He was unwanted and just another mouth to feed. With Diana and Day, it is the next day and Diana goes shopping while Day digs. He gets put into a hypnotic state to determine what he dug up. During this time, both Diana and Day doubt the existence of Daniel. Going back to Daniel, his childhood was filled with a sickly mother and a severe father; at one point Daniel tried to avoid punishment by jumping out of a tree. Luckily, the tree saved him from falling to his death.

During Diana and Day's time together, Diana has been recording Daniel's life and keeping a journal. As Daniel gets older, he learns about the truth behind babies and gets teased for not having a girlfriend until Hattie Rose Pearl says that she will be his and brings him candy. Diana realizes the attraction between her and Day, but does not want to be the first to act and actually avoids him.

Daniel joins the Oatsowers' Club and loses his virginity at age 11 to his cousin Violate. Diana makes a list of what she wishes to accomplish with Day, they dance, and Day finally listens to the recordings of Daniel. In the next section, the life of Diana and Day and Daniel combines. Diana and Day have sex while Daniel attempts to sleep with Hattie. At the point where Daniel is about to, Diana puts Day to sleep and has sex with Daniel. Later, Diana believes she's fallen in love with Daniel and she does not want to give Day attention. With Daniel, his parents actually found him and Hattie together and his mother demands that Daniel be punished. In actuality, Daniel's father is proud and only pretends to whoop Daniel.

At this time, people are leaving Dudleytown and Violate decides that she wants Daniel, cheating on her boyfriend Renz. As Diana is out driving, she runs into an old man and asks him questions about the people that used to live in Dudleytown. Diana tries and fails to correlate the information from the old man and Daniel. Day tells Diana that no matter what happens, he loves her. Daniel narrates within the story of Diana and Day, saying that he loves Diana, but cannot be with her; therefore, he is giving her Day. Day courts Diana with singing and poem recitations and Diana dances.

In Daniel's life, most of his family has left, except for his parents, his feeble-minded sister, and him. Daniel and Charity, his sister, perform sexual acts, eventually leading to sex. Charity becomes pregnant and leaves with her mother. Daniel learns of the family curse and his father is killed. He buries him alone and then his sick mother arrives. Seven guests arrive at Diana and Day's camp demanding food and drink before they go skinny-dipping at the waterfall. Marijuana gets passed around after the swim. Daniel must take care of his mother, when he suddenly remembers Diana and when he opens his eyes he thinks Zephaniah is Renz. Daniel describes when he tried to kill Renz. Diana's perspective is given about their seven guests. She wants them to leave, but they will not. She thinks Day is sleeping with Vashti, but she already slept with Zephaniah and cannot say anything. Zephaniah borrows Diana's car with the promise that he and his friends will leave as soon as he returns.

Jeeps arrive with men that want to scare everyone away, but also have sex with the girls. One of the men, George, attempts to go after one of the girls and Day attacks him. Eventually, everyone fought and ran away. Diana and Day hide out under the boulder until everyone is gone. Daniel sends his mother back to Illinois and leaves Dudleytown and heads to Vermont. Diana and Day leave Dudleytown on foot to follow Daniel's path to Vermont as fall begins.

Second Movement: “The Unfinished”

Day and Diana travel to Five Corners, Vermont. Day lied to Diana because he told her he'd never heard of Dudleytown or Five Corners, when he actually has. Day wonders if he made Diana up when they finally reach Five Corners. As Daniel's story continues, it is found out that he became a mail carrier, but he lost his job after staying at the celebration too long. However, he becomes a school teacher and stays with bachelor Jake Claghorn.

Day and Diana use Daniel's memories to learn how to do things such as make hard apple cider. While drunk, Day and Diana read each other's diaries and quarrel the next day. While Daniel is school teacher, he becomes closer to Rachel and she tells him her story of going off with a man. Daniel meets Henry Fox and learns life lessons. Rachel and Daniel continue their sexual relationship until Rachel's mother catches them and blackmails Daniel into a sexual relationship with her.

The question of an IT gets asked and Diana wonders if she has one, meaning a personal identity. Day bakes Diana a cake and makes her a necklace for her birthday, but she pouts about not getting what she wants so she hypnotizes Day and gets Daniel to giver her what she wants. Day and Daniel dance in the snow. Rachel catches Daniel and her mother together. Daniel continues teaching and works as a farmhand for Jirah Allen during the summer. Daniel stays with Rachel's family during the next school year and lives in the shed. Rachel began acting crazy that summer.

Day turns 19 and Diana does nothing, but Daniel speaks to Day's subconscious. Diana tells Day about her life and then leaves to clear up the cemetery. When Diana fails to return, Day searches for her and she has been shot. Day carries her to a farmhouse and wakes up at the hospital. When both are healed, they return to Five Corners because Diana says there is unfinished business. Day tries to become intimate with Diana, but gets stopped. Day summarizes Daniel's last few years at Five Corners where he worked as a carpenter, was briefly engaged with Rachel, and protected Henry Fox. Day suspects that Diana is in love with Daniel and he tells Diana of his childhood. That night, Day takes Diana while she sleeps.

In Henry Fox's last tape, Daniel asks what love is. He finds out the Rachel is Henry Fox's daughter and that love requires two people to be willing to share everything and see each other as they really are. Daniel kills Marshall Allen the next day and leaves Five Corners. Day and Diana fight, resulting in Day attempting to hang himself from a tree.

Third Movement: There and Here

Poems telling the story of Lost Cove. Diana and Day travel south and are oblivious about their love towards each other. They must cross a ravine and find a deserted town with buildings still standing. When Daniel first arrives at Lost Cove, he sees three girls washing, one of which ends up as his future lover. Daniel is neither loved or hated in Lost Cove, but his carpentry skills allowed him peace to stay there. No one particularly liked Daniel and he was often made fun of for his name and accent. Daniel got sick, but was healed by Aunt Billie Ledyard. Daniel tries to befriend her husband, but gets turned away.

Diana and Day are unused to being alone without the woods. They have difficulty building a fire, when the ghost of Flossie arrives. Day runs away and Diana gets told not to put her monthly rags in the fire, in which Diana informs the spirit that she is pregnant. Flossie gets angry because Diana and Day are unmarried. However, Flossie teaches them how to survive but meddles, so they beg Daniel to get rid of her. Daniel gets her to leave, but return for Christmas. Diana refuses to listen to Day and buys Christmas decorations and gifts, which depresses Day. Still, he searches for mistletoe for Diana.

Daniel is still considered a stranger at Lost Cove at Christmas, but he leaves wooden toys for all the children in the hope of being accepted. He forgot about Amney and begs forgiveness. Diana and Day miss Flossie, but have furnished the house with furniture from other abandoned homes. They work on their lives together. Diana still struggles with knowing who she is. Flossie arrives and is unwelcomed until Diana and Day experience cabin fever. Then, they listen to all of Flossie's stories until she eventually tells the tale of Dan Montross.

The Ghost's Song and Other Selected Poems

Flossie sets the mood for her tale and uses sticks to represent aspects of Dan's life. The first is the carpenter, The second stick is Dan's rifle gun because he was an impressive shot. The third stick is simply wood for the fires Dan watched when he made moonshine for bartering purposes. The fourth stick represents a hitching post because Dan got a black hose named Henry. The fifth and sixth sticks are Dan's fiddle and bow that he taught himself to play. The seventh stick stands for a 3D image contraption that Dan traded for. The eighth stick represents the law coming for Dan. Flossie, then ninth stick, hides him and his horse. Frankie, Flossie's daughter, is the tenth stick that Dan and his best friend Swinn, the eleventh stick, fought over. The twelfth stick is Dan's motto, “Speak softly and carry a big stick.” Flossie does not explicitly explain the thirteenth stick, only that it caused at least half his trouble and half his pleasure.

Dan stayed in Lost Cove until he was almost 30. Flossie drops the sticks and tells them to pick one to hear a story. Day picks up the sixth stick, the bow, and Flossie says Dan turns from the fiddlers on stage to a girl listening, but watching Dan. He catches her gaze and is enthralled. He asks her to dance and they dance into the night. This girl is 16 and Dan walks her home, he tries to kiss her, but she disappears. As he returns home, Ammey reappears, silent, but takes his arm. The walk back together and Dan rambles trying to get her to talk. She kisses him to silence him. They have sex, but Dan is drunk and clumsy and enters the wrong place. Diana is excited to hear about her grandma, but Ammey has yet to speak a word. When Dan asks questions in regards to their actions, she simply replies, “no.” So, Dan focuses on the sensations.

Diana and Day decide to emulate the situation. Diana and Day reemerge and Flossie declares that Day will play the fiddle, Diana dance, and she will sing while Dan calls out his story. Ammey was basically used as a prostitute by her father to get food and bartering goods. Dan begs her to leave with him, but she is obedient to her father. As such, she gets sold to Walt Ailing as his wife, but she and Dan stay intimate resulting in her becoming pregnant. Ammey dies during childbirth and Dan spends month at her grave, drunk and mourning. Dan and Ailing have a gun duel, then Dan steals baby Annie and leaves.

Diana apologizes to Day for what she said a long time ago: that he couldn't tell Dan's story. A fire breaks out while they sleep. The section ends with a poem that presents the idea that dreams are made by creating a future while asleep.

Fourth Movement: A Dream of a Small but Unlost Town

This entire section is narrated by Dan, the spirit. “G” is shown with all his faults and told that he must take a paid leave of absence. After seeing his doctor, “G” gets put on bed rest and told that he needs to change his habits. “G” is unmoved and is listless, until he decides to follow his estranged wife and daughters to Arkansas. He spends time with his daughters and reads an article about the missing Diana Stoving. He meets with Mr. and Mrs. Stoving and gets hired to find their daughter.

After the meeting, “G” visits Susan and finds out that Diana read an article at the dealership. “G” searches for which paper was there at the time and searches for a shocking article that could change Diana's plans with Susan. He finds the article about age regression and visits Mr. Sedgely and Day's parents. However, “G” does not understand where Daniel Lyam Montross comes into the picture. He searches Dudleytown and researches Montross in the library. During his stay, he hears what happened during Diana and Day's last night in Dudleytown. Continuing his search, he travels to Five Corners and believes Day hung himself from the evidence left. He visits the clinic for his own ailments and finds out about Day's desire to travel south.

To recover, “G” returns home for a while. To keep busy, he writes to southern states about ghost towns and learns of Lost Cove in North Carolina. Additionally, he learns that a house recently burned down in Lost Cove and “G” believes Diana has already left. He believes that she has most likely returned to Arkansas so he travels to “Stick Around,” which is actually still inhabited on the outskirts and finds Daniel's house. When he arrives, the house shows signs of people living there, but no one is home. Diana sneaks up on him while in the garden and knows him as an author. As such, Diana tells “G” her and Day's story. After meeting Diana, “G” sends a telegram to Diana's father for her maternal grandfather's name and buys a rifle. “G” thinks Diana is delusional about Day still being alive, but plays along. Diana and “G” listen to Henry Fox's final tape and Diana allows “G” to read her diary. In order to prove Day is dead, “G” sets up a trap at the post office where Diana and Day send each other letters. “G” thinks Diana planted Day's tablets in the post office, but reads them while spying on the post office. “G” believes Day actually died and when he questions Diana, she says that he tried, but failed and that the last pages are written by her because he was in no condition to write. Later, “G” reads the poems and thinks Diana made up the parts about Day and the ghost. However, when “G” rereads the poems, he does not believe Diana would have been able to write them. The next day, Diana does not receive a letter form Day and “G” sees it as her transitioning to believing that he no longer exists. Continually, “G” asks for proof that Day exists. Diana shows “G” the “Stick Around” tapes and all the stories of the town. That night, she shows him the writing on the wall and holds him as he sleeps. “G” dreams about his childhood and remembers Daniel Montross. “G” had actually lived in “Stick Around” during his childhood. Diana explains how the writings of Daniel were done for her and they go to the post office. Once there, “G” takes the letter and runs, but has a heart attack. As a result, Diana decides to make “G” healthier and forces him to exercise.

During this time, Daniel is watching Diana and “G,” as well as explaining how he raised Annie. When Annie went off with Burton Stoving, she was already pregnant and she and Daniel had a deal that he would get the child. However, she refused once she realized that Burton was sterile. Daniel kidnapped Diana; he is her father. Day meets Diana and “G” at the pond and they go back to the house to tell the final part of the story. “G” flashes back to his childhood encounter with Daniel when he was five. Daniel told him a story about searching for love and shows him a fork in the path, one path leading to town and the other to some other place. Now, “G” has found love in Diana, but it is not his so he must keep searching. “G” asks how Day got past his trap and finds out that there is a back to the counter. “G” reads the article about Daniel's shooting and Diana explains what really happened. “G” goes with Diana and Day to act out Daniel's final moments. When Daniel died, toddler Diana held him and looked into his eyes until the end.

Finale

“G” writes a letter to Diana's father. It states that Diana is alive and well, but it is up to her to decide to contact him. Diana writes “G” a letter. She tells him that she's happy he has returned home to his family and that he is taking better care of his health. She also told him to title their story Some Other Place, The Right Place.

== Characters ==
=== Major characters ===
- Diana Stoving – 21, dance graduate of Sarah Lawrence, from Arkansas, likes iced coffee, granddaughter of Daniel Lyam Montross, smokes, libra, rich, parents are Burton Aruther and Annette M. Stoving, once interested in astrology, quits smoking after being with Day for a few months, becomes pregnant with Day's child
- Charles “Day” Whittacker – tall, Eagle Scout, in church choir, thin, 18, dislikes smoking, wants to go into forestry, lonely, loves Diana, love not returned at first, prefers nature and hiking, father beat him with his belt
- Daniel Lyam Montross – talks through hypnotized Day, stays in Dudleytown to care for mom, likes girl named Violate Parmenter, thinks he killed Ferrenzo Allyn, has relations with Violate, Rachel, Melissa, and Ammey, he is actually Diana's father, not just her grandfather
- Melissa McLowery – wife to Joel McLowery, has daughter, auburn hair, under 40, overweight, loves dancing, lusts after Daniel, forces him into a sexual relationship when she finds out about him and Rachel
- Rachel McLowery – 16, red hair, Daniel's oldest student, she brings Daniel lunch and presents, ran away 2 years previously with a man, starts an affair with Daniel, eventually goes crazy
- Henry Fox – born in 1849, in Zurich, Switzerland, never met his father, mother moved to England then America, learned gold mining in South America (Argentina), came to Five Corners looking for gold (as an assayer), wise, large vocabulary, one Melissa McLowery's lover
- Investigator – “G,” hired by Mr. Stoving, has a hearing aid, tenured teacher, smokes and drinks too much, chronic suicidal thoughts, wife and children left him, begins to have feelings for Diana as he searches for her

=== Minor characters ===
Overture

- Susan Trombley – 22, friend of Diana, printmaking graduate of Sarah Lawrence, looking for a good time, from Ardmore, Pennsylvania, ended up working as typist in a Philadelphia law firm
- Patricia Klumpe – reporter of article
- Price Delmer “Del” Sedgely – English teacher, hypnotist, middle-aged, graying, glasses, thin, considers himself a scientist, does not believe in reincarnation
- Mrs. Whittacker – Day's mom, flighty, late thirties, talks in questioning tones
- Miss Mary Elizabeth Evans – old lady Day asks about Dudleytown
- Manager at Llewellyn's Sporting Goods – gets Diana to buy unnecessary supplies

First Movement

- Hopestill Montross – Daniel's mother, does not greatly care for Daniel at birth
- Clen Montross – Daniel's Daddy-pa, religious, makes a living as a charcoal burner.
- Ethan Montross – oldest son of Montross family
- Nathan Montross – brother to Daniel
- Nicholas Montross – brother to Daniel
- Emmeline Montross: moved away from Dudleytown, lives in Midwest
- Charity Montross – youngest sister, 20 months older than Daniel, feeble-minded, became

pregnant by Daniel, sent away to Emmeline

- Hattie Rose Pearl Bardwell – Daniel's classmate, 2 years older than Daniel, considers herself his girl, father owns general store
- Oatsowers Club members: Zadock, Seth, Jonathon, Renz
- Violate Parmenter – Daniel's cousin, she primed him and went further, Ferrenzo Allyn's girl
- Ferrenzo Allyn – killed Daniel's father
- Rebekah – red hair, part of traveling group
- Zaphania – formerly called Mu from The Grape Group, part of traveling religious zealot group
- Esaias – The Flake, from The Grape Group, part of traveling religious zealot group
- Barnabas – picked up from Massachusetts, part of traveling religious zealot group
- Bathsheba – larger blonde, part of traveling religious zealot group
- Zeresh – lighter, smaller blonde, part of traveling religious zealot group
- Vashti – brunette, part of traveling religious zealot group
- Felix Spofford – from West Cornwall, 39, truckdriver, volunteer fireman

Second Movement

- Judge Braddock—does bidding for who keeps schoolmaster
- Mrs. Peary – born in Five Corners, 88, has pictures of Five Corners
- Jirah and Livia Allen – have a 200-acre farm, son named Marshall
- Jake Claghorn – bachelor, 3 room shack, stocks wood for schoolhouse
- Joel McLowery – has biggest sheep herd in county
- Adelphia and Aaron Tindall – blood relations to judge, Aaron is a drunk
- Matthew and Sophronica Earle – townspeople, Matt is former schoolmaster, they have 2 children
- Marshall Allen – son to Jirah Allen, little mental capacity, sadistic, regularly rapes his sister, tortures pets and livestock, gets lashings every day, starts an animalistic sexual affair with Rachel
- Dr. Fox – Day's doctor, has a lot in common with Day, lies to Day's father, offers to give a ride back to Five Corners to Day and Diana

Third Movement

- Flossie – ghost in Lost Cove, tells Daniel's story

Fourth Movement

- Mr. Stoving – firm, dominant, favors alcohol
- Anne Stoving – wife of Mr. Stoving, daughter of Daniel, fragile, blond hair, hazel

eyes, submissive, loves to read

== Elements ==
- Poetry – entire section of novel filled with poems; tells stories through segments
- Ghost villages – no place is the right place, there are always other places; analogy to abandoned places within the mind
- Age regression/reincarnation – ideas live on; Daniel could not rest until he passed his knowledge on to his daughter/granddaughter
- Incest – boundaries are threatened, Daniel is unconventional and shows a unique moral perspective
- IT - a person's identity, his sense of self and subconscious desires, love results only after completely sharing a couple's ITs

== Reception ==
“Sensual, evocative, clever and very original…the senses reel from a mass of powerful description.” – The Irish Times

“There is much to admire here – structure, characterization, tonal and thematic complexity, evidence of hard and fruitful labor – all tempered with healthy dollops of self-mockery.” – The New York Times

“A highly original novel, intriguing both sexually and intellectually, and very well written.” – Publishers Weekly
