= Ekaterina (novel) =

1993 novel by Donald Harington

- First edition
- Author: Donald Harington
- Language: English
- Genre: Romance novel
- Published: 1993
- Publisher: Harcourt
- Publication place: American
- Awards: International IMPAC Dublin Literary Award
- ISBN: 015128122X

Ekaterina is a 1993 novel by Donald Harington.

== Plot ==
Ekaterina is an exiled Svanetian princess who arrives at an unnamed city at the confluence of the Allegheny and Monongahela, Pittsburgh. There, she gets a job teaching an introductory mycology class at a university. Meanwhile, she rents a room from a woman, Loretta, who lives there with her twelve-year-old son, Kenny, who immediately takes a precocious liking to her. She befriends the 12-year-old boy called Kenny who reminds her of two young pubertal boys she had relationships with in Russia, Islamber and Dzhordzha. Harington describes the attractive boy as a faunlet, a male counterpart to Vladimir Nabokov's nymphet in Lolita.

After two months, the 27-year-old Ekaterina seduces Kenny and they have sex. During the course of their sexual relationship, Kenny, already a juvenile delinquent, steals contraceptives to avoid pregnancy. When Kenny confesses his sexual relationship with Ekaterina after being caught stealing car parts, his mother forces Ekaterina to leave. She settles in a town called Stick Around where she befriends a woman named Sharon, who indirectly introduces her to a boy named Jason. Later, she engages Jason on his twelfth birthday by giving him an all-over massage in the bath while baby-sitting him.

With the help of a novelist and improbable creative writing teacher named Ingraham, Ekaterina matures as a writer, eventually publishing not only a successful autobiography, Louder, Engram! (invoking Nabokov's revised autobiography, Speak, Memory), but also several works of fiction, one of which, a novel called Georgie Boy, becomes a bestseller, allowing her to move from "Stick Around," this novel's disguise for Stay More, the primal setting for all of Harington's novels except his first, The Cherry Pit, to a hotel in Arcaty, the novel's counterpart to the real Arkansas Ozarks town of Eureka Springs. In Arcaty, she meets young Travis Coe, another twelve-year-old boy, who moves into her luxurious penthouse apartment as her houseboy. After getting the lice out of his hair, Ekaterina invites Travis into her bed – just twelve days after they meet. Travis turns out to be a considerably more complex presence than his new employer has anticipated, and the relationship does not last. Ekaterina discovers that Travis was not a virgin and kicks him out, becoming obsessed with how he lost his virginity. Travis does go on to star in Hollywood's screen adaptation of Georgie Boy. Ekaterina also benefits by turning her investigation of the girl to whom Travis lost his virginity into a series of short stories that propel her fame further by being published in Playboy magazine.

Ekaterina's relationships with pubescent boys constitute only one facet of this character's ingeniously layered life-story. Donald Harington’s writing is sometimes described as magic realism, but that term hardly begins to suggest the narrative pyrotechnics of Ekaterina, which the author has aptly described as not so much a tribute to Nabokov's Lolita as an apotheosis of it.

== Reception ==
The book was reviewed by several news sources such as the Los Angeles Times, Orlando Sentinel, The Washington Post and The New York Times Kirkus Reviews said of the book: "Grand entertainment from an author who's been too little known for too long: perhaps this zany homage to Nabokov (especially Lolita) will bring deserved attention to Harrington (sic)'s impressive body of work" while Publishers Weekly said: "Ekaterina is an acknowledged homage to Nabokov, particularly to Lolita, and if it misses some of the Russian master's literary playfulness, it has many charms of its own...". Novelist D. M. Thomas at the Los Angeles Times also called the book "Superbly crafted, foxy, engaging, funny, joyous".

Ekaterina also won a 1996 International Dublin Literary Award.
