= Next Door (1975 film) =

1975 film by Andrew Silver

- Directed by: Andrew Silver
- Written by: Andrew Silver
- Story by: Kurt Vonnegut
- Starring: Matthew Bradley; Paul Guilfoyle
- Release date: 1975

Next Door is a short 1975 film written and directed by Andrew Silver. The 24-minute black-and-white film starred Matthew Bradley and Paul Guilfoyle. Kurt Vonnegut is also credited with writing the story.

== Cast ==
- Matthew Bradley
- Paul Guilfoyle
- Gene Lasko
- Lee Perkins as Kid
- Lisa Blake Richards
- Bronia Wheeler
