= A Quest of Heroes =

2013 young adult novel by Morgan Rice

- Author: Morgan Rice
- Genre: Teen fantasy fiction
- Publication date: 2013
- Pages: 280
- ISBN: 978-1-939416-20-9

A Quest of Heroes is a 2013 young adult fantasy fiction book by Morgan Rice.

The book follows Thor, a 14-year-old boy as he joins a military force and explores his own magical powers.

The author's first book, it received reviews with both positive and critical elements.

== Publication ==
A Quest of Heroes was self-published in 2013 by Morgan Rice. It was her first book and part of The Sorcerer's Ring group of books.

== Synopsis ==
A Quest of Heroes features protagonist Thor a 14-year-old boy and the youngest son of a shepherd and his quest to join the Silver Legion royal military force. After joining as an apprentice fighter, he excels in his abilities before discovering his magical powers.

== Critical reception ==
Caryn Shaffer, writing in San Francisco Book Review describe the book as formulaic and was critical of the author's creativity, character development and prose. Despite the criticism Shaffer enjoyed the book, noted it was the author's first, and spoke of the author's potential as: "the beginnings of something remarkable are there if she chooses to hone her skill and come up with a more original story."

Publishers Weekly described the character development as rushed, book as "action-packed" and Rice's writing as "solid".

Kirkus Reviews described the book as "fun but anemic."

In 2013, the book was the 11th most popular teen book sold via Amazon, one of three books by Rice in Amazon's top 20 for that year.
