= The Architecture of the Arkansas Ozarks =

1975 novel by Donald Harington

First edition (publ.Little, Brown)

The Architecture of the Arkansas Ozarks (TAOTAO) is a 1975 novel by American author Donald Harington. TAOTAO is an epic tale that follows six generations of "Stay Morons", beginning with its first settlers Jacob and Noah Ingledew, who travel from their native Tennessee to the Ozark region of Arkansas to found the imaginative town of Stay More. There are twenty chapters in TAOTAO, each chapter opening with a pencil sketch of a building that the story builds upon. The illustrations are by Harington.

== Plot ==
The first chapter begins with a sketch of a rounded, bigeminal house. While in the Ozark region of Arkansas, the shy Jacob Ingledew meets the native Indian Fanshaw, who lives in the bigeminal house. The pair of them become friends, and they spend time together philosophizing on matters including the existence of God or Wahkontah. They also debate on who deserves to stay in the town of Stay More. At one point Fanshaw tells Jacob to sleep with his wife, which leads to her impregnation. Then Fanshaw and his woman leave Stay More after revealing to Jacob that he impregnated Fanshaw's woman.

A clock peddler named Eli Willard, who passes by the town of Stay More sells a clock to Jacob and Noah Ingledew. Later, Noah contracts the frakes, a mysterious disease that causes the afflicted to lose interest and motivation in life. Jacob tries to cure Noah of his frakes with urine from a panther.

Lizzie Swain and her fourteen children settle near the Ingledew brothers into a home that Jacob helps build out of trees. Sarah Swain, one of Lizzie Swain's daughters, marries Jacob. The newlywed couple move into their own bigeminal house, which Jacob also builds himself. But then a string of unfortunate events occur; Jacob contracts the frakes and the people of Stay More suffer through a drought. When rain finally arrives, it floods.

A woman by the name of Viridiana Boatright sleeps with most of the men in Stay More. The men of Stay More contract the frakes and they suspect Viridiana gave them the frakes. Jacob becomes the governor of Arkansas, and Sarah the First Lady. The people of Stay More, also called Stay Morons, establish a post office so Eli Willard can communicate with its residents. Lum sets up a general merchandise store in Stay More too. The clock peddler Eli Willard struggles to sell his grooming aids to the Stay Morons, despite how idiotic he thinks them to be. Soon the aged Jacob passes away, and his wife Sarah dies the next day.

Around the early 1900s Willis Ingledew buys a Ford Model T. Jealous of his brother’s new car, John decides to build a bank so that he can later take money from the bank to pay for his own Model Ford T. Around the same time a constitutional amendment is added that bans the sale and possession of alcoholic drinks.

When the 1920s roll around, Eli Willard, now the oldest man alive, still tries to sell goods to the Stay Morons. He presents Hank with his gold chronometer to pass down to Hank’s future son. Hank impregnates a woman named Sonora, whom he then marries. Then he joins the U.S. Navy during World War II. Hank and Sonora wish to name their baby after the clock peddler who game them his gold chronometer, but by the time they conceive a boy they forget about Eli Wiillard and, instead, name their boy Vernon. Like most of the men in Stay More who contracted the frakes, Vernon too gets the frakes, but the narrator of TAOTAO informs its readers that Vernon will eventually find a cure for the frakes.

After digging around his yard, Hank finds the golden chronometer for Vernon. Once Vernon wears the watch from Eli Willard he becomes aware of the reader and the narrator of the story. The narrator tells Vernon to catch a razorback. While in pursuit of catching the razorback boar, Vernon breaks his watch, so he takes it to a clock repairman who offers to buy the watch. But Vernon declines his offer. By the end of the story Vernon and Jelena Duckworth become a couple who will live in a domicile built by Vernon. The narrator will visit them and try to persuade Vernon to provide a better resting place for Eli Willard.

== Reception ==
The year it was published, the American Library Association listed it as one of the ten best novels of the year. It was reviewed by Kirkus, Bookletter, The Atlantic, Library Journal, Booklist, and the Courier-Journal and Times.

The Library Journal said: "Harington has succeeded in creating one of the finest novels in recent years. It is myth; it is tall tale; it is bawdy story; it is Americana; it is literature."

"You don't have to be from Arkansas to appreciate this robust and rollicking novel...folklore and history mix generously throughout...a rich and rewarding novel." - Columbus Dispatch

"Harington is well-known in the Ozarks for his novels that are set in Newton County, Arkansas, around the community he called Staymore. The quality of Harington's fiction seems erratic to me, except that it is always endearing and often hilarious. He created characters who settled Staymore, or were born there, leaving and returning, over the last few hundred years. One branch of my ancestry, led by Ezekiel and Talitha Shaddox, homesteaded in Newton County in the 1850s, just below Pruitt, where Mill Creek spills into the Buffalo River. Harington's ability to evoke what Newton County was like in times past adds color and detail to my own mental pictures of the lives and surroundings of my forebears." - Newstex LLC
