= The Pitcher Shower =

2005 novel by Donald Harington

- Cover of first edition
- Author: Donald Harington
- Cover artist: Wendell Minor
- Language: English
- Series: Stay More cycle
- Genre: Literary fiction
- Publisher: The Toby Press
- Publication date: 2005
- Publication place: United States
- Media type: Print (hardback & paperback)
- Pages: 202 pp
- ISBN: 1-59264-123-7

The Pitcher Shower (2005) is a novel by Donald Harington set in the Arkansas part of the Ozarks in fictional towns near the fictional town of Stay More, the setting for Harington's other novels. The main character drives from town to town showing movies or "pitchers" (so he is a "pitcher shower") on improvised screens outdoors.

== Summary ==
Landon "Hoppy" Boyd shows two Western movies (made in 1937) in a small town. After he leaves, he finds that a teenager named Carl has stowed away in his truck. Hoppy takes a liking to Carl and breaks his usual rule of returning stowaways to their homes. Carl is a helpful partner on the trip and in the next town (and a skilled barber), despite his habit of wandering at night in the woods, where he converses with fairies. He proves to be a seventeen-year-old girl, Sharline Whitlow.

In the following town, Hoppy and Sharline meet Emmett Binns, an itinerant evangelist who had once tried to molest Sharline. Sharline and Hoppy begin a sexual relationship. Despite tension with Binns, Hoppy treats him to some moonshine whiskey and shows Binns his pornographic movie, and later that night Binns is arrested for assaulting an underage girl.

In the next town, Hoppy finds that his movies are missing. He blames Binns and starts a search with the cooperation of his handsome and charming friend Arlis Faught. Hoppy buys the only movie he can: the 1935 version of A Midsummer Night's Dream. The film fascinates Arlis and Sharline. The next day Hoppy happens to see Arlis and Sharline having sex in the woods.

Later, while Arlis and Sharline are together, Arlis's frustrated girlfriend Helen Milsap visits Hoppy. They share moonshine that Hoppy got from a "puckish" man named Goodfeller. They fall for each other but are interrupted during fellatio by Arlis and Sharline. As the projector's sound is broken, that night the four show A Midsummer Night's Dream reading the parts themselves. Having recognized the parallels to their situation, Hoppy plays Lysander (and Bottom), Arlis plays Demetrius, Sharline plays Hermia, and Helen plays Helena, in addition to other roles for each. The fairies Sharline sees now appear to the four "voice actors" and the audience.

At midnight, after the movie, they hear that Binns has been sighted. Hoppy chases his car but cannot find him. The next day Arlis and Helen leave for California. Hoppy and Sharline find Binns's car in a ravine. Sharline climbs down to it; Binns is not in it, and she recovers the missing films and a good deal of money.

An epilogue describes what happens to the characters during the next few decades, with reference to Harington's previous and planned novels (referred to as "movies"). Hoppy and Sharline buy a movie theater and Sharline opens a barbershop; their son (possibly Arlis's) grows up in both places.

== Style ==
The narrator, never identified, sometimes uses rural Arkansas dialect and sometimes "more proper and distant" language.

The narration repeatedly mentions that the story is in black and white.

== Major characters ==
- Landon Boyd is a twenty-six-year-old projectionist from Stay More, Arkansas, who also entertains his audiences with juggling and magic tricks. He is nicknamed Hoppy as he shows Hopalong Cassidy movies and shares the surname of William Boyd, who played Hopalong. He is not a fluent talker and often hates himself, especially for his sexual inadequacy.
- Sharline Whitlow is a girl from a small town. She is skilled (at least by local standards) at cutting hair, playing the piano, cooking, and telling stories, and she quickly learns to juggle (with balls or chiffon scarves) and repair machinery. As she does not get along with her mother, she runs away, disguised as a boy. Initially sexually ignorant, she learns eagerly and helps Hoppy overcome his sexual problems.
- Arlis Faught owns the general store in another town. He is the same age as Hoppy and looks similar, but "sightlier", with courtly manners and more education. He and Hoppy are friends until his desire for Sharline briefly comes between them.
- Helen Milsap teaches seventh and eighth grades. She is a beautiful young woman and Arlis's lover until Arlis briefly abandons her for Sharline.
- Emmett Binns is a hypocritical traveling preacher.

== Reception ==
One review called The Pitcher Shower "charming" and "low-key", mentioning "gentle irony" and "whimsical characters". Another called it "tasty" and "a meditation on faith and belief, and on dreams". The Arkansas Democrat Gazette said the novel was "lyrical", with little suspense or tension. It particularly praised the scene where Helen visits Hoppy and the one where the four main characters watch A Midsummer Night's Dream for the first time and talk in Shakespearean style. The New Yorker compared Harington to William Faulkner and Tom Robbins (as "almost every female in the novel verges on nymphomania") and preferred where the story "just jiggle[s] along" to where Harington attempts "meaning".
