= Radio Cape Cod =

- Film poster
- Directed by: Andrew Silver
- Written by: Marta Rainer
- Produced by: Andrew Silver
- Starring: Tamzin Outhwaite; O. T. Fagbenle; Tamzin Merchant
- Cinematography: Michael Spindler
- Edited by: Thomas Casaretto
- Music by: R. Berred Ouellette
- Release date: January 18, 2008
- Country: United States

Radio Cape Cod is a 2008 film directed and produced by Andrew Silver. It stars Tamzin Outhwaite as a radio interviewer coming to terms with the loss of her husband and a new love entering her life. She also must cope with her teenage daughter, played by Tamzin Merchant, who is experiencing her first love. The film also stars O. T. Fagbenle. The film won several festival awards.

== Plot ==
The main character, Jill Waters, is an NPR radio show host who also performs wedding nuptials. The story involves three couples in love, and a wedding that takes place over a five-day period in the seaside community of Cape Cod. The film explores the joys and challenges of motherhood with new beginnings, life and love.

== Critical reception ==
Reviews

Susan Waugh, reviewing for STLBeacon.org writes, "Radio Cape Cod is a triple love story set on the beaches of Cape Cod, Massachusetts. With gorgeous scenery and beautiful people, it's as relaxing and refreshing as a day on the beach - and uplifting to boot."

Awards

- Best Feature Film - Wellfleet Harbor Actors Theater, Wellfleet, MA
- Best Cinematography - 2008 All American Film Festival, Durham, NC
- Best Cinematography - 2008 Schweitzer Lakedance Film Festival, Sandpoint, ID
- Best International Feature Film - 2008 End of the Pier International Film Festival, Sussex, England
- Best Actress Tamzin Outhwaite - 2008 End of the Pier International Film Festival, Sussex, England
