= Thirteen Albatrosses (or, Falling off the Mountain) =

2006 novel by Donald Harington

Editing Thirteen Albatrosses (or, Falling off the Mountain)
- Cover of first edition
- Author: Donald Harington
- Language: English
- Series: Stay More cycle
- Genre: Literary fiction
- Publisher: The Toby Press
- Publication date: September 2006
- Publication place: United States
- Media type: Print (hardback & paperback)
- Pages: 400 pp
- ISBN: 1-59264-168-7

Thirteen Albatrosses (or Falling off a Mountain) is an American novel written by Donald Harington that was published in 2002.

== Plot ==
Vernon Ingledew decides to run for the governor's seat, although he has no political experience, but he is the great-grandson of Jacob Ingledew, who used to be the governor of Arkansas during Reconstruction. Vernon's best friend, Day, and Day's wife, Diana, discuss with Don and Kim that they had already expected Vernon to run for the governor's seat.

Vernon is a genius and has a self-enriching program that he uses to learn new things. He spends a year learning everything there is to know about two subjects, starting at the beginning of the alphabet. He gets to "P", and alphabetically, after philosophy comes politics, so he decides that the best way to learn politics is to become a politician.

== Characters ==
- Vernon Ingledew – running for the governor's seat, atheist, never attended college, lives in sin with his first cousin, Jelena, displays a hysterically cryptic vocabulary.
- Jelena Ingledew - Vernon's first cousin and “living partner”
- Day Whittacker – Vernon's best friend
- Diana Whittacker – Day's wife

== Reception ==
"Harington is the greatest writer living in America. This book resonates…" - Peter Straub

"Wild, weird, and wonderful." - Kirkus

"...uneven and somewhat disappointing..." - Publishers Weekly
