= Collaboration (What We Do in the Shadows) =

- What We Do in the Shadows episode
- Episode no.: Season 2 Episode 8
- Directed by: Yana Gorskaya
- Written by: Sam Johnson and Chris Marcil
- Cinematography by: DJ Stipsen
- Editing by: Antonia de Barros; Dane McMaster
- Production code: XWS02008
- Original air date: May 27, 2020
- Running time: 22 minutes

Guest appearances
- Greta Lee as Celeste; Jack O'Connell as Benjy Everett

Episode chronology
← Previous "The Return"	Next → "Witches"

"Collaboration" is the eighth episode of the second season of the American mockumentary comedy horror television series What We Do in the Shadows, set in the franchise of the same name. It is the eighteenth overall episode of the series and was written by Sam Johnson and Chris Marcil, and directed by Yana Gorskaya. It was released on FX on May 27, 2020.

The series is set in Staten Island, New York City. Like the 2014 film, the series follows the lives of vampires in the city. These consist of three vampires, Nandor, Laszlo, and Nadja. They live alongside Colin Robinson, an energy vampire; and Guillermo, Nandor's familiar. The series explores the absurdity and misfortunes experienced by the vampires. In the episode, Guillermo quits his position as familiar after not feeling appreciated, while Laszlo discovers a song he wrote has been plagiarized.

According to Nielsen Media Research, the episode was seen by an estimated 0.443 million household viewers and gained a 0.17 ratings share among adults aged 18–49. The episode received positive reviews from critics, who praised the humor, musical numbers and Guillermo's storyline. The episode was nominated for Outstanding Writing for a Comedy Series at the 72nd Primetime Emmy Awards.

== Plot ==
While attacking a jogger, Laszlo (Matt Berry) overhears a passing car with "Come On Eileen" playing in the radio. He tells the vampires that he composed the song in 1852, along with "For He's a Jolly Good Fellow". The vampires are also visited by Benjy Everett (Jack O'Connell), who is a familiar of Nandor (Kayvan Novak) and will be turned into a vampire, frustrating Guillermo (Harvey Guillén).

Guillermo accompanies Benjy to a familiars meeting, where he runs into an old friend, Celeste (Greta Lee). Celeste has been turned into a vampire, and she has decided to turn all her familiars within eight months to build a community. She offers him the same treatment, but he would need to stop serving Nandor. He confronts Nandor over his hesitation in making him a vampire, to which Nandor says he can leave and become a servant to Celeste. Guillermo quits his position and moves in with Celeste, who gives him better treatment than Nandor. Laszlo and Nadja (Natasia Demetriou) go to a comedy club to perform their songs, all of which are poorly received. However, they win the crowd with "The Seafaring Song", which is their version of "Kokomo". They finish their act by killing some of the crowd.

With Benjy not up to the tasks of a familiar, Nandor visits Guillermo, but he reiterates he is happy with his new environment. Nevertheless, Guillermo and other familiars start feeling frustrated that Celeste is not keeping her part of her agreement in turning them into vampires. Celeste is then called by her Master, revealing she is not a vampire. As the Master and her group attack the familiars, Guillermo flees. He is approached by Nandor, who expresses that he still wants him back. Guillermo accepts to return, but wants to feel respected and appreciated. Nandor agrees to his terms, promising that he will eventually turn him into a vampire. Later, they drop Benjy on a gas station, after having turned him into a vampire.

== Production ==
=== Development ===
In April 2020, FX confirmed that the eighth episode of the season would be titled "Collaboration", and that it would be written by Sam Johnson and Chris Marcil, and directed by Yana Gorskaya. This was Johnson's first writing credit, Marcil's first writing credit, and Gorskaya's second directing credit.

== Reception ==
=== Viewers ===
In its original American broadcast, "Collaboration" was seen by an estimated 0.443 million household viewers with a 0.17 in the 18-49 demographics. This means that 0.17 percent of all households with televisions watched the episode. This was a 17% increase in viewership from the previous episode, which was watched by 0.377 million household viewers with a 0.15 in the 18-49 demographics.

With DVR factored in, the episode was watched by 1.01 million viewers with a 0.5 in the 18-49 demographics.

=== Critical reviews ===
"Collaboration" received positive reviews from critics. Katie Rife of The A.V. Club gave the episode a "B+" grade and wrote, "This week's episode felt like a throwback to the first season of What We Do In The Shadows, both in its world-building and in its character work. A lot has changed for Guillermo since the season one finale, but his motivation to quit serving Nandor and move in with the flighty Celeste in 'Collaboration' was more like the Guillermo we met in the series premiere. In other words, given that Guillermo's character arc is now focused primarily on his destiny as a vampire hunter, the plot this week hinged on his desire to become a vampire, without any nods to these conflicting impulses. That made it feel a bit like an out-of-order track from an album being played on shuffle, a disorienting detail in an otherwise very sharp and silly episode."

Tony Sokol of Den of Geek gave the episode a 4 star rating out of 5 and wrote, "'Collaboration' is, ultimately, a very sweet episode, and not only because Nadja & Laszlo finish their performance with a killing spree, which occurs off camera. It also solidifies the relationship between Guillermo and Nandor, who reluctantly learns to appreciate and even reward his familiar." Greg Wheeler of The Review Geek gave the episode a 3.5 star rating out of 5 and wrote, "The series continues to deliver the goods comedy-wise though and the song about the Olympics along with the cat familiar are easily the strongest bits of comedy here. Although not quite as good as some of the other episodes on offer, Shadows continues to conjure up a decent slice of comedy."

=== Accolades ===
For the episode, Sam Johnson and Chris Marcil were nominated for Outstanding Writing for a Comedy Series at the 72nd Primetime Emmy Awards. They lost the award to Schitt's Creek for the episode "Happy Ending".
