= The Stranger (Once Upon a Time) =

- Once Upon a Time episode
- Episode no.: Season 1 Episode 20
- Directed by: Gwyneth Horder-Payton
- Written by: Ian B. Goldberg; Andrew Chambliss
- Original air date: April 29, 2012

Guest appearances
- Tony Amendola as Geppetto / Marco; Keegan Connor Tracy as The Blue Fairy; Jakob Davies as Pinocchio / Young August

Episode chronology
| ← Previous "The Return" | Next → "An Apple Red as Blood" |
- Once Upon a Time season 1

"The Stranger" is the 20th episode of the American fairy tale/drama television series Once Upon a Time, which aired in the United States on ABC on April 29, 2012.

The series takes place in the fictional seaside town of Storybrooke, Maine, in which the residents are actually characters from various fairy tales that were transported to the "real world" town by a powerful curse. In this outing, August Booth promises to show Emma Swan how she can defeat Regina Mills in order to gain custody of Henry. Also, Regina schemes to seduce David Nolan while Pinocchio's backstory is revealed, along with a series of events (which occurred before the Evil Queen enacted her curse) in which the woodcarver Geppetto agrees to a plan that will save Snow White's daughter, but with a proviso that could also save his son—which, in turn could affect the outcome in the present day.

It was co-written by Ian B. Goldberg and Andrew Chambliss, while Gwyneth Horder-Payton served as director.

== Title card ==
Jiminy Cricket flies through the Enchanted Forest.

== Plot ==
=== In the characters' past ===
In the Enchanted Forest, as Pinocchio (Jakob Davies) and Geppetto (Tony Amendola) fight the storm on the raft in the ocean, the whale that had swallowed them, Monstro, passes them and tilts their raft. In an effort to save each other, Geppetto tells him to take the life jacket, but Pinocchio refuses, jumps into the water, and tells Geppetto to save himself. The following morning, Geppetto washes up on shore and discovers that Pinocchio saved him as the lifeless puppet boy lies face-down in the water. As Geppetto weeps at the loss of his son, the Blue Fairy (Keegan Connor Tracy) appears, saying he can still save him and uses her wand to turn him into a real boy. As the Blue Fairy wishes them well and to live their lives as a family, she tells Pinocchio to remain brave, truthful and unselfish - so long as he does that, he will always remain a real boy. Days later, the Blue Fairy returns to tell Geppetto about the Evil Queen's (Lana Parrilla) curse as he is the only one who can help. She then takes Geppetto to the last enchanted tree in the realm, which if made into a wardrobe will protect the savior (referring to Emma) from the curse. However, when the Blue Fairy tells him the wardrobe will be built for only two people, Snow White, (Ginnifer Goodwin) still pregnant with her daughter, and Prince Charming, Geppetto refuses and tells her that he will only create the wardrobe if Pinocchio can go through, too. Jiminy (Raphael Sbarge) disagrees and argues, telling him that he cannot bargain with her, but Geppetto eventually wins the argument after reminding Jiminy that he has no right to tell him what to do after what Jiminy did that caused Geppetto's parents to be turned into dolls, when Geppetto was just a young boy. During the first meeting of the War Council, whose members include Snow White, Prince Charming, Red, Granny, and some others, the Blue Fairy lies to the council that there will be room for only one in the wardrobe as Geppetto looks down at Pinocchio with a caring look.

After Snow gives birth to Emma early, the Blue Fairy tells Geppetto that Pinocchio cannot go since Snow White should accompany her daughter. When Geppetto asks what will happen to Pinocchio, she tells him that there is no time for that. Before the Blue Fairy can tell Snow White she must leave as well, Geppetto prepares his son to go through anyway, telling him that sometimes people must lie to protect the ones they love. So Pinocchio goes into the wardrobe as Jiminy tells him that he will not fail as long as he remains brave, truthful and unselfish, while Geppetto tells him that he must rescue them and remind Emma to believe in her destiny when she turns 28, and looks to a tearful Pinocchio with pride, saying that he will be a great man. Geppetto then locks Pinocchio in the wardrobe, which shook violently. As he opens the wardrobe again, Pinocchio is gone. Pinocchio disappears into the present and emerges from a tree. He is frightened of an airplane that flies by, as he does not know what it is. Pinocchio tries to return through the hole of the tree where he had emerged, but a sudden force blew from the tree and knocked him to the ground. As he regains consciousness, the young boy suddenly sees a crying baby, Emma, inside the trunk of the tree he just came from and tries to calm her down. In a foster home in Boston, Pinocchio looks over baby Emma, trying to quiet her as she cries and he uses funny faces to successfully calm her down, but then is scolded by the man of the house for using the tools to reinforce Emma's crib. When one of the kids comes by with a wad of cash stolen from the sock drawer, he tells the other foster children that it is enough to buy bus tickets for everyone. But despite pleas from Pinocchio, Emma won't be able to come with them as the children won't be able to take care of a baby. As the child leaves, Pinocchio stops him, then apologizes to Emma and blows her a farewell kiss. He goes with the kids, leaving baby Emma behind.

=== In Storybrooke ===
In the present day, August (Eion Bailey) installs a medieval-like latch on the door of Mary Margaret (Goodwin) and Emma Swan's (Jennifer Morrison) apartment in order to keep Regina (Parrilla) from breaking in again with her set of skeleton keys. As Mary Margaret prepares to go back to work in the school, Emma asks her if they should worry about her going back to school so quickly, but Mary Margaret is concerned that Emma is the one to be worried about now that she hopes to get back custody of Henry (Jared S. Gilmore), and as Emma wants to hire Mr. Gold (Robert Carlyle) to help build a case against Regina. Henry later radios Emma about an Operation Cobra emergency and tells her to meet him at Granny's. August then follows Emma, telling her that a custody battle won't accomplish anything and she should look at the bigger picture in order to get rid of Regina. He tries to convince her to take the day off and take a leap of faith so he can show her how exactly to beat her, but she declines the offer. At Granny's, Henry informs Emma that someone changed the book which now features the story of Pinocchio, but left no ending to what happens afterwards, and since no one knows where the book is kept, they wonder how that is possible and realize there's more to the story than they think. Meanwhile, August sits in his room, looking at the red alpine hat Pinocchio wore as a child. Then he picks up the phone, he dials Mr. Gold and wants to meet with him concerning Emma. August then starts to fall as he leaves, showing his leg has turned into wood and proving his true identity is Pinocchio.

Elsewhere, Mary Margaret looks upon the school happily when Regina walks up to her and asks where Henry is, but Mary Margaret retaliates with anger. At the same time, she tells Regina that she forgives her and says that even though she put her through hell, she can still forgive her and that she believes Regina must be so lonely if her only happiness comes from making others miserable. After Mary Margaret leaves and Henry arrives, Regina tells him that she is going to transfer him out of Mary Margaret's class. Henry angrily lashes out at her, saying that she framed Mary Margaret, even though she protests. Regina asks Henry if he actually believes that she is capable of such deeds and Henry says yes. Henry goes on to tell her that he knows that she is the Evil Queen and that Snow White will have her happy ending with Prince Charming (Josh Dallas), finalizing his speech by declaring that good will win. Across town, August goes to Mr. Gold's shop, where Mr. Gold is talking with Marco (Amendola), whom August immediately recognizes as his father Geppetto, but does not say anything. When Mr. Gold questions why August doesn't say anything to him after Marco leaves, August tells him that it is his business then proceeds to tell him that Emma is too focused on getting custody of Henry and he needs Mr. Gold to push Emma towards him so that he can get her to believe in the curse. After Mr. Gold comments on his history, he tells August that he will give Emma a gentle nudge towards him. Moments later, Emma goes to see Mr. Gold about Regina, but he turns down her case, saying that he knows how to pick his battles but this will not be one of them. Emma walks out to go see August, and tells him that she is just about out of options. She then asks him to show her the big picture so she can beat Regina. As August and Emma ride out to the forest, Emma questions where they are going and he responds by telling her that they are going on a trip to tell her a story. When Emma asks him what story, August's response is "mine."

Hours later, David (Dallas) locks up the shelter when he sees Regina across the street struggling with her car, and he offers her a ride home. At first she refuses, but eventually accepts. When they arrive at her house, she offers for him to stay for dinner, but David declines, saying that he needs to be up early for work the next day. Regina then picks up a blank card claiming Henry has left a note saying that he is having dinner with Archie (Sbarge) after his session instead of coming home, so David decides to stay out of pity for the mayor. During their dinner together, David compliments her lasagna, and assists with dishes, while Regina thanks him for his kindness. As David thanks Regina for taking care of him, Regina in turn tells David the story of how she found him: After a night of work that was later than usual due to a misplaced phone, Regina found David on the side of the road, nearly frozen to death. After telling her story, Regina moves in to kiss David, but he rejects her, telling her things are great as is and thanks her again for dinner before leaving. Regina stares at the mirror in the hallway before smashing it by throwing her glass of wine at it, furious that her plan to seduce him failed.

Later that night, Emma and August ride to a diner on the side of a road. An angry Emma asks what they are doing there. August reveals to Emma that she's been there before and that it was the diner she was brought to when she was found. He continues by showing her the newspaper article of the 7-year-old boy that found her, adding that this is his story, and her story as well, as he was that 7-year-old boy. Emma questions why they are in the woods as August tells her that this is where he actually found her. Emma doesn't believe him, claiming she was found on the side of the road, but August shows her the tree where they both came into the world. He tells Emma that he found her in a blanket with her name embroidered on it. Because this was not mentioned in the article, Emma now believes that August is truly the boy who found her. As August tells her to believe that he is Pinocchio, Emma discovers that he was the one who edited Henry's book, and the book ends with her believing. However, Emma tells him that is not going to happen and that he is out of his mind. She takes off with August chasing after her, only to collapse to the ground in pain. August tells her he was on the other side of the Earth when he felt a shooting pain up his leg at 8:15AM (8:15PM in Storybrooke) which was when he realized Emma was staying in Storybrooke and is reminded of the promise he was supposed to keep. He then shows Emma his wooden leg to try to make her believe, but because she does not believe in magic, she sees a normal, human leg. August realizes that her denial is deeper than he thought and tells her that she still doesn't want to believe after everything that she has encountered in Storybrooke. After a brief exchange, Emma tells August that she doesn't want the responsibility because she cannot handle so much, but as August claims that she is their only hope and the whole town is depending on her to rescue them, Emma retorts saying, "Then you're all screwed."

After returning to Storybrooke, August walks past Marco's workshop, helping him with a clock that is jammed. August tells Marco that his father told him how to fix it when he was a child. Marco tells him his father would be proud, but August tells him that he has disappointed his father because he has not grown into the man his father would have hoped. Marco adds that if he is trying to fix the promise he broke as a child, then that would be good enough for him. August finally asks if Marco, despite not being able to pay him, would like to hire an assistant. He continues by saying that the payment would not matter because he feels like fixing things. Marco then brings him into his workshop. Meanwhile, Emma calls Henry via walkie-talkie to ask if he wants to leave Regina and stay with her. After Henry responds to Emma's answer that he wants to more than anything, Emma tells her son that they're leaving town immediately and proceeds to drive him from Regina's house with him in her car.

== Production ==
"The Stranger" was co-written by co-producers Andrew Chambliss and Ian B. Goldberg, while Sons of Anarchy veteran, Gwyneth Horder-Payton, directed the episode. The episode was included in Reawakened: A Once Upon a Time Tale – a novelization of the first season – which was published by Hyperion Books in 2013.

== Cultural references ==
A brief reference to Lost can be seen as Pinocchio looked up at an airplane that had the Oceanic Airlines logo on it after he stepped out of the tree. Another Disney related reference can be found in the storyline where August meets Emma for the first time as an infant, which parallels Sleeping Beauty, when seven-year-old Prince Phillip met the infant princess Aurora for the first time. And as in the story of Pinocchio, the titular character escapes the orphanage with another boy in the real world, who bears a resemblance to Lampwick, the boy who enticed Pinocchio to escape with him in the 1940s film. In August's case, he mentioned that he had returned from Phuket, a vacation resort island in Thailand that parallels Pinocchio and Lampwick's visit to Pleasure Island in the Disney film.

== Reception ==
=== Ratings ===
The episode posted a slight increase from the previous outing to a 3.0/9 among 18-49s with 9.20 million viewers tuning in, once again winning its timeslot for the third week in a row and giving ABC's Sunday night lineup a major win among 18-49s across the board.

In Canada, the episode finished in sixteenth place with an estimated 1.407 million viewers, a decrease from the 1.473 million of the previous episode.

=== Reviews ===
In a review from Entertainment Weekly, writer Hilary Busis noted that this installment was good and that it finally gave viewers the answer they been waiting for about August being revealed as Pinocchio, but adds that the surprise twists and reveals in this storyline needed more life, noting that the series "is normally so overstuffed that recapping any given episode can be a real challenge. But tonight's installment can be summed up with a few short sentences: August is Pinocchio -- commenters [referring to fans who had been posting their guesses on websites and message boards], give yourselves a pat on the collective back! -- as well as the boy who 'found' baby Emma after she traveled out of Fairy Land. Emma still refuses to believe in the curse. And Regina wants to seduce David, for some reason. That's ... basically it, excluding a truly frustrating concluding twist. When will Snow White's line learn that running away is almost guaranteed to make a problem worse?" Busis also went on to say, "It's a shame that there wasn't more to 'The Stranger,' especially considering we've only got two episodes left in Once's first season. I'd hoped that by this point, Emma would finally be able to get over her stubborn skepticism. Watching her refuse to believe even after she sees and experiences ridiculous things week after week has gotten as old as seeing Mary Margaret and David have that same 'We want to be together but we can't be together' conversation over and over."
