= Donald Harington (writer) =

American author and visual artist

- Born: December 22, 1935; Little Rock, Arkansas, U.S.
- Died: November 7, 2009 (aged 73); Springdale, Arkansas, U.S.
- Education: University of Arkansas; Boston University
- Writing career
- Language: English

Donald Douglas Harington (December 22, 1935 – November 7, 2009) was an American author and visual artist. All but the first of his novels either take place in or have an important connection to "Stay More", a fictional Ozark Mountains town based somewhat on Drakes Creek, Arkansas, where Harington spent summers as a child.

== Biography ==
Harington was born and raised in Little Rock, Arkansas. He lost nearly all of his hearing at age 12 due to meningitis. This did not prevent him from picking up and remembering the vocabulary and modes of expression among the Ozark denizens, nor in conducting his teaching career as an adult.

Though he intended to be a novelist from a very early age, his course of study and his teaching career were in art and art history. He taught art history in Millbrook, New York, Putney, Vermont, and South Dakota before returning to the University of Arkansas in Fayetteville, his alma mater, where he taught for 22 years before his retirement on May 1, 2008.

Entertainment Weekly called him "America's greatest unknown writer." The novelist and critic Fred Chappell said "Donald Harington isn't an unknown writer. He's an undiscovered continent." Novelist James Sallis wrote in The Boston Globe: "Harington's books are of a piece—the quirkiest, most original body of work in contemporary U.S. letters."

Harington died of pneumonia, after a long illness, in Springdale on November 7, 2009.

His novels are available from the Toby Press in a uniform edition, with cover illustrations by Wendell Minor.

A 2013 biopic of Harington titled Stay More: The World of Donald Harington was created by filmmaker Brian Walter based upon interviews with Harington and his wife during 2006–2007, which was released in 2013 and is distributed by the University of Arkansas Press.

== Novels ==
- The Cherry Pit (1965)
- Lightning Bug (1970)
- Some Other Place. The Right Place. (1972), adapted into the film Return in 1985
- The Architecture of the Arkansas Ozarks (1975)
- The Cockroaches of Stay More (1989)
- The Choiring of the Trees (1991)
- Ekaterina (1993)
- Butterfly Weed (1996)
- When Angels Rest (1998)
- Thirteen Albatrosses (or, Falling off the Mountain) (2002)
- With (2003)
- The Pitcher Shower (2005)
- Farther Along (2008)
- Enduring (2009)

== Nonfiction ==
- On a Clear Day: The Paintings of George Dombek, 1975-1994 (1995)
- Let Us Build Us a City: Eleven Lost Towns (1986)

== Awards ==
- Oxford American Lifetime Award for Contributions to Southern Literature, 2006
- Robert Penn Warren Award for Fiction, 2003
- Arkansas Writers Hall of Fame, 1996
- Porter Prize for Literary Excellence 1987
