= An Apple Red as Blood =

- Once Upon a Time episode
- Episode no.: Season 1 Episode 21
- Directed by: Milan Cheylov
- Written by: Jane Espenson; David H. Goodman
- Original air date: May 6, 2012

Guest appearances
- Lee Arenberg as Grumpy / Leroy; Alan Dale as King George; Meghan Ory as Red Riding Hood / Ruby; Sebastian Stan as Jefferson; Beverley Elliott as Granny; Keegan Connor Tracy as The Blue Fairy

Episode chronology
← Previous "The Stranger"	Next → "A Land Without Magic"
- Once Upon a Time season 1

"An Apple Red as Blood" is the 21st episode of the American fairy tale/drama television series Once Upon a Time, which aired in the United States on ABC on May 6, 2012.

The series takes place in the fictional seaside town of Storybrooke, Maine, in which the residents are actually characters from various fairy tales that were transported to the "real world" town by a powerful curse. In this outing, Henry attempts to convince Emma Swan to remain in Storybrooke and Regina Mills devises a master plan with Jefferson that will force Emma into leaving forever while the events surrounding Snow White's attempted rescue of Prince Charming are revealed along with her plan to enlist the aid of her allies and defeat the Evil Queen once and for all.

It was co-written by Jane Espenson and David H. Goodman, while Milan Cheylov served as director.

== Title card ==
Snow White and the Seven Dwarfs walk through the Enchanted Forest.

== Plot ==
=== In the characters' past ===
King George (Alan Dale) summons his prisoner, Prince Charming (Josh Dallas), with the intent of executing him as punishment for refusing to marry the daughter of King Midas and ruining their alliance because of love. Just as Prince Charming is about to lose his head (via guillotine), the Evil Queen (Lana Parrilla) arrives and stops the execution by turning the blade into water. She promises to give him the fortune he should've gotten from Midas in exchange for Prince Charming, intending to use him to destroy his true love : Snow White (Ginnifer Goodwin). King George agrees to this offer and releases Prince Charming.

Meanwhile, Snow White gathers allies consisting of Red Riding Hood (Meghan Ory), Granny (Beverley Elliott), and the dwarves in order to storm King George's castle after he captured Prince Charming. Red warns the group about the Queen and Granny tells them that there might be a trap in store for them while the rest of the group agree with her about the risks. Snow White, however, is determined and refuses to back down, offering her partners the chance to turn back and leave if they wish but no one does. Snow White explains the Queen's intentions, which is to take revenge on Snow White for taking away her happiness and wanting to do the same to her through Charming. As for Prince Charming, he is in his cell when the Queen visits him and taunts him, much to his anger. He even asks her to take his life instead of Snow's but she tells him that she will not take her life but instead inflict a much more satisfying punishment for her, showing off the poisoned apple meant for Snow as she leaves the cell in glee.

Snow White and her allies ready themselves for the attack on George's castle when they get a signal from Red who howls in her wolf form to notify them to start their plan. Snow White and the dwarves scale the wall while the fairies (who have been called upon by Grumpy for assistance) fly in to attack, led by the Blue Fairy (Keegan Connor Tracy). Snow White swiftly deals with the guards, helped by Grumpy (Lee Arenberg) and she and the others continue their battle against George's forces into the courtyard, successfully taking out many of them. Just as they are cornered by more of the king's guards, the fairies knock them out with their fairy dust.

Snow White rushes to Charming's cell, only to find that he is not really there and only an illusion conjured up in a mirror by Regina. He explains that the Evil Queen now has him taken as her prisoner, leaving Snow White discouraged while Charming is optimistic that they'll be together somehow. Just then, Regina appears in his place and mocks them. Snow White pleads with her to let him go as this fight is between them two, prompting the Queen to tell Snow White she wants to have a talk between them two only, asking her to meet up with her "where it all began" (By this she means the stables that appear in The Stable Boy which explores Regina and Snow White's backstory). Snow White disarms herself to go meet up with Regina, although her partners advise her against doing so. She wants to finally put an end to this feud before endangering anyone else.

In the stables, the Evil Queen sadly looks around the place when Snow White meets up with her and Regina leads her up a hill to Daniel's grave. Snow White believed that Daniel had run away and apologizes when she finds out that Daniel was killed by Cora after Snow told Cora about them. Snow White tries to reason with her that this battle has caused them both enough suffering and losses, including Snow White's father, but the Evil Queen refuses to listen. Regina gives Snow White an apple and makes a deal with her that if she eats the apple willingly, she will be entombed in her own body, but Charming will live. Snow White eats the apple, falls into a deep enchanted sleep and Charming feels her soul in his cell, crying out in desperation as he realizes Regina has done something to Snow. The Queen looks on happily at Snow White's unconscious body as the bitten apple rolls away into a mysterious portal.

Snow White's friends arrive later and find her unconscious. Her lack of breath leads them to believe that she is gone. The Queen joyfully watches Prince Charming suffer in his cell from her mirror in her room.

=== In Storybrooke ===
Regina Mills (Parrilla) has a nightmare in which her dinner with Henry (Jared S. Gilmore) is interrupted by Emma Swan (Jennifer Morrison) and other inhabitants of the town who have regained their memories of the Enchanted Forest and have come to her door seeking revenge with Henry being aware and complicit in this. They tie her to her apple tree and despite her pleas for them to stop, they refuse to listen and allow Emma to use a sword on Regina, prompting her to wake up. Meanwhile, Henry is trying to stop Emma from driving out of Storybrooke and even grabs the steering wheel, causing Emma to go into a ditch. He wants her to stay in Storybrooke with her family and break the curse.

Regina sees that her apple tree is dying and goes to Mr. Gold (Robert Carlyle). She calls him out for not caring that the curse is weakening and Mr. Gold tells her that to keep the curse going she'll have to give up Henry, although she strongly disagrees with this. Instead, Regina wants to kill Emma but Mr. Gold reveals that he designed the curse in a way so that killing the savior would break the curse by default and he can't cancel that loophole in this land because he has no magic. Regina becomes suspicious of his motives and realizes he is waiting for the curse to break although Mr. Gold refuses to explain why. Regina tries to strike one last deal with Mr. Gold, but he turns down the offer in disinterest and even advises her to leave town before the curse breaks and she has to face the wrath of her victims. With Mr. Gold being of no help, Regina turns to Jefferson (Sebastian Stan) for help and plants a white rabbit card on Paige's bike (Paige is Jefferson's daughter) to let him know she needs his help. As for Emma, she returns to her roommate Mary Margaret Blanchard (Goodwin) who is quite upset that Emma tried to leave without even saying goodbye and they have a heart-to-heart with each other with Mary Margaret telling Emma that although she doesn't want people relying on her, she needs to do what is best for Henry instead of running away and becoming who she was before she came to Storybrooke.

Jefferson meets up with the mayor at her office after getting the card she left for him, with both of them knowing he can't harm her or else he won't be reunited with his daughter. Regina hatches a plan: Jefferson will use his magical hat to help her with the obstacle in their way being the lack of magic to make the hat work. Regina then admits that there is still some magic left and that she plans to go back to the past in the Enchanted Forest to get an artifact that will rid the town of Emma. They adjust their deal so that instead of Regina waking Paige up to who she really is, she will erase both of their memories and rewrite their stories so that they can start afresh together but only after their plan to destroy Emma succeeds.

Henry goes to August Booth (Eion Bailey) to warn him that Emma wants to leave but August has already given up because he already tried to make her a believer and it failed, causing him to be turning back to wood as the consequence. Henry realizes that August is Pinocchio. August tells him that he is dying and that he just wants his father, leaving Henry to continue Operation Cobra on his own. Emma and Archie Hopper (Raphael Sbarge) are discussing Emma's custody case against Regina and how weak it actually is. Archie reasons with Emma that this ongoing conflict between Henry's mothers is affecting him most of all and that since she came to town, Henry has grown more rebellious and gotten himself into more trouble which doesn't put her in a good light. Emma thinks he is saying that Henry is better off with Regina but on the contrary Archie is saying that they should put their differences aside and call a truce.

Regina and Jefferson go into her vault with the only magic left being in her magical trinkets from the Enchanted Forest which the curse brought to Storybrooke with her. She throws away some artifacts in the hat to power it with magic but it doesn't work, sadly forcing an emotional Regina to part with the ring she got from her late lover Daniel from back in the Enchanted Forest. This causes the hat to be activated into a portal, although it is not big enough for them to be able to cross through and they can only come in mere contact with the fairy tale land. Regina directs the hat to the time and place to go to and reveals what to get from the Enchanted Forest to settle her problem: the poisoned apple (The same one she used on Snow White years ago). They manage to retrieve the bitten apple after it rolls away from an unconscious Snow White's hand and into the portal. Once she has the apple, Regina devises a plan to get Emma to eat it by baking it into a turnover. Emma comes to see Regina and takes Archie's advice by asking Regina to stop this conflict between them, recognizing that Henry is also her son. She offers a deal with Regina so that she will leave town if Regina will allow her to visit Henry and Regina accepts and gives her the laced turnover for her to enjoy on the road.

The two women part ways and Regina goes to see Mr. Gold and pridefully boasts about having found the solution but Mr. Gold warns her about the price of magic, although Regina does not listen and celebrates her victory. Henry goes to Emma and finds her packing. Not willing to fight Regina any longer, she explains she is leaving to avoid any one else getting hurt and will visit him from time to time. When Henry asks about the curse, Emma avoids the question and asks him to let go of his belief in fantasy and they have an emotional embrace. Henry then notices the turnover and when Emma tells him it's from his adoptive mother he tells her not to eat it because it's poisonous. Emma doesn't believe this because there would be no reason to get rid of her if she is already leaving to which Henry explains that Emma is still a threat. To prove he is right, Henry apologetically takes a bite of the turnover in Emma's place, collapsing and falling into the same sleeping curse as Snow White as Emma panics over his unconscious body.

== Production ==
"An Apple Red as Blood" was co-written by co-executive producer David H. Goodman and consulting producer Jane Espenson, while 24 veteran, Milan Cheylov, directed the hour. The episode was included in Reawakened: A Once Upon a Time Tale – a novelization of the first season – which was published by Hyperion Books in 2013.

== Reception ==
=== Ratings ===
The episode held steady from the previous outing to a 3.0/8 among 18-49s with 8.95 million viewers tuning in, once again winning its timeslot for the fourth week in a row, although The Amazing Race had more viewers that same hour.

In Canada, the episode finished in fourteenth place with an estimated 1.601 million viewers, an increase from the 1.407 million of the previous episode.

=== Reviews ===
In a review from Entertainment Weekly, writer Hilary Busis noted that this installment didn't have as much substance as the previous episodes, but was good enough to fill in the holes and compared the Enchanted Forest rescue scene to that of The Avengers.
