= Farther Along (Spirit album) =

Studio album by Spirit
- Released: June 1976
- Length: 31:05
- Label: Mercury
- Producer: Al Schmitt, Randy California

Spirit chronology
Son of Spirit (1975)	Farther Along (1976)	Future Games (1977)

Professional ratings
Review scores
Source	Rating
AllMusic	2/5 stars
Classic Rock	4/5 stars

Farther Along was the third album that Spirit released through Mercury Records, and their eighth album overall. Though Jay Ferguson was missing from the lineup, it is generally considered to be their first "reunion" album.

Out of the four albums that Spirit recorded for Mercury in the mid-70s, this one is the least influenced by Randy California's time in Hawaii. However, it isn't too dissimilar from the previous two albums in that regard, though the song structures are very tight throughout. Consequently, it also bears more than a passing resemblance to Clear at times, probably because of John Locke's presence in the group. It is particularly cherished by fans of that album. The album also includes a notable version of "Nature's Way", which is arranged for a chamber orchestra.

Though most of the album was issued on the Mercury Years compilation, much of the material included overdubs which were not part of the original recordings. The 2004 CD reissue of this album (as a two-fer with Son of Spirit) contains the original mixes.

== Track listing ==
All songs written by Randy California except noted.

No.	Title	Writer(s)	Length
1.	"Farther Along"	Andes, California, Cassidy	3:21
2.	"Atomic Boogie"	Andes, Andes, California, Cassidy, Locke	2:40
3.	"World Eat World Dog"	California, Cassidy, Locke	2:45
4.	"Stoney Night"		2:31
5.	"Pineapple"	Locke	2:12
6.	"Colossus"		2:57
7.	"Mega Star"	California, Locke	3:27
8.	"Phoebe"	Andes	2:10
9.	"Don't Lock Up Your Door"	Andes, California, Cassidy	3:10
10.	"Once With You"	California, Locke	1:33
11.	"Diamond Spirit"	Andes, California	2:25
12.	"Nature's Way"		2:04

== Personnel ==
=== Spirit ===
- Mark Andes – bass, vocals
- Randy California – bass, guitar, vocals
- Ed Cassidy – percussion, drums
- John Locke – keyboards
- Matt Andes – guitar, vocals

=== Additional musicians ===
- Ian Underwood – synthesizer
- Ernie Watts – saxophone
- Robert Lee – keyboards, vocals
- Michael Temple – mandolin
- Steve Larrence – percussion
- David Blumberg – horn
- Nick DeCaro – horn

=== Production ===
- Al Schmitt – producer
- Bob Hughes – engineer
- Jay Kauffman – engineer
- Marc Piscitelli – engineer
- Allen Sides – engineer

== Charts ==
Chart (1976)	Peak position
US Billboard 200	179
