= With (novel) =

2004 novel by Donald Harington

- Second edition (publ. Toby)
- Author: Donald Harington
- Language: English
- Publisher: Toby Press
- Publication place: United States

With is a novel by American author Donald Harington, first published in 2004 by Toby Press. The story takes place in Stay More, Harington's mythical town in Newton County, Arkansas. With is part love story and part survival story about a girl's development into a woman while living in isolation and seclusion from the rest of society.

== Plot ==
Part One: Parted With

A man named Sog Alan travels up and down Madewell Mountain with his dog Hreapha to get supplies at a store. While buying supplies for his so-called 'dream girl', Sog looks for a girl to abduct. He spots a beautiful, young girl who happens to be the daughter of Karen Kerr, a lady whom Sog had previously issued a speeding ticket to. After stalking Robin, Sog makes an attempt to abduct her. He knocks on Robin's front door, pretending to be her grandfather. Robin nearly falls for his tricks, but she does not open the door for Sog.

Eventually Sog successfully abducts Robin at a skating rink and takes her to an abandoned house at the top of Madewell Mountain. He offers Robin an assortment of presents. Then Robin asks Sog three questions; she asks him if he will take her home, why he picked her, and if he is going to rape her.

Part Two: Sleeping With

Robin's Grandfather Leo discovers Robin's disappearance. Police officers hold Leo captive as a suspect. Meanwhile, at Madewell Mountain Sog uses a flashlight as a makeshift nightlight for Robin. The next day Robin is gone. Robin tries to return to her family, but she fails to find her way out of the mountains. Sog finds Robin with Hreapha's help. All the while, Sog suffers from impotence and illness, thus preventing him from raping Robin. Robin begins to settle into her new surroundings in the mountains; she learns how to cook and clean. And she befriends Hreapha, a ghost of a boy named Adam Madewell, and other wild animals like beavers and even a bobcat. Robin's mother Karen makes an appearance on television to directly address Robin's abductor.

Part Three: Without

Ten years pass and Robin's parents have yet to reunite with their daughter. One day Sog wakes up without his usual body ailments, so he attempts to have intercourse with Robin, but Robin's animal friends retaliate, preventing Sog from getting what he wants. Later, Robin shoots Sog and kills him. With Sog gone, Robin grows closer to the in-habit Adam Madewell, but she does not try to return home to her parents. Instead, she remains with all of her animal companions at their house.

Part Four: Within

Robin does not hear the in-habit for a long time, so she is convinced that he is not a figment of her imagination. She asks Adam if he wants to sleep with her, but he does not reply until warmer weather arrives. Then Robin asks Adam the in-habit if he ever gets bored. He replies that he never gets bored because there is always something going on in the world. Hreapha gives Robin a pet snake for her birthday. Then she journeys to Stay More to see Yowrfrowr again with her children.

A drought occurs near the end of summer, so Robin struggles to keep herself clean and the chickens alive. Hrolf and the other animals set out to find a bear cub for Robin's twelfth birthday. They struggle to stay hydrated during their search. Robert finds a living bear cub within a cave. Under the command of Hrolf's mother, Dewey carries the bear cub on his back to present to Robin for her birthday. Robin feels overjoyed when she receives the bear cub for her birthday. She names the bear cub after her stuffed animal Paddington. Robin's menagerie continues to grow each year as she receives more animal pets for her birthdays. The in-habit Adam becomes more attuned to the differences in maturity level between Robin and himself.

Part Five: Wither With Her

Robin, now sixteen years old, decides to make contact with the world outside her menagerie and imagination. She meets Yowrfrowr and Latha Dill. Latha shows Robin around Stay More. She asks Robin to call her mother Karen to let her know that she is still alive, but Robin prefers to keep her whereabouts secret. In return for Latha's hospitality, Robin leaves ten thousand dollars on Latha's bed.

Robin wants her animal friends to help find her a male counterpart. So, Hrolf hosts a meeting among the animals of the house to devise a plan to find a man for Robin. In the meantime, Adam(not to be confuse with the in-habit Adam) revisits his old home up in Madewell Mountain. Adam finally reaches his old house where Robin resides.

The story shifts to future tense. Robin will reunite with her mother Karen and tell her and her new husband Hal about Sugrue Alan. Karen will try to make Robin reconsider her decision to stay with Adam. Robin will decline any publicity of her existence. Robin will appreciate the solitude and comfort of quiet after experiencing more of the sounds of civilization. Robin will thank Sugrue's ghost for making her life as she knows it possible.
