= The Return (What We Do in the Shadows) =

- What We Do in the Shadows episode
- Episode no.: Season 2 Episode 7
- Directed by: Jemaine Clement
- Written by: Jemaine Clement
- Cinematography by: DJ Stipsen
- Editing by: Yana Gorskaya; Dane McMaster
- Production code: XWS02006
- Original air date: May 20, 2020
- Running time: 23 minutes

Guest appearance
- Nick Kroll as Simon the Devious

Episode chronology
← Previous "On the Run"	Next → "Collaboration"

"The Return" is the seventh episode of the second season of the American mockumentary comedy horror television series What We Do in the Shadows, set in the franchise of the same name. It is the seventeenth overall episode of the series and was written by series creator Jemaine Clement. It was released on FX on May 20, 2020.

The series is set in Staten Island, New York City. Like the 2014 film, the series follows the lives of vampires in the city. These consist of three vampires, Nandor, Laszlo, and Nadja. They live alongside Colin Robinson, an energy vampire; and Guillermo, Nandor's familiar. The series explores the absurdity and misfortunes experienced by the vampires. In the episode, the vampires run into Simon the Devious, agreeing to let him stay with them following his bad luck. Meanwhile, Colin Robinson gets into an argument with a troll.

According to Nielsen Media Research, the episode was seen by an estimated 0.377 million household viewers and gained a 0.15 ratings share among adults aged 18–49. The episode received generally positive reviews from critics, who praised Kroll's return, although its writing received a mixed reaction.

== Plot ==
While leaving the theater, Laszlo (Matt Berry) and Nadja (Natasia Demetriou) hear a voice in the sewers telling them to descend. At the sewers, they discover that the voice is Simon the Devious (Nick Kroll). After the accident at the nightclub, his life has been in a downward spiral and now lives in the sewer with his crew member, Carol.

Feeling guilty, Nadja welcomes Simon to live at their house, despite Laszlo's protests that Simon is planning something. Privately, Guillermo (Harvey Guillén) is confronted by Carol, who is aware that he is a vampire killer. When she attacks him, he stabs her with stakes, killing her and turning her to dust. Nandor (Kayvan Novak) stumbles upon it, and questions Guillermo, confessing that he accidentally killed her. Nandor agrees to keep it a secret, as the incident may have severe repercussions for both. Meanwhile, Colin Robinson (Mark Proksch) continues feeding off people's energy through the internet using many accounts. He gets into an argument with a troll, who gets his accounts banned. This prompts him to track his location to Medford, Massachusetts.

As Simon thanks the vampires for taking him in, he finally admits his purpose: he wants the hat back, which Laszlo took from his hospital bed. Laszlo refuses and both fight for the hat, which causes both of them to experience bad luck whenever one uses it. Their fight takes them to the sewers, followed by Nandor, Nadja and Guillermo. Simon finally reveals that he still has his crew with him, one of which includes Elvis Presley, turned into a vampire by Laszlo decades ago. He then proclaims that he yearns for everything Laszlo, disparaging his crew in the process. Wearing the hat, Simon falls into water and slowly sinks, with his crew abandoning him for his previous comments. Colin Robinson arrives at Medford, meeting with the troll at an alleyway. However, the troll is an actual troll, surprising Colin Robinson. He gets into an argument with the troll, draining his energy and distracting him until the sunrise. Exposed to the sunlight, the troll freezes, but he grabs Colin Robinson before freezing, trapping him.

== Production ==
=== Development ===
In April 2020, FX confirmed that the seventh episode of the season would be titled "The Return", and that it would be written and directed by series creator Jemaine Clement. This was Clement's fourth writing credit, and his fifth directing credit.

== Reception ==
=== Viewers ===
In its original American broadcast, "The Return" was seen by an estimated 0.377 million household viewers with a 0.15 in the 18-49 demographics. This means that 0.15 percent of all households with televisions watched the episode. This was a 14% decrease in viewership from the previous episode, which was watched by 0.436 million household viewers with a 0.19 in the 18-49 demographics.

With DVR factored in, the episode was watched by 0.982 million viewers with a 0.4 in the 18-49 demographics.

=== Critical reviews ===
"The Return" received generally positive reviews from critics. Katie Rife of The A.V. Club gave the episode a "B" grade and wrote, "Revisiting that episode made me realize that, this season, What We Do In The Shadows is playing it a little looser. It still, for the most part, hews to a traditional sitcom structure, introducing a conflict at the beginning of an episode and solving it by the end. But it is also breaking down the internal dynamics of that structure a bit, as well as allowing for more elements to reoccur without the need for pat resolutions."

Tony Sokol of Den of Geek wrote, "What We Do in the Shadows has run much smoother comedy in season 2, but 'The Return,' which was written and directed by Jemaine Clement, is a choppy entry. It is still loaded with laughs, gags and suspense, but the effect is somehow more subdued, even as the show retains its frenetic energy. It is still a very witty entry, the characterizations continue to enforce their own punchiness, but it doesn't quite reach the heights of 'Colin's Promotion' or 'The Curse.'" Greg Wheeler of The Review Geek gave the episode a 3.5 star rating out of 5 and wrote, "For now though, Shadows delivers another good episode and thankfully we've got plenty of comedy coming our way for the foreseeable future with this show too."
