= Andrew Silver (producer) =

- Born: Andrew Silver; July 12, 1942 (age 82); New York, New York
- Occupation(s): Film director, producer and writer
- Years active: 1975-present
- Website: asilverproduction.com

Andrew Silver is an American film director, writer and producer.

== Biography ==
He earned 2 degrees at MIT, and his doctorate in organizational psychology from Harvard Business School.

Silver is a co-author of "A Film Director's Approach to Managing Creativity," a chapter in Breakthrough Thinking, published by the Harvard Business School Press.

He is a research affiliate at MIT, where he leads a seminar.

His film career began with Kurt Vonnegut's "Next Door" which won a prize and played on Masterpiece Theater. His current film series is called "May It Happen For You" and has the award winning Radio Cape Cod, Second Wind, and Surprise Engagement, and documentaries about leadership and early childhood education.

His course at MIT IAP explores leadership, team building, managing creativity.

== Filmography ==
Selected Films

- Exploring Leadership (2023)
- Second Wind/Radio Cape Cod (2020) - Producer, director
- Profiles in Aspiration (2018)
- Surprise Engagement (2015) - Producer, director
- Radio Cape Cod (2008) - Producer, director
- Return (1985) - from Some Other Place. The Right Place by Donald Harington. Producer, Director
- Prophetic Voices (1984) - Producer - Director
- Harry Callahan, A Need to See and Express (1982)
- The Murderer (1976) - Producer - Director - adapted from the story by Ray Bradbury
- Next Door (1975) - Producer - Director - adapted from the story by Kurt Vonnegut
