= Return (1985 film) =

- Video cover
- Directed by: Andrew Silver
- Written by: Andrew Silver (screenplay) based on a novel by Donald Harington
- Produced by: Samuel Benedict (ep); Yong-Hee Silver; Philip J. Spinelli
- Starring: Karlene Crockett; John Walcutt; Anne Francis; Frederic Forrest
- Cinematography: János Zsombolyai
- Edited by: Gabrielle Gilbert Reeves
- Music by: Regnar Grippe; Michael Shrieve
- Production company: Silver Productions
- Distributed by: Silver Productions
- Release date: January 24, 1986 (US)
- Running time: 82 minutes (US); 78 minutes (DE)
- Country: United States
- Language: English

Return, also known as Return: A Case of Passion, is a 1985 independent mystery film, written, directed and co-produced by Andrew Silver. It was Silver's debut theatrical work.

== Synopsis ==
Diana Stoving, after experiencing a premonition, becomes convinced that her mother withheld the truth about her family history. Diana travels to Massachusetts to investigate. She coincidentally meets a woman studying past-life regression; one of her subjects is Day Whittaker, a young man who seems to be possessed by the spirit of Diana's deceased grandfather. Under regression, Day claims he died under suspicious circumstances.

== Cast ==
- Karlene Crockett as Diana Stoving
- John Walcutt as Day Whittaker
- Anne Francis as Eileen Sedgeley
- Frederic Forrest as Brian Stoving
- Lee Stetson as Daniel Montcross
- Barbara Kerwin as Ellen Fullerton
- Lisa Richards as Ann Stoving
- Hanna Landy as Elizabeth Holt
- Ariel Aberg-Riger as Diana (age 3)
- Thomas Cross Rolapp as Lucky the mechanic
- Lenore Zann as Susan
- Dennis Hoerter as Mechanic's assistant

== Production ==
Return was based on the 1972 novel Some Other Place. The Right Place. by Donald Harington. The film was shot in Los Angeles and Massachusetts, and was released in theaters January 24, 1986. It was released on VHS in 1988, with an "R" rating.

== Reception ==
Reviews varied from mildly to strongly negative. Vincent Canby of The New York Times found Return to be a "technically competent but completely witless mystery movie about possession and reincarnation." He continued that the film is "always in focus, full of picturesque landscapes, devoid of character and even of suspense." Boston Globe reviewer Michael Blowen wrote "Fans of Shirley MacLaine's New Age fascination with past lives should find Return, a locally produced feature film, entertaining ... This independent film has first-rate production values and excellent performances, but it lacks the necessary tension and suspense to propel it into the rank of first-rate occult movies."

Variety noted that the subtitle ("A case of passion") "gave away" the romantic subplot, and the ending. The film received a cool reception at eFilmCritic; Charles Tatum described it as generating "a complete feeling of indifference", spending too little time on either "character development or suspense." He described the "twist" ending as obvious. Eleanor Mannikka (Rovi/AllMovie) wrote that "the theme veers from possession to suspense thriller, slowing up in the process...", giving the film two stars (of five).

=== Awards ===
John Walcutt won Best Actor (Caixa de Catalunya) at Sitges - Catalan International Film Festival.
