= The Return (Once Upon a Time) =

- Once Upon a Time episode
- Episode no.: Season 1 Episode 19
- Directed by: Paul Edwards
- Written by: Jane Espenson
- Original air date: April 22, 2012

Guest appearances
- David Anders as Dr. Whale; Giancarlo Esposito as Sidney Glass; Anastasia Griffith as Kathryn Nolan; Meghan Ory as Ruby; Beverley Elliott as Granny; Dylan Schmid as Baelfire; Keegan Connor Tracy as The Blue Fairy / Mother Superior

Episode chronology
← Previous "The Stable Boy"	Next → "The Stranger"
- Once Upon a Time season 1

"The Return" is the 19th episode of the American fairy tale/drama television series Once Upon a Time, which aired in the United States on ABC on April 22, 2012. It was written by Jane Espenson, while Paul Edwards served as the director.

The series takes place in the fictional seaside town of Storybrooke, Maine, in which the residents are actually characters from various fairy tales that were transported to the "real world" town by a powerful curse. As Mr. Gold attempts to uncover August Booth's true identity, Emma Swan confronts Regina Mills about her involvement in Kathryn Nolan's disappearance and David attempts to reconcile with Mary Margaret. Meanwhile, Rumpelstiltskin's backstory continues to be revealed along with his attempt to transform back into a human and resume living a normal life with his son.

== Title card ==
August Booth rides his chopper motorcycle through the Enchanted Forest.

== Plot ==
=== In the characters' past ===
In the Enchanted Forest, Baelfire (Dylan Schmid) plays with his ball until it rolls in front of a cart which knocks him down. The driver of the cart fearfully apologizes though Baelfire insists he is okay. Rumpelstiltskin (Robert Carlyle) comes to check on his son who has a scraped knee. As punishment, he turns the driver into a snail and squashes him. Back at home, Rumpelstiltskin treats Baelfire's scrape but the boy refuses magic. Baelfire explains that everyone avoids him because they fear his father. Rumpelstiltskin explains that the only way to destroy his power would be killing him with his own dagger. The housekeeper overhears this, but being a mute, she does not respond. Baelfire asks his father if he could get rid of his power without hurting either one of them, would he do it. Rumpelstiltskin agrees, but he doubts that it is possible. The next day, Rumpelstiltskin encourages Baelfire to play with the other kids while he attends to some business in the woods. Baelfire deduces from the blood on his father's boot that he has killed their housekeeper to keep the dagger a secret. A friend of Baelfire's suggests he call on the Blue Fairy (Keegan Connor Tracy), which he does. The fairy offers Baelfire a magic bean that will take them to a land where magic does not exist and his father would be human again. However this bean is the last one of its kind and will only work once. When Baelfire goes to his father with the plan, Rumpelstiltskin is skeptical, but his son reminds him that he promised.

Father and son take the bean into the woods and throw it on the ground. A vortex opens which will take them to the land with no magic. Baelfire jumps in while holding his father's hand, but Rumpelstiltskin resists, saying he cannot go through with it. His son calls him a coward and lets go. The vortex closes, taking Baelfire away and leaving Rumpelstiltskin behind. He realizes he has made a terrible mistake and calls on the Blue Fairy for help. The Blue Fairy tells Rumpelstiltskin that was his only chance and there is no other way to the realm where his son has gone. When Rumpelstiltskin suggests a curse might take him to Baelfire, the fairy's hesitation tells him he is onto something, but she is opposed to the idea, because she does not believe that he is willing to pay the price of the curse. Rumpelstiltskin lashes out at the fairy for taking his son away, but she tells Rumpelstilskin that he drove his own son away. Rumpelstiltskin vows that he will not rest until he creates such a curse and finds his son.

=== In Storybrooke ===
August (Eion Bailey) wakes up with awful pain in his leg so he makes a call and tells the person on the other end that they must accelerate the plan. The person turns out to be Henry (Jared S. Gilmore) who helps August with a mission at Mr. Gold's (Carlyle) shop. Henry keeps Mr. Gold busy looking for a gift for Mary Margaret (Ginnifer Goodwin) while August searches the office in back. Mr. Gold catches him before he can find anything and becomes suspicious of what August could be looking for. Emma Swan (Jennifer Morrison) visits Kathryn (Anastasia Griffith) to ask what she remembers after her accident. She recalls being kept in a basement but she did not see anyone. Mayor Regina Mills (Lana Parrilla) confronts Mr. Gold about breaking their deal to frame Mary Margaret for Kathryn's murder which is now impossible. Mr. Gold defends that he only broke one deal in his life and it was not this one. "You can't just turn someone into a snail and crush them," he tells her. Regina fears that the set-up and fake DNA test are bound to lead back to her. Kathryn's next visitor is David (Josh Dallas) who apologizes for what happened between them. Kathryn says she does not blame him for realizing they were not right for each other.

At Mary Margaret's welcome home party, Henry presents his teacher with a card and a bell. David arrives, but Mary Margaret signals to Emma that she does not want to see him, so Emma politely sends David away and asks him to take Henry home. Mr. Gold asks Emma what she knows about August and she answers, honestly, that she doesn't know much. Emma counters by asking Mr. Gold what he knows about Kathryn's mysterious reappearance. She finds it hard to tell if he is working with Regina or against her.

The next day Emma continues her investigation by confronting Sidney (Giancarlo Esposito) with the bug she found in his flowers. When Sidney tries to defend Regina, Emma realizes he does her bidding because he is in love with her. Mr. Gold breaks into August's motel room and discovers a drawing of The Dark One's dagger. This raises his concern that the writer might want to kill him. Mr. Gold follows August and discovers him talking with Mother Superior (Tracy). He demands to know what August wanted and she answers only that August asked for advice on reconnecting with his long estranged father. David finally catches up with Mary Margaret and apologizes profusely for doubting her innocence, but she is still hurt deeply by it.

Mr. Gold sees Archie (Raphael Sbarge) to ask how he should handle seeing his son for the first time in years, and is afraid that the conflict between them might have caused anger and resentment. Archie tells him the only thing to do is talk and be honest and, also, to ask for forgiveness. Outside the cabin in the woods, Mr. Gold and August meet to talk openly about their past. Mr. Gold tells August he deeply regrets letting him go and begs for forgiveness. The two share a hug. August explains that he was looking for the dagger because if his father still had it, that means he had not changed. Mr. Gold leads him to the dagger buried in the woods. He offers it to August so he can destroy it. Instead, August attempts to command the Dark One's powers. Mr. Gold bitterly realizes that August is not his son. The dagger has no magic in this world and Baelfire would know that. But since he has heard about the dagger, Mr. Gold deduces August has come from his world. Mr. Gold threatens to kill him and asks August why he is willing to risk such an encounter with him if he is aware of his true identity. August admits that he hoped to find some magic to help cure his illness. He hoped "the savior" (referring to Emma) would believe in magic, but she probably will not before it is too late. Mr. Gold decides to spare August, since he is going to die anyway and he might be his best shot at getting Emma to believe. Thus, he and August establish an alliance.

The next morning, Emma arrives at her office and finds Regina prepared to offer a confession from Sidney. Sidney admits to the kidnapping, the set-up, and faking the DNA results. Emma does not buy this for a minute figuring he is only confessing to Regina's crime because of his infatuation. She tells Regina she knows nobody can win her game, so she is going to play a new one. Emma declares that she is taking back her son.

== Production ==
"The Return" was written by consulting producer Jane Espenson, while Lost veteran, Paul Edwards, directed the episode.

Espenson intended "The Return" to be "very emotional" in both worlds, where "we dig pretty deep." Being "perpetually fascinated" with the character, she explained that he is someone "who has his memories and yet the form of menace that emanates out of him as Mr. Gold is do [sic] different, so contained and snake-y as opposed to the broad, theatrical nature of Rumpelstiltskin." Espenson called Kathryn's reappearance "more of a solution than a problem" that creates some interesting questions. Regina, Espenson commented, did not expect Kathryn to return, which makes another character get into trouble.

== Reception ==
=== Ratings ===
After two weeks of reruns, this outing returned to improved numbers, going up to a 3.0/8 among 18-49s with 9.08 million viewers tuning in and once again winning its timeslot, although CBS' The Amazing Race, which came in second, had more viewers in the same time period. It also beat the first hour of Fox's 25th Anniversary Special.

In Canada, the episode finished in fourteenth place for the week with an estimated 1.473 million viewers, an increase from the 1.409 million of the previous episode.

=== Reviews ===
The episode was met with good reviews.

The A.V. Club writer Oliver Sava graded the episode with a C. Complaining that nothing "of consequence" has occurred for most of the season, Sava commented that the series "is following the Lost formula of answering a question with more questions, but that’s frustrating when the characters and stories are less than captivating. The best thing this episode does is explicitly discuss fairy tale business in Storybrooke, which instills faith that the two storylines will intersect at some point. It’s just taking so goddamn long to get there." IGN columnist Amy Ratcliffe graded the episode 7 out of 10, and called Baelfire's quest to rid his father of powers "heartwarming," as she liked "knowing there was a point where Rumplestiltskin could have changed his fate." She did wish however that there had been a better payoff about August's real identity. Ratcliffe was disappointed with the revelation of August not being Rumpelstiltskin's son, commenting that it "should have delivered a big punch, but it swung and missed." She was "impressed" with Robert Carlyle's "stellar" performance, and concluded her review by noting the episode was "entertaining, but it's not riveting as often as I hope it will be. I give points to this episode for some quality scenes and genuine emotion, but that can't carry the plot. The rest of the season is going to be an interesting ride.
