= Farther Along (novel) =

2008 novel by Donald Harington

First edition (publ. Toby)

Farther Along is an American novel written by Donald Harington. It was published in 2008.

== Plot ==
The Bluff Dweller decides to abandon modern living, to vanish from society, so he begins living like a Native-American inside a cave up in the Ozark Mountains. The Bluff Dweller nearly drinks himself to death, but two women save him.

== Characters ==
- The Bluff Dweller – the protagonist of the novel and only identifier for his name that is given by Harington, former curator of a museum of U.S. historical treasures, who has left his life to live in a stone cave, and to take on the appearance of the people who used to live in such places, "Bluff Dwellers".
- Eliza Cunningham – an attractive historian who wants to study the paramour of a former governor of the state. She is also the love interest of the Bluff Dweller.
- French horn – a mysterious narrator of the novel, may be a woman's monologue.
