= Son of Spirit =

Studio album by Spirit
- Released: October 1975
- Length: 32:23
- Label: Mercury
- Producer: Randy California

Spirit chronology
Spirit of '76 (1975)	Son of Spirit (1975)	Farther Along (1976)

Professional ratings
Review scores
Source	Rating
AllMusic	4/5 stars
Classic Rock	4/5 stars

Son of Spirit was the second album that Spirit released through Mercury Records, and their seventh album overall. It was released in October 1975. Unlike Spirit of '76, however, it did not make the national charts.

Though some of the album's tracks were from the same sessions that produced Spirit of '76, it also features several Randy California solo demos that have been augmented by a rhythm machine.

It was originally reissued on CD in the early 1990s, and it was remastered and reissued (on a CD that also included Farther Along) in 2004 by Beat Goes On.

== Track listing ==
All songs written by Randy California except noted.

No.	Title	Writer(s)	Length
1.	"Holy Man"		3:03
2.	"Looking into Darkness"	California, Cassidy	2:54
3.	"Maybe You'll Find"		2:38
4.	"Don't Go Away"		3:45
5.	"Family"		3:06
6.	"Magic Fairy Princess"		2:59
7.	"Circle"		3:30
8.	"The Other Song"	California, Cassidy, Keene	5:31
9.	"Yesterday"	Lennon–McCartney	1:54
10.	"It's Time Now"		3:04

== Personnel ==
=== Spirit ===
- Randy California – bass, guitar, vocals
- Ed Cassidy – percussion, drums
- Barry Keene – bass

=== Production ===
- Gary Brandt – engineer
- Barry Keene – engineer
- Steve Mantoani – engineer
- Blair Mooney – engineer
- Keith Olsen – engineer
