= Morgan Rice =

American author

- Occupation: Novelist
- Writing career
- Years active: 2011-present
- Genres: Young adult fiction, Science fiction, Fantasy
- Notable work: A Quest of Heroes (2013 book)
- Website: www.morganricebooks.com

Morgan Rice is an American author of fantasy and science fiction novels, with her books making the New York Times, USA Today, Apple Books, and other bestseller lists. Her first novel, A Quest of Heroes, was self-published in 2013 and was the first of 17 books in her epic fantasy series The Sorcerer's Ring.

== Career ==
Rice is the author of dozens of fantasy and sci-fi novels. She self-publishes her works and in 2011 stated she had no interest in pursuing traditional publishing for her young adult novels. Rice describes herself as a "lifelong fan of fantasy" who as a child spent countless years devouring everything in the genre.

Rice's books have made the New York Times, USA Today, Apple Books, and other bestseller lists. In 2013, the first three books of her Sorcerer's Ring series were among the best-selling books on Amazon.com. In February 2016, four of her books were among the top 20 highest-selling American iBooks in the sci-fi/fantasy category.

== Critical response ==
Midwest Book Review called Rice's novel A Throne for Sisters "a combination of feisty protagonists and challenging circumstances to thoroughly involve not just young adults, but adult fantasy fans who seek epic stories fueled by powerful friendships and adversaries." Midwest Book Review also praised her novel Transmission as a "sci-fi story that will reach adults as much as young adult audiences." However, Publishers Weekly described A Quest of Heroes as "action-packed" but that the book's "predictable plot is packed full of fantasy clichés, the pacing is rushed, and character development is hasty" while Kirkus Reviews described the novel as "A fun but anemic, derivative fantasy."

== Works ==
=== Of Crowns and Glory series ===
1. Slave, Warrior, Queen (free)
2. Rogue, Prisoner, Princess
3. Knight, Heir, Prince
4. Rebel, Pawn, King
5. Soldier, Brother, Sorcerer
6. Hero, Traitor, Daughter
7. Ruler, Rival, Exile
8. Victor, Vanquished, Son

=== Kings and Sorcerers series ===
1. Rise of the Dragons (free)
2. Rise of the Valiant
3. The Weight of Honor
4. A Forge of Valor
5. A Realm of Shadows
6. Night of the Bold

=== Sorcerer's Ring series ===
1. A Quest of Heroes (free and has a free graphic novel) published January 2013 in English, translated to Spanish before summer 2014.
2. A March of Kings
3. A Fate of Dragons
4. A Clash of Honor (sometimes mistakenly reported as A Cry of Honor)
5. A Vow of Glory
6. A Charge of Valor
7. A Rite of Swords
8. A Grant of Arms
9. A Sky of Spells
10. A Sea of Shields
11. A Reign of Steel
12. A Land of Fire
13. A Rule of Queens
14. An Oath of Brothers
15. A Dream of Mortals
16. A Joust of Knights
17. A Gift of Battle

=== A Throne for Sisters series ===
1. A Throne for Sisters
2. A Court for Thieves
3. A Song for Orphans
4. A Dirge for Princes
5. A Jewel for Royals
6. A Kiss for Queens
7. A Crown for Assassins
8. A Clasp for Heirs

=== Survival trilogy ===
1. Arena One (free)
2. Arena Two
3. Arena Three

=== Vampire, Fallen series ===
1. Before Dawn

=== Vampire Journals series ===
1. Turned (free)
2. Loved
3. Betrayed
4. Destined
5. Desired (released in 2011)
6. Betrothed
7. Vowed
8. Found
9. Resurrected
10. Craved
11. Fated
12. Obsessed

=== Way of Steel series ===
1. Only the Worthy
2. Only the Valiant
3. Only the Destined
4. Only the Bold

=== Age of the Sorcerers Series ===
1. Realm of Dragons
2. Throne of Dragons
3. Born of Dragons
4. Ring of Dragons
5. Crown of Dragons
6. Dusk of Dragons
7. Shield of Dragons
8. Dream of Dragons

=== Wish Series ===
1. Wish
2. Desire
3. Adore
4. Thirst
5. Ache
6. Crave

=== ShadowSeer Series ===
1. London
2. Paris
3. Munich
4. Rome
5. Athens

=== Sword of the Dead Series ===
1. Sword of the Dead
2. Song of the Valiant
3. Crown of the Righteous
4. Shield of the Fallen
5. Cry of the Bold

=== Invasion Chronicles Series ===
1. Transmission
2. Arrival
3. Ascent
4. Return

=== Oliver Blue Series ===
1. The Magic Factory
2. The Orb of Kandra
3. The Obsidians
4. The Scepter of Fire

=== Deathborn ===
1. Veiled
2. Stolen
3. Threatened (expected December, 2025)
