= The Returning =

- Film poster
- Directed by: John Day
- Written by: Arthur Baysting; John Day
- Based on: an original idea by Simon Willisson and John Day
- Produced by: Trisha Downie
- Starring: Phillip Gordon; Alison Routledge
- Cinematography: Kevin Haywood
- Edited by: Simon Clothier
- Music by: Clive Cockburn
- Production companies: Echo Pictures; New Zealand Film Commission
- Release date: February 16, 1991
- Running time: 91 min
- Countries: Australia; New Zealand
- Language: English

The Returning is a 1991 Australia-New Zealand horror film directed by John Day. It had its premiere in Gore, New Zealand on 16 February. Day was nominated for Best Director the 1992 New Zealand Film Awards.

The film, which Day calls "a powerful love story with all the elements of a psychological thriller", was inspired by a dream. Filming began in February 1990 with Phillip Gordon and Alison Routledge in the lead roles.

== Cast ==
- Phillip Gordon as Alan Steadman
- Alison Routledge as Jessica Scott
- Max Cullen as Donohue
- Jim Moriarty as George
- John Ewart as Steadman Senior
- Grant Tilly as Dr Pitts
- Jenny Ryken as Charlotte Heatherington

== Reception ==
John Parker in Onfilm called it an "excellent erotic/psychological/supernatural thriller". Richard Scheib of Moria gave it 1 star and said "Doing an old-fashioned weepie ghost story in this day and age either takes a dedicated romanticism or a great foolhardiness to pull off. Sadly, this New Zealand-made effort, which never seems to have been seen by the wider world, has neither and emerges as a film of astounding silliness. " Jim Murphy in the Age's Green Guide said it "is heavy with Gothic trappings and intriguing enough if you for that sort of thing." Writing in The Evening Post Phil Wakefield said "[Day] imbues the South Otago countryside with a rich Days of Heaven texture which even rivals some of Kurosawa’s work in Dreams. And there’s little to fault about the principal performances, which is refreshing change for a Kiwi feature. Philip Gordon in particular, is excellent as the Auckland lawyer who goes bush and finds himself seduced by a supernatural presence."
