= Michael Clarke (musician) =

American rock drummer (1946–1993)

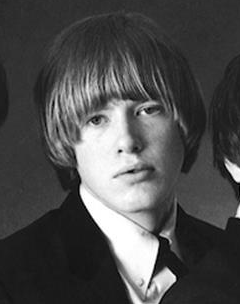
- Clarke in 1965

Background information
- Born: Michael James Dick; June 3, 1946; Spokane, Washington, U.S.
- Origin: San Francisco, California, U.S.
- Died: December 19, 1993 (aged 47) Treasure Island, Florida, U.S.
- Genres: Rock, folk rock, country rock
- Occupation: Musician
- Instruments: Drums, percussion
- Years active: 1964–1993
- Formerly of: The Byrds, The Flying Burrito Brothers, Firefall

Michael Clarke (born Michael James Dick; June 3, 1946 – December 19, 1993) was an American musician, best known as the drummer for rock group the Byrds from 1964 to 1968. Clarke was later a member if the country-rock group The Flying Burrito Brothers (1969–1971) and rock group Firefall (1974–1980).

Clarke was inducted into the Rock and Roll Hall of Fame as a member of the Byrds in 1991. He died in 1993, aged 47, from liver failure—a direct result of more than three decades of heavy alcohol consumption.

== Early life ==
Clarke was born and raised in Spokane, Washington. His father was a pipefitter and his mother was an amateur musician. Clarke left home when he was 17 years old and hitchhiked to California to become a musician.

== Career ==
=== The Byrds ===
Clarke was nineteen years old and a jazz drummer when he met David Crosby while he was hitchhiking in California. Clarke then joined Crosby's new group which became The Byrds.

Clarke was not an accomplished musician prior to joining the Byrds but he had played the drums in his younger years. Despite his prior drumming experience, Clarke had no drum set upon joining the Byrds; he practiced on a makeshift kit of cardboard boxes and a tambourine with real drum sticks. According to lead guitarist Roger McGuinn's web site, Clarke was hired by McGuinn and Gene Clark for his resemblance to the Rolling Stones' guitarist Brian Jones.

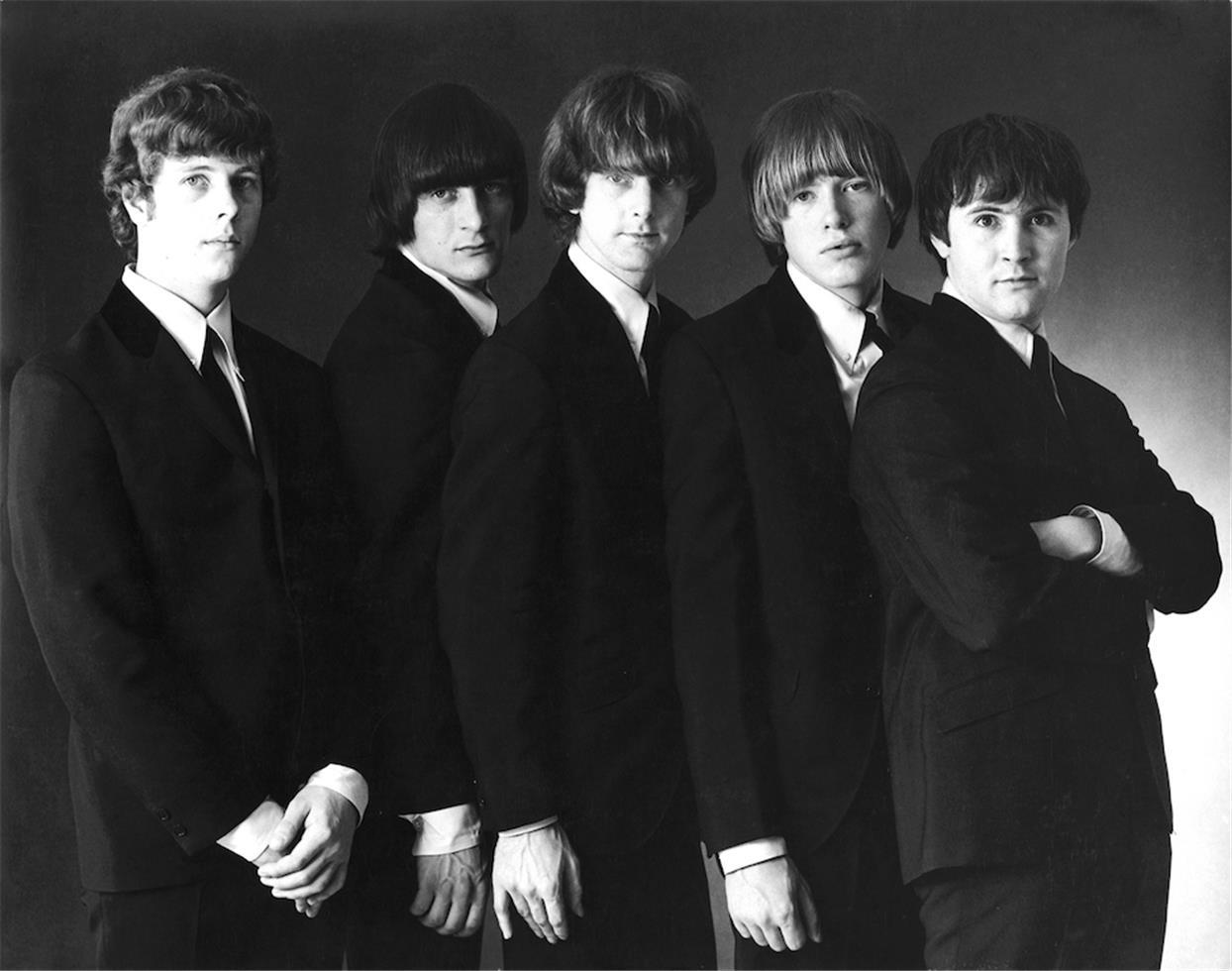
The Byrds in 1965, Clarke stands second from the right

Born Michael Dick, he changed his surname to "Clarke" when he joined the Byrds, as he reportedly thought the surname Dick was "unpalatable". He changed it to Clarke due to his love of The Dick Clark Show, but added an extra "e" on the end so he wouldn't be confused with Gene Clark.

Clarke's strength as a drummer is considered to be illustrated by his jazz-oriented playing on the Byrds' "Eight Miles High", on the Fifth Dimension album. In his 2020 autobiography, Time Between, the Byrds bassist Chris Hillman states that "Michael's drum work on the record is brilliant."

Although not a prolific songwriter like the other members of the Byrds, Clarke’s compositional contributions with the band included co-writing credits for the songs "Captain Soul", an instrumental from the Fifth Dimension album (based on Lee Dorsey's "Get Out Of My Life, Woman"), and "Artificial Energy" from The Notorious Byrd Brothers. He was also given an arrangement co-credit for two traditional songs that appeared on Fifth Dimension: "Wild Mountain Thyme" and "John Riley" (although the latter is credited to Bob Gibson and songwriter/arranger Ricky Neff on the album itself).

In August 1967, during the recording sessions for The Notorious Byrd Brothers album, Clarke walked out on the Byrds and was temporarily replaced by session drummers Jim Gordon and Hal Blaine.

Clarke had recently become dissatisfied with his role in the band, and did not particularly like the new material that the songwriting members were providing. However, he continued to honor his live concert commitments, appearing at a handful of shows during late August and early September 1967. Clarke returned from his self-imposed exile in time to contribute drums to the song "Artificial Energy" in early December 1967, but was reportedly fired from the band by McGuinn and Chris Hillman once The Notorious Byrd Brothers album was completed, on January 3, 1968. In his 2020 memoir, Hillman disputes the account that Clarke was fired. "Not long after the photo shoot (for the album cover), Mike announced that he... would be leaving us. To this day, I'm not entirely sure why he made that choice. I know he was disillusioned and burned out, but I hated to see him go."

=== Dillard and Clark, and Flying Burrito Brothers ===
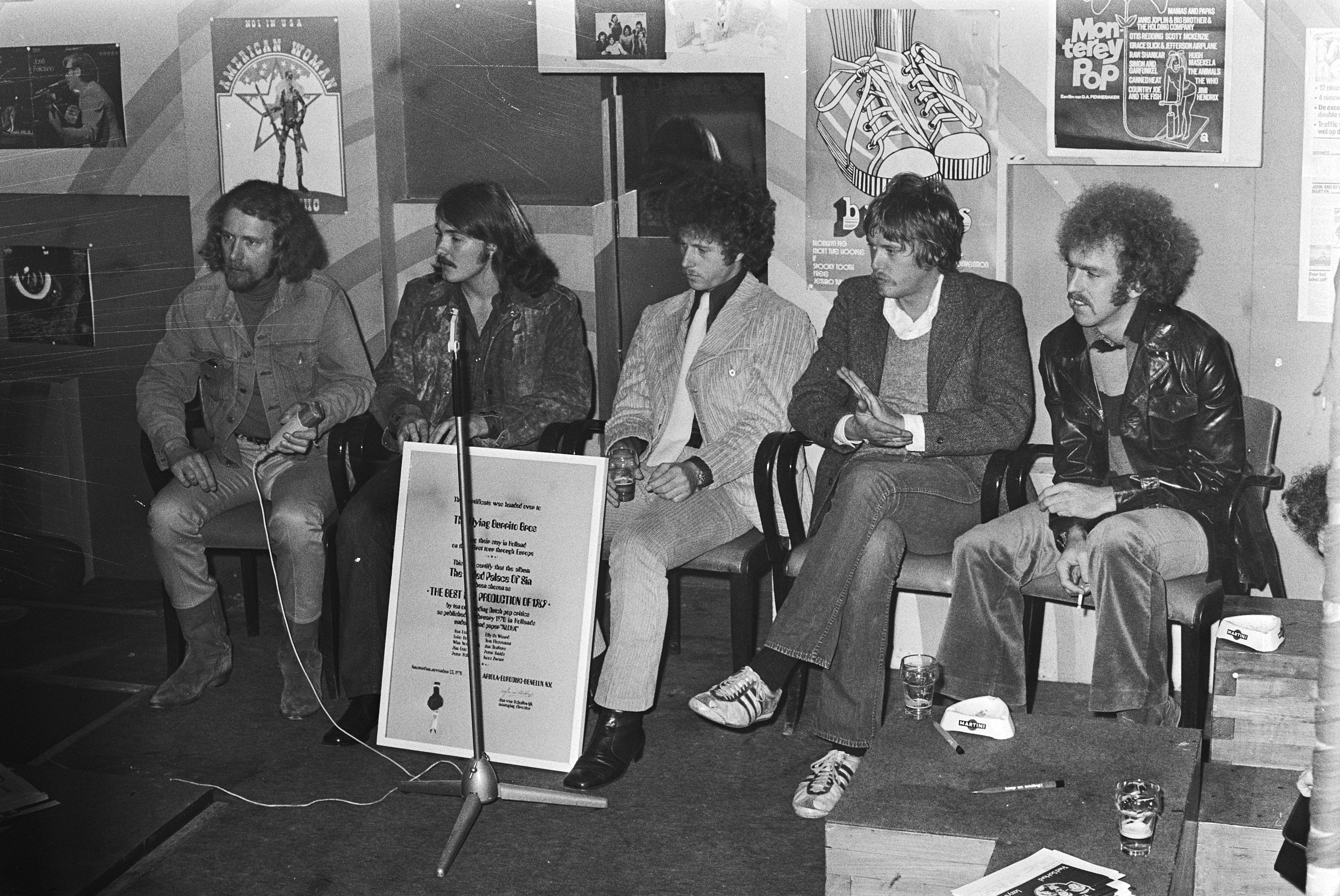
Flying Burrito Brothers (Amsterdam, 1970). From left to right: Sneaky Pete Kleinow, Rick Roberts, Chris Hillman, Michael Clarke, Bernie Leadon.

After leaving the Byrds, Clarke moved to Hawaii for several months, working in the hotel business and pursuing his interest in painting. He soon returned to music and moved back to California, where Clarke played briefly with Gene Clark in Dillard and Clark, accompanying them in a few early live performances, before following Hillman and Gram Parsons into country-rock pioneers The Flying Burrito Brothers, after their first album had been recorded. Clarke served with the Burritos between early 1969 and 1972, appearing with the band at the infamous Altamont Free Concert in California, headlined by the Rolling Stones, in December 1969.

=== Firefall ===
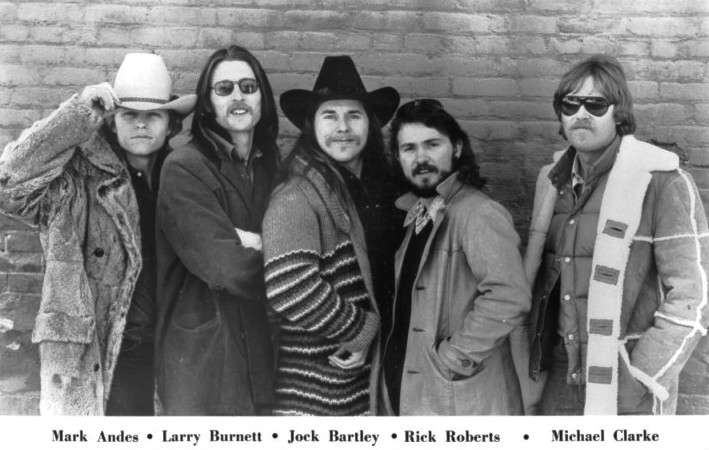
Firefall in 1977

In 1974, Clarke was invited by former Burrito Brothers bandmate Rick Roberts to join his new group Firefall, formed by Roberts, with Jock Bartley, Larry Burnett and Mark Andes. Clarke was reportedly hired on the spot during the phone call with Roberts, and after landing in Colorado (where the group formed), they relocated to New York.

The band's biggest hit single was "You Are the Woman" in 1976, which peaked at number 9 on the US charts. Firefall was commercially successful as their first four albums were all certified either gold or platinum. But Clarke's excessive drinking meant he missed out on the entirety of a 1979 tour of Japan. A year later, after the release of their Undertow album, Clarke left the band.

His departure from Firefall was followed by a period as the drummer for Jerry Jeff Walker, ending in 1982.

=== Byrds lawsuit controversy and Hall of Fame induction ===
Between 1983 and 1985, Clarke joined former Byrds singer Gene Clark in The Firebyrds, a touring band which had been put together to promote Gene Clark's 1984 solo album Firebyrd. In 1985, following the breakup of The Firebyrds, Clarke and Clark again joined forces for a series of controversial shows billed as a "20th Anniversary Tribute to The Byrds". Among the other musicians involved in this project were John York, another ex-Byrd from the late 1960s line-up of the group; ex-Burritos and Firefall singer Rick Roberts; ex-member of the Beach Boys' early 1970s line-up Blondie Chaplin; and Rick Danko, formerly of the Band. Many nightclubs simply shortened the billing to "The Byrds", and the pair soon found themselves involved in acrimonious court battles with David Crosby, McGuinn and Hillman over the use of the group's name.

The Byrds set aside their differences long enough to appear together at their induction into the Rock & Roll Hall of Fame in January 1991, where the original line-up played three songs together: "Mr. Tambourine Man", "Turn! Turn! Turn!" and "I'll Feel a Whole Lot Better". Gene Clark died less than five months later, of a heart attack, on May 24, 1991.

From 1987 until his death in 1993, Clarke toured as The Byrds featuring Michael Clarke. Skip Battin and John York, who had played with Roger McGuinn in later versions of the Byrds, also played at various points in The Byrds featuring Michael Clarke. Following the failure of McGuinn, Crosby and Hillman to obtain an injunction against Clarke, it was generally accepted that Clarke's continuing usage of the name was tantamount to ownership, particularly when not used by any other group member and where other group members, particularly Roger McGuinn, had repeatedly denied any interest in performing again under the Byrds name.

== Declining health and death ==
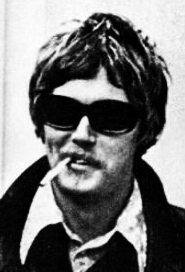
Clarke in 1971

Clarke began drinking alcohol when he was fourteen years old, and claimed in a posthumous letter that from then until two weeks before he died, he "could hardly remember ever being sober again". He drank a two litre bottle of Vodka every day, and would drink beer while on stage. By the late 1980s, Clarke's health had declined from a lifetime of hard drinking, resulting in a number of hospital stays. Just before his death, his liver began disintegrating, and he said in his posthumous letter you "could see pieces of it breaking off in my guts with a special type of x-ray picture taken called a sonogram".

Clarke died of liver failure at the age of 47 at his condominium in Treasure Island, Florida, on December 19, 1993. At the time of his death, Clarke weighed only 47 kilos, and his liver was the size of a fifty pence piece.

Billy Moore, who had organized a New Year's Eve concert at a resort where Clarke and his band were scheduled to perform, stated that at the time of his death, Clarke had recently learned that he had become terminally ill due to his liver problems. Moore would eventually hire a Nashville drummer to fill in, and changed the concert from a New Year's Eve celebration to a tribute show dedicated to Clarke.

During his final days, Clarke had expressed a wish to appear on television in the hope of alerting children to the dangers of alcoholism. Following his wishes, Clarke's wife Susan Paul started a foundation in Clarke's name, called the Campaign for Alcohol-Free Kids. In 1994, a year after his death, Clarke's paintings were published in Dick Gautier and Jim McMullan's book, Musicians As Artists. He wrote a message about his struggles with alcoholism, his regrets of ever drinking, and his encouraging others not to drink, which was released posthumously, published by Alcohelp.

In his memoir, Chris Hillman eulogized Clarke thus:

"Everyone loved Michael, who always lived in the moment and always had a beautiful woman on his arm. I don't think he ever made an enemy in the world and, despite his cunning and larceny, he was a joy to know. We (The Byrds) all forgave him because we loved him so much."

== Discography ==
With The Byrds

With The Flying Burrito Brothers

- Burrito Deluxe (1970)
- The Flying Burrito Bros (1971)
- Last of the Red Hot Burritos (1972)
- Close Up the Honky Tonks (1974)

With Firefall

- Firefall (1976)
- Luna Sea (1977)
- Élan (1978)
- Undertow (1980)

'Other

- Barry McGuire And The Doctor – Barry McGuire (1971)
- Early L.A. Sessions – Gene Clark (1972)
- Roadmaster – Gene Clark (1973)
- Roger McGuinn – Roger McGuinn (1973) (one track)
- Terry Melcher – Terry Melcher (1974)
- Rumplestiltskin's Resolve – Shawn Phillips (1975)
- Sleepless Nights - Gram Parsons (1976)
- Spaced – Shawn Phillips (1977)
- Clear Sailin' – Chris Hillman (1977) (one track)
- Cow Jazz – Jerry Jeff Walker (1980)
