= David Muse =

American musician (1949–2022)

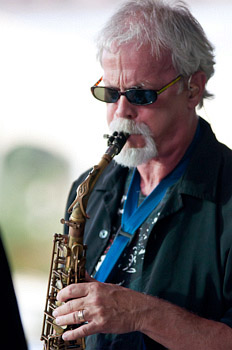

Background information
- Born: July 27, 1949; Rome, Georgia, U.S.
- Died: August 6, 2022 (aged 73)
- Genres: Smooth jazz, rock, pop
- Occupation: Musician
- Instruments: Flute, saxophone, keyboards
- Years active: 1969–2022
- Label: Deva Records
- Website: www.davemuse.com

David Muse (July 27, 1949 – August 6, 2022) was an American musician. He performed and recorded with numerous artists including Firefall, The Marshall Tucker Band, Pam Rose, Bertie Higgins, Navarro, Boulder County Conspiracy, and Tonal Alchemy. During his 50+ year career, he appeared on more than 25 recordings and was awarded three Gold and two Platinum albums.

== Career ==
=== Early days ===
Some of David Muse's early musical ventures included J.R. & the Newtrons (featuring future Firefall singer Rick Roberts) and The Sons of Man (also with Roberts). After attending St. Petersburg Junior College, he performed as a member of Too Much Boogie. He was later invited to join Taxi, the house band at Scarlett O'Hara's in the original Underground Atlanta, where he remained for nearly four years until joining Firefall.

=== Firefall (1975–1981, 1994–1995, 2000–2003, 2011–2022) ===
Muse joined Firefall in 1975 at the invitation of old friend Rick Roberts. The band had recently signed a deal with Atlantic Records and was preparing to record their debut, self-titled album Firefall. Since Muse was not an original signatory to the deal with Atlantic Records, the label would not allow his picture to be on the album and insisted that he be listed as an additional musician. The band always considered him an original member and was credited as such on their second album Luna Sea, released in 1977. From 1975–1981 the band released five albums and produced hits such as You Are The Woman, Goodbye, I Love You, Strange Way, Just Remember I Love You and Cinderella. During this time, Firefall toured the world and shared stages with Fleetwood Mac, The Doobie Brothers, The Band, The Beach Boys and Lynyrd Skynyrd. Unrest and tension among band members led to the breakup of the original band in 1981.

Muse performed with the band occasionally over the years, returning as a full-time band member in 2011. Original bassist Mark Andes returned to the band at this same time.

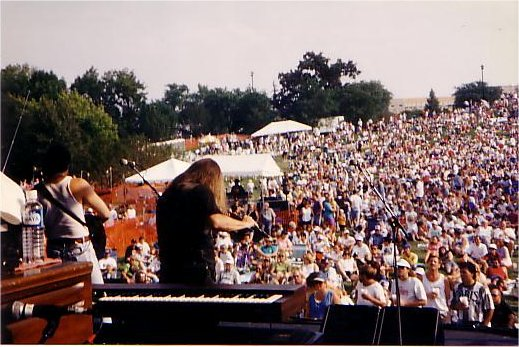
Muse performing with The Marshall Tucker Band

=== The Marshall Tucker Band (1996–2000, 2003–2008) ===
When original member Jerry Eubanks decided to retire in 1996, Muse was invited to join The Marshall Tucker Band to cover sax, flute and keyboard duties. He toured and recorded with the band until 2001, when he left for a Firefall reunion. He returned in 2003, departing again in 2008 for other projects. Muse appears on seven MTB albums.

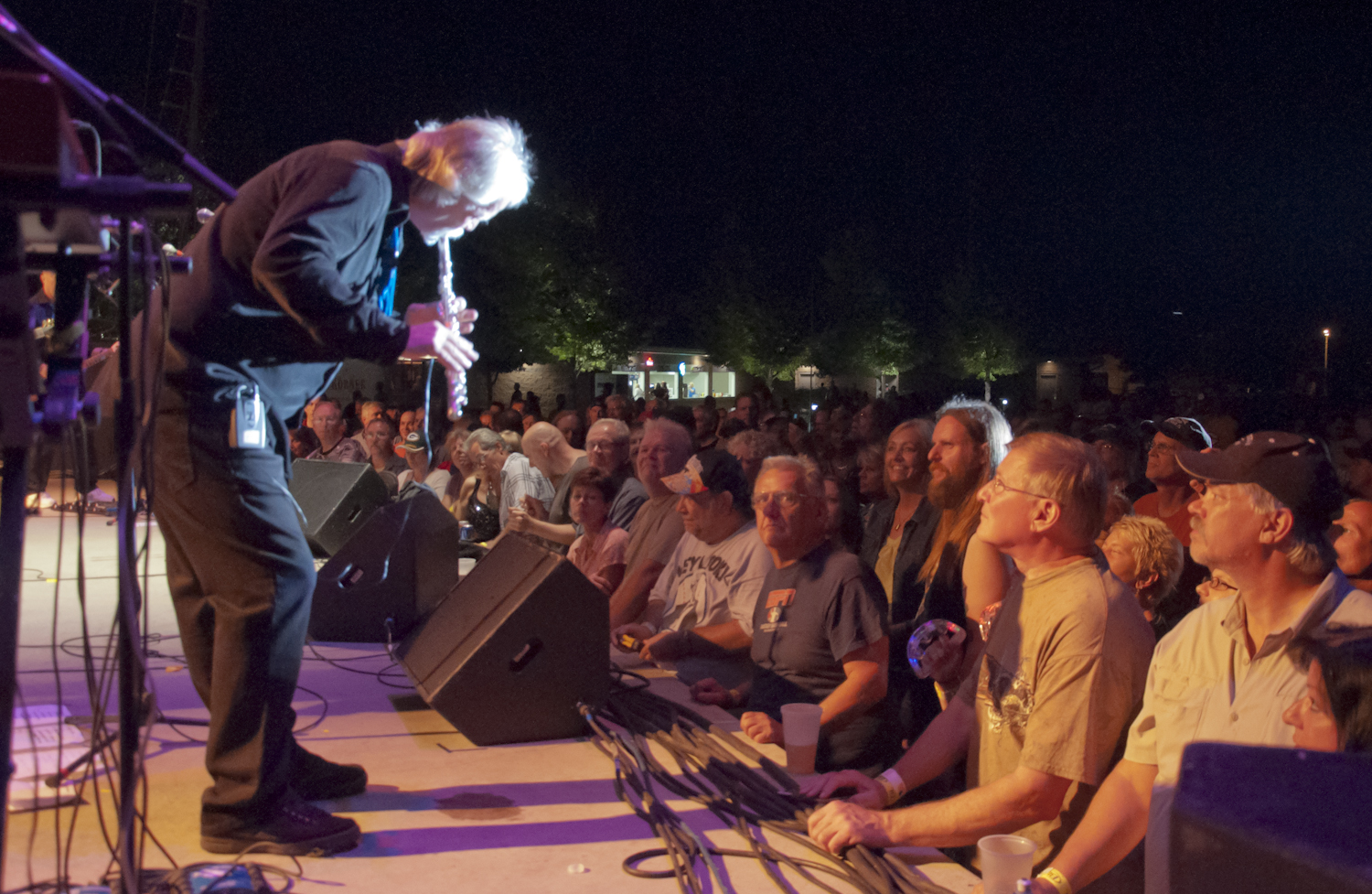
Muse performing with Boulder County Conspiracy at Waterfest in Oshkosh, Wi. (2012)

=== Boulder County Conspiracy (2012) ===
With help from business partner Jeff O'Kelley, Muse formed Boulder County Conspiracy in 2012. The band included guitarist Jock Bartley (Firefall, Gram Parsons & the Fallen Angels), percussionist Joe Lala (Blues Image, CSN&Y, Manassas), drummer Bobby Caldwell (Rick Derringer, Captain Beyond, Johnny Winter And), guest bassist Mark Andes (JoJo Gunne, Spirit, Firefall, Heart), bassist Alan Carmen, guitarist Max Combs and guitarist Billy Sandlin. BCC performed a number of concerts, including Waterfest in Oshkosh, Wisconsin and the Clearwater Star Spectacular in Clearwater, Florida. The band dissolved in late 2012 due to scheduling conflicts and booking issues.

=== Solo instrumental music ===
In addition to his participation in various bands, Muse was active with his solo career. The music can be referred to as contemporary, instrumental jazz with a bit of Latin flair. He toured and performed regularly when not on the road with Firefall.

=== Later career ===
In April 2008, Muse joined the surviving original members of Firefall for a reunion concert at Boulder Theater in Boulder, Colorado. The concert was recorded and appeared as Firefall Reunion Live in 2009. He returned to Firefall as a full-time member in the summer of 2011, after successfully completing treatment for non-Hodgkin lymphoma.

On January 9, 2014, Muse was inducted into the Colorado Music Hall of Fame as a member of Firefall. Also inducted during this ceremony were Poco, The Nitty Gritty Dirt Band and Stephen Stills & Manassas. The ceremony and concert were held at the Paramount Theater in Denver, Colorado.

Muse released his 4th solo recording, Forgotten Journey in May 2018. He joined the Cannonball Musical Instruments family as an endorser for their Mio line of flutes in March 2019. He released his final solo recording Ninety Degree Phase Shift in 2021.

== Death ==
In 2020, Muse was diagnosed with cancer, from which he died on August 6, 2022, at age 73.

== Discography ==
Solo Recordings

- Tonal Alchemy (1981)
- Fantasies of Love (1983)
- Firefall Revisited (2016)
- Forgotten Journey (2018)
- Ninety Degree Phase Shift (2021)

As a member of Firefall

- Firefall (1976) – Certified GOLD (11/3/1976) & PLATINUM (April 19, 2004)
- Luna Sea (1977) – Certified GOLD (10/3/1977)
- Elan (1978) – Certified GOLD (October 17, 1978) & PLATINUM (1/10/1979)
- Undertow (1980)
- The Best of Firefall (1981)
- Clouds Across the Sun (1981)
- Break of Dawn (1982)
- Greatest Hits (1992)
- Concert Classics, Vol. 2 (1999)
- Colorado (2001)
- Firefall Reunion Live (2009)
- Comet (2020)

As a member of The Marshall Tucker Band

- Face Down in the Blues (1998)
- Gospel (1999)
- Beyond the Horizon (2004)
- Carolina Christmas (2005)
- Anthology (2005)
- The Next Adventure (2007)
- Live from Spartanburg, South Carolina (2013)

Appearances

- Listen, Navarro (1977) – Hammond Organ
- Morpheus, Pam Rose (2004)
- The Ultimate Collection, Bertie Higgins (2005) – Flute, Penny Whistle, Recorder

== Television appearances ==
- Dick Clark's American Bandstand – Season 24, Episode 17 (2/7/1981)
- Austin City Limits – Season 2, Episode 6 (1977)
- The Midnight Special – Season 8, Episode 27 (May 20, 1980)
- VH1's Where Are They Now? AM Classics – Season 3, Episode 9 (8/7/2002)
