= Comet (Firefall album) =

Studio album by Firefall
- Released: December 11, 2020
- Genre: Country rock, soft rock, pop rock
- Length: 40:26
- Label: Sunset Blvd Records

Firefall chronology
Messenger (1994)	Comet (2020)

Comet is the ninth album by Firefall, released on December 11, 2020.

It is the band's first studio album since 1994, and the first to feature vocalist Gary Jones.

== Background ==
Following Mark Andes return to Firefall in 2014, the band began work on a new album, writing individually and together. Leadoff single "Way Back When," finds Jock Bartley reminiscing about great performers of the past. He recalled, "I wrote the first verse about the Beatles, the Rolling Stones, and the Byrds in 1965. Then, I Googled the top 100 hits of 1967 and I saw Aretha Franklin and the Rascals and all the songs. Then I did the same on the next verse for 1969 with Creedence Clearwater Revival, Crosby, Stills and Nash, and Led Zeppelin."

"A New Mexico" is a sequel to Firefall's 1976 song "Mexico." According to Bartley, “I kind of started thinking we need a new Mexico song kind of like ‘Mexico,’ where I can just burn, you know, as a lead guitar player.” Newcomer Gary Jones, who joined Firefall in 2014, contributes "Never Be The Same," a “crushing song about the passing of his mother."

Mark Andes contributes a cover of Randy California's "Nature's Way", originally released in 1971 by Andes' previous band, Spirit. A live staple since Andes' return to Firefall in 2014, the song features guest appearances from Timothy B. Schmit and John McFee.

Firefall completed recording in November 2019, but delayed the release due to the COVID-19 pandemic. The band ultimately decided to release the album in December 2020. According to Andes, "The new record is our way of staying in touch with our audience without being able to tour."

== Track listing ==
1. "Way Back When" (Jock Bartley, Terry Peacock) – 3:47
2. "A Real Fine Day" (Robbin Thompson) – 4:10
3. "Hardest Chain" (Tony Rosario, Sandy Ficca) – 4:41
4. "Nature's Way" (Randy California) – 3:17
5. "Younger" (Gary Burr) – 4:19
6. "There She Is" (Bartley) – 3:18
7. "Ghost Town" (Michael Ehmid, Tony Joe White) – 4:34
8. "Never Be the Same" (Gary Jones) – 3:59
9. "Before I Met You" (Bartley) – 3:59
10. "A New Mexico" (Bartley) – 4:22

== Personnel ==
Firefall

- Jock Bartley – lead and rhythm guitars, lead vocals on "Way Back When", "There She Is" and "Before I Met You", background vocals, acoustic guitars, mandolin on "Hardest Chain", percussion
- Mark Andes – bass, lead vocals on "Nature's Way", background vocals
- David Muse – flute, saxophone, piano, organ, synthesizers, background vocals
- Sandy Ficca – drums and percussion
- Gary Jones – lead vocals, background vocals, acoustic guitars

Additional personnel

- Timothy B. Schmit – lead and background vocals on "Nature's Way"
- John McFee – pedal steel guitar, acoustic and baritone guitars on "Nature's Way"
- John Jorgenson – electric 12-string guitar on "Way Back When"
- Donnie Lee Clark – background vocals on "Younger" and "Ghost Town"
- Mark Trippensee – lead vocals on "A New Mexico", background vocals
- Steven Weinmeister – background vocals
- Tudie Calderone – congas, timbales, shakers, vibraslap, HTS (high tinkly shit)
- Jim Waddell – keyboards on "Before I Met You" and "A New Mexico"

Production

- Produced by Jock Bartley and Firefall except "A Real Fine Day" produced by Jock Bartley and Zach Allen, "Hardest Chain" produced by Sandy Ficca and Jock Bartley, "Nature's Way" produced by Mark Andes and Jock Bartley, and "Never Be The Same" produced by Zach Allen
- Mastered by David Glasser at Airshow Mastering, Boulder, Colorado
- Engineered by Brian McRae, Sandy Ficca, Evan Hodge, Michael Lattanzi, Zach Allen, Taylor Marvin, Kyle Smith, Kyle Sheppard, Tyler Duffus, Dave Muse, George Harris, Robert McEntee, Hank Linderman and John McFee
