= Windmills (album) =

Studio album by Rick Roberts
- Released: September 1972
- Recorded: 1972
- Genre: Country rock
- Length: 38:02
- Label: A&M
- Producer: David Anderle

Rick Roberts chronology
The Flying Burrito Brothers (1971)	Windmills (1972)	She Is a Song (1973)

Professional ratings
Review scores
Source	Rating
Allmusic	2.5/5 stars

Windmills is the debut solo album by country rock musician Rick Roberts. The album was recorded a year after his stint as lead singer of The Flying Burrito Brothers, and two years before co-founding the band Firefall.

Roberts was joined on the record by Burrito Brothers bandmate Chris Hillman, as well as three of the Eagles: Don Henley, Bernie Leadon (formerly of the Burrito Brothers), and Randy Meisner. Other guest musicians include David Crosby, Jackson Browne, Al Perkins, Dallas Taylor, Marc Benno and Byron Berline. The standout tracks are "Sail Away", "In My Own Small Way", and "Jenny's Blues", and all of the songs were written by Roberts, except Harlan Howard's "Pick Me Up on Your Way Down".

== Track listing ==
1. "Deliver Me" (Roberts) - 4:51
2. "Davy McVie" (Roberts) - 3:45
3. "In My Own Small Way" (Roberts) - 2:57
4. "Sail Away" (Roberts) - 7:17
5. "Two Lovely Women" (Roberts) - 4:39
6. "In a Dream" (Roberts) - 4:12
7. "Drunk and Dirty" (Roberts) - 3:42
8. "Pick Me Up on Your Way Down" (Harlan Howard) - 2:53
9. "Jenny's Blues" (Roberts) - 3:46

== Personnel ==
- Rick Roberts - guitar, lead vocals, choir
- Bernie Leadon - banjo, guitar, harmony vocals, choir
- Don Henley - drums, harmony vocals, choir
- Al Perkins - steel guitar, guitar
- Chris Hillman - bass
- Randy Meisner - bass, choir
- Byron Berline - fiddle
- Dallas Taylor - drums
- Joe Lala - percussion
- David Crosby - harmony vocals
- Jackson Browne - harmony vocals
- Mother Hen - piano, harmony vocals
- Mike Utley - organ
- Marc Benno - guitar
- Leland Sklar - bass

== Production ==
- Producer: David Anderle
- Recording Engineer: Richard Moore/Kent Nebergall
- Art Direction: unknown
- Photography: unknown
- Liner Notes: unknown
