= Jane Getz =

American musician

- Born: 12 September 1942 (age 84)
- Occupation: Musician
- Instrument: Piano
- Years active: 1964–present

Jane Getz (born 12 September 1942) is an American jazz pianist and session musician, who learned classical piano as a child, and began playing jazz at the age of nine. She lived in California early in life, but moved to New York City when she was sixteen. She found work with Pony Poindexter and later performed with Charles Mingus, Herbie Mann, Stan Getz, Roland Kirk, Jay Clayton, Charles Lloyd, and Pharoah Sanders. She is not related to saxophonist Stan Getz.

In the early 1970s, Getz returned to Los Angeles and became a studio musician. She recorded country music for RCA under the name "Mother Hen" and appeared on albums by The Bee Gees, Ringo Starr, Harry Nilsson, Rick Roberts, and John Lennon. She wrote the title track for the 1973 Jimmie Spheeris album The Original Tap Dancing Kid.

Getz went into semi-retirement but began playing jazz again in the 1990s. She was a member of Dale Fielder's quartet in Los Angeles in 1995. Her first jazz album as a leader, No Relation, was released in 1996.

Getz' autobiography Runnin' with the Big Dogs was published in 2014.

== Discography ==
=== As leader ===
- Mother Hen (1971)
- No Ordinary Child (1972)
- "Survival of the Hippest"/"Stopping Traffic" 45 rpm single (1986)
- No Relation (1996)
- A Dot on the Map (2014)
- Go Back to Your Wife (2018)

=== As sidewoman ===
With Harry Nilsson

- 1974 Pussy Cats
- 1975 Duit on Mon Dei
- 1976 ...That's the Way It Is

With Jimmie Spheeris

- 1973 The Original Tap Dancing Kid
- 1975 The Dragon Is Dancing

With Ringo Starr

- 1976 Ringo's Rotogravure
- 1981 Stop and Smell the Roses

With others

- 1964 Right Now: Live at the Jazz Workshop, Charles Mingus (Fantasy)
- 1965 Pharoah's First, Pharoah Sanders
- 1967 Musart, George Braith
- 1970 Outlaw, Eugene McDaniels (Gene McDaniels)
- 1972 Windmills, Rick Roberts
- 1973 Life in a Tin Can, Bee Gees
- 1976 Motion, Geoff Muldaur
- 1998 Bop Head, Dave Pike
- 2008 Introducing J'Ai Michel, Sweet Baby J'ai
