= Just Remember I Love You =

Single by Firefall

from the album Luna Sea
- B-side: "Just Think"
- Released: July 21, 1977
- Genre: Folk rock
- Length: 3:16
- Label: Atlantic
- Songwriter: Rick Roberts
- Producer: Jim Mason

Firefall singles chronology
"Cinderella" (1977)	"Just Remember I Love You" (1977)	"So Long" (1978)

"Just Remember I Love You" is a song by American rock band Firefall from their second studio album, Luna Sea (1977), with backing vocals by Timothy B. Schmit. It was written by Rick Roberts and released as a single on July 21, 1977.

"Just Remember I Love You" peaked at number 11 on the US Billboard Hot 100 the week of November 19, 1977, spent two weeks at number nine on Cashbox, and reached number one on the US Easy Listening chart. The song also reached number one on the Canadian Adult Contemporary chart.

== Track listings ==
7" single Atlantic 3420

1. "Just Remember I Love You" – 3:14
2. "Just Think" - 4:11

== Chart performance ==
=== Weekly charts ===
Chart (1977–78)	Peak position
Canada RPM Top Singles	6
Canada RPM Adult Contemporary	1
U.S. Billboard Hot 100	11
U.S. Billboard Easy Listening	1
U.S. Cash Box Top 100	9

=== Year-end charts ===
Chart (1977)	Rank
Canada Top Singles	73

== See also ==
- List of number-one adult contemporary singles of 1977 (U.S.)
