= Larry Burnett =

American singer and guitarist (born 1951)

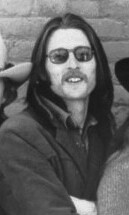
Burnett in 1977

Larry Burnett is an American singer and guitarist who was one of the original members of the pop-rock group Firefall.

== Early years and Firefall ==
Burnett was born on November 8, 1951, and wrote his first song when he was sixteen. Prior to joining Firefall, he was a professional cab driver in Alexandria, Virginia, a suburb of Washington, DC, while occasionally performing at the city's legendary Cellar Door nightclub. It was there that Burnett first met Firefall founder Rick Roberts. In August 1974, Roberts asked Burnett to join the band and sent Burnett a one-way plane ticket to Boulder, Colorado. The band, including Burnett, singer/guitarist Roberts, Mark Andes (bass), Michael Clarke (drums), and Jock Bartley (guitar), developed a pop-rock-midwest country sound, in the tradition of Crosby, Stills and Nash, the Byrds and the Eagles' early recordings.

After over a year of writing, rehearsing and performing throughout Colorado, Firefall began recording their eponymous debut album for Atlantic Records which would be released in 1976. Success came quickly for Firefall, touring with such acts as The Band, Doobie Brothers and Fleetwood Mac, Firefall became Atlantic's fastest album to sell 500,000 copies. Larry would sing and play guitar on Firefall's first five albums including their self-titled 1976 debut, the follow-up Luna Sea (1977), and subsequent Elan (1978), Undertow (1979), and Clouds Across the Sun (1980). His songwriting credits for the band include "Piece of Paper", "Love Isn't All", "Wrong Side of Town", and "Cinderella", which charted at #34 on Billboard in 1977.

== Post-Firefall and rehab ==
Larry left Firefall in April 1981 while the band was on tour. His struggle with drugs began when he was sixteen and with Firefall's success, he was able to further fuel his addiction. But the non-stop recording and touring coupled with increasing drug use began taking a physical toll on Burnett. According to Burnett's website, "I began to believe I would die if I stayed with this one more day. The band got up one morning after a show in Orlando FL, headed to the airport and got on a plane for Nevada. I got on one for Washington DC (my home) and checked myself into a psychiatric hospital's drug rehab unit." Burnett's battle to end his drug addiction lasted four years. His last drink and drug was August 1985.

In 1995, Brother Phelps, formerly of Kentucky Headhunters, covered Burnett's composition, "Cinderella," on their second CD, Any Way the Wind Blows. In 2010, the Burnett-penned "Learn the Dance" was covered by singer-songwriter JD Pederson on Pederson's third CD, It Seems Like Only Yesterday.

== Recovery and return to music ==
During the late 1980s and early 1990s, Burnett became a popular Washington, DC, disc jockey for classic rock station 105.9 WCXR. He was also the host and producer of a weekly specialty program heard on the station called "The Blues Room."

Burnett resisted the urge to produce music for several more years opting for a more "normal life". He dabbled in a variety of careers including real estate, sales and copywriting until, in August 2004, Burnett released his first solo ep entitled Confidence Game. Recorded in Denver, Colorado, and made up of five new acoustic Burnett compositions, Confidence Game also included an acoustic retake of his most well-known song from Firefall, "Cinderella". According to Burnett, "Music will not leave one alone if it is truly a gift... I believe mine is just that. A gift. I didn't come up with it, but it is uniquely mine. Not nice to keep it to myself..."

In April 2008, Burnett joined the current iteration of Firefall as well as other former members including bassist Mark Andes, saxophonist David Muse and percussionist Joe Lala for a sold-out Firefall reunion concert at the Boulder Theater in Boulder, Colorado. Founding member Rick Roberts was also present during the reunion, but was unable to perform. As of 2015, Jock Bartley, David Muse, and Mark Andes were the band's remaining original members until Muse's death in 2022.

Larry Burnett's most recent release as a solo artist is 2009's Guitars and Vocals. The CD also features Burnett's musical partner Don Chapman on backing vocals and accompanying guitar, with whom Burnett regularly performs live in concert. Recorded in Virginia, Guitars and Vocals includes remakes of several tracks from Confidence Game as well as several new compositions, all written by Larry Burnett.
