= Runaway Love =

Runaway Love may refer to:

- Runaway Love (EP), an EP by En Vogue
  - "Runaway Love" (En Vogue song), the title song
- "Runaway Love" (Firefall song)
- "Runaway Love" (Ludacris song)
- "Runaway Love" (Linda Clifford song)
- "Runaway Love", a song by Justin Bieber
- "Runaway Love", a song by Alice Gold
