= You Are the Woman =

- Side-A label of the US vinyl single

Single by Firefall

from the album Firefall
- B-side: "Sad Ol' Love Song"
- Released: August 1976
- Genre: Soft rock
- Length: 2:45
- Label: Atlantic
- Songwriter: Rick Roberts
- Producer: Jim Mason

Firefall singles chronology
"Livin' Ain't Livin'" (1976)	"You Are the Woman" (1976)	"Cinderella" (1977)

"You Are the Woman" is a song by Firefall, released as the second single from their self-titled debut album. Written by Rick Roberts, then the group's frontman, the track is distinguished by the performance on flute of Firefall member David Muse and vocals by Rick Roberts.

== Background ==
Roberts would recall writing "You Are the Woman": "When that chorus and tune jumped into my head I realized I was [not] creating...one of the great works of art in history...[but rather] a bouncy little pop ditty...I was stumped for several months about where the verses should go [ie. develop] lyrically. Then I realized I was over thinking it. I took a more simple approach, and the verses were finished in a day or two."

== Release ==
Introduced on Firefall, the band's debut album recorded at Miami's Criteria Studios and released in August 1976, "You Are the Woman" was issued as the album's second single that summer after several other tracks had received airplay on FM radio including the lead single "Livin' Ain't Livin'", which had just missed the top 40 of the Billboard Hot 100. After two months of support in smaller markets, "You Are the Woman" broke in such larger areas as Chicago and Houston in October 1976, effecting a top 40 entry with a subsequent ascent to a No. 9 peak that November, becoming the band's only top 10 hit to date. "You Are the Woman" also peaked at No. 6 on the Easy Listening chart. It also reached the top 20 in Canada and New Zealand.

== Reception ==
Jock Bartley of Firefall would account for the popularity of "You Are the Woman" thus: "Every female between the ages of 18 and 24 wanted to be the woman portrayed in the song, and that caused their boyfriends and spouses to call radio stations and subsequently flood the airwaves with dedications of the song and the sentiment. The message was simple and sincere, and the song was easy to sing. It was like our fans let us be a singing version of the Hallmark card that said what they weren't quite sure what to express."

Bartley also states: "Everybody knows 'You Are The Woman'. It ended up kind of being a hindrance because people would only hear 'You Are The Woman' and would think, oh, that light Rock band from Colorado. We're actually a pretty smokin' Rock band that really has fun onstage and cooks and jams and plays 'You Are The Woman' also."

== Chart performance ==
=== Weekly charts ===
Chart (1976–1977)	Peak position
Canada Top Singles (RPM)	6
Canada RPM Adult Contemporary	16
New Zealand (Recorded Music NZ)	17
U.S. Billboard Hot 100	9
U.S. Billboard Adult Contemporary	6
U.S. Cash Box Top 100	8

=== Year-end charts ===
Chart (1976)	Rank
Canada	79

Chart (1977)	Rank
American Top 40 Year-End	35
