= Playin' It Cool =

Studio album by Timothy B. Schmit
- Released: September 17, 1984
- Studio: Record One and Amigo Studios (Los Angeles, California); Redwing Studios (Tarzana, California)
- Genre: Rock; hard rock; pop rock
- Length: 33:07
- Label: Asylum
- Producer: Josh Leo; Timothy B. Schmit

Timothy B. Schmit chronology
Playin' It Cool (1984)	Timothy B. (1987)

Professional ratings
Review scores
Source	Rating
AllMusic	3/5 stars

Playin' It Cool is the debut solo studio album by American musician Timothy B. Schmit, the bass guitarist and co-lead vocalist for the Eagles. The album was released in 1984 on Asylum in the United States and Europe. The album features guest appearances from Don Henley, Joe Walsh, Steve Lukather, Carl Wilson, JD Souther and Rita Coolidge.

== Critical reception ==
Reviewing for AllMusic, critic Rob Theakston wrote of the album "The production on several of these tunes sound antiquated in comparison to the super glossed production of the mid-eighties; almost reminiscent of Schmit's tunes in the Eagles. It certainly doesn't help matters that many of his Southern California compadres (Henley, Carl Wilson, Joe Walsh and JD Souther) make guest appearances, leading to the notion that Playin' It Cool is an album that was several years in the making. It's not the worst of Eagles solo records, but it is certainly nowhere near the best either."

== Track listing ==
Side one
No.	Title	Writer(s)	Length
1.	"Playin' It Cool"	Josh Leo; Vince Melamed; Timothy B. Schmit; JD Souther	5:36
2.	"Lonely Girl"	Leo	3:59
3.	"So Much in Love"	Billy Jackson; Roy Stragis; George Williams	2:16
4.	"Something's Wrong"	Leo; Melamed; Schmit	4:09

Side two
No.	Title	Writer(s)	Length
5.	"Voices"	Schmit	1:38
6.	"Wrong Number"	Schmit; Scott Strong; Michael Towers	2:39
7.	"Take a Good Look Around You"	Schmit; Kenny Koch	3:21
8.	"Tell Me What You Dream"	Leo; Melamed; Schmit	4:47
9.	"Gimme the Money"	Leo; Schmit	4:40
Total length:			33:07

== Personnel ==
=== Musicians ===
- Timothy B. Schmit – vocals, bass (1–4, 8), backing vocals (1, 2, 4), guitars (5), percussion (7)
- Vince Melamed – keyboards (1, 2, 4, 6–8)
- David Paich – keyboards (6, 7), percussion (6)
- Michael Utley – organ (9)
- Josh Leo – guitars (1), percussion (2), backing vocals (2), first guitar solo (4, 9), acoustic guitar (7), rhythm guitar (9), bass (9), chorus harmony vocals (9)
- Steve Lukather – second and end guitar solos (4), guitars (6, 8), electric guitar (7)
- Joe Walsh – slide guitar (4), third guitar solo (4), second and end guitar solos (9)
- Bob Glaub – bass (6, 7)
- Craig Krampf – drums (1, 9), percussion (2)
- Harry Stinson – Simmons snare drum (2), Roland TR-808 (2)
- John Robinson – drums (3)
- Don Henley – percussion (2), drums (4), backing vocals (4)
- Jeff Porcaro – drums (6–8), percussion (6, 7), tambourine (8)
- Keith Knudsen – tambourine (9)
- Greg Smith – baritone saxophone (6)
- Bill Bergman – tenor saxophone (6)
- Jim Coile – tenor saxophone (6)
- Steve Allen – tenor saxophone (8)
- Sam Clayton – backing vocals (1)
- JD Souther – backing vocals (1, 6)
- Carl Wilson – backing vocals (2)
- Rita Coolidge – backing vocals (9)
- Max Gronenthal – backing vocals (9)
- David Lasley – backing vocals (9)

Cheers on "Playin' It Cool"

- Jean Cromie
- Carole Damien
- Debra Dobkin
- Joan Kreiss
- Jeddrah Schmit
- Jay Harris
- Renee Larose Leo
- Lindah K. Lauderbough

=== Production ===
- Josh Leo – producer (1, 4–9)
- Timothy B. Schmit – producer (1, 4–9), cover concept
- Russ Titleman – producer (3)
- Niko Bolas – recording (1, 2, 4–9), mixing
- Mark Linett – engineer (3)
- Richard Bosworth – second engineer, assistant engineer, mix assistant
- Denny Densmore – second engineer
- Larry Hinds – second engineer
- Bob Loftus – second engineer
- Duane Seykora – second engineer
- Ernie Sheesley – second engineer
- Wayne Tanouye – second engineer
- Joe Gastwirt – mastering at Oceanview Digital Mastering (Los Angeles, California)
- Dan Hersch – mastering assistant
- Bruce Ayers – cover concept
- Jean Cromie – cover concept
- Gary Burden – cover concept, art direction, design
- Jenice Heo – art direction, design
- Henry Diltz – photography

== Chart performance ==
=== Album ===
Chart (1984)	Peak position
US Billboard Top LPs	160

=== Singles ===
Single	Chart	Position
"So Much in Love"	Adult Contemporary	27
"So Much in Love"	Billboard Hot 100	59
"Playin' It Cool"	Billboard Hot 100	101
