= Timothy B =

Studio album by Timothy B. Schmit
- Released: September 7, 1987
- Studio: The Studio (Woodland Hills, Los Angeles); Zebra Studio (Studio City, Los Angeles); Robert Irving Studios and Bossa Nova Hotel (Los Angeles, California)
- Genre: Rock; pop rock; soft rock
- Length: 43:19
- Label: MCA
- Producer: Richard Rudolph; Bruce Gaitsch

Timothy B. Schmit chronology
Playin' It Cool (1984)	Timothy B (1987)	Tell Me the Truth (1990)

Singles from Timothy B
- 1. "Boys Night Out" Released: 1987; 2. "Don't Give Up" Released: 1988

Professional ratings
Review scores
Source	Rating
AllMusic	link

Timothy B is the second solo studio album by American musician Timothy B. Schmit, the bassist and co-lead vocalist for the Eagles. The album was released on September 7, 1987, by MCA Records in the United States and Europe, three years after Schmit's previous solo studio album, Playin' It Cool (1984) and seven years after the demise of the Eagles. The album peaked at No. 106 on the Billboard 200 chart, and the single, "Boys Night Out", hit No. 25 on the Billboard Hot 100 chart, becoming Schmit's best selling single. The album was mostly produced by Richard Rudolph with co-production by Bruce Gaitsch.

== Background ==
When Schmit was asked about why there were less notable musicians compared to his last album, he said "I decided to stay out of the real glamour studios and to keep the clientele down too. I did it on purpose mainly for less distractions. I mean I really knew what I wanted to do on this album and I decided purposely not to use my famous and semi-famous friends just to have it be more of what I can do on my own. And that's really the reason."

== Critical reception ==
Reviewing for AllMusic, critic Bruce Eder wrote of the album "The tunes and the songs are good enough, and Schmit is in superb voice, and you have to love the luminous guitar sound in evidence throughout. But it's all a little reminiscent of what happened to the Eagles once they became a top arena act -- all of a sudden, their sound started to get bigger and heavier than their music could carry comfortably."

== Track listing ==
All tracks are written by Bruce Gaitsch, Will Jennings and Timothy B. Schmit, except where noted.

No.	Title	Writer(s)	Length
1.	"Boys Night Out"		4:36
2.	"Don't Give Up"	Timothy B. Schmit	3:57
3.	"Hold Me in Your Heart"		4:42
4.	"Everybody Needs a Lover"		4:30
5.	"Into the Night"	Schmit	4:37
6.	"A Better Day is Coming"		4:29
7.	"Jazz Street"		4:15
8.	"I Guess We'll Go on Living"		5:32
9.	"Down Here People Dance Forever"		6:27
Total length:			43:19

== Personnel ==
Musicians

- Timothy B. Schmit – vocals, backing vocals (1, 9), bass (2), cymbals (9)
- Bruce Gaitsch – programming, guitars
- Randy Waldman – keyboards (2), acoustic piano (4, 6, 7), trumpet (7), synthesizers (8)
- Robert Irving – keyboards (2)
- Alan Kendall – guitars
- Jonathan Moffett – cymbals (1, 3, 9), percussion (6)
- Jim Horn – baritone saxophone (9)
- Larry Williams – tenor saxophone (9)
- Gary Grant – trumpet (9)
- Jerry Hey – trumpet (9), horn arrangements (9)
- Siedah Garrett – backing vocals (1, 9), chorus backing vocals (7)
- Julia Waters – backing vocals (1, 9)

Production

- Richard Rudolph – producer, additional engineer
- Bruce Gaitsch – co-producer, engineer
- Robert Irving – additional engineer
- Robbie Weaver – additional engineer
- Bud Rizzo – assistant engineer
- Bill Bottrell – mixing at Smoketree Ranch (Chatsworth, California)
- Bob Fudjinski – mix assistant
- Doug Parry – mix assistant
- Bernie Grundman – mastering at Bernie Grundman Mastering (Hollywood, California)
- Jeff Adamoff – art direction
- Ron Larson – design
- Randee St. Nicholas – photography
- Front Line Management – management

== Chart performance ==
Album

Chart (1987)	Peak position
US Billboard 200	106

Singles

Single	Chart	Position
"Boys Night Out"	Mainstream Rock	17
"Boys Night Out"	Billboard Hot 100	25
"Boys Night Out"	Canadian Singles Chart	69
"Don't Give Up"	Canadian Adult Contemporary Chart	22
"Don't Give Up"	Adult Contemporary	30
