= Firefall =

American rock band

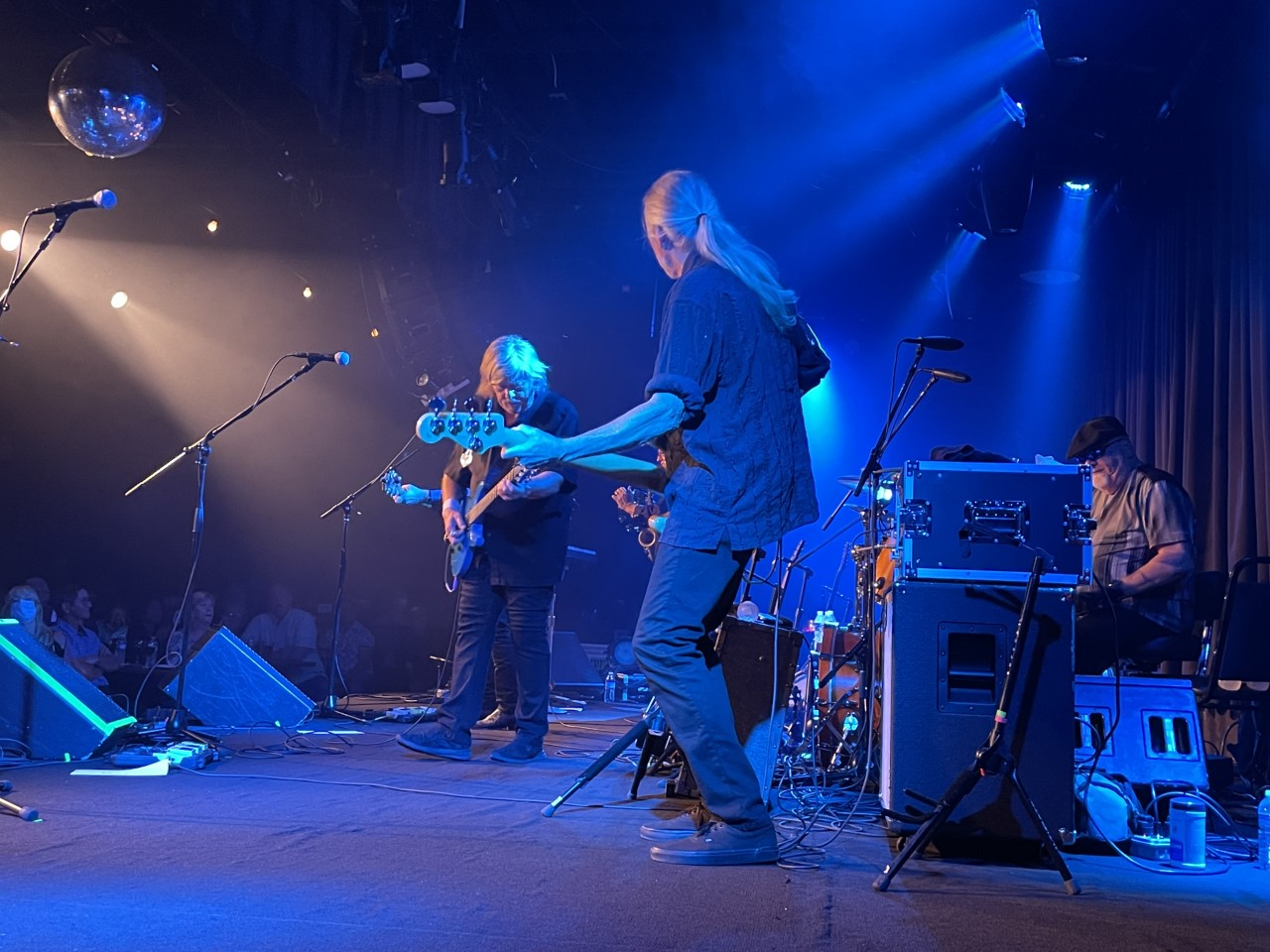
- Firefall in 2021

Background information
- Origin: Boulder, Colorado, U.S.
- Genres: Country rock, pop rock, soft rock
- Years active: 1974–present
- Label: Atlantic
- Members: Jock Bartley; John Bisaha; Sandy Ficca; Steve Weinmeister; Jim Waddell
- Past members: Rick Roberts; Larry Burnett; Mark Andes; Michael Clarke; David Muse; George Hawkins; Tris Imboden; Kim Stone; Johnne Sambataro; Chuck Kirkpatrick; Scott Kirkpatrick; Greg Overton; Steve Hadjoupolos; Bob Gaffney; Mark Oblinger; Dan Clawson; Bruce Crichton; Steve Manshel; Bil Hopkins; Bray Ghiglia; Jim Waddell; Bob Fisher; Jace Hill; Gary Jones
- Website: firefallofficial.com

Firefall is an American soft rock band that formed in Boulder, Colorado, in 1974. It was founded by Rick Roberts, former member of the Flying Burrito Brothers, and Jock Bartley, who had been Tommy Bolin's replacement in Zephyr. Other members have included Mark Andes, Larry Burnett, David Muse, and Michael Clarke, the latter also formerly of the Flying Burrito Brothers and an original member of the Byrds.

The band's biggest hit single, "You Are the Woman", peaked at No. 9 on the Billboard Hot 100 in 1976. Other hits included "Just Remember I Love You" (#11 in 1977), "Strange Way" (#11 in 1978), "Cinderella" (#34 in 1977), "Headed for a Fall" (#35 in 1980), and "Staying with It" (#37 in 1981).

== History ==
In 1973 Rick Roberts and Jock Bartley met when Bartley was on tour with Gram Parsons as a member of his backing band, the Fallen Angels. Both the Fallen Angels and Roberts were performing in New York City at the same venue on consecutive nights. After the two were reunited in Boulder, Colorado, Roberts was impressed by Bartley's guitar work, and the duo soon began practicing together. Encouraged to form a band, they contacted bassist Mark Andes (a former member of the California bands Spirit and Jo Jo Gunne) who had temporarily retired to the mountains outside Boulder, and singer/ guitarist/ composer Larry Burnett (whom Roberts had met in his travels earlier that year). After Andes and Burnett joined in 1974, the band was called Firefall.

Roberts got the name from the Yosemite Firefall at Yosemite National Park in California. The owners of a hotel threw burning logs off a mountain in a cascade as an annual event to entertain the guests.

Guitarist/keyboardist Mark Hallman was another musician considered for Firefall, but Hallman rejected the offer and remained with his band Navarro. The drummer was Michael Clarke, who had been a member of The Byrds and The Flying Burrito Brothers.

=== Breakthrough and success ===
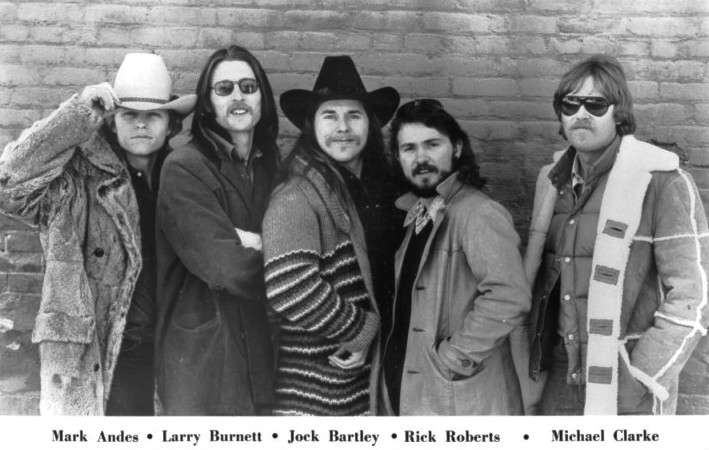
The group in 1977

In 1975 Firefall recorded a demo tape consisting of three songs produced by Chris Hillman. Andes, Bartley and Roberts were then brought into Hillman's band. Before scheduled performances at The Other End in New York City in June 1975, Hillman became ill and was unable to play all the shows. Burnett and Clarke were then flown in to complete the commitments as Firefall. A&R representatives from Atlantic Records, who had already heard the band's demo tape, saw the Other End shows and signed Firefall to a multi-album contract. During the summer, when the contract was signed, Roberts was playing as a member of Stephen Stills's band, so work on the band's first album was delayed until late 1975. Roberts' high school friend David Muse was brought in before recording at Criteria Studios in Miami. The producer was Jim Mason, who had worked with the band Poco.

The album Firefall was recorded in one month and released in April 1976. The group's first single, "Livin' Ain't Livin'", stopped short of the Top 40 on the Billboard Hot 100. And during the following months, the band toured with Leon Russell, the Doobie Brothers, Tom Waits, Lynyrd Skynyrd, Roy Buchanan, Electric Light Orchestra and The Band, and were also on a bill that included Willie Nelson, Jerry Jeff Walker, and Asleep at the Wheel.

The band's next single, "You Are the Woman", reached the Top 10, and the band toured with Fleetwood Mac, who were at the beginning of their commercial peak. Another single, "Cinderella", was played extensively on FM radio but did not fare as well on AM, barely reaching the Top 40.

Firefall returned to Criteria Studios to record their second album, which was to be titled Tropical Nights. They were joined by the Memphis Horns and percussionist Joe Lala, a member of Manassas who had played on Firefall's debut album. But after hearing the final mix, Atlantic Records decided that the album needed to be reworked. With Jim Mason producing again, Firefall worked on the album that was renamed Luna Sea, a pun on "lunacy", and released in July 1977. The album peaked at No. 27 on the Billboard chart and was certified gold two months after its release. The single "Just Remember I Love You", with backing vocals by Timothy B. Schmit, reached No. 11 on the Billboard Hot 100.

In a 2012 interview, Roberts recalled what was going on at this time: "Our business managers at that time were Dottie Ross and Mick Schneider, who operated as D&M Management. Although we didn't know it, it would appear that Mick Schneider had his own designs on managing the band. I can't really prove that, but he had been filling the gap as our de facto manager ever since we had parted company with our last official guy and he was getting pretty comfortable calling the shots. Mick Fleetwood got interested in taking over after we had been touring as an opening act for Fleetwood Mac on their Rumours tour. We entered into a spoken agreement with him and he went to work restructuring our recording contract with Atlantic Records. Things happened during that time that made it an unworkable arrangement. The first thing probably went a good way towards undermining any chance of a healthy working relationship with Mick. The band went to his house in Bel Air, California one day to try and hash out a written agreement. It was summertime, so we all went out and sat down around the pool. Present were all the members of the band as well as Mick, his road manager and confidant John Courage and his lawyer, Nick Shapiro. As we started to go through the proposed contract, the band started to function in their usual fashion; disputing every second word and generally being impossible to deal with. We had a very bad habit of that in almost all our business dealings. We also seemed to find a way to make the very worst possible decision at every opportunity. It took us about two hours of haggling to get through the first seven or so paragraphs. Mick's lawyer was obviously getting frustrated by the nit picking and we were all getting a little short tempered. The second thing that happened was a lot more serious and probably dealt the killing blow. After Mick had gotten Atlantic to agree to restructure our contract with a sizable cash advance ($500,000 I think) and an increase in the percentage points, Mick Schneider rejected it as not being satisfactory! At that point, Mick (Fleetwood) decided that maybe managing Firefall was not in his best interests. As a result, we went for about another year and a half without an official manager and Mick Schneider stayed in nominal control. We were not the easiest band to work with at any time and considering the fatigue factor, we were probably raging jerks and for all the chart success we had achieved, we were hardly making a decent living. We were mostly serving as an opening act on a lot of 'A' list tours, and as such, we weren't being paid like a band with an unbroken string of gold and platinum albums and more than a half dozen straight top fifty singles. It was nice to be doing shows in sold-out arenas every night, but going home after the tour was over with hardly anything in your pocket dulled the thrill a little. That only increased the tension in the band."

In 1978 the band brought in Tom Dowd to produce their third album, Élan, recording at Criteria and at the Record Plant in Los Angeles. The band and Dowd got along well but they had conflicting musical visions. The differences were apparently noticeable enough that the band's management, with help from their friend Mick Fleetwood, pressured the record label into letting them rework the album. It put the group in debt with the label, and within the year they parted ways with their management. The production team of Ron and Howard Albert were brought in to finish the record. Élan, released in October 1978, became their first album to reach platinum status. The hit single "Strange Way" continued the band's commercial hot streak.

=== Decline ===
After two years of non-stop recording and touring, the band was burned out and their financial situation was unstable. During a tour of Japan in August 1979, Michael Clarke, because of his excessive drinking, missed gigs or showed up in no condition to play. The band resorted to hiring a German drummer, Dan Holsten, whose playing technique was similar to Clarke's, to sub. Holsten, who even looked a lot like Clarke, had played in several other bands in the Colorado area and caught the eye of Jock and Larry one night at a Colorado Springs bar. He became known as a reliable back-up drummer for tours and some studio work.

Despite it all, Atlantic Records still expected a new album. The band recorded the album sporadically over a year. The Alberts were again brought in to produce the album. But the work once again required a second effort, which was produced by Kyle Lehning. The result, titled Undertow, was released in March 1980. It would be the last album with the original lineup. Upon completion of the album, Clarke and Mark Andes both left the band. Thirteen years later, in December 1993, Clarke died of alcoholism at his home in Treasure Island, Florida.

Andes and Clarke were replaced by Kenny Loggins' former rhythm section, consisting of bassist George Hawkins and drummer Tris Imboden. With the two new players, the band recorded Clouds Across the Sun, which was released in December 1980, and spawned the early 1981 hit "Staying with It", which was done as a duet with singer Lisa Nemzo. Clouds saw Jock emerging more as a writer and singer and had the band moving more away from their "country rock" direction.

Hawkins resigned from the group in late 1980 to join up with Mick Fleetwood's The Visitor, a side project the Fleetwood Mac drummer was recording in Africa. After Andes returned to guest for the group's February 1981 appearance on American Bandstand, Kim Stone came in to take over bass.

Larry Burnett suddenly disappeared from the group, after playing a show at Miami Baseball Stadium with Heart, Blue Öyster Cult, Motörhead and Freewheel on April 19, 1981, to return to his hometown of Washington, D.C. to enter rehab. (Burnett eventually kicked a serious drug habit and after working in radio in the late 80s/early 90s, began pursuing a solo career in 2004.) The group continued on to play their next show in Las Vegas without him. But after playing a concert with the band in Lahaina, Hawaii with Pure Prairie League in August, Rick Roberts announced that he also was leaving for a solo career. With the band lacking personnel and increasing in financial debt, Atlantic dropped Firefall from their roster in 1981 and released Best of Firefall at the close of the year.

Since his departure from Firefall, Roberts has continued to tour on occasion. In the fall of 1981, he played dates in tandem with fellow former Burrito Brother Chris Hillman. In 1985 he was in a Twentieth Anniversary Byrds Tribute band with former Byrds Gene Clark and Michael Clarke. In 1987–89, Roberts teamed up with ex-Eagle Randy Meisner in the short lived Roberts Meisner Band, and after a return spell in Firefall (1989–1992), he was sidelined for health reasons for a number of years before returning to the road as a solo act. In the summer and fall of 2019, he toured together with fellow Firefaller Larry Burnett.

=== Resumption and later work ===
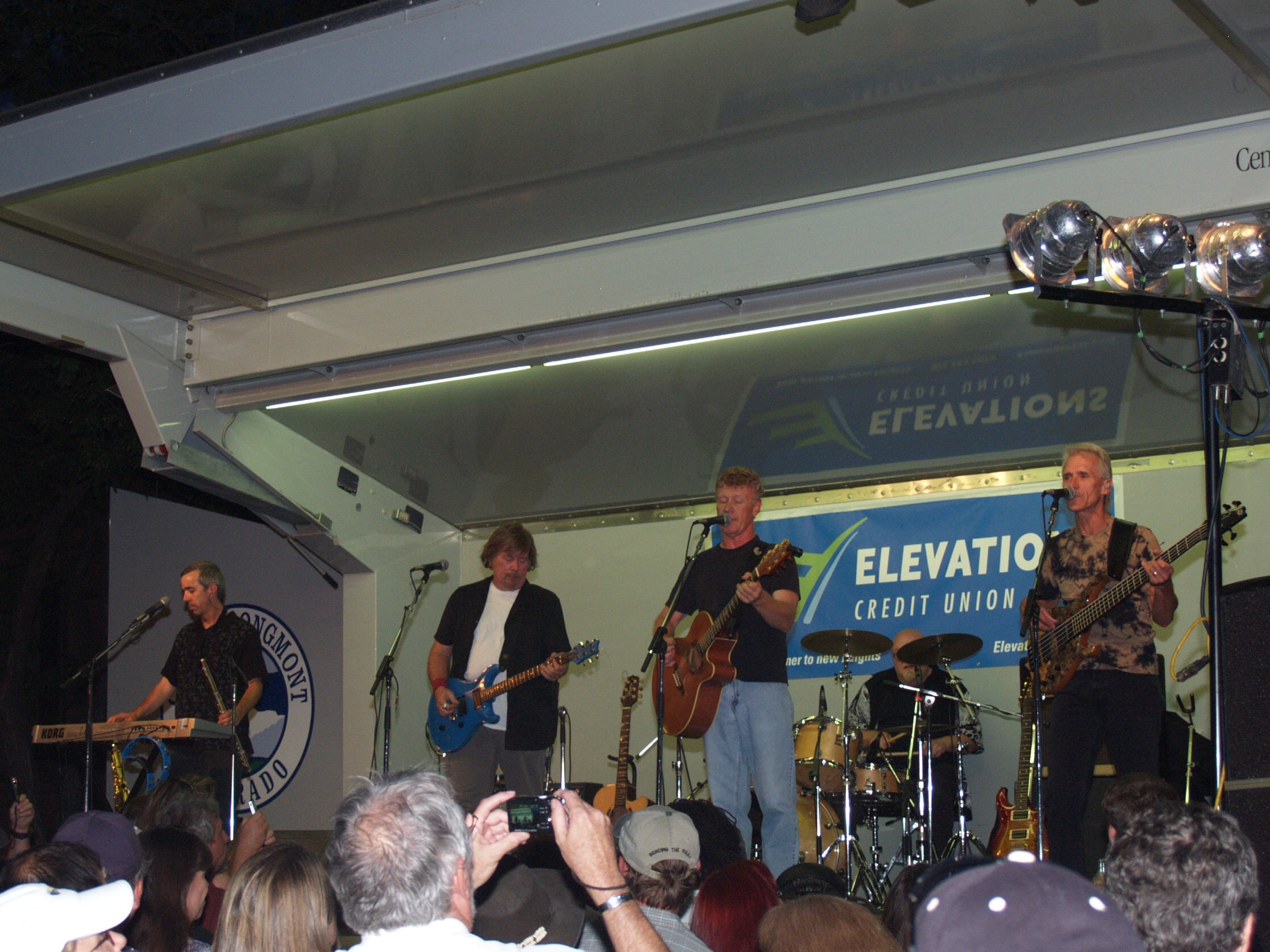
Firefall in 2010

Meanwhile, unhappy with the way things had turned out, Jock Bartley decided to put together a new Firefall lineup in the spring of 1982. At Ron Albert's suggestion, Bartley got together with two Miami-based musicians, Johnne Sambataro (during the '70s and '80s, he adopted the conventional spelling of John for his first name) and Chuck Kirkpatrick. Sambataro was a singer/guitarist/keyboardist/bassist/songwriter who had sung on record with Stephen Stills, Eric Clapton, Dave Mason, McGuinn, Clark & Hillman, the members of the Bee Gees and many others. Johnne and Jock had actually met back in 1978 when they both played on the Criteria sessions for Andy Gibb's platinum album Shadow Dancing. Kirkpatrick was a singer–guitarist–keyboardist who had sung with Johnne on a number of the aforementioned sessions and had worked as an engineer at Criteria on such albums as Derek & The Dominos' Layla and Other Assorted Love Songs.

Albert then brought in Alan Jacobi, a Miami entertainment lawyer who had a relationship with Atlantic, and Jacobi convinced the label to help resign the band.

So in the summer of 1982, Criteria sessions for the Break of Dawn LP began with Ron and brother Howard producing once again. Backing Bartley, Sambataro and Kirkpatrick were a number of Miami session players, with Stephen Stills and Rick Roberts making guest appearances. The album appeared in September 1982 and Bartley, Johnne and Chuck began auditioning additional players for a follow-up tour. Chuck's brother Scott (a top-notch session drummer who, like Johnne, had also played on record and toured with McGuinn, Clark & Hillman) and Colorado bassist Greg Overton were chosen and, at the last minute, David Muse decided to rejoin the band.

In the winter of 1983, Firefall set out across the U.S. to promote Break of Dawn. But the single from it, "Always", failed to reach the Top 40 and quickly fell off the chart. Mirror of the World followed in November 1983, the title track a comment on the effects of TV violence on children. The album had a much harder edge than its predecessors, with more of an emphasis on an '80s style synth/drum programmed production, which many of the group's fans thought reflected too great a departure from the classic Firefall sound. Though the first single, the rocking "Runaway Love", written by Bartley, Sambataro, and Paul Crosta, briefly appeared in a video on MTV and received limited radio airplay, this album too failed to attract sales and quickly disappeared.

The group, once again dropped by Atlantic, nevertheless continued to tour, headlining in smaller clubs and opening in larger venues for groups like the Beach Boys, Little River Band, and Bob Seger & the Silver Bullet Band.

In 1983, Overton quit (he would return briefly to play a few shows with the group in Medford, Oregon in July 1986 as a fill-in) and Muse decided to retire from touring again. Steve Hadjoupolos (sax, flute, keyboards, backing vocals) and Bob Gaffney (bass, vocals) were brought in and the group continued. Sandy Ficca was brought in to take over from Scott Kirkpatrick on drums in October 1984 (Scott then returned to play some final shows with the band in June 1985 before moving on permanently) and is still with them to-date.

On the evening of August 4, 1986, Chuck Kirkpatrick was leaving from a local club gig in the area of Florida where he resided. After breaking down on the road home, he was shot and wounded in the arm in a drive-by shooting; the shooter then fled the scene. The wound was serious enough to almost require amputation of Kirkpatrick's left arm, but doctors were able to save it and Chuck was able to play again after a difficult rehab period. Many Miami musicians, including Jon Secada and members of the Miami Sound Machine, came to Chuck's aid, playing a series of shows to help defray the cost of his medical care and rehab. Firefall brought in Colorado musician Mark Oblinger to sit in for Chuck until he was able to return to the band in November 1986. But Kirkpatrick's tenure in the band was coming to an end. In late 1987, Gaffney left and Eddie Gleason came on in the interim. Then Chuck left at the tail end of 1987 after differences with Jock Bartley. Oblinger (who had subbed for both Chuck and Gaffney in 1986) returned as Kirkpatrick's permanent replacement in December 1987 and Bil Hopkins was the new bassist. Dan Clawson (ex-Pure Prairie League) came in as well to take the place of Hadjoupolos in early 1988 (Hadjoupolos died in 1991 after a bout with cancer).

In 1989, after seven years in Firefall, Sambataro decided it was also time to say goodbye. He moved on to join Dion DiMucci's band. This paved the way for the return of Rick Roberts and in September 1992, Rhino Records responded to the demand to put out Firefall music on CD by releasing Firefall: The Greatest Hits, which featured all of the singles and AOR favorites and one new song, "Run Run Away", about adult victims of earlier child abuse.

In the early/mid 1990s, the personnel shuffles continued. Roberts, who was suffering from health troubles, left again in the spring of 1992 to be replaced by Bruce Crichton, who turned it over to Steve Manshel in June 1993. Mark Oblinger departed as well and Steven Weinmeister came on board in May 1993. And after Dan Clawson left that same year, there were several people to occupy the woodwind–keyboards chair, including Bray Ghiglia (1993–1994), the returning David Muse (1994–1995; 2000–2003; 2011–2022), Jim Waddell (1993; 1995–96; 1998–2000; 2003; 2022–present), Bob Fisher (1996–1998; 2007) and Chris Ball (2003–2011).

While touring in 1993, Firefall encountered the Flood of 1993. One of their gigs was cancelled and a few had to be moved to higher ground. In response Jock wrote "When The River Rises", a song with an upbeat message of finding strength in adversity. The band recorded the song in Colorado Springs at Startsong Recording Studio, with engineer–programmer Tom Gregor co-producing with Bartley. "When The River Rises" was then brought back to St. Louis and played on the radio for the first time. At that point, the flood waters had still not crested. Vowing to donate a large portion of the publishing to flood relief, the song was sent to other radio stations in the flooded areas. It received heavy regional airplay and was also used by CNN and other TV stations behind coverage of the disaster.

With the band's profile raised, the search for a new record deal began. Some smaller companies showed interest. They decided to go with an independent Colorado based label, Redstone Records, who had had some successes in the smooth jazz genre. Messenger was recorded in Denver and Boulder and was released in September 1994. Bartley had been stockpiling songs for ten years for just this opportunity. Bil Hopkins's song "Say It's Over" (written with Mark Oblinger) and Steve Manshel's "Innocent Victim" also appeared on the CD. Mark Andes and Richie Furay made guest appearances on the album and Jim Mason returned to the producer's chair. Messenger was much more diverse than anything the band had released to date with the usual love songs and ballads, but there were also songs about child abuse, environmental catastrophe and even sexual abuse/rape in the chilling "No Means No". The first single, "Love Find A Way", received some minor play on some stations, but Redstone did not have the distribution clout to get the CD into all stores, so overall sales were disappointing.

Manshel, who had begun to take time off from the group to work on a solo album, left altogether in September 1999 to pursue his own career and the band reverted to a five-piece. Other than short-term fill-ins (Steve Jenks subbed for Hopkins in the spring and summer of 1998 and Gary Jones sat in for Weinmeister — who had a previous obligation to play a wedding in Belize — for a Firefall gig on November 12, 1999, opening for Journey at the Warfield Theatre in San Francisco and one for Hopkins in June 2002), Bartley, Weinmeister, Hopkins, and Sandy Ficca continued on as Firefall from late 1999 until Hopkins left in 2014.

From 2005 on, Firefall would sometimes play a handful of shows annually as "Acoustic Firefall" in various combinations, with the most common being the trio of Jock, Steve, and Bil. And on April 9, 2008, at Boulder Theater in Boulder, Colorado, there was a Firefall reunion concert that featured the current lineup joined by Mark Andes, David Muse, Larry Burnett, and original Firefall studio percussionist Joe Lala. Rick Roberts attended the show as well but was unable to perform with the others because of health issues. As previously mentioned, Michael Clarke had died in 1993. The reunion appeared as the CD Firefall Reunion Live in February 2009. Since 2008, Jock's son, Jamey Crow Bartley, sometimes guests with the band on drums and will fill in for Sandy Ficca on occasion. During the summer of 2011, David Muse, who just survived a bout with non-Hodgkin lymphoma, returned to play shows with Firefall once again, alternating with Chris Ball before rejoining permanently.

Apart from Firefall, in 2012 original and then current Firefall members Jock Bartley and David Muse reunited with Rick Roberts and studio percussionist Joe Lala in the supergroup Boulder County Conspiracy. Other members of this band included Bobby Caldwell (Captain Beyond, Johnny Winter, Rick Derringer), Max Combs, Allen Carman, and Billy Sandlin. They toured throughout 2012 performing songs by Firefall, Captain Beyond, The Marshall Tucker Band, and Spirit as well as other originals and covers. They disbanded at the end of 2012.

In February 2014 founding member and bassist Mark Andes rejoined the band. In June 2014, Jace Hill (guitar and vocals) joined the band for a short spell to sub for Steven Weinmeister, who was back by early July. In November 2014, the Colorado Music Hall of Fame announced that Firefall would be among the 2014 inductees at a January 2015 event at the Paramount Theater in Denver. In late 2014, Steven Weinmeister departed Firefall after almost twenty two years but did return in January 2015 for the Colorado Music Hall of Fame induction and to sub for an ill Bartley later that same year for dates on the east coast, in August. He was succeeded by singer/guitarist Gary Jones (who had previously subbed for Weinmeister for the one aforementioned gig back in November 1999 and for a few other shows in September 2014).

By late 2014, Firefall's lineup was Jock Bartley, David Muse, Sandy Ficca, Mark Andes, and Gary Jones. On January 9, 2015 Firefall was inducted into the Colorado Music Hall of Fame with Poco, Nitty Gritty Dirt Band, Stephen Stills, and Manassas, at the Paramount Theater in Denver.

Former Firefall bass player (in 1980) George Hawkins died on October 26, 2018, after a bout with cancer. Yet another former Firefall bassist, Bob Gaffney, also passed on in 2018.

In August 2019 after Mark Andes was sidelined after a hip replacement, Lance Hoppen (of Orleans), John Trujillo (a bassist friend of Sandy Ficca's), and former Firefall member Steven Weinmeister filled in for him. The band released Comet, their first new album in nearly 20 years, and first with Sunset Blvd Records, on December 11, 2020. The album featured a lineup of Jock Bartley, Mark Andes, David Muse, Sandy Ficca and Gary Jones.

In 2021, Firefall again did some shows as a trio, this time with Bartley, Jones and a returning Steve Weinmeister on bass, who ended up returning to the group to replace Jones going forward.

In 2022, David Muse was sidelined from touring after having once again fallen ill with cancer, that took his life on August 6, 2022. Jim Waddell, who had first played with Firefall in 1993, returned to cover for Muse. In July 2022 after Mark Andes retired from the road, current Babys singer/bassist John Bisaha joined the lineup.

In 2023, Firefall announced that their latest album, Friends & Family, would feature classic songs from other 1970s bands, including the Doobie Brothers, Heart, Fleetwood Mac, Loggins and Messina, the Band, Marshall Tucker Band and more. It was released on September 22, with Friends & Family 2 following in May 2025.

== Members ==
=== Current members ===
- Jock Bartley – guitar, vocals (1974–present)
- Sandy Ficca – drums (1984–present)
- Steven Weinmeister – guitar, bass, mandolin, keyboards, vocals (1993–2014, 2022–present)
- Jim Waddell – keyboards, flute, saxophone (1993, 1995–1996, 1998–2000, 2003, 2022–present)
- John Bisaha – bass, vocals (2022–present)

=== Former members ===
- Rick Roberts – lead vocals, guitar (1974–1981, 1989–1992)
- Larry Burnett – lead vocals, guitar (1974–1981)
- Mark Andes - bass, vocals (1974–1980, 1981, 2014–2022)
- Michael Clarke – drums (1974–1980, died 1993)
- David Muse – keyboards, flute, saxophone (1975–1981, 1982–1983, 1994–1995, 2000–2003, 2011–2022; his death)
- Tris Imboden – drums (1980–1981)
- George Hawkins – bass, vocals (1980, died 2018)
- Kim Stone – bass, vocals (1981)
- Johnne Sambataro – lead vocals, guitar, keyboards (1982–1989)
- Chuck Kirkpatrick – guitar, keyboards, vocals (1982–1987)
- Greg Overton – bass, vocals (1982–1983)
- Scott Kirkpatrick – drums (1982–1984)
- Steve Hadjoupolos – keyboards, flute, saxophone (1983–1988)
- Bob Gaffney – bass, vocals (1983–1987)
- Mark Oblinger – guitar, keyboards, vocals (1987–1993)
- Bil Hopkins – bass, vocals (1987–2014)
- Dan Clawson – keyboards, flute, saxophone (1988–1993)
- Bruce Crichton – lead vocals, guitar (1992–1993)
- Steve Manshel – lead vocals, guitar (1993–1999)
- Bray Ghiglia – keyboards, flute, saxophone (1993–1994)
- Bob Fisher – keyboards, flute, saxophone (1996–1998, 2007)
- Chris Ball – keyboards, flute, saxophone (2003–2011)
- Gary Jones – guitar, keyboards, vocals (2014–2021)

=== Live substitutes ===
*Note: Current and former official band members who have served as a live substitute have the time of their substitution shown above.

- Dan Holsten – drums (1979)
- Eddie Gleason – bass, backing vocals (December 1987)
- Steve Jenks – bass, backing vocals (Summer 1998)
- Jamey Crow Bartley – drums (2008–present, occasionally)
- Jace Hill – guitar, vocals (June 2014)
- Lance Hoppen - bass, backing vocals (August 2019)
- John Trujillo - bass, backing vocals (August 2019)

=== Studio contributors ===
- Joe Lala – percussion

== Discography ==
=== Albums ===
- Firefall (Atlantic, 1976) U.S. No. 26, AUS No. 72
- Luna Sea (Atlantic, 1977) U.S. No. 11, AUS No. 73
- Élan (Atlantic, 1978) U.S. No. 11, AUS No. 31
- Undertow (Atlantic, 1980) U.S. No. 68, AUS No. 90
- Clouds Across the Sun (Atlantic, 1980)
- Break of Dawn (Atlantic, 1982)
- Mirror of the World (Atlantic, 1983)
- Messenger (Redstone, 1994)
- Colorado to Liverpool: A Tribute to the Beatles (Winged Horse, 2007)
- Comet (Sunset Blvd Records, 2020)
- Friends & Family (Sunset Blvd Records, 2023)
- Friends & Family 2 (Sunset Blvd Records, 2025)

=== Live albums ===
- Reunion Live (Winged Horse, 2009)

=== Singles ===
Year	Single	Chart Positions			
Year	Single	CB	US	US AC	AU
1976	"Livin' Ain't Livin'"	41	42	-	-
1976	"You Are the Woman"	8	9	6	-
1977	"Cinderella"	30	34	36	-
1977	"Just Remember I Love You"	9	11	1	-
1978	"So Long"	67	48	-	-
1978	"Strange Way"	11	11	24	45
1979	"Goodbye, I Love You"	40	43	10	-
1980	"Headed for a Fall"	36	35	-	-
1980	"Love That Got Away"	55	50	9	-
1980	"Only Time Will Tell"	-	-	46	-
1981	"Staying with It"	42	37	46	-
1983	"Always"	51	59	24	74
1983	"Runaway Love"	-	103	-	-
2008	"Walk More Softly"	-	-	-	-
2020	"Way Back When"	-	-	-	-
