= Boys Night Out (song) =

Single by Timothy B. Schmit

from the album Timothy B
- B-side: "Into the Night"
- Released: 1987
- Genre: Pop rock
- Length: 4:36
- Label: MCA
- Songwriters: Bruce Gaitsch; Will Jennings; Timothy B. Schmit
- Producers: Richard Rudolph; Bruce Gaitsch

Timothy B. Schmit singles chronology
"Playin' It Cool" (1984)	"Boys Night Out" (1987)	"Don't Give Up" (1988)

Music video
- "Boys Night Out" on YouTube

"Boys Night Out" is a song by American rock singer Timothy B. Schmit, released as the first single from his second solo studio album, Timothy B (1987). Schmit's best-selling single, it peaked at No. 25 on the U.S. Billboard Hot 100 chart and at No. 17 on the Billboard Album Rock Tracks chart.

== Charts ==
Chart	Peak position
Canada Top Singles (RPM)	69
US Billboard Hot 100	25
US Album Rock Tracks (Billboard)	17
