= Firefall (album) =

Studio album by Firefall
- Released: April 8, 1976
- Recorded: Criteria, Miami, Florida
- Genres: Soft rock; country rock
- Length: 39:49
- Label: Atlantic
- Producer: Jim Mason

Firefall chronology
| Firefall (1976) | Luna Sea (1977) |

Professional ratings
Review scores
| Source | Rating |
|---|---|
| AllMusic | 4.5/5 stars |

Firefall is the debut album by Firefall, released in April 1976.

It featured the major hit single "You Are the Woman" which reached No. 9 on the Billboard Hot 100. Two other tracks achieved minor success on the charts: "Livin' Ain't Livin'" at No. 42 and "Cinderella" at No. 34. This album became the fastest record to achieve gold status in Atlantic Records history.

== Track listing ==
1. "It Doesn't Matter" (Chris Hillman, Rick Roberts, Stephen Stills) – 3:31
2. "Love Isn't All" (Larry Burnett) – 4:13
3. "Livin' Ain't Livin'" (Rick Roberts) – 3:49
4. "No Way Out" (Larry Burnett) – 4:05
5. "Dolphin's Lullaby" – 4:34 (Rick Roberts)
6. "Cinderella" (Larry Burnett) – 3:53
7. "Sad Ol' Love Song" (Larry Burnett) – 4:42
8. "You Are the Woman" (Rick Roberts)– 2:45
9. "Mexico" (Rick Roberts)– 4:17
10. "Do What You Want" (Larry Burnett) – 4:00

== Charts ==
| Chart (1976) | Peak position |
|---|---|
| Australia (Kent Music Report) | 72 |
| Canada Top Albums/CDs (RPM) | 35 |
| US Billboard 200 | 28 |

== Certifications ==
| Country | Certifications |
|---|---|
| United States | Platinum |

== Personnel ==
Firefall

- Mark Andes - bass guitar
- Jock Bartley - lead electric & slide guitars; Bigsby Palm Pedal guitar on "Livin' Ain't Livin"
- Larry Burnett - electric and acoustic rhythm guitars, vocals
- Michael Clarke - drums
- Rick Roberts - acoustic guitars, vocals

with

- David Muse - piano, clavinet, synthesizer, flute, tenor saxophone & harmonica
- Joe Lala - congas, timbales, shakers, tambourine, finger cymbals, & sand blocks on "Love Isn't All"
- Peter Graves - trombone on "Do What You Want"
- Ken Faulk - trumpet on "Do What You Want" and "Mexico"
- Whit Sidener - baritone saxophone on "Do What You Want"

Production

- Produced by Jim Mason of FREEFLOW PRODUCTIONS
- Mastered by George Marino at Sterling Sound, NYC
- Engineered by Karl Richardson, assisted by Michael Laskow
- Front album cover art by Ralph Wernli
- Cover Concept by Jock Bartley
