= Expando =

Studio album by Timothy B. Schmit
- Released: October 20, 2009
- Recorded: 2007–2009
- Studio: Mooselodge (Calabasas, California)
- Genre: Country rock; country pop
- Length: 52:50
- Label: Lost Highway
- Producer: Timothy B. Schmit

Timothy B. Schmit chronology
| Feed the Fire (2001) | Expando (2009) |

Professional ratings
Review scores
| Source | Rating |
|---|---|
| AllMusic | 4.5/5 stars |
| BBC | (favourable) |
| Encyclopedia of Popular Music | 4/5 stars |

Expando is the fifth studio album by American musician Timothy B. Schmit, released on October 20, 2009, by Lost Highway Records. It is Schmit's first studio album since 2001's Feed the Fire.

Schmit wrote all the songs himself and recorded them in his home studio.

== Track listing ==
1. "One More Mile" – 4:18
  - featuring Keb' Mo'
2. "Parachute" – 6:18
  - featuring Graham Nash and Kenny Wayne Shepherd
3. "Friday Night" – 4:43
  - featuring Van Dyke Parks
4. "Ella Jean" – 4:05
5. "White Boy from Sacramento" – 4:55
6. "Compassion" – 4:40
7. "Downtime" – 6:33
  - featuring Dwight Yoakam, Kid Rock, and Gary Burton
8. "Melancholy" – 3:27
9. "I Don't Mind" – 4:13
  - featuring Van Dyke Parks
10. "Secular Praise" – 4:52
  - featuring The Blind Boys of Alabama
11. "A Good Day" – 4:47
  - featuring Greg Leisz

== Personnel ==
=== Musicians ===
- Timothy B. Schmit – vocals, bass, acoustic guitar (1–4, 6–11), ukulele (1, 9), percussion (1, 3, 4, 6, 9), tambourine (2, 5, 8), strumstick (2), backing vocals (2, 3, 11), tenor guitar (3, 11), mandolin (3), drums (3), dobro (4), harmonica (4, 11), electric rhythm guitar (5), slide dobro (5), baritone guitar (7), electric piano (8)
- Benmont Tench – organ (2, 10), electric piano (5)
- Van Dyke Parks – accordion (3, 7, 9, 10)
- Garth Hudson – organ (3)
- Keb' Mo' – slide dobro (1)
- Kenny Wayne Shepherd – lead guitar (2)
- Hank Linderman – baritone guitar (3), backing vocals (3, 11), finger snaps (7)
- Ben Schmit – lead guitar (5), drums (5)
- Greg Leisz – steel guitar (11)
- Jim Keltner – drums (2, 7, 8, 10, 11), percussion (7, 10)
- Gary Ponder – trash can (3)
- Gary Burton – vibraphone (7)
- David Ralicke – alto saxophone (9), tenor saxophone (9), trombone (9)
- Freebo – tuba (9)
- Graham Nash – backing vocals (2)
- Marlena Jeter – backing vocals (5)
- Mortonette Jenkins – backing vocals (5)
- Valerie Pinkston – backing vocals (5)
- Dwight Yoakam – backing vocals (7)
- Kid Rock – backing vocals (7)
- The Blind Boys of Alabama – backing vocals (10)
- Donna De Lory – backing vocals (11)

=== Production ===
- Timothy B. Schmit – producer, mixing, inside booklet photography
- Hank Linderman – production assistance, engineer, mixing, back cover artwork
- Joe Gastwirt – mastering at Joe Gastwirt Mastering (Los Angeles, California)
- Jean Schmit – front cover artwork, back cover artwork
- Gary Burden – art direction, design
- Jenice Heo – art direction, design
- Randee St. Nicholas – booklet back photography
- Paul Goldsmith – inside jacket photography

== Charts ==
Chart performance for Expando
| Chart (2009) | Peak position |
|---|---|
| US Billboard Top Heatseekers | 43 |
