= Don't Give Up (Timothy B. Schmit song) =

Single by Timothy B. Schmit

from the album Timothy B
- Released: 1988
- Genre: Pop rock
- Length: 3:57
- Label: MCA
- Songwriter: Timothy B. Schmit
- Producers: Richard Rudolph; Bruce Gaitsch

Timothy B. Schmit singles chronology
"Boys Night Out" (1987)	"Don't Give Up" (1988)	"Everybody Needs a Lover" (1988)

Music video
- "Don't Give Up" on YouTube

"Don't Give Up" is a song written and recorded by American rock singer Timothy B. Schmit, released as the second single from his second solo studio album, Timothy B (1987).

"Don't Give Up" peaked at No. 22 on the Canadian Adult Contemporary chart, and No. 30 on the U.S. Adult Contemporary chart, becoming his final charting single.

== Charts ==
Chart	Peak position
Canadian Adult Contemporary	22
U.S. Adult Contemporary	30
