= Feed the Fire (Timothy B. Schmit album) =

Studio album by Timothy B. Schmit
- Released: May 1, 2001
- Recorded: 2000–2001
- Studio: Mooselodge (Calabasas, California); Whatinthewhatthe? Studio (Los Angeles, California)
- Genre: Rock
- Length: 44:55
- Label: Lucan; Grapevine/Giant
- Producer: Timothy B. Schmit; Mark Hudson

Timothy B. Schmit chronology
Tell Me the Truth (1990)	Feed the Fire (2001)	Expando (2009)

Feed the Fire is the fourth studio album by Timothy B. Schmit, released in 2001.

== Production ==
The album was produced by Schmit and Mark Hudson; it was recorded at Schmit's home studio. It contains a cover of Bob Dylan's "To Make You Feel My Love". "You Are Everything" is a cover of the song made famous by the Stylistics. Joe Walsh guested on Feed the Fire.

== Critical reception ==
Professional ratings
Review scores
Source	Rating
AllMusic	3/5 stars
Los Angeles Times	2.5/4 stars

The Los Angeles Times wrote that "there's modest warmth rather than roaring fire from the Eagles' bassist, whose first solo album in 11 years is steeped in '70s R&B- tinged classic rock a' la you know who." The Birmingham Mail called the album "easy on the ear, country-flavoured soft-rock which sounds great on the open road with the top down and the wind in your hair." The Sacramento Bee deemed it "a solid showcase for Schmit's musical talents, from svelte vocal harmonies to polished songwriting."

== Track listing ==
1. "The Shadow" (Timothy B. Schmit) - 4:22
2. "Every Song Is You" (Steve Dudas, Dean Grakal, Mark Hudson) - 4:09
3. "Make You Feel My Love" (Bob Dylan) - 3:47
4. "I'll Always Let You In" (Timothy B. Schmit, Mark Hudson, Steve Dudas, Dean Grakal) - 4:01
5. "Running" (Mark Hudson, Sander Selover) - 4:41
6. "I'm Not Angry Anymore" (Timothy B. Schmit, Stan Lynch) - 4:15
7. "Give Me Back My Sight" (Timothy B. Schmit, Hank Linderman) - 4:30
8. "You Are Everything" (Thom Bell, Linda Creed) - 3:50
9. "Top Of The Stairs" (Timothy B. Schmit, Darrell Brown, Michael James Peterson) - 3:43
10. "Moment Of Truth" (Timothy B. Schmit, Dean Grakal, Steve Dudas, Mark Hudson) - 3:26
11. "Song For Owen" (Timothy B. Schmit, W.G. Snuffy Walden, Hank Linderman) - 4:11

== Personnel ==
- Timothy B. Schmit – all vocals (1, 3, 7–9), keyboards (1), guitars (1), bass, lead vocals (2, 4, 5, 10), backing vocals (2, 4, 5, 10), vocals (6, 11), acoustic guitars (6, 10, 11), tambourine (8), string arrangements (11)
- Hank Linderman – keyboards (3, 7, 8), acoustic guitars (3, 7), EBow (3), electric guitars (6, 7), guitars (8)
- Jim Cox – keyboards (4, 5, 10)
- Adam Benjamin – keyboards (11)
- Mark Hudson – acoustic guitar (2, 4, 5, 10), backing vocals (2, 4, 5, 10)
- Steve Dudas – electric guitar (2, 4, 5, 10), acoustic guitar (2, 4, 5, 10)
- Joe Walsh – electric lead guitar (4)
- Scott Crago – drums (1, 2, 4, 5, 10), percussion (1, 2, 4, 5, 10)
- Richard Feldman – loops (6, 7)
- East West – loops (8)
- Cameron Stone – cello (7)
- Stefanie Fife – cello (11)
- Novi Novog – viola (11), string arrangements (11)
- Robin Lorentz – violin (11)
- Cameo and Stan Lynch – "Who's Angry?" voices (6)

== Production ==
- Timothy B. Schmit – producer (1, 3, 6–9), engineer
- Mark Hudson – producer (2, 4, 5, 10), engineer
- Scott Gordon – engineer, mixing
- Eric Greedy – engineer
- Rob Jacobs – engineer
- Hank Linderman – engineer, mixing
- American Recording Co. (Calabasas, California) – mixing location
- Joe Gastwirt – mastering at Oceanview Digital Mastering (Los Angeles, California)
- Gary Burden – art direction, design
- Jenice Heo – art direction, design
- Henry Diltz – photography
