= Runaway Love (Firefall song) =

1983 single by Firefall

Single by Firefall

from the album Mirror of the World
- Released: 1983
- Genre: Rock, pop rock
- Length: 3:57
- Label: Atlantic
- Songwriter(s): Jock Bartley, John Sambataro and Paul Crosta

Firefall singles chronology
"Always" (1983)	"Runaway Love" (1983)

"Runaway Love" is a single by the American country rock band Firefall. Released in 1983, it was one of their final singles, along with "Always". It was the first song on their 1983 album, Mirror of the World.

The song was written by Jock Bartley, John Sambataro and Paul Crosta. It peaked at #103 on the Billboard Pop Chart.

It also appeared on their 1992 Greatest Hits album, as well as their 2004 Break of Dawn/Mirror of the World album.
