= Timothy B. Schmit =

American musician (b. 1947)

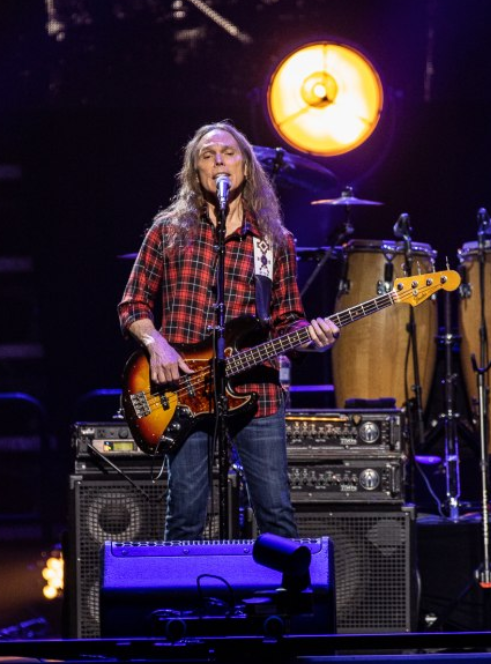
- Schmit performing with Eagles in 2019

Background information
- Born: Timothy Bruce Schmit; October 30, 1947 (age 79); Oakland, California, U.S.
- Genres: Rock; country rock; soft rock; hard rock
- Occupations: Musician; songwriter
- Instruments: Vocals; bass; guitar
- Years active: 1965–present
- Labels: Asylum; MCA; Lucan; Lost Highway; Benowen
- Member of: Eagles
- Formerly of: Poco; Coral Reefer Band; Ringo Starr & His All-Starr Band; Glad
- Website: timothybschmit.com

Timothy Bruce Schmit (born October 30, 1947) is an American musician, singer, and songwriter. He has performed as the bassist and vocalist for rock bands Poco and Eagles, having replaced Randy Meisner in both cases. Schmit has also worked for decades as a session musician and solo artist. In 1998, he was inducted into the Rock and Roll Hall of Fame as a member of Eagles.

== Early life ==
Timothy Bruce Schmit was born on October 30, 1947, in Oakland, California. He was raised in Sacramento and attended Encina High School.

== Career ==
=== 1965-1968: Early years ===
Schmit began playing in the folk music band Tim, Tom & Ron at the age of 15. That group evolved into a surf band called the Contenders, then changed its name to the New Breed (sometimes known simply as "the Breed"). As the New Breed, they had a major local hit in Sacramento: the Animals-inspired "Green Eye’d Woman," which was released in 1965 and hit No. 1 on local top-40 outlet KXOA. (The track also charted on isolated stations in Virginia and Indiana.) A few more local-only hits followed, before the group changed its name once again to Glad. The group recorded their sole studio album Feelin' Glad in 1968.

=== 1968-1977: Poco ===
Schmit playing with Poco at the Carolina Coliseum on August 15, 1975

In 1968, Schmit auditioned for Poco but was turned down in favor of founding member Randy Meisner. When Meisner quit the band in 1969, Schmit replaced him on bass guitar and backing vocals. He appeared on nine of Poco's studio albums and two live albums between 1969 and 1977, composing numerous songs. He wrote and was the lead vocalist on the song "Keep on Tryin'," Poco's biggest hit single to that point, peaking at No. 50 on the U.S. Billboard Hot 100 in 1975.

Apart from Poco, Schmit also contributed backing vocals to Firefall's 1977 hit, "Just Remember I Love You." Schmit sang backing vocals on the Steely Dan studio albums Pretzel Logic (1974), The Royal Scam (1976), and Aja (1977). Schmit also sang backing vocals on "Never Let Her Slip Away", a top 5 UK hit for Andrew Gold in 1978, along with Brock Walsh, JD Souther and an uncredited Freddie Mercury of Queen. In 1974, Schmit played bass guitar alongside guitarist Glenn Frey and drummer Don Henley on the song "You Can Close Your Eyes" featured on Linda Ronstadt's fifth solo studio album Heart Like a Wheel.

=== 1977-1980: Eagles ===
In 1977, Schmit joined Eagles after the tour in support of their fifth studio album Hotel California (1976), replacing Randy Meisner on bass guitar and backing vocals, as he had done in Poco, after Meisner quit. Although Eagles are thought of as a quintessential California band, Schmit is the only member of the group who is actually a native of California.

On their sixth studio album, The Long Run (1979), Schmit co-wrote and sang lead vocals on the song "I Can't Tell You Why", which peaked at No. 8 on the Billboard Hot 100. The band broke up in 1980.

=== 1980-1996: Session work and solo ventures ===
After the Eagles initially broke up in 1980, Schmit embarked on a solo career, singing backing vocals and playing bass guitar for hire during studio sessions. His voice can be heard on many hits, including Bob Seger's "Fire Lake" and Boz Scaggs' "Look What You've Done to Me" (each with Frey and Henley), Don Felder's "Heavy Metal (Takin' a Ride)" (with Henley), and Crosby, Stills and Nash's "Southern Cross" and "Wasted on the Way", where he sang harmony vocals. He was also a backing musician on two of Don Henley's hit songs, "Dirty Laundry" and "You Don't Know Me at All". Schmit also sang background vocals on Toto's 1982 single "Africa".

Schmit teamed with his predecessor in both Poco and the Eagles, Randy Meisner, along with their mutual Eagles bandmate Joe Walsh, to provide backing vocals to the Richard Marx 1987 hit "Don't Mean Nothing". Schmit also performed on the Toto hit single "I Won't Hold You Back", and the Jars of Clay song "Everything in Between". He also played on Glenn Shorrock's debut solo studio album, Villain of the Peace (1982). He sang harmony and backing vocals on Dan Fogelberg's eighth studio album Windows and Walls (1984). In 1988 he added backing vocals to Sheena Easton's ninth studio album The Lover in Me and in 1989 Schmit added backing vocals on the Stacey Q single, "Heartbeat", which was featured on her third studio album, Nights Like This. He also sang backing vocals on America's ninth studio album Alibi (1980).

Schmit toured with Toto in 1982 and with Jimmy Buffett in 1983, 1984, and 1985 as a member of the Coral Reefer Band and coined the term "Parrotheads" to describe Buffett's fans. He was a member of Ringo Starr & His All-Starr Band in 1992.

In September 1984, he released his debut solo studio album Playin' It Cool through Asylum Records. The album peaked at No. 160 on the Billboard 200, and features guest appearances from Don Henley, Joe Walsh, Steve Lukather, Carl Wilson, JD Souther and Rita Coolidge.

In September 1987, Schmit released his second solo studio album, Timothy B through MCA Records. The album peaked at No. 106 on the Billboard 200 chart, and the single, "Boys Night Out", hit No. 25 on the Billboard Hot 100 chart, becoming Schmit's best selling single. The album was mostly produced by Richard Rudolph with co-production by Bruce Gaitsch.

In July 1990, he released his third solo studio album Tell Me the Truth, which failed to chart, and would be his last studio album for eleven years until Feed the Fire (2001).

In 1993, he contributed backing vocals to several tracks on Clint Black's fourth studio album No Time to Kill, including the title track. In 1996, he sang on a cover version of the Beach Boys' song "Caroline, No" on their eighth studio album Stars and Stripes Vol. 1, with the Beach Boys themselves contributing harmonies. In 2000, he toured with Dan Fogelberg; recordings from that tour became a live album, Dan Fogelberg Live. Schmit sang harmony on the title track of Katy Rose's debut studio album, Because I Can, produced by fellow Poco alumnus and Katy's father, Kim Bullard.

=== 1994-2000: Eagles reunion and continued solo work ===
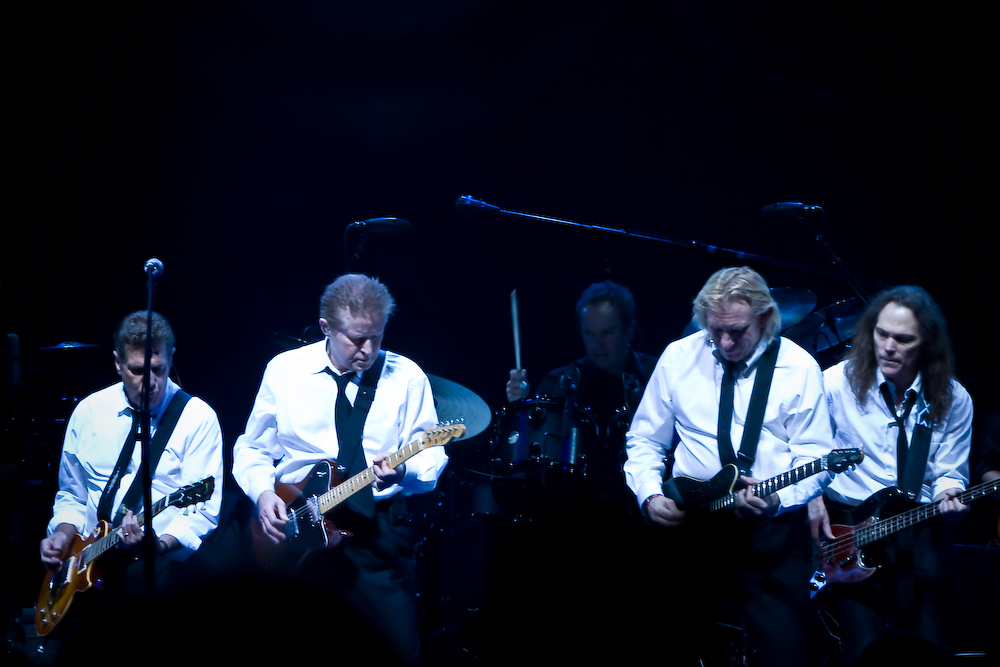
Schmit (far right) performing with Eagles, during their Long Road Out of Eden Tour, 2008

Fourteen years after their initial breakup, the Eagles reunited. Schmit sang the lead vocals on "Love Will Keep Us Alive" on their reunion live album Hell Freezes Over (1994).

In 2007, Eagles released their seventh studio album, Long Road Out of Eden. Schmit continued to be part of Eagles lineup along with Don Henley, Glenn Frey, and Joe Walsh until Frey's death in 2016. He is in the current Eagles touring lineup featuring Vince Gill, and Frey's son Deacon.

Schmit's fifth solo studio album, Expando, was released in October 2009. In May 2012, Schmit was awarded an Honorary Doctorate of Music from the Berklee College of Music. His sixth studio album Leap of Faith was released on September 23, 2016, the first release of an Eagles member since the death of bandmate Glenn Frey in January 2016. His seventh studio album Day by Day was released on May 6, 2022.

== Soundtracks ==
In 1982, Schmit sang a cover version of the Tymes' 1963 song "So Much in Love" on the soundtrack to the coming-of-age comedy film Fast Times at Ridgemont High, which was later included on his debut solo studio album Playin' It Cool (1984).

In 1991, Schmit covered the standard "I Only Have Eyes for You" for the soundtrack of the coming-of-age black comedy film Don't Tell Mom the Babysitter's Dead.

In 1995, Schmit sang the song "How Far I'll Fly" for the ending credits to the Australian family adventure film Napoleon.

== Personal life ==
Schmit has three children: a daughter by his first wife and a daughter and son by his present wife. He was successfully treated for throat and neck cancer in late 2012.

== Discography ==
=== Studio albums ===
Year	Album details	Peak positions	
Year	Album details	US	US Heat
1984	Playin' It Cool: First studio album; Release date: September 17, 1984; Label: Asylum Records	160	1
1987	Timothy B: Second studio album; Release date: September 7, 1987; Label: MCA Records	106	1
1990	Tell Me the Truth: Third studio album; Release date: July 24, 1990; Label: MCA Records	—	—
2001	Feed the Fire: Fourth studio album; Release date: May 1, 2001; Label: Lucan Records	—	—
2009	Expando: Fifth studio album; Release date: October 20, 2009; Label: Lost Highway Records	—	43
2016	Leap of Faith: Sixth studio album; Release date: September 23, 2016; Label: Benowen Records	—	—
2022	Day by Day: Seventh studio album; Release date: May 6, 2022	—	—
"—" denotes releases that did not chart

=== Singles ===
Year	Single	Peak positions					Album
Year	Single	US	US Main	US AC	CAN	CAN AC	Album
1982	"So Much in Love"	59	—	27	—	—	Playin' It Cool
1984	"Playin' It Cool"	101	48	—	—	—	Playin' It Cool
1987	"Boys Night Out"	25	17	—	69	—	Timothy B
1988	"Don't Give Up"	—	—	30	—	22	Timothy B
2016	"Red Dirt Road"	—	—	—	—	—	Leap of Faith
2019	"The Good Fight" (featuring Sheryl Crow)	—	—	—	—	—	Non-album singles
2020	"Cross That Line"	—	—	—	—	—	Non-album singles
2022	"Simple Man"	—	—	—	—	—	Day by Day
2022	"Heartbeat"	—	—	—	—	—	Day by Day
"—" denotes releases that did not chart
