= Élan (Firefall album) =

Studio album by Firefall
- Released: 1978
- Genre: Soft rock
- Length: 37:16
- Label: Atlantic
- Producers: Tom Dowd, Ron Albert, Howard Albert

Firefall chronology
Luna Sea (1977)	Élan (1978)	Undertow (1980)

Professional ratings
Review scores
Source	Rating
AllMusic	4/5 stars
Christgau's Record Guide	B−

Élan is the third album by the American band Firefall, released in 1978. It featured the single "Strange Way" which reached No. 11 on the Billboard Hot 100 and No. 24 on the Adult Contemporary chart.

== Track listing ==
1. "Strange Way" – 4:41 (Rick Roberts)
2. "Sweet and Sour" – 3:29 (Jock Bartley, Roberts)
3. "Wrong Side of Town" – 2:43 (Larry Burnett)
4. "Count Your Blessings" – 3:29 (Roberts)
5. "Get You Back" – 4:10 (Burnett)
6. "Anymore" – 3:56 (Mark Andes, Burnett)
7. "Baby" – 3:45 (Burnett)
8. "Goodbye, I Love You" – 4:19 (Roberts)
9. "Sweet Ann" – 3:20 (Roberts)
10. "Winds of Change" – 3:24 (Roberts)

== Charts ==
Chart (1978–79)	Peak position
Australia (Kent Music Report)	31
Canada Top Albums/CDs (RPM)	40
US Billboard 200	27

== Personnel ==
- Rick Roberts – lead vocals, rhythm acoustic guitar
- Larry Burnett – lead vocals, rhythm electric and acoustic guitars
- Jock Bartley – lead electric and acoustic guitars, backing vocals, electric slide guitar,
- David Muse – keyboards, organ, Moog synthesizer, tenor saxophone, flute, harmonica
- Mark Andes – bass, backing vocals
- Michael Clarke – drums
