= Luna Sea (Firefall album) =

Studio album by Firefall
- Released: July 15, 1977
- Recorded: Criteria, Miami, Florida
- Genre: Country rock
- Length: 40:57
- Label: Atlantic
- Producer: Jim Mason

Firefall chronology
Firefall (1976)	Luna Sea (1977)	Élan (1978)

Professional ratings
Review scores
Source	Rating
AllMusic	4/5 stars
Christgau's Record Guide	C

Luna Sea is the second studio album by the American band Firefall, released in 1977. It featured the single "Just Remember I Love You" which reached No. 11 on the Billboard Hot 100 and No. 1 on the Adult Contemporary chart. The title is a pun on "lunacy".

== Track listing ==
1. "So Long" – 5:20 (Rick Roberts)
2. "Just Remember I Love You" – 3:16 (Rick Roberts)
3. "Sold on You" – 3:30 (Larry Burnett)
4. "Someday Soon" – 4:03 (Rick Roberts)
5. "Just Think" – 4:10 (Firefall)
6. "Getaway" – 3:44 (Larry Burnett)
7. "Only a Fool" – 4:23 (Rick Roberts)
8. "Head on Home" – 4:02 (Larry Burnett)
9. "Piece of Paper" – 4:05 (Larry Burnett)
10. "Even Steven" – 4:18 (Larry Burnett, Rick Roberts)

=== 1995 CD reissue bonus tracks ===
1. "Tropical Night"
2. "Rainforest"
3. "Ya Never Know"
4. "Over You"

== Charts ==
Chart (1977)	Peak position
Australia (Kent Music Report)	73
Canada Top Albums/CDs (RPM)	34
US Billboard 200	27

== Personnel ==
- Rick Roberts – lead vocals, rhythm acoustic guitar
- Larry Burnett – lead vocals, rhythm electric and acoustic guitars
- Jock Bartley – lead electric and acoustic guitars, backing vocals, electric slide guitar
- David Muse – keyboards, organ, Moog synthesizer, tenor saxophone, flute, harmonica
- Mark Andes – bass, backing vocals
- Michael Clarke – drums
