= Boulder Theater =

Music theater in Boulder, Colorado

Coordinates: 40°01′09″N 105°16′38″W

Boulder Theater is a music theater in Boulder, Colorado.

== History ==
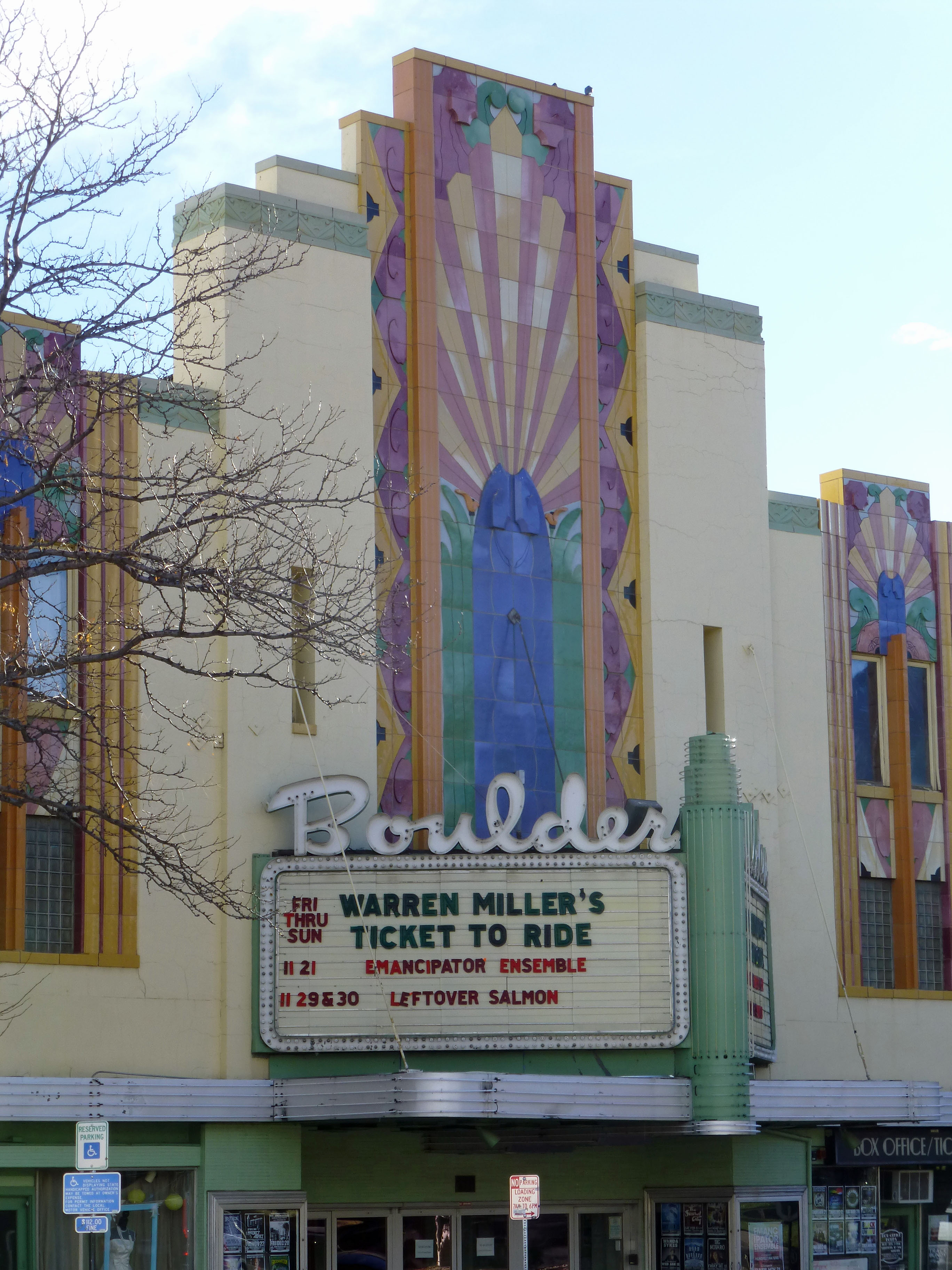
Boulder Theater, with its characteristic art-deco design

Boulder Theater opened in 1906 as the Curran Opera House. The opening night was October 2, 1906, presenting William Collier Sr.'s On the Quiet. Initially, James A. Curran served as the president of the opera house, with R. P. Penney as Vice President and Manager.

Later, the theater presented ballet, church festivals, orchestral concerts and early silent films. There also were children's shows.

On October 7, 1920, vice-presidential candidate Franklin Delano Roosevelt spoke at Curran Theater. In 1929, the theater showed its first talkie Mother Knows Best.

In 1936, the Curran became a movie theater, renamed the Boulder Theater. The architecture was art-deco, and was inspired by the Boulder courthouse quite near.

In 1978, the theater's owner, Mann Theatres, sold the building and relocated their movie theater to the Arapahoe Village Shopping Center.

In 1979, the theater's facade and marquee became subject to a historic easement held by Historic Boulder, aimed to preserve the artwork and design.

After a period of hosting concerts and other events, the theater was closed in February of 1983.

In 1987, the Boulder City Council approved an ordinance to provide an admissions tax rebate for a three-year period once the theater reopened, in a bid to encourage the reopening of the structure. It was eventually purchased by Dave Edwards and Ray Livingstone.

On November 15, 1988, the theater reopened after an extensive renovation, having been closed for five years. The renovation cost roughly $200,000 and involved removing old theater seats from the floor, installing platforms leading to the stage, and installing a bar.

In 1992, Richard MacLeod purchased the theater from Dave Edwards and Livingstone Holding Corp. In July 1993, the city of Boulder seized the Boulder Theater for non-payment of roughly $4,300 in city sales taxes. The owner was given until July 15 to settle the situation with the city before they would move to auction the Theater and assets to cover the debt. The owner foreclosed after several payments were missed and ownership reverted to Dave Edwards and Livingstone Holding Corp., which covered the $21,000 in taxes that were due to the city, county and state, before putting the property up for sale again.

Boulder Theater survived the COVID-19 shutdown, and still hosts acts.

== Notable acts who have played there ==
- Arlo Guthrie
- BB King
- Blues Traveler
- Buddy Guy
- Johnny Cash
- Bonnie Raitt
- Branford Marsalis
- Chick Corea
- David Bromberg
- Esperanza Spalding
- Gregg Allman
- Hot Rize
- KT Tunstall
- Lindsey Buckingham
- Pat Metheny
- Pixies
- Ralph Stanley
- Richard Thompson
- Stephen Stills
- Tori Amos

== External links and references ==
- Official Website
- Visit Boulder
- Historic Boulder
