= Rick Roberts (musician) =

American musician (born 1949)

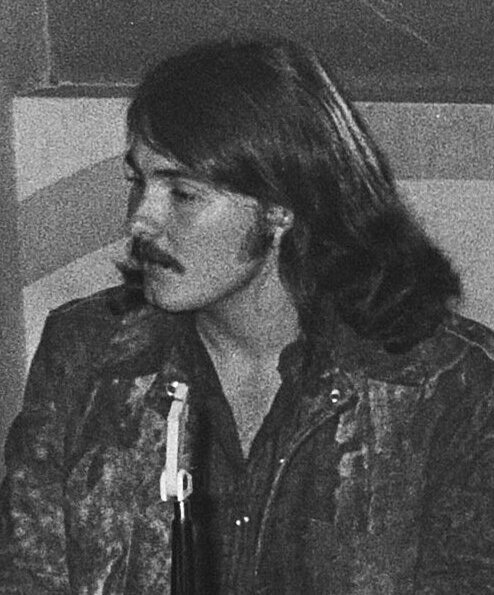
- Roberts in 1970

Background information
- Birth name: Richard James Roberts
- Born: August 31, 1949 (age 75); Clearwater, Florida, U.S.
- Genres: Country rock
- Occupation(s): Musician, songwriter
- Instrument(s): Vocals, guitar
- Years active: 1969–1992, 2010–present
- Formerly of: The Flying Burrito Brothers; Firefall
- Website: rickrobertsmusic.com

Richard James Roberts (born August 31, 1949) is an American country rock and soft rock singer-songwriter who recorded with many influential artists over several genres. He is best known as a founding member and lead singer of Firefall from 1974 to 1981, as well as for his work with the Flying Burrito Brothers on their 1971 self-titled album. He also recorded two solo albums, Windmills in 1972 and She Is a Song in 1973.

== Career ==
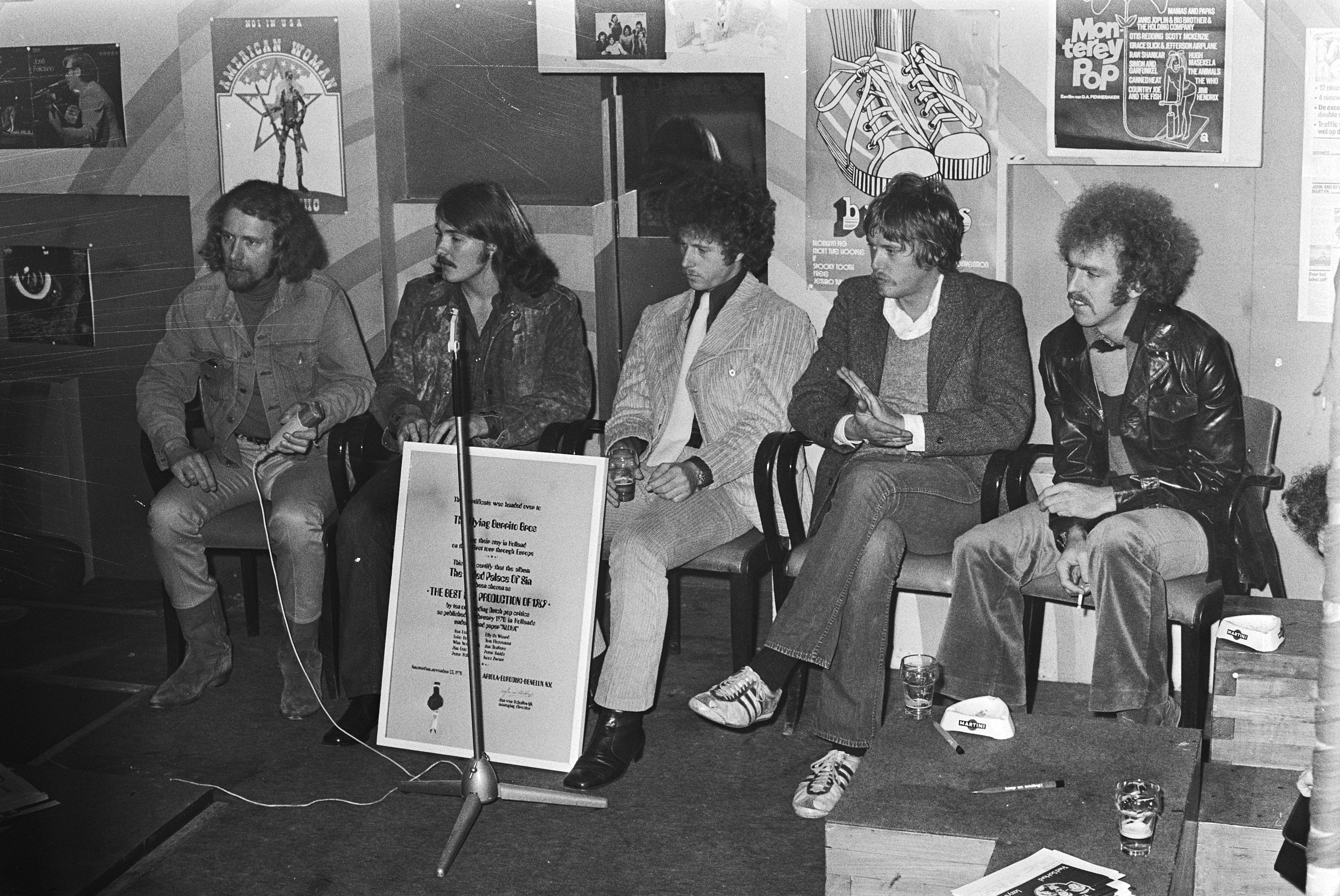
Flying Burrito Brothers (Amsterdam, 1970). From left to right: Sneaky Pete Kleinow, Rick Roberts, Chris Hillman, Michael Clarke, Bernie Leadon

In the fall of 1981, Roberts played dates in tandem with fellow former Burrito Brother Chris Hillman.

In 1985, he was a member of "A 20th Anniversary Tribute to The Byrds", a band co-founded by ex-Byrds Gene Clark and Michael Clarke. The group also originally included former members of the Band, Richard Manuel and Rick Danko, as well as Blondie Chaplin and John York (who was Chris Hillman's replacement in the Byrds in 1968). The band generated controversy through public confusion in relation to the original Byrds, at times being billed at some venues as "The Byrds".

In 1987, he teamed up with ex-Eagle Randy Meisner in the short lived Roberts-Meisner Band and then rejoined his bandmates in Firefall from 1989 to 1992. But he was sidelined due to health issues for a number of years before eventually returning to the road as a solo act. In 2010 he returned to music and released three 4-song-EPs on iTunes - Phases; Same Mirror, Different Reflections, and Full Bloom (the latter having two different track listings) - and launched his website and in the summer and fall of 2019, he toured together with fellow Firefaller Larry Burnett.

== Discography ==
=== Solo albums ===
- 1972: Windmills (A&M)
- 1973: She Is a Song (A&M)

=== Singles ===
- 1972: "Deliver Me (Mono)" / "Deliver Me (Stereo)" (A&M)

=== Digital EPs ===
- 2010: Phases
- 2011: Same Mirror, Different Reflections
- 2011: Full Bloom

=== Compilations ===
- 1979: The Best of Rick Roberts (A&M)
- 2009: Windmills / She Is a Song (BGO) – UK release

=== As a member of The Flying Burrito Brothers ===
- 1971: The Flying Burrito Bros (A&M)
- 1971: Devils in Disguise: 1971 Live Radio Broadcast (Smokin' / Let Them Eat Vinyl) – released in 2012
- 1972: Last of the Red Hot Burritos (A&M)
- 1973: Live in Amsterdam (Ariola)

=== As a member of Firefall ===
- 1976: Firefall (Atlantic)
- 1977: Luna Sea (Atlantic)
- 1978: Élan (Atlantic)
- 1978: Undertow (Atlantic)
- 1980: Clouds Across the Sun (Atlantic)

=== As composer ===
1971: Stephen Stills, Chris Hillman, It Doesn't Matter, Manassas, Track 12

- 1973: Linda Ronstadt – Don't Cry Now (Asylum) – track 7, "Colorado"
- 1977, Chris Hillman – Clear Sailin' (Asylum) – track 10, "Clear Sailin'" (co-written with Chris Hillman and Richard Marx)
- 1977: New Grass Revival – When the Storm Is Over (Flying Fish) – track 1, "Four Days Of Rain"
- 1978: The Dirt Band – The Dirt Band (United Artists) – track 4, "Lights"
- 1979: The Dirt Band – An American Dream (United Artists) – track 2, "In Her Eyes"
- 1979: McGuinn, Clark & Hillman – McGuinn, Clark & Hillman (Capitol) – track 1, "Long Long Time" (co-written with Chris Hillman)
- 1996: Barry Manilow – Summer of '78 (Arista) – track 12, "Just Remember I Love You"
- 2000: Jill Jack – Watch Over Me (Drum Dancer)- track 10, "Colorado"
- 2002: Beki Hemingway – Words for Loss for Words (Salt Lady) – track 8, "Just Remember I Love You"
- 2004: Curtis Burch – Burchland (Bowling Green Chamber) – track 5, "Four Days of Rain"
- 2008: Shawna Russell – Goddess (Way Out West) – track 5, "Strange Way"
- 2009: John Cowan – Telluride Live (Entertainment One) – track 6, "Four Days of Rain"
- 2014: John Cowan – Sixty (Compass) – track 2, "Why Are You Crying"

=== Also appears on ===
- 1970: Bob Gibson – Bob Gibson (Capitol) – vocals
- 1975: Stephen Stills – Stills (Columbia) – vocals
- 1976: Robbin Thompson – Robbin Thompson (Nemperor) – backing vocals
- 1976: Chris Hillman – Slippin' Away (Asylum) – vocals
- 1977: Wild Oats – Wild Oats (Clouds) – vocals
- 1980: Robbin Thompson – (Two "b's" Please) (Ovation) – backing vocals

== Bibliography ==
- Roberts, Rick (2014). Song Stories and Other Left-Handed Recollections. CreateSpace Independent Publishing Platform. ISBN 978-1500622046.
- Roberts, Rick (2015). Lame Brain: My Journey Back to Real Life. Mount James Publishing. ISBN 978-0996414425.
